= List of awards and nominations received by Pasek and Paul =

List of awards received by composers Pasek and Paul

Benj Pasek and Justin Paul awards and nominations
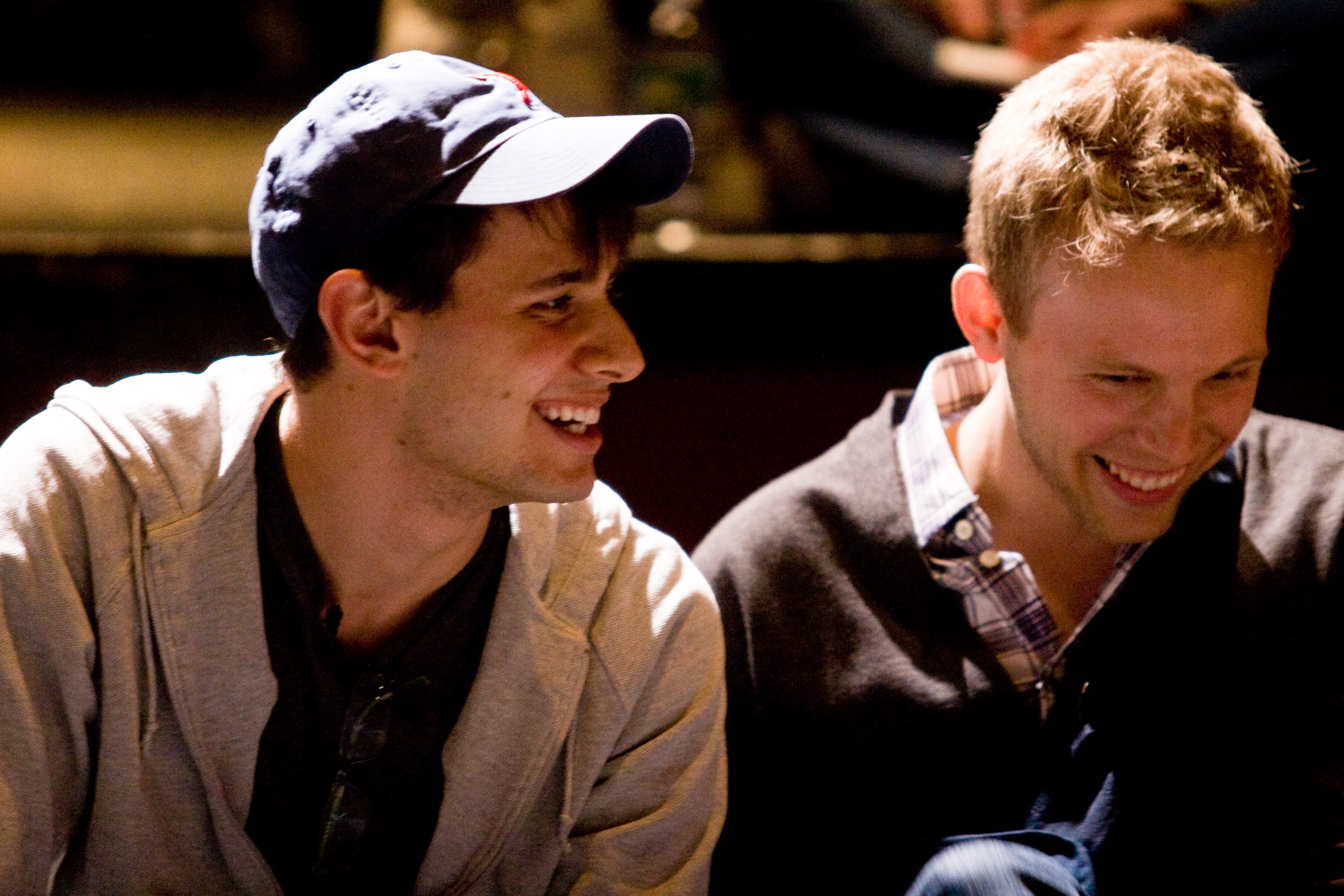
- Pasek (left) and Paul (right) in 2009
Awards and nominations
Award	Wins	Nominations
Academy Awards	1	3
Critics' Choice Awards	1	4
Emmy Awards	2	3
Golden Globe Awards	2	2
Grammy Awards	2	6
Tony Awards	2	3

Totals (Note: Certain award groups do not simply award one winner. They acknowledge several different recipients, have runners-up, and have third place. Since this is a specific recognition and is different from losing an award, runner-up mentions are considered wins in this award tally. For simplification and to avoid errors, each award in this list has been presumed to have had a prior nomination.)
- Wins: 22
- Nominations: 49

Pasek and Paul are an American songwriting duo and composing team consisting of Benj Pasek and Justin Paul. They have composed songs and music for musical theater, films and television series.

After graduating from the University of Michigan, and receiving an award from the Jonathan Larson Performing Arts Foundation, they began composing music for stage musicals such as Edges (2005) James and the Giant Peach (2010), and A Christmas Story: The Musical (2012). For the latter, they received their first Tony Award nomination for Best Original Score.

In 2016, they composed songs for Damien Chazelle's 2016 romantic musical film La La Land alongside Justin Hurwitz. The songs "City of Stars" and "Audition (The Fools Who Dream)" were nominated for Best Original Song at the 89th Academy Awards, with the former later winning the award. Also in 2016, their work on the musical Dear Evan Hansen earned them the Tony Award for Best Original Score. Two years later, the soundtrack album for the musical won the Grammy Award for Best Musical Theater Album.

In 2017, they were nominated again for the Academy Award for Best Original Song for "This Is Me" from the film The Greatest Showman. In 2024, they won the Primetime Emmy Award for Outstanding Original Music and Lyrics for the song "Which of the Pickwick Triplets Did It?", featured in the episode "Sitzprobe" from the comedy series Only Murders in the Building. With their Emmy win in September 2024, they became the 20th and 21st EGOT winners.

== Major associations ==
=== Academy Awards ===
The Academy Awards are a set of awards given by the Academy of Motion Picture Arts and Sciences annually for excellence of cinematic achievements.

Year	Category	Nominated work	Result	Ref.
2016	Best Original Song	"City of Stars" from La La Land	Won	
2016	Best Original Song	"Audition" from La La Land	Nominated	
2017	Best Original Song	"This Is Me" from The Greatest Showman	Nominated	

=== Critics' Choice Movie Awards ===
The Critics' Choice Movie Awards are presented annually since 1995 by the Broadcast Film Critics Association for outstanding achievements in the cinema industry.

Year	Category	Nominated work	Result	Ref.
2016	Best Song	"City of Stars" from La La Land	Won	
2016	Best Song	"Audition" from La La Land	Nominated	
2017	Best Song	"This Is Me" from The Greatest Showman	Nominated	
2019	Best Song	"Speechless" from Aladdin	Nominated	

=== Emmy Awards ===
The Primetime Emmy Awards are presented annually by the Academy of Television Arts & Sciences, also known as the Television Academy, to recognize and honor achievements in the television industry.

Year	Category	Nominated work	Result	Ref.
Children's and Family Emmy Awards
2025	Outstanding Original Song for a Preschool Program	"That's Why We Love Nature" from Sesame Street: Tamir's Water Works	Won	
Primetime Emmy Awards
2018	Outstanding Original Music and Lyrics	"In the Market for a Miracle" from A Christmas Story Live!	Nominated	
2024	Outstanding Original Music and Lyrics	"Which of the Pickwick Triplets Did It?" from Only Murders in the Building: Sitzprobe	Won	

=== Golden Globe Awards ===
The Golden Globe Award is an accolade bestowed by the 93 members of the Hollywood Foreign Press Association (HFPA) recognizing excellence in film and television, both domestic and foreign.

Year	Category	Nominated work	Result	Ref.
2016	Best Original Song	"City of Stars" from La La Land	Won	
2017	Best Original Song	"This Is Me" from The Greatest Showman	Won	

=== Grammy Awards ===
The Grammy Award is an annual award show presented by The Recording Academy.

Year	Category	Nominated work	Result	Ref.
2018	Best Musical Theater Album	Dear Evan Hansen (Original Broadway Cast)	Won	
2018	Best Song Written for Visual Media	"City of Stars" from La La Land	Nominated	
2019	Best Song Written for Visual Media	"This Is Me" from The Greatest Showman	Nominated	
2019	Best Compilation Soundtrack for Visual Media	The Greatest Showman	Won	
2022	Best Compilation Soundtrack for Visual Media	Dear Evan Hansen	Nominated	
2022	Best Song Written for Visual Media	"All I Know So Far" from Pink: All I Know So Far	Nominated	

=== Tony Awards ===
The Tony Award is an annual award show presented by American Theatre Wing and The Broadway League to recognize the best in theater productions.

Year	Category	Nominated work	Result	Ref.
2013	Best Original Score	A Christmas Story: The Musical	Nominated	
2017	Best Original Score	Dear Evan Hansen	Won	
2022	Best Musical	A Strange Loop (as producers)	Won	

== Miscellaneous awards ==
=== Drama Desk Awards ===
The Drama Desk Award is an annual prize recognizing excellence in New York theatre.

Year	Category	Nominated work	Result	Ref.
2013	Outstanding Music	A Christmas Story: The Musical	Nominated	
2016	Outstanding Lyrics	Dear Evan Hansen	Won	

=== Hollywood Music in Media Awards ===
The Hollywood Music in Media Awards (HMMA) in an organization that honours the best in original music for media.

Year	Category	Nominated work	Result	Ref.
2016	Best Original Song in a Feature Film	"City of Stars" from La La Land	Won	
2016	Best Original Song in a Feature Film	"Audition" from La La Land	Nominated	
2019	Best Original Song in a Feature Film	"Speechless" from Aladdin	Nominated	
2022	Best Original Song in a Feature Film	"Do a Little Good" from Spirited	Nominated	
2023	Best Original Song in a TV Show/Limited Series	"Which of the Pickwick Triplets Did It?" from Only Murders in the Building	Nominated	
2023	Best Main Title Theme – TV Show/Limited Series	Dear Edward	Nominated	

=== Satellite Awards ===
The Satellite Awards are a set of annual awards given by the International Press Academy.

Year	Category	Nominated work	Result	Ref.
2016	Best Original Song	"City of Stars" from La La Land	Won	
2016	Best Original Song	"Audition" from La La Land	Nominated	

=== Society of Composers & Lyricists ===
The Society of Composers & Lyricists are an organization founded in 1983 to represent composers and lyricists working in visual media, which presents an annual awards ceremony to recognize the best in music for films, television, and other media.

Year	Category	Nominated work	Result	Ref.
2020	Outstanding Original Song for Visual Media	"Speechless" from Aladdin	Nominated	
2023	Outstanding Original Song for a Comedy or Musical Visual Media Production	"Good Afternoon" from Spirited	Nominated	

== Critics associations and other award bodies ==
Year	Association	Category	Nominated work	Result	Ref.
2013	Outer Critics Circle Awards	Outstanding New Score (Broadway or Off-Broadway)	Dogfight	Nominated	
2016	Los Angeles Film Critics Association	Best Music (shared with Justin Hurwitz)	La La Land	Won	
2016	Capri Hollywood International Film Festival	Best Original Song	"City of Stars" from La La Land	Won	
2016	Houston Film Critics Society	Best Original Song	"City of Stars" from La La Land	Won	
2016	Georgia Film Critics Association	Best Original Song	"City of Stars" from La La Land	Won	
2016	Santa Barbara International Film Festival	Original Song	"City of Stars" from La La Land	Won	
2016	St. Louis Film Critics Association	Best Song	"City of Stars" from La La Land	Nominated	
2016	Houston Film Critics Society	Best Original Song	"Audition" from La La Land	Nominated	
2016	Georgia Film Critics Association	Best Original Song	"Audition" from La La Land	Won	
2016	St. Louis Film Critics Association	Best Song	"Audition" from La La Land	Won	
2016	Outer Critics Circle Awards	Outstanding New Score (Broadway or Off-Broadway)	Dear Evan Hansen	Nominated	
2016	Obie Awards	Obie Award for Musical Theatre	Dear Evan Hansen	Won	
2017	Georgia Film Critics Association	Best Original Song	"This Is Me" from The Greatest Showman	Nominated	
2017	Guild of Music Supervisors Awards	Best Song/Recording Created for a Film	"This Is Me" from The Greatest Showman	Nominated	
2017	Guild of Music Supervisors Awards	Best Music Supervision for Film: Budgeted Over 25 Million Dollars	The Greatest Showman	Nominated	
2020	Laurence Olivier Award	Best Original Score or New Orchestrations	Dear Evan Hansen	Won	

== Received by Paul ==
Year	Award	Category	Work	Result
2011	American Academy of Arts and Letters, Richard Rodgers Awards for Musical Theater		—N/a	Honorees
2011	ASCAP Foundation Award	Richard Rodgers New Horizons Award	—N/a	Honorees
2011	ASCAP Foundation Award	Songwriter's Fellowship Award	—N/a	Honorees
2013	Tony Award	Best Original Score	A Christmas Story: The Musical	Nominated
2013	Drama Desk Award	Outstanding Music	A Christmas Story: The Musical	Nominated
2013	Lucille Lortel Award	Outstanding Musical	Dogfight	Won
2013	Outer Critics Circle Award	Outstanding New Score	Dogfight	Nominated
2016	The Charles MacArthur Award for Outstanding Original New Play or Musical		Dear Evan Hansen	Nominated
2016	Drama Desk Award	Outstanding Lyrics	Dear Evan Hansen	Won
2016	Outer Critics Circle Award	Outstanding New Score	Dear Evan Hansen	Nominated
2016	Obie Award	Musical Theater, Music and Lyrics	Dear Evan Hansen	Won
2016	Hollywood Music in Media Award	Best Song in a Feature Film ("City of Stars")	La La Land	Won
2016	Los Angeles Film Critics Association Award	Best Music	La La Land	Won
2016	Critics' Choice Movie Award	Best Song ("City of Stars")	La La Land	Won
2016	Critics' Choice Movie Award	Best Song ("Audition (The Fools Who Dream)")	La La Land	Nominated
2016	Phoenix Film Critics Society Award	Best Song ("City of Stars")	La La Land	Won
2016	Phoenix Film Critics Society Award	Best Song ("Audition (The Fools Who Dream)")	La La Land	Nominated
2016	Satellite Award	Best Original Song ("City of Stars")	La La Land	Won
2016	Satellite Award	Best Original Song ("Audition (The Fools Who Dream)")	La La Land	Nominated
2016	Houston Film Critics Society Award	Best Original Song ("City of Stars")	La La Land	Won
2016	Houston Film Critics Society Award	Best Original Song ("Audition (The Fools Who Dream)")	La La Land	Nominated
2016	Golden Globe Award	Best Original Song ("City of Stars")	La La Land	Won
2017	Academy Award	Best Original Song ("City of Stars")	La La Land	Won
2017	Academy Award	Best Original Song ("Audition (The Fools Who Dream)")	La La Land	Nominated
2017	Tony Award	Best Original Score	Dear Evan Hansen	Won
2018	Grammy Award	Best Musical Theater Album	Dear Evan Hansen	Won
2018	Grammy Award	Best Song Written for Visual Media ("City of Stars")	La La Land	Nominated
2018	Hollywood Music in Media Award	Best Song in a Feature Film ("This Is Me")	The Greatest Showman	Nominated
2018	Critics' Choice Movie Award	Best Song ("This Is Me")	The Greatest Showman	Nominated
2018	Golden Globe Award	Best Original Song ("This Is Me")	The Greatest Showman	Won
2018	Academy Awards	Best Original Song ("This Is Me")	The Greatest Showman	Nominated
2018	Primetime Emmy Award	Outstanding Original Music and Lyrics ("In The Market For A Miracle")	A Christmas Story Live!	Nominated
2020	Laurence Olivier Award	Best Original Score or New Orchestrations	Dear Evan Hansen	Won
2022	Tony Award	Best Musical	A Strange Loop	Won
2024	Primetime Emmy Award	Outstanding Original Music and Lyrics	"Which of the Pickwick Triplets Did It?" (from Only Murders in the Building: Sitzprobe)	Won
2025	Children's and Family Emmy Awards	Outstanding Original Song for a Preschool Program	"That's Why We Love Nature" (from Sesame Street: Tamir's Water Works)	Won
