= List of awards and nominations received by Justin Hurwitz =

Justin Hurwitz awards and nominations
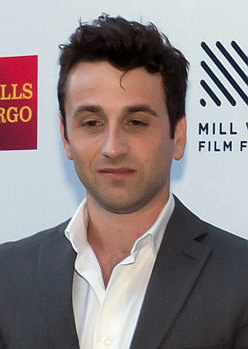
- Hurwitz in 2016
Awards and nominations
Award	Wins	Nominations
Golden Globe	4	4
Grammy	2	5
Academy Awards	2	4
BAFTA Awards	1	2

This is a list of awards and nominations received by American composer and screenwriter Justin Hurwitz. He is best known for scoring the 2016 film La La Land. He also scored Damien Chazelle's four other features, Babylon, First Man, Whiplash, and Guy and Madeline on a Park Bench. He's won four Golden Globe Awards, two Academy Awards, and a BAFTA Award for his work on La La Land, First Man, and Babylon.

== Major associations ==
=== Academy Awards ===
Year	Category	Nominated work	Result	Ref.
2017	Best Original Score	La La Land	Won	
2017	Best Original Song	"City of Stars" from La La Land	Won	
2017	Best Original Song	"Audition (The Fools Who Dream)" from La La Land	Nominated	
2023	Best Original Score	Babylon	Nominated	

=== BAFTA Awards ===
Year	Category	Nominated work	Result	Ref.
2017	Best Film Music	La La Land	Won	
2023	Best Film Music	Babylon	Nominated	

=== Golden Globe Awards ===
Year	Category	Nominated work	Result	Ref.
2017	Best Original Score	La La Land	Won	
2017	Best Original Song ("City of Stars")	La La Land	Won	
2019	Best Original Score	First Man	Won	
2023	Best Original Score	Babylon	Won	

=== Grammy Awards ===
Year	Category	Nominated work	Result	Ref.
2016	Best Score Soundtrack for Visual Media	Whiplash	Nominated	
2018	Best Score Soundtrack for Visual Media	La La Land	Won	
2018	Best Compilation Soundtrack for Visual Media	La La Land	Won	
2018	Best Song Written for Visual Media	"City of Stars"	Nominated	
2018	Best Arrangement, Instrumental and Vocals	"Another Day of Sun"	Nominated	

=== Primetime Emmy Awards ===
Year	Category	Nominated work	Result	Ref.
2018	Outstanding Comedy Series	Curb Your Enthusiasm	Nominated	

== Other awards and nominations ==
=== Atlanta Film Critics Circle ===
Year	Category	Nominated work	Result	Ref.
2018	Best Original Score	First Man	Won	

=== Austin Film Critics Association ===
Year	Category	Nominated work	Result	Ref.
2016	Best Score	La La Land	Won	
2018	Best Score	First Man	Nominated	

=== Boston Society of Film Critics ===
Year	Category	Nominated work	Result	Ref.
2018	Best Original Score	First Man	Runner-up	

=== Capri Hollywood International Film Festival ===
Year	Category	Nominated work	Result	Ref.
2018	Best Original Score	First Man	Won	

=== Chicago Film Critics Association ===
Year	Category	Nominated work	Result	Ref.
2016	Best Original Score	La La Land	Nominated	
2018	Best Original Score	First Man	Nominated	

=== Columbus Film Critics Association ===
Year	Category	Nominated work	Result	Ref.
2018	Best Score	First Man	Nominated	

=== Critics' Choice Movie Awards ===
Year	Category	Nominated work	Result	Ref.
2016	Best Song ("Audition (The Fools Who Dream)")	La La Land	Nominated	
2016	Best Song ("City of Stars")	La La Land	Won	
2016	Best Score	La La Land	Won	
2019	Best Score	First Man	Won	
2023	Best Score	Babylon	Nominated	

=== Dallas–Fort Worth Film Critics Association ===
Year	Category	Nominated work	Result	Ref.
2016	Best Musical Score	La La Land	Won	
2018	Best Musical Score	First Man	Runner-up	

=== Denver Film Critics Society ===
Year	Category	Nominated work	Result	Ref.
2018	Best Score	First Man	Nominated	

=== Florida Film Critics Circle ===
Year	Category	Nominated work	Result	Ref.
2016	Best Score	La La Land	Won	

=== Georgia Film Critics Association ===
Year	Category	Nominated work	Result	Ref.
2018	Best Original Score	First Man	Won	

=== Hawaii Film Critics Society ===
Year	Category	Nominated work	Result	Ref.
2018	Best Original Score	First Man	Won	

=== Hollywood Film Awards ===
Year	Category	Nominated work	Result	Ref.
2018	Hollywood Composer Award	First Man	Won	

=== Houston Film Critics Society ===
Year	Category	Nominated work	Result	Ref.
2018	Best Original Score	First Man	Nominated	

=== Las Vegas Film Critics Society ===
Year	Category	Nominated work	Result	Ref.
2016	Best Score	La La Land	Won	
2016	Best Song ("City of Stars")	La La Land	Won	

=== Los Angeles Film Critics Association ===
Year	Category	Nominated work	Result	Ref.
2016	Best Music	La La Land	Won	
2018	Best Music	First Man	Runner-up	

=== Los Angeles Online Film Critics Society ===
Year	Category	Nominated work	Result	Ref.
2018	Best Score	First Man	Nominated	

=== New Mexico Film Critics ===
Year	Category	Nominated work	Result	Ref.
2018	Best Music/Score	First Man	Runner-up	

=== New York Film Critics Online ===
Year	Category	Nominated work	Result	Ref.
2016	Best Use of Music	La La Land	Won	

=== North Carolina Film Critics Association ===
Year	Category	Nominated work	Result	Ref.
2018	Best Music	First Man	Nominated	

=== Online Film Critics Society ===
Year	Category	Nominated work	Result	Ref.
2018	Best Original Score	First Man	Nominated	

=== Phoenix Critics Circle ===
Year	Category	Nominated work	Result	Ref.
2018	Best Score	First Man	Won	

=== Phoenix Film Critics Society ===
Year	Category	Nominated work	Result	Ref.
2018	Best Original Score	First Man	Won	

=== Producers Guild of America Awards ===
Year	Category	Nominated work	Result	Ref.
2018	Outstanding Production of Episodic Television, Comedy	Curb Your Enthusiasm	Nominated	

=== San Francisco Film Critics Circle ===
Year	Category	Nominated work	Result	Ref.
2016	Best Original Score	La La Land	Nominated	
2018	Best Original Score	First Man	Nominated	

=== Satellite Awards ===
Year	Category	Nominated work	Result	Ref.
2017	Best Original Song ("Audition (The Fools Who Dream)")	La La Land	Nominated	
2017	Best Original Song ("City of Stars")	La La Land	Won	
2017	Best Original Score	La La Land	Won	
2018	Best Original Score	First Man	Won	

=== Seattle Film Critics Society ===
Year	Category	Nominated work	Result	Ref.
2018	Best Original Score	First Man	Nominated	

=== St. Louis Gateway Film Critics Association ===
Year	Category	Nominated work	Result	Ref.
2016	Best Score	La La Land	Won	
2016	Best Song ("Audition (The Fools Who Dream)")	La La Land	Won	
2018	Best Score	First Man	Nominated	

=== Washington D.C. Area Film Critics Association ===
Year	Category	Nominated work	Result	Ref.
2016	Best Score	La La Land	Won	
2018	Best Score	First Man	Nominated	

=== Writers Guild of America Awards ===
Year	Category	Nominated work	Result	Ref.
2018	Outstanding Writing for a Comedy Series	Curb Your Enthusiasm	Nominated	
2021	Outstanding Writing for a Comedy Series	Curb Your Enthusiasm	Nominated	
