= Stefania Gladki =

Russian-French figure skater (born 2010)

Personal information
- Native name: Стефания Павловна Гладкая (Russian)
- Full name: Stefania Pavlovna Gladki
- Other names: Stefania Gladkaya
- Born: 28 May 2010 (age 16) Moscow, Russia
- Home town: Nice, France
- Height: 1.53 m (5 ft 0 in)

Figure skating career
- Country: France
- Discipline: Women's singles
- Coach: Svetlana Panova; Tatiana Moiseeva; Cédric Tour
- Skating club: Nice Baie des Anges Association
- Began skating: 2014

Medal record
French Championships
Gold medal – first place	2025 Annecy	Singles
Gold medal – first place	2026 Briancon	Singles
Silver medal – second place	2024 Vaujany	Singles

Stefania Pavlovna Gladki or Stefania Gladkaya (Russian: Стефания Павловна Гладкая; born 28 May 2010) is a Russian-French figure skater who currently competes for France. She is a two-time French national champion (2025–26) and the 2024 French national silver medalist. She is the youngest-ever French national champion, winning her first title at age 14.

At the junior level, Gladki is the 2024 JGP Czech Republic silver medalist, the 2024 and 2026 JGP Turkey bronze medalist, the 2026 JGP Georgia bronze medalist and the 2024 French junior national champion.

== Personal life ==
Gladki was born on 28 May 2010 in Moscow, Russia. Growing up with a French father with Ukrainian roots and Russian mother, Gladki is able to communicate in both languages fluently. In addition, she has family members that reside in Canada.

She is currently enrolled in Russian and French online schooling.

Additionally, she looks up to training mate, Adam Siao Him Fa.

== Career ==
=== Early career ===
In 2014, Gladki's parents signed her up for figure skating at the age three-and-a-half as a means to help improve her allergies. At the age of six, her parents decided that their daughter would represent France should she eventually compete internationally and thus registered her to the Nice Baie des Anges Association in Nice, France. She then began splitting her time between training in Nice and Moscow, and would compete at French and Russian domestic competitions. Gladki's early coaches included, Natalia Mankevich, Irina Lobacheva, and Alexander Mandrikov. She officially began competing for France internationally in 2023.

=== 2023–24 season: International junior debut ===
Prior to the season, it was announced that Gladki would split her time between training in Moscow under Svetlana Panova and Tatiana Moiseeva, and in Nice under Cédric Tour.

She made her international junior debut for France at the 2023 JGP Austria where she finished just off the podium in 4th. At her second JGP assignment of the season, the 2023 JGP Hungary, she placed 6th. In November 2023, she won the silver medal in the junior women's event at the 2023 Bosphorus Cup between Georgian skater Inga Gurgenidze and Czech entrant Barbora Tykalová.

Gladki competed at both the junior and senior French Championships, despite not being eligible to compete at the senior level internationally, and earned medals at both events, becoming the 2024 French national silver medalist and junior national champion at just 13. Due to her win at junior nationals, Gladki was assigned to compete at 2024 World Junior Championships in February, where she placed ninth. This was the best placement for a French women at the event since Fanny Cagnard achieved the same result in 1998.

=== 2024–25 season ===
During the summer off-season, Gladki would work with Rafael and Vera Arutyunyan in Irvine, California.

Gladki opened her second junior international season back on the Junior Grand Prix circuit at the 2024 JGP Czech Republic. There, she won the silver medal behind Japanese debutante Kaoruko Wada and Korean skater Kim Yu-jae. At her next assignment, the 2024 JGP Turkey, she won bronze behind Korean champion Kim Yu-seong and Japanese silver medalist Ami Nakai. With these results, Gladki qualified for the 2024–25 Junior Grand Prix Final in Grenoble, France. She was the first Frenchwoman to qualify for the Final since Gwenaëlle Jullien during the 1998–99 edition.

Following her JGP events, Gladki competed at the 2024 Master's de Patinage where she won gold on the junior level for a second consecutive time. She competed the short program segment at the 2024 Trophée Métropole Nice Côte d'Azur; however, the junior women's free skate event was cancelled due to poor weather conditions. Gladki was awarded the gold medal based on her short program result. In late December, Gladki competed at the Junior Grand Prix Final, where she finished in sixth place. Two weeks later, she competed on the senior level and won the 2025 French Championships at only fourteen years old.

Gladki finished her season at the 2025 World Junior Championships in Debrecen, where she placed ninth in the short program with a new personal best score of 62.62 points. In the free skate she landed all of her seven planned triple jumps and rose to fifth overall, with a score just shy of her personal best for the segment. Gladki said she was "very pleased" with the result.

In an interview in June, Gladki shared her goals for the 2025–26 figure skating season: “My goals are podium finishes at the Junior Grand Prix and, of course, to give my absolute best effort to qualify for the Final next season. Especially since it will be held in Japan. I’ve always dreamed of visiting Japan, and this would be such a great opportunity.”

=== 2025–26 season ===
Gladki began the season by competing on the 2025–26 Junior Grand Prix, finishing seventh at 2025 JGP Turkey and ninth at 2025 JGP Thailand. She followed these results up by winning bronze on the junior level at the 2025 Trophée Métropole Nice Côte d'Azur and gold on the junior level at the 2025 Bosphorus Cup.

In December, Gladki competed on the senior level at the 2026 French Championships, winning the gold medal for a second consecutive time. In March, Stefania finished 16th at the 2026 World Junior Championships.

=== 2026–27 season ===
Gladki opened her season at the Junior Grand Prix stage in Turkey. After placing seventh in the short program, she rose to third in the free skate and third overall, claiming the bronze medal. In the free skating segment, despite falling on her attempt, Stefania attempted a quadruple toe loop jump for the first time. She followed this up by winning bronze in Georgia the following week. She landed her quadruple toe loop, but it lacked a quarter of rotation; thus it was not ratified.

== Programs ==
Season	Short program	Free skate	Exhibition	Ref.
2023–24	Ondine by Maurice Ravel performed by Benjamin Grosvenor choreo. by Ilona Protasenia, Maria Kasumova, Vera Arutyunyan, Anna Novichkina	Invierno Porteño by Astor Piazzolla performed by Gidon Kremer choreo. by Ilona Protasenia, Maria Kasumova, Vera Arutyunyan, Anna Novichkina		
2024–25	Please Don't Make Me Love You (from Dracula, the Musical) performed by Maria Sobko choreo. by Nadezhda Kanaeva, Ilona Protasenia	Moulin Rouge!: Diamonds Are a Girl's Best Friend performed by Elisa's; One Day I'll Fly Away performed by Nicole Kidman; The Show Must Go On performed by Jim Broadbent & Nicole Kidman choreo. by Maria Kasumova	Piano Sonata in A minor, D 845, I. Moderato by Franz Schubert performed by Richard Goode; Rosa (Qué Linda Eres) by Trinix Remix	
2025–26	Piano Concerto No. 1, Op. 11 by Frédéric Chopin choreo. by Nadezhda Kanaeva, Ilona Protasenia	The Braid (from La Tresse) by Ludovico Einaudi; A Time for Us (from Romeo and Juliet) by Nino Rota choreo. by Maria Kasumova		
2026–27	Your Song by Cédric Tour, Ellie Goulding and Elton John	La La Land: Mia & Sebastian's Theme (Late for the date); Another Day Of Sun by Justin Hurwitz; Audition (The Fools Who Dream) by Emma Stone and Justin Hurwitz choreo. by Benoit Richaud	La La Land	

== Competitive highlights ==
- JGP – Event of the ISU Junior Grand Prix Series
- TBD – Assigned
- WD – Withdrew from competition

Competition placements at senior level
Season	2023–24	2024–25	2025–26
French Championships	2nd	1st	1st

Competition placements at junior level
Season	2022–23	2023–24	2024–25	2025–26	2026–27
World Junior Championships		9th	5th	16th	
French Championships		1st			
Junior Grand Prix Final			6th		
JGP Austria		4th			
JGP Czech Republic			2nd		
JGP Hungary		6th			
JGP Georgia					3rd
JGP Turkey			3rd	7th	3rd
JGP Thailand				9th	
Bavarian Open				3rd	
Bosphorus Cup		2nd		1st	
Master's de Patinage	2nd	1st	1st		
Trophée Métropole Nice			1st	3rd	

== Detailed results ==
ISU personal best scores in the +5/-5 GOE System
Segment	Type	Score	Event
Total	**TSS**	**189.92**	2026 JGP Georgia
Short program	**TSS**	**67.94**	2026 JGP Georgia
Short program	TES	40.48	2026 JGP Georgia
Short program	PCS	27.59	2025 World Junior Championships
Free skating	**TSS**	**121.98**	2026 JGP Georgia
Free skating	TES	67.42	2024 JGP Turkey
Free skating	PCS	56.22	2026 JGP Georgia

=== Senior results ===
Results in the 2023–24 season
Date	Event	SP		FS		Total	
Date	Event	P	Score	P	Score	P	Score
Dec 11–14, 2023	(France) 2024 French Championships	2	60.31	2	124.24	2	184.55

Results in the 2024–25 season
Date	Event	SP		FS		Total	
Date	Event	P	Score	P	Score	P	Score
Dec 20–21, 2024	(France) 2025 French Championships	1	67.50	1	132.28	1	199.78

Results in the 2025–26 season
Date	Event	SP		FS		Total	
Date	Event	P	Score	P	Score	P	Score
Dec 18–20, 2025	(France) 2026 French Championships	2	64.01	1	134.04	1	198.05

=== Junior results ===
Current personal best scores are highlighted in bold.

Results in the 2026–27 season
Date	Event	SP		FS		Total	
Date	Event	P	Score	P	Score	P	Score
Sep 17–19, 2026	2026 JGP Turkey	7	61.57	3	118.07	3	179.64
Sep 24–26, 2026	(Georgia (country)) 2026 JGP Georgia	3	67.94	3	121.98	3	189.92

Results in the 2025–26 season
Date	Event	SP		FS		Total	
Date	Event	P	Score	P	Score	P	Score
Aug 27–30, 2025	2025 JGP Turkey	8	58.12	4	115.62	7	173.74
Oct 1–5, 2025	(France) 2025 Trophée Métropole Nice Côte d'Azur	2	60.80	3	113.75	3	174.55
Nov 24–30, 2025	(Turkey) 2025 Bosphorus Cup	2	63.36	2	111.80	1	175.16
Jan 27 – Feb 1, 2026	(Germany) 2026 Bavarian Open	4	53.89	3	116.95	3	170.84
Mar 3-8, 2026	(Estonia) 2026 World Junior Championships	14	58.65	16	109.36	16	168.01

2024–25 season
Date	Event	SP	FS	Total
February 25–March 2, 2025	2025 World Junior Championships	9; 62.62	5; 121.67	5; 184.29
December 5–8, 2024	2024–25 Junior Grand Prix Final	6; 62.31	6; 113.08	6; 175.39
October 16–20, 2024	2024 Trophée Métropole Nice	1; 65.75	C	1; 65.75
September 26–28, 2024	2024 Master's de Patinage	1; 63.73	1; 124.89	1; 188.62
September 18–21, 2024	2024 JGP Turkey	5; 60.42	3; 121.90	3; 182.32
September 4–9, 2024	2024 JGP Czech Republic	3; 61.45	2; 121.16	2; 182.61
2023–24 season
Date	Event	SP	FS	Total
February 26–March 3, 2024	2024 World Junior Championships	10; 58.65	9; 115.19	9; 173.84
January 12–14, 2024	2024 French Junior Championships	1; 64.91	1; 127.50	1; 192.41
November 27–December 3, 2023	2023 Bosphorus Cup	2; 60.59	2; 107.86	2; 168.45
September 28–30, 2023	2023 Master's de Patinage	1; 59.81	1; 112.87	1; 184.55
September 20–23, 2023	2023 JGP Hungary	9; 58.52	7; 105.61	6; 164.13
August 30–September 2, 2023	2023 JGP Austria	3; 59.32	7; 102.97	4; 162.29
2022–23 season
Date	Event	SP	FS	Total
October 6–8, 2022	2022 Master's de Patinage	2; 48.99	2; 87.87	2; 136.86
