= La La Land (soundtrack) =

La La Land: Original Motion Picture Soundtrack

Soundtrack album by various artists
- Released: December 9, 2016
- Recorded: 2016
- Genres: Show tunes; jazz pop
- Length: 45:53
- Label: Interscope
- Producers: Justin Hurwitz; Marius de Vries; Steven Gizicki

Justin Hurwitz chronology
Whiplash (2014)	La La Land (2016)	First Man (2018)

Pasek and Paul chronology
La La Land (2016)	Dear Evan Hansen: Original Broadway Cast Recording (2017)

La La Land: Original Motion Picture Soundtrack is the soundtrack album to the 2016 film La La Land. The soundtrack album was released through Interscope Records on December 9, 2016. The album has peaked at number 2 on the US Billboard 200 and number 1 on the UK Albums Chart. At the 89th Academy Awards, the film won the Academy Awards for Best Original Score and Best Original Song for "City of Stars".

== Composition ==
The songs and score for La La Land were composed and orchestrated by Justin Hurwitz, film director Damien Chazelle's Harvard University classmate, who also worked on his two prior films. The lyrics were written by Benj Pasek and Justin Paul, except for "Start a Fire", which was written by John Legend, Hurwitz and Marius de Vries.

== Track listing ==
La La Land: Original Motion Picture Soundtrack
No.	Title	Performers	Length
1.	"Another Day of Sun"	La La Land Cast	3:48
2.	"Someone in the Crowd"	Emma Stone, Callie Hernandez, Sonoya Mizuno and Jessica Rothe	4:20
3.	"Mia & Sebastian's Theme"	Justin Hurwitz	1:38
4.	"A Lovely Night"	Ryan Gosling and Emma Stone	3:57
5.	"Herman's Habit"	Justin Hurwitz	1:52
6.	"City of Stars"	Ryan Gosling	1:51
7.	"Planetarium"	Justin Hurwitz	4:17
8.	"Summer Montage / Madeline"	Justin Hurwitz	2:05
9.	"City of Stars"	Ryan Gosling and Emma Stone	2:30
10.	"Start a Fire"	John Legend	3:12
11.	"Engagement Party"	Justin Hurwitz	1:27
12.	"Audition (The Fools Who Dream)"	Emma Stone	3:48
13.	"Epilogue"	Justin Hurwitz	7:39
14.	"The End"	Justin Hurwitz	0:46
15.	"City of Stars (Humming)" (featuring Emma Stone)	Justin Hurwitz	2:43
Total length:			45:53

La La Land: Original Motion Picture Score
No.	Title	Performers	Length
1.	"Mia Gets Home"	Justin Hurwitz	0:27
2.	"Bathroom Mirror / You're Coming Right?"	Justin Hurwitz	1:23
3.	"Classic Rope-a-Dope"	Justin Hurwitz	0:45
4.	"Mia & Sebastian's Theme"	Justin Hurwitz	1:37
5.	"Stroll up the Hill"	Justin Hurwitz	0:49
6.	"There the Whole Time / Twirl"	Justin Hurwitz	0:44
7.	"Bogart & Bergman"	Justin Hurwitz	2:11
8.	"Mia Hates Jazz"	Justin Hurwitz	1:10
9.	"Herman's Habit"	Justin Hurwitz	1:52
10.	"Rialto at Ten"	Justin Hurwitz	1:38
11.	"Rialto"	Justin Hurwitz	0:28
12.	"Mia & Sebastian's Theme (Late for the Date)"	Justin Hurwitz	1:30
13.	"Planetarium"	Justin Hurwitz	4:19
14.	"Holy Hell"	Justin Hurwitz	0:42
15.	"Summer Montage / Madeline"	Justin Hurwitz	2:04
16.	"It Pays"	Justin Hurwitz	2:12
17.	"Chicken on a Stick"	Justin Hurwitz	1:40
18.	"City of Stars / May Finally Come True" (featuring Ryan Gosling and Emma Stone)	Justin Hurwitz	4:18
19.	"Chinatown"	Justin Hurwitz	1:23
20.	"Surprise"	Justin Hurwitz	1:30
21.	"Boise"	Justin Hurwitz	1:13
22.	"Missed the Play"	Justin Hurwitz	0:36
23.	"It's Over / Engagement Party"	Justin Hurwitz	1:35
24.	"The House in Front of the Library"	Justin Hurwitz	0:31
25.	"You Love Jazz Now"	Justin Hurwitz	0:51
26.	"Cincinnati"	Justin Hurwitz	2:06
27.	"Epilogue"	Justin Hurwitz	7:39
28.	"The End"	Justin Hurwitz	0:46
29.	"Credits"	Justin Hurwitz	3:40
30.	"Mia & Sebastian's Theme (Celesta)"	Justin Hurwitz	1:28
Total length:			53:07

La La Land: The Complete Musical Experience
No.	Title	Performers	Length
1.	"Another Day of Sun (With Radios)"	La La Land Cast	4:34
2.	"Mia Gets Home"	Justin Hurwitz	0:24
3.	"Bathroom Mirror / You're Coming Right?"	Justin Hurwitz	1:19
4.	"Someone in the Crowd"	Emma Stone, Callie Hernandez, Sonoya Mizuno, and Jessica Rothe	4:19
5.	"Classic Rope-a-Dope"	Justin Hurwitz	0:46
6.	"Japanese Folk Song"	Thelonious Monk	1:40
7.	"Deck the Halls"	Justin Hurwitz	0:32
8.	"Mia & Sebastian's Theme"	Justin Hurwitz	1:38
9.	"Take On Me"	D.A.	3:00
10.	"I Ran"	D.A.	3:37
11.	"Stroll up the Hill"	Justin Hurwitz	0:45
12.	"A Lovely Night"	Ryan Gosling and Emma Stone	4:00
13.	"There the Whole Time / Twirl"	Justin Hurwitz	0:44
14.	"Bogart & Bergman"	Justin Hurwitz	2:11
15.	"Mia Hates Jazz"	Justin Hurwitz	1:10
16.	"Herman's Habit"	Justin Hurwitz	1:51
17.	"Rialto at Ten"	Justin Hurwitz	1:38
18.	"City of Stars"	Ryan Gosling	1:51
19.	"Rialto"	Justin Hurwitz	0:28
20.	"Mia & Sebastian's Theme (Late for the Date)"	Justin Hurwitz	1:30
21.	"Planetarium"	Justin Hurwitz	4:20
22.	"Holy Hell!"	Justin Hurwitz	0:42
23.	"Summer Montage / Madeline"	Justin Hurwitz	2:04
24.	"It Pays"	Justin Hurwitz	2:12
25.	"Chicken on a Stick"	Justin Hurwitz	1:39
26.	"Messengers Rehearsal"	The Messengers	1:02
27.	"City of Stars / May Finally Come True" (featuring Ryan Gosling and Emma Stone)	Justin Hurwitz	4:10
28.	"Start a Fire"	John Legend	3:11
29.	"Chinatown"	Justin Hurwitz	1:22
30.	"Surprise"	Justin Hurwitz	1:30
31.	"Boise"	Justin Hurwitz	1:14
32.	"Missed the Play"	Justin Hurwitz	0:37
33.	"It's Over / Engagement Party"	Justin Hurwitz	1:35
34.	"The House in Front of the Library"	Justin Hurwitz	0:31
35.	"Audition (The Fools Who Dream)"	Emma Stone	4:12
36.	"You Love Jazz Now"	Justin Hurwitz	0:51
37.	"Cincinnati"	Justin Hurwitz	2:06
38.	"Epilogue"	Justin Hurwitz	7:41
39.	"The End"	Justin Hurwitz	0:45
40.	"Credits"	Justin Hurwitz	3:39
41.	"City of Stars (Humming)" (featuring Emma Stone)	Justin Hurwitz	2:40
42.	"Mia & Sebastian's Theme (Celesta)"	Justin Hurwitz	1:26
43.	"Silent Night"	Eddie Wakes	2:47
44.	"Audition (The Fools Who Dream) (Studio Version)"	Emma Stone	3:29
Total length:			93:42

== Awards ==
Awards
Award	Date of ceremony	Category	Recipient(s) and nominee(s)	Result	Ref.
Hollywood Music in Media Awards	November 17, 2016	Best Original Score – Feature Film	Justin Hurwitz	Nominated	
Los Angeles Film Critics Association	December 4, 2016	Best Music	Justin Hurwitz, Pasek and Paul	Won	
Critics' Choice Movie Awards	December 11, 2016	Best Score	Justin Hurwitz	Won	
Critics' Choice Movie Awards	December 11, 2016	Best Song	"Audition (The Fools Who Dream)"	Nominated	
Critics' Choice Movie Awards	December 11, 2016	Best Song	"City of Stars"	Won	
San Francisco Film Critics Circle	December 11, 2016	Best Original Score	Justin Hurwitz	Nominated	
San Diego Film Critics Society	December 12, 2016	Best Original Score	La La Land	Runner Up	
Dallas–Fort Worth Film Critics Association	December 13, 2016	Best Musical Score	Justin Hurwitz	Won	
Chicago Film Critics Association	December 15, 2016	Best Original Score	Justin Hurwitz	Nominated	
St. Louis Gateway Film Critics Association	December 18, 2016	Best Music/Score	Justin Hurwitz	Won	
St. Louis Gateway Film Critics Association	December 18, 2016	Best Soundtrack	La La Land	Runner Up	
St. Louis Gateway Film Critics Association	December 18, 2016	Best Song	"Audition (The Fools Who Dream)"	Won	
St. Louis Gateway Film Critics Association	December 18, 2016	Best Song	"City of Stars"	Runner Up	
IndieWire Critics Poll	December 19, 2016	Best Original Score or Soundtrack	La La Land	2nd Place	
Houston Film Critics Society	January 6, 2017	Best Original Score	Justin Hurwitz	Won	
Houston Film Critics Society	January 6, 2017	Best Original Song	"Audition (The Fools Who Dream)"	Nominated	
Houston Film Critics Society	January 6, 2017	Best Original Song	"City of Stars"	Won	
Golden Globe Awards	January 8, 2017	Best Original Score	Justin Hurwitz	Won	
Golden Globe Awards	January 8, 2017	Best Original Song	"City of Stars"	Won	
Denver Film Critics Society	January 16, 2017	Best Original Score	Justin Hurwitz	Won	
British Academy Film Awards	February 12, 2017	Best Film Music	Justin Hurwitz	Won	
Satellite Awards	February 19, 2017	Best Original Score	Justin Hurwitz	Won	
Satellite Awards	February 19, 2017	Best Original Song	"Audition (The Fools Who Dream)"	Nominated	
Satellite Awards	February 19, 2017	Best Original Song	"City of Stars"	Won	
Academy Awards	February 26, 2017	Best Original Score	Justin Hurwitz	Won	
Academy Awards	February 26, 2017	Best Original Song	"Audition (The Fools Who Dream)"	Nominated	
Academy Awards	February 26, 2017	Best Original Song	"City of Stars"	Won	
Grammy Awards	January 28, 2018	Best Compilation Soundtrack for Visual Media	La La Land	Won	
Grammy Awards	January 28, 2018	Best Score Soundtrack for Visual Media	Justin Hurwitz	Won	
Grammy Awards	January 28, 2018	Best Song Written for Visual Media	"City of Stars" by Justin Hurwitz, Benj Pasek, and Justin Paul	Nominated	
Grammy Awards	January 28, 2018	Best Arrangement, Instrumental and Vocals	"Another Day of Sun" by Justin Hurwitz, Benj Pasek, and Justin Paul	Nominated	

== Charts ==
=== Weekly charts ===
Chart (2017)	Peak position
Australian Albums (ARIA)	7
Australia Jazz & Blues Albums (ARIA)	1
Austrian Albums (Ö3 Austria)	7
Belgian Albums (Ultratop Flanders)	6
Belgian Albums (Ultratop Wallonia)	4
Brazilian Albums (ABPD)	6
Canadian Albums (Billboard)	3
Czech Albums (ČNS IFPI)	6
Danish Albums (Hitlisten)	9
Dutch Albums (Album Top 100)	13
Finnish Albums (Suomen virallinen lista)	8
French Albums (SNEP)	2
German Albums (Offizielle Top 100)	7
Greek Albums (IFPI)	1
Hungarian Albums (MAHASZ)	11
Irish Compilation Albums Chart (IRMA)	2
Italian Compilation Albums (FIMI)	1
Japan Hot Albums (Billboard)	1
Japan Top Album Sales (Billboard)	7
Japan Weekly Albums (Oricon)	3
Mexican Albums (AMPROFON)	7
New Zealand Albums (RMNZ)	17
Norwegian Albums (VG-lista)	10
Polish Albums (ZPAV)	4
Scottish Albums (Official Charts)	1
South Korean Albums (Gaon)	7
South Korean Albums International (Gaon)	1
Spanish Albums (Promusicae)	1
Swiss Albums (Schweizer Hitparade)	3
UK Albums (Official Charts)	1
UK Soundtrack Albums (Official Charts)	1
US Billboard 200	2
US Soundtrack Albums (Billboard)	1

=== Year-end charts ===
Chart (2017)	Position
Australian Albums (ARIA)	68
Belgian Albums (Ultratop Flanders)	43
Belgian Albums (Ultratop Wallonia)	47
Dutch Albums (MegaCharts)	86
French Albums (SNEP)	32
German Albums (Offizielle Top 100)	98
Mexican Albums (AMPROFON)	72
Polish Albums (ZPAV)	27
Spanish Albums (PROMUSICAE)	9
Swiss Albums (Schweizer Hitparade)	67
UK Albums (OCC)	36
US Billboard 200	53
US Soundtrack Albums (Billboard)	5

Chart (2018)	Position
French Albums (SNEP)	180
Spanish Albums (PROMUSICAE)	51

== Certifications ==
Region	Certification	Certified units/sales
Denmark (IFPI Danmark)	Gold	10,000^{‡}
France (SNEP)	Platinum	100,000^{‡}
Germany (BVMI)	Gold	100,000^{‡}
Italy (FIMI)	Platinum	50,000^{‡}
Japan (RIAJ)	Gold	100,000^{^}
New Zealand (RMNZ)	Gold	7,500^{‡}
Poland (ZPAV)	Platinum	20,000^{‡}
Singapore (RIAS)	Gold	5,000^{*}
South Korea (Gaon Chart)	—	28,095
Spain (Promusicae)	Platinum	40,000^{‡}
United Kingdom (BPI)	Gold	147,000
United States (RIAA)	Gold	500,000^{‡}
^{*} Sales figures based on certification alone.^{^} Shipments figures based on certification alone.^{‡} Sales+streaming figures based on certification alone.
