= A Lovely Night =

A Lovely Night may refer to:

- "A Lovely Night", a song from the Rodgers and Hammerstein musical Cinderella
- "A Lovely Night", a song from the 2016 film La La Land
