= Houston Film Critics Society Awards 2016 =

Annual US film awards ceremony

10th Houston Film Critics Society Awards
- Date: January 6, 2017
- Location: Sundance Cinemas Houston, Houston, Texas
- Presented by: Houston Film Critics Society
- Website: www.houstonfilmcritics.com/awards

The 10th Houston Film Critics Society Awards nominations were announced on December 12, 2016. The ceremony was held on January 6, 2017.

== Winners and nominees ==
Winners are listed first and highlighted with boldface.

Best Picture	Best Foreign Language Film
**La La Land**; Arrival; The Handmaiden; Hell or High Water; Jackie; Lion; Manchester by the Sea; Moonlight; The Nice Guys; Nocturnal Animals	**The Handmaiden • South Korea**; Elle • France; A Man Called Ove • Sweden; Neruda • Chile; Toni Erdmann • Germany
Best Actor	Best Actress
**Casey Affleck - Manchester by the Sea**; Andrew Garfield - Hacksaw Ridge; Ryan Gosling - La La Land; Jake Gyllenhaal - Nocturnal Animals; Viggo Mortensen - Captain Fantastic; Denzel Washington - Fences	**Natalie Portman - Jackie**; Amy Adams - Arrival; Rebecca Hall - Christine; Isabelle Huppert - Elle; Emma Stone - La La Land
Best Supporting Actor	Best Supporting Actress
**Jeff Bridges - Hell or High Water**; Ben Foster - Hell or High Water; Lucas Hedges - Manchester by the Sea; Dev Patel - Lion; Michael Shannon - Nocturnal Animals	**Viola Davis - Fences**; Greta Gerwig - 20th Century Women; Naomie Harris - Moonlight; Octavia Spencer - Hidden Figures; Michelle Williams - Manchester by the Sea
Best Director	Best Cinematography
**Damien Chazelle - La La Land**; Barry Jenkins - Moonlight; Kenneth Lonergan - Manchester by the Sea; David Mackenzie - Hell or High Water; Denis Villeneuve - Arrival	**La La Land - Linus Sandgren**; Jackie - Stéphane Fontaine; Moonlight - James Laxton; Nocturnal Animals - Seamus McGarvey; Arrival - Bradford Young
Best Animated Feature Film	Best Documentary Feature
**Kubo and the Two Strings**; Finding Dory; Moana; Sausage Party; Zootopia	**O.J.: Made in America**; 13th; Tower; Weiner; Zero Days
Best Original Score	Best Original Song
**La La Land - Justin Hurwitz**; Moonlight - Nicholas Britell; Arrival - Jóhann Jóhannsson; Jackie - Mica Levi; Nocturnal Animals - Abel Korzeniowski	**"City of Stars" by Justin Hurwitz and Pasek and Paul - La La Land**; "Audition (The Fools Who Dream)" by Justin Hurwitz and Pasek and Paul - La La Land; "Drive It Like You Stole It" by Gary Clark - Sing Street; "How Far I'll Go" by Lin-Manuel Miranda - Moana; "Runnin'" by Pharrell Williams - Hidden Figures
Best Screenplay	Best Poster
**Hell or High Water - Taylor Sheridan**; La La Land - Damien Chazelle; Arrival - Eric Heisserer; Moonlight - Barry Jenkins and Tarell Alvin McCraney; Manchester by the Sea - Kenneth Lonergan	**La La Land**; Captain Fantastic; Hunt for the Wilderpeople; Jackie; Moonlight
Texas Independent Film Award	Technical Achievement
**Tower**; Krisha; Slash; A Song for You; Southwest of Salem	**La La Land (Production Design)**; Doctor Strange (Visual Effects); The Jungle Book (Visual Effects)
Worst Film
**Zoolander 2**; Gods of Egypt; Independence Day: Resurgence; Mike and Dave Need Wedding Dates; Yoga Hosers

== Movies with multiple nominations and awards ==
The following films received multiple nominations:

Nominations	Film
11	La La Land
7	Moonlight
6	Arrival
6	Manchester by the Sea
5	Hell or High Water
5	Jackie
5	Nocturnal Animals
2	Captain Fantastic
2	Elle
2	Fences
2	The Handmaiden
2	Hidden Figures
2	Lion
2	Moana
2	Tower

The following films received multiple awards:

Wins	Film
7	La La Land
2	Hell or High Water
