= Mia & Sebastian's Theme =

Instrumental by Justin Hurwitz

Instrumental by Justin Hurwitz

from the album La La Land: Original Motion Picture Soundtrack
- Released: December 9, 2016
- Length: 1:36
- Label: Interscope
- Composer: Justin Hurwitz
- Producers: Justin Hurwitz; Marius de Vries

"Mia & Sebastian's Theme" is an instrumental by Justin Hurwitz that appears in the 2016 musical film La La Land. It first appears during a scene between the film's two main characters, where Mia (Emma Stone) hears Sebastian (Ryan Gosling) playing it. The piece, and variations of it, recurs throughout the rest of the film. The first piece composed for La La Land, "Mia & Sebastian's Theme" represents Sebastian's character and his romantic relationship with Mia. Hurwitz found it difficult to compose due to its significance for the rest of the score and challenges in balancing the tone.

== Context ==
"Mia & Sebastian's Theme" first appears near the beginning of La La Land. Mia (Emma Stone) hears the piece and walks into a bar, where Sebastian (Ryan Gosling) is playing it. Hurwitz said that it is characterized by senses of yearning, hope, pain, and sweetness and is "about somebody who doesn't have what they want and doesn't know what they want". A later version of the theme, subtitled "Late for the Date", recurs throughout the score. Other pieces in the film's score, including "Planetarium" and "Epilogue", build on "Mia & Sebastian's Theme".

== Background and writing ==
Damien Chazelle wrote the screenplay for La La Land in 2010. His idea was "to take the old musical but ground it in real life where things don't always exactly work out", and to salute creative people who move to Los Angeles to chase their dreams. He conceived the film's concept while he was a student at Harvard University with his classmate Justin Hurwitz. Hurwitz described the music as an "unbelievable amount of work and an unbelievable amount of passion". When writing the film's songs and score, he focused on whether the audience would remember them after watching La La Land. Hurwitz began by writing themes for the film and characters, some of which turned into songs.

"Mia and Sebastian's Theme (Late for the Date)" was the first piece that Hurwitz wrote for La La Land. He wanted to avoid "old-fashioned" and "contemporary" sounds, instead aiming for a "timeless" quality. Hurwitz aimed for it to represent both "an outpouring of Sebastian's soul" and the core of Mia and Sebastian's romantic relationship. He had difficulty finding the "yearning" tone because it required both sweetness and pain without too much of either. Before its completion, he created 30 versions, including several demos on the piano. He described writing the final melody as an "A-ha!" moment for him and Chazelle, where its suitability was immediately apparent. Hurwitz found "Mia & Sebastian's Theme" to be the most difficult piece to compose in the entire film due to its significance for the rest of the score.

Gosling learned the piece and performs it in the final film. He spent four months practicing with his piano teacher. The final recording features Randy Kerber's playing.

== Composition ==
The Hollywood Reporter described the piece as "bittersweet". Billboard called it "plaintive instrumental lullaby", and MuseScore said it was a "lilting waltz". The piece switches between major and minor within the same key, which, according to Hurwitz, gave it emotional complexity while avoiding mawkishness. "Mia & Sebastian's Theme" begins on the piano before incorporating strings that lead into a full orchestration.

== Reception ==
Screen Rant ranked the piece as the eighth-best song in La La Land, referring to it as one of the film's "most beautiful moments".
