= Matthew Decker (writer) =

Matthew Decker (born March 6, 1981) is an American theater director, screenwriter, and playwright from King of Prussia, Pennsylvania. With Erin Reilly, he co-founded Theatre Horizon in 2005, a professional theatre company in Norristown, PA where he served as Co-Artistic Director.

Decker has directed regionally at Theatre Horizon, the Arden Theatre Company, the Lantern Theatre Company, Cardinal Stage, 11th Hour Theatre Company, and Villanova University. For eight seasons, he served as the Associate Artistic Director at the Arden Theatre Company.

Decker is a graduate of the Tisch School of the Arts at New York University where he studied at the Atlantic Theater Company. He is a three-time Barrymore Award winner for Outstanding Direction of a Musical.

In 2023, it was announced that he would co-pen with Ayad Akhtar the libretto for the stage musical adaptation of Damien Chazelle's 2016 film La La Land, which will be directed by Bartlett Sher, with Justin Hurwitz and Pasek & Paul returning as songwriters.

== Awards ==
- 2016 Barrymore Award - Outstanding Direction of a Musical (The Stinky Cheese Man)
- 2015 Barrymore Award - Outstanding Direction of a Musical (Into the Woods)
- 2014 Barrymore Nomination - Outstanding Direction of a Play (Circle Mirror Transformation)
- 2011 Barrymore Award - Outstanding Direction of a Musical (The 25th Annual Putnam County Spelling Bee)
