= Another Day of Sun =

Opening song of the film La La Land

Song by cast of La La Land

from the album La La Land: Original Motion Picture Soundtrack
- Released: December 9, 2016
- Recorded: 2015–2016
- Genre: Musical theater; soundtrack
- Length: 3:48
- Label: Interscope
- Composer: Justin Hurwitz
- Lyricists: Benj Pasek; Justin Paul
- Producers: Justin Hurwitz; Marius de Vries

Audio sample
- "Another Day of Sun": file; help

Music video (film sequence)
- "Another Day of Sun" on YouTube

"Another Day of Sun" is the opening number from the 2016 musical film La La Land. The ensemble number portrays drivers in a Los Angeles traffic jam on a highway ramp singing and dancing about their aspirations to succeed in Hollywood. The song was filmed on location on a 130-foot-high express ramp of the Judge Harry Pregerson Interchange in three shots, edited with hidden cuts to give the illusion of a single six-minute take. The song was composed by Justin Hurwitz with lyrics by Benj Pasek and Justin Paul, and choreography by Mandy Moore.

== Composition and lyrics ==
Hurwitz noted the tension in the song between the aspirations of the singers and the uncertain outcome of their efforts, noting "It’s an optimistic song, but it’s also about unfulfilled dreams." Paul said, "You pursue that dream, and you go to bed and get up the next day, and it’s a gorgeous day. It encourages you in one breath, and in another breath doesn’t acknowledge that you just failed miserably. You wake up and it doesn’t match your mood. It’s a bright and shiny day."

The song is written in the key of E♭ major, with a tempo of 126 beats per minute. It generally follows an A♭–B♭–Cm–Gm chord progression, and has a vocal range for the various parts of G3–C5. Hurwitz composed the song with a fast-paced tempo predominantly using major keys, but often using minor keys as well, making it "more bittersweet than it may seem on its face" according to Hurwitz. The song also has densely layered background vocals and a full 95-piece orchestra and 40-person choir. Hurwitz tried to feature different elements of the orchestration as the visuals followed different members of the ensemble.

== Shooting and choreography ==
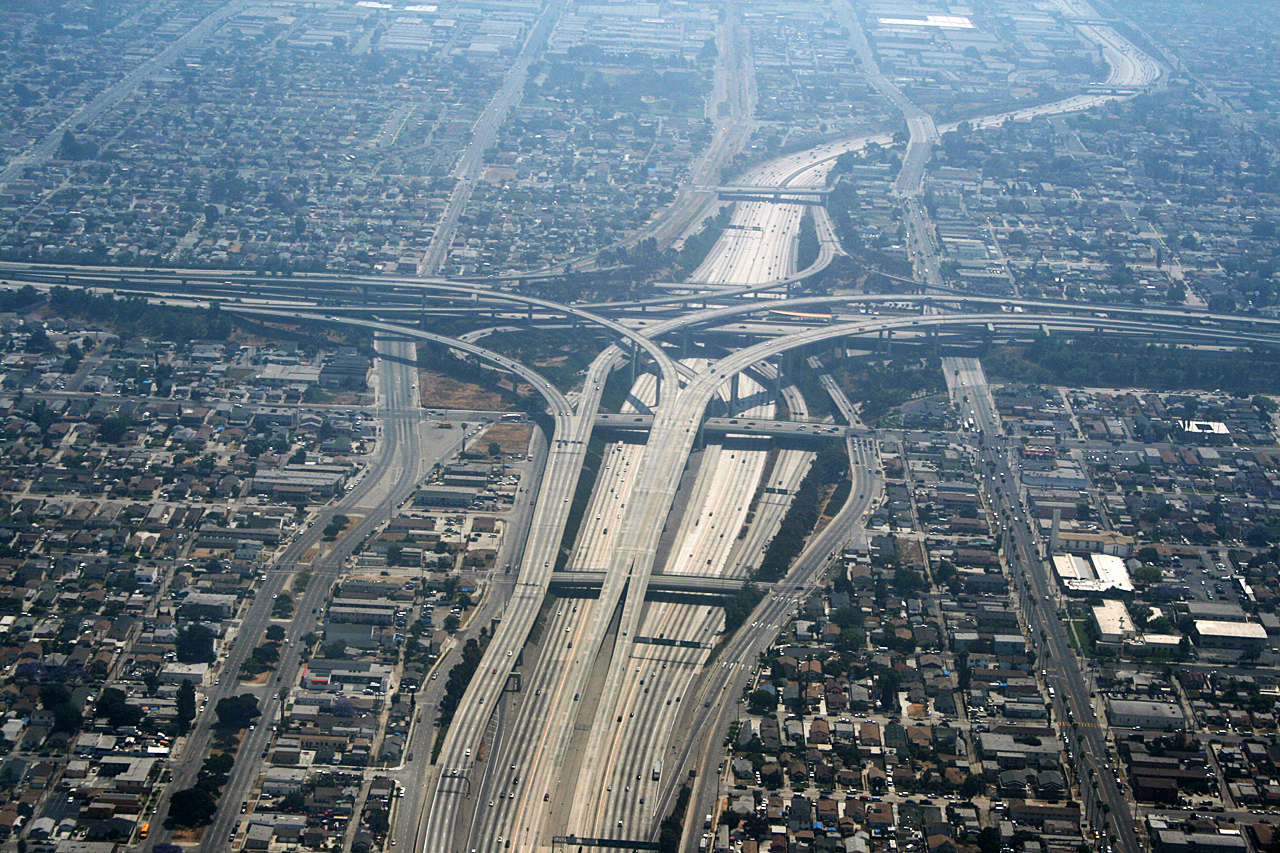
The Judge Harry Pregerson Interchange, where the scene with the song was filmed

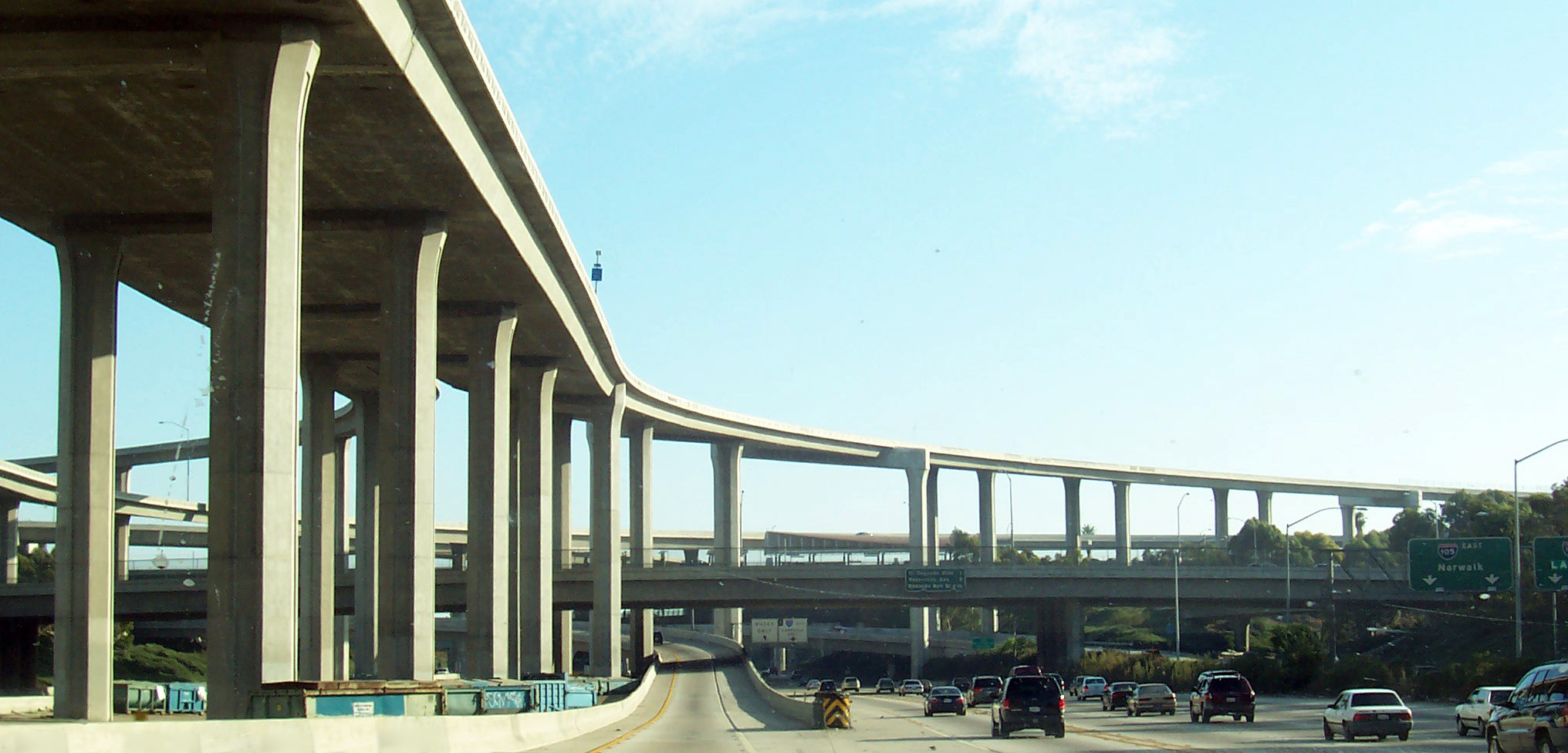
A view from below of the ramp used for the shooting

The sequence – the first of the film to be shot – was filmed over two days in August 2015. The song was filmed on a 130-foot-high express ramp of the Judge Harry Pregerson Interchange between the Harbor Freeway (Interstate 110) and the Glenn Anderson Freeway (Interstate 105) in South Los Angeles. The ramp was closed for the two full days of filming. The rest of the highway was left open, so that normal traffic is visible in the background. The sequence was initially planned to be on a ground-level ramp, but it was changed to the interchange to give a sense of the vastness of the city. Director Damien Chazelle also likened the number's location on a highway to the Yellow Brick Road in The Wizard of Oz.

The number was shot in three takes, which were edited to give the appearance of a single six-minute long take. Moore spent between three and four months preparing for the shoot, which involved over 60 cars, 30 dancers, and 100 extras. The number was choreographed with a single dancer at its beginning, with other dancers joining in incrementally, to avoid having everyone abruptly start dancing at once. The ensemble also included several stunt performers. Initial rehearsals with ten dancers occurred in a studio parking lot using about 20 staff members' cars.

The number was initially planned to be preceded by an overture, but during editing it was found that this slowed the opening too much. Film editor Tom Cross noted that Chazelle "realized that for people to accept that it's a musical, you have to announce it confidently at the beginning," and then they realized that displaying the film's title on the final beat of the song was sufficient to make the song itself serve as a kind of overture to the musical.

On screen, dancer Reshma Gajjar appears to sing the opening lines (and several others after that), but the lead female vocals were provided by vocalist Angela Parrish, who does not appear in the film. The filmmakers had hoped to find a woman "who could both sing and dance on camera" to launch the opening number, but ended up finding their dancer first and then had to conduct separate auditions for a vocalist during post-production in the spring of 2016. The first male voice heard is performed by Sam Stone.

== Other performances ==
The cold open of the 74th Golden Globe Awards in January 2017 featured a musical parody of "Another Day of Sun", "City of Stars", and "Planetarium" from La La Land, with altered lyrics. The "Another Day of Sun" segment featured limousines in a traffic jam en route to the awards, with the dance routine performed by characters from several works nominated for the awards that year. It was performed by host Jimmy Fallon and featured cameos by Nicole Kidman, Amy Adams, John Travolta, Sarah Paulson, Rami Malek, Kit Harington, and others.

Italian singer Mina released a version of the song, published by Sony Music and PDU on 9 February 2018. In 2022, Will Young, Jamie Winstone, Michael Owen, Charlotte Church, and Mark Feehily performed a version of "Another Day of Sun" in series 3 of the British version of The Masked Singer.

== Charts ==
Chart performance for "Another Day of Sun"
Chart (2017)	Peak position
France (SNEP)	18
Hungary (Single Top 40)	16
Ireland (IRMA)	79
Portugal (AFP)	93
Scottish Singles Sales (Official Charts)	75
Spain (Promusicae)	67
UK Singles (Official Charts)	75

== Certifications ==
Certifications for "Another Day of Sun"
Region	Certification	Certified units/sales
France (SNEP)	Platinum	200,000^{‡}
Spain (Promusicae)	Gold	30,000^{‡}
United Kingdom (BPI)	Silver	200,000^{‡}
^{‡} Sales+streaming figures based on certification alone.

== Usage in media ==
The instrumental version of "Another Day of Sun" has been used as a theme tune for Sara Cox's teatime show on BBC Radio 2 since 2019.

== See also ==
- "Audition (The Fools Who Dream)"
- "City of Stars"
