= Los Angeles Film Critics Association Award for Best Music =

Annual US film award

The Los Angeles Film Critics Association Award for Best Music is one of the annual film awards given by the Los Angeles Film Critics Association.

== Winners ==
=== 1970s ===
Year	Film	Composer(s)
1976	Taxi Driver	Bernard Herrmann
1977	Star Wars	John Williams
1978	Midnight Express	Giorgio Moroder
1979	The Black Stallion	Carmine Coppola

=== 1980s ===
Year	Film	Composer(s)
1980	The Long Riders	Ry Cooder
1981	Ragtime	Randy Newman
1982	48 Hrs.	James Horner, The BusBoys
1983	Koyaanisqatsi	Philip Glass
1984	Once Upon a Time in America	Ennio Morricone
1985	Ran	Tōru Takemitsu
1986	Round Midnight	Herbie Hancock, Dexter Gordon
1987	The Last Emperor	David Byrne, Ryuichi Sakamoto, Cong Su
1988	The Moderns	Mark Isham
1989	Do the Right Thing	Bill Lee

=== 1990s ===
Year	Film	Composer(s)
1990	The Sheltering Sky	Richard Horowitz, Ryuichi Sakamoto
1991	The Double Life of Véronique (La double vie de Véronique)	Zbigniew Preisner
1991	At Play in the Fields of the Lord	Zbigniew Preisner
1991	Europa Europa	Zbigniew Preisner
1992	Damage	Zbigniew Preisner
1993	Blue (Bleu)	Zbigniew Preisner
1993	The Secret Garden	Zbigniew Preisner
1993	Olivier, Olivier	Zbigniew Preisner
1994	Ed Wood	Howard Shore
1995	A Little Princess	Patrick Doyle
1996	Kansas City	Hal Willner and The Hey Hey Club Musicians
1997	Kundun	Philip Glass
1998	The Butcher Boy	Elliot Goldenthal
1999	South Park: Bigger, Longer & Uncut	Trey Parker and Marc Shaiman

=== 2000s ===
Year	Film	Composer(s)
2000	Crouching Tiger, Hidden Dragon (Wo hu cang long)	Tan Dun
2001	The Lord of the Rings: The Fellowship of the Ring	Howard Shore
2002	Far from Heaven	Elmer Bernstein
2003	The Triplets of Belleville (Les triplets de Belleville)	Benoît Charest
2004	The Incredibles	Michael Giacchino
2005	Howl's Moving Castle (Hauru no ugoku shiro)	Joe Hisaishi, Youmi Kimura
2006	The Painted Veil	Alexandre Desplat
2006	The Queen	Alexandre Desplat
2007	Once	Glen Hansard, Marketa Irglova
2008	Slumdog Millionaire	A. R. Rahman
2009	Crazy Heart	T-Bone Burnett, Stephen Bruton

=== 2010s ===
Year	Film	Composer(s)
2010	The Ghost Writer	Alexandre Desplat
2010	The Social Network	Trent Reznor, Atticus Ross
2011	Hanna	The Chemical Brothers
2012	Beasts of the Southern Wild	Dan Romer, Benh Zeitlin
2013	Inside Llewyn Davis	T Bone Burnett
2014	Inherent Vice	Jonny Greenwood
2014	Under the Skin	Mica Levi
2015	Anomalisa	Carter Burwell
2015	Carol	Carter Burwell
2016	La La Land	Justin Hurwitz, Pasek and Paul
2017	Phantom Thread	Jonny Greenwood
2018	If Beale Street Could Talk	Nicholas Britell
2019	I Lost My Body	Dan Levy

=== 2020s ===
Year	Film	Composer(s)
2020	Soul	Trent Reznor, Atticus Ross
2021	Parallel Mothers	Alberto Iglesias
2022	RRR	M. M. Keeravani
2023	The Zone of Interest	Mica Levi
2024	Challengers	Trent Reznor, Atticus Ross
2025	Sirāt	Kangding Ray

== Multiple winners ==
3 wins

- Zbigniew Preisner (1991, 1992, 1993)
- Trent Reznor (2010, 2020, 2024)
- Atticus Ross (2010, 2020, 2024)

2 wins

- T-Bone Burnett (2009, 2013)
- Alexandre Desplat (2006, 2010)
- Philip Glass (1983, 1997)
- Jonny Greenwood (2014, 2017)
- Mica Levi (2014, 2023)
- Ryuichi Sakamoto (1987, 1990)
- Howard Shore (1994, 2001)
