= 2016 St. Louis Film Critics Association Awards =

Annual US film awards ceremony

13th StLFCA Awards

December 18, 2016

Best Film:
La La Land

Best Director:
Damien Chazelle
La La Land

The nominees for the 13th St. Louis Film Critics Association Awards were announced on December 11, 2016. The winners announced on December 18, 2016.

== Winners, runners-up and nominees ==
=== Best Film ===
- La La Land
  - Runner-up (tie): Hell or High Water
  - Runner-up (tie): Manchester by the Sea
- Arrival
- Moonlight

=== Best Actor ===
- Casey Affleck - Manchester by the Sea
  - Runner-up: Joel Edgerton - Loving
- Ryan Gosling - La La Land
- Tom Hanks - Sully
- Viggo Mortensen - Captain Fantastic

=== Best Supporting Actor ===
- Mahershala Ali - Moonlight
  - Runner-up: Lucas Hedges - Manchester by the Sea
- Jeff Bridges - Hell or High Water
- Dev Patel - Lion
- Michael Shannon - Nocturnal Animals

=== Best Original Screenplay ===
- Hell or High Water - Taylor Sheridan
  - Runner-up: Manchester by the Sea - Kenneth Lonergan
- La La Land - Damien Chazelle
- Loving - Jeff Nichols
- Moonlight - Barry Jenkins

=== Best Cinematography ===
- La La Land - Linus Sandgren
  - Runner-up: Moonlight - James Laxton
- Arrival - Bradford Young
- Café Society - Vittorio Storaro
- Hail, Caesar! - Roger Deakins

=== Best Editing ===
- Jackie - Sebastián Sepúlveda
  - Runner-up (tie): Hacksaw Ridge - John Gilbert
  - Runner-up (tie): La La Land - Tom Cross
- Moonlight - Joi McMillon and Nat Sanders
- Nocturnal Animals - Joan Sobel

=== Best Production Design ===
- The Handmaiden - Seong-hee Ryu
  - Runner-up (tie): Fantastic Beasts and Where to Find Them - Stuart Craig and James Hambidge
  - Runner-up (tie): Jackie - Jean Rabasse
  - Runner-up (tie): La La Land - David Wasco
- Hail, Caesar! - Jess Gonchor

=== Best Horror / Science-Fiction Film ===
- The Witch
  - Runner-up: Arrival
- 10 Cloverfield Lane
- Doctor Strange
- Don't Breathe

=== Best Foreign Language Film ===
- Elle
  - Runner-up: The Handmaiden
- A Man Called Ove
- Our Little Sister
- Toni Erdmann

=== Best Animated Feature ===
- Zootopia
  - Runner-up: Kubo and the Two Strings
- April and the Extraordinary World
- Finding Dory
- Moana

=== Best Scene ===
- La La Land - Opening dance number, "Another Day of Sun."
  - Runner-up: Hail, Caesar! - "Would that it were so simple."
- Captain America: Civil War - Battle at the Leipzig/Halle Airport.
- Deadpool - Opening credits.
- Manchester by the Sea - Lee (Casey Affleck) and Randi (Michelle Williams) meet on the street.

=== Best Director ===
- Damien Chazelle - La La Land
  - Runner-up (tie): Kenneth Lonergan - Manchester by the Sea
  - Runner-up (tie): Denis Villeneuve - Arrival
- Barry Jenkins - Moonlight
- David Mackenzie - Hell or High Water

=== Best Actress ===
- Isabelle Huppert - Elle
  - Runner-up: Natalie Portman - Jackie
- Amy Adams - Arrival
- Ruth Negga - Loving
- Emma Stone - La La Land

=== Best Supporting Actress ===
- Viola Davis - Fences
  - Runner-up: Michelle Williams - Manchester by the Sea
- Lily Gladstone - Certain Women
- Greta Gerwig - 20th Century Women
- Naomie Harris - Moonlight

=== Best Adapted Screenplay ===
- Love & Friendship - Whit Stillman (Screenplay); Jane Austen (Novel)
  - Runner-up: Arrival - Eric Heisserer (Screenplay); Ted Chiang (Short Story)
- Fences - August Wilson (Screenplay and Play)
- Lion - Luke Davies (Screenplay); Saroo Brierley with Larry Buttrose (Book)
- Nocturnal Animals - Tom Ford (Screenplay); Austin Wright (Novel)

=== Best Visual Effects ===
- The Jungle Book
  - Runner-up: Doctor Strange
- Arrival
- La La Land
- A Monster Calls

=== Best Music Score ===
- La La Land - Justin Hurwitz
  - Runner-up: Jackie - Mica Levi
- Arrival - Jóhann Jóhannsson
- Moonlight - Nicholas Britell
- The Neon Demon - Cliff Martinez

=== Best Soundtrack ===
- Sing Street
  - Runner-up: La La Land
- Everybody Wants Some!!
- Moana
- Trolls

=== Best Song ===
- "Audition (The Fools Who Dream)" - La La Land
  - Runner-up: "City of Stars" - La La Land
- "How Far I'll Go" - Moana
- "You're Welcome" - Moana
- "Drive It Like You Stole It" - Sing Street

=== Best Documentary Feature ===
- I Am Not Your Negro
  - Runner-up: Weiner
- De Palma
- The Eagle Huntress
- Gleason

=== Best Comedy ===
- Hail, Caesar!
  - Runner-up: Popstar: Never Stop Never Stopping
- Deadpool
- Don't Think Twice
- Florence Foster Jenkins

=== Best Action Film ===
- Captain America: Civil War
  - Runner-up: Doctor Strange
- Deadpool
- Hacksaw Ridge
- Jason Bourne

== Multiple nominations and awards ==
These films had multiple nominations:

- 14 nominations: La La Land
- 8 nominations: Arrival, Moonlight
- 7 nominations: Manchester by the Sea
- 4 nominations: Hell or High Water, Jackie
- 3 nominations: Deadpool, Doctor Strange, Loving
- 2 nominations: Lion
