= A Christmas Story: The Musical =

American stage musical by Benj Pasek and Justin Paul

A Christmas Story
- The Musical
- Music: Benj Pasek; Justin Paul
- Lyrics: Benj Pasek; Justin Paul
- Book: Joseph Robinette
- Basis: A Christmas Story by; Jean Shepherd; Leigh Brown; Bob Clark; In God We Trust: All Others Pay Cash by Jean Shepherd
- Productions: 2009 Kansas City; 2010 Seattle; 2011 National tour 2012 Broadway; 2013-2021 National tours 2017 Live television

A Christmas Story: The Musical is a stage musical with music and lyrics written by Benj Pasek and Justin Paul, and a book by Joseph Robinette. It is based on the 1983 film A Christmas Story, itself based on the 1966 book In God We Trust: All Others Pay Cash by Jean Shepherd. The musical takes place in the 1940s in Indiana and focuses on a child named Ralphie, who wants a Red Ryder BB Gun for Christmas.

After numerous regional productions, out of town tryouts and national tours, this version of the musical originally officially opened on Broadway in November 19, 2012 at the Lunt Fontanne Theatre for a limited engagement that ran through December 30, 2012.

== Production history ==
The musical premiered at the Kansas City Repertory Theatre, Missouri, in December 2009. The music and lyrics for that version were written by Scott Davenport Richards; the musical was directed by Eric Rosen with the book by Joseph Robinette, and featured John Bolton as "The Old Man" and Anne L. Nathan as Mother. Zachary Sayle appeared as Ralphie Parker and Jake Siegfried as younger brother, Randy Parker. Benj Pasek and Justin Paul were hired to re-do the score after the Kansas City engagement.

A Christmas Story: The Musical opened at the 5th Avenue Theatre, Seattle, Washington, on December 9, 2010, and ran through December 30. The director was Eric Rosen with choreography by Kelly Devine, and a cast that featured John Bolton and Anne Allgood as The Old Man and Mother. A national tour in 2011 followed, ending at the Chicago Theatre.

=== New York City ===
The musical had a limited run in Manhattan in 2012 and 2013. It opened on Broadway at the Lunt-Fontanne Theatre on November 19, 2012 (after previews beginning November 7), and closed on December 30. The musical was directed by John Rando with choreography by Warren Carlyle. The cast featured Dan Lauria as Jean Shepherd, John Bolton as The Old Man, Caroline O'Connor as Miss Shields, Erin Dilly as Mother, Zac Ballard as Randy, and with Johnny Rabe and Joe West both alternating as lead character Ralphie, who had been played in the 1983 film by Peter Billingsley, one of the show's producers. The Broadway producers were Gerald Goehring, Roy Miller, Michael F. Mitri, Pat Flicker Addiss, Peter Billingsley, Timothy Laczynski, Mariano Tolentino, Jr., Louise H. Beard, Michael Filerman, Scott Hart, Alison Eckert, Bob Bartner, Michael Jenkins, Angela Milonas and Bradford W. Smith. Jean Shepherd's estate had specifically requested that Billingsley produce the musical as a means of maintaining creative ties to the original film; Billingsley had taken a guarded approach to involvement in later productions in the franchise, later remarking that he had vetoed and turned down several "bad ideas" for sequels. The production was represented by long-time Broadway press agency, Keith Sherman & Associates

The production returned to New York for a limited engagement at The Theater at Madison Square Garden that ran from December 11-29, 2013. The principals included Dan Lauria, John Bolton, Erin Dilly and Caroline O'Conner reprising their roles. The character of "Ralphie" was played by Jake Lucas with Eli Tokash at some performances. The role of 'Randy' was played by Noah Baird.

=== National tour ===
A seasonal national tour of the show began in 2014. Directed by Matt Lenz, the tour is based on the original staging by John Rando with choreography by Warren Carlyle. Sets are by Michael Carnahan, lighting design by Charlie Morrison and costumes by Lisa Zinni. The 2019 tour began in November in Sacramento, California at the Memorial Auditorium. The tour production is again directed by Matt Lenz, staged by Michael Rader with Warren Carlyle's Broadway choreography reset for the tour by Brooke Martino. In the 2021 national tour, Keegan Gulledge and Blake Burnham alternated in the role of Ralphie. The tour relaunched in 2025 with 40 performances in 12 cities. The all new cast included Torben Mularski and McCager Carver on select performances as Ralphie Parker, Mark Stoddard as Jean Shepherd, Kirsten Bleu Kaiser as Mother, Gregory White as The Old Man, and Mason Burnham as Randy.

=== 2017 television broadcast ===
Fox Broadcasting Company aired a live television event based on the Broadway musical version titled A Christmas Story Live!, with Pasek and Paul composing several new songs for the live television musical. The live musical was televised on December 17, 2017, with the cast that starred Maya Rudolph as Ralphie's mother, Matthew Broderick as The Narrator/Older Ralphie, 11-year-old Andy Walken as Ralphie, Jane Krakowski as Miss Shields, Chris Diamantopoulos as Ralphie's father, and Ana Gasteyer as Mrs. Schwartz, the mother of one of Ralphie's friends. The production added several new songs and cut three of the songs from the original Broadway production.

=== Regional productions ===
The musical has had several regional productions, including the more recent productions running at the Walnut Street Theatre in Philadelphia and at the Paper Mill Playhouse in Millburn, New Jersey, both productions running from November 2015 through January 2016.

The 5th Avenue Theatre in Seattle had once served as a regional venue for the musical, hosting it from November to December 2014. Additionally, the musical ran during the 2013 season in at the Wang Theatre in Boston, the Woodlawn Theatre in San Antonio, Texas and the Bushnell Theatre in Hartford, Connecticut.

=== International productions ===
A Christmas Story premiered in Europe at Waterloo East Theatre London SE1 8TG on November 28, 2018.

== Synopsis ==
Act 1

After passing a Salvation Army Santa Claus, radio disc jockey Jean Shepherd tells his audience that it reminds him of a highly important Christmas from his childhood in Indiana, told through the eyes of young Ralphie Parker. In December 1940, Ralphie plans to convince his parents to get him his dream present ("It All Comes Down To Christmas"). The family goes to Higbees department store where, in the window, Ralphie sees the present in person, a "Red Ryder Carbine Action BB Gun".

The next day, while Ralphie's father struggles with his entry in a crossword puzzle contest ("Genius On Cleveland Street"), Ralphie accidentally blurts out what he wants, which his mother promptly shuts down with the classic excuse "You'll shoot your eye out". On the way to school, Ralphie, his brother Randy and his friends are accosted by bully Scut Farkus and his toady Grover Dill ("When You're A Wimp").

In class, Ralphie's teacher, Ms. Shields, assigns a theme on what the class wants for Christmas. This makes Ralphie think he can use his theme to get Ms. Shields to talk his parents into getting the gun for him ("Ralphie To The Rescue"), but he starts to lose heart as the weeks pass without the paper being graded.

One night during dinner ("That's What A Mother Does"), Mr. Parker is informed by telegram that he's won an award in the contest. Soon after, the award arrives: a lamp shaped like a woman's leg. Despite Mrs. Parker's clear disgust, Mr. Parker puts it in the front window for all to see ("A Major Award").

While going to get a tree, the family car gets a flat. Ralphie helps his father change the tire by carrying a hubcap full of the tire's bolts. When it's accidentally knocked out of his hands, he seemingly says, "Oh fudge", though Shepherd clarifies he actually said "the F--- word". He gets in huge trouble for this, and though he claims he heard it from his friend Schwartz - he really heard it from his father - which in turn gets Schwartz in trouble with his mom, he becomes worried that this incident will doom his Christmas ("Act 1 Finale").

Act 2

Determined to save his Christmas, Ralphie tries to behave the rest of the month, but this is jeopardized on the last day before winter break when Schwartz "triple dog dares" their friend Flick to stick his tongue to a pole to see if it will stick ("Sticky Situation"). It does, and though no one is caught, the fire department is called to free him. Worse, when the themes are finally returned, Ralphie only gets a C+ instead of the expected A and a note repeating the dreaded phrase ("You'll Shoot Your Eye Out").

On the way home, Ralphie is again accosted by Scut and Grover. Finally snapping, he attacks them in a blind rage, spewing curses all the while. His mother eventually pulls him off and takes him home, and though he's frightened of what will happen, she reassures him and lets the matter drop ("Just Like That").

Still with no way to get the gun, Ralphie next tries the Santa working "At Higbees". This is also a failure, as he's once again told, "You'll shoot your eye out" ("Up On Santa's Lap"). On Christmas Eve, Mrs. Parker "accidentally" breaks the lamp, leading to a big argument with her husband, though they soon make up ("Before The Old Man Comes Home"). That night, all the kids struggle to sleep as they anticipate the coming morning ("Somewhere Hovering Over Indiana").

On Christmas morning, the family receives gifts of varying quality, including a humiliating pair of pink bunny pajamas for Ralphie. At the last moment, Mr. Parker reveals he got Ralphie the gun, but when he goes outside, the first shot ricochets and hits his glasses, breaking them. Luckily, he makes up a story about a fallen icicle and his mother doesn't learn the truth.

When the neighbor's dogs eat the family's Christmas turkey, they go to a Chinese restaurant for dinner. Despite the setbacks, they and other families have a great Christmas, and that night, Ralphie falls asleep with his cherished gun in his arms ("A Christmas Story").

== Casts ==
Character	1st US tour	Broadway	2nd US tour	Live broadcast
Character	2011	2012	2014	2017
Ralphie Parker	Clarke Hallum	Johnny Rabe Joe West	Evan Gray Colton Maurer	Andy Walken
Randy Parker	Matthew Lewis	Zac Ballard	Cal Alexander	Tyler Wladis
Jean Shepherd	Gene Weygandt	Dan Lauria	Max Thayer	Matthew Broderick (as Ralphie as an adult)
Mother	Rachel Bay Jones	Erin Dilly	Susannah Jones	Maya Rudolph
The Old Man	John Bolton	John Bolton	Christopher Swan	Chris Diamantopoulos
Miss Shields	Karen Mason	Caroline O'Connor	Avital Asuleen	Jane Krakowski
Schwartz	Jake Bennett Siegfried	J.D. Rodriguez	Seth Black-Diamond	Sammy Ramirez
Flick	Nicholas Daniel Gonzalez	Jeremy Shinder		JJ Batteast
Scut Farkus	Charlie Plummer	Jack Mastrianni		Sacha Carlson
Grover Dill	John Francis Babbo	John Francis Babbo		
Santa	Adam Pelty	Eddie Korbich	Adam Pelty	David Alan Grier
Mrs. Schwartz	Kirsten Wyatt	Kirsten Wyatt		Ana Gasteyer
Restaurant Waiter	Andrew Cristi	Andrew Cristi		Ken Jeong
Elves at Higbee's	Andrew Cristi; Kirsten Wyatt	Andrew Cristi; Kirsten Wyatt		Fred Armisen

== Characters ==
- Ralphie Parker: A little boy who wants a Red Ryder Carbine Action Range Model Air Rifle with a compass in the stock and a thing that tells time.
- Jean Shepherd: Old Ralphie who narrates the story.
- The Old Man: The gruff father of Ralphie and Randy.
- Mother: The glue who holds the Parker family together.
- Randy: Ralphie's kid brother.
- Miss Shields: Ralphie's teacher.
- Schwartz: Ralphie's foul mouthed friend; his family is Jewish in A Christmas Story Live!.
- Flick: Ralphie's dim friend who gets his tongue stuck to a flag pole.
- Scut Farkus: The class bully who gets beaten up by Ralphie.
- Grover Dill: Scut's right-hand man.
- Esther Jane: Ralphie's love interest.
- Mary Beth: Esther Jane and Nancy's Best friend.
- Nancy: Esther Jane and Mary Beth's best friend.

== Musical numbers ==
Act 1

- "Overture" - Orchestra
- "It All Comes Down to Christmas"^- Ralphie, the Parkers, and Ensemble.
- "Red Ryder Carbine Action BB Gun" - Ralphie and Jean
- "It All Comes Down to Christmas (Reprise)" - Ralphie and Company
- "The Genius on Cleveland Street" - The Old Man and Mother
- "When You're a Wimp" - Kids
- "Ralphie to the Rescue!" - Ralphie, Miss Shields, the Old Man, Mother, Randy, and Ensemble
- "What a Mother Does" - Mother
- "A Major Award" - The Old Man, Mother, and Neighbors
- "Parker Family Singalong" - The Parkers
- "Act One Finale" - Ralphie and Ensemble

Act 2

- "Entr'acte" - Orchestra
- "Sticky Situation" - Ralphie, Flick, Schwartz, Kids, Miss Shields, Nurse, Flick's Mom, Fireman, Policeman, and Doctor
- "You'll Shoot Your Eye Out" - Miss Shields and Kids
- "Just Like That" - Mother
- "At Higbee's" - Elves
- "Up on Santa's Lap" - Santa, Elves, Ralphie, Randy, and Kids
- "Before the Old Man Comes Home" - The Parkers
- "Somewhere Hovering Over Indiana" - Ralphie, Randy, and Kids
- "Ralphie to the Rescue! (Reprise)" - Ralphie and Ensemble
- "A Christmas Story" - The Parkers and Full Company

In the Broadway soundtrack, songs may be different.

== Critical reception ==
The reviewer of the Seattle production wrote:

Just about every nostalgic, humorous vignette, celebrating a kind of quirky childhood innocence enshrined in America's past, gets an up-tempo romp in the polished, very busy score.... performed with vigor by an admirable cast of 33.... But overall, A Christmas Story looks spiffy, with Walt Spangler's snow-cave design brightened by giant Christmas packages and trees and Howell Binkley's twinkly-tastic lighting. If it's too long a haul, there's a lot here to please kids.

Charles Isherwood, in his review of the Broadway production for The New York Times, wrote:

[T]he stage version lightens up a little on the cute, smart-alecky asides... making room for the music and allowing the story mostly to speak for itself.... Mr. Pasek and Mr. Paul have provided a likable, perky score that duly translates all of the major episodes in the story into appropriate musical numbers.

== Nominated awards ==
The production received two Outer Critics Circle Award nominations but did not win: Outstanding New Broadway Musical and Outstanding Featured Actor in a Musical (Lauria).

The musical received six Drama Desk Award nominations (58th Drama Desk Awards), as well as three Tony Award nominations (Best Musical, Best Book of a Musical, and Best Original Score (Music and/or Lyrics) Written for the Theatre) for the 67th Tony Awards, but did not win any.

=== Original Broadway production ===
Year	Award	Category	Nominee	Result
2013	Outer Critics Circle Award	Outstanding New Broadway Musical		Nominated
2013	Outer Critics Circle Award	Outstanding Featured Actor in a Musical	Dan Lauria	Nominated
2013	Drama Desk Award	Outstanding Musical		Nominated
2013	Drama Desk Award	Outstanding Featured Actor in a Musical	John Bolton	Nominated
2013	Drama Desk Award	Outstanding Choreography	Warren Carlyle	Nominated
2013	Drama Desk Award	Outstanding Music	Pasek & Paul	Nominated
2013	Drama Desk Award	Outstanding Book of a Musical	Joseph Robinette	Nominated
2013	Drama Desk Award	Outstanding Orchestrations	Larry Blank	Nominated
2013	Tony Award (67th)	Best Musical		Nominated
2013	Tony Award (67th)	Best Book of a Musical	Joseph Robinette	Nominated
2013	Tony Award (67th)	Best Original Score	Pasek & Paul	Nominated
