= Critics' Choice Movie Award for Best Song =

Award given by the Broadcast Film Critics Association

- Awarded for: Superior achievement in motion picture songs
- Sponsored by: Broadcast Film Critics Association
- Date: Annually

The Critics' Choice Movie Award for Best Song is one of the awards given to people working in the motion picture industry by the Broadcast Film Critics Association.

The award notably recognizes not only songwriters but also performers as recipients, while only the first are recognized by most award ceremonies; from 2025 onward, performers were no longer recipients.

== Winners and nominees ==
=== 1990s ===
Year	Song title	Film	Recipients
1998 4th	"When You Believe"	The Prince of Egypt	Written by Stephen Schwartz; Performed by Sally Dworsky & Michelle Pfeiffer
1999 5th	"Music of My Heart"	Music of the Heart	Written by Diane Warren; Performed by Gloria Estefan & NSYNC

=== 2000s ===
Year	Song title	Film	Recipients
2000 6th	"My Funny Friend and Me"	The Emperor's New Groove	Written by David Hartley & Sting; Performed by Sting
2001 7th	"May It Be" (TIE)	The Lord of the Rings: The Fellowship of the Ring	Written by Enya, Nicky & Roma Ryan; Performed by Enya
2001 7th	"Vanilla Sky" (TIE)	Vanilla Sky	Written and Performed by Paul McCartney
2001 7th	"There You'll Be"	Pearl Harbor	Written by Diane Warren; Performed by Faith Hill
2001 7th	"Until"	Kate & Leopold	Written and Performed by Sting
2002 8th	"Lose Yourself"	8 Mile	Written by Jeff Bass, Eminem & Luis Resto; Performed by Eminem
2002 8th	"Father and Daughter"	The Wild Thornberrys Movie	Written and Performed by Paul Simon
2002 8th	"Hero"	Spider-Man	Written and Performed by Chad Kroeger & Josey Scott
2003 9th	"A Mighty Wind"	A Mighty Wind	Written by Christopher Guest, Eugene Levy & Michael McKean; Performed by the cast of A Mighty Wind
2003 9th	"The Heart of Every Girl"	Mona Lisa Smile	Written and Performed by Elton John
2003 9th	"Man of the Hour"	Big Fish	Written by Eddie Vedder; Performed by Pearl Jam
2003 9th	"School of Rock"	School of Rock	Written by Sammy James & Mike White; Performed by the cast of School of Rock
2003 9th	"Time Enough for Tears"	In America	Written by Bono, Gavin Friday & Maurice Seezer; Performed by Andrea Corr
2004 10th	"Old Habits Die Hard"	Alfie	Written by Mick Jagger & Dave Stewart; Performed by Jagger
2004 10th	"Accidentally in Love"	Shrek 2	Written and Performed by Counting Crows
2004 10th	"Believe"	The Polar Express	Written by Glen Ballard & Alan Silvestri; Performed by Josh Groban
2005 11th	"Hustle & Flow"	Hustle & Flow	Written and Performed by Terrence Howard
2005 11th	"A Love That Will Never Grow Old"	Brokeback Mountain	Written by Gustavo Santaolalla & Bernie Taupin; Performed by Emmylou Harris
2005 11th	"Same in Any Language"	Elizabethtown	Written by Nancy Wilson & Cameron Crowe; Performed by My Morning Jacket & I Nine
2005 11th	"Seasons of Love"	Rent	Written by Jonathan Larson; Performed by the cast of Rent
2005 11th	"Travelin' Thru"	Transamerica	Written and Performed by Dolly Parton
2006 12th	"Listen"	Dreamgirls	Written by Scott Cutler, Henry Krieger & Anne Preven; Performed by Beyoncé
2006 12th	"I Need to Wake Up"	An Inconvenient Truth	Written and Performed by Melissa Etheridge
2006 12th	"My Little Girl"	Flicka	Written by Tom Douglas & Tim McGraw; Performed by McGraw
2006 12th	"The Neighbor"	Dixie Chicks: Shut Up and Sing	Written and Performed by Dixie Chicks
2006 12th	"Never Gonna Break My Faith"	Bobby	Written by Bryan Adams; Performed by Mary J. Blige, Aretha Franklin & Boys Choir of Harlem
2006 12th	"Ordinary Miracle"	Charlotte's Web	Written and Performed by Sarah McLachlan
2007 13th	"Falling Slowly"	Once	Written and Performed by Glen Hansard & Markéta Irglová
2007 13th	"Come So Far (So Far to Go)"	Hairspray	Written by Marc Shaiman & Scott Wittman; Performed by Nikki Blonsky, Zac Efron, Elijah Kelley & Queen Latifah
2007 13th	"Do You Feel Me"	American Gangster	Written and Performed by Anthony Hamilton
2007 13th	"Guaranteed"	Into the Wild	Written and Performed by Eddie Vedder
2007 13th	"That's How You Know"	Enchanted	Written by Alan Menken & Stephen Schwartz; Performed by Amy Adams
2008 14th	"The Wrestler"	The Wrestler	Written and Performed by Bruce Springsteen
2008 14th	"Another Way to Die"	Quantum of Solace	Written by Jack White; Performed by Alicia Keys & White
2008 14th	"Down to Earth"	WALL-E	Written by Peter Gabriel & Thomas Newman; Performed by Gabriel
2008 14th	"I Thought I Lost You"	Bolt	Written by Miley Cyrus & Jeffrey Steele; Performed by Cyrus & John Travolta
2008 14th	"Jai Ho"	Slumdog Millionaire	Written by Gulzar & A. R. Rahman; Performed by Vijay Prakash, Sukhvinder Singh, Mahalaxmi Iyer & Tanvi Shah
2009 15th	"The Weary Kind"	Crazy Heart	Written by Ryan Bingham & T Bone Burnett; Performed by Birgham
2009 15th	"All Is Love"	Where the Wild Things Are	Written by Karen O & Nick Zinner; Performed by O
2009 15th	"Almost There"	The Princess and the Frog	Written by Randy Newman; Performed by Anika Noni Rose
2009 15th	"Cinema Italiano"	Nine	Written by Maury Yeston; Performed by Kate Hudson
2009 15th	"(I Want to) Come Home"	Everybody's Fine	Written and Performed by Paul McCartney

=== 2010s ===
Year	Song title	Film	Recipients
2010 16th	"If I Rise"	127 Hours	Written by Rollo Armstrong, Dido & A. R. Rahman; Performed by Dido & Rahman
2010 16th	"I See the Light"	Tangled	Written by Alan Menken & Glenn Slater; Performed by Mandy Moore & Zachary Levi
2010 16th	"Shine"	Waiting for "Superman"	Written and Performed by John Legend
2010 16th	"We Belong Together"	Toy Story 3	Written and Performed by Randy Newman
2010 16th	"You Haven't Seen the Last of Me"	Burlesque	Written by Diane Warren; Performed by Cher
2011 17th	"Life's a Happy Song"	The Muppets	Written by Bret McKenzie; Performed by Amy Adams, Jason Segel & Walter
2011 17th	"Hello Hello"	Gnomeo & Juliet	Written by Elton John & Bernie Taupin; Performed by Lady Gaga & John
2011 17th	"The Living Proof"	The Help	Written by Mary J. Blige, Harvey Mason Jr., Thomas Newman & Damon Thomas; Performed by Blige
2011 17th	"Man or Muppet"	The Muppets	Written by Bret McKenzie; Performed by Jason Segel & Walter
2011 17th	"Pictures in My Head"	The Muppets	Written by Aris Archontis, Jeannie Lurie & Chen Neeman; Performed by Kermit the Frog & The Muppets
2012 18th	"Skyfall"	Skyfall	Written by Adele & Paul Epworth; Performed by Adele
2012 18th	"For You"	Act of Valor	Written by Keith Urban & Monty Powell; Performed by Urban
2012 18th	"Learn Me Right"	Brave	Written by Mumford & Sons; Performed by Birdy & Mumford & Sons
2012 18th	"Still Alive"	Paul Williams Still Alive	Written and Performed by Paul Williams
2012 18th	"Suddenly"	Les Misérables	Written by Alain Boublil, Herbert Kretzmer & Claude-Michel Schönberg; Performed by Hugh Jackman
2013 19th	"Let It Go"	Frozen	Written by Kristen Anderson-Lopez & Robert Lopez; Performed by Idina Menzel
2013 19th	"Atlas"	The Hunger Games: Catching Fire	Written and Performed by Coldplay
2013 19th	"Happy"	Despicable Me 2	Written and Performed by Pharrell Williams
2013 19th	"Ordinary Love"	Mandela: Long Walk to Freedom	Written and Performed by U2
2013 19th	"Please Mr. Kennedy"	Inside Llewyn Davis	Written by T Bone Burnett, Coen Brothers, George Cromarty, Ed Rush & Justin Timberlake; Performed by Adam Driver, Oscar Isaac & Timberlake
2013 19th	"Young and Beautiful"	The Great Gatsby	Written and Performed by Lana Del Rey
2014 20th	"Glory"	Selma	Written and Performed by Common & John Legend
2014 20th	"Big Eyes"	Big Eyes	Written and Performed by Lana Del Rey
2014 20th	"Everything Is Awesome"	The Lego Movie	Written by The Lonely Island, Jo Li & Shawn Patterson; Performed by The Lonely Island & Tegan and Sara
2014 20th	"Lost Stars"	Begin Again	Written by Gregg Alexander, Danielle Brisebois, Nick Lashley & Nick Southwood; Performed by Keira Knightley & Adam Levine
2014 20th	"Yellow Flicker Beat"	The Hunger Games: Mockingjay – Part 1	Written by Lorde & Joel Little; Performed by Lorde
2015 21st	"See You Again"	Furious 7	Written by Wiz Khalifa, Charlie Puth, Andrew Cedar & DJ Frank E; Performed by Khalifa & Puth
2015 21st	"Love Me like You Do"	Fifty Shades of Grey	Written by Ilya, Savan Kotecha, Tove Lo, Max Martin & Ali Payami; Performed by Ellie Goulding
2015 21st	"One Kind of Love"	Love & Mercy	Written by Brian Wilson & Scott Bennett; Performed by Wilson
2015 21st	"Simple Song #3"	Youth	Written by David Lang; Performed by Sumi Jo
2015 21st	"Til It Happens to You"	The Hunting Ground	Written by Lady Gaga & Diane Warren; Performed by Gaga
2015 21st	"Writing's on the Wall"	Spectre	Written by Sam Smith & Jimmy Napes; Performed by Smith
2016 22nd	"City of Stars"	La La Land	Written by Justin Hurwitz & Pasek & Paul; Performed by Ryan Gosling & Emma Stone
2016 22nd	"Can't Stop the Feeling!"	Trolls	Written by Max Martin, Shellback & Justin Timberlake; Performed by the cast of Trolls
2016 22nd	"Audition"	La La Land	Written by Justin Hurwitz & Pasek & Paul; Performed by Emma Stone
2016 22nd	"Drive It Like You Stole It"	Sing Street	Written by Gary Clark; Performed by Ferdia Walsh-Peelo
2016 22nd	"How Far I'll Go"	Moana	Written by Lin-Manuel Miranda; Performed by Auliʻi Cravalho
2016 22nd	"The Rules Don't Apply"	Rules Don't Apply	Written by Eddie Arkin & Lorraine Feather; Performed by Lily Collins
2017 23rd	"Remember Me"	Coco	Written by Kristen Anderson-Lopez & Robert Lopez; Performed by Benjamin Bratt
2017 23rd	"Evermore"	Beauty and the Beast	Written by Alan Menken & Tim Rice; Performed by Dan Stevens
2017 23rd	"Mystery of Love"	Call Me by Your Name	Written and Performed by Sufjan Stevens
2017 23rd	"Stand Up for Something"	Marshall	Written by Common & Diane Warren; Performed by Common & Andra Day
2017 23rd	"This Is Me"	The Greatest Showman	Written by Pasek & Paul; Performed by Keala Settle
2018 24th	"Shallow"	A Star Is Born	Written by Lady Gaga, Mark Ronson, Anthony Rossomando & Andrew Wyatt; Performed by Bradley Cooper & Gaga
2018 24th	"All the Stars"	Black Panther	Written by Top Dawg, Kendrick Lamar, Al Shux, Sounwave & SZA; Performed by Lamar & SZA
2018 24th	"Girl in the Movies"	Dumplin'	Written by Dolly Parton & Linda Perry; Performed by Parton
2018 24th	"I'll Fight"	RBG	Written by Diane Warren; Performed by Jennifer Hudson
2018 24th	"The Place Where Lost Things Go"	Mary Poppins Returns	Written by Marc Shaiman & Scott Wittman; Performed by Emily Blunt
2018 24th	"Trip a Little Light Fantastic"	Mary Poppins Returns	Written by Marc Shaiman & Scott Wittman; Performed by Emily Blunt, Pixie Davies, Joel Dawson, Tarik Frimpong, Lin-Manuel Miranda & Nathaniel Selah
2019 25th	"Glasgow (No Place Like Home)" (TIE)	Wild Rose	Written by Mary Steenburgen; Performed by Jessie Buckley
2019 25th	"(I'm Gonna) Love Me Again" (TIE)	Rocketman	Written by Elton John & Bernie Taupin; Performed by Taron Egerton & John
2019 25th	"I'm Standing With You"	Breakthrough	Written by Diane Warren; Performed by Chrissy Metz
2019 25th	"Into the Unknown"	Frozen 2	Written by Kristen Anderson-Lopez & Robert Lopez; Performed by Idina Menzel
2019 25th	"Speechless"	Aladdin	Written by Alan Menken & Pasek & Paul; Performed by Naomi Scott
2019 25th	"Spirit"	The Lion King	Written by Beyoncé, Ilya & Labrinth; Performed by Beyoncé
2019 25th	"Stand Up"	Harriet	Written by Cynthia Erivo & Joshuah Brian Campbell; Performed by Erivo

=== 2020s ===
Year	Song title	Film	Recipients
2020 26th	"Speak Now"	One Night in Miami...	Written by Sam Ashworth & Leslie Odom Jr.; Performed by Odom Jr.
2020 26th	"Everybody Cries"	The Outpost	Written by Larry Groupé, Rod Lurie & Rita Wilson; Performed by Wilson
2020 26th	"Fight for You"	Judas and the Black Messiah	Written by D'Mile, H.E.R. & Tiara Thomas; Performed by H.E.R.
2020 26th	"Húsavík"	Eurovision Song Contest: The Story of Fire Saga	Written by Fat Gus Max, Rickard Göransson & Savan Kotecha; Performed by Will Ferrell & My Marianne
2020 26th	"lo sì"	The Life Ahead	Written by Niccolò Agliardi, Laura Pausini & Diane Warren; Performed by Pausini
2020 26th	"Tigress & Tweed"	The United States vs. Billie Holiday	Written by Raphael Saadiq & Andra Day; Performed by Day
2021 27th	"No Time to Die"	No Time to Die	Written by Billie Eilish & Finneas O'Connell; Performed by Eilish
2021 27th	"Be Alive"	King Richard	Written by Beyoncé & DIXSON; Performed by Beyoncé
2021 27th	"Dos Oruguitas"	Encanto	Written by Lin-Manuel Miranda; Performed by Sebastián Yatra
2021 27th	"Guns Go Bang"	The Harder They Fall	Written by Jeymes Samuel, Kid Cudi & Jay-Z; Performed by Cudi & Jay-Z.
2021 27th	"Just Look Up"	Don't Look Up	Written by Ariana Grande, Taura Stinson, Kid Cudi & Nicholas Britell; Performed by Grande & Cudi
2022 28th	"Naatu Naatu"	RRR	Written by M. M. Keeravani & Chandrabose; Performed by Rahul Sipligunj & Kaala Bhairava
2022 28th	"Carolina"	Where the Crawdads Sing	Written and Performed by Taylor Swift
2022 28th	"Ciao Papa"	Guillermo del Toro's Pinocchio	Written by Alexandre Desplat, Roeban Katz & Guillermo del Toro; Performed by Gregory Mann
2022 28th	"Hold My Hand"	Top Gun: Maverick	Written by Lady Gaga & BloodPop; Performed by Gaga
2022 28th	"Lift Me Up"	Black Panther: Wakanda Forever	Written by Ludwig Göransson, Rihanna, Ryan Coogler & Tems; Performed by Rihanna
2022 28th	"New Body Rhumba"	White Noise	Written by Pat Mahoney, James Murphy & Nancy Whang; Performed by LCD Soundsystem
2023 29th	"I'm Just Ken"	Barbie	Written by Mark Ronson & Andrew Wyatt; Performed by Ryan Gosling
2023 29th	"Dance the Night"	Barbie	Written by Caroline Ailen, Dua Lipa Mark Ronson & Andrew Wyatt; Performed by Lipa
2023 29th	"Peaches"	The Super Mario Bros. Movie	Written by Jack Black, Aaron Horvath, Michael Jelenic, Eric Osmond & John Spiker; Performed by Black
2023 29th	"Road to Freedom"	Rustin	Written & Performed by Lenny Kravitz
2023 29th	"This Wish"	Wish	Written by Julia Michaels & Benjamin Rice; Performed by Ariana DeBose
2023 29th	"What Was I Made For?"	Barbie	Written by Billie Eilish & Finneas O'Connell; Performed by Eilish
2024 30th	"El Mal"	Emilia Pérez	Written by Clément Ducol, Camille & Jacques Audiard; Performed by Zoe Saldaña, Karla Sofía Gascón & Camille
2024 30th	"Beautiful That Way"	The Last Showgirl	Written by Andrew Wyatt, Miley Cyrus & Lykke Li; Performed by Cyrus
2024 30th	"Compress/ Repress"	Challengers	Written by Trent Reznor, Atticus Ross & Luca Guadagnino; Performed by Reznor & Ross
2024 30th	"Harper and Will Go West"	Will & Harper	Written by Sean Douglas, Josh Greenbaum & Kristen Wiig; Performed by Wiig
2024 30th	"Kiss the Sky"	The Wild Robot	Written by Delacey, Jordan K. Johnson, Stefan Johnson, Maren Morris, Michael Pollack & Ali Tamposi; Performed by Morris
2024 30th	"Mi Camino"	Emilia Pérez	Written by Clément Ducol & Camille; Performed by Selena Gomez
2025 31st
2025 31st	"Golden"	KPop Demon Hunters	Written by Ejae, Mark Sonnenblick, Ido, 24, and Teddy
2025 31st	"Clothed by the Sun"	The Testament of Ann Lee	Written by Daniel Blumberg
2025 31st	"Drive"	F1	Written by Ed Sheeran, John Mayer, and Blake Slatkin
2025 31st	"The Girl in the Bubble"	Wicked: For Good	Written by Stephen Schwartz
2025 31st	"I Lied to You"	Sinners	Written by Raphael Saadiq and Ludwig Göransson
2025 31st	"Train Dreams"	Train Dreams	Written by Nick Cave and Bryce Dessner

== See also ==
- Academy Award for Best Original Song
