= City of Stars =

2016 song by Ryan Gosling and Emma Stone

- Hollywood remix cover

Single by Ryan Gosling and Emma Stone

from the album La La Land: Original Motion Picture Soundtrack
- Released: March 3, 2017
- Recorded: 2016
- Genre: Show tunes; jazz pop
- Length: 2:25
- Label: Interscope
- Composer: Justin Hurwitz
- Lyricists: Benj Pasek; Justin Paul
- Producers: Justin Hurwitz; Marius de Vries

Music video
- "City of Stars" on YouTube

"City of Stars" is a song performed by Ryan Gosling and Emma Stone in the Damien Chazelle directed film La La Land (2016). The music of the song was composed by Justin Hurwitz while the lyrics were provided by Benj Pasek and Justin Paul. The song won numerous awards, including the award for Best Original Song at both the 74th Golden Globe Awards and 89th Academy Awards.

Another version of the song was also released as a 'Hollywood remix' but was not used in the original film. "City of Stars" was released as a single in Italy on March 3, 2017.

== Context ==
In the film, the song is first sung by Gosling alone as the character of Sebastian as he sings and dances on the Hermosa Beach Pier. Later in the film, it is reprised by Sebastian and Mia (Stone) during a montage of him getting ready to tour with Keith's (John Legend) band, as well as Mia quitting her job at a coffee shop and renting out a theater for her one-woman play.

== Inspiration ==
Justin Hurwitz, the composer of the song, discussed the writing of the song:

[The song] started at the piano with me just working on demos for Damien, sending him ideas until something really sparked. It's so funny that that and "Audition" are the two songs that people seem to be responding to the most, at least so far, because they had similar processes in the sense that they had probably the least amount of fussing at the piano demo stage. [...] I was just composing it from an emotional place and thinking about the tone. I would say the tone is hopeful, but melancholy at the same time. And it kind of goes back-and-forth between cadencing in major and cadencing in minor, because I think that’s kind of what the song is about. You have these great moments and then you have these less great moments in life and in Los Angeles and we see it happen in the story. I was thinking about that idea a little bit and just trying to compose a melody that I thought was shapely and beautiful. I guess it has some jazz inflections, because it’s something Sebastian plays on the piano.

== Music video ==
The music video was uploaded to Lionsgate Movies's YouTube channel on December 7th, 2016, and has gained more than 33 million views as of December 2025.

== Accolades ==
Accolades for "City of Stars"
Awards
Award	Date of ceremony	Category	Result	Ref.
Hollywood Music in Media Awards	November 17, 2016	Best Song – Feature Film	Won	
Critics' Choice Awards	December 11, 2016	Best Song	Won	
St. Louis Gateway Film Critics Association	December 18, 2016	Best Song	Won	
Houston Film Critics Society	January 6, 2017	Best Original Song	Won	
Golden Globe Awards	January 8, 2017	Best Original Song	Won	
Satellite Awards	February 19, 2017	Best Original Song	Won	
Academy Awards	February 26, 2017	Best Original Song	Won	
Grammy Award	January 28, 2018	Best Song Written for Visual Media	Nominated	

== Charts ==
=== Weekly charts ===
Weekly chart performance for "City of Stars"
Chart (2017)	Peak position
Austria (Ö3 Austria Top 40)	68
Belgium (Ultratop 50 Flanders)	30
Belgium (Ultratip Bubbling Under Wallonia)	20
Canada Hot 100 (Billboard)	89
France (SNEP)	44
Greece Digital Songs (Billboard)	3
Hong Kong (Metro Radio)	1
Hungary (Single Top 40)	8
Ireland (IRMA)	57
Italy (FIMI)	51
Japan Hot Overseas (Billboard)	2
Japan Radio Songs (Billboard)	1
Portugal (AFP)	45
Scottish Singles Sales (Official Charts)	29
Spain (Promusicae)	33
South Korea International Chart (Gaon)	2
Switzerland (Schweizer Hitparade)	48
UK Singles (Official Charts)	53
US Bubbling Under Hot 100 (Billboard)	8
US Digital Song Sales (Billboard)	45
US Jazz Digital Songs (Billboard): Solo version	1

=== Year-end charts ===
Year-end chart performance for "City of Stars"
Chart (2017)	Position
Hungary (Single Top 40)	72

== Certifications ==
Certifications for "City of Stars"
Region	Certification	Certified units/sales
Brazil (Pro-Música Brasil)	Gold	30,000^{‡}
France (SNEP)	Platinum	200,000^{‡}
Italy (FIMI)	Gold	25,000^{‡}
Spain (Promusicae)	Platinum	60,000^{‡}
United Kingdom (BPI)	Silver	200,000^{‡}
^{‡} Sales+streaming figures based on certification alone.

== See also ==
- La La Land (soundtrack)
- "Another Day of Sun"
- "Audition (The Fools Who Dream)"
