= Audition (The Fools Who Dream) =

2016 song by Emma Stone

Song by Emma Stone

from the album La La Land: Original Motion Picture Soundtrack
- Written: 2011–2014
- Released: December 9, 2016
- Length: 3:48
- Label: Interscope
- Composer: Justin Hurwitz
- Lyricists: Benj Pasek; Justin Paul
- Producers: Justin Hurwitz; Marius de Vries

Music video (film sequence)
- "Audition (The Fools Who Dream)" on YouTube

"Audition (The Fools Who Dream)" is a song composed by Justin Hurwitz with lyrics by Benj Pasek and Justin Paul for the musical film La La Land (2016). Sung by American actress Emma Stone in her role as Mia, the emotional ballad forms the film's climax. "Audition" sees Mia describing what it means to be someone who seeks a career in the arts; it has overall themes about dreamers and the importance of actors.

The final song he wrote for La La Land, Hurwitz began working on "Audition" in 2011. He revisited the track in 2014 after the film was picked up. During pre-production, Stone worked extensively with the music crew, in which she learned the song's technical points and tried to memorise it as well as she could. She performed it live on set with Hurwitz accompanying her on the piano. "Audition" garnered acclaim from film critics, as did Stone's emotional performance. It received nominations for the Academy and Critics' Choice Movie Award for Best Original Song. At the 89th Academy Awards, singer and pianist John Legend performed "Audition" and "City of Stars" in a medley accompanied by several dancers.

== Background ==
Damien Chazelle wrote the screenplay for La La Land in 2010. His idea was "to take the old musical but ground it in real life where things don't always exactly work out", and to salute creative people who move to Los Angeles to chase their dreams. He conceived the film's concept while he was a student at Harvard University with his classmate Justin Hurwitz. Chazelle said that La La Land reflects his own experiences as a filmmaker working his way up the Hollywood ladder. Chazelle was unable to produce the film for years as no studio was willing to finance an original contemporary musical with no familiar songs. Five years after Chazelle wrote the script and following the release of his critically acclaimed Whiplash (2014), Summit Entertainment and Black Label Media, along with producer Marc Platt, agreed to invest in La La Land and distribute it.

Hurwitz described the music as an "unbelievable amount of work and an unbelievable amount of passion". When writing the film's songs and score, he focused on whether the audience would remember them after watching La La Land. Hurwitz began by writing themes for the film and characters, some of which turned into songs. He and Chazelle selected duo Benj Pasek and Justin Paul (known collectively as Pasek and Paul)—who had written the songs to the stage musical Dear Evan Hansen—as the film's lyricists after they pitched the opening lyrics to "City of Stars".

== Writing and filming ==
"For 'Audition', I wasn't really listening to anything [for inspiration]. I wasn't really trying to sound like anything. I was just composing at the piano, and for that reason, I think the song comes from a very pure place and I felt like I was really composing from a place of emotion."

— Justin Hurwitz, Variety

"Audition (The Fools Who Dream)" was the final song Hurwitz wrote since he and Chazelle "wanted to understand what the rest of the music was in the movie before we tackled this". He started writing "Audition" in 2011, after Chazelle had finished La La Land's script. He partially based the song on "I Will Wait for You" from the musical film The Umbrellas of Cherbourg (1964). When La La Land was picked up in 2014, Chazelle and Hurwitz revisited a number of tracks, including "Audition". The song was composed quickly this time. According to Hurwitz, this was "because it had been percolating for so long"; as a result, he related to the story and Mia's character much more, as well as "the idea of being frustrated and not being able to do what you can do, ... because of so many years of not being able to get this movie made". According to Hurwitz, Emma Stone, who portrays Mia, sounded "better in one key for the fragile opening, and another for the emotive climax", so the music team had to explore some challenging modulations. In the film, "Audition" transitions from speech to song; Hurwitz initially wrote the spoken lines with pitches. He removed them, however, after rehearsing with Stone and Chazelle, and it became evident Mia had to "slip into song".

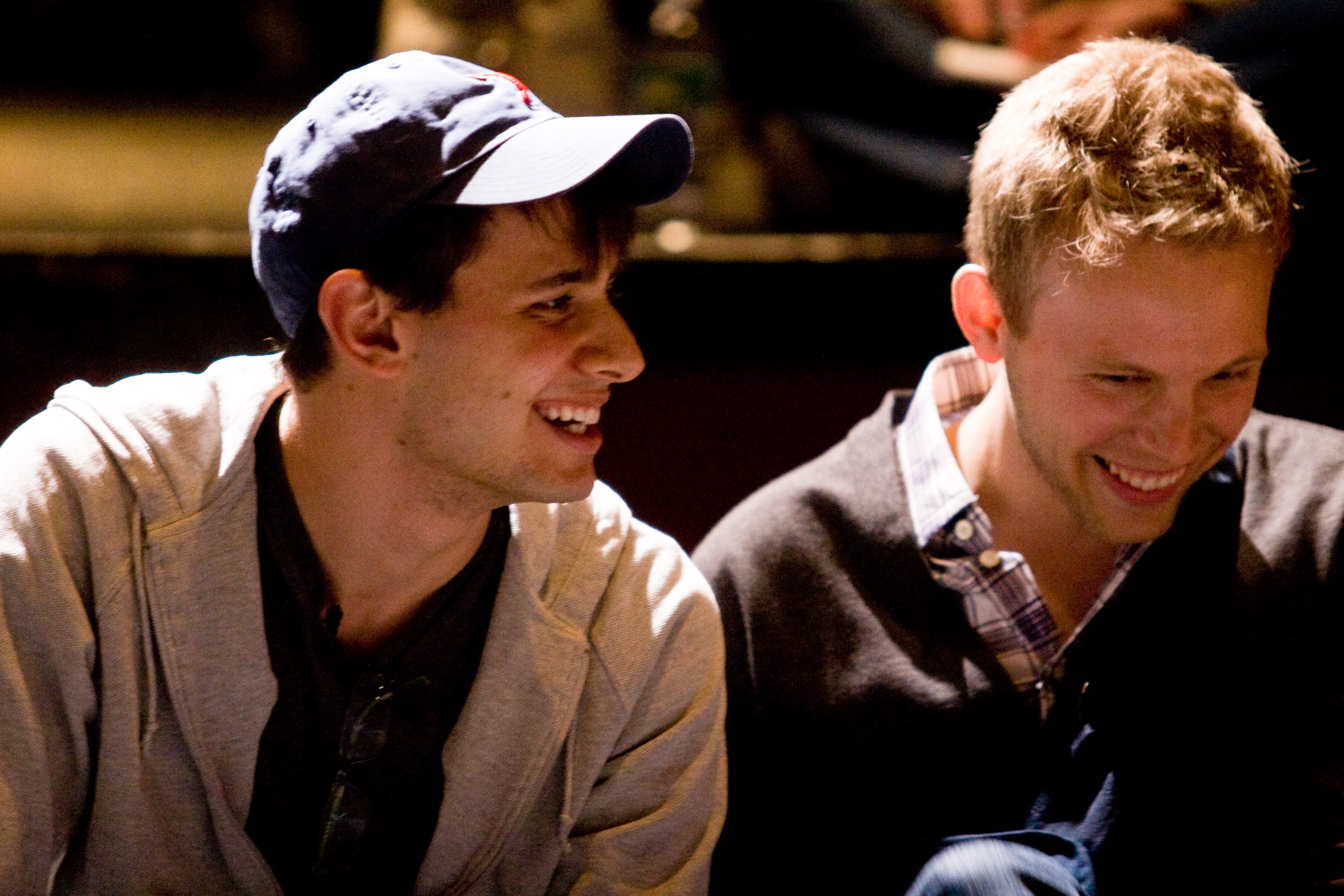
Songwriting duo Benj Pasek (left) and Justin Paul wrote the lyrics to "Audition"

Chazelle allowed Pasek and Paul to write lyrics with detailed narratives. According to Paul, "[t]here was never a push to write sort of more accessible pop-ified lyrics that were general and didn't tell stories much." Pasek was told by a musical theater professor that "a theater song you have to approach like it's a verb: It's what the action is and what's going to change"; Pasek and Paul attempted to make "Audition" as much of a "verb" as possible, as once Mia sings it, everything changes for her. They also took inspiration from a monologue Chazelle wrote for Stone.

During pre-production, the music team worked with Stone extensively. There are no cuts in the scene; thus, it had to be perfected entirely in one shot. Multiple rehearsals were held so she could learn the song's technical points, notes, and form; the plan was for her to memorise "Audition" so well that she focus on her character's emotions when filming. The camera movement was meticulously planned by the filmmakers, who shifted sets, pulled tables out, dimmed lighting, moved the camera around 360 degrees, and pulled back. While this was happening, Stone needed to ignore it and pretend none of it was occurring.

Stone performed "Audition" live on set and was not lip-syncing, as the crew did not "want any sort of pre-record that was done a week earlier when she was feeling a different thing or hearing the song a different way ... [or for] her to be boxed in with tempos or pacing or phrasing or anything". Hurwitz played the piano accompaniment live, allowing her to lead the song. Because of this, he was reacting to her, and as a result, the piano was somewhat behind the singing; Hurwitz stated that this contributed to the song's melodic, authentic, and honest feeling. The scene was filmed in approximately seven takes.

The song's orchestra includes string instruments and woodwinds. In the final recording, Randy Kerber plays the piano. Hurwitz observed that the piano interacts with the vocals in "such an intimate way and [the team] had to let [Kerber] kind of come to terms with the vocal performance and really feel it with the vocal in the way that [he] was feeling it on set with [Stone]"; he thus believed that it needed to be recorded independently from the orchestra. Writing the orchestral arrangement for "Audition" took some time. The music team spent a long time attempting to make it completely orchestral and eliminate the piano entirely; it took a while to calibrate the orchestra in such a way that it could enter gently and grow in an expansive way without overwhelming Stone's vocals.

== Context ==
In La La Land, "Audition" is a song sung by Mia about what it means to be someone who seeks a career in the arts. It takes place after a long absence of musical numbers, signifying how the film is "back in old-musical Heaven". Occurring during the third act, it forms the film's climax, in which Mia, an aspiring actress, attends an audition for a role in an upcoming film that will be "built around" her. During the audition, she is asked simply to tell a story. In response, she sings about how her aunt, a failed actress, inspired her to chase her dreams. Though "Audition" focuses on Mia's aunt, it has an overall theme about dreamers and how actors, though they appear somewhat insane, are essential to the world. The latter concept is combined with the film's emotions of love and loss. The scene has no cuts, and consists of a still and simple medium shot with a single spotlight and blue tone. The camera slowly zooms in on Mia's face as she sings.

== Composition and lyrics ==
"Audition" is a "sweeping, romantically orchestrated" emotional ballad with "a difficult rangy melody". The song begins in the key of F major and changes to A major. It later shifts to E major and back to A major. Stone's notes span over one octave, with a low of G_{3} and high of B_{4}. During the song, the word she changes to we, which Hurwitz said represented the overall shape of "Audition". According to Salon.com, over the course of "Audition", Stone gradually allows her voice to grow stronger and transition from vulnerability to pride.

The song begins softly, with Stone singing as if she is about to cry and is struggling to speak. During first chorus, the piano begins incorporating more dissonance at the line "Here's to the ones who dream", which is resolved in the major key using a major seventh at the line "Foolish as they may seem". According to Hurwitz, this reduces its "majorness" and makes the emotion feel more nuanced and unsettled, in lieu of simple and obvious. The string instruments—cellos, violas, and first violins—begin playing in the second verse. The winds and the brass enter during the song's second chorus. At the bridge, the woodwinds begin trilling as "[t]he orchestration now really takes over and does the heavy lifting". Stone is also belting in the song for the first time. The piano primarily plays quicker arpeggios for the remainder of "Audition". The strings make an upward gesture immediately following the line "Crazy as they may seem", which is the song's most optimistic moment. During the outro, the flute trills. The penultimate chord is a minor four chord. At the song's conclusion, the A major key is resolved to end "Audition" bittersweetly. Stone finishes the song by singing softly, like she did at the beginning. The piano stops playing at the last word, which is a cappella.

== Reception ==
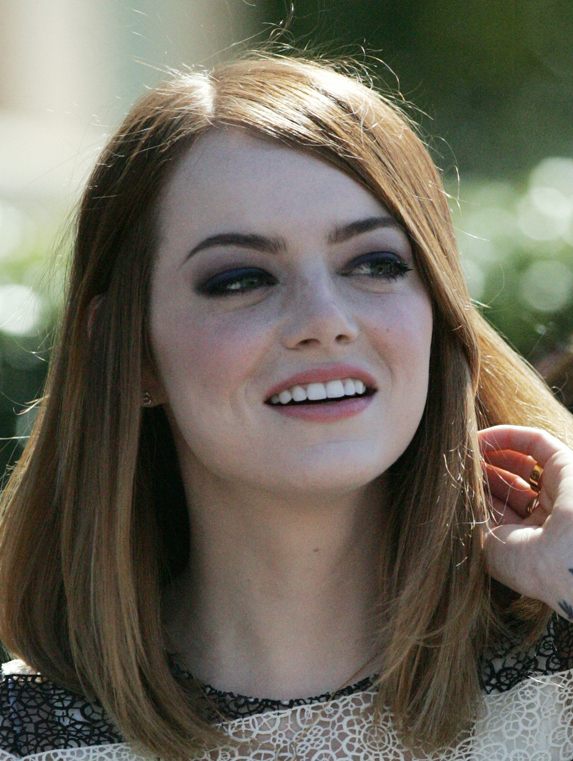
Emma Stone's emotional performance in "Audition" garnered critical acclaim

"Audition" received praise from film critics. Peter Travers of Rolling Stone called it a "plaintive showstopper", while USA Today described it as "a show-stopping ode to 'painters and poets and plays.'" New York Daily News said the song becomes a nostalgic memory; The Playlist and GamesRadar deemed it "unbelievably gorgeous" and "soul-baring" respectively. The Salt Lake Tribune considered the song "a heartbreaking number that starts as a spoken monologue and crescendos to a full-throated toast". According to Collider, "Audition" effectively blends Mia's ballad sensibility with Sebastian's melancholy cadence. David Sims of The Atlantic described the ballad as "resolute and soaring" and found that its message "feels right out of" classical Hollywood cinema.

Stone's performance was also well received. /Film argued Stone "brings the house down with the power of her emotion"; similarly, News.com.au asserted that her "expressive" eyes were mesmerising. Den of Geek found her dazzling, while Film School Rejects said that the scene might be key to an Academy Award win. According to Us Weekly, Stone shines in the film, especially in the "heartbreaking" "Audition". Variety's Owen Gleiberman stated that once she performs the song, Stone "is every inch a star". Washington City Paper commented that the various emotions she expressed in the scene are "remarkable". Parade wrote that "her raw, close-up performance ... will make you want to stand up and cheer". Jackson McHenry of Vulture, who was critical of Stone's singing, described the music as her "saving grace", stating "Audition" features "the world's most accommodating key change, the equivalent of going half a speed faster on a treadmill". Tampa Bay Times commended the direction of the musical sequence—including the blue lighting and the single spotlight on the Mia—stating it helped the audience immerse themselves.

Bustle ranked "Audition" La La Land's second-best song, commenting that it was "[s]tunning in both its specificity ... and its universality". Screen Rant named it the ninth-best song in the film, describing it as "very impactful" and praising Stone's emotion.

=== Accolades ===
Hurwitz wanted "Audition" to be La La Land's "award song", as he felt it was the "most special". However, industry professionals advised that "City of Stars" should take that role. Both songs were submitted for consideration for the Academy Award for Best Original Song. Journalists expected both to be nominated for the award. Alongside "City of Stars", "Audition" received a nomination for Best Original Song at the 89th Academy Awards. Commentators predicted that it would not win, and expected "City of Stars" or Moana's "How Far I'll Go" to prevail, though Vox stated "Audition" deserved the award. Ultimately, "City of Stars" won. "Audition" also received nominations for the Critics' Choice Movie Award, Hollywood Music in Media, and Satellite Award for Best Original Song, all of which it lost to "City of Stars". The St. Louis Film Critics Association picked it as the best song of the year.

== Live performance ==
At the 89th Academy Awards, American singer and pianist John Legend sang both "City of Stars" and "Audition", in which he weaved between each song in a single performance. He also played a grand piano. During his performance, dancers encircled lampposts against a purple, starry background resembling Los Angeles. Legend later released a recorded version of the two songs accompanied by Hurwitz's piano.

== Chart performance ==
Chart performance for "Audition (The Fools Who Dream)"
Chart (2017)	Peak position
France (SNEP)	122
Scottish Singles Sales (Official Charts)	99

== See also ==
- "Another Day of Sun"
- "City of Stars"
