= Pasek and Paul =

American songwriting duo

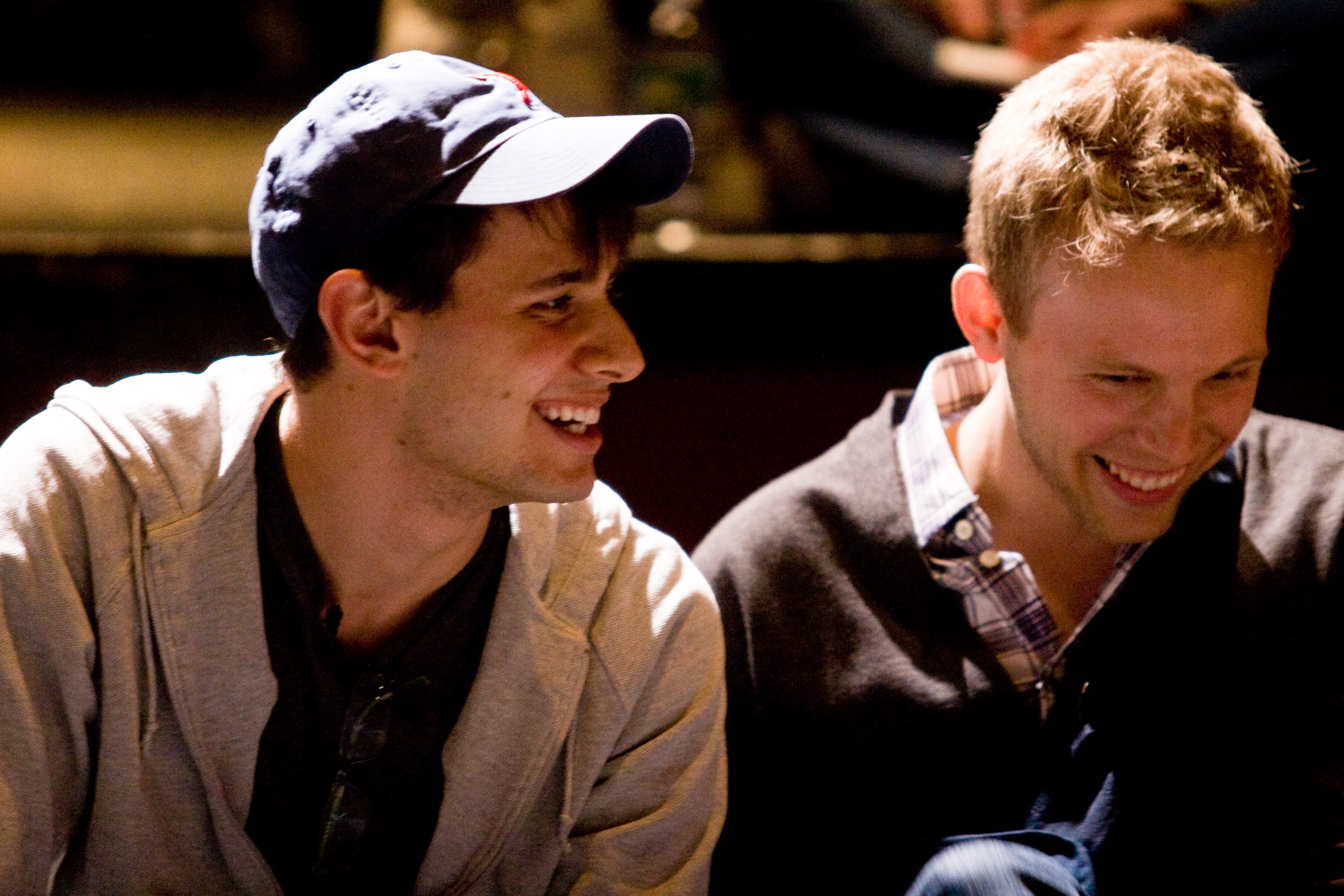
- Benj Pasek (left) and Justin Paul (right) in 2009

Background information
- Genre: Musical theatre
- Members: Benj Pasek; Justin Paul
- Website: pasekandpaul.com

Benj Pasek and Justin Paul, known together as Pasek and Paul, are an American songwriting duo and composing team for musical theater, films and television.

While Pasek usually writes lyrics and Paul usually writes music, they share credit for both elements. Both are graduates of the University of Michigan and winners of the American Theatre Wing's 2007 Jonathan Larson Grant, which honors achievements by composers, lyricists and librettists.

In September 2024, the duo became the 20th and 21st EGOT winners, breaking Robert Lopez's record for the fastest EGOT interval; the duo's interval was 7 years 7 months. Lopez & Pasek and Paul are also the three youngest EGOT winners, all at 39 years old.

== History ==
=== Start at the University of Michigan ===
Pasek and Paul started working together as freshmen at the University of Michigan. Together, they wrote Edges, a song cycle about the trials and tribulations of moving into adulthood and the search for meaning. Edges premiered in Ann Arbor, Michigan, on April 3, 2005.

On May 14, 2006, the duo made their New York City premiere: a benefit concert of original songs titled Become: The Music of Pasek & Paul. Presented by Jamie McGonnigal, performers included Cheyenne Jackson, Celia Keenan-Bolger, and Steven Pasquale. They also contributed to the 2006 off-Broadway musical White Noise: A Cautionary Musical, which won Talkin' Broadway's 2006 Summer Theatre Festival Citation for Outstanding Original Score.

=== Musical theatre ===
==== Early projects ====
Within several years, Edges had over 200 productions in countries including Australia, South Africa, Denmark, France, South Korea, the United Kingdom, Canada, the Philippines, and the United States.

Pasek and Paul wrote the score to the musical adaptation of Roald Dahl's James and the Giant Peach, which premiered in 2010 through Goodspeed Musicals. Other early works include If You Give A Pig A Pancake (2010) and Duck For President for Theatreworks USA, and Dr. Williams, written for the Orchard Project's 24 Hour Musicals benefit. The show starred Jesse Tyler Ferguson and Cheyenne Jackson. Pasek and Paul were featured in the 2011 documentary film One Night Stand about the process. They wrote the lyrics and music to the 2012 musical Dogfight, also contributing to A Christmas Story, The Musical, which was nominated for a Tony Award in 2013 for Best Original Score.

==== Dear Evan Hansen (2015) ====
Pasek and Paul wrote the music and lyrics to their musical Dear Evan Hansen. The musical, inspired by the death of a fellow student while Pasek was in high school, features book by Steven Levenson. Directed by Michael Greif and starring Ben Platt in the title role, it premiered at the Arena Stage in Washington, D.C. on July 30, 2015. It made its Off-Broadway debut in March 2016 at the Second Stage Theatre, and on Broadway on November 14, 2016, opening three weeks later at the Music Box Theatre. At the 71st Tony Awards, it was nominated for nine awards including Best Musical, Best Score, Best Book of a Musical, and Best Actor in a Musical for Platt. It won six awards including Best Musical and Best Original Score for the duo. At the 2018 Grammy Awards, Dear Evan Hansen won Best Musical Theater Album. The musical received the Edgerton Foundation New Play Award and a 2016 Obie Award for Musical Theatre. The show broke box office records at the Music Box Theatre and became the longest-running production to play the venue in Broadway’s history.

The musical made its West End debut at the Noël Coward Theatre in London on November 19, 2019, following previews in October of the same year. The show was nominated for seven Laurence Olivier Awards at the 2020 ceremony and won three: Best New Musical, Best Actor in a Musical for star Sam Tutty and Best Original Score or New Orchestrations for Pasek and Paul.

=== Television ===
The duo have written original music for several television shows. In 2007 and 2008 Pasek and Paul wrote music for the Disney Channel show Johnny and the Sprites, with songs used in six episodes and for one story in the season's premiere.

Their original material was featured on season 2 of NBC's Smash in 2013, and have risen to the Top 25 on the iTunes Pop Charts.

Pasek and Paul also wrote the original song "Runnin' Home to You" performed by Grant Gustin for The Flash episode "Duet", a musical crossover between The Flash and Supergirl. Melissa Benoist sang it in Supergirl's "Crisis on Earth-X" crossover episode.

They also wrote original songs for an episode of the Hulu show Only Murders in the Building, including "Look for the Light", a duet sung by Meryl Streep and Ashley Park. Another song, "Which of the Pickwick Triplets Did It?" was written by Pasek and Paul working for the first time in collaboration with Marc Shaiman and Scott Wittman of Hairspray fame. The tongue-twisting patter song was performed primarily by Only Murders actor Steve Martin, and also by Matthew Broderick for one episode, followed by Martin Short. They won a Primetime Emmy for "Which of the Pickwick Triplets Did It?" in 2024. In 2025, they reunited with Shaiman and Wittman to pen "Sometimes All You Need Is a Song," for Cynthia Erivo and the Broadway Inspirational Voices to perform as the opening number of the 78th Tony Awards.

=== Films ===
Pasek and Paul wrote the 2016 song "Get Back Up Again" for the film Trolls, as well as five original songs for the 2016 animated direct-to-video feature Tom and Jerry: Back to Oz.

They wrote the lyrics for the musical romantic comedy-drama film La La Land, which had music written by Justin Hurwitz. The film, in its world premiere, was the opening film at the 73rd Venice International Film Festival on August 31, 2016. The film's track "City of Stars", with their lyrics and composition by Justin Hurwitz, won the 2017 Golden Globe Award for Best Original Song. "City of Stars" and "Audition" received nominations for Best Original Song at the 89th Academy Awards, and they won the Academy Award for Best Original Song for "City of Stars." It was then announced in February 2023 that they would reunite with Hurwitz on a stage musical adaptation of the film currently in development, with a book by Ayad Akhtar and Matthew Decker and direction by Bartlett Sher.

Pasek and Paul wrote the songs for the 2017 musical drama film The Greatest Showman. About the Barnum & Bailey Circus, the film premiered on December 8, 2017. The duo's song "This Is Me" won a Golden Globe for Best Original Song and was nominated for Best Original Song at the 90th Academy Awards. A stage musical adaptation of the film is set to open at the Bristol Hippodrome in Bristol in the spring of 2026, with Pasek and Paul returning to write additional new songs for the show.

In collaboration with Alan Menken, Pasek and Paul wrote the lyrics for two new songs for Disney's 2019 live action film adaptation of Aladdin. The film also includes original 1992 song compositions written by Menken, Howard Ashman, and Tim Rice.

Pasek and Paul also adapted Dear Evan Hansen as a feature film for Universal Pictures and director Stephen Chbosky. They wrote two new songs for the film, including "The Anonymous Ones," which was written in collaboration with Amandla Stenberg for the character of Alana Beck, whom Stenberg plays in the film. They also wrote "A Little Closer" for the character of Connor Murphy, played by Colton Ryan, who reprises the role in which he understudied in the Broadway production. Paul also composed the film's underscore with Dan Romer. It premiered at the 2021 Toronto International Film Festival on September 9, 2021, followed by a release in theaters on September 24, 2021.

The duo has also written original songs for Sony Pictures Entertainment's live-action/animated adaptation of Bernard Waber's children's book Lyle, Lyle, Crocodile (released on October 7, 2022) and Apple Original Films' Spirited (November 11). Pasek and Paul have also written new songs for Disney's live-action remake of Snow White, released in March of 2025. They also collaborated with Pharrell Williams on songs for the semi-autobiographical musical drama Golden, reuniting them with Steven Levenson for the first time since Dear Evan Hansen. In February of 2025 it was announced that Golden was shelved and would never see release in any capacity.

It was also revealed in July of 2025 by Deadline that both Pasek and Paul would be writing new music for the upcoming Warner Bros. Pictures Animation CGI animated adaptation of the classic Dr. Seuss story, "Oh, the Places You'll Go" featuring the voices of Ariana Grande and Josh Gad with a 2028 expected release.

== Personal lives ==
Justin Noble Paul (born January 3, 1985) was born in Missouri, but raised in Connecticut. He graduated from the University of Michigan with a BFA in Musical Theatre. He is married to writer Asher Fogle Paul; he and his wife have four children. They have a daughter, born in 2016, and a son, born in 2018. In July 2020, they had their third child. The Pauls are practicing Christians.

Benjamin Pasek (born June 9, 1985), is the son of Temple University professor, child psychologist, and author Kathy Hirsh-Pasek. His alma mater is the University of Michigan and Friends' Central School. He is gay. Pasek was born into a Jewish family and grew up in Ardmore, Pennsylvania. He received a B.F.A. in musical theater from the University of Michigan, where he met Paul. He studied singing privately with Paul Spencer Adkins.

== Musicals ==
Year	Title	Notes
2005	Edges	Written at the University of Michigan
2010	James and the Giant Peach	Book by Timothy Allen McDonald
2012	Dogfight	Book by Peter Duchan
2012	A Christmas Story: The Musical	Book by Joseph Robinette
2015	Dear Evan Hansen	Book by Steven Levenson
2026	The Greatest Showman	Book by Tim Federle
TBA	La La Land	Music by Justin Hurwitz; Book by Ayad Akhtar and Matthew Decker
2027	Unorthodox	Music and lyrics by Benj Pasek and Shaina Taub; Book by Joshua Harmon

== Filmography ==
Year	Title	Notes
2016	Tom and Jerry: Back to Oz	Film songwriting debut; Wrote 5 new songs, including: "There's No Place Like Home," "All Hail! (What's Mine is Mine)," "Oh My, Oh My, Oh My!" and "A Mighty Fine Affair."
2016	Trolls	Writers of "Get Back Up Again"
2016	La La Land	Lyrics by Pasek and Paul, music by Justin Hurwitz; Won an Academy Award for Best Original Song for "City of Stars"; Won a Golden Globe Award for Best Original Song for "City of Stars"; Nominated for an Academy Award for Best Original Song for "Audition (The Fools Who Dream)"
2017	The Greatest Showman	Won a Golden Globe Award for Best Original Song for "This Is Me"; Nominated for an Academy Award for Best Original Song for "This Is Me"
2019	Aladdin	Wrote the lyrics for two new songs in collaboration with Alan Menken, including "Speechless"
2021	Dear Evan Hansen	Wrote two new songs, including: "The Anonymous Ones," with Amandla Stenberg and "A Little Closer."; Also executive producers
2022	Lyle, Lyle, Crocodile	Also executive producers
2022	Spirited	Also executive producers
2023	Only Murders in the Building	Composed songs for S3's "Death Rattle Dazzle" musical, also served as consulting producers for that season
2025	Snow White	New songs; Additional lyrics by Jack Feldman; Wrote "A Hand Meets a Hand" with Lizzy McAlpine
2028	Oh, the Places You'll Go!	Warner Bros. Pictures Animation adaptating the 1990 book by Dr. Seuss
N/A	Golden	Wrote songs in collaboration with Pharrell Williams; Cancelled before completion
