= Justin Hurwitz =

American composer and screenwriter

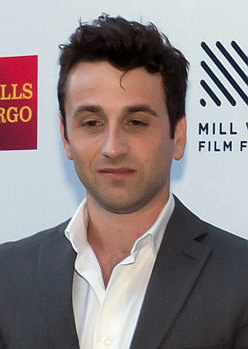
- Hurwitz in 2016
- Born: January 22, 1985 (age 41); Los Angeles, California, U.S.
- Education: Nicolet High School
- Alma mater: Harvard University
- Occupations: Composer, Writer

Justin Hurwitz (born January 22, 1985) is an American film composer and television writer. He is best known for his longtime friendship and collaboration with director Damien Chazelle, scoring each of his films: Guy and Madeline on a Park Bench (2009), Whiplash (2014), La La Land (2016), First Man (2018), and Babylon (2022).

For La La Land, Hurwitz won two Academy Awards, Best Original Score and Best Original Song (for "City of Stars"), as well as Golden Globe Awards for Best Original Score and Best Original Song and the BAFTA Award for Best Film Music. He has won two Grammy Awards for La La Land, one for Best Compilation Soundtrack for Visual Media and another one for Best Score Soundtrack for Visual Media. He won two additional Golden Globes for Original Score for First Man and Babylon.

== Early life ==
Hurwitz is the son of Gail Hurwitz (née Halabe), a professional ballet dancer turned registered nurse, and Ken Hurwitz, a writer. He is of Russian, Polish, Syrian, and Lebanese descent.

Hurwitz attended Harvard University, where he was roommates with director Damien Chazelle. They collaborated on a student film that would become Guy and Madeline on a Park Bench, which was released in 2009. While in college, Hurwitz was a member of the Harvard Lampoon, and was an original member of the indie-pop band Chester French with Chazelle.

== Career ==
After graduating college, Hurwitz and Chazelle moved to Los Angeles, where Hurwitz wrote comedy for the sitcom The League and one episode of the animated comedy TV series The Simpsons. After the success of Guy and Madeline, they were able to obtain financing for their next collaboration, the 2014 film Whiplash – with Hurwitz scoring the film and Chazelle writing and directing. The film was a box office success, grossing over $50 million on a $3.3 million budget during its original theatrical run. Hurwitz also scored Chazelle's 2016 film La La Land, for which Chazelle won the Academy Award for Best Director, and Hurwitz won two Academy Awards for Best Original Score and Best Original Song.

Benj Pasek, Justin Paul and Hurwitz will return as songwriters for the upcoming stage musical adaptation of the film, directed by Bartlett Sher from a book by Ayad Akhtar and Matthew Decker, with Marc Platt and Lionsgate returning to produce.

== Filmography ==
=== Films ===
| Year | Film | Role |
|---|---|---|
| 2009 | Guy and Madeline on a Park Bench | Composer |
| 2014 | Whiplash | Composer |
| 2016 | La La Land | Composer |
| 2018 | First Man | Composer |
| 2022 | Babylon | Composer |

=== Television ===
| Year | Title | Role | Notes |
|---|---|---|---|
| 2011 | Perfect Couples | Writer | Episode: "Perfect Exes" |
| 2011 | The Simpsons | Writer | Episode: "The Falcon and the D'ohman" |
| 2011–2015 | The League | Writer | 7 episodes |
| 2017–2024 | Curb Your Enthusiasm | Writer/Producer | 12 episodes |

=== Musicals ===
| Year | Title | Notes |
|---|---|---|
| TBA | La La Land | Lyrics by Benj Pasek and Justin Paul; Book by Ayad Akhtar and Matthew Decker |
