= Tunnelen =

2016 short film by André Øvredal

- Directed by: André Øvredal
- Written by: André Øvredal; Alice Glaser (short story)
- Produced by: John Einar Hagen
- Cinematography: Nicholas Müller-Osborne
- Edited by: Patrick Larsgaard
- Music by: Johannes Ringen
- Production company: Eldorado Film Pravda
- Distributed by: Hollywood Video
- Release date: 16 April 2016; (Tribeca Film Festival)
- Running time: 14 minutes
- Country: Norway
- Language: English

Tunnelen, also released under the English title The Tunnel, is a 2016 Norwegian short science fiction film written and directed by André Øvredal, based on a short story by Alice Glaser.

== Plot ==
A family returning home from a swim are caught in slow-moving traffic among a sea of identical black hearselike self-driving cars along a multilane highway leading to a tunnel. At times the tunnel must be closed, forcing all vehicles to shut down and giving people time to stand outside. Peter befriends a girl named Eva from a car in the next lane. As they approach the tunnel, it becomes apparent that it is used as a means of population reduction. While passing through it, they are concerned that they will be caught in it during the next closure. A car from another lane decides to change lanes within the tunnel, delaying the family's progress. They make it out of the tunnel just before its next closure. Peter looks around but cannot find Eva's car.

== Cast ==
- Siri Helene Müller as Jeanette
- Kyrre Haugen Sydness as Tom
- Max Admundsen as Peter
- Maria Dingsøyr-Henriksen as Anne
- Gio Fonseca as Luka
- Ella Glenton Schjerven as Eva

== Release ==
The short film premiered at the Tribeca Film Festival on 16 April 2016. It was later included as a special feature on the home video release of The Autopsy of Jane Doe.

== Awards ==
The short film won the Méliès d'Argent at the 2016 Strasbourg European Fantastic Film Festival.

== Reception ==
In a positive review for Deluxe Video Online, Neil Worcester wrote: "From the opening credits, I was thrilled with The Tunnel."

== Analysis ==
In an interview with Rue Morgue about the production of The Long Walk, which he is no longer involved in, Øvredal noted: "I did a short film called The Tunnel that premiered at the Tribeca Film Festival three years ago, and it's a very similar story. When I read the script [of The Long Walk], which is so close to the book—it really honors what King wrote in a beautiful way—I felt like I had told the story, but in a different way, which connected to the idea of being on a journey you cannot stop. It's an unstoppable journey, and the only way out is death, really."
