= Alice Glaser =

American writer and magazine editor (1928–1970)

- Alice Glaser, 1950
- Born: October 3, 1928; United States
- Died: August 22, 1970 (aged 41); New York, United States
- Education: Radcliffe College
- Occupation: Editor of Esquire
- Spouse: Jean-Paul Surmain
- Writing career
- Language: English
- Years active: 1950s–1960s

Alice Glaser (October 3, 1928 — August 22, 1970) was an American writer and an editor at Esquire magazine.

== Early life ==
Alice Glaser was raised on Long Island, the daughter of Hilda Glaser and Lewis Glaser. She attended Woodmere High School, graduating in 1946. She completed her undergraduate studies at Radcliffe College in 1950, with a senior thesis on Joseph Conrad.

== Career ==
From 1958, Glaser worked at Esquire magazine, eventually as associate editor under Harold Hayes. In that position, she was regularly in contact with prominent authors and potential authors, such as Martin Luther King Jr. and Diane Arbus. She also wrote articles for the magazine. One of her contributions in 1963, "Back on the Open Road for Boys", described the week she spent in India with Allen Ginsberg. Other articles by Glaser included an interview with "the last of the Seneca chiefs" in 1964, and "Hair!" (1965), an exploration of teen girls' beauty culture.

She also wrote book reviews for the Chicago Tribune. In 1961, her dystopian story "The Tunnel Ahead" was published in The Magazine of Fantasy and Science Fiction. The story has been much anthologized and was adapted into the award-winning short film The Tunnel (Tunnelen, 2016) by André Øvredal.

== Personal life ==
Glaser died in 1970 after a fall, possibly a suicide, at age 41, in New York.
