= Yeshiva Gedolah of the Five Towns =

School in New York, United States

- ישיבה מסורת התורה

Location
- 218 Mosher Avenue, Woodmere, New York; United States; 40.633461°N 73.712137°W

Information
- Other names: Yeshiva Mesoras HaTorah; YGFT
- Type: Yeshiva
- Religious affiliation: Orthodox Judaism
- Established: 2003; 23 years ago
- Gender: Male
- Enrollment: 70
- Website: ygft.org

Yeshiva Gedolah of the Five Towns (YGFT, Hebrew: ישיבה מסורת התורה, romanized: Yeshiva Mesoras HaTorah) is a yeshiva located in Woodmere, New York.

== History ==
The school was founded in 2003 by its rosh kollel, Yitzchak Knobel and its rosh yeshiva (dean) Moshe Zev Katzenstein. Its first location was a storefront on West Broadway, moving in 2014 to a building at 218 Mosher Avenue in Woodmere, New York.

== Description ==
The school has approximately seventy students and several rabbis on staff. The primary goals of the yeshiva include advancing the students' level of Torah study, particularly Talmud, and strengthening their character traits through the study of mussar.

The yeshiva's students are involved in inspecting the Five Towns eruv on a weekly basis. The yeshiva is currently remodeling the Hewlett eruv.
