= List of accolades received by La La Land =

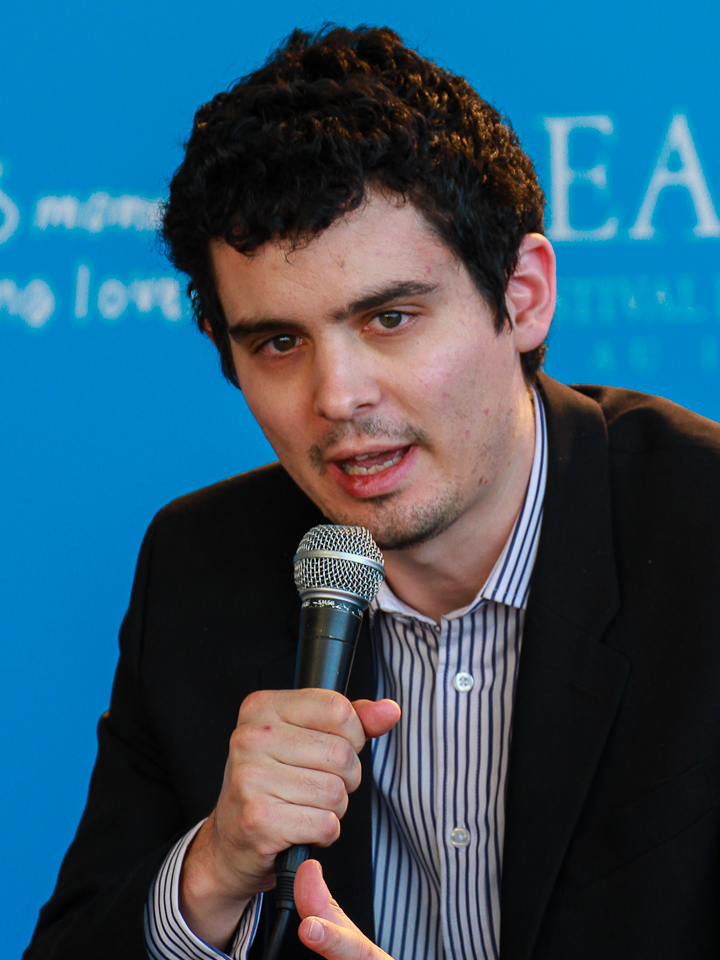
- Damien Chazelle received several awards and nominations for his screenplay and direction, including the Academy Award for Best Director, becoming the youngest winner in the category at 32.
Awards and nominations
Award	Wins	Nominations
Academy Awards	6	14
British Academy Film Awards	5	11
Critics' Choice Awards	8	12
Golden Globe Awards	7	7
Grammy Awards	2	4
Screen Actors Guild Awards	1	2

Totals (Note: Certain award groups do not simply award one winner. They acknowledge several different recipients, have runners-up, and have third place. Since this is a specific recognition and is different from losing an award, runner-up mentions are considered wins in this award tally. For simplification and to avoid errors, each award in this list has been presumed to have had a prior nomination.)
- Wins: 125
- Nominations: 303

La La Land is a 2016 American romantic musical comedy-drama film written and directed by Damien Chazelle. Starring Ryan Gosling and Emma Stone, the film focuses on two young people struggling to make ends meet in Los Angeles while pursuing their dreams as artists. Justin Hurwitz composed the film's musical score, while Linus Sandgren was the cinematographer. David and Sandy Reynolds-Wasco were responsible for the production design and Mary Zophres designed the costumes.

La La Land premiered at the 73rd Venice International Film Festival on August 31, 2016, where Stone won the Volpi Cup Award for Best Actress. The film had a limited release on December 9, 2016, in Los Angeles and New York City, before expanding wider starting December 16. The film was successful at the box office, earning over $430 million against its $30 million budget. Rotten Tomatoes, a review aggregator, surveyed 425 reviews and judged 91% to be positive. The film has been nominated for 265 awards, winning 112; its direction, screenplay, music and the performances of Gosling and Stone have received the most attention from award groups.

La La Land received 14 nominations at the 89th Academy Awards, tying records for most nominations by a single film with All About Eve (1950) and Titanic (1997). It won six, Best Director (Chazelle), Best Actress (Stone), Best Cinematography (Sandgren), Best Original Score (Hurwitz), Best Original Song ("City of Stars"), and Best Production Design (the Wascos). At the ceremony, the film was also incorrectly announced as the winner for Best Picture (which it lost to Moonlight) after the presenters had been given the wrong envelope, and Chazelle became the youngest winner of the Best Director award. The film garnered a leading seven Golden Globe Award nominations—Best Motion Picture – Musical or Comedy, Best Director, Best Actor – Musical or Comedy for Gosling, Best Actress – Musical or Comedy, Best Screenplay, Best Original Score, and Best Original Song ("City of Stars"). Winning all of its nominations, it became the film with the most Golden Globe Awards.

La La Land also led the 70th British Academy Film Awards with five wins and 11 nominations. It won for Best Film, Best Actress in a Leading Role, Best Direction, Best Cinematography, and Best Film Music. At the 23rd Screen Actors Guild Awards, both Stone and Gosling were nominated for their leading roles, with Stone winning for Lead Actress. At the 22nd Critics' Choice Awards, the film was nominated for 12 awards. It won eight, including Best Picture, Best Director, and Best Score. The film's soundtrack won Best Compilation Soundtrack for Visual Media and Best Score Soundtrack for Visual Media at the 60th Annual Grammy Awards. In addition, the American Film Institute selected La La Land as one of its ten films of the year.

== Accolades ==
Accolades
Award	Date of ceremony	Category	Recipient(s)	Result	Ref.
AACTA International Awards	January 8, 2017	Best Film	La La Land	Won	
AACTA International Awards	January 8, 2017	Best Direction	Damien Chazelle	Nominated	
AACTA International Awards	January 8, 2017	Best Actor	Ryan Gosling	Nominated	
AACTA International Awards	January 8, 2017	Best Actress	Emma Stone	Won	
AACTA International Awards	January 8, 2017	Best Screenplay	Damien Chazelle	Nominated	
AARP Annual Movies for Grownups Awards	February 6, 2017	Best Picture	La La Land	Nominated	
AARP Annual Movies for Grownups Awards	February 6, 2017	Best Comedy	La La Land	Won	
Academy Awards	February 26, 2017	Best Picture	Fred Berger, Jordan Horowitz, and Marc Platt	Nominated	
Academy Awards	February 26, 2017	Best Director	Damien Chazelle	Won	
Academy Awards	February 26, 2017	Best Actor	Ryan Gosling	Nominated	
Academy Awards	February 26, 2017	Best Actress	Emma Stone	Won	
Academy Awards	February 26, 2017	Best Original Screenplay	Damien Chazelle	Nominated	
Academy Awards	February 26, 2017	Best Cinematography	Linus Sandgren	Won	
Academy Awards	February 26, 2017	Best Costume Design	Mary Zophres	Nominated	
Academy Awards	February 26, 2017	Best Film Editing	Tom Cross	Nominated	
Academy Awards	February 26, 2017	Best Original Score	Justin Hurwitz	Won	
Academy Awards	February 26, 2017	Best Original Song	"Audition (The Fools Who Dream)" by Justin Hurwitz, Benj Pasek, and Justin Paul	Nominated	
Academy Awards	February 26, 2017	Best Original Song	"City of Stars" by Justin Hurwitz, Benj Pasek, and Justin Paul	Won	
Academy Awards	February 26, 2017	Best Production Design	Production Design: David Wasco; Set Decoration: Sandy Reynolds-Wasco	Won	
Academy Awards	February 26, 2017	Best Sound Editing	Ai-Ling Lee and Mildred Iatrou Morgan	Nominated	
Academy Awards	February 26, 2017	Best Sound Mixing	Andy Nelson, Ai-Ling Lee, and Steven A. Morrow	Nominated	
American Cinema Editors	January 27, 2017	Best Edited Feature Film – Comedy or Musical	Tom Cross	Won	
Alliance of Women Film Journalists	December 21, 2016	Best Film	La La Land	Nominated	
Alliance of Women Film Journalists	December 21, 2016	Best Director	Damien Chazelle	Nominated	
Alliance of Women Film Journalists	December 21, 2016	Best Actor	Ryan Gosling	Nominated	
Alliance of Women Film Journalists	December 21, 2016	Best Actress	Emma Stone	Nominated	
Alliance of Women Film Journalists	December 21, 2016	Best Screenplay, Original	Damien Chazelle	Nominated	
Alliance of Women Film Journalists	December 21, 2016	Best Cinematography	Linus Sandgren	Nominated	
Alliance of Women Film Journalists	December 21, 2016	Best Editing	Tom Cross	Nominated	
American Society of Cinematographers	February 4, 2017	Outstanding Achievement in Cinematography in Theatrical Releases	Linus Sandgren	Nominated	
Art Directors Guild Awards	February 11, 2017	Excellence in Production Design for a Contemporary Film	David Wasco	Won	
Austin Film Critics Association	December 28, 2016	Best Film	La La Land	2nd Place	
Austin Film Critics Association	December 28, 2016	Best Director	Damien Chazelle	Nominated	
Austin Film Critics Association	December 28, 2016	Best Actor	Ryan Gosling	Nominated	
Austin Film Critics Association	December 28, 2016	Best Original Screenplay	Damien Chazelle	Nominated	
Austin Film Critics Association	December 28, 2016	Best Cinematography	Linus Sandgren	Won	
Austin Film Critics Association	December 28, 2016	Best Score	Justin Hurwitz	Won	
Australian Film Critics Association	March 7, 2017	Best International Film (English Language)	La La Land	Nominated	
Boston Society of Film Critics	December 11, 2016	Best Film	La La Land	Won	
Boston Society of Film Critics	December 11, 2016	Best Director	Damien Chazelle	Won	
Boston Society of Film Critics	December 11, 2016	Best Editing	Tom Cross	Won	
British Academy Film Awards	February 12, 2017	Best Film	Fred Berger, Jordan Horowitz, and Marc Platt	Won	
British Academy Film Awards	February 12, 2017	Best Actor in a Leading Role	Ryan Gosling	Nominated	
British Academy Film Awards	February 12, 2017	Best Actress in a Leading Role	Emma Stone	Won	
British Academy Film Awards	February 12, 2017	Best Direction	Damien Chazelle	Won	
British Academy Film Awards	February 12, 2017	Best Original Screenplay	Damien Chazelle	Nominated	
British Academy Film Awards	February 12, 2017	Best Cinematography	Linus Sandgren	Won	
British Academy Film Awards	February 12, 2017	Best Editing	Tom Cross	Nominated	
British Academy Film Awards	February 12, 2017	Best Film Music	Justin Hurwitz	Won	
British Academy Film Awards	February 12, 2017	Best Production Design	David and Sandy Reynolds-Wasco	Nominated	
British Academy Film Awards	February 12, 2017	Best Costume Design	Mary Zophres	Nominated	
British Academy Film Awards	February 12, 2017	Best Sound	Ai-Ling Lee, Mildred Iatrou Morgan, Steven A. Morrow, and Andy Nelson	Nominated	
Casting Society of America	January 19, 2017	Feature Big Budget – Comedy	La La Land	Won	
Chicago Film Critics Association	December 15, 2016	Best Film	La La Land	Nominated	
Chicago Film Critics Association	December 15, 2016	Best Director	Damien Chazelle	Nominated	
Chicago Film Critics Association	December 15, 2016	Best Actress	Emma Stone	Nominated	
Chicago Film Critics Association	December 15, 2016	Best Cinematography	Linus Sandgren	Won	
Chicago Film Critics Association	December 15, 2016	Best Editing	Tom Cross	Won	
Chicago Film Critics Association	December 15, 2016	Best Original Score	Justin Hurwitz	Nominated	
Chicago Film Critics Association	December 15, 2016	Best Art Direction	La La Land	Nominated	
Cinema Audio Society Awards	February 18, 2017	Outstanding Achievement in Sound Mixing for a Motion Picture – Live Action	James Ashwill, Nicholai Baxter, David Betancourt, Ai-Ling Lee, Steven A. Morrow, and Andy Nelson	Won	
Costume Designers Guild	February 21, 2017	Excellence in Contemporary Film	Mary Zophres	Won	
Critics' Choice Awards	December 11, 2016	Best Picture	La La Land	Won	
Critics' Choice Awards	December 11, 2016	Best Director	Damien Chazelle	Won	
Critics' Choice Awards	December 11, 2016	Best Actor	Ryan Gosling	Nominated	
Critics' Choice Awards	December 11, 2016	Best Actress	Emma Stone	Nominated	
Critics' Choice Awards	December 11, 2016	Best Original Screenplay	Damien Chazelle	Won (Note: Tied with Kenneth Lonergan for Manchester by the Sea)	
Critics' Choice Awards	December 11, 2016	Best Cinematography	Linus Sandgren	Won	
Critics' Choice Awards	December 11, 2016	Best Costume Design	Mary Zophres	Nominated	
Critics' Choice Awards	December 11, 2016	Best Editing	Tom Cross	Won	
Critics' Choice Awards	December 11, 2016	Best Art Direction	David and Sandy Reynolds-Wasco	Won	
Critics' Choice Awards	December 11, 2016	Best Score	Justin Hurwitz	Won	
Critics' Choice Awards	December 11, 2016	Best Song	"Audition (The Fools Who Dream)" by Justin Hurwitz, Pasek and Paul	Nominated	
Critics' Choice Awards	December 11, 2016	Best Song	"City of Stars" by Justin Hurwitz, Pasek and Paul	Won	
Dallas–Fort Worth Film Critics Association	December 13, 2016	Best Actor	Ryan Gosling	4th Place	
Dallas–Fort Worth Film Critics Association	December 13, 2016	Best Actress	Emma Stone	2nd Place	
Dallas–Fort Worth Film Critics Association	December 13, 2016	Best Director	Damien Chazelle	2nd Place	
Dallas–Fort Worth Film Critics Association	December 13, 2016	Best Cinematography	Linus Sandgren	Won	
Dallas–Fort Worth Film Critics Association	December 13, 2016	Best Musical Score	Justin Hurwitz	Won	
Detroit Film Critics Society	December 19, 2016	Best Film	La La Land	Won	
Detroit Film Critics Society	December 19, 2016	Best Actor	Ryan Gosling	Nominated	
Detroit Film Critics Society	December 19, 2016	Best Actress	Emma Stone	Won	
Detroit Film Critics Society	December 19, 2016	Best Director	Damien Chazelle	Won	
Detroit Film Critics Society	December 19, 2016	Best Screenplay	Damien Chazelle	Won	
Directors Guild of America Awards	February 4, 2017	Outstanding Directing – Feature Film	Damien Chazelle	Won	
Dorian Awards	January 26, 2017	Film of the Year	La La Land	Nominated	
Dorian Awards	January 26, 2017	Director of the Year	Damien Chazelle	Nominated	
Dorian Awards	January 26, 2017	Film Performance of the Year — Actress	Emma Stone	Nominated	
Dorian Awards	January 26, 2017	Film Performance of the Year — Actor	Ryan Gosling	Nominated	
Dorian Awards	January 26, 2017	Screenplay of the Year	Damien Chazelle	Nominated	
Dorian Awards	January 26, 2017	Visually Striking Film of the Year	La La Land	Won	
Empire Awards	March 19, 2017	Best Film	La La Land	Nominated	
Empire Awards	March 19, 2017	Best Actor	Ryan Gosling	Nominated	
Empire Awards	March 19, 2017	Best Actress	Emma Stone	Nominated	
Empire Awards	March 19, 2017	Best Soundtrack	La La Land	Won	
Empire Awards	March 19, 2017	Best Production Design	La La Land	Nominated	
Florida Film Critics Circle	December 23, 2016	Best Film	La La Land	Runner-up	
Florida Film Critics Circle	December 23, 2016	Best Director	Damien Chazelle	Won	
Florida Film Critics Circle	December 23, 2016	Best Actor	Ryan Gosling	Nominated	
Florida Film Critics Circle	December 23, 2016	Best Actress	Emma Stone	Runner-up	
Florida Film Critics Circle	December 23, 2016	Best Screenplay	Damien Chazelle	Nominated	
Florida Film Critics Circle	December 23, 2016	Best Cinematography	Linus Sandgren	Won	
Florida Film Critics Circle	December 23, 2016	Best Art Direction/Production Design	La La Land	Won	
Florida Film Critics Circle	December 23, 2016	Best Score	La La Land	Won	
Georgia Film Critics Association	January 13, 2017	Best Picture	La La Land	Nominated	
Georgia Film Critics Association	January 13, 2017	Best Director	Damien Chazelle	Won	
Georgia Film Critics Association	January 13, 2017	Best Actor	Ryan Gosling	Nominated	
Georgia Film Critics Association	January 13, 2017	Best Actress	Emma Stone	Nominated	
Georgia Film Critics Association	January 13, 2017	Best Original Screenplay	Damien Chazelle	Won	
Georgia Film Critics Association	January 13, 2017	Best Cinematography	Linus Sandgren	Nominated	
Georgia Film Critics Association	January 13, 2017	Best Production Design	David Wasco and Austin Gorg	Won	
Georgia Film Critics Association	January 13, 2017	Best Original Score	Justin Hurwitz	Won	
Georgia Film Critics Association	January 13, 2017	Best Original Song	"Audition (The Fools Who Dream)" by Justin Hurwitz, Pasek and Paul	Nominated	
Georgia Film Critics Association	January 13, 2017	Best Original Song	"City of Stars" by Justin Hurwitz, Benj Pasek, and Justin Paul	Won	
Golden Eagle Award	January 26, 2018	Best Foreign Language Film	La La Land	Nominated	
Golden Globe Awards	January 8, 2017	Best Motion Picture – Musical or Comedy	La La Land	Won	
Golden Globe Awards	January 8, 2017	Best Actor – Motion Picture Musical or Comedy	Ryan Gosling	Won	
Golden Globe Awards	January 8, 2017	Best Actress – Motion Picture Musical or Comedy	Emma Stone	Won	
Golden Globe Awards	January 8, 2017	Best Director	Damien Chazelle	Won	
Golden Globe Awards	January 8, 2017	Best Screenplay	Damien Chazelle	Won	
Golden Globe Awards	January 8, 2017	Best Original Score	Justin Hurwitz	Won	
Golden Globe Awards	January 8, 2017	Best Original Song	"City of Stars" by Justin Hurwitz, Pasek and Paul	Won	
Golden Tomato Awards	January 12, 2017	Best Musical/Music Movie 2016	La La Land	Won	
Goldene Kamera	March 4, 2017	Best International Film	La La Land	Won	
Grammy Award	January 28, 2018	Best Compilation Soundtrack for Visual Media	La La Land	Won	
Grammy Award	January 28, 2018	Best Score Soundtrack for Visual Media	Justin Hurwitz	Won	
Grammy Award	January 28, 2018	Best Song Written for Visual Media	"City of Stars" by Justin Hurwitz, Benj Pasek, and Justin Paul	Nominated	
Grammy Award	January 28, 2018	Grammy Award for Best Arrangement, Instrumental and Vocals	"Another Day of Sun" by Justin Hurwitz, Benj Pasek, and Justin Paul	Nominated	
Guild of Music Supervisors Awards	February 16, 2017	Best Music Supervision for Films Budgeted Over $25 Million	Steven Gizicki for La La Land	Won	
Guild of Music Supervisors Awards	February 16, 2017	Best Song/Recording Created for a Film	Steven Gizicki (supervisor) for "City of Stars"	Won	
Hamptons International Film Festival	October 10, 2016	Audience Award: Best Narrative Feature	Damien Chazelle	Won	
Hollywood Film Awards	November 6, 2016	Hollywood Producer Award	Marc Platt (also for Billy Lynn's Long Halftime Walk and The Girl on the Train)	Won	
Hollywood Film Awards	November 6, 2016	Hollywood Cinematography Award	Linus Sandgren	Won	
Hollywood Music in Media Awards	November 17, 2016	Best Original Score – Feature Film	Justin Hurwitz	Nominated	
Hollywood Music in Media Awards	November 17, 2016	Best Song – Feature Film	"Audition (The Fools Who Dream)" by Justin Hurwitz, Pasek and Paul	Nominated	
Hollywood Music in Media Awards	November 17, 2016	Best Song – Feature Film	"City of Stars" by Justin Hurwitz, Pasek and Paul	Won	
Hollywood Music in Media Awards	November 17, 2016	Outstanding Music Supervision – Film	Steven Gizicki	Nominated	
Houston Film Critics Society	January 6, 2017	Best Picture	La La Land	Won	
Houston Film Critics Society	January 6, 2017	Best Actor	Ryan Gosling	Nominated	
Houston Film Critics Society	January 6, 2017	Best Actress	Emma Stone	Nominated	
Houston Film Critics Society	January 6, 2017	Best Director	Damien Chazelle	Won	
Houston Film Critics Society	January 6, 2017	Best Cinematography	Linus Sandgren	Won	
Houston Film Critics Society	January 6, 2017	Best Original Score	Justin Hurwitz	Won	
Houston Film Critics Society	January 6, 2017	Best Original Song	"Audition (The Fools Who Dream)" by Justin Hurwitz, Pasek and Paul	Nominated	
Houston Film Critics Society	January 6, 2017	Best Original Song	"City of Stars" by Justin Hurwitz, Pasek and Paul	Won	
Houston Film Critics Society	January 6, 2017	Best Screenplay	Damien Chazelle	Nominated	
Houston Film Critics Society	January 6, 2017	Best Poster	La La Land	Won	
Houston Film Critics Society	January 6, 2017	Technical Achievement	La La Land (production design)	Won	
IndieWire Critics Poll	December 19, 2016	Best Film	La La Land	3rd Place	
IndieWire Critics Poll	December 19, 2016	Best Director	Damien Chazelle	2nd Place	
IndieWire Critics Poll	December 19, 2016	Best Actress	Emma Stone	4th Place	
IndieWire Critics Poll	December 19, 2016	Best Actor	Ryan Gosling	7th Place	
IndieWire Critics Poll	December 19, 2016	Best Screenplay	La La Land	10th Place	
IndieWire Critics Poll	December 19, 2016	Best Original Score or Soundtrack	La La Land	2nd Place	
IndieWire Critics Poll	December 19, 2016	Best Cinematography	La La Land	2nd Place	
IndieWire Critics Poll	December 19, 2016	Best Editing	La La Land	3rd Place	
International Film Music Critics Association	February 23, 2017	Best Original Score for a Comedy Film	Justin Hurwitz	Won	
International Film Music Critics Association	February 23, 2017	Film Music Composition of the Year	Justin Hurwitz	Won	
International Film Music Critics Association	February 23, 2017	Film Score of the Year	Justin Hurwitz	Nominated	
Irish Film & Television Awards	April 8, 2017	International Film	La La Land	Nominated	
Irish Film & Television Awards	April 8, 2017	International Actor	Ryan Gosling	Nominated	
Irish Film & Television Awards	April 8, 2017	International Actress	Emma Stone	Won	
Location Managers Guild Awards	April 8, 2017	Outstanding Locations in Contemporary Film	Robert Foulkes and Steve Beimler	Won	
London Film Critics Circle	January 22, 2017	Film of the Year	La La Land	Won	
London Film Critics Circle	January 22, 2017	Director of the Year	Damien Chazelle	Nominated	
London Film Critics Circle	January 22, 2017	Actress of the Year	Emma Stone	Nominated	
London Film Critics Circle	January 22, 2017	Screenwriter of the Year	Damien Chazelle	Nominated	
London Film Critics Circle	January 22, 2017	Technical Achievement	Justin Hurwitz (music)	Nominated	
Los Angeles Film Critics Association	December 4, 2016	Best Film	La La Land	Runner-up	
Los Angeles Film Critics Association	December 4, 2016	Best Director	Damien Chazelle	Runner-up	
Los Angeles Film Critics Association	December 4, 2016	Best Music	Justin Hurwitz, Pasek and Paul	Won	
Los Angeles Film Critics Association	December 4, 2016	Best Cinematography	Linus Sandgren	Runner-up	
Los Angeles Film Critics Association	December 4, 2016	Best Editing	Tom Cross	Runner-up	
Los Angeles Film Critics Association	December 4, 2016	Best Production Design	David Wasco	Runner-up	
Make-Up Artists and Hair Stylists Guild	February 19, 2017	Feature-Length Motion Picture – Contemporary Make-Up	Angel Radefeld-Wright and Torsten Witte	Nominated	
Make-Up Artists and Hair Stylists Guild	February 19, 2017	Feature-Length Motion Picture – Contemporary Hair Styling	Frida Aradottir, Barbara Lorenz, and Jackie Masteran	Won	
Motion Picture Sound Editors	January 19, 2017	Sound Editing – Feature – Music in a Musical	Jason Ruder	Won	
National Society of Film Critics	January 7, 2017	Best Film	La La Land	3rd Place	
National Society of Film Critics	January 7, 2017	Best Director	Damien Chazelle	2nd Place	
National Society of Film Critics	January 7, 2017	Best Cinematography	Linus Sandgren	2nd Place	
New York Film Critics Circle	December 1, 2016	Best Film	La La Land	Won	
New York Film Critics Online	December 11, 2016	Best Use of Music	Justin Hurwitz	Won	
Online Film Critics Society	January 3, 2017	Best Picture	La La Land	Nominated	
Online Film Critics Society	January 3, 2017	Best Director	Damien Chazelle	Nominated	
Online Film Critics Society	January 3, 2017	Best Actor	Ryan Gosling	Nominated	
Online Film Critics Society	January 3, 2017	Best Actress	Emma Stone	Nominated	
Online Film Critics Society	January 3, 2017	Best Original Screenplay	Damien Chazelle	Nominated	
Online Film Critics Society	January 3, 2017	Best Editing	Tom Cross	Won	
Online Film Critics Society	January 3, 2017	Best Cinematography	Linus Sandgren	Won	
Palm Springs International Film Festival	January 2, 2017	Vanguard Award	La La Land	Won	
Producers Guild of America	January 28, 2017	Best Theatrical Motion Picture	Fred Berger, Jordan Horowitz, and Marc Platt	Won	
San Diego Film Critics Society	December 12, 2016	Best Film	La La Land	Runner-up	
San Diego Film Critics Society	December 12, 2016	Best Director	Damien Chazelle	Runner-up	
San Diego Film Critics Society	December 12, 2016	Best Actor	Ryan Gosling	Nominated	
San Diego Film Critics Society	December 12, 2016	Best Actress	Emma Stone	Runner-up	
San Diego Film Critics Society	December 12, 2016	Best Original Screenplay	Damien Chazelle	Nominated	
San Diego Film Critics Society	December 12, 2016	Best Editing	Tom Cross	Nominated	
San Diego Film Critics Society	December 12, 2016	Best Cinematography	Linus Sandgren	Runner-up (Note: Tied with James Laxton for Moonlight)	
San Diego Film Critics Society	December 12, 2016	Best Production Design	David Wasco	Runner-up	
San Diego Film Critics Society	December 12, 2016	Best Costume Design	Mary Zophres	Won	
San Diego Film Critics Society	December 12, 2016	Best Original Score	La La Land	Runner-up (Note: Tied with Jackie)	
San Diego Film Critics Society	December 12, 2016	Best Visual Effects	La La Land	Nominated	
San Francisco Film Critics Circle	December 11, 2016	Best Film	La La Land	Nominated	
San Francisco Film Critics Circle	December 11, 2016	Best Director	Damien Chazelle	Nominated	
San Francisco Film Critics Circle	December 11, 2016	Best Actor	Ryan Gosling	Nominated	
San Francisco Film Critics Circle	December 11, 2016	Best Original Screenplay	Damien Chazelle	Nominated	
San Francisco Film Critics Circle	December 11, 2016	Best Cinematography	Linus Sandgren	Nominated	
San Francisco Film Critics Circle	December 11, 2016	Best Production Design	David Wasco	Nominated	
San Francisco Film Critics Circle	December 11, 2016	Best Original Score	Justin Hurwitz	Nominated	
San Francisco Film Critics Circle	December 11, 2016	Best Film Editing	Tom Cross	Nominated	
Santa Barbara International Film Festival	February 3, 2017	Outstanding Performers of the Year	Ryan Gosling and Emma Stone	Won	
Satellite Awards	February 19, 2017	Best Film	La La Land	Won (Note: Tied with Manchester by the Sea)	
Satellite Awards	February 19, 2017	Best Director	Damien Chazelle	Nominated	
Satellite Awards	February 19, 2017	Best Actor	Ryan Gosling	Nominated	
Satellite Awards	February 19, 2017	Best Actress	Emma Stone	Nominated	
Satellite Awards	February 19, 2017	Best Original Screenplay	Damien Chazelle	Nominated	
Satellite Awards	February 19, 2017	Best Cinematography	Linus Sandgren	Nominated	
Satellite Awards	February 19, 2017	Best Original Score	Justin Hurwitz	Won	
Satellite Awards	February 19, 2017	Best Original Song	"Audition (The Fools Who Dream)" by Justin Hurwitz, Pasek and Paul	Nominated	
Satellite Awards	February 19, 2017	Best Original Song	"City of Stars" by Justin Hurwitz, Pasek and Paul	Won	
Satellite Awards	February 19, 2017	Best Art Direction and Production Design	David Wasco	Won	
Satellite Awards	February 19, 2017	Best Film Editing	Tom Cross	Nominated	
Satellite Awards	February 19, 2017	Best Costume Design	Mary Zophres	Nominated	
Satellite Awards	February 19, 2017	Best Sound	La La Land	Nominated	
Saturn Awards	June 28, 2017	Best Independent Film	La La Land	Won	
Saturn Awards	June 28, 2017	Best Music	Justin Hurwitz	Won	
Screen Actors Guild Awards	January 29, 2017	Outstanding Performance by a Male Actor in a Leading Role	Ryan Gosling	Nominated	
Screen Actors Guild Awards	January 29, 2017	Outstanding Performance by a Female Actor in a Leading Role	Emma Stone	Won	
Seattle Film Critics Society	January 5, 2017	Best Picture of the Year	La La Land	Nominated	
Seattle Film Critics Society	January 5, 2017	Best Director	Damien Chazelle	Nominated	
Seattle Film Critics Society	January 5, 2017	Best Actor in a Leading Role	Ryan Gosling	Nominated	
Seattle Film Critics Society	January 5, 2017	Best Actress in a Leading Role	Emma Stone	Nominated	
Seattle Film Critics Society	January 5, 2017	Best Screenplay	Damien Chazelle	Nominated	
Seattle Film Critics Society	January 5, 2017	Best Cinematography	Linus Sandgren	Nominated	
Seattle Film Critics Society	January 5, 2017	Best Film Editing	Tom Cross	Nominated	
Seattle Film Critics Society	January 5, 2017	Best Original Score	Justin Hurwitz	Nominated	
Seattle Film Critics Society	January 5, 2017	Best Production Design	David and Sandy Reynolds-Wasco	Nominated	
Seattle Film Critics Society	January 5, 2017	Best Costume Design	Mary Zophres	Nominated	
Society of Operating Cameramen	February 11, 2017	Camera Operator of the Year Award	Ari Robbins	Won	
St. Louis Film Critics Association	December 18, 2016	Best Film	La La Land	Won	
St. Louis Film Critics Association	December 18, 2016	Best Director	Damien Chazelle	Won	
St. Louis Film Critics Association	December 18, 2016	Best Actor	Ryan Gosling	Nominated	
St. Louis Film Critics Association	December 18, 2016	Best Actress	Emma Stone	Nominated	
St. Louis Film Critics Association	December 18, 2016	Best Original Screenplay	Damien Chazelle	Nominated	
St. Louis Film Critics Association	December 18, 2016	Best Editing	Tom Cross	Runner-up (Note: Tied with John Gilbert for Hacksaw Ridge)	
St. Louis Film Critics Association	December 18, 2016	Best Cinematography	Linus Sandgren	Won	
St. Louis Film Critics Association	December 18, 2016	Best Production Design	David Wasco	Runner-up (Note: Tied with Jean Rabasse for Jackie and Stuart Craig for Fantastic Beasts and Where to Find Them)	
St. Louis Film Critics Association	December 18, 2016	Best Visual Effects	La La Land	Nominated	
St. Louis Film Critics Association	December 18, 2016	Best Music/Score	Justin Hurwitz	Won	
St. Louis Film Critics Association	December 18, 2016	Best Soundtrack	La La Land	Runner-up	
St. Louis Film Critics Association	December 18, 2016	Best Song	"Audition (The Fools Who Dream)"	Won	
St. Louis Film Critics Association	December 18, 2016	Best Song	"City of Stars"	Runner-up	
St. Louis Film Critics Association	December 18, 2016	Best Scene	Opening dance number, "Another Day of Sun"	Won	
Toronto Film Critics Association	December 11, 2016	Best Director	Damien Chazelle	Runner-up	
Toronto International Film Festival	September 18, 2016	People's Choice Award	Damien Chazelle	Won	
Vancouver Film Critics Circle	December 20, 2016	Best Film	La La Land	Nominated	
Vancouver Film Critics Circle	December 20, 2016	Best Actor	Ryan Gosling	Nominated	
Vancouver Film Critics Circle	December 20, 2016	Best Director	Damien Chazelle	Nominated	
Venice Film Festival	September 10, 2016	Golden Lion	Damien Chazelle	Nominated	
Venice Film Festival	September 10, 2016	Green Drop Award	Damien Chazelle	Nominated	
Venice Film Festival	September 10, 2016	Volpi Cup for Best Actress	Emma Stone	Won	
Village Voice Film Poll	December 21, 2016	Movie Everyone Is Wrong About	La La Land	Won	
Village Voice Film Poll	December 21, 2016	Best Director	Damien Chazelle	3rd place	
Village Voice Film Poll	December 21, 2016	Best Film	La La Land	6th place	
Village Voice Film Poll	December 21, 2016	Best Actress	Emma Stone	9th place	
Washington D.C. Area Film Critics Association	December 5, 2016	Best Film	La La Land	Won	
Washington D.C. Area Film Critics Association	December 5, 2016	Best Director	Damien Chazelle	Won	
Washington D.C. Area Film Critics Association	December 5, 2016	Best Actor	Ryan Gosling	Nominated	
Washington D.C. Area Film Critics Association	December 5, 2016	Best Actress	Emma Stone	Nominated	
Washington D.C. Area Film Critics Association	December 5, 2016	Best Original Screenplay	Damien Chazelle	Won	
Washington D.C. Area Film Critics Association	December 5, 2016	Best Art Direction	David and Sandy Reynolds-Wasco	Won	
Washington D.C. Area Film Critics Association	December 5, 2016	Best Cinematography	Linus Sandgren	Won	
Washington D.C. Area Film Critics Association	December 5, 2016	Best Editing	Tom Cross	Won	
Washington D.C. Area Film Critics Association	December 5, 2016	Best Score	Justin Hurwitz	Won	
Whistler Film Festival	November 30 – December 4, 2016	Audience Award	La La Land	Won	
Writers Guild of America Awards	February 19, 2017	Best Original Screenplay	Damien Chazelle	Nominated	
