= Michael Albert (artist) =

American artist and businessman (born 1966)

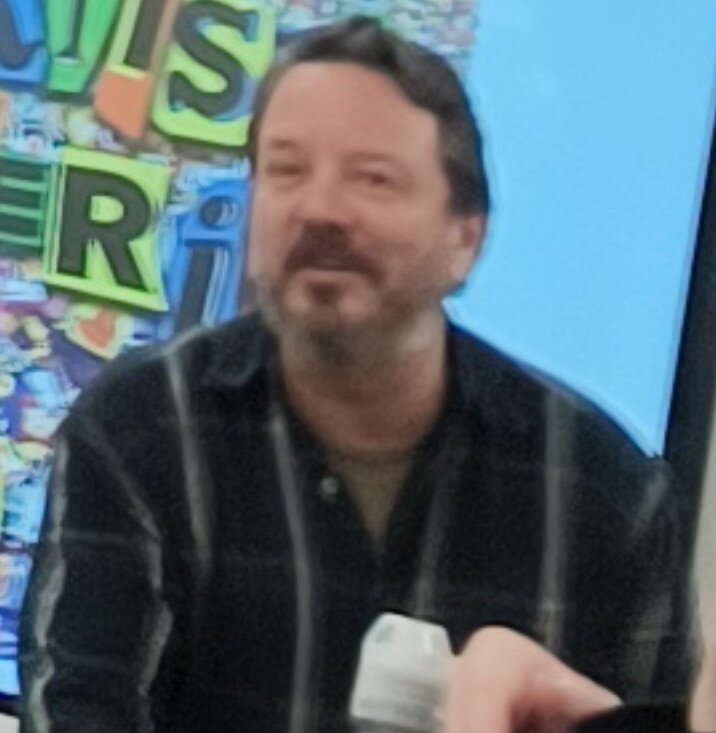
- Albert in 2026
- Born: October 14, 1966 (age 59); Far Rockaway, New York, US
- Education: New York University
- Notable work: "Frosted Flakes #1 The Birth of Cerealism" (1996); "The Last Breakfast" (2001); "The Gettysburg Address" (2003); "Heart" (2009); "Pi (777 digits)" (2009)
- Movement: Pop
- Spouse: Erynn Pindus Albert (m. 1991)
- Children: 4
- Website: michaelalbert.com

Michael Albert (born October 14, 1966) is an American artist and businessman. He is the founder and owner of the Sir Real Fruit Juice Company. He is part of the pop art movement and creates collages from cereal boxes.

== Early life and education ==
Albert was born on October 14, 1966, in Far Rockaway, Queens and grew up in Woodmere, New York. He is the second of three sons born to Larry and Wendy Albert. In 1991, he married Erynn Pindus, with whom he has four children.

Albert attended and graduated from P.S.#6 in Woodmere, Lawrence Junior High School and Lawrence High School in 1984. He attended New York University School of Business and Public Administration, and graduated with a B.S. in Business Administration in 1988. He majored in management with a minor in International Business.

== Career ==
=== Business ===
Upon graduation in May 1988, Albert co-founded a specialty foods distribution business with two schoolmates. The three began distributing Wild Lingonberry Juice and other specialty groceries to specialty food retailers throughout the greater New York Metropolitan area. In 1991, he founded Tri-State Natural Food Products Inc. In 1993, he the Sir Real Fruit Juice Company, which he operates in White Plains, New York.

=== Art ===
Albert began creating art while studying at New York University, mainly in his later years there. He drew extensively, mostly with wax oil sticks but also with pen and ink, colored pencils, markers, and crayons.

In 1994, Albert began creating collages from extra stickers he accumulated from junk mail and his home and business life, and in 1995, began making collages from surplus and discarded photographs. In 1996, he created his first completed pop artwork from a discarded Frosted Flakes cereal box (The Birth of Cerealism, 1996). Since then he has created more than 1,000 original collages by hand and has developed a recognizable style and exhibiting his work throughout the United States. Since 2000 he has been creating "Epic" scale collages that take months and years to create, each representing a theme, including historical, biblical, literary, mathematical, lyrical, botanical, and geographical.

In 2008, Albert's first book, An Artist's America, was published by Henry Holt and Company. The 48-page picture book is an autobiography and introduction to his art with a section showing how to create collages in his style.

As part of his "Modern Pop Art Experience" lecture, Albert travels the United States and Europe teaching at schools, libraries, and museums about creating collages from discarded cardboard consumer packages. He has brought this program to venues such as The Smithsonian Museum of American Art, The Eric Carle Museum of Picture Book Art, the New York Public Library, and the Chicago Public Library, among other places.
