= La La Land =

2016 film by Damien Chazelle

- Theatrical release poster
- Directed by: Damien Chazelle
- Written by: Damien Chazelle
- Produced by: Fred Berger; Jordan Horowitz; Gary Gilbert; Marc Platt
- Starring: Ryan Gosling; Emma Stone; John Legend; Rosemarie DeWitt
- Cinematography: Linus Sandgren
- Edited by: Tom Cross
- Music by: Justin Hurwitz (score and songs); Pasek and Paul (songs)
- Production companies: Summit Entertainment; Marc Platt Productions; Impostor Pictures; Gilbert Films
- Distributed by: Lionsgate
- Release dates: August 31, 2016 (Venice); December 9, 2016 (United States)
- Running time: 128 minutes
- Country: United States
- Language: English
- Budget: $30 million
- Box office: $540.8 million

La La Land is a 2016 American musical romantic comedy drama film written and directed by Damien Chazelle. It stars Ryan Gosling and Emma Stone as a struggling jazz pianist and an aspiring actress who meet and fall in love while pursuing their dreams in Los Angeles. The supporting cast includes John Legend, Rosemarie DeWitt, Finn Wittrock, and J. K. Simmons.

Having been fond of musicals during his time as a drummer, Chazelle first conceptualized the film alongside Justin Hurwitz while attending Harvard University together. After moving to Los Angeles in 2010, Chazelle penned the script but did not find a studio willing to finance the production without changes to his design. After the success of his film Whiplash (2014), the project was picked up by Summit Entertainment. Miles Teller and Emma Watson were originally in talks to star, but after both dropped out, Gosling and Stone were cast. Filming took place in Los Angeles between August and September 2015, with the film's score composed by Hurwitz, who also wrote the film's songs with lyricists Benj Pasek and Justin Paul and the dance choreography by Mandy Moore.

La La Land premiered at the 73rd Venice International Film Festival on August 31, 2016, and was released theatrically in the United States on December 9, by Lionsgate. The film emerged as a major commercial success, grossing $447.4 million worldwide during its initial run, and received widespread acclaim from critics, particularly for Chazelle's direction and screenplay, the performances of Gosling and Stone, the score, musical numbers, cinematography, visual style, costumes and production design.

It went on to receive numerous accolades, including winning a record seven awards at the 74th Golden Globe Awards and received eleven nominations at the 70th British Academy Film Awards, winning five, including Best Film. The film also received a record-tying fourteen nominations at the 89th Academy Awards, winning in six categories including Best Director and Best Actress (Stone). Its loss in the Best Picture category to Moonlight made it the most-nominated film at the Oscars to lose Best Picture, until Sinners' loss to One Battle After Another in 2026. At age 32, Chazelle became the youngest winner of Best Director. It has since been regarded as one of the best films of the 2010s and the 21st century, and as one of the best musical films of all time. (Note: Attributed to multiple references:) As of February 2023, a stage musical adaptation is in the works.

== Plot ==
While stuck in Los Angeles traffic ("Another Day of Sun"), jazz pianist Sebastian "Seb" Wilder has a moment of road rage directed at aspiring actress Amelia "Mia" Dolan. After a hard day at work, Mia's next audition goes awry because the casting director takes a phone call during an emotional scene. That night, her roommates take her to a lavish party in the Hollywood Hills, promising her that it could jump-start her career ("Someone in the Crowd"). After her car is towed, she walks home in disappointment.

During a gig at a restaurant, Seb slips into jazz improvisation despite the owner's warning to only play traditional Christmas pieces. Mia hears him playing as she passes by. Moved, she enters the restaurant and observes Seb being fired for his disobedience. Mia attempts to compliment him as he storms out, but he roughly shoulders past her. Months later, she runs into Seb at a party where he plays in a 1980s pop cover band. Mia requests that Seb play "I Ran" for her. After the gig, they walk to their cars and lament wasting the night on each other ("A Lovely Night"), despite their clear chemistry.

Seb arrives at the cafe where Mia works, and she shows him around the Warner Bros. backlot while expressing her passion for movies and acting. He takes her to a jazz club, where he shares his passion for jazz and his dream to open his own jazz club. Seb invites Mia to a screening of Rebel Without a Cause (1955) and she accepts. Mia later remembers a conflicting dinner date with her boyfriend, and initially forgoes the movie to go on the original date. However, finding herself bored with the date, she rushes to the theater and finds Seb just as the film begins. When the screening is interrupted by a projector malfunction, Seb and Mia spend the rest of the evening together with a romantic visit to the Griffith Observatory, where they share a kiss.

After more failed auditions, Mia decides, with Seb's encouragement, to write a one-woman play. Seb begins to perform regularly at a jazz club, and the two of them eventually move in together ("City of Stars"). Keith, a former bandmate of Seb's, invites him to be the keyboardist in a new jazz pop band, which will give him a steady income. Although dismayed by the band's pop style, Seb signs on after hearing Mia trying to convince her mother that he is working on his career. The band finds success, but Mia knows their music is not the type of music Seb wants to perform ("Start a Fire").

During the band's first tour, Seb and Mia argue. She accuses him of abandoning his dreams, while he insists that she liked him more when he was unsuccessful because it made her feel better about herself. Two weeks later, Seb misses Mia's play because of a photoshoot he had forgotten about. The play fails, very few people attend, and Mia overhears dismissive comments about her performance. Unable to forgive Seb for missing her play and for their previous argument, Mia breaks up with Seb and returns to her hometown of Boulder City, Nevada.

Seb receives a call from a prominent casting director who attended Mia's play, inviting her to audition for an upcoming film. Knowing that this could be her big break, he drives in a hurry to Boulder City to tell Mia. He successfully finds her house by recalling that she lived across the street from the library, where she first fell in love with acting. Seb persuades her to attend, and she reluctantly agrees to go.

During the audition the next day, Mia is asked to tell a story. In response, she sings about how her aunt, a one-time stage actress who eventually died from alcoholism, inspired her to chase her dreams ("Audition (The Fools Who Dream)"). Confident the audition was a success, Seb encourages Mia to devote herself to acting. The two recognize that they will always love each other despite what may come for their relationship.

Five years later, Mia is living a happy life as a successful actress and married to a different man, with whom she has a daughter. That night, the couple stumble upon a jazz bar. Recognizing the logo she had once designed, Mia realizes that Seb has opened his own jazz club. Seb notices Mia in the crowd so plays their love theme on the piano. The two imagine what their happy life together would have been ("Epilogue") had their relationship thrived along with their careers, then acknowledge each other with a silent exchange of smiles.

== Cast ==
- Ryan Gosling as Sebastian "Seb" Wilder, a musician who wants to open his own jazz club
- Emma Stone as Amelia "Mia" Dolan, an actress whose aunt inspired her to follow her dreams
- John Legend as Keith, Seb's friend and musician who invites him to join his band
- J. K. Simmons as Bill, the manager of the restaurant where Seb worked at before his firing
- Rosemarie DeWitt as Laura Wilder, Seb's sister
- Finn Wittrock as Greg, Mia's ex-boyfriend
- Callie Hernandez as Tracy, one of Mia's roommates
- Sonoya Mizuno as Caitlin, one of Mia's roommates
- Jessica Rothe as Alexis, one of Mia's roommates
- Tom Everett Scott as David
- Amiee Conn as The Famous Actress
- Anna Chazelle as Sarah
- Josh Pence as Josh
- Meagen Fay as Mia's mother
- Damon Gupton as Harry
- Jason Fuchs as Carlo
- Marius de Vries as Clyde
- Olivia Hamilton as Bree
- Hemky Madera as Jimmy
- Valarie Rae Miller as Amy Brandt
- Miles Anderson as Alistair the photographer
- Khirye Tyler as Seb's Pianist

== Production ==
=== Pre-production ===
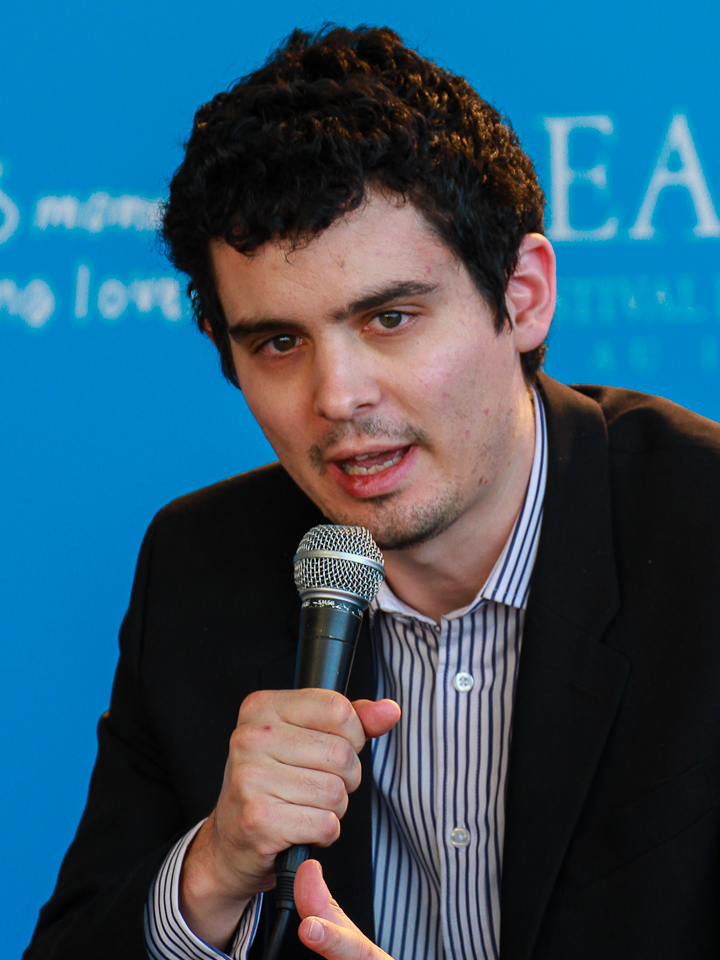
Chazelle first conceived the idea for the film while attending Harvard University with Justin Hurwitz, the film's composer.

As a drummer, Damien Chazelle is a big fan of musical films. He wrote the screenplay for La La Land in 2010, when the film industry seemed out of reach for him. His idea was "to take the old musical but ground it in real life where things don't always exactly work out," and to salute creative people who move to Los Angeles to chase their dreams. He conceived the film when he was a student at Harvard University with his classmate Justin Hurwitz. The two explored the concept in their senior thesis through a low-budget musical about a Boston jazz musician, Guy and Madeline on a Park Bench. Chazelle was moved by the tradition of 1920s "city symphony" films, such as Manhatta (1921) and Man with a Movie Camera (1929), that paid tribute to cities. After graduating, both moved to Los Angeles in 2010 and continued writing the script, but made a few modifications, such as altering the location to Los Angeles instead of Boston.

Rather than trying to match L.A. to the charms of Paris or San Francisco, he focused on the qualities that make the city distinctive: the traffic, the sprawl, and the skylines. The style and tone of the film were inspired by Jacques Demy's The Umbrellas of Cherbourg and The Young Girls of Rochefort, especially the latter, which was more dance and jazz-oriented. The film also makes visual allusions to Hollywood classics such as Broadway Melody of 1940, Singin' in the Rain, The Band Wagon, and An American in Paris. About An American in Paris, Chazelle commented: "That's a movie that we just pillaged. It's an awesome example of how daring some of those old musicals really were." It shares some character development and themes with Chazelle's previous musical work, Whiplash; Chazelle said:

"They're both about the struggle of being an artist and reconciling your dreams with the need to be human. La La Land is just much less angry about it."

He said that both films reflect his own experiences as a filmmaker working his way up the Hollywood ladder. La La Land in particular is inspired by his experience of moving from the East Coast with preconceived notions of what L.A. would be like, "that it was all just strip malls and freeways".

Chazelle was unable to produce the film for years as no studio was willing to finance an original contemporary musical with no familiar songs. It is also a jazz musical, which The Hollywood Reporter called an "extinct genre". He believed that since he and Hurwitz were unknown at that time, it might have made financiers dubious about the project's potential. Ryan Gosling's character Sebastian holds a view of the jazz of the past being superior. According to an article by Anthony Carew, Chazelle wrote this character trait as a reflection of "[his] own relationship with the past and with jazz, too". Chazelle found producers through friends who introduced him to Fred Berger and Jordan Horowitz. With the two producers on board, the script went to Focus Features at a budget of around $1 million. The studio demanded alterations: the male lead was asked to be changed from a jazz pianist to a rock musician, the complicated opening number had to be altered, and the story's bittersweet ending needed to be dropped. Chazelle refused and put the project on hold.

Chazelle later wrote Whiplash, which was an easier concept to sell and a less risky investment. After Whiplash was well received by critics upon its premiere at the 2014 Sundance Film Festival in January, Chazelle continued his efforts to bring La La Land to the big screen. A year later, when Whiplash earned five Oscar nominations at the 87th Academy Awards, including Best Picture, and grossed nearly $50 million worldwide off a $3.3 million production budget, Chazelle and his project began to attract attention from studios.

Five years after Chazelle wrote the script, Summit Entertainment and Black Label Media, along with producer Marc Platt, agreed to invest in La La Land and distribute it. They had been impressed by the critical and commercial success of Whiplash. Lionsgate's Patrick Wachsberger, who previously had worked on the Step Up franchise, pushed Chazelle to increase the film's budget since he felt high-quality musicals could not be made cheaply.

=== Casting ===
Miles Teller and Emma Watson were originally slated to star in the leading roles. Watson dropped out to honor her commitments to Disney's live-action Beauty and the Beast remake (2017), while Teller exited via long contract negotiations. Coincidentally, Gosling turned down the Beast role in Beauty and the Beast in favor of La La Land. Chazelle subsequently decided to make his characters somewhat older, with experience in struggling to make their dreams, rather than younger newcomers just arriving in Los Angeles.

Emma Stone plays Mia, an aspiring actress in Los Angeles. Stone has loved musicals since she saw Les Misérables when she was eight years old. She said "bursting into song has always been a real dream of mine", and her favorite film is the 1931 Charlie Chaplin romantic comedy City Lights. She studied pom dancing as a child, with a year of ballet. She moved to Hollywood with her mother at age fifteen to pursue a career, and struggled constantly to get an audition during her first year. When she did, she often was turned away after singing or saying just one line. Stone drew from her own experiences for her character of Mia, with some being added into the film.

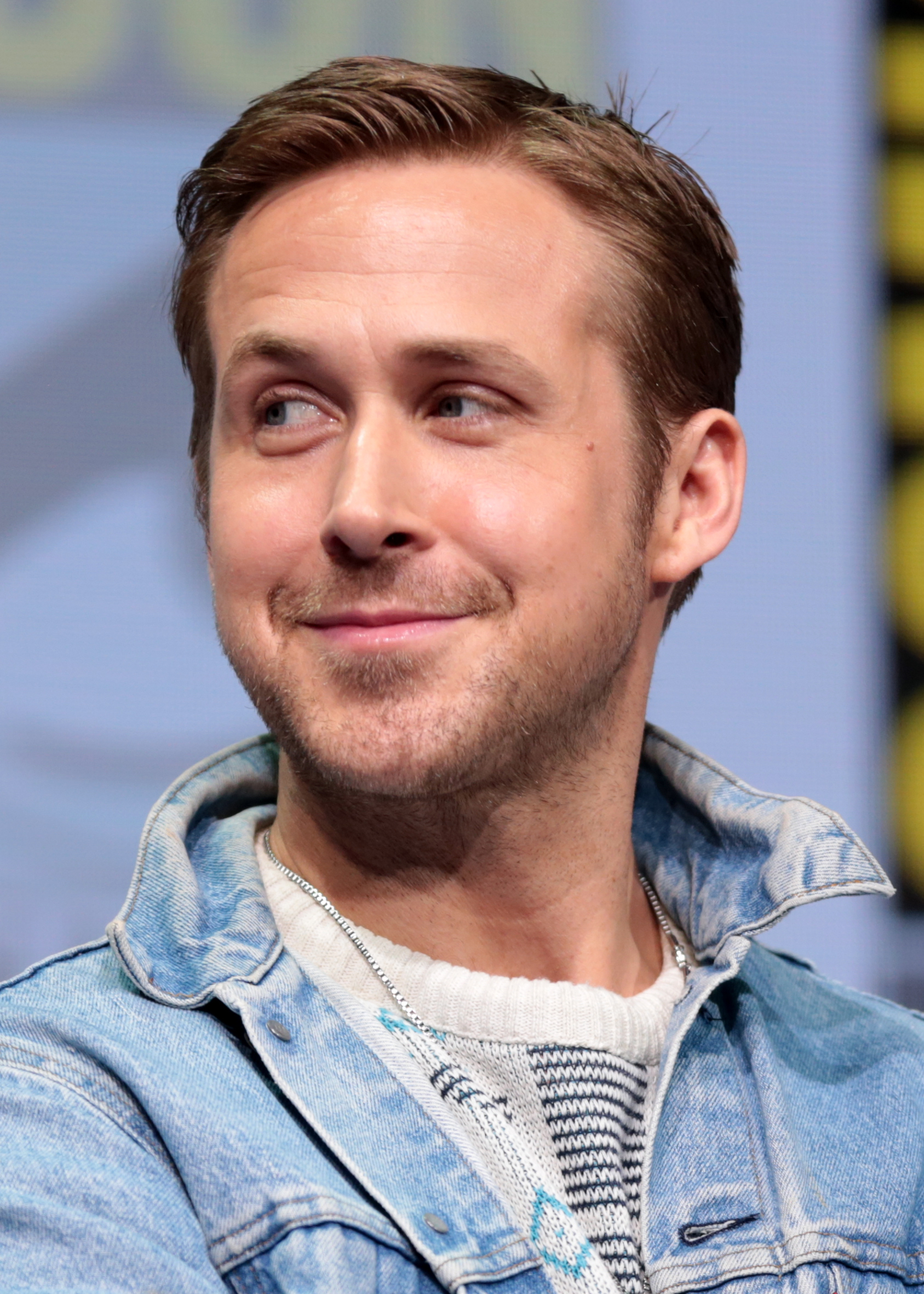
Ryan Gosling learned tap dancing and piano for his role.

She met Chazelle in 2014 while she was making her Broadway debut in Cabaret. Chazelle and Hurwitz saw her perform on a night when the actress had a cold. She met with Chazelle at Brooklyn Diner in New York City, where the director outlined his vision for the planned film. Stone gained confidence from performing in Cabaret to handle the demands of the film. In preparation for her role, Stone watched some of the musical movies that inspired Chazelle, including The Umbrellas of Cherbourg and Fred Astaire and Ginger Rogers collaborations. Stone accepted the offer because Chazelle was so passionate about the project.

Ryan Gosling plays Sebastian, a jazz pianist. Like Stone, Gosling drew from his own experiences as an aspiring artist. One incident was used for Mia. Gosling was performing a crying scene in an audition and the casting director took a phone call during it, talking about her lunch plans while he was emoting. Chazelle met with Gosling when he was about to begin filming for The Big Short. In addition to Gosling and Teller, Michael B. Jordan was also considered for the role of Sebastian.

Chazelle cast Gosling and Stone immediately after Summit bought the film. He stated that the duo "feel like the closest thing that we have right now to an old Hollywood couple" as akin to Spencer Tracy and Katharine Hepburn, Fred Astaire and Ginger Rogers, Humphrey Bogart and Lauren Bacall, and Myrna Loy and William Powell. The film marked the third collaboration between Gosling and Stone, following Crazy, Stupid, Love (2011) and Gangster Squad (2013). Chazelle asked the two about their audition disasters when they were both trying to make it. Both learned to sing and dance for the film's six original tunes.

The rest of the cast – J. K. Simmons, Sonoya Mizuno, Jessica Rothe, Callie Hernandez, Finn Wittrock, Rosemarie DeWitt, John Legend, Jason Fuchs, Meagen Fay – were announced between July and August 2015.

The film was choreographed by Mandy Moore. Rehearsals took place at a production office in Atwater Village, Los Angeles over the span of three to four months, beginning in May 2015. Gosling practiced piano in one room, Stone worked with Moore in another, and costume designer Mary Zophres had her own corner of the complex. Gosling, with no previous experience, had to learn how to play the piano; no hand models were used. Moore emphasized working on emotion rather than technique, which Stone said was key when they filmed the "A Lovely Night" scene (searching for the parked car). To help his cast and crew get their creative mode flowing, Chazelle held screenings on the soundstages every Friday night of classical films that had inspired him for the film, including The Umbrellas of Cherbourg, Singin' in the Rain, Top Hat, and Boogie Nights.

=== Filming ===
From the beginning, Chazelle wanted the film's musical numbers to be filmed "head to toe" and performed in a single take, like those of the 1930s works of Fred Astaire and Ginger Rogers. He also wanted the film to emulate the widescreen, CinemaScope look of 1950s musicals such as It's Always Fair Weather. Consequently, the movie was shot on celluloid 4-perf Super 35mm film (not digitally) with Panavision anamorphic lenses in CinemaScope's 2.55:1 aspect ratio, but not in true CinemaScope as that technology is no longer available.

Chazelle wanted Los Angeles to be the primary setting for his film, commenting that "there is something very poetic about the city I think, about a city that is built by people with these unrealistic dreams and people who kind of just put it all on the line for that." Principal photography on the film officially began in the city on August 10, 2015, and filming took place in more than 60 locations both in and near Los Angeles, including the Angels Flight trolley in downtown, houses in the Hollywood Hills, the Colorado Street Bridge, the Rialto Theatre in South Pasadena, the Warner Bros. studio lot, the Grand Central Market, Hermosa Beach's Lighthouse Café, Griffith Observatory, Griffith Park, Chateau Marmont, the Watts Towers, and Long Beach, with many scenes shot in one take. It took 40 days to complete shooting, finishing in mid-September 2015.

The opening pre-credits sequence was the first to be shot, and was filmed on a closed-off portion of two carpool direct connector ramps of the Judge Harry Pregerson Interchange, connecting the I-105 Carpool Lane to the I-110 Express Lanes, leading to Downtown Los Angeles. It was filmed in a span of two days, and required more than 100 dancers. For this particular scene, Chazelle wanted to give a sense of how vast the city is. The scene was originally planned for a stretch of ground-level highway, until Chazelle decided to shoot it in the 105–110 interchange, which arcs 100 feet (30 m) in the air. Production designer David Wasco said, "I thought somebody was going to fall off and get killed." Not every portion of the highway was blocked. Chazelle compared the scene to the yellow brick road leading to the Emerald City in The Wizard of Oz (1939).

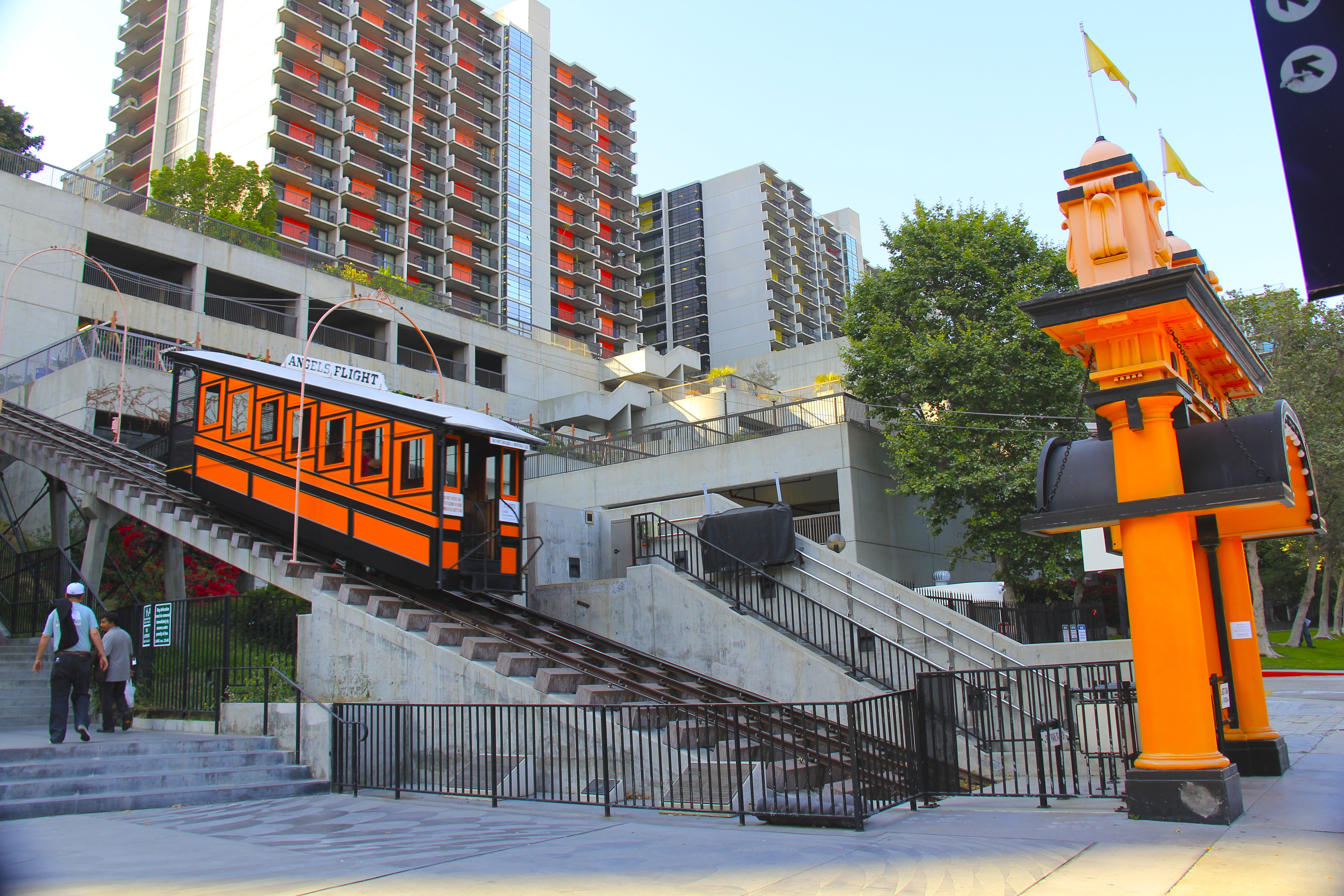
The Angels Flight (pictured), which was shut down for about four years, including at the time of the filming, was re-opened for a single day exclusively for the film to shoot a scene.

Chazelle scouted for "old L.A." locations that were in ruins, or were perhaps razed. One such example was the use of the Angels Flight trolley, built in 1901. The funicular had been closed in 2013 after a derailment. Attempts were made to repair and re-open the railway, but to no avail. However, the production team was able to secure permission to use it for a day. Chazelle and his crew then arranged to have it run for shooting (it was re-opened to the public in 2017). Mia works at a coffee shop on the Warner Bros. studio lot; Chazelle considered studio lots to be "monuments" of Hollywood. Production designer Wasco created numerous fake old film posters. Chazelle occasionally created names for them, deciding to use the title of his first feature, Guy and Madeline on a Park Bench (2009) for one poster, which reimagines it as a 1930s musical.

External videos
- The full "A Lovely Night" scene via YouTube

The now-iconic six-minute-long "A Lovely Night" scene (searching for the parked car) had to be completed during the brief "magic hour" moment at sunset. It took eight takes and two days to shoot it. When Ryan Gosling and Emma Stone finally nailed it, "everybody just exploded," Stone said. Since Gosling and Stone were not primarily dancers, the two made a number of mistakes, especially during long uninterrupted single-take musical numbers. However, Chazelle was very sympathetic towards them, understanding their lack of experience and not minding their errors. While shooting Sebastian and Mia's first dance together, Stone stumbled over the back of a bench, but picked right up and kept on going with the scene. In 2024, Gosling reflected on the filming of this scene, wishing he could re-film it to correct the positioning of his hand in the famous still frame from the sequence that was used throughout the film's marketing, saying that "It just killed the energy that way ... It was all leading to what? A lazy ... I call it La La Hand."

Chazelle said that the romantic dinner that Sebastian prepared for Mia was "one of the scenes that I think I wrote and rewrote and rewrote more than any other in the script". Gosling and Stone also helped create the dialogue of the scene to get it to be one of the more realistic scenes in a film filled with fantasy and fantastical elements.

Chazelle spent nearly a year editing the film with editor Tom Cross, as the two were primarily concerned with getting the tone right.

=== Soundtrack ===
The songs and score for La La Land were composed and orchestrated by Justin Hurwitz, Chazelle's Harvard University classmate, who also worked on his two prior films. The lyrics were written by Pasek and Paul, except for "Start a Fire", which was written by John Legend, Hurwitz, Marius de Vries and Angelique Cinelu. A soundtrack album was released on December 9, 2016, by Interscope Records, featuring selections from Hurwitz's score and songs performed by the cast.

The film's opening number, "Another Day of Sun", shot as a single tracking shot on an L.A. freeway, received praise for its choreography. The songs "City of Stars" and "Audition (The Fools Who Dream)" received numerous awards.

== Release ==
=== Theatrical ===
La La Land had its world premiere as the Venice Film Festival's opening night film on August 31, 2016. The film also screened at the Telluride Film Festival, the Toronto International Film Festival, beginning September 12, 2016, the BFI London Film Festival, the Middleburg Film Festival in late October 2016, the Virginia Film Festival, held at the University of Virginia on November 6, 2016, and the AFI Fest on November 15, 2016.

La La Land was originally set for a July 15, 2016, release; however, in March 2016, it was announced the film would be given a limited release starting December 2, 2016, before expanding on December 16, 2016. Chazelle stated that the change was because he felt that the release date was not right for the context of the film, and because he wanted to have a slow rollout beginning with the early fall film festivals. The limited release was later moved back a week to December 9, 2016, with the wide release still being planned for December 16, 2016. Lionsgate opened the film in five locations on December 9, 2016, and expanded it to about 200 theaters on December 16, 2016, before going nationwide on December 25, 2016. The film went fully wide on January 6, 2017, with a release into select IMAX theaters a week later.

La La Land was released in the United Kingdom on January 12, 2017. The film was released in the Netherlands on December 22, 2016, and in Australia on December 26, with the rest of the territories planned for a release from mid-January 2017.

La La Land will be re-released in theaters for its 10th anniversary, showing in Dolby Vision high dynamic range picture and Dolby Atmos immersive audio for the first time in AMC Theatres, on August 16, 2026. Its theatrical re-release came with a new poster, which is almost identical to the original poster. The position of Gosling's left hand was changed to be perpendicular just like Stone's left hand. Gosling had previously said that he regrets the way his left hand is positioned in the original poster, which he dubbed "La La Hand", and had recreated the poster during the marketing campaign for Project Hail Mary earlier that year in order to fix the pose.

=== Home media ===
Lionsgate released La La Land on Digital HD on April 11, 2017, and Blu-ray, Ultra HD Blu-ray and DVD on April 25, 2017.

== Reception ==
=== Box office ===
La La Land grossed $151.1 million in the United States and Canada, and $389.7 million in other territories, for a worldwide total of $540.8 million, against a production budget of $30 million. Deadline Hollywood calculated the net profit of the film to be $68.25 million, when factoring together all expenses and revenues for the film, making it one of the top 20 most profitable releases of 2016. This is Gosling's third highest-grossing film, surpassed in 2023 by Barbie and in 2026 by Project Hail Mary.

La La Land began its theatrical release with a limited release in five theaters in Los Angeles and New York City on December 9. It made $881,107 in its opening weekend, giving the film a per-theater average of $176,221, the best average of the year. In its second week of limited release, the film expanded to 200 theaters and grossed $4.1 million, finishing seventh at the box-office. It was an increase of 366% from the previous week and good for a per-theater of $20,510. The following week, the film had its wide expansion to 734 theaters, grossing $5.8 million for the weekend (including $4 million on Christmas Day and $9.2 million over the four days), and finishing eighth at the box-office. On January 6, 2017, the weekend of the Golden Globes, the film expanded to 1,515 theaters and grossed $10 million over the weekend, finishing fifth at the box-office. In its sixth week of release, the film grossed $14.5 million (a total of $16.9 million over the four-day weekend for Martin Luther King Jr. Day), finishing second at the box-office behind Hidden Figures. After receiving its 14 Oscar nominations, the film expanded to 3,136 theaters on January 27, 2017 (an increase of 1,271 from the week before) and grossed $12.1 million (up 43% from its previous week's $8.4 million). During the weekend of February 24–26 (the weekend of the Academy Awards) the film grossed $4.6 million, exactly the same amount it grossed the previous weekend. The next week, following its six Oscar wins, the film grossed $3 million.

=== Critical response ===
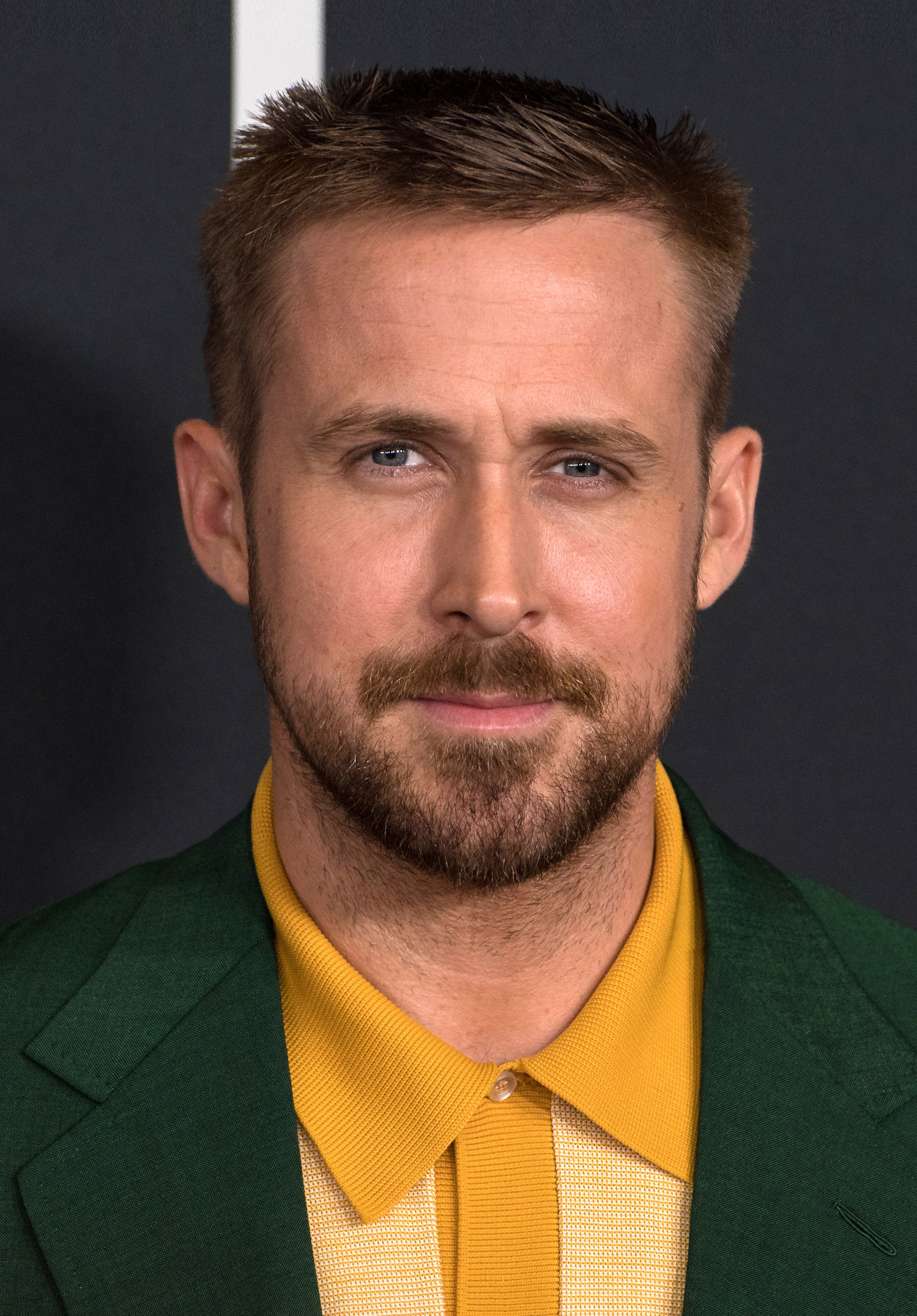
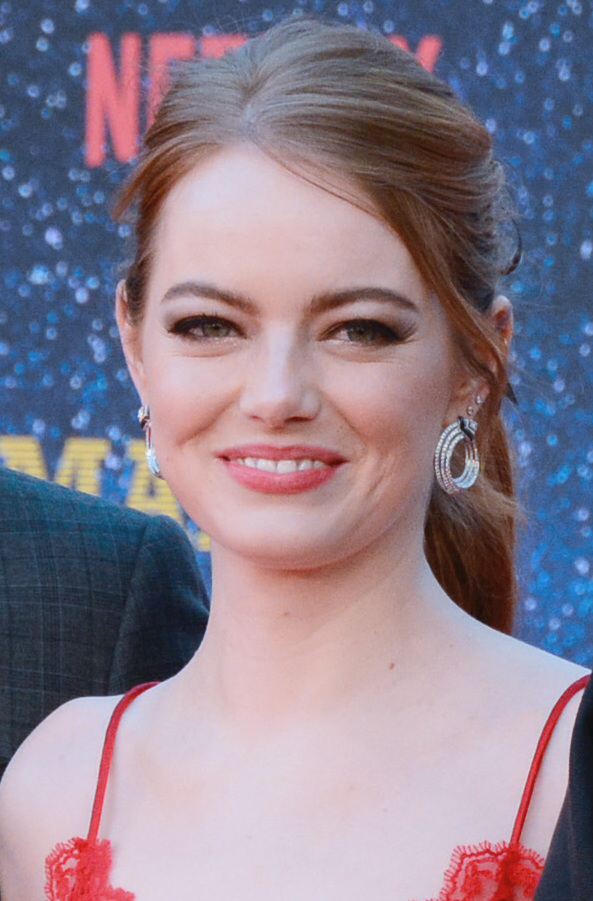
Ryan Gosling and Emma Stone garnered widespread critical acclaim for their performances, earning them Academy Award nominations for Best Actor and Best Actress, with Stone winning.

La La Land received widespread critical acclaim, with high praise directed towards Chazelle's direction and screenplay, cinematography, music, the performances of Gosling and Stone and their chemistry. The review aggregator Rotten Tomatoes gives the film an approval rating of 91% based on 469 reviews, with an average rating of 8.7/10. The website's critical consensus reads, "La La Land breathes new life into a bygone genre with thrillingly assured direction, powerful performances, and an irresistible excess of heart." On Metacritic, the film has a weighted average score of 94 out of 100, based on 54 critics, indicating "universal acclaim". It was the third- and sixth-highest scoring film released in 2016 on each respective site. Audiences polled by CinemaScore gave the film an average grade of "A−" on an A+ to F scale, while PostTrak reported audiences gave an 81% overall positive score and a 93% "definite recommend".

Peter Travers of Rolling Stone gave La La Land four stars out of four, describing it as "a hot miracle" and complimenting its musical numbers, particularly the opening scene. He went on to name it his favorite movie of the year. Michael Phillips of the Chicago Tribune similarly lauded the opening sequence, in addition to highlighting Stone's performance, stating "she's reason enough to see La La Land." Despite being less enthusiastic about Gosling's dancing and the film's middle section, Phillips nevertheless gave the film four out of four stars, declaring it "the year's most seriously pleasurable entertainment". A.O. Scott of The New York Times praised the film, stating that it "succeeds both as a fizzy fantasy and a hard-headed fable, a romantic comedy and a showbiz melodrama, a work of sublime artifice and touching authenticity". Peter Bradshaw of The Guardian awarded the film five out of five stars, describing it as "a sun-drenched musical masterpiece." Tom Charity of Sight & Sound stated, "Chazelle has crafted that rare thing, a genuinely romantic comedy, and as well, a rhapsody in blue, red, yellow and green." Writing for The Boston Globe, Ty Burr summarized the effectiveness of the film to relate to audiences stating: "...the movie traffics in the bittersweet happiness of treasuring things that are vanishing, like the unrealized future imagined in the climactic dance number, or those inky, star-filled dance floors that go on forever in old movies, or Hollywood musicals themselves. Or jazz: Sebastian has an early moment at a nightclub where he passionately sticks up for the music he loves. 'It's dying on the vine,' he says. 'And the world says 'Let it die. It had its time.' Well, not on my watch.' In that scene, he speaks for the director. By the end of La La Land, he's speaking for all of us." Filmmakers Jonathan Demme, Jay Duplass, Paul Feig, Chad Hartigan, Chris Kelly, Daniel Kwan, Rebecca Miller, Reed Morano, Christopher Nolan, James Ponsoldt and Nanfu Wang also praised the film.

Some critics and commentators connected La La Land's awards-season competition with Moonlight, amid the political climate following Donald Trump's election, to broader debates about racial representation and white privilege in Hollywood. While accolades from audiences and critics grew, the film received backlash for what some considered a disproportional amount of praise. Saturday Night Live lampooned the fervor over the film with a sketch about a man arrested for thinking it was "decent... but also boring." The film was criticized by some for its treatment of race and jazz. Kelly Lawler of USA Today noted that Gosling's character has been referred to as a "white savior" by some critics, for "his quest (and eventual success) to save the traditionally black musical genre from extinction, seemingly the only person who can accomplish such a goal." The sentiment was also expressed by Ruby Lott-Lavigna of Wired, Anna Silman of New York, and Ira Madison III of MTV News. Rex Reed of the New York Observer also took aim at the film's intention to emulate the MGM musical classics, writing that "the old-fashioned screenplay, by the ambitious writer-director Damien Chazelle, reeks of mothballs", and that "the movie sags badly in the middle, like a worn-out mattress that needs new springs". The South China Morning Post remarked that aside from its racial treatment of jazz, much of the public criticism was towards the film being "a little dull", the two leads' singing and dancing being considered unexceptional, and the lack of nuance in Stone's character, with Gosling's occasionally seen as insufferable.

=== Legacy ===
Since its release, La La Land continues to receive acclaim. It is regarded as a modern classic and one of the best films of all time due to its captivating performances, attention to detail, and its assent to previous movie musicals such as Singin' in the Rain. In 2019, CBC Radio included it on its list of "the greatest romantic movies of all time." In 2021, Helena Trauger of The Beacon called it the best film of the 2010s, stating that it is "one of the most creative and well-executed films that every person should attempt to watch at least once." In 2022, Time Out ranked it number 79 on its list of the "100 Best Films of the 21st Century," writing that it "has a signature all of its own, stopping traffic in the first glorious sequence."

MovieWeb ranked the film number 2 on its list of the "Best Movie Musicals of the 21st Century So Far," in 2022 as well. In 2023, it ranked it number 3 on its list of the "15 Greatest Movies About Jazz" and number 1 on its list of the "Best Modern Movies Shot on Film." It also ranked number 2 on Teen Vogue's list of "The 45 Best Dance Movies of All Time." The film ranked number 15 on Collider's list of the "30 Best Musicals of All Time," with Jeremy Urquhart writing, "It works as a modern update/homage to classic Hollywood musicals that were popular in the 1950s without ever feeling derivative or mocking, and Emma Stone and Ryan Gosling in the lead roles both give great performances that are up there with the best of their respective careers."

It also ranked number 8 on Parade's list of the "67 Best Movie Musicals of All Time," with Samuel R. Murrian writing that the film is "many things, thusly its own creation: deftly blending a modern showbiz melodrama, a giddy throwback, a striking love story." Screen Rant also ranked it at number 10 on its list "The 35 Best Musicals of All Time" and number 1 on its list of "The 12 Best Movie Musicals of the 21st Century," while IndieWire ranked it at number 12 on its list of "The 60 Best Movie Musicals of All Time." Wilson Chapman, curation editor for IndieWire, wrote that La La Land's story has just the right harmony of romance and melancholy, and that pieces such as "Another Day of Sun" and "A Lovely Night" are catchy and rememberable. He remarked that the Oscar-winning "City of Stars," as well as others of Hurwitz's scores, are "some of the finest written for any movie this century." (Note: Attributed to multiple references:)

In 2021, members of Writers Guild of America West (WGAW) and Writers Guild of America, East (WGAE) voted the film's screenplay 92nd in WGA's 101 Greatest Screenplays of the 21st Century (so far). In March 2025, The Washington Post ranked the film at number 13 on its list of "The 25 best movie musicals of the 21st century," with Ty Burr writing "The results are even closer to the touchstone of Jacques Demy's beloved 1964 Umbrellas of Cherbourg than the earlier film [Guy and Madeline on a Park Bench]: love lost, found and lost again amid an evocation of a city's hidden soul." In June 2025, actors Simu Liu and Molly Ringwald cited the film as among their favorites of the 21st century. In July 2025, it ranked number 16 on the "Readers' Choice" edition of The New York Times' list of "The 100 Best Movies of the 21st Century."

=== Cultural impact ===
Many elements of the film, including the visual style, use of colors, staging of the musical numbers and costume designs have been referenced numerous times in popular culture since its release. These include the entire opening segment of the 74th Golden Globe Awards, featuring parodies of "Another Day of Sun," "City of Stars" and the planetarium sequence with host Jimmy Fallon, Nicole Kidman, Amy Adams, Sarah Paulson, Courtney B. Vance, Sterling K. Brown, Evan Rachel Wood, Rami Malek, and Kit Harington participating, an independently produced short film parody set in New York City titled NY NY Land, a sketch on season 42 of Saturday Night Live where host Aziz Ansari plays a character who is interrogated over calling the film "overrated" because of its Oscar nominations, and a television commercial for the prescription Jardiance. The 2018 single "Love Scenario" by IKon drew heavy inspiration from the film's epilogue sequence. The 2021 Disney animated short film, Us Again, was also said to have been influenced by the film. In the closing of The Simpsons episode "Haw-Haw Land", it is stated that the episode was supposed to be a parody of Moonlight rather than La La Land (itself parodying the mistake at the 89th Academy Awards).

=== Accolades ===
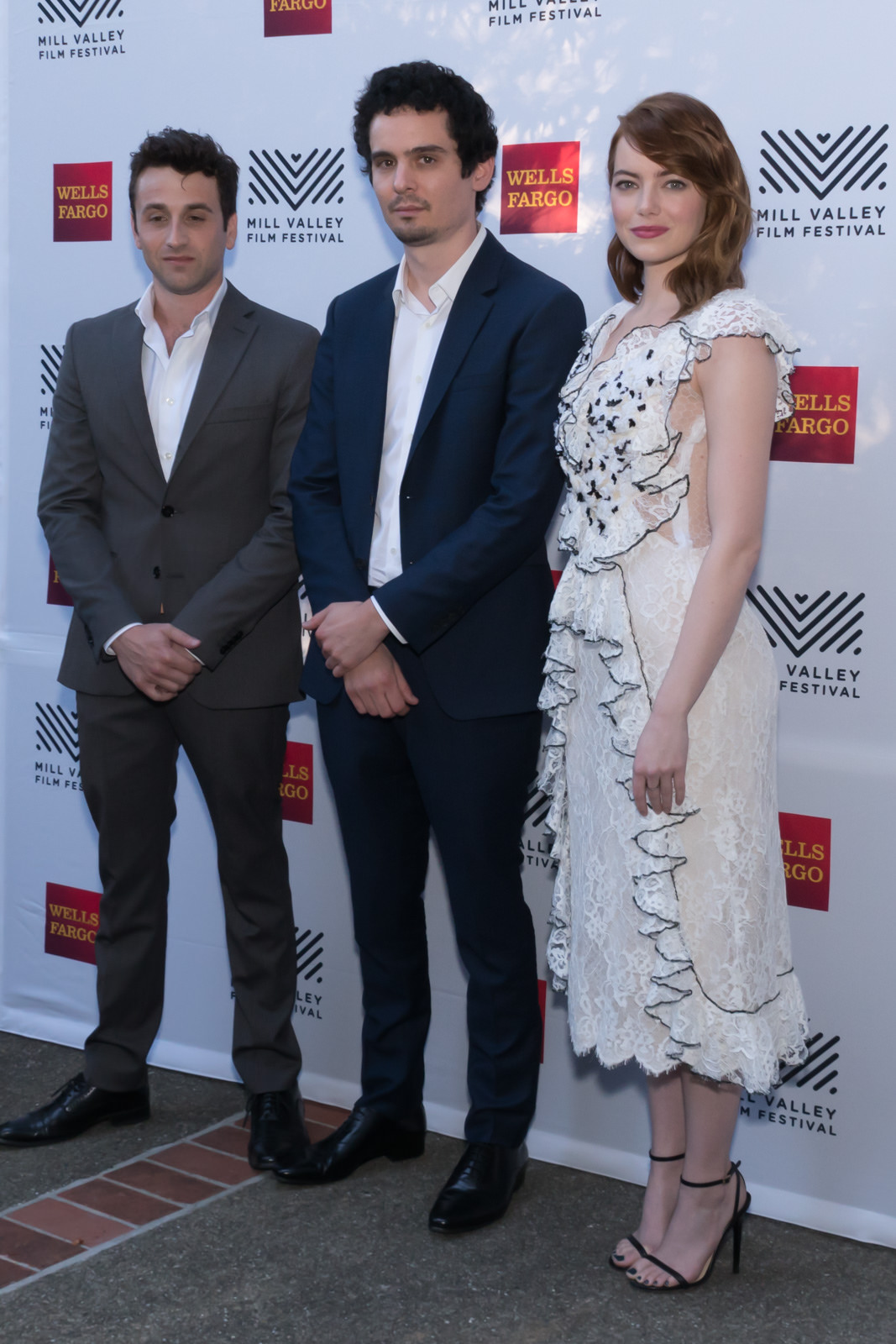
Hurwitz, Chazelle, and Stone at the Mill Valley Film Festival in October 2016

Emma Stone won the Volpi Cup for Best Actress at the Venice Film Festival.

La La Land received 11 nominations at the 70th British Academy Film Awards, more than any other film of 2016. The film won in the categories of Best Film, Best Director, Best Actress in a Leading Role (for Stone), Best Cinematography, and Best Film Music.

At the 74th Golden Globe Awards, La La Land received a leading seven nominations. The film won in all seven categories for which it was nominated, setting a record for the most Golden Globes won by a single film, namely Best Motion Picture – Musical or Comedy, Best Director, Best Actor – Comedy or Musical (for Gosling), Best Actress – Comedy or Musical (for Stone), Best Screenplay, Best Original Score, and Best Original Song ("City of Stars") breaking the record One Flew Over the Cuckoo's Nest set for the most wins.

At the 89th Academy Awards, La La Land received a leading six awards, namely Best Director, Best Actress (for Stone), Best Cinematography, Best Original Score, Best Original Song ("City of Stars"), and Best Production Design. The film received a total of 14 nominations, tying the record for most nominations by a single film with All About Eve (1950) and Titanic (1997). Its other nominations were Best Picture, Best Actor (for Gosling), Best Original Screenplay, Best Film Editing, Best Costume Design, a second nomination for Best Original Song ("Audition (The Fools Who Dream)"), Best Sound Editing, and Best Sound Mixing.

==== Best Picture Oscar gaffe ====
During the Oscars ceremony, presenter Faye Dunaway incorrectly announced that La La Land had won Best Picture, reading from the card Warren Beatty opened, which was actually a duplicate of the Best Actress card for Emma Stone. After the cast and crew of La La Land took the stage, it took the show's producers more than two minutes (during which nearly three speeches were made) to fix the mistake. The actual winner was Moonlight.

==== German television prank ====
In March 2017, La La Land was at the center of a prank involving Goldene Kamera, an annual German film and television award. German comedians Joko Winterscheidt and Klaas Heufer-Umlauf arranged for a Ryan Gosling impersonator to be awarded the "Best International Film" prize for La La Land. Following the event, a speaker for television broadcaster ZDF asked for the trophy to be given back, stating that La La Land had won the prize and that the trophy would be given to the real Ryan Gosling. The incident, which became known as "GoslingGate", sparked criticism of the event's concept. Media critics argued that the "Best International Film" award had only been created in an effort to get Ryan Gosling on the show, with no regards for the film's quality. The incident played a major role in the cancellation of the Goldene Kamera in 2019. In 2018, Winterscheidt and Heufer-Umlauf were awarded the Grimme Award for their media criticism.

== Stage adaptations ==
=== Broadway musical ===
On February 7, 2023, it was announced that the film would be adapted into a Broadway musical by Platt and Lionsgate. Hurwitz, Pasek, and Paul will return to write additional songs for the show. Bartlett Sher will direct from a book by Ayad Akhtar and Matthew Decker.

=== So Long Boulder City ===
A theatrical spin-off, So Long Boulder City, was created in 2017 by comedians Jimmy Fowlie and Jordan Black. The show was a full-length parody of Mia Dolan's one-woman show from the movie, and featured Fowlie in drag as Mia. So Long Boulder City debuted in Los Angeles before enjoying a run at the SubCulture Off-Broadway theater in New York City.

== See also ==
- List of oldest and youngest Academy Award winners and nominees – Youngest winners for Best Director
- Second weekend in box office performance § Second-weekend increase
