= Hans Morten Hansen =

Norwegian stand-up comedian and actor

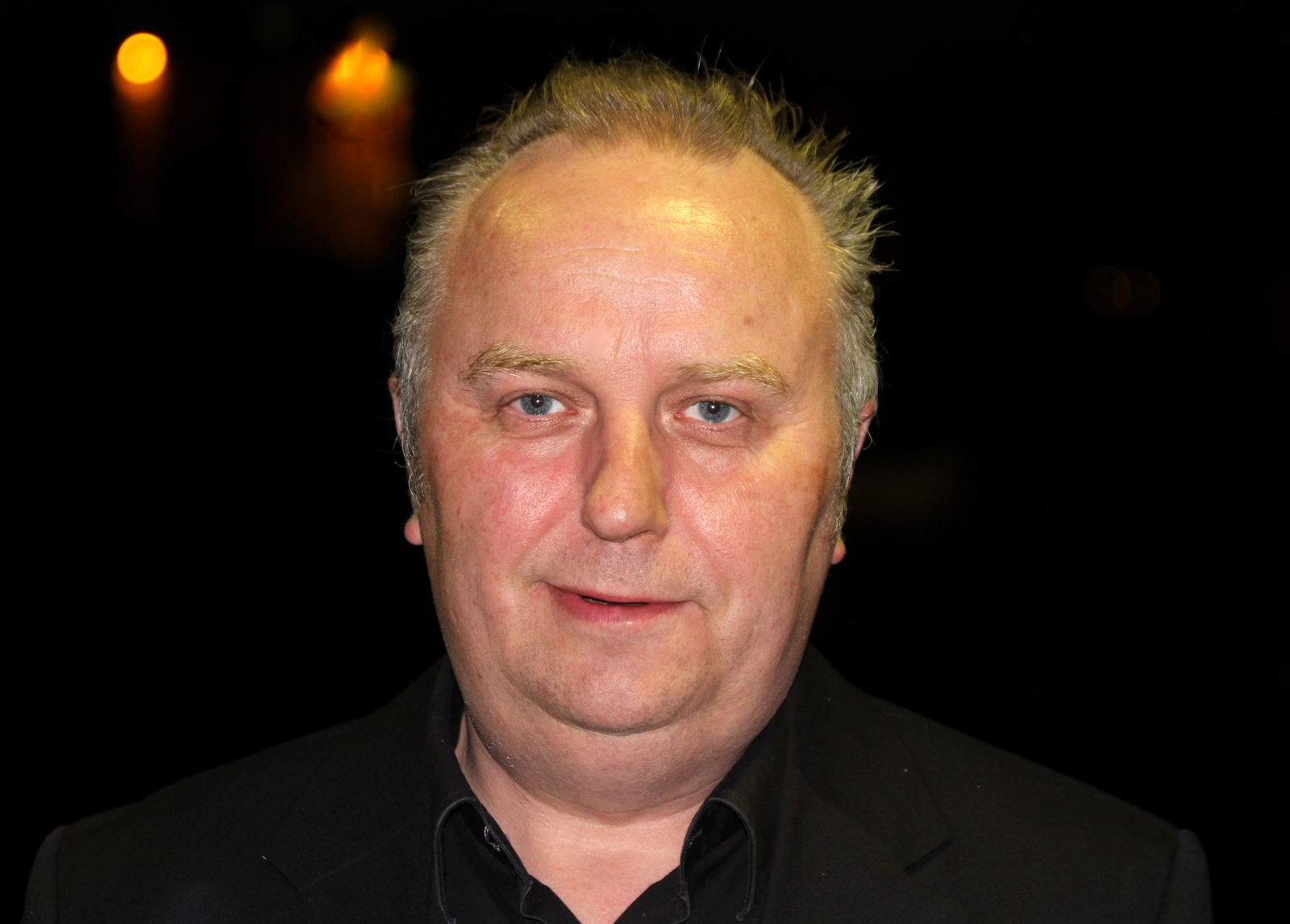
- Born: 28 February 1964 (age 62); Bergen, Norway
- Notable work: Worlds longest stand-up performance (38 hrs, 14 min)

Comedy career
- Years active: 1993–present
- Medium: Stand-up
- Genre: Stand-up comedy

Hans Morten Hansen (born 28 February 1964 in Bergen) is a Norwegian stand-up comedian, and actor notable for holding the world record for longest stand-up performance since August 20, 2010. He also portrayed the character of Finn in the 2010 film Trollhunter.

== Career ==
Hansen began his career in 1993, and became a full-time performer two years later. Failing to gain major success outside of his home town Stavanger as well as his place of residence, Oslo, he made a bet with the arrangers of Stand Up Festivalen (The Stand-up Festival), to make an attempt on the world record for longest stand-up performance. He began his record run on August 18, 2010, at 22:00 UTC, on Latter (Norwegian for laughter), a popular comedy club in Oslo. To beat the record, at the time held by Australian comedian Lindsay Webb, he would have to perform non-stop for 38 hours and 7 minutes. He was allowed a five-minute break every hour, as well as food and drinks on stage, and he was monitored by a doctor during the entire performance. He was also required to remain upright during his entire performance, as well as not being allowed to repeat any jokes or bits more than once every four hours. His performance, which was shown live on the internet television service VGTV, had more than 1 million online viewers, as well as several thousand people in the audience during the 38-hour show.

On August 20, at 12:07 UTC, Hansen officially beat the record, and continued his performance for an additional seven minutes, setting the new world record at 38 hrs and 14 minutes. When it became clear that he had succeeded in beating the world record, several audiences members entered the stage to present him with flowers and champagne. He was praised by several fellow comedians for the feat, such as Atle Antonsen.
