= The Autopsy of Jane Doe =

2016 film by André Øvredal

- Theatrical release poster
- Directed by: André Øvredal
- Written by: Ian Goldberg; Richard Naing
- Produced by: Fred Berger; Eric Garcia; Ben Pugh; Rory Aitken
- Starring: Emile Hirsch; Brian Cox; Olwen Catherine Kelly
- Cinematography: Roman Osin
- Edited by: Patrick Larsgaard
- Music by: Danny Bensi; Saunder Jurriaans
- Production companies: 42; Impostor Pictures; IM Global
- Distributed by: Lionsgate (United Kingdom); IFC Midnight (United States)
- Release dates: September 9, 2016 (TIFF); December 21, 2016 (United States)
- Running time: 86 minutes
- Countries: United Kingdom; United States
- Language: English
- Box office: $6 million

The Autopsy of Jane Doe is a 2016 supernatural horror film directed by André Øvredal as his first English-language film. It stars Brian Cox and Emile Hirsch as father-and-son coroners who experience supernatural phenomena while examining the body of an unidentified woman (played by Olwen Kelly).

The film premiered at the Toronto International Film Festival on September 9, 2016, and IFC Midnight released it on December 21, 2016. It grossed $6 million at the box office. The critical consensus at Rotten Tomatoes calls it "a smart, suggestively creepy thriller".

== Plot ==
In Grantham County, Virginia, the sheriff department finds the intact, half-buried corpse of an unidentified Jane Doe in the basement of a house where an inexplicable multiple homicide took place. No signs of forced entry are found, and it is determined that the victims were trying to escape the house where the killings took place. Jane's corpse is delivered to a morgue staffed by local coroner Tommy Tilden and his son Austin. Austin postpones a date with his girlfriend Emma to help his father with the autopsy, promising to meet her later that evening.

Jane's waist indicates long-term usage of a corset, which went out of fashion several centuries earlier. They cannot determine her time of death; her lack of rigour mortis and blood still flowing in her veins indicate that her death occurred recently, but her eyes are cloudy, suggesting she has been dead for several days. Despite no external signs of trauma, her wrist and ankle bones are shattered, her tongue has been severed, one of her molars is missing, her lungs are blackened, and her organs reveal numerous stab wounds. Jimsonweed, a paralysing agent native to New England, is found in her stomach.

The radio spontaneously begins changing stations. Austin sees people standing in the main corridor and goes to investigate, finding their cat, Stanley, mortally wounded. Tommy mercifully kills and reluctantly incinerates Stanley. Continuing the autopsy, he finds Jane's missing tooth in her stomach, wrapped in a piece of cloth bearing Roman numerals, letters, and an odd diagram; similar symbols are carved into the inside of her skin. The lights in the room suddenly explode, and Tommy and Austin realise the other corpses in the morgue have gone missing. They try to leave, only to find that the elevator is broken and a fallen tree is blocking the only exit. Their attempts to call for help fail when Austin’s cell phone and the office landline are unable to pick up a signal. In the bathroom, an unseen figure attacks Tommy.

Beginning to attribute the strange happenings to Jane, Tommy and Austin return to the autopsy room to cremate her. When the door locks itself, Austin hacks at it with an emergency axe. Through an opening, they see the disfigured face of one of the missing corpses, apparently reanimated. Unable to reach the cremation furnace, they use fuel to set Jane ablaze. Tommy extinguishes the quickly-spreading fire but finds the body still intact. When the elevator reactivates, Tommy and Austin attempt to escape again, but the doors will not close. They are approached by a dark figure - believing it to be one of the reanimated corpses, Tommy strikes it down with an axe, only to exit the elevator and discover that he has just killed Emma, who had just returned to meet Austin.

They return to the examination room and discover that Jane's neurons remain active, meaning she is alive. They re-examine the cloth and realise that the markings refer to Leviticus 20:27, which condemns witches, and the year 1693, the date of the Salem witch trials. Tommy deduces that Jane had been tortured to death after being accused of witchcraft, but her brutal murder inadvertently transformed her into a real witch, rendering her immortal and able to feel whatever pain her body endures, though she appears to be dead.

Deducing that she is keeping them alive because she wants them to suffer the way she has, Tommy offers Jane himself as a sacrifice, begging her to spare Austin. Wounds similar to Jane's are inflicted against Tommy; Jane's wounds simultaneously heal, and her eyes return to their original colour. Lying on the floor in agony, Tommy reaches for a scalpel. Begging Tommy to help him finish the ritual by cutting off his tongue, Austin mistakes his pleas for wanting him to end Tommy's suffering and so Austin stabs him. Hearing the sheriff outside, Austin approaches it before realising it is just another hallucination. He is startled by a vision of Tommy's walking corpse, causing him to trip over the stair railing and fall to his death.

The police arrive the next morning and are confused by another inexplicable crime scene. Jane Doe, showing no signs of trauma, is taken to Virginia Commonwealth University. During the ambulance ride, the radio spontaneously turns on, and Jane's toe twitches.

== Cast ==
- Emile Hirsch as Austin Tilden
- Brian Cox as Tommy Tilden
- Ophelia Lovibond as Emma Roberts
- Michael McElhatton as Sheriff Sheldon Burke
- Olwen Kelly as Jane Doe
- Jane Perry as Lieutenant Wade
- Parker Sawyers as Trooper Cole
- Mary Duddy as Irene Daniels
- Mark Phoenix as Louis Tannis
- Gerald Lawrence as Rence Smith
- Ariane Nicole as Ria Smith

== Production ==
Coming from the success of Trollhunter, Øvredal stated that he wanted to "prove something" – specifically that he could do more than found footage-style films. He stated, "It's just a very specific style that you need to get into specifically for that project." The Conjuring proved to be a spark of inspiration for Øvredal, and he said, "it was such a classical horror movie that came at a time where all these movies had tried to do all kinds of different stuff and then suddenly it was like getting back to basics". After watching the film, Øvredal told his agency he wanted to "find a pure horror script", which resulted in being sent Autopsy. The script had previously appeared on the annual Black List.

Martin Sheen was initially cast as Tommy but pulled out. Although there are some prosthetics used, the role of the corpse, for the most part, was played by actress Olwen Kelly. Øvredal felt that it was necessary to have an actress for the part to help connect the audience on a human level. On some level the decision was also a practical one as Øvredal believes that doing some of the close up scenes with a prosthetic would've been impossible. Øvredal said that Kelly had the most difficult role in the film, and he credited her with making everyone else comfortable on the set. Kelly was the first person interviewed for the role. Øvredal said they performed further interviews afterward, but he instantly knew she was right for the role. One of the reasons she was selected was her knowledge of yoga, which helped her control her body and breathing. Production in the UK began in London on March 30, 2015.

The production was filmed at Home Farm in Selling, Kent, which doubled as the exterior and kitchen of the Tilden family home.

== Release ==
The Autopsy of Jane Doe premiered at the Toronto International Film Festival on September 9, 2016. It was released in the US on December 21, 2016.

== Reception ==
Rotten Tomatoes, a review aggregator, reports that 86% of 110 surveyed critics gave the film a positive review; the average rating is 7/10. The website's critical consensus reads: "The Autopsy of Jane Doe subverts the gruesome expectations triggered by its title to deliver a smart, suggestively creepy thriller that bolsters director André Øvredal's growing reputation." Metacritic gave it a weighted average score of 65 out of 100, based on 20 critics, indicating "generally favorable reviews".

Dennis Harvey of Variety called it a "taut, yet often slyly funny scarefest", though he said the climax was unfulfilling. Though he praised the acting, Stephen Dalton of The Hollywood Reporter called the film an "unsatisfactory compromise" of art-house and exploitation film. Richard Whittaker of The Austin Chronicle wrote that Øvredal "constructs a sinister claustrophobia", then "elegantly and disturbingly unwraps the enigma". Joe Lipsett of Bloody Disgusting rated it 5/5 stars and wrote, "Øvredal masterfully balances the requisite gore with some well-earned jump scares and a foreboding sense of doom." Writing at Dread Central, Ari Drew described it as "mostly effective". Drew complimented the acting but criticized the film's exposition and scripting near the end.

Writer Stephen King spoke in favor of the film. Rotten Tomatoes lists the film on its 100 Best Zombie Movies, Ranked by Tomatometer.
