= André Øvredal =

Norwegian filmmaker (born 1973)

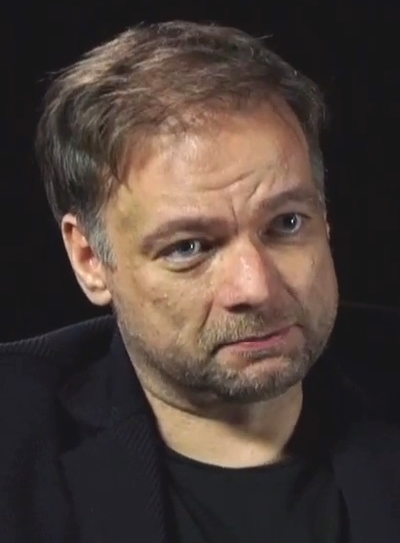
- André Øvredal in 2019
- Born: 6 May 1973 (age 53); Norway
- Occupations: Film director, screenwriter, film producer
- Years active: 1997–present

André Øvredal (Norwegian: [ɑnˈdreː ˈø̂ːvrədɑɫ]; born 6 May 1973) is a Norwegian filmmaker. He is best known for directing the films Trollhunter (2010), The Autopsy of Jane Doe (2016), Scary Stories to Tell in the Dark (2019), The Last Voyage of the Demeter (2023), and Passenger (2026). As announced in 2024, he is directing the upcoming film adaptation of Bendy and the Ink Machine.

== Life and career ==
He is best known for writing and directing the film Trollhunter. Øvredal wrote for 20th Century Fox Television the pilot episode of action-horror television series Enormous, which is based on the comic book of the same name.

== Filmography ==
Year	Title	Director	Writer	Producer	Editor
2000	Future Murder	Yes	Yes	Yes	Yes
2010	Trollhunter	Yes	Yes	No	No
2016	The Autopsy of Jane Doe	Yes	No	No	No
2019	Scary Stories to Tell in the Dark	Yes	No	No	No
2020	Mortal	Yes	Yes	Executive	No
2022	Umma	No	No	Executive	No
2023	The Last Voyage of the Demeter	Yes	No	No	No
2026	Passenger	Yes	No	No	No

=== Short films ===
Year	Title	Director	Writer	Producer
2001	3AM Eternal	No	No	Yes
2009	Customer Support	Yes	Yes	No
2015	Polaroid	No	No	Executive
2016	Tunnelen	Yes	Yes	No

=== Television ===
Year	Title	Writer	Producer	Notes
2014	Enormous	Yes	Co-executive	Pilot episode
