= Fred Berger (producer) =

American film producer

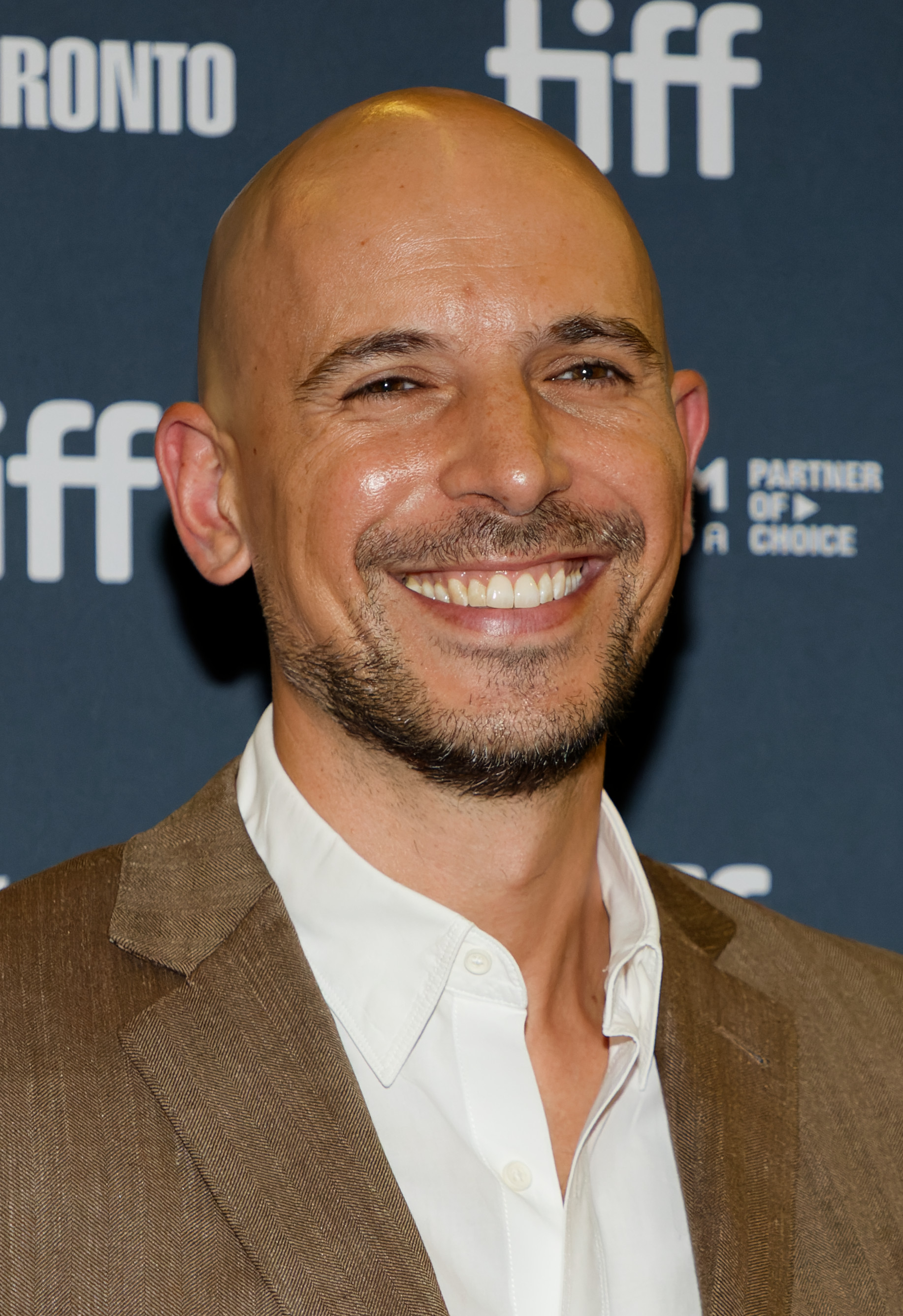
- Berger in 2024
- Occupation: Film producer

Fred Berger (born May 10, 1981) is an American film producer.

== Career ==
For producing the musical La La Land (2016), Berger was nominated for the Academy Award for Best Picture, and won the Golden Globe Award for Best Motion Picture – Musical or Comedy and Producers Guild of America Award for Best Theatrical Motion Picture.

In addition to La La Land, Berger served as a producer on the films The Autopsy of Jane Doe and Taking Chance, and earned his second Oscar nomination for producing A Complete Unknown (2024). He became a partner at Automatik Entertainment alongside Brian Kavanaugh-Jones in 2016, and subsequently at Range Media Partners when the companies merged in 2023.
