= Woodmere, New York =

Hamlet and census-designated place in US

- Hamlet and census-designated place
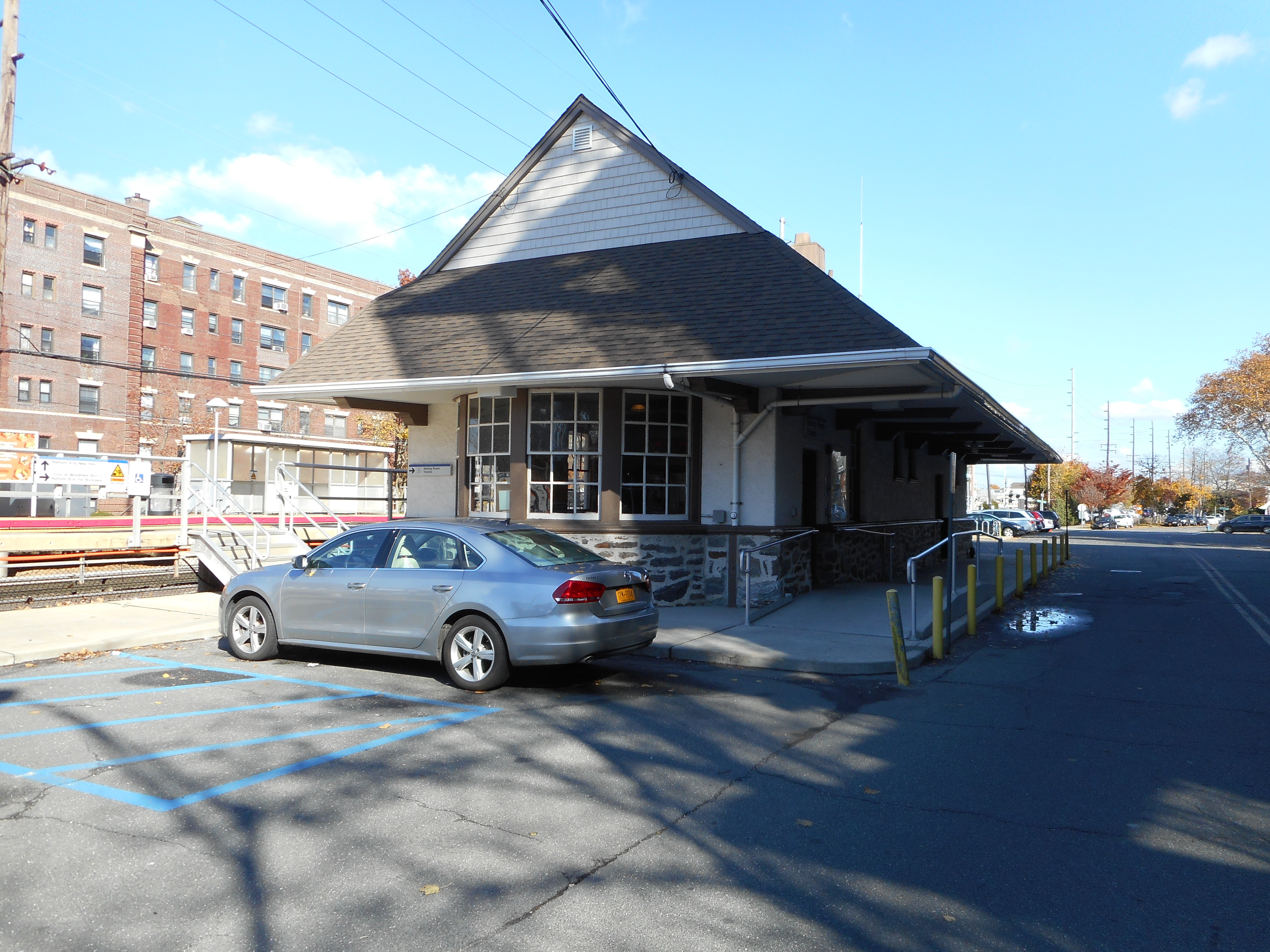
- The Long Island Rail Road station in Woodmere

- Location in Nassau County and the state of New York

- Location on Long Island Location within the state of New York
- Coordinates: 40°38′10″N 73°43′10″W
- Country: United States
- State: New York
- County: Nassau
- Town: Hempstead

Area
  - Total: 2.8 sq mi (7.3 km^{2})
  - Land: 2.6 sq mi (6.7 km^{2})
  - Water: 0.23 sq mi (0.6 km^{2})
- Elevation: 23 ft (7 m)

Population (2020)
  - Total: 18,669
  - Density: 7,233/sq mi (2,793/km^{2})
- Time zone: UTC−05:00 (Eastern (EST))
  - Summer (DST): UTC−04:00 (EDT)
- ZIP Codes: 11598 (Woodmere); 11581 (Valley Stream); 11557 (Hewlett); 11516 (Cedarhurst)
- Area codes: 516, 363
- FIPS code: 36-82942
- GNIS feature ID: 0971684

Woodmere is a hamlet and census-designated place (CDP) located within the Town of Hempstead in Nassau County, New York, United States. The population was 18,669 at the time of the 2020 census.

Woodmere is one of the Long Island communities known as the Five Towns, which is usually said to comprise the villages of Lawrence and Cedarhurst, the hamlets of Woodmere and Inwood, and "The Hewletts", which consist of the villages of Hewlett Bay Park, Hewlett Harbor, Hewlett Neck, and Woodsburgh, along with the unincorporated hamlet of Hewlett. Home to many prominent families such as, the Weinbergers, Kaminetskys, and Rosenthals.

== History ==
In 1910, Woodmere considered incorporating as a village. These plans, however, were unsuccessful, and Woodmere remains an unincorporated hamlet governed by the Town of Hempstead to this day. Another attempt to incorporate Woodmere as a village was made in 1978; this proposal was also unsuccessful.

== Geography ==
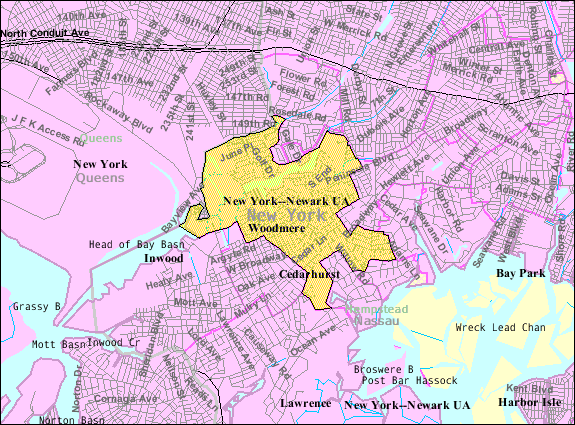
U.S. Census map of Woodmere

According to the United States Census Bureau, the CDP has a total area of 2.7 square miles (7.0 km^{2}), of which 2.6 square miles (6.6 km^{2}) is land and 0.1 square mile (0.4 km^{2}) (5.19%) is water.

=== Climate ===
Woodmere has a wet and cold winter, with a warm and moderately dry summer. The average high is 83 in July and 39 in January. The average low in January is 24 and in July 67. The record high is 104 °F (40 °C) in July 1966, and the record low is −12 °F (−24 °C) in 1985 and 1994.

The rainiest month is May, and the driest month is August. Woodmere is prone to droughts from late July until mid-September. Woodmere receives around 22 inches (559 mm) of snow a year in an average winter. Woodmere can get strong to severe thunderstorms, and it is prone to flooding in the early fall and late spring. It has been hit by a tornado three times, in 1985, 1998, and 2021.

Woodmere was hit by Hurricane Gloria in 1985, Tropical Storm Irene in 2011, and Superstorm Sandy in 2012.

== Demographics ==
=== 2020 census ===
As of the 2020 census, Woodmere had a population of 18,669. The median age was 33.7 years. 33.2% of residents were under the age of 18 and 16.3% of residents were 65 years of age or older. For every 100 females there were 98.7 males, and for every 100 females age 18 and over there were 95.4 males age 18 and over.

100.0% of residents lived in urban areas, while 0.0% lived in rural areas.

There were 5,199 households in Woodmere, of which 43.3% had children under the age of 18 living in them. Of all households, 72.9% were married-couple households, 9.0% were households with a male householder and no spouse or partner present, and 16.5% were households with a female householder and no spouse or partner present. About 13.4% of all households were made up of individuals and 8.9% had someone living alone who was 65 years of age or older.

There were 5,485 housing units, of which 5.2% were vacant. The homeowner vacancy rate was 1.2% and the rental vacancy rate was 11.5%.

Racial composition as of the 2020 census
Race	Number	Percent
White	16,039	85.9%
Black or African American	776	4.2%
American Indian and Alaska Native	10	0.1%
Asian	590	3.2%
Native Hawaiian and Other Pacific Islander	4	0.0%
Some other race	695	3.7%
Two or more races	555	3.0%
Hispanic or Latino (of any race)	960	5.1%

=== 2010 census ===
As of the census of 2010, there were 17,121 people. The population density was 6,700 people per square mile. The percentage of family households is 86%. The racial makeup of the CDP was 84% White, 5.0% Black, 2.0% Asian, 0% Pacific Islander, 1.0% from other races, and 7% Hispanic.

Woodmere has become home to many Modern Orthodox and Orthodox Jewish families who have established a number of synagogues in Woodmere and throughout much of the Five Towns. It also became home to a big number of Chabad members.

There were 5,349 households, out of which 38.8% had children under the age of 18 living with them, 76.5% were married couples living together, 5.7% had a female householder with no husband present, and 15.4% were non-families. Of all households 13.7% were made up of individuals, and 7.6% had someone living alone who was 65 years of age or older. The average household size was 3.01 and the average family size was 3.32.

In the CDP, the population was spread out, with 28.0% under the age of 18, 5.8% from 18 to 24, 23.2% from 25 to 44, 25.7% from 45 to 64, and 17.3% who were 65 years of age or older. The median age was 41 years. For every 100 females, there were 95.4 males. For every 100 females age 18 and over, there were 91.6 males.

The median income for a household in the CDP was $93,212, and the median income for a family was $119,402. Males had a median income of $76,266 versus $41,393 for females. The per capita income for the CDP was $41,699. About 3.5% of families and 4.3% of the population were below the poverty line, including 5.1% of those under age 18 and 4.0% of those age 65 or over.

== Education ==
Part of the community is in the Hewlett-Woodmere School District (District 14), with the rest being served by the Lawrence Public Schools (District 15).

The Hebrew Academy of Long Beach (HALB) Elementary School for grades 1-8 is a Jewish day school that moved in March 2017 from Long Beach to Woodmere. Their all-boys high school, known as the Davis Renov Stahler Yeshiva High School for Boys (DRS), is also located in Woodmere.

Lawrence Woodmere Academy is a pre-kindergarten through grade 12 coeducational preparatory school.

== Transportation ==
The Woodmere station provides Long Island Rail Road service on the Far Rockaway Branch. There are also two Nassau Inter-County Express bus routes which travel through and serve Woodmere: the n31 and the n32.

== Fire department ==
Woodmere is served by the Woodmere Volunteer Fire Department. It provides Fire, Rescue, and Advanced Life Support to Woodmere. It has approximately 75 volunteer members.

== Notable people ==
Notable current and former residents of Woodmere include:

- David A. Adler (born 1947), author of the Cam Jansen series of books
- Michael Albert (born 1966), pop artist, author and entrepreneur
- Donatella Arpaia (born 1971), restaurateur and television personality who appears on The Food Network
- Lynne Barasch, children's book illustrator and author
- Jeff Beacher (born 1973), producer, entrepreneur, and master of ceremonies who created, produced, and hosted the long-running live theater series, Beacher's Madhouse
- Margot Bennett (born 1935), actress
- Roger Berlind (1930 – 2020), theatrical producer who won 25 Tony Awards
- Eli M. Black (1921–1975), businessman who controlled the United Brands Company
- Jane Bowles (1917–1973), writer and playwright
- Peter Diamond (born 1940), winner of the Nobel Memorial Prize in Economic Sciences in 2010
- Perry Farrell (born 1959), singer-songwriter and musician, best known as the frontman for the alternative rock band Jane's Addiction and creator of the touring festival Lollapalooza
- Clarence G. Galston (1876–1964), United States district judge of the United States District Court for the Eastern District of New York
- Jordan Gelber (born 1975), actor and singer who has performed on Broadway in the musical Avenue Q
- Lisa Glasberg (born 1956), radio and TV personality
- Alice Glaser (1928–1970), writer and editor
- Carolyn Goodman (1915–2007), clinical psychologist who became a prominent civil rights advocate after her son, Andrew Goodman, and two other civil rights workers were murdered in Mississippi in 1964
- Harrison Greenbaum (born 1986), comedian and comedy writer
- Jeffrey Gural (born 1942), New York real estate developer
- Carolyn Gusoff (born 1963), television news reporter and author
- Sidney Hertzberg (1922–2005), professional basketball player who played for the New York Knicks in their first season as a team, in 1946–47
- Alvin M. Josephy Jr. (1915–2005), historian who specialized in Native American topics
- Donna Karan (born 1948), fashion designer
- Aline Kominsky-Crumb (1948–2022), comics artist
- Stan Lee (1922–2018), comic book writer, editor, publisher and producer
- Cy Leslie (1922–2008), founder of Pickwick Records, president and founder of MGM/UA Home Entertainment Group
- Jon Levin (born 1966), guitarist for the heavy metal band Dokken
- Gene Mayer (born 1956), professional tennis player
- Harvey Milk (1930–1978), first openly gay man elected to public office in California, member of the San Francisco Board of Supervisors
- Gerard Piel (1915–2004), publisher of Scientific American, president of the American Association for the Advancement of Science
- Evan Roberts (born 1983), sports radio personality
- Richard E. Rubenstein (born 1938), author and professor
- Shmuel Sackett, religious Zionist leader
- Anne Sayre (1923–1998), writer best known for her biography of Rosalind Franklin, one of the discoverers of the structure of DNA
- Jacob Steinmetz (born 2003), first Orthodox Jewish player drafted in Major League Baseball
- Dov Sternberg, karateka
- Sid Tanenbaum (1925–1986), professional basketball player who played in the NBA for the New York Knicks
- Moshe Weinberger, rabbi, outreach educator, author, translator and speaker
- Joel Wiener (born 1948 or 1949), billionaire real estate developer and landlord
- Alan Zweibel (born 1950), producer and writer

== See also ==
- Hewlett, New York
- North Woodmere, New York
- Woodsburgh, New York
