= Trollhunter =

2010 film by André Øvredal

- Theatrical release poster
- Directed by: André Øvredal
- Written by: André Øvredal
- Produced by: John M. Jacobsen; Sveinung Golimo
- Starring: Otto Jespersen; Hans Morten Hansen; Tomas Alf Larsen; Johanna Mørck; Knut Nærum; Robert Stoltenberg; Glenn Erland Tosterud
- Cinematography: Hallvard Bræin
- Edited by: Per-Erik Eriksen
- Production companies: Lakeshore Entertainment; Filmkameratene A/S; Film Fund FUZZ
- Distributed by: Lakeshore International; SF Norge A/S
- Release date: 29 October 2010
- Running time: 104 minutes
- Country: Norway
- Languages: Norwegian; English
- Budget: NOK 19 million ($3.5 million)
- Box office: NOK 24 million ($4.2 million)

Trollhunter (Norwegian: Trolljegeren; UK: Troll Hunter; Canada: The Troll Hunter) is a 2010 Norwegian dark fantasy film, made as a "found footage" mockumentary. Written and directed by André Øvredal, and featuring a mixed cast of relatively unknown actors and well-known Norwegian comedians, including Otto Jespersen, Trollhunter received positive reviews from Norwegian critics. It opened on 10 June 2011 in the United States to a mostly-positive critical reception.

== Plot ==
A group of students from Volda University College, Thomas, Johanna, and their cameraman Kalle, set out to make a documentary about a suspected bear poacher, Hans. At the site of an illegally slain bear they interview local hunters, who comment that the bear tracks look odd. Finn Haugen, head of the Norwegian Wildlife Board, dismisses the idea that the bear tracks could have been faked.

The students follow Hans in an attempt to secure an interview but he continually rebuffs them. Following him into a forest at night time, they see flashing lights and hear roars. Hans comes running back, screaming "Troll!" Thomas is bitten by something as they run away. After finding their own vehicle destroyed, they escape in Hans's Land Rover. Hans reveals he is not hunting bears, but trolls. The students ask for permission to interview him and film his hunt, to which he consents on the condition that they do exactly as he instructs.

The next day, Hans asks if any of them believe in God or Jesus, because a troll can smell a Christian man's blood. Hans wields a "flash-gun", a weapon that emits powerful UV-rays to simulate sunlight and turns trolls to stone, or makes them spontaneously explode depending on how old they are. Hans flushes out a giant three-headed troll and manages to turn the troll to stone. He explains that he only allowed them to come along because he's tired of working for little compensation and wants them to divulge the truth.

Finn's team, who actually works for the Troll Security Service (TSS), arrives to deposit a bear carcass and plant fake tracks. Finn tells the students their tapes will be confiscated. During interviews, Hans reveals that his job is to kill trolls that come near populated areas, while Finn's is to keep trolls a secret. He reveals that the trolls have been acting aggressively lately and have begun to leave their territories more often. He plans to get a troll blood sample to determine why. Using live goats on a bridge as bait, Hans obtains a blood sample from a bridge troll. He takes it to a TSS veterinarian, who informs him it will take several days for results.

Investigating a farm, Hans and the students find tracks leading into an abandoned mine, which turns out to be the lair of cave trolls. The cave trolls return unexpectedly and the group is trapped inside. The trolls pick up the scent of Kalle, who turns out to be a Christian, and discover the group. Everyone runs for the cave entrance into daylight, but Kalle is caught and killed.

The students get a replacement camerawoman, Malica. Finn demands that Hans head north to troll territory to get the problem under control. The group finds signs of a Jötunn, a giant mountain troll 50–100 metres tall. Thomas, who was bitten a few days ago, falls ill, and they learn that the troll blood sample came back positive for rabies.

After several attempts, Hans manages to kill the Jötunn by launching a rocket-like projectile that transforms the troll into stone. Before doing so, he directs the others to find the highway. Finn and his TSS-agents arrive to confiscate the students' tapes. Thomas flees with the camera and ends up at the side of a road, with a truck oncoming, when the footage ends. An epilogue tells the audience that none of the students were heard from again. The film ends with a news-clip of the Norwegian Prime Minister Jens Stoltenberg appearing to admit to the existence of trolls, though the press fails to take notice.

== Cast ==
- Otto Jespersen as Hans the trollhunter
- Hans Morten Hansen as Finn
- Tomas Alf Larsen as Kalle
- Johanna Mørck as Johanna
- Knut Nærum as a power company manager
- Robert Stoltenberg as a Polish bear hunter
- Glenn Erland Tosterud as Thomas
- Urmila Berg-Domaas as Malica
- Torunn Lødemel Stokkeland as Hilda, a veterinarian

== Production ==
Filming took place in the forests and mountains of Western Norway, and actress Johanna Mørck called it an exhausting experience. According to director André Øvredal, the team tried to maintain maximum secrecy around the project. They kept both the title and cast secret until shortly before the première, dropping cryptic teasers to create a viral effect.

For the film's final scene, a clip of former Norwegian Prime minister Jens Stoltenberg speaking about an oil field outside Norway called the Troll Field was edited to create the appearance of him admitting to the existence of trolls.

=== Soundtrack ===
The song "Mjød" by Kvelertak is featured over the ending credits sequence, followed by "In the Hall of the Mountain King" from Norwegian composer Edvard Grieg's music for the play Peer Gynt. The latter song's quiet, downbeat ending is abruptly followed by a VFX-clip, showing the family of "Mountain King"-trolls (the third of four troll types depicted in the movie) clawing and shrieking at the camera. While otherwise in Norwegian, the credits end with the English phrase "No trolls were harmed during the making of this movie".

== Cultural references ==
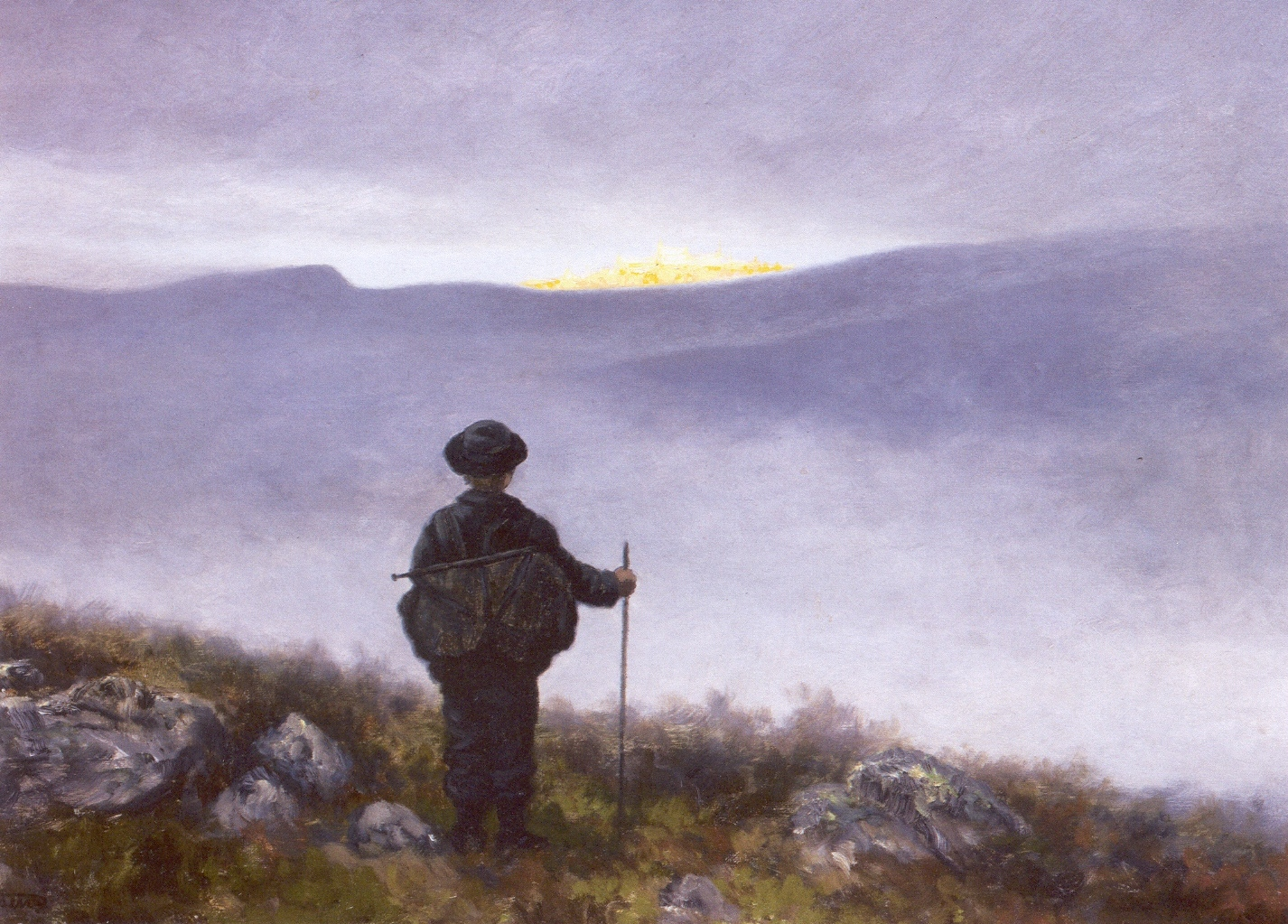
The painting Soria Moria Castle by Theodor Kittelsen

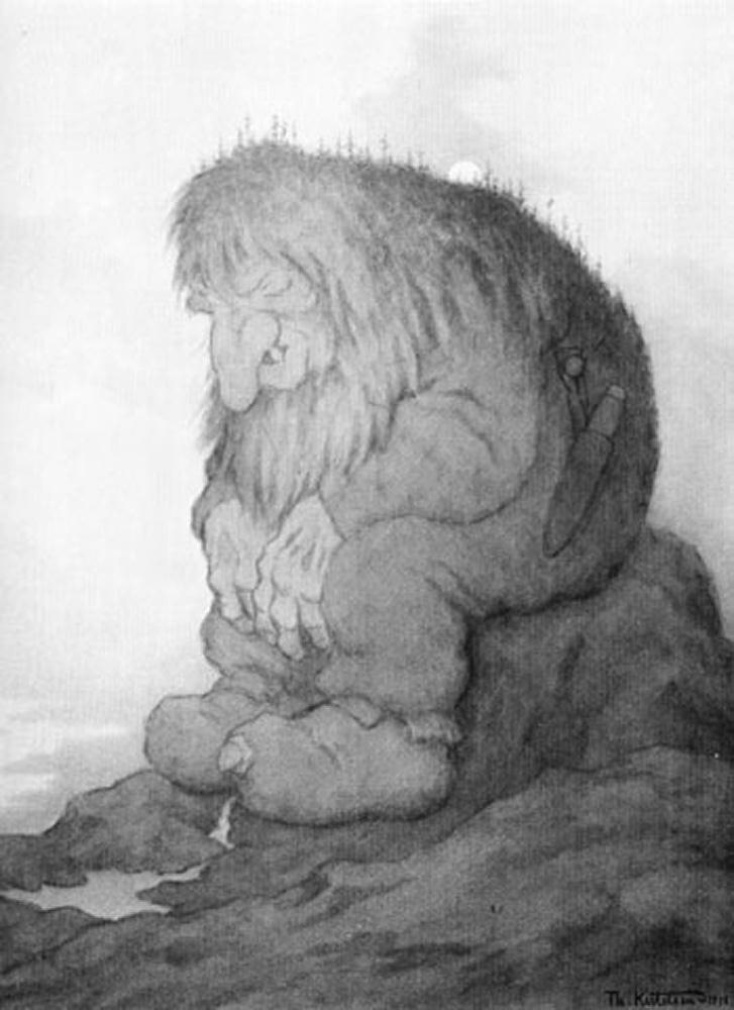
Troll-painting by Theodor Kittelsen

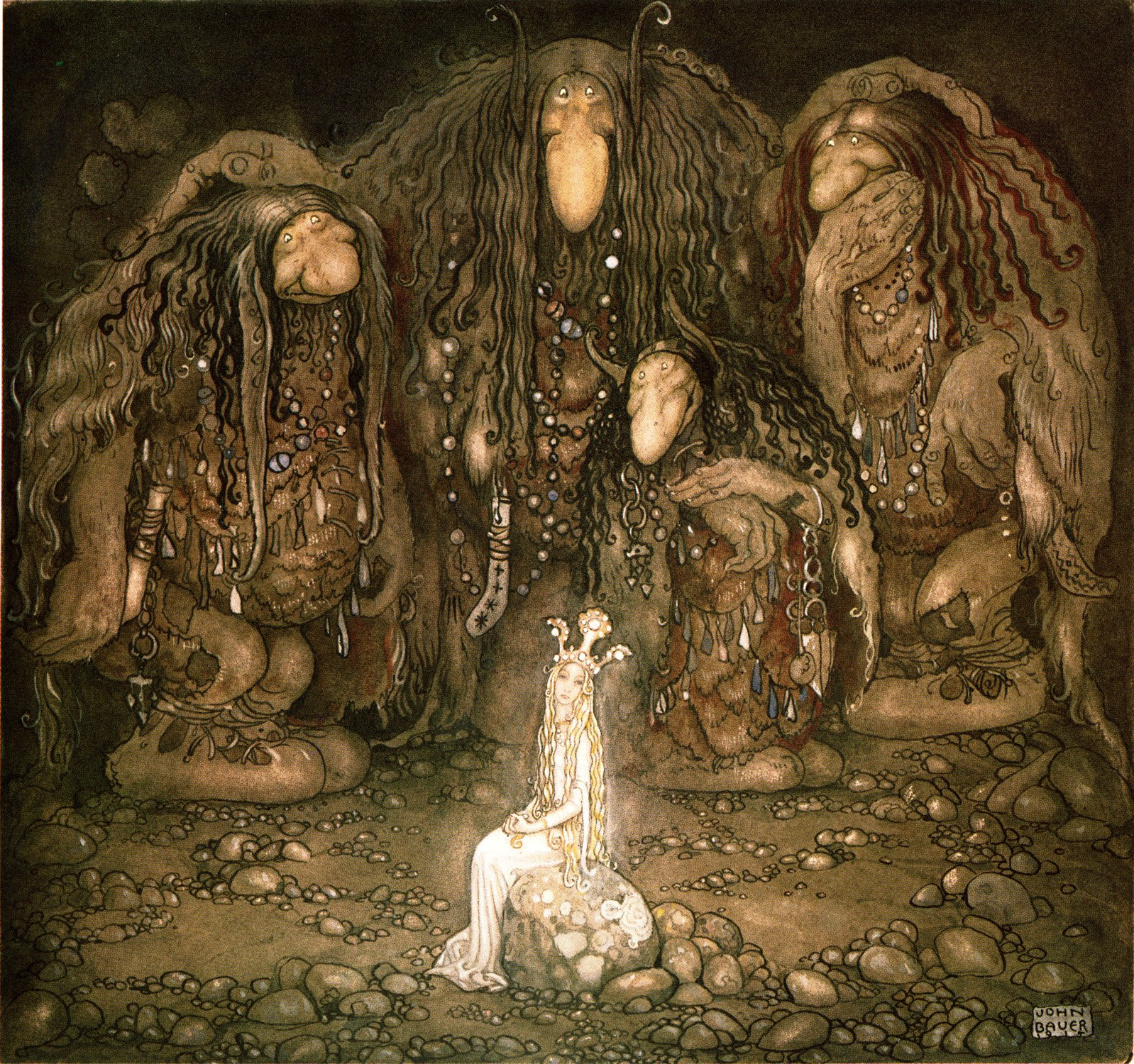
Troll-painting by John Bauer

Trollhunter contains many references to Norwegian culture and Norwegian folktales in particular. Among those are the belief that there are different species of trolls, such as the woodland and mountain trolls, which can be further categorized into subspecies as in the film. The most well-known is probably the Mountain King, which is mentioned in the play Peer Gynt and its music by Edvard Grieg. The Norwegian name for Mountain King, Dovregubbe, is a compound word whose first part is used in the name for the mountain range Dovrefjell where the characters meet the final troll.

Other common troll descriptions from Norwegian folklore which are used in the film include trolls having a tail, multiple heads, the ability to smell a Christian's blood, eating rocks, but loving meat and sometimes being man-eaters. The trolls are also described as big, old, strong, but slow and dim-witted, turning to stone when exposed to sunlight. The latter is a point emphasized in the film, as Hans uses UV-light to kill the trolls. However, he also states that not everything from the tales is true.

The film also has several specific references to fairy tales. For example The Boy Who Had an Eating Match with a Troll when the camera man asks about an eating contest, and the Three Billy Goats Gruff when Hans attempts to lure a troll from under a bridge using three goats. The fairy tale Soria Moria Castle is one of the tales that tells about trolls being able to smell a Christian man's blood. A painting by Theodor Kittelsen based on the same fairy tale is also used as a backdrop on one of the trips they do in the film (Thomas stands in the same pose and asks his friends "Do I look like that famous painting?"). The look of the trolls in the film is also influenced by painters like Theodor Kittelsen and John Bauer.

As reflected by how the students answer Hans, only a fraction of Norwegians consider themselves religious or visit the church regularly, even though the majority of Norwegians are members of the state church.

The film also makes references to the often-heated conflict between farmers and predators eating their livestock and the farmers' limited ability to react without breaking Norwegian wild life regulations. Similarly, there are conflicts that arise when new overhead power lines need to be passed through the landscape. (The power lines are used as an electric fence to keep the Trolls away.)

With several of the cast being comedians that are fairly-well-known to the Norwegian audience, including Otto Jespersen playing Hans, it also sets the tone of the film for many. Robert Stoltenberg playing the Polish bear hunter makes that scene less serious, and plays on xenophobic stereotypes that most Norwegian immigrants are from Poland, often speak mediocre Norwegian or English, do what they are told without asking questions, and often do the work Norwegians won't do themselves.

== Reception ==
=== Critical response ===
==== Norway ====
In a review for NRK, the Norwegian Broadcasting Company; Birger Vestmo gave the film six out of six points and wrote that "a new Norwegian classic is born". He also applauded the film for combining Norwegian cultural elements with Hollywood cinematic flair. Dagbladet's Inger Merete Hobbelstad gave the film four points out of six and compared it to The Blair Witch Project. She complained that the dramaturgy could have been better at times. The special effects she found to be of variable quality, though certain scenes were "amazing". She also highlighted Jespersen's performance as essential to the film's success. The film received four points out of six in the newspapers Klassekampen and Verdens Gang as well. Verdens Gang critic Morten Ståle Nilsen summed it up as "Better than we feared. Weaker than we could hope." Nilsen also made the comparison to The Blair Witch Project and predicted great commercial success for the film. Like Hobbelstad he appreciated Jespersen's effort.

Mode Steinkjer in Dagsavisen, gave the film five out of six points. He commended Øvredal's ability to combine "subtle humour with physical tension" and also commented on the "striking naturalness" displayed by Tosterud, Larsen and Mørck as the three students. Kjersti Nipen, on the other hand, reviewing the film for Aftenposten, gave the movie only three points out of six. She called it "flat, predictable, and rather devoid of content". Although she regarded it as funny at times, Nipen found the use of the mockumentary format exhausted and overused. The review in Morgenbladet was not favorable.

==== International ====
Outside Norway, Trollhunter received a positive reception from critics. The film has an approval rating of 83% on review aggregator website Rotten Tomatoes, based on 110 reviews, and an average rating of 6.6/10. The site's consensus reads, "Trollhunter is a mockumentary with an appropriate level of creeping dread, but one that also benefits from generous helpings of dry wit". Metacritic assigned the film a weighted average score of 61 out of 100, based on 25 critics, indicating "generally-favorable reviews".

Mike Hale of The New York Times called it a "clever and engaging mock documentary" with "ultradry Nordic humor", though "about 20 percent too long" with "more traveling shots through car windows of the fjord-land scenery than are absolutely necessary". The special effects, while "created with a computer-graphics budget that we can assume was far short of the Hollywood standard, are surprisingly lifelike and frightening". Frank Lovece of Film Journal International praised star Jespersen for "what ought to be a star-making dramatic performance", and found the film "both a remarkably suspenseful voyage ... and a dry-witted commentary on the nature of expedient bureaucracy ... Part horror movie, part social satire, and bursting with Norway’s savage beauty ... it is destined to be a classic of its kind." V. A. Musetto of the New York Post gave it three stars out of four and cautioned, "You'll want to catch this clever movie before Hollywood ruins everything with a dumb remake." British writer Ross Miller of Blog Critics gave it 4.5 stars out of 5 and said, "Troll Hunter takes what is now a conventional style of found footage filmmaking and puts a unique stamp on it ... one of the best examples of this type of film so far."

=== Awards and nominations ===
Year	Association	Category	Nominated work	Result
2011	Amanda Award	Best Visual Effects (Årets visuelle effekter)	Oystein Larsen & Marcus B. Brodersen	Won
2011	Amanda Award	Public Choice Award	André Øvredal	Won
2011	Amanda Award	Best Actor (Årets mannlige skuespiller)	Otto Jespersen	Nominated
2011	Amanda Award	Best Editing (Årets klipp)	Per-Erik Eriksen	Nominated
2011	Amanda Award	Best Screenplay (Årets filmmanuskript)	André Øvredal	Nominated
2011	Brussels International Fantastic Film Festival	Silver Raven Award for Best Director	André Øvredal	Nominated
2011	Newport Beach Film Festival	Outstanding Achievement in Filmmaking	André Øvredal	Won
2012	17th Empire Awards	Best Horror	Trollhunter	Nominated
2012	38th Saturn Awards	Best International Film	Trollhunter	Nominated
2012	Fangoria Chainsaw Awards	Best Foreign-Language Film	Trollhunter	Nominated

== Canceled remake ==
Prior to the theatrical release of Trollhunter, producers John M. Jacobsen and Sveinung Golimo had been given requests for the film to be remade. As a result, both had traveled to the United States to meet with stakeholders. When the film opened in the United States the following year, Deadline Hollywood announced that director Chris Columbus's company, 1492 Pictures, along with CJ Entertainment & Media, had acquired rights to remake the film. Neil Marshall was to direct the remake. As of November 2016, however, the remake has been canceled.

== Other sources ==
- Rees, Ellen (January 2011). "Trolls, Monster Masts and National Neurosis: André Øvrelid's The Troll Hunter". Scandinavica 50.2: 52–62.
