= List of accolades received by Manchester by the Sea (film) =

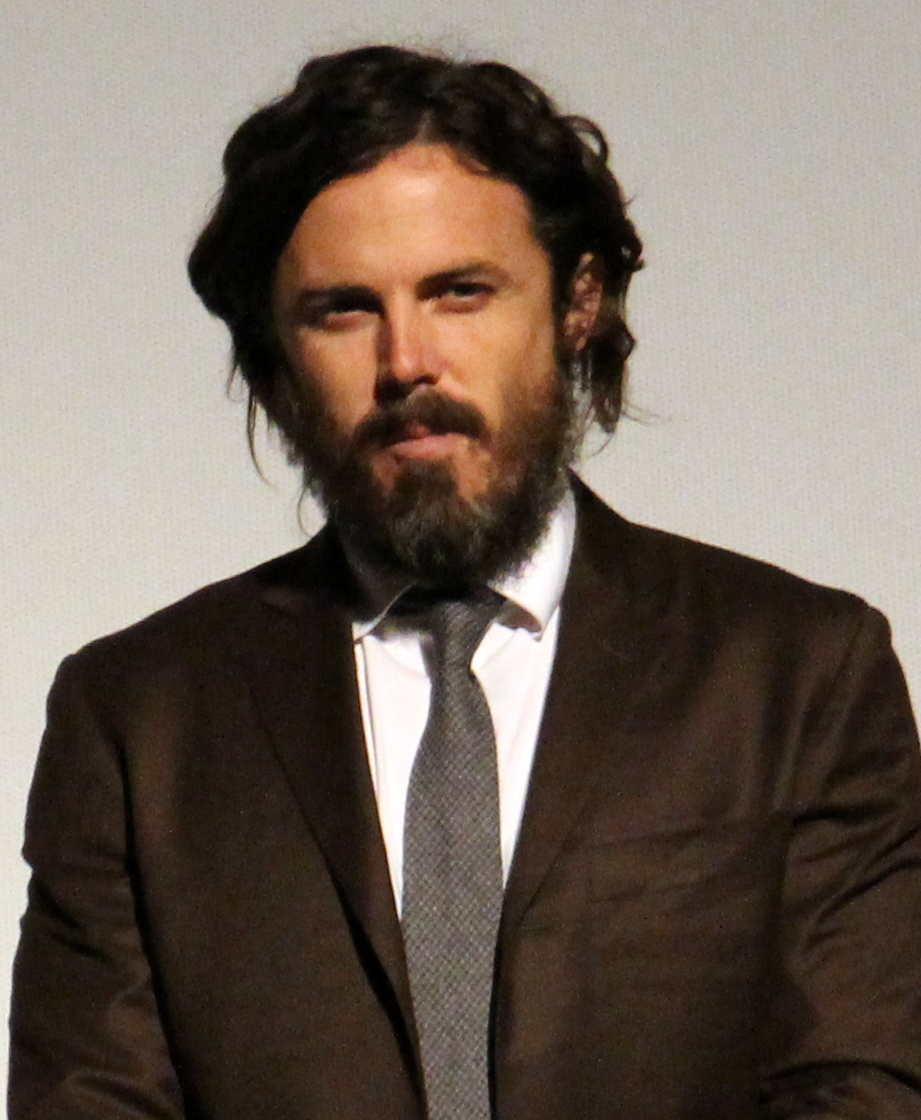
- Casey Affleck received various awards and nominations for his performance in the film.
Accolades
Award	Won	Nominated	Standing
AACTA International Awards	2	6
AARP Annual Movies for Grownups Awards	2	3
Academy Awards	2	6
ACE Eddie Awards	0	1
African-American Film Critics Association	0	1	8th place
Alliance of Women Film Journalists	2	9
Art Directors Guild Awards	0	1
Belgian Film Critics Association	0	1
Austin Film Critics Association	1	2	5th place
Black Reel Awards	0	1
Boston Society of Film Critics	2	3	Runner-up
British Academy Film Awards	2	6
British Independent Film Awards	0	1
Chicago Film Critics Association	4	8
Critics' Choice Awards	3	8
Dallas-Fort Worth Film Critics Association	2	6	2nd Place, 3rd Place (2), 4th place
Detroit Film Critics Society	1	8
Directors Guild of America Awards	0	1
Dorian Awards	0	4
Empire Awards	0	1
Florida Film Critics Circle	2	7	Runner-up (2)
Georgia Film Critics Association	1	8
Golden Globe Awards	1	5
Golden Tomato Awards	0	2	2nd Place, 9th place
Gotham Awards	1	5
Hollywood Film Awards	1	1
Houston Film Critics Society	1	6
Independent Spirit Awards	1	5
IndieWire Critics Poll	2	7	2nd Place (2), 3rd Place, 4th place, 6th place
Irish Film & Television Awards	1	2
Lisbon & Estoril Film Festival	0	1
Location Managers Guild Awards	Pending	1
London Film Critics Circle	2	5
Los Angeles Film Critics Association	0	3	Runner-up (3)
Make-Up Artists and Hair Stylists Guild	0	1
National Board of Review	4	4
National Society of Film Critics	2	5	2nd Place, 3rd Place
New York Film Critics Circle	3	3
New York Film Critics Online	2	2
Online Film Critics Society	1	6
Palm Springs International Film Festival	1	1
Producers Guild of America	0	1
Rome Film Festival	0	1
San Diego Film Critics Society	2	6	Runner-up
San Francisco Film Critics Circle	1	6
Santa Barbara International Film Festival	1	1
Satellite Awards	2	7
Screen Actors Guild Awards	0	4
St. Louis Film Critics Association	1	7	Runner-up (5)
Stockholm International Film Festival	0	1
Toronto Film Critics Association	0	1
Toronto International Film Festival	2	4	Runner-up (2)
Vancouver Film Critics Circle	5	6
Washington D.C. Area Film Critics Association	2	8
Women Film Critics Circle	1	1
Writers Guild of America Awards	0	1
- Total number of awards and nominations
Totals	67	214	
- References

Manchester by the Sea is a 2016 American drama film written and directed by Kenneth Lonergan. Starring Casey Affleck, Michelle Williams, Kyle Chandler and Lucas Hedges, the film focuses on the uncle who has to look after his teenage nephew after the boy's father dies. The film premiered at the Sundance Film Festival on January 23, 2016 and began a limited release on November 18, 2016, before going wide on December 16, 2016. The film was released to universal acclaim, with Rotten Tomatoes gave an approval rating of 96%, based on 356 reviews, with an average rating of 8.8/10 and Metacritic gave a score of 96 out of 100, based on 53 reviews.

Manchester by the Sea won Best Actor for Affleck and Best Original Screenplay and nominated for Best Picture, Best Supporting Actor for Hedges, Best Supporting Actress for Williams and Best Director at Academy Awards. The film won Best Actor in a Leading Role for Affleck and Best Original Screenplay and nominated for Best Film, Best Actress in a Supporting Role for Williams, Best Direction and Best Editing at British Academy Film Awards. The film won Best Actor for Affleck, Best Young Performer for Hedges and Best Original Screenplay and nominated for Best Picture, Best Director, Best Supporting Actor for Hedges, Best Supporting Actress for Williams and Best Acting Ensemble at Critics' Choice Awards. The film won Best Actor – Motion Picture Drama for Affleck and nominated for Best Motion Picture – Drama, Best Supporting Actress – Motion Picture for Williams, Best Director and Best Screenplay at Golden Globe Awards. The film won Best Film and Best Director and nominated for Best Actor for Affleck, Best Supporting Actor for Hedges, Best Supporting Actress for Williams, Best Original Screenplay and Best Original Score at Satellite Awards.

== Accolades ==
Award	Date of ceremony	Category	Recipient(s) and nominee(s)	Result	Ref.
AACTA International Awards	January 8, 2017	Best Film	Manchester by the Sea	Nominated	
AACTA International Awards	January 8, 2017	Best Direction	Kenneth Lonergan	Nominated	
AACTA International Awards	January 8, 2017	Best Actor	Casey Affleck	Won	
AACTA International Awards	January 8, 2017	Best Supporting Actor	Lucas Hedges	Nominated	
AACTA International Awards	January 8, 2017	Best Supporting Actress	Michelle Williams	Nominated	
AACTA International Awards	January 8, 2017	Best Screenplay	Kenneth Lonergan	Won	
AARP Annual Movies for Grownups Awards	February 6, 2017	Best Picture	Manchester by the Sea	Nominated	
AARP Annual Movies for Grownups Awards	February 6, 2017	Best Director	Kenneth Lonergan	Won	
AARP Annual Movies for Grownups Awards	February 6, 2017	Best Screenwriter	Kenneth Lonergan	Won	
Academy Awards	February 26, 2017	Best Picture	Lauren Beck, Matt Damon, Chris Moore, Kimberly Steward and Kevin J. Walsh	Nominated	
Academy Awards	February 26, 2017	Best Director	Kenneth Lonergan	Nominated	
Academy Awards	February 26, 2017	Best Actor	Casey Affleck	Won	
Academy Awards	February 26, 2017	Best Supporting Actor	Lucas Hedges	Nominated	
Academy Awards	February 26, 2017	Best Supporting Actress	Michelle Williams	Nominated	
Academy Awards	February 26, 2017	Best Original Screenplay	Kenneth Lonergan	Won	
ACE Eddie Awards	January 27, 2017	Best Edited Feature Film – Dramatic	Jennifer Lame	Nominated	
African-American Film Critics Association	February 8, 2017	Top 10 Films	Manchester by the Sea	8th place	
Alliance of Women Film Journalists	December 21, 2016	Best Film	Manchester by the Sea	Nominated	
Alliance of Women Film Journalists	December 21, 2016	Best Director	Kenneth Lonergan	Nominated	
Alliance of Women Film Journalists	December 21, 2016	Best Actor	Casey Affleck	Won	
Alliance of Women Film Journalists	December 21, 2016	Best Supporting Actor	Lucas Hedges	Nominated	
Alliance of Women Film Journalists	December 21, 2016	Best Supporting Actress	Michelle Williams	Nominated	
Alliance of Women Film Journalists	December 21, 2016	Best Screenplay, Original	Kenneth Lonergan	Won	
Alliance of Women Film Journalists	December 21, 2016	Best Cinematography	Jody Lee Lipes	Nominated	
Alliance of Women Film Journalists	December 21, 2016	Best Editing	Jennifer Lame	Nominated	
Alliance of Women Film Journalists	December 21, 2016	Best Ensemble Cast – Casting Director	Douglas Aibel	Nominated	
Art Directors Guild Awards	February 11, 2017	Excellence in Production Design for a Contemporary Film	Ruth De Jong	Nominated	
Austin Film Critics Association	December 28, 2016	Best Film	Manchester by the Sea	5th place	
Austin Film Critics Association	December 28, 2016	Best Director	Kenneth Lonergan	Nominated	
Austin Film Critics Association	December 28, 2016	Best Actor	Casey Affleck	Won	
Austin Film Critics Association	December 28, 2016	Best Supporting Actress	Michelle Williams	Nominated	
Austin Film Critics Association	December 28, 2016	Best Original Screenplay	Kenneth Lonergan	Nominated	
Australian Film Critics Association	March 13, 2018	Best International Film (English Language)	Manchester by the Sea	Nominated	
Belgian Film Critics Association	January 7, 2018	Grand Prix	Manchester by the Sea	Nominated	
Black Reel Awards	February 16, 2017	Outstanding Film	Lauren Beck, Matt Damon, Chris Moore, Kimberly Steward and Kevin J. Walsh	Nominated	
Boston Society of Film Critics	December 11, 2016	Best Actor	Casey Affleck	Won	
Boston Society of Film Critics	December 11, 2016	Best Director	Kenneth Lonergan	Runner-up	
Boston Society of Film Critics	December 11, 2016	Best Screenplay	Kenneth Lonergan	Won	
British Academy Film Awards	February 12, 2017	Best Film	Lauren Beck, Matt Damon, Chris Moore, Kimberly Steward and Kevin J. Walsh	Nominated	
British Academy Film Awards	February 12, 2017	Best Actor in a Leading Role	Casey Affleck	Won	
British Academy Film Awards	February 12, 2017	Best Actress in a Supporting Role	Michelle Williams	Nominated	
British Academy Film Awards	February 12, 2017	Best Direction	Kenneth Lonergan	Nominated	
British Academy Film Awards	February 12, 2017	Best Original Screenplay	Kenneth Lonergan	Won	
British Academy Film Awards	February 12, 2017	Best Editing	Jennifer Lame	Nominated	
British Independent Film Awards	December 4, 2016	Best Foreign Independent Film	Lauren Beck, Matt Damon, Kenneth Lonergan, Chris Moore, Kimberly Steward and Kevin J. Walsh	Nominated	
Chicago Film Critics Association	December 15, 2016	Best Film	Manchester by the Sea	Nominated	
Chicago Film Critics Association	December 15, 2016	Best Director	Kenneth Lonergan	Nominated	
Chicago Film Critics Association	December 15, 2016	Best Actor	Casey Affleck	Won	
Chicago Film Critics Association	December 15, 2016	Best Supporting Actor	Lucas Hedges	Nominated	
Chicago Film Critics Association	December 15, 2016	Best Supporting Actress	Michelle Williams	Won	
Chicago Film Critics Association	December 15, 2016	Best Original Screenplay	Kenneth Lonergan	Won	
Chicago Film Critics Association	December 15, 2016	Best Editing	Jennifer Lame	Nominated	
Chicago Film Critics Association	December 15, 2016	Most Promising Performer	Lucas Hedges	Won	
Critics' Choice Awards	December 11, 2016	Best Picture	Manchester by the Sea	Nominated	
Critics' Choice Awards	December 11, 2016	Best Director	Kenneth Lonergan	Nominated	
Critics' Choice Awards	December 11, 2016	Best Actor	Casey Affleck	Won	
Critics' Choice Awards	December 11, 2016	Best Supporting Actor	Lucas Hedges	Nominated	
Critics' Choice Awards	December 11, 2016	Best Supporting Actress	Michelle Williams	Nominated	
Critics' Choice Awards	December 11, 2016	Best Young Performer	Lucas Hedges	Won	
Critics' Choice Awards	December 11, 2016	Best Original Screenplay	Kenneth Lonergan	Won (Note: Tied with Damien Chazelle for La La Land)	
Critics' Choice Awards	December 11, 2016	Best Acting Ensemble	The cast of Manchester by the Sea	Nominated	
Dallas–Fort Worth Film Critics Association	December 13, 2016	Best Film	Manchester by the Sea	2nd Place	
Dallas–Fort Worth Film Critics Association	December 13, 2016	Best Actor	Casey Affleck	Won	
Dallas–Fort Worth Film Critics Association	December 13, 2016	Best Supporting Actor	Lucas Hedges	4th place	
Dallas–Fort Worth Film Critics Association	December 13, 2016	Best Supporting Actress	Michelle Williams	3rd Place	
Dallas–Fort Worth Film Critics Association	December 13, 2016	Best Director	Kenneth Lonergan	3rd Place	
Dallas–Fort Worth Film Critics Association	December 13, 2016	Best Screenplay	Kenneth Lonergan	Won	
Detroit Film Critics Society	December 19, 2016	Best Film	Manchester by the Sea	Nominated	
Detroit Film Critics Society	December 19, 2016	Best Actor	Casey Affleck	Won	
Detroit Film Critics Society	December 19, 2016	Best Supporting Actor	Lucas Hedges	Nominated	
Detroit Film Critics Society	December 19, 2016	Best Supporting Actress	Michelle Williams	Nominated	
Detroit Film Critics Society	December 19, 2016	Best Director	Kenneth Lonergan	Nominated	
Detroit Film Critics Society	December 19, 2016	Best Screenplay	Kenneth Lonergan	Nominated	
Detroit Film Critics Society	December 19, 2016	Best Breakthrough	Lucas Hedges (actor)	Nominated	
Detroit Film Critics Society	December 19, 2016	Best Ensemble	The cast of Manchester by the Sea	Nominated	
Directors Guild of America Awards	February 4, 2017	Outstanding Directing – Feature Film	Kenneth Lonergan	Nominated	
Dorian Awards	January 26, 2017	Film of the Year	Manchester by the Sea	Nominated	
Dorian Awards	January 26, 2017	Director of the Year	Kenneth Lonergan	Nominated	
Dorian Awards	January 26, 2017	Film Performance of the Year – Actor	Casey Affleck	Nominated	
Dorian Awards	January 26, 2017	Screenplay of the Year	Kenneth Lonergan	Nominated	
Empire Awards	March 19, 2017	Best Actor	Casey Affleck	Nominated	
Florida Film Critics Circle	December 23, 2016	Best Film	Manchester by the Sea	Nominated	
Florida Film Critics Circle	December 23, 2016	Best Director	Kenneth Lonergan	Nominated	
Florida Film Critics Circle	December 23, 2016	Best Actor	Casey Affleck	Won	
Florida Film Critics Circle	December 23, 2016	Best Supporting Actress	Michelle Williams	Won	
Florida Film Critics Circle	December 23, 2016	Best Ensemble	The cast of Manchester by the Sea	Nominated	
Florida Film Critics Circle	December 23, 2016	Best Original Screenplay	Kenneth Lonergan	Runner-up	
Florida Film Critics Circle	December 23, 2016	FCC Breakout Award	Lucas Hedges	Runner-up	
Georgia Film Critics Association	January 13, 2017	Best Picture	Manchester by the Sea	Nominated	
Georgia Film Critics Association	January 13, 2017	Best Director	Kenneth Lonergan	Nominated	
Georgia Film Critics Association	January 13, 2017	Best Actor	Casey Affleck	Won	
Georgia Film Critics Association	January 13, 2017	Best Supporting Actor	Lucas Hedges	Nominated	
Georgia Film Critics Association	January 13, 2017	Best Supporting Actress	Michelle Williams	Nominated	
Georgia Film Critics Association	January 13, 2017	Best Original Screenplay	Kenneth Lonergan	Nominated	
Georgia Film Critics Association	January 13, 2017	Best Ensemble	The cast of Manchester by the Sea	Nominated	
Georgia Film Critics Association	January 13, 2017	Breakthrough Award	Lucas Hedges	Nominated	
Golden Globe Awards	January 8, 2017	Best Motion Picture – Drama	Manchester by the Sea	Nominated	
Golden Globe Awards	January 8, 2017	Best Actor – Motion Picture Drama	Casey Affleck	Won	
Golden Globe Awards	January 8, 2017	Best Supporting Actress – Motion Picture	Michelle Williams	Nominated	
Golden Globe Awards	January 8, 2017	Best Director	Kenneth Lonergan	Nominated	
Golden Globe Awards	January 8, 2017	Best Screenplay	Kenneth Lonergan	Nominated	
Golden Tomato Awards	January 12, 2017	Best Wide Release 2016	Manchester by the Sea	9th place	
Golden Tomato Awards	January 12, 2017	Best Drama Movie 2016	Manchester by the Sea	2nd Place	
Gotham Awards	November 28, 2016	Best Feature	Manchester by the Sea	Nominated	
Gotham Awards	November 28, 2016	Best Actor	Casey Affleck	Won	
Gotham Awards	November 28, 2016	Best Screenplay	Kenneth Lonergan	Nominated	
Gotham Awards	November 28, 2016	Breakthrough Actor	Lucas Hedges	Nominated	
Gotham Awards	November 28, 2016	Audience Award	Manchester by the Sea	Nominated	
Hollywood Film Awards	November 6, 2016	Hollywood Screenwriter Award	Kenneth Lonergan	Won	
Houston Film Critics Society	January 6, 2017	Best Picture	Manchester by the Sea	Nominated	
Houston Film Critics Society	January 6, 2017	Best Actor	Casey Affleck	Won	
Houston Film Critics Society	January 6, 2017	Best Supporting Actor	Lucas Hedges	Nominated	
Houston Film Critics Society	January 6, 2017	Best Supporting Actress	Michelle Williams	Nominated	
Houston Film Critics Society	January 6, 2017	Best Director	Kenneth Lonergan	Nominated	
Houston Film Critics Society	January 6, 2017	Best Screenplay	Kenneth Lonergan	Nominated	
Independent Spirit Awards	February 25, 2017	Best Film	Manchester by the Sea	Nominated	
Independent Spirit Awards	February 25, 2017	Best Male Lead	Casey Affleck	Won	
Independent Spirit Awards	February 25, 2017	Best Supporting Male	Lucas Hedges	Nominated	
Independent Spirit Awards	February 25, 2017	Best Screenplay	Kenneth Lonergan	Nominated	
Independent Spirit Awards	February 25, 2017	Best Editing	Jennifer Lame	Nominated	
IndieWire Critics Poll	December 19, 2016	Best Film	Manchester by the Sea	2nd Place	
IndieWire Critics Poll	December 19, 2016	Best Director	Kenneth Lonergan	4th place	
IndieWire Critics Poll	December 19, 2016	Best Actor	Casey Affleck	Won	
IndieWire Critics Poll	December 19, 2016	Best Supporting Actress	Michelle Williams	2nd Place	
IndieWire Critics Poll	December 19, 2016	Best Supporting Actor	Lucas Hedges	3rd Place	
IndieWire Critics Poll	December 19, 2016	Best Screenplay	Manchester by the Sea	Won	
IndieWire Critics Poll	December 19, 2016	Best Editing	Manchester by the Sea	6th place	
Irish Film & Television Awards	April 8, 2017	International Film	Manchester by the Sea	Nominated	
Irish Film & Television Awards	April 8, 2017	International Actor	Casey Affleck	Won	
Lisbon & Estoril Film Festival	November 13, 2016	Jaeger – LeCoultre Best Film Award	Manchester by the Sea	Nominated	
Location Managers Guild Awards	April 8, 2017	Outstanding Locations in Contemporary Film	Alex Berard and Kai Quinlan	Nominated	
London Film Critics Circle	January 22, 2017	Film of the Year	Manchester by the Sea	Nominated	
London Film Critics Circle	January 22, 2017	Director of the Year	Kenneth Lonergan	Nominated	
London Film Critics Circle	January 22, 2017	Actor of the Year	Casey Affleck	Won	
London Film Critics Circle	January 22, 2017	Supporting Actress of the Year	Michelle Williams	Nominated	
London Film Critics Circle	January 22, 2017	Screenwriter of the Year	Kenneth Lonergan	Won	
Los Angeles Film Critics Association	December 4, 2016	Best Actor	Casey Affleck	Runner-up	
Los Angeles Film Critics Association	December 4, 2016	Best Supporting Actress	Michelle Williams	Runner-up	
Los Angeles Film Critics Association	December 4, 2016	Best Screenplay	Kenneth Lonergan	Runner-up	
Make-Up Artists and Hair Stylists Guild	February 19, 2017	Feature-Length Motion Picture – Contemporary Make-Up	Liz Bernstrom and Sherryn Smith	Nominated	
National Board of Review	January 4, 2017	Best Film	Manchester by the Sea	Won	
National Board of Review	January 4, 2017	Best Actor	Casey Affleck	Won	
National Board of Review	January 4, 2017	Best Original Screenplay	Kenneth Lonergan	Won	
National Board of Review	January 4, 2017	Breakthrough Male Performance	Lucas Hedges	Won	
National Society of Film Critics	January 7, 2017	Best Film	Manchester by the Sea	2nd Place	
National Society of Film Critics	January 7, 2017	Best Director	Kenneth Lonergan	3rd Place	
National Society of Film Critics	January 7, 2017	Best Actor	Casey Affleck	Won	
National Society of Film Critics	January 7, 2017	Best Supporting Actress	Michelle Williams	Won	
National Society of Film Critics	January 7, 2017	Best Screenplay	Kenneth Lonergan	Won	
New York Film Critics Circle	December 1, 2016	Best Actor	Casey Affleck	Won	
New York Film Critics Circle	December 1, 2016	Best Supporting Actress	Michelle Williams (also for Certain Women)	Won	
New York Film Critics Circle	December 1, 2016	Best Screenplay	Kenneth Lonergan	Won	
New York Film Critics Online	December 11, 2016	Best Actor	Casey Affleck	Won	
New York Film Critics Online	December 11, 2016	Top 12 Films	Manchester by the Sea	Won	
Online Film Critics Society	January 3, 2017	Best Picture	Manchester by the Sea	Nominated	
Online Film Critics Society	January 3, 2017	Best Director	Kenneth Lonergan	Nominated	
Online Film Critics Society	January 3, 2017	Best Actor	Casey Affleck	Won	
Online Film Critics Society	January 3, 2017	Best Supporting Actor	Lucas Hedges	Nominated	
Online Film Critics Society	January 3, 2017	Best Supporting Actress	Michelle Williams	Nominated	
Online Film Critics Society	January 3, 2017	Best Original Screenplay	Kenneth Lonergan	Nominated	
Palm Springs International Film Festival	January 2, 2017	Desert Palm Achievement Award for Best Actor	Casey Affleck	Won	
Producers Guild of America	January 28, 2017	Best Theatrical Motion Picture	Lauren Beck, Matt Damon, Chris Moore, Kimberly Steward and Kevin J. Walsh	Nominated	
Rome Film Festival	October 23, 2016	BNL People's Choice Award	Manchester by the Sea	Nominated	
San Diego Film Critics Society	December 12, 2016	Best Film	Manchester by the Sea	Nominated	
San Diego Film Critics Society	December 12, 2016	Best Director	Kenneth Lonergan	Nominated	
San Diego Film Critics Society	December 12, 2016	Best Actor	Casey Affleck	Won	
San Diego Film Critics Society	December 12, 2016	Best Supporting Actress	Michelle Williams	Won	
San Diego Film Critics Society	December 12, 2016	Best Original Screenplay	Kenneth Lonergan	Nominated	
San Diego Film Critics Society	December 12, 2016	Breakthrough Artist	Lucas Hedges	Runner-up	
San Francisco Film Critics Circle	December 11, 2016	Best Film	Manchester by the Sea	Nominated	
San Francisco Film Critics Circle	December 11, 2016	Best Director	Kenneth Lonergan	Nominated	
San Francisco Film Critics Circle	December 11, 2016	Best Actor	Casey Affleck	Nominated	
San Francisco Film Critics Circle	December 11, 2016	Best Supporting Actress	Michelle Williams	Nominated	
San Francisco Film Critics Circle	December 11, 2016	Best Original Screenplay	Kenneth Lonergan	Won (Note: Tied with Barry Jenkins for Moonlight)	
San Francisco Film Critics Circle	December 11, 2016	Best Film Editing	Jennifer Lame	Nominated	
Santa Barbara International Film Festival	February 5, 2017	Cinema Vanguard Award	Casey Affleck and Michelle Williams	Won	
Satellite Awards	February 19, 2017	Best Film	Manchester by the Sea	Won (Note: Tied with La La Land)	
Satellite Awards	February 19, 2017	Best Director	Kenneth Lonergan	Won	
Satellite Awards	February 19, 2017	Best Actor	Casey Affleck	Nominated	
Satellite Awards	February 19, 2017	Best Supporting Actor	Lucas Hedges	Nominated	
Satellite Awards	February 19, 2017	Best Supporting Actress	Michelle Williams	Nominated	
Satellite Awards	February 19, 2017	Best Original Screenplay	Kenneth Lonergan	Nominated	
Satellite Awards	February 19, 2017	Best Original Score	Lesley Barber	Nominated	
Screen Actors Guild Awards	January 29, 2017	Outstanding Performance by a Male Actor in a Leading Role	Casey Affleck	Nominated	
Screen Actors Guild Awards	January 29, 2017	Outstanding Performance by a Male Actor in a Supporting Role	Lucas Hedges	Nominated	
Screen Actors Guild Awards	January 29, 2017	Outstanding Performance by a Female Actor in a Supporting Role	Michelle Williams	Nominated	
Screen Actors Guild Awards	January 29, 2017	Outstanding Performance by a Cast in a Motion Picture	The cast of Manchester by the Sea	Nominated	
St. Louis Film Critics Association	December 18, 2016	Best Film	Manchester by the Sea	Runner-up (Note: Tied with Hell or High Water)	
St. Louis Film Critics Association	December 18, 2016	Best Director	Kenneth Lonergan	Runner-up (Note: Tied with Denis Villeneuve for Arrival)	
St. Louis Film Critics Association	December 18, 2016	Best Actor	Casey Affleck	Won	
St. Louis Film Critics Association	December 18, 2016	Best Supporting Actor	Lucas Hedges	Runner-up	
St. Louis Film Critics Association	December 18, 2016	Best Supporting Actress	Michelle Williams	Runner-up	
St. Louis Film Critics Association	December 18, 2016	Best Original Screenplay	Kenneth Lonergan	Runner-up	
St. Louis Film Critics Association	December 18, 2016	Best Scene	"Lee (Casey Affleck) and Randi (Michelle Williams) meet on the street"	Nominated	
Stockholm International Film Festival	November 20, 2016	Bronze Horse	Manchester by the Sea	Nominated	
Toronto Film Critics Association	December 11, 2016	Best Film	Manchester by the Sea	Runner-up	
Toronto Film Critics Association	December 11, 2016	Best Actor	Casey Affleck	Runner-up	
Toronto Film Critics Association	December 11, 2016	Best Supporting Actress	Michelle Williams	Won	
Toronto Film Critics Association	December 11, 2016	Best Screenplay	Kenneth Lonergan	Won	
Vancouver Film Critics Circle	December 20, 2016	Best Film	Manchester by the Sea	Won	
Vancouver Film Critics Circle	December 20, 2016	Best Actor	Casey Affleck	Won	
Vancouver Film Critics Circle	December 20, 2016	Best Supporting Actor	Lucas Hedges	Nominated	
Vancouver Film Critics Circle	December 20, 2016	Best Supporting Actress	Michelle Williams	Won	
Vancouver Film Critics Circle	December 20, 2016	Best Director	Kenneth Lonergan	Won	
Vancouver Film Critics Circle	December 20, 2016	Best Screenplay	Kenneth Lonergan	Won	
Washington D.C. Area Film Critics Association	December 5, 2016	Best Film	Manchester by the Sea	Nominated	
Washington D.C. Area Film Critics Association	December 5, 2016	Best Director	Kenneth Lonergan	Nominated	
Washington D.C. Area Film Critics Association	December 5, 2016	Best Actor	Casey Affleck	Won	
Washington D.C. Area Film Critics Association	December 5, 2016	Best Supporting Actor	Lucas Hedges	Nominated	
Washington D.C. Area Film Critics Association	December 5, 2016	Best Supporting Actress	Michelle Williams	Nominated	
Washington D.C. Area Film Critics Association	December 5, 2016	Best Youth Performance	Lucas Hedges	Won	
Washington D.C. Area Film Critics Association	December 5, 2016	Best Ensemble	The cast of Manchester by the Sea	Nominated	
Washington D.C. Area Film Critics Association	December 5, 2016	Best Original Screenplay	Kenneth Lonergan	Nominated	
Women Film Critics Circle	December 19, 2016	Best Actor	Casey Affleck	Won	
Writers Guild of America Awards	February 19, 2017	Best Original Screenplay	Kenneth Lonergan	Nominated	
