= AACTA International Award for Best Film =

Australian film award

AACTA Award for Best International Film
- Country: Australia
- Presented by: Australian Academy of Cinema and Television Arts (AACTA)
- First award: 2012
- Currently held by: One Battle After Another (2025)
- Website: https://www.aacta.org

The AACTA Award for Best International Film is an award presented by the Australian Academy of Cinema and Television Arts (AACTA), a non-profit organisation whose aim is to "identify, award, promote, and celebrate Australia's greatest achievements in film and television". The award is presented at the annual AACTA International Awards, which hand out accolades for achievements in feature films, regardless of where the film was made.

From 1992 to 2004, a similar award was presented by the Australian Film Institute (AFI), the Academy's parent organisation. It was known as the AFI Award for Best Foreign Film and was handed out at the annual Australian Film Institute Awards (known as the AFI Awards).

== Winners and nominees ==
The winner is highlighted first and highlighted in boldface.

=== 2010s ===
Year	Film	Recipient(s)
**2011** (1st)
**2011** (1st)	**The Artist**	**Thomas Langmann**
**2011** (1st)	The Descendants	Jim Burke, Alexander Payne, and Jim Taylor
**2011** (1st)	Hugo	Johnny Depp, Timothy Headington, Graham King, and Martin Scorsese
**2011** (1st)	The Ides of March	George Clooney, Grant Heslov, and Brian Oliver
**2011** (1st)	Margin Call	Robert Ogden Barnum, Michael Benaroya, Neal Dodson, Joe Jenckes, Corey Moosa, Zachary Quinto, Laura Rister, and Cassian Elwes
**2011** (1st)	Melancholia	Meta Louise Foldager and Louise Vesth
**2011** (1st)	Midnight in Paris	Letty Aronson, Stephen Tenenbaum, and Jaume Roures
**2011** (1st)	Moneyball	Michael De Luca, Rachael Horovitz, and Brad Pitt
**2011** (1st)	The Tree of Life	Dede Gardner, Sarah Green, Grant Hill, Brad Pitt, and Bill Pohlad
**2011** (1st)	We Need to Talk About Kevin	Jennifer Fox, Luc Roeg, and Bob Salerno
**2012** (2nd)
**2012** (2nd)	**Silver Linings Playbook**	**Bruce Cohen, Donna Gigliotti, and Jonathan Gordon**
**2012** (2nd)	Argo	Ben Affleck, George Clooney, and Grant Heslov
**2012** (2nd)	Les Misérables	Tim Bevan, Eric Fellner, Debra Hayward, and Cameron Mackintosh
**2012** (2nd)	Life of Pi	Ang Lee, Gil Netter, and David Womark
**2012** (2nd)	Lincoln	Kathleen Kennedy and Steven Spielberg
**2012** (2nd)	Zero Dark Thirty	Kathryn Bigelow, Mark Boal, and Megan Ellison
**2013** (3rd)
**2013** (3rd)	**Gravity**	**Alfonso Cuarón and David Heyman**
**2013** (3rd)	12 Years a Slave	Brad Pitt, Dede Gardner, Jeremy Kleiner, Bill Pohlad, Steve McQueen, Arnon Milchan, and Anthony Katagas
**2013** (3rd)	American Hustle	Charles Roven, Richard Suckle, and Megan Ellison
**2013** (3rd)	Captain Phillips	Michael De Luca, Dana Brunetti, and Scott Rudin
**2013** (3rd)	Rush	Andrew Eaton, Eric Fellner, Brian Oliver, Peter Morgan, Brian Grazer, and Ron Howard
**2014** (4th)
**2014** (4th)	**Birdman or (The Unexpected Virtue of Ignorance)**	**Alejandro G. Iñárritu, John Lesher, Arnon Milchan, and James W. Skotchdopole**
**2014** (4th)	Boyhood	Richard Linklater, Cathleen Sutherland, Jonathan Sehring, and John Sloss
**2014** (4th)	The Grand Budapest Hotel	Wes Anderson, Scott Rudin, Steven Rales, and Jeremy Dawson
**2014** (4th)	The Imitation Game	Nora Grossman, Ido Ostrowsky, and Teddy Schwarzman
**2014** (4th)	Whiplash	Jason Blum, Helen Estabrook, Michel Litvak, and David Lancaster
**2015** (5th)
**2015** (5th)	**Mad Max: Fury Road**	**Doug Mitchell, George Miller, and P. J. Voeten**
**2015** (5th)	The Big Short	Dede Gardner, Jeremy Kleiner, Arnon Milchan, and Brad Pitt
**2015** (5th)	Carol	Elizabeth Karlsen, Stephen Woolley, and Christine Vachon
**2015** (5th)	The Revenant	Arnon Milchan, Steve Golin, Alejandro G. Iñárritu, David Kanter, Mary Parent, James W. Skotchdopole, and Keith Redmon
**2015** (5th)	Spotlight	Blye Pagon Faust, Steve Golin, Nicole Rocklin, and Michael Sugar
**2016** (6th)
**2016** (6th)	**La La Land**	**Fred Berger, Gary Gilbert, Jordan Horowitz, and Marc Platt**
**2016** (6th)	Arrival	Dan Levine, Shawn Levy, David Linde, and Aaron Ryder
**2016** (6th)	Hacksaw Ridge	Terry Benedict, Paul Currie, Bruce Davey, William D. Johnson, Bill Mechanic, Brian Oliver, and David Permut
**2016** (6th)	Lion	Iain Canning, Angie Fielder, and Emile Sherman
**2016** (6th)	Manchester by the Sea	Kimberly Steward, Lauren Beck, Matt Damon, Chris Moore, and Kevin J. Walsh
**2017** (7th)
**2017** (7th)	**Three Billboards Outside Ebbing, Missouri**	**Graham Broadbent, Pete Czernin, and Martin McDonagh**
**2017** (7th)	Call Me by Your Name	Peter Spears, Luca Guadagnino, Émilie Georges, and Marco Morabito
**2017** (7th)	Dunkirk	Christopher Nolan and Emma Thomas
**2017** (7th)	Lady Bird	Scott Rudin, Eli Bush, and Evelyn O'Neill
**2017** (7th)	The Shape of Water	Guillermo del Toro and J. Miles Dale
**2018** (8th)
**2018** (8th)	**Roma**	**Nicolás Celis, Alfonso Cuarón, and Gabriela Rodríguez**
**2018** (8th)	BlacKkKlansman	Jason Blum, Spike Lee, Raymond Mansfield, Sean McKittrick, Jordan Peele, and Shaun Redick
**2018** (8th)	Bohemian Rhapsody	Jim Beach, and Graham King
**2018** (8th)	A Star Is Born	Bradley Cooper, Bill Gerber, Jon Peters, Todd Phillips, and Lynette Howell Taylor
**2018** (8th)	Vice	Megan Ellison, Will Ferrell, Dede Gardner, Jeremy Kleiner, Adam McKay, Kevin Messick, and Brad Pitt
**2019** (9th)
**2019** (9th)	**Parasite**	**Kwak Sin-ae and Bong Joon-ho**
**2019** (9th)	The Irishman	Martin Scorsese, Robert De Niro, and Irwin Winkler
**2019** (9th)	Joker	Bradley Cooper, Todd Phillips, and Emma Tillinger Koskoff
**2019** (9th)	The King	Brad Pitt, Dede Gardner, Jeremy Kleiner, Liz Watts, David Michôd, and Joel Edgerton
**2019** (9th)	Once Upon a Time in Hollywood	David Heyman, Shannon McIntosh, and Quentin Tarantino

=== 2020s ===
Year	Film	Recipient(s)
**2020** (10th)
**2020** (10th)	**Promising Young Woman**	**Margot Robbie, Josey McNamara, Tom Ackerley, Ben Browning, Ashley Fox, and Emerald Fennell**
**2020** (10th)	The Father	David Parfitt, Jean-Louis Livi, Philippe Carcassonne, Christophe Spardone, and Simon Friend
**2020** (10th)	Minari	Dede Gardner, Jeremy Kleiner, and Christina Oh
**2020** (10th)	Nomadland	Frances McDormand, Peter Spears, Mollye Asher, Dan Janvey, and Chloé Zhao
**2020** (10th)	The Trial of the Chicago 7	Stuart M. Besser, Matt Jackson, Marc Platt, and Tyler Thompson
**2021** (11th)
**2021** (11th)	**The Power of the Dog**	**Emile Sherman, Iain Canning, Roger Frappier, Jane Campion, and Tanya Seghatchian**
**2021** (11th)	Being the Ricardos	Todd Black, Jason Blumenthal, and Steve Tisch
**2021** (11th)	Belfast	Laura Berwick, Kenneth Branagh, Becca Kovacik, and Tamar Thomas
**2021** (11th)	Dune	Mary Parent, Denis Villeneuve, Cale Boyter, and Joe Caracciolo Jr.
**2021** (11th)	Licorice Pizza	Sara Murphy, Adam Somner, and Paul Thomas Anderson
**2021** (11th)	Nitram	Nick Batzias, Virginia Whitwell, Justin Kurzel, and Shaun Grant
**2022** (12th)
**2022** (12th)	**Avatar: The Way of Water**	**James Cameron and Jon Landau**
**2022** (12th)	The Banshees of Inisherin	Graham Broadbent, Pete Czernin, and Martin McDonagh
**2022** (12th)	Elvis	Baz Luhrmann, Catherine Martin, Gail Berman, Patrick McCormick, and Schuyler Weiss
**2022** (12th)	Everything Everywhere All at Once	Anthony Russo, Joe Russo, Mike Larocca, Daniel Kwan, Daniel Scheinert, Jonathan Wang, and Peter Tam Lee
**2022** (12th)	Top Gun: Maverick	Tom Cruise, Christopher McQuarrie, David Ellison, and Jerry Bruckheimer
**2023** (13th)
**2023** (13th)	**Barbie**	**David Heyman, Margot Robbie, Tom Ackerley, and Robbie Brenner**
**2023** (13th)	American Fiction	Ben LeClair, Nikos Karamigios, Cord Jefferson, and Jermaine Johnson
**2023** (13th)	Killers of the Flower Moon	Dan Friedkin, Bradley Thomas, Martin Scorsese, and Daniel Lupi
**2023** (13th)	Oppenheimer	Emma Thomas, Charles Roven, and Christopher Nolan
**2023** (13th)	Poor Things	Ed Guiney, Andrew Lowe, Yorgos Lanthimos, and Emma Stone
**2024** (14th)
**2024** (14th)	**Better Man**	**Paul Currie, Michael Gracey, Coco Xiaolu Ma, Craig McMahon, and Jules Daly**
**2024** (14th)	Anora	Alex Coco, Samantha Quan, and Sean Baker
**2024** (14th)	Dune: Part Two	Mary Parent,Cale Boyter, Patrick McCormick, Tanya Lapointe, and Denis Villeneuve
**2024** (14th)	Emilia Pérez	Jacques Audiard, Pascal Caucheteux, Valérie Schermann, and Anthony Vaccarello
**2024** (14th)	The Brutalist	Trevor Matthews, Nick Gordon, Brian Young, Andrew Morrison, Andrew Lauren, D.J. Gugenheim, and Brady Corbet
**2025** (15th)
**2025** (15th)	**One Battle After Another**	**Adam Somner (p.n.), Sara Murphy, and Paul Thomas Anderson**
**2025** (15th)	Hamnet	Liza Marshall, Pippa Harris, Nicolas Gonda, Steven Spielberg, and Sam Mendes
**2025** (15th)	Marty Supreme	Eli Bush, Ronald Bronstein, Josh Safdie, Anthony Katagas, and Timothée Chalamet
**2025** (15th)	Nuremberg	Richard Saperstein, Bradley J. Fischer, James Vanderbilt, Frank Smith, William Sherak, Benjamin Tappan, Cherilyn Hawrysh, István Major, and George Freeman
**2025** (15th)	Sinners	Zinzi Coogler, Sev Ohanian, and Ryan Coogler

== See also ==
- AACTA Awards
- AACTA Award for Best Film
- Australian Film Institute Award for Best Foreign Film
