= 70th British Academy Film Awards =

2017 film award ceremony

- Date: 12 February 2017
- Site: Royal Albert Hall, London
- Hosted by: Stephen Fry

Highlights
- Best Film: La La Land
- Best British Film: I, Daniel Blake
- Best Actor: Casey Affleck; Manchester by the Sea
- Best Actress: Emma Stone; La La Land
- Most awards: La La Land (5)
- Most nominations: La La Land (11)

The 70th British Academy Film Awards, more commonly known as the BAFTAs, were held on 12 February 2017 at the Royal Albert Hall in London, honouring the best national and foreign films of 2016. Presented by the British Academy of Film and Television Arts, accolades were handed out for the best feature-length film and documentaries of any nationality that were screened at British cinemas in 2016.

The nominees were announced on 10 January 2017 by actor Dominic Cooper and actress Sophie Turner. La La Land received the most nominations in twelve categories; Arrival and Nocturnal Animals followed with nine each.

The ceremony was hosted by Stephen Fry for the twelfth time.

== Winners and nominees ==
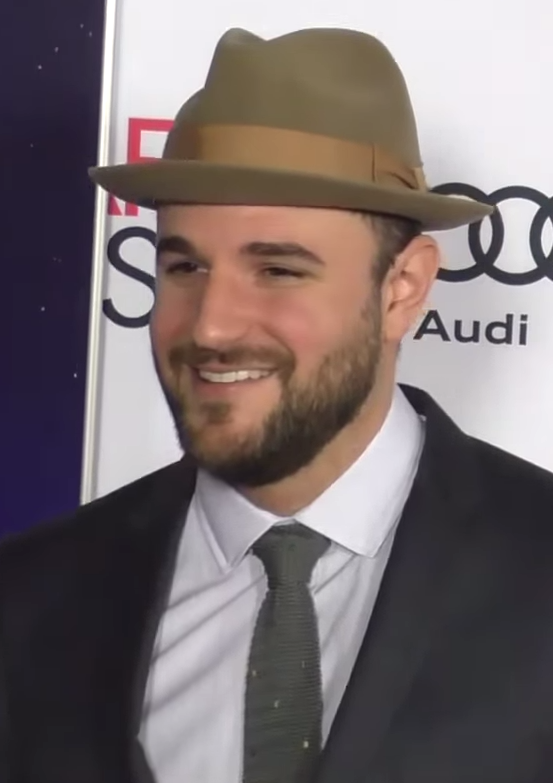
Jordan Horowitz, Best Film co-winner

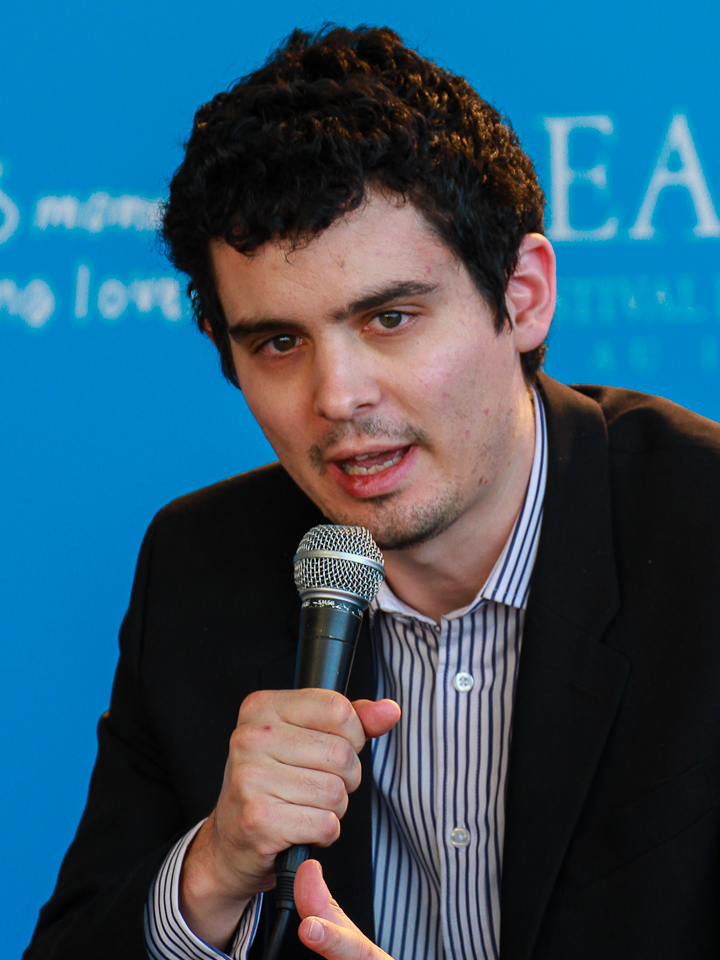
Damien Chazelle, Best Direction winner

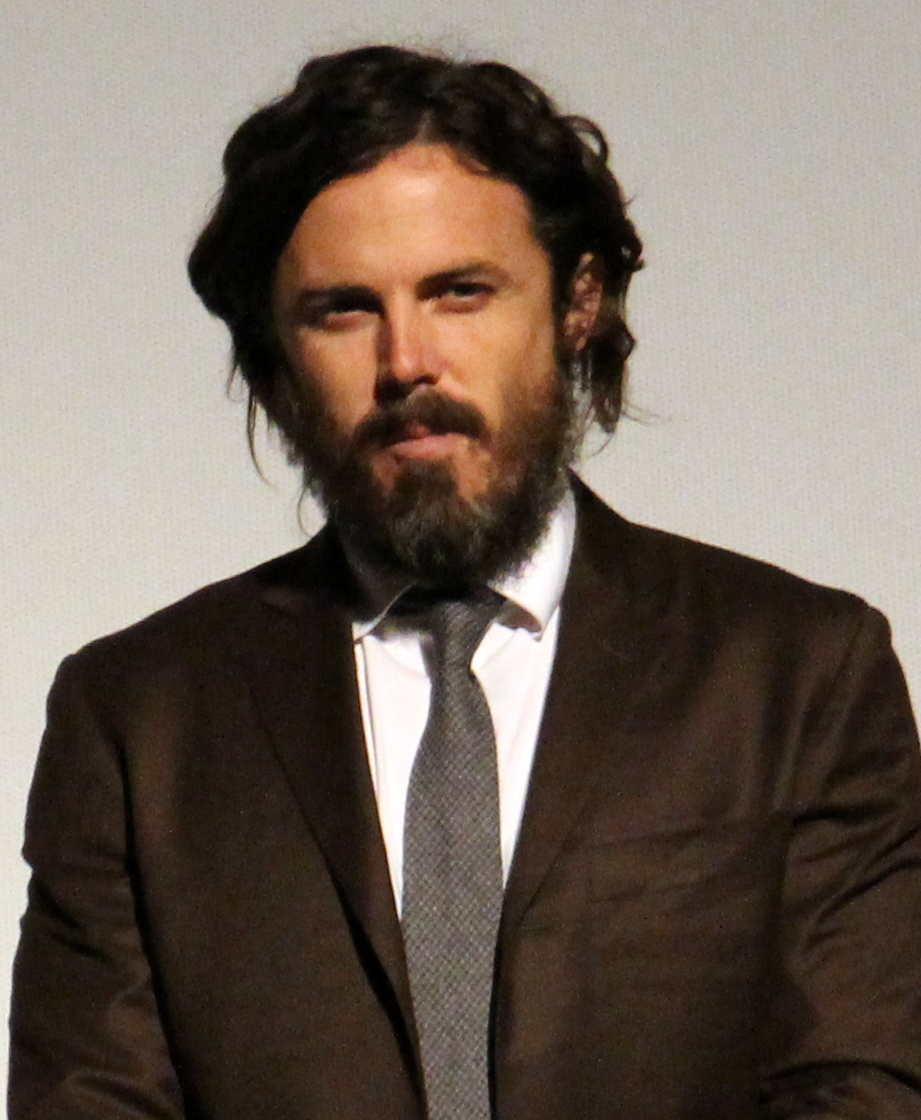
Casey Affleck, Best Actor in a Leading Role winner

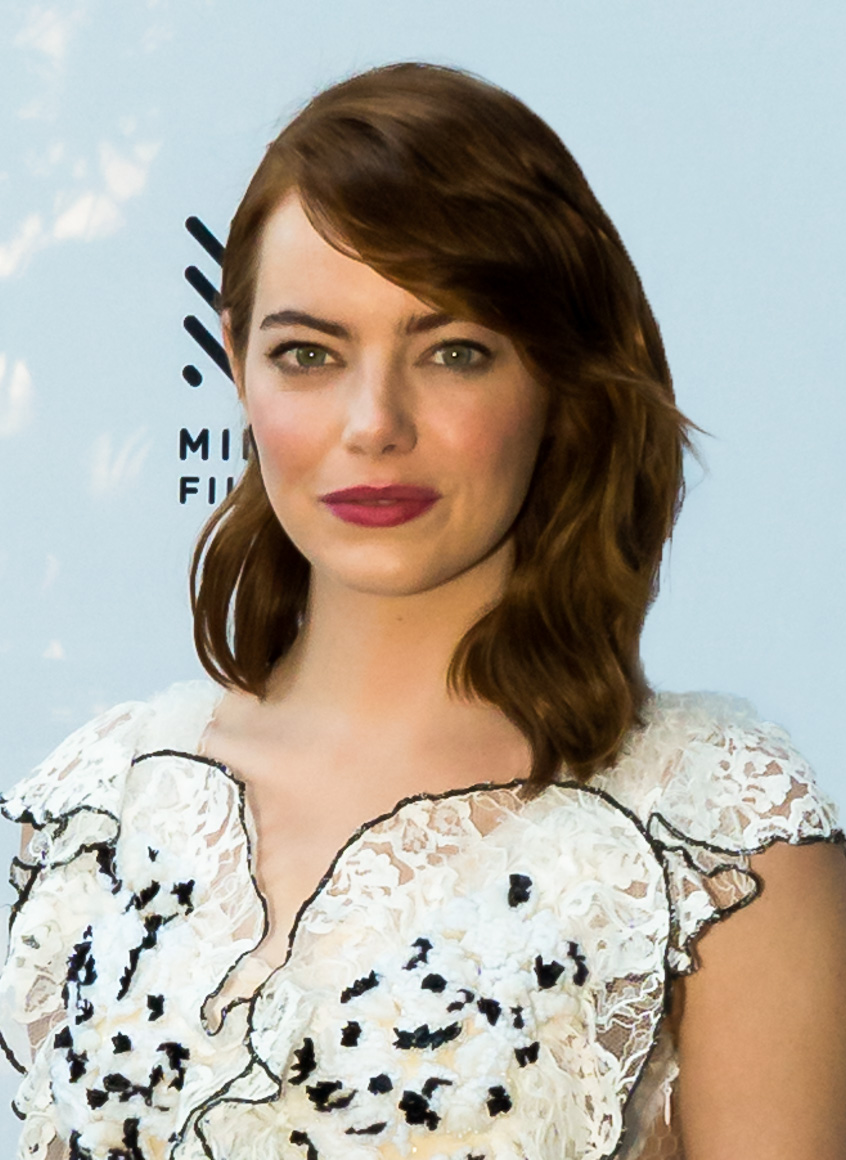
Emma Stone, Best Actress in a Leading Role winner

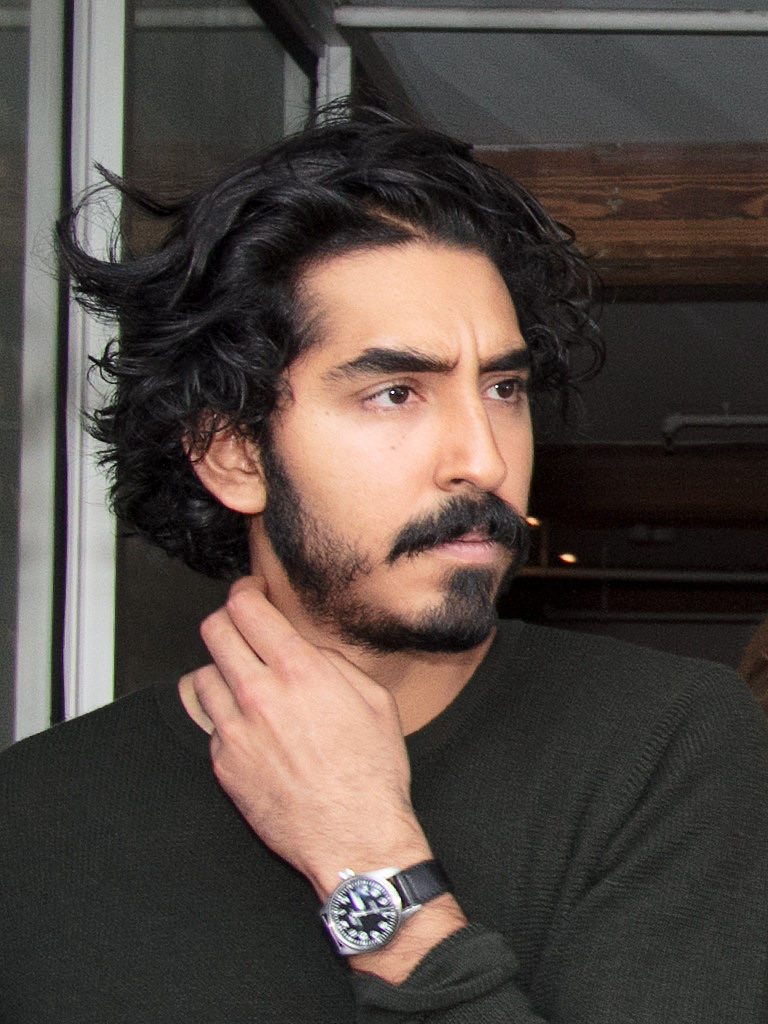
Dev Patel, Best Actor in a Supporting Role winner

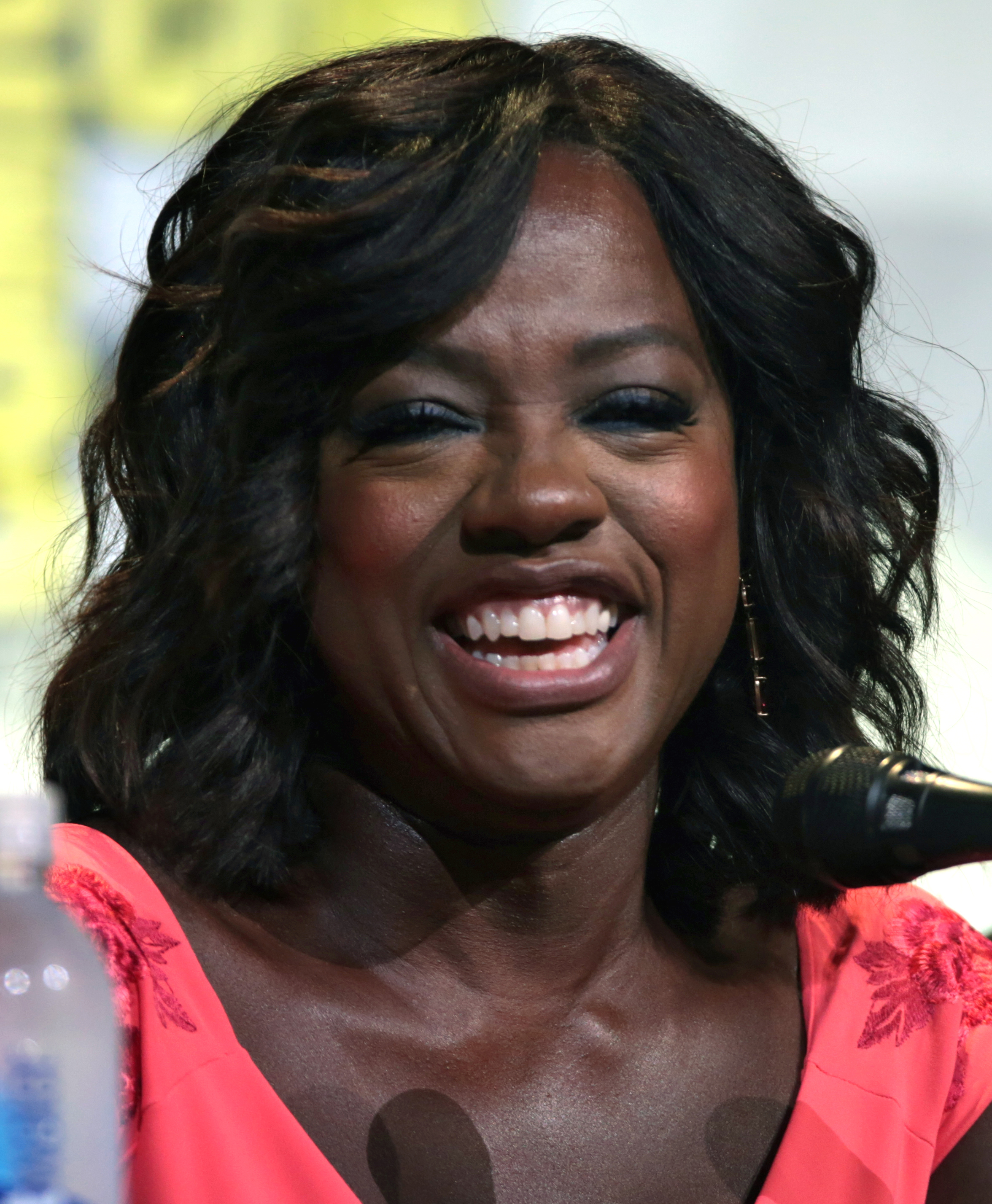
Viola Davis, Best Actress in a Supporting Role winner

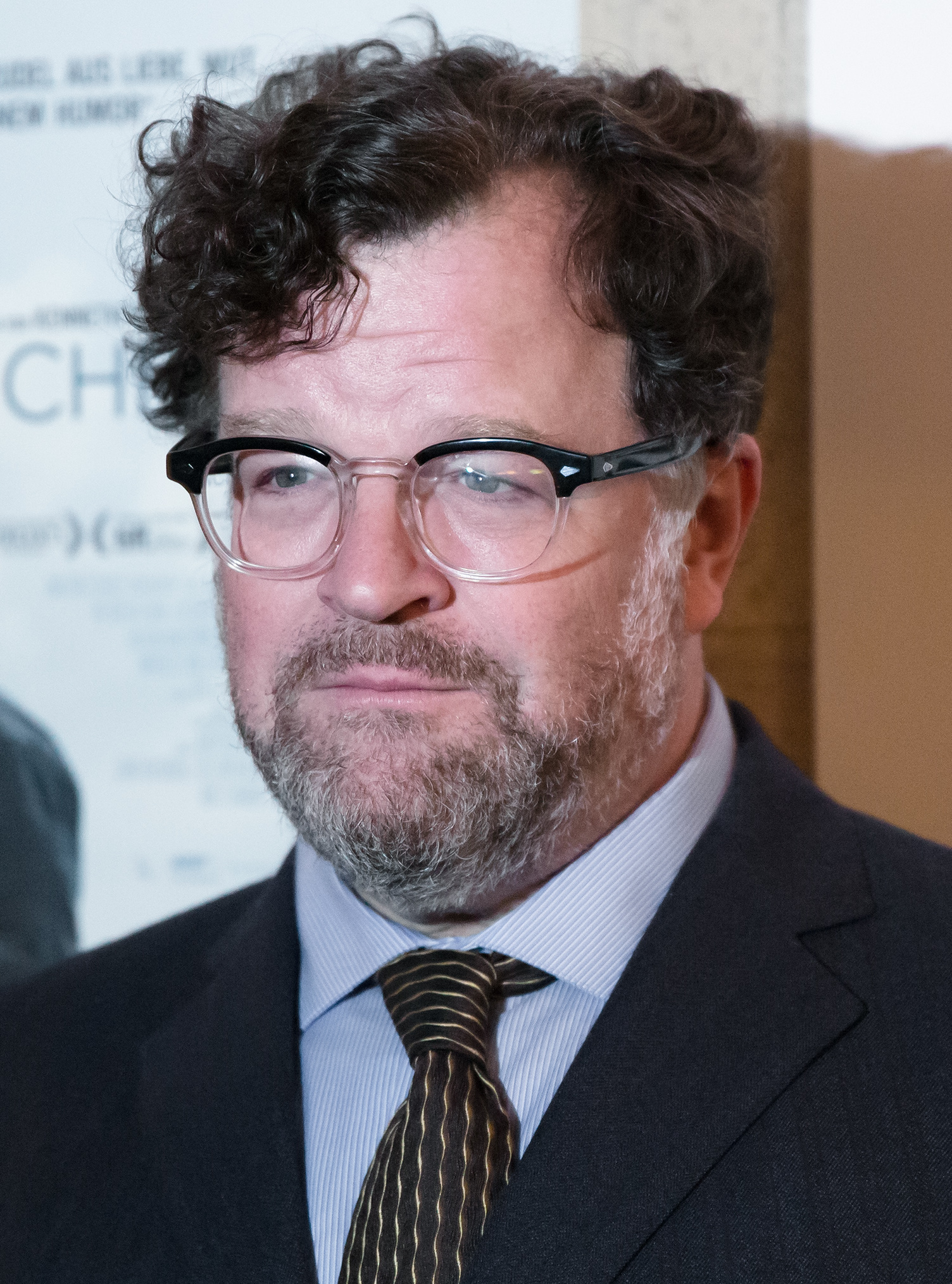
Kenneth Lonergan, Best Original Screenplay winner

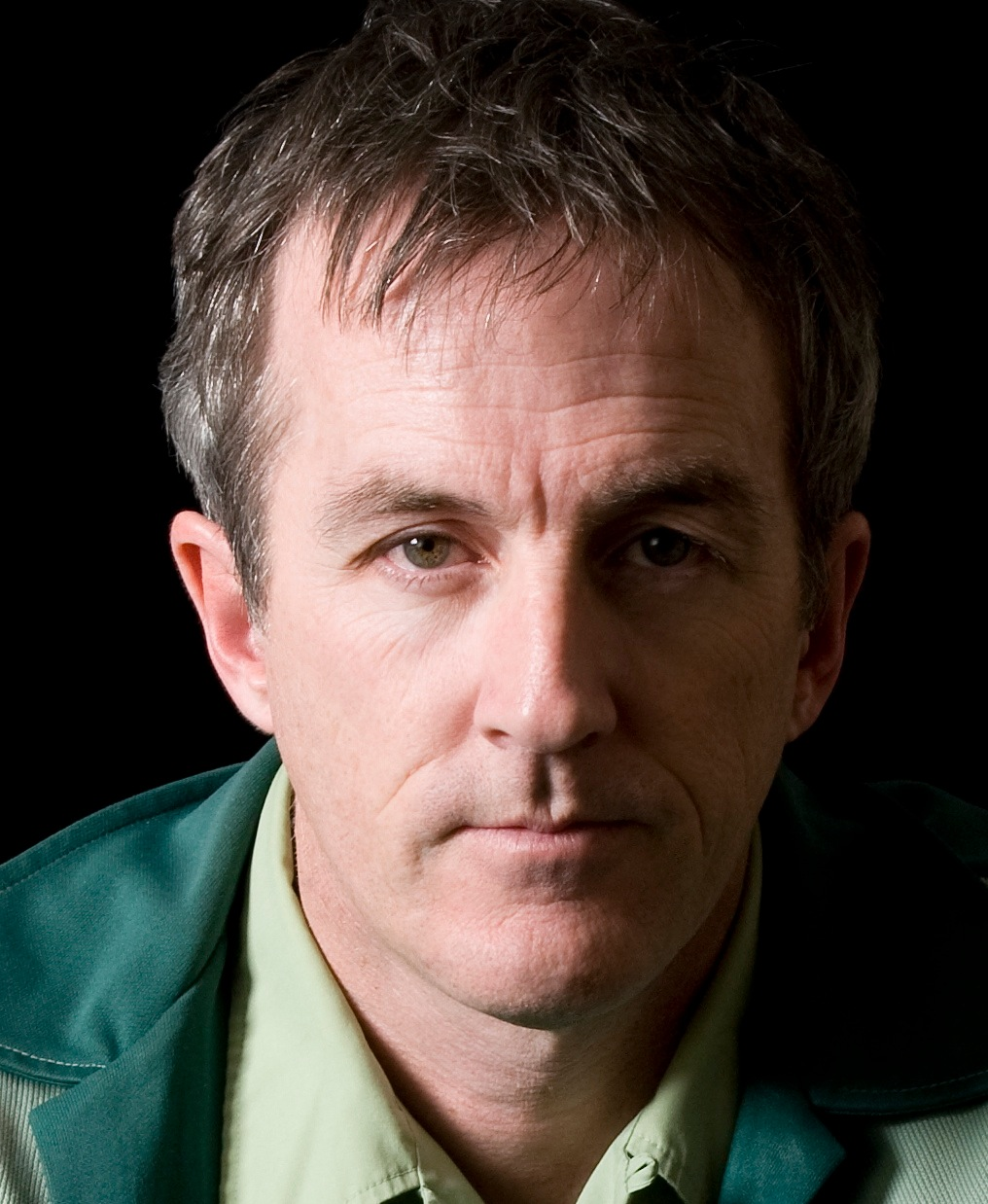
Luke Davies, Best Adapted Screenplay winner

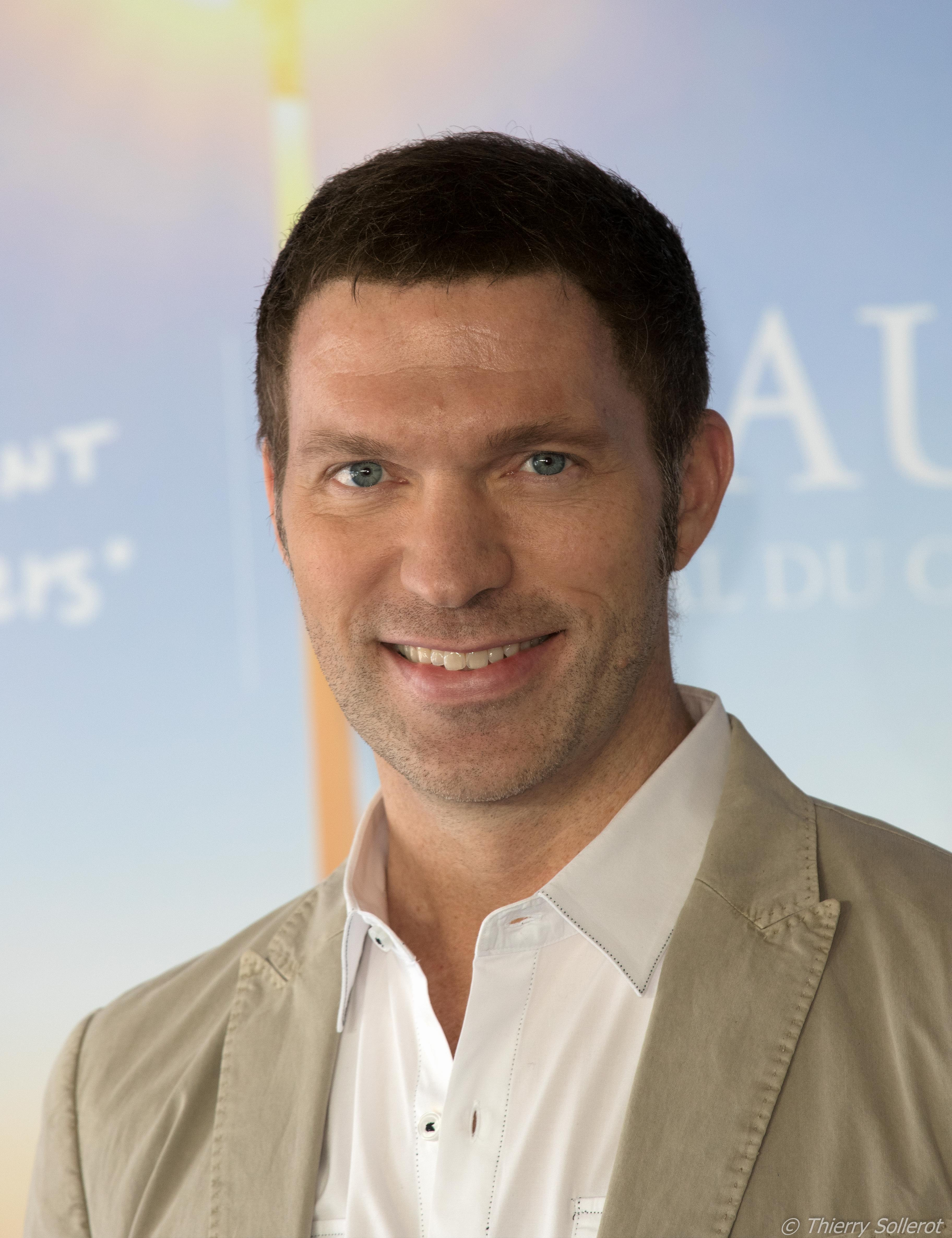
Travis Knight, Best Animated Film winner

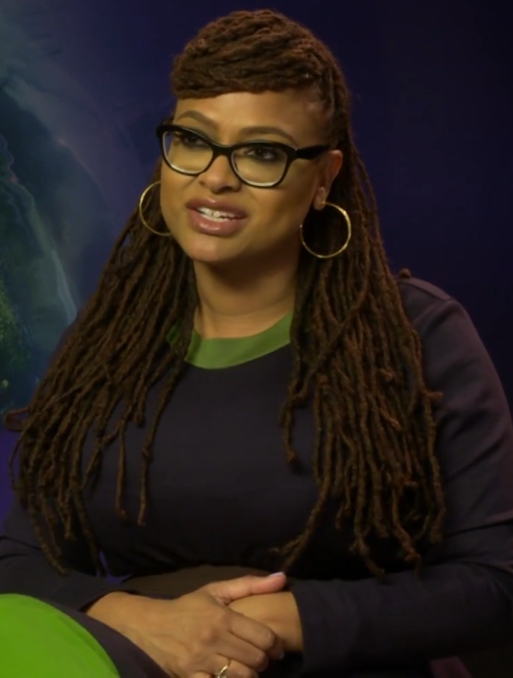
Ava DuVernay, Best Documentary co-winner

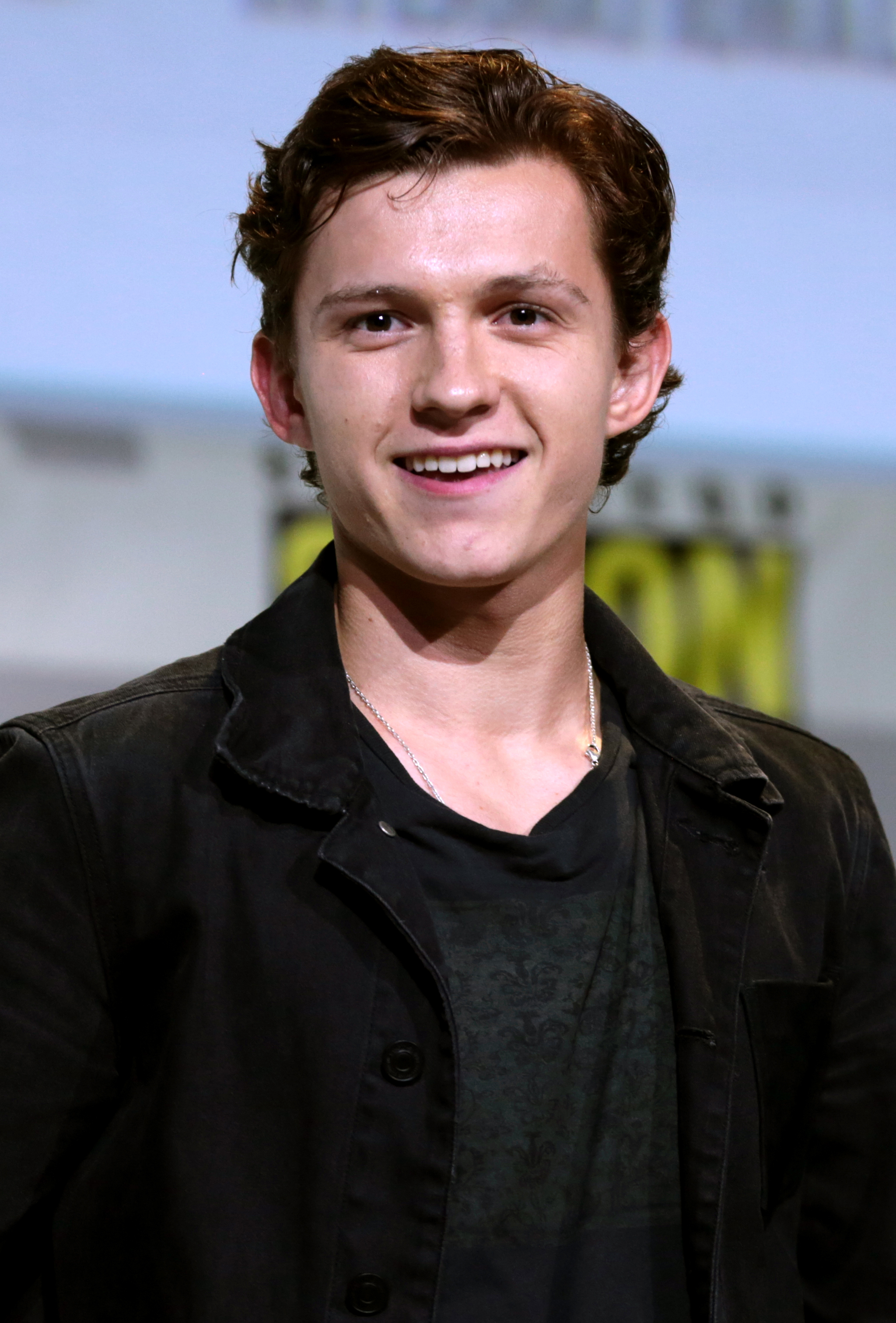
Tom Holland, Rising Star Award winner

The nominees were announced on 10 January 2017. The winners were announced on 12 February 2017.

=== BAFTA Fellowship ===
- Mel Brooks
- Joanna Lumley

=== Outstanding British Contribution to Cinema ===
- Curzon

Best Film: La La Land – Fred Berger, Jordan Horowitz and Marc Platt; Arrival – Dan Levine, Shawn Levy, David Linde and Aaron Ryder; I, Daniel Blake – Rebecca O'Brien; Manchester by the Sea – Lauren Beck, Matt Damon, Chris Moore, Kimberly Steward and Kevin J. Walsh; Moonlight – Dede Gardner, Jeremy Kleiner and Adele Romanski	Best Direction: Damien Chazelle – La La Land; Tom Ford – Nocturnal Animals; Ken Loach – I, Daniel Blake; Kenneth Lonergan – Manchester by the Sea; Denis Villeneuve – Arrival
Best Actor in a Leading Role: Casey Affleck – Manchester by the Sea as Lee Chandler; Andrew Garfield – Hacksaw Ridge as Desmond Doss; Ryan Gosling – La La Land as Sebastian Wilder; Jake Gyllenhaal – Nocturnal Animals as Edward Sheffield/Tony Hastings; Viggo Mortensen – Captain Fantastic as Ben Cash	Best Actress in a Leading Role: Emma Stone – La La Land as Mia Dolan; Amy Adams – Arrival as Louise Banks; Emily Blunt – The Girl on the Train as Rachel Watson; Natalie Portman – Jackie as Jacqueline Kennedy Onassis; Meryl Streep – Florence Foster Jenkins as Florence Foster Jenkins
Best Actor in a Supporting Role: Dev Patel – Lion as Saroo Brierley; Mahershala Ali – Moonlight as Juan; Jeff Bridges – Hell or High Water as Marcus Hamilton; Hugh Grant – Florence Foster Jenkins as St. Clair Bayfield; Aaron Taylor-Johnson – Nocturnal Animals as Ray Marcus	Best Actress in a Supporting Role: Viola Davis – Fences as Rose Lee Maxson; Naomie Harris – Moonlight as Paula; Nicole Kidman – Lion as Sue Brierley; Hayley Squires – I, Daniel Blake as Katie Morgan; Michelle Williams – Manchester by the Sea as Randi
Best Original Screenplay: Manchester by the Sea – Kenneth Lonergan; Hell or High Water – Taylor Sheridan; I, Daniel Blake – Paul Laverty; La La Land – Damien Chazelle; Moonlight – Barry Jenkins	Best Adapted Screenplay: Lion – Luke Davies; Arrival – Eric Heisserer; Hacksaw Ridge – Robert Schenkkan and Andrew Knight; Hidden Figures – Theodore Melfi and Allison Schroeder; Nocturnal Animals – Tom Ford
Best Cinematography: La La Land – Linus Sandgren; Arrival – Bradford Young; Hell or High Water – Giles Nuttgens; Lion – Greig Fraser; Nocturnal Animals – Seamus McGarvey	Best Costume Design: Jackie – Madeline Fontaine; Allied – Joanna Johnston; Fantastic Beasts and Where to Find Them – Colleen Atwood; Florence Foster Jenkins – Consolata Boyle; La La Land – Mary Zophres
Best Editing: Hacksaw Ridge – John Gilbert; Arrival – Joe Walker; La La Land – Tom Cross; Manchester by the Sea – Jennifer Lame; Nocturnal Animals – Joan Sobel	Best Makeup and Hair: Florence Foster Jenkins – J. Roy Helland and Daniel Phillips; Doctor Strange – Jeremy Woodhead; Hacksaw Ridge – Shane Thomas; Nocturnal Animals – Donald Mowat and Yolanda Toussieng; Rogue One: A Star Wars Story – Amanda Knight, Neal Scanlan and Lisa Tomblin
Best Original Music: La La Land – Justin Hurwitz; Arrival – Jóhann Jóhannsson; Jackie – Micachu; Lion – Dustin O'Halloran and Hauschka; Nocturnal Animals – Abel Korzeniowski	Best Production Design: Fantastic Beasts and Where to Find Them – Stuart Craig and Anna Pinnock; Doctor Strange – John Bush and Charles Wood; Hail, Caesar! – Jess Gonchor and Nancy Haigh; La La Land – Sandy Reynolds-Wasco and David Wasco; Nocturnal Animals – Shane Valentino and Meg Everist
Best Sound: Arrival – Claude La Haye, Bernard Gariépy Strobl and Sylvain Bellemare; Deepwater Horizon – Mike Prestwood Smith, Dror Mohar, Wylie Stateman, Renée Tondelli and David Wyman; Fantastic Beasts and Where to Find Them – Niv Adiri, Glenn Freemantle, Simon Hayes, Andy Nelson and Ian Tapp; Hacksaw Ridge – Peter Grace, Robert Mackenzie, Kevin O'Connell and Andy Wright; La La Land – Mildred Iatrou Morgan, Ai-Ling Lee, Steven A. Morrow and Andy Nelson	Best Special Visual Effects: The Jungle Book – Robert Legato, Dan Lemmon, Andrew R. Jones and Adam Valdez; Arrival – Louis Morin; Doctor Strange – Richard Bluff, Stephane Ceretti, Paul Corbould and Jonathan Fawkner; Fantastic Beasts and Where to Find Them – Tim Burke, Pablo Grillo, Christian Manz and David Watkins; Rogue One: A Star Wars Story – Neil Corbould, Hal Hickel, Mohen Leo, John Knoll and Nigel Summer
Outstanding British Film: I, Daniel Blake – Ken Loach, Rebecca O'Brien and Paul Laverty; American Honey – Andrea Arnold, Lars Knudsen, Pouya Shahbazian and Jay Van Hoy; Denial – Mick Jackson, Gary Foster, Russ Krasnoff and David Hare; Fantastic Beasts and Where to Find Them – David Yates, J. K. Rowling, David Heyman, Steve Kloves and Lionel Wigram; Notes on Blindness – Peter Middleton, James Spinney, Mike Brett, Jo-Jo Ellison and Steve Jamison; Under the Shadow – Babak Anvari, Emily Leo, Oliver Roskill and Lucan Toh	Outstanding Debut by a British Writer, Director or Producer: Under the Shadow – Babak Anvari (Writer/Director), Emily Leo, Oliver Roskill and Lucan Toh (Producer); The Girl with All the Gifts – Mike Carey (Writer) and Camille Gatin (Producer); The Hard Stop – George Amponsah (Writer/Director/Producer) and Dionne Walker (Writer/Producer); Notes on Blindness – Peter Middleton (Writer/Director/Producer), James Spinney (Writer/Director) and Jo-Jo Ellison (Producer); The Pass – John Donnelly (Writer) and Ben A. Williams (Director)
Best Short Animation: A Love Story – Khaled Gad, Anushko Kashani, Naanayakkara and Elena Ruscomble-King; The Alan Dimension – Jac Clinch, Jonathan Harbottle and Millie Marsh; Tough – Jennifer Zheng	Best Short Film: Home – Shpat Deda, Afolabi Kuti, Daniel Mulloy and Scott O. Donnell; Consumed – Richard John Seymour; Mouth of Hell – Bart Gavigan, Samir Mehanović, Allie Smith and Michael Wilson; The Party – Farah Abushwesha, Emmet Fleming, Andrea Harkin and Conor MacNeill; Standby – Charlotte Regan and Jack Hannon
Best Animated Film: Kubo and the Two Strings – Travis Knight; Finding Dory – Andrew Stanton; Moana – Ron Clements and John Musker; Zootopia – Byron Howard and Rich Moore	Best Documentary: 13th – Ava DuVernay, Spencer Averick and Howard Barish; The Beatles: Eight Days a Week – Ron Howard, Brian Grazer, Scott Pascucci and Nigel Sinclair; The Eagle Huntress – Otto Bell and Stacey Reiss; Notes on Blindness – Peter Middleton and James Spinney; Weiner – Josh Kriegman and Elyse Steinberg
Best Film Not in the English Language: Son of Saul – László Nemes and Gabor Sipos; Dheepan – Jacques Audiard and Pascal Caucheteux; Julieta – Pedro Almodóvar and Agustín Almodóvar; Mustang – Deniz Gamze Ergüven and Charles Gillibert; Toni Erdmann – Maren Ade and Janine Jackowski	Rising Star Award: Tom Holland; Laia Costa; Lucas Hedges; Ruth Negga; Anya Taylor-Joy

== Ceremony information ==
The ceremony was broadcast on BBC One at 9 p.m. UTC, around two hours later than the actual ceremony. For the 12th time, Stephen Fry acted as the host. The ceremony returned to the Royal Albert Hall for the first time since 1997, as the Royal Opera House, which has hosted the awards since 2008, was being refurbished.

Following criticism at the lack of representation of ethnic minorities from the previous ceremony, BAFTA had announced steps to increase diversity across the industry, on both sides of the camera. However, there was again criticism at the lack of representation of Black, Asian and minority ethnic (BAME) actors, directors and films in the nominations. In the leading actor, actress and director fields, there were no BAME nominees, with the omission of director Barry Jenkins for Moonlight and actor/director Denzel Washington for Fences highlighted as particularly noteworthy.

La La Land won the most awards at the event, winning five—Best Picture, Best Director for Damien Chazelle, Best Actress in a Leading Role for Emma Stone, Best Cinematography for Linus Sandgren, and Best Original Music for Justin Hurwitz. Casey Affleck won Best Actor in a Leading Role for Manchester by the Sea, Dev Patel won Best Actor in a Supporting Role for Lion, and Viola Davis won Best Actress in a Supporting Role for Fences.

Cellist Sheku Kanneh-Mason performed a solo interpretation of Leonard Cohen's "Hallelujah" to accompany the In Memoriam section. Those remembered were Gene Wilder, Garry Marshall, Sue Gibson, Kenny Baker, Tony Dyson, Peter Shaffer, Paul Lewis, Michael White, Ken Adam, Guy Hamilton, Debbie Reynolds, Carrie Fisher, Abbas Kiarostami, Jim Clark, Simon Relph, Douglas Slocombe, Anton Yelchin, Robin Hardy, David Rose, Curtis Hanson, Clare Wise, Om Puri, Alec McCowen, Emmanuelle Riva, Andrzej Wajda, Michael Cimino, Antony Gibbs and Sir John Hurt.

== Statistics ==
Films that received multiple nominations
Nominations	Film
11	La La Land
9	Arrival
9	Nocturnal Animals
6	Manchester by the Sea
5	Fantastic Beasts and Where to Find Them
5	Hacksaw Ridge
5	I, Daniel Blake
5	Lion
4	Florence Foster Jenkins
4	Moonlight
3	Doctor Strange
3	Hell or High Water
3	Jackie
3	Notes on Blindness
2	Rogue One: A Star Wars Story
2	Under the Shadow

Films that received multiple awards
Awards	Film
5	La La Land
2	Lion
2	Manchester by the Sea

== In Memoriam ==
- Gene Wilder
- Garry Marshall
- Sue Gibson
- Kenny Baker
- Tony Dyson
- Peter Shaffer
- Paul Cowan
- Michael White
- Ken Adam
- Guy Hamilton
- Debbie Reynolds
- Carrie Fisher
- Abbas Kiarostami
- Jim Clark
- Simon Relph
- Douglas Slocombe
- Anton Yelchin
- Robin Hardy
- David Rose
- Curtis Hanson
- Clare Wise
- Om Puri
- Alec McCowen
- Emmanuelle Riva
- Andrzej Wajda
- Michael Cimino
- Tony Gibbs
- John Hurt

== See also ==
- 6th AACTA International Awards
- 89th Academy Awards
- 42nd César Awards
- 22nd Critics' Choice Awards
- 69th Directors Guild of America Awards
- 30th European Film Awards
- 74th Golden Globe Awards
- 37th Golden Raspberry Awards
- 31st Goya Awards
- 32nd Independent Spirit Awards
- 22nd Lumière Awards
- 7th Magritte Awards
- 4th Platino Awards
- 28th Producers Guild of America Awards
- 21st Satellite Awards
- 43rd Saturn Awards
- 23rd Screen Actors Guild Awards
- 69th Writers Guild of America Awards
