= The True Adventures of Wolfboy =

2019 American coming-of-age film

- Theatrical release poster
- Directed by: Martin Krejčí
- Screenplay by: Olivia Dufault
- Produced by: Declan Baldwin; Lauren Beck; Benjamin Blake; Josh Godfrey; Kimberly Steward
- Starring: Jaeden Martell; Chris Messina; Eve Hewson; Sophie Giannamore; Chloë Sevigny; John Turturro; Nick Pulinski
- Cinematography: Andrew Droz Palermo
- Edited by: Joseph Krings
- Music by: Nick Urata
- Production companies: K Period Media; Big Indie Pictures; Legacy Effects
- Distributed by: Vertical Entertainment
- Release dates: July 2, 2019 (KVIFF); October 30, 2020 (United States)
- Running time: 88 minutes
- Country: United States
- Language: English
- Box office: $1,189

The True Adventures of Wolfboy is a 2019 American coming-of-age fantasy film directed by Martin Krejčí and written by Olivia Dufault. The film stars Jaeden Martell, Chris Messina, Eve Hewson, Chloë Sevigny, John Turturro, Nick Pulinski and Sophie Giannamore. It tells the story of a teenage boy with hypertrichosis, who leaves home to find his mother while befriending a "mermaid" transgender girl, named Aristiana.

It had its world premiere at the Karlovy Vary International Film Festival on July 2, 2019, and was released on October 30, 2020, by Vertical Entertainment.

== Premise ==
A teenage boy named Paul Harker has a skin condition that causes his skin to grow werewolf-like fur and hair all around it. He runs away from home and his father, Denny in the search for his estranged mother. After a brief stint with the exploiting amusement park owner Mr. Silk, in order to fund his travels, Paul befriends a "mermaid" transgender girl and an aspiring singer, named Aristiana, who becomes his companion as Denny, Mr. Silk and detective Pollok each pursue him.

== Cast ==
- Jaeden Martell as Paul Harker, a boy with hypertrichosis.
- Sophie Giannamore as Aristiana, a "mermaid" transgender girl and aspiring singer who befriends Paul.
- Chris Messina as Denny Harker, Paul's father who sets out to find his son when he goes missing.
- Eve Hewson as Rose, a bar patron in an eyepatch who knows Aristiana and later joins Paul in his journey.
- Chloë Sevigny as Jen, Paul's estranged mother.
- John Turturro as Mr. Silk, an amusement park owner who exploits Paul's condition for money and later tracks him across the country.
- Nick Pulinski as Percy, the leader of Paul's bullies from school.
- Michelle Wilson as Pollok, a detective who helps Denny find Paul.
- Stephen McKinley Henderson as Nicholas, Paul's estranged grandfather who lives with Jen and also suffers from hypertrichosis.
- Melissa Mandisa as Aristiana's mother, an ignorant but concerned parent.
- JJ Alfieri as Gas Station Clerk
- Bill Smith and Joshua R. Aragon as the Carnival Patrons
- Bob Rusch and Greg Hinaman as the Clowns
- Margo Davis as Mom
- Kristy Nolen as Percy's mother
- Sheri Fairchild as Jezebel the Laughing Clown
- Mikey Tenerelli as Larry "Hairy Larry"
- Colin Patrick Farrell as Buck, one of Paul's bullies from school.

== Production ==
Principal photography for the film began in mid-September 2017 in the Buffalo Niagara Region.

== Release ==
It had its world premiere at the Karlovy Vary International Film Festival on July 2, 2019. In September 2020, Vertical Entertainment acquired U.S. distribution rights to the film. They released it on October 30, 2020.

== Critical reception ==
On review aggregation website Rotten Tomatoes, the film holds an approval rating of 78% based on 50 reviews, with an average rating of 6.6/10. The site's critics' consensus reads, "The True Adventures of Wolfboy can be frustratingly uneven, but a worthy story and compassion for its characters help make this coming-of-age story's flaws easy to forgive." Albert Nowicki of Filmawka called the film "charming", and believed it should be applauded for its inclusion of both the transgender character (Aristiana) and trans actress (Sophie Giannamore).

=== Accolades ===
The True Adventures of Wolfboy was nominated for the 2021 GLAAD Media Award for Outstanding Film (Limited Release).
