= Mary Mallen =

American actress and singer

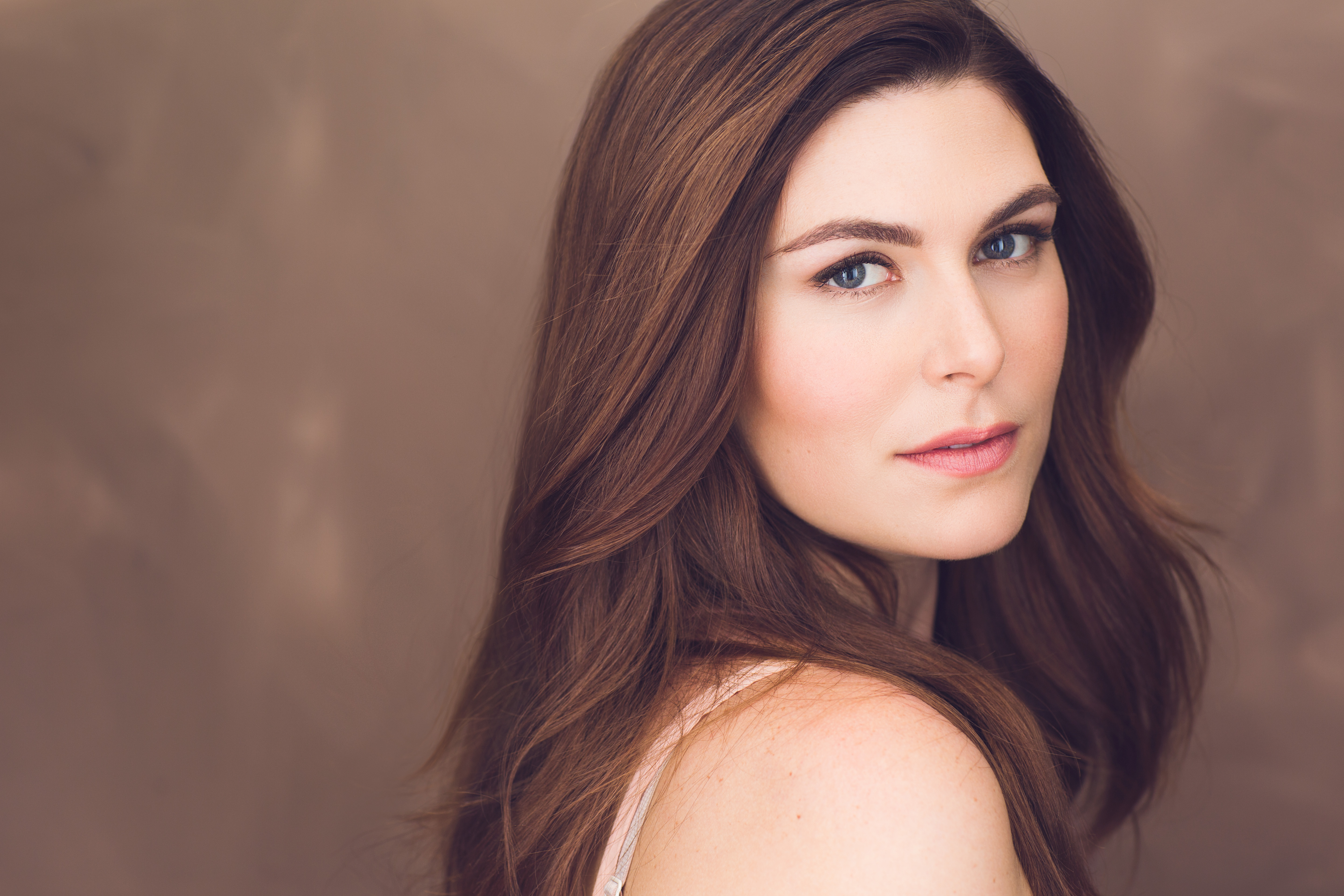
- Born: Mary Catherine Mallen; Boston, Massachusetts, U.S.
- Known for: Manchester by the Sea
- Website: MaryMallen.com

Mary Catherine Mallen is an American actress and singer. Since graduating from The Royal Academy of Dramatic Art, she has appeared in various theatrical productions. She also acted as Sharon in Kenneth Lonergan’s film Manchester by the Sea.

== Early life ==
Mary Mallen was born in Boston, Massachusetts, the daughter of Julie and Joseph Mallen. She began acting at the age of eight in local theatrical productions and commercials around the Greater Boston area.

Mary attended the Middlesex School in Concord, Massachusetts, where she performed in many of the school's productions, including as Cinderella in Into the Woods, Fantine in Les Misérables, and Lucille in A Flea in Her Ear. She currently resides in New York City.

== Career ==
Mallen was selected to attend the Royal Academy of Dramatic Art (RADA) in London, where she received her B.A. Hons in Acting. After graduating from RADA, she understudied on Connor McPherson’s original production of The Veil at the National Theatre. She performed the role of "Mibs" in A Life at the Finborough Theatre. In 2013, she moved from London to New York City and appeared in the musical Donnybrook! at the Irish Repertory Theatre, playing the role of Esme. She returned to the Irish Repertory Theatre in production of Juno and the Paycock, in which a reviewer for The New York Times described her work as "the standout performance" as Mary Boyle.

Mallen appeared as Sharon in writer-director Kenneth Lonergan's Manchester by the Sea, which premiered at the 2016 Sundance Film Festival.
