= Sophie Giannamore =

American actress

Sophie Giannamore, formerly Sophia Grace Gianna, is an American actress, internet personality, and LGBTQ activist. In 2018, she was featured in an episode of The Good Doctor. In 2019, she had a main role in The True Adventures of Wolfboy and a recurring role in The L Word: Generation Q.

== Early life ==
In 2016, Giannamore made her acting debut at the age of 12 in Transparent playing the young version of Maura Pfefferman. In 2017, she was featured in the short film The Real Thing.

== Career ==
In 2018, she starred in an episode of The Good Doctor which was initially well-received. However, clips of Giannamore's character being repeatedly misgendered gained attention amid criticisms of the show's representation of autism.

In 2019, Giannamore starred in The True Adventures of Wolfboy as Artistiana, a transgender mermaid. From 2019 to 2023, she played the recurring character of Jordi Sanbolino in The L Word: Generation Q.
