= Echo Valley (film) =

Film by Michael Pearce

- Promotional poster
- Directed by: Michael Pearce
- Written by: Brad Ingelsby
- Produced by: Ridley Scott; Michael Pruss; Brad Ingelsby; Kevin J. Walsh
- Starring: Julianne Moore; Sydney Sweeney; Fiona Shaw; Kyle MacLachlan; Domhnall Gleeson
- Cinematography: Benjamin Kračun
- Edited by: Maya Maffioli
- Music by: Jed Kurzel
- Production companies: Apple Studios; Scott Free Productions; Black Bicycle Entertainment; The Walsh Company
- Distributed by: Apple TV+
- Release dates: June 6, 2025 (United States); June 13, 2025 (Apple TV+)
- Running time: 104 minutes
- Country: United States
- Language: English

Echo Valley is a 2025 American thriller film directed by Michael Pearce and written by Brad Ingelsby. The film stars Julianne Moore, Sydney Sweeney, Fiona Shaw, Kyle MacLachlan, and Domhnall Gleeson. Its plot follows a horse trainer who, while living a quiet life on a Pennsylvania farm, must aid her daughter who has come to her in an alarming state.

Echo Valley received a limited theatrical release in the United States and Canada on June 6, 2025; ahead of being released on Apple TV+ on June 13.

== Plot ==
Kate Garrett works as a horse trainer on her farm, Echo Valley, in southern Pennsylvania. Kate is reeling from the loss of her wife, Patty, who died in a riding accident, and is struggling to make ends meet with the operation of the farm. She seeks financial help from her ex-husband, Richard, an attorney, who gives her the $9000 she needs to replace her roof but chastises Kate for squandering her money to help their daughter, Claire, a troubled drug addict who has been in and out of rehab.

One night, Claire returns to the farm unexpectedly to visit her mother. Their reunion is interrupted when Claire's boyfriend Ryan arrives and the two have an argument, after which Claire leaves with him. Later, when Claire is on the farm, she is confronted by Jackie Lawson, a violent drug dealer who is seeking repayment from Claire after she inadvertently threw a stash of his drugs into a river. Jackie physically assaults Claire, but Kate intervenes and threatens to call the police. An unstable Claire flees with Ryan, telling Kate the two are going to camp for a few days.

Several nights later, Claire returns home in a bloodied shirt, and confesses that she killed Ryan during an argument by pushing him and causing him to hit his head on a rock. In Claire's car, Kate finds a corpse wrapped tightly in a sheet. Desperate to protect Claire, Kate drives the body to a nearby lake to dispose of it, weighing it down with a cinder block. She returns home, assuring Claire she has taken care of the matter. Some time later, after Kate pays Jackie his sum of money, Claire disappears from the farm. When Kate goes to search for Claire, she finds her with Ryan. A shocked Kate asks Claire whose body she disposed of, but Ryan pushes her to the ground before fleeing with Claire in his car. Kate struggles to maintain her composure and seeks emotional support from her friend, Leslie.

Jackie arrives again at the farm one day, threatening to extort Kate over her disposal of the body, whom she learns was that of a local addict, Greg Kaminski, who overdosed on fentanyl Ryan dealt him (supplied by Jackie). Claire, aware that her mother would cover for her, manipulated her into disposing of the remains. Jackie drugs Kate by sticking her with a hypodermic needle. Kate comes up with a plot to burn down the barn for insurance money. As a cover, Jackie temporarily stays in the apartment above the barn, posing as Kate's newly-hired farmhand. Late one night, Jackie watches as Kate lights the barn on fire with a road flare before he flees in his car.

The following morning, Kate is questioned by police, who inform her that the charred remains of a body were found in the rubble. Kate suggests they could be that of Greg Kaminski, whom she says was a friend of Jackie. Jackie, who denied knowing Kate, is brought in for questioning. It is revealed that Kate, with Leslie's help, had retrieved Greg's body from the lake, and placed it in the barn's apartment just after Kate started the fire, effectively framing Jackie. Kate intentionally left behind a metal pin from the road flare, which Jackie was seen purchasing via store camera monitors; police assume Greg overdosed inside the apartment, and that Jackie started the blaze to cover up his death.

Kate is cleared of suspicion, while Jackie is charged with the crime. Back at the farm, Kate hires a crew to bulldoze and remove the rubble from the barn. Late one night, Kate is awakened by her dog barking, and finds Claire crying outside on the front porch. The two stare at one another through the front door window. It is left unknown if Kate will open the door.

== Cast ==
- Julianne Moore as Kate Garrett
- Sydney Sweeney as Claire Garrett, Kate and Richard's daughter
- Fiona Shaw as Leslie Oliver, Kate's friend
- Kyle MacLachlan as Richard Garrett, Claire's father
- Domhnall Gleeson as Jackie Lawson
- Edmund Donovan as Ryan
- Albert Jones as Detective Ballard
- Melanie Nicholls-King as Joan
- Katya Campbell as Audrey
- Rebecca Creskoff as Emma Hanway
- John Finn as Randy
- Kristina Valada-Viars as Patty, Kate's deceased wife

== Production ==
=== Development and casting ===
The film was announced in March 2023, with Brad Ingelsby writing and Michael Pearce directing. It was produced by Scott Free Productions and The Walsh Company, with Ridley Scott, Michael Pruss, Ingelsby, and Kevin J. Walsh as producers, with Sydney Sweeney, and Julianne Moore set to star in the film. In April 2023 Domhnall Gleeson was also added to the cast. In May 2024, Kyle MacLachlan, Fiona Shaw and Edmund Donovan were announced for the cast.

=== Filming ===
Principal photography commenced in New Jersey in May 2023, under the title Wildvale, and concluded in late June. Filming locations include Hunterdon County and Morris County. Production also occurred in the Underwater Stage at Pinewood Studios.

== Release ==
It was released in select theaters in the United States on June 6, 2025, before being added to Apple TV+ on June 13.

== Reception ==
On the review aggregator website Rotten Tomatoes, 53% of 93 critics' reviews are positive, with an average rating of 5.8/10. The website's consensus reads: "Julianne Moore's committed turn and the relatable premise of how far a parent will go for their child gives Echo Valley some high peaks, but soporific plotting sends it sloping back down to routine territory." Metacritic, which uses a weighted average, assigned the film a score of 54 out of 100, based on 22 critics, indicating "mixed or average" reviews.
