= Kevin J. Walsh =

American film producer

- Born: Kevin James Walsh
- Education: Lafayette College
- Occupations: Film and TV Producer
- Spouse: Valaer van Roijen
- Children: 1

Kevin J. Walsh is an American film and TV producer. Walsh is best known for producing the critically acclaimed films Napoleon, House of Gucci, and Manchester by the Sea, in which he earned an Academy Award nomination for Best Picture with Matt Damon, Kimberly Steward, Chris Moore, and Lauren Beck. The film received 18 major award nominations and won two Academy Awards.

In 2022, Walsh began a multi-year deal with Apple TV+ to produce film and television for the studio under his banner, The Walsh Company. His first films to be released for Apple TV+ are Napoleon, directed by Ridley Scott and starring Joaquin Phoenix and Vanessa Kirby; The Instigators directed by Doug Liman and starring Matt Damon, Casey Affleck, and Hong Chau; and Echo Valley, directed by Michael Pearce starring Julianne Moore and Sydney Sweeney.

Prior to his deal with Apple TV+, Walsh was the President of Scott Free Productions, a film and television production company established by Ridley Scott and Tony Scott in 1995. At Scott Free, Walsh produced a dozen films in the six years that he oversaw the film group, including Boston Strangler, Death on the Nile, House of Gucci, The Last Duel, Earthquake Bird, Our Friend, American Woman and All the Money in the World.

Walsh got his start in the film business working as an assistant to Scott Rudin on seven films including Zoolander, The Hours, and The Royal Tenenbaums. He later worked for Steven Spielberg on multiple films including Munich, The Adventures of Tintin, and War of the Worlds. Walsh was also cast as an actor in The Master.

== Filmography ==
=== Upcoming films ===
Year	Title	Director	Distributor	Status
2026	Being Heumann	Sian Heder	Apple TV	Completed
TBA	Liminal	Louis Leterrier	Apple Original Films	Filming

=== Released Films ===
Year	Title	Director	RT	Role
2013	The Way, Way Back	Nat Faxon and Jim Rash	84%	Producer
2016	Manchester by the Sea	Kenneth Lonergan	96%	Producer
2017	Thoroughbreds	Cory Finley	87%	Producer
2017	All the Money in the World	Ridley Scott	79%	Producer
2018	American Woman	Jake Scott	89%	Producer
2018	Zoe	Drake Doremus	32%	Producer
2019	Our Friend	Gabriela Cowperthwaite	86%	Producer
2019	Jungleland	Max Winkler	74%	Producer
2019	Earthquake Bird	Wash Westmoreland	49%	Producer
2021	Naked Singularity	Chase Palmer	28%	Producer
2021	The Last Duel	Ridley Scott	85%	Producer
2021	House of Gucci	Ridley Scott	61%	Producer
2022	Death on the Nile	Kenneth Branagh	62%	Producer
2023	Boston Strangler	Matt Ruskin	68%	Producer
2023	Napoleon	Ridley Scott	61%	Producer
2024	The Instigators	Doug Liman	42%	Producer
2025	Echo Valley	Michael Pearce	52%	Producer
2026	Miss You, Love You	Jim Rash	88%	Producer

=== Acting ===
Year	Title	Role
2012	The Master	Cliff Boyd
2012	Lincoln	House of Representatives
2013	Arrested Development	Pitch Man

=== Miscellaneous crew ===
Year	Title	Role
2001	Zoolander	Assistant: Scott Rudin
2001	The Royal Tenenbaums	Executive assistant: Scott Rudin
2001	Iris	Executive assistant: Scott Rudin
2002	Orange County	Executive assistant: Scott Rudin
2002	Changing Lanes	Assistant: Scott Rudin
2002	The Hours	Assistant: Scott Rudin
2003	Marci X	Assistant: Scott Rudin
2005	War of the Worlds	Set production assistant
2005	Goal!	Set production assistant: Los Angeles
2011	The Adventures of Tintin	Volume coordinator

=== Writing ===
Year	Title
TBA	The Leaves

=== Assistant Director ===
Year	Title	Role
2004	Mickybo and Me	Assistant director
2005	Munich	Third assistant director

=== Television ===
Year	Title	Credit	Notes
2014	Fatrick	Executive Producer	Television pilot

== Awards and nominations ==
- Highlighted accolades received by Napoleon
  - 3 Academy Award Nominations
  - 4 BFI Award Nominations
  - AACTA Award Win for Best Supporting Actress
  - Critics Choice Award Nomination for Best Costume Design
- Highlighted accolades received by Manchester by the Sea
  - 6 Academy Award Nominations and 2 Wins
  - Named Best Film by National Board of Review
  - 6 BAFTA Nominations and 2 Wins
  - 8 Critics' Choice Award Nominations and 3 Wins
  - 5 Golden Globe Award Nominations and 1 Win
  - PGA Award Nomination for Outstanding Producer of Theatrical Motion Pictures
- Highlighted accolades received by House of Gucci
  - Academy Award Nominee for Best Achievement in Makeup and Hair Styling
  - Golden Globe Nomination for Best Actress in a Motion Picture Drama for Lady Gaga
  - 3 BAFTA Nominations, including Outstanding British Film of the Year
  - 4 Critics' Choice Award Nominations
  - 3 SAG Award Nominations
- Highlighted accolades received by All the Money in the World
  - Academy Award Nomination for Best Supporting Actor for Christopher Plummer
  - 3 Golden Globe Nominations
  - BAFTA Nomination for Best Supporting Actor for Christopher Plummer
- Highlighted accolades received by Thoroughbreds
  - Independent Spirit Award Nomination for Best First Screenplay
  - AFI Fest Award Nomination
- Highlighted accolades received by The Way Way Back
  - 3 Critics' Choice Award Nominations, including Best Comedy
