= Lauren Beck =

American film producer

Lauren Beck is an American film producer, best known for producing the critically acclaimed film Manchester by the Sea (2016), which earned her an Academy Award for Best Picture nomination with Matt Damon, Kimberly Steward, Chris Moore, and Kevin J. Walsh.

== Filmography ==
She was a producer in all films unless otherwise noted.

=== Film ===
Year	Film	Credit
2016	Manchester by the Sea	
2018	Suspiria	Executive producer
2019	The True Adventures of Wolfboy	

Production manager

Year	Film	Role
2018	Patient 001	Post-production supervisor

Thanks

Year	Film	Role
2017	How to Talk to Girls at Parties	Special thanks

== Awards and nominations ==
- Nominated: Academy Award for Best Picture - Manchester by the Sea
