= Kimberly Steward =

American film producer

- Born: United States
- Occupation: Film producer
- Known for: Producer of Manchester by the Sea
- Parent(s): David Steward and Thelma Steward

Kimberly Steward is an American film producer known for such films as Through a Lens Darkly: Black Photographers and the Emergence of a People (2014). She also produced Manchester by the Sea in 2016 through her production company, K Period Media, in which she was nominated for an Academy Award. Steward is a member of the board of trustees of the Academy Museum of Motion Pictures.

Steward is the daughter of billionaire businessman David Steward, founder of the systems integration firm World Wide Technology.

== Filmography ==
She was a producer in all films unless otherwise noted.

=== Film ===
Year	Film	Credit
2016	Manchester by the Sea	
2018	Suspiria	Executive producer
2019	The True Adventures of Wolfboy	
2020	Topside	Executive producer
2023	The Accidental Getaway Driver	
2024	Caddo Lake	Executive producer
TBA	Pieces of Us	

Thanks

Year	Film	Role
2017	How to Talk to Girls at Parties	Special thanks

=== Television ===
Year	Title	Credit	Notes
2015	Independent Lens	Executive producer	Documentary
