= List of awards and nominations received by Damien Chazelle =

Damien Chazelle awards and nominations
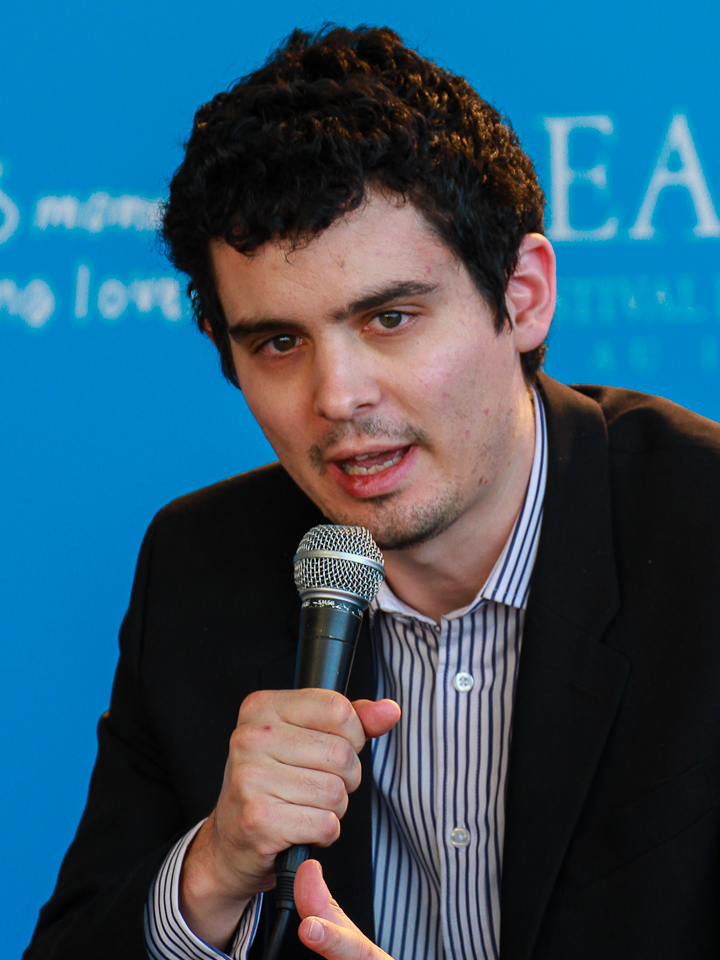
- Chazelle at the 2014 Deauville American Film Festival
Awards and nominations
Award	Wins	Nominations
Golden Globe	2	2
Academy Awards	1	3
BAFTA Awards	1	4

This is a list of awards and nominations received by American director and screenwriter Damien Chazelle.

Chazelle made his directorial debut with the musical Guy and Madeline on a Park Bench (2009). He wrote and directed his second feature film, Whiplash (2014), based on his award-winning 2013 short film of the same name. The film premiered at the 2014 Sundance Film Festival as the opening film where it won the U.S. Grand Jury Prize: Dramatic and Audience Award: U.S. Dramatic and went on to receive five Academy Award nominations, including Best Picture, winning three with Chazelle himself nominated for Best Adapted Screenplay.

He is also known for co-writing 10 Cloverfield Lane, and writing and directing La La Land, both released in 2016. For La La Land, he was nominated for several awards including two Academy Awards for Best Original Screenplay and Best Director, Directors Guild of America Award for Best Director, Writers Guild of America Award for Best Original Screenplay, two BAFTA Awards for Best Original Screenplay and Best Director and won two Critics' Choice Movie Award for Best Screenplay and Best Director and also two Golden Globe Award for Best Screenplay and Best Director, with the film itself receiving a record-breaking seven Golden Globes at the 74th Golden Globe Awards.

At 32, Chazelle is the youngest person to win the Academy Award and Golden Globe Award for Best Director.

== Major associations ==
=== Academy Awards ===
Year	Category	Nominated work	Result	Ref.
2015	Best Adapted Screenplay	Whiplash	Nominated	
2017	Best Director	La La Land	Won	
2017	Best Original Screenplay	La La Land	Nominated	

=== British Academy of Film and Television Arts Awards ===
Year	Category	Nominated work	Result	Ref.
2015	Best Direction	Whiplash	Nominated	
2015	Best Original Screenplay	Whiplash	Nominated	
2017	Best Direction	La La Land	Won	
2017	Best Original Screenplay	La La Land	Nominated	

=== Directors Guild of America Award ===
Year	Category	Nominated work	Result	Ref.
2017	Outstanding Directing – Feature Film	La La Land	Won	

=== Golden Globe Awards ===
Year	Category	Nominated work	Result	Ref.
2017	Best Director – Motion Picture	La La Land	Won	
2017	Best Screenplay – Motion Picture	La La Land	Won	

== Other awards and nominations ==
=== AACTA International Awards ===
Year	Category	Nominated work	Result	Ref.
2015	Best Direction	Whiplash	Nominated	
2015	Best Screenplay	Whiplash	Nominated	
2017	Best Direction	La La Land	Nominated	
2017	Best Screenplay	La La Land	Nominated	

=== Alliance of Women Film Journalists ===
Year	Category	Nominated work	Result	Ref.
2017	Best Director	La La Land	Nominated	
2017	Best Original Screenplay	La La Land	Nominated	

=== Aspen Shortsfest ===
Year	Category	Nominated work	Result	Ref.
2013	Short Film Prize	Whiplash (Short)	Won	

=== Austin Film Critics Association ===
Year	Category	Nominated work	Result	Ref.
2016	Best Director	La La Land	Nominated	
2016	Best Original Screenplay	La La Land	Nominated	

=== Boston Society of Film Critics ===
Year	Category	Nominated work	Result	Ref.
2016	Best Director	La La Land	Won	

=== Bram Stoker Awards ===
Year	Category	Nominated work	Result	Ref.
2016	Best Screenplay	10 Cloverfield Lane	Nominated	

=== Calgary International Film Festival ===
Year	Category	Nominated work	Result	Ref.
2009	Maverick Award	Guy and Madeline on a Park Bench	Nominated	
2014	Best Narrative Feature	Whiplash	Won	

=== Camerimage Awards ===
Year	Category	Nominated work	Result	Ref.
2014	Best Directorial Debut	Whiplash	Nominated	

=== Cannes Film Festival ===
Year	Category	Nominated work	Result	Ref.
2014	Queer Palm Award	Whiplash	Nominated	

=== Capri Hollywood International Film Festival ===
Year	Category	Nominated work	Result	Ref.
2016	Best Picture	La La Land	Won	

=== Chicago Film Critics Association ===
Year	Category	Nominated work	Result	Ref.
2014	Best Original Screenplay	Whiplash	Nominated	
2014	Most Promising Filmmaker	Whiplash	Won	
2016	Best Director	La La Land	Nominated	

=== Critics' Choice Movie Awards ===
Year	Category	Nominated work	Result	Ref.
2015	Best Original Screenplay	Whiplash	Nominated	
2016	Best Director	La La Land	Won	
2016	Best Screenplay	La La Land	Won	
2018	Best Director	First Man	Nominated	
2022	Best Director	Babylon	Nominated	

=== Denver Film Critics Society ===
Year	Category	Nominated work	Result	Ref.
2015	Best Original Screenplay	Whiplash	Nominated	
2017	Best Director	La La Land	Nominated	
2017	Best Original Screenplay	La La Land	Nominated	

=== Denver International Film Festival ===
Year	Category	Nominated work	Result	Ref.
2009	Emerging Filmmaker Award	Guy and Madeline on a Park Bench	Won	

=== Detroit Film Critics Society ===
Year	Category	Nominated work	Result	Ref.
2014	Breakthrough Artist	Whiplash	Won	
2014	Best Director	Whiplash	Won	
2014	Best Screenplay	Whiplash	Won	
2016	Best Director	La La Land	Won	

=== Florida Film Critics Circle ===
Year	Category	Nominated work	Result	Ref.
2014	Pauline Kael Breakout Award	Whiplash	Won	
2016	Best Director	La La Land	Won	
2016	Best Screenplay	La La Land	Nominated	

=== Gaudí Awards ===
Year	Category	Nominated work	Result	Ref.
2014	Best Non-Catalan Language Film	Grand Piano	Nominated	

=== Gotham Awards ===
Year	Category	Nominated work	Result	Ref.
2009	Best Film Not Playing at a Theater Near You	Guy and Madeline on a Park Bench	Nominated	

=== Hamptons International Film Festival ===
Year	Category	Nominated work	Result	Ref.
2016	Audience Award: Best Narrative Feature	La La Land	Won	

=== Houston Film Critics Society ===
Year	Category	Nominated work	Result	Ref.
2015	Best Director	Whiplash	Nominated	
2015	Best Screenplay	Whiplash	Nominated	
2017	Best Director	La La Land	Won	
2017	Best Screenplay	La La Land	Nominated	

=== Independent Spirit Awards ===
Year	Category	Nominated work	Result	Ref.
2015	Best Director	Whiplash	Nominated	

=== London Film Critics' Circle ===
Year	Category	Nominated work	Result	Ref.
2015	Screenwriter of the Year	Whiplash	Won	
2017	Director of the Year	La La Land	Nominated	
2017	Screenwriter of the Year	La La Land	Nominated	

=== Los Angeles Film Critics Association ===
Year	Category	Nominated work	Result	Ref.
2016	Best Director	La La Land	Nominated	

=== Mill Valley Film Festival ===
Year	Category	Nominated work	Result	Ref.
2014	Audience Award (Best U.S. Feature Film)	Whiplash	Won	

=== MTV Movie Awards ===
Year	Category	Nominated work	Result	Ref.
2015	Best Movie	Whiplash	Nominated	

=== National Society of Film Critics ===
Year	Category	Nominated work	Result	Ref.
2017	Best Director	La La Land	Nominated	

=== Online Film Critics Society ===
Year	Category	Nominated work	Result	Ref.
2014	Best Original Screenplay	Whiplash	Nominated	
2016	Best Director	La La Land	Nominated	
2016	Best Original Screenplay	La La Land	Nominated	

=== San Diego Film Critics Society ===
Year	Category	Nominated work	Result	Ref.
2016	Best Director	La La Land	Nominated	
2016	Best Original Screenplay	La La Land	Nominated	

=== San Francisco Film Critics Circle ===
Year	Category	Nominated work	Result	Ref.
2014	Best Original Screenplay	Whiplash	Nominated	
2016	Best Director	La La Land	Nominated	
2016	Best Original Screenplay	La La Land	Nominated	

=== Satellite Awards ===
Year	Category	Nominated work	Result	Ref.
2015	Best Director	Whiplash	Nominated	
2017	Best Director	La La Land	Nominated	
2017	Best Original Screenplay	La La Land	Nominated	

=== Saturn Award ===
Year	Category	Nominated work	Result	Ref.
2015	Best Writing	Whiplash	Nominated	
2015	Best Independent Film	Whiplash	Won	
2017	Best Independent Film	La La Land	Won	

=== St. Louis Film Critics Association ===
Year	Category	Nominated work	Result	Ref.
2014	Best Original Screenplay	Whiplash	Nominated	
2016	Best Director	La La Land	Won	
2016	Best Original Screenplay	La La Land	Nominated	

=== Sundance Film Festival ===
Year	Category	Nominated work	Result	Ref.
2013	Short Film Jury Award: U.S. Fiction	Whiplash (Short)	Won	
2013	Short Film Grand Jury Prize	Whiplash (Short)	Nominated	
2014	Audience Award (Dramatic)	Whiplash	Won	
2014	Grand Jury Prize (Dramatic)	Whiplash	Won	

=== Tallinn Black Nights Film Festival ===
Year	Category	Nominated work	Result	Ref.
2014	Best North American Independent Film	Whiplash	Nominated	

=== Torino Film Festival ===
Year	Category	Nominated work	Result	Ref.
2009	Feature Film (Special Jury Prize)	Guy and Madeline on a Park Bench	Won	
2009	Best Feature Film (Prize of the City of Torino)	Guy and Madeline on a Park Bench	Nominated	

=== Toronto Film Critics Association ===
Year	Category	Nominated work	Result	Ref.
2016	Best Director	La La Land	Nominated	

=== Toronto International Film Festival ===
Year	Category	Nominated work	Result	Ref.
2016	People's Choice Award	La La Land	Won	

=== Valladolid International Film Festival ===
Year	Category	Nominated work	Result	Ref.
2014	Golden Spike (Best Film)	Whiplash	Nominated	
2014	Pilar Miró Award (Best New Director)	Whiplash	Won	

=== Vancouver Film Critics Circle ===
Year	Category	Nominated work	Result	Ref.
2016	Best Director	La La Land	Nominated	

=== Venice Film Festival ===
Year	Category	Nominated work	Result	Ref.
2016	Golden Lion	La La Land	Nominated	
2018	Golden Lion	First Man	Nominated	

=== Washington D.C. Area Film Critics Association ===
Year	Category	Nominated work	Result	Ref.
2014	Best Director	Whiplash	Nominated	
2014	Best Original Screenplay	Whiplash	Nominated	
2016	Best Director	La La Land	Won	
2016	Best Original Screenplay	La La Land	Won	

=== Writers Guild of America Award ===
Year	Category	Nominated work	Result	Ref.
2014	Best Original Screenplay	Whiplash	Nominated	
2016	Best Original Screenplay	La La Land	Nominated	
