= Chazelle =

Chazelle is a surname. Notable people with the surname include:

- Bernard Chazelle (born 1955), French computer scientist
- Celia Chazelle (born 1954), Canadian historian and author
- Damien Chazelle (born 1985), American screenwriter and film director
