= History Compass =

- Discipline: History
- Language: English
- Edited by: Bhavani Raman

Publication details
- History: 2003–present
- Publisher: Wiley-Blackwell
- Frequency: Bimonthly
- Impact factor: 0.9 (2025)

Standard abbreviations
- ISO 4: Hist. Compass

Indexing
- ISSN: 1478-0542 (print); 1478-0542 (web)
- LCCN: 2007252533
- OCLC no.: 949804183

Links
- Journal homepage; Online access; Online archive

History Compass is a bimonthly peer-reviewed academic journal published by Wiley-Blackwell. Originally launched in association with the Institute of Historical Research (London), its aim is to "solve the problem of keeping up with new developments in history by providing historians with regularly updated overviews of the important trends, debates, resources and publications in the field...combining a current awareness service with a survey journal for lecturers, researchers, and advanced students of history."

The journal was established in 2003 and within three years had become a leading high-profile peer-reviewed electronic journal for history, featuring more than 100 new articles per year and its site routinely receiving 300,000 hits a month.

The editor-in-chief is Bhavani Raman (University of Toronto.

The founding editor-in-chief was the late Mark Kishlansky (Harvard University; (2003–2008), followed by Felice Lifshitz (University of Alberta; 2008–2013), and Laura Smoller (University of Rochester; 2013–2018). The journal has benefited from a close association with the American Historical Association, which for a time offered its members a free six-month trial. The journal also offered a now-defunct graduate essay prize, the results of which were to be announced at the AHA's annual meeting. According to the Journal Citation Reports, the journal has a 2025 impact factor of 0.9.
