= David Dobkin =

David Dobkin may refer to:

- David P. Dobkin (born 1948), computer scientist and the dean of the faculty at Princeton University
- David Dobkin (director) (born ca. 1969), film director, known for Clay Pigeons, Shanghai Knights, and Wedding Crashers
