= Alliance of Women Film Journalists Award for Best Director =

The Alliance of Women Film Journalists Award for Best Picture is an annual award given by the Alliance of Women Film Journalists. The award is often referred to as an EDA as a tribute to AWFJ founder Jennifer Merin's mother, actress Eda Reiss Merin. EDA is also an acronym for Excellent Dynamic Activism.

== Winners ==
- "†" indicates Academy Award-winning direction.
- "‡" indicates Academy Award-nominated direction.

=== 2000s ===
Year	Director(s)	Film
2007	Joel & Ethan Coen†	No Country for Old Men
2007	Sean Penn	Into the Wild
2007	Sarah Polley	Away from Her
2007	Julian Schnabel ‡	The Diving Bell and the Butterfly
2008	Danny Boyle †	Slumdog Millionaire
2008	Mike Leigh	Happy-Go-Lucky
2008	Gus Van Sant ‡	Milk
2009	Kathryn Bigelow †	The Hurt Locker
2009	Jason Reitman ‡	Up in the Air
2009	Quentin Tarantino ‡	Inglourious Basterds

=== 2010s ===
Year	Director(s)	Film
2010	David Fincher ‡	The Social Network
2010	Darren Aronofsky ‡	Black Swan
2010	Lisa Cholodenko	The Kids Are All Right
2010	Debra Granik	Winter's Bone
2010	Tom Hooper †	The King's Speech
2010	Christopher Nolan	Inception
2011	Michel Hazanavicius †	The Artist
2011	Woody Allen ‡	Midnight in Paris
2011	Terrence Malick ‡	The Tree of Life
2011	Alexander Payne ‡	The Descendants
2011	Martin Scorsese ‡	Hugo
2012	Kathryn Bigelow	Zero Dark Thirty
2012	Ben Affleck	Argo
2012	Steven Spielberg ‡	Lincoln
2013	Steve McQueen ‡	12 Years a Slave
2013	Joel & Ethan Coen	Inside Llewyn Davis
2013	Alfonso Cuarón †	Gravity
2013	Spike Jonze	Her
2013	Alexander Payne ‡	Nebraska
2013	David O. Russell ‡	American Hustle
2014	Richard Linklater ‡	Boyhood
2014	Wes Anderson ‡	The Grand Budapest Hotel
2014	Ava DuVernay	Selma
2014	Alejandro G. Iñárritu †	Birdman or (The Unexpected Virtue of Ignorance)
2014	Jim Jarmusch	Only Lovers Left Alive
2015	Tom McCarthy ‡	Spotlight
2015	Lenny Abrahamson ‡	Room
2015	Todd Haynes	Carol
2015	Alejandro G. Iñárritu †	The Revenant
2015	George Miller ‡	Mad Max: Fury Road
2015	Ridley Scott	The Martian
2016	Barry Jenkins ‡	Moonlight
2016	Damien Chazelle †	La La Land
2016	Kenneth Lonergan ‡	Manchester by the Sea
2016	David Mackenzie	Hell or High Water
2016	Denis Villeneuve ‡	Arrival
2017	Guillermo del Toro †	The Shape of Water
2017	Greta Gerwig ‡	Lady Bird
2017	Martin McDonagh	Three Billboards Outside Ebbing, Missouri
2017	Christopher Nolan ‡	Dunkirk
2017	Jordan Peele ‡	Get Out
2018	Alfonso Cuarón	Roma
2018	Debra Granik	Leave No Trace
2018	Yorgos Lanthimos	The Favourite
2018	Spike Lee	BlacKkKlansman
2018	Adam McKay	Vice
