= Celia Chazelle =

Canadian historian

- Born: Celia Martin; March 21, 1954 (age 72)
- Spouse: Bernard Chazelle
- Children: Damien Chazelle; Anna Chazelle
- Awards: Fellow of the Medieval Academy of America; 2019

Academic background
- Education: University of Toronto (BA); Yale University (PhD)
- Thesis: The Cross, the Image, and the Passion in Carolingian Thought and Art (1985)

Academic work
- Discipline: Historian
- Sub-discipline: Medieval studies
- Institutions: The College of New Jersey

Celia Martin Chazelle (born April 7, 1954) is a Canadian historian and author. She is a professor of history at The College of New Jersey.

== Early life and education ==
Celia Martin was born in California on April 7, 1954, to an English father, John Martin, who held small roles in films and who taught English Literature at the University of Calgary. Her mother Constance was born in Calgary. Her grandfather was a manager of Paramount Pictures in London during the era of silent films. Chazelle has two younger siblings.

Chazelle completed a Bachelor of Arts in history at the University of Toronto in 1977. She earned a Master of Arts in medieval studies in 1978 at Yale University, where she also completed a Doctor of Philosophy in 1985. Her doctoral thesis was The Cross, the Image, and the Passion in Carolingian Thought and Art.

== Career ==
In 2008, Chazelle began teaching courses in social justice and prison history at the Albert C. Wagner Youth Correctional Facility, through the Petey Greene Prisoner Assistance Program. She later taught joint courses with The College of New Jersey (TCNJ). She is a professor of history at TCNJ and was the department chair there from 2008 to 2014. In 2019, Brill Academic Publishing published her monograph, The Codex Amiatinus and Its Sister Bibles: Scripture, Liturgy, and Art in the Milieu of the Venerable Bede. She was named a Fellow of the Medieval Academy of America in 2019.

== Personal life ==
Chazelle is married to French computer scientist Bernard Chazelle. They have two children, Damien and Anna.

== Selected works ==
=== Books ===
- Chazelle, Celia (2001). The Crucified God in the Carolingian Era: Theology and Art of Christ's Passion. Cambridge University Press. ISBN 9780521801034.
- Chazelle, Celia; Doubleday, Simon; Lifshitz, Felice; Remensnyder, Amy G. (2012). Why the Middle Ages Matter: Medieval Light on Modern Injustice. Routledge. ISBN 9781136636486.
- Chazelle, Celia (2019). The Codex Amiatinus and Its Sister Bibles: Scripture, Liturgy, and Art in the Milieu of the Venerable Bede. Brill Academic Pub. ISBN 9789004390133.
