= Felice Lifshitz =

American academic historian

- Born: September 21, 1959 (age 67)
- Occupations: Historian and academic

Academic background
- Education: Barnard College
- Alma mater: Columbia University

Academic work
- Discipline: History
- Sub-discipline: Women's history; Gender history; Middle Ages
- Institutions: Columbia University; Trinity College (Connecticut); Florida International University; University of Alberta
- Notable works: History Compass; The Historian

Felice Lifshitz (born September 21, 1959) is an American academic historian, who specialises in medieval European women's and gender history. She is Professor of Women's and Gender Studies at the University of Alberta.

Lifshitz is a former editor-in-chief of the peer-reviewed journal History Compass, and serves on the editorial board for The Historian.

== Education ==
Lifshitz graduated from Barnard College (1981) and a Masters (1983) and Ph.D. (1988) from Columbia University.

== Academic career ==
While studying for her doctorate at Columbia University, Lifshitz held posts as a teaching assistant, instructor and preceptor within the university's Department of History. Upon achieving her doctorate she became a visiting assistant professor at Trinity College in Connecticut. In 1989 she became an assistant professor at Florida International University, being promoted to associate professor in 1995 and professor in 2005. She moved to the University of Alberta in 2011.

== Selected works ==
- Chazelle, Celia; Doubleday, Simon; Lifshitz, Felice; Remensnyder, Amy G. (2012). Why the Middle Ages Matter: Medieval Light on Modern Injustice. Routledge. ISBN 9781136636486.
