= Ayellet Tal =

Israeli researcher in computational geometry and computer graphics

- איילת טל
- Born: 1962 (age 63–64)
- Education: Tel Aviv University, Princeton University
- Known for: Computational geometry, computer graphics, geometric modeling, geometry processing
- Awards: Alfred and Marion Bar Chair in Engineering
- Scientific career
- Fields: Computational Geometry, Computer Graphics
- Workplaces: Technion – Israel Institute of Technology
- Doctoral advisor: David P. Dobkin

Ayellet Tal (Hebrew: איילת טל; born 1962) is an Israeli researcher in computational geometry and computer graphics, who holds the Alfred and Marion Bar Chair in Engineering at the Technion.

== Research ==
Tal's research interests include computational geometry, computer graphics, geometric modeling, and geometry processing. She has also studied the applications of computer vision to archaeology.

== Education and career ==
Tal has a bachelor's degree in mathematics and computer science from Tel Aviv University and a Ph.D. in 1995 in computer science from Princeton University. Her dissertation, Animation and Visualization of Geometric Algorithms, was supervised by David P. Dobkin.

She is a professor of electrical engineering at the Technion – Israel Institute of Technology, and holds the Alfred and Marion Bar Chair in Engineering at the Technion. At the Technion, she is also the advisor for the advancement of women in science and engineering at the university.

== Recognition ==
Tal was a keynote speaker at Computer Graphics International 2015.
