= Deborah Silver =

American information visualization researcher

Deborah E. Silver is an American computer scientist specializing in information visualization, scientific visualization, and the use of skeletons in identifying the features of shapes. She is a professor in the Department of Electrical and Computer Engineering at Rutgers University, where she is executive director of the Professional Science Master's Program and former associate dean for continuing and professional education in the School of Engineering.

== Education ==
Silver earned a bachelor's degree in computer science from Columbia University in 1984, and a master's degree and Ph.D. from Princeton University in 1986 and 1988 respectively. Her dissertation, Geometry, Graphics, and Numerical Analysis, was supervised by David P. Dobkin.

== Service ==
She has held many service roles involving visualization in the IEEE, and serves on the 2021–2023 Board of Governors of the IEEE Computer Society. She was vice president of the National Professional Science Master's Association from 2013 to 2017.
