= Chazelle polyhedron =

Cube with notched surfaces

The Chazelle polyhedron

Chazelle polyhedron is a non-convex polyhedron constructed by removing pieces of wedges from both top and bottom of a cube's sides, leaving the notches. Its saddle surface can be considered as the set of line segments that lie forming the hyperbolic paraboloid with an equation $z = xy$. This polyhedron is named after Bernard Chazelle.

Originally, the Chazelle polyhedron was intended to prove the quadratic lower bound of complexity on the decomposition of convex polyhedra in three dimensions. The later applications are used regarding the problem related to the construction of lower bounds as in the binary space partition, bounding volume hierarchy for collision detection, decomposability of fat-polyhedra, and optimal triangulation in mesh generation with its element's size.
