= Diane Souvaine =

Computer scientist

Diane L. Souvaine
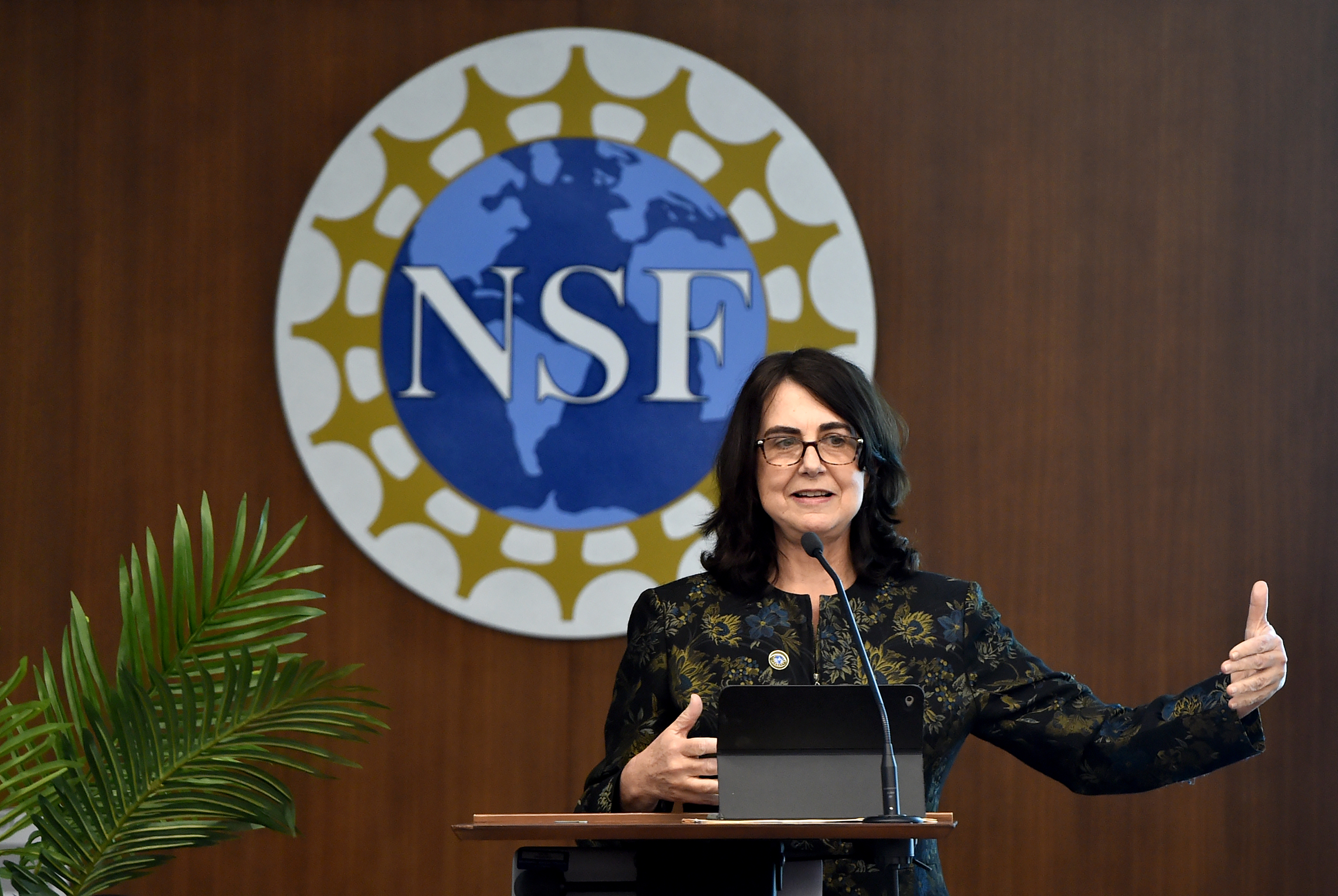
- Diane Souvaine at the NSF 70th Anniversary Symposium, 2020
- Board member of: National Science Board

Academic background
- Education: Radcliffe College; Dartmouth College
- Alma mater: Princeton University
- Doctoral advisor: David P. Dobkin

Academic work
- Discipline: Computational geometry
- Institutions: Tufts University; Rutgers University

Diane L. Souvaine is a professor of computer science and an adjunct professor of mathematics at Tufts University.

== Contributions ==
Souvaine's research is in computational geometry and its applications, including robust non-parametric statistics and molecular modeling. She has also encouraged women and minorities to study and pursue careers in mathematics and the sciences and advocated gender neutrality in science teaching.

== Education and career ==
After undergraduate and masters studies at Radcliffe College of Harvard University and at Dartmouth College, Souvaine earned her Ph.D. in 1986 from Princeton University under the supervision of David P. Dobkin. She held a faculty position at Rutgers University from 1986 to 1998, and from 1992 to 1994 served first as acting associate director and then as acting director of DIMACS. From 1994 to 1995 she took a visiting position in mathematics at the Institute for Advanced Study in Princeton, New Jersey, and in 1998 she took a permanent position at Tufts University.

== Leadership and administration ==
At Tufts, Souvaine was department chair from 2002 to 2005 and (after a sabbatical at Harvard and the Massachusetts Institute of Technology) was reappointed as chair in 2006. She was Vice Provost for Research from 2012 to 2016.

She joined the National Science Board, a 24-member body that governs the National Science Foundation and advises the United States government about science policy, in 2008, and was the chair of the board for 2018–2020. She also served for several years on the board of advisors for the Computer Science Department at the University of Vermont as well as for the Computer Science Department at Lehigh University.

== Recognition ==
In 2008 Souvaine won Tufts' Lillian and Joseph Leibner Award for Excellence in Teaching and Advising of Students. In 2011, she was listed as a fellow of the Association for Computing Machinery for her research in computational geometry and her service to the computing community. She became a fellow of the American Association for the Advancement of Science in 2016. The Association for Women in Mathematics has included her in the 2020 class of AWM Fellows for "sustained advocacy, support and mentorship of women and students underrepresented in STEM fields in mathematics and theoretical computer science at multiple scales, from impacting individual mentees and advisees, to creating deep and broad institutional cultural change".
