= Critics' Choice Movie Award for Best Director =

Annual film award

Critics' Choice Award for Best Director
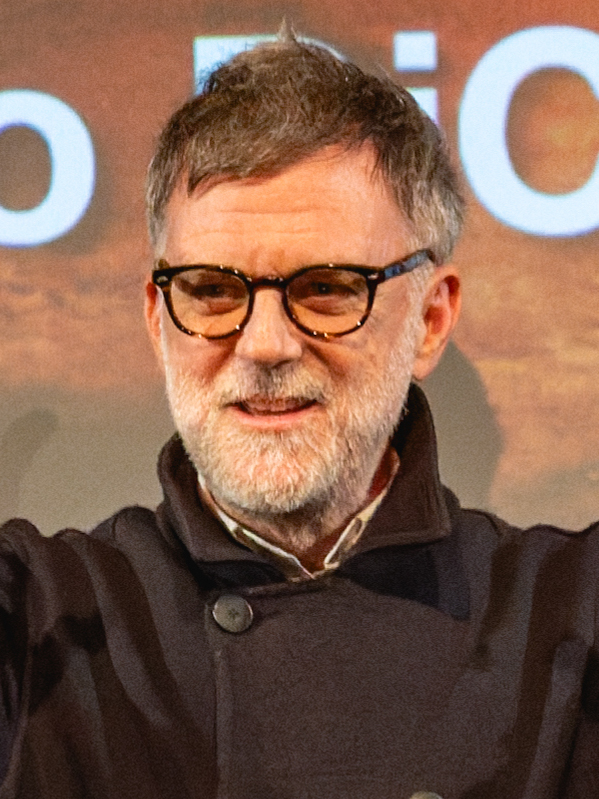
- 2025 recipient: Paul Thomas Anderson
- Awarded for: Best Direction of a Motion Picture
- Location: Los Angeles, California
- Presented by: Critics Choice Association
- First award: Mel Gibson for Braveheart (1995)
- Currently held by: Paul Thomas Anderson for One Battle After Another (2025)
- Website: www.criticschoice.com

The Critics' Choice Award for Best Director is one of the awards given to film directors working in the film industry by the Critics Choice Association at the annual Critics' Choice Movie Awards. It was first given out to Mel Gibson for Braveheart in 1996 as a juried award. Until 2001, only the winner was presented; since then, a set of nominees is announced every year.

Only four directors have received the award more than once with two wins each: Alfonso Cuarón, Sam Mendes, Martin Scorsese, and Steven Spielberg. The latter also holds the record of most nominations in the category with eight. Kathryn Bigelow, Jane Campion, and Chloé Zhao are the only female winners of the award.

== Winners and nominees ==
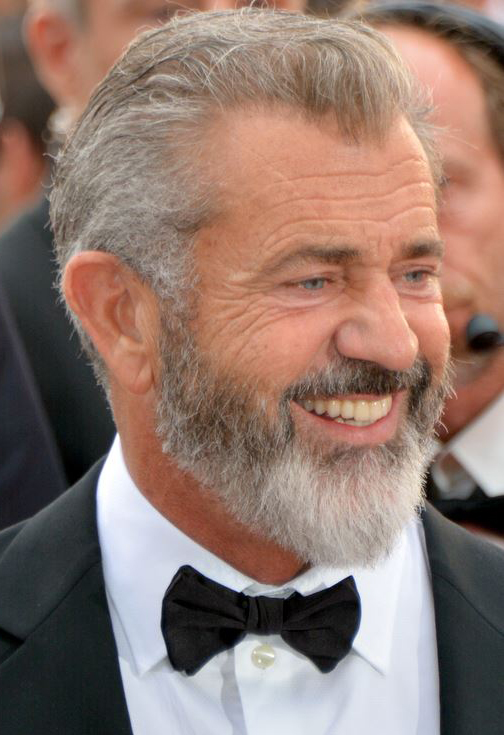
Mel Gibson is the first recipient of this award

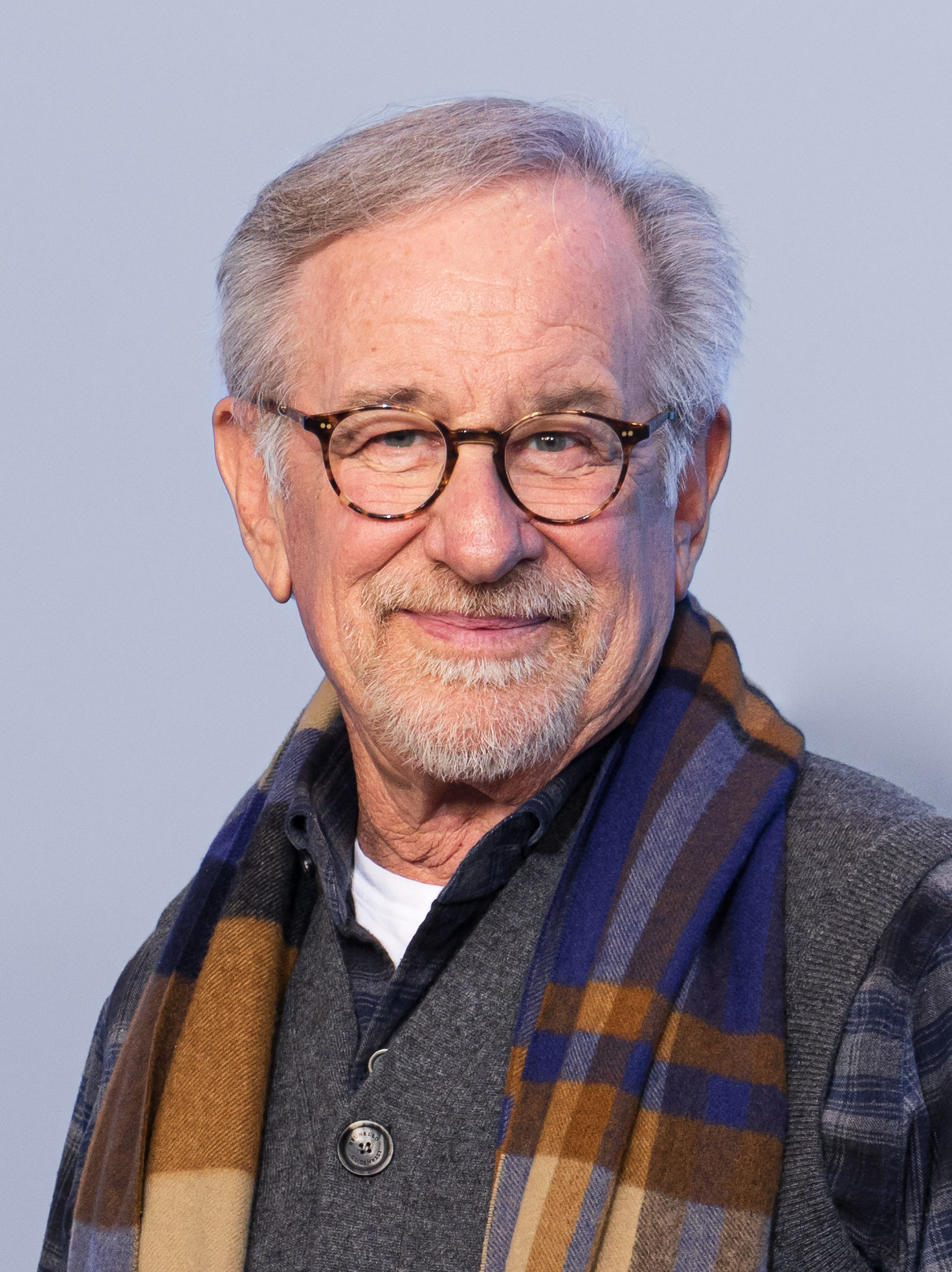
Steven Spielberg won this award twice for his films Saving Private Ryan (1998) and Catch Me if You Can / Minority Report (2002)

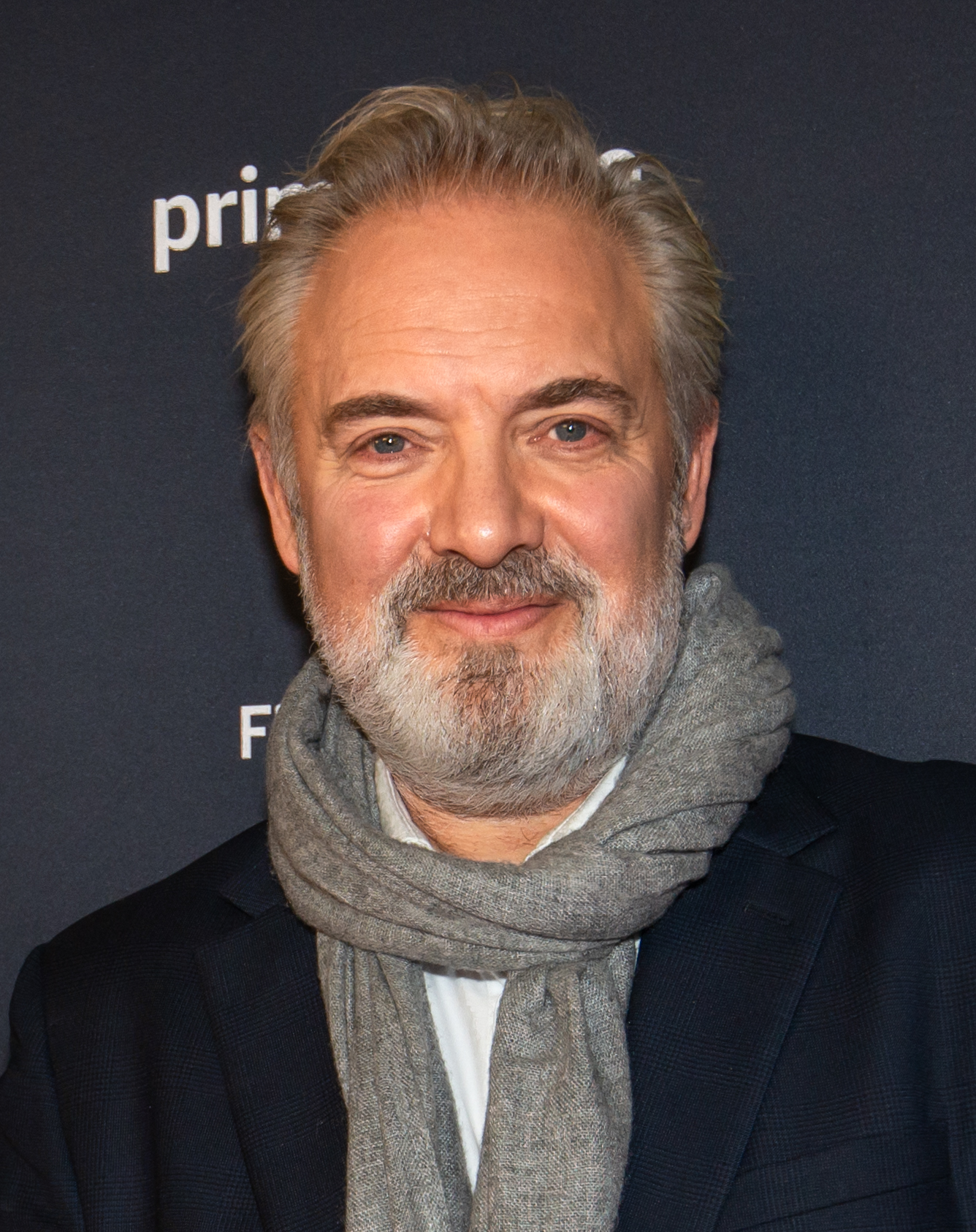
Sam Mendes won twice, for American Beauty (1999) and 1917 (2019)

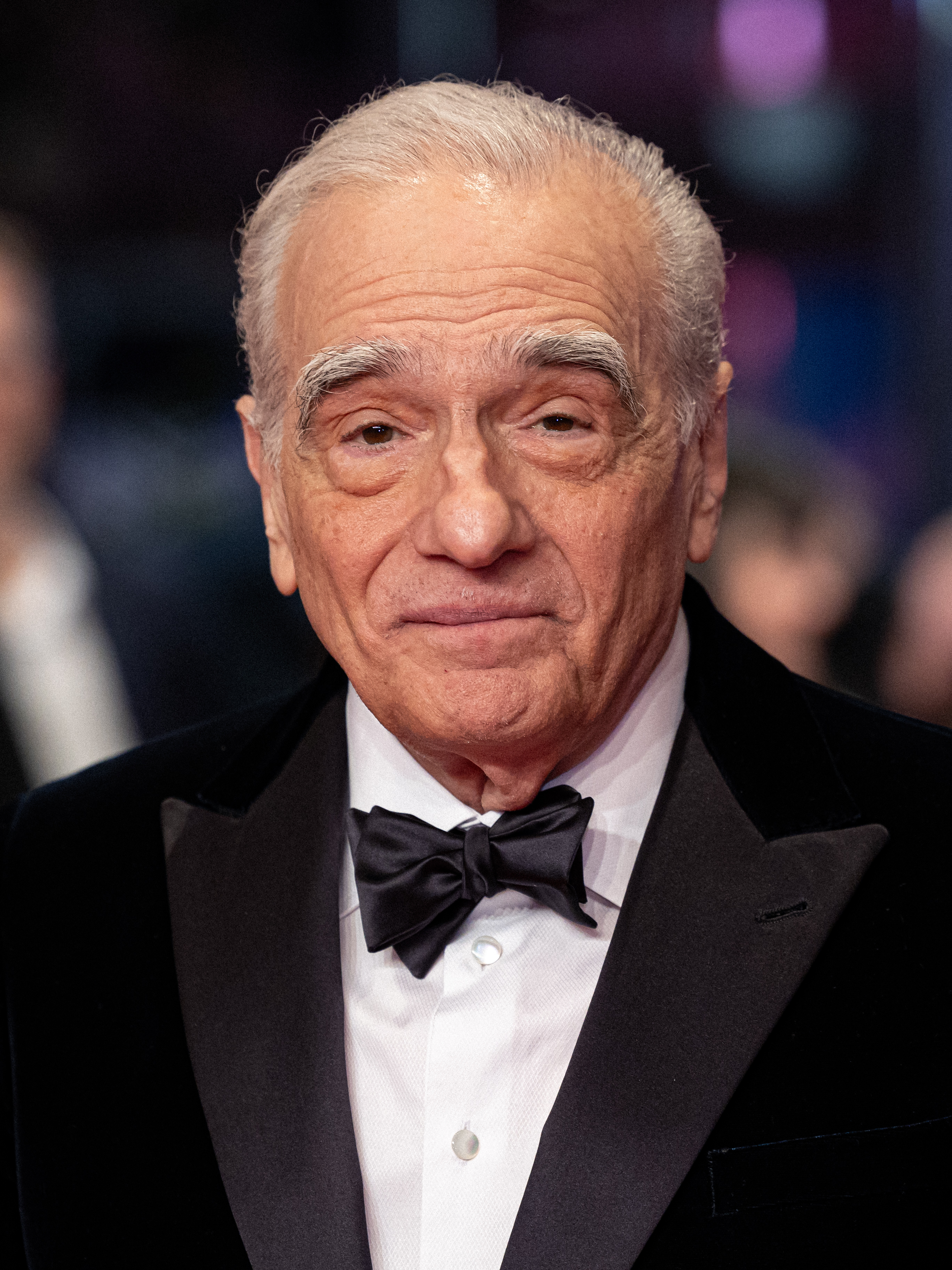
Martin Scorsese won this award twice for The Aviator (2004) and The Departed (2006)

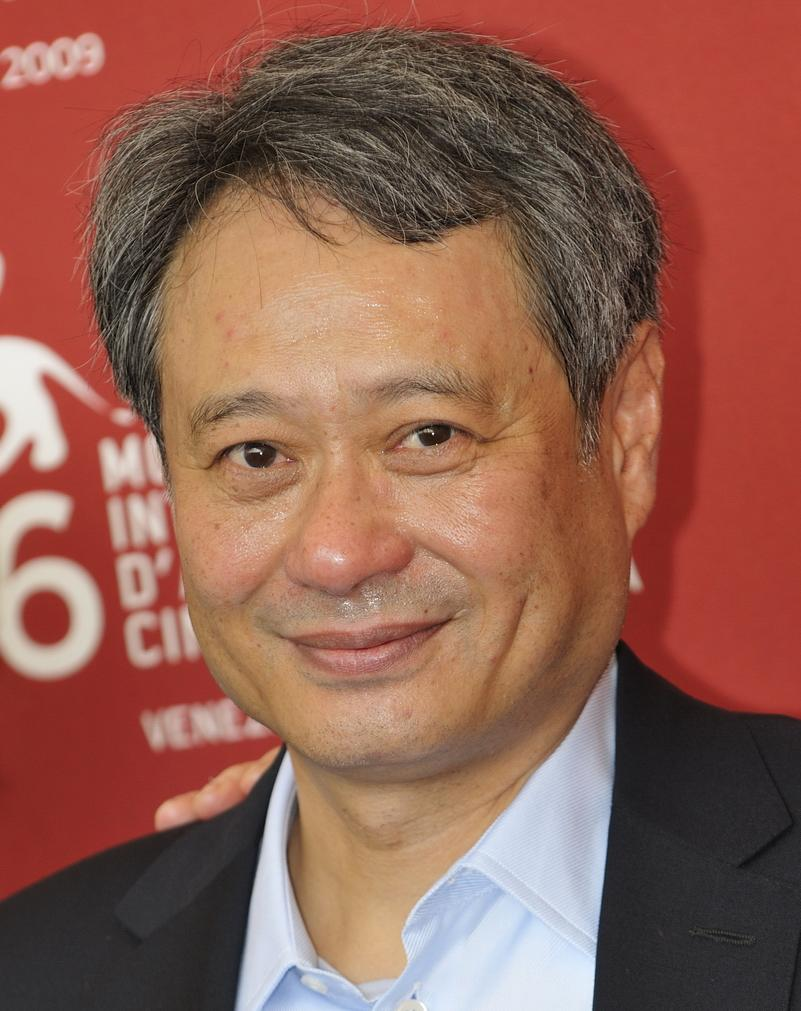
Ang Lee won for Brokeback Mountain (2005)

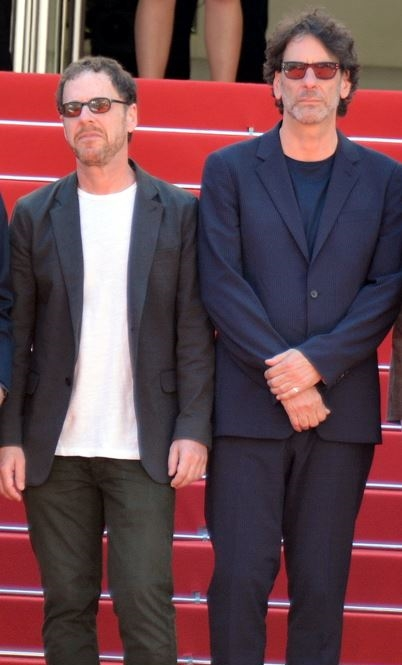
Joel and Ethan Coen won for No Country for Old Men (2007)

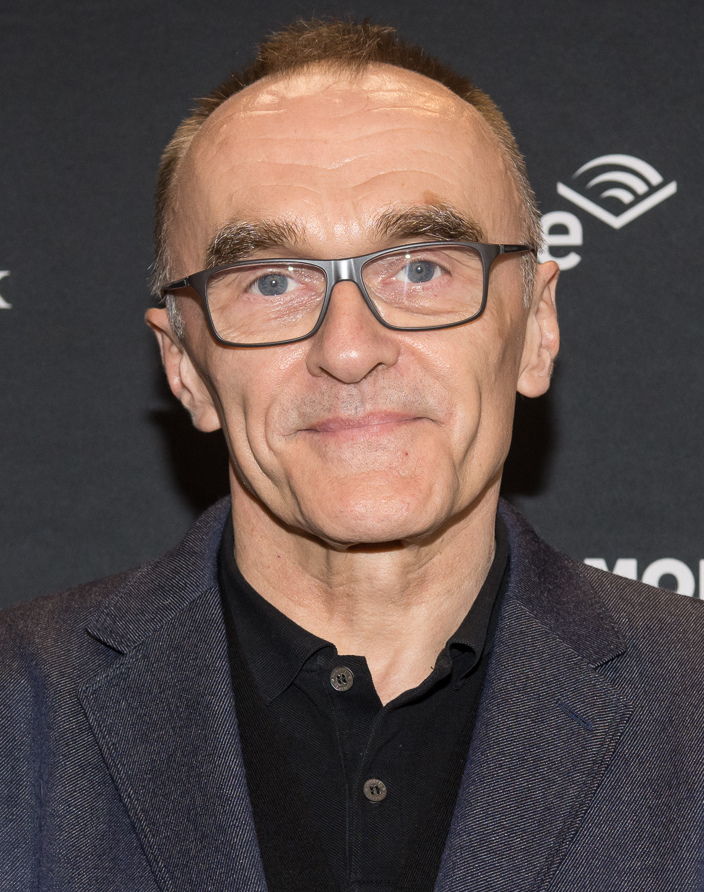
Danny Boyle won for Slumdog Millionaire (2008)

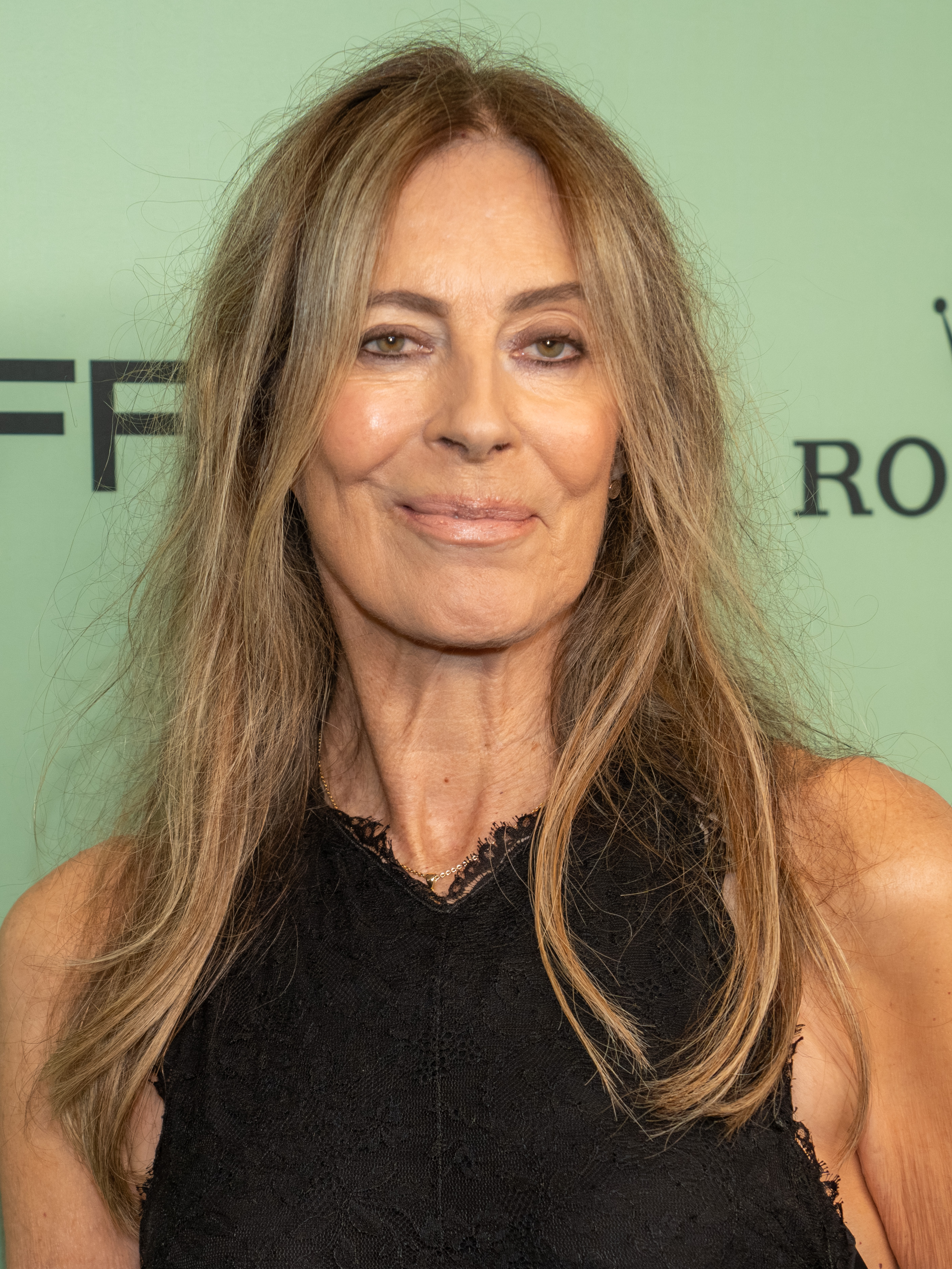
Kathryn Bigelow won for The Hurt Locker, becoming the first female to win this award

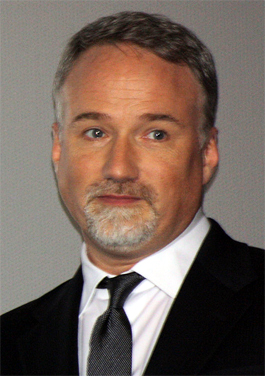
David Fincher won for The Social Network (2010)

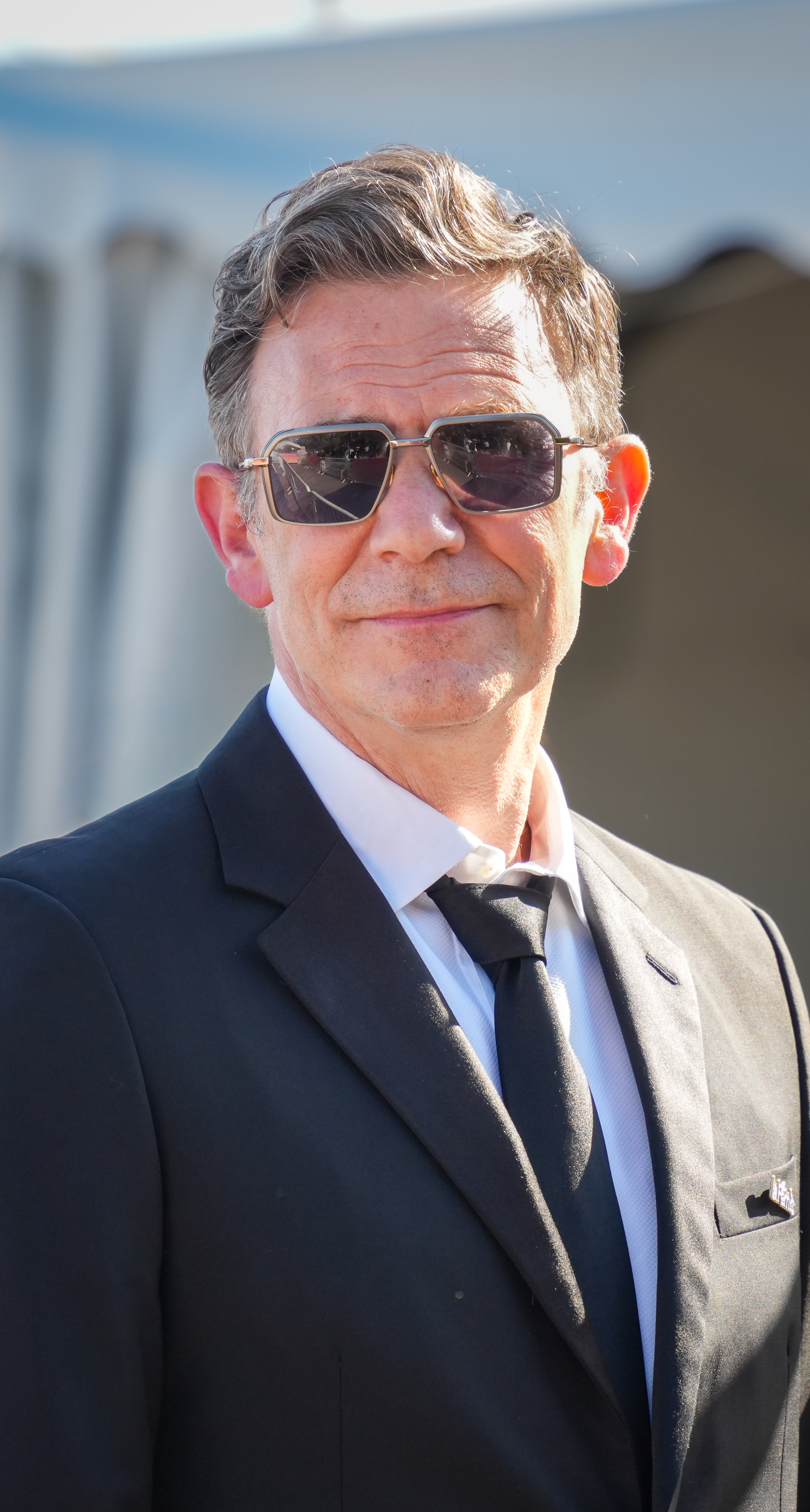
Michel Hazanavicius won for The Artist (2011)

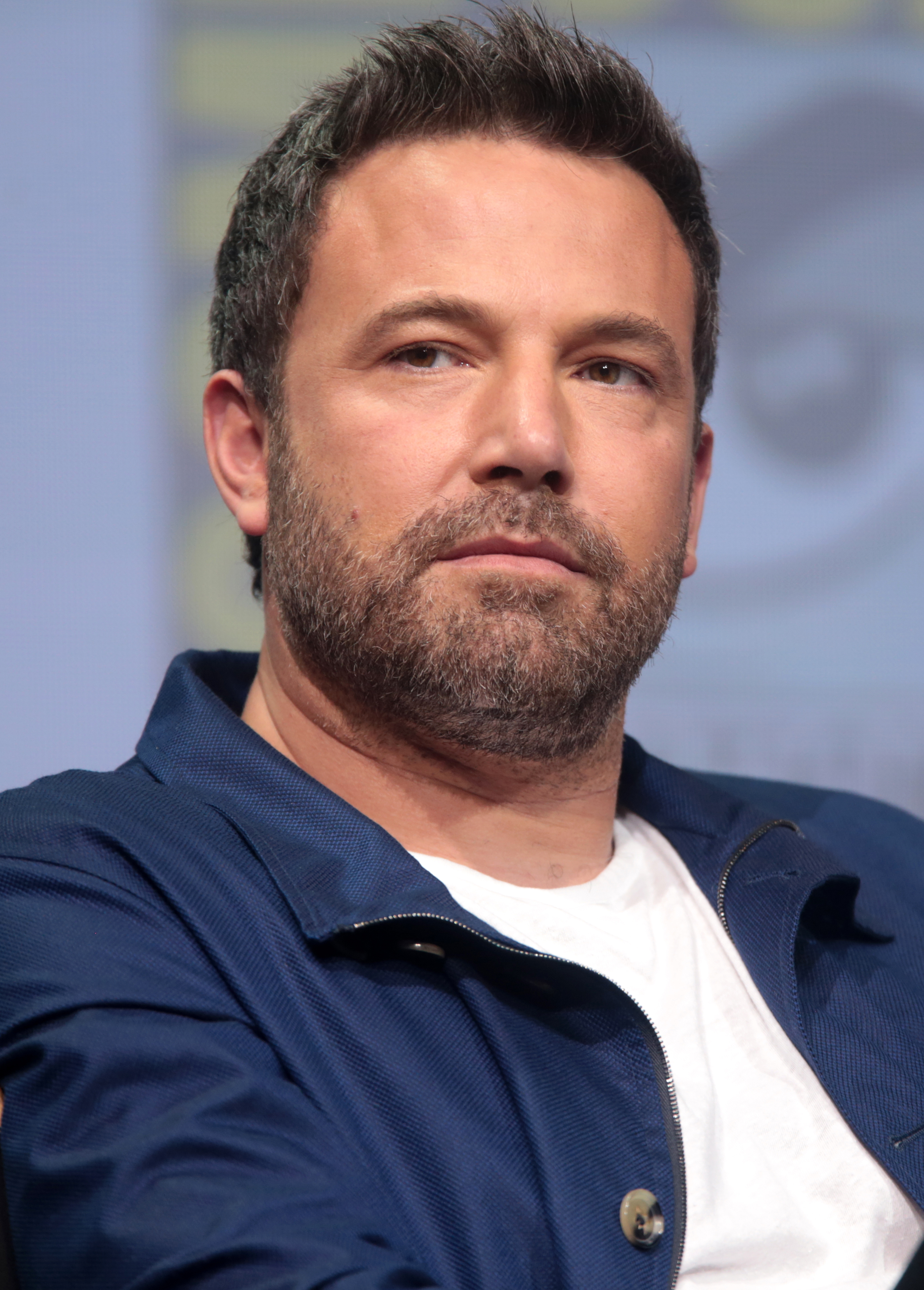
Ben Affleck won for Argo (2012)

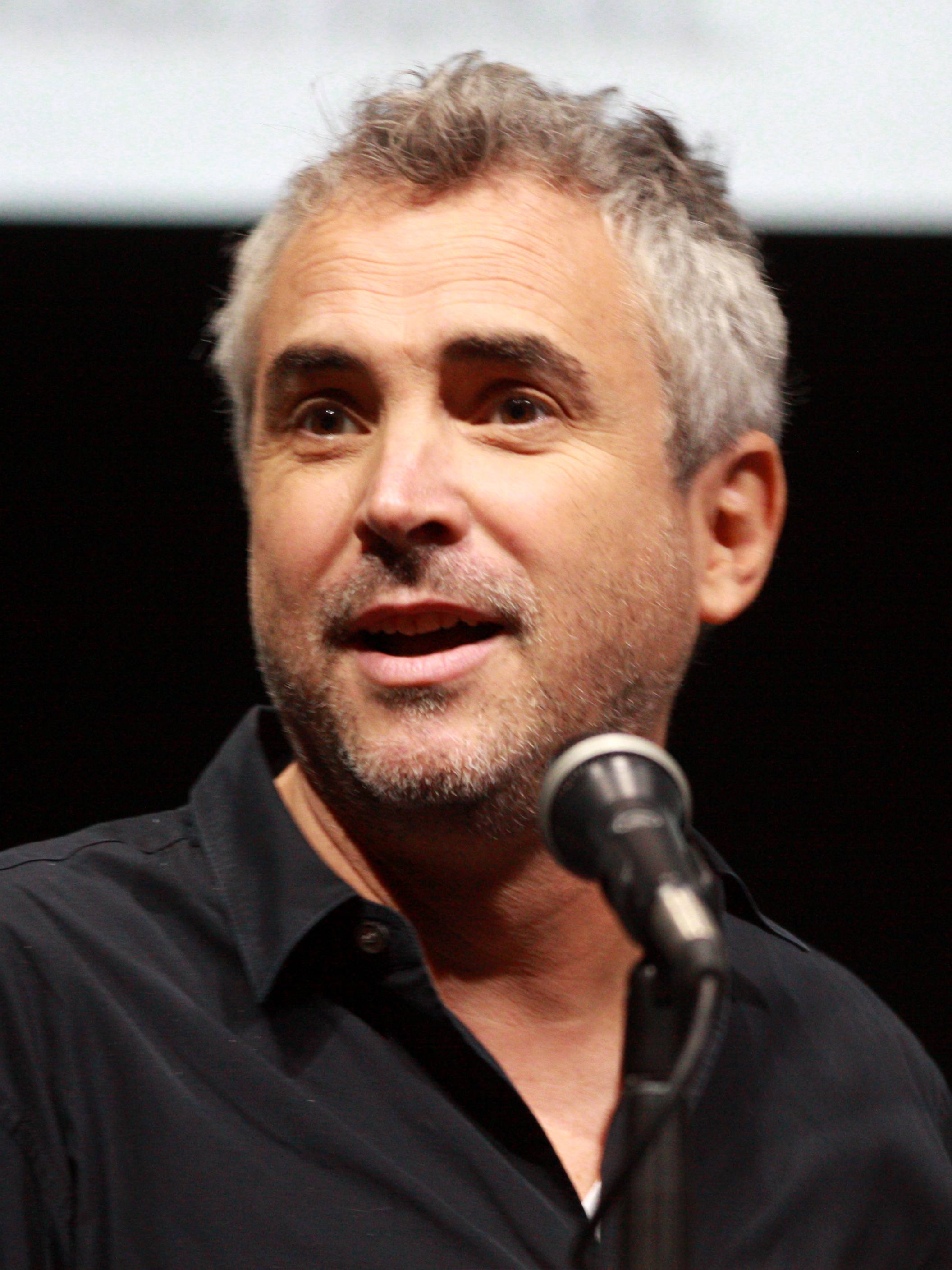
Alfonso Cuarón won for his films Gravity (2013) and Roma (2018)

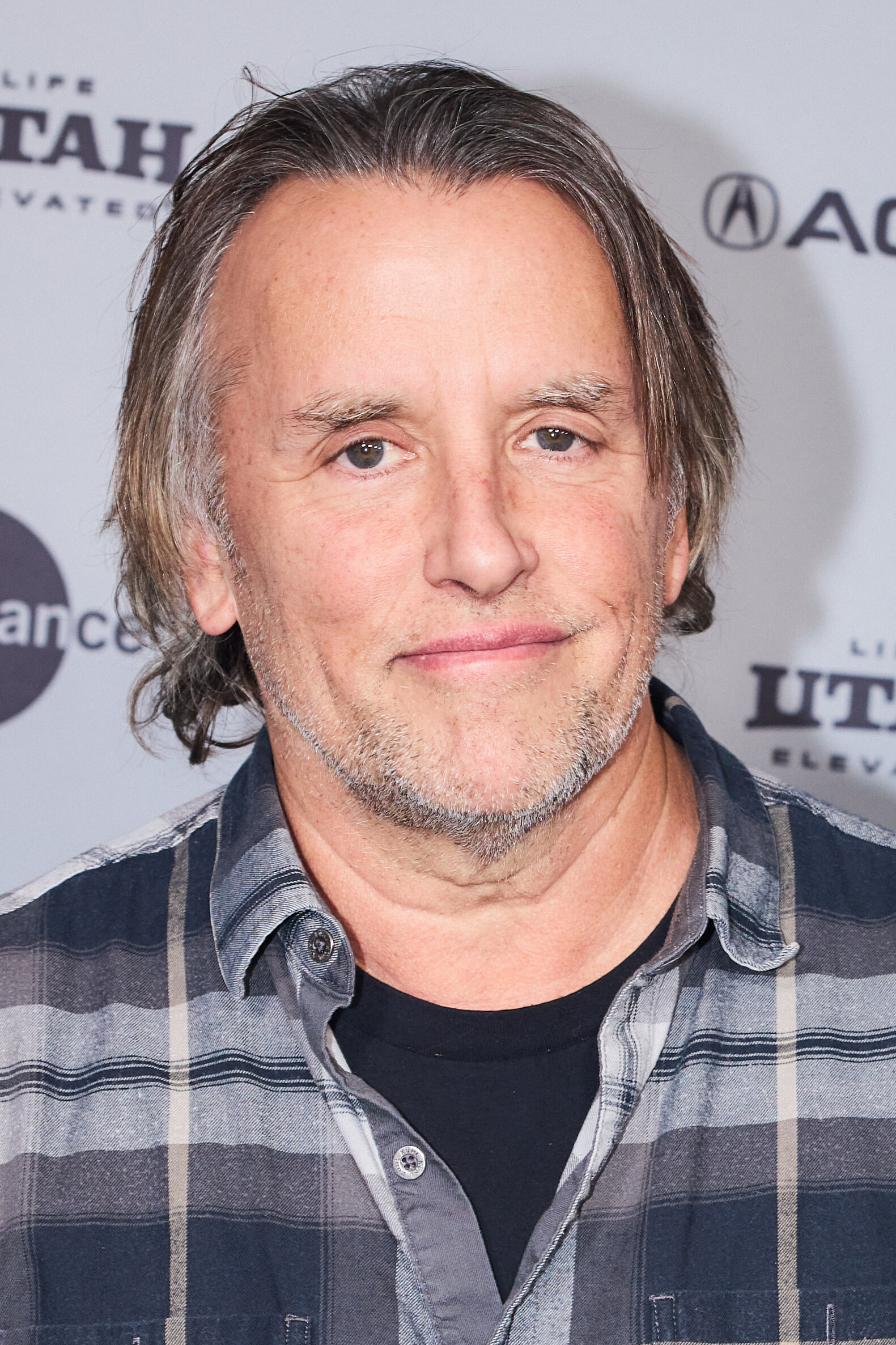
Richard Linklater won for Boyhood (2014)

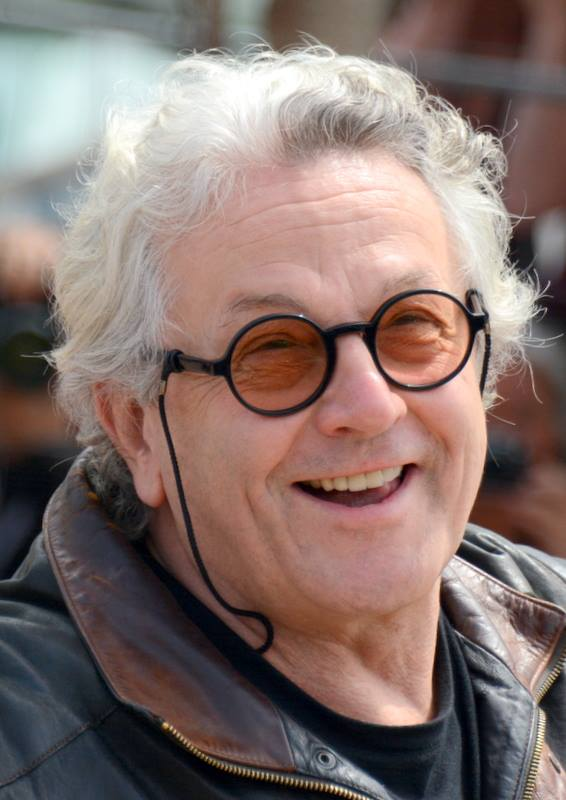
George Miller won for Mad Max: Fury Road (2015)

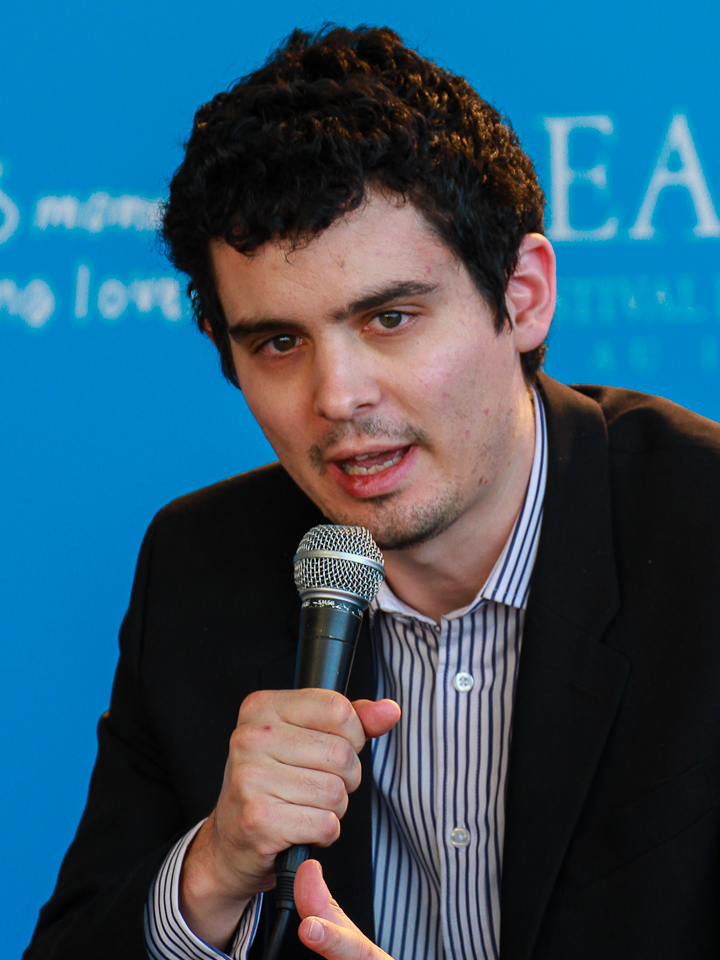
Damien Chazelle won for his film La La Land (2016)

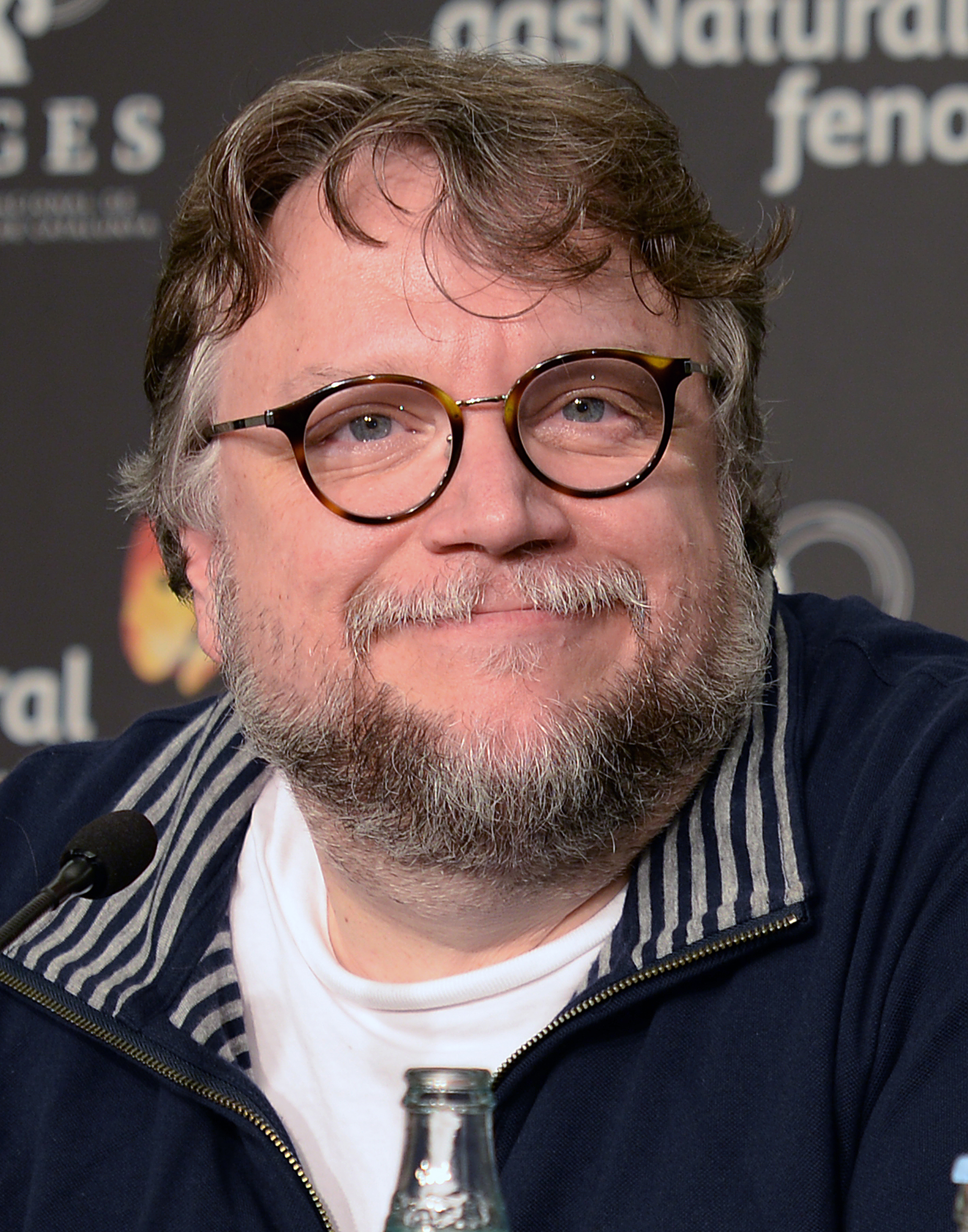
Guillermo del Toro won for his film The Shape of Water (2017)

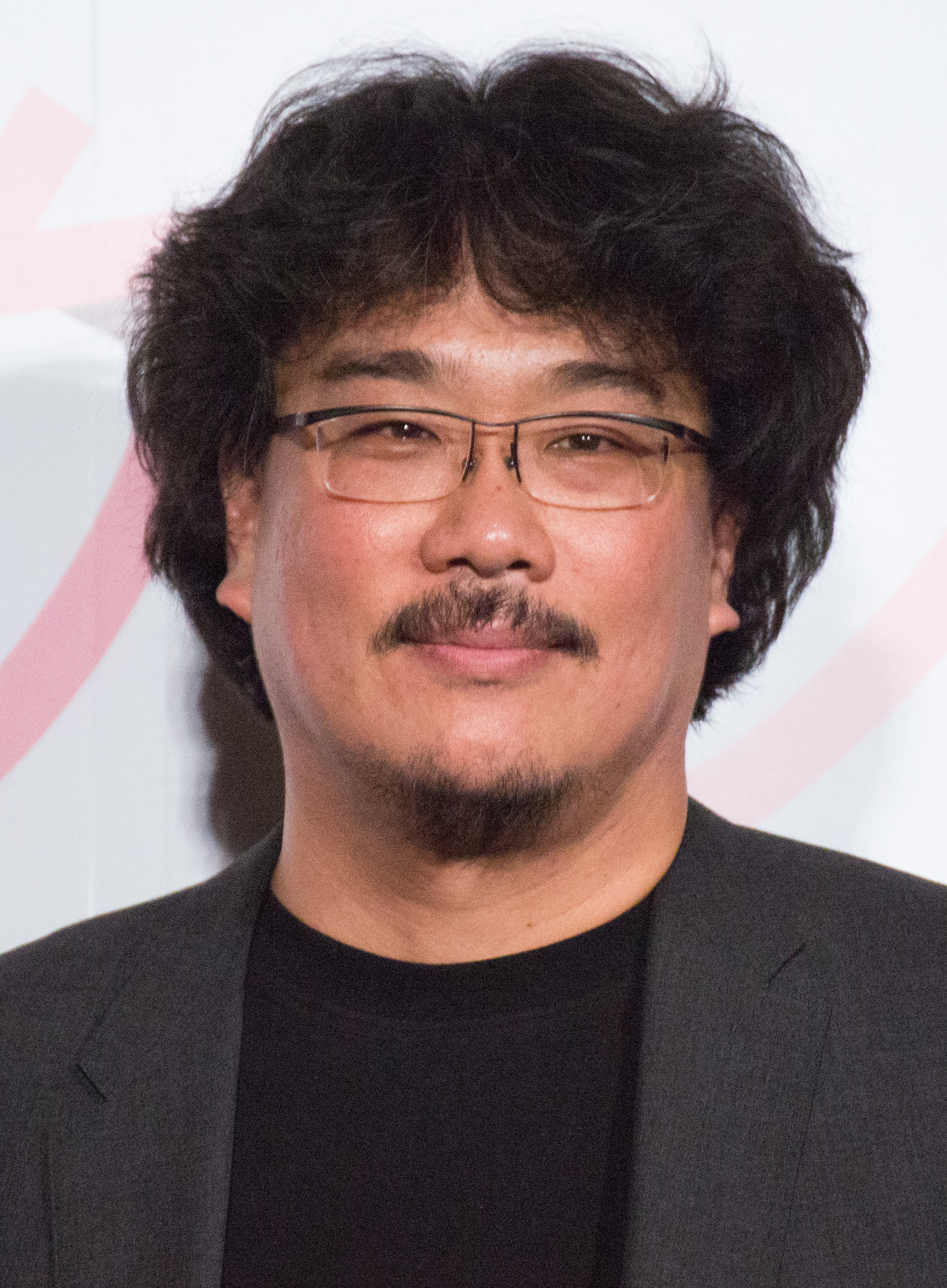
Bong Joon Ho won for his film Parasite (2019)

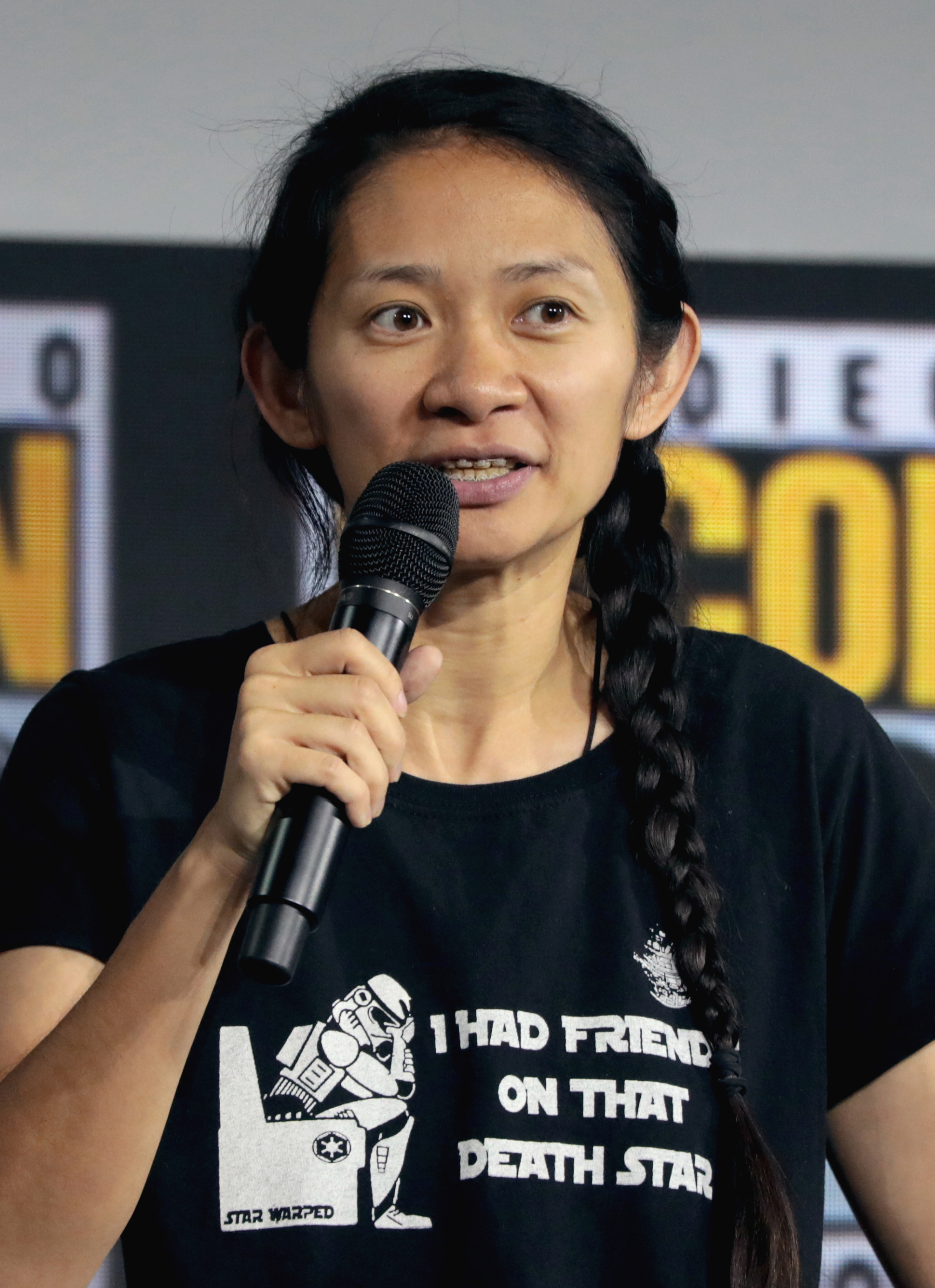
Chloe Zhao won for her film Nomadland (2020)

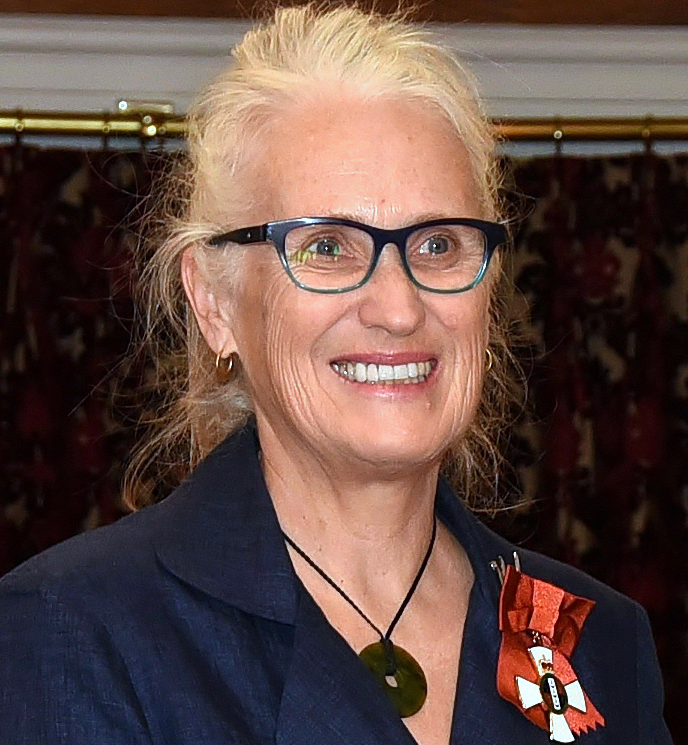
Jane Campion won for The Power of the Dog (2021)

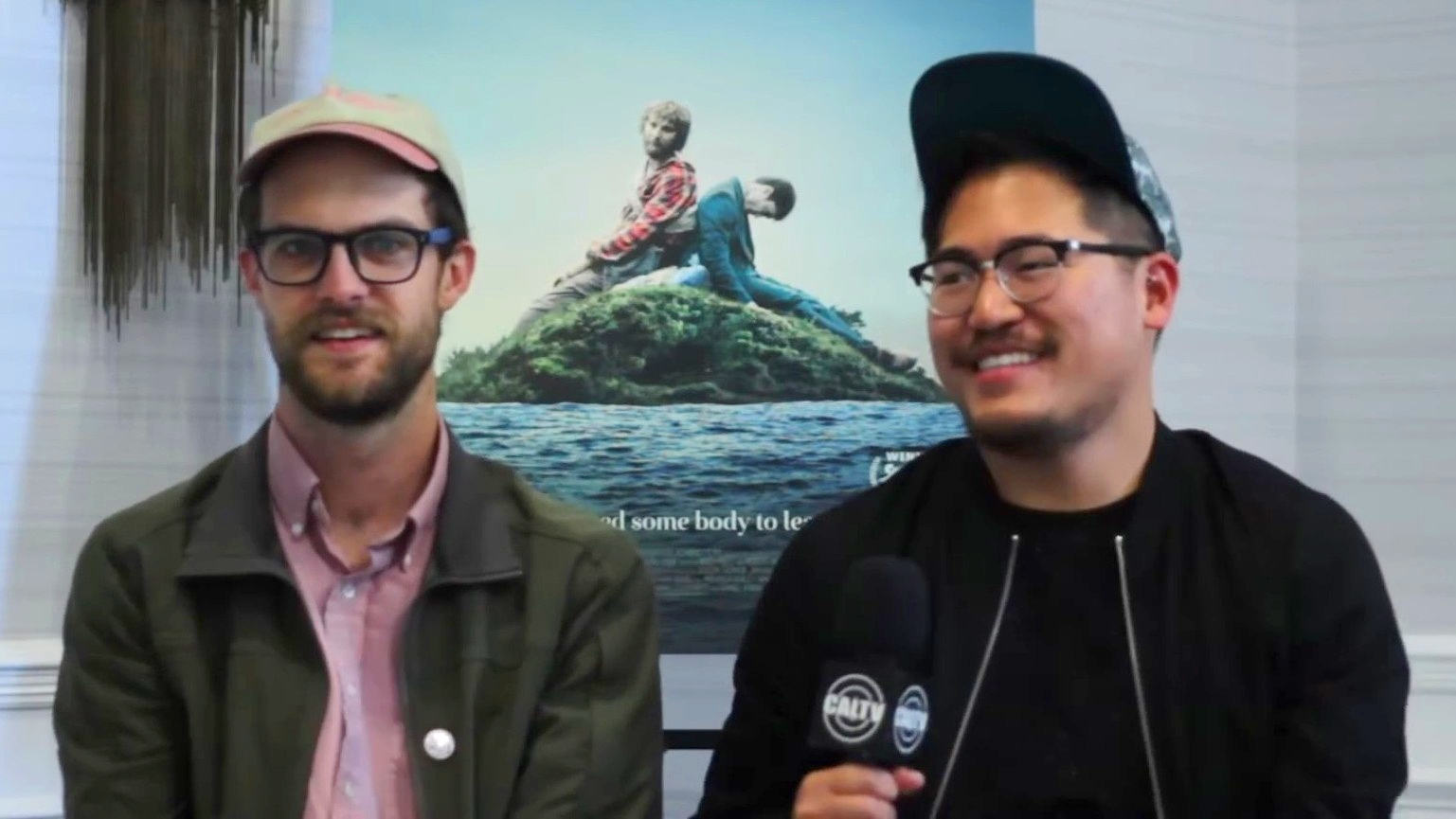
Daniel Scheinert and Daniel Kwan won for their film Everything Everywhere All at Once (2022)

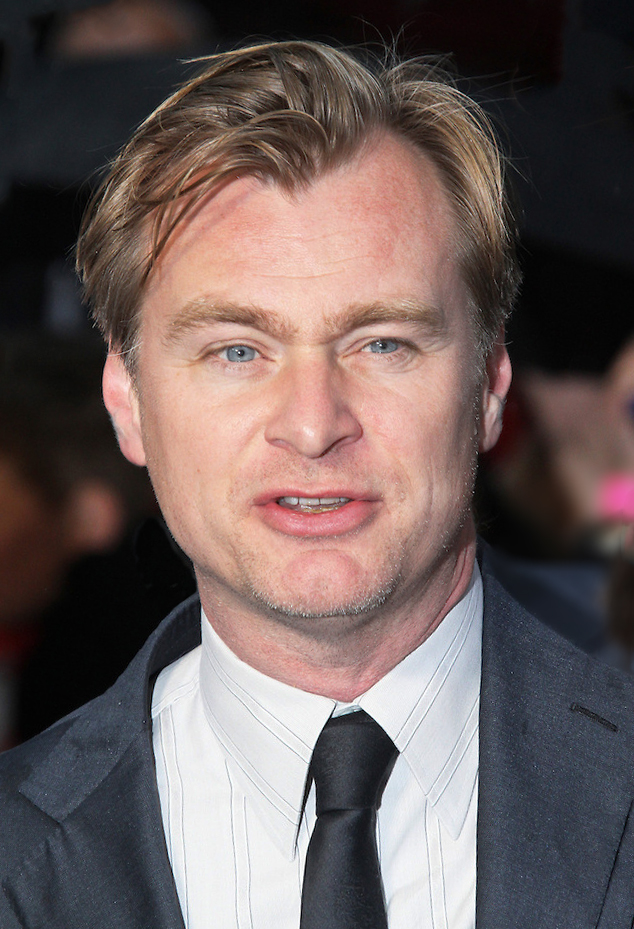
Christopher Nolan won for Oppenheimer (2023)

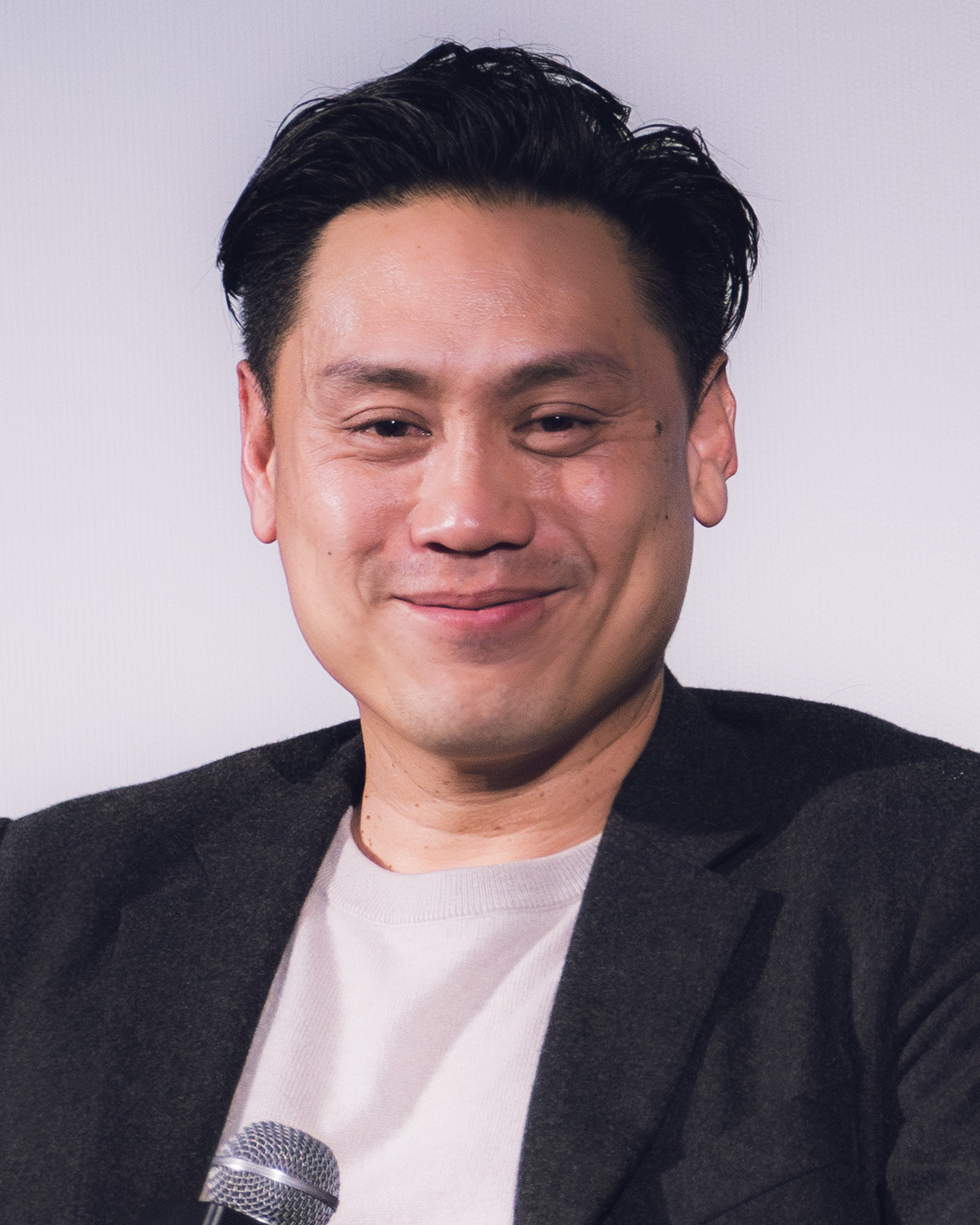
Jon M. Chu won for Wicked (2024)

=== 1990s ===
Year	Director	Film(s)
1995	Mel Gibson	Braveheart
1996	Anthony Minghella	The English Patient
1997	James Cameron	Titanic
1998	Steven Spielberg	Saving Private Ryan
1999	Sam Mendes	American Beauty

=== 2000s ===
Year	Director	Film(s)
2000	Steven Soderbergh	Erin Brockovich / Traffic
2000	Ridley Scott	Gladiator
2001	Ron Howard (TIE)	A Beautiful Mind
2001	Baz Luhrmann (TIE)	Moulin Rouge!
2001	Peter Jackson	The Lord of the Rings: The Fellowship of the Ring
2002	Steven Spielberg	Catch Me If You Can / Minority Report
2002	Roman Polanski	The Pianist
2002	Martin Scorsese	Gangs of New York
2003	Peter Jackson	The Lord of the Rings: The Return of the King
2003	Tim Burton	Big Fish
2003	Sofia Coppola	Lost in Translation
2003	Clint Eastwood	Mystic River
2003	Jim Sheridan	In America
2004	Martin Scorsese	The Aviator
2004	Clint Eastwood	Million Dollar Baby
2004	Marc Forster	Finding Neverland
2004	Taylor Hackford	Ray
2004	Alexander Payne	Sideways
2005	Ang Lee	Brokeback Mountain
2005	George Clooney	Good Night, and Good Luck
2005	Paul Haggis	Crash
2005	Ron Howard	Cinderella Man
2005	Steven Spielberg	Munich
2006	Martin Scorsese	The Departed
2006	Bill Condon	Dreamgirls
2006	Clint Eastwood	Letters from Iwo Jima
2006	Stephen Frears	The Queen
2006	Paul Greengrass	United 93
2007	Joel Coen and Ethan Coen	No Country for Old Men
2007	Tim Burton	Sweeney Todd: The Demon Barber of Fleet Street
2007	Sidney Lumet	Before the Devil Knows You're Dead
2007	Sean Penn	Into the Wild
2007	Julian Schnabel	The Diving Bell and the Butterfly
2007	Joe Wright	Atonement
2008	Danny Boyle	Slumdog Millionaire
2008	David Fincher	The Curious Case of Benjamin Button
2008	Ron Howard	Frost/Nixon
2008	Christopher Nolan	The Dark Knight
2008	Gus Van Sant	Milk
2009	Kathryn Bigelow	The Hurt Locker
2009	James Cameron	Avatar
2009	Lee Daniels	Precious
2009	Clint Eastwood	Invictus
2009	Jason Reitman	Up in the Air
2009	Quentin Tarantino	Inglourious Basterds

=== 2010s ===
Year	Director	Film
2010	David Fincher	The Social Network
2010	Darren Aronofsky	Black Swan
2010	Danny Boyle	127 Hours
2010	Joel Coen and Ethan Coen	True Grit
2010	Tom Hooper	The King's Speech
2010	Christopher Nolan	Inception
2011	Michel Hazanavicius	The Artist
2011	Stephen Daldry	Extremely Loud & Incredibly Close
2011	Alexander Payne	The Descendants
2011	Nicolas Winding Refn	Drive
2011	Martin Scorsese	Hugo
2011	Steven Spielberg	War Horse
2012	Ben Affleck	Argo
2012	Kathryn Bigelow	Zero Dark Thirty
2012	Tom Hooper	Les Misérables
2012	Ang Lee	Life of Pi
2012	David O. Russell	Silver Linings Playbook
2012	Steven Spielberg	Lincoln
2013	Alfonso Cuarón	Gravity
2013	Paul Greengrass	Captain Phillips
2013	Spike Jonze	Her
2013	Steve McQueen	12 Years a Slave
2013	David O. Russell	American Hustle
2013	Martin Scorsese	The Wolf of Wall Street
2014	Richard Linklater	Boyhood
2014	Wes Anderson	The Grand Budapest Hotel
2014	Ava DuVernay	Selma
2014	David Fincher	Gone Girl
2014	Alejandro G. Iñárritu	Birdman
2014	Angelina Jolie	Unbroken
2015	George Miller	Mad Max: Fury Road
2015	Todd Haynes	Carol
2015	Alejandro G. Iñárritu	The Revenant
2015	Tom McCarthy	Spotlight
2015	Ridley Scott	The Martian
2015	Steven Spielberg	Bridge of Spies
2016	Damien Chazelle	La La Land
2016	Mel Gibson	Hacksaw Ridge
2016	Barry Jenkins	Moonlight
2016	Kenneth Lonergan	Manchester by the Sea
2016	David Mackenzie	Hell or High Water
2016	Denis Villeneuve	Arrival
2016	Denzel Washington	Fences
2017	Guillermo del Toro	The Shape of Water
2017	Greta Gerwig	Lady Bird
2017	Luca Guadagnino	Call Me by Your Name
2017	Martin McDonagh	Three Billboards Outside Ebbing, Missouri
2017	Christopher Nolan	Dunkirk
2017	Jordan Peele	Get Out
2017	Steven Spielberg	The Post
2018	Alfonso Cuarón	Roma
2018	Damien Chazelle	First Man
2018	Bradley Cooper	A Star Is Born
2018	Peter Farrelly	Green Book
2018	Yorgos Lanthimos	The Favourite
2018	Spike Lee	BlacKkKlansman
2018	Adam McKay	Vice
2019	Sam Mendes (TIE)	1917
2019	Bong Joon Ho (TIE)	Parasite
2019	Noah Baumbach	Marriage Story
2019	Greta Gerwig	Little Women
2019	Josh Safdie and Benny Safdie	Uncut Gems
2019	Martin Scorsese	The Irishman
2019	Quentin Tarantino	Once Upon a Time in Hollywood

=== 2020s ===
Year	Director	Film
2020	Chloé Zhao	Nomadland
2020	Lee Isaac Chung	Minari
2020	Emerald Fennell	Promising Young Woman
2020	David Fincher	Mank
2020	Regina King	One Night in Miami...
2020	Spike Lee	Da 5 Bloods
2020	Aaron Sorkin	The Trial of the Chicago 7
2021	Jane Campion	The Power of the Dog
2021	Paul Thomas Anderson	Licorice Pizza
2021	Kenneth Branagh	Belfast
2021	Guillermo del Toro	Nightmare Alley
2021	Steven Spielberg	West Side Story
2021	Denis Villeneuve	Dune
2022	Daniel Kwan and Daniel Scheinert	Everything Everywhere All at Once
2022	James Cameron	Avatar: The Way of Water
2022	Damien Chazelle	Babylon
2022	Todd Field	Tár
2022	Baz Luhrmann	Elvis
2022	Martin McDonagh	The Banshees of Inisherin
2022	Sarah Polley	Women Talking
2022	Gina Prince-Bythewood	The Woman King
2022	S. S. Rajamouli	RRR
2022	Steven Spielberg	The Fabelmans
2023	Christopher Nolan	Oppenheimer
2023	Bradley Cooper	Maestro
2023	Greta Gerwig	Barbie
2023	Yorgos Lanthimos	Poor Things
2023	Alexander Payne	The Holdovers
2023	Martin Scorsese	Killers of the Flower Moon
2024	Jon M. Chu	Wicked
2024	Jacques Audiard	Emilia Pérez
2024	Sean Baker	Anora
2024	Edward Berger	Conclave
2024	Brady Corbet	The Brutalist
2024	Coralie Fargeat	The Substance
2024	RaMell Ross	Nickel Boys
2024	Denis Villeneuve	Dune: Part Two
2025	Paul Thomas Anderson	One Battle After Another
2025	Ryan Coogler	Sinners
2025	Guillermo del Toro	Frankenstein
2025	Josh Safdie	Marty Supreme
2025	Joachim Trier	Sentimental Value
2025	Chloé Zhao	Hamnet

== Awards breakdown ==
=== Multiple winners ===
2 wins

- Alfonso Cuarón
- Sam Mendes
- Martin Scorsese
- Steven Spielberg

=== Multiple nominees ===
2 nominations

- Paul Thomas Anderson
- Kathryn Bigelow
- Danny Boyle
- Tim Burton
- Ethan Coen
- Joel Coen
- Bradley Cooper
- Alfonso Cuarón
- Paul Greengrass
- Tom Hooper
- Alejandro González Iñárritu
- Peter Jackson
- Yorgos Lanthimos
- Ang Lee
- Spike Lee
- Baz Luhrmann
- Martin McDonagh
- Sam Mendes
- David O. Russell
- Josh Safdie (one shared with his brother Benny)
- Ridley Scott
- Quentin Tarantino
- Denis Villeneuve
- Chloe Zhao

3 nominations

- James Cameron
- Damien Chazelle
- Guillermo del Toro
- Greta Gerwig
- Ron Howard
- Alexander Payne

4 nominations

- Clint Eastwood
- David Fincher
- Christopher Nolan

7 nominations

- Martin Scorsese

9 nominations

- Steven Spielberg

== See also ==
- BAFTA Award for Best Direction
- Academy Award for Best Director
- Golden Globe Award for Best Director
- Independent Spirit Award for Best Director
- Directors Guild of America Award for Outstanding Directing – Feature Film
