= Bernard Chazelle =

French computer scientist (born 1955)

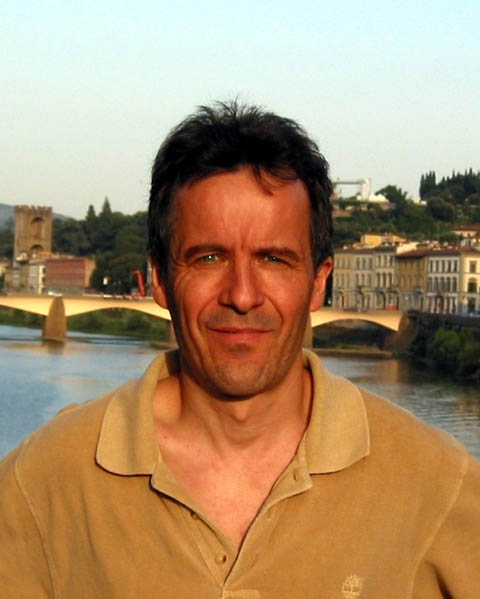
- Born: November 5, 1955 (age 70); Clamart, France
- Citizenship: France; United States
- Education: École des mines de Paris; Yale University
- Occupation: Computer scientist
- Spouse: Celia Chazelle
- Children: 2, including Damien
- Scientific career
- Fields: Computer science
- Workplaces: Princeton University
- Doctoral advisor: David P. Dobkin
- Doctoral students: Nadia Heninger

Bernard Chazelle (born November 5, 1955) is a French computer scientist. He is the Eugene Higgins Professor of Computer Science at Princeton University. Much of his work is in computational geometry, where he is known for his study of algorithms, such as linear-time triangulation of a simple polygon, as well as major complexity results, such as lower bound techniques based on discrepancy theory. He is also known for his invention of the soft heap data structure and the most asymptotically efficient known deterministic algorithm for finding minimum spanning trees.

== Early life ==
Chazelle was born in Clamart, France, the son of Marie-Claire (née Blanc) and Jean Chazelle. He grew up in Paris, France, where he received his bachelor's degree and master's degree in applied mathematics at the École des mines de Paris in 1977. Then, at the age of 21, he attended Yale University in the United States, where he received his PhD in computer science in 1980 under the supervision of David P. Dobkin.

== Career ==
Chazelle accepted professional appointments at institutions such as Brown, NEC, Xerox PARC, the Institute for Advanced Study, and the Paris institutions École normale supérieure, École polytechnique, Inria, and Collège de France. He is a fellow of the ACM, the American Academy of Arts and Sciences, the John Simon Guggenheim Memorial Foundation, and NEC, as well as a member of the European Academy of Sciences. He has also written essays about music and politics.

== Personal life ==
Chazelle is married to Celia Chazelle. He is the father of director Damien Chazelle, the youngest person in history to win an Academy Award for Best Director, and Anna Chazelle, an entertainer.

== Works ==
- The Discrepancy Method: Randomness and Complexity. Cambridge University Press. 2000. ISBN 978-0-521-00357-5.

== See also ==
- Chazelle polyhedron
