= Anna Chazelle =

American actress (active since 2009)

- Born: September 14; Princeton
- Citizenship: United States; France
- Education: New York University (BFA)
- Occupation: Actress
- Years active: 2009–present

Anna Chazelle is an American actor, writer and director. She is the younger sister of filmmaker Damien Chazelle.

== Life ==
Chazelle was born and raised in Princeton, graduated from New York University. After graduation, she continued her training at the Atlantic Acting School, the Shakespeare Forum, and the Ken Schatz Studio. She made her directorial debut in 2014 with a short film called The Pitch, then going on to write, direct and star in the post-apocalyptic short Narrow, which premiered at the Fantasia Film Festival in summer 2020 and was an official selection at the Academy Award qualifying HollyShorts Film Festival.

She is a co-founding member of the NYC-based performance troupe The Gyronauts, and also worked with Aerial Acrobat Entertainment. In 2021, she has signed on to write, direct and exec produce an untitled horror film based on the Greek legend of Medusa for Fangoria Studios. She is also set to direct the latest film adaptation in the Elmore Leonard literary canon.

== Filmography ==
=== Film ===
Year	Title	Role	Notes
2010	Guy and Madeline on a Park Bench	Laura	
2016	La La Land	Sarah / Hula Hooper	
2018	First Man	White House Staffer	
2021	Narrow	Sloane	
2022	Babylon	Bobbie Hart	Nominated – Screen Actors Guild Award for Outstanding Performance by a Cast in a Motion Picture
