= Bhavani Raman =

Indian historian

- Citizenship: Indian
- Occupations: Associate professor, University of Toronto, Canada

Academic background
- Education: University of Michigan, Jawaharlal Nehru University

Academic work
- Notable works: Document Raj: Writing and Scribes in Early Colonial South India (2012)

Bhavani Raman is an Indian historian. She is an associate professor and associate chair (teaching) at the Historical and Cultural Studies Department at the University of Toronto. Her research lie at the intersections of law, culture and intellectual histories of South Asia. She is the Chair of the Tamil Worlds Initiative, a tri-campus program on Tamil history, culture, and politics at the Scarborough campus of the University of Toronto.

== Education and family ==
Raman attended St Stephen's College, Delhi University where she graduated with honors in history. She obtained an M.Phil. for her thesis titled "The Emergence of the Public in Nineteenth Century Tamil Nadu" under the guidance of Prof. K.N. Panikkar at the Centre for Historical Studies, Jawaharlal Nehru University, Delhi.

== Career ==
=== Notable academic contribution ===
Document Raj

Raman’s PhD thesis was later published as her first book titled Document Raj: Writing and Scribes in Early Colonial South India (2012), a work on company rule in South Asia. Raman’s granular research on colonial bureaucratic writing practices renders the book a near-ethnography of the time, as the 18th century colonial cutcherry comes to life. Her method calls for close attention to media and practices of infrastructure, charting a new path in South Asian historiography. Document Raj demonstrates how regimes of legal and bureaucratic document production, writing practices and their effects on language pedagogy enabled new forms of power in colonial India. Document Raj studies the political, linguistic, and pedagogic connotations of written accountability by attending to its colonial career.

According to Dipesh Chakrabarty, “Document Raj breaks new ground in South Asian history. Raman’s imaginative investigations into the workings of the East India Company’s district offices in colonial Madras provide a powerful analysis of the critical role that scribal cultures played in enabling the Raj to operate as a vast writing machine. Original in its approach, this book will reinvigorate debates about the nature and consequences of colonial rule in the subcontinent.” Her works are highly relevant in Tamil historiography.

She has also edited two volumes With Prof. Daniel T. Rodgers and Prof. Helmut Reimitz, Cultures in Motion (2014) and with Dr Aparna Balachandran and Dr Rashmi Pant, Iterations of Law: Legal Histories from India (2018). The latter volume draws on Robert Cover’s claim to broaden the idea of law and legal meaning to include the normative universe that is built on custom, ethical and interpretative commitments. It urges historians to look for “the myriad appropriations of law to construct meaning” so that a “web of understanding that contests or aligns with the letter and spirit of the law” can be arrived at. She has also published more than a dozen of journal articles and public writings.

She is also the Digital Humanities Faculty Fellow 2022–2023, at the Jackman Humanities Institute, University of Toronto, where Raman is engaged in a research project on Chennai’s water archives. This project demonstrates the potential of lexicon-based research in Tamil to annotate hydrological geospatial data visualizations culled from colonial historical maps through research collaboration, self-learning, and skill sharing between researchers and community members.

== Awards ==
- Her doctoral dissertation at the University of Michigan under advisor Sumathy Ramaswamy was selected the best doctoral dissertation by University of California Los Angeles and awarded the prestigious Sardar Patel Award in 2007.
- International Dissertation Research Fellowship 2001 for Social Communication and the Emergence of Modern Publics in Colonial South India, 1790–1850.
