= Whiplash (2013 film) =

2013 short film directed by Damien Chazelle

- The film's poster
- Directed by: Damien Chazelle
- Written by: Damien Chazelle
- Produced by: Jason Blum; Nicholas Britell; Helen Estabrook
- Starring: J. K. Simmons; Johnny Simmons
- Cinematography: Edd Lukas
- Edited by: Tom Cross
- Music by: Justin Hurwitz
- Production companies: Blumhouse Productions; Whiplash Productions, LLC.
- Distributed by: Sony Pictures Classics
- Release date: January 18, 2013 (Sundance)
- Running time: 18 minutes
- Country: United States
- Language: English
- Budget: $23,000

Whiplash is a 2013 American drama short film written and directed by Damien Chazelle. It depicts the relationship between an impassioned and gifted jazz drummer (Johnny Simmons) and an abusive bandleader (J. K. Simmons; no relation to Johnny).

Whiplash premiered at the 2013 Sundance Film Festival on January 18, 2013, where it won the Short Film Jury Prize. It was then adapted into the feature film Whiplash (2014), which won three Academy Awards.

== Plot ==
Andrew Neiman is a first-year student at the prestigious Shaffer Conservatory in New York City. He has been playing drums from a young age and aspires to become a world-class drummer. Fletcher, conductor and bandleader of Shaffer Conservatory Studio Band, invites him into the ensemble as an alternate for core drummer Carl. However, Andrew quickly discovers that Fletcher is ruthlessly strict and abusive to his students. Fletcher asks a trombone player, Metz, if he was playing out of tune; when Metz answers yes, Fletcher screams at him and kicks him out, but admits that a different player played out of tune and he kicked Metz out for not knowing if he was out of tune or not. When the band rehearses the Hank Levy piece "Whiplash" and Andrew struggles to keep the tempo, Fletcher hurls a chair at him, slaps him, and berates him in front of the band.

== Cast ==
- Johnny Simmons as Andrew Neiman
- J. K. Simmons as Fletcher
- Nate Lang as Carl
- C. J. Vana as Metz

== Production ==
While attending Princeton High School, writer-director Damien Chazelle was in a "very competitive" jazz band and drew on the dread he felt in those years. He based the conductor, Terence Fletcher, on his former band instructor (who died in 2003) but "pushed it further," adding elements of Buddy Rich and other band leaders known for their harsh treatment. Chazelle said he wrote the film "initially in frustration" while trying to get his musical La La Land off the ground.

Right of Way Films and Blumhouse Productions helped Chazelle turn 15 pages of his original screenplay into the short film. The short was made for a modest $23,000 and its acclaim after debuting at the 2013 Sundance Film Festival attracted investors to produce the complete version of the script.

== Reception ==
The short film was very well received at Sundance, being compared to Full Metal Jacket, and winning the Short Film Jury Prize.

== Accolades ==
Award	Category	Recipient	Result
Aspen Shortsfest	BAFTA/LA Short Film Prize	Damien Chazelle	Won
Sundance Film Festival	Short Film Jury Award: U.S. Fiction	Damien Chazelle	Won
Sundance Film Festival	Short Film Grand Jury Prize	Damien Chazelle	Nominated
