= David P. Dobkin =

Computer scientist and university administrator

David Dobkin
- Born: February 29, 1948 (age 78); Pittsburgh, Pennsylvania
- Citizenship: American
- Education: MIT; Harvard University
- Awards: Guggenheim Fellow (1988); ACM Fellow (1997); Fulbright Fellow (2000)
- Scientific career
- Workplaces: Yale University; University of Arizona; Princeton University
- Thesis: On the arithmetic complexity of a class of arithmetic computations (1973)
- Doctoral advisor: Roger W. Brockett
- Doctoral students: Bernard Chazelle; Michael Ian Shamos; Deborah Silver; Diane Souvaine; Ayellet Tal

David Paul Dobkin is an American computer scientist and the Phillip Y. Goldman '86 Professor of Computer Science at Princeton University. His research has concerned computational geometry and computer graphics.

== Early life and education ==
Dobkin was born February 29, 1948, in Pittsburgh, Pennsylvania. He received a B.S. from the Massachusetts Institute of Technology in 1970 and then moved to Harvard University for his graduate studies, receiving a Ph.D. in applied mathematics in 1973 under the supervision of Roger W. Brockett.

== Career ==
He taught at Yale University and the University of Arizona before moving to Princeton in 1981. He was initially appointed to the Department of Electrical Engineering and Computer Science at Princeton and was subsequently named one of the first professors of Computer Science when that department was formed in 1985. In 1999, he became the first holder of the Goldman chair after its namesake donated two million dollars to the university. He was chair of the Computer Science Department at Princeton from 1994 to 2003, and in 2003 was appointed Dean of the Faculty. David Dobkin also chaired the governing board of The Geometry Center, a NSF-established research and education center at the University of Minnesota.

Dobkin has been on the editorial boards of eight journals.

== Recognition ==
In 1997 he was selected as a Fellow of the Association for Computing Machinery for his contributions to both fields.
