= Guy and Madeline on a Park Bench =

- Official poster
- Directed by: Damien Chazelle
- Written by: Damien Chazelle
- Produced by: Damien Chazelle; Mihai Dinulescu; Jasmine McGlade
- Starring: Jason Palmer; Desiree Garcia; Sandha Khin
- Cinematography: Damien Chazelle
- Edited by: William Adam W. Parker; Damien Chazelle
- Music by: Justin Hurwitz
- Production companies: Varilight Films; Olive Productions
- Distributed by: Variance Films
- Release dates: April 23, 2009 (Tribeca); November 5, 2010 (United States)
- Running time: 84 minutes
- Country: United States
- Languages: English; French
- Budget: $60,000
- Box office: $35,556

Guy and Madeline on a Park Bench is a 2009 American romantic musical film directed, written, produced, shot, and co-edited by Damien Chazelle in his feature directorial debut. The film is an independent film shot in black-and-white inspired by musicals of Classic Hollywood but presented in a vérité style reminiscent of the French New Wave. It stars Jason Palmer, Desiree Garcia and Sandha Khin. The film features a mixture of live jazz performances and choreographed tap dancing, as well as several more traditional musical numbers.

It had its world premiere at the Tribeca Film Festival on April 23, 2009. It was then released in a limited release on November 5, 2010, by Variance Films.

== Plot ==
In Boston, Massachusetts, Guy and Madeline, are a couple who has been dating for months decide to break up after Guy encounters a girl named Elena in the subway, which prompts him to search a relationship with her.

Guy and Elena's relation sours as months pass by as Elena seems more and more distant from Guy's passions. Madeline gets a job in New York City and meets Paul, a man with whom she begins a relationship.

After Guy remembers his memories with Madeline decides to search for her, one day they cross paths in the streets, as Madeline is about to move out to New York, however Guy asks her to listen to a ballad he wrote, despite the time limit before her trains departs, madelaine stays to watch Guy's performance, after the ballad the two smile, as they let the clock tick away.

== Production ==
Guy and Madeline on a Park Bench was shot on black and white 16mm film stock. Chazelle, who originally planned the project as his thesis film while an undergraduate at Harvard University, briefly left Harvard to focus on finishing the film.

The film features a cast of non-professional actors, though several are accomplished in other fields. Jason Palmer, who plays Guy, is a noted jazz trumpeter who was named one of the Top 25 Trumpeters of the Future by Downbeat magazine in 2007, and was the first trumpet player to be hired by acclaimed guitarist Kurt Rosenwinkel to perform with his quintet.

=== Music ===
The film features all original music, composed by Justin Hurwitz with lyrics by Chazelle. The orchestral score was performed by the Bratislava Symphony Orchestra, while the jazz numbers contained in the film were performed by the cast, often live. The soundtrack for the film Guy and Madeline on a Park Bench: Original Motion Picture Soundtrack was released through digital download on March 24, 2017, by Milan Records.

== Release ==
The film had its world premiere at the Tribeca Film Festival on April 23, 2009. It went on to screen at the AFI Fest on October 30, 2009. It also screened at the Thessalonki International Film Festival, Mar del Plata International Film Festival, Torino Film Festival (where it won the Special Jury Prize), Mill Valley Film Festival, Starz Denver Film Festival, Viennale, Sarajevo Film Festival, Calgary International Film Festival (where it was a nominee for the Mavericks Award), International Film Festival Prague and the Chicago International Movies and Music Festival (where it won the award for Best Fiction Feature). In March 2010, Variance Films acquired distribution rights to the film. The film was released in a limited release on November 5, 2010. The film was released on DVD by Cinema Guild on May 3, 2011.

== Reception ==
Guy and Madeline on a Park Bench received positive reviews from film critics. On the review aggregator website Rotten Tomatoes, 92% of 24 critics' reviews are positive, with an average rating of 7.4/10. The website's consensus reads: "Bursting with scrappy energy and shot with preternatural skill, Guy and Madeline on a Park Bench is an auspicious debut for director Damien Chazelle." On Metacritic, the film holds a rating of 83 out of 100, based on eleven critics, indicating "universal acclaim".

The film premiered to a strong critical reception during its festival run. The Village Voice called the film "the kind of movie a young Cassavetes might have made were he working for MGM's Freed Unit". The Boston Globe called it "the most buzzed-about movie at the prestigious Tribeca Film Festival". Time Out New York called it "blissful, brilliant", and noted "one sequence involving a tap dancer, a jam session, and a house party is arguably the most joyous five minutes you're likely to experience in a theater". Several reviewers called the film a "mumblecore musical". Amy Taubin of Film Comment, John Anderson of Variety, David Fear of Time Out New York and Elizabeth Weitzman of New York Daily News named it the best undistributed film of the year in 2009, and indieWIRE named it the #3 Best Undistributed Film of 2009 in its year-end critics' poll.
