= Damien Chazelle =

American and French filmmaker (born 1985)

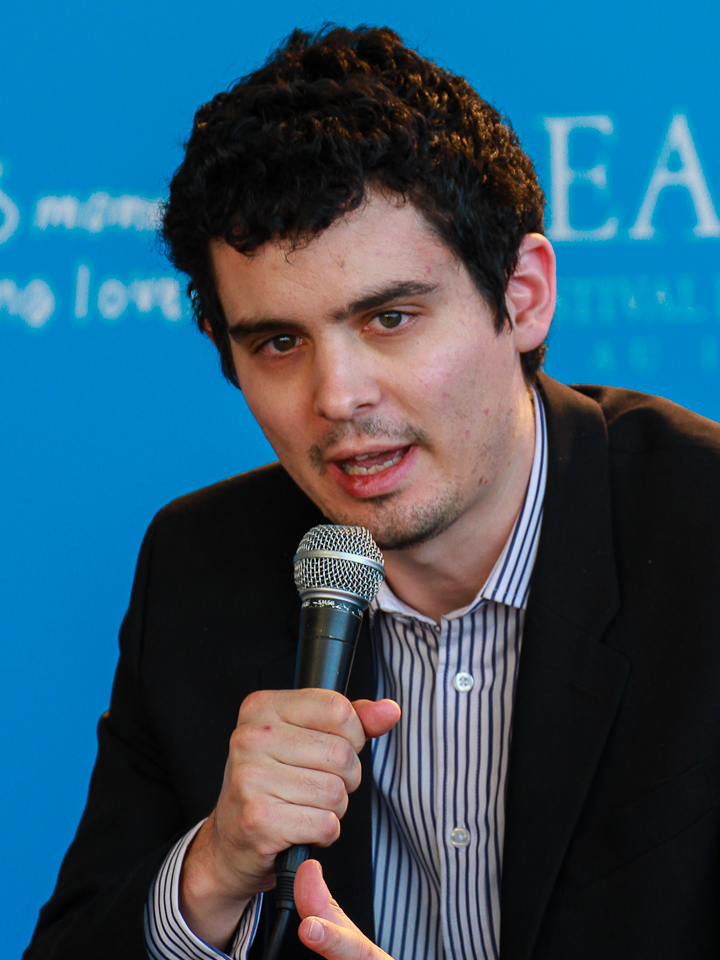
- Chazelle in 2014
- Born: Damien Sayre Chazelle; January 19, 1985 (age 41); Providence, Rhode Island, U.S.
- Citizenship: United States; France
- Education: Harvard University (BA)
- Occupations: Film director; screenwriter; producer
- Years active: 2008–present
- Spouses: Jasmine McGlade (m. 2010; div. 2014); Olivia Hamilton (m. 2018)
- Children: 2
- Parent(s): Bernard Chazelle; Celia Chazelle
- Awards: Full list

Damien Sayre Chazelle (/ʃəˈzɛl/; born January 19, 1985) is a French-American filmmaker. He directed the psychological drama Whiplash (2014), the musical romance La La Land (2016), the biographical drama First Man (2018), and the epic tragedy Babylon (2022).

For Whiplash, he was nominated for the Academy Award for Best Adapted Screenplay. His biggest commercial success came with La La Land, which was nominated for 14 Academy Awards, winning six including Best Director, making him the youngest person to win the award at age 32.

== Early life and education ==
Damien Sayre Chazelle was born in Providence, Rhode Island, to a Catholic family. His French-American father, Bernard Chazelle, is the Eugene Higgins Professor of computer science at Princeton University. His mother, Celia Chazelle, is from an English-Canadian family based in Calgary, Alberta, and teaches medieval history at The College of New Jersey.

Chazelle was raised in Princeton, New Jersey, where, although a Catholic, he attended a Hebrew school for four years due to his parents' dissatisfaction with his religious education at a church Sunday school.

Chazelle has a sister, Anna Chazelle, who is an actress. Their English-born maternal grandfather, John Martin, is the son of stage actress Eileen Earle.

Filmmaking was Chazelle's first love, but he subsequently wanted to be a musician and struggled to make it as a jazz drummer at Princeton High School. He has said that he had an intense music teacher in the Princeton High School Studio Band, who was the inspiration for the character of Terence Fletcher (J. K. Simmons) in Chazelle's breakout film Whiplash. Unlike the film's protagonist Andrew Neiman (Miles Teller), Chazelle stated that he knew instinctively that he never had the talent to be a great drummer and after high school, pursued filmmaking again. He studied filmmaking in the Visual and Environmental Studies department at Harvard University and graduated in 2007.

At Harvard, he lived in Currier House, sharing rooms with composer and frequent collaborator Justin Hurwitz. The two were among the original members of the indie-pop group Chester French, formed during their freshman year.

== Career ==
=== 2008–2013: Early work and career beginnings ===
Chazelle wrote and directed his debut feature, Guy and Madeline on a Park Bench, as part of his senior thesis project with classmate Justin Hurwitz at Harvard. The film premiered at Tribeca Film Festival in 2009 and received various awards on the festival circuit, before being picked up by Variance Films for limited release and opening to critical acclaim.

After graduation, Chazelle moved to Los Angeles with the ultimate goal of attracting interest to produce his musical romantic drama La La Land. He worked as a freelance writer in Hollywood; among his writing credits are The Last Exorcism Part II (2013) and Grand Piano (2013). He was also brought in by J. J. Abrams' Bad Robot to re-write a draft of 10 Cloverfield Lane (2016) with the intention of also directing, but Chazelle ultimately chose to direct Whiplash instead.

=== 2014–2019: Breakthrough, acclaim and accolades ===
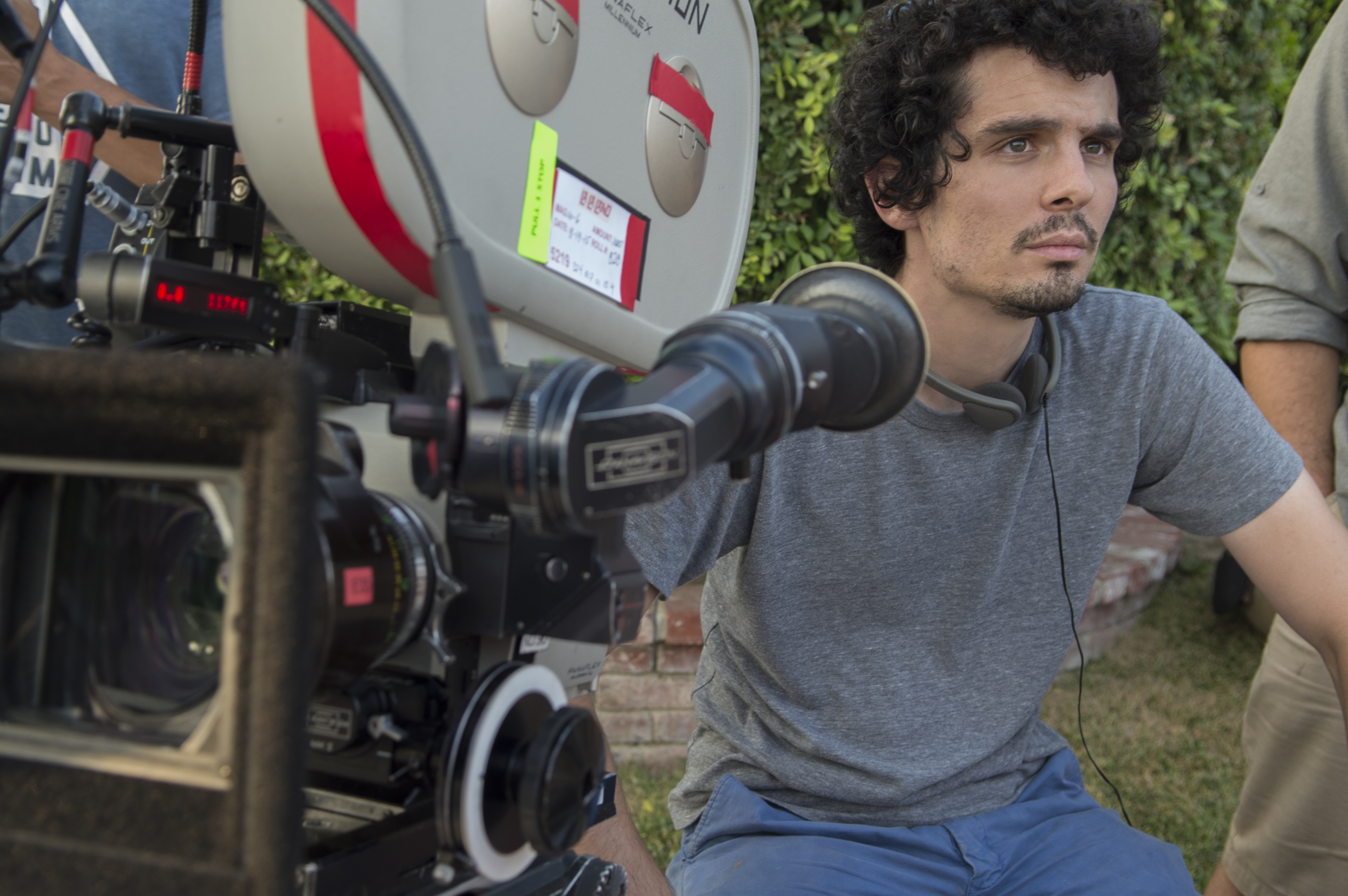
Chazelle on the set of La La Land in 2015

Chazelle initially described Whiplash as a writing reaction to being stuck on another script: "I just thought, that's not working, let me put it away and write this thing about being a jazz drummer in high school." He stated he initially did not want to show the script around, as it felt too personal, and "I put it in a drawer". Although nobody was initially interested in producing the film, his script was featured on The Black List in 2012 as one of the best unmade films of that year. The project was eventually picked up by Right of Way Films and Blumhouse Productions, who suggested that Chazelle turn a portion of his script into a short film as proof-of-concept. The 18-minute short was accepted at the 2013 Sundance Film Festival, where it was well-received; financing was then raised for the feature film, and, in 2014, it was released to a positive critical reaction. Whiplash received numerous awards on the festival circuit and earned five Oscar nominations, including Best Adapted Screenplay for Chazelle, winning three.

Thanks to the success of Whiplash, Chazelle was able to attract financiers for his musical romantic drama La La Land. The film opened the Venice International Film Festival on August 31, 2016, and began a limited release in the United States on December 9, 2016, with a wider release on December 16, 2016. It received universal acclaim and numerous awards. Chazelle received praise for his work on the film and received several top honors, including a Golden Globe and an Academy Award for Best Director, making Chazelle the youngest director to win each award, at age 32. A stage musical adaptation of the film is in development, with Ayad Akhtar and Matthew Decker adapting from Chazelle's script and Hurwitz, Benj Pasek and Justin Paul returning as songwriters after winning Golden Globes and Academy Awards for the score and original song "City of Stars". Marc Platt, another collaborator of Chazelle who produced this film and Babylon, will also return to produce the stage adaptation.

Chazelle next directed the biographical drama First Man (2018) for Universal Pictures. With a screenplay by Josh Singer, the biopic is based on author James R. Hansen's First Man: The Life of Neil A. Armstrong, written about the astronaut. The film starred Ryan Gosling as Neil Armstrong and Claire Foy as Janet Armstrong. The film received positive reviews, with Owen Gleiberman of Variety writing that "Chazelle orchestrates a dashingly original mood of adventure drenched in anxiety". It earned four Academy Award nominations for Best Production Design, Best Sound Editing, and Best Sound Mixing, winning for Best Visual Effects at the 91st Academy Awards.

In December 2019, he listed the films that inspired him for LaCinetek, a French streaming platform that collects lists of favorite films from filmmakers. Featuring 64 films, his selection includes works by Jacques Demy (The Umbrellas of Cherbourg), Stanley Kubrick (Eyes Wide Shut, Barry Lyndon), and Richard Linklater (Before Sunset).

=== 2020–present ===
Chazelle directed the first two episodes of the May 2020-released Netflix musical drama television miniseries The Eddy. The series is written by Jack Thorne, with Grammy-winning songwriter Glen Ballard and Alan Poul attached as executive producers. The series starred André Holland and Joanna Kulig and was set in Paris consisting of eight episodes.

In July 2019, Variety reported that his next film, called Babylon, set in 1920s Hollywood, was scheduled to be released in 2021, co-produced by his wife, Olivia Hamilton. Chazelle was eyeing Emma Stone to star; In December 2020, it was reported that Margot Robbie was in talks to replace Stone. The Hollywood Reporter reported that Babylon would have a limited release on December 25, 2022, before expanding into wide release on January 6, 2023. The film's final cast included Margot Robbie, Brad Pitt, Li Jun Li, Jovan Adepo and Jean Smart. The film was a box office bomb receiving $4.5 million opening weekend. Many industry experts predicted that the film would need to make $250 million just to break even against its $80 million budget and marketing costs. The film received polarizing reviews. Manhola Dargis of The New York Times wrote, "Throughout this disappointing movie, what's missing is the one thing that defined the silent era at its greatest and to which Chazelle remains bafflingly oblivious: its art." At the same time, Wall Street Journal film critic Kyle Smith called the movie "one of the year's most ambitious and impressive works."

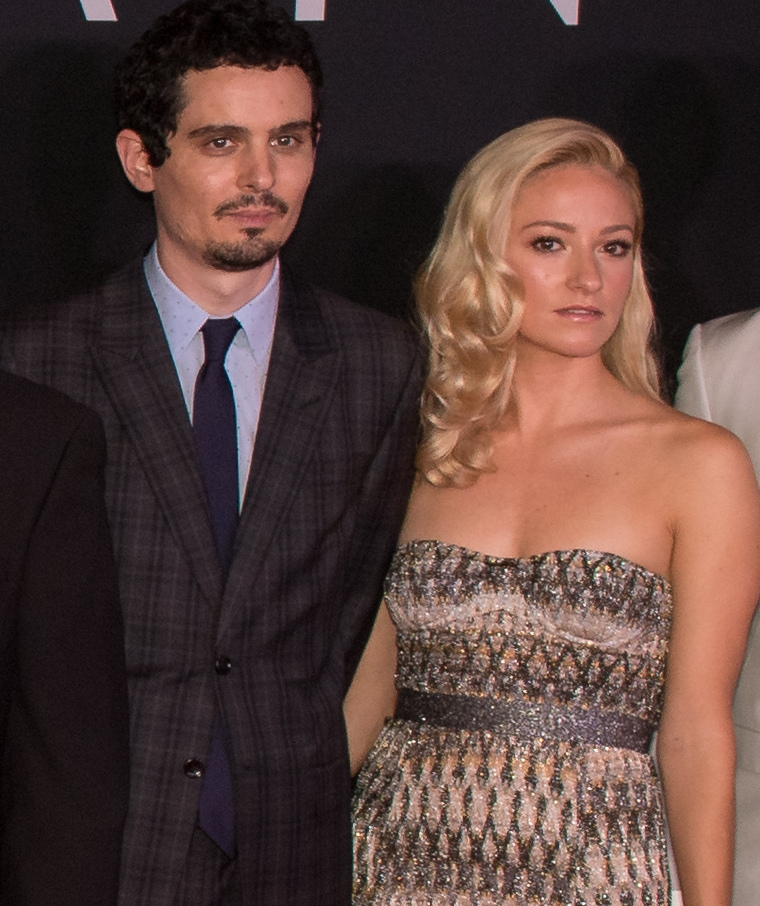
Chazelle and Hamilton in 2018

In December 2022, Chazelle and Hamilton signed a first-look deal with Paramount Pictures. In April 2024, it was reported that Chazelle would produce his next film, a prison drama set for release in 2025, alongside his wife Hamilton under their Wild Chickens Productions banner. In December 2024, it was reported that Chazelle's next film would instead be a biopic about Evel Knievel, with Leonardo DiCaprio and Adrien Brody in talks to star, from a script by William Monahan. However, once production plans were on pause as DiCaprio weighed up his involvement, Chazelle pivoted back to working on the prison drama.

== Personal life ==
Chazelle married producer Jasmine McGlade in 2010; they divorced in 2014. In October 2017, Chazelle and actress Olivia Hamilton, a Princeton University graduate and former McKinsey & Company consultant, announced their engagement, and they married September 22, 2018. They have a son who was born in November 2019. Their second child was born in December 2022. Chazelle is fluent in French.

== Filmography ==
=== Feature film ===
Year	Title	Director	Writer	Producer	Notes
2009	Guy and Madeline on a Park Bench	Yes	Yes	Yes	Also credited as cinematographer and editor; Played the uncredited role of the drumming instructor
2013	The Last Exorcism Part II	No	Yes	No	
2013	Grand Piano	No	Yes	No	
2014	Whiplash	Yes	Yes	No	
2016	10 Cloverfield Lane	No	Yes	No	
2016	La La Land	Yes	Yes	No	
2018	First Man	Yes	No	Yes	
2022	Babylon	Yes	Yes	No	
TBA	Untitled film	Yes	Yes	Yes	

Co-producer

- Maria My Love (2011)

Executive producer

- Heart of the Beast (2026)

=== Short film ===
Director

- Whiplash (2013) (Also writer)
- The Stunt Double (2020)
- Perfetto. Espresso Made Right (2021)
- Cartier: A Season Tale (2024)

Cinematographer

- Day and Night (2008)

Producer

- Surrogate (2016)

Associate producer

- After Laughter (2021)

=== Television ===
Year	Title	Director	Executive producer	Note
2020	The Eddy	Yes	Yes	2 episodes

== Awards and nominations ==
Year	Title	Academy Awards		BAFTA Awards		Golden Globe Awards	
Year	Title	Nominations	Wins	Nominations	Wins	Nominations	Wins
2014	Whiplash	5	3	5	3	1	1
2016	La La Land	14	6	11	5	7	7
2018	First Man	4	1	7		2	1
2022	Babylon	3		3	1	5	1
Total		26	10	26	9	15	10

Directed Academy Award performances
Under Chazelle's direction, these actors have received Academy Award wins and nominations for their performances in their respective roles.

Year	Performer	Film	Result
Academy Award for Best Actor
2016	Ryan Gosling	La La Land	Nominated
Academy Award for Best Actress
2016	Emma Stone	La La Land	Won
Academy Award for Best Supporting Actor
2014	J. K. Simmons	Whiplash	Won

== See also ==
- List of Academy Award records
- List of oldest and youngest Academy Award winners and nominees – Youngest winners for Best Director
- List of French Academy Award winners and nominees
- List of superlative Academy Award winners and nominees
- List of Golden Globe winners
