= Ambassadors Theatre (London) =

West End theatre in London

- New Ambassadors Theatre (1999–2007)
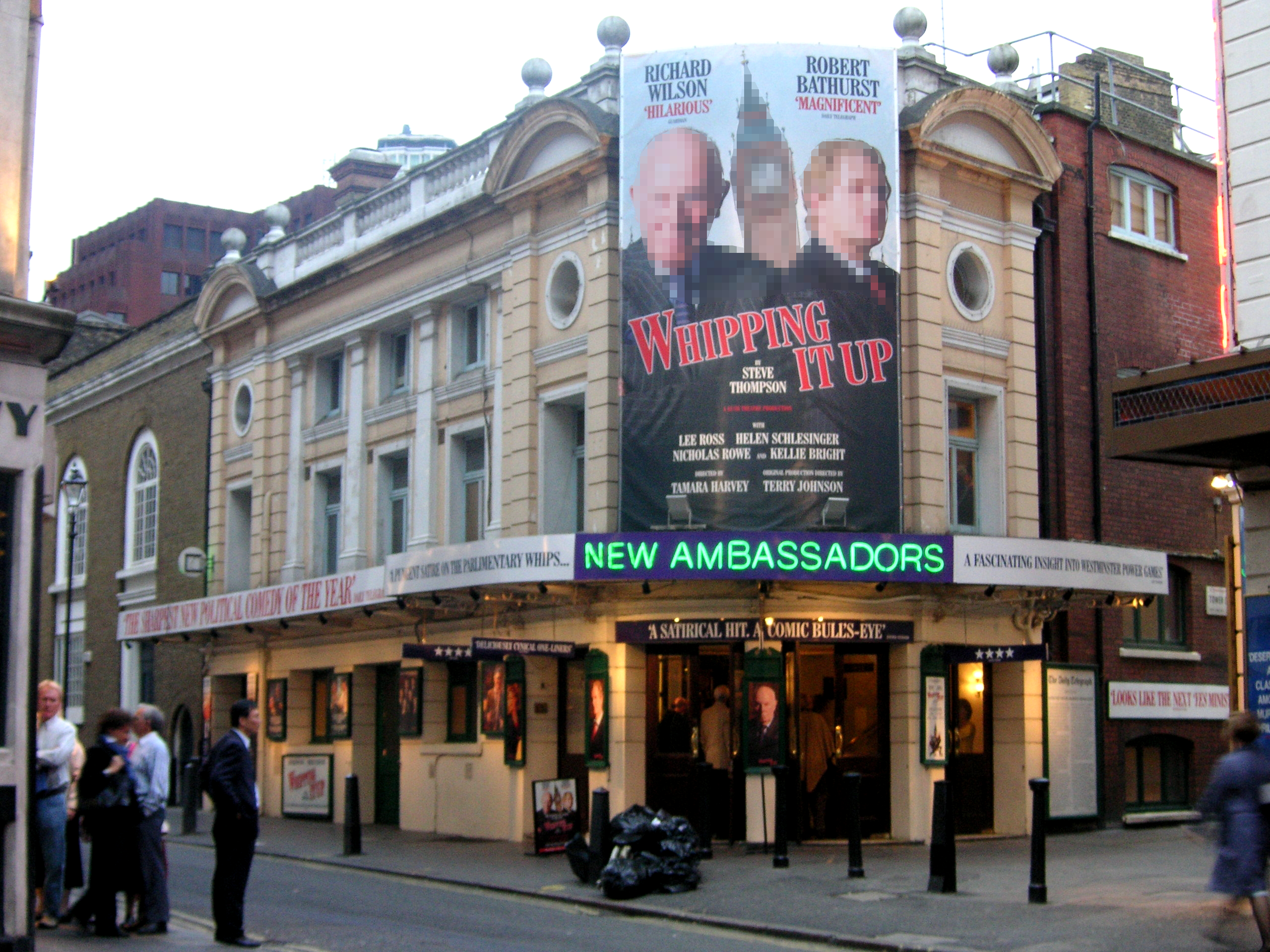
- The Ambassadors Theatre in April 2007
- Interactive map of Ambassadors Theatre
- Address: West Street; London, WC2; United Kingdom
- Coordinates: 51.51292°N 0.12785°W
- Owner: ATG Entertainment
- Capacity: 406
- Type: West End theatre
- Designation: Grade II
- Production: Paranormal Activity
- Public transit: Covent Garden; Leicester Square

Construction
- Opened: 5 June 1913; 113 years ago
- Architect: W. G. R. Sprague

Website
- Ambassadors Theatre website

The Ambassadors Theatre (known as the New Ambassadors Theatre from 1999 to 2007) is a West End theatre located on West Street, next to St Martin's Theatre and opposite The Ivy, in the City of Westminster. Opened in 1913, it is one of the smallest of West End theatres, seating just over four hundred people. (Note: Several sources state that the capacity is 444, but the theatre's current leaseholder gives the amount as 406.)

== Building ==
Previous applications to build a new theatre on the site of the Ambassadors had been rejected due to the narrowness of the surrounding streets. In 1912 architect W G R Sprague was granted permission for his "comparatively small theatre" (506 seated, 40 standing) on the condition that the adjacent Tower Court was widened to twenty feet. The theatre was designed by Sprague with a Classical style exterior and Louis XVI style interiors, and built by Kingerlee and Sons of Oxford; its intended height had to be lowered due to a neighbouring building's "ancient lights," resulting in the stalls being situated below ground level.

The Ambassadors was conceived as one of a pair of theatres with its eventual neighbour St. Martin's, but although the former was completed by June 1913, construction of the latter was delayed by the outbreak of war.

The theatre was awarded the status of a Grade II Listed Building by English Heritage in March 1973.

== Management ==
At its opening in June 1913, the Ambassadors was leased by Durrant Swan and managed by John Herbert Jay. A year later, Charles B. Cochran took on the lease and, seeking to offer the public a distraction from the war, introduced to London a series of successful "intimate" revues inspired by those in Paris.

In 1996 the theatre was bought by the Ambassador Theatre Group. The auditorium was divided into two smaller spaces by the creation of a temporary floor at circle level, to accommodate a residency by the Royal Court Theatre during the reconstruction of their venue. In 1999 the residency ended and the theatre was returned to its original design, renamed the New Ambassadors Theatre.

In 2007 the theatre was acquired by Stephen Waley-Cohen, who reinstated its original name and began an extensive programme of refurbishments. In 2014, it was reported that Delfont Mackintosh Theatres had bought the theatre and planned to rename it after Stephen Sondheim. The purchase did not complete, and in 2018 the theatre was reacquired by ATG for £12 million.

== Recent and present productions ==
The Ambassadors opened on 5 June 1913 with a production of Monckton Hoffe's Panthea that played fifteen performances. The following year saw the introduction of the revue Odds and Ends—written by Harry Grattan and Edward Jones and introducing new star Alice Delysia—followed by its sequel More, which collectively ran for more than 500 performances.

The theatre is most famous for presenting the original production of the longest-running play in history, Agatha Christie’s The Mousetrap. The second of Christie's plays to have been performed at the theatre, preceded by Murder on the Nile (1946), The Mousetrap opened on 25 November 1952 directed by Peter Cotes and starring Richard Attenborough and Sheila Sim. The production broke the record for the longest West End run on 12 April 1958, and passed the 5000 performance mark on 9 December 1964. It continued to run at the Ambassadors until 23 March 1974, at which point it transferred to St Martin's Theatre, opened two days later, and continues to run today.

The theatre presented the world premiere of Noël Coward’s comedy Hay Fever, opening on 8 June 1925 to “amiable” notices, directed by the author and starring Marie Tempest as Judith Bliss. Three months later the play transferred to the Criterion Theatre, and its reputation has endured through numerous revivals and adaptations. Another of Coward's plays, Fallen Angels, was presented at the theatre in 1949, in a Shakespeare Memorial Theatre production directed by Willard Stoker and starring Hermione Baddeley and Hermione Gingold.

A number of Eugene O’Neill’s plays have been presented at the theatre, including at least two English premieres: The Emperor Jones (1925) and The Hairy Ape (1931), both starring Paul Robeson. The latter was forced to close after only five performances due to Robeson contracting severe laryngitis. Two of Harold Pinter’s plays, The Hothouse (1980) and Ashes to Ashes (1996), and two of Conor McPherson’s, The Weir (1997) and Port Authority (2001), also had their West End premieres at the theatre.

Other West End premieres of note have included:

- If by Lord Dunsany (1921)
- The Torch-Bearers by George Kelly (1925)
- Escape by John Galsworthy (1926), world premiere
- Rope by Patrick Hamilton (1929)
- The Late Edwina Black by William Dinner & William Morum (1949)
- The Fourposter by Jan de Hartog (1950)
- Murder Mistaken by Janet Green (1952)
- Dear Daddy by Denis Cannan (1976)
- 84 Charing Cross Road by James Roose-Evans (1981)
- Intimate Exchanges by Alan Ayckbourn (1984)
- The Cryptogram by David Mamet (1994), world premiere
- Trainspotting by Harry Gibson adapting Irvine Welsh (1995)
- Shopping and F**king by Mark Ravenhill (1996)
- East is East by Ayub Khan-Din (1996)
- Spoonface Steinberg by Lee Hall (1999)
- Stones in His Pockets by Marie Jones (2000)
- The Vagina Monologues by Eve Ensler (2001)
- Harry Clarke by David Cale, starring Billy Crudup (9 March - 11 May 2024)
- Kathy and Stella Solve a Murder! by Jon Brittain and Matthew Floyd Jones (25 May - 14 September 2024)
- The Curious Case of Benjamin Button by Jethro Compton (10 October 2024 - 11 October 2025)
- Paranormal Activity by Levi Holloway (5 December 2025 - 25 April 2026, & 8 August 2026 - 2 January 2027)
- 1536 by Ava Pickett (2 May - 1 August 2026)

Vivien Leigh made her West End debut in the Ambassadors, starring in The Mask of Virtue (1935); this was the play in which Laurence Olivier first saw her perform.

Recent productions have included the multi-award-winning production of John Doyle's Sweeney Todd which subsequently transferred to Broadway, Ying Tong – A Walk with the Goons, Someone Who'll Watch Over Me, Journey's End and the world première of Kate Betts' On the Third Day which won the Channel 4 television series The Play's the Thing. In 2006, the theatre played host to the landmark revival of Peter Hall's production of Waiting for Godot which ran for a strictly limited autumn season.

Recent productions include the Menier Chocolate Factory production of Little Shop of Horrors, the Bush Theatre's production of Whipping it Up, starring Richard Wilson and Robert Bathurst, and Love Song, starring Cillian Murphy and Neve Campbell (November 2006 to February 2007).

In September 2007, renowned dance show Stomp transferred to the theatre for a ten-year run, which had its last performance in January 2018.

== Nearby Tube stations ==
- Leicester Square
- Covent Garden
