= Paranormal Activity (play) =

2014 stage play by Levi Holloway

- 2026 Broadway production poster
- Original language: English
- Written by: Levi Holloway
- Based on: Paranormal Activity by Oren Peli
- Genre: Horror

Premiere
- Date: 4 July 2024
- Place: Courtyard Theatre, Leeds Playhouse
- paranormalonstage.com

Paranormal Activity is a horror play written by Levi Holloway, based on the film series of the same name, set in the world of the film series. The play premiered at Leeds Playhouse in July 2024, had its West End premiere at the Ambassadors Theatre on 5 December 2025, and opened on Broadway in the August Wilson Theatre in August 2026.

== Premise ==
The stage adaptation of Paranormal Activity is an original story that follows a new couple not featured in any of the films. The newly married couple, James and Lou, move from Chicago to London to get a fresh start only to learn that they cannot escape their past. However, the supernatural entity that turns both their lives upside down follows them to their new home. James tries his best to comfort and support a struggling Lou. Though the hauntings cause a strain on their marriage, they soon realize they must work together to confront the malevolent entity.

== Synopsis ==
=== Act 1 ===
Louise "Lou" Singer and her husband James have recently moved to London from Chicago for James's job.

James returns from work while on a call with his mother Carolanne, who lives in Florida. He pulls a reticent Lou into the call, in which Carolanne asks about potential grandchildren and expresses concern about Lou taking antidepressants.

Lou storms upstairs, having asked James not to mention the medication to his mother. They have a brief conversation where we learn that although Carolanne raised James as a devout Christian, he no longer believes in God.

Lou expresses fear that her "blackouts" (episodes of lost time) have followed them from Chicago. She explains that it is her that is haunted, not the places she lives. James gifts Lou a replica of Arthur Conan Doyle's bell.

The power suddenly goes out, and the alarm system is tripped. The couple go downstairs to find a bird has collided with their front door and died.

Some time later, the couple fight again about whether there is a spirit haunting them. Lou angrily exits and goes upstairs, putting on a hooded bathrobe and hiding in the nursery. James apologizes and calls that he will he making dinner, and Lou eventually comes downstairs to help. While she faces away from the audience, James continues speaking. From upstairs, another Lou appears out of the nursery asking who James is talking to, and the hooded bathrobe in the kitchen collapses, revealing nothing beneath it.

Later, when James again investigates another power outage, he goes upstairs to the nursery to check inside, but the door now opens to a wall. On the wall are a set of repeated numbers.

Lou and James now both believe something supernatural is happening, and contact Dr. Cotgrave, a parapsychologist whose podcast Lou listens to. Cotgrave attempts a seance, in which it is revealed that Lou's childhood home was burnt down, killing both her parents. Cotgrave establishes a connection with a spirit claiming to be Lou's mother and saying Lou was not to blame -- Lou becomes panicked and says her mother was not in the room when the house burned down, and all of the doors and windows in the house slam open. A light darts across the room and up the stairs into the nursery, slamming the door. Cotgrave reveals that she is a fraud and tells the couple there is something seriously wrong here. Her face suddenly smooths as she smiles and tells them they will die in this house.

=== Act 2 ===
Act II opens on the couple sleeping on their couch downstairs. A shadow crosses the room to stand over them, and an invisible hand pulls their blanket slowly down. Lou seems to awake and stands up, and the shadow flees. Lou then silently wanders around the house. James awakes to find her gone, and chases her through and around the house until they are face to face and she tells him to kiss her. Unnerved, James tries, and Lou seems to truly awake, trembling, and collapses in his arms.

Later, James has constructed a conspiracy board involving the numbers from the nursery wall. He attempts to share with Lou what he considers relevant Bible verses. Lou expresses surprise and dismay that he still has a copy of the Bible.

Lou repeatedly lights and douses a candle upstairs, and from the darkness a hand reaches out to grasp her shoulder, but quickly vanishes.

Carolanne calls James again, restarting the conversation about children. She says that Lou may not be a fit mother, and continues to say that James would be a poor father as well. She begins to berate James, and eventually encourages him to "eat a bullet." Before he can respond, she tells him to "open the door," as a loud knock on the front door is heard. The call cuts, and James hesitantly opens the door. After a long moment, his mother (in-person) jumps from hiding, scaring him. She comes into the house, and Lou comes downstairs to see Carolanne in the house.

When told about the haunting, Carolanne alludes to a time in James's youth where he spent a distressed night praying with his mother until the sun came up. She takes James's hand and they begin to pray. Lou declines to join. After, Carolanne seems to change, and once again tells James to answer the front door as someone outside knocks. As James and Lou cower, Carolanne shuts and locks the door, turns toward them, mockingly playing peek-a-boo with James. On the last repetition, she raises her hands to her face and claws out her eyes as blood cascades down her face.

Some time later, Lou and James sit together, quietly contemplating. Lou lays out a blanket and some food, referencing her and James's first date on a picnic, and asks if James wants to have their last date.

She prompts James to confess. When he seems unsure, she tells him about the fire that consumed her childhood home. She explains her parents were abusive alcoholics, who once left a seven-year-old Lou trapped in her room while they drank and eventually passed out downstairs. Young Lou picks the lock, goes to the kitchen to turn on the gas, and sets the house on fire.

After admitting to her parents' murders, James is pressured to confess his equally horrible sin. When he was twenty, while he was driving drunk, he attempted to take a blind curve at a high speed on a dark country road. He hits what he assumes is a raccoon, but upon exiting the vehicle he realizes he has hit a child, who has fallen into a nearby ditch. He flees the scene to go home, and he and his mother pray until dawn. Two days later, the newspapers report the body of a young girl found in the creek.

Lou tells James again to kiss her. Upon breaking from the kiss, James says he remembers what the numbers mean -- Lou tells him she is proud of him, and then says "your wife would be proud too." Lou, possessed by the spirit of the young girl that James killed, explains that the numbers were James's license plate, the last thing she ever saw.

In a panic, James flees out the door, only to be hit by an oncoming car. Lou silently walks to the door, and suddenly collapses, revealing the ghost is here, covered in blood and grime, having fatally stabbed Lou. The show ends as the bell from earlier clangs repeatedly.

== Production history ==
=== United Kingdom ===
Paranormal Activity premiered in the Courtyard Theatre at Leeds Playhouse, where it played from 4 July until 3 August 2024. The premiere production was directed by Felix Barrett.

The play transferred to London's West End beginning performances at the Ambassadors Theatre on 5 December 2025, and was scheduled to close after a 12-week limited run on 28 February 2026. However, due to popular demand, the West End run was extended through 28 March 2026, before receiving a second extension through 25 April 2026. The production returned to the Ambassadors Theatre (following a run of the play 1536) from 8 August 2026. It was originally due to run until 4 January 2027, but has been extended until 27 February 2027.

The play also began a UK and Ireland tour at the Richmond Theatre from 7 September 2026, running until May 2027.

=== North America ===
Following the run in Leeds, the play made its US premiere on a tour which opened at the Chicago Shakespeare Theater on 8 October 2025 where it played through 2 November 2025. The production also played at the Ahmanson Theatre in Los Angeles, the Shakespeare Theatre Company in Washington, D.C., and the American Conservatory Theater in San Francisco. Barrett's direction was restaged by playwright Holloway, with Patrick Heusinger reprising his London role as James in Chicago and Los Angeles, joined by an American cast including Shannon Cochran as Carolanne. Following a pre-Broadway run at the Emerson Colonial Theatre in Boston in July, the play began previews on Broadway at the August Wilson Theatre on 14 August prior to an official opening on 25 August for a limited run, with Jason Blum and Blumhouse Productions joining the production team. The production stars Cher Álvarez as Lou, Travis A. Knight as James, Cochran as Carolanne and Eva Kaminsky joining the cast as Etheline Cotgrave, and run through 28 February 2027.

A production of the play was performed at the Ed Mirvish Theatre in Toronto from 9 June to 5 July 2026, starring the play's original London cast.

== Cast and principal roles ==
Role	Leeds Playhouse	US Tour	West End	Broadway	UK tour
Role	2024	2025	2025	2026	2026
James	Patrick Heusinger	Patrick Heusinger	Patrick Heusinger	Travis A. Knight	James Bye
Lou	Melissa James	Cher Álvarez	Melissa James	Cher Álvarez	Hannah Sinclair Robinson
Carolanne	Pippa Winslow	Shannon Cochran	Pippa Winslow	Shannon Cochran	Caroline Faber
Etheline Cotgrave	Jackie Morrison	Kate Fry	Jackie Morrison	Eva Kaminsky	Jo Castleton

Ronan Raftery was announced as Patrick Heusinger's replacement in the role of James for the play's West End premiere, while Heusinger reprised his role for the US Tour. However, Heusinger returned to the production shortly before the start of performances, opening the show with the rest of the original cast. Assistant director Travis A. Knight took over the role of James for the US tour starting at the Shakespeare Theater Company in Washington DC, and reprises the role for the Broadway production.

== Reception ==
Paranormal Activity has received mostly positive reviews. Many reviewers have praised the show's illusions and the sheer scare factor that cause audiences to jump and scream with genuine fright.

Charles McNulty of the Los Angeles Times called the play "truly scary" and potentially "the year's best staged production". McNulty described the audience as being genuinely frightened by the scenic, sound and illusion elements that worked together to "produce maximum terror." However, McNulty noted that the story's resolution is not fully satisfying and some plot points are overexplained.

Reviewing the show's West End production, Kate Wyver of The Guardian praised the show for treating horror as an art form rather than relying on cheap jump scares. She called the production truly frightening and highlighted Chris Fisher’s "eye-popping illusions", though she noted the dialogue was occasionally overly theatrical. Film critic Tim Robey for The Daily Telegraph was impressed with the transition from film to stage, describing the play as a "spook-a-thon mounted with devious technical finesse".

== Awards and nominations ==
Year	Award ceremony	Category	Result
2026	Laurence Olivier Award	Best Entertainment or Comedy Play	Nominated
