= List of awards and nominations received by Michael Shannon =

Michael Shannon awards and nominations
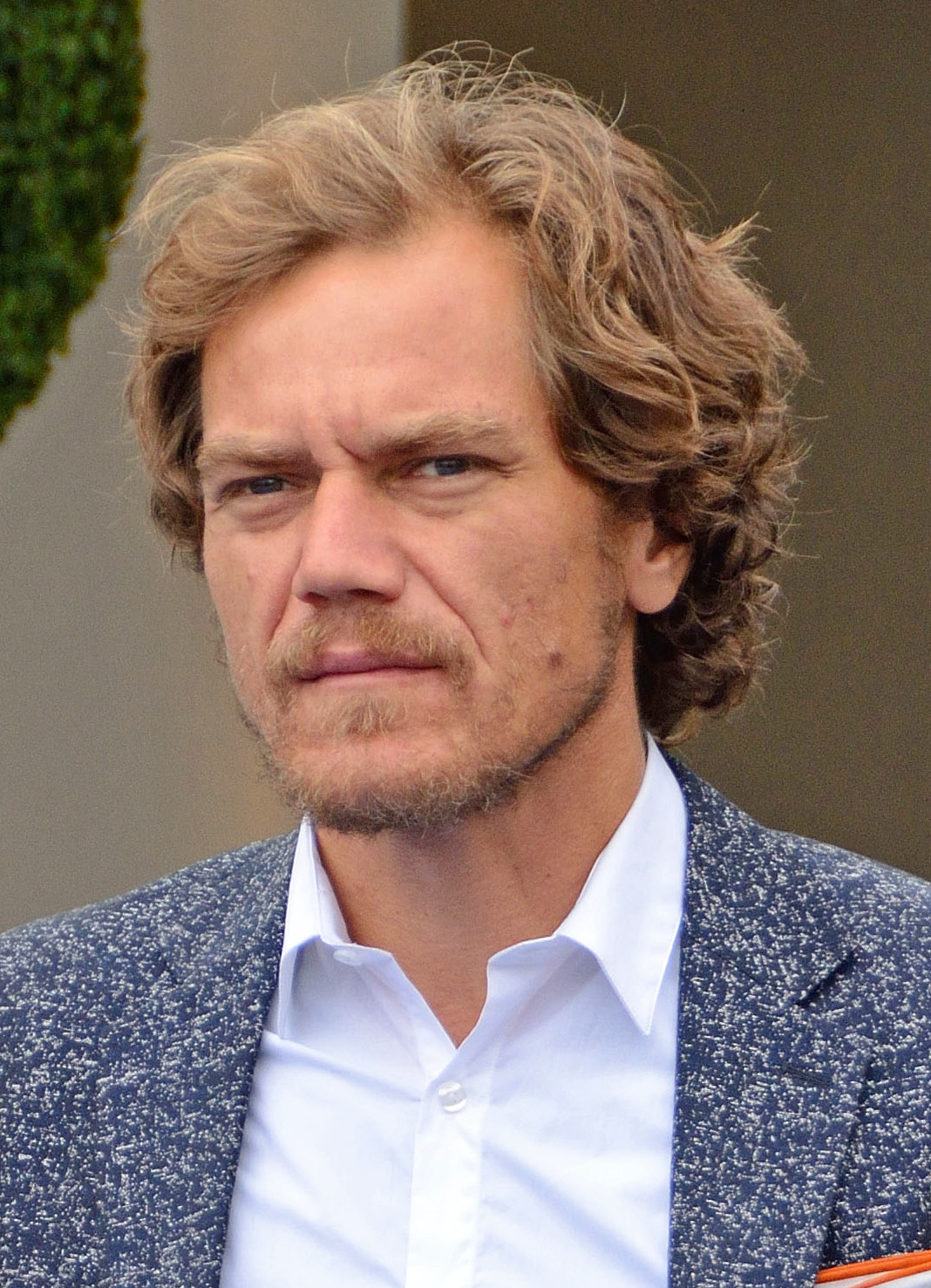
- Shannon in 2015
Awards and nominations
Award	Wins	Nominations
Academy Awards	0	2
Critics' Choice	0	2
Golden Globes	0	1
Emmy Awards	0	1
SAG Awards	2	4
Tony Awards	0	1

Totals (Note: Certain award groups do not simply award one winner. They acknowledge several different recipients, have runners-up, and have third place. Since this is a specific recognition and is different from losing an award, runner-up mentions are considered wins in this award tally. For simplification and to avoid errors, each award in this list has been presumed to have had a prior nomination.)
- Wins: 18
- Nominations: 79

The following is a list of awards and nominations received by Michael Shannon:

Michael Shannon is an American actor known for his roles on the stage and screen. He has received various accolades including two Screen Actors Guild Awards as well as nominations for two Academy Awards, a Golden Globe Award, a Primetime Emmy Award, and a Tony Award.

Shannon made his film debut in a minor role in the comedy Groundhog Day (1993) before taking supporting character actor roles in a string films including the Sidney Lumet crime thriller Before the Devil Knows You're Dead (2007) for which he won the Gotham Independent Film Award for Best Ensemble Cast along with the ensemble. He played a mentally ill man who speaks uncomfortable truths in the Sam Mendes period drama Revolutionary Road (2008) for which he earned a nomination for the Academy Award for Best Supporting Actor.

He played a working class man with paranoid schizophrenia in the Jeff Nichols independent drama Take Shelter (2011) for which he won various critics awards including the Chicago Film Critics Association Award for Best Actor. He portrayed a ruthless real estate broker in the Ramin Bahrani drama film 99 Homes (2015), earning the Los Angeles Film Critics Association Award as well as nominations for the Golden Globe Award, Critics' Choice Award, and Screen Actors Guild Award. He earned his second nomination for the Academy Award for Best Supporting Actor for his role as a West Texas detective investigating a brutal crime in the Tom Ford psychological thriller Nocturnal Animals (2016).

On television, he portrayed Nelson Van Alden in the HBO period crime drama Boardwalk Empire (2010–2014) for which he received two Screen Actors Guild Awards for Outstanding Ensemble in a Drama Series. He played Captain Beatty in the HBO film Fahrenheit 451 (2018) which was nominated for the Primetime Emmy Award for Outstanding Television Movie. He portrayed country singer George Jones in the Showtime limited series George & Tammy (2022) earning a Primetime Emmy Award for Outstanding Lead Actor in a Limited Series or Movie nomination.

On stage, he originated the role of a Gulf War veteran in the Tracy Letts play Bug and won the Obie Award with the ensemble in 2004. He was in Martin McDonagh's The Pillowman for which he was nominated for the Joseph Jefferson Award. On Broadway, he played James Tyrone Jr. in the 2016 revival of Eugene O'Neill's Long Day's Journey into Night for which he was nominated for the Tony Award for Best Featured Actor in a Play and won the Drama Desk Award and Outer Critics' Circle Award. He returned to Broadway playing a short order cook in a revival of the Terrence McNally play Frankie and Johnny in the Clair de Lune in 2020.

== Major associations ==
=== Academy Awards ===
Year	Category	Nominated work	Result	Ref.
2009	Best Supporting Actor	Revolutionary Road	Nominated	
2017	Best Supporting Actor	Nocturnal Animals	Nominated	

=== Critics' Choice Awards ===
Year	Category	Nominated work	Result	Ref.
Critics' Choice Movie Awards
2016	Best Supporting Actor	99 Homes	Nominated	
2017	Best Supporting Actor	Nocturnal Animals	Nominated	
Critics' Choice Television Awards
2026	Best Actor in a Movie/Miniseries	Death by Lightning	Nominated	

=== Emmy Awards ===
Year	Category	Nominated work	Result	Ref.
Primetime Emmy Awards
2024	Outstanding Lead Actor in a Limited Series or Movie	George & Tammy	Nominated	

=== Golden Globe Awards ===
Year	Category	Nominated work	Result	Ref.
2016	Best Supporting Actor – Motion Picture	99 Homes	Nominated	

=== Screen Actors Guild Awards ===
Year	Category	Nominated work	Result	Ref.
2011	Outstanding Ensemble in a Drama Series	Boardwalk Empire (season one)	Won	
2012	Outstanding Ensemble in a Drama Series	Boardwalk Empire (season two)	Won	
2013	Outstanding Ensemble in a Drama Series	Boardwalk Empire (season three)	Nominated	
2016	Outstanding Actor in a Supporting Role	99 Homes	Nominated	

=== Tony Awards ===
Year	Category	Nominated work	Result	Ref.
2016	Best Featured Actor in a Play	Long Day's Journey into Night	Nominated	

== Theatre awards ==
Year	Category	Award	Work	Result
1992	Joseph Jefferson Award	Actor in a Principal Role	Fun/Nobody	Won
2002	Joseph Jefferson Award	Actor in a Supporting Role	Bug	Nominated
2004	Lucille Lortel Award	Outstanding Lead Actor	Bug	Nominated
2006	Joseph Jefferson Award	Actor in a Supporting Role	The Pillowman	Nominated
2010	Lucille Lortel Award	Outstanding Lead Actor	Mistakes Were Made	Nominated
2010	Outer Critics Circle Award	Outstanding Solo Performance	Mistakes Were Made	Nominated
2010	Drama League Award	Distinguished Performance	Mistakes Were Made	Nominated
2010	Joseph Jefferson Award	Actor in a Principal Role	Mistakes Were Made	Nominated
2010	Drama Desk Award	Outstanding Actor in a Play	Mistakes Were Made	Nominated
2012	Joseph Jefferson Award	Actor in a Principal Role	Simpatico	Won
2016	Outer Critics Circle Award	Outstanding Featured Actor in a Play	Long Day's Journey Into Night	Won
2016	Drama Desk Award	Outstanding Featured Actor in a Play	Long Day's Journey Into Night	Won

== Miscellaneous awards ==
Year	Work	Award	Category	Result
2007	Gotham Award	Best Ensemble Cast	Before the Devil Knows You're Dead	Won
2008	Satellite Award	Best Supporting Actor	Revolutionary Road	Won
2008	Chicago Film Critics Association	Best Supporting Actor	Revolutionary Road	Nominated
2008	Detroit Film Critics Society	Best Supporting Actor	Revolutionary Road	Nominated
2008	St. Louis Film Critics Association	Best Supporting Actor	Revolutionary Road	Nominated
2009	Palm Springs International Film Festival	Best Ensemble Cast	Revolutionary Road	Won
2009	Online Film Critics Society	Best Supporting Actor	Revolutionary Road	Nominated
2009	Santa Barbara International Film Festival	Virtuoso Award	Revolutionary Road	Won
2011	Gotham Award	Best Ensemble Cast	Take Shelter	Nominated
2011	Austin Film Critics Association	Best Actor	Take Shelter	Won
2011	Chicago Film Critics Association	Best Actor	Take Shelter	Won
2011	New York Film Critics Online	Best Actor	Take Shelter	Won
2011	San Diego Film Critics Society	Best Actor	Take Shelter	Won
2011	Toronto Film Critics Association	Best Actor	Take Shelter	Won
2011	Los Angeles Film Critics Association	Best Actor	Take Shelter	Runner-up
2011	Dallas–Fort Worth Film Critics Association	Best Actor	Take Shelter	5th Place
2011	Detroit Film Critics Society	Best Actor	Take Shelter	Nominated
2011	Houston Film Critics Society	Best Actor	Take Shelter	Nominated
2011	Online Film Critics Society	Best Actor	Take Shelter	Nominated
2011	Satellite Award	Best Actor	Take Shelter	Nominated
2011	Washington D.C. Area Film Critics Association	Best Actor	Take Shelter	Nominated
2012	Vancouver Film Critics Circle	Best Actor	Take Shelter	Nominated
2012	Independent Spirit Award	Best Male Lead	Take Shelter	Nominated
2012	Saturn Award	Best Actor	Take Shelter	Won
2014	Independent Spirit Award	Robert Altman Award	Mud	Won
2015	Gotham Award	Best Actor	99 Homes	Nominated
2015	Los Angeles Film Critics Association	Best Supporting Actor	99 Homes	Won
2015	San Francisco Film Critics Circle	Best Supporting Actor	99 Homes	Won
2015	Toronto Film Critics Association	Best Supporting Actor	99 Homes	Runner-up
2015	Chicago Film Critics Association	Best Supporting Actor	99 Homes	Nominated
2015	Vancouver Film Critics Circle	Best Supporting Actor	99 Homes	Nominated
2015	Florida Film Critics Circle	Best Supporting Actor	99 Homes	Nominated
2015	Austin Film Critics Association	Best Supporting Actor	99 Homes	Nominated
2015	National Society of Film Critics	Best Supporting Actor	99 Homes	2nd Place
2015	Alliance of Women Film Journalists	Best Supporting Actor	99 Homes	Nominated
2015	Houston Film Critics Society	Best Supporting Actor	99 Homes	Nominated
2015	Independent Spirit Award	Best Supporting Male	99 Homes	Nominated
2015	Saturn Award	Best Supporting Actor	99 Homes	Nominated
2016	Washington D.C. Area Film Critics Association	Best Supporting Actor	Nocturnal Animals	Nominated
2016	St. Louis Film Critics Association	Best Supporting Actor	Nocturnal Animals	Nominated
2016	Toronto Film Critics Association	Best Supporting Actor	Nocturnal Animals	Runner-up
2016	Florida Film Critics Circle	Best Supporting Actor	Nocturnal Animals	Nominated
2016	San Francisco Film Critics Circle	Best Supporting Actor	Nocturnal Animals	Nominated
2016	Online Film Critics Society	Best Supporting Actor	Nocturnal Animals	Nominated
2016	Austin Film Critics Association	Best Supporting Actor	Nocturnal Animals	Nominated
2016	Chicago Film Critics Association	Best Supporting Actor	Nocturnal Animals	Nominated
2016	IndieWire Critics Poll	Best Supporting Actor	Nocturnal Animals	9th Place
2016	Alliance of Women Film Journalists	Best Supporting Actor	Nocturnal Animals	Nominated
2016	San Diego Film Critics Society	Best Supporting Actor	Nocturnal Animals	Nominated
2016	Dallas–Fort Worth Film Critics Association	Best Supporting Actor	Nocturnal Animals	3rd Place
2016	National Society of Film Critics	Best Supporting Actor	Nocturnal Animals	3rd Place
2016	Houston Film Critics Society	Best Supporting Actor	Nocturnal Animals	Nominated
2016	AACTA International Award	Best Supporting Actor	Nocturnal Animals	Nominated
2016	London Film Critics' Circle	Supporting Actor of the Year	Nocturnal Animals	Nominated
2017	St. Louis Film Critics Association	Best Supporting Actor	The Shape of Water	Nominated
2017	Seattle Film Critics Society	Best Supporting Actor	The Shape of Water	Nominated
2017	Satellite Awards	Best Supporting Actor	The Shape of Water	Nominated
2021	Satellite Awards	Best Supporting Actor – Series, Miniseries or Television Film	Nine Perfect Strangers	Nominated
2026	Gotham Award	Outstanding Lead Performance in a Limited or Anthology Series	Death by Lightning	Won
