= Odradek (disambiguation) =

Odradek is a creature in Franz Kafka's The Cares of a Family Man.

Odradek may also refer to:

- Odradek, Táboritská 8, Prague, 18 July 1994, a 1994 piece by Jeff Wall
- Odradek a 2009 album by Daniel Menche
- Odradek, a 2011 play by Brett Neveu
- The Sinking of the Odradek Stadium, a novel by Harry Mathews
- a device in the video game Death Stranding and its sequel
