= Eric Larue =

American drama film by Michael Shannon

Eric LaRue
- Theatrical release poster
- Directed by: Michael Shannon
- Screenplay by: Brett Neveu
- Based on: Eric Larue by Brett Neveu
- Produced by: Sarah Green; Karl Hartman; Jina Panebianco; Jeff Nichols
- Starring: Judy Greer; Paul Sparks; Alison Pill; Tracy Letts; Annie Parisse; Alexander Skarsgård
- Production companies: Big Cove Productions; Big Indie Pictures; CaliWood Pictures
- Distributed by: Magnolia Pictures
- Release dates: June 10, 2023 (Tribeca); April 4, 2025 (United States)
- Running time: 119 minutes
- Country: United States
- Language: English
- Budget: $3 million

Eric LaRue is a 2023 American independent drama film directed by Michael Shannon in his directorial debut. It was written by Brett Neveu, adapting his screenplay from his 2002 play of the same name.

== Synopsis ==
Janice, the mother of a high school murderer, prepares to visit her son in prison and to meet a collection of bereaved local parents.

== Cast ==
- Judy Greer as Janice LaRue
- Paul Sparks as Steve Calhan, a Presbyterian pastor
- Alison Pill as Lisa, a Human Resources manager close with Ron
- Tracy Letts as Bill Verne, motivational preacher
- Annie Parisse as Stephanie, a grieving mother
- Kate Arrington as Jill, a grieving mother
- Alexander Skarsgård as Ron LaRue, Janice's husband
- Nation Sage Henrikson as Eric LaRue, Janice's son and school shooter
- Lawrence Grimm as Jack, Janice's boss.

== Production ==
The play Eric Larue by Brett Neveu debuted in 2002 in Chicago at the A Red Orchid Theatre, whose founding members include Michael Shannon. Neveu wrote the play in response to the 1999 Columbine High School massacre. Shannon was directing a different Neveu play when a mass shooting occurred at the Marjory Stoneman Douglas High School in Parkland, Florida in February 2018, and a decision was made for Neveu to adapt his play Eric Larue for the screen. Shannon was announced as the director in July 2022. Shannon was quoted as saying "Eric Larue plays at the macro and a micro level simultaneously. When I read the screenplay, I immediately knew I had to direct it. I saw it. I heard it. I could feel it. And I wanted to make sure that it received just the right touch in all its aspects, because at the end of the day, it is an extraordinarily delicate thing." Executive production by Jeff Nichols and production by Sarah Green from Brace Cove Productions marks the seventh time they have worked together.

Production is also completed by Karl Hartman from Big Indie Pictures and Jina Panebianco from CaliWood Pictures, with executive producers also on board being R. Wesley Sierk III, Byron Wetzel, Meghan Schumacher, Joh D. Straley and Declan Baldwin.

=== Casting ===
In July 2022, Judy Greer, Paul Sparks, Alison Pill, Tracy Letts, Annie Parisse, Kate Arrington and Alexander Skarsgård were announced as the cast.

=== Filming ===
Filming was scheduled for August 8, 2022 to September 5, 2022 in Little Rock, Arkansas. However, citing an Arkansas state law which banned nearly all abortions in the state, including cases of rape and incest, as well as the Dobbs Supreme Court decision, it was announced that the production had withdrawn from the state and would instead be filming in and around Wilmington, North Carolina. Filming locations in Wilmington in August 2022 were thought to include Elderhaus, St. Andrews-Covenant Presbyterian Church and New River Pottery, amongst others. Filming was wrapped before the middle of September 2022.

== Release ==
Eric LaRue had its world premiere at the 2023 Tribeca Film Festival on June 10, 2023. It was released in the United States on April 4, 2025.

== Reception ==
On review aggregator Rotten Tomatoes, 69% of 42 critics gave the film a positive review, with an average rating of 6/10. On Metacritic, which uses a weighted average, the film holds a score of 61/100 based on 12 critics, indicating "generally favorable" reviews. The performances of the ensemble cast, and in particular Judy Greer playing against type, received praise by Lex Briscuso for TheWrap, David Rooney for the Hollywood Reporter, and Pete Hammond for Deadline Hollywood.
