= Sexual Harassment (The Office) =

- The Office episode
- Episode no.: Season 2 Episode 2
- Directed by: Ken Kwapis
- Written by: B. J. Novak
- Cinematography by: Randall Einhorn
- Editing by: David Rogers
- Production code: 2002
- Original air date: September 27, 2005
- Running time: 22 minutes

Guest appearances
- David Koechner as Todd Packer; Melora Hardin as Jan Levinson; David Denman as Roy Anderson; Leslie David Baker as Stanley Hudson; Brian Baumgartner as Kevin Malone; Kate Flannery as Meredith Palmer; Mindy Kaling as Kelly Kapoor; Angela Kinsey as Angela Martin; Paul Lieberstein as Toby Flenderson; Oscar Nunez as Oscar Martinez; Phyllis Smith as Phyllis Lapin; Shannon Cochran as Helene Beesly; Craig Robinson as Darryl Philbin

Episode chronology
← Previous "The Dundies"	Next → "Office Olympics"
- The Office (American TV series) season 2

"Sexual Harassment" is the second episode of the second season of the American comedy television series The Office and the show's eighth episode overall. The episode was written by B. J. Novak and directed by Ken Kwapis. The episode first aired in the United States on September 27, 2005, on NBC. "Sexual Harassment" saw the first on-screen appearance of recurring character Todd Packer (played by David Koechner) after first being heard through a phone call in the first episode.

The series depicts the everyday lives of office employees in the Scranton, Pennsylvania, branch of the fictional Dunder Mifflin Paper Company. In this episode, Michael Scott (Steve Carell) is concerned when he believes Dunder Mifflin is targeting him for sexual harassment training. Meanwhile, Pam Beesly (Jenna Fischer) anxiously awaits the arrival of her mother, and Michael's obnoxious friend Todd Packer spends the day in the office.

Novak was inspired to write the episode after attending an NBC sexual harassment seminar that the cast and crew had to attend before the series began. Many jokes and personal experiences involving sexual harassment were added into the script. This episode aired with a warning that it contained adult content and subject matter, which is rare for a network comedy. Novak explained that he had to fight NBC to get the word "boner" on the air. "Sexual Harassment" received moderately positive reviews from critics. The episode was viewed by 7.13 million viewers.

== Plot ==
Michael Scott's "best friend forever" Todd Packer offends the staff with crude gossip about an upper management scandal. Toby Flenderson informs Michael that he will conduct a review of the company's sexual harassment policies because the CFO resigned after allegations made by his secretary. Michael's indignation that this will put a damper on his easygoing office environment rises to outrage when he learns that the corporate headquarters is sending down a lawyer to talk to him. Michael and the warehouse staff mock the sexual harassment video, but the crude remarks come to a halt when Jan Levinson and the lawyer arrive from corporate.

While Michael angrily announces that he can no longer be friends with his staff and will never tell another joke again, Jim Halpert goads Michael into breaking his vow immediately, to the approval of Packer. Michael's attitude suddenly changes when he realizes that he is not in trouble, and that the lawyer's job is to protect him. After Packer tells a crude joke at the expense of Phyllis, Michael defends her, telling the entire office that he finds Phyllis attractive.

Meanwhile, Pam Beesly waits with anticipation for her mother to arrive from out of town. Pam's mother arrives and asks in whispers (shushed by an embarrassed Pam), "Which one is Jim?"

== Production ==
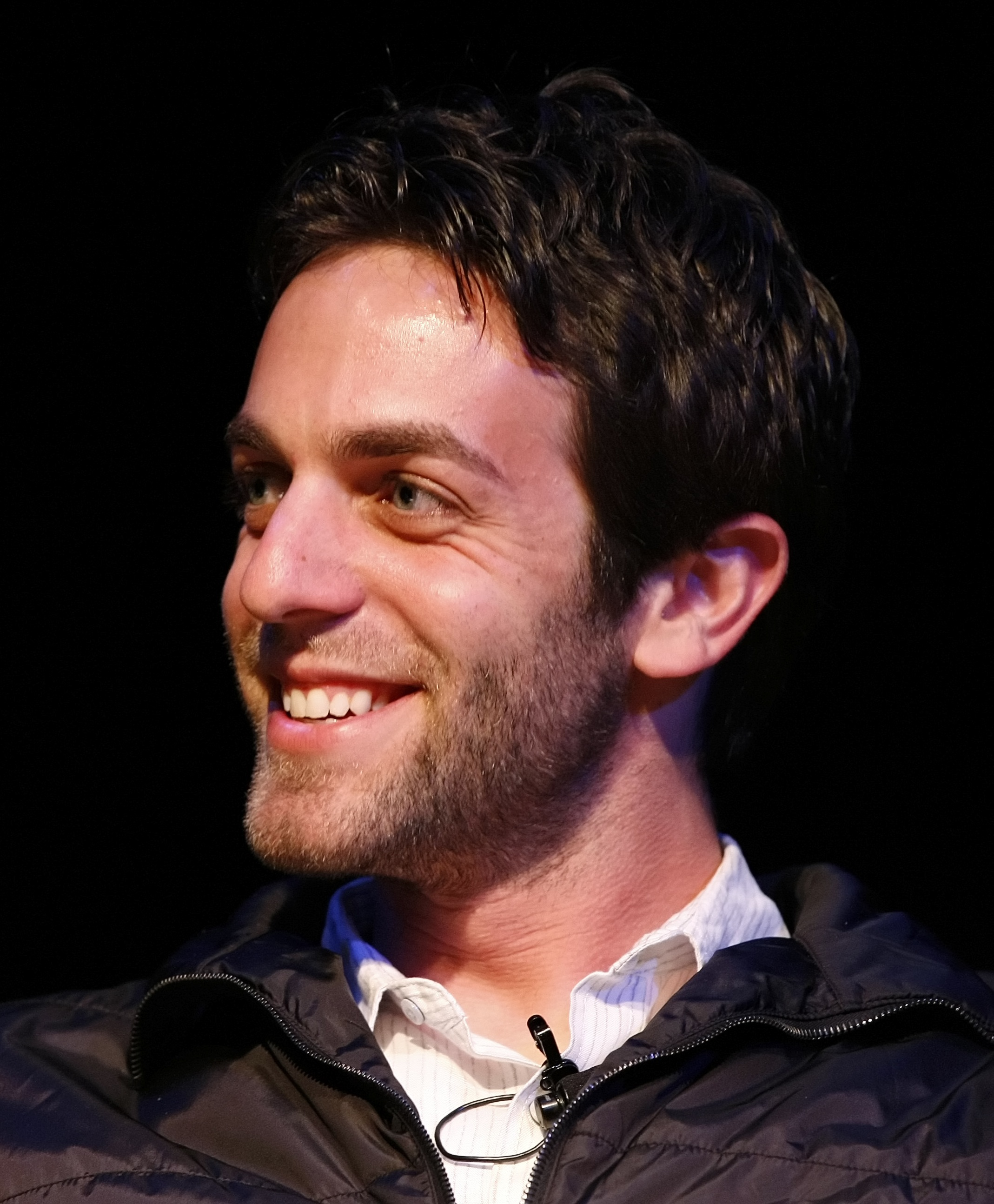
The episode's writer, B. J. Novak

"Sexual Harassment" was written by B. J. Novak, who also acts on the show as Ryan Howard. The episode was the third entry of the series directed by Ken Kwapis. Kwapis had previously directed "Pilot" and "Diversity Day". The inspiration for the episode was the NBC sexual harassment seminar that the cast and crew had to attend before the series began. Having worked in office environments prior to filming The Office, Jenna Fischer and Angela Kinsey both said that on the days of sexual harassment seminars, they would be harassed by their co-workers as a joke. This experience was added to the script for the episode. "Sexual Harassment" introduces Michael's catchphrase "That's what she said," which writer B. J. Novak says was something he heard repeated in college. The "What has two thumbs and X? This guy" joke also comes from Novak's college days. A good majority of Dwight's exchange with Toby about female anatomy was improvised.

When it came time to cast Todd Packer, the crew's first choice was David Koechner, who had starred alongside Carell in the hit 2004 comedy movie Anchorman: The Legend of Ron Burgundy. Production for the episode had to be delayed so that Koechner could be secured for the part. Novak commented that Koechner was one of the few actors who was "talented enough to make Steve Carell break up on set", a feat that he said was "worth" the delays.

When deciding what car Packer would own, writer B. J. Novak wanted to use a Ford Mustang, but none were available. Producer Kent Zbornak decided to get Packer a red Chevrolet Corvette, which Novak admitted was "even better". This episode aired with a warning that it contains adult content and subject matter, which is rare for a network comedy. Though there was no opposition to the episode's use of the word "clitoris", Novak had to fight NBC to get the word "boner" on the air because the replacement—"schwing"—did not have, according to Novak, "the same redemption for Michael at the end." The disclaimer was a compromise. A station in Kentucky nevertheless refused to air this episode. An exceptionally large number of scenes were cut from the finished episode, only a few of which were included on the DVD release. Cut scenes included Dwight running into the break room and excitedly shouting "William Hung is here!" after seeing Packer's license plate, most of Dwight's questioning Toby about female anatomy, and Packer humping the glass behind Jan during her meeting with Michael.

Pam's mother was played by Shannon Cochran in this episode of the series, the first appearance of the character on the show. Cochran was unable to return to play the character for the season six episode "Niagara", due to scheduling conflicts with a year-long theater contract, and was thus replaced by Linda Purl.

== Cultural references ==
Michael forwards Jim a joke chain-email entitled "Fifty Signs Your Priest Might Be Michael Jackson". Michael later compares the members of the office to the cast of Friends, saying that he is both Chandler Bing and Joey Tribbiani and Pam is Rachel Green. He claims that Dwight is Cosmo Kramer, failing to realize that he is a character in the sitcom Seinfeld and not Friends. Todd Packer's license plate reads "WLHUNG", a reference to a large penis, but Ryan interprets it to mean he is a fan of singer William Hung. Darryl asks whether Michael got his pants at "Queers R Us", a reference to Toys R Us. The episode is the first to feature what would become Michael's catchphrase: "That's what she said."

== Reception ==
"Sexual Harassment" originally aired on NBC in the United States on September 27, 2005. The episode was viewed by 7.13 million viewers. The episode ranked as the sixty-third most-watched episode of television for the week it aired. An encore presentation of the episode, on May 31, 2006, received 2.2 rating/6% share and retained 100% of its lead-in viewership from My Name Is Earl among 18- to 49-year-olds. The encore presentation was viewed by over 4.5 million viewers.

"Sexual Harassment" received moderately positive reviews from critics. Michael Sciannamea of TV Squad wrote that the episode "was OK, nothing great." Sciannamea went on to explain that the "subject was funny, but I thought the writers were trying too hard to push the envelope", making the episode "uneven". "Miss Alli" of Television Without Pity gave the episode a "B+" grade. Erik Adams of The A.V. Club awarded the episode a "B−" and called it "a slightly above average episode", but that its greatest success was an ability to reach "some of its greatest heights on a moment-by-moment basis", similar in style to vignettes. Adams was slightly critical of the main plot, noting that the show had "difficulty maintaining the comedic momentum", but he reasoned that this was probably largely due to "Michael-on-defense" being a "difficult character to write", because "there aren’t many good ways of displaying his humanity while he’s also fighting for the right to be an asshole."

TV Fanatic reviewed several quotes from "Sexual Harassment", and rated several of Todd Packer's lewd jokes, as well as Michael's "You wouldn't arrest a guy who was just passing drugs from one guy to another" monologue 5 out of 5. Entertainment Weekly named Michael Scott's line, "Toby is in HR, which technically means he works for corporate. So he's really not a part of our family. Also, he's divorced, so he's really not a part of his family," one of "TV's funniest lines" for the week ending October 3, 2005. Dan Phillips from IGN named "Michael's Boner" the tenth most awkward moment of the show, noting that, "The camera holds the others' reactions just long enough to drive home the awkwardness of the scene, making you want to crawl inside of a hole along with the rest of the cast."
