= Simpatico (play) =

1994 play by Sam Shepard

- Original language: English
- Written by: Sam Shepard
- Genre: Drama

Premiere
- Date: 14 November 1994

Simpatico is a play by American playwright Sam Shepard. It opened at the Joseph Papp Public Theater in New York on the night of 14 November 1994. It starred Ed Harris, Fred Ward, Beverly D'Angelo, James Gammon and Marcia Gay Harden.

In 1999, it was adapted for the screen in the film Simpatico starring Nick Nolte, Jeff Bridges, Sharon Stone, Catherine Keener, and Albert Finney.

In the Fall of 2017, following the death of Sam Shepard that July, Simpatico was presented at the McCarter Theatre in Princeton, New Jersey by A Red Orchid Theatre of Chicago, and directed by Dado. The cast was Michael Shannon, Guy Van Swearingen, Mierka Girten, John Judd, Kristen E. Ellis and Jennifer Engstrom.

Shepard claimed that he wrote the first act of Simpatico on the steering wheel of a truck, while driving on the highway.

== Plot ==
As youths in Azusa, California, Vinnie, Carter, and Rosie pull off a racing scam, substituting winners for plodders and winning big bucks on long odds. When an official uncovers the scam, they set him up for blackmail.

The story jumps ahead for twenty years, when Carter and Rosie are married, successful racers in Kentucky, who are about to sell their prize stallion, Simpatico. Vinnie is a drunk in Pomona. He decides to make a play for Rosie, and lures Carter to California, where he steals his wallet and heads for Kentucky with the original blackmail material. Carter begs Vinnie's friend, a grocery clerk named Cecilia, to follow Vinnie and get the material back.
