= Brett Neveu =

American dramatist

Brett Neveu is an American playwright, and ensemble member at A Red Orchid Theatre in Chicago.

== Work ==
Theatre productions include Traitor with A Red Orchid Theatre (Chicago), To Catch a Fish with Timeline Theatre (Chicago) and Her America with The Greenhouse Theatre (Chicago). Film/TV productions include Night's End with AMC/Shudder, the short Convo with Breakwall Pictures and the feature The Earl with Intermission Productions. Past work includes productions with 59e59 Theatre in New York; The Royal Court Theatre and The Royal Shakespeare Company in London; The Goodman Theatre, Writers Theatre, The House Theatre, The Inconvenience, TimeLine Theatre Company, A Red Orchid Theatre and American Theatre Company in Chicago.

A Sundance Institute Ucross Fellow, Brett is also a recipient of the Marquee Award from Chicago Dramatists, the Ofner Prize for New Work, the Emerging Artist Award from The League of Chicago Theatres, an After Dark Award for Outstanding Musical (Old Town).

He is a resident-alum of Chicago Dramatists, an ensemble member of A Red Orchid Theatre, a founding member of the playwright collective MC-10, and an alumni member of TimeLine Theatre Company's Writers Collective and Center Theatre Group's Playwrights’ Workshop in Los Angeles.

Brett has taught writing at DePaul University, Second City Training Center and currently teaches writing for the screen and stage at Northwestern University. He adapted his play Eric Larue into a screenplay to be directed as a feature film by A Red Orchid Theatre founding member Michael Shannon.

== Reviews ==
Traitor, 2018

The Meek, 2007

"Hero Villain Casts a Spell Without a Villain"

"Detective Partner Hero Villain""

== Publication ==
- Harmless: Part I of Trilogy '04, 05' '06 (2016)
- Weapon of Mass Impact: Part II of Trilogy '04, '05, '06 (2016)
- Old Glory: Part III of Trilogy '04, '05, '06 (2016)
- Drawing War (2007)
- Eagle Hills, Eagle Ridge, Eagle Landing (2007)
- The Last Barbecue (2007)
- Megacosm

all by Broadway Play Publishing Inc.

- The Opponent
- Detective Partner Hero Villain
- American Dead
- Eric Larue

all by Dramatic Publishing

- Redbud

by Nick Hern Publishing
