= Ava Pickett =

British screenwriter and playwright

- Born: 1993 or 1994 (age 32–33)
- Education: Middlesex University; Royal Central School of Speech and Drama
- Occupation: Screenwriter • playwright
- Notable work: 1536
- Awards: Susan Smith Blackburn Prize

Ava Pickett (born 1993 or 1994) is an English screenwriter and playwright. Her debut play 1536 won the 2023–24 Susan Smith Blackburn Prize. She was a staff writer on The Great and she co-wrote Baz Luhrmann's upcoming film Jehanne d’Arc.

== Early life and education ==
Ava Pickett is from Colchester, Essex. She graduated with a Bachelor of Arts (BA) in theatre from Middlesex University. She went on to complete a Master of Arts (MA) at the Royal Central School of Speech and Drama in 2018. Originally aspiring to be an actor, Pickett started writing when she moved back from London to Clacton-on-Sea after struggling to find work.

== Career ==
=== Theatre ===
As a member of the 2021–22 Genesis Almeida New Playwrights, Big Plays Programme cohort, Pickett wrote 1536, a play following three peasant women friends in lead up to Anne Boleyn's execution. 1536 ran from 6 May – 7 June 2025 at the Almeida Theatre, directed by Lyndsey Turner and starring Liv Hill, Siena Kelly and Tanya Reynolds.

Pickett won the 2023–24 Susan Smith Blackburn Prize for 1536, the play being praised by the judges for its "sparkling dialogue and thrilling, charismatic writing underpinned by great craft and restraint". Pickett also received a special mention for the 2023 George Devine Award.

Pickett wrote a contemporary stage adaptation of Emma by Jane Austen, directed by Christopher Haydon. The show ran from 17 September – 11 October 2025 at the Rose Theatre Kingston, starring Amelia Kenworthy and Kit Young. Pickett's stage adaptation of The Manningtree Witches by A. K. Blakemore is set to run from 28 February – 14 March 2026 at the Mercury Theatre in her hometown Colchester, directed by Natasha Rickman. Pickett was the resident playwright at the Mercury Theatre in 2020.

=== Television ===
As a staff writer on season 3 of The Great, Pickett was credited on episodes "Sweden" and "Three Pieces" alongside series creator, Tony McNamara. She has also written for Ten Pound Poms, Bad Education, Brassic, The Buccaneers, and How to Get to Heaven from Belfast.

=== Film ===
Pickett co-wrote the upcoming film Jehanne d’Arc with writer-director Baz Luhrmann. The script was inspired by Blood Red, Sister Rose by Thomas Keneally, a novel about Joan of Arc. While writing the script, Pickett and Luhrmann travelled to Domrémy-la-Pucelle, Rouen, Kettering and the Royal Armouries Museum for research. Luhrmann said of Pickett: "I feel a kindred spirit with Ava. To put it in medieval terms, I feel we were both born to jest and forced to joust."

=== Radio ===
Pickett wrote the comedy radio programme Roots, which was first broadcast on BBC Radio 4 in 2020 and was a Comedy of the Week.
