= Domino Day (British TV series) =

2024 British television series

- Genre: Fantasy; Supernatural fiction
- Created by: Lauren Sequeira
- Directed by: Eva Sigurdardottir; Nadira Amrani
- Starring: Siena Kelly; Percelle Ascott
- Composers: Tawiah; Lindsay Wright
- Country of origin: United Kingdom
- Original language: English
- No. of seasons: 1
- No. of episodes: 6

Production
- Executive producers: Laurence Bowen; Ayela Butt; Chris Carey; Elinor Day; Lucy Richer; Lauren Sequeira
- Producer: Nick Pitt
- Production locations: Manchester, England
- Cinematography: Philippe Kress; Andrew McDonnell
- Editor: Anil Griffin
- Running time: 42 Minutes
- Production company: Dancing Ledge Productions

Original release
- Network: BBC Three
- Release: 31 January – 28 February 2024

Domino Day is a British fantasy television series created by Lauren Sequeira and developed by Dancing Ledge Productions for BBC Three.

== Cast and characters ==
- Siena Kelly as Domino Day
- Percelle Ascott as Leon
- Sam Howard Sneyd as Silas
- Babirye Bukilwa as Sammie
- Poppy Lee Friar as Geri
- Maimuna Memon as Verdita
- Christopher Jeffers as Mike
- Jonah Rzeskiewicz as Jason
- Alisha Bailey as Kat
- Molly Harris as Jules
- Lucy Cohu as Esme

== Production ==
In March 2021, the BBC commissioned Domino Day, a six-part series from new writer Lauren Sequeira. Sequeira had been a Writer in Residence at the company Dancing Ledge Productions. Joining Sequeira in the writers' room were Charlene James and Haleema Mirza, with Eva Sigurdardottir and Nadira Amrani attached to direct.

In March 2023, it was announced Siena Kelly would lead the series as the titular character Domino. Also joining the cast were Babirye Bukilwa, Poppy Lee Friar, Alisha Bailey, Molly Harris, Sam Howard-Sneyd, Percelle Ascott, Christopher Jeffers, Jonah Rzeskiewicz, Maimuna Memon, and Kris Hitchen.

Principal photography took place in and around Manchester.

== Episodes ==
No.	Title	Directed by	Written by	Original release date	UK viewers (millions)
1	"Episode 1"	Eva Sigurdardottir	Lauren Sequeira	31 January 2024	N/A
2	"Episode 2"	Eva Sigurdardottir	Lauren Sequeira	TBA	TBD
3	"Episode 3"	Eva Sigurdardottir	Lauren Sequeira	TBA	TBD
4	"Episode 4"	Nadira Amrani	Charlene James	TBA	TBD
5	"Episode 5"	Nadira Amrani	Haleema Mirza	TBA	TBD
6	"Episode 6"	Nadira Amrani	Lauren Sequeira	TBA	TBD

== Reception ==
Lucy Mangan of The Guardian awarded the first episode four stars out of five, remarking "It dances along lots of tightropes without falling off. It is incredibly stylish without being self-conscious and it has energy to burn without becoming frenetic." Michael Hogan in The Telegraph also gave it four out of five stars.
