= Noëmi Nadelmann =

Swiss singer (born 1962)

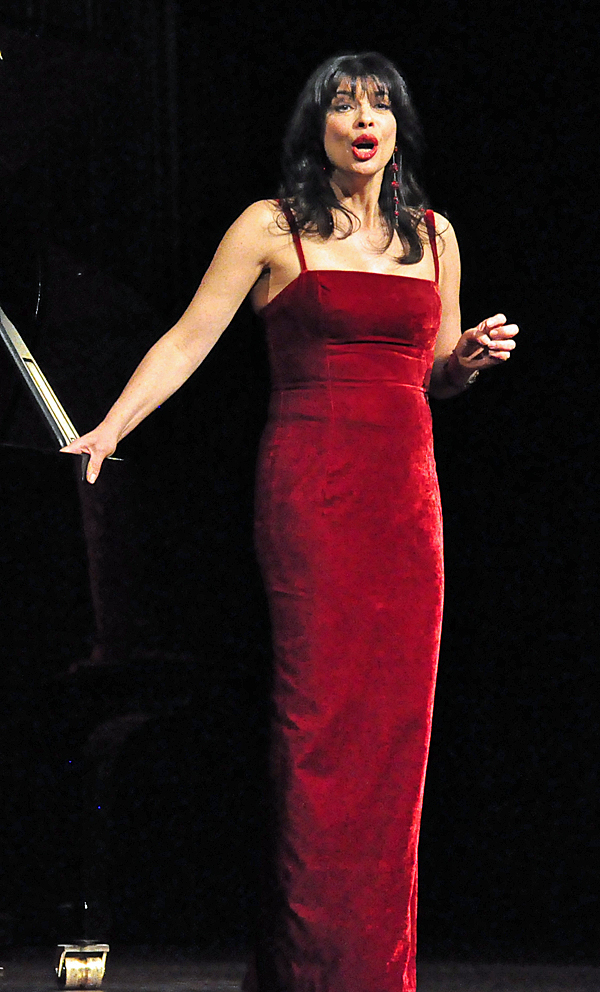
Noëmi Nadelmann, 2009

Noëmi Nadelmann (born 6 March 1962) is a Swiss soprano with a wide repertoire, ranging from Baroque opera to contemporary works.

== Career ==
Nadelmann was born in Zürich; her mother, Rachel, was an actress, her father, Leo (1913–1998), a pianist and composer. Nadelmann started her singing studies at the Zürich Conservatory, then continued at Indiana University Bloomington. She debuted in 1987 as Musetta in La bohème at La Fenice in Venice.

Engagements at the Vienna Volksoper and various Swiss cities followed. From 1990 until 1994 she was a member of the Staatstheater am Gärtnerplatz in Munich. Subsequent freelance appearances include the Komische Oper Berlin, Zürich Opera House, Bern Theatre, Opéra Bastille in Paris, Hamburg State Opera, Prinzregententheater in Munich, Deutsche Oper Berlin, the Metropolitan Opera in New York, Lyric Opera of Chicago, Cologne Opera, Berlin State Opera, De Nederlandse Opera, and the Bolshoi Theatre.

She appeared repeatedly at the Solothurn Classics festival in Switzerland. Her festival performances included Pamina in Mozart's Die Zauberflöte and Donna Anna in Don Giovanni in 2008, Rosalinde in Johann Strauss II's Die Fledermaus in 2009, and the soprano solo part in Verdi's Messa da Requiem in 2013, conducted by Nayden Todorov. She also appeared in the festival's 2013 soloists' concert, part of that year's Verdi-focused edition.

In Andrzej Żuławskis 1991 film La Note bleue Nadelmann plays the role of the opera singer Pauline Viardot. She sang Violetta in Götz Friedrich's televised production of La traviata.

She received the Critics' Prize in Berlin in 1996 and the Wolfgang-Amadeus-Mozart-Preis in 1996.

In 2010, Nadelmann entered a competition, Battle of the Choirs, on the Swiss television station SRF with the group she founded, Noëmi Nadelmann und Chor. Nadelmann and the group have then continued to perform concerts.

In January 2014, she announced that she and Lyndon Terracini had resumed a relationship that was interrupted 23 years before and that she would move to Australia. She did, and they married in 2019.

== Discography ==
- Nadelmann singt Gershwin und Porter, 1999
- Opern-Arien, 1999/2000
- Arte Nova Voices – Franz Schreker (Lieder), with Andreas Schmidt (baritone), 2000
- Komm mit mir ins Chambre Séparée, 2006
- Zarzuela: Spanish Arias, 2006
- Mein blaues Klavier – Schweizer Lieder, 2010, song cycles by Leo Nadelmann, Ernest Bloch, Friedrich Hegar, Rolf Urs Ringger and Willy Burkhard
