= Night's End =

- Directed by: Jennifer Reeder
- Screenplay by: Brett Neveu
- Starring: Geno Walker
- Distributed by: Shudder
- Release date: March 31, 2022
- Running time: 82 minutes
- Country: United States
- Language: English

Night's End is a 2022 American horror film written by Brett Neveu, directed by Jennifer Reeder and starring Geno Walker.

== Plot ==
A divorced and out of work man encounters a demonic force. During an exorcism, he unleashes a plague of evil upon the earth, unwittingly and via manipulation.

== Cast ==
- Geno Walker as Ken Barber
- Kate Arrington as Kelsey Dees
- Felonious Munk as Terry Gilson
- Michael Shannon as Isaac Dees
- Lawrence Grimm as Colin Albertson
- Daniel Kyri as Dark Corners
- Theo Germaine as Lyden Knight
- Morgan Reesh as Roberta Wellwood

== Release ==
The film premiered on Shudder on March 31, 2022.

== Reception ==
On the review aggregator website Rotten Tomatoes, 48% of 27 critics' reviews are positive. The website's consensus reads: "Flashes of suspense hint at the horror movie it might have been, but Night's End is ultimately too dull and repetitious to recommend." On Metacritic, the film has a weighted average score of 49 out of 100 based on 6 critics, which the site labels as "mixed or average" reviews. Peter Sobczynski of RogerEbert.com awarded the film two stars. Jude Dry of IndieWire graded the film a B−.

Noel Murray of the Los Angeles Times gave the film a mixed review and wrote, "Night's End takes a bit too long to build up momentum. However, Neveu’s plot really comes together in the final 20 minutes..."

Cassandra Clarke of Comic Book Resources gave the film a negative review and wrote, "Night's End brings a lot of intriguing ideas to the surface around the strange powers of isolation but it ultimately doesn't stick its landing."

Matt Donato of IGN gave the film a positive review and wrote, "At its worst, Night's End exists as an easily digestible if less filling menu option for horror fans. Geno Walker delivers a strong-enough leading performance..."

Shelagh Rowan-Legg of Screen Anarchy gave the film a negative review and wrote, "Night's End is the kind of intimate horror that, arguably, could only be made since we have had a better understanding of what it means to be physically isolated and technically connected at the same time."

Martin Unsworth of Starburst also gave the film a negative review and wrote, "There’s an interesting concept in Brett Neveu’s script, but it would have likely worked better as a longer short than a feature."
