= Lyndon Terracini =

Australian opera singer and artistic director

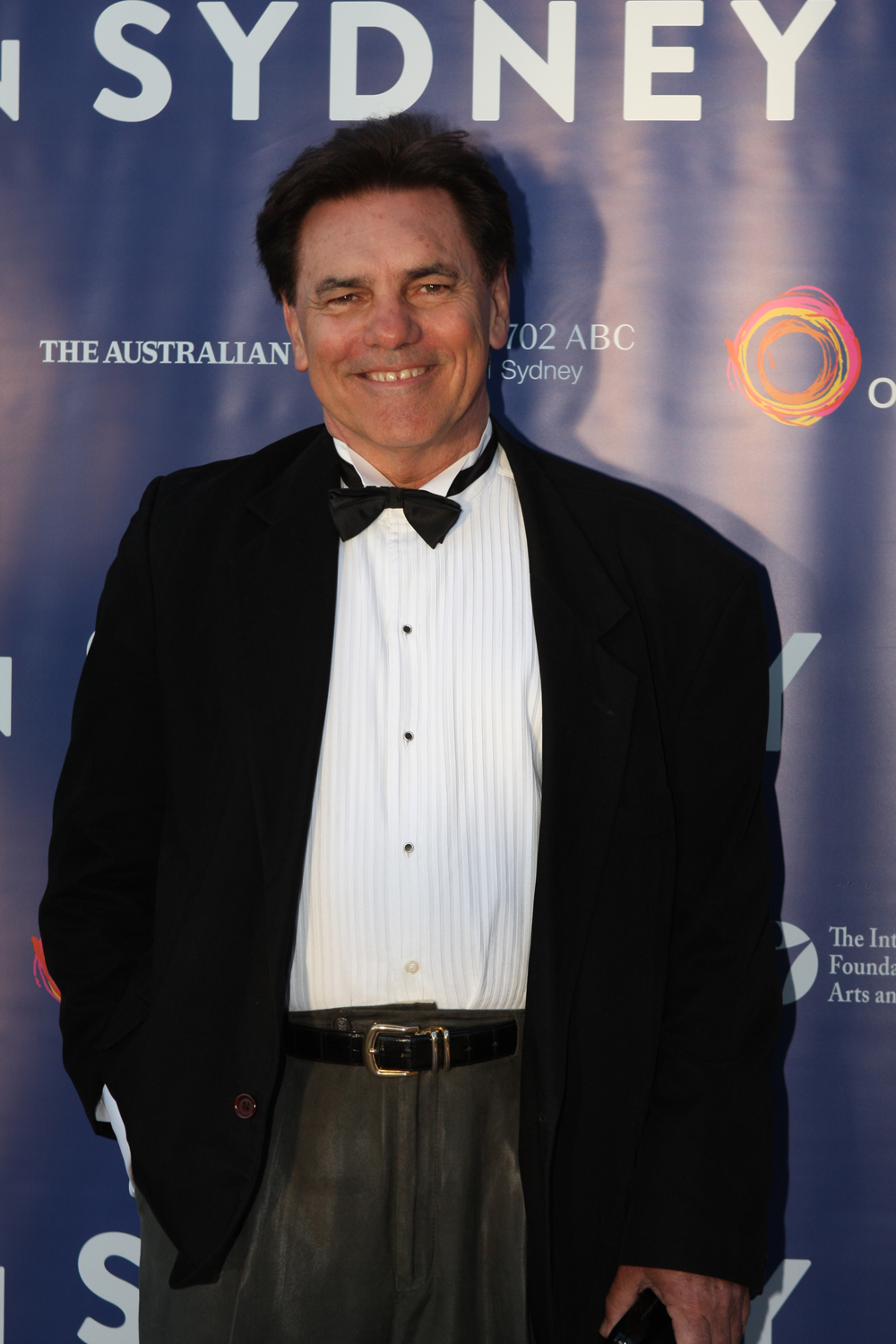
Lyndon Terracini, 2012

Lyndon William Terracini AM OSI (born 1950), is an Australian operatic baritone and from 2009 to October 2022 artistic director of Opera Australia.

== Early life ==
Terracini was born in 1949, the oldest of four children born to Shirley and Vita Terracini, and grew up in Dee Why, New South Wales. His paternal grandfather, the son of an immigrant from Genoa, converted to Christianity from Judaism and joined the Salvation Army. He grew up in a devout Salvationist family and played multiple instruments in the Salvation Army band, including cornet, flugelhorn, trombone, euphonium and timpani. He later studied music at the University of Sydney.

== Career ==
Terracini's professional operatic debut was in 1976 as Sid in The Australian Opera's production of Albert Herring at the Sydney Opera House. The same year, he sang in the Australian premier of Hans Werner Henze's El Cimarrón, conducted by the composer at the Adelaide Festival. Henze and Terracini later collaborated on several projects in Italy, where Terracini lived for much of the 1980s.

Terracini eventually moved back to Australia and settled in Lismore, New South Wales. In 1993, he was the founding artistic director of the Northern Rivers Performing Arts (NORPA). He was later artistic director of the Queensland Music Festival in 2000 and the Brisbane Festival from 2006 until 2009.

Terracini wrote the screenplay for the 2004 film The Widower, for which he also performed the vocals, earning a 2005 AFI Awards nomination for Best Adapted Screenplay.

In 2009, Terracini was headhunted to join Opera Australia as artistic director. He initially concentrated on "reliable crowd-pleasers such as La bohème and The Magic Flute" to rebuild the organisation's finances after the 2008 financial crisis. He later diversified Opera Australia's offerings with "opera on TV, digital opera with LED screens, and opera on the beach and the harbour". In 2012 he launched an ongoing series of outdoor summer operas on Sydney Harbour, sponsored by Haruhisa Handa. Terracini has received some criticism from the local industry for his use of foreign performers. In 2019 the organisation's board extended his contract to 2023. In October 2022 he announced his resignation from Opera Australia at the end of his term, and then announced he would be leaving immediately, after multiple allegations of bullying at the company during his tenure.

Terracini, who owns a property in the area, announced in 2024 that the inaugural Handa Opera at Millthorpe festival will be held in 2025.

== Personal life ==
Terracini had two daughters, including the actress Catherine Terracini from a previous marriage, who were born in Palanzo near Lake Como. In January 2014, Swiss soprano Noëmi Nadelmann announced that she and Terracini had resumed a relationship that was interrupted 23 years before and that she would move to Australia. She did, and they married in 2019. Criminal defence barrister Winston Terracini SC and conductor Paul Terracini are his brothers.

In the 2014 Queen's Birthday Honours List, Terracini was appointed as a Member of the Order of Australia (AM), "for significant service to the performing arts as an opera performer, director and administrator." In 2018 he was appointed Commander of the Order of the Star of Italy by the Italian government.
