= Levi Holloway =

American playwright

- Born: Middleburg, Florida
- Education: DePaul University (BFA)

Levi Holloway is an American playwright, actor, and educator, known for his work on Broadway, including Grey House in 2023 and Paranormal Activity in 2026.

== Early life ==
Holloway grew up in Middleburg, Florida and was introduced to horror by his father. He attended Douglas Anderson School of the Arts in theater, before attending The Theatre School at DePaul University, receiving his Bachelor of Fine Arts in acting.

== Career ==
Holloway is an ensemble member with A Red Orchid Theatre in Chicago, Illinois and is most notable for his plays involving the thriller genre, such as Grey House and Paranormal Activity. The former premiered at A Red Orchid Theatre in 2019 before debuting on Broadway in 2023 starring Laurie Metcalf, Paul Sparks and Tatiana Maslany, directed by Joe Mantello. The latter premiered in London to critical acclaim, and is set to debut on Broadway in 2026 at the August Wilson Theatre for a 20-week run.

His play Turret premiered at A Red Orchid Theatre in 2024, running from May 2-June 9, 2024, starring Michael Shannon. The production received mixed reviews, with New City Stage writing that the show had "interesting ideas and motifs" but that they were "buried in a show that’s more intent on startling and overwhelming the audience than on communicating with it."

He is the co-founder of the Neverbird Project, a youth based deaf and hard of hearing theatre company. He specializes in working with deaf children and creating theatre for Deaf people. He was an elementary school teacher in Chicago in the deaf department at Bell Elementary for over a decade. He is a repertory member of A Red Orchid Theatre in Chicago, and also performed as an actor in productions with Lookingglass Theatre Company and Steppenwolf.

== Personal life ==
Holloway is based in Chicago, Illinois.

== Plays ==
- Pinocchio (adaptation)
- The Haven Place
- Grey House
- Turret
- Paranormal Activity
