= Trinity Catholic College, Lismore =

Trinity Catholic College Lismore

Location
- R Block, Southern Cross University, Military Rd, Lismore, New South Wales; Australia; 28°48′57″S 153°18′00″E

Information
- Former names: St Mary's College for Girls; St Joseph's High School for Boys
- Type: Independent co-educational secondary day school
- Motto: In Word and Deed
- Denomination: Roman Catholicism
- Founded: 1886; 140 years ago (St. Mary's College for Girls); 1911; 115 years ago (St. Joseph's High School for Boys); 1985; 41 years ago (Trinity Catholic College, Lismore)
- Founder: Presentation Sisters (St. Mary's College for Girls); Marist Brothers (St. Joseph's High School for Boys)
- Oversight: Catholic Schools Office, Diocese of Lismore
- Principal: Jesse Smith
- Years: 7–12
- Enrolment: c. 1,450
- Campus type: Regional
- Colours: Blue and gold
- Newspaper: Trinity Lantern
- Yearbook: The Trinitarian
- Affiliations: Marist Brothers, the Presentation Sisters and St Carthage's Cathedral Parish
- Website: www.trinitylismore.nsw.edu.au

Trinity Catholic College is an independent Roman Catholic co-educational secondary day school, located over two adjacent campuses in the Northern Rivers region, on the northern fringe of Lismore, New South Wales, Australia.

== History ==
St Mary's College for Girls was founded by the Presentation Sisters in 1886, as a single-sex boarding school, and was merged with the Marist Brothers boys school in 1985 to create Trinity Catholic College.

Brother Peter Pemble, a former principal of the College between 2001 and 2007, was sentenced in 2015 for child sexual abuse crimes against a boy that occurred in the 1970s while Pemble was a teacher at Marist Brothers High School, Maitland. After pleading guilty, Pemble was given a custodial sentence of 18 months, with a non-parole period of nine months.

In 2017, College Principal, Brother John Hilet, reported to the media that he felt privileged when two FTM transgender students confided in him that they were experiencing gender identity issues and sought to be identified as males.

On the 6 April 2022, it was announced that Jesse Smith would be appointed the role of College Principal following the conclusion of Brother John Hilet's tenure, having been acting principal since late 2021. He is the first lay principal to be appointed at the college.

The college campus was significantly damaged in the 2022 eastern Australia flood. The school was given a three-year lease to operate at the Lismore campus of Southern Cross University, with a decision to permanently relocate the school confirmed.

== Notable alumni ==
- Simon Baker, actor
- Katherine Hicks, actress
- Maia Mitchell, actress/singer
- Luke Scott, rugby league player
- Catherine Terracini, actress

== See also ==
- List of Catholic schools in New South Wales
- Catholic education in Australia
