= Namir Smallwood =

American actor

- Occupation: Actor
- Years active: 2017–present

Namir Smallwood is an American stage & film actor. He is best known as a member of the Steppenwolf Theatre Company in Chicago, Illinois.

== Early life ==
Smallwood grew up in Newark, New Jersey, and has been pursuing acting seriously since the age of 14.

== Career ==
In 2017, Smallwood joined the Steppenwolf Theatre Company. In 2019 he was one of the leads in the company's first revival of True West. In 2020, he was a lead in the company's production of Bug. Both performances earned him nominations for a Jeff Award for Outstanding Performer in a Principal Role in a Play. Smallwood reprised his role in Bug for the play's 2025 Broadway premiere.

In 2022, he had his film debut in Rounding.

== Filmography ==
Year	Name	Role	Notes
2012	Chicago Fire	James	Episode: "Merry Christmas, Etc."
2019	Live from Lincoln Center	Omari	Episode: "Pipeline"
2019	Elementary	Jarius	Episode: "Red Light, Green Light"
2021–2024	American Rust	Frank Deluca	10 episodes
2022	Rounding	Dr. James Hayman	
2023	Power Book IV: Force	Jamal Franklin	3 episodes

== Stage ==
Year	Title	Role	Venue	Ref.
2019	True West	Lee	Regional, Steppenwolf Theatre Company	
2020	Bug	Peter Evans	Regional, Steppenwolf Theatre Company	
2021	Pass Over	Kitch	Broadway, August Wilson Theatre	
2025	The Book of Grace	Buddy	Regional, Steppenwolf Theatre Company	
2025	Bug	Peter Evans	Broadway, Samuel J. Friedman Theatre	
2026	Windfall	Officer, Brother 1	Regional, Steppenwolf Theatre Company	
