= Rounding (film) =

2022 American psychological drama film

- Film poster
- Directed by: Alex Thompson
- Written by: Alex Thompson; Christopher Thompson
- Starring: Namir Smallwood; Sidney Flanigan; Michael Potts
- Cinematography: Nate Hurtsellers
- Edited by: Mike S. Smith
- Music by: Macie Stewart; Quinn Tsan
- Production companies: Chicago Media Angels; Divisionist Films; Fifth Season; MarVista Entertainment; Metropolitan Entertainment; Runaway Train; [redacted] Entertainment
- Distributed by: Music Box Films
- Release dates: June 9, 2022 (Tribeca Film Festival); February 14, 2025 (United States)
- Running time: 91 minutes
- Country: United States
- Language: English

Rounding is a 2022 American psychological drama film directed by Alex Thompson and starring Namir Smallwood, Sidney Flanigan, and Michael Potts.

== Premise ==
James Hayman, a medical resident, transfers to a regional hospital after a traumatic incident. There he encounters Helen, a teenage girl hospitalized for asthma, and he becomes fixated on perceived peculiarities in her case and diagnosis.

== Cast ==
- Namir Smallwood as Dr. James Hayman
- Sidney Flanigan as Helen Adso
- Michael Potts as Dr. Emil Harrison
- Rebecca Spence as Karen Adso
- Charin Alvarez as Sam
- Nadirah Bost as Geraldine Hugg
- Cheryl Lynn Bruce as Vivian Spurlock
- Pierce Cravens as Peter
- David Cromer as Mark
- Edwin Lee Gibson as Mr. Jones
- Kelly O'Sullivan as Dr. Kayla Matthews

== Release ==
Rounding was premiered in the United States in 2022 at the Tribeca Film Festival. It was released in the United States on February 14, 2025.

== Reception ==
On the review aggregator website Rotten Tomatoes, 66% of 32 critics' reviews are positive. The website's consensus reads: "Even though Rounding doesn't fully live up to its best expectations, this psychological drama creeps under the skin thanks in part to Namir Smallwood's winning performance." Metacritic, which uses a weighted average, assigned the film a score of 65 out of 100, based on 10 critics, indicating "generally favorable" reviews.

Nick Rocco Scalia of Film Threat praised Smallwood's performance, calling it "a breakout effort that generates great sympathy for the character." Richard Roeper of the Chicago Sun-Times likewise praised Smallwood's performance and called the film's depictions of stress "absolutely visceral." Sheila O'Malley, writing for RogerEbert.com, gave the film 2.5 stars out of 4, concluding that, "as a portrayal of a man falling apart from overwhelming stress", it "works quite well."
