= Grey House (play) =

2019 play by Levi Holloway

- Promotional poster for the 2023 Broadway production
- Written by: Levi Holloway
- Original language: English
- Genre: Thriller

Premiere
- Date premiered: December 1, 2019
- Place premiered: A Red Orchid Theatre

Grey House is a dramatic stage play written by American playwright Levi Holloway. The play premiered at the A Red Orchid Theatre in Chicago on December 1, 2019, and debuted on Broadway at the Lyceum Theatre on May 30, 2023, starring Tatiana Maslany, Paul Sparks, and Laurie Metcalf.

== Synopsis ==
Max and Henry, a young married couple, wreck their car in the mountains during a blizzard. They take shelter in a cabin occupied by a group of teenage girls and an old lady who claims to be their mother. During their stay, the girls imply that Max and Henry were not drawn to the house by the car accident, but their own pasts.

== Characters and original casts ==
Character	A Red Orchid Theatre (2019)	Lyceum Theatre (2023)
Max	Sadieh Rifai	Tatiana Maslany
Henry	Travis A. Knight	Paul Sparks
Raleigh	Kirsten Fitzgerald	Laurie Metcalf
Marlow	Sarah Cartwright	Sophia Anne Caruso
Bernie	Kayla Casiano	Millicent Simmonds
A1656	Haley Bolithon	Alyssa Emily Marvin
Squirrel	Autumn Hlava	Colby Kipnes
The Boy	Charlie Herman	Eamon Patrick O'Connell
The Ancient	Dado	Cyndi Coyne

== Productions ==
Grey House is a stage thriller written by Levi Holloway. The play premiered at the A Red Orchid Theatre, Chicago on December 1, 2019. It was directed by Shade Murray and Sadieh Rifai, Travis A. Knight and Kirsten Fitzgerald were cast in the lead roles. It received 3 Jeff Awards in 2020.

In February 2023, a Broadway production was announced. It would be directed by Joe Mantello and produced by Tom Kirdahy, Matthew Patrick, Stephanie Patrick and Robert Ahrens. Tatiana Maslany, Paul Sparks, Laurie Metcalf, Sophia Anne Caruso and Millicent Simmonds were cast in the lead roles. In March 2023, Cyndi Coyne, Colby Kipnes, Eamon Patrick O’Connell and Alyssa Emily Marvin were announced as joining the cast. The play premiered on Broadway at the Lyceum Theatre. Previews began on April 29, 2023, with an official opening night on May 30, 2023. Though it was originally set to run through September 3, 2023, the play closed on July 30 due to low ticket sales.

== Reception ==
The Broadway production received mixed reviews. Critics praised the actors' performances as well as Scott Pask's set design, Natasha Katz's lighting design, and Tom Gibbons's sound design. Some reviewers were critical, however, of the play's attempts to use horror-movie tropes in a live production and of unclear plot points.

== Awards and nominations ==
=== 2023 Broadway production ===
Year	Award	Category	Work	Result	Ref.
2024	Tony Award	Best Lighting Design of a Play	Natasha Katz	Nominated	
2024	Tony Award	Best Sound Design of a Play	Tom Gibbons	Nominated	
2024	Drama Desk Award	Outstanding Scenic Design of a Play	Scott Pask	Nominated	
2024	Drama Desk Award	Outstanding Lighting Design of a Play	Natasha Katz	Nominated	
2024	Drama Desk Award	Outstanding Sound Design of a Play	Tom Gibbons	Nominated	
2024	Outer Critics Circle Award	Outstanding Sound Design	Tom Gibbons	Nominated	
