= Nassim Soleimanpour =

Iranian playwright (born 1981)

Nassim Soleimanpour (Persian: نسیم سلیمان‌پور, born 10 December 1981) is an Iranian playwright. He is best known for his 2010 play White Rabbit Red Rabbit.

== Early life and education ==
Soleimanpour was born in Tehran, Iran. His father is a novelist.

He studied set design at the University of Tehran, and started teaching a computer-aided set design course there, but always continued to write – poems, short stories and stage plays.

Having refused compulsory military service in Iran, he was not allowed to leave the country until 2013, when he was granted a passport.

== Works ==
=== White Rabbit Red Rabbit ===
Soleimanpour's 2010 play White Rabbit Red Rabbit has been performed widely and in more than 20 languages. It is to be performed each night by a different actor, who has not seen the script before. First performed at the 2011 Edinburgh Festival Fringe and Clubbed Thumb's Summerworks festivals, it has since been performed by an array of A-list actors, including F. Murray Abraham, Wayne Brady, Bobby Cannavale, Darren Criss, Brian Dennehy, Joyce DiDonato, Whoopi Goldberg, Nathan Lane, Cynthia Nixon, Patrick Wilson, Stana Katic and many more at its premiere in New York City at the Westside Theatre in 2016 where it ran for 42 weeks, produced by Tom Kirdahy. Soleimanpour first saw the play in 2013 at the Brisbane Powerhouse, Australia, during the World Theatre Festival.

In summer 2024 it was announced that the play will be performed for the first time in London's West End in October of the same year at Soho place. The vast array of performers included Freema Agyeman, Olly Alexander, John Bishop, Alan Davies, Daisy Edgar Jones, Omari Douglas, Alfred Enoch, Jill Halfpenny, Jason Isaacs, Pearl Mackie, Sally Phillips, Jonathan Pryce, Michael Sheen, Tonia Sotiropoulou and Deborah Frances-White. The play run was extended multiple times, due to many performances being sold out and new performers added such as Elizabeth McGovern, Toby Jones, Adjoa Andoh, Miriam Margolyes, Stockard Channing, Sanjeev Bhaskar, Rory Kinnear, Lenny Henry, Minnie Driver, Ambika Mod, Katherine Parkinson, Christopher Eccleston, Nish Kumar, Ginger Johnson, and Munya Chawawa.

=== Other works ===
His play Blind Hamlet premiered during the 2014 Edinburgh Festival Fringe at the Assembly Roxy.

Nassim, which requires the actor and audience members to speak Farsi (Persian), premiered in Edinburgh in 2017 and played at the Arts Centre Melbourne in early 2018. Nassim had its New York premiere in December 2018 at Stage II of the New York City Center, where it played until April 20.

== Awards ==
Soleimanpour has won several awards, including:

- Dublin Fringe Festival Best New Performance 2012
- Summerworks Outstanding New Performance Text Award 2011
- The Arches Brick Award, Edinburgh Festival Fringe 2011
