= Bug (play) =

1995 play by Tracy Letts

- Original language: English
- Written by: Tracy Letts
- Characters: Peter Evans; Agnes White; Jerry Goss; Dr. Sweet; R.C. Pizza Harris
- Genre: Black comedy
- Setting: Oklahoma, USA

Premiere
- Date: 20 September 1996
- Place: London, England

Bug is a play by American playwright Tracy Letts. Exploring themes of paranoia and conspiracy theories, the play tells the story of a woman who, as she spends time with a newly acquainted man in her motel room, starts sharing more and more of his paranoias. It premiered in London in 1996, and was also performed around the United States between 2000 and 2004.

The play was adapted into a film of the same name directed by William Friedkin in 2006, with Letts writing the screenplay and Michael Shannon, who had played the male lead role of Peter in the original London production and in some American versions, reprising his role.

== Synopsis ==
Most of the play takes place in a seedy motel room. Lonely cocktail waitress Agnes lives there, hiding from her violent ex-husband Jerry Goss, an ex-con. One night, her lesbian biker friend R.C. introduces her to Peter, a Gulf War veteran who might be AWOL. She gets involved with Peter, who grows increasingly paranoid about the Gulf War, UFOs, the Oklahoma City bombing of the federal building, cult suicides, and secret government experiments on soldiers. He eventually draws Agnes into his delusions. The play explores issues of love, paranoia, conspiracy theories, and Agnes's slow descent into insanity under Peter's influence.

== Production history ==
=== London premiere ===
The play originally premiered at the Gate Theatre in Notting Hill, London, on September 20, 1996. The rehearsals were at A Red Orchid Theatre in Chicago, Illinois. It starred Shannon Cochran and Michael Shannon.

=== American premieres ===
Following its London run, the play made its U.S. debut in Ithaca, New York. In Washington, D.C., the play underwent a series of revisions and received an American premiere at Woolly Mammoth Theatre Company in March/April 2000. Directed by Wilson Milam, the cast featured Deborah Hazlett, Eric Sutton, Steve Schmidt, Kate Eastwood Norris, and Brian Hemmingsen. It opened March 18, 2000 and closed April 16, 2000.

The play's Chicago premiere was at A Red Orchid Theatre, where the play first rehearsed prior to its world premiere in London. Directed by Dexter Bullard, the cast featured Kate Buddeke, Michael Shannon, Guy Van Swearingen III, Robin Witt, and Troy West. It opened August 20, 2001 and closed October 28, 2001.

=== Off-Broadway ===
Bug opened off-Broadway at the Barrow Street Theatre on February 29, 2004 and closed January 30, 2005. The cast featured Shannon Cochran, Michael Shannon, Michael Cullen, Amy Landecker, and Reed Birney. Cochran replaced Amanda Plummer, who resigned from the Off-Broadway premiere just days before its February 21 start date due to artistic differences with its director, Dexter Bullard. A notice in the theater box office warned that the show contained nudity, violence and cigarette smoking.

=== Australia ===
The play premiered at The SBW Stables Theatre in Kings Cross, Sydney, in May 2010, as part of Griffin Theatre Company's Independent Season 2010, in conjunction with Picture This Productions. It opened 12 May 2010 and closed 5 June 2010. Directed by Anthony Skuse, it featured Jeanette Cronin, Matthew Walker, Jonny Pasvolsky, Catherine Terracini, and Laurence Coy.

=== Broadway ===
In January 2026, Bug made its Broadway premiere at the Samuel J. Friedman Theatre, directed by David Cromer, and starring Carrie Coon, Letts's wife, as Agnes and Namir Smallwood as Peter. The production previously played at the Steppenwolf Theatre Company in 2020 and 2021. Letts observed, "So conspiracy theories have become much more mainstream in the intervening years since I wrote the play. And so, I thought, it seemed like time for revival."

== Original casts and characters ==
Character	London	Washington, D.C.	Chicago	Off-Broadway	Australia	Broadway
Character	1996	2000	2001	2004	2010	2026
Agnes White	Shannon Cochran	Deborah Hazlett	Kate Buddeke	Shannon Cochran	Jeanette Cronin	Carrie Coon
Peter Evans	Michael Shannon	Eric Sutton	Michael Shannon	Michael Shannon	Matthew Walker	Namir Smallwood
Jerry Goss	Marc A. Nelson	Steve Schmidt	Guy Van Swearingen III	Michael Cullen	Jonny Pasvolsky	Steve Key
R.C.	Holly Wantuch	Kate Eastwood Norris	Robin Witt	Amy Landecker	Catherine Terracini	Jennifer Engstrom
Dr. Sweet	Jeff Still	Brian Hemmingsen	Troy West	Reed Birney	Laurence Coy	Randall Arney

== Film adaptation ==
A film version of the play was released in 2006 from Lionsgate. It was directed by William Friedkin, and starred Ashley Judd, Harry Connick Jr. and Michael Shannon. Friedkin had watched and then re-watched the play at the Barrow Street Theatre with Shannon and Cochran, who had replaced Amanda Plummer at short notice. Friedkin then contacted Tracy Letts and together they cooperated on a screen adaptation. Friedkin described the film as "the most intense piece of work I've ever done". Michael Shannon had played the part on stage. Lionsgate wanted to cast an actor with more name recognition, but Friedkin was determined to have Shannon perform in the film, saying he brought a unique quality to the part.

== Awards and nominations ==
=== 2004 Off-Broadway production ===
Year	Award	Category	Work	Result	Ref.
2004	Drama Desk Awards	Outstanding Actress in a Play	Shannon Cochran	Nominated	
2004	Drama Desk Awards	Outstanding Director of a Play	Dexter Bullard	Nominated	
2004	Drama Desk Awards	Outstanding Sound Designer	Brian Ronan	Nominated	
2004	Lucille Lortel Awards	Outstanding Play		Won	
2004	Lucille Lortel Awards	Outstanding Director	Dexter Bullard	Won	
2004	Lucille Lortel Awards	Outstanding Lighting Design	Tyler Micoleau	Won	
2004	Lucille Lortel Awards	Outstanding Sound Design	Brian Ronan	Won	
2004	Obie Awards	Best New American Play	Bug	Won	
2004	Obie Awards	Outstanding Performance	The acting company of Bug - Shannon Cochran, Michael Shannon, Michael Cullen, Amy Landecker, Reed Birney	Won	
2004	Obie Awards	Outstanding Design Team	The design team of Bug - Lauren Helpern (sets), Tyler Micoleau (lights), Brian Ronan (sound), Kim Gill (costumes), Faye Armon (props)	Won	
2004	Theatre World Award		Shannon Cochran	Won	

=== 2026 Broadway revival ===
Year	Award	Category	Work	Result	Ref.
2026	Drama League Awards	Outstanding Revival of a Play		Nominated	
2026	Drama League Awards	Distinguished Performance	Carrie Coon	Nominated	
2026	Tony Awards	Best Performance by a Leading Actress in a Play	Carrie Coon	Nominated	
2026	Tony Awards	Best Scenic Design of a Play	Takeshi Kata	Nominated	
2026	Tony Awards	Best Lighting Design of a Play	Heather Gilbert	Nominated	
2026	Tony Awards	Best Sound Design of a Play	Josh Schmidt	Nominated	
