= Simpatico (film) =

- Theatrical release poster
- Directed by: Matthew Warchus
- Screenplay by: Matthew Warchus; David Nicholls
- Based on: Simpatico by Sam Shepard
- Produced by: Jean-François Fonlupt; Dan Lupovitz; Timm Oberwelland
- Starring: Nick Nolte; Jeff Bridges; Sharon Stone; Catherine Keener; Albert Finney; Liam Waite
- Cinematography: Laurent Bassett; John Toll
- Edited by: Pasquale Buba; Seth Flaum
- Music by: Stewart Copeland
- Production companies: Emotion Pictures; Le Studio Canal+ Zeal Pictures; Kingsgate
- Distributed by: Fine Line Features (United States); BAC Films (France)
- Release dates: September 15, 1999 (Toronto); January 28, 2000 (United States)
- Running time: 106 minutes
- Countries: France; United States
- Language: English
- Budget: $10 million
- Box office: $1.3 million

Simpatico is a 1999 crime film co-written and directed by Matthew Warchus and starring Nick Nolte, Jeff Bridges, Sharon Stone, Catherine Keener and Albert Finney. It was adapted for the screen from the 1994 play Simpatico by Sam Shepard.

== Plot ==
Three young confidence tricksters— Vinnie, Carter and Rosie — pull off a racing scam, substituting winners for plodders and winning big money on long odds. When an official uncovers the scam, they set him up for blackmail. Twenty years later, Carter and Rosie are married, successful racers in Kentucky about to sell their prize stallion, Simpatico. Vinnie, meanwhile, is a drunk in Pomona. Vinnie decides to make a play for Rosie, lures Carter to California, steals his wallet and heads for Kentucky with the original blackmail material. Carter begs Vinnie's friend, a grocery clerk named Cecilia, to follow Vinnie and recover the material that he has in a box.

== Cast ==
- Nick Nolte as Vinnie Webb
  - Shawn Hatosy as Young Vinnie Webb
- Jeff Bridges as Lyle Carter
- Sharon Stone as Rosie Carter
  - Kimberly Williams-Paisley as Young Rosie Carter
- Catherine Keener as Cecilia
- Albert Finney as Simms

== Reception ==
The film was not well received by critics. On the review aggregator website Rotten Tomatoes, 25% of 60 critics' reviews are positive. The website's consensus reads: "Critics say Simpatico's lengthy plot is too unfocused; the movie becomes confusing and tedious to watch." Metacritic, which uses a weighted average, assigned the film a score of 41 out of 100, based on 25 critics, indicating "mixed or average" reviews.

Roger Ebert gave the film one and a half stars describing the film as " long slog through perplexities and complexities that disguise what this really is: the kind of B-movie plot that used to clock in at 75 minutes on the bottom half of a double bill." Kevin Thomas of Los Angeles Times praised the cast but found the film disappointing saying "while it’s entertaining, it’s not as persuasive as it needs to be to succeed fully."
