= Catherine Terracini =

Australian actress and producer

- Born: 1981 or 1982 (age 44–45); Lake Como, Italy
- Education: National Institute of Dramatic Art
- Occupations: Actress, producer
- Parent(s): Elizabeth Terracini; Lyndon Terracini

Catherine Terracini is an Australian actress and producer who has been working in Australian theatre, film and television and commercials since 2004.

== Early life and education ==
Catherine Terracini was born in 1981 or 1982 (age 44–45) in Italy to Australian parents living in Palanzo, near the village of Como. Her father is opera singer and artistic director of Opera Australia, Lyndon Terracini and her mother is arts administrator Elizabeth Terracini. Her parents returned to their home country in 1987, settling in the town of Lismore, New South Wales.

Terracini attended high school at Trinity Catholic College before being accepted to the Acting Degree Program at National Institute of Dramatic Art (NIDA) in Sydney one year after graduating high school.

== Career ==
Terracini has worked in theatre, film, television, and commercials since graduating from NIDA. In 2010 she performed in the play Bug by Pulitzer Prize-winning American writer Tracy Letts for Griffin Independent and won the award for Best Actress at Brisbane International Film Festival's Warner Roadshow New Filmmaker's Awards in 2009 for the Short Film Let Go.

In 2012, Terracini was awarded a Mike Walsh Fellowship. Terracini is a Dame Joan Sutherland Fund recipient from the American Australian Association which allowed her to study with The Barrow Group in New York City in 2013.

In 2019, Terracini was appointed creative producer by the effect and animation house, Heckler.

== Filmography ==
=== Film ===
Year	Title	Role	Notes	Ref.
2007	Untouched	Sally	Short film	
2008	Let Go	Holly	Short film	
2008	The Pessimist	Kat	Short film	
2009	Natural Selection	Lucy	Short film	
2010	225	Julie	Short film	
2010	Silent Country	Monica	Short film	
2014	Wyrmwood	Annie	Feature film	

=== Television ===
Year	Title	Role	Notes	Ref.
2007	All Saints ("Thresholds")	Ashley McKay	1 episode	

== Theatre ==
Year	Title	Role	Notes	Ref.
2006	The Cold Child (Australian premiere)	Silke	Griffin Theatre Company	
2007	Human Geographies (The Works)	Various	Queensland Theatre Company	
2008	Colder (World premiere)	Robyn 33	Griffin Theatre Company	
2008	Bloom / Three at The Table / Lazarus Won't Get out of Bed (play development)	Various	QTC	
2009	Richard III	Queen Elizabeth	Carriageworks	
2009	Sydney Ghost Stories	Various roles	Picture This Productions	
2010	Bug	RC	Griffin Theatre Company	
2011	Faustus	Belzebub	Bell Shakespeare	
2012	Shallow Slumber (Australian premiere)	Dawn	G.bod Theatre & NIDA Independent Program	
2015	Hamlet	Fortinbras / Cornelius / Soldier	Tour with Bell Shakespeare	
2016	Tiny Remarkable Bramble	Sonny	Kings Cross Theatre, Sydney	
