= Adult Material =

British television series

- DVD cover
- Genre: Drama
- Written by: Lucy Kirkwood
- Directed by: Dawn Shadforth
- Starring: Hayley Squires; Siena Kelly
- Music by: Hannah Holland
- Country of origin: United Kingdom
- Original language: English
- No. of series: 1
- No. of episodes: 4

Production
- Producer: Anna Goodridge
- Cinematography: Chloë Thomson
- Production company: Fifty Fathoms Productions

Original release
- Network: Channel 4
- Release: 5 October 2020

Adult Material is a four-part British drama television series concerning a woman's life working in the adult film industry. The show starred Hayley Squires and was created by an all female team. The series first aired on Channel 4 on 5 October 2020.

== Synopsis ==
The series follows Hayley Burrows, ostensibly an ordinary hardworking mum-of-three who has been working as Jolene Dollar in the adult entertainment industry for many years. Her life is dramatically changed by an incident between Amy, a new girl in the industry, and an American hardcore actor, Tom Pain.

Jolene meets MP Stella Maitland on a talk show, just before Stella is exposed for downloading porn on her work computer. With her home life falling apart and facing health issues, Jolene decides to quit the industry and gets a job in a coffee bar.

While facing a defamation trial for speaking out about Amy's treatment, Jolene, now supported by the disgraced Stella, goes to extreme lengths to save her family from financial ruin.

== Cast ==
Role	Actor	Notes
Jolene Dollar / Hayley Burrows	Hayley Squires	One of the top porn performers in the UK, and mother of three
Rich	Joe Dempsie	Jolene’s long-term partner, who runs Jolene’s social media
Amy	Siena Kelly	Teenage dancer who has just started working in the porn industry
Stella Maitland	Kerry Godliman	An opinionated MP facing a scandal
Abby	Mandeep Dhillon	Stella's personal assistant and lover
Tom Pain	Julian Ovenden	US porn performer with a reputation for extreme content
Carroll Quinn	Rupert Everett	Wealthy UK porn producer
Phoebe	Alex Jarrett	Jolene’s eldest daughter
Dave	Phil Daniels	Porn director
Sabelle	Timmika Ramsay	Friend of Jolene and a fellow porn performer

== Production ==
Sheridan Smith was originally considered for the Jolene Dollar role, but pulled out due to scheduling conflicts. Adult industry professionals Rebecca More and Danny D were advisors and coaches for the series, with the latter landing a cameo in episode two as reporter Sam Pike.

== Episodes ==
No.	Title	Directed by	Written by	Original release date
1	"Rosebud"	Dawn Shadforth	Lucy Kirkwood	October 5, 2020
2	"Dry for Wet"	Dawn Shadforth	Lucy Kirkwood	October 5, 2020
3	"Hayley"	Dawn Shadforth	Lucy Kirkwood	October 5, 2020
4	"Deep Fake"	Dawn Shadforth	Lucy Kirkwood	October 5, 2020

== Reception ==
Based on the review aggregator Rotten Tomatoes 93% of the 14 reviews are positive. Lucy Mangan of The Guardian gave it four stars, calling it "perfect drama". James Walton of The Spectator called it: "Funny, tender and properly horrible."

== Accolades ==
The show received four BAFTA nominations, including Best Mini-Series and Best Actress, for Hayley Squires.
