= Siena Kelly =

British actress

- Born: Siena Nicole Kelly; 1996 (age 29–30); Camden, London, England
- Education: ArtsEd
- Years active: 2017–present

Siena Nicole Kelly (born 1996) is a British actress. She earned a British Academy Television Award nomination for her performance in the Channel 4 drama Adult Material (2020). She has since played the titular character in BBC Three fantasy series Domino Day (2024) and appeared in the Netflix anthology Black Mirror (2025). Kelly is also known for her stage work, earning an Ian Charleson nomination.

== Early life ==
Kelly was born in the North London Borough of Camden. She initially trained as a dancer and performed in dance competitions. She graduated from Arts Educational School (ArtsEd) in 2017. She is a certified yoga instructor and teaches in London when she is not working as an actor.

== Career ==
After graduating from ArtsEd, Kelly made her professional stage debut as Ivy Green in On the Town at Regent's Park Open Air Theatre. For her performance, she was nominated for Best Actress in a Musical at The Stage Debut Awards.

Kelly made her television debut as Rhoda Swartz in the 2018 miniseries adaptation of Vanity Fair on ITV.

In 2020, Kelly starred as Amy in the Channel 4 drama miniseries Adult Material. For her performance, she was nominated for Best Supporting Actress at the 2021 British Academy Television Awards.

Kelly has focused on theatre, working on new and classical productions. Starring as Maggie in Cat on a Hot Tin Roof, Nora in A Dolls House and Anna in 1536.

She had her next leading screen role in 2024 BBC Three fantasy series Domino Day as the titular character. Kelly led an episode of Season 7 Black Mirror in 2025 and will star in new drama Charmer for Sky.

== Filmography ==
Year	Title	Role	Notes
2018	Vanity Fair	Rhoda Swartz	
2019	Temple	Michelle Wilson	Series 1
2020	Adult Material	Amy Deighton	Lead role BAFTA nomination
2021	Hit & Run	Syd	
2024	Domino Day	Domino	Lead role
2025	Black Mirror	Maria	Bête Noire Lead Role
2026	Pride and Prejudice	Caroline Bingley	
2026	The Rapture	Anika Drake	
2027	Charmer	Emily	Lead role

== Stage ==
Year	Title	Role	Notes
2017	On the Town	Ivy Green	Regent's Park Open Air Theatre, London
2017	A Christmas Carol	Jess	Old Vic, London
2018	Describe the Night		Hampstead Theatre, London
2019	Teenage Dick	Anne Margaret	Donmar Warehouse, London
2021	Cat on a Hot Tin Roof	Maggie	UK Tour
2022	Force Majeure	Jenny	Donmar Warehouse, London
2022	That is Not Who I Am	Celeste	Royal Court Theatre, London
2024	A Doll's House	Nora	Crucible Theatre, Sheffield
2025	1536	Anna	Almeida Theatre, London
2026	1536	Anna	Ambassadors Theatre, London

== Awards and nominations ==
Year	Award	Category	Work	Result	Ref.
2017	The Stage Debut Awards	Best Actress in a Musical	On the Town	Nominated	
2021	British Academy Television Awards	Best Supporting Actress	Adult Material	Nominated	
2025	Ian Charleson Awards		A Doll's House	Nominated	
