= A Red Orchid Theatre =

Chicagoan theatre founded in 1993

Coordinates: 41.9100°N 87.6345°W

- Formation: 1993
- Type: Theatre group
- Location: Chicago, Illinois
- Artistic director: Kirsten Fitzgerald
- Notable members: Michael Shannon; Natalie West
- Website: aredorchidtheatre.org

A Red Orchid Theatre is located in the Old Town district of Chicago, founded in 1993. Kirsten Fitzgerald has been the artistic director since 2008.

== Notable productions ==
Notable productions include a revival of Sam Shepard's Simpatico and Eugène Ionesco's The Killer, Notable world premieres include Tracy Letts' Bug and Craig Wright's Mistakes Were Made. A Red Orchid is also known for an experimental 1996 production of Arthur Kopit's The Questioning of Nick starring Nick Offerman, Michael Shannon, and Guy Van Swearingen that was performed three times in succession with the actors switching roles each time.

In the summer of 2014, the company took its premiere production of The Opponent by ensemble member Brett Neveu to New York's 59E59 Theaters with the original cast (ensemble members Guy Van Swearingen and Kamal Angelo Bolden), director (ensemble member Karen Kessler) and designers (Joey Wade, Myron Elliott, Joe Court, John Tovar and ensemble member Mike Durst).

In Fall 2017, McCarter Theatre Center presented A Red Orchid's 2013 production of Simpatico. This production featured much of the original cast and crew including Michael Shannon.

== Ensemble members (selection) ==
- Brett Neveu
- Danny McCarthy
- Levi Holloway
- Michael Shannon
- Natalie West

== Awards and nominations ==
=== MacArthur Award ===
In 2016, A Red Orchid Theatre became the recipient of the MacArthur Foundation's MacArthur Award for Creative & Effective Institutions. This MacArthur Award included a $200,000 grant to be used to "establish a cash reserve and implement its audience development plan that includes new marketing and audience engagement strategies."

=== Joseph Jefferson Awards ===
The company has received many Joseph Jefferson Awards, awards honoring Chicago theatre.

==== Non-Equity ====
Year	Work	Category	Artist	Result
1997	Canus Lunis Baloonis	Ensemble		Nominated
1997	Canus Lunis Baloonis	New Work	Christian Stolte	Won

==== Equity ====
Year	Work	Category	Artist	Result
1999	The Cut	Scenic Design	Stephanie Nelson	Won
1999	The Cut	Sound Design	Joseph Fosco	Nominated
2000	Mr. Bundy	Actress in a Supporting Role	Kirsten Fitzgerald	Nominated
2002	Bug	Actor in a Principal Role	Michael Shannon	Nominated
2002	Bug	Actress in a Principal Role	Kate Buddeke	Nominated
2002	Bug	Sound Design	Joseph Fosco	Nominated
2006	The Sea Horse	Actor in a Principal Role - Play	Guy Van Swearingen	Nominated
2006	The Sea Horse	Actress in a Principal Role - Play	Kirsten Fitzgerald	Won
2006	The Sea Horse	Scenic Design	Grant Sabin	Nominated
2006	Kimberly Akimbo	Actor in a Supporting Role - Play	Steve Haggard	Nominated
2008	Fatboy	Costume Design - Midsize	Karen Kawa	Nominated
2009	Pumpgirl	Actress in a Principal Role - Play	Kirsten Fitzgerald	Nominated
2009	The Unseen	Lighting Design - Midsize	Matthew Gawryk	Nominated
2009	The Unseen	Sound Design - Midsize	Joe Court	Nominated
2010	Abigail's Party	Production Play - Midsize		Nominated
2010	Abigail's Party	Ensemble		Nominated
2010	Abigail's Party	Director - Play	Shade Murray	Nominated
2010	Abigail's Party	Actress in a Principal Role - Play	Kirsten Fitzgerald	Nominated
2010	Abigail's Party	Actress in a Supporting Role - Play	Natalie West	Won
2010	Mistakes Were Made	New Work	Craig Wright	Nominated
2010	Mistakes Were Made	Actor in a Principal Role	Michael Shannon	Nominated
2011	The New Electric Ballroom	Sound Design - Midsize	Joseph Fosco	Nominated
2012	The Butcher of Baraboo	Actress in a Supporting Role - Play	Natalie West	Won
2012	Megacosm	Projections/ Media Design	Seth Henrikson & Oddmachine	Nominated
2013	In A Garden	Actor in a Principal Role - Play	Rom Barkhordar	Nominated
2013	Simpatico	Production Play - Midsize		Nominated
2013	Simpatico	Actor in a Principal Role - Play	Michael Shannon	Won
2013	Simpatico	Actor in a Principal Role - Play	Guy Van Swearingen	Nominated
2013	The Opponent	Actor in a Principal Role - Play	Kamal Angelo Bolden	Nominated
2013	The Opponent	Fight / Movement Direction	John Tovar	Won
2014	Trevor	Actor in a Principal Role - Play	Lawrence Grimm	Nominated
2015	Accidentally Like A Martyr	Scenic Design - Midsize	John Holt	Won
2016	Pilgrim's Progress	Production Play - Midsize		Nominated
2016	The Mutilated	Production Play - Midsize		Nominated
2016	The Mutilated	Actress in a Principal Role - Play	Jennifer Engstrom	Nominated
2016	The Mutilated	Original Music in a Play	Brando Triantafillou	Nominated
2017	The Room	Sound Design - Midsize	Heath Hays	Nominated
2018	Traitor	Production Play - Midsize		Won
2018	Traitor	Ensemble - Play		Nominated
2018	Traitor	New Adaptation	Brett Neveu	Won
2018	Traitor	Director - Play - Midsize	Michael Shannon	Won
2019	Small Mouth Sounds	Ensemble - Play		Nominated
2019	Small Mouth Sounds	Sound Design - Midsize	Jeffrey Levin	Nominated
2020	Grey House	Production - Play - Midsize		Nominated
2020	Grey House	Ensemble - Play		Nominated
2020	Grey House	New Work	Levi Holloway	Won
2020	Grey House	Director - Play - Midsize	Shade Murray	Nominated
2020	Grey House	Scenic Design - Midsize	Kurtis Boetcher	Nominated
2020	Grey House	Sound Design - Midsize	Jeffrey Levin	Won
2020	Grey House	Lighting Design - Midsize	Mike Durst	Won
2020	Do You Feel Anger?	Performer in a Supporting Role - Play	Sadieh Rifai	Nominated
2022	The Moors	Production - Play - Midsize		Won
2022	The Moors	Ensemble - Play		Nominated
2022	The Moors	Director - Play - Midsize	Kirsten Fitzgerald	Won
2022	The Moors	Performer in a Supporting Role - Play	Jennifer Engstrom	Nominated
2022	The Moors	Costume Design - Midsize	Myron Elliott-Cisneros	Won
2022	The Moors	Sound Design - Midsize	Jeffrey Levin	Won
2022	The Moors	Lighting Design - Midsize	K Story	Won
2022	Last Hermanos	Fight Choreography	Dave Gonzalez	Nominated
2023	Is God Is	Production - Play - Midsize		Nominated
2023	Is God Is	Director - Play - Midsize	Marti Gobel	Nominated
2023	Is God Is	Performer in a Supporting Role - Play	Karen Aldridge	Won
2023	Is God Is	Lighting Design - Midsize	Levi Wilkins	Nominated
2023	Is God Is	Fight Choreography	Jyreika Guest	Nominated
2024	Revolution	New Work	Brett Neveu	Nominated
2024	Revolution	Performer in a Supporting Role - Play	Natalie West	Nominated
2024	In Quietness	Performer in a Supporting Role - Play	Alexandra Chopson	Won
2024	Turret	Production - Play - Midsize		Won
2024	Turret	New Work	Levi Holloway	Nominated
2024	Turret	Director - Play - Midsize	Levi Holloway	Nominated
2024	Turret	Performer in a Principal Role - Play	Travis A. Knight	Nominated
2024	Turret	Performer in a Principal Role - Play	Michael Shannon	Nominated
2024	Turret	Scenic Design - Midsize	Grant Sabin	Won
2024	Turret	Sound Design - Midsize	Jeffrey Levin	Nominated
2024	Turret	Lighting Design - Midsize	Mike Durst	Won
2024	Turret	Original Music in a Play	Jeffrey Levin	Won
2025	The Cave	New Work	Sadieh Rifai	Nominated
2025	Six Men Dressed Like Joseph Stalin	Sound Design - Midsize	Angela Joy Baldasare	Nominated
2025	Six Men Dressed Like Joseph Stalin	Lighting Design - Midsize	Levi J. Wilkins	Nominated
