= 1536 (play) =

2025 stage play written by Ava Pickett

- West End promotional poster
- Written by: Ava Pickett
- Characters: Anne; Jane; Mariella

Premiere
- Date: 6 May 2025
- Place: Almeida Theatre, London
- Directed by: Lyndsey Turner

1536 is a stage play written by Ava Pickett following three friends who receive word about Anne Boleyn's demise, seeing the parallels in the rise of patriarchy in their village. It had its world premiere at London's Almeida Theatre in 2025 and the Ambassadors Theatre in 2026.

== Plot ==
As news of Anne Boleyn's arrest and execution by King Henry VIII spreads across the country, the play follows Anna, Jane and Mariella, three friends reuniting in a field to share news and gossip, as the rumors become reality and begin to inspire the men of their village to mistreat women through force and manipulation.

== Production history ==
=== Off-West End (2025) ===
The play had its world premiere on 2 May 2025 at the Almeida Theatre in London. The production was directed by Lyndsey Turner. Casting included Angus Cooper as William, Liv Hill as Jane, Adam Hugill as Richard, Siena Kelly as Anna, and Tanya Reynolds as Mariella. The production closed on 7 June 2025.

=== West End (2026) ===
The production is scheduled to transfer to London's West End for a limited run in 2026. They began performances from 2 May 2026 at the Ambassadors Theatre and is scheduled to run through 1 August. Liv Hill, Siena Kelly, and Tanya Reynolds are expected to reprise their roles with Oliver Johnstone and George Kemp joining as Richard and William, respectively. Actress Margot Robbie joined the production as a producer.

The production received positive reviews, with London Theatre praising it as " warm, smartly observed, earthily funny" and Theatre and Tonic praising it as a "phenomenal piece of theatre."

== Cast and characters ==
| Character | Off-West End | West End |
| Character | 2025 | 2026 |
|---|---|---|
| William | Angus Cooper | George Kemp |
| Jane | Liv Hill | Liv Hill |
| Richard | Adam Hugill | Oliver Johnstone |
| Anna | Siena Kelly | Siena Kelly |
| Mariella | Tanya Reynolds | Tanya Reynolds |

== Awards and nominations ==
=== 2025 Off-West End production ===
| Year | Award | Category | Nominee | Result |
|---|---|---|---|---|
| 2026 | Laurence Olivier Awards | Best New Play | Ava Pickett | Nominated |
| 2026 | Laurence Olivier Awards | Best Director | Lyndsey Turner | Nominated |

== Television adaptation ==
In August 2026, the eight-part series adaptation was ordered by HBO and BBC. Pickett is set to adapt her own play and serves as showrunner, while Molly Manners directs the series. The series will be produced by Drama Republic.
