= Michael Shannon =

American actor (born 1974)

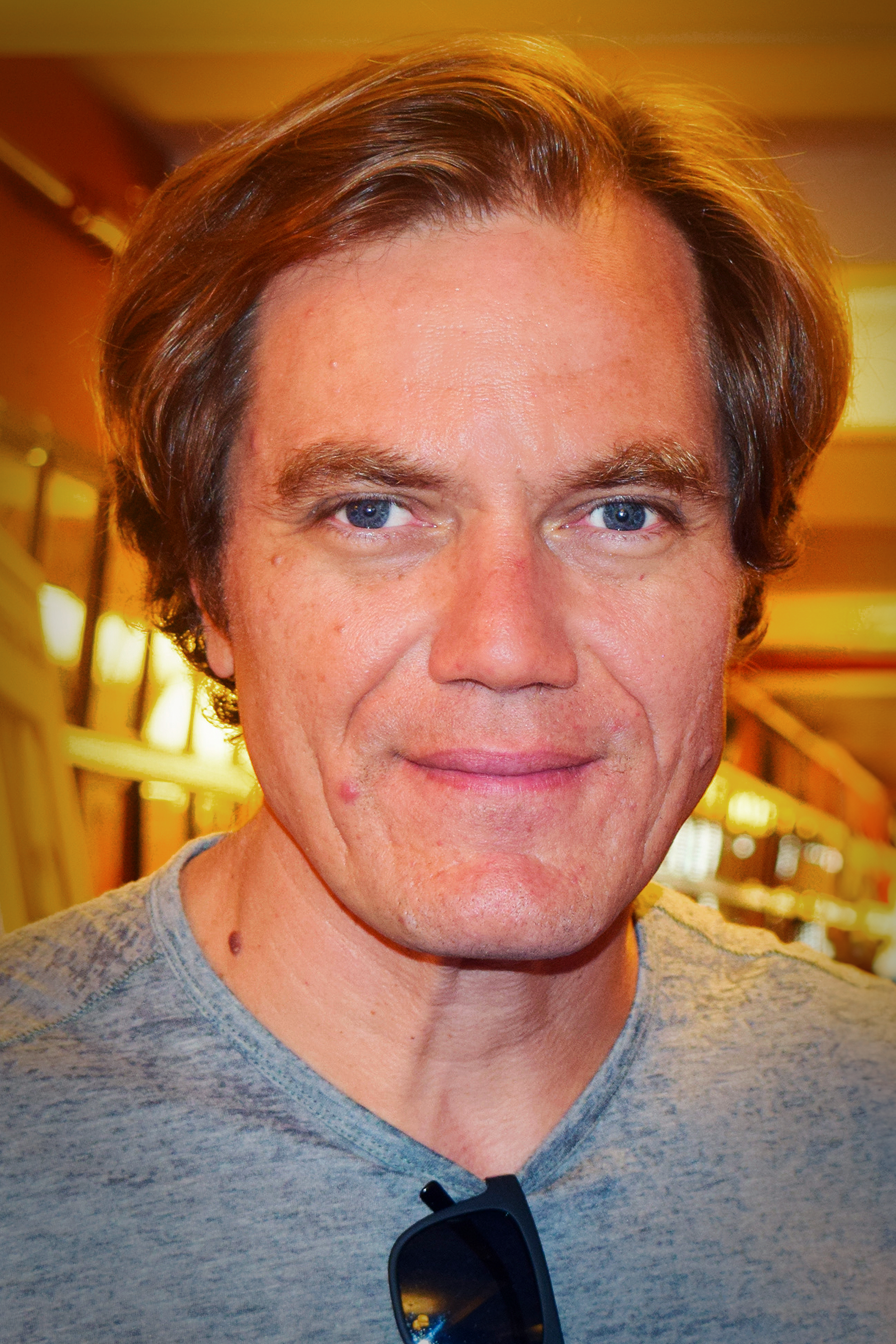
- Shannon in 2019
- Born: Michael Corbett Shannon; August 7, 1974 (age 52); Lexington, Kentucky, U.S.
- Occupations: Actor; producer; musician
- Years active: 1991–present
- Spouse: Kate Arrington (m. 2017, divorced) Christy Bush (m. 2026)
- Children: 2
- Relatives: Raymond Corbett Shannon (paternal grandfather)
- Awards: Full list
- Musical career
- Genres: Indie rock; country; Americana
- Instruments: Vocals, guitar, keyboards
- Years active: 2002-present
- Member of: Corporal
- Website: corporalband.com

Michael Corbett Shannon (born August 7, 1974) is an American actor. Known for his forceful and intense style of acting, he has twice received nominations for the Academy Award for Best Supporting Actor, for Revolutionary Road (2008) and Nocturnal Animals (2016). He received Actor Award and Golden Globe nominations for his role in 99 Homes (2014).

Shannon's film debut was in Groundhog Day (1993). He appeared in Jesus' Son (1999), Pearl Harbor (2001), Kangaroo Jack (2003), Before the Devil Knows You're Dead (2007), The Iceman (2012), The Night Before (2015), The Shape of Water (2017), Knives Out (2019), and Bullet Train (2022). He is a frequent collaborator with director Jeff Nichols, having appeared in all of Nichols' films to date: Shotgun Stories (2007), Take Shelter (2011), Mud (2012), Midnight Special and Loving (both 2016), and The Bikeriders (2023). He played General Zod in the DC Extended Universe films Man of Steel (2013) and The Flash (2023).

Shannon made his Broadway debut in the 2012 play Grace. He returned to Broadway to play James Tyrone Jr. in the revival of Eugene O'Neill's Long Day's Journey into Night (2016) and earned a Tony Award nomination. His television roles include a role as Nelson Van Alden in the HBO period drama series Boardwalk Empire (2010–2014) for which he won two Actor Awards. He also starred in Hulu's Nine Perfect Strangers (2021), and Showtime's George & Tammy (2022), the latter of which he received a nomination for a Primetime Emmy Award. He also played James A. Garfield in the Netflix miniseries Death by Lightning, and Robert H. Jackson in the film Nuremberg (both 2025).

== Early life ==
Shannon was born on August 7, 1974, in Lexington, Kentucky, to Donald Sutherlin Shannon, an accounting professor at DePaul University, and Geraldine Hine, a lawyer. His paternal grandfather was entomologist Raymond Corbett Shannon.

After Shannon's parents divorced, he alternated time with them, living with his mother in Lexington and in Chicago, Illinois, with his father. He attended New Trier Township High School in Winnetka, Illinois, for two years before moving to Henry Clay High School in Lexington, Kentucky, for his junior year. While in Lexington, he participated in the Lexington Children's Theatre summer camp and played bass in his first band, The Jehovah Suspects. He returned to Chicago for his senior year at Evanston Township High School, where he dropped out after a semester.

== Career ==
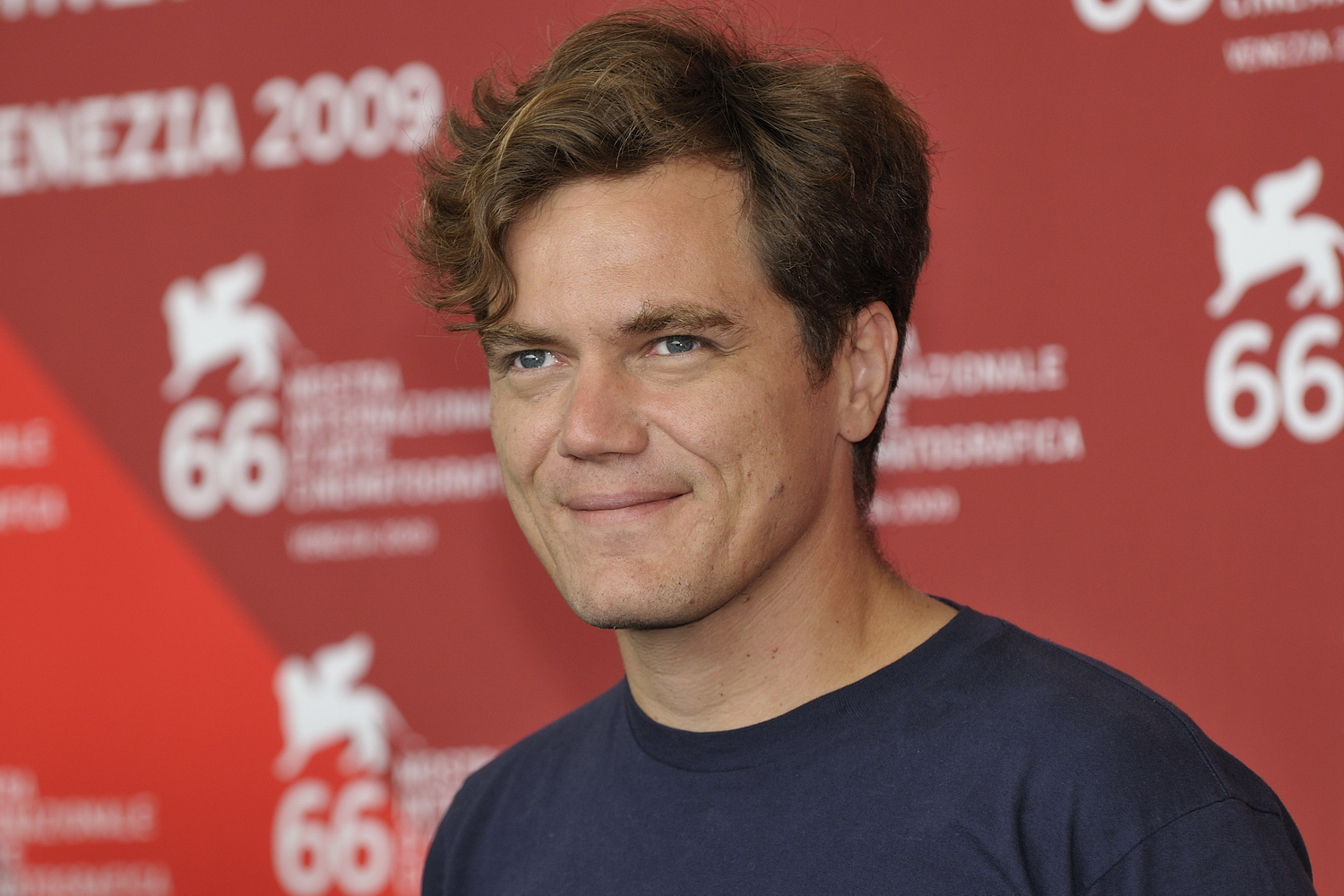
Shannon at the 66th Venice International Film Festival in 2009

Shannon's first screen role was the main character in the music video for the Every Mother's Nightmare song "House of Pain", where he played a troubled teenager who had run away from his abusive home. Shannon performed on stage in Chicago, where he helped found A Red Orchid Theatre. He worked with the Steppenwolf Theatre Company and Northlight Theatre. Shannon originated the role of Peter Evans in Bug in 1996 and starred in the 2006 film adaptation. His roles in Bug and Killer Joe were written by Steppenwolf ensemble member Tracy Letts.

In 1993, Shannon made his film debut in Groundhog Day as a wedding groom. He had roles in Jesus' Son, Pearl Harbor, 8 Mile, Vanilla Sky, Kangaroo Jack, Bad Boys II, and a role in Grand Theft Parsons as hippie Larry Oster-Berg.

Shannon appeared in Let's Go to Prison in 2006, where he portrayed Lynard, the leader of a prison white supremacist group. He appeared in a production of Woyzeck in London's West End, under the direction of playwright Sarah Kane. In 2008, Shannon was featured in the off-Broadway production of Stephen Adly Guirgis's The Little Flower of East Orange, presented by LAByrinth Theater Company and The Public Theater, directed by Philip Seymour Hoffman.

In 2007, Shannon began the first of his many collaborations with director Jeff Nichols, when cast in the movie Shotgun Stories. Shannon was singled out for praise for his performance as the elder brother of three in a morality tale on the dangers of unresolved family enmities.

In 2008, he starred in the romantic drama film Revolutionary Road, alongside Leonardo DiCaprio and Kate Winslet. His performance as the clinically insane son earned him universal acclaim, and he won the Satellite Award for Best Supporting Actor – Motion Picture and received an Academy Award nomination for Best Supporting Actor. In 2010, he portrayed Doc Cross Williams in the film adaptation of Jonah Hex. Shannon played Federal Prohibition agent Nelson Van Alden in the HBO television show Boardwalk Empire, which began in 2010. In November of that year, he began starring in the one man play Mistakes Were Made at the Barrow Street Theatre in New York City, with performances having run through February 27, 2012. Shannon had performed the show in 2009 at A Red Orchid Theatre in Chicago.

In 2011, Shannon starred in the drama film Take Shelter. He received rave reviews for his performance, and a Saturn Award for Best Actor. In 2012, he played a corrupt cop in the film Premium Rush, written and directed by David Koepp, and appeared on Broadway along with Paul Rudd and Ed Asner in Grace written by Craig Wright. In 2013, he starred as legendary mob hitman Richard Kuklinski in The Iceman, which was distributed in May of that year. Later in 2013, Shannon portrayed General Zod, the main antagonist in Zack Snyder's film Man of Steel.

In 2015, he performed in the biographical drama Freeheld, and the independent drama 99 Homes, as housing agent Rick Carver, a role that earned him nominations for the Golden Globe Award for Best Supporting Actor – Motion Picture and the Actor Award for Outstanding Performance by a Male Actor in a Supporting Role. Shannon played Mr. Green in The Night Before in 2015.

Shannon starred in the 2016 psychological thriller film Nocturnal Animals, with Amy Adams and Jake Gyllenhaal. His performance as a detective investigating a double homicide garnered him critical acclaim and a second nomination for the Academy Award for Best Supporting Actor. Also in 2016, Shannon portrayed music icon Elvis Presley alongside Kevin Spacey as President Richard Nixon in Elvis & Nixon.

In 2017, Shannon played Col. Richard Strickland in Guillermo del Toro's romantic fantasy film The Shape of Water. The film premiered at the 74th Venice International Film Festival, where it won the Golden Lion. The Shape of Water went on to win the Oscar for Best Picture at the Academy Awards.

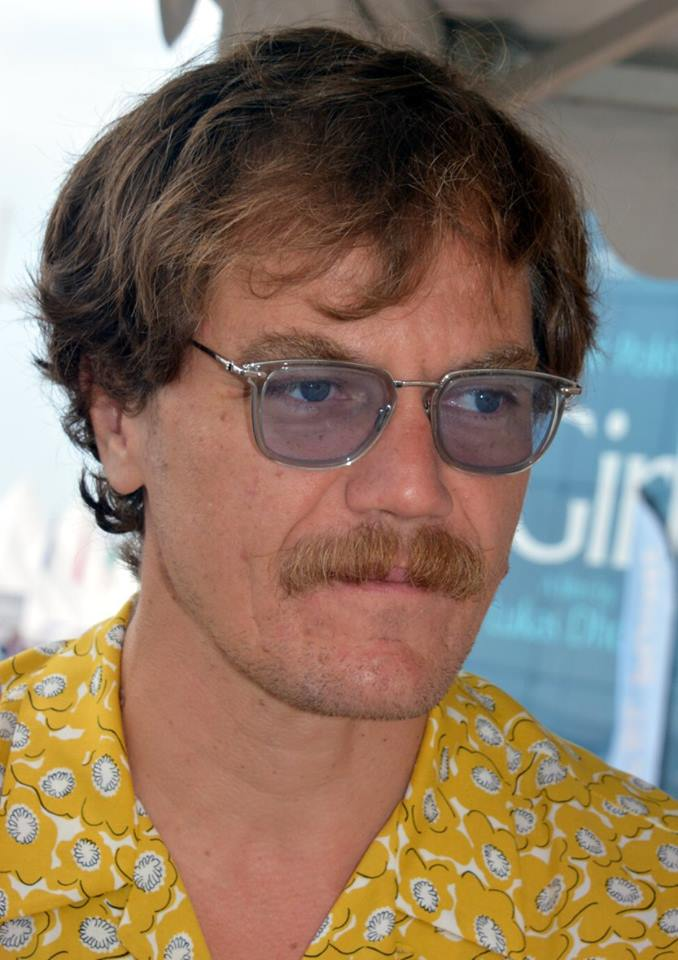
Shannon at the 2018 Cannes Film Festival

Shannon played the lead role as Gary Noesner, head of the FBI Crisis Negotiation Unit, in Waco on Paramount Network in 2018. He appeared in Long Way Back Home, an extended film clip for the song of the same name by Memphis country-punk rock band, Lucero, from its album Among The Ghosts. Lucero's frontman, Ben Nichols, is the older brother of frequent Shannon collaborator Jeff Nichols. Shannon contributed spoken word vocals to Lucero's "Back To The Night", also from Among The Ghosts.

In 2019, Shannon joined an ensemble cast in Rian Johnson's mystery film Knives Out, portraying Walt Thrombey.

In 2021, Shannon played Napoleon Marconi in the Hulu miniseries Nine Perfect Strangers, based on the novel of the same name by Liane Moriarty.

Shannon reprised his role as General Zod in The Flash, released by Warner Bros. in 2023.

In April 2022, a follow-up series to Waco, titled American Tragedies: Waco – The Trials was announced and was set to premiere on Paramount+ in 2023. The miniseries centered on the fallout from the Waco siege as well as the emerging patriot movement. In February 2023, the series was retitled Waco: The Aftermath and would instead premiere on Showtime on April 16, 2023. Shannon reprised his lead role as Gary Noesner and also served as an executive producer for the show.

Shannon also starred as United States President James A. Garfield in the 2025 Netflix miniseries Death by Lightning, and as judge Robert H. Jackson in the film Nuremberg.

== Personal life ==
In 2002, Shannon formed the independent rock band Corporal, with Ray Rizzo and Rob Beitzel, in which he sings and writes lyrics. In 2010, Corporal released its self-titled debut album. The first track, "Glory", was released in 2011 and the second song, "Obama", was released in June 2012 as the band's endorsement of President Obama's run for reelection.

Shannon has performed live with Jason Narducy since 2014, playing covers of whole albums by a variety of artists, including Neil Young, The Modern Lovers, Bob Dylan, The Smiths, and T. Rex. The duo covered Murmur by R.E.M. to mark the album's 40th anniversary at Metro Chicago in July 2023. This resulted in a seven-date U.S. tour in 2024. Shannon and Narducy embarked on a U.S. and UK tour in 2025 playing R.E.M.'s Fables of the Reconstruction.

Shannon married actress Kate Arrington in 2017. They are no longer together as of 2025. He has two daughters and lives in New York.

== Acting credits ==
=== Film ===
Year	Title	Role	Notes
1993	Groundhog Day	Fred	
1996	Chain Reaction	D.C. Flower Delivery Man	Credited as "Mike Shannon"
1997	Chicago Cab	Crack Head	
1999	Jesus' Son	Dundun	
1999	The Ride	Jimmy	
2000	The Photographer	Maurice	
2000	Tigerland	Sergeant Filmore	
2000	Cecil B. Demented	Petie	
2000	Mullitt	Phil Kunz	Short film
2001	Pearl Harbor	Lt. Gooz Wood	
2001	New Port South	John Stanton	
2001	Vanilla Sky	Aaron	
2002	High Crimes	Troy Abbott	
2002	8 Mile	Greg Buehl	
2003	Kangaroo Jack	Frankie Lombardo	
2003	Bad Boys II	Floyd Poteet	
2003	Grand Theft Parsons	Larry Oster-Berg	
2004	Water	Bobby Matherson	
2004	Criminal	Gene	
2004	Dead Birds	Clyde	
2004	Zamboni Man	Walt, Zamboni Man	Short film
2004	The Woodsman	Rosen	
2006	Bug	Peter Evans	
2006	World Trade Center	Dave Karnes	
2006	Let's Go to Prison	Lynard	
2006	Marvelous	John	
2007	Shotgun Stories	Son Hayes	
2007	Blackbird	Murl	
2007	Lucky You	Ray Zumbro	
2007	Before the Devil Knows You're Dead	Dex	
2008	Revolutionary Road	John Givings Jr.	
2009	The Missing Person	John Rosow	
2009	Bad Lieutenant: Port of Call New Orleans	Mundt	
2009	The Greatest	Jordan Walker	
2009	My Son, My Son, What Have Ye Done?	Brad McCullum	
2010	The Runaways	Kim Fowley	
2010	Herbert White	Herbert White	Short film
2010	13	Henry	
2010	Jonah Hex	Dr. Cross Williams	
2011	Take Shelter	Curtis LaForche	
2011	Return	Mike	
2011	The Broken Tower	Emile Opffer	
2011	Machine Gun Preacher	Donnie	
2012	Mud	Uncle Galen	
2012	Premium Rush	Det. Robert "Bobby" Monday	
2012	The Iceman	Richard Kuklinski	
2013	Man of Steel	General Zod	
2013	The Harvest	Richard Young	
2014	Young Ones	Ernest Holm	
2014	They Came Together	Spike	Cameo
2014	She's Funny That Way	Policeman Macy's	Cameo
2014	99 Homes	Rick Carver	
2015	Freeheld	Dane Wells	
2015	The Night Before	Mr. Green	
2016	Complete Unknown	Tom	
2016	Frank & Lola	Frank Reilly	
2016	Midnight Special	Roy Tomlin	
2016	Batman v Superman: Dawn of Justice	General Zod	Credit only (Note: The corpse of Zod in Batman v Superman was made using a physical replica and Shannon did not film any scenes for the film.)
2016	Wolves	Lee Keller	
2016	Poor Boy	Blayde Griggs	
2016	Elvis & Nixon	Elvis Presley	Also executive producer
2016	Loving	Grey Villet	
2016	Salt and Fire	Matt Riley	
2016	Nocturnal Animals	Det. Bobby Andes	
2017	The Shape of Water	Col. Richard Strickland	
2017	The Current War	George Westinghouse	
2017	Pottersville	Maynard Greiger	
2018	12 Strong	CWO. Hal Spencer	
2018	Fahrenheit 451	Captain Beatty	
2018	What They Had	Nicky Everhardt	Also executive producer
2018	State Like Sleep	Edward	
2019	Knives Out	Walt Thrombey	
2020	The Quarry	Chief Moore	Also executive producer
2020	Echo Boomers	Mel Donnelly	
2021	Heart of Champions	Jack Murphy	Also producer
2022	Night's End	Isaac Dees	
2022	Abandoned	Renner	
2022	Bullet Train	White Death	
2022	Amsterdam	Henry Norcross	
2022	A Little White Lie	Shriver	
2023	Eric Larue	—N/a	Director
2023	The Flash	General Zod	
2023	The Bikeriders	Zipco	
2024	A Different Man	Himself	Cameo
2024	The End	Father	
2025	Nuremberg	Robert H. Jackson	
2026	Buddy	Willie (voice)	
2026	Bulls	Allistar Whitman	
2026	Mr. Irrelevant †	Bill Parcells	Post-production
TBA	King Snake †		Post-production
TBA	Dinner with Audrey †	Billy Wilder	Post-production

Key
†	Denotes films that have not yet been released

=== Television ===
Year	Title	Role	Notes
1992	Overexposed	Young Man	Television film
1992	Angel Street	Patrick Mulligan	Television film
1998, 1999	Early Edition	Merle / Mr. Andrews	2 episodes
1999	Turks	Man #1	Episode: "Pilot"
2005	Law & Order: Special Victims Unit	Avery Shaw	Episode: "Quarry"
2009	Delocated	Mark	Episode: "Sick of It!"
2010–2014	Boardwalk Empire	Nelson Van Alden/George Mueller	35 episodes
2017–2020	At Home with Amy Sedaris	Various	3 episodes
2018	Waco	Gary Noesner	6 episodes; also executive producer
2018	The Little Drummer Girl	Martin Kurtz	6 episodes
2018	Our Cartoon President	Narrator (voice)	Episode: "Election Special 2018"
2018	Room 104	Nathan	Episode: "Swipe Right"
2021	Nine Perfect Strangers	Napoleon Marconi	8 episodes
2022	Little Demon	Unshaven Man (voice)	6 episodes
2022–2023	George & Tammy	George Jones	6 episodes
2023	Waco: The Aftermath	Gary Noesner	5 episodes; also executive producer
2025	Death by Lightning	James A. Garfield	4 episodes

=== Theater ===
Year	Title	Role	Company	Notes
1991	Loving Little Egypt	Humberhill	Griffin Theatre Company	
1992	Fun and Nobody	Denny	Next Theatre Company	
1993–1994	Killer Joe	Chris Smith	Next Theatre Company, EFF	
1995	Victims of Duty	The Detective	A Red Orchid Theatre	
1996	Bug	Peter Evans	Gate Theatre	
1998	Killer Joe	Chris Smith	SoHo Playhouse	
1999	The Killer	Berenger	A Red Orchid Theatre	
1999	The Idiot	Parfyon Rogozhin	Lookingglass Theatre	
2001	Bug	Peter Evans	A Red Orchid Theatre	
2002	Finer Noble Gases	Lynch	Actors Theatre of Louisville	
2004–2005	Bug	Peter Evans	Barrow Street Theatre	
2005	Gagarin Way	Eddie	A Red Orchid Theatre	
2006	The Pillowman	Michal	Steppenwolf Theatre Company	
2006	Hunger and Thirst	Director	A Red Orchid Theatre	
2006	Grace	Sam	Northlight Theatre	
2007	Lady	Kenny	Northlight Theatre	
2008	The Little Flower of East Orange	Danny	The Public Theater	
2008	The Metal Children	Tobin Falmouth	Vineyard Theatre	
2008	Lady	Kenny	Rattlestick Playwrights Theater	
2009	Mistakes Were Made	Felix Artifex	A Red Orchid Theatre	
2010	Our Town	Stage Manager	Barrow Street Theatre	
2010–2011	Mistakes Were Made	Felix Artifex	Barrow Street Theatre	
2012	Uncle Vanya	Mikhail Lvovich Astrov	Soho Repertory Theatre	
2012–2013	Grace	Sam	Cort Theatre	
2013	Simpatico	Lyle Carter	A Red Orchid Theatre	
2014	The Killer	Berenger	Theatre for a New Audience	
2015	Pilgrim's Progress	Jim McKee	A Red Orchid Theatre	
2016	Long Day's Journey into Night	James Tyrone Jr.	American Airlines Theatre	
2017	Simpatico	Lyle Carter	McCarter Theatre Center	
2018	Traitor	—N/a	A Red Orchid Theatre	As director
2018	Victims of Duty	The Detective	A Red Orchid Theatre	
2019	Frankie and Johnny in the Clair de Lune	Johnny	Broadhurst Theatre	
2022–2023	Des Moines	Father Michael	Theatre for a New Audience	
2023	Waiting for Godot	Estragon	Theatre for a New Audience	
2024	Turret	Green	A Red Orchid Theatre	
2025	A Moon for the Misbegotten	James Tyrone Jr.	Almeida Theatre	

== Awards and nominations ==
The Chicago City Council passed a resolution designating August 7, 2023, as "National Michael Shannon Day" in Chicago.

== See also ==
- List of actors with Academy Award nominations
