= Shannon Cochran =

American actress

- Born: 1958 or 1959 (age 67–68)
- Years active: 1984–present

Shannon Elaine Cochran (born 1958 or 1959) is an American actress. While she has numerous credits to her name, she is particularly recognizable as having played the mysterious Anna Morgan in the 2002 horror film The Ring.

== Early years ==
Cochran is the daughter of Mr. and Mrs. James B. Cochran. She graduated from Page High School in Greensboro, North Carolina. She attended Wake Forest University but left to go into acting. She graduated from the Cincinnati Conservatory of Music in 1982.

== Career ==
Cochran has performed in multiple theatres in the US and Europe. She began acting professionally in theaters in Cincinnati and Memphis, and in 1984 she toured with a revue whose stops included the Bahamas, Boston, California, and Miami. Her Broadway credits include August: Osage County (2009), Cabaret (2016), and Harry Potter and the Cursed Child (2019).

She played Pam Beesly's mother in The Office episode "Sexual Harassment" (later replaced by Linda Purl).

== Personal life ==
Cochran married actor Michael Canavan.

== Filmography ==
Year	Title	Role	Notes
1992	The Babe	Flapper	
1992	Seinfeld	Sheila	Episode: "The Parking Space"
1992	Empty Nest	Stacy	Episode: "It's Not Easy Being Green"
1993	L.A. Law	D.D.A. Ms. Schiff	Episode: "F.O.B."
1993–1994	NYPD Blue	Lois Snyder	4 episodes
1994	The Untouchables		Episode: "The Last Gauntlet"
1994	Star Trek: The Next Generation	Kalita	Episode: "Preemptive Strike"
1994	The Haunting of Seacliff Inn	Sheriff Tomizack	TV movie
1994	Star Trek: Deep Space Nine	Kalita / Sirella	2 episodes
1995	Full House	Morgan	Episode: "Michelle Rides Again"
1997	Chicago Hope	Linda Kellerd	Episode: "Colonel of Truth"
1997	Saved by the Bell: The New Class	Ms. Richards	Episode: "Her Brother's Keeper"
1998	ER	Mrs. Klingman	Episode: "Masquerade"
1999	Witness Protection	Psychologist	TV movie
2000	Any Day Now		Episode: "It's a Mother-Daughter Thing"
2000	Grosse Pointe	Julie's Mom	Episode: "Satisfaction"
2001	Touched by an Angel	Val	Episode: "I Am an Angel"
2001	Gilmore Girls	Meena	Episode: "Like Mother, Like Daughter"
2002	The Ring	Anna Morgan	
2002	Star Trek: Nemesis	Senator Tal'aura	
2003	Frasier	Bank Manager	Episode: "Roe to Perdition"
2003	Charlie Lawrence	Newscaster	Episode: "A Vote of Confidence"
2004	Law & Order: Special Victims Unit	Cindy Cramer / Sarah	Episode: "Charisma"
2005	Without a Trace	Dr. Witmer	Episode: "Volcano"
2005	The Office	Helene Beesly	Episode: "Sexual Harassment"
2006	Grey's Anatomy	Mary Singleton	Episode: "Begin the Begin"
2006	The Substance of Things Hoped For	Dr. Drury	
2006	The Bold and the Beautiful	Prosecutor Gilmore	2 episodes
2006	Close to Home	Meredith	Episode: "Legacy"
2007	The Unit	Capt. Lisa	Episode: "In Loco Parentis"
2009	Numbers	Doctor Iverson	Episode: "The Fifth Man"
2010	Fringe	Patricia Van Horn	Episode: "Do Shapeshifters Dream of Electric Sheep?"
2011	Off the Map	Marian Cooper	Episode: "It's a Leaf"
2011	The Perfect Family	Mary Donovan	
2011	Desperate Housewives	Meg Butler	Episode: "The Lies Ill-Concealed"
2012–2013	Scandal	Attorney General Susan Sawyer	3 episodes
2014	NCIS	Mallory Linn	Episode: "Bulletproof"
2015	NCIS: Los Angeles	Dr. Susan Rathburn	Episode: "Citadel"
2016	Modern Family	Nancy Decker	Episode: "Grab It"
2019	Captive State	Cathy Mulligan	
2025	Ballard	Paula Hopkinson	Episode: "Beneath the Surface"
2025	The Hand That Rocks the Cradle	Rosanna	
