= Clarkston (play) =

Play written by Samuel D. Hunter

- Original language: English
- Written by: Samuel D. Hunter
- Characters: Jake; Chris; Trisha
- Setting: Clarkston, Washington

Premiere
- Date: December 3, 2015
- Place: Dallas Theater Center

Clarkston is a 90-minute, one-act play written by Samuel D. Hunter, that won the 2015 Edgerton Foundation New Play Award. The play is set in Clarkston, Washington, with a focus on American narratives of isolation, mortality and human connection against the backdrop of a Costco warehouse. The play was crafted as a companion piece to Lewiston, with both plays examining descendants of Lewis and Clark grappling with the remains of American frontier spirit.

The play premiered at the Dallas Theater Center in December 2015. A joint production with Lewiston premiered Off-Broadway at the Rattlesticks Playwrights Theater in 2018, earning a Clive Barnes Award for Edmund Donovan (playing Jake), and a Drama Desk Award for Outstanding Play nomination. In 2025, Trafalgar Theater hosted the West End premiere, featuring Joe Locke as Jake.

== Synopsis ==
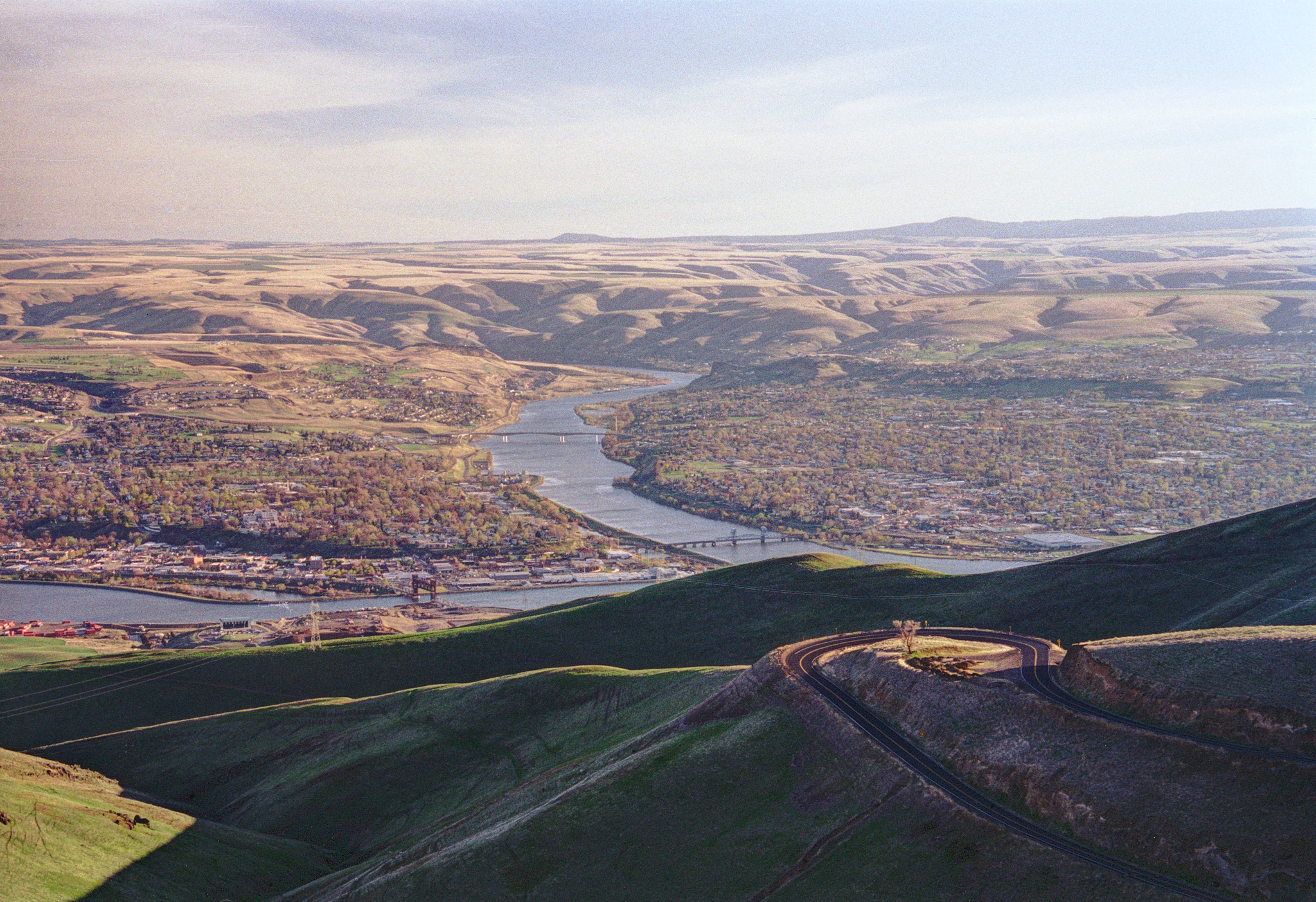
View of Lewiston and Clarkston (WA), from the north

Jake ends up in Clarkston while retracing the voyage of his distant relative William Clark. While working night shifts at Costco, Jake meets Chris, who is saving up to leave Clarkston for a writing workshop, but whose life is shadowed by a troubled mother, Trisha.

== Production history ==
=== Origins ===
Hunter stated that the play was partly inspired by a trip taken with his husband to northern Idaho. While driving, his "husband jokingly said, 'you should write a play called 'Lewiston' and a play called 'Clarkston.' And immediately I thought it was such a great idea, writing two plays set in these two towns, sort of unremarkable western towns, but with the backdrop of the Lewis and Clark journey looming over them." The play first received staged readings at Boise Contemporary Theater's 5X5 Reading Series in April 2015.

=== Dallas Theater Center (2015) ===
The play had its world premiere at the Dallas Theater Center's Wyly Theatre on December 3, 2015, running through the end of January 2016. The production was directed by Davis McCallum, who had also worked on half a dozen other productions with Hunter, including The Whale and A Bright New Boise.

The production garnered a number of positive reviews, and some more negative reviews. DMagazine praised the "wonderful, natural performances" from the actors, concluding that the play "captures the mundane drama of life and how those around us are going through things we might never suspect or understand, how we are all explorers of our own futures, much like Lewis and Clark's exploration of the American West. It doesn't matter if others have come before you on your pathway. It only matters that you're brave enough to make the journey."

=== Off-Broadway (2018) ===
In 2018, the Rattlestick Playwrights Theater, an Off-Broadway theater in New York City, hosted a back-to-back production of both Lewiston and Clarkston, with an intermission meal break. McCallum once again directed the production, which had an extended run from October 10-December 16.

The production received positive reviews. It was a New York Times Critic's Pick, with reviewer Jesse Green noting a "plot both surprising and inevitable" with a "perfect ending".

=== West Coast (2024) ===
The play had its West Coast premiere at the Atwater Village Theater on September 11, 2024, running until October 21. Chris Fields directed the production, with a minimalist design that incorporated Stephen Stills' "4+20".

=== West End (2025) ===
In 2025, the play was produced at Trafalgar Theater, in London's West End, with direction by Jack Serio. The production was also Joe Locke's West End debut. In a 9-week limited engagement, the play ran from September 17 to November 22.

An average of graded reviews collected by LoveLondonCulture was 3.35 stars, suggesting generally mixed to positive reviews. This ranged from 2 stars given by The Standard, which critiqued how "generic" the play was, to The Telegraph's 4 stars noting "the funny and touching" portrayal by Locke, and City AM's 5 stars praising the play as "brimming with vital questions about happiness and identity."

=== Other productions ===
- Boise Contemporary Theater (February–March 2019).
- Bridge Street Theatre, Catskill, NY (April–May 2022). Directed by Daniel Elihu Kramer.
- Penobscot Theatre Company, Bangor, ME (September–October 2022). Directed by Jonathan Berry.

== Cast and characters ==
| | World Premiere | Off-Broadway Premiere | West Coast Premiere | West End Premiere |
| | Dallas Theater Company | Rattlesticks Playwrights Theater | Atwater Village Theater | Trafalgar Theater |
| | 2015 | 2018 | 2024 | 2025 |
|---|---|---|---|---|
| Jake | Taylor Trensch | Noah Robbins | Michael Sturgis | Joe Locke |
| Chris | Sam Lilija | Edmund Donovan | Sean Luc Rogers | Ruaridh Mollica |
| Trisha | Heidi Armbruster | Heidi Armbruster | Tasha Ames | Sophie Melville |

== Awards ==
=== Pre-premiere ===
| Year | Award | Category | Nominee | Result | Ref. |
|---|---|---|---|---|---|
| 2015 | Edgerton Foundation | New Play Award | Samuel D. Hunter | Won | |

=== 2018 Off-Broadway Production ===
| Year | Award | Category | Nominee | Result | Ref. |
|---|---|---|---|---|---|
| 2019 | Clive Barnes Award | Excellence in Theater | Edmund Donovan | Won | |
| 2019 | Drama Desk Award | Outstanding Play | | Nominated | |
| 2019 | Drama Desk Award | Outstanding Actor in a Play | Edmund Donovan | Nominated | |
| 2019 | Outer Critics Circle Award | Outstanding New Off-Broadway Play | | Nominated | |
| 2019 | Outer Critics Circle Award | Outstanding Lighting Design (Play or Musical) | Stacey Derosier | Nominated | |

=== 2025 West End Production ===
| Year | Award | Category | Nominee | Result | Ref. |
|---|---|---|---|---|---|
| 2025 | What'sOnStage Award | Best New Play | | Nominated | |
| 2025 | What'sOnStage Award | Best Performer in a Play | Joe Locke | Nominated | |
| 2025 | What'sOnStage Award | Best Supporting Performer in a Play | Sophie Melville | Nominated | |
| 2025 | What'sOnStage Award | Best Professional Debut | Ruaridh Mollica | Nominated | |

== See also ==
- Clarkston, Washington
- Samuel D. Hunter
- Joe Locke
