= Noah Robbins =

American actor (born 1990)

- Robbins in 2026
- Born: October 6, 1990 (age 36); Potomac, Maryland, U.S.
- Education: Columbia University (BA)
- Years active: 2009–present

Noah Robbins (born October 6, 1990) is an American actor. He is known for his roles in Fly Me to the Moon, Unbreakable Kimmy Schmidt, Younger, and his work on Broadway.

== Broadway and Off-Broadway ==
Noah Robbins made his Broadway and professional debut as Eugene in Neil Simon’s Brighton Beach Memoirs for which he received an Outer Critics Circle nomination, and appeared in the Broadway revival of Tom Stoppard’s Arcadia. His Broadway credits also include Dill in Aaron Sorkin’s To Kill A Mockingbird, and Charlie in Ossie Davis’s Purlie Victorious.

Off-Broadway, he was seen in Ethan Coen’s Let’s Love! at Atlantic Theater, Samuel D. Hunter’s Lewiston/Clarkston at Rattlestick Playwrights Theater, Athol Fugard’s “Master Harold”...And The Boys at Signature Theater, and Simon Stephens’s Punk Rock at MCC Theater. He starred in Hamish Linklater’s The Vandal at the Flea Theater, and played the title character in Nathan Englander’s The Twenty-Seventh Man at the Public Theater. His off-Broadway debut was in Jonathan Tolins’s Secrets of the Trade at Primary Stages for which he received a Clive Barnes Award nomination.

== Film and Television ==
His film credits include Tom McCarthy’s The Statement, Steven Spielberg’s Disclosure Day, Greg Berlanti’s Fly Me to the Moon, Aaron Sorkin’s The Trial of the Chicago 7 (SAG Award), The Assistant, Leo, Miss Sloane, The Week Of, Indignation, Set It Up, Aardvark, Cruise, Fatal Crossing, and The Outcasts.

On TV, he’s appeared as Eugene in Grease: Live, Masters of Sex, Unbreakable Kimmy Schmidt, Up Here, Younger, Orange Is the New Black, Gotham, Awkwafina Is Nora from Queens, The Good Wife, Billions, Evil, The Blacklist, Blue Bloods, and The Slap. He can be seen prominently in the TV series Forever on Amazon, opposite Maya Rudolph and Fred Armisen.

== Background ==
Robbins is a native of Washington, D.C., and graduated from Georgetown Day School in 2009. He graduated Phi Beta Kappa and magna cum laude from Columbia University, where he majored in Philosophy. His brother, Jeremy Robbins, is a screenwriter.

== Filmography ==
=== Film ===
Year	Title	Role	Notes
2016	Indignation	Marty Ziegler	
2016	Miss Sloane	Franklin	
2017	The Outcasts	Martin Vimmel	
2017	Aardvark	Daniel	
2018	Cruise	Anthony Panagopoulos	
2018	The Week Of	Noah	
2018	Set It Up	Intern Bo	
2019	Villains	Nick	
2019	The Assistant	Male Assistant 1	
2020	The Trial of the Chicago 7	Lee Weiner	
2023	Leo	Waiter / Kiosk Attendant (voices)	
2024	Fly Me to the Moon	Don Harper	
2026	Disclosure Day	Agent Munsey	
2026	A Statement	Robert Cunningham	

=== Television ===
Year	Title	Role	Notes
2014	NBC's The Slap	Lee	Episode: "Harry"
2015	Orange Is the New Black	Samuel	Episode: "Where My Dreidel At"
2015	Masters of Sex	Henry Johnson	Episode: "Parliament of Owls"
2015	Gotham	Evan Pike	Episode: "Scarification"
2015	The Good Wife	Josh Shelby	Episode: "Discovery"
2015	LFE	Kruze	Television film
2016	Grease: Live	Eugene Felsnick	Television film
2016	You Made It Worse	Ryan	Episode: "Bake, Bake, Bake, Bake It Off"
2016	Younger	Bryce Reiger	4 episodes
2017	Blue Bloods	Richie Turner	Episode: "A Deep Blue Goodbye"
2017–2019	Unbreakable Kimmy Schmidt	Zach	7 episodes
2018	Forever	Mark Erickson	4 episodes
2019	Evil	Sebastian Lewin	3 episodes
2020–2021	Billions	Merle Howard	2 episodes
2021	The Blacklist	William Benedict	Episode: "Captain Kidd (No. 96)"
2023	Awkwafina Is Nora from Queens	Jaxon	Episode: "Bad Grandma"

=== Theatre ===
Year	Title	Role	Playwright	Venue
2009	Brighton Beach Memoirs	Young Eugene Morris Jerome	Neil Simon	Nederlander Theatre, Broadway
2011	Arcadia	Gus Coverly / Augustus Coverly	Tom Stoppard	Ethel Barrymore Theatre, Broadway
2018	Clarkston	Jake	Samuel D. Hunter	Rattlesticks Playwrights Theater, Off Broadway
2021	To Kill a Mockingbird	Dill Harris	Aaron Sorkin	Shubert Theatre, Broadway
2023	Purlie Victorious	Charlie Cotchipee	Ossie Davis	Music Box Theatre, Broadway
