= Tim Cummings =

American actor and author

- Born: 1973 (age 52–53); Port Jefferson, New York

Tim Cummings (born 1973) is an American actor and author.

== Early life ==
Timothy P Cummings was born in Port Jefferson, New York, to James A. and Rosemarie Cummings. He has four elder siblings and one half-sibling. His father was a Lieutenant with the NYFD (Engine 82, Ladder 31) in the South Bronx for thirty years.

=== Education ===
Cummings graduated from Comsewogue High School, where he appeared in Brighton Beach Memoirs, Twelve Angry Men, Babes in Arms, You're A Good Man Charlie Brown and Bye Bye Birdie. He then attended New York University's Tisch School of the Arts, where he received a BFA. While at NYU, he studied at The Stella Adler Conservatory and The Experimental Theater Wing. He performed in productions of The White Album Project, Fornes's The Conduct of Life, Brecht's Threepenny Opera, Shakespeare's Titus Andronicus, Shaw's Man & Superman, Durang's Naomi In The Living Room and Maeterlink's The Intruder.

Cummings received his MFA in Creative Writing (Writing for Young People) from Antioch University Los Angeles, in June 2018. He studied under the tutelage of lauded authors Francesca Lia Block, Kerry Madden, and Gayle Brandeis.

== Acting career ==
After graduating from NYU, Cummings began performing as a company member in two of New York City's downtown theater & dance companies, Big Dance Theater and The Builders Association, with whom he toured extensively, performing in festivals across US, the UK, and Europe.

He later performed with The Flea Theater, in Mac Wellman's Sincerity Forever, Cleveland, and Three Americanisms, as well as the melodrama Billy the Kid written by Walter Woods in 1903.

He directed an original black comedy by Kenny Finkle, Transatlantica. He was an understudy in the Off-Broadway play The Guys and in the Broadway revival of Frankie and Johnny in the Clair de Lune.

Cummings subsequently relocated to Los Angeles to work in television and film in addition to theatre, where he is best known for playing Ned Weeks in Larry Kramer's The Normal Heart, Patsy in The New Electric Ballroom by Enda Walsh, Mitch in Reunion at South Coast Repertory, Mitchell in Daniel's Husband at The Fountain Theatre, and Arnold in Samuel D. Hunter's Grangeville at The Ruskin Group Theatre in Santa Monica, a performance that the head theatre critic of the Los Angeles Times hailed as "a masterclass in acting."

Cummings served as Associate Director of the Youth Program at The Ojai Playwrights Conference from 2011 to 2017.

== Career in writing ==
- In summer 2025, Cummings' follow-up young-adult novel, The Lightning People Play, was published by Black Rose Writing. The story was inspired by Cummings' own experience losing an epileptic sibling to a grand-mal seizure in 1997, and by his own extensive background in theatre.
- In 2023, Cummings' debut novel, Alice the Cat, was published by Fitzroy Books, the Young Adult & Middle-grade imprint of Regal House Publishing The story was inspired by Cummings' own experience losing his mother to cancer when he was a teenager.
- In 2019, Cummings' essay, You Have Changed Me Forever, won lauded literary magazine Critical Read's Origins essay contest.
- In 2018, he had numerous works (interviews, reviews, short stories, essays, poetry,) accepted for publications at several prominent literary journals and magazines: Lunch Ticket, Larb, From Whispers to Roars, Meow Meow Pow Pow, F(r)iction, and Critical Read.
- In 2017 he released an eclectic collection of stories, poetry, and dramatic writings, called Anthology: The Ojai Playwrights Conference Youth Workshop 2006-2016. It was written by several participants of The Ojai Playwrights Conference Youth Workshop. He compiled and edited the collection in conjunction with his Master of Fine Arts program at Antioch University Los Angeles.
- The summer of 2011 saw the release of a unique collection called Orphans, which incorporates short stories, poetry, screenplays, plays, a film treatment.
- He wrote the full-length play, Bully, which explores the epidemic of teens committing suicide for being bullied.
- He is a regular contributor at Los Angeles Review of Books where he writes reviews, interviews, and profiles.

== Awards and nominations ==
Year	Award	Category	Result
2000	Obie Award	Jet Lag w/ The Builders Association (Marianne Weems)	Won (Special Citation)
2000	Obie Award	For Big Dance Theater (Annie-B Parson)	Won (Special Citation)
2005	LA Weekly Theater Awards	Best Supporting Actor for Burn This	Nominated
2007	Garland Awards	Best Supporting Actor for The Pursuit of Happiness at Laguna Playhouse	Nominated
2011	Ovation Awards	Best Season (including Roddy Doyle's War & Enda Walsh's The Walworth Farce) at Theatre Banshee	Nominated
2012	LA Weekly Theater Awards	Best Comedy Ensemble for The Walworth Farce	Nominated
2012	LA Weekly Theater Awards	Best Revival for Camino Real	Nominated
2013	Los Angeles Drama Critics Circle	Best Ensemble for Enda Walsh's The New Electric Ballroom	Won
2013	LA Weekly Theater Awards	Best Supporting Actor for The New Electric Ballroom	Won
2014	Broadway World Awards	Best Lead Actor for The Normal Heart at The Fountain Theatre	Won
2014	LA Weekly Theater Awards	Best Revival Production for The Normal Heart	Nominated
2014	LA Weekly Theater Awards	Best Lead Actor for The Normal Heart	Nominated
2014	Ovation Awards	Best Season (including The Normal Heart) at The Fountain Theatre	Won
2014	Los Angeles Drama Critics Circle	Best Lead Actor for The Normal Heart at The Fountain Theatre	Won
2015	StageSceneLA Awards	Performance of the Year for The Woodsman	Won
2016	SAGE Awards (ArtsInLA)	Best Lead Actor for Need To Know	Won
2017	Ovation Awards	Best Production for The House In Scarsdale: A Memoir for the Stage	Nominated
2017	SAGE Awards (ArtsInLA)	Best Lead Actor for The House In Scarsdale: A Memoir for the Stage	Won
2018	Los Angeles Drama Critics Circle	Best Lead Actor for The House In Scarsdale: A Memoir for the Stage	Won
2019	Critical Read Literary Magazine	Origins essay contest for You Have Changed Me Forever	Won
2019	Pushcart Prize	For You Have Changed Me Forever	Nominated
2019	Ticket Holders LA Awards	Best Performance in a Play for Daniel's Husband	Won
2019	Ovation Awards	Best Lead Actor for Daniel's Husband	Nominated
2024	American Book Fest	Best Book Awards: Finalist for Fiction Young Adult for "Alice the Cat"	Nominated
2024	Feathered Quill Book Awards	Bronze Medal for Young Adult Fiction for "Alice the Cat"	Won
2024	National Indie Excellence Awards	Finalist for Teen Fiction for "Alice the Cat"	Nominated
2026	Feathered Quill Book Awards	Gold Medal / 1st Place for Teen Fiction for "The Lightning People Play"	Won
2026	Nautilus Book Awards	Silver Medal / 2nd Place, Young Adult Fiction 13-18 for "The Lightning People Play"	Won

== Work ==
=== Film ===
- Dead Serious
- Bind
- Can You Ever Forgive Me?
- Kensho at the Bedfellow
- Spirited
- Something Strange
- Presence
- Sunken Warrior
- Exit Interview
- The Box
- Making 'Three Americanisms'
- The Guys
- Morning Fall
- The Gas Heart

=== Television ===
- High Potential
- Criminal Minds
- GRIMM
- My Two Fans
- Rosewood

=== Stage ===
2020–2029

- Grangeville
- Octopus's Garden
- White Rabbit Red Rabbit

2010–2019

- Daniel's Husband
- Cal In Camo
- The House in Scarsdale: A Memoir for the Stage
- Need To Know
- 2015 Ojai Playwrights Conference
- The Woodsman
- 2014 Ojai Playwrights Conference
- Nine Hours (Young Playwrights Festival at Blank Theatre Company)
- Reunion
- Skylight Theatre's SALUTE to Terrence McNally
- The Normal Heart
- 2013 Ojai Playwrights Conference
- 2013 Pacific Playwrights Festival
- The Phantom Tollbooth
- The Firebird (with the LA Phil)
- Eurydice (Ruhl play)
- 2012 Ojai Playwrights Conference
- The Grapes of Wrath
- The New Electric Ballroom
- Winterfest—47 Plays in 18 Days (Producer/Performer/Playwright)
- The Guys (10-year Anniversary performances)
- 2011 Ojai Playwrights Conference
- The Walworth Farce
- Camino Real
- War
- The Winter's Tale
- Magic Framework
- The Soltanoff/Findlay Wkshp

2000–2009

- Slasher
- Hamlet
- Tartuffe
- The Diary of a Teenage Girl
- The Last Schwartz
- The Pursuit of Happiness
- The Guys (5-year Anniversary performances)
- The Outsiders Presents IV
- The Handlers
- Madelyn Kent's Peninsula
- Constantly Distracted (Director)
- "IV"
- Lanford Wilson's Burn This
- The Moonlight Sonata
- Patrick Marber's Closer (play)
- Host
- The Seagull
- Madelyn Kent's SHUFU: Iraqi Interview
- Mac Wellman's Three Americanisms
- The Homecoming
- Frankie and Johnny in the Clair de Lune
- Transatlantica
- The Guys
- Billy the Kid
- No Mother to Guide Her
- Mac Wellman's Cleveland
- Mac Wellman's Sincerity Forever
- Centaur Battle of San Jacinto

1990–1999

- Jet Lag (1998-2000)
- Park
- Girl Gone
- A Simple Heart
- The Gas Heart
- Sugar Down Billie Hoak
- The Fairground Booth
- 20/21
- Distortion Taco
- Anus Mundi
- Mississippi Nude
- Leopold and Loeb are Dead Now
- The White Album Project
- The Conduct of Life
- The Threepenny Opera
- Terrence McNally's Andre's Mother
- Naomi in the Living Room
- Man and Superman
- Titus Andronicus
- Geography of a Horse Dreamer
- Brecht's Fear and Misery of the Third Reich
- Intruder (play)
- West Side Story
- Brighton Beach Memoirs

1985–1989

- Bye Bye Birdie
- The Fantasticks
- Guys & Dolls
- Sweet Charity
- Twelve Angry Men
- Cinderella
- Grease
- Fiddler on the Roof
- Babes in Arms
- Free to Be You and Me
- The Sound of Music
- Snoopy! The Musical
- Bye Bye Birdie
- Alice in Wonderland
- You're a Good Man Charlie Brown
- Frankly, Franklin
