= Lewiston (play) =

Play written by Samuel D. Hunter

- Original language: English
- Written by: Samuel D. Hunter
- Characters: Alice; Connor; Marnie
- Setting: Lewiston, Idaho

Premiere
- Date: April 6, 2016
- Place: Long Wharf Theater; New Haven, Connecticut

Lewiston is a one-act play written by Samuel D. Hunter, that premiered at Long Wharf Theater in 2016. The play is set in Lewiston, Idaho with a focus on economic decline, family trauma, and the importance of land ownership.

The play was crafted as a companion piece to Clarkston, with both plays examining descendants of Lewis and Clark grappling with the remains of American frontier spirit. A joint production with Lewiston premiered Off-Broadway at the Rattlesticks Playwrights Theater in 2018 earning a Drama Desk Award for Outstanding Play nomination.

== Plot ==
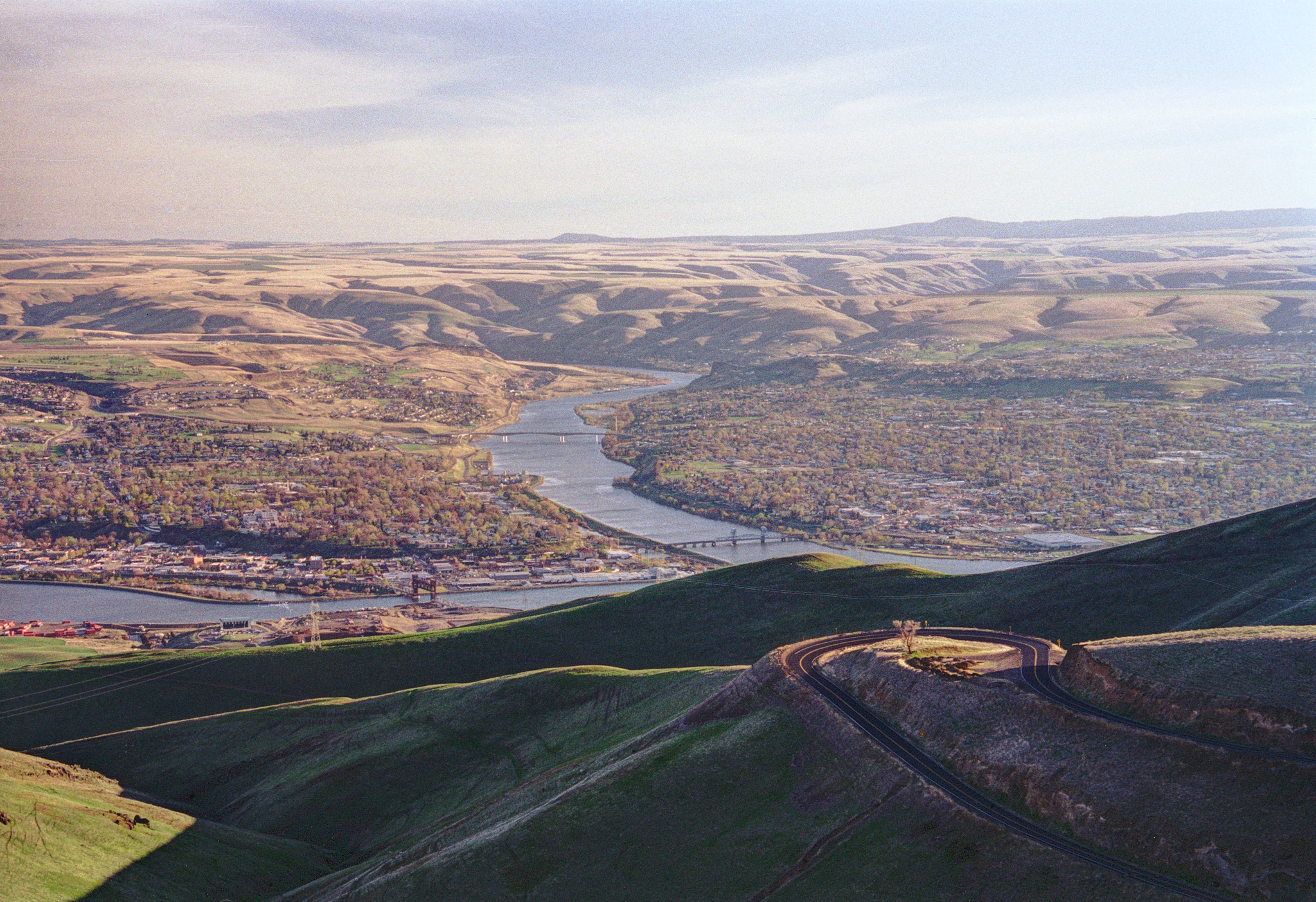
View of Lewiston and Clarkston (WA), from the north

Alice, an aging descendant of Meriwether Lewis, operates a roadside fireworks stand in Lewiston, Idaho with her younger platonic roommate Connor. As real estate developers purchase the surrounding land, they have been promised a condo in the new development. Their routine is disrupted when Marnie, Alice's 24-year-old granddaughter whom she hasn't seen in 15 years, arrives with a proposal to buy the last remaining parcel of family land to preserve their legacy. Marnie, who has found success running an urban farm in Seattle, pitches a tent next to the stand and refuses to leave until she gets what she wants.

The play explores the complex relationship between Alice and Marnie, who are both haunted by the suicide of Marnie's mother. Throughout the play, Marnie listens to audiocassette diaries left by her mother, seeking to understand the reasons for her death. Connor serves as an awkward mediator between the two strong-willed women.

== Production history ==
=== Origins ===
Hunter stated that the play was partly inspired by a trip taken with his husband to northern Idaho. While driving, his "husband jokingly said, 'you should write a play called 'Lewiston' and a play called 'Clarkston.' And immediately I thought it was such a great idea, writing two plays set in these two towns, sort of unremarkable western towns, but with the backdrop of the Lewis and Clark journey looming over them."

The play first received staged readings at Boise Contemporary Theater's 5X5 Reading Series in April 2015, with "Clarkston" following later that month.

=== World Premiere at Long Wharf Theater (2016) ===
Lewiston had its world premiere at Long Wharf Theatre in New Haven, Connecticut, running from April 6 to May 1, 2016. The production was directed by Eric Ting. The creative team included Wilson Chin (set design), Paloma Young (costume design), Matthew Richards (lighting design), and Brandon Wolcott (sound design).

=== Off-Broadway (2018) ===
In 2018, the Rattlestick Playwrights Theater, an Off-Broadway theater in New York City, hosted a back-to-back production of both Lewiston and Clarkston, with an intermission meal break. McCallum once again directed the production, which had an extended run from October 10-December 16.

The production received positive reviews. It was a New York Times Critic's Pick, with reviewer Jesse Green noting a "plot both surprising and inevitable" with a "perfect ending".

=== Other productions ===
- Boise Contemporary Theater (February–March 2019).
- Forward Theater Company, Madison, Wisconsin (2021) – Digital theatrical presentation during COVID-19
- Bridge Street Theatre, Catskill, New York (2021)

== Cast and characters ==
| | World Premiere | Off-Broadway Premiere |
| | Long Whard Theater | Rattlesticks Playwrights Theater |
| | 2016 | 2018 |
|---|---|---|
| Alice | Randy Danson | Kristin Griffith |
| Connor | Martin Moran | Arnie Burton |
| Marnie | Arielle Goldman | Leah Karpel |
| Female Voice | Lucy Owen | Heidi Armbruster |

== Nominations for Awards ==
=== 2018 Off-Broadway Production ===
| Year | Award | Category | Nominee | Result | Ref. |
|---|---|---|---|---|---|
| 2019 | Drama Desk Award | Outstanding Play | Lewiston/Clarkston | Nominated | |
| 2019 | Drama Desk Award | Outstanding Featured Actor in a Play | Arnie Burton | Nominated | |
| 2019 | Outer Critics Circle Award | Outstanding New Off-Broadway Play | Lewiston/Clarkston | Nominated | |
| 2019 | Outer Critics Circle Award | Outstanding Lighting Design (Play or Musical) | Stacey Derosier | Nominated | |

== See also ==
- Clarkston, Washington
- Samuel D. Hunter
- Lewis and Clark Expedition
