= Bill Pankow =

American film editor (born 1952)

- Born: July 29, 1952 (age 74); New York City, New York, U.S.
- Education: Fordham University; NYU Tisch School of the Arts
- Occupation: Film editor

William Pankow (born July 29, 1952) is an American film editor, best known for his work with director Brian De Palma.

== Life and career ==
Pankow was born in New York City in 1952. He studied filmmaking at Fordham University and New York University.

After working at a commercial production company, Pankow began working in feature films as an assistant to editor Gerald B. Greenberg. He later succeeded Greenberg's as director Brian De Palma's regular editor, editing ten of his film beginning with 1984's Body Double. He has also worked with directors like Abel Ferrara, Jean-François Richet, Paul Schrader, Tsui Hark, and Ringo Lam.

Pankow is a member of the American Cinema Editors, and a former Adjunct Professor at New York University and Maine Media Workshops.

== Filmography ==
=== Film ===
Year	Film	Director	Notes
1980	Dressed to Kill	Brian De Palma	Associate editor
1982	Still of the Night	Robert Benton	
1983	Scarface	Brian De Palma	Associate editor
1984	Body Double	Brian De Palma	
1985	Savage Dawn	Simon Nuchtern	Associate editor
1986	Wise Guys	Brian De Palma	Associate editor
1987	The Untouchables	Brian De Palma	
1989	Parents	Bob Balaban	
1989	Casualties of War	Brian De Palma	
1990	The Comfort of Strangers	Paul Schrader	
1990	The Bonfire of the Vanities	Brian De Palma	
1992	Whispers in the Dark	Christopher Crowe	
1993	Naked in New York	Daniel Algrant	
1993	Carlito's Way	Brian De Palma	
1995	Money Train	Joseph Ruben	
1995	Let It Be Me	Eleanor Bergstein	
1995	Sweet Nothing	Gary Winick	Additional editor
1996	The Funeral	Abel Ferrara	
1996	Maximum Risk	Ringo Lam	
1997	Double Team	Tsui Hark	
1998	The Tic Code	Gary Winick	
1998	Snake Eyes	Brian De Palma	
2000	Once in the Life	Laurence Fishburne	
2001	'R Xmas	Abel Ferrara	
2002	Femme Fatale	Brian De Palma	
2002	Drumline	Charles Stone III	
2002	Paid in Full	Charles Stone III	
2004	Mr. 3000	Charles Stone III	
2005	Assault on Precinct 13	Jean-François Richet	
2006	The Black Dahlia	Brian De Palma	
2007	Redacted	Brian De Palma	
2007	Feel the Noise	Alejandro Chomski	
2008	Mesrine	Jean-François Richet	
2010	Letters to Juliet	Gary Winick	
2011	Trespass	Joel Schumacher	
2012	Greetings from Tim Buckley	Daniel Algrant	
2013	The East	Zal Batmanglij	
2013	The Harvest	John McNaughton	
2014	Let's Be Cops	Luke Greenfield	
2015	Max	Boaz Yakin	
2015	American Ultra	Nima Nourizadeh	
2017	Gifted	Marc Webb	
2019	Domino	Brian De Palma	
2021	This Is the Night	James DeMonaco	

=== Television ===
Year	Title	Notes
1985−86	The Equalizer	3 episodes
1986−88	Tales from the Darkside	8 episodes
1993	TriBeCa	Episode: "The Hopeless Romantic"
2000	The Corner	Miniseries
2003	Undefeated	TV movie
2013	Treme	Episode: "Dippermouth Blues"
2016	Mars	2 episodes

== Awards and nominations ==
Institution	Year	Category	Work	Result
American Cinema Editors	2001	Best Edited Miniseries or Motion Picture for Television	The Corner	Nominated
César Awards	2009	Best Editing	Mesrine	Nominated
Seattle Film Critics Society	2002	Best Film Editing	Femme Fatale	Won
