= Frederick Zollo =

American producer, director (born 1953)

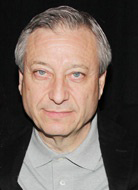
- Born: Frederick M. Zollo; 24 February 1953 (age 72); Woburn, Massachusetts
- Education: Boston University (BA)
- Occupations: Producer; director
- Spouse: Barbara Broccoli (m. 1991, divorced)
- Children: 1

Frederick M. Zollo (born 24 February 1953) is an American producer and director of both film and theatre.

== Selected theatrical productions ==
- Once
- On Golden Pond
- The Farnsworth Invention
- Frozen
- The Goat: or, Who is Sylvia?
- Sex, Drugs, Rock & Roll
- King Hedley II
- Buried Child
- Our Country's Good
- Hurlyburly
- Butley
- Pounding Nails in the Floor with My Forehead
- Caroline, or Change
- Private Lives
- Death and the Maiden
- Chitty Chitty Bang Bang
- Glengarry Glen Ross
- Les Liaisons Dangereuses
- The Basic Training of Pavlo Hummel
- Ma Rainey's Black Bottom
- 'night, Mother
- Angels in America
- A Steady Rain

== Select filmography ==
He was a producer in all films unless otherwise noted.

=== Film ===
Year	Film	Credit	Ref.
1988	Miles from Home		
1988	Mississippi Burning		
1993	The Music of Chance		
1993	Naked in New York		
1994	The Paper		
1994	Quiz Show	Executive producer	
1995	Sex and the Other Man	Executive producer	
1996	Ghosts of Mississippi		
1998	Hurlyburly	Executive producer	
2006	Little Fugitive		
2007	Resurrecting the Champ	Executive producer	
2012	Greetings from Tim Buckley		
2015	Sweet Lorraine	Executive producer	
2018	Trauma is a Time Machine	Executive producer	
2022	Till		

Miscellaneous crew

Year	Film	Role
1985	Key Exchange	Producer: Original play Production consultant
1994	Oleanna	Producer: Original play
2020	Ma Rainey's Black Bottom	Original Broadway producer

As an actor

Year	Film	Role
1988	Mississippi Burning	Reporter

=== Television ===
Year	Title	Credit	Notes
1997	American Experience	Executive producer	Documentary
1997	In the Gloaming	Executive producer	Television film
1999	Lansky	Executive producer	Television film
