= Edmund Donovan =

American actor (born 1990)

- Born: August 24, 1990 (age 36)
- Education: Boston University (BFA); Yale University (MFA)
- Occupation: Actor
- Years active: 2013–present

Edmund Donovan (born August 24, 1990) is an American actor. He made his film debut as Christopher Welling in the romantic drama film Akron (2015), which won a number of awards at various LGBT film festivals.

Donovan won the Drama Desk Award for Outstanding Actor in a Play, Lucille Lortel Award, and Obie Award in 2020 for his role as Joe in Greater Clements by Samuel D. Hunter. He received a Drama Desk Award nomination in 2019 for his role in Lewiston/Clarkston, another play by Hunter. His television credits include Hightown, Betty, High Fidelity, and Orange Is the New Black. In 2021, Donovan played Jason in Second Stage Theatre's production of Lynn Nottage's Clyde's.

== Early life ==
He graduated from Boston University's College of Fine Arts in 2012 with a BFA in acting. In 2017 he received an MFA from the Yale School of Drama.

== Personal life ==
Donovan lives in New York City. He is in a relationship with actress Juliana Canfield.

== Works and credits ==
=== Film ===
Year	Title	Role	Notes
2015	Akron	Christopher	
2015	The Inhabitants	Eric	
2021	Glob Lessons	Doug	
2024	Civil War	Eddie	
2024	Your Monster	Jacob	
2025	Echo Valley	Ryan	
2025	Late Fame	Meyers	
2027	The Nightingale	TBA	Filming
TBA	The Vizitant	Jeff Jeckle	Post-production

=== Television ===
Year	Title	Role	Notes
2014	Orange Is the New Black	Roger	Episode: "You Also Have a Pizza"
2014	Unforgettable	Derrick Hibbert	Episode: "Admissions"
2018	Blue Bloods	Evan Walker	Episode: "Blackout"
2019	The Blacklist	Tobias Carlyle	Episode: "The Brockton College Killer (No. 92)"
2020	High Fidelity	Blake	5 episodes
2020	Betty	Bambi	6 episodes
2020	Hightown	Kizzle	4 episodes
2021–2023	Gossip Girl	Scott Kovacs	4 episodes
2022–2024	Tell Me Lies	Max	7 episodes

=== Theater ===
Year	Title	Role	Venue	Notes
2013	The Snow Geese	Duncan Gaesling / Arnold Gaesling (understudy)	Samuel J. Friedman Theater	Broadway
2018	Lewiston/Clarkston	Chris	Rattlestick Playwrights Theater	Off-Broadway
2019–2020	Greater Clements	Joe	Lincoln Center Theater	Off-Broadway
2021–2022	Clyde's	Jason	Hayes Theatre	Broadway

== Awards and nominations ==
Year	Award	Category	Work	Result
2019	Clive Barnes Award	Theater Artist Award	Lewiston/Clarkston	Won
2019	Drama Desk Award	Outstanding Actor in a Play	Lewiston/Clarkston	Nominated
2020	Lucille Lortel Award	Outstanding Lead Actor in a Play	Greater Clements	Won
2020	Drama League Award	Distinguished Performance	Greater Clements	Nominated
2020	Outer Critics Circle Award	Outstanding Actor in a Play	Greater Clements	Won
2020	Drama Desk Award	Outstanding Actor in a Play	Greater Clements	Won
2020	Obie Award	Performance	Greater Clements	Won
