= Can You Ever Forgive Me? =

2018 film directed by Marielle Heller

- Theatrical release poster
- Directed by: Marielle Heller
- Screenplay by: Nicole Holofcener; Jeff Whitty
- Based on: Can You Ever Forgive Me? by Lee Israel
- Produced by: Anne Carey; Guillermo Canberra; David Yarnell
- Starring: Melissa McCarthy; Richard E. Grant; Dolly Wells; Jane Curtin; Anna Deavere Smith; Stephen Spinella; Ben Falcone
- Cinematography: Brandon Trost
- Edited by: Anne McCabe
- Music by: Nate Heller
- Production company: Archer Gray Productions
- Distributed by: Fox Searchlight Pictures
- Release dates: September 1, 2018 (Telluride); October 19, 2018 (United States)
- Running time: 107 minutes
- Country: United States
- Language: English
- Budget: $10 million
- Box office: $12.4 million

Can You Ever Forgive Me? is a 2018 American biographical drama film directed by Marielle Heller, with a screenplay by Nicole Holofcener and Jeff Whitty based on the 2008 confessional memoir of the same name by Lee Israel. Melissa McCarthy stars as Israel, and the story follows her attempts to revitalize her failing writing career by forging letters from deceased authors and playwrights. The film also features Richard E. Grant, Dolly Wells, Jane Curtin, Anna Deavere Smith, Stephen Spinella, and Ben Falcone in supporting roles. Israel took the title from an apologetic line in a letter in which she posed as Dorothy Parker.

The film had its world premiere at the Telluride Film Festival on September 1, 2018. It was released in the United States on October 19, 2018, by Fox Searchlight Pictures, grossing $12 million against a production budget of $10 million, and received critical acclaim. The National Board of Review named it as one of the top ten films of 2018, and for their performances, McCarthy and Grant earned nominations for Best Actress and Best Supporting Actor, respectively, at the 91st Academy Awards, the 76th Golden Globe Awards, and the 72nd British Academy Film Awards, among other ceremonies. Holofcener and Whitty were nominated for the Academy Award for Best Adapted Screenplay and won the Writers Guild of America Award for Best Adapted Screenplay.

== Plot ==
In 1991, following the critical and commercial failure of her biography of Estée Lauder, author Lee Israel struggles with financial troubles, writer's block, and alcoholism. Her only friend is her cat, which has a health issue. Lee hopes to write a biography of comedian Fanny Brice, who died in 1951, but her literary agent, Marjorie, sharply rejects the idea, noting that Brice’s life no longer interests people. Marjorie bluntly adds that Lee is not remotely successful enough to act like she does, which is to say miserable and angry all the time.

With Marjorie unable to secure her an advance for a new book regardless of subject matter, Lee resorts to selling her possessions to cover her living expenses. She sells a personal letter she received long ago from Katharine Hepburn to Anna, a used bookstore merchant and autograph dealer. Lee begins spending time with old acquaintance Jack Hock after a chance encounter with him at a gay bar called Julius’, where he reveals he has been banned from all Duane Reade locations for shoplifting.

Lee visits a Manhattan library's special collections department to research Fanny Brice and discovers two letters typewritten by Brice. She removes one of them from the building, takes it to Anna's store, and shows it to her. Anna makes Lee an offer that is lower than what she was expecting, due to the letter's bland content. Lee returns home and uses a typewriter to add a postscript to the letter, then returns to the store where Anna, now amused by what "Fanny Brice" wrote "several decades ago", offers Lee $350. She also asks Lee for advice on whether her short stories are worth publishing, but Lee, who is socially phobic, replies cautiously. Lee uses some of the $350 to pay for her cat's treatment by a veterinarian.

Emboldened by her success with selling the Brice letter, Lee starts forging and selling letters supposedly written by deceased celebrities, incorporating intimate details to command high prices. Anna, a fan of Lee's biographies, tries to initiate a romantic relationship with Lee, while also hoping for Lee's input regarding her short stories, but Lee rebuffs her.

In some of Lee's forged letters, she has Noël Coward make references to his social life that reflects his homosexuality. Paul, a used-book dealer, buys one of them from Lee and sends it to a friend of his who knew Coward. The recipient doubts Coward would have risked his privacy and relays his suspicions to Paul, who warns others, leading to Lee's customers blacklisting her. Unable to sell more forgeries, she has Jack sell them on her behalf, since the customers do not know he has a connection to Lee. She also starts stealing authentic letters from libraries and archives for Jack to sell, replacing them with forged duplicates. While Lee is out of town committing one such theft, she lets Jack stay in her apartment. Jack spends the night with a young waiter from Julius’, when Lee's cat dies. Lee ends their friendship but continues their partnership out of necessity.

The Federal Bureau of Investigation, having been alerted to the forgery scheme, arrests Jack while he is attempting a sale. He cooperates with investigators, resulting in Lee being served with a court summons. She retains a lawyer, who advises her to show contrition by getting a job, doing community service, and joining Alcoholics Anonymous. In court, Lee admits she enjoyed creating the forgeries, but that her actions were ultimately not worth it because she lost her cat and her friendship with Jack. The judge sentences Lee to five years' probation and six months' house arrest.

During house arrest, Lee skips her court-ordered AA meeting to meet with Jack, who is dying of AIDS, at Julius’, and they reconcile. Lee does not comment on or ask about his health. He grants her permission to write a memoir about their escapades. Sometime later, while Lee is passing a bookstore, she sees a Dorothy Parker letter she forged that is now on sale for $1,900. She writes the store owner a sarcastic note from the deceased Parker revealing that the letter is a fake. After reading the note, the owner goes to retrieve the letter, but then decides to keep it on display.

== Cast ==
- Melissa McCarthy as Lee Israel
- Richard E. Grant as Jack Hock
- Dolly Wells as Anna Miller, the kind owner of a bookstore
- Jane Curtin as Marjorie, Lee's agent
- Ben Falcone as Alan Schmidt, the shady owner of a bookstore
- Anna Deavere Smith as Elaine, Lee's ex-girlfriend
- Stephen Spinella as Paul, the owner of a fancy bookstore
- Gregory Korostishevsky as Andrei, Lee's super
- Christian Navarro as Kurt, a waiter at a diner
- Pun Bandhu as Agent Doyle, FBI
- Erik LaRay Harvey as Agent Solanas, FBI
- Brandon Scott Jones as Glen, an impolite bookstore employee
- Shae D'lyn as Nell, a seller of celebrity letters
- Rosal Colon as Rachel, a veterinary assistant
- Marc Evan Jackson as Lloyd, Lee's lawyer
- Sandy Rosenberg as Yale Librarian
- Kevin Carolan as Tom Clancy
- Mary McCann as Judge
- Michael Laurence as Fenwick, (Note: The bookstore Fenwick owns is named Renwick & Co. Rare Books.) the owner of a bookstore
- Justin Vivian Bond as Lounge Singer
- Tim Cummings as Craig, the bartender at Julius'

== Production ==
=== Development and casting ===
In 2011 when the project was first conceived, Sam Rockwell was set to play the character of Jack Hock. In April 2015 it was announced that Julianne Moore would play Lee Israel, with Nicole Holofcener set to direct from her own screenplay. On May 14, 2015, Chris O'Dowd joined the cast. In July 2015, Moore and Holofcener dropped out of the project due to "creative conflicts." In May 2016 Melissa McCarthy—whose husband, Ben Falcone, had been cast in a supporting role in the film—was confirmed to have been cast as Israel, with Marielle Heller directing from Holofcener's script. In January 2017 Richard E. Grant, Jane Curtin, Dolly Wells, Anna Deavere Smith, and Jennifer Westfeldt joined the cast. Westfeldt does not appear in the finished film, as the storyline featuring her character was deleted.

=== Filming ===
Filming in New York City began in January 2017 and concluded on March 2, 2017. The film takes liberties in depicting Lee's relationship with Jack: the friendship's rupturing had nothing to do with Lee's cat (it was entirely about Jack turning Lee in for the forgeries, which the film does present accurately) and after that happened Lee and Jack had no reconciliation and zero contact before his death from AIDS-related complications. A scripted scene had the true-to-life moment where Lee saw Jack in a NYC medical clinic for indigent people and barely restrained herself from tripping him as he walked past her without seeing her, but it wasn't filmed.

== Release and reception ==
Can You Ever Forgive Me? had its world premiere at the Telluride Film Festival on September 1, 2018, and also screened at the Toronto International Film Festival that month. It was released in the United States on October 19, 2018. The film was dedicated to its subject, author Leonore Carol Israel, who was born on December 3, 1939, and died on December 24, 2014.

=== Box office ===
The film grossed $8.8 million in the United States and Canada and $3.7 million in other territories for a total worldwide box office gross of $12.5 million (against a production budget of $10 million).

Can You Ever Forgive Me? grossed $150,000 from five theaters during its opening weekend. On the second weekend, it earned $380,000 from 25 theaters. It expanded to 180 theaters for its third weekend, earning $1.08 million. The film grossed $1.5 million from 391 theaters on its fourth weekend. During its fifth weekend, it earned $880,000 from 555 theaters, bringing the total box office gross to over $5 million. During its 11th weekend in release the film crossed $7.5 million stateside.

=== Critical response ===
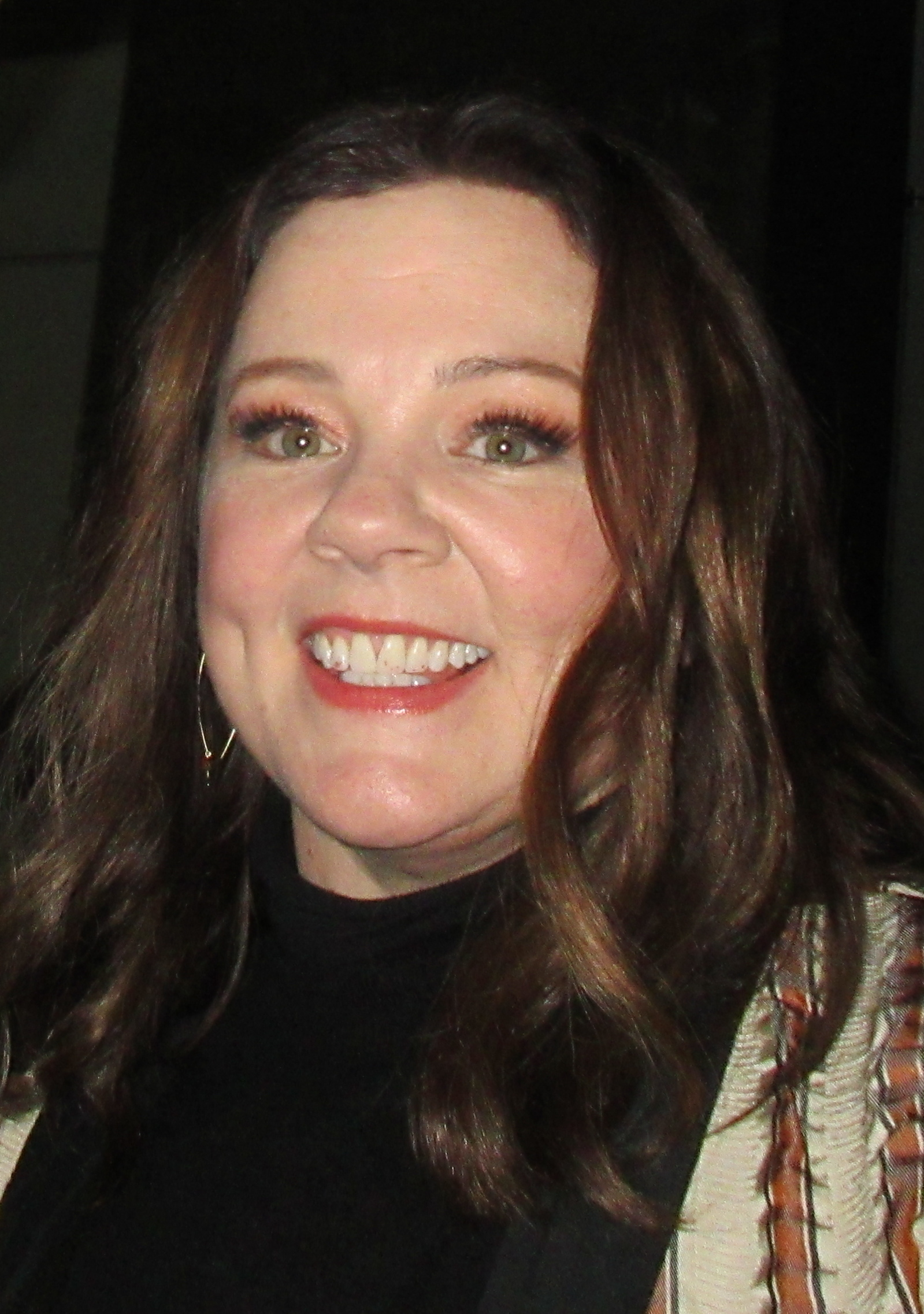
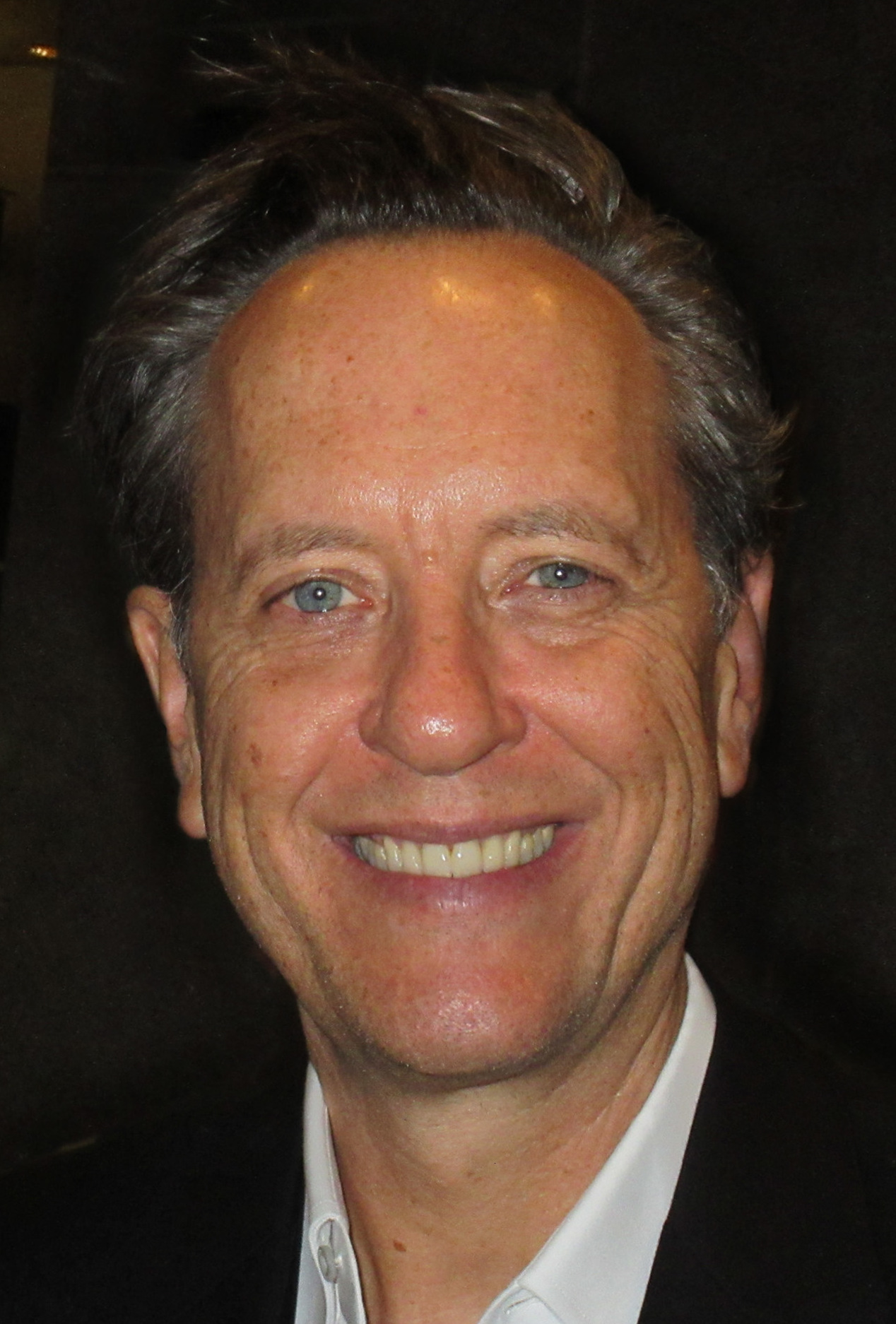
Melissa McCarthy and Richard E. Grant's performances garnered Academy Award nominations for Best Actress and Best Supporting Actor, respectively.

On film review aggregator website Rotten Tomatoes, the film holds an approval rating of 98% based on 320 reviews, with an average score of 8.2/10; the site's "critics consensus" reads: "Deftly directed and laced with dark wit, Can You Ever Forgive Me? proves a compelling showcase for deeply affecting work from Richard E. Grant and Melissa McCarthy." On Metacritic the film has a weighted average score of 87 out of 100 based on 53 critics, indicating "universal acclaim".

Peter Debruge of Variety wrote that "it takes an actress as delightful as [Melissa McCarthy] to make such a woman not just forgivable but downright lovable" but was critical of the film's promotion, writing: "One gets the impression that Fox Searchlight is trying to hide (or at least downplay) the homosexual side of this story: Lee was a lesbian, while the openly gay Jack [Hock] can hardly pass a fire hydrant without asking for its phone number."

Film Journal International deemed McCarthy's performance as "stunning" and wrote that her previous film roles "could not anticipate how fearlessly and credibly she inhabits Lee Israel". Eric Kohn of IndieWire called the film a "charming melancholic comedy" in which "Heller channels the dark urban milieu of vintage Woody Allen" and wrote that McCarthy's performance "elevates the material at every opportunity".

=== Awards and nominations ===
Award	Date of ceremony	Category	Recipient(s)	Result	Ref.
Gotham Awards	November 26, 2018	Best Actor	Richard E. Grant	Nominated	
National Board of Review	November 27, 2018	Top 10 Films	Can You Ever Forgive Me?	Won	
New York Film Critics Circle	November 29, 2018	Best Supporting Actor	Richard E. Grant	Won	
Detroit Film Critics Society	December 3, 2018	Best Actress	Melissa McCarthy	Nominated	
Detroit Film Critics Society	December 3, 2018	Best Supporting Actor	Richard E. Grant	Nominated	
Washington D.C. Area Film Critics Association	December 3, 2018	Best Actress	Melissa McCarthy	Nominated	
Washington D.C. Area Film Critics Association	December 3, 2018	Best Supporting Actor	Richard E. Grant	Nominated	
Washington D.C. Area Film Critics Association	December 3, 2018	Best Adapted Screenplay	Nicole Holofcener and Jeff Whitty	Won	
Chicago Film Critics Association	December 7, 2018	Best Actress	Melissa McCarthy	Nominated	
Chicago Film Critics Association	December 7, 2018	Best Supporting Actor	Richard E. Grant	Won	
Chicago Film Critics Association	December 7, 2018	Best Adapted Screenplay	Nicole Holofcener and Jeff Whitty	Nominated	
Los Angeles Film Critics Association	December 9, 2018	Best Screenplay	Nicole Holofcener and Jeff Whitty	Won	
New York Film Critics Online Awards	December 9, 2018	Best Actress	Melissa McCarthy	Won	
New York Film Critics Online Awards	December 9, 2018	Best Supporting Actor	Richard E. Grant	Won	
San Diego Film Critics Society	December 10, 2018	Best Actress	Melissa McCarthy	Nominated	
San Diego Film Critics Society	December 10, 2018	Best Supporting Actor	Richard E. Grant	Won	
San Diego Film Critics Society	December 10, 2018	Best Adapted Screenplay	Nicole Holofcener and Jeff Whitty	Nominated	
San Francisco Film Critics Circle	December 9, 2018	Best Actress	Melissa McCarthy	Won	
San Francisco Film Critics Circle	December 9, 2018	Best Supporting Actor	Richard E. Grant	Nominated	
San Francisco Film Critics Circle	December 9, 2018	Best Adapted Screenplay	Nicole Holofcener and Jeff Whitty	Nominated	
Toronto Film Critics Association	December 9, 2018	Best Actress	Melissa McCarthy	Nominated	
Toronto Film Critics Association	December 9, 2018	Best Supporting Actor	Richard E. Grant	Nominated	
Boston Society of Film Critics	December 16, 2018	Best Actress	Melissa McCarthy	Won	
Boston Society of Film Critics	December 16, 2018	Best Supporting Actor	Richard E. Grant	Won	
Boston Society of Film Critics	December 16, 2018	Best Screenplay	Nicole Holofcener and Jeff Whitty	Won	
Dallas–Fort Worth Film Critics Association	December 17, 2018	Best Picture	Can You Ever Forgive Me?	Nominated	
Dallas–Fort Worth Film Critics Association	December 17, 2018	Best Actress	Melissa McCarthy	Nominated	
Dallas–Fort Worth Film Critics Association	December 17, 2018	Best Supporting Actor	Richard E. Grant	Nominated	
Seattle Film Critics Awards	December 17, 2018	Best Supporting Actor	Richard E. Grant	Won	
St. Louis Film Critics Association	December 17, 2018	Best Supporting Actor	Richard E. Grant	Won	
St. Louis Film Critics Association	December 17, 2018	Best Adapted Screenplay	Nicole Holofcener and Jeff Whitty	Nominated	
Vancouver Film Critics Circle	December 17, 2018	Best Actress	Melissa McCarthy	Won	
Vancouver Film Critics Circle	December 17, 2018	Best Supporting Actor	Richard E. Grant	Won	
Florida Film Critics Circle	December 21, 2018	Best Actress	Melissa McCarthy	Won	
Florida Film Critics Circle	December 21, 2018	Best Supporting Actor	Richard E. Grant	Nominated	
Florida Film Critics Circle	December 21, 2018	Best Adapted Screenplay	Nicole Holofcener and Jeff Whitty	Won	
Houston Film Critics Society	January 3, 2019	Best Actress	Melissa McCarthy	Nominated	
Houston Film Critics Society	January 3, 2019	Best Supporting Actor	Richard E. Grant	Nominated	
Palm Springs International Film Festival	January 3, 2019	Spotlight Award	Melissa McCarthy	Won	
Golden Globe Awards	January 6, 2019	Best Actress – Motion Picture, Drama	Melissa McCarthy	Nominated	
Golden Globe Awards	January 6, 2019	Best Supporting Actor – Motion Picture	Richard E. Grant	Nominated	
Austin Film Critics Association	January 7, 2019	Best Actress	Melissa McCarthy	Nominated	
Austin Film Critics Association	January 7, 2019	Best Supporting Actor	Richard E. Grant	Won	
Austin Film Critics Association	January 7, 2019	Best Adapted Screenplay	Nicole Holofcener and Jeff Whitty	Nominated	
Alliance of Women Film Journalists	January 10, 2019	Best Actress	Melissa McCarthy	Nominated	
Alliance of Women Film Journalists	January 10, 2019	Bravest Performance	Melissa McCarthy	Nominated	
Alliance of Women Film Journalists	January 10, 2019	Best Supporting Actor	Richard E. Grant	Won	
Alliance of Women Film Journalists	January 10, 2019	Best Adapted Screenplay	Nicole Holofcener and Jeff Whitty	Won	
Alliance of Women Film Journalists	January 10, 2019	Best Woman Director	Marielle Heller	Won	
Alliance of Women Film Journalists	January 10, 2019	Best Woman Screenwriter	Nicole Holofcener	Nominated	
Critics' Choice Movie Awards	January 13, 2019	Best Actress	Melissa McCarthy	Nominated	
Critics' Choice Movie Awards	January 13, 2019	Best Supporting Actor	Richard E. Grant	Nominated	
Critics' Choice Movie Awards	January 13, 2019	Best Adapted Screenplay	Nicole Holofcener and Jeff Whitty	Nominated	
London Film Critics' Circle	January 20, 2019	Best Supporting Actor	Richard E. Grant	Won	
Screen Actors Guild Awards	January 27, 2019	Outstanding Performance by a Female Actor in a Leading Role	Melissa McCarthy	Nominated	
Screen Actors Guild Awards	January 27, 2019	Outstanding Performance by a Male Actor in a Supporting Role	Richard E. Grant	Nominated	
Santa Barbara International Film Festival	February 3, 2019	Montecito Award	Melissa McCarthy	Won	
Santa Barbara International Film Festival	February 3, 2019	Virtuoso Award	Richard E. Grant	Won	
British Academy Film Awards	February 10, 2019	Best Actress in a Leading Role	Melissa McCarthy	Nominated	
British Academy Film Awards	February 10, 2019	Best Actor in a Supporting Role	Richard E. Grant	Nominated	
British Academy Film Awards	February 10, 2019	Best Adapted Screenplay	Nicole Holofcener and Jeff Whitty	Nominated	
Writers Guild of America Awards	February 17, 2019	Best Adapted Screenplay	Nicole Holofcener and Jeff Whitty	Won	
Satellite Awards	February 22, 2019	Best Actress – Motion Picture, Drama	Melissa McCarthy	Nominated	
Satellite Awards	February 22, 2019	Best Supporting Actor – Motion Picture	Richard E. Grant	Won	
Satellite Awards	February 22, 2019	Best Adapted Screenplay	Nicole Holofcener and Jeff Whitty	Won	
Women's Image Network Awards	February 22, 2019	Feature Film	Can You Ever Forgive Me?	Nominated	
Women's Image Network Awards	February 22, 2019	Lead Actress Feature Film	Melissa McCarthy	Nominated	
Women's Image Network Awards	February 22, 2019	Film Written By a Woman	Nicole Holofcener	Nominated	
Women's Image Network Awards	February 22, 2019	Film Produced By a Woman	Anne Carey and Amy Nauiokas	Nominated	
Independent Spirit Awards	February 23, 2019	Best Supporting Male	Richard E. Grant	Won	
Independent Spirit Awards	February 23, 2019	Best Screenplay	Nicole Holofcener and Jeff Whitty	Won	
Golden Raspberry Award	February 23, 2019	Razzie Redeemer Award	Melissa McCarthy	Won	
Academy Awards	February 24, 2019	Best Actress	Melissa McCarthy	Nominated	
Academy Awards	February 24, 2019	Best Supporting Actor	Richard E. Grant	Nominated	
Academy Awards	February 24, 2019	Best Adapted Screenplay	Nicole Holofcener and Jeff Whitty	Nominated	
GLAAD Media Award	May 4, 2019	Outstanding Film – Limited Release	Can You Ever Forgive Me?	Nominated	
