= The Way (TV series) =

British television series

- Created by: Michael Sheen; Adam Curtis; James Graham
- Screenplay by: James Graham
- Directed by: Michael Sheen
- Starring: Steffan Rhodri; Sophie Melville; Callum Scott Howells; Mali Harries
- Music by: Cian Ciarán
- Country of origin: United Kingdom
- Original language: English
- No. of series: 1
- No. of episodes: 3

Production
- Executive producers: Bethan Jones; Rebecca Ferguson; Michael Sheen; Adam Curtis; James Graham
- Producer: Derek Ritchie
- Production companies: Little Door Productions; Red Seam

Original release
- Network: BBC One
- Release: 19 February – 4 March 2024

The Way is a three-part British television series, created by James Graham, Michael Sheen and Adam Curtis, with Sheen directing from a Graham script. The series is set in the 2020s and follows the Driscoll family as they attempt to flee the United Kingdom, which has descended into anti-Welsh civil conflict following riots in Port Talbot. The series received mixed reviews from critics.

== Synopsis ==
Following the self-immolation of a steelworker, whose son recently died in an industrial accident at the Port Talbot steelworks, tensions are running high between the workforce of Port Talbot steelworks and its new foreign owners over fears of a surreptitious closure. Geoff Driscoll, a trade union steward haunted by memories of his father, who committed suicide following the failure of the 1984 miners' strike, attempts to come to an agreement with management that quells anger amongst the workforce but his efforts are undermined by a broken promise from the management. The workers, inspired by reports of the mythical "red monk" and speeches by Geoff's estranged wife, Dee, hold a successful strike ballot and begin a blockade of the steelworks.

Geoff and Dee's children, Owen and Thea, have fallen out after Thea arrested Owen to protect him from drug dealers. Thea and Dee attempt to celebrate the birthday of Thea's young son Rhys, whose father Dan has been forced to seek employment in Germany. Owen attempts to win the affections of Anna, a young Polish immigrant he met online, while seeking a purpose to his life in joining the industrial action.

Over the following days, as footage of Dee Driscoll's impassioned speeches on the picket line go viral, demonstrations by various political groups begin across Wales which lead the British government to crack down on the growing civil disobedience, putting Thea and the rest of her family on opposing sides as the local police unite with Gordius, a private security contractor hired by the government to protect scabs brought into the steelworks. Matters come to a head after troops are deployed to keep order in Port Talbot and telecommunications are shut off. A protest march breaks into a riot after Owen throws a metal pole at police lines.

In the aftermath Owen is held at a local makeshift detention facility, while Wales is effectively put under martial law and sealed off from the rest of the country. The family, fearing for their safety after Thea sees Owen highlighted in a Gordius database, break Owen out from the facility with help from Anna and go on the run, hoping to escape the growing violence. The family however are unable to pick up Rhys (who Thea had left with Dan's parents during the disorder) before the authorities are made aware of the breakout, forcing Thea to ask Dan's father Philip to bring Rhys to them. In the growing confusion, while trying to evade an army checkpoint, Philip and Rhys board a lorry smuggling Welsh refugees into England.

With no choice but to follow, Dan arranges for the family to make their way to Cheltenham to hopefully meet up with Rhys and Philip. The main group are smuggled across the border by a sympathetic vicar, avoiding anti-Welsh vigilante blockades by masquerading as dead soldiers. Upon arrival however the group find they have been blamed for the violence that has taken hold in Wales and are forced to flee the town after the arrival of "The Welsh Catcher", a mercenary named Hogwood who has been contracted to hunt down Welsh people who've crossed into England. Heading into the countryside, the group take refuge with Dee's estranged sister Elaine and her Freemason husband Hector, where they are joined by Rhys and Philip. Unable to safely stay in England or return to Wales the group are given Hector's canalboat in a bid to make it to the coast to join other Welsh people hoping to be smuggled across the Channel while Philip, revealed to also be a Freemason and wanting to return to his ill wife, is ferried by Hector and others back to Wales.

Arriving at the coast the group find shelter at a makeshift refugee camp, though they are soon discovered by Hogwood (who is revealed to be Welsh himself) and other mercenaries. Geoff attempts to convince Hogwood of their innocence and to let them go. Hogwood, while admitting that he knows the decision over who he's to target was made by an unaccountable black-box algorithmic system, says he'll follow his instructions nonetheless. He gives the camp an ultimatum: hand over Owen or be razed to the ground. Following discussion within the camp the family are allowed to flee, making their way to the smugglers, while the other occupants of the camp perform a distraction. On the beach Owen decides to stay and try to return to Port Talbot with Anna in tow, while the rest of his family board a small boat to France.

While crossing the Channel the boat begins to take on water. Geoff, having made peace with his father's death and feeling guilt over having secretly been the "red monk" that inspired the strike, sacrifices himself by jumping overboard. Despite surviving the passage, the others, along with Dan who had been waiting for them, are detained by armed French police to an unknown fate. In Wales, Owen and Anna successfully make their way back to Port Talbot whereupon Owen tosses an ancient sword his father had carried along their journey into the sea.

== Cast and characters ==
- Steffan Rhodri as Geoff Driscoll, the father of the Driscoll family who is an employee and trade union steward at the Port Talbot steelworks.
- Mali Harries as Dee Driscoll, Geoff's soon-to-be ex-wife and mother to Thea and Owen.
- Sophie Melville as Thea Driscoll, the older Driscoll sibling, a police officer who lives in Port Talbot with her family and young son.
- Callum Scott Howells as Owen Driscoll, the younger Driscoll sibling, who is struggling with a mental health condition and recovering from a drug addiction.
- Teilo James Le Masurier as Rhys Driscoll, the young son of Thea and Dan.
- Michael Sheen as Denny Driscoll, Geoff's late father, who took part in the 1984 miners' strike.
- Maja Laskowska as Anna, a Polish immigrant and Owen's love interest.
- Aneurin Barnard as Dan, Thea's husband, who was forced to become an expatriate worker in Germany.
- Danny Sapani as The Vicar, a man operating a refugee route across the England–Wales border.
- Mark Lewis Jones as Glynn, a Port Talbot local and steelworker, who helps orchestrate a strike at the steelworks.
- Matthew Aubrey as Neil Griffiths, a local MS, who pushes for strike action.
- Tom Cullen as Jack Price, the MP for Port Talbot, who opposes strike action.
- Luke Evans as Hogwood, a feared mercenary known as "The Welsh Catcher".
- Paul Rhys as Akela, the leader of a Welsh refugee camp.
- Erin Richards as Willis, an employee at GCHQ and friend of Dan's who helps the family.
- Catherine Ayers as Elaine, Dee's estranged sister and Hector's wife.
- Patrick Baladi as Hector, husband to Elaine and a member of the Freemasons.
- Derek Hutchinson as Philip, grandfather of Rhys Driscoll.
- Jonathan Nefydd as Simon, the Prophet of Port Talbot.
- David KS Tse as Mr Kwan, the new owner of Port Talbot steelworks.
- Georgia Tennant as Millie
- Caroline Sheen as Mari

== Production ==
=== Development ===
In February 2023 it was announced that the BBC were on board the project written by James Graham and directed by Michael Sheen, created by Sheen and Graham with Adam Curtis. Derek Ritchie is producer and Bethan Jones is executive producing for Red Seam, and Rebecca Ferguson for the BBC. ITV Studios is international distributor and additional funding has been provided by the Welsh Government via Creative Wales.

=== Filming ===
Filming took place at the Shire Hall, Monmouth, in May 2023. The bulk of the filming took place in Port Talbot, over a number of weeks between April and June, 2023. Other scenes were filmed in Swansea and Abergavenny.

=== Casting ===
Port Talbot locals were used in certain acting roles and as extras, as well as in behind-the-scenes roles. In May 2023 Luke Evans and Callum Scott Howells were announced in the cast.

== Broadcast ==
The series aired in the United Kingdom on BBC One and on BBC iPlayer starting from 19 February 2024.

== Episodes ==
No.	Title	Directed by	Written by	Original release date	UK viewers (millions)
1	"The War"	Michael Sheen	James Graham	19 February 2024	<2.776
2	"The Walk"	Michael Sheen	James Graham	26 February 2024	<2.599
3	"The Wait"	Michael Sheen	James Graham	4 March 2024	<2.700

== Reception ==
=== Critical response ===
A number of critical reviews were negative towards the series. Writing in the Evening Standard, George Chesterton described the series as "preachy and artless", criticising the poorly-developed characters, stereotypical depiction of English and Welsh people in general, and poorly handling the social topics that inspired it. Writing for the Financial Times, Dan Einav gave praise to the first episode for its exploration of themes but describes the following two as "tonally inconsistent and narratively unfocused", in particular criticising how fast the country becomes an "authoritarian, Welsh-persecuting dystopia" and the obvious allegories lacking depth and weight. Writing for The Daily Telegraph, Anita Singh suggests that a more fitting title was "The Mess", with the series being "weird, indulgent, occasionally stirring, frequently pretentious", while also suggesting that Sheen's closeness to the subject matter may have negatively impacted the series. Reviewing the episode for The Independent, Nick Hilton also found the series to be a mess, finding that the series lacked subtlety for the themes it sought to explore and that events happened with "unjustifiable rapidity".

In a more mixed review, Emily Watkins for the i found some plot elements to be irrelevant and the overall series muddled, but praised the cast and the ambition of the project. James Hibbs from Radio Times complimented Sheen's directorial debut and for the use of its cast, though felt that it lost itself when straying from political themes.

Lucy Mangan was more positive about the series in The Guardian, saying that the series was "like nothing else on TV", and praised the opening episode as "powerful, confident, ambitious, confrontational and unexpected" but "doesn't quite meet the high bar it has set for itself over the remaining episodes". Rachel Cooke from New Statesman praised The Way as "audacious, intellectual TV" with qualities "both hazily dreamlike and quite potently Welsh, a retro sensibility running right through it like a pattern in a pub carpet. But it's also quite thrillingly political, as if someone had lit a match beneath Newsnight and all the rest".

=== Accolade(s) ===
Award	Date of ceremony	Category	Recipient	Result	Ref.
BAFTA Cymru	20 October 2024	Best Editing	Sara Jones	Won	
I Talk Telly Awards	8 December 2024	Best New Drama	The Way	Nominated	
TV Choice Awards	10 February 2025	Best New Drama	The Way	Nominated	
