= Grangeville (play) =

2025 play by Samuel D. Hunter

- 2025 Off-Broadway production art
- Original language: English
- Written by: Samuel D. Hunter
- Characters: Jerry; Arnie
- Genre: Drama

Premiere
- Date: February 24, 2025
- Place: Signature Theatre Company

Grangeville is a 2025 dramatic stage play by American playwright Samuel D. Hunter. The play premiered in 2025 Off-Broadway at the Signature Theatre Company.

== Plot ==
The play follows two brothers, older brother Jerry, a blue collar worker who has lived in Grangeville, Idaho all his life, and Arnie, a gay artist who fled the town for Rotterdam, Netherlands. The two reconnect for a conversation on care for their ailing mother, which forces them to reckon with their relationship and forgiveness.

== Production history ==
=== 2025 Off-Broadway premiere ===
The play had its world premiere in 2025 Off-Broadway at the Signature Theatre Company. The production began previews on February 4, 2025, opening on February 24 and running through March 23 of the same year. Directed by Jack Serio, the show was announced to star Brendan Fraser as Jerry and Brian J. Smith as Arnie, however Paul Sparks eventually replaced Fraser as Jerry. Serio's direction was described as minimalist, and hyper-intimate. The production received positive reviews, with New York Theatre Guide praising the play as "delicately drawn and deftly acted drama", while The New York Times calling the show "bleak" while praising the end of the show's coup de theatre.

The production was nominated for two Outer Critics Circle Awards, three Drama Desk Awards, two Lucille Lortel Awards and three Dorian Awards.

=== 2026 Los Angeles production ===
A new production of the play opened in Los Angeles at the Ruskin Group Theatre in 2026, running from May 23 to September 21, 2026. Directed by John Perrin Flynn, the production starred Tim Cummings as Arnie and Jeff LeBeau as Jerry. The production received positive reviews, with The Los Angeles Times praising it as "beautifully acted" and claiming it "(took) on an impressive magnitude." Similarly, Stage and Cinema gave the show a positive review, noting that "what it delivers lands precisely" and calling it "the kind of play that stays with you three days out."

== Cast and characters ==
Character	Off-Broadway 2025	Los Angeles 2026
Jerry	Paul Sparks	Tim Cummings
Arnold "Arnie"	Brian J. Smith	Jeff LeBeau

== Awards and nominations ==
Year	Award	Category	Work	Result	Ref.
2025	Drama Desk Award	Outstanding Play		Nominated	
2025	Drama Desk Award	Outstanding Lead Performance in a Play	Paul Sparks	Nominated	
2025	Drama Desk Award	Outstanding Direction of a Play	Jack Serio	Nominated	
2025	Outer Critics Circle Award	Outstanding New Off-Broadway Play		Nominated	
2025	Outer Critics Circle Award	Outstanding Lead Performer in an Off-Broadway Play	Paul Sparks	Nominated	
2025	Lucille Lortel Award	Outstanding Lead Performer in a Play	Paul Sparks	Nominated	
2025	Lucille Lortel Award	Outstanding Lighting Design	Stacey Derosier	Nominated	
2025	Dorian Award	Outstanding Off-Broadway Production		Nominated	
2025	Dorian Award	Outstanding LGBTQ Off-Broadway Production		Nominated	
2025	Dorian Award	Outstanding Lead Performance in an Off-Broadway Production	Paul Sparks	Nominated	
