= Akron (film) =

- Film poster
- Directed by: Brian O'Donnell, Sasha King
- Written by: Brian O'Donnell
- Produced by: Sasha King, Brian O’Donnell
- Starring: Matthew Frias; Joseph Melendez; Edmund Donovan; Andréa Burns; Isabel Rose Machado; Amy da Luz; Cailan Rose
- Cinematography: Patrick Jordan
- Edited by: Bill Snodgrass
- Music by: Bill Snodgrass
- Distributed by: Wolfe Video; Hulu
- Release dates: October 12, 2015 (Seattle Lesbian & Gay Film Festival); February 7, 2017 (United States)
- Running time: 88 minutes
- Country: United States
- Language: English

Akron (stylized as AKRON) is a 2015 independent romantic drama film directed by Brian O'Donnell and Sasha King, starring Matthew Frias and Edmund Donovan. The film portrays Benny and Christopher meeting during a American football game at the University of Akron, where they fall in love. Their budding relationship is threatened by the knowledge that their respective families first met years before, during a tragic accident. The film also stars Andréa Burns. The film has earned awards, including Best Feature Film, at numerous film festivals in the United States.

== Plot ==
In a supermarket, two families are shopping for groceries. Young Christopher and his mother, Carol, are seen driving away in a van, while Benny and his family load their purchases into their vehicle. Carol accidentally hits and kills Benny's brother, Davey. Both families are devastated.

Years later, Benny and Christopher are attending the University of Akron. They meet while playing on opposing teams during a friendly game of American football. Benny and Christopher are immediately attracted to each other and exchange phone numbers. They later go on a date and become boyfriends. Benny and Christopher go to a nightclub with friends and end up spending the night together. As spring break draws near, they decide to spend the week in Florida at Christopher's mother's home. Both families are accepting and supportive of Benny and Christopher dating, but over time, Christopher begins putting the pieces together that his mother is the one who accidentally killed Benny's brother. Christopher realizes this history between the two families just before leaving with Benny on a trip to Florida to celebrate spring break. Despite his hesitations, they continue their journey with a short overnight at a campground where they consummate their love with all the tenderness of young love.

Matters become complicated, however, when Christopher's mother, Carol, discovers who Benny is while the couple visits her home in Jacksonville. Against Christopher's wishes, she makes a heartfelt confession regarding her involvement in Davey's death, causing a distraught Benny to insist on going home to Ohio. Benny briefly breaks up with Christopher twice while quarreling with his family over his relationship. The young couple finally reconcile for good, and attend a local stage production of Arsenic and Old Lace, in which Benny's sister Becca has a starring role. When Benny's parents, Lenora and David, see him arrive with Christopher, they become hurt and angry. Meanwhile, Christopher's mother arrives in Akron, with plans for three things: to pay her respects at Davey's gravesite, ask Benny's mother for forgiveness, and to give her blessing for Benny and Christopher to see each other. Carol's plans have mixed results.

After having a conversation with her husband about "try[ing] harder" to process her grief, Benny's mother invites Benny and Christopher over for dinner.

== Cast ==
- Matthew Frias as Benny Cruz, leading man and Christopher's boyfriend
- Edmund Donovan as Christopher Welling, leading male co-star and Benny's boyfriend
- Joseph Melendez as David Cruz, Benny's father
- Andréa Burns as Lenora Cruz, Benny's mother
- Isabel Rose Machado as Becca Cruz, Benny's sister
- Amy da Luz as Carol Welling, Christopher's mother
- Cailan Rose as Julie, Benny's best friend
- Daniel O'Donnell as Tucker, Christopher's video game loving roommate.

== Release ==
Akron premiered during the 2015 Seattle Lesbian & Gay Film Festival. It was later released in February, 2017 by Wolfe Video in the United States and Canada.

== Critical reception ==
Reviews for Akron were mixed. Rick Powell, writing a review for the Letterboxd website, stated in part, "It's hard to be too critical about such a guileless and sincere effort, especially since its assumption of the normality of gay male love without any social conflict whatsoever feels so refreshing." He added, "For a film which deals with the lasting impacts of a death in the family, it really didn't feel like there was much at stake." Writing for IndieWire, Vikram Murthi stated, "The new film Akron is a gay coming-of-age love story, but with a refreshing twist: none of its characters are in search of acceptance as they've all accepted themselves and have been accepted by their personal communities."

== Accolades ==
Akron has won several awards from film festivals, including:

- 2015 - LGBT Fest Narrative Winner - Columbus International Film & Video Festival
- 2015 - ImageOut Audience Award for Best Independent Feature Film - Rochester LGBT Film Festival
- 2015 - Best Feature Film - OutReel Cincinnati Film Festival
- 2015 - Best Feature Film - Miami LGBT Film Festival
