= Amy Nauiokas =

Amy Nauiokas is an American financial services executive and entrepreneur. She is the founder and CEO of Anthemis Group, an asset manager focused on financial services companies, and the founder of Archer Gray, a media production company. She previously worked at Cantor Fitzgerald and Barclays Stockbrokers.

== Wall Street career ==
Nauiokas began her career on Wall Street, first at Deutsche Bank and Bear Stearns, eventually rising to the position of senior managing director at Cantor Fitzgerald, where she was responsible for bringing the firm's brokerage business online. In 2004, Nauiokas left the firm for Barclays Capital. At the time of her departure, she was Cantor's director of marketing, investor relations, and human resources. At Barclays Capital, Nauiokas was in charge of the firm's eCommerce effort. She remained in that position until 2006, when she became CEO of Barclays Stockbrokers.

== Anthemis ==
After leaving Barclays Stockbrokers in 2008, Nauiokas co-founded Nauiokas Park, a venture capital firm focused on disruptive financial technologies. The firm became Anthemis Group in fall 2010. In recent company materials Anthemis reported assets under management of $1.2 billion and that it had "built, seeded, and scaled, over 200 financial services companies." In April 2023, the firm laid off 28% of staff as part of a restructuring and in the following month canceled a SPAC.

== Archer Gray ==
In 2009, Nauiokas began independently financing and producing movies and plays, such as Once (winner of eight Tony Awards) and The Inevitable Defeat of Mister and Pete. In 2011, Nauiokas founded Archer Gray to invest in media startups and in the development of film, television, and plays.

=== Filmography ===
- Greetings from Tim Buckley (2012)
- The Inevitable Defeat of Mister and Pete (2013)
- Ten Thousand Saints (2015)
- The Diary of a Teenage Girl (2015)
- Mr Holmes (2015)
- 20th Century Women (2016)
- Can You Ever Forgive Me, (2018) directed by Marielle Heller and starring Melissa McCarthy.
- Dead Ringers (2023)
- The Persian Version (2023)
- Nightbitch (2024)

== Personal life ==
Nauiokas graduated from Dickinson College in 1994 with a B.A. in International Studies. She received a master's degree in International Business from Columbia University. She is a trustee of Dickinson. In 2010, Nauiokas launched Bubble Foundation to offer exercise and nutrition programming to low-income children in New York City charter schools. It later merged with Edible Schoolyard.

Nauiokas is married to Barclays banker Harry Harrison and was previously wed to James Connolly, an artist and chef. Her family divides their time between New York City and Washington Depot, Connecticut, where they own an Equestrian Center.
