= William Francis Hoffman =

American dramatist

- Born: Oakville

William Francis Hoffman is an American playwright best known for his play Cal in Camo, which premiered off-Broadway at the Rattlestick Playwrights Theater and starred Katya Campbell, David Harbour, and Paul Wesley.

== Career ==
William's play Drift, was set to star Joe Pantoliano and premiere off-Broadway at New World Stages on March 16, 2020, but the production was suspended due to the COVID-19 pandemic.
