= Sophie Melville =

Welsh actress

- Born: 1991 (age 34–35); Swansea, Wales
- Education: Royal Welsh College of Music & Drama
- Occupation: Actress
- Years active: 2013–present
- Known for: Iphigenia in Splott
- Television: The Pact

Sophie Melville (born 1991) is a Welsh actress of stage and screen from Swansea, Wales. She has twice been the recipient of best actress at the Stage Awards for Acting Excellence, nominated for the Outstanding Solo Performance at the Drama Desk Awards and the Best Actress Award at the Evening Standard Theatre Awards for her work in Iphigenia in Splott.

== Early life ==
Born in Swansea in 1991, Melville studied Drama at Gorseinon College and went on to receive a first class honours in acting at Royal Welsh College of Music and Drama in 2013.

== Career ==
=== Stage ===
She had a “breakout” role in the one-woman play Iphigenia in Splott by Gary Owen which she first played in 2015 at the Sherman Theatre in Cardiff. The play was then chosen as part of the British Council’s Edinburgh Showcase at The Pleasance at the Edinburgh Fringe Festival in 2015. The play transferred to the National Theatre’s Temporary Space in 2016. Melville won The Stage Award for Acting Excellence for her role, in 2015. and was nominated for an Evening Standard Theatre Award for Best Actress in 2016.

Melville then appeared as Marilyn Monroe in Insignificance, at the Theatr Clwyd in Mold, in 2016. Followed by Blackbird, at Cardiff’s The Other Room in 2016. In 2017 she appeared in Low Level Panic, at the Orange Tree Theatre, London.

In 2018 Melville was nominated for the Drama Desk Award for Outstanding Solo Performance and appeared in London’s West End in The Divide. In 2019 she appeared alongside Erin Doherty – playing twins separated at birth, one of whom is raised by a wolf – in the Ross Willis two-hander Wolfie at London’s Theatre 503 in 2019 in which Michael Billington referred to Melville as “an astonishing, rubber-limbed shapeshifter”.

In 2021 she appeared at the Soho Theatre in Herding Cats where The Guardian described her as “one of the best British actors of her generation”'. She also appeared in Morgan Lloyd Malcolm’s play about postpartum depression, Mum, at the Soho Theatre in 2021. In 2022, she played Portia in The Merchant of Venice in the Sam Wanamaker Playhouse at the Globe. Melville returned to Iphigenia in Splott in 2022 at the Lyric Theatre in Hammersmith which The Guardian said “Melville performs with such expressive athleticism that it looks like the theatrical equivalent of triple somersaults at the start“ and describes the show at “perfect theatre”.

In 2023, she appeared in Cowbois at the Swan Theatre, Stratford-upon-Avon. She transferred with the production to London’s Royal Court Theatre in 2024. In 2024 Melville appeared in two hander ‘Girl In The Machine’ at the Young Vic opposite Leah Harvey. Early 2025 she performed opposite Laura Whitmore in Apex Predator at Hampstead Theatre. In September 2025 she opened in the UK premiere of Clarkston at the Trafalgar Theatre, in London's West End, for which she was nominated for Best Supporting Actor at the 2026 WhatsOnStage Awards.

=== Television ===
In 2023 Melville played the lead Thea Driscoll in BBC’s The Way alongside Michael Sheen, Callum Scott Howells and Luke Evans. She has also appeared in Call the Midwife, Bang, Casualty, the first series of the Welsh-set BBC One drama series The Pact.

== Personal life ==
Melville is lesbian.

She was in a relationship with fellow actress Erin Doherty.

== Partial filmography ==
Year	Title	Role	Notes
2016	The Missing	Young Nadia	1 episode
2019	The Left Behind	Lisa	TV film
2020	Call the Midwife	Yvonne Smith	1 episode
2020	Bang	Marissa	3 episodes
2021	The Pact	Mandy	5 episodes
2023	The Chelsea Detective	Daisy Phillips	1 episode
2024	The Way	Thea Driscoll	Lead role
2025	Casualty	Captain Amber Mitchell	1 episode
