= People I Know =

2002 crime drama film

- Theatrical release poster
- Directed by: Daniel Algrant
- Written by: Jon Robin Baitz
- Produced by: Michael Nozik
- Starring: Al Pacino; Kim Basinger; Ryan O'Neal; Téa Leoni
- Cinematography: Peter Deming
- Edited by: Suzy Elmiger
- Music by: Terence Blanchard
- Production companies: Myriad Pictures; South Fork Pictures
- Distributed by: Miramax Films
- Release dates: October 11, 2002 (Italy); April 25, 2003 (United States)
- Running time: 100 minutes
- Countries: Germany; United States
- Language: English
- Box office: $5.4 million

People I Know is a 2002 crime drama film directed by Daniel Algrant. The film stars Al Pacino, Kim Basinger, Ryan O'Neal and Téa Leoni.

People I Know premiered in Italy on October 11, 2002, and was released in the United States on April 25, 2003, by Miramax Films. The film received mixed reviews.

== Plot ==
Eli Wurman is an aging, burnt-out Jewish publicist who dreams of retirement. The mania of his everyday life is fueled by a steady stream of prescription drugs and alcohol. One night, Eli's last remaining "big client"—Cary Launer, an actor considering a campaign for political office—asks that Eli take care of his latest publicity mess: an affair with the hard-shelled, quick-tongued television actress Jilli Hopper and her taste for illegal drugs.

Jilli takes Eli to a drug and sex den that is a place to party for the rich and famous, where she claims to be looking for a toy. Jilli is escorted off the premises by security. As she demands to know where her toy is, it is given to her, and she tells the guards, "I got all of you now". Eli is too stoned to understand the exchange.

Eli takes her back to the hotel room, where he takes more pills and passes out in the bathtub after accidentally witnessing what appears to be the actress's rape and murder. But in his opiate daze, he cannot be sure. By the next morning, the memory is forgotten, and he needs to organize a charity benefit.

Eli is tempted to permanently leave New York with Victoria, his former sister-in-law and widow of his deceased brother. Victoria's feelings for Eli are mutual, and she genuinely cares about and desires him. She offers life away from his current lifestyle. However, Eli is hesitant because she is his brother's widow.

Eli's work is interrupted by the police who question him and by acquaintances trying to ascertain how much that Eli has seen and recalls. Eli finally realizes that he is involved in something politically dangerous, and powerful forces are at play to keep his mouth shut. As he strives to bring together the people who he knows—members of the Black and Jewish communities, film stars and media—for the grand fundraiser, Eli's life is in grave danger.

Eli struggles with remembering what had happened that night. Through a series of flashbacks, combined with visits from the people who he knows, it becomes apparent that Eli's life is in danger, but Eli fails to realize it. The people who Eli trusts are the people who are threatened by the photos. Eli pulls off a successful event surrounded by these individuals. The fundraiser is a success, but unfortunately, Eli is killed by the people who helped make it so.

== Cast ==
- Al Pacino as Eli Wurman
- Kim Basinger as Victoria Gray
- Ryan O'Neal as Cary Launer
- Téa Leoni as Jilli Hopper
- Richard Schiff as Elliot Sharansky
- Bill Nunn as The Reverend Lyle Brunt
- Robert Klein as Dr. Sandy Napier
- Mark Webber as Ross
- Brian McConnachie as Jamie Hoff
- Frank Wood as Michael Wormly
- Peter Gerety as Norris Volpe
- Betsy Aidem as Talia Greene

== Filming ==
The filming took place in New York City between February and April 2001.

== Release ==
The film was originally scheduled to be released in late 2001. Following the terrorist attacks on September 11, 2001, however, the film was postponed to an October 2002 release, due to the film containing shots of the World Trade Center that were removed from the film before its release. They can be found on the DVD release.

== Reception ==
The film received mixed reviews. On the review aggregator website Rotten Tomatoes, 45% of 56 critics' reviews are positive, with an average rating of 5.5/10. The website's consensus reads: "The derivative plot fails to cohere or draw the viewer in." Metacritic, which uses a weighted average, assigned the film a score of 53 out of 100, based on 20 critics, indicating "mixed or average" reviews.

Empire gave a largely positive review, awarding four stars out of five, noting, "May be a slow-burn, but despite its lack of success elsewhere, it's still more than worthy of its long-delayed cinema release. Discerning audiences willing to invest in the characters will soon warm to the downbeat story and Al Pacino's subdued performance – especially the scenes he shares with Basinger."

BBC called it an "intriguing but deeply flawed thriller".

Time Out's review observed, "With its uncertainties of tone, this is a mess, full of misplaced performances (not least Basinger as Eli's supportive sister-in-law), misfires and moral inconsistencies. But its rebellious spirit is commendable."
