= Daniel Algrant =

American film director

Daniel Algrant is an American filmmaker and writer. He co-wrote and directed Naked in New York (1993), a film produced by Martin Scorsese. Algrant was a repeat director for the television series Sex and The City and the director of films People I Know (2002) and Greetings from Tim Buckley (2012). Algrant is an alumnus of Harvard University and the Columbia University Film school.

== Career ==
Algrant's first feature film, Naked in New York (1993) was executive produced by Martin Scorsese and premiered at the Sundance Film Festival. It won the Critic's Prize at the Deauville American Film Festival and competed at the Tokyo International Film Festival.

Algrant directed People I Know (2002), starring Al Pacino.

How To Grow A Band (2011) is a documentary executive produced by Algrant about the early days of American progressive bluegrass band Punch Brothers.

Algrant directed episodes of the sitcom Sex and The City (1999–2000).

He appears in an uncredited role as author Kelvin Kranz in the 2020 Steven Soderbergh film Let Them All Talk.
