= Ojai Playwrights Conference =

Theatrical development program in Ojai, California

Coordinates: 34.4395°N 119.1868°W

- Genre: Theatre festival
- Frequency: Annual
- Locations: Besant Hill School, Ojai, California
- Country: United States
- Inaugurated: 1998
- Website: www.ojaiplays.org

The Ojai Playwrights Conference is a new play development program based in Ojai, California. The mission of the organization is to develop unproduced plays of artistic excellence that focus on the compelling social, political and cultural issues of our era from diverse playwrights both emerging and established, and to nurture a new generation of playwrights and theatre artists.

== Activities ==
Each summer playwrights, directors, dramaturges, and other theatre professionals gather in Ojai for a two-week conference culminating in a New Works Festival, in which new plays are presented in staged readings, and audiences are invited to join in post-play discussions. The readings, performed by professional actors, generally occur at Zalk Theater on the campus of Ojai's Besant Hill School. In addition to the new play workshops, the Festival also features various performance events and presentations of original works by conference interns and youth workshop program participants.

Founded in 1998, the not-for-profit arts organization was led by artistic director and producer Robert Egan from 2001 until 2022. Under his leadership, the Ojai Playwrights Conference has grown over the years in the number of artists served, the diversity of its artists and leadership. In 2019, the Ojai Playwrights Conference was awarded the Gordon Davidson Award for distinguished contribution to the Los Angeles theatrical community by the LA Drama Critics Circle.

Plays developed at the Ojai Playwrights Conference have been performed on Broadway, in the West End, off-Broadway, and at regional theatres. Both "Fun Home" and "Other Desert Cities" were workshopped at the Ojai Playwrights Conference and were Pulitzer Finalists; "Fun Home" won the Tony Award for Best Musical, and Caroline, or Change won the Laurence Olivier Award for Best New Musical. "Eclipsed" and The Motherfucker with the Hat were each nominated for the Tony Award for Best Play.

== Programs ==
- New Works Festival: new work is presented by artists, and unique events designed to connect present playwrights with future artists.
- Playwrights: accessible, open application submission process. OPC only accepts full-length plays (of at least an hour running time) that have not had a full professional production yet.
- Ojai Spring Gathering: Ojai, Ventura, and Santa Barbara County-based artists are invited to join events hosted in Ojai. These include OPC Literary Open Office Hours, Artist Open Call, OPC Friends Happy Hour, OPC Summer Internships, OPC Taco Tuesday Write Nights
- Playwrights Residency: with OPC's commitment to move more plays from page to stage, this program is a cooperation between OPC and Los Angeles theater companies. It aims to help feed the California theatrical ecosystem with new work, and create opportunities for some of the most inspiring theatrical story-tellers in America.
- New Play Development: established and emerging playwrights are brought together yearly to develop compelling new plays for the American theatre.
- Intern Program: internships are offered to college undergraduate students and recent college graduates interested in the new play development process and theatre-making, as part of the Summer Conference and New Works Festival.
- Youth Workshop: this program provides opportunities to high school students, for young artists to engage with and be mentored by playwrights and artistic staff in creating their own original works as part of the Summer Conference and New Works Festival.

== Plays ==
The following plays have been developed through the Ojai Playwrights Conference:

- Other Desert Cities by Jon Robin Baitz
- The Motherfucker With the Hat by Stephen Adly Guirgis
- Between Riverside and Crazy by Stephen Adly Guirgis
- In the Continuum by Danai Gurira and Nikkole Salter
- Eclipsed by Danai Gurira
- God Spies by Bill Cain
- Geometry of Fire by Stephen Belber
- The Little Flower of East Orange by Stephen Adly Guirgis
- Well by Lisa Kron
- Caroline, or Change by Jeanie Tesori and Tony Kushner
