= The Whale (play) =

2012 play by Samuel D. Hunter

- Original language: English
- Written by: Samuel D. Hunter
- Characters: Charlie, early to mid-forties Liz, mid to late thirties Mary, early to mid-forties Ellie, seventeen Elder Thomas, nineteen
- Subject: Drama
- Setting: North Idaho, 2009

Premiere
- Date: 2012
- Place: Denver Center for the Performing Arts

The Whale is a 2012 play written by Samuel D. Hunter. The play, set in Moscow, Idaho, tells the story of a 600-pound (270 kg) obese man who hides from the world and stays in his apartment. He cannot stop eating to the detriment of everyone around him, including his estranged daughter.

== Characters ==
- Charlie – He is over 40 years old and morbidly obese.
- Liz – She is a nurse. Critic Paul Hodgins called her Charlie's "enabler" because she feeds him junk food despite his enormous weight and her own pleading with him to get better medical care.
- Elder Thomas – A young Mormon missionary.
- Ellie – Charlie and Mary's daughter. Ellie has not seen or talked to her father in eight years, thanks to her mother's full custody, until she shows up one day at his apartment.
- Mary – Charlie's ex-wife, and Ellie's mother.
- Dan – A pizza delivery boy from a restaurant Charlie orders from every night.

== Production history ==
=== Origins ===
Created through PlayPenn, a new play development program based in Philadelphia, the play was workshopped at the Icicle Creek Theatre Festival in Leavenworth, Washington. It was given the 2011 Sky Cooper New American Play Prize at Marin Theatre Company in Mill Valley, California and was produced there in 2014.

Hunter stated that his reflections on teaching were the initial point of inspiration for The Whale, and that he did not add the obesity aspect until later, as a way of making the teacher have a "distance" from the audience and the other characters. According to Hunter, he made Elder Thomas a Mormon missionary as a way of "self-protection or distancing" so that he could "write about religion, but in a way that didn't feel too close to home". Hunter stated that he used the Elder Thomas character as a "sort of unlikely connection to God".

=== Staging ===
The play had its world premiere at the Denver Center for the Performing Arts performed by the resident theatre company as part of the Colorado New Play Summit in January 2012. The cast included Tom Alan Robbins as Charlie and Angela Reed as Liz. The script was nominated for the Henry Award for Outstanding New Play.

Davis McCallum oversaw the first off-Broadway production in 2012 via Playwrights Horizons. Shuler Hensley and Rebecca Henderson starred as Charlie and Liz, respectively. In 2013, the play was produced at South Coast Repertory with Matthew Arkin as Charlie and Blake Lindsley as Liz. The play had its Chicago debut at the Victory Gardens Theater in 2013 with Dale Calandra as Charlie and Cheryl Graeff as Liz.

The play had a Tokyo premiere in 2023. Sheepdog Theatre produced the run, with Walter Roberts as Charlie, Natsuki Robertson as Ellie, Laura Pollacco as Liz, Carlos Quiapo as Elder Thomas, and Louise Heal Kawai as Mary. It ran in English with Japanese subtitles. In 2024 the play had its Victorian Premier at The Alex theatre in St Kilda, Australia. The play was directed by Jennifer Sarah Dean and starred Adam Lyon as Charlie. The character of Liz did not have her ethnic background or race specified in the original play. As of 2022, many of the actresses portraying Liz were white. This differed from the film version, where the character, portrayed by Hong Chau, is of Asian heritage. In terms of plot progression, a play director named Davis McCallum stated that the goal is to "turn up the pressure until it almost can't be tolerated" and then have a "really cathartic release at the end of the piece".

== Film adaptation ==
Hunter wrote the screenplay for Darren Aronofsky's 2022 film adaptation of the same name. Aronofsky saw the play in 2012 and wanted to adapt it into a film, but he put the project on hold for years because he could not find the right actor to play Charlie. The Whale stars Brendan Fraser as Charlie, Hong Chau as Liz, Sadie Sink as Ellie, and Ty Simpkins as Thomas. It received mixed reviews from critics, but particular praise was directed toward the acting. The film won two Academy Awards at the 2023 ceremony, for Actor in a Leading Role (Fraser) and Makeup and Hairstyling, and was nominated for Supporting Actress (Chau).
