= Lee Israel =

American author and forger

- Born: Leonore Carol Israel; December 3, 1939; New York City, U.S.
- Died: December 24, 2014 (aged 75); New York City, U.S.
- Education: Brooklyn College (BA, 1961)
- Occupations: Author; copywriter; journalist
- Known for: Literary forgery

Leonore Carol "Lee" Israel (December 3, 1939 – December 24, 2014) was an American author known for committing literary forgery. Her 2008 confessional autobiography Can You Ever Forgive Me? was adapted into the 2018 film of the same name starring Melissa McCarthy as Israel.

== Early life and education ==
Israel was born in Brooklyn, New York, to a Jewish family. Her parents were Jack and Sylvia Israel; she also had a brother, Edward. She graduated from Midwood High School, and in 1961 from CUNY's Brooklyn College.

== Career ==
Israel began a career as a freelance writer in the 1960s. Her profile of Katharine Hepburn, whom Israel had visited in California shortly before the death of Spencer Tracy, ran in the November 1967 edition of Esquire magazine. Israel's magazine-writing career continued into the 1970s.

In the 1970s and 1980s, Israel published biographies of the actress Tallulah Bankhead, the journalist and game-show panelist Dorothy Kilgallen, and the cosmetics tycoon Estée Lauder. The Kilgallen book was well received upon its publication in 1979, and appeared on The New York Times Best Seller List. Novelist and book reviewer Rita Mae Brown told readers of The Washington Post in 1979 that Kilgallen had expressed much curiosity about Lee Harvey Oswald and Jack Ruby, despite the prevalence of show business gossip in her newspaper column. Brown added that Israel's book "deserves to be ranked with serious biography just as its subject deserves to be ranked a serious journalist" despite the possibility that some "political movements would probably find even the mention of [Kilgallen's] name a cause for hilarity."

"Despite Israel's deceptive practices more than twelve years after finishing her 485-page Kilgallen book," notes conspiracy theorist Mark Shaw, "there is no indication she fabricated any portion of the book. Some material is incomplete but reference notes at the end of the book appear credible. Ms. Israel's citations of old newspaper articles, magazine pieces and her quotations from numerous books, all check out. Unfortunately, this author was unable to speak with her before she died in 2014."

In her 2008 memoir Can You Ever Forgive Me?, Israel claimed that in 1983, four years after the Kilgallen publication, she received an advance from Macmillan Publishing to begin a project on Estee Lauder, "about whom Macmillan wanted an unauthorized biography — warts and all. I accepted the offer though I didn't give a shit about her warts." Israel also claimed that Lauder repeatedly attempted to bribe her into dropping the project. In the book, Israel discredited Lauder's public statements that she was born into European aristocracy and attended church regularly in Palm Beach, Florida. In 1985, Lauder wrote an autobiography that her publisher timed to coincide with Israel's book.

Israel's book was panned by critics and was a commercial failure. "I had made a mistake," Israel said of the episode. "Instead of taking a great deal of money from a woman rich as Oprah, I published a bad, unimportant book, rushed out in months to beat [Lauder's own memoir] to market." After this failure, Israel's career went into decline, compounded by alcoholism and a personality that some found difficult.

=== Literary forgery ===
By 1991, Israel's career as a writer of books and magazine articles had ended. She had tried and failed to support herself with wage labor. To make money, she began forging letters (estimated to total more than 400) of deceased writers and actors. Later, she began stealing actual letters and autographed papers of famous persons from libraries and archives, replacing them with forged copies she had made. She and an accomplice, Jack Hock, sold forged works and stolen originals. (Hock had been released from prison a short time earlier for the armed robbery of a taxicab driver.) This continued for over a year, until two undercover FBI agents questioned Israel on a Manhattan sidewalk outside a delicatessen from which they saw her exit, according to her memoir.

It is unclear how her forgeries were detected, but in her memoir Israel indicates that her ability to sell letters ended abruptly and universally.

Israel mentions in her memoir that a Noël Coward expert insisted that Coward would not have referenced his homosexual activities so enthusiastically in letters at a time when such behavior would be punished with a prison sentence. Researchers have doubted that Coward believed authorities in Jamaica, where he lived from 1956 until his death, in his native United Kingdom or in the United States might tamper with his mail. These researchers have noted that Israel never had Coward make an explicit reference to a sexual act. They believe the sheer abundance of letters being sold by Israel aroused suspicion among autograph collectors, dealers and used bookstore owners. Other researchers believe they became suspicious of paper with anachronistic watermarks. Some researchers suspect Israel's use of very ordinary (aged) paper raised an alarm because the sophisticated letter writers were likely to have owned the finest stationery.

Israel's memoir makes clear that her name suddenly became toxic among autograph collectors, dealers and used book merchants no matter exactly how they caught on. Moreover, she criticizes the guild of autograph brokers: Before they became suspicious, they never required her to recite her prepared lies about how a letter came into her hands. Israel points out that their own code of conduct required all of them to be able to attest unquestioningly to a detailed account of the provenance of each document.

Her criminal prosecution was set in motion not over the forgeries she was selling to collectors, but over the forgeries she was slipping into library and museum files to replace the genuine letters she was stealing. The forgeries she sold had not involved interstate commerce or great sums of money and so were overlooked by the FBI and other law enforcement. But when autograph dealer David Lowenherz learned that an Ernest Hemingway letter he had purchased from Israel's accomplice, Jack Hock, was supposed to be in the Columbia University archives, it was discovered that Columbia's letter had been replaced by a forgery and Israel had signed the register for examining the relevant archive folder.

At this point, the FBI was called in and an investigation showed that Israel had stolen authentic letters, replacing them with forged copies, from several institutional collections. According to David Lowenherz, Israel and Hock were arrested together by the FBI when they met at a bank to cash Lowenherz's check from a sale.

In Israel's memoir, where she cites FBI documents from her case file, her story of her encounter with the FBI differs from the account by Lowenherz. She describes her encounter with two FBI agents on a sidewalk outside a Manhattan delicatessen where she had waited for Jack Hock to meet her so they could count the cash from a sale he had made (she had caught him stealing when they had met at her home several weeks earlier). Israel claims Hock failed to show up at the delicatessen and she decided to return to her home in case he had gone there, instead.

When Israel exited the delicatessen, her memoir goes on to say, she was startled by a man's voice shouting "Lee!", and she noticed that another man "appeared to be with him". "The man in my face showed me a big star affixed to his wallet that glinted in the sunlight. The lunch-hour crowd milled around us." She told them she needed to consult with her lawyer. The two agents on the sidewalk left without arresting her or telling her what was going to happen next. They did tell her that Jack Hock was in federal custody and he had requested that she never try to contact him again.

She immediately returned to her apartment and started to destroy all evidence of her crimes, discarding in public trash cans more than a dozen typewriters she had used to emulate the look of the famous writers' letters. By the time she was served with a federal warrant ordering her to save this evidence, it had already been destroyed. Israel also claims she was never arrested or handcuffed, instead receiving summonses for federal court dates, though Lowenherz's account contradicts hers on this point.

In June 1993, Israel pleaded guilty in federal court to conspiracy to transport stolen property, for which she served six months under house arrest and five years of federal probation. Additionally, she was barred by almost all libraries and archives, ending any opportunity to resume her career as a biographer. She eventually supported herself copy editing for Scholastic magazines.

Even after her exposure and sentencing, some of her forgeries were still being sold by reputable dealers as authentic—and at substantially greater prices than she had been paid for them. Some were even quoted in published books as if they were real. Israel later expressed pride in her criminal accomplishments, especially the forgeries.

=== Memoir controversy ===
Some reviewers of Israel's memoir questioned Simon & Schuster's decision to publish it, because she would profit from the sales. One reviewer wrote, "What this is is a hilarious memoir of a self-described miscreant and her pursuit of a meal ticket. Ironically, in a joke the reader will share, by purchasing her book we all participate in buying her that meal." Upon the publication of the memoir in 2008, Naomi Hample, a New York City bookstore owner who had purchased some of Israel's forged letters in 1992, was quoted by The New York Times as saying, "I'm certainly not angry anymore, though it was an expensive and very large learning experience for me. And she's really an excellent writer. She made the letters terrific."

== Death ==
Lee Israel died in New York City on December 24, 2014, from myeloma, a cancer of plasma cells. According to a New York Times obituary, she had lived alone and had no children. Regarding her family, she wrote in her memoir, "I had a brother with whom I had never had much in common."

== Biopic ==
In April 2015, it was announced that a film version of Can You Ever Forgive Me?, starring Julianne Moore and directed by Nicole Holofcener, would be produced. In July 2015, Moore said she had exited the film due to creative differences but later confirmed that she had been fired from the project. In May 2016, it was confirmed that Melissa McCarthy would play Israel, while Marielle Heller would direct the film. Filming of Can You Ever Forgive Me? took place in New York City in early 2017.

The film held its world premiere at the Telluride Film Festival on September 1, 2018, and was theatrically released in the United States on October 19, 2018. For her portrayal of Israel, McCarthy was nominated for the Academy Award for Best Actress.

== Bibliography ==
- Miss Tallulah Bankhead (1972), a biography of Tallulah Bankhead
- Kilgallen (1980), a biography of Dorothy Kilgallen
- Estée Lauder: Beyond the Magic (1985), an unauthorized biography of Estée Lauder
- Can You Ever Forgive Me?: Memoirs of a Literary Forger (2008)
