= Boise Contemporary Theater =

American theatre company

Coordinates: 43°36′44″N 116°12′28″W

- Abbreviation: BCT
- Formation: 1997
- Type: Theatre company
- Purpose: Contemporary theatrical productions
- Location: Boise, Idaho
- Producing Artistic Director: Benjamin Burdick
- Managing Director: Emily Mahon
- Main organ: Board of Trustees
- Awards: Mayor’s Award for Excellence in the Arts 2013; Governor’s Award in the Arts in 2016; two-time recipient National Theater Company Award from the American Theater Wing; 2022–23 City of Boise Cultural Ambassador; National Endowment for the Arts Grant Recipient 2024
- Website: Boise Contemporary Theater

Boise Contemporary Theater (BCT) is a professional theater company located in Boise, Idaho. Since 1997, BCT has been the only professional theater company in southeastern Idaho committed to performing a complete season of contemporary work.

Each year, BCT conducts five main stage productions during an October-to-April season, their acclaimed 5x5 reading series featuring staged readings of plays in development, a children's reading series featuring contemporary children’s theater in a creative environment, a summer reading series including readings at local Bogus Basin mountain, and the annual BIPOC Playwright's Festival in August.

The theater's success has been credited to the diversity of productions, award winning set design, and talented actors hired from around the country. “We conduct auditions in New York and Los Angeles and also rely heavily on local talent,” noted Adam Park, previous interim managing director at BCT. “We tailor our actor selections to each production and always have phenomenal stars for every performance.” Boise Contemporary Theater frequently showcases world premieres of contemporary theater on its main stage.

== Mission ==
Boise Contemporary Theater "inspires our community to examine our perspectives and better understand ourselves, each other, and the world around us by creating thought-provoking stories of the human experience."

== Venue ==
BCT is located in the heart of BODO District of downtown Boise at 854 Fulton Street.

Formerly a seed house built in 1935, BCT's Main Stage is a cozy black box theater with 231 seats in nine rows. The seats in the theater were donated by The Egyptian Theatre after previous renovation. The chandeliers in the main hall are on permanent loan from the Idaho State Historical Society. They were previously housed at now closed Pinney Theater, an ornate theater and cinema formerly located at 809 W. Jefferson Street in downtown Boise.

As of 2024, BCT has launched their "Setting the Stage" capital campaign to renovate the historic theater and add an onsite pub for patrons.

== History ==
BCT Founder and Artistic Director Matthew Cameron Clark began producing theater in Boise, Idaho in 1996. In November of that year, along with actors he had met the previous summer working for the Idaho Shakespeare Festival, he co-produced and performed in Lone Star by James McLure in the basement of The Mode Building in Downtown Boise. When Clark saw that there was an audience for professional contemporary theater in his home town, Boise Contemporary Theater was born and four more plays in four different venues were produced: Danny and the Deep Blue Sea by John Patrick Shanley (Neurolux and The Flying M Coffeehouse), All in the Timing by David Ives (Esther Simplot Performing Arts Academy), the World Premiere of Drive Me by Maria Dahvana Headley (Baccus Cabaret) and Lonely Planet by Steven Dietz (Stage II of The Morrison Center). Lonely Planet, in the spring of 1999, marked the first production for BCT as a Non-Profit Organization.

Boise Contemporary Theater began a capital campaign in 1999 to renovate a permanent home. Formally a seed house built in 1935, by October 2000, the Fulton street location was transformed into a theater facility with a main-stage, classrooms, rehearsal loft and office space. The initial capital campaign ultimately raised $2.6 million.

On October 12, 2000, BCT premiered its first production in a newly renovated theater on Fulton street in the heart of Boise's Cultural District: Steve Martin's Picasso At The Lapin Agile, directed by Artistic Director and Founder Matthew Cameron Clark. The season would go on to include True West by Sam Shepard and The Cripple of Inishman by Martin McDonagh.

BCT has had two productions directed by filmmaker Michael Hoffman: The Cherry Orchard by Anton Chekhov and Waiting for Godot by Samuel Beckett (co-directed with Matthew Cameron Clark).

Since its formation in 1997, BCT has been recognized with local and national awards. BCT has been twice awarded National Theatre Company Grants from the American Theatre Wing. The theater was the recipient of the 2013 Mayor's Award for Excellence in Art, a 2016 Governor's Award in the Arts, and was selected to be a Boise city 2022-2023 Cultural Ambassador.

In 2021, the Idaho Women’s Charitable Foundation (IWCF) awarded BCT $30,000 to establish the First Annual BCT BIPOC Playwrights Festival. This was followed by $25,000 Grant from the National Endowment for the Arts to support the 4th Annual BIPOC Playwrights Festival in 2024

== Organization ==
Boise Contemporary Theater is governed by a ten member Board of Trustees and managed by five permanent staff members led by Producing Artistic Director Benjamin Burdick and Managing Director Emily Mahon.

== Productions ==
=== Main stage Productions ===
The 2022-2023 Season included four plays: the world premiere of Middle of the World, by Juan José Alfonso (Previous BIPOC Festival reading), The Thanksgiving Play by Larissa FastHorse, Clyde’s by Lynn Nottage, and Silent Sky by Lauren Gunderson.

A list of the previous mainstage productions and reading series, from 2023 to 1997 can be found on the BCT website's Production History.

=== Annual BIPOC Playwrights Festival ===
Started in 2021 with a founding grant from the Idaho Women's Charitable Foundation, BCT's BIPOC Playwrights Festival invites playwrights, directors, and actors to workshop and ultimately perform staged readings of brand new plays. New and mid-career playwrights of color are paired with professional actors, directors, and technicians. The playwrights workshop their script during the week with a director and full cast. In the final days of the festival, live audiences are invited to attend staged readings followed by Q&A sessions. Plays from the BIPOC festival have gone on to premiere as full productions in New York, Los Angeles, and at the BCT Mainstage. New in 2024, the Young Playwrights Initiative ensures one unproduced work by a writer between 18 and 25 years old in the lineup.

BCT was award a $25,000 Grant from the National Endowment for the Arts to support the 4th Annual BIPOC Playwrights Festival in 2024. This also marked the first year the BIPOC Festival staged readings were performed at the BCT Mainstage.

=== 5x5 Reading Series ===
In addition to its mainstage productions, Boise Contemporary Theater hosts five play readings per season known as the 5x5 Reading Series. Often a mix of brand new or in-development plays and award-winning contemporary plays, notable premiere readings include plays by Maria Dahvana Headley (Author of The Year of Yes), Don DeLillo (Novelist/Playwright, Winner of The National Book Award), and Dano Madden, winner of the 2007 Kennedy Center National Student Playwriting Award.

== Education ==
BCT provides professional theater training to youth programs and schools throughout the Treasure Valley. Programs are taught both at BCT and at local schools and venues. The Academy for Contemporary Theater is BCT’s newest offering. Year round classes for adults are available, taught by professional actors. Theater Lab, a program focused on youth ages 12-18, guides participants through creating, writing, designing, producing, and ultimately performing a play. The theater also provides community outreach at local elementary, middle and high schools.
