= Naked in New York =

1993 film by Daniel Algrant

- Theatrical release poster
- Directed by: Daniel Algrant
- Written by: Daniel Algrant; John Warren
- Produced by: Frederick Zollo; Martin Scorsese
- Starring: Eric Stoltz; Mary-Louise Parker; Ralph Macchio; Jill Clayburgh; Tony Curtis; Timothy Dalton; Kathleen Turner
- Cinematography: Joey Forsyte
- Edited by: Bill Pankow
- Music by: Angelo Badalamenti
- Production company: Some Film
- Distributed by: Fine Line Features
- Release dates: 1993 (Deauville); April 13, 1994
- Running time: 91 minutes
- Country: United States
- Language: English
- Budget: $5 million
- Box office: $1,038,959

Naked in New York is a 1994 American romantic comedy film directed by Daniel Algrant and starring Eric Stoltz, Mary-Louise Parker, Ralph Macchio, Jill Clayburgh, Tony Curtis, Timothy Dalton, and Kathleen Turner, and featuring multiple celebrity cameos, including William Styron listing all of his authored, penned and film work, Whoopi Goldberg as a bas-relief mask, and former New York Dolls singer David Johansen as a talking monkey, which were arranged by executive producer Martin Scorsese.

== Plot ==
The film is narrated in flashback by Jake Briggs (Eric Stoltz), a young aspiring playwright, culminating in the production of one of his plays off-Broadway by agent Carl Fisher (Tony Curtis). The play is a flop, at least in part because the lead parts are given to two actors, Dana Coles and Jason Brett (Kathleen Turner and Chris Noth), who are "not right" for the roles. Along the journey, Jake reviews his relationships with girlfriend Joanne (Mary-Louise Parker), gay best friend Chris (Ralph Macchio), his mother Shirley (Jill Clayburgh), and his mostly absentee father Roman (Paul Guilfoyle). The film ends with Jake and Joanne going their separate ways, mostly because of competing career goals, and Jake hoping to write more plays with greater success.

== Cast ==
- Eric Stoltz as Jake Briggs
- Mary-Louise Parker as Joanne White
- Ralph Macchio as Chris
- Jill Clayburgh as Shirley Briggs
- Tony Curtis as Carl Fisher
- Timothy Dalton as Elliot Price
- Kathleen Turner as Dana Coles
- Lynne Thigpen as Helen
- Roscoe Lee Browne as Mr. Red
- Paul Guilfoyle as Roman Briggs
- Burr Steers as Shipley
- Lisa Gay Hamilton as Marty
- Chris Noth as Jason Brett
- Whoopi Goldberg as Tragedy mask on theater wall
- Calista Flockhart and Arabella Field as Acting students
- Colleen Camp, Griffin Dunne, and Luis Guzmán as Auditioners
- David Johansen as Orangutan

As themselves

- Eric Bogosian
- Quentin Crisp
- Arthur Penn
- William Styron
- Marsha Norman
- Richard Price

== Critical reception ==
On Rotten Tomatoes the film has an approval rating of 42% based on reviews from 12 critics.

The New York Times called the film "a warm, seductive delight".

=== Year-end lists ===
- 7th worst – Desson Howe, The Washington Post
- Top 10 worst (not ranked) – Betsy Pickle, Knoxville News-Sentinel
