= Jesse Green (theater critic) =

American journalist and critic (born 1958)

- Born: June 8, 1958 (age 68)
- Education: Yale University (BA)
- Occupations: Journalist; author; theater critic
- Spouse: Andrew Mirer
- Children: 2

Jesse Green (born June 8, 1958) is an American culture journalist writing for The New York Times. He was previously the chief theater critic for The New York Times from 2020 until 2025, having been co-chief from 2017. Previously, he was the theater critic at New York magazine.

== Early life ==
Green was raised in a Jewish family in Penn Valley, Pennsylvania, one of two sons born to Rodney and Sally (née Swartz) Green. He worked on student musicals in high school, acting as Will Parker, Cliff Bradshaw, and Prince Dauntless. He also attended the arts summer camp at Interlochen Center for the Arts from 1967 to 1974.

Green graduated from Yale University with a dual major in English and theater. He attended a graduate directing program at New York University, dropping out in the first year. He worked in the Broadway theater world in various roles after graduating college, including as "apprentice" to Harold Prince in 1982 on A Doll's Life, and "gofer" for John Kander. He worked with the conductor Paul Gemignani, and as a music coordinator; according to Green, he was "a kind of an intermediary between the composer, the music director, the orchestrator, the copyist, and often the performers."

== Writing career ==
Green wrote fiction for "little magazines." In the late 1980s, Green was hired by editor Adam Moss to write for 7 Days, a weekly magazine covering New York City arts and culture. He contributed to Vulture and the New York Times.

Green joined New York magazine as a contributing editor in 2008. He began writing theater reviews there while regular critic Scott Brown was on leave. When Brown left the magazine in 2013, Green was given the job of chief theater critic.

In 2017, Green was recruited by The New York Times as co-chief theater critic, joining long-time chief Times critic, Ben Brantley. At the time of his hire, Green often disagreed with Brantley, including about the then-current Broadway revival of The Glass Menagerie, which Brantley dismissed and Green praised. When Brantley stepped down as critic in 2020, Green became chief theater critic.

In 2025, the Times, as part of larger changes to their coverage being made by culture editor Sia Michel, reassigned Green and three other critics to new roles. Green was made culture correspondent.

Green is also the author of three books. His first was a novel, O Beautiful, published in 1992, and his second, the memoir The Velveteen Father, was published in 1999.

Green completed and co-authored the memoirs of Mary Rodgers, following her death in 2014, compiled from her own writing and interviews between Rodgers and Green. Shy: The Alarmingly Outspoken Memoirs of Mary Rodgers is written in Mary Rodgers's voice, with intercessions from Green limited to footnotes.

== Controversies ==
As the lead critic for the city's largest theater section, Green has faced criticism of perceived gender biases. In 2017, after tepid reviews of their Broadway débuts by Ben Brantley, Pulitzer Prize winners Lynn Nottage and Paula Vogel publicly criticized co-chiefs Green and Brantley as representing patriarchal irrelevancies.

In 2018, Green was favorably cited as being respectful of trans and non-binary identities following a controversial review of Head over Heels by co-chief critic Brantley. The Brantley review drew significant criticism—and was later corrected—for dismissing the gender identity of the character portrayed by Ru-Paul's Drag Race contestant Peppermint, who became the first out trans woman to originate a lead rôle on Broadway.

A 2021 review of Lauren Gunderson's play "The Catastrophists," was noted for word choice perceived as sexist, including "overwrought" and "difficult, and for unduly focusing on the playwright's personal life—though the play's subject was Gunderson's husband, virologist Nathan Wolfe. In November 2022, actress Tonya Pinkins wrote an open letter to Green, accusing him of "misogynoir" and of misunderstanding the intentions of a reimagining of A Raisin in the Sun at The Public Theater, in which Pinkins played Lena Younger.

In 2022, the producers of the musical KPOP wrote an open letter to Green and the Times, accusing his negative review of the Broadway production of representing an "implicit assertion of traditional white cultural supremacy." The major points of contention were Green's negative view of the musical's emphasis on electronica in the score and his use of the phrase "squint-inducing" to describe the lighting design. The newspaper defended Green's review of KPOP as "fair," rejecting the allegations of racism. The musical closed on December 11, 2022, after only 17 performances, though the producers denied that the closure was directly related to Green's pan.

== Personal life ==
Green is gay and lives in Brooklyn Heights with his husband Andrew Mirer. Mirer had adopted a son shortly before he and Green met, and they later adopted a second son. This is chronicled in Green's 1999 memoir The Velveteen Father: An Unexpected Journey to Parenthood.

== Books ==
- O Beautiful, Available Press (1992) ISBN 9780345374707
- The Velveteen Father: An Unexpected Journey to Parenthood, Villard (1999) ISBN 9780375501647
- Shy: The Alarmingly Outspoken Memoirs of Mary Rodgers, Picador (2022) (with Mary Rodgers) ISBN 9781250872906
