= Rattlestick Playwrights Theater =

Off-Broadway theater in New York City

Coordinates: 40.73604°N 74.00213°W

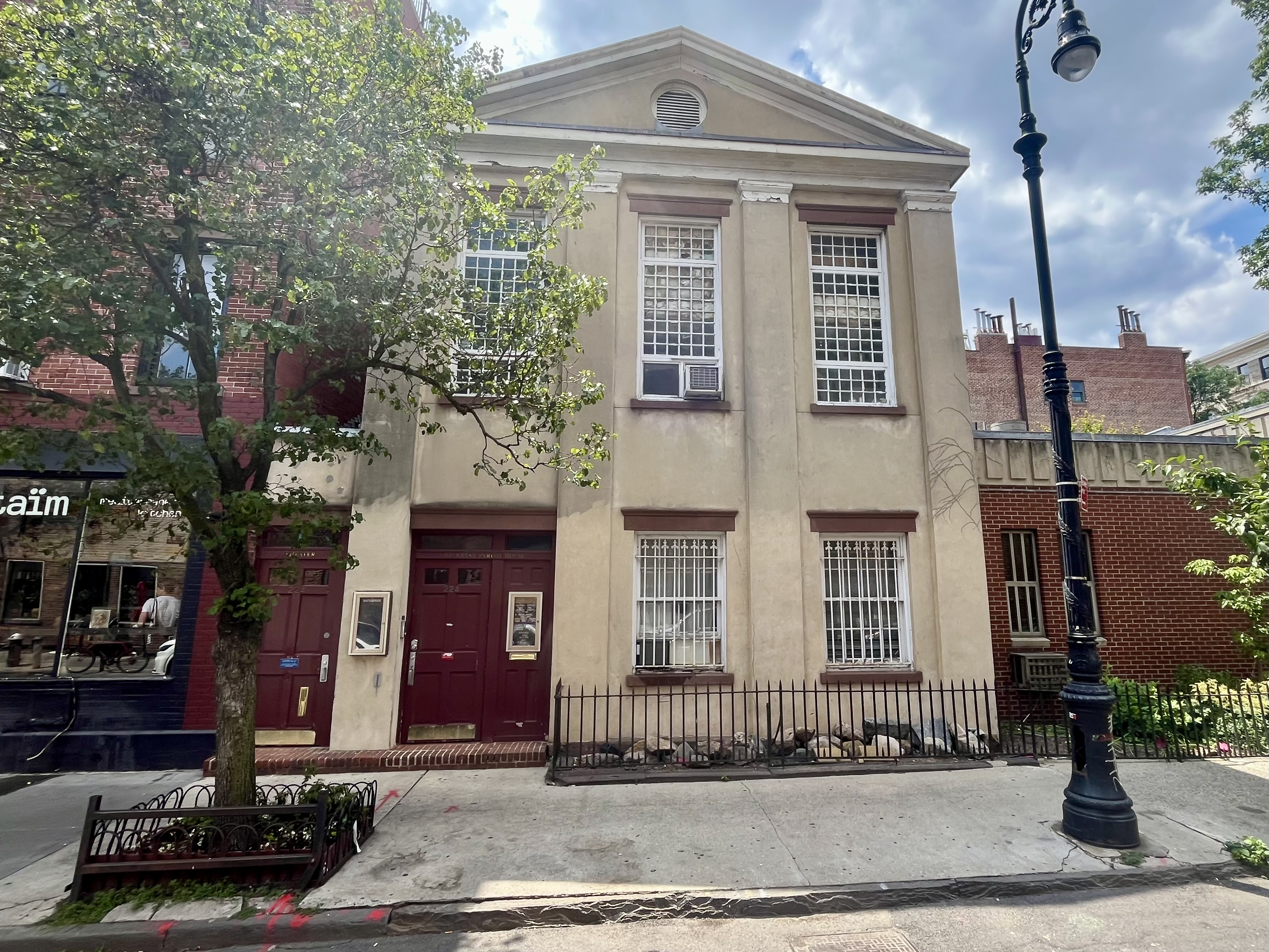
The theater in 2024

Rattlestick Theater is a non-profit off-Broadway theater based in the West Village of Manhattan in New York City.

== History ==
Founded in 1994 by Gary Bonasorte and David van Asselt, its productions include Diana Oh's {mylingerieplay}, Dael Orlandersmith's Until the Flood, Samuel D. Hunter's The Few and Lewiston/Clarkston, Jesse Eisenberg's The Revisionist, Jonathan Tolins’ Buyer and Cellar, Lucy Thurber's The Hilltown Plays, Adam Rapp's The Hallway Trilogy, and Martyna Majok's Ironbound.

A $5.3 million renovation of the Rattlestick Theater was underway by 2026. The Rattlestick Theater was planned to be renamed for Terrence McNally when it reopened.

== Production history ==
Rattlestick's production history by year includes:

| Season | Productions |
|---|---|
| 1995-1996 | Reinventing Daddy by Gary Bonasorte, A Trip to the Beach by David Van Asselt, Carpool by Laura Hembree |
| 1996-1997 | Volunteer Man by Dan Clancy, Winning by David Van Asselt, Message to Michael by Tim Pinckney, Heart of Man by Jennifer Christman |
| 1997-1998 | Hello and Goodbye by Athol Fugard, A Pirate’s Lullaby by Jessica Litwak, And the Pursuit of Happiness by James Edwin Parker, Whale Music by Anthony Minghella |
| 1998-1999 | Ascendancy by Gary Bonasorte, The Weatherbox by Travis Baker, Starstruck by Eric Bernat, Stuck by Jessica Goldberg |
| 1999-2000 | Vick’s Boy by Ben Bettenbender, The Messenger by David Van Asselt, Sex and Violence by Travis Baker |
| 2000-2001 | Saved or Destroyed by Harry Kondoleon, Killers and Other Family by Lucy Thurber, See Bob Run by Daniel MacIvor, Down South by Doug Field |
| 2001-2002 | Neil’s Garden by Geoffrey Hassman, Finder’s Fee by Wesley Moore, My Special Friend by Phillip Courtney |
| 2002-2003 | Faster by Adam Rapp, Bliss by Ben Bettenbender, The Last Sunday in June by Jonathan Tolins, St. Crispin’s Day by Matt Pepper |
| 2003-2004 | Where We’re Born by Lucy Thurber, Five Flights by Adam Bock, Boise by David Folwell |
| 2004-2005 | Finer Noble Gases by Adam Rapp, God Hates the Irish by Sean Cunningham & Michael Friedman, Miss Julie by Craig Lucas |
| 2005-2006 | The Pavilion by Craig Wright, Acts of Mercy by Michael John Garces, Cagelove by Christopher Denham |
| 2006-2007 | It Goes Without Saying by Bill Bowers, Dark Matters by Roberto Aguirre-Sacasa, Stay by Lucy Thurber |
| 2007-2008 | American Sligo by Adam Rapp, Rag and Bone by Noah Haidle, War by Lans Noren, Steven and Idi by David Grimm |
| 2008-2009 | Lady by Craig Wright, Corpus Christi by Terrence McNally, Geometry of Fire by Stephen Belber, The Gingerbread House by Mark Schultz, That Pretty Pretty by Sheila Callaghan |
| 2009-2010 | Killers and Other Family by Lucy Thurber, Post No Bills by Manda Alvarado, Blind by Craig Wright, The Aliens by Annie Baker |
| 2010-2011 | Underneathmybed by Florencia Lozano, The Hallway Trilogy by Adam Rapp, Carson McCullers Talks About Love by Suzanne Vega, Little Doc by Dan Klores |
| 2011-2012 | The Wood by Dan Klores, Asuncion by Jesse Eisenberg, Horsedreams by Dael Orlandersmith, Yosemite by Daniel Talbott, Massacre (Sing to Your Children) by Jose Rivera, 3C by David Adjmi |
| 2012-2013 | Through the Yellow Hour by Adam Rapp, A Summer Day by Jon Fosse, The Revisionist by Jesse Eisenberg, Buyer & Cellar by Jonathan Tolins, Basilica by Mando Alvarado, Charles Ives Take Me Home by Jessica Dickey, The Hilltown Plays by Lucy Thurber |
| 2013-2014 | How to Make Friends and then Kill Them by Halley Feiffer, One Night by Charles Fuller, The Correspondent by Ken Urban, Ode to Joy by Craig Lucas, The Few by Samuel D. Hunter, A Fable by David Van Asselt |
| 2014-2015 | The Long Shrift by Robert Boswell, Pitbulls by Keith Josef Adkins, Shesh Yak by Laith Nakli, Everything You Touch by Sheila Calaghan, The Undeniable Sound of Right Now by Laura Eason, New Country by Mark Roberts, Afghanistan, Zimbabwe, America, Kuwait by Daniel Talbott, The Twentieth-Century Way by Tom Jacobson |
| 2015-2016 | Hamlet in Bed by Michael Laurence, The Bachelors by Caroline V. McGraw, Ironbound by Martyna Majok, Cal in Camo by William Francis Hoffman |
| 2016-2017 | My Name is Gideon: I’m Probably Going to Die Eventually by Gideon Irving, Orange Julius by Basil Kreimendahl, Nibbler by Ken Urban, Seven Spots in the Sun by Martín Zimmerman |
| 2017-2018 | {my lingerie play} 2017: THE CONCERT AND CALL TO ARMS!!!!!!!!! The Final Installment by Diana Oh, Until the Flood by Dael Orlandersmith, Draw the Circle by Mashuq Mushtaq Deen |
| 2018-2019 | Lewiston/Clarkston by Samuel D. Hunter, The Convent by Jessica Dickey, Lockdown by Cori Thomas |
| 2019-2020 | Novenas for a Lost Hospital by Cusi Cram, The Siblings Play by Ren Dara Santiago |
| 2021-2022 | Ni Mi Madre by Arturo Luís Soria, In the Southern Breeze by Mansa Ra, Addressless by Jonathan Payne |
