= Samuel D. Hunter =

American dramatist (born 1981)

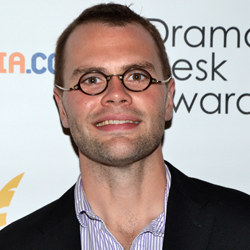
- Hunter in 2013
- Born: 1981 (age 44–45); Pullman, Washington, U.S.
- Education: New York University (BFA); University of Iowa (MFA); Juilliard School (GrDip)
- Spouse: John Baker
- Children: 1

Samuel D. Hunter (born 1981) is an American playwright living in New York City.

Hunter was born in Pullman, Washington and raised in Moscow, Idaho. He is best known for plays A Bright New Boise, which won the 2011 Obie Award for playwriting, and The Whale, which won the 2013 Drama Desk Award and the 2013 Lucille Lortel Award for Outstanding Play. He is also the recipient of a 2014 MacArthur Fellowship. He has also been a guest lecturer at Rutgers University–New Brunswick, Fordham University, and other universities. In 2026, Hunter received his first nomination for the Tony Award for Best Play for Little Bear Ridge Road, which ran on Broadway in 2025 starring Laurie Metcalf.

Hunter is also a writer and producer for the television show Baskets. A film adaptation of The Whale, written by Hunter and directed by Darren Aronofsky, was released in December 2022 and received two Academy Awards.

== Personal life ==
Hunter was forced to leave his Christian school after being outed as gay. He has a daughter with his husband, John Baker.

== Produced plays ==
- I Am Montana (2009)
- Five Genocides (2010)
- Jack's Precious Moment (2010)
- A Bright New Boise (2010)
- Norway (2011)
- A Permanent Image (2011)
- The Whale (2012)
- Pocatello (2014)
- The Few (2014)
- A Great Wilderness (2014)
- Rest (2014)
- Clarkston (2015)
- Lewiston (2016)
- The Healing (2016)
- The Harvest (2016)
- Lewiston/Clarkston (2018)
- Greater Clements (2019)
- A Case for the Existence of God (2022)
- Little Bear Ridge Road (2024)
- Grangeville (2025)

== Awards and honors ==
Hunter was named Resident Playwright at at New Dramatists from 2013-2020, and Arena Stage in 2013. He also received an honorary Doctorate degree in Humane Letters from the University of Idaho in 2015. He has also been named Premiere Writer-in-Residence at Signature Theatre Company in New York City.

Year	Award	Category	Work	Result	Ref.
2008–2009	Lark Play Development Center	Playwrights of New York Fellowship		Won	
2011	Drama Desk Award	Outstanding Play	A Bright New Boise	Nominated	
2011	Obie Award	Playwriting	A Bright New Boise	Won	
2012	Whiting Award		A Bright New Boise	Won	
2013	GLAAD Media Award	Outstanding New York Theatre (Broadway and Off-Broadway)	The Whale	Won	
2013	Drama Desk Award	Special Award	The Whale	Won	
2013	Lucille Lortel Award	Outstanding Play	The Whale	Won	
2014	MacArthur Fellowship			Won	
2019	Drama Desk Award	Outstanding Play	Lewiston/Clarkston	Nominated	
2019	Outer Critics Circle Award	Outstanding New Off-Broadway Play	Lewiston/Clarkston	Nominated	
2020	Drama Desk Award	Outstanding Play	Greater Clements	Nominated	
2022	New York Drama Critics' Circle	Best Play	A Case for the Existence of God	Won	
2023	Critics Choice Awards	Best Adapted Screenplay	The Whale	Nominated	
2023	BAFTA Awards	Best Adapted Screenplay	The Whale	Nominated	
2023	Dramatists Guild of America	Hull-Warriner Award	A Case for the Existence of God	Won	
2023	Lucille Lortel Award	Outstanding Play	A Case for the Existence of God	Nominated	
2025	Outer Critics Circle Award	Outstanding New Off-Broadway Play	Grangeville	Nominated	
2025	Drama Desk Award	Outstanding Play	Grangeville	Nominated	
2025	Dorian Award	Outstanding Off-Broadway Production	Grangeville	Nominated	
2025	Dorian Award	Outstanding LGBTQ Off-Broadway Production	Grangeville	Nominated	
2026	Tony Award	Best Play	Little Bear Ridge Road	Nominated	
2026	Outer Critics Circle Award	Outstanding New Broadway Play	Little Bear Ridge Road	Nominated	
2026	New York Drama Critics Circle Award	Best Play	Little Bear Ridge Road	Won	

== See also ==
- List of playwrights
