= List of Jessica Chastain performances =

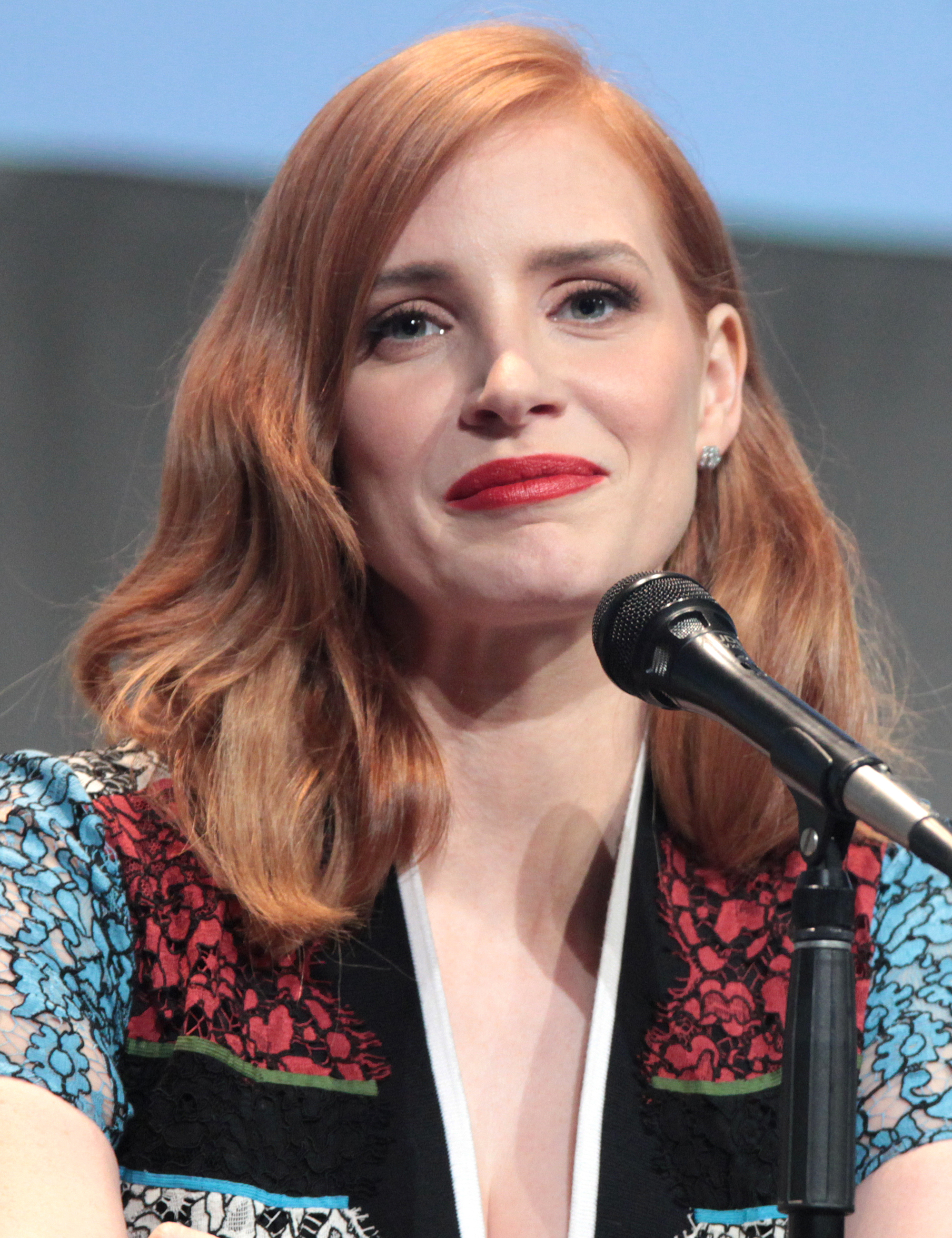
Chastain at San Diego Comic Con in 2015

American actress Jessica Chastain studied at the Juilliard School, where she was signed for a talent holding deal by the television producer John Wells. From 2004 to 2010, she had guest roles in television shows, including ER, Veronica Mars, and Law & Order: Trial by Jury. She also appeared in stage productions with Michelle Williams for The Cherry Orchard in 2004, and with Al Pacino for Salome in 2006. In 2008, Chastain played the title character in her film debut Jolene. She had a minor role in Stolen (2009), a critically panned mystery-thriller, following which she played the younger version of Helen Mirren's character in the action thriller film The Debt (2010).

The year 2011 proved a breakthrough for Chastain. Among her six film releases that year, she starred with Brad Pitt in The Tree of Life, an experimental drama from Terrence Malick, and portrayed an aspiring socialite in 1960s America in the drama The Help. For the latter, Chastain received her first Academy Award nomination, in the supporting actress category. In 2012, she voiced Gia in the $747 million-grossing animated film Madagascar 3: Europe's Most Wanted. She also played a CIA analyst in Kathryn Bigelow's thriller Zero Dark Thirty—a partly fictionalized account of the manhunt for Osama bin Laden—which garnered her a nomination for Academy Award for Best Actress. Also in 2012, Chastain made her Broadway debut in a revival of The Heiress, playing a naive young girl who becomes a powerful woman.

In 2013, Chastain starred in the horror film Mama, and played an unhappily married woman in Ned Benson's three-part drama film, collectively titled The Disappearance of Eleanor Rigby. Chastain's biggest live-action commercial successes came in the next two years with the science fiction films Interstellar (2014) and The Martian (2015), both of which grossed over $600 million worldwide. In the former, directed by Christopher Nolan, she played a scientist, and in the latter, directed by Ridley Scott, she played an astronaut alongside Matt Damon. Chastain went on to play strong-willed titular protagonists in the political thriller Miss Sloane (2016), the historical drama The Zookeeper's Wife (2017), and the crime film Molly's Game (2017). In 2019, Chastain played the adult Beverly Marsh in the horror sequel It Chapter Two. In 2021, she starred in the HBO miniseries Scenes from a Marriage, and produced and starred as the televangelist Tammy Faye in the biopic The Eyes of Tammy Faye. For the latter, she won the Academy Award for Best Actress. Chastain received a nomination for the Tony Award for Best Actress in a Play for starring in a 2023 Broadway revival of A Doll's House.

== Film ==
Key
†	Denotes films that have not yet been released

Year	Title	Role	Notes	Ref(s)
2008	Jolene	Jolene		
2009	Stolen	Sally Ann	Also known as Stolen Lives (Note: The film was screened at the 2009 Cannes Film Festival as Stolen Lives, but was released theatrically as Stolen.)	
2010	The Westerner	Daniel's mother	Short film; also co-producer	
2010	The Debt	Rachel Singer (young)		
2011	Take Shelter	Samantha LaForche		
2011	Coriolanus	Virgilia		
2011	The Tree of Life	Mrs. O'Brien		
2011	The Help	Celia Foote		
2011	Wilde Salomé (Note: A feature film version of the documentary, entitled Salomé, was separately released in 2013.)	Salome	Documentary film	
2011	Texas Killing Fields	Detective Pam Stall		
2012	Madagascar 3: Europe's Most Wanted	Gia	Voice	
2012	Lawless	Maggie Beauford		
2012	The Color of Time	Mrs. Williams	Also known as Tar (Note: The film was screened at the 2012 Rome Film Festival as Tar, but was released theatrically as The Color of Time.)	
2012	Zero Dark Thirty	Maya Harris		
2013	Mama	Annabel		
2013	The Disappearance of Eleanor Rigby (Note: Split into three films—subtitled Him, Her, and Them.)	Eleanor Rigby	Also co-producer	
2014	Miss Julie	Miss Julie		
2014	Interstellar	Murphy "Murph" Cooper (adult)		
2014	A Most Violent Year	Anna Morales		
2015	Unity	Narrator	Documentary film	
2015	The Martian	Commander Melissa Lewis		
2015	Crimson Peak	Lucille Sharpe		
2016	The Huntsman: Winter's War	Sara		
2016	Miss Sloane	Elizabeth Sloane		
2017	I Am Jane Doe	Narrator	Documentary film; also executive producer	
2017	The Zookeeper's Wife	Antonina Żabińska	Also executive producer	
2017	Molly's Game	Molly Bloom		
2017	Woman Walks Ahead	Caroline Weldon		
2018	This Changes Everything	Herself	Documentary film	
2019	Dark Phoenix	Vuk / Margaret		
2019	It Chapter Two	Beverly Marsh (adult)		
2020	Creating a Character: The Moni Yakim Legacy	Herself	Documentary film; also executive producer	
2020	Ava	Ava Faulkner	Also producer	
2021	The Sands Between	Woman	Short film	
2021	The Forgiven	Jo Henninger		
2021	The Eyes of Tammy Faye	Tammy Faye	Also producer	
2022	The 355	Mason "Mace" Brown	Also producer	
2022	Armageddon Time	Maryanne Trump	Cameo	
2022	The Good Nurse	Amy Loughren		
2023	Memory	Sylvia		
2024	Mothers' Instinct	Alice Bradford	Also producer	
2025	Dreams	Jennifer McCarthy	Also executive producer	
2026	Other Mommy	Ursula Martin / Other Mommy		
2026	Heartland	Misty Jones		
TBA	Lear Rex †	Goneril	Post-production	
TBA	My Darling California †	Sharon Normandie	Filming	

== Television ==
Key
†	Denotes television productions that have not yet been released

Year	Title	Role	Notes	Ref(s)
2004	Dark Shadows	Carolyn Stoddard	Unaired pilot	
2004	ER	Dahlia Taslitz	Episode: "Forgive and Forget"	
2004	Veronica Mars	Sarah Williams	Episode: "The Girl Next Door"	
2005–2006	Law & Order: Trial by Jury	ADA Sigrun Borg	3 episodes	
2006	Close to Home	Casey Wirth	Episode: "The Rapist Next Door"	
2006	The Evidence	Laura Green	Episode: "Pilot"	
2006	Blackbeard	Charlotte Ormand	Miniseries	
2007	'Til Death	Hostess	Episode: "The Italian Affair"	
2007	Journeyman	Tanna Bloom	Episode: "Friendly Skies"	
2010	Agatha Christie's Poirot	Mary Debenham	Episode: "Murder on the Orient Express"	
2016	Animals.	Sarah	Voice; episode: "Turkeys"	
2018	Saturday Night Live	Herself	Episode: "Jessica Chastain / Troye Sivan"	
2021	Scenes from a Marriage	Mira Phillips	Miniseries; lead role and executive producer	
2022	Reframed: Marilyn Monroe	Narrator	Documentary miniseries	
2022–2023	George & Tammy	Tammy Wynette	Miniseries; lead role and executive producer	
2027	The Savant †	Jodi Goodwin	Miniseries; lead role and executive producer	
TBA	The Off Weeks †	Stella West	Miniseries; lead role and executive producer	

== Theater ==
Year	Production	Role	Playwright	Venue	Notes	Ref.
1998	Romeo and Juliet	Juliet Capulet	William Shakespeare	Mountain View Center	California	
2004	The Cherry Orchard	Anya	Anton Chekov	Williamstown Theatre Festival	Massachusetts	
2004	Rodney's Wife	Lee	Richard Nelson	Playwrights Horizons	Off-Broadway	
2006	Salome	Salome	Oscar Wilde	Wadsworth Theatre	California	
2009	Othello	Desdemona	William Shakespeare	The Public Theater	Off-Broadway	
2012	The Heiress	Catherine Sloper	Ruth and Augustus Goetz	Walter Kerr Theatre	Broadway	
2017	The Children's Monologues	13-year-old girl	Various	Carnegie Hall	New York	
2023	A Doll's House	Nora Helmer	Henrik Ibsen	Hudson Theatre	Broadway	
2027	Lost Lear	Joy	Dan Colley	TBA	Broadway	

== Music video ==
Year	Title	Performer(s)	Album	Ref.
2017	"Family Feud"	Jay-Z (featuring Beyoncé)	4:44	

== Podcast ==
Year	Title	Role	Platform	Note	Ref.
2023	The Space Within	Dr. Madeline Wyle	Audible	Also executive producer	

== Virtual reality ==
Year	Title	Role	Release	Note	Ref.
2018	Spheres: Songs of Spacetime	Narrator	Oculus Rift	Also executive producer	

== Discography ==
Year	Title	Album	Ref.
2021	"Battle Hymn of the Republic"	The Eyes of Tammy Faye (Original Motion Picture Soundtrack)	
2021	"Jesus Keeps Takin' Me Higher & Higher"	The Eyes of Tammy Faye (Original Motion Picture Soundtrack)	
2021	"The Sun Will Shine Again"	The Eyes of Tammy Faye (Original Motion Picture Soundtrack)	
2021	"Somebody Touched Me"	The Eyes of Tammy Faye (Original Motion Picture Soundtrack)	
2021	"We are Blest"	The Eyes of Tammy Faye (Original Motion Picture Soundtrack)	
2021	"Don't Give Up (On the Brink of a Miracle)"	The Eyes of Tammy Faye (Original Motion Picture Soundtrack)	
2021	"Puppet Medley (Give a Hug, Jesus Loves Me, Up with a Giggle)"	The Eyes of Tammy Faye (Original Motion Picture Soundtrack)	
2022	"The Race is On"	George & Tammy (Original Series Soundtrack)	
2022	"White Lightning"	George & Tammy (Original Series Soundtrack)	
2022	"Apartment No. 9"	George & Tammy (Original Series Soundtrack)	
2022	"Your Good Girl’s Gonna Go Bad"	George & Tammy (Original Series Soundtrack)	
2022	"Why Baby Why"	George & Tammy (Original Series Soundtrack)	
2022	"D-I-V-O-R-C-E"	George & Tammy (Original Series Soundtrack)	
2022	"A Girl I Used to Know"	George & Tammy (Original Series Soundtrack)	
2022	"Rollin’ in My Sweet Baby's Arms"	George & Tammy (Original Series Soundtrack)	
2022	"Stand By Your Man"	George & Tammy (Original Series Soundtrack)	
2022	"Take Me"	George & Tammy (Original Series Soundtrack)	
2022	"I Don’t Wanna Play House"	George & Tammy (Original Series Soundtrack)	
2022	"Beneath Still Waters"	George & Tammy (Original Series Soundtrack)	
2022	"Something to Brag About"	George & Tammy (Original Series Soundtrack)	
2022	"We’re Gonna Hold On"	George & Tammy (Original Series Soundtrack)	
2022	"Run, Woman, Run"	George & Tammy (Original Series Soundtrack)	
2022	"The Grand Tour"	George & Tammy (Original Series Soundtrack)	
2022	"‘Til I Get It Right"	George & Tammy (Original Series Soundtrack)	
2022	"We Go Together"	George & Tammy (Original Series Soundtrack)	
2022	"You and Me"	George & Tammy (Original Series Soundtrack)	
2022	"Two Story House"	George & Tammy (Original Series Soundtrack)	
2022	"The Door"	George & Tammy (Original Series Soundtrack)	
2022	"He Stopped Loving Her Today"	George & Tammy (Original Series Soundtrack)	
2022	"Golden Ring"	George & Tammy (Original Series Soundtrack)	
2022	"Help Me Make It Through the Night"	George & Tammy (Original Series Soundtrack)	
2022	"Lost Highway"	George & Tammy (Original Series Soundtrack)	

== See also ==
- List of awards and nominations received by Jessica Chastain
