= List of awards and nominations received by Jessica Chastain =

Jessica Chastain awards and nominations
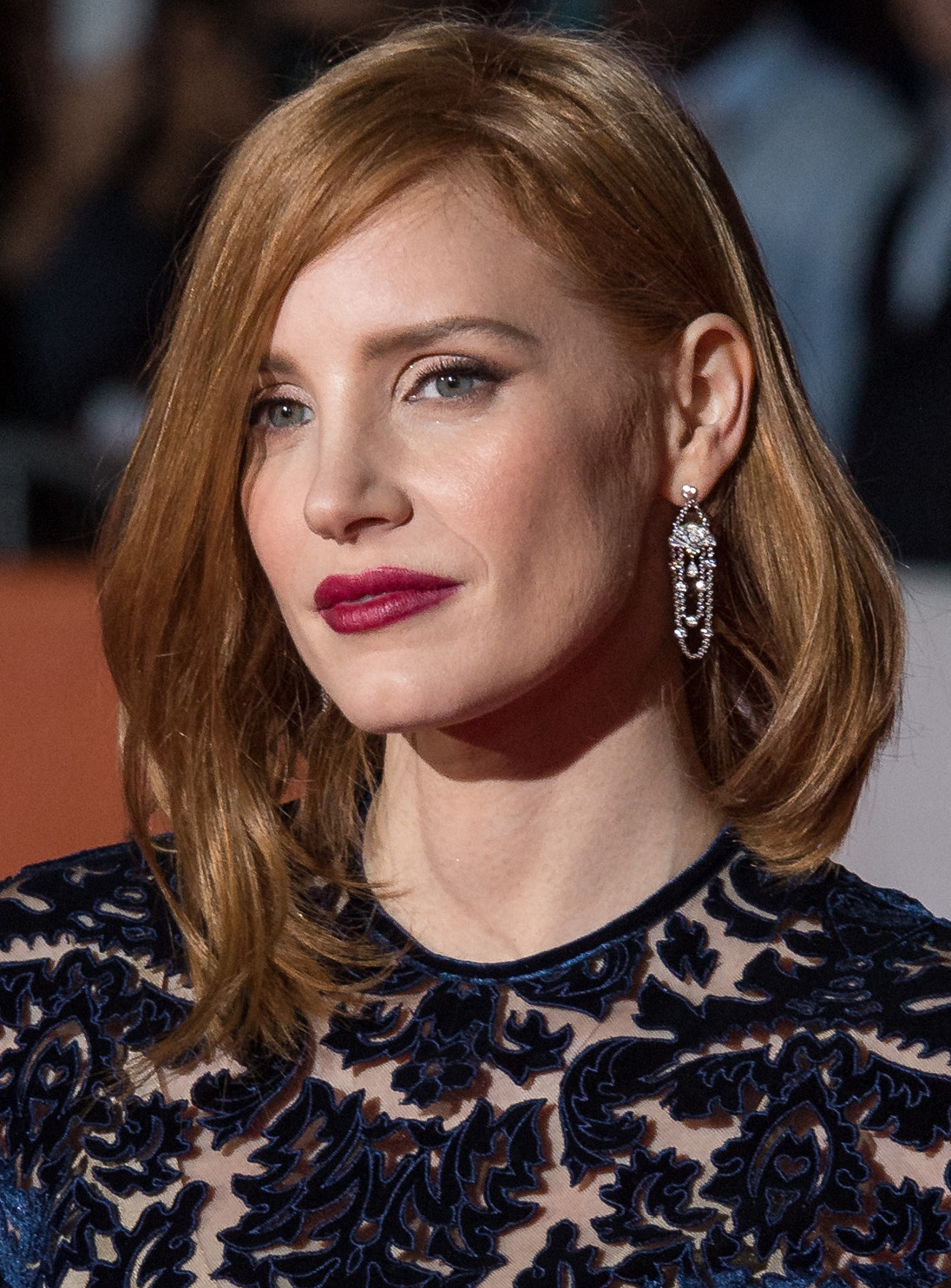
- Chastain at the 2015 Toronto International Film Festival
Awards and nominations
Award	Wins	Nominations
Academy Awards	1	3
Actor Awards	3	5
BAFTA Awards	0	2
Critics' Choice Awards	4	6
Emmy Awards	0	1
Golden Globe Awards	1	8
Tony Awards	0	2

Totals (Note: Certain award groups do not simply award one winner. They acknowledge several different recipients, have runners-up, and have third place. Since this is a specific recognition and is different from losing an award, runner-up mentions are considered wins in this award tally. For simplification and to avoid errors, each award in this list has been presumed to have had a prior nomination.)
- Wins: 61
- Nominations: 132

American actress Jessica Chastain made her film debut with the 2008 independent drama Jolene, for which she won a Best Actress award at the Seattle International Film Festival. Her breakthrough came in 2011, when she starred in six films, and received critical acclaim for her performances in Take Shelter, The Tree of Life, and The Help. The supporting role of an aspiring socialite in The Help earned her nominations for the Academy Award, Screen Actors Guild Award, BAFTA Award, Critics' Choice and Golden Globe. The following year, Chastain played the leading role of a CIA agent in Kathryn Bigelow's thriller Zero Dark Thirty, which won her the Golden Globe Award for Best Actress – Motion Picture Drama and the Critics' Choice Movie Award for Best Actress. She once again received nominations for an Academy Award, a Screen Actors Guild Award and the BAFTA Award.

The part of an unrelenting wife in the crime film A Most Violent Year (2014) garnered Chastain the National Board of Review Award for Best Supporting Actress, and another Golden Globe nomination. For playing an astrophysicist in Christopher Nolan's science fiction film Interstellar (2014), and a mysterious woman in Guillermo del Toro's gothic horror film Crimson Peak (2015), she received nominations for the Saturn Award for Best Supporting Actress, winning the award for the latter. Also in 2015, she received a nomination for the Saturn Award for Best Actress for her role as an astronaut in the science fiction film The Martian. Further Golden Globe nominations came for her portrayals of strong-willed titular characters in the dramas Miss Sloane (2016) and Molly's Game (2017), and an unhappily married woman in the miniseries Scenes from a Marriage (2021).

In 2021, Chastain starred in the biopic The Eyes of Tammy Faye as the televangelist Tammy Faye, for which she won the Academy Award, Screen Actors Guild Award, and Critics' Choice Award for Best Actress. She won another Screen Actors Guild Award and earned her first nomination for a Primetime Emmy Award for portraying the country singer Tammy Wynette in the miniseries George & Tammy (2022). For starring in a 2023 Broadway revival of A Doll's House, Chastain won the Drama Desk Award for Outstanding Lead Performance in a Play, and was nominated for the Tony Award for Best Actress in a Play.

== Major associations ==
=== Academy Awards ===
Year	Category	Nominated work	Result	Ref.
2012	Best Supporting Actress	The Help	Nominated	
2013	Best Actress	Zero Dark Thirty	Nominated	
2022	Best Actress	The Eyes of Tammy Faye	Won	

=== Actor Awards ===
Year	Category	Nominated work	Result	Ref.
2012	Outstanding Female Actor in a Supporting Role	The Help	Nominated	
2012	Outstanding Cast in a Motion Picture	The Help	Won (Note: Shared with the cast)	
2013	Outstanding Female Actor in a Leading Role	Zero Dark Thirty	Nominated	
2022	Outstanding Female Actor in a Leading Role	The Eyes of Tammy Faye	Won	
2023	Outstanding Female Actor in a Miniseries or Television Movie	George & Tammy	Won	

=== BAFTA Awards ===
Year	Category	Nominated work	Result	Ref.
British Academy Film Awards
2012	Best Actress in a Supporting Role	The Help	Nominated	
2013	Best Actress in a Leading Role	Zero Dark Thirty	Nominated	

=== Critics' Choice Awards ===
Year	Category	Nominated work	Result	Ref.
Film
2012	Best Supporting Actress	The Help	Nominated	
2012	Best Acting Ensemble	The Help	Won	
2013	Best Actress	Zero Dark Thirty	Won	
2015	Best Supporting Actress	A Most Violent Year	Nominated	
2015	MVP Award	The Disappearance of Eleanor Rigby	Honored	
2015	MVP Award	Interstellar	Honored	
2015	MVP Award	Miss Julie	Honored	
2015	MVP Award	A Most Violent Year	Honored	
2018	Best Actress	Molly's Game	Nominated	
2022	Best Actress	The Eyes of Tammy Faye	Won	

=== Emmy Awards ===
Year	Category	Nominated work	Result	Ref.
Primetime Emmy Awards
2023	Outstanding Lead Actress in a Limited or Anthology Series or Movie	George & Tammy	Nominated	

=== Golden Globe Awards ===
Year	Category	Nominated work	Result	Ref.
2012	Best Supporting Actress – Motion Picture	The Help	Nominated	
2013	Best Actress in a Motion Picture – Drama	Zero Dark Thirty	Won	
2015	Best Supporting Actress – Motion Picture	A Most Violent Year	Nominated	
2017	Best Actress in a Motion Picture – Drama	Miss Sloane	Nominated	
2018	Best Actress in a Motion Picture – Drama	Molly's Game	Nominated	
2022	Best Actress in a Motion Picture – Drama	The Eyes of Tammy Faye	Nominated	
2022	Best Actress – Miniseries or Television Film	Scenes from a Marriage	Nominated	
2023	Best Actress – Miniseries or Television Film	George & Tammy	Nominated	

=== Tony Awards ===
Year	Category	Nominated work	Result	Ref.
2023	Best Actress in a Play	A Doll's House	Nominated	
2023	Best Revival of a Play	A Doll's House	Nominated (Note: As a producer)	

== Other awards ==
=== Black Reel Awards ===
Year	Category	Nominated work	Result	Ref.
2012	Outstanding Ensemble	The Help	Won	

=== Independent Spirit Awards ===
Year	Category	Nominated work	Result	Ref.
2012	Best Supporting Female	Take Shelter	Nominated	
2015	Best Supporting Female	A Most Violent Year	Nominated	
2024	Best Lead Performance	Memory	Nominated	

=== Irish Film & Television Awards ===
Year	Category	Nominated work	Result	Ref.
2015	Best International Actress	Miss Julie	Nominated	

=== Gotham Awards ===
Year	Category	Nominated work	Result	Ref.
2011	Best Ensemble Performance	Take Shelter	Nominated	

=== National Board of Review ===
Year	Category	Nominated work	Result	Ref.
2011	Best Cast	The Help	Won	
2012	Best Actress	Zero Dark Thirty	Won	
2014	Best Supporting Actress	A Most Violent Year	Won	

=== Satellite Awards ===
Year	Category	Nominated work	Result	Ref.
2011	Best Supporting Actress	The Tree of Life	Won	
2011	Best Ensemble – Motion Picture	The Help	Won	
2012	Best Actress – Motion Picture - Drama	Zero Dark Thirty	Nominated	
2018	Best Actress – Motion Picture - Drama	Molly's Game	Nominated	
2022	Best Actress – Motion Picture - Drama	The Eyes of Tammy Faye	Nominated	
2023	Best Actress – Motion Picture - Drama	The Good Nurse	Nominated	

=== Venice Film Festival ===
Year	Category	Nominated work	Result	Ref.
2011	Gucci Award for Women in Cinema	The Tree of Life	Won	

== Other associations ==
Award/Organization	Year	Category	Work	Result	Ref.
AACTA Awards	2013	Best Actress	Zero Dark Thirty	Nominated	
Alliance of Women Film Journalists	2012	Best Supporting Actress	The Help	Nominated	
Alliance of Women Film Journalists	2012	Best Ensemble Cast	The Help	Nominated	
Alliance of Women Film Journalists	2012	Best Breakthrough Performance	The Tree of Life	Nominated	
Alliance of Women Film Journalists	2012	Outstanding Achievement by a Woman in the Film Industry	—	Won	
Alliance of Women Film Journalists	2013	Best Actress	Zero Dark Thirty	Won	
Alliance of Women Film Journalists	2013	Humanitarian Activism – Female Icon Award	Zero Dark Thirty	Won	
Alliance of Women Film Journalists	2013	Unforgettable Moment Award	Zero Dark Thirty	Won (Note: Tied with Anne Hathaway for Les Misérables)	
Alliance of Women Film Journalists	2016	Bravest Performance Award	Miss Sloane	Nominated	
Alliance of Women Film Journalists	2022	Best Actress	The Eyes of Tammy Faye	Nominated	
American Cinematheque	2024	American Cinematheque Award	—	Won	
Astra TV Awards	2023	Best Actress in a Broadcast Network or Cable Limited or Anthology Series	George & Tammy	Won	
Austin Film Critics Association	2011	Best Supporting Actress	Take Shelter	Won	
Austin Film Critics Association	2011	Breakthrough Artist Award	Coriolanus; The Debt; The Help; Take Shelter; Texas Killing Fields; The Tree of Life	Won	
Chicago Film Critics Association	2011	Best Supporting Actress	The Tree of Life	Won	
Chicago Film Critics Association	2012	Best Actress	Zero Dark Thirty	Won	
Chicago Film Critics Association	2014	Best Supporting Actress	A Most Violent Year	Nominated	
Chicago Film Critics Association	2022	Best Actress	The Eyes of Tammy Faye	Nominated	
Dallas–Fort Worth Film Critics Association	2012	Best Actress	Zero Dark Thirty	Won	
Dallas–Fort Worth Film Critics Association	2014	Best Supporting Actress	A Most Violent Year	4th place	
Deauville American Film Festival	2011	New Hollywood Award	—	Won	
Deauville American Film Festival	2014	Career Tribute	—	Won	
Detroit Film Critics Society	2011	Best Supporting Actress	Take Shelter	Nominated	
Detroit Film Critics Society	2011	Best Ensemble	The Help	Nominated	
Detroit Film Critics Society	2011	Breakthrough Performance	The Help; Take Shelter; The Tree of Life	Won	
Detroit Film Critics Society	2012	Best Actress	Zero Dark Thirty	Nominated	
Detroit Film Critics Society	2017	Best Actress	Molly's Game	Nominated	
Detroit Film Critics Society	2021	Best Actress	The Eyes of Tammy Faye	Won	
Dorian Awards	2012	We're Wilde About You Rising Star Award	—	Nominated	
Dorian Awards	2013	Film Performance of the Year – Actress	Zero Dark Thirty	Nominated	
Drama Desk Award	2023	Outstanding Lead Performance in a Play	A Doll's House	Won (Note: Tied with Sean Hayes for Good Night, Oscar)	
Drama League Award	2023	Distinguished Performance	A Doll's House	Nominated	
Drama League Award	2023	Best Revival of a Play	A Doll's House (as a producer)	Won	
Dublin Film Critics Circle	2011	Best Actress	The Tree of Life	Won	
Dublin Film Critics Circle	2011	International Breakthrough	The Help; Take Shelter; The Tree of Life	Won	
Empire Awards	2013	Best Actress	Zero Dark Thirty	Nominated	
Fangoria Chainsaw Awards	2016	Best Supporting Actress	Crimson Peak	Won	
Florida Film Critics Circle	2012	Best Actress	Zero Dark Thirty	Won	
Florida Film Critics Circle	2014	Best Supporting Actress	A Most Violent Year	Nominated	
Georgia Film Critics Association	2012	Best Supporting Actress	The Tree of Life	Won	
Georgia Film Critics Association	2012	Breakthrough Awards	—	Won	
Georgia Film Critics Association	2013	Best Actress	Zero Dark Thirty	Nominated	
Georgia Film Critics Association	2015	Best Actress	A Most Violent Year	Nominated	
Georgia Film Critics Association	2018	Best Actress	Molly's Game	Nominated	
Golden Raspberry Awards	2020	Worst Supporting Actress	Dark Phoenix	Nominated	
Hollywood Film Awards	2011	Ensemble of the Year	The Help	Won	
Houston Film Critics Society	2011	Best Supporting Actress	The Help	Nominated	
Houston Film Critics Society	2012	Best Actress	Zero Dark Thirty	Nominated	
Houston Film Critics Society	2014	Best Supporting Actress	A Most Violent Year	Nominated	
Houston Film Critics Society	2021	Best Actress	The Eyes of Tammy Faye	Won	
London Film Critics Circle	2011	Supporting Actress of the Year	The Help	Nominated	
London Film Critics Circle	2012	Actress of the Year	Zero Dark Thirty	Nominated	
London Film Critics Circle	2014	Supporting Actress of the Year	A Most Violent Year	Nominated	
Los Angeles Film Critics Association	2011	Best Supporting Actress	Coriolanus; The Debt; The Help; Take Shelter; Texas Killing Fields; The Tree of Life	Won	
MTV Movie Awards	2012	Best Cast	The Help	Nominated	
MTV Movie Awards	2013	Best Scared-As-S**t Performance	Zero Dark Thirty	Nominated	
MTV Movie Awards	2014	Best Scared-As-S**t Performance	Mama	Nominated	
National Society of Film Critics	2012	Best Supporting Actress	The Help; Take Shelter; The Tree of Life	Won	
National Society of Film Critics	2013	Best Actress	Zero Dark Thirty	Runner-up (Note: Tied with Jennifer Lawrence for Silver Linings Playbook)	
New York Film Critics Circle	2011	Best Supporting Actress	The Help; Take Shelter; The Tree of Life	Won	
New York Film Critics Online	2011	Breakthrough Performer	The Debt; The Help; Take Shelter; The Tree of Life	Won	
Online Film Critics Society	2012	Best Supporting Actress	The Tree of Life	Won	
Online Film Critics Society	2012	Best Breakthrough Performance	—	Won	
Online Film Critics Society	2013	Best Actress	Zero Dark Thirty	Won	
Online Film Critics Society	2014	Best Supporting Actress	A Most Violent Year	Nominated	
Palm Springs International Film Festival	2011	Spotlight Award	Coriolanus; The Debt; The Help; Take Shelter; The Tree of Life	Won	
Palm Springs International Film Festival	2018	Chairman's Award	Molly's Game	Won	
Palm Springs International Film Festival	2021	Desert Palm Achievement Award - Actress	The Eyes of Tammy Faye	Won	
Outer Critics Circle Award	2023	Outstanding Lead Performer in a Broadway Play	A Doll's House	Nominated	
San Diego Film Critics Society	2011	Body of Work	—	Won	
San Diego Film Critics Society	2011	Best Supporting Actress	The Help	Nominated	
San Diego Film Critics Society	2011	Best Ensemble	The Help	Nominated	
San Diego Film Critics Society	2012	Best Actress	Zero Dark Thirty	Nominated	
San Francisco Film Critics Circle	2014	Best Supporting Actress	A Most Violent Year	Nominated	
San Sebastián International Film Festival	2021	Silver Shell for Best Leading Performance	The Eyes of Tammy Faye	Won	
Saturn Awards	2012	Best Actress	Take Shelter	Nominated	
Saturn Awards	2013	Best Actress	Zero Dark Thirty	Nominated	
Saturn Awards	2015	Best Supporting Actress	Interstellar	Nominated	
Saturn Awards	2016	Best Actress	The Martian	Nominated	
Saturn Awards	2016	Best Supporting Actress	Crimson Peak	Won	
Seattle International Film Festival	2008	Best Actress	Jolene	Won	
St. Louis Film Critics Association	2011	Best Supporting Actress	The Tree of Life	Nominated	
St. Louis Film Critics Association	2012	Best Actress	Zero Dark Thirty	Won	
St. Louis Film Critics Association	2014	Best Supporting Actress	A Most Violent Year	Nominated	
St. Louis Film Critics Association	2021	Best Actress	The Eyes of Tammy Faye	Won	
Teen Choice Awards	2016	Choice Movie Actress: Drama	The Martian	Nominated	
Teen Choice Awards	2016	Choice Movie: Liplock	The Huntsman: Winter's War	Nominated	
Toronto Film Critics Association	2011	Best Supporting Actress	Take Shelter	Won	
Toronto Film Critics Association	2011	Best Supporting Actress	The Tree of Life	Runner-up (Note: Tied with Shailene Woodley for The Descendants)	
Toronto Film Critics Association	2012	Best Actress	Zero Dark Thirty	Runner-up (Note: Tied with Emmanuelle Riva for Amour)	
Toronto International Film Festival	2021	TIFF Tribute Award	—	Won	
Vancouver Film Critics Circle	2012	Best Supporting Actress	The Help; Take Shelter; The Tree of Life	Won	
Vancouver Film Critics Circle	2013	Best Actress	Zero Dark Thirty	Won	
Vancouver Film Critics Circle	2015	Best Supporting Actress	A Most Violent Year	Nominated	
Vancouver Film Critics Circle	2022	Best Actress	The Eyes of Tammy Faye	Nominated	
Village Voice Film Poll	2011	Best Supporting Actress	Take Shelter	3rd place	
Village Voice Film Poll	2012	Best Actress	Zero Dark Thirty	3rd place	
Washington D.C. Area Film Critics Association	2011	Best Ensemble	The Help	Nominated	
Washington D.C. Area Film Critics Association	2012	Best Ensemble	Zero Dark Thirty	Nominated	
Washington D.C. Area Film Critics Association	2012	Best Actress	Zero Dark Thirty	Won	
Washington D.C. Area Film Critics Association	2014	Best Supporting Actress	A Most Violent Year	Nominated	
Women Film Critics Circle	2011	Best Female Ensemble	The Help	Won	
Women Film Critics Circle	2011	Best Actress	The Debt; The Help	Nominated	
Women Film Critics Circle	2014	Woman's Right to Male Roles in Movies	Interstellar	Won	
Women Film Critics Circle	2017	The Invisible Woman Award	The Zookeeper's Wife	Nominated	
Zurich Film Festival	2023	Golden Icon Award	—	Won	
