= Jessamine Chan =

American author

- Education: Brown University (BA); Columbia University (MFA)
- Spouse: Adam Diller

Jessamine Chan is an American novelist and the author of The School for Good Mothers.

== Personal life and education ==
Chan is a first-generation Chinese-American. She grew up in Oak Park, a suburb of Chicago, as the daughter of Chinese professors who met in the US. Her mother is from Taiwan, and her father is from mainland China. She received her bachelor's degree from Brown University, followed by a Master of Fine Arts degree from Columbia University.

She currently lives in Chicago with her husband and daughter.

== Career ==
After graduating from Brown, Chan moved to New York City to work as an editor of nonfiction reviews for Publishers Weekly. Later, she moved to Chicago and worked as editor of a research digest for University of Chicago’s graduate business school before beginning her MFA at Columbia.

=== The School for Good Mothers ===
Chan's debut novel, The School for Good Mothers, was published in 2022 by Simon & Schuster. The dystopian novel was inspired by a nonfiction New Yorker article in which a mother lost parental rights. She started writing the book in 2014. It was the Today Show's "Read with Jenna" book club pick when the book came out. The book was a finalist for the 2023 John Leonard Prize, awarded by the National Book Critics Circle for a first book in any genre.

In 2022, Jessica Chastain's production company Freckle Films bought the TV rights to the book, with plans for Jude Weng to direct the TV adaptation. Chan will serve as an executive producer for the show.

Chan spent three years living in South Philadelphia with her husband and daughter, providing material for her debut novel.

== Published works ==
- —— (2022). The School for Good Mothers. New York: Simon & Schuster. ISBN 9781982156121.
