= The School for Good Mothers =

2022 novel by Jessamine Chan

- First edition paperback cover of The School for Good Mothers by Jessamine Chan
- Author: Jessamine Chan
- Language: English
- Publisher: Simon & Schuster
- Publication date: January 4, 2022
- Publication place: United States
- Pages: 336
- ISBN: 979-8-200-91293-3

The School for Good Mothers is a 2022 debut novel by American writer Jessamine Chan, published by Simon & Schuster. The novel concerns a woman, Frida, who is sentenced to a period at an experimental facility intended to rehabilitate mothers accused of even minor parenting infractions.

== Writing and composition ==
Chan began writing the novel in 2014. Chan was inspired to write about motherhood and parenting due to her anxiety over whether or not to have a child. Two articles published in The New Yorker, one by Rachel Aviv concerning a mother's experience with family courts, and a second by Margaret Talbot about an effort in Providence to close the "word gap", both informed Chan as she wrote the story. The novel includes a large cast of characters, and Chan found creating unique, full-fledged personalities for the mothers at the titular facility "quite challenging". Chan set portions of the novel in Philadelphia, where she lived before moving to Chicago during the COVID-19 pandemic.

Chan and her agent, Kaffel Simonoff, revised the novel together before submitting it to publishers.

== Critical reception ==
In a positive review for The New York Times Book Review, Molly Young wrote that the novel "recalls" works by Kazuo Ishiguro and Philip K. Dick, qualifying that nonetheless "[...] Chan’s novel is too original to come off as a purée of influences."

The School for Good Mothers has received comparisons, due to its subject matter and thematic content, to the novel The Handmaid's Tale by Canadian author Margaret Atwood. Chan has said the comparisons are "thrilling beyond [her] wildest dreams".

The novel was longlisted for the 2023 Andrew Carnegie Medal for Excellence in Fiction.

== Adaptation ==
Through her production company, Freckle Films, actress and producer Jessica Chastain purchased the rights to adapt the novel as a television series. Jude Weng will direct the show.
