= Freckle Films =

American film and television production company

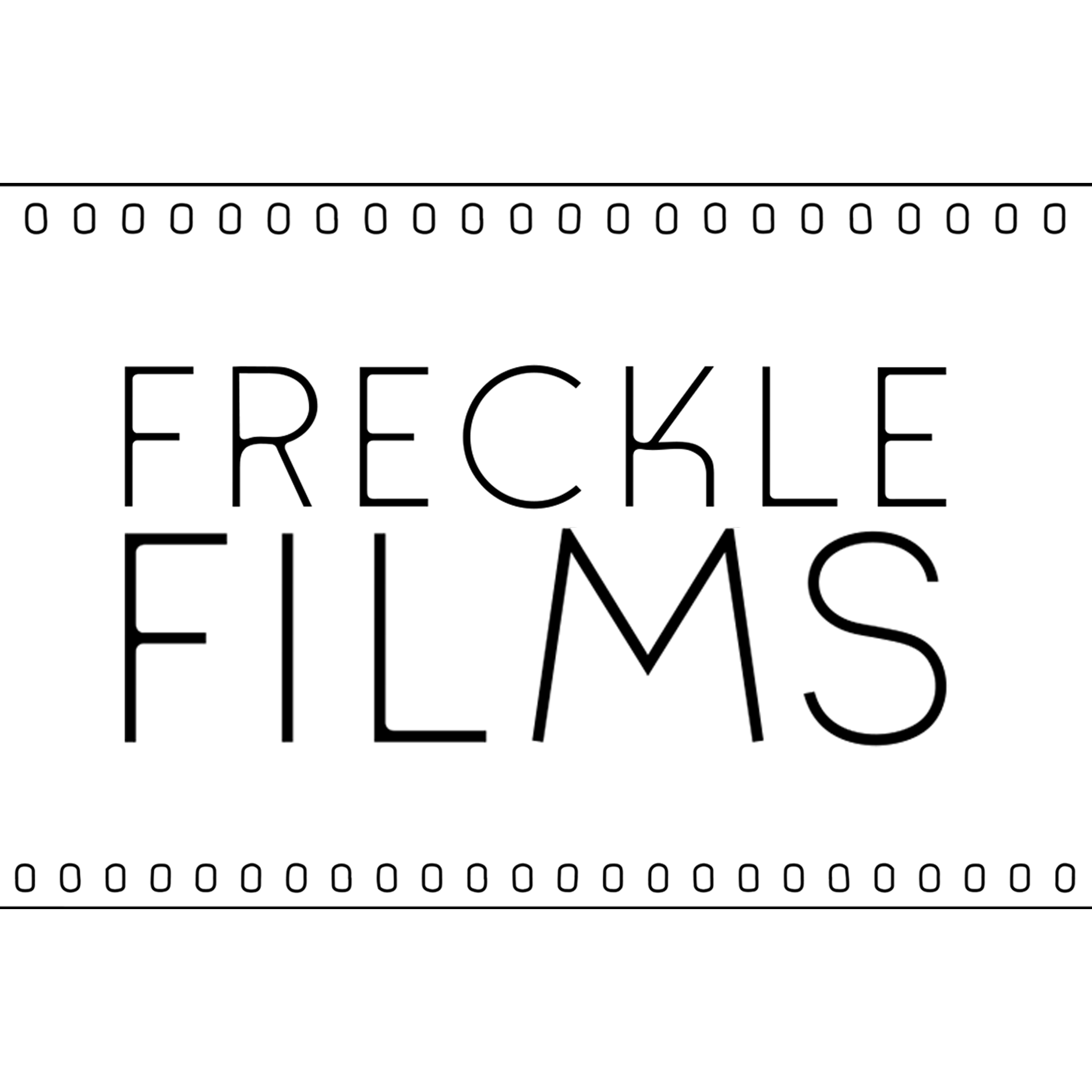
- Company type: Private
- Industry: Production company
- Founded: 2016
- Founder: Jessica Chastain
- Headquarters: New York, United States
- Key people: Clemens Pongratz, Leili Gerami (executive producers) Kelly Carmichael (president of production and development)
- Products: Film production; Television shows

Freckle Films is an American film and television production company. It was founded by Jessica Chastain in 2016. The company's projects include the biopics The Eyes of Tammy Faye (2021) and George & Tammy (2022), both starring Chastain.

== History ==
In February 2016, it was reported that Chastain had launched her company. In May 2017, Kelly Carmichael became a president of production and development. Carmichael, who had previously worked at Miramax and at The Weinstein Company as a production executive.

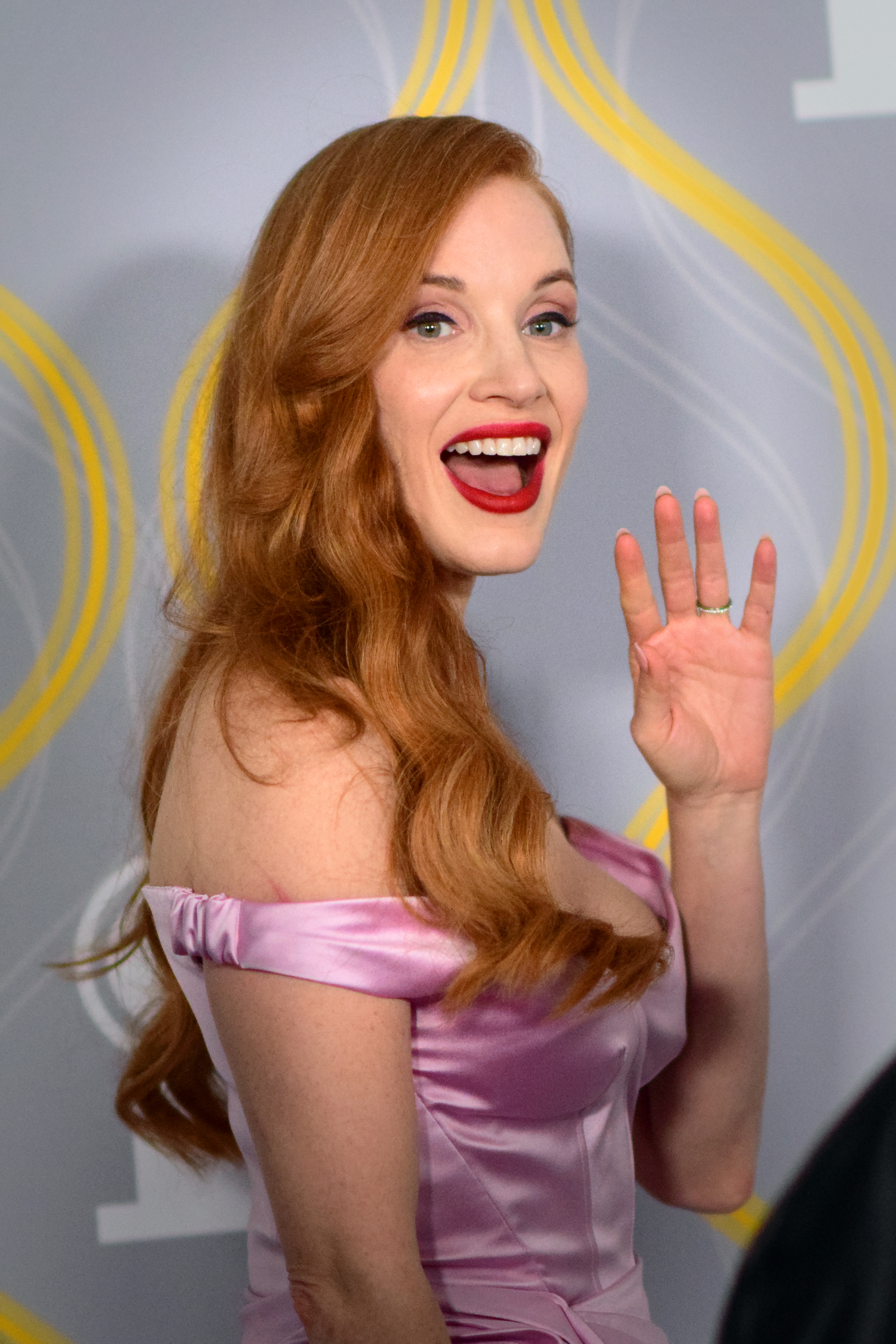
Chastain in 2022

Under Freckle Films, Chastain produced and starred in the action film Ava (2020), written and initially set to be directed by Matthew Newton, who has been accused of domestic violence. Following backlash against her for agreeing to work with him, Newton was replaced with Tate Taylor. Boyd van Hoeij of The Hollywood Reporter bemoaned that Chastain's talents as an action star had been wasted in an underwhelming film. Released theatrically during the COVID-19 pandemic, it performed poorly at the box office but gained success on video on demand. The film was released in Hungary on July 2, 2020. It was released in the United States through DirecTV Cinema on August 27, 2020, followed by video on demand on September 25, 2020, by Vertical Entertainment. It received a DVD and Blu-ray release in Australia on September 2, 2020, by Madman Entertainment. It began streaming on Netflix on December 6, 2020. It was the third most-watched film on the site on its first day of release and finished first in its second day. It went on to become the top-streamed film over its first weekend. In Hungary, the film made $31,820 from 59 theaters in its opening weekend, finishing first at the box office. The film grossed a total of $3.3 million worldwide. In its debut weekend in the U.S., Ava was the most rented film on Apple TV and Google Play, and second on FandangoNow. In its second weekend the film topped Apple TV, Google Play, and Spectrum, and remained second at FandangoNow. IndieWire described the performance of Ava as "the best showing for a non-premium title in the six months we've covered weekly VOD performance."

The company then entered production on The Eyes of Tammy Faye, starring Chastain and Andrew Garfield. The Eyes of Tammy Faye had its world premiere at the Toronto International Film Festival in September 2021, and was released on September 17, 2021, by Searchlight Pictures. To look like Bakker, Chastain wore prosthetic makeup which took 4–7 hours to apply. The role also required her to sing, which she has said made her nervous. She worked with the music producer Dave Cobb to record seven songs for the film's soundtrack. David Fear of Rolling Stone found Chastain to be the "only reason to see this curiously tepid biopic" and praised her for rising above the script to humanize Bakker. Kevin Maher of The Times considered it to be a "riveting, unleashed and award-worthy performance" and compared it to Joaquin Phoenix's performance in Joker (2019). Critics praised the performances (particularly Chastain's) while criticizing the screenplay, deeming the film to be inferior to the documentary. At the 94th Academy Awards the film won Best Actress (for Chastain) and Best Makeup and Hairstyling. Chastain also won the SAG Award and Critics' Choice Movie Award for Best Actress.

In 2018, Chastain and a group of international actresses travelled to Cannes Film Festival to pitch an all female ensemble spy film, The 355. Universal Pictures acquired the rights to the film at $20 million. It was released on January 7, 2022. In 2022, the company purchased the rights to adapt the novel The School for Good Mothers as a television series.

Freckle Films and Chastain then executive produced the Showtime biographical miniseries George & Tammy, in which she played the country singer Tammy Wynette opposite Michael Shannon's George Jones. In preparation, Chastain and Shannon trained with a vocal coach to sing several of their character's songs. She also lost weight to play Wynette toward the end of her life. Emma Fraser of The Playlist was appreciate of the chemistry between the actors, and took note of the "fragility and toughness" in Chastain's portrayal. The series had strong viewership across various platforms, marking a high for a Showtime original series in multi-platform era. She won another SAG Award, a Golden Globe nomination and earned her first nomination for the Primetime Emmy Awards for Outstanding Lead Actress in a Limited or Anthology Series or Movie; the series also received three other nominations.

== Filmography ==
=== Films ===
Year	Film title	Director	Gross (worldwide)	Notes
2020	Ava	Tate Taylor	$3.3 million	
2021	The Eyes of Tammy Faye	Michael Showalter	$2.7 million	Academy Award wins for Best Actress in a Leading Role & Best Makeup and Hairstyling
2022	The 355	Simon Kinberg	$27.8 million	
2024	Mothers' Instinct	Benoît Delhomme	$3.4 million	
2025	Dreams	Michel Franco		

=== Television series ===
Year	Film title	Network	Notes
2022	George & Tammy	Showtime	Miniseries; Four Primetime Emmy Awards nominations.
2026	His & Hers	Netflix	Miniseries

=== Upcoming projects ===
- The Division
- The Savant
