= George & Tammy =

US television series

- Genre: Drama; Biopic; Musical
- Created by: Abe Sylvia
- Based on: The Three of Us: Growing Up with Tammy and George by Georgette Jones
- Directed by: John Hillcoat
- Starring: Jessica Chastain; Michael Shannon; Steve Zahn; David Wilson Barnes; Walton Goggins
- Opening theme: "The World's Most Broken Heart" by Tammy Wynette
- Country of origin: United States
- Original language: English
- No. of episodes: 6

Production
- Executive producers: Jessica Chastain; Kelly Carmichael; Abe Sylvia; Andrew Lazar; Josh Brolin; David C. Glasser; David Hutkin; Bob Yari; Bryan Goluboff; Ron Burkle; John Hillcoat
- Cinematography: Igor Martinovic
- Editor: Katharine McQuerrey
- Production companies: Freckle Films; 101 Studios; MTV Entertainment Studios; Mad Chance Productions; Blank Films Inc; Aunt Sylvia's Moving Picture Company; Brolin Productions

Original release
- Network: Showtime
- Release: December 4, 2022 – January 8, 2023

George & Tammy is an American biographical drama miniseries created by Abe Sylvia and directed by John Hillcoat, that premiered on Showtime on December 4, 2022. It stars Jessica Chastain and Michael Shannon as country musicians Tammy Wynette and George Jones, chronicling their tumultuous relationship and intertwined careers.

The series received a positive critical reception, particularly for the performances of Chastain and Shannon. For her role, Chastain received a nomination for Best Actress – Miniseries or Television Film at the 80th Golden Globe Awards and won the Screen Actors Guild Award for Outstanding Performance by a Female Actor in a Miniseries or Television Movie at the 29th Screen Actors Guild Awards.

== Cast and characters ==
- Jessica Chastain as Tammy Wynette
- Michael Shannon as George Jones
- Steve Zahn as George Richey
- Walton Goggins as Earl "Peanutt" Montgomery
- David Wilson Barnes as Billy Sherrill
- Kelly McCormack as Sheila Richey
- Katy Mixon as Jan Smith
- Robert Morgan as Pappy Daily
- Hendrix Yancey as Gwen, ages 8–10
- John Teer as Harold Bradley
- Tim Blake Nelson as Roy Acuff
- Joshua C. Allen as Lou Bradley
- Kate Arrington as Charlene Montgomery
- Pat Healy as Don Chapel
- Bobbie Eakes as Nan Smith
- Abby Glover as Georgette Jones
- Ian Lyons as Paul Richey
- GiGi Erneta as Nancy Sepulvado
- Vivie Myrick as Donna Chapel
- Zachariah Malachi as Charlie Justice
- Jamie Dick as Freddie Haws

== Production ==
=== Development ===
In February 2016, Josh Brolin announced that he and Chastain would play George Jones and Tammy Wynette in a biographical film. In September 2020, it was announced the film would instead be a limited series, based on the book The Three of Us: Growing Up with Tammy and George by Georgette Jones, with Brolin no longer attached, instead serving as an executive producer. John Hillcoat will direct all six episodes of the series. Chastain's production company, Freckle Films is set to executive produce.

=== Casting ===
Upon the limited series announcement, Chastain was set to star as Tammy Wynette with Josh Brolin as George Jones. In December 2021, it was announced that Michael Shannon would replace Brolin due to scheduling conflicts and Steve Zahn was to play George Richey. In January 2022, Kelly McCormack and Katy Mixon joined the cast of the series, in guest starring roles.

=== Filming ===
Principal photography began on December 8, 2021, at the EUE/Screen Gems Studios in Wilmington, North Carolina

=== Music ===
Chastain and Shannon recorded their own vocals for the show and performed them live on set. When comparing the experience to her work as Tammy Faye in The Eyes of Tammy Faye, Chastain explained that she found recording Wynette's songs more intimidating than any of Bakker's catalogue. Both actors worked with vocal coach Ron Browning for months prior to filming, with Shannon stating “These songs, they’re pretty deep and they’ve got some dark corners in them, and we spent a lot of time with them. In addition to learning how to sing them, I think they also kind of taught us about who the people were and the story we were telling.” Both actors talked about how the focus was not on doing an impersonation of Jones or Wynette but of capturing certain aspects of their personality and conveying this during their performances. A soundtrack featuring songs from the show was released digitally from Sony Masterworks on December 16, 2022.

== Episodes ==
No.	Title	Directed by	Written by	Original release date	U.S. viewers (millions)
1	"The Race Is On"	John Hillcoat	Abe Sylvia	December 4, 2022	0.179
In 1967, George Jones has become infamous for missing shows due to his alcoholism. Virginia Pugh, having experienced some success on the country charts as Tammy Wynette, rushes to see him perform at the Grand Ole Opry with her husband, Don. Tammy's producer Billy Sherrill introduces Tammy to George, who agrees to have her open for him on tour, causing conflict between Tammy and Don, who pushes her to pitch his song "When the Grass Grows Over Me" for Jones to record. George watches Tammy perform "Apartment No. 9" during a soundcheck and connects to her emotional lyrics and vocal delivery. Before one of their shows, Tammy cleans up a hungover George and Don overhears him telling her that he knows she is unhappy in her marriage and accuses Don of using her talent to further his own career. In response, Don fires Tammy's band and leaves, though Jones allows Tammy to use his band as a replacement and joins her onstage to perform "Why Baby Why". Returning home, Tammy promises Don that nothing happened between her and George, who subsequently records "When the Grass Grows Over Me". At a dinner party, Don tries to assert dominance over George, who then taunts him by singing "D-I-V-O-R-C-E". When Don starts insulting Tammy, the pair begin to fight, and Tammy chooses to take her children and leave Don with George.
2	"Stand by Your Man"	John Hillcoat	Abe Sylvia	December 11, 2022	0.166
In a flashback to 1965, Tammy receives electric shock treatment after being committed to a psychiatric hospital by her mother for trying to leave her first husband. As word spreads around Nashville that George and Tammy are together, Billy Sherrill convinces George to leave his producer Pappy Daily so that he and Tammy can both be on Epic Records and they subsequently record their first duet: "Take Me". George confesses that he is afraid people will not accept their relationship but Tammy promises him they will be together forever and they marry. Their relationship gains significant media attention and causes a resurgence in George's career. George Richey reveals that Tammy's divorce from Don wasn't legal so Billy hires a lawyer to take care of it. Don later ambushes Tammy and blackmails her to pitch more of his songs to George using naked pictures he took of her, though George ultimately discovers this, attacks Don and burns the pictures. Tammy is angry when George buys a house without consulting her but he reveals that he gave their other home and all of his money to Pappy so that he could be with her on Epic. George's alcoholism continues to cause problems and he becomes violent towards Tammy. Billy then reveals that Tammy's marriage to Don was annulled because she did not wait long enough after divorcing her first husband so her marriage to George is legal after all. Tammy discloses her experiences with her first husband and George promises to quit drinking if she stays with him. Tammy and Billy subsequently write "Stand by Your Man".
3	"We're Gonna Hold On"	John Hillcoat	Sheri Holman and Bryan Goluboff	December 18, 2022	0.264
4	"The Grand Tour"	John Hillcoat	Becky Mode	December 25, 2022	0.210
5	"Two Story House"	John Hillcoat	Lindsey Villarreal and Sheri Holman & Abe Sylvia	January 1, 2023	0.056
6	"Justified & Ancient"	John Hillcoat	Abe Sylvia & Sheri Holman	January 8, 2023	N/A

== Reception ==
=== Critical response ===
The review aggregator website Rotten Tomatoes reported an 84% approval rating with an average rating of 6.9/10, based on 32 critic reviews. The website's critics consensus reads, "George & Tammy may not have the staying power of the classic songs recorded by its subjects, but this biopic benefits from a pair of well-matched and supremely committed leads." On Metacritic the series holds a score of 71 based on 23 critic reviews, indicating "generally favorable reviews".

=== Accolades ===
Year	Award	Category	Nominee(s)	Result	Ref.
2023	Golden Globe Awards	Best Actress – Miniseries or Television Film	Jessica Chastain	Nominated	
2023	Screen Actors Guild Awards	Outstanding Performance by a Female Actor in a Miniseries or Television Movie	Jessica Chastain	Won	
2023	Set Decorators Society of America Awards	Best Achievement in Décor/Design of a Television Movie or Limited Series	James V. Kent and Jonah Markowitz	Nominated	
2023	3rd Hollywood Critics Association TV Awards	Best Broadcast Network or Cable Limited Series	George & Tammy	Nominated	
2023	3rd Hollywood Critics Association TV Awards	Best Actor in a Broadcast Network or Cable Limited Series or TV Movie	Michael Shannon	Won	
2023	3rd Hollywood Critics Association TV Awards	Best Actress in a Broadcast Network or Cable Limited or TV Movie	Jessica Chastain	Won	
2023	3rd Hollywood Critics Association TV Awards	Best Casting in a Limited Series or TV Movie	George & Tammy	Nominated	
2023	Primetime Emmy Awards	Outstanding Lead Actor in a Limited or Anthology Series or Movie	Michael Shannon	Nominated	
2023	Primetime Emmy Awards	Outstanding Lead Actress in a Limited or Anthology Series or Movie	Jessica Chastain	Nominated	
2023	Primetime Emmy Awards	Outstanding Cinematography for a Limited or Anthology Series or Movie	Igor Martinovic	Nominated	
2023	Primetime Emmy Awards	Outstanding Period Costumes	Mitchell Travers, Mitchel Wolf, Laurel Rose, Aileen Abercrombie, Susan Russell and Charles Carter	Nominated	
