= Miss Sloane =

2016 film by John Madden

- Theatrical release poster
- Directed by: John Madden
- Written by: Jonathan Perera
- Produced by: Ariel Zeitoun; Ben Browning; Kris Thykier
- Starring: Jessica Chastain; Mark Strong; Gugu Mbatha-Raw; Michael Stuhlbarg; Alison Pill; Jake Lacy; John Lithgow; Sam Waterston
- Cinematography: Sebastian Blenkov
- Edited by: Alexander Berner
- Music by: Max Richter
- Production companies: EuropaCorp; FilmNation Entertainment; Archery Pictures; France 2 Cinema; Canal+; Ciné+; France Télévisions
- Distributed by: EuropaCorp (United States and France); Entertainment One (Canada and United Kingdom)
- Release dates: November 11, 2016 (AFI Fest); November 25, 2016 (United States); March 8, 2017 (France)
- Running time: 132 minutes
- Countries: United States; France; Canada; United Kingdom
- Language: English
- Budget: $13–17 million
- Box office: $9.1 million

Miss Sloane is a 2016 American political thriller film directed by John Madden and written by Jonathan Perera. The film stars Jessica Chastain, Mark Strong, Gugu Mbatha-Raw, Michael Stuhlbarg, Alison Pill, Jake Lacy, John Lithgow, and Sam Waterston. The film follows Elizabeth Sloane, a fierce lobbyist, who fights in an attempt to pass gun control legislation.

The film had its world premiere on November 11, 2016, at the AFI Fest, and began a limited theatrical release in the United States on November 25, 2016, by EuropaCorp, before expanding wide on December 9, 2016. It was released in France on March 8, 2017. It received generally positive reviews, with Chastain's performance being particularly praised.

== Plot ==
Elizabeth Sloane is a workaholic cutthroat lobbyist who has been called before a congressional hearing led by Senator Ronald Sperling to answer questions about possible violations of Senate ethics rules during her tenure at Washington D.C. lobbying firm Cole Kravitz & Waterman.

Three months and one week earlier, Sloane's firm is approached by gun manufacturing representative Bill Sanford to lead the opposition to the proposed Heaton-Harris bill that would expand background checks on gun purchases, specifically by targeting female voters. Sloane ridicules Sanford's idea and is later approached by Rodolfo Schmidt, the head of rival lobbying firm Peterson Wyatt, to instead lead the effort in support of the bill. Sloane agrees and takes most of her staff along with her, though her closest associate Jane Molloy refuses to leave.

At Peterson Wyatt, Sloane selects Esme Manucharian to conduct the majority of the firm's media appearances, and they begin to make significant progress in garnering votes for the bill. Sloane confronts Esme with knowledge of her background as having survived a school shooting. Even though Esme does not want to disclose the information, Sloane reveals Esme's secret during a live television debate. Later, Esme is held up at gunpoint while leaving her office, but her attacker is shot dead by another civilian who is legally carrying a gun. Gun rights supporters capitalize on this event, which causes the Heaton-Harris bill to lose support in the Senate. This is compounded by the news of the Senate inquiry into Sloane's lobbying practices.

Returning to the congressional hearing, Senator Sperling produces a form requesting approval of overseas travel for a Senator. It was filed by a non-profit organization but completed in Sloane's handwriting, indicating she violated Senate ethics rules with her involvement, as a lobbyist, in arranging the travel. In answer to other questions, Sloane swears under oath that she has never practiced illegal wiretapping.

In her final statement at the hearing, Sloane admits she anticipated the opposition might attack her personally if Peterson Wyatt made too much progress with the Heaton-Harris bill. She reveals that she had someone (Molloy, her former assistant) secretly working for her, and that she did use a wiretap – which recorded Senator Sperling accepting bribes from her former boss George Dupont.

Ten months later, Sloane is visited by her lawyer in prison. The bill passed, Dupont and Sperling are under investigation, and he has petitioned for her early release. He asks if it was worth career suicide, she answers: better than suicide by career.

== Cast ==
- Jessica Chastain as Madeline "Elizabeth" Sloane
- Mark Strong as Rodolfo Schmidt
- Gugu Mbatha-Raw as Esme Manucharian
- Alison Pill as Jane Molloy
- Michael Stuhlbarg as Pat Connors
- Sam Waterston as George Dupont
- John Lithgow as U.S. Senator Ron M. Sperling
- David Wilson Barnes as Daniel Posner
- Jake Lacy as Rob Forde
- Raoul Bhaneja as R.M. Dutton
- Chuck Shamata as Bill Sanford
- Douglas Smith as Alex
- Meghann Fahy as Clara Thompson
- Grace Lynn Kung as Lauren
- Al Mukadam as Ross
- Noah Robbins as Franklin Walsh
- Lucy Owen as Cynthia Green
- Sergio Di Zio as Big Sam
- Joe Pingue as Little Sam
- Michael Cram as Frank McGill
- Dylan Baker as Jon O’Neill
- Zach Smadu as Ramirez
- Austin Strugnell as Travis
- Alexandra Castillo as Pru West
- Jack Murray as Buzzcut
- Christine Baranski as Evelyn Sumner
- Aaron Hale as Junior Spencer
- Greta Onieogou as Greta

== Production ==
The film was written by Jonathan Perera, a lawyer and first time screenwriter. Perera was inspired after watching an interview with lobbyist Jack Abramoff. In September 2015, it was announced that Jessica Chastain had been set to star in the film, with John Madden directing. Ben Browning produced, under his FilmNation Entertainment banner, and Patrick Chu executive produced, while EuropaCorp produced and financed the film, and handles worldwide distribution. In January 2016, it was announced that Alison Pill, Jake Lacy, and Gugu Mbatha-Raw had joined the cast. In February 2016, Douglas Smith, Mark Strong, Michael Stuhlbarg, Sam Waterston, John Lithgow, and Enis Esmer also joined, and in March 2016, Meghann Fahy joined the cast of the film as well. Max Richter composed the film's score.

To prepare for her role, Chastain read books by Jack Abramoff and met women lobbyists in Washington, DC to get a sense of what they do. Perera used his own mother as the basis of the Sloane character.

Principal photography began on February 12, 2016, in Toronto. Production in Toronto wrapped on March 30, 2016. In April 2016, additional shooting took place in Washington, D.C. Principal photography concluded on April 6, 2016.

== Release ==
In August 2016, two images of Chastain were released. The film had its world premiere at the AFI Fest on November 11, 2016, and also screened at the Napa Valley Film Festival on November 13, 2016. The film was originally scheduled to be released on December 9, 2016, and was later moved up to November 25.

== Reception ==
=== Box office ===
Miss Sloane grossed $3.5 million in the United States and Canada, and $5.6 million in other territories, for a worldwide total of $9.1 million.

The film began its wide release alongside the openings Office Christmas Party and The Bounce Back, and the wide expansion of Nocturnal Animals. The film was projected to gross $2–4 million in its wide opening weekend, but ended up making only $1.73 million, finishing 11th at the box office.

=== Critical response ===
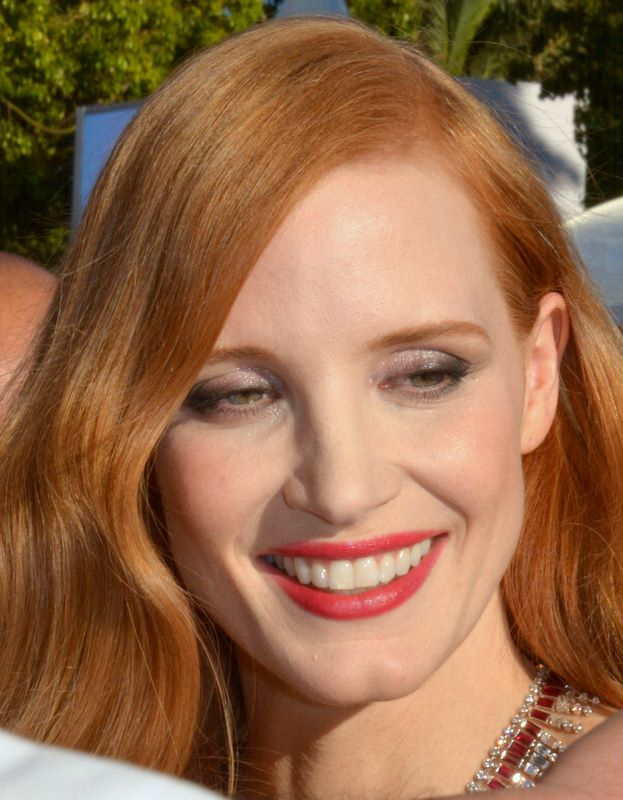
Jessica Chastain's performance was particularly praised.

On Rotten Tomatoes, the film holds an approval rating of 76% based on 191 reviews, with an average rating of 6.53/10. The website's critical consensus reads: "Miss Sloane sits squarely on the shoulders of Jessica Chastain's performance – and she responds with awards-worthy work that single-handedly elevates the film." On Metacritic, the film has a weighted average score of 64 out of 100, based on 41 critics, indicating "generally favorable reviews". Audiences polled by CinemaScore gave the film an average grade of "A−" on an A+ to F scale.

Variety's Peter Debruge wrote: "Miss Sloane is a talky, tense political thriller, full of verbal sparring and fiery monologues, undone by a really dumb ending. But that doesn’t mean it isn’t smart for most of its running time."

Todd McCarthy of The Hollywood Reporter wrote "So intriguing are the driven, smart and compromised characters, and so infinite are the dramatic possibilities at the intersection of big business and politics, that a vastly expanded small-screen take built around these characters, and others like them, would be quite welcome."

=== Accolades ===
List of awards and nominations
Award	Date of ceremony	Category	Recipient(s)	Result	Ref.
Alliance of Women Film Journalists	December 21, 2016	Bravest Performance	Jessica Chastain	Nominated	
Golden Globe Awards	January 8, 2017	Best Actress – Motion Picture Drama	Jessica Chastain	Nominated	
Washington D.C. Area Film Critics Association	December 5, 2016	Best Portrayal of Washington D.C.	Miss Sloane	Nominated	
