= Jessica Chastain =

American actress and producer (born 1977)

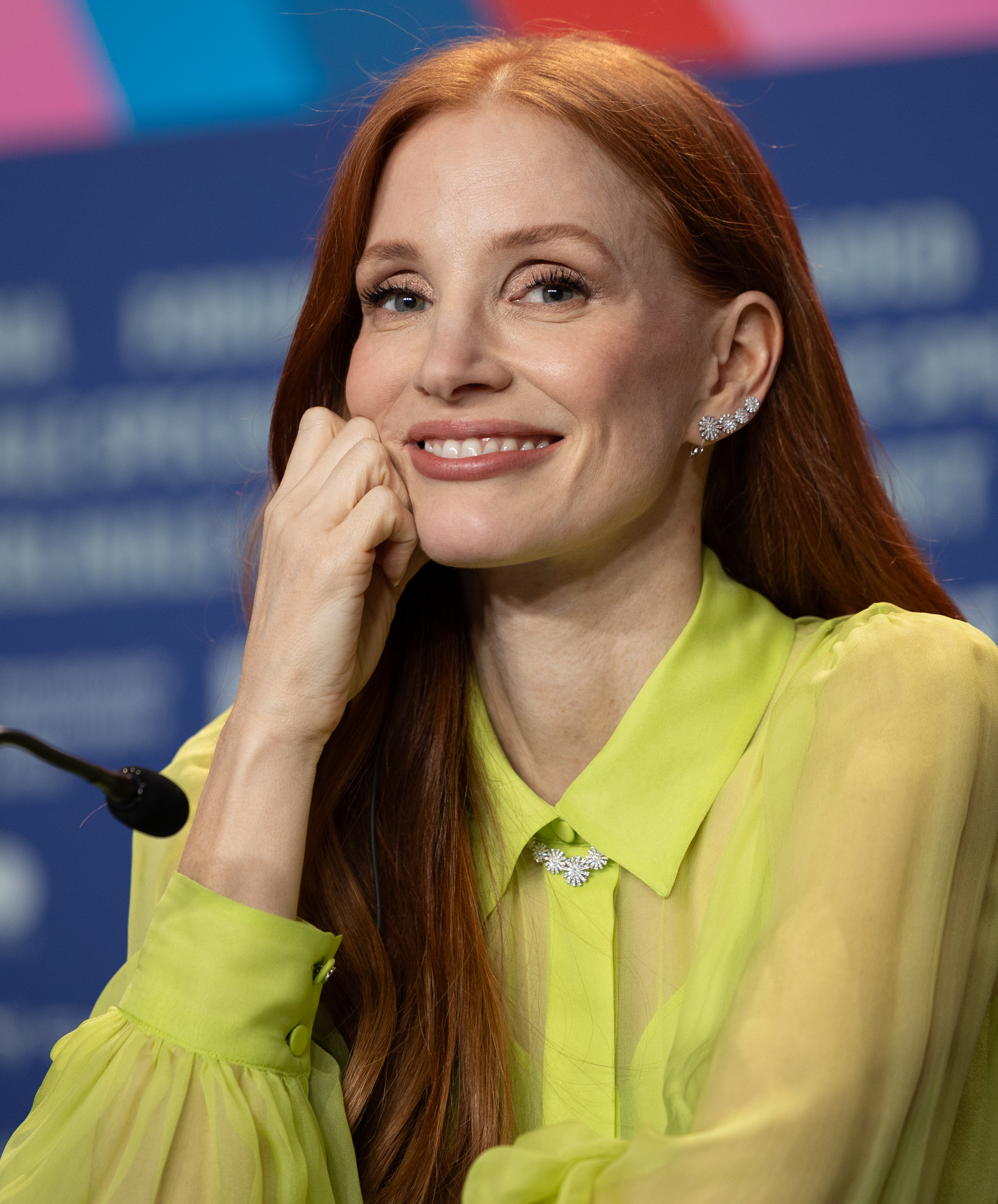
- Chastain in 2025
- Born: Jessica Michelle Chastain; March 24, 1977 (age 49); Sacramento, California, U.S.
- Education: American Academy of Dramatic Arts; Juilliard School (BFA)
- Occupations: Actress; producer
- Years active: 1998–present
- Organization: Freckle Films
- Works: Full list
- Spouse: Gian Luca Passi de Preposulo (m. 2017)
- Children: 2
- Awards: Full list

Jessica Michelle Chastain (born March 24, 1977) is an American actress and producer. Known primarily for starring in projects with feminist themes, she has received various accolades, including an Academy Award and a Golden Globe Award, in addition to nominations for a Primetime Emmy Award, two Tony Awards and two BAFTAs. Time magazine named her one of the 100 most influential people in the world in 2012.

Chastain developed an interest in acting at an early age and made her professional stage debut in 1998 as Shakespeare's Juliet. After studying acting at the Juilliard School, she worked on television and stage. After making her film debut at age 31 in the drama Jolene (2008), Chastain had her breakthrough in 2011 with six film releases, including the dramas Take Shelter (2011) and The Tree of Life (2011). She received Academy Award nominations for playing an aspiring socialite in the period drama The Help (2011) and a CIA analyst in the thriller Zero Dark Thirty (2012).

Greater commercial success came with the science fiction films Interstellar (2014) and The Martian (2015), and the horror film It Chapter Two (2019). Chastain received further acclaim for playing strong-willed women in the dramas A Most Violent Year (2014), Miss Sloane (2016), and Molly's Game (2017), and the television miniseries Scenes from a Marriage (2021). She went on to portray Tammy Faye Bakker in the biopic The Eyes of Tammy Faye (2021), winning the Academy Award for Best Actress, and Tammy Wynette in the miniseries George & Tammy (2022).

On Broadway, Chastain has starred in revivals of The Heiress (2012) and A Doll's House (2023). The latter earned her a nomination for the Tony Award for Best Actress in a Play. She is the founder of the production company Freckle Films, which was created to promote diversity in film, and is an investor in the soccer club Angel City FC. Chastain is vocal about mental health issues, as well as gender and racial equality. She is married to fashion executive Gian Luca Passi de Preposulo, a member of the ancient Passi de Preposulo family, and they have two children.

== Early life and education ==
Jessica Michelle Chastain was born on March 24, 1977, in Sacramento, California, to Jerri Renee Hastey (née Chastain) and rock musician Michael Monasterio. Her parents were both teenagers when she was born. Chastain is reluctant to publicly discuss her family background. She was estranged from Monasterio, who died in 2013, and has stated that no father is listed on her birth certificate. Chastain has two sisters and two brothers. Her younger sister, Juliet, died by suicide in 2003 following years of drug addiction. Chastain was raised in Sacramento by her mother and stepfather, Michael Hastey, a firefighter. Her family struggled financially. Chastain has said that her stepfather was the first person to make her feel secure. She shares a close bond with her maternal grandmother, Marilyn, and credits her as someone who "always believed in me".

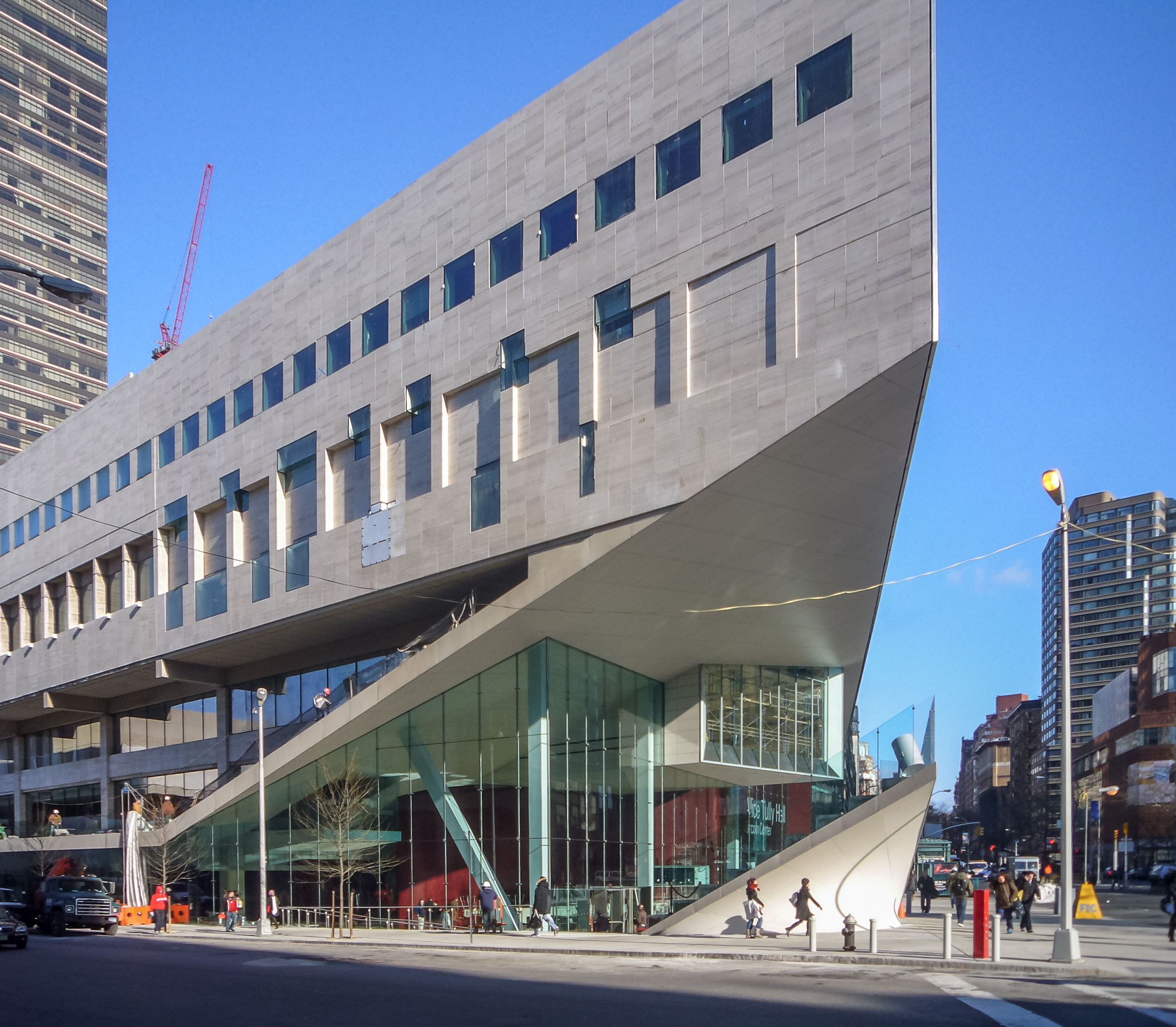
The Juilliard School in New York City, where Chastain studied acting

Chastain developed an interest in acting at age seven, after her grandmother took her to a production of Joseph and the Amazing Technicolor Dreamcoat. She regularly put on amateur shows with other children, and considered herself to be their artistic director. As a student at El Camino Fundamental High School in Sacramento, Chastain struggled academically. She was a loner and considered herself a misfit in school, but eventually found an outlet in the performing arts. She has described how she used to miss school to read Shakespeare, whose plays she became enamored with after attending the Oregon Shakespeare Festival with her classmates. With too many absences during her senior year in school, Chastain did not qualify for graduation, but later obtained an adult diploma. She later attended Sacramento City College from 1996 to 1997, during which she was a member of the institution's debate team. Describing her early childhood, she recalled:

I [grew up] with a single mother who worked very hard to put food on our table. We did not have money. There were many nights when we had to go to sleep without eating. It was a very difficult upbringing. Things weren't easy for me growing up.

In 1998, Chastain finished her education at the American Academy of Dramatic Arts and made her professional stage debut as Juliet in a production of Romeo and Juliet staged by TheatreWorks, a company in the San Francisco Bay Area. The production led her to audition for the Juilliard School in New York City, where she was soon accepted and granted a scholarship funded by actor Robin Williams. In her first year at the school, Chastain suffered from anxiety and was worried about being dropped from the program, spending most of her time reading and watching films. She later remarked that her participation in a successful production of The Seagull during her second year helped build her confidence. She graduated from the school with a Bachelor of Fine Arts degree in 2003. In 2025, Chastain announced she was enrolled in a "mid-career" Master of Public Administration program at the Harvard Kennedy School.

== Career ==
=== 2004–2010: Early work ===
Shortly before graduating from Juilliard, Chastain attended an event for final-year students in Los Angeles, where she was signed to a talent holding deal by the television producer John Wells. She relocated to Los Angeles and started auditioning for jobs. She initially found the process difficult, which she believed was due to other people finding her difficult to categorize as a redhead with an unconventional look. In her television debut, The WB network's 2004 pilot remake of the 1960s gothic soap opera Dark Shadows, she was cast as Carolyn Stoddard. The pilot was directed by P. J. Hogan, but the series was never picked up for broadcast. Later that year, she appeared as a guest performer on the medical drama series ER playing a woman she described as "psychotic", which led to her getting more unusual parts such as accident victims or characters with mental illness. She went on to appear in such roles in a few other television series from 2004 to 2007, including Veronica Mars (2004), Close to Home (2006), Blackbeard (2006), and Law & Order: Trial by Jury (2005–06).

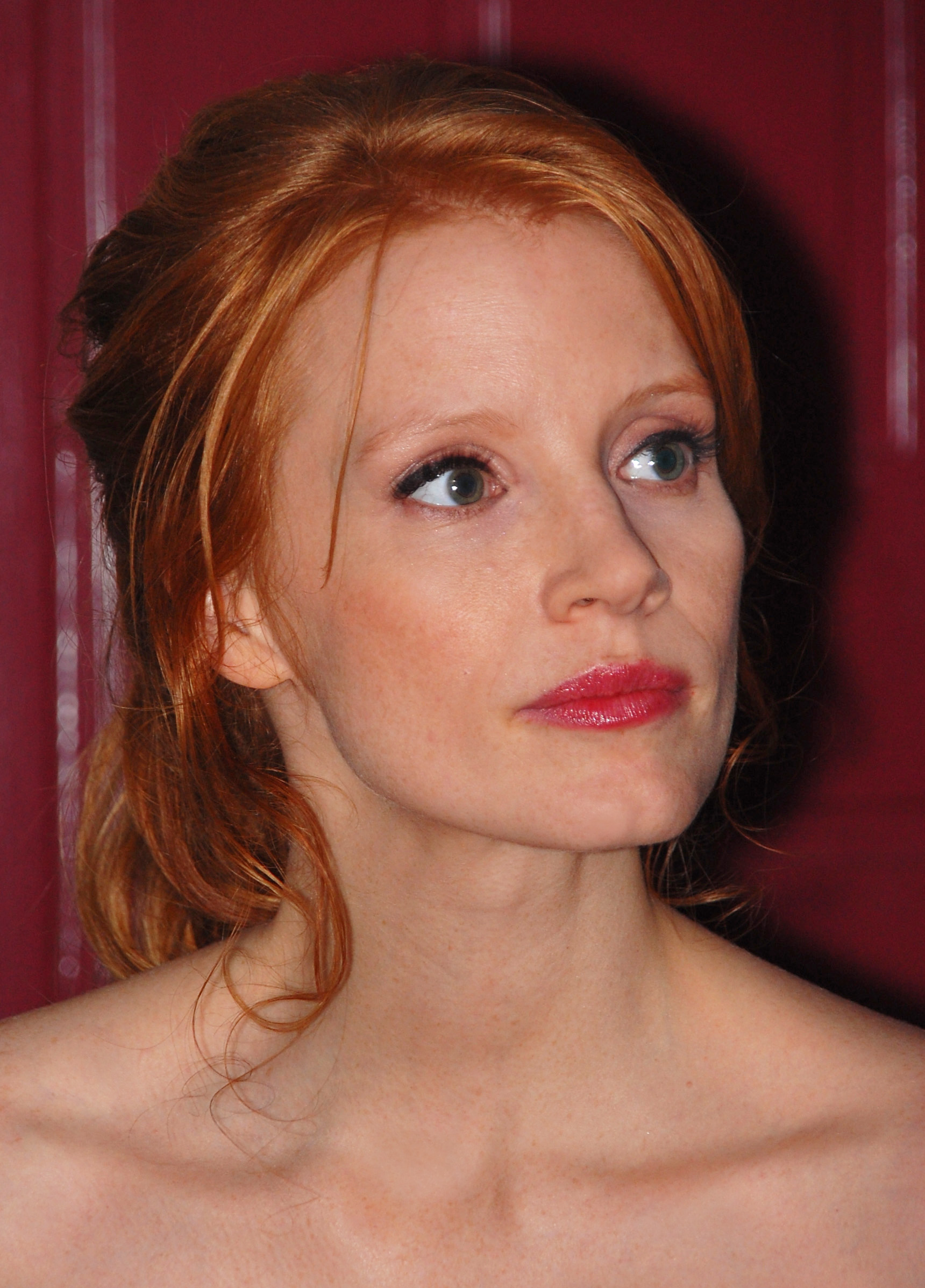
Chastain at the 2010 Mill Valley Film Festival

In 2004, Chastain took on the role of Anya, a virtuous young woman, in a Williamstown Theatre Festival production of Anton Chekhov's play The Cherry Orchard in Massachusetts, starring with Michelle Williams. Also that year, she worked with Playwrights Horizons on a production of Richard Nelson's Rodney's Wife as the daughter of a troubled middle-aged film actor. Her performance was not well received by the critic Ben Brantley of The New York Times, who thought that she "somehow seems to keep losing color as the evening progresses". While working on the play, she was recommended by Nelson to Al Pacino, who was looking for an actress to star in his production of Oscar Wilde's tragedy Salome. The play tells the tragic story of its titular character's sexual exploration. In the play, Salome is a 16-year-old, but Chastain, aged 29 then, was cast for the part. The play was staged in 2006 at the Wadsworth Theatre in Los Angeles, and Chastain later remarked that it helped bring her to the attention of several casting directors. Writing for Variety, the critic Steven Oxman criticized her portrayal in the play: "Chastain is so ill-at-ease with Salome, not quite certain whether she's a capable seductress or a whiny, wealthy brat; she doesn't flesh out either choice".

Chastain made her film debut in 2008 as the titular character in Dan Ireland's drama Jolene, based on a short story by E. L. Doctorow inspired by Dolly Parton's song "Jolene". It follows the life of a sexually abused teenager over the course of a decade. Chastain's performance was praised by a reviewer for the New York Observer, who considered her as the only notable aspect of the production. She won a Best Actress award at the Seattle International Film Festival. In 2009, she had a minor role in Stolen (2009), a mystery-thriller film with a limited theatrical release. Also in 2009, she played the part of Desdemona in The Public Theater production of Shakespeare's tragedy Othello, co-starring John Ortiz as the title character and Philip Seymour Hoffman as Iago. Writing for The New Yorker, Hilton Als commended Chastain for finding "a beautiful maternal depth" in her role.

In 2010, Chastain starred in John Madden's dramatic thriller The Debt, portraying a young Mossad agent sent to East Berlin in the 1960s to capture a former Nazi doctor who carried out medical experiments in concentration camps. She shared her role with Helen Mirren, with the two actresses portraying the character at different phases of her life. They worked together before filming to perfect the voice and mannerisms of the character and make them consistent. Chastain took classes in German and Krav Maga, and studied books about the Nazi doctor Josef Mengele and Mossad history. William Thomas of Empire termed the film a "smart, tense, well-acted thriller", and noted that Chastain "pulses with strength and vulnerability" in her part. She also appeared as Mary Debenham in an episode of the British television series Agatha Christie's Poirot, based on Agatha Christie's 1934 novel Murder on the Orient Express.

=== 2011–2013: Breakthrough and rise to prominence ===
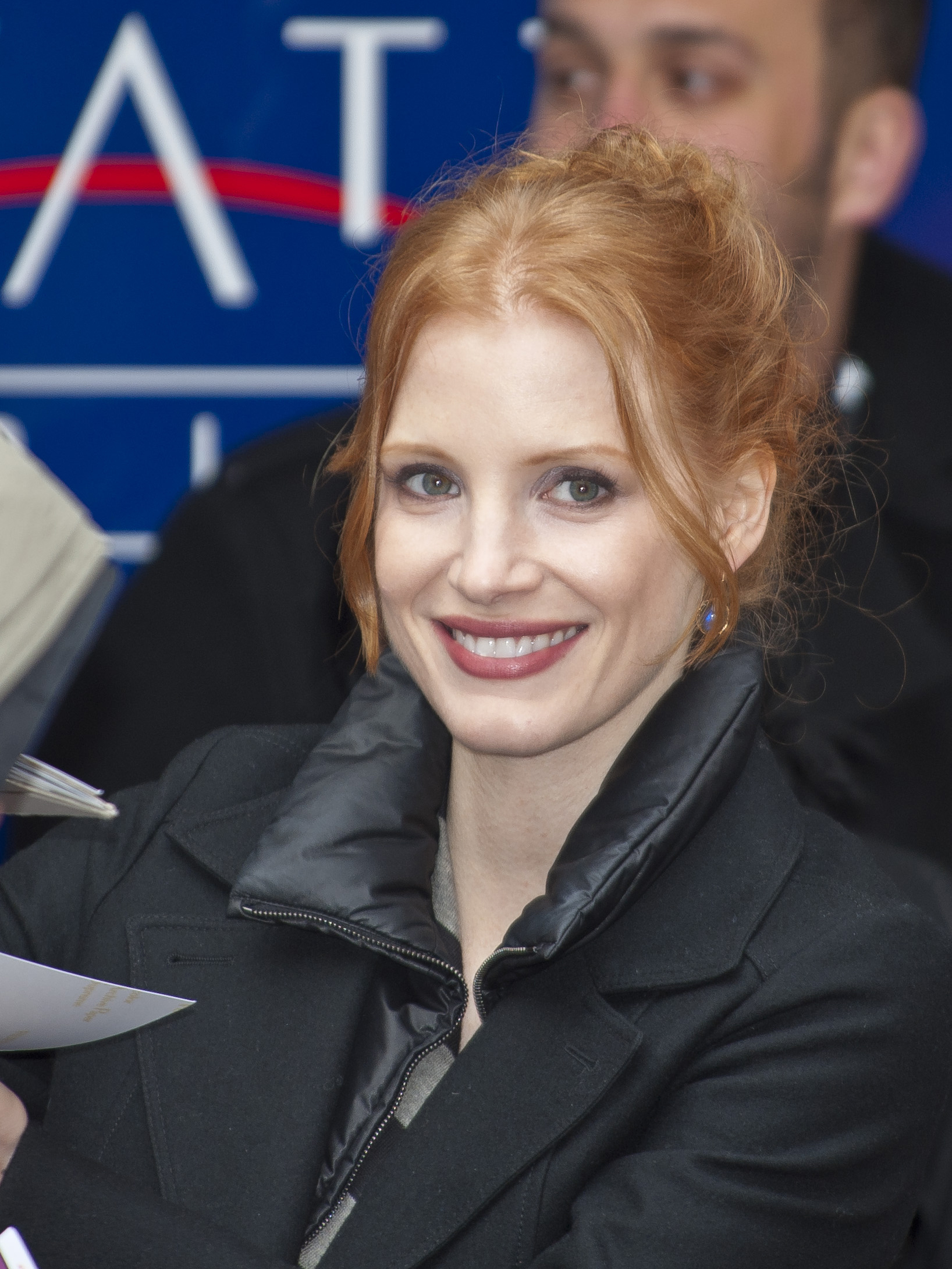
Chastain attending the premiere of Coriolanus at the 2011 Berlin International Film Festival

After struggling for a breakthrough in film, Chastain had six releases in 2011 and received wide recognition for several of them. The first of the roles was as the wife of Michael Shannon's character in Jeff Nichols' Take Shelter, a drama about a troubled father who tries to protect his family from what he believes is an impending storm. The film was screened at the 2011 Sundance Film Festival, and critic Tim Robey of The Daily Telegraph noted how much Chastain's supporting part aided the narrative. In Coriolanus, an adaptation of the Shakespearean tragedy from actor-director Ralph Fiennes, she played Virgilia. Her next role was opposite Brad Pitt, as the loving mother of three children in Terrence Malick's experimental drama The Tree of Life, which she had filmed in 2008. Chastain signed on to the film without receiving a traditional screenplay from Malick, and she improvised several scenes and dialogues with Pitt. She considered her part to be "the embodiment of grace and the spirit world"; in preparation, she practiced meditation, studied paintings of the Madonna, and read poems by Thomas Aquinas. The film premiered at the 2011 Cannes Film Festival to a polarized reception from the audience, though it was praised by critics and won the Palme d'Or. The critic Justin Chang termed the film a "hymn to the glory of creation, an exploratory, often mystifying [...] poem" and credited Chastain for playing her part with "heartrending vulnerability".

Chastain's biggest success of the year came with the drama The Help, co-starring Viola Davis, Octavia Spencer and Emma Stone, which was based on Kathryn Stockett's novel of the same name. She played Celia Foote, an aspiring socialite in 1960s Jackson, Mississippi, who develops a friendship with her Black maid (played by Spencer). Chastain was drawn to Foote's antiracist stand, and connected with her energy and enthusiasm; in preparation, she watched the films of Marilyn Monroe and researched the history of Tunica, Mississippi, where her character was raised. The Help grossed $216 million at the box office to become her most widely seen film to that point. Manohla Dargis of The New York Times praised the chemistry between Chastain and Spencer, and Roger Ebert credited her for being "unaffected and infectious". The ensemble of The Help won the Actor Award for Outstanding Cast, and Chastain received Academy, BAFTA, Golden Globe and Actor Award nominations for Best Supporting Actress, all of which she lost to Spencer.

Chastain's final two roles of the year were in Wilde Salomé, a documentary based on her 2006 production of Salome, and the critically panned crime-thriller Texas Killing Fields. Her film roles in 2011, particularly in The Help, Take Shelter and The Tree of Life, won her awards from several critics' organizations. Two of Chastain's films in 2012 premiered at the 65th Cannes Film Festival — the animated comedy Madagascar 3: Europe's Most Wanted and the crime drama Lawless. In the former, which marked the third installment in the Madagascar series, she voiced Gia the Jaguar with an Italian accent. With global revenues of $747 million, the film ranks as her highest-grossing release. In Lawless, based on Matt Bondurant's Prohibition-era novel The Wettest County in the World, she played a dancer who becomes embroiled in a conflict between three bootlegging brothers (played by Shia LaBeouf, Tom Hardy, and Jason Clarke). The film received generally positive reviews, with Richard Corliss finding Chastain to be filled with "poised, seductive gravity". In an experimental biopic of the author C. K. Williams, entitled The Color of Time (2012), directed by the New York University students of actor James Franco, she played the mother of the young Williams.

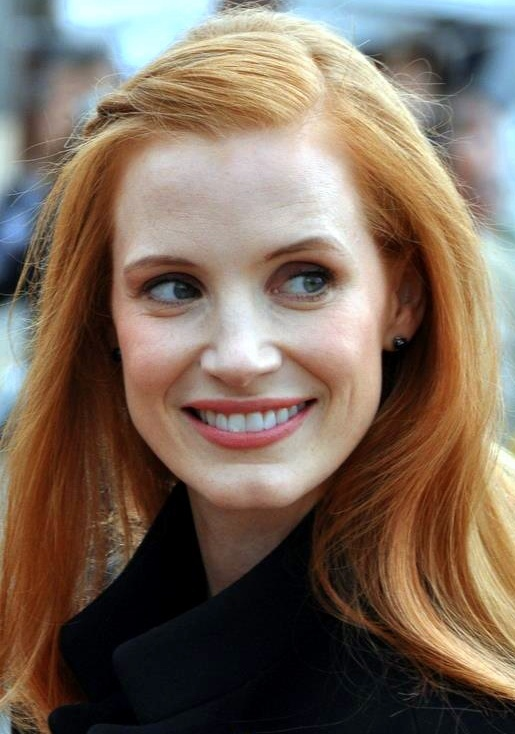
Chastain at the 2012 Cannes Film Festival where two of her films — Madagascar 3: Europe's Most Wanted and Lawless — were screened

A short part Chastain had filmed for Terrence Malick's To the Wonder (2012) was edited out of the final film, and due to scheduling conflicts, she dropped out of the action films Oblivion and Iron Man 3 (both 2013). She instead made her Broadway debut in a revival of the 1947 play The Heiress, playing the role of Catherine Sloper, a naïve young girl who transforms into a powerful woman. Chastain was reluctant to take the role, fearing the anxiety she had faced during her early stage performances. She ultimately agreed after finding a connection to Sloper, explaining: "she's painfully uncomfortable and I used to be that". The production was staged at the Walter Kerr Theatre from November 2012 to February 2013. Ben Brantley of The New York Times was disappointed in Chastain's performance, writing that she was "oversignaling the thoughts within" and that her delivery of dialogue was sometimes flat. Despite these reviews, The Heiress emerged as a sleeper hit at the box office.

Kathryn Bigelow's thriller Zero Dark Thirty was Chastain's final film release of 2012. It is a partly fictionalized account of the nearly decade-long manhunt for Al-Qaeda leader Osama bin Laden after the September 11 attacks in 2001. She played Maya Harris, a CIA intelligence analyst who helps kill bin Laden. Chastain was unable to meet the intelligence analyst on whom her character was based, so she relied on the research done by the film's screenwriter Mark Boal. The difficult subject matter made it unpleasant for her to film; she suffered from depression during production, and once walked off the set in tears because she was unable to continue. Zero Dark Thirty was critically acclaimed, albeit controversial for its scenes of torture that were shown providing useful intelligence in the search for bin Laden. Roger Ebert took note of Chastain's versatility, and likened her ability and range to that of Meryl Streep. Peter Travers of Rolling Stone wrote, "Chastain is a marvel. She plays Maya like a gathering storm in an indelible, implosive performance that cuts so deep we can feel her nerve endings." She won the Golden Globe Award for Best Actress in a Drama and received Academy, BAFTA and Actor nominations for Best Actress.

Chastain took on the lead role of a musician who is forced to care for her boyfriend's troubled nieces in the horror film Mama (2013), directed by Andy Muschietti. She was drawn to the idea of playing a woman drastically different from the "perfect mother" roles she had previously played, and she based her character's look on the singer Alice Glass. The critic Richard Roeper considered her performance to be proof of her being one of the finest actors of her generation. During the film's opening weekend in North America, Chastain became the first performer in fifteen years to have leading roles in the top two films (Mama and Zero Dark Thirty) at the box office. She then starred as the titular character of a depressed woman who separates from her husband (played by James McAvoy) following a tragic incident in the drama The Disappearance of Eleanor Rigby (2013), which she also produced. The writer-director Ned Benson initially wrote the story from the perspective of Rigby's husband, then wrote a separate version from Rigby's perspective at the insistence of Chastain. Three versions of the film — Him, Her, and Them — were released. It did not find a wide audience, but the critic A. O. Scott praised Chastain for "short-circuit[ing] conventional distinctions between tough and vulnerable, showing exquisite control even when her character is losing it, and keeping her balance even when the movie pitches and rolls toward melodrama".

=== 2014–2020: Career fluctuations and expansion ===
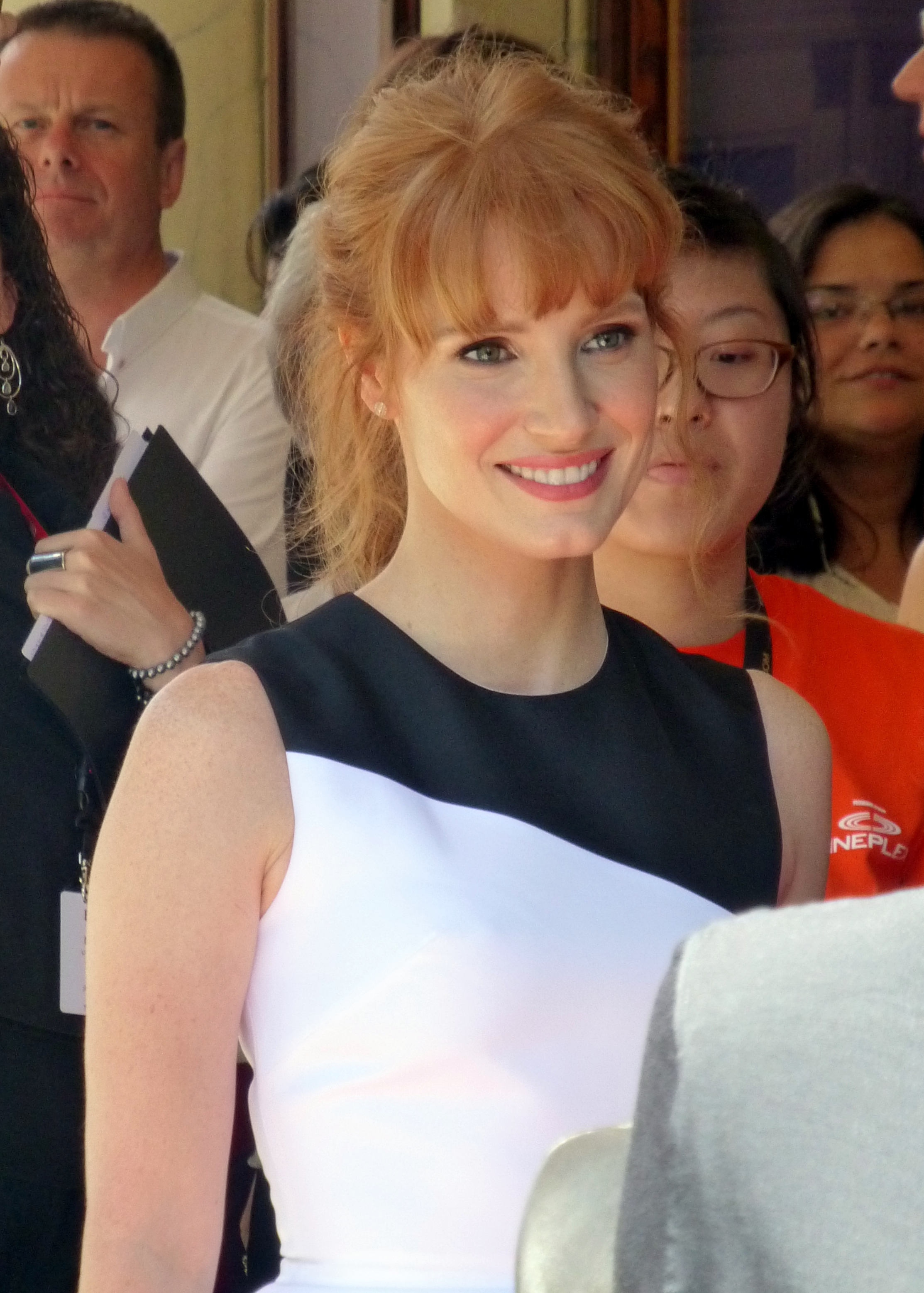
Chastain attending the premiere of Miss Julie at the 2014 Toronto International Film Festival

Chastain appeared in three films in 2014. She played the titular character in Miss Julie, a film adaptation of August Strindberg's 1888 play of the same name, from director Liv Ullmann. It tells the tragic tale of a sexually repressed Anglo-Irish aristocrat who wishes to sleep with her father's valet (Colin Farrell). She was drawn to Ullmann's feminist take on the subject. The film only received a limited theatrical release. While filming Miss Julie in Ireland, she received the script for Christopher Nolan's science fiction film Interstellar (2014). With a budget of $165 million, the high-profile production, co-starring Matthew McConaughey and Anne Hathaway, was filmed mostly using IMAX cameras. Chastain played the adult daughter of McConaughey's character; she was drawn to the project for the emotional heft she found in the father-daughter pair. Drew McWeeny of HitFix took note of how much Chastain had stood out in her supporting role. Interstellar grossed over $701 million worldwide to rank as her highest-grossing live-action film to date.

In her final release of 2014, Chastain starred in the J. C. Chandor-directed crime drama A Most Violent Year. Set in New York City in 1981, the year in which the city had the highest crime rate, the film tells the story of a heating-oil company owner (Oscar Isaac) and his ruthless wife (Chastain). In preparation, she researched the period and worked with a dialect coach to speak in a Brooklyn accent. She collaborated with the film's costume designer to work on her character's wardrobe, and contacted Armani which provided her with clothing of the period. Mark Kermode of The Observer found Chastain to be "terrific" in a part inspired by Lady Macbeth's character, and Mick LaSalle of the San Francisco Chronicle described her portrayal as "the embodiment of a nouveau riche New York woman of the era". She received a Golden Globe for Best Supporting Actress nomination for it. For her work in 2014, the Broadcast Film Critics Association honored Chastain with a special achievement award.

In 2015, Chastain took on the part of a commander in Ridley Scott's science fiction film The Martian. Starring Matt Damon as a botanist who is stranded on Mars by a team of astronauts commanded by Chastain's character, the film is based on Andy Weir's novel of the same name. Chastain met with astronauts at the Jet Propulsion Laboratory and the Johnson Space Center, and modeled her role on Tracy Caldwell Dyson, with whom she spent time in Houston. The Martian became her second film to gross over $600 million in two consecutive years. Chastain next starred as a woman who plots with her brother (Tom Hiddleston) to terrorize his new bride (Mia Wasikowska) in Guillermo del Toro's gothic romance Crimson Peak. She approached the villainous part with empathy, and in preparation read graveyard poetry and watched the films Rebecca (1940) and What Ever Happened to Baby Jane? (1962). Del Toro cast Chastain to lend accessibility to a part he considered "psychopathic", but Peter Debruge of Variety found her "alarmingly miscast" and criticized her for failing to effectively convey her character's insecurity and ruthlessness. Conversely, David Sims of Slate praised her for portraying her character's "jealous intensity to the hilt".

After playing a series of intense roles, Chastain actively looked for a light-hearted part. She found it in the ensemble fantasy film The Huntsman: Winter's War (2016), which served as both a sequel and a prequel to the 2012 film Snow White and the Huntsman. She was drawn to the idea of playing a warrior whose abilities were on par with those of the male lead, but the film flopped both critically and commercially. Chastain next starred as the titular character, a lobbyist, in the political thriller Miss Sloane, which reunited her with John Madden. She read the novel Capitol Punishment by disgraced former lobbyist Jack Abramoff to research the practice of lobbying in America, and met with female lobbyists to study their mannerisms and sense of style. Hailing her as "one of the best actresses on the planet", Peter Travers commended Chastain for successfully drawing the audience into Sloane's life, and Justin Chang termed her performance "a tour de force of rhetorical precision and tightly coiled emotional intensity". She received a Golden Globe nomination for Best Actress in a Drama. Also in 2016, Chastain launched the production company Freckle Films, headed by a team of female executives.

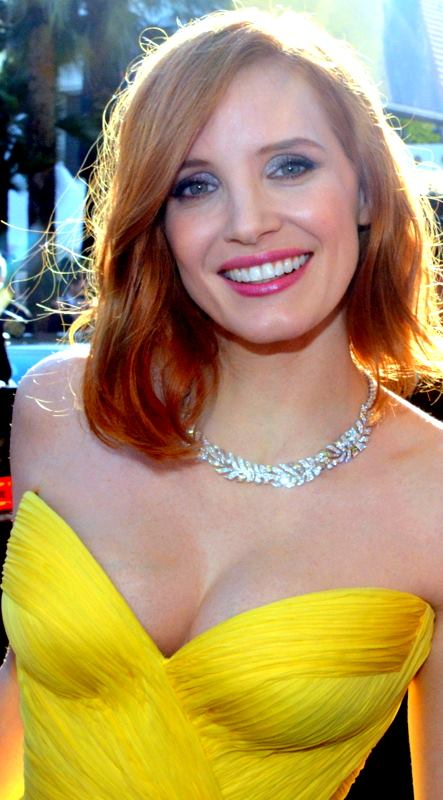
Chastain at the 2016 Cannes Film Festival

Chastain began 2017 by serving as the executive producer and providing the narration for I Am Jane Doe, a documentary on sex trafficking. In an effort to work with more female filmmakers, Chastain starred in two projects directed by women — Niki Caro's The Zookeeper's Wife and Susanna White's Woman Walks Ahead. In the former, an adaptation of Diane Ackerman's non-fiction book of the same name, she co-starred with Johan Heldenbergh as the real-life Polish zookeepers Jan and Antonina Żabiński who saved many human and animal lives during World War II. The film received mixed reviews, but Stephen Holden took note of how Chastain's "watchful, layered performance" empowered the film. Woman Walks Ahead tells the story of the 19th-century activist Catherine Weldon, who served as an adviser to the Sioux chieftain Sitting Bull prior to the Wounded Knee Massacre. She was interested in portraying a role that young girls could look up to for inspiration, and provided off-screen inputs to avoid a white savior narrative.

Chastain portrayed Molly Bloom, a former skier who ran a high-profile gambling operation that led to her arrest by the FBI, in Aaron Sorkin's directorial debut, Molly's Game (2017). She took the part due to her desire to work with Sorkin, whose writing she admired. Instead of relying on Bloom's public persona, she met Bloom personally to explore her character's flaws and vulnerabilities. She also researched the world of underground poker and interviewed some of Bloom's customers. Peter Debruge hailed her role as "one of the screen's great female parts", and credited its success to both Sorkin's script and Chastain's "stratospheric talent." She received her fifth Golden Globe nomination for it. In 2018, she hosted an episode of the television sketch comedy show Saturday Night Live and voiced the virtual reality production Spheres: Songs of Spacetime. She had filmed a part in Xavier Dolan's ensemble drama The Death & Life of John F. Donovan, but her scenes were deleted from the final cut as Dolan found her role incompatible to the story.

In the superhero film Dark Phoenix (2019), which marked the twelfth installment in the X-Men series, Chastain took on the role of an evil alien due to its focus on female characters. Peter Bradshaw of The Guardian considered it to be "a waste of her talents", and the film registered poor box office returns. She reteamed with Andy Muschietti in It Chapter Two, the sequel to his 2017 horror film It, based on Stephen King's novel. She played the adult Beverly Marsh (a woman in an abusive marriage), sharing the role with Sophia Lillis. Filming proved challenging for Chastain, as Muschietti preferred the usage of practical effects to computer-generated imagery; one particular scene required her to be covered in 4,500 US gallons (17,000 litres) of fake blood. The film received favorable reviews, with Charlotte O'Sullivan of the Evening Standard finding Chastain to be "suitably sad and sepulchral" in her role. It grossed over $470 million worldwide.

Under Freckle Films, Chastain produced and starred in the action film Ava (2020), written and initially set to be directed by Matthew Newton, who has been accused of domestic violence. Following backlash against her for agreeing to work with him, Newton was replaced with Tate Taylor. Boyd van Hoeij of The Hollywood Reporter bemoaned that Chastain's talents as an action star had been wasted in an underwhelming film. Released theatrically during the COVID-19 pandemic, it performed poorly at the box office but gained success on video on demand.

=== 2021–present: Awards success and television ===
Andrew Garfield and Chastain starred as the televangelists Jim and Tammy Faye Bakker in the biopic The Eyes of Tammy Faye (2021). She acquired the rights to Tammy Faye's life in 2012, and produced the film under her company Freckle Films. To look like Bakker, Chastain wore prosthetic makeup which took 4–7 hours to apply. The role also required her to sing, which she has said made her nervous. She worked with the music producer Dave Cobb to record seven songs for the film's soundtrack. David Fear of Rolling Stone found Chastain to be the "only reason to see this curiously tepid biopic" and praised her for rising above the script to humanize Bakker. Kevin Maher of The Times considered it to be a "riveting, unleashed and award-worthy performance" and compared it to Joaquin Phoenix's performance in Joker (2019). She won the Academy Award for Best Actress, Critics Choice Award and Actor Award, in addition to a Golden Globe nomination.

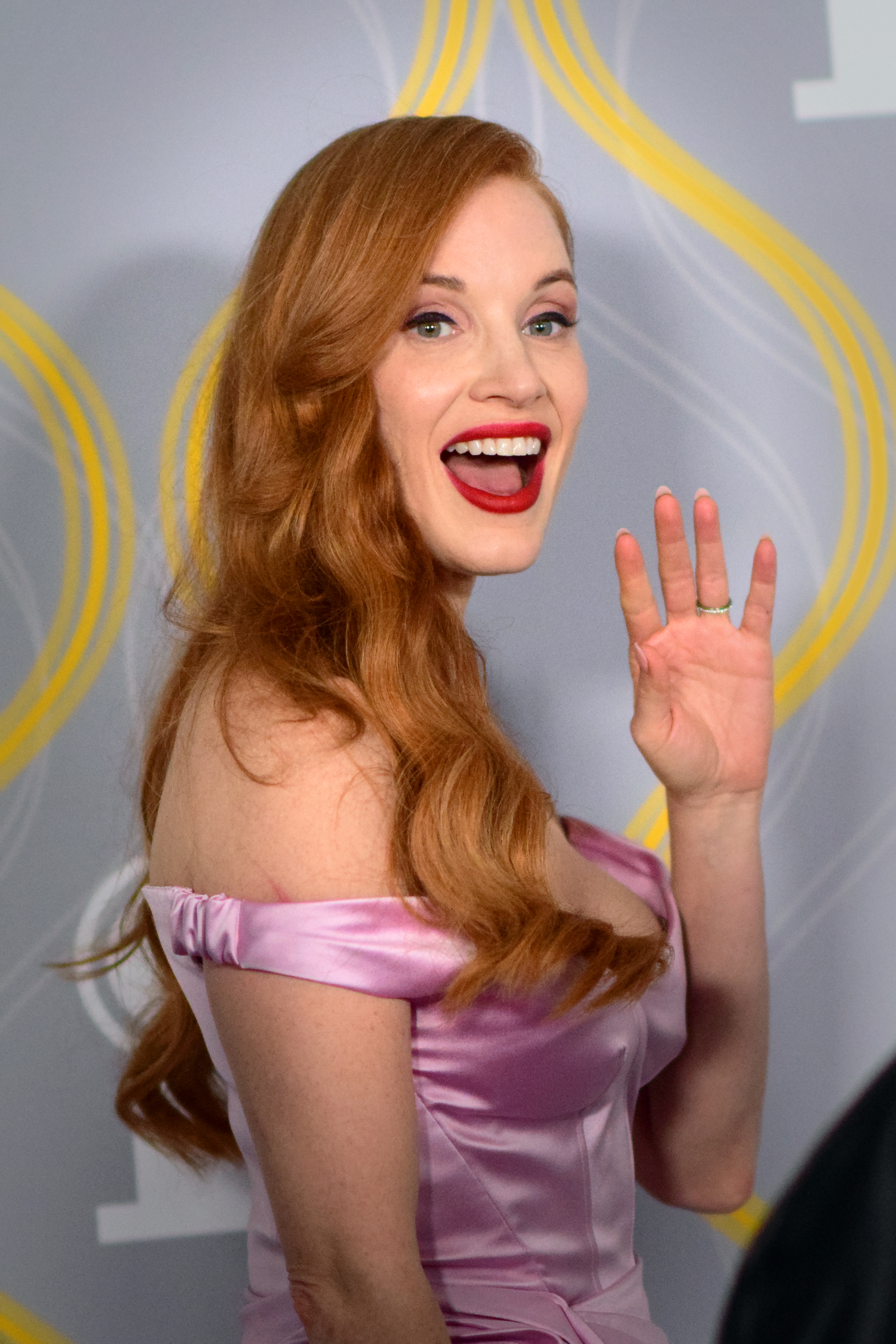
Chastain at the 75th Tony Awards in 2022

Also in 2021, Chastain agreed to Scenes from a Marriage, a gender-switched remake of Ingmar Bergman's 1973 Swedish miniseries of the same name for HBO, for its subversion of stereotypical portrayal of women. Lucy Mangan of The Guardian took note of the chemistry between Chastain and her co-star Oscar Isaac, as did Carol Midgley of The Times who praised them for "delivering crackling, wounding dialogue faultlessly". She received a nomination for the Golden Globe Award for Best Actress in a Miniseries; her second nomination at that year's ceremony. She also reteamed with Ralph Fiennes in The Forgiven, an adaptation of the novel of the same name by Lawrence Osborne.

For The 355 (2022), a female-led spy film, Chastain and her team of female co-stars pitched the idea to prospective buyers at the 2018 Cannes Film Festival, where it was picked up by Universal Pictures. Critics dismissed the film as generic and unremarkable, and it failed commercially. Chastain then took on a brief role as Maryanne Trump in James Gray's period film Armageddon Time. In The Good Nurse, she played night nurse Amy Loughren who discovers that her co-worker Charles Cullen (played by Eddie Redmayne) is a serial killer. She worked closely with Loughren and attended nursing school to prepare for the part. Kate Erbland of IndieWire found hers to be "an effective performance in a very quiet package".

Chastain executive produced the Showtime biographical miniseries George & Tammy, in which she played the country singer Tammy Wynette opposite Michael Shannon's George Jones. In preparation, Chastain and Shannon trained with a vocal coach to sing several of their character's songs. She also lost weight to play Wynette toward the end of her life. Emma Fraser of The Playlist was appreciative of the chemistry between the actors, and took note of the "fragility and toughness" in Chastain's portrayal. She won an Actor Award, received another Golden Globe nomination, and earned her first nomination for a Primetime Emmy Award for Outstanding Lead Actress in a Limited Series.

Chastain returned to Broadway theater, playing Nora Helmer, an unhappy housewife, in Jamie Lloyd's 2023 revival of Henrik Ibsen's play A Doll's House, which ran for 16 weeks at the Hudson Theatre. Initially set for West End theater in 2020, the production was canceled due to the COVID-19 pandemic, and later relocated to New York on Chastain's insistence. The production was extended one week due to the strong box office sales of the preview performances. Gloria Oladipo of The Guardian deemed Chastain's performance "enthralling" and "captivating", adding that "a fuller, infinite portrait is painted of the long-time heroine through Chastain’s work". She won the Drama Desk Award for Outstanding Lead Performance in a Play and received a nomination for the Tony Award for Best Actress in a Play. Chastain played a recovering alcoholic in Michel Franco's independent drama film Memory, co-starring Peter Sarsgaard. She was pleased to take on the low-profile project and shopped at Target herself for her character's clothes. Debruge noted that Chastain's "never appeared more vulnerable on-screen" playing a morally divisive character.

Chastain and Hathaway reunited in Mothers' Instinct (2024), a remake of the Belgian psychological thriller of the same name, which Chastain also produced. As a close friend of Hathaway, she found it challenging to play a character that's antagonistic towards Hathaway's. She reteamed with Michel Franco in Dreams, a drama about a rich American woman's relationship with an undocumented Mexican immigrant, which premiered at the 2025 Berlinale. Chastain said that she had to distance herself from her personal politics to play the part. IndieWire's Ryan Lattanzio was appreciative of her playing an against-type, largely unsympathetic role.

Chastain will next executive produce and star in the Apple TV+ miniseries The Savant, based on the true story of an investigator who infiltrates online hate groups. She will also reunite with Pacino in Lear Rex, an adaptation of Shakespeare's King Lear, playing Goneril. She also starred in the supernatural horror film Other Mommy directed by Rob Savage, based on the 2024 novel Incidents Around the House by Josh Malerman.

== Advocacy ==
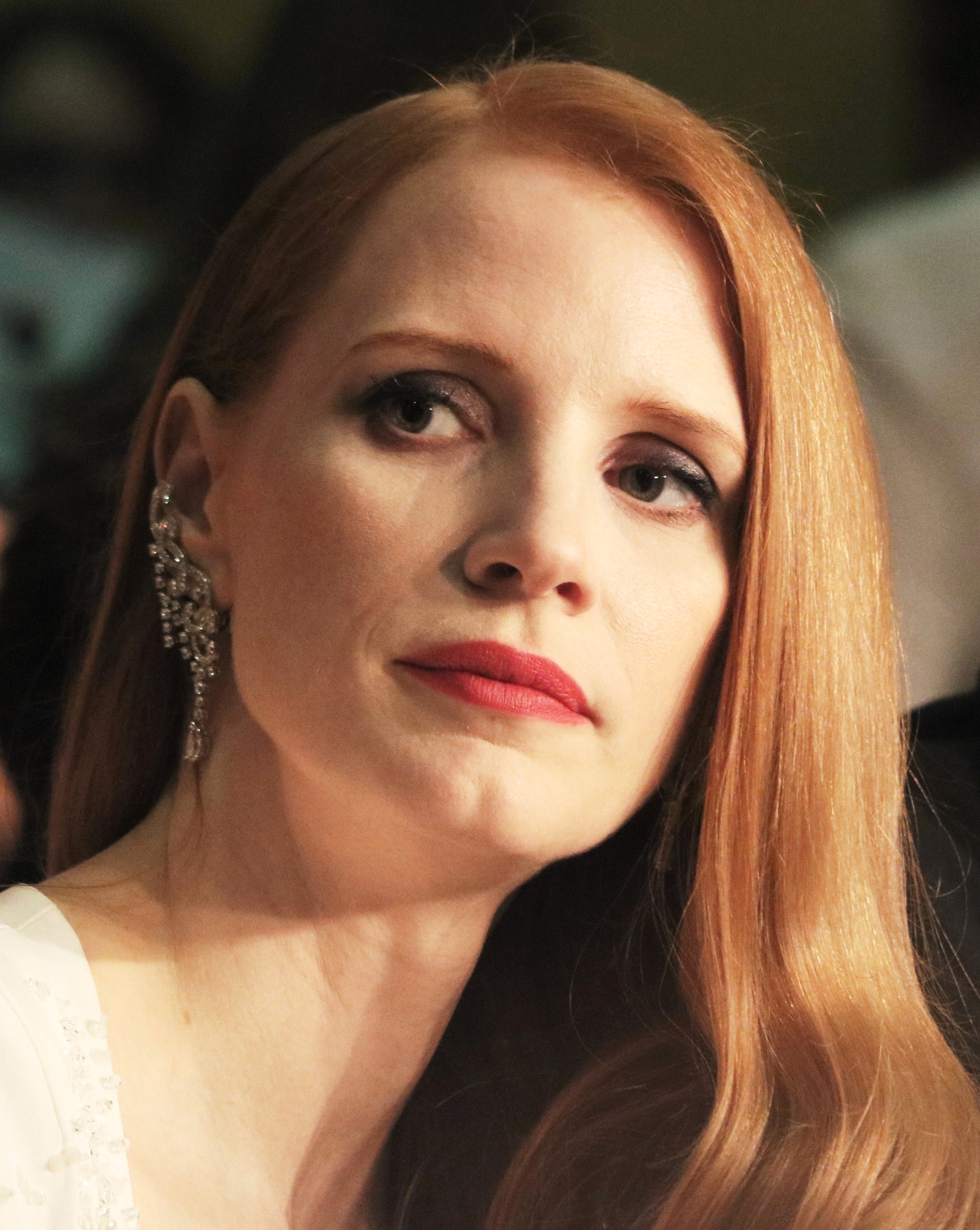
Chastain at the 2017 Cannes Film Festival, where she served as a jury member

Chastain identifies as a feminist, and has often spoken out against the discrimination faced by women and minorities in Hollywood. She penned an essay on gender imbalance in the industry for a December 2015 issue of The Hollywood Reporter. At the 2017 Cannes Film Festival, where she served as a jury member, Chastain bemoaned the passive portrayal of women in most films. She has complained about a lack of female film critics, which she believes hinders a gender-neutral perspective on film. She advocates for greater gender balance on sets, including more representation of women on film crews and in positions of power. On social media, Chastain aims to "amplify the voices" of victims of sexual harassment in the industry. In 2018, she collaborated with 300 women in Hollywood to set up the Time's Up initiative to protect women from harassment and discrimination. In the same year, she appeared alongside several actresses in This Changes Everything, a documentary about the poor representation of women in Hollywood films. She is also a LGBT rights activist. Most notably, when she had won the Academy Award for Best Actress in 2022, she voiced her support for the community she loved, and called out bigoted legislation against them.

Chastain is a vocal advocate for equal pay in the workplace, and turns down offers of work whose salaries she finds unfair. She spoke out in support of actress Michelle Williams, who was paid less than her co-star Mark Wahlberg for the 2017 film All the Money in the World, a gesture which Williams said led to greater awareness of the issue and a donation worth $2 million to the Time's Up Legal Defense Fund. In 2013, Chastain lent her support to the Got Your 6 campaign, to help empower veterans of the United States Army, and in 2016, she became an advisory-board member to the organization We Do It Together, which produces films and television shows to promote women empowerment. In 2017, she featured alongside several Hollywood celebrities in a theatrical production of The Children's Monologues, in which she performed a monolog as a thirteen-year-old girl who is raped by her uncle. The event raised funds for Dramatic Need, a charity that helps African children pursue a career in the arts. In 2020, Chastain became an investor in a Los Angeles-based franchise for the National Women's Soccer League. The new team has since been named Angel City FC.

Chastain supports charitable organizations that promote mental health, and is involved with the nonprofit organization To Write Love on Her Arms. Teased as a child for having red hair and freckles, she takes a stand against body-shaming and bullying. Chastain has campaigned for access to affordable reproductive health care for women, and in 2017, Variety honored her for her work with Planned Parenthood. In response to abortion bans in certain American states, she joined several actors in refusing to work in those regions.

In 2022, Chastain traveled to Kyiv in Ukraine during Russia's invasion of the country. She visited a children's hospital and met with President Volodymyr Zelenskyy and head of the Presidential Administration Andrii Yermak. Chastain has lent her support to the 2023 SAG-AFTRA strike. After receiving an interim-agreement waiver from the organization, she attended the premiere of her film Memory at the 2023 Venice International Film Festival wearing a t-shirt affirming her support.

== Reception and acting style ==
Describing Chastain's off-screen persona, Roy Porter of InStyle magazine wrote in 2015 that "she's an adult, which isn't always a given in Hollywood. Unconsciously candid with her answers, she retains a sense of perspective uncommon among her peers, and has real opinions"; Porter also credited her for being the rare actress who is "all about the craft". Evgenia Peretz, an editor at Vanity Fair, finds Chastain "the most sensitive and empathetic actor" she has interviewed.

Chastain specializes in portraying emotionally grueling roles and is drawn to parts of strong but flawed women. The journalist Sanjiv Bhattacharya has identified a theme of characters who "subvert gender expectations in some way". Film critic David Ehrlich credits her as the sole American actress to consistently play roles that "champion feminist ideals". She believes in extensive preparations for a role: "[I] fill myself up with as much history of the character as I can." The critics Roger Ebert and Richard Roeper have praised Chastain's versatility, and journalist Lynn Hirschberg credits her for avoiding typecasting.

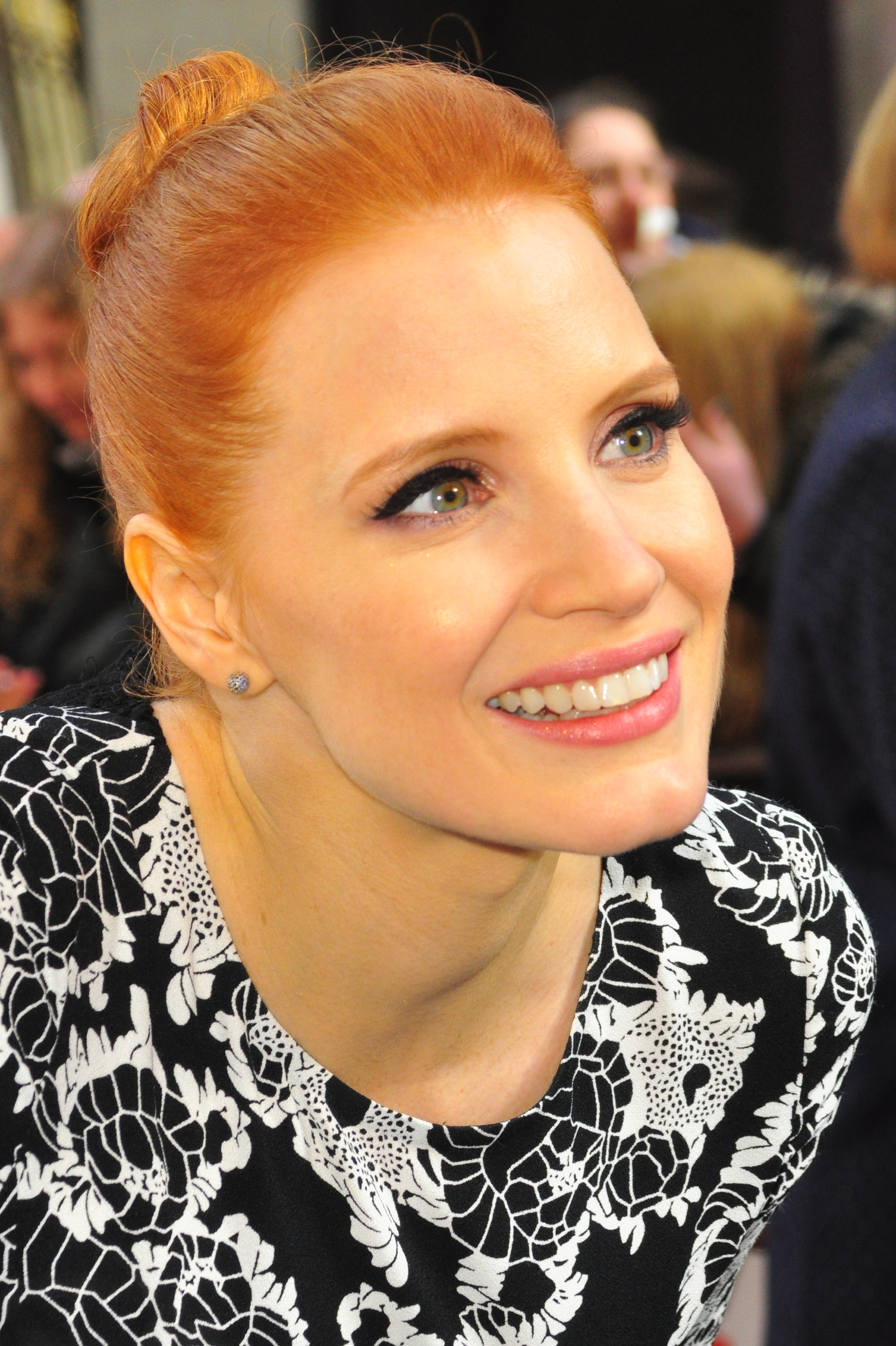
Chastain at the 2015 Empire Awards

Guillermo del Toro, who directed Chastain in Crimson Peak, believes that she is "interested in being chameleonic", and that she brings authenticity even to bizarre situations. Sophie Heawood of The Guardian believes that Chastain's ability to bring very little ego to her roles renders her unrecognizable to audiences. Sarah Karmali of Harper's Bazaar opines that "she goes for total immersion, sinking so deep into character that her face seems to change shape with each one". Lea Goldman of Marie Claire has compared her craft to that of Meryl Streep and Cate Blanchett, and writes that she values her craft over her looks. Michel Franco, who directed her in Memory, called Chastain "the best actress in the world". Describing her film career in 2017, Ben Dickinson of Elle wrote:

With her often haunted-looking eyes, pale complexion, and gorgeous red mane [...] she can project everything from icy hauteur (The Martian, Miss Sloane) to loving warmth (The Tree of Life, The Zookeeper's Wife) or an unstable equilibrium and high intelligence in between (Zero Dark Thirty and A Most Violent Year).

The journalist Tom Shone describes Chastain as being "excessively luscious [with] pale Botticelli features wrapped around a bone structure that has a touch of the masculine, right down to the cleft in her chin." She was named the sexiest vegetarian actress in a poll conducted by PETA in 2012. From 2012 to 2014, she was featured in AskMen's listing of the most desirable women, and in 2015, Glamour magazine ranked her as one of the best-dressed women.

Time magazine named Chastain one of the 100 most influential people in the world in 2012. That same year, she was invited to join the Academy of Motion Picture Arts and Sciences, and she endorsed an Yves Saint Laurent fragrance called Manifesto. In 2015, she became the global ambassador for the Swiss jewelry and watchmaking company Piaget, and in 2017, she was made the face of Ralph Lauren's fragrance campaign, named Woman. For the latter, she led an initiative called Lead Like A Woman, and featured in a short film named Leading with Intensity (2019) made by an all-female cast and crew. In 2024 she became the global ambassador for Damiani, an Italian luxury jewelry corporate group that designs, manufactures, distributes and sells jewelry and luxury watches.

== Personal life ==
Despite significant media attention, Chastain remains guarded about her personal life, and chooses not to attend red carpet events with a partner. She considers herself to be a "shy" person, and in 2011 expressed a preference for domestic routines like dog-walking and playing ukulele over partying. Chastain has cited the actress Isabelle Huppert as an influence, for managing a family, while also playing "out-there roles" on screen.

She is an animal lover, and has adopted a rescue dog. Raised by a vegan chef mother, Chastain was a pescatarian for much of her life before health troubles prompted her to begin practicing veganism. She is an investor in Beyond Meat, a meat substitutes company.

In the 2000s, Chastain was in a long-term relationship with writer-director Ned Benson that ended in 2010. In 2012, she began dating Gian Luca Passi de Preposulo, an executive for the fashion brand Moncler. On June 10, 2017, Chastain married Preposulo at his family's estate in Carbonera, Italy. In 2018, the couple had a daughter through surrogacy. They later had a son. They reside in New York City.

== Acting credits and awards ==
According to the review aggregator site Rotten Tomatoes and the box-office site Box Office Mojo, Chastain's most critically acclaimed and commercially successful films are Take Shelter (2011), Coriolanus (2011), The Tree of Life (2011), The Help (2011), Madagascar 3: Europe's Most Wanted (2012), Zero Dark Thirty (2012), Mama (2013), Interstellar (2014), A Most Violent Year (2014), The Martian (2015), Miss Sloane (2016), Molly's Game (2017), and It Chapter Two (2019). Among her stage roles, she has appeared in a Broadway revivals of The Heiress in 2012 and A Doll's House in 2023. Her television roles include the miniseries Scenes from a Marriage (2021) and George & Tammy (2022).

Chastain won an Academy Award in the Best Actress category for The Eyes of Tammy Faye (2021), and has been nominated two more times: Best Supporting Actress for The Help and Best Actress for Zero Dark Thirty. She won the Golden Globe Award for Best Actress in a Motion Picture – Drama for Zero Dark Thirty, and has been nominated seven more times: Best Actress in a Drama for Miss Sloane, Molly's Game, and The Eyes of Tammy Faye; Best Supporting Actress for The Help and A Most Violent Year; and Best Actress for a Miniseries or Television Film for Scenes from a Marriage and George & Tammy. Chastain was nominated for the Tony Award for Best Actress in a Play for A Doll's House. Chastain earned her first nomination for the Primetime Emmy Awards for Outstanding Lead Actress in a Limited or Anthology Series or Movie for George & Tammy.
