= Scenes from a Marriage (American miniseries) =

American drama television miniseries

- Genre: Drama
- Based on: Scenes from a Marriage by Ingmar Bergman
- Developed by: Hagai Levi
- Written by: Hagai Levi; Amy Herzog
- Directed by: Hagai Levi
- Starring: Oscar Isaac; Jessica Chastain
- Music by: Evgueni and Sacha Galperine
- Country of origin: United States
- Original language: English
- No. of episodes: 5

Production
- Executive producers: Hagai Levi; Michael Ellenberg; Oscar Isaac; Jessica Chastain; Lars Blomgren; Amy Herzog; M. Blair Breard; Daniel Bergman
- Producer: Carver Karaszewski
- Cinematography: Andrij Parekh
- Editor: Yael Hersonski
- Running time: 56–63 minutes
- Production companies: Sheleg; Media Res; Fifth Season; Filmlance

Original release
- Network: HBO
- Release: September 12 – October 10, 2021

Scenes from a Marriage is an American drama television miniseries developed, written and directed by Hagai Levi produced for HBO, and starring Oscar Isaac and Jessica Chastain. It is an English-language remake of the 1973 Swedish miniseries of the same name by Ingmar Bergman. It was presented at the 2021 Venice Film Festival and it premiered on September 12, 2021, on HBO. For his performance, Isaac was nominated for a Primetime Emmy Award, a SAG Award and a Golden Globe Award for Best Actor – Miniseries or Television Film, with Chastain also earning a Golden Globe nomination for Best Actress in a Limited Series, Anthology Series or Television Film.

== Premise ==
An adaptation of the 1970s Swedish miniseries focusing on a contemporary American couple.

== Cast ==
=== Starring ===
- Oscar Isaac as Jonathan Levy
- Jessica Chastain as Mira Phillips

=== Co-starring ===
- Nicole Beharie as Kate
- Corey Stoll as Peter
- Sunita Mani as Danielle
- Shirley Rumierk as Dr. Varona
- Sophia Kopera as Ava Levy, Mira and Jonathan's daughter
- Anna Rust as Veronica
- Michael Aloni as Poli

== Episodes ==
No.	Title	Directed by	Teleplay by	Original release date	U.S. viewers (millions)
1	"Innocence and Panic"	Hagai Levi	Hagai Levi and Amy Herzog	September 12, 2021	0.224
2	"Poli"	Hagai Levi	Hagai Levi	September 19, 2021	0.133
3	"The Vale of Tears"	Hagai Levi	Hagai Levi	September 26, 2021	0.165
4	"The Illiterates"	Hagai Levi	Hagai Levi	October 3, 2021	0.146
5	"In the Middle of the Night, in a Dark House, Somewhere in the World"	Hagai Levi	Hagai Levi and Amy Herzog	October 10, 2021	0.154

== Plot summary ==
The five-part miniseries follows Mira, a tech executive, and Jonathan, a philosophy professor, as the seams of their seemingly stable marriage begin to come apart. After a research interview about their relationship seems to expose hidden tensions, the couple hosts a dinner party with Kate and Peter, a couple in an open marriage. Kate expresses grief about the end of her relationship with her current lover, leading to an argument with Peter that separates the two women and two men as they all attempt to cool down. Kate and Mira discuss marriage and fidelity before Kate kisses Mira in a moment of misunderstanding. Soon after, Kate and Peter leave, and Mira admits to Jonathan that she is pregnant. After much debate about the pressures of raising another child, they decide to have the baby, though they later change their minds and abort the pregnancy.

A time jump shows Jonathan fully immersed in his duties as the primary caretaker of their daughter. He tries to write in a partially renovated attic and masturbates to pornography as soon as their daughter is in bed, though he goes for a run the next morning while listening to a podcast encouraging men to break their pornography habits. Mira is busy with a possible promotion at work, though she manages to make it home in a snowstorm, the main purpose of which is not to see her daughter but to tell Jonathan that she has fallen for another man through work and will be leaving on a work trip with him the following day. Jonathan and Mira spend long periods arguing about her decision to leave, but Mira is resolute. They fall asleep in bed, and Mira sweetly caresses Jonathan's cheek when she wakes the next day, until she remembers her reality and hurries to shower and pack for her flight. After having trouble with her suitcase, Jonathan ends up packing it for her while she watches, emotional. Mira leaves to be with her lover, Poli.

Later, Mira visits Jonathan at their house, which she no longer lives in. She is flirtatious, and the two share a pleasant conversation over drinks. She has been offered a promotion, though it would require moving overseas, a move Jonathan immediately rejects. He reads Mira a journal entry he wrote to process his own life and grief over their broken marriage. Afterward, they kiss, though Jonathan stops it from going any further, saying it wouldn't be good for him or his progress. He invites her to stay over, but his girlfriend keeps calling. He answers and admits that he is in bed with Mira. Later, in the kitchen, Jonathan claims that his and Mira's relationship was the biggest miracle of their lives and that they shouldn't have thrown it away. Mira says she's too messed up inside.

Jonathan decides to sell the house where he and Mira spent their years together. Mira comes to help deal with the movers. Jonathan wants her to sign the divorce papers they've been laboring over, but Mira avoids signing them and gets a headache. In a moment of passion, Jonathan and Mira have sex. They decide to grab food before the movers arrive, but Jonathan wants to get the papers signed. Mira says she wants to read them over, irritating Jonathan. It comes out that Mira has been fired and that her relationship with Poli is over. Mira says she wants a place to come home to, that the two of them could try again. But Jonathan says he is over her and that she should be happy for him. Mira locks him inside, attacking him when he tries to get the key, and they fight physically over Jonathan's attempt to leave the house. Finally, Mira agrees to sign the papers just as the movers arrive. Jonathan leaves.

The final episode shows Jonathan attending his father's funeral and Mira at a business lunch with Poli, though they are no longer together. Both Jonathan and Mira claim they have prior commitments that night and need to get home, though they actually meet up with each other, as they have been doing since Mira showed up to the shiva for Jonathan's father. Their old house is now a short-term rental, and Jonathan has it for the night if Mira is interested. The two go inside, chat, and share a meal. Jonathan has had a child with the woman he's seeing, though he admits that he cheats on her regularly. He and Mira attempt to have sex in their old bedroom but cannot. Mira breaks into Jonathan's old attic workroom, which is now a bedroom with an array of windows looking out into the sky. The two assess their complicated past and have passionate sex. Jonathan has a nightmare about being separated from Mira and their daughter, after which Mira holds him and quotes a line from the original Swedish 1973 miniseries by Ingmar Bergman: "In the middle of the night, without any fanfare, in a dark house, somewhere in the world."

== Production ==
It was announced in July 2020 that HBO had given the miniseries a greenlight, with Hagai Levi writing and directing, and Oscar Isaac and Michelle Williams serving as executive producers. Upon the miniseries order announcement, Isaac and Williams were also cast to star. Williams would be forced to exit her starring role in October due to a scheduling conflict, but would remain as an executive producer. She was replaced with Jessica Chastain. In November 2020, Sunita Mani was cast in a supporting role. Nicole Beharie, Corey Stoll and Tovah Feldshuh would join in supporting roles in January 2021.

Filming began in New York City in October 2020, and was halted for two weeks in November after two production staff members tested positive for COVID-19.

== Release ==
The five-episode limited series had its world premiere at the 78th Venice International Film Festival in the out of competition category. The limited series premiered on September 12, 2021, on HBO.

== Reception ==
=== Critical response ===
The review aggregator website Rotten Tomatoes reported an 81% approval rating with an average rating of 7.50/10, based on 48 critic reviews. The website's critics consensus reads, "Though Scenes from a Marriage's straightforward approach at times struggles to justify its existence, Jessica Chastain and Oscar Isaac's crackling chemistry and impressive performances are a sight to behold." Metacritic gave the series a weighted average score of 70 out of 100 based on 24 critic reviews, indicating "generally favorable reviews".

=== Ratings ===
Viewership and ratings per episode of Scenes from a Marriage
No.	Title	Air date	Rating (18–49)	Viewers (millions)	DVR (18–49)	DVR viewers (millions)	Total (18–49)	Total viewers (millions)
1	"Innocence and Panic"	September 12, 2021	0.03	0.224	TBD	TBD	TBD	TBD
2	"Poli"	September 19, 2021	0.03	0.133	TBD	TBD	TBD	TBD
3	"The Vale of Tears"	September 26, 2021	0.03	0.165	TBD	TBD	TBD	TBD
4	"The Illiterates"	October 3, 2021	0.02	0.146	TBD	TBD	TBD	TBD
5	"In the Middle of the Night, in a Dark House, Somewhere in the World"	October 10, 2021	0.02	0.154	TBD	TBD	TBD	TBD

== Accolades ==
Year	Award	Category	Nominee(s)	Result	Ref.
2022	Golden Globe Awards	Best Actor in a Miniseries or Television Film	Oscar Isaac	Nominated	
2022	Golden Globe Awards	Best Actress in a Miniseries or Television Film	Jessica Chastain	Nominated	
2022	Guild of Music Supervisors Awards	Best Music Supervision for a Trailer	Gregory Sweeney	Nominated	
2022	Hollywood Critics Association TV Awards	Best Broadcast Network or Cable Limited or Anthology Series	Scenes from a Marriage	Nominated	
2022	Hollywood Critics Association TV Awards	Best Actor in a Broadcast Network or Cable Limited or Anthology Series	Oscar Isaac	Won	
2022	Hollywood Critics Association TV Awards	Best Actress in a Broadcast Network or Cable Limited or Anthology Series	Jessica Chastain	Nominated	
2022	Hollywood Critics Association TV Awards	Best Directing in a Broadcast Network or Cable Limited or Anthology Series	Hagai Levi (for "The Illiterates")	Nominated	
2022	Hollywood Critics Association TV Awards	Best Writing in a Broadcast Network or Cable Limited or Anthology Series	Hagai Levi (for "The Illiterates")	Nominated	
2022	Primetime Emmy Awards	Outstanding Lead Actor in a Limited or Anthology Series or Movie	Oscar Isaac	Nominated	
2022	Screen Actors Guild Awards	Outstanding Performance by a Male Actor in a Miniseries or Television Movie	Oscar Isaac	Nominated	
