= Jeff Nichols =

American filmmaker (born 1978)

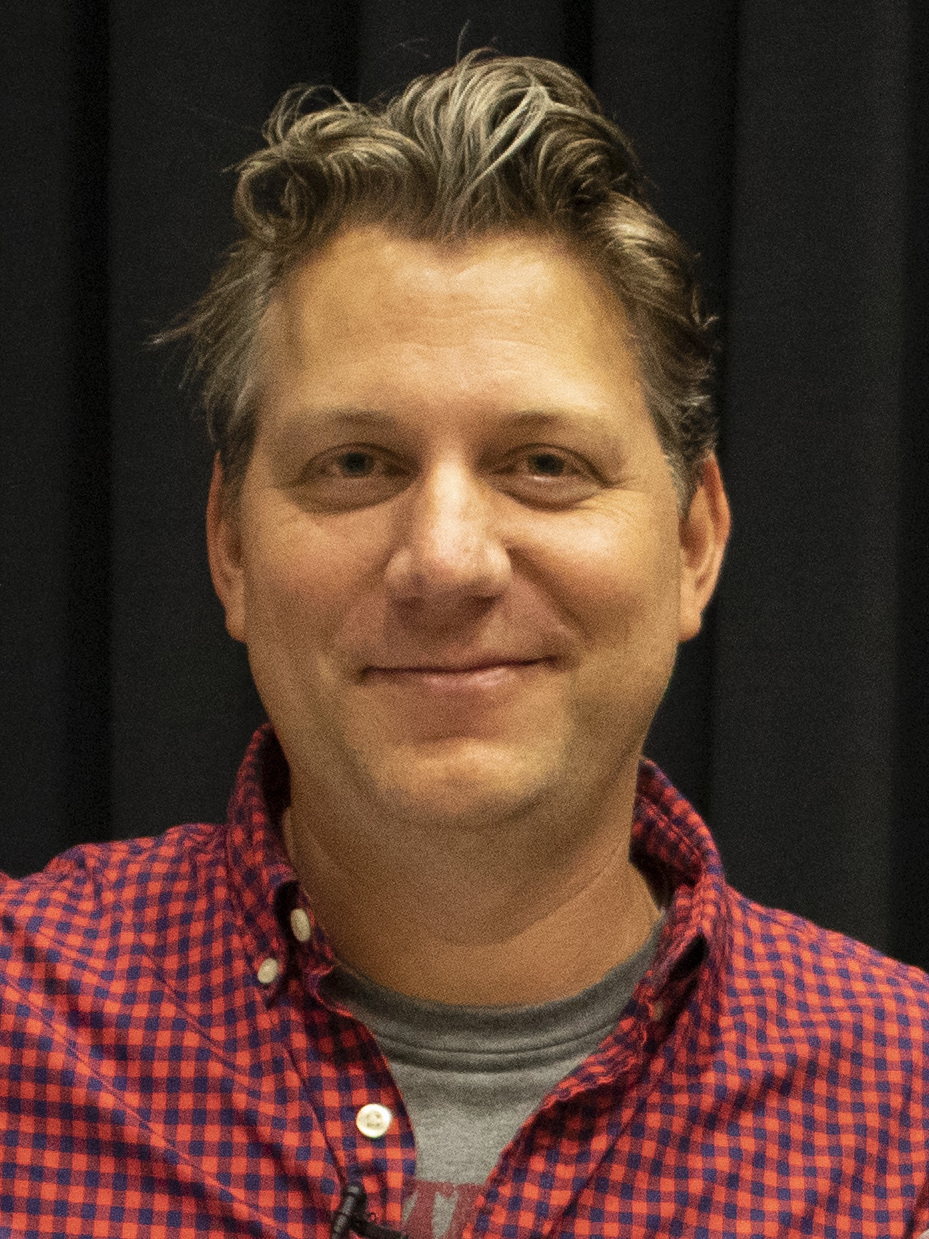
- Nichols in 2017 at the University of Texas at Austin
- Born: Jeffrey Ryan Nichols; December 7, 1978 (age 47); Little Rock, Arkansas, U.S.
- Education: Bachelor of Fine Arts in Directing
- Alma mater: University of North Carolina School of the Arts
- Occupations: Director; screenwriter; producer
- Years active: 2001–present
- Known for: Southern U.S.-based filmmaking style; collaboration with actor Michael Shannon
- Notable work: Shotgun Stories; Take Shelter; Mud; Midnight Special; Loving; The Bikeriders
- Style: Southern Gothic; Americana
- Relatives: Ben Nichols (brother)

Jeffrey Ryan Nichols (born December 7, 1978) is an American filmmaker, director, screenwriter, and producer. His films are characterized by their Southern United States backdrop and Americana ambience, slice-of-life depictions of rural and working class characters and the study of their struggles, American masculinity, and the cultural clash between traditionalism and modernism. He is also known for his longstanding collaboration with actor Michael Shannon, who has appeared in all of his feature films to date.

After studying filmmaking at the University of North Carolina School of the Arts, Nichols moved into the independent filmmaking scene with Shotgun Stories (2007). He went on to direct the critically acclaimed films Take Shelter (2011), Mud (2012), Midnight Special (2016), Loving (2016), and The Bikeriders (2023).

== Early life and education ==
Nichols was born in Little Rock, Arkansas and attended Little Rock Central High School. He is the brother of Lucero guitarist and singer Ben Nichols. Interested in film, but having no prior skills in filmmaking, Nichols studied filmmaking at the University of North Carolina School of the Arts (UNCSA) in Winston-Salem, North Carolina, where he met and befriended fellow Arkansas native David Gordon Green, who later collaborated with Nichols on works together. He had also interacted with directors Jody Hill and Craig Zobel, actor Danny McBride, and cinematographers Tim Orr and Adam Stone, the latter of which has served as director of photography on several of Nichols' films, as students during his time at UNCSA.

== Career ==
After graduating from UNCSA in 2001, Nichols had written his first screenplay, Shotgun Stories, with actor Michael Shannon in mind to play the lead, and contacted the actor through former UNCSA film professor and independent filmmaker Gary Hawkins, who knew Shannon through the Sundance Institute. The film was shot on a budget of $250,000, and released in 2007.

Nichols moved into independent productions with 2011's Take Shelter, also starring Shannon, and 2012's Mud, starring Matthew McConaughey, which competed for the Palme d'Or at the 2012 Cannes Film Festival. In 2012, Nichols acted as president of the jury of the 7th Rome Film Festival.

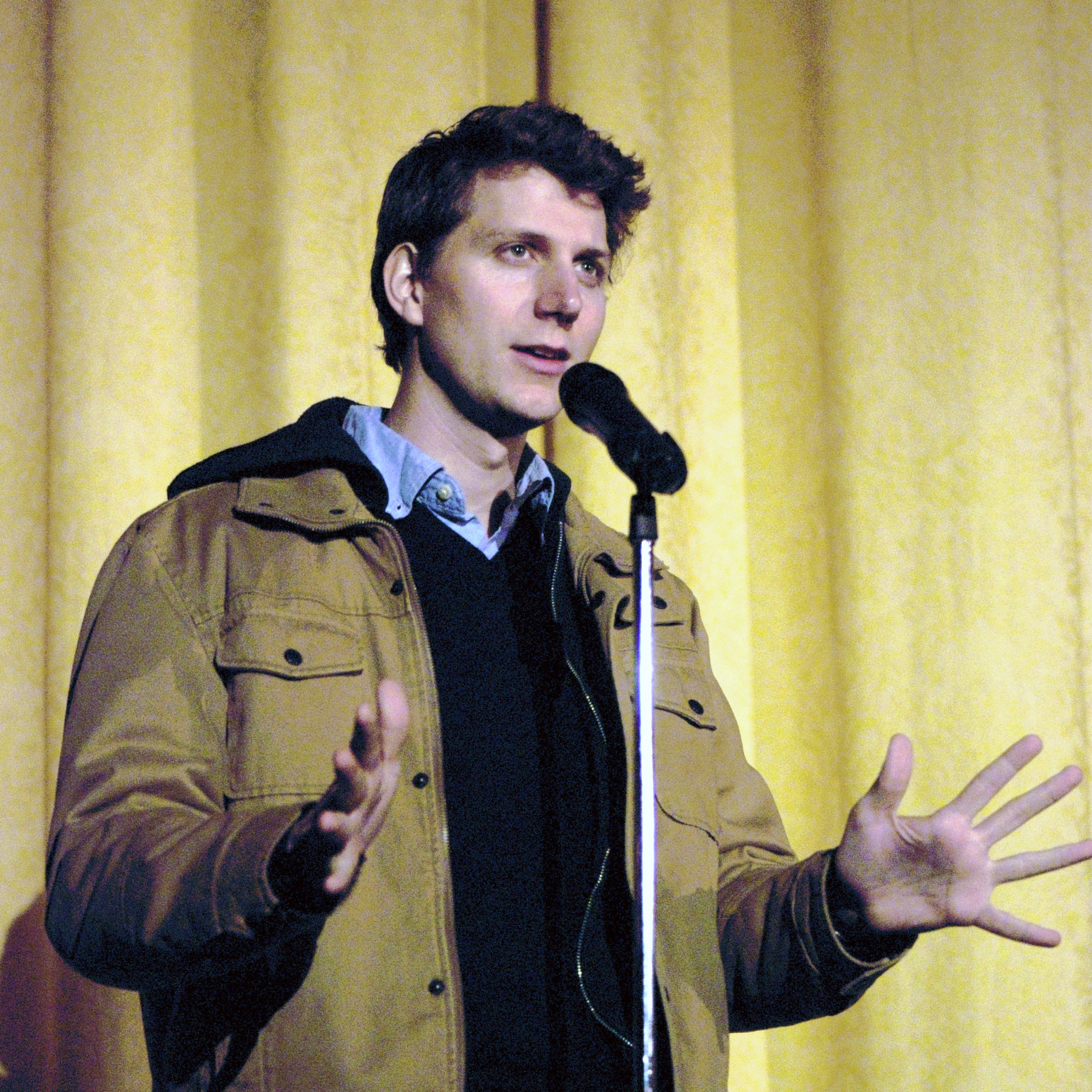
Nichols at the 2008 San Francisco IndieFest

His 2016 sci-fi drama film Midnight Special competed for the Golden Bear at the 66th Berlin International Film Festival. The same year, he directed the drama Loving, a film about the landmark U.S. civil rights court case Loving v. Virginia, which was nominated for numerous awards, including a Golden Globe nomination for lead actor Joel Edgerton and Academy Award and Golden Globe nominations for lead actress Ruth Negga.

In 2016, Nichols was hired to direct a remake of Alien Nation, but the project never came to fruition. "That’s one of the reasons it’s taken me so long to make another film," Nichols said in a 2023 interview. "I spent like four years on that. And we were at the 1-yard line. I had a cast, we were ready to go, but the universe didn’t want me to make that right then." Later, it was revealed that the script Nichols wrote for Alien Nation would be retooled into an original film and produced by Paramount Pictures.

In 2018, he directed the short film Long Way Back Home, which was inspired by a song of the same name that was written by his brother Ben and released by the country punk band, Lucero. It stars Michael Shannon, who searches the streets and backroads of Memphis for his two younger brothers, played by Garrett Hedlund and Scoot McNairy.

In 2020, it was reported that Nichols would be writing and directing Yankee Comandante, adapted from David Grann's article in The New Yorker about Che Guevara and William Alexander Morgan. Adam Driver was announced as starring in the film. However, the project ultimately collapsed due to the coronavirus pandemic with Nichols stating: "It’s hard to take a movie out in March of 2020. That was a rough year! I love it so much and David Grann’s article that inspired it is so good. I’m loath to ever say movies are important, but it feels like something that’s important... It’s an important film not only about our relationship with Cuba but also our relationship with the Southern Hemisphere and whether we’re able to export our ideology. I love what the film talks about and I love that it’s a true story that’s a little bit gonzo."

In November 2020, it was announced that Nichols would be directing and writing the screenplay for A Quiet Place: Day One. In May 2021, it was announced he finished the script for the film. However, he departed the project in October 2021, to focus on a new science fiction project also in development at Paramount Pictures.

In August 2022, it was announced that Nichols would be directing The Bikeriders, a film inspired by the Danny Lyon book of the same name. It is produced by Sarah Green and Brian Kavanaugh-Jones, through Tri-State, their company shared with Nichols. Fred Berger will be executive producer. The ensemble cast features Tom Hardy, Michael Shannon, Austin Butler, Jodie Comer, Boyd Holbrook, Damon Herriman, Toby Wallace, Emory Cohen, Beau Knapp, Karl Glusman, Happy Anderson, and Mike Faist.

In May 2024, it was announced that Nichols would direct adaptations of the Cormac McCarthy novels The Passenger and Stella Maris with New Regency, which also backed Nichols' most recent directorial effort The Bikeriders, producing. In 2026, Nichols said the project - which ultimately combined the two stories into one screenplay - was dead because "It’s a challenging story and it made for a challenging screenplay. Ultimately, (New Regency) were looking for a more commercial story and I think I was a little too faithful to the books."

Nichols' next film will be a Southern Gothic horror film entitled King Snake. The film will star Margaret Qualley and Drew Starkey as a couple inheriting a haunted farm, and will also feature his regular collaborator Shannon. On the project, Nichols stated: "I really go for it in this one, and I’m really excited to see how it plays. There are definitely horror elements to it, for sure, and more forward-facing horror elements than I’ve ever done... it’s written from the perspective of someone who’s been married for a long time. There are parts of it that feel like Loving in terms of the intensity of the relationship."

== Filmmaking style and technique ==
Several recurring filmmaking techniques are identifiable in Nichols's films. He has established a filmmaking history which involves repeat collaborations such as with actor Michael Shannon and cinematographer Adam Stone, who both have worked with Nichols on all of his projects from Shotgun Stories to The Bikeriders. Six of Nichols' films have featured Shannon: Shotgun Stories, Take Shelter, Mud, Midnight Special, Loving and The Bikeriders. Speaking of his frequent collaboration with Shannon, Nichols stated: "(Shannon) is not just a collaborator; he has become family to me. I owe my career to Michael Shannon. I learned how to direct from directing Michael Shannon. So, from the outside, it can feel kind of cute, but it’s not. I love that guy, and I want him in movies because he’s the greatest actor in the world. And if you’re a director and you have access to the greatest actor in the world, it makes sense that you would call him all the time." Additionally, the Tennessee-based alternative country band Lucero, whom Nichols' older brother Ben founded, has contributed songs to the several soundtracks of Nichols' work.

Nichols' filmmaking style is rooted in the arts, lifestyle, and culture of the Southern United States, often challenging stereotypical portrayals of Southerners in cinema through social realism, taking influence and inspiration from Southern literature by the likes of Mark Twain and Southern Gothic writers Cormac McCarthy and Larry Brown, films such as Sling Blade by Billy Bob Thornton, Frailty by Bill Paxton, Badlands by Terrence Malick, and Lone Star by John Sayles, and Nichols' own upbringing in Arkansas.

Nichols cites filmmakers John Ford, Terrence Malick, John Sayles, Steven Spielberg, Jim Jarmusch, John Carpenter, and David Gordon Green as his inspirations.

== Personal life ==
Nichols resides in Austin, Texas, and serves as the chairman of the Arkansas Cinema Society. In 2017, he co-founded the Filmland Film Festival in his capacity at the Arkansas Cinema Society to support the film industry in Arkansas.

== Filmography ==
=== Film ===
Year	Title	Director	Writer	Producer	Notes
2007	Shotgun Stories	Yes	Yes	Yes	
2011	Take Shelter	Yes	Yes	No	
2012	Mud	Yes	Yes	No	
2016	Midnight Special	Yes	Yes	No	
2016	Loving	Yes	Yes	No	
2023	The Bikeriders	Yes	Yes	No	
2027	King Snake	Yes	Yes	Yes	Post-production

Additional literary material only

- A Quiet Place: Day One (2024)

Producer

- Hellion (2014) - executive producer
- In the Radiant City (2016)
- Eric Larue (2023) - executive producer

=== Music video ===
Year	Artist	Title	Director	Writer	Ref(s)
2018	Lucero	"Long Way Back Home"	Yes	Yes	

=== Podcast ===
Year	Title	Director	Writer	Executive Producer
2020	Hank the Cowdog	Yes	Yes	Yes

== Recurring collaborators ==
Work Actor	2007	2011	2012	2016	2016	2023	2027	—N/a
Work Actor	Shotgun Stories	Take Shelter	Mud	Midnight Special	Loving	The Bikeriders	King Snake	Total
Michael Shannon								7
Ray McKinnon								2
Joel Edgerton								2
Sam Shepard†								2
Bill Camp								2
Michael Abbott Jr.								4
Paul Sparks								4
Stuart Greer								2
