= King Snake (film) =

- Directed by: Jeff Nichols
- Written by: Jeff Nichols
- Produced by: Jeff Nichols; Brian Kavanaugh-Jones; Sarah Green
- Starring: Margaret Qualley; Michael Shannon; Drew Starkey
- Cinematography: Adam Stone
- Production companies: Tri-State Pictures; FilmNation Entertainment
- Distributed by: Neon (United States); Universal Pictures; Focus Features (International)
- Country: United States
- Language: English

King Snake is an upcoming American independent Southern Gothic supernatural horror film written and directed by Jeff Nichols, starring Margaret Qualley, Michael Shannon, and Drew Starkey.

== Premise ==
A young couple (Qualley and Starkey) encounter problems after they inherit a farm in rural Arkansas.

== Cast ==
- Margaret Qualley
- Michael Shannon
- Drew Starkey
- Paul Sparks

== Production ==
The film is written and directed by Jeff Nichols. Nichols is also a producer alongside Brian Kavanaugh-Jones and Sarah Green for Tri-State Pictures. The cast is led by Margaret Qualley, Drew Starkey and Michael Shannon.

Principal photography began in late April 2026, in Lonoke County, Arkansas. Adam Stone served as the cinematographer.

== Release ==
In May 2026, Neon acquired U.S. distribution rights to the film.
