= Drama Desk Award for Outstanding Actor in a Play =

Former American theater award

Drama Desk Award for Outstanding Actor
- Awarded for: Outstanding Actor in a Play
- Location: New York City
- Country: United States
- Presented by: Drama Desk
- First award: 1975
- Final award: 2022
- Website: dramadesk.org (defunct)

The Drama Desk Award for Outstanding Actor in a Play was an annual award presented by Drama Desk in recognition of achievements in the theatre across collective Broadway, off-Broadway and off-off-Broadway productions in New York City. The award was one of eight new acting awards first presented in 1975, when Drama Desk retired an earlier award that had made no distinction between work in plays and musicals, nor between actors and actresses, nor between lead performers and featured performers.

After the 2022 ceremony, all eight acting categories introduced in 1975 were retired. The award for Outstanding Actor in a Play, along with Outstanding Actress in a Play, were replaced in 2023 with the gender neutral category of Outstanding Lead Performance in a Play.

== Winners and nominees ==
Key

and bold indicates the winner.

=== 1970s ===
Year	Actor	Play	Character
1975
1975	**Anthony Hopkins**	**Equus**	**Dysart**
1975	Roy Dotrice	Brief Lives	John Aubrey
1975	Peter Firth	Equus	Alan Strang
1975	Charles Grodin	Same Time, Next Year	George
1975	John Kani	Sizwe Banzi Is Dead	Styles / Buntu
1975	John Kani	The Island	John
1975	Alec McCowen	The Misanthrope	Alceste
1975	Richard Monette	Hosanna	Hosanna
1975	Tony Musante	P.S. Your Cat Is Dead	Vito
1975	Winston Ntshona	The Island	Winston
1975	Donald Sinden	London Assurance	Sir Harcourt Courtly
1976
1976	**John Wood**	**Travesties**	**Henry Carr**
1976	Peter Evans	Streamers	Richie
1976	Ben Gazzara	Who's Afraid of Virginia Woolf?	George
1976	Richard Kiley	The Heiress	Dr. Austin Sloper
1976	Frank Quinn	Lamppost Reunion	Mac
1976	Louis Zorich	They Knew What They Wanted	Tony
1977
1977	**Al Pacino**	**The Basic Training of Pavlo Hummel**	**Pavlo Hummel**
1977	Martin Balsam	Cold Storage	Joseph Parmigian
1977	Richard Chamberlain	The Night of the Iguana	Rev. Shannon
1977	Tom Courtenay	Otherwise Engaged	Simon
1977	Robert Duvall	American Buffalo	Walter Cole
1977	Fred Gwynne	A Texas Trilogy	Colonel J. C. Kinkaid
1977	John Heard	G.R. Point	Micah
1977	Jonathan Pryce	Comedians	Gethin Price
1978
1978	**Barnard Hughes**	**Da**	**Da**
1978	Hume Cronyn	The Gin Game	Weller Martin
1978	Judd Hirsch	Chapter Two	George
1978	James Earl Jones	Paul Robeson	Paul Robeson
1978	Frank Langella	Dracula	Dracula
1978	Brian Murray	Da	Charlie Now
1979
1979	**Philip Anglim**	**The Elephant Man**	**John Merrick**
1979	Tom Aldredge	On Golden Pond	Norman Thayer Jr.
1979	Richard Chamberlain	Fathers and Sons	Wild Bill Hickok
1979	Tom Conti	Whose Life is It Anyway?	Ken Harrison
1979	Donal Donnelly	Faith Healer	Frank Hardy
1979	Jack Lemmon	Tribute	Scottie Templeton

=== 1980s ===
Year	Actor	Play	Character
1980
1980	**John Rubinstein**	**Children of a Lesser God**	**James Leeds**
1980	F. Murray Abraham	Teibele and Her Demon	Alchonon
1980	Philip Bosco	Major Barbara	Andrew Undershaft
1980	Charles Brown	Home	Cephus Miles
1980	Gerald Hiken	Strider	Strider
1980	Judd Hirsch	Talley's Folly	Matt Friedman
1981
1981	**Ian McKellen**	**Amadeus**	**Antonio Salieri**
1981	Tim Curry	Amadeus	Wolfgang Amadeus Mozart
1981	John Heard	The Chekhov Sketchbook	Various Characters
1981	Derek Jacobi	The Suicide	Semyon Semyonovich Podsekalnikov
1981	Milo O'Shea	Mass Appeal	Tim Farley
1981	Remak Ramsay	The Winslow Boy	Sir Robert Morton
1982
1982	**Christopher Plummer**	**Othello**	**Iago**
1982	Bob Gunton	How I Got That Story	The Historical Event
1982	Zakes Mokae	"Master Harold"...and the Boys	Sam
1982	Paul Rogers	The Dresser	Sir
1982	Robert Stattel	King Lear	Edgar
1983
1983	**Harvey Fierstein**	**Torch Song Trilogy**	**Arnold Beckoff**
1983	Matthew Broderick	Torch Song Trilogy	David
1983	Jeff Daniels	Johnny Got His Gun	Joe Bonham
1983	John Malkovich	True West	Lee
1983	Remak Ramsay	Quartermaine's Terms	St. John Quartermaine
1983	John Rubinstein	The Caine Mutiny Court-Martial	Barney Greenwald
1983	James Russo	Extremities	Raul
1984
1984	**Dustin Hoffman**	**Death of a Salesman**	**Willy Loman**
1984	Rex Harrison	Heartbreak House	Captain Shotover
1984	Jeremy Irons	The Real Thing	Henry
1984	David McCallum	The Philanthropist	Philip
1984	Donald Moffat	Play Memory	Cam MacMillan
1984	Al Pacino	American Buffalo	Walter Cole
1985
1985	**John Lithgow**	**Requiem for a Heavyweight**	**Harlan "Mountain" McClintock**
1985	Jim Dale	A Day in the Death of Joe Egg	Bri
1985	Anthony Heald	Digby	Digby Merton
1985	Anthony Heald	The Foreigner	Charlie
1985	Jonathan Hogan	As Is	Rich
1985	Derek Jacobi	Cyrano de Bergerac	Cyrano de Bergerac
1985	Derek Jacobi	Much Ado About Nothing	Benedick
1985	Patrick McGoohan	Pack of Lies	Stewart
1985	Jonathan Pryce	Accidental Death of an Anarchist	The Fool
1986
1986	**Ed Harris**	**Precious Sons**	**Fred**
1986	Jeff Daniels	Lemon Sky	Alan
1986	Kevin Kline	Hamlet	Prince Hamlet
1986	Jack Lemmon	Long Day's Journey into Night	James Tyrone, Sr.
1986	John Mahoney	The House of Blue Leaves	Artie Shaughnessy
1986	Roshan Seth	A Map of the World	Victor Mehta
1987
1987	**James Earl Jones**	**Fences**	**Troy Maxson**
1987	Don Bloomfield	Lily Dale	Horace Robedaux
1987	Morgan Freeman	Driving Miss Daisy	Hoke Coleburn
1987	Victor Garber	You Never Can Tell	Dr. Valentine
1987	Ian McKellen	Wild Honey	Mikhail Platonov
1987	Alan Rickman	Les Liaisons Dangereuses	Le Vicomte de Valmont
1988
1988	**Ron Silver**	**Speed-the-Plow**	**Charlie Fox**
1988	Derek Jacobi	Breaking the Code	Alan Turing
1988	Delroy Lindo	Joe Turner's Come and Gone	Herald Loomis
1988	John Lithgow	M. Butterfly	Rene Gallimard
1988	John Malkovich	Burn This	Pale
1988	Joe Mantegna	Speed-the-Plow	Gould
1989
1989	**Philip Bosco**	**Lend Me a Tenor**	**Saunders**
1989	Mikhail Baryshnikov	Metamorphosis	Gregor Samsa
1989	Niall Buggy	Aristocrats	Casimir
1989	Peter Friedman	The Heidi Chronicles	Scoop
1989	John Kavanagh	Juno and the Paycock	Joxer Daly
1989	Stephen McHattie	Ghetto	Kittel
1989	Paul Provenza	Only Kidding!	Jerry Goldstein

=== 1990s ===
Year	Actor	Play	Character
1990
1990	**Nathan Lane**	**The Lisbon Traviata**	**Mendy**
1990	Alec Baldwin	Prelude to a Kiss	Peter Hoskins
1990	Charles S. Dutton	The Piano Lesson	Boy Willie
1990	Gary Sinise	The Grapes of Wrath	Tom Joad
1990	Colin Stinton	Some Americans Abroad	Joe Taylor
1991
1991	**Ron Rifkin**	**The Substance of Fire**	**Isaac Geldhart**
1991	Kevin Kline	Hamlet	Prince Hamlet
1991	Tom McGowan	La Bête	Valere
1991	Sab Shimono	The Wash	Sadao
1992
1992	**Brian Bedford**	**Two Shakespearean Actors**	**William Charles Macready**
1992	F. Murray Abraham	A Life in the Theatre	Robert
1992	Dennis Boutsikaris	Sight Unseen	Jonathan
1992	James McDaniel	Before it Hits Home	Wendall
1992	Brian Murray	A Small Family Business	Jack McCracken
1993
1993	**Ron Leibman**	**Angels in America**	**Roy Cohn, et al.**
1993	John Cameron Mitchell	The Destiny of Me	Alexander
1993	Denis O'Hare	Hauptmann	Richard Hauptmann
1993	Everett Quinton	Brother Truckers	Lyla Balskin
1993	Ron Rifkin	Three Hotels	Kenneth Hoyle
1994
1994	**Brian Bedford**	**Timon of Athens**	**Timon**
1994	Stacy Keach	The Kentucky Cycle	Various Characters
1994	Christopher Plummer	No Man's Land	Spooner
1994	Stephen Spinella	Angels in America: Perestroika	Prior Walter
1994	Sam Waterston	Abe Lincoln in Illinois	Abraham Lincoln
1995
1995	**Ralph Fiennes**	**Hamlet**	**Prince Hamlet**
1995	Tom Aldredge	Incommunicado	Ezra Pound
1995	Philip Bosco	The Heiress	Dr. Austin Sloper
1995	Philip Goodwin	Henry VI	Henry VI of England
1995	Ron Leibman	The Merchant of Venice	Shylock
1995	Roger Rees	Indiscretions	George
1996
1996	**Frank Langella**	**The Father**	**The Captain**
1996	Gerry Bamman	Nixon's Nixon	Richard M. Nixon
1996	George Grizzard	A Delicate Balance	Tobias
1996	Mark Nelson	Picasso at the Lapin Agile	Albert Einstein
1996	Rocco Sisto	Quills	The Marquis
1996	Patrick Stewart	The Tempest	Prospero
1997
1997	**David Morse**	**How I Learned to Drive**	**Uncle Peck**
1997	**Christopher Plummer**	**Barrymore**	**John Barrymore**
1997	Michael Gambon	Skylight	Tom Sergeant
1997	Frank Langella	Present Laughter	Garry
1997	Daniel Massey	Taking Sides	Wilhelm Furtwängler
1997	Donal McCann	The Steward of Christendom	Thomas Dunne
1998
1998	**Anthony LaPaglia**	**A View from the Bridge**	**Eddie Carbone**
1998	Jason Bowcutt	Never the Sinner	Nathan Leopold
1998	Richard Briers	The Chairs	Old Man
1998	Brian Cox	St. Nicholas	Performer
1998	John Slattery	Three Days of Rain	Walker
1998	Eli Wallach	Visiting Mr. Green	Mr. Green
1999
1999	**Brian Dennehy**	**Death of a Salesman**	**Willy Loman**
1999	Scott Glenn	Killer Joe	Killer Joe Cooper
1999	Finbar Lynch	Not About Nightingales	Canary Jim
1999	Corin Redgrave	Not About Nightingales	Bert "Boss" Whalen
1999	Toby Stephens	Ring Round the Moon	Hugo / Frederick
1999	Patrick Stewart	The Ride Down Mt. Morgan	Lyman Felt

=== 2000s ===
Year	Actor	Play	Character
2000
2000	**Stephen Dillane**	**The Real Thing**	**Henry**
2000	Gabriel Byrne	A Moon for the Misbegotten	James Tyrone, Jr.
2000	Kevin Chamberlin	Dirty Blonde	Charlie
2000	Philip Seymour Hoffman	True West	Austin (Alternated with Lee)
2000	Derek Jacobi	Uncle Vanya	Ivan Petrovich Voinitsky
2000	Paul Sparks	Coyote on a Fence	Robert Alvin "Bobby" Reyburn
2001
2001	**Richard Easton**	**The Invention of Love**	**A.E. Housman**
2001	Alan Bates	The Unexpected Man	The Man
2001	Ralph Fiennes	Richard II	Richard II of England
2001	Brian Stokes Mitchell	King Hedley II	King
2001	John Ortiz	Jesus Hopped the 'A' Train	Angel Cruz
2001	Liev Schreiber	Betrayal	Jerry
2002
2002	**Alan Bates**	**Fortune's Fool**	**Vassily Semyonitch Kuzovkin**
2002	Liam Neeson	The Crucible	John Proctor
2002	Bill Pullman	The Goat, or Who Is Sylvia?	Martin Gray
2002	Alan Rickman	Private Lives	Elyot Chase
2002	Dallas Roberts	Nocturne	The Son
2002	Jeffrey Wright	Topdog/Underdog	Lincoln
2003
2003	**Eddie Izzard**	**A Day in the Death of Joe Egg**	**Bri**
2003	Simon Russell Beale	Uncle Vanya	Ivan Petrovich Voinitsky
2003	Norbert Leo Butz	Buicks	Bill
2003	Jim Dale	Comedians	Eddie Waters
2003	Brian Dennehy	Long Day's Journey into Night	James Tyrone, Sr.
2003	Daniel Sunjata	Take Me Out	Darren Lemming
2004
2004	**Kevin Kline**	**Henry IV**	**Sir John Falstaff**
2004	John Michael Higgins	Big Bill	Bill Tilden
2004	Frank Langella	Match	Tobi
2004	Brían F. O'Byrne	Frozen	Ralph
2004	Christopher Plummer	King Lear	King Lear
2004	Paul Sparks	Blackbird	Baylis
2005
2005	**Brían F. O'Byrne**	**Doubt**	**Father Flynn**
2005	Adam Arkin	Brooklyn Boy	Eric Weiss
2005	John Cullum	Sin (A Cardinal Deposed)	Cardinal Bernard Law
2005	Bill Irwin	Who's Afraid of Virginia Woolf?	George
2005	Jeremy Piven	Fat Pig	Tom
2005	John Turturro	Souls of Naples	Pasquale
2006
2006	**Richard Griffiths**	**The History Boys**	**Hector**
2006	Vince Gatton	Candy & Dorothy	Candy
2006	John Glover	The Paris Letter	Anton Kilgallen
2006	Željko Ivanek	The Caine Mutiny Court-Martial	Lt. Com. Phillip Francis Queeg
2006	Nathan Lane	Dedication or The Stuff of Dreams	Lou Nuncle
2006	Brían F. O'Byrne	Shining City	Ian
2007
2007	**Frank Langella**	**Frost/Nixon**	**Richard Nixon**
2007	Brían F. O'Byrne	The Coast of Utopia: Voyage	Alexander Herzen
2007	Christopher Plummer	Inherit the Wind	Henry Drummond
2007	Philip Seymour Hoffman	Jack Goes Boating	Jack
2007	Liev Schreiber	Talk Radio	Barry Champlain
2007	Kevin Spacey	A Moon for the Misbegotten	James Tyrone, Jr.
2007	Paul Sparks	Essential Self-Defense	Yul Carroll
2008
2008	**Mark Rylance**	**Boeing-Boeing**	**Robert**
2008	Bill Champion	Intimate Exchanges	Toby
2008	Kevin Kline	Cyrano de Bergerac	Cyrano de Bergerac
2008	Bill Pullman	Peter & Jerry	Peter
2008	Tobias Segal	From Up Here	Kenny Barrett
2008	Rufus Sewell	Rock 'n' Roll	Jan
2009
2009	**Geoffrey Rush**	**Exit the King**	**King Berenger**
2009	Simon Russell Beale	The Winter's Tale	Leontes
2009	Reed Birney	Blasted	Ian
2009	Raúl Esparza	Speed-the-Plow	Charlie Fox
2009	Bill Irwin	Waiting for Godot	Lucky
2009	Daniel Radcliffe	Equus	Alan Strang
2009	Thomas Sadoski	reasons to be pretty	Greg

=== 2010s ===
Year	Actor	Play	Character
2010
2010	**Liev Schreiber**	**A View from the Bridge**	**Eddie Carbone**
2010	Bill Heck	The Orphans' Home Cycle	Various Characters
2010	Jude Law	Hamlet	Hamlet
2010	Alfred Molina	Red	Mark Rothko
2010	Eddie Redmayne	Red	Ken
2010	John Douglas Thompson	The Emperor Jones	Jones
2010	Christopher Walken	A Behanding in Spokane	Carmichael
2011
2011	**Bobby Cannavale**	**The Motherfucker With the Hat**	**Jackie**
2011	Charles Busch	The Divine Sister	Mother Superior
2011	Al Pacino	The Merchant of Venice	Shylock
2011	Geoffrey Rush	The Diary of a Madman	Poprishchin
2011	Mark Rylance	Jerusalem	Johnny "Rooster" Byron
2011	Michael Shannon	Mistakes Were Made	Felix Artifex
2011	Paul Sparks	Dusk Rings a Bell	Ray
2012
2012	**James Corden**	**One Man, Two Guvnors**	**Francis Henshall**
2012	Hugh Dancy	Venus in Fur	Thomas
2012	Claybourne Elder	One Arm	Ollie
2012	Santino Fontana	Sons of the Prophet	Joseph
2012	Joseph Franchini	The Navigator	Dave
2012	Philip Seymour Hoffman	Death of a Salesman	Willy Loman
2012	Kevin Spacey	Richard III	Richard III of England
2013			
2013	**Tracy Letts**	**Who's Afraid of Virginia Woolf?**	**George**
2013	Reed Birney	Uncle Vanya	Ivan Petrovich Voinitsky
2013	Daniel Everidge	Falling	Performer
2013	Tom Hanks	Lucky Guy	Mike McAlary
2013	Shuler Hensley	The Whale	Charlie
2013	Nathan Lane	The Nance	Chauncey
2014
2014	**Bryan Cranston**	**All the Way**	**President Lyndon B. Johnson**
2014	Hamish Linklater	The Comedy of Errors	Antipholus
2014	Ian McKellen	No Man's Land	Spooner
2014	David Morse	The Unavoidable Disappearance of Tom Durnin	Tom Durnin
2014	Chris O'Dowd	Of Mice and Men	Lennie Small
2014	Daniel Radcliffe	The Cripple of Inishmaan	Cripple Billy
2014	Denzel Washington	A Raisin in the Sun	Walter Lee Younger
2015
2015	**Alex Sharp**	**The Curious Incident of the Dog in the Night-Time**	**Christopher Boone**
2015	Reed Birney	I’m Gonna Pray for You So Hard	David
2015	Bradley Cooper	The Elephant Man	John Merrick
2015	Stephen McKinley Henderson	Between Riverside and Crazy	Walter 'Pops' Washington
2015	Ben Miles	Wolf Hall Parts One & Two	Thomas Cromwell
2015	Bill Pullman	Sticks and Bones	David
2016
2016	**Frank Langella**	**The Father**	**André**
2016	Andrew Garman	The Christians	Pastor Paul
2016	Avi Hoffman	Death of a Salesman	Willy Loman
2016	Tim Pigott-Smith	King Charles III	Charles, Prince of Wales
2016	Mark Strong	A View from the Bridge	Eddie Carbone
2017
2017	**Kevin Kline**	**Present Laughter**	**Garry Essendine**
2017	Bobby Cannavale	The Hairy Ape	Robert "Yank" Smith
2017	Daniel Craig	Othello	Iago
2017	David Hyde Pierce	A Life	Nate Martin
2017	John Douglas Thompson	Jitney	Jim Becker
2018
2018	**Andrew Garfield**	**Angels in America**	**Prior Walter**
2018	Johnny Flynn	Hangmen	Mooney
2018	Tom Hollander	Travesties	Henry Carr
2018	James McArdle	Angels in America	Louis Ironson
2018	Paul Sparks	Edward Albee's At Home at the Zoo	Jerry
2019
2019	**Jay O. Sanders**	**Uncle Vanya**	**Vanya**
2019	Jeff Biehl	Life Sucks	Vanya
2019	Edmund Donovan	Lewiston/Clarkston	Chris
2019	Raúl Esparza	The Resistible Rise of Arturo Ui	Arturo Ui
2019	Russell Harvard	I Was Most Alive With You	Knox

=== 2020s ===
Year	Actor	Play	Character
2020
2020	**Edmund Donovan**	**Greater Clements**	**Joe**
2020	Charles Busch	The Confession of Lily Dare	Lily Dare
2020	Raúl Esparza	Seared	Harry
2020	Francis Jue	Cambodian Rock Band	Duch
2020	Triney Sandoval	72 Miles to Go...	Billy
2020	Kyle Soller	The Inheritance	Eric Glass
2021	No awards: New York theatres shuttered, March 2020 to September 2021, due to the COVID-19 pandemic in New York City		
2022
2022	**Ruben Santiago-Hudson**	**Lackawanna Blues**	**Various**
2022	Brandon J. Dirden	Skeleton Crew	Reggie
2022	Jesse Tyler Ferguson	Take Me Out	Mason Marzac
2022	Jacob Ming-Trent	Merry Wives	Falstaff
2022	John Douglas Thompson	The Merchant of Venice	Shylock

== Multiple wins ==
3 wins

- Frank Langella

2 wins

- Brian Bedford
- Kevin Kline
- Christopher Plummer

== Multiple nominations ==
6 nominations

- Frank Langella

5 nominations

- Derek Jacobi
- Christopher Plummer
- Kevin Kline
- Paul Sparks

4 nominations

- Brían F. O'Byrne

3 nominations

- Al Pacino
- Philip Bosco
- Ian McKellen
- Philip Seymour Hoffman
- Liev Schreiber
- Bill Pullman
- Nathan Lane
- Reed Birney
- Raúl Esparza
- John Douglas Thompson

2 nominations

- John Kani
- Richard Chamberlain
- John Heard
- Jonathan Pryce
- Judd Hirsch
- James Earl Jones
- Brian Murray
- Tom Aldredge
- Jack Lemmon
- John Rubinstein
- F. Murray Abraham
- Jeff Daniels
- John Malkovich
- Remak Ramsay
- John Lithgow
- Edmund Donovan
- Daniel Radcliffe
- Charles Busch
- Jim Dale
- Anthony Heald
- James Earl Jones
- Alan Rickman
- Ron Rifkin
- Brian Bedford
- Ron Leibman
- Ralph Fiennes
- Patrick Stewart
- David Morse
- Brian Dennehy
- Alan Bates
- Simon Russell Beale
- Bill Irwin
- Kevin Spacey
- Mark Rylance
- Geoffrey Rush
- Bobby Cannavale

== See also ==
- Laurence Olivier Award for Best Actor
- Tony Award for Best Actor in a Play
