= Craig Wright (playwright) =

Puerto Rican–American dramatist

- Born: April 25, 1965 (age 61); San Juan, Puerto Rico
- Occupations: Playwright, screenwriter, television producer
- Years active: 2003–present

Craig Wright (born April 25, 1965, in San Juan, Puerto Rico) is a Puerto Rican–American playwright, screenwriter and television producer. He is known for writing for shows including Six Feet Under and Lost and creating the television series Dirty Sexy Money and Greenleaf. He also was the screenwriter for the movie Mr. Peabody & Sherman, released March 7, 2014.

== Biography ==
Born in 1965 in Puerto Rico, Wright attended Minnesota State University- Moorhead in Moorhead, MN, St. John's University in Collegeville, Minnesota, and went on to earn a Masters of Divinity degree from the United Theological Seminary of the Twin Cities.

== Playwright ==
Wright is known primarily for his plays: Grace, Mistakes Were Made, The Pavilion, Recent Tragic Events, Main Street and numerous others. Wright has received awards and award nominations for his work, including the Jerome Fellowship at age 21 and apprenticeships in playwriting from the McKnight Foundation and the National Endowment for the Arts. Wright was the recipient of the 2009 Horton Foote Excellence in American Playwriting Award from Baylor University in Waco, Texas. He is a member of the ensemble of the Chicago-based A Red Orchid Theatre.

=== Pine City plays ===
Wright set four plays in Pine City, Minnesota.

Molly's Delicious, a romantic comedy, first played at the Arden Theatre Company, Philadelphia, in September 1997, directed by Aaron Posner. The play takes place in Pine City, Minnesota, in 1965.

The next play set in Pine City is Orange Flower Water, described by the Chicago Sun-Times as "a brutally honest drama about marriage and infidelity." The play premiered at Steppenwolf Theatre Company, Chicago, from October through December 2003. and ran Off-Broadway at the Edge Theater Company in April 2005. It was published in August 2004. In 2005 it was performed at the Off-Off-Broadway Theater for the New City with a cast of Arija Bareikis, Paul Sparks, Jason Butler Harner and Pamela J. Gray, directed by Carolyn Cantor, and a 2013 production in Los Angeles was critically reviewed by Backstage.

The Pavilion premiered Off-Broadway at Rattlestick Playwrights Theater in September 2005. The Pavilion was nominated for the American Theatre Critics Association Best New Play Award and a 2005–2006 Drama Desk Award for Outstanding Play and has had over 40 productions since its premiere in 2000; in the 2008 summer season it was produced at the Westport Country Playhouse. It was also produced for Boise Contemporary Theater's 2009/10 Season.

Melissa Arctic is the last play of his Pine City works, and ran at the Folger Theatre, Washington, DC, in January and February 2004, with direction by Aaron Posner.

=== Other plays ===
Recent Tragic Events premiered at the Woolly Mammoth Theatre Company, Washington, D.C., in September 2002. The play was then produced Off-Broadway by Playwrights Horizons in September 2003. The play won an ATCA Best New Play Citation Award in 2002.

Snapshot, a multi-author project from the Actors Theatre of Louisville, premiered at the 26th annual Humana Festival of New American Plays in 2002.

Grace premiered in October 2004 at Woolly Mammoth Theatre Company in Washington, D.C. The play premiered on Broadway at the Cort Theatre in September 2012 (previews), officially on October 4, 2012, and features Kate Arrington, Ed Asner, Paul Rudd and Michael Shannon with direction by Dexter Bullard.

His play The Unseen was performed at the Cherry Lane Theatre in New York in March 2009. Blind premiered in February 2010 at Rattlestick Playwrights Theatre in New York. The Gray Sisters premiered in April 2010 at Third Rail Rep in Portland, Oregon.

== Television career ==
His television writing debut was on the 2001 HBO series, Six Feet Under, joining the writing staff during the 2003 season. During that season, he wrote "Twilight," for which he was nominated for an Emmy and "Timing and Space"; he penned 3 more episodes of Six Feet Under and co-wrote one with co-executive producer, Joey Soloway. In 2004, he was appointed Executive Story Editor with Nancy Oliver. In 2005, he became a producer for the fifth and final season.

In 2005, he signed a 2-year deal with Touchstone Television. He served as a supervising producer and writer for the second season of ABCs Lost in Fall 2005. He left the series midseason after co-writing two episodes. Wright and the Lost writing staff won the Writers Guild of America (WGA) Award for Best Dramatic Series at the February 2006 ceremony for their work on the first and second seasons.

Wright became a co-executive producer and writer on ABC's Brothers & Sisters in 2006.

During the 2007 season, Wright worked as the creator, head writer, and executive producer of ABC's Dirty Sexy Money, which stars Six Feet Under alumnus Peter Krause, Donald Sutherland, Samaire Armstrong and William Baldwin. The pilot was produced by Greg Berlanti and directed by Peter Horton. The series premiered in the fall of 2007.

In 2015, Wright created drama series Greenleaf for Oprah Winfrey Network.

=== Writing credits ===
==== Six Feet Under episodes ====
- Timing and Space, (2003)
- Twilight, (2003)
- Falling into Place, (2004)
- The Black Forest, with Joey Soloway credited as Jill Soloway, (2004)
- Time Flies, (2005)
- Static (2005)

==== Lost episodes ====
- "Orientation" (2005) with Javier Grillo-Marxuach
- "What Kate Did" (2005) with Steven Maeda

==== Brothers & Sisters episodes ====
- "Affairs of State", with Jon Robin Baitz (2006)
- "Family Portrait", with Jon Robin Baitz and Emily Whitesell (2006)
- "Mistakes Were Made, Part One", with Jon Robin Baitz (2006)

== Music ==
A musician, Wright was co-leader of an alternative rock band The Tropicals', whose first album, Live at the Jungle, was released in 1996 . As a member of the band Kangaroo he has released three albums, Phantom, Skyscraper Spaceship and Songs (French).
