= The Bikeriders =

2023 film by Jeff Nichols

- Theatrical release poster
- Directed by: Jeff Nichols
- Written by: Jeff Nichols
- Based on: The Bikeriders by Danny Lyon
- Produced by: Sarah Green; Brian Kavanaugh-Jones; Arnon Milchan
- Starring: Jodie Comer; Austin Butler; Tom Hardy; Michael Shannon; Mike Faist; Norman Reedus
- Cinematography: Adam Stone
- Edited by: Julie Monroe
- Music by: David Wingo
- Production companies: Regency Enterprises; New Regency; Tri-State Pictures
- Distributed by: Focus Features (Note: 20th Century Studios was acknowledged as The Bikeriders' distributor at various festival screenings prior to November 2023, notably the Telluride Film Festival and BFI London Film Festival.) (United States); Universal Pictures (International)
- Release dates: August 31, 2023 (Telluride); June 21, 2024 (United States)
- Running time: 116 minutes
- Country: United States
- Language: English
- Budget: $30–40 million
- Box office: $36.3 million

The Bikeriders is a 2023 American crime drama film, written and directed by Jeff Nichols. Inspired by the photo book of the same name by Danny Lyon, it depicts the lives of the Vandals Motorcycle Club, a fictional version of the Outlaws Motorcycle Club. It stars Jodie Comer, Austin Butler and Tom Hardy in the leading roles.

The Bikeriders premiered at the 50th Telluride Film Festival on August 31, 2023, and was released in the United States on June 21, 2024. Originally scheduled to be released theatrically in the United States on December 1, 2023, by 20th Century Studios, the release was delayed due to the 2023 SAG-AFTRA strike. Ultimately, Focus Features acquired the film rights from producer New Regency. The film received a positive reception and grossed $36 million worldwide.

== Plot ==
In 1965, Kathy Bauer meets Benny Cross, a hotheaded member of the Chicago-based Vandals Motorcycle Club, and marries him just five weeks later. Photography student Danny Lyon travels with and interviews the Vandals. He learns from Kathy that the founder, Johnny Davis, was inspired to create the club after watching Marlon Brando in The Wild One. Johnny's leadership is challenged when he rebuffs a Vandal's suggestion that new chapters be allowed to form. They engage in a fistfight which Johnny wins. He reestablishes his authority but grants permission to expand the club anyway. New chapters begin to form across the Midwest.

In 1969, Benny is attacked by two men in a bar for wearing his colors. His foot is nearly severed by a shovel during the altercation. Johnny forces the owner to provide the names of the men and orders his men to burn down the bar. While Benny is recovering from surgery, Johnny pressures him to come to a motorcycle rally before he is fully healed, to Kathy's objection. Johnny offers Benny leadership of the club when he eventually steps down, but Benny rejects it.

In 1971, a 20-year-old delinquent known as "the Kid" asks Johnny to allow him and his motorcycle club to join the Vandals. Johnny initially dismisses them but decides to test the Kid by allowing only him to join. When he expresses his willingness to abandon his friends, Johnny rejects him. The Kid attacks Johnny with a knife, but Johnny beats him and warns him not to come back.

In 1973, Lyon interviews Kathy about the fate of the Vandals. She explains that Johnny became despondent after the death of his lieutenant Brucie in a vehicular accident, and the club grew increasingly violent after drug-addicted Vietnam War veterans joined the ranks. At a party, longtime member Cockroach is beaten by new members when he drunkenly expresses a desire to leave the club to become a motorcycle cop. Kathy is nearly gang-raped while Benny is busy; she is narrowly rescued by Johnny. Furious, Kathy demands Benny quit the Vandals. Instead, he leaves her for several days.

Cockroach, scared for his life, asks Johnny to help him. To allow Cockroach to safely leave the club, Johnny and Benny stage a break-in, where they shoot him non-fatally in the leg. Afterwards Johnny confides in Benny the club has become wild and violent and he can't control it anymore. Disturbed by the increasing violence of the club and again rejecting Johnny's offer of leadership, Benny quits and leaves Chicago for parts unknown.

The Kid, now a member of the Vandals Milwaukee chapter, challenges Johnny to a knife fight for leadership of the Vandals. In a parking lot, Johnny confronts the Kid who pulls a handgun and kills him. Kathy relays to Lyon that after the Kid took over the Vandals, they became a large criminal gang involved in drug trafficking and murder. The original members either fell in line, left to obtain legitimate jobs, or died.

Benny returns home after learning of Johnny's death and Kathy comforts him. He and Kathy relocate to Florida, where Benny works as a mechanic and has stopped riding motorcycles. Kathy tells Lyon that they are happy, and Benny doesn't miss the biker lifestyle. She looks out the window at Benny, who smiles as the sounds of motorcycles are heard.

== Cast ==
- Jodie Comer as Kathy Cross (née Bauer)
- Austin Butler as Benny Cross
- Tom Hardy as Johnny Davis
- Michael Shannon as Zipco
- Mike Faist as Danny Lyon
- Boyd Holbrook as Cal
- Damon Herriman as Brucie
- Beau Knapp as Wahoo
- Emory Cohen as Cockroach
- Karl Glusman as Corky
- Toby Wallace as The Kid
- Norman Reedus as Funny Sonny
- Happy Anderson as Big Jack
- Paul Sparks as Gary Rogue Leader
- Will Oldham as Bartender

== Production ==
The Bikeriders is named after Danny Lyon's photo book, which filmmaker Jeff Nichols discovered in 2003 at his brother's apartment in Memphis, Tennessee. The story's Vandals MC is inspired by the book's detailing of the Outlaws Motorcycle Club. Lyon is portrayed in the film by Mike Faist. Since 2004, Nichols had mentioned the project to Michael Shannon, who has starred in all his films, on the set of each collaboration; while making the short film Long Way Back Home in 2018, Shannon quipped that he had "been talking about that damn idea for so long." By 2022, Nichols wrote the screenplay from his original story idea. New Regency agreed to produce the film in May 2022. The project was officially announced with Nichols attached as director in August 2022, with Jodie Comer, Austin Butler, and Tom Hardy on board to star.

Nichols cast Comer after sitting on two awards panels that honored her performance on the one-person Broadway show Prima Facie and after hearing good things about her from Adam Driver, who co-starred with her in The Last Duel (2021). He met with Hardy for the first time at his London residence, admitting to leaving the meeting "kind of punch drunk" before seeing a performance of Comer's in Prima Facie at the Harold Pinter Theatre in the West End. The rest of the ensemble came on board soon after. Principal photography began in Cincinnati, Ohio, in October 2022 and concluded in December. Several actors, except Shannon and a few others, learned how to ride a motorcycle for the film; Butler mentioned a motorcycle accident on set: "We were doing a night shoot and hit a patch of wet leaves and I went down, but I thankfully landed on my feet." Adam Stone was the cinematographer, and during post-production, David Wingo composed the score.

== Release ==
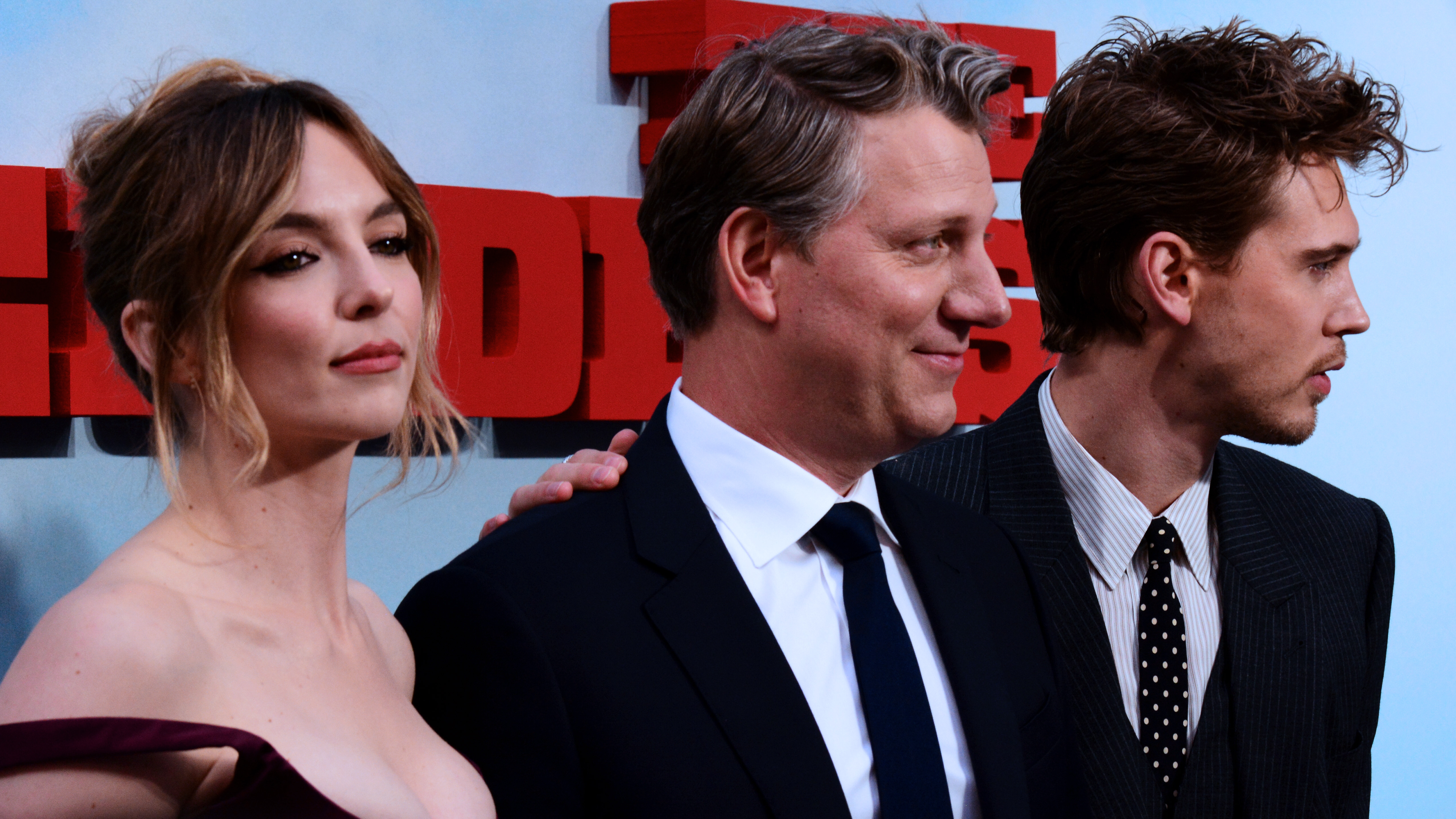
Comer, Nichols, and Butler at the London premiere of the film

The Bikeriders premiered as the opening film of the 50th Telluride Film Festival on August 31, 2023. It was originally scheduled to be theatrically released on December 1, 2023, by 20th Century Studios, to make time for awards season, but it was taken off the release schedule in July due to the SAG-AFTRA strike (July–November 2023), which prevented the cast from promoting the film. Industry sources also cited Renaissance: A Film by Beyoncé opening on the same day and New Regency's The Creator (2023) performing poorly in theaters during the strike as reasons for the delay. Following this, on November 20 that year, New Regency was reportedly shopping the film to rival studios and streamers for release instead.

Two days later, Focus Features acquired the distribution rights, with its parent Universal Pictures distributing internationally. New Regency chose Focus Features because of their previous collaboration on The Northman, which became profitable despite box office disappointment. In December 2023, Focus Features scheduled the film for a theatrical release in the United States on June 21, 2024. Regarding the film's promotion, Deadline Hollywood noted that after The Bikeriders transferred from 20th Century Studios (owned by Disney) to Focus, the original marketing campaign centered around Comer was altered to focus on Butler and Hardy; opening weekend audiences leaned male. Focus covered half of the film's $30–40 million production cost and was reportedly "on the hook" for print and advertising (P&A) expenses.

== Reception ==
=== Box office ===
The Bikeriders grossed $21.7 million in the United States and Canada, and $14.5 million in other territories, for a worldwide total of $36.3 million.

In the United States and Canada, The Bikeriders was released alongside The Exorcism and Thelma, and was projected to gross $8–10 million from 2,665 theaters in its opening weekend. It ended up debuting to $9.7 million, finishing in third behind holdovers Inside Out 2 and Bad Boys: Ride or Die. In its second and third weekends the film made $3.3 million and $1.3 million, respectively.

=== Critical response ===
On the review aggregator website Rotten Tomatoes, 80% of 274 critics' reviews are positive, with an average rating of 6.9/10. The website's consensus reads: "Fueled by a charismatic cast and the gritty authenticity of writer-director Jeff Nichols' approach, The Bikeriders offers a conventional yet impactful look at motorcycle culture." Metacritic, which uses a weighted average, assigned the film a score of 70 out of 100, based on 53 critics, indicating "generally favorable" reviews. Audiences surveyed by CinemaScore gave the film an average grade of "B" on an A+ to F scale, while those polled by PostTrak gave it a 73% positive score.
