= Sarah Green (film producer) =

American film producer

- Born: United States
- Occupation: Film producer

Sarah Green is an American film producer. She currently sits on the National Board of Directors for the Producers Guild of America. On January 24, 2012, she was nominated for an Academy Award for the film The Tree of Life.

== Career ==
Green is an independent film producer known for her ongoing work with writer/directors including Jeff Nichols, Terrence Malick, David Mamet and John Sayles. In March 2017, Green was inducted into the Austin Film Society's Texas Film Hall of Fame, alongside honorees Jeff Nichols and Tye Sheridan.

Sarah Green produced Jeff Nichols' Loving, which garnered a Best Actress Academy-Award nomination for Ruth Negga; and Midnight Special (Warner Brothers) with Michael Shannon, Joel Edgerton, Adam Driver and Kirsten Dunst. Green produced Terrence Malick's rock n' roll love story, Song to Song, featuring Michael Fassbender, Ryan Gosling, Rooney Mara and Natalie Portman, as well as Terrence Malick’s Knight of Cups, starring Christian Bale, Cate Blanchett, and Natalie Portman.

Green also produced Malick's Voyage of Time: The IMAX Experience, narrated by fellow producer Brad Pitt, and its feature-length version, Voyage of Time: Life's Journey, narrated by Cate Blanchett.

Green was a producer on Nichols' Mud as well, with Matthew McConaughey and Reese Witherspoon. Mud premiered as an official selection at Sundance and was selected for main competition at Cannes. It was the highest grossing independent release during the summer of 2013, with a Rotten Tomatoes rating of 98% fresh. She was executive producer on Nichols' Take Shelter which premiered at the Sundance Film Festival and won the Grand Prize in Critics Week, the FIPRESCI award and the SACD award for best feature, all at the Cannes Film Festival.

Green produced Malick's Best Picture Academy Award-nominated The Tree of Life starring Brad Pitt, Jessica Chastain and Sean Penn, which also won the Palme d'Or at the Cannes Film Festival. She has also produced Malick’s To the Wonder starring Ben Affleck, Olga Kurylenko, Rachel McAdams and Javier Bardem, and his Academy Award-nominated, The New World, starring Colin Farrell and Christian Bale.

Green produced the Academy Award-winning Frida, directed by Julie Taymor and starring Salma Hayek and Alfred Molina, and Dirty Dancing: Havana Nights starring Diego Luna. She also produced Girlfight and State and Main; Girlfight won the Prix de la Jeunesse at the Cannes Film Festival, shared the Grand Jury Prize and won Best Director for Karyn Kusama at the Sundance Film Festival, as well as multiple awards for then newcomer Michelle Rodriguez. State and Main won multiple cast awards for an ensemble that included Philip Seymour Hoffman, Sarah Jessica Parker, Alec Baldwin and Julia Stiles, as well as four screenplay nominations for writer/director David Mamet.

Previously, Green produced Mamet’s The Winslow Boy, The Spanish Prisoner, American Buffalo (directed by Michael Corrente) and Oleanna. She produced three films for writer/director John Sayles: The Secret of Roan Inish, nominated for three Independent Spirit Awards; Passion Fish, nominated for two Academy Awards, two Golden Globes and two Film Independent Spirit Awards (winning one); and City of Hope, which won the Grand Prix at the Tokyo Film Festival and the Critics’ Award at the Edinburgh International Film Festival. Green also produced the Emmy Award® winning American Playhouse production of Andre's Mother, which was named Best Television Movie of 1990 by the National Board of Review.

== Filmography ==
- The Bikeriders (2023)
- Eric Larue (2023)
- Fahrenheit 451 (executive producer) (2018)
- Song to Song (2017)
- Voyage of Time (2016)
- The Vessel (executive Producer) (2016)
- Loving (2016)
- Midnight Special (2016)
- Knight of Cups (2015)
- After the Fall (2014)
- Hellion (executive producer) (2014)
- To the Wonder (2012)
- Mud (2012)
- Amor crónico (2012)
- The Tree of Life (2011)
- Take Shelter (executive producer) (2011)
- The New World (2005)
- Dirty Dancing: Havana Nights (2004)
- The Republic of Love (executive producer) (2003)
- Frida (2002)
- State and Main (2000)
- Girlfight (2000)
- The Winslow Boy (1999)
- The Spanish Prisoner (co-producer) (1997)
- American Buffalo (1996)
- Oleanna (1994)
- The Secret of Roan Inish (1994)
- Passion Fish (1992)
- City of Hope (1991)
- Thousand Pieces of Gold (co-producer) (1991)
- American Playhouse (1982-1993)
