= Midnight Special (film) =

2016 film by Jeff Nichols

- Theatrical release poster
- Directed by: Jeff Nichols
- Written by: Jeff Nichols
- Produced by: Sarah Green; Brian Kavanaugh-Jones
- Starring: Michael Shannon; Joel Edgerton; Kirsten Dunst; Adam Driver; Sam Shepard
- Cinematography: Adam Stone
- Edited by: Julie Monroe
- Music by: David Wingo
- Production companies: Faliro House Productions; Tri-State Pictures; RatPac-Dune Entertainment
- Distributed by: Warner Bros. Pictures
- Release dates: February 12, 2016 (Berlinale); March 18, 2016 (United States)
- Running time: 112 minutes
- Country: United States
- Language: English
- Budget: $18 million
- Box office: $7.7 million

Midnight Special is a 2016 American Southern Gothic science fiction thriller film written and directed by Jeff Nichols, and produced by Sarah Green and Brian Kavanaugh-Jones. It stars Michael Shannon, Joel Edgerton, Kirsten Dunst, Adam Driver, Jaeden Martell (Note: Credited as Jayden Lieberher.) and Sam Shepard.

The film follows a Texas man (Shannon) that takes his 8-year-old son (Martell) on the run across the Southern United States to protect him from government authorities and religious extremists pursuing them after they discover that he possesses supernatural powers.

Midnight Special marks Nichols' first major studio production, who produced and distributed the film with Warner Bros. Pictures. It was selected to compete for the Golden Bear at the 66th Berlin International Film Festival. The film began a theatrical release on March 18, expanding wider in subsequent weeks. Despite receiving positive critical acclaim, the film grossed $7 million worldwide against its $18 million budget.

== Plot ==
In West Texas, Roy Tomlin and his childhood friend Lucas hear an Amber alert for 8-year-old Alton Meyer and his reported abductor, Roy, while the boy reads comic books in the car.

At the Ranch, a religious cult in San Angelo, Texas, Pastor Calvin Meyer dispatches two of his parishioners to retrieve Alton. He then faces his congregation as the FBI executes a warrant at their church. NSA communications analyst Paul Sevier asks Calvin how numbers sent via encoded satellite transmissions made their way into his sermons. Calvin explains that Alton speaks in tongues and gave the numbers to Calvin, interpreting them to be from God. As Alton's powers grew, his mother Sarah abandoned him, and members of the Ranch have been raising him, with Pastor Meyer adopting him, from his biological father, Roy, who later rescued his son from the Ranch.

After Lucas kills a state trooper during an accident, the trio seek cover at the Arkansas home of Elden, an ex-Ranch member. During the night, an earthquake seems to wake Roy and Lucas. When they break down the door to Alton's room, they find him linked to Elden by blinding beams of light directly from his eyes into Elden's. Roy knocks out Elden and covers up Alton, who is extremely photosensitive. They take Elden's van and continue on toward a rendezvous location in the Florida panhandle that Alton specified. Members of the Ranch seem to know this location, but the FBI is desperately trying to figure out where the trio are headed.

When they stop at a Louisiana gas station, Alton seems to destroy a satellite, creating a rain of debris crashing down on them. They drive to Sarah Tomlin's house, and she is overjoyed to be reunited with her son. After they watch the news together, Alton explains that he caused the satellite to crash because federal authorities were using it to track him.

As the fugitives (now including Sarah) continue on their trek, Alton appears to be growing sick and weak. He convinces Roy to let him see the daylight, while Lucas and Sarah go ahead to a motel. After witnessing his first ever sunrise, Alton's eyes begin to glow, and an enormous dome of light surrounds the duo. They reunite with Lucas and Sarah, and Alton is healthy. He explains that seeing the sun helped him realize his true identity. He explains that there is a world "built on top of" this one and that he belongs to it. Roy confirms that he briefly saw this hidden world inside the dome of light.

When they exit the hotel room, they are ambushed by Calvin's trackers from the ranch, who abduct Alton but are soon captured by the police. Alton is taken to a Mississippi military base where, although he had no normal way of knowing who the man was, he insists that he will talk only to Paul Sevier. After Sevier experiences Alton's powers, he helps reunite him with his parents. Having deduced their destination from Calvin's sermons, Sevier warns the fugitives that there is a 5-mile security perimeter around the location in Florida.

Roy barrels through a roadblock, driving inside the perimeter as the Army scrambles to give chase. As they speed away, Alton lets them know just where to stop. Alton and Sarah speedily exit the car and run into the woods. Roy and Lucas lead the Army on a wild goose chase while Alton and Sarah reach the edge of a swamp. There, a great dome of light appears, engulfing much of Florida and the surrounding Gulf Coast states. Everyone inside the dome of light can see the futuristic structures of a parallel world. Eventually, other beings of this world gather around Alton, and the entire dome disappears, taking Alton with it.

Roy and Lucas are arrested. Lucas is interviewed by the FBI. He tells them the story, but they are dissatisfied. Sevier then enters to interview him, with Lucas the only one aware of Sevier's previous involvement. Sarah, apparently walking away from her past life forever, cuts off her cult-traditionalist hair braid in a local gas station. Roy is incarcerated, but can watch the sunrise, his eyes briefly and faintly glowing in a similar manner to Alton's.

== Cast ==
- Michael Shannon as Roy Tomlin, an ex-Ranch member and Alton's biological father
- Joel Edgerton as Lucas, a childhood friend of Roy and a Texas Highway Patrol trooper
- Kirsten Dunst as Sarah Tomlin, an ex-Ranch member, and Alton's biological mother
- Adam Driver as Paul Sevier, a lead analyst with the NSA specialized in communications
- Jaeden Martell as Alton, Roy and Sarah's son with supernatural powers
- Sam Shepard as Pastor Calvin Meyer, leader of the Ranch
- Bill Camp as Doak, a parishioner of the Ranch
- Scott Haze as Levi, a parishioner of the Ranch
- Paul Sparks as Agent Miller, an FBI agent in charge of the search for Alton
- David Jensen as Elden, an ex-Ranch member

== Production ==
Nichols came up with the initial plot idea of two guys driving a car only at night on the back roads of the American South and added his desire to make a science fiction film in the style of ones from his childhood, such as Close Encounters of the Third Kind, E.T. the Extra-Terrestrial, and Starman. He combined these two tracks with the theme of fatherhood, drawing from his own relationship with his one-year-old son at the time of writing Midnight Special.

Principal photography commenced on January 20, 2014, and took place for 40 days in New Orleans, wrapping on March 1, 2014. The film was produced by Sarah Green and Brian Kavanaugh-Jones, with Glen Basner and Christos V. Konstantakopoulos as executive producers.

== Release ==
Midnight Special was backed and primarily distributed by Warner Bros. Pictures, and Entertainment One handled UK distribution. Warner Bros. initially set the film for a release on November 25, 2015, but in July 2015 moved the date back to March 18, 2016. The film was given a limited release on March 18, 2016, while the wide expansion began on April 8 in the United States. Warner Home Video released the film on DVD and Blu-ray in the U.S. on June 14, 2016.

== Reception ==
Rotten Tomatoes gives the film an 83% approval rating based on 240 reviews; the average score is 7.30/10. The site's consensus reads, "Midnight Special's intriguing mysteries may not resolve themselves to every viewer's liking, but the journey is ambitious, entertaining, and terrifically acted." On Metacritic, the film has a weighted average score of 76 out of 100 based on 44 critics, indicating "generally favorable reviews". Critics compared the film to the sci-fi works of Steven Spielberg and John Carpenter, most notably Close Encounters of the Third Kind and Starman. Neil Young of RogerEbert.com, praised the film's homages to other works such as the X-Men comic books, The X-Files, and E.T. the Extra-Terrestrial. Peter Debruge of Variety praised Nichols' portrayals of working-class characters in the science fiction genre.

Ignatiy Vishnevetsky of The A.V. Club described the "Spielberg-esque" science fiction chase film as "more of a genre piece than anything Nichols has done, carried by its steady momentum and its engrossing sense of mystery." He praised Midnight Special for Nichols' visual style and an "embarrassment of wonderful performances". Benjamin Lee, writing for The Guardian, felt that Nichols was "making a concerted effort to stake his claim as a hit-maker" but that the film lacks "Spielbergian magic", leaving it "disappointingly lifeless".
