= Bill Pullman =

American actor (born 1953)

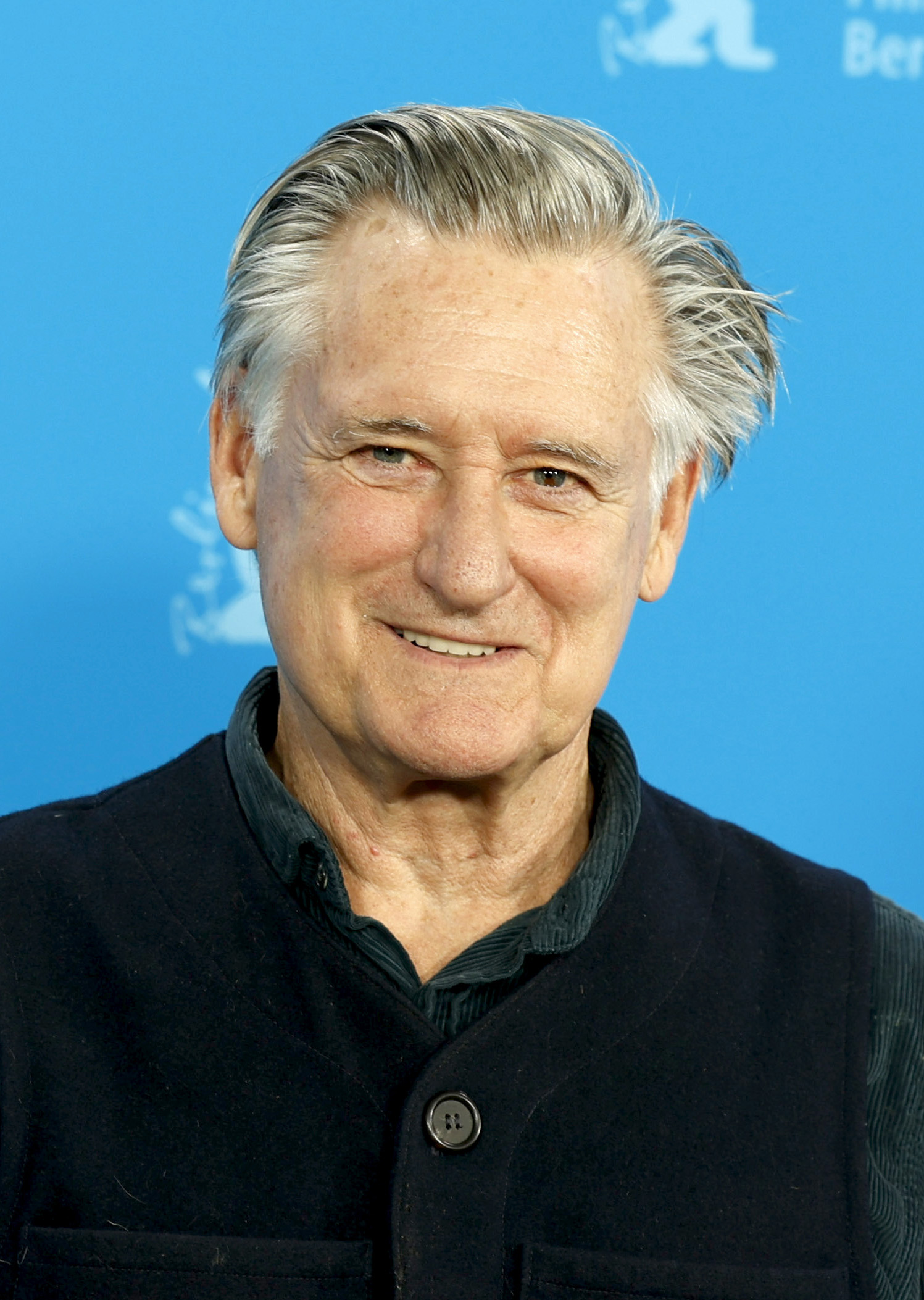
- Pullman in 2026
- Born: William Pullman; December 17, 1953 (age 72); Hornell, New York, U.S.
- Education: SUNY Delhi; SUNY Oneonta (BA); University of Massachusetts Amherst (MFA)
- Occupation: Actor
- Years active: 1986–present
- Spouse: Tamara Hurwitz (m. 1987)
- Children: 3, including Lewis

William Pullman (born December 17, 1953) is an American actor. After graduating with a Master of Fine Arts degree in theater, he was an adjunct professor at Montana State University, before deciding to pursue acting.

Pullman made his film debut in Ruthless People (1986), and starred in Spaceballs (1987), The Accidental Tourist and The Serpent and the Rainbow (both 1988), Newsies (1992), Sleepless in Seattle (1993), Wyatt Earp (1994), Casper, While You Were Sleeping (both 1995), Independence Day (1996), Lost Highway (1997), Zero Effect (1998) and Lake Placid (1999). He voiced Captain Joseph Korso in the animated science-fiction film Titan A.E. (2000). He has appeared frequently on television, usually in TV films. Since the beginning of the 21st century, Pullman has acted in miniseries and regular series such as Torchwood (2011), playing starring roles in 1600 Penn (2012–13) and The Sinner (2017–2021). In 2021, he had a recurring role in the miniseries Halston.

Pullman also has a long stage acting career. He has appeared on Broadway several times, including in Edward Albee's The Goat, or Who Is Sylvia? (2002).

== Early life and education ==
Pullman is of Dutch, English, and Irish ancestry.

After graduating from Hornell High School in 1971, he attended the State University of New York at Delhi (SUNY Delhi) and the State University of New York at Oneonta (SUNY Oneonta) in the 1970s, receiving a Bachelor of Arts degree in Theater Studies from the latter in 1975. He eventually received his Master of Fine Arts degree from the University of Massachusetts Amherst in 1980. He taught theater at SUNY Delhi and was an adjunct professor at Montana State University's School of Film and Photography in Bozeman, Montana, where his students persuaded him to pursue film roles.

== Career ==
During the 1980s, Pullman worked primarily with theater companies around New York and Los Angeles. His first prominent film role was in Ruthless People, starring Danny DeVito and Bette Midler. Other notable films included the protagonist Lone Starr in Spaceballs (1987), The Serpent and the Rainbow (1988) (with Zakes Mokae), A League of Their Own (1992), Malice (1993), Casper and While You Were Sleeping (both 1995). In 1996, he played the President of the United States in the sci-fi film Independence Day. A year later he had a major role in Lost Highway (1997) and voiced Korso in the animated post-apocalyptic film Titan A.E.

From February 2002 until September 2002, Pullman starred with Mercedes Ruehl in Edward Albee's play The Goat, or Who Is Sylvia? on Broadway. It won the 2002 Tony Award for Best Play, the 2002 Drama Desk Award Outstanding New Play, and the 2003 Pulitzer Prize for Drama. Pullman was nominated for the 2002 Drama Desk Award for Outstanding Actor in a Play.

He starred as Dr. Richard Massey in the 2005 miniseries Revelations. He appeared in Albee's play Peter and Jerry at off-Broadway's Second Stage Theatre in New York for which he received a second Drama Desk Award nomination for Outstanding Actor in a Play in 2008.

Pullman is also a creative writer. His first play, Expedition 6, is about the International Space Station mission Expedition 6, in orbit at the time the Space Shuttle Columbia was destroyed on reentry, grounding the U.S. Space Shuttle program and requiring the ISS crew to remain in orbit an additional two months. The play opened at San Francisco's Magic Theater in September 2007.

He also appeared in the Broadway production of David Mamet's play Oleanna, co-starring Julia Stiles. It opened at the John Golden Theatre on October 11, 2009, and closed on December 6, 2009, after 65 performances.

He is a jury member for the digital studio Filmaka, a platform for undiscovered filmmakers to show their work to industry professionals.

Pullman played Oswald Danes, a pedophile and child killer, in Torchwood: Miracle Day, the fourth series of the BBC/Starz Entertainment television show Torchwood (a spinoff to the BBC series Doctor Who), the former of which began airing in July 2011. For his performance as Danes, he received a Saturn Award nomination for Best Supporting Actor on Television.

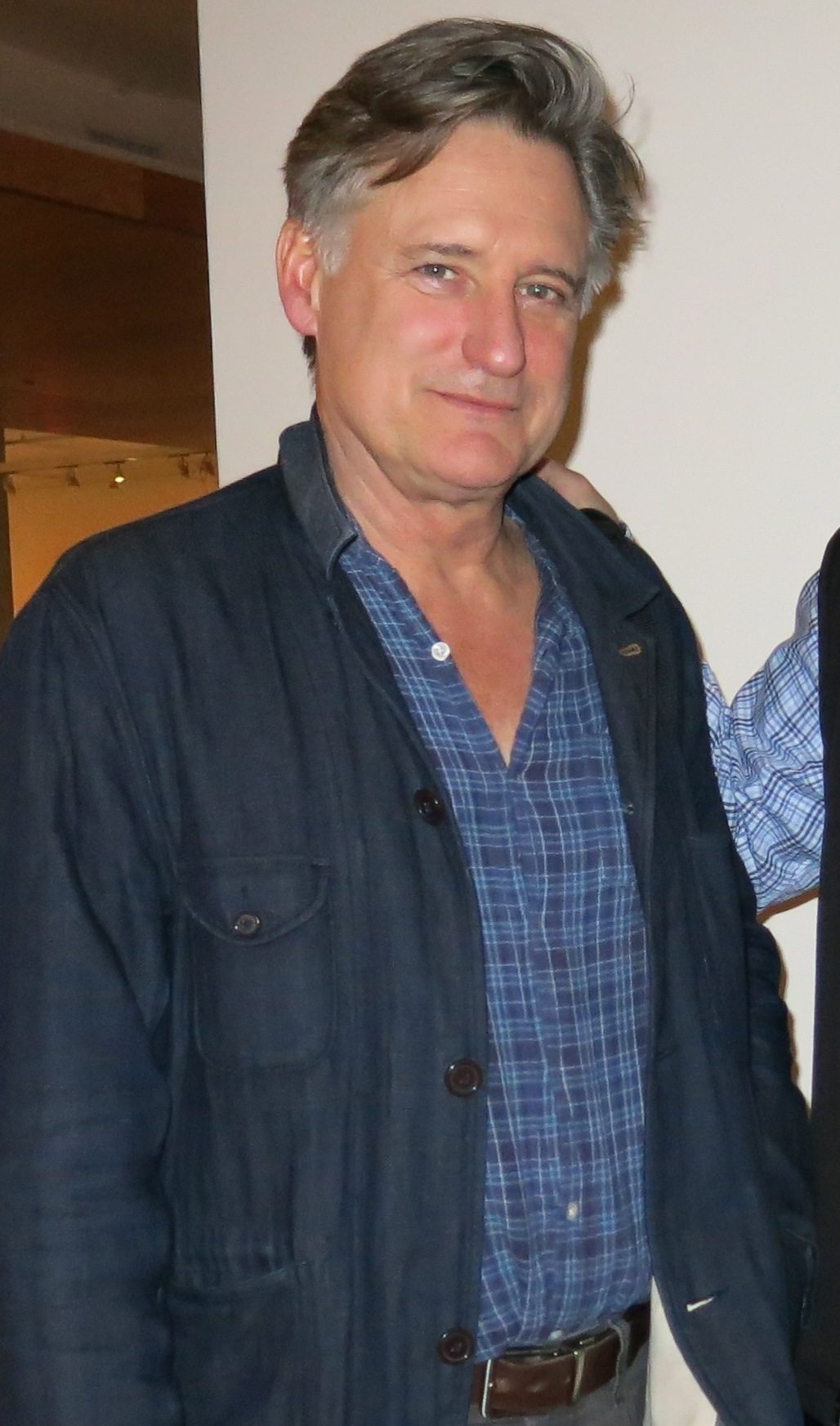
Pullman in 2014

From 2012 to 2013, Pullman portrayed the president of the United States in the television comedy series 1600 Penn. He played detective Harry Ambrose in the USA Network mystery series The Sinner, which premiered in 2017 and has aired for four seasons.

In 2023, Pullman portrayed Alex Murdaugh, a South Carolina attorney convicted of murdering his wife and son. The two-part Lifetime series Murdaugh Murders: The Movie premiered on October 14. In June 2025, Pullman was announced to reprise the role of Lone Star in the sequel to Spaceballs, Spaceballs: The New One, which is scheduled for release in 2027, and that he would be co-starring alongside his son Lewis Pullman.

In 2026, it was announced that he would make his Royal Shakespeare Company debut in the 2025–26 season production of The Cherry Orchard, playing Gaev.

His most recent role is as Jack Willard in the 2026 Netflix series The Boroughs.

== Personal life ==
Pullman is married to Tamara Hurwitz, a modern dancer. Their three children are actor Lewis Pullman, singer-songwriter Maesa Pullman, and Jack Pullman.

At the age of 21, Pullman suffered a head injury when he fell while rehearsing a play, and lost his sense of smell and the feeling in his left elbow.

Pullman is an avid Buffalo Bills fan. He co-owns a cattle ranch with his brother in Montana, near the town of Whitehall, where he lives part-time. He also serves on the board of trustees at Alfred University and was awarded an honorary doctorate there on May 14, 2011. In 2018, he received an honorary doctorate from Montana State University, where he was formerly employed.

== Filmography ==
=== Film ===
| Year | Film | Role | Notes |
|---|---|---|---|
| 1986 | Ruthless People | Earl Mott | |
| 1987 | Spaceballs | Lone Starr | |
| 1988 | The Serpent and the Rainbow | Dr. Dennis Alan | |
| 1988 | Rocket Gibraltar | Crow Black | |
| 1988 | The Accidental Tourist | Julian Edge | |
| 1989 | Cold Feet | Buck Latham | |
| 1990 | Brain Dead | Dr. Rex Martin | |
| 1990 | Sibling Rivalry | Nicholas Meany | |
| 1990 | Bright Angel | Bob | |
| 1991 | Liebestraum | Paul Kessler | |
| 1991 | Going Under | Biff Banner | |
| 1992 | Nervous Ticks | York Daley | |
| 1992 | Newsies | Bryan Denton | |
| 1992 | A League of Their Own | Bob Hinson | |
| 1992 | Singles | Dr. Jamison | |
| 1993 | Sommersby | Orin Meecham | |
| 1993 | Sleepless in Seattle | Walter Jackson | |
| 1993 | Malice | Andy Safian | |
| 1993 | Mr. Jones | Construction Site Foreman | Uncredited |
| 1994 | The Favor | Peter Whiting | |
| 1994 | Wyatt Earp | Ed Masterson | |
| 1994 | The Last Seduction | Clay Gregory | |
| 1995 | While You Were Sleeping | Jack Callaghan | |
| 1995 | Casper | Dr. James Harvey | |
| 1996 | Mr. Wrong | Whitman Crawford | |
| 1996 | Independence Day | President Thomas J. Whitmore | |
| 1997 | Lost Highway | Fred Madison | |
| 1997 | The End of Violence | Mike Max | |
| 1998 | Zero Effect | Daryl Zero | |
| 1999 | Lake Placid | Jack Wells | |
| 1999 | Brokedown Palace | Hank "Yankee Hank" Green | |
| 1999 | Spy Games | Harry Howe / Ernie Halliday | |
| 2000 | The Guilty | Callum Crane | |
| 2000 | Titan A.E. | Captain Joseph Korso | Voice |
| 2000 | Lucky Numbers | Detective Pat Lakewood | |
| 2000 | A Man Is Mostly Water | Parking Fascist | |
| 2001 | Ignition | Conor Gallagher | |
| 2002 | 29 Palms | The Ticket Clerk | |
| 2002 | Igby Goes Down | Jason Slocumb | |
| 2003 | Rick | Rick O'Lette | |
| 2004 | The Grudge | Peter Kirk | |
| 2005 | Dear Wendy | Officer Krugsby | |
| 2006 | Scary Movie 4 | Henry Hale | |
| 2006 | Alien Autopsy | Morgan Banner | |
| 2007 | Nobel Son | Max Mariner | |
| 2007 | You Kill Me | Dave | |
| 2008 | Surveillance | Sam Hallaway | |
| 2008 | Bottle Shock | Jim Barrett | |
| 2008 | Phoebe in Wonderland | Peter Lichten | |
| 2008 | Your Name Here | William J. Frick | |
| 2010 | Peacock | Edmund French | |
| 2010 | The Killer Inside Me | Billy Bob Walker | |
| 2010 | Rio Sex Comedy | William | |
| 2011 | Bringing Up Bobby | Kent | |
| 2012 | Lola Versus | Lenny | |
| 2013 | The Unbelievers | Himself | |
| 2014 | Red Sky | Captain John Webster | |
| 2014 | Cymbeline | Sicilius Leonatus | |
| 2014 | The Equalizer | Brian Plummer | |
| 2015 | American Ultra | Raymond Krueger | |
| 2016 | Independence Day: Resurgence | Former President Thomas J. Whitmore | |
| 2016 | LBJ | Senator Ralph Yarborough | |
| 2016 | Brother Nature | Jerry Turley | |
| 2017 | Walking Out | Clyde | |
| 2017 | The Ballad of Lefty Brown | "Lefty" Brown | |
| 2017 | Trouble | Ben | |
| 2017 | Battle of the Sexes | Jack Kramer | |
| 2018 | The Equalizer 2 | Brian Plummer | |
| 2019 | The Coldest Game | Joshua Mansky | |
| 2019 | Dark Waters | Harry Dietzler | |
| 2020 | The High Note | Max | |
| 2025 | Killing Faith | Preacher Ross | |
| 2026 | Everybody Digs Bill Evans | Harry Evans Senior | |
| 2026 | The Basics of Philosophy † | Melvyn Jorrisen | Post-production |
| 2027 | Spaceballs: The New One † | Lone Starr | Post-production |
| TBA | Famous † | | Post-production |

=== Television ===
| Year | Title | Role | Notes |
|---|---|---|---|
| 1986 | Cagney & Lacey | Dr. Giordano | Episode: "A Safe Place" |
| 1989 | Home Fires Burning | Henry Tibbets | Television movie |
| 1990 | The Tracey Ullman Show | Sheldon Moss | Episode: "The Word" |
| 1992 | Crazy in Love | Nick Symonds | Television movie |
| 1995 | Fallen Angels | Rich Thurber | Episode: "Tomorrow I Die" |
| 1996 | Mistrial | Steve Donohue | Television movie |
| 1997 | Merry Christmas, George Bailey | George Bailey | Television movie |
| 2000 | The Virginian | The Virginian | Television movie; also producer/director |
| 2001 | Night Visions | Major Ben Darnell | Episode: "A View Through the Window" |
| 2004 | Tiger Cruise | Commander Gary Dolan | Television movie |
| 2005 | Revelations | Richard Massey | 6 episodes |
| 2008 | Law & Order: Special Victims Unit | Kurt Moss | Episode: "Closet" |
| 2010 | Nathan vs. Nature | Arthur | Television movie |
| 2011 | Too Big to Fail | Jamie Dimon | Television movie |
| 2011 | Innocent | Rusty Sabich | Television movie |
| 2011 | Torchwood: Miracle Day | Oswald Danes | 8 episodes |
| 2012–2013 | 1600 Penn | President Dale Gilchrist | 13 episodes |
| 2017–2021 | The Sinner | Detective Harry Ambrose | Main cast; 32 episodes |
| 2021 | Halston | David J. Mahoney | 3 episodes |
| 2022 | Nature | Narrator | Episode: "American Horses" |
| 2023 | This Fool | Curtis | Episode: "The Bigger Man" |
| 2023 | Murdaugh Murders: The Movie | Alex Murdaugh | 2 episodes |
| 2026 | The Boroughs | Jack Willard | |

=== Stage ===
| Year | Title | Role | Theatre |
|---|---|---|---|
| 1989 | Demon Wine | Jimmie | Los Angeles Theatre Center |
| 2002 | The Goat, or Who Is Sylvia? | Martin | John Golden Theatre |
| 2007 | Peter and Jerry | Peter | Second Stage Theatre |
| 2009 | Oleanna | John | John Golden Theatre |
| 2012 | The Other Place | Ian | Samuel J. Friedman Theatre |
| 2014 | Sticks and Bones | Ozzie | Pershing Square Signature Center |
| 2015 | Othello | Othello | Den Nationale Scene |
| 2015 | The Jacksonian | Fred Weber | Theatre Three at Theatre Row |
| 2019 | All My Sons | Joe Keller | Old Vic Theatre |
| 2022 | Mad House | Daniel | Ambassadors Theatre |
| 2026 | The Cherry Orchard | Gaev | Swan Theatre |

== Awards and nominations ==
| Year | Award | Category | Nominated work | Result |
|---|---|---|---|---|
| 1997 | Online Film & Television Association | Best Sci-Fi/Fantasy/Horror Actor | Independence Day | Nominated |
| 2001 | Western Heritage Awards | Television Feature Film | The Virginian | Won |
| 2002 | Drama Desk Award | Outstanding Actor in a Play | The Goat, or Who Is Sylvia? | Nominated |
| 2008 | CineVegas International Film Festival | Special Jury Prize | Your Name Here | Won |
| 2008 | Denver International Film Festival | John Cassavetes Award | Himself | Won |
| 2008 | RiverRun International Film Festival | Master of Cinema | Himself | Won |
| 2008 | Drama Desk Award | Outstanding Actor in a Play | Peter and Jerry | Nominated |
| 2012 | Saturn Awards | Best Supporting Actor on Television | Torchwood: Miracle Day | Nominated |
| 2014 | Drama Desk Award | Outstanding Featured Actor in a Play | The Jacksonian | Nominated |
| 2015 | Drama Desk Award | Outstanding Actor in a Play | Sticks and Bones | Nominated |
| 2016 | CinemaCon Award | Ensemble of the Universe | Independence Day: Resurgence | Won |
| 2016 | Locarno International Film Festival | Excellence Award | Himself | Won |
| 2017 | Woodstock Film Festival | Excellence in Acting Award | Himself | Won |
| 2018 | Critics' Choice Television Awards | Best Actor in a Movie/Miniseries | The Sinner | Nominated |
| 2019 | Screen Actors Guild Awards | Outstanding Performance by a Male Actor in a Television Movie or Limited Series | The Sinner | Nominated |
| 2019 | Saturn Awards | Best Actor on Television | The Sinner | Nominated |
