= Paul Sparks =

American actor (born 1971)

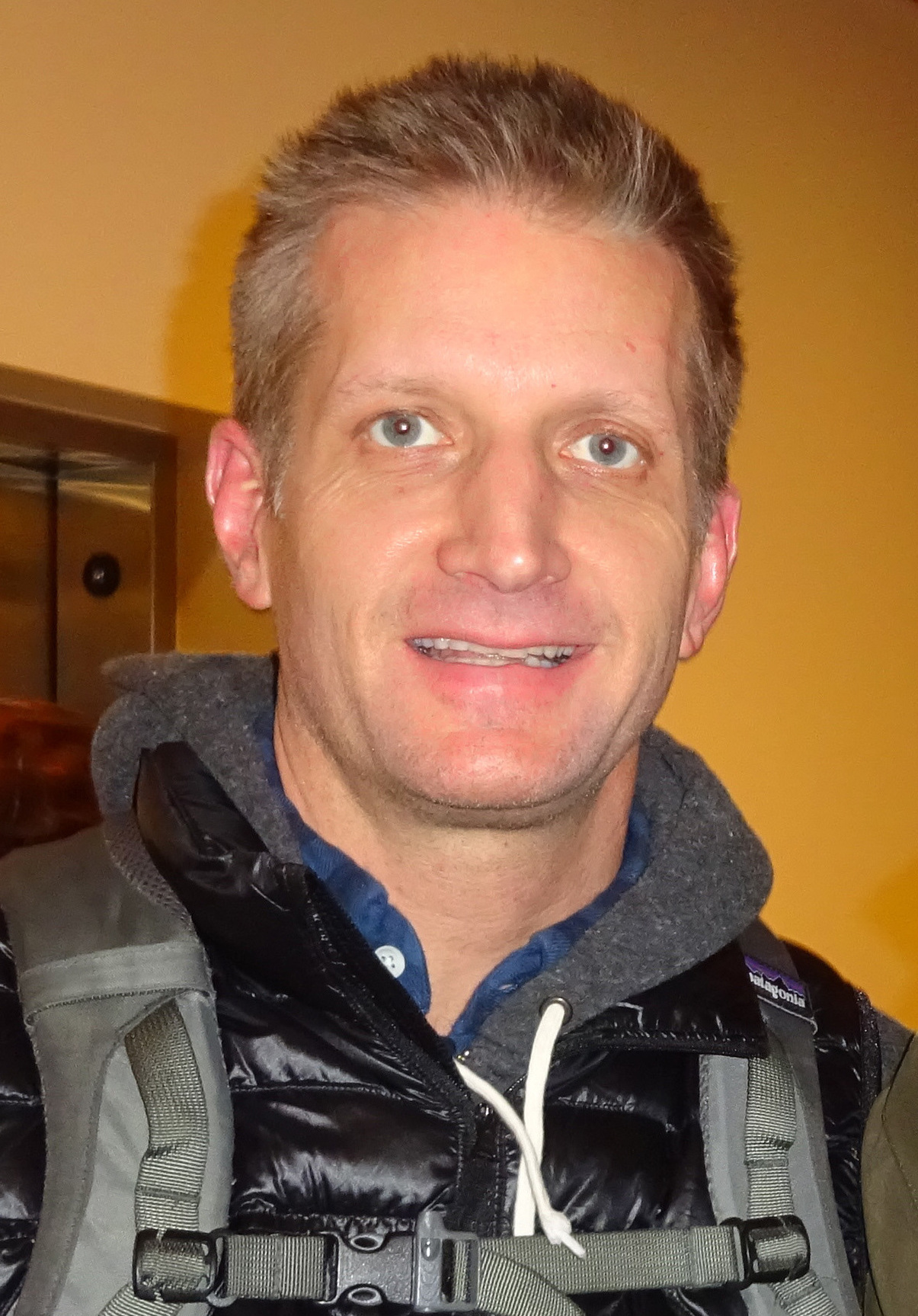
- Sparks in 2016
- Born: October 16, 1971 (age 54); Lawton, Oklahoma, U.S.
- Education: New York University (BFA)
- Occupation: Actor
- Years active: 1998–present
- Spouse: Annie Parisse
- Children: 2

Paul Sparks (born October 16, 1971) is an American actor. He is known for his roles as gangster Mickey Doyle in the HBO period drama series Boardwalk Empire, writer Thomas Yates in the Netflix political drama series House of Cards, mall owner John Breem in the Apple TV+ comedy-drama series Physical, attorney David Tellis in the Starz anthology drama series The Girlfriend Experience, and a recurring role in the limited series The Night Of. Sparks has also starred in the films Deception (2008), Afterschool (2008), The Missing Person (2008), Mud (2012), Parkland (2013), Stealing Cars (2015), Thoroughbreds (2017), and The Greatest Showman (2017).

== Early life and education ==
Sparks was born in Lawton, Oklahoma, and grew up in nearby Marlow. He attended Marlow High School, where his father coached football, graduating in 1990. While attending school in Marlow, Paul was a part of the Marlow Outlaw Speech Team (M.O.S.T.) where he was coached by Paula and Gary McConnell. Sparks earned a scholarship to Oklahoma State University to study chemistry, but later transferred to New York University's Tisch School of the Arts. He graduated with a Bachelor of Fine Arts degree in drama in 1995.

== Career ==
In 2010, Sparks began portraying the regular role of Mickey Doyle on HBO's drama series Boardwalk Empire, which was created by Terence Winter and executive produced by Martin Scorsese and Mark Wahlberg. The series ended in 2014, after completing five seasons.

== Personal life ==
Sparks is married to actress Annie Parisse, after meeting in 2005. Together they have two children, son Emmett (born 2009), and daughter Lydia (born 2014). Sparks has diabetes mellitus type 1 and works with the Juvenile Diabetes Research Foundation. He is good friends with fellow actor Michael Shannon; the two have worked together on a number of projects including Waco, The Missing Person, Mud, Boardwalk Empire, and Midnight Special and The Bikeriders.

== Filmography ==
=== Film ===
Year	Title	Role	Notes
2005	Headspace	Jason	
2006	The Treatment	Andre	
2007	Blackbird	Baylis	
2008	Synecdoche, New York	Derek	
2008	Rachel Getting Married	12 Step Member	
2008	Deception	Detective Burke	
2008	Afterschool	Detective Eclisse	
2008	The Missing Person	Gus Papitos	
2008	The Understudy	Bobby	
2010	Please Give	Blind Date	
2010	Edge of Darkness	Police Detective	
2011	Return	Ed	
2012	Forgetting the Girl	Tanner	
2012	Mud	Carver	
2012	Sparrows Dance	Wes	
2013	Trust Me	Ray	
2013	Parkland	Harry McCormick	
2015	Stealing Cars	Conrad Sean Lewis	
2016	Midnight Special	Agent Miller	
2016	All the Birds Have Flown South	Stephen	
2016	In the Radiant City	Michael Yurley	
2017	Thoroughbreds	Mark	
2017	The Greatest Showman	James Gordon Bennett Sr.	
2019	Human Capital	Jon	
2020	The Lovebirds	Moustache	
2021	Giving Birth to a Butterfly	Daryl	
2021	Hands That Bind	Andy Hollis	
2023	Eric Larue	Steve Calhan	
2023	The Bikeriders	Gary Rogue Leader	
2024	Lost on a Mountain in Maine	Mr. Donald Fendler	
2026	The Mortuary Assistant	Raymond Delver	
TBA	Liminal		Filming
TBA	Rooster		Post-production
TBA	A Great Depression	Mark Turner	Post-production

=== Television ===
Year	Title	Role	Notes
1998	Trinity	Rod	Episode: "In a Yellow Wood"
2000	Law & Order	Paul Luterik	Episode: "Panic"
2001	Law & Order: Special Victims Unit	Marvin Posey	Episode: "Manhunt"
2005	Law & Order: Criminal Intent	Keith Durbin	Episode: "Shibboleth"
2006	Brotherhood	Aaron	3 episodes
2010–2014	Boardwalk Empire	Mickey Doyle	36 episodes
2011	Mildred Pierce	Ted Hobey	Episode: "Part Five"
2012–2013	Underemployed	Guy Doyle	3 episodes
2013	M.Y.C.	Mickey Mothstein	Television short
2013	Person of Interest	Wilson	Episode: "Relevance"
2014	Believe	Karl McKenzie	Episode: "Bang and Blame"
2015–2017	House of Cards	Thomas Yates	27 episodes
2016	The Girlfriend Experience	David Tellis	12 episodes
2016	The Night Of	Don Taylor	6 episodes
2017	Get Shorty	Owen	Episode: "The Pitch"
2017	The Crown	Billy Graham	Episode: "Vergangenheit"
2018	Waco	Steve Schneider	6 episodes
2018–2019	Sweetbitter	Howard	Main role
2019	Castle Rock	John "Ace" Merrill	10 episodes
2021–2023	Physical	John Breem	Main role
2021	Joe Pickett	Wacey Hedeman	Main role
2025	The Better Sister	Ken Winnick	4 Episodes
2025	The Lowdown	Pastor Mark Sternwick	4 Episodes

=== Stage ===
Year	Title	Role	Location/Company
2000	Coyote on a Fence	Bobby Reyburn	Urban Stages
2003–2004	Take Me Out	Jason Chenier	Walter Kerr Theatre
2003–2004	Take Me Out	Shane Mungitt	Walter Kerr Theatre
2003–2004	Take Me Out	Kippy Sunderstrom	Walter Kerr Theatre
2004	Blackbird	Baylis	Edge Theater Company
2005	Orange Flower Water	Brad Youngquist	Edge Theater Company
2006	Landscape of the Body	Marvin Holahan	Signature Theatre Company
2007	Essential Self-Defense	Yul Carroll	Edge Theater Company
2009	Hedda Gabler	Ejlert Lovborg	American Airlines Theatre
2010	Dusk Rings a Bell	Ray	Atlantic Theater Company
2016	Buried Child	Tilden	The New Group
2018	Edward Albee's At Home at the Zoo	Jerry	Signature Theatre
2023	Grey House	Henry	Lyceum Theatre, Broadway
2023	Waiting for Godot	Vladimir	Theatre for a New Audience
2025	Grangeville	Jerry	Signature Theatre

== Awards and nominations ==
Year	Association	Category	Work	Result
2000	Drama Desk Awards	Outstanding Actor in a Play	Coyote on a Fence	Nominated
2004	Drama Desk Awards	Outstanding Actor in a Play	Blackbird	Nominated
2005	Drama Desk Awards	Outstanding Featured Actor in a Play	Orange Flower Water	Nominated
2007	Drama Desk Awards	Outstanding Actor in a Play	Essential Self-Defense	Nominated
2010	Screen Actors Guild Awards	Outstanding Performance by an Ensemble in a Drama Series	Boardwalk Empire	Won
2011	Screen Actors Guild Awards	Outstanding Performance by an Ensemble in a Drama Series	Boardwalk Empire	Won
2011	Drama Desk Awards	Outstanding Actor in a Play	Dusk Rings a Bell	Nominated
2012	Screen Actors Guild Awards	Outstanding Performance by an Ensemble in a Drama Series	Boardwalk Empire	Nominated
2013	Screen Actors Guild Awards	Outstanding Performance by an Ensemble in a Drama Series	Boardwalk Empire	Nominated
2013	Film Independent Spirit Awards	Robert Altman Award	Mud	Won
2014	Screen Actors Guild Awards	Outstanding Performance by an Ensemble in a Drama Series	Boardwalk Empire	Nominated
2016	Lucille Lortel Awards	Outstanding Featured Actor in a Play	Buried Child	Nominated
2016	Primetime Emmy Awards	Outstanding Guest Actor in a Drama Series	House of Cards	Nominated
2018	Lucille Lortel Awards	Outstanding Featured Actor in a Play	Edward Albee's At Home at the Zoo	Nominated
2018	Drama Desk Awards	Outstanding Actor in a Play	Edward Albee's At Home at the Zoo	Nominated
2018	Drama League Awards	Distinguished Performance	Edward Albee's At Home at the Zoo	Nominated
2018	Outer Critics Circle Awards	Outstanding Featured Actor in a Play	Edward Albee's At Home at the Zoo	Nominated
2025	Lucille Lortel Awards	Outstanding Lead Performer in a Play	Grangeville	Nominated
2025	Drama Desk Awards	Outstanding Lead Performance in a Play	Grangeville	Nominated
2025	Outer Critics Circle Awards	Outstanding Lead Performer in an Off-Broadway Play	Grangeville	Nominated
