= Mud (2012 film) =

2012 American film by Jeff Nichols

- Theatrical release poster
- Directed by: Jeff Nichols
- Written by: Jeff Nichols
- Produced by: Lisa Maria Falcone; Sarah Green; Aaron Ryder
- Starring: Matthew McConaughey; Tye Sheridan; Sam Shepard; Michael Shannon; Joe Don Baker; Ray McKinnon; Sarah Paulson; Paul Sparks; Jacob Lofland; Reese Witherspoon
- Cinematography: Adam Stone
- Edited by: Julie Monroe
- Music by: David Wingo
- Production companies: Everest Entertainment; Brace Cove Productions; FilmNation Entertainment
- Distributed by: Lionsgate; Roadside Attractions
- Release dates: May 26, 2012 (Cannes); April 26, 2013 (United States)
- Running time: 130 minutes
- Country: United States
- Language: English
- Budget: $10 million
- Box office: $32.6 million

Mud is a 2012 American independent Southern Gothic coming-of-age drama film written and directed by Jeff Nichols. Set along the Mississippi River in rural Arkansas, the film follows two teenage boys, Ellis (Tye Sheridan) and Neckbone (Jacob Lofland), who encounter a fugitive named Mud (Matthew McConaughey) hiding on a small island. They agree to help him repair a boat, evade bounty hunters, and reunite with his estranged lover, Juniper (Reese Witherspoon). Sam Shepard and Michael Shannon also star. The film was Joe Don Baker's last appearance before his death in 2025.

Mud competed for the Palme d'Or at the 2012 Cannes Film Festival, where it received an 18-minute standing ovation. It was also shown at the Sundance Film Festival in January 2013. The film opened on April 26, 2013, with a limited release in select theaters, before having a wide release on May 10. Mud performed well at the box office, grossing $32.6 million on a $10 million budget, and received critical acclaim.

== Plot ==
Ellis and Neckbone, two teenage boys living near DeWitt, Arkansas, are excited to find an abandoned boat lodged in a tree on a small island in the Mississippi River, a remnant of a past flood. However, the boat is already inhabited by a man named Mud, a disheveled but charismatic fugitive whom the boys encounter a short time later. Mud asks for some food, promising them the boat in exchange once he is gone.

Returning with food, the boys ask Mud why he is hiding out. Mud reveals he is waiting for his girlfriend Juniper, whom he describes as beautiful, with distinctive nightingale tattoos on her hands. The boys later spot Juniper in town. Meanwhile, Ellis falls for an older girl named May Pearl.

Ellis learns that his parents are heading for divorce over his mother's desire to move into town. This threatens their old river houseboat: if no longer used as a residence by the owner, it will be demolished by the River Authority. Later, at a roadblock, Ellis finds out Mud is a wanted fugitive, but denies having seen him.

The boys confront Mud over the discovery. Mud explains that he killed a man who had gotten Juniper pregnant and pushed her down a flight of stairs, causing her to lose the child. Mud now plans to use the boat to escape and promises the boys his pistol instead for their continued assistance.

Mud sends Ellis to his neighbor Tom Blankenship, (Note: In his autobiography, Mark Twain identifies his childhood friend Tom Blankenship as the inspiration for his character Huckleberry Finn.) an older father figure from Mud's childhood, to ask for help. Tom agrees to talk to Mud; however, upon learning Mud is in trouble over Juniper again, he refuses to help. Mud gives the boys a note for Juniper. They find her motel room where Carver—the brother of the man Mud killed—is abusing her. Ellis and Neckbone tell Mud about the man, and Mud realizes that the family of the man he killed has come for revenge.

Stealing machine parts and an outboard motor from junkyards, the boys help Mud repair the boat, and coordinate a plan with Juniper to bring her to Mud so they can escape together down the river. On the designated day, Juniper does not show up. Ellis and Neck find her flirting with another man at a nearby bar and tell Mud what has happened.

Ellis brings a note from Mud to Juniper, telling her he accepts that it's over between them. Juniper tells Ellis that she loves Mud, but that he is a born liar and she cannot spend the rest of her life following his itinerant lifestyle. Ellis is deeply disillusioned by the sudden dissolution of what he believed to be a couple deeply in love. Soon after, May Pearl rejects and humiliates Ellis in front of her friends. These events seem to confirm for Ellis his father's admonishment, in the wake of the pending divorce, that women cannot be trusted.

Ellis confronts Mud and calls him a liar and a coward for giving up on Juniper. Running away, Ellis falls into a pit containing cottonmouths and is bitten. Mud jumps in and rescues him, racing to get the unconscious Ellis to a clinic on the mainland. Recognizing Mud, one of the hospital employees calls the police, who tip off Carver and his father King.

Evading his pursuers, Mud gets back to the island where he and Neckbone launch the repaired boat into the water. As promised, Mud gives Neckbone his empty pistol. Mud wants to say goodbye to Ellis, so Neckbone takes him to Ellis's family's houseboat, where he is recovering. Mud sneaks into Ellis's room, and Ellis tells Mud he is sorry for what he said. Mud replies Ellis was right about most of what he said, and that he is not a good man. Ellis then shares his father's advice about women. Mud disagrees, and says that Ellis is a good man and if he finds a girl half as good as he is, he'll be alright.

While Mud is in Ellis's room, Carver and his posse arrive and start shooting. Tom, a former Marine marksman, fires from his boat using his old sniper rifle, killing several attackers from across the river. Mud saves Ellis and tries to get away but is shot as he dives into the river. The police arrive and find all the posse members dead. One trooper calls King to tell him that his other son is now dead. Police divers search for Mud's body all night. The morning after the shootout, Tom disappears.

Ellis's parents separate. He and his mother move to an apartment in town and Ellis's father gets a new job far away. Ellis and Neckbone watch the houseboat get demolished as Ellis shares that he is uncertain of Mud's fate but still believes he was protecting Juniper. As Ellis's father departs, he tells Ellis to take care of his mother because this change is hard on her too, showing a more mature and changed attitude toward their situation. He assures Ellis he'll see him again in a week and tells Ellis he loves him, to which Ellis reciprocates. Ellis sees some attractive older teenage girls in his new neighborhood – one of them waves to him and he smiles.

Several days later, Mud is revealed to be alive and recovering on the repaired boat, driven by Tom. They look ahead at the mouth of the Mississippi River, and south of that, the Gulf of Mexico.

== Cast ==
- Matthew McConaughey as Mud
- Reese Witherspoon as Juniper
- Tye Sheridan as Ellis
- Jacob Lofland as Neckbone
- Sam Shepard as Tom Blankenship
- Ray McKinnon as Senior
- Sarah Paulson as Mary Lee
- Michael Shannon as Galen
- Joe Don Baker as King
- Paul Sparks as Carver
- Bonnie Sturdivant as May Pearl
- Stuart Greer as Miller

== Production ==
=== Development ===
Jeff Nichols, an Arkansas native, wrote and directed Mud as his third feature film following Take Shelter (2011). He began developing the script in 2006, writing the first 30 pages before pausing, as he felt unready creatively and mentally to complete it, ultimately spending about five years refining the story.

The film's inspirations drew heavily from Mark Twain's Adventures of Huckleberry Finn and The Adventures of Tom Sawyer, capturing themes of river adventure and boyhood exploration in a modern context. Nichols, who first read Tom Sawyer at age 13, sought to evoke the essence of childhood as Twain had "bottled" it, while incorporating personal memories from his upbringing near the Mississippi Delta. A central motif of the film is the impact of fractured families, where Mud's obsessive and toxic romance with Juniper is contrasted against the more grounded, redemptive bonds of family and friendship that ultimately sustain the young protagonists.

Nichols always had McConaughey in mind for the title role, after seeing him in Lone Star (1996). In May 2011, Chris Pine was first in talks for the lead role. McConaughey was cast as Mud the following August and was joined by Reese Witherspoon. Witherspoon was at the same agency as Nichols, so he was able to approach her for the role of Juniper.

Nichols specifically wrote the role of Mud for McConaughey, envisioning him as the fugitive character from the outset. For the teenage role of Neckbone, over 2,000 boys auditioned, and 15-year-old Jacob Lofland from Yell County, Arkansas, was cast.

The film was fully financed by Everest Entertainment and produced by Everest and FilmNation Entertainment. Filmed primarily in Arkansas, Mud benefited from state tax incentives totaling $1.4 million.

=== Filming ===
Nichols started shooting Mud in his home state of Arkansas on September 26, 2011. Filming took eight weeks and concluded on November 19. He filmed in Southeast Arkansas; locations included Dumas (in the Arkansas Delta Lowlands area), De Witt, Lake Village (near the Mississippi River), Crocketts Bluff (on the White River), and Stuttgart. The island in the film was located in the Mississippi River outside the city of Eudora. The cast and crew numbered over 100 people, around half of whom were Arkansas residents. Over 400 locals were also involved as extras. According to the state government's Economic Development Commission, "Mud is the largest production ever to be filmed in the state." Nichols said about filming in parts of Southeast Arkansas, "These places and people have such a particular accent and culture, and they're quickly getting homogenized. I wanted to capture a snapshot of a place that probably won't be there forever."

Mud's cinematographer Adam Stone used a Steadicam for filming. Stone, who was also a cinematographer for Nichols's previous films Shotgun Stories and Take Shelter, said, "If you look at Shotgun Stories, the camera is fairly moored. With Take Shelter, we had a lot more dolly work. In Mud, the camera never really sits still. The locations were either super-remote or really small and cramped, so the Steadicam was the only thing that could get in there." The film was shot on Kodak VISION3 35 mm film stocks in the anamorphic format with Panavision G-Series lenses.

Matthew McConaughey prepared for his role by immersing himself on the remote Arkansas river island set, drawing from local dialects and real-life drifter stories to inhabit the character's eccentric, fugitive persona.

== Release ==
Mud premiered on May 26, 2012, at the 2012 Cannes Film Festival, where it had a competition slot for the festival's prizes including the Palme d'Or. The screening reportedly earned an 18-minute standing ovation from the audience. Reuters reported that the film "[earned] warm applause at a press screening". Variety's film critics Justin Chang and Peter Debruge considered Mud one of their favorites of the film festival. Debruge said the film was reminiscent of the novel Huckleberry Finn: "It so elegantly addresses what masculinity and family really mean in the heartland." He said the Mississippi River in Mud was "a mythic backdrop... in which old values struggle against stronger modern forces in the world".

After its Cannes premiere, no distributor immediately purchased rights to release the film in the United States. By August 2012, Lionsgate and Roadside Attractions acquired rights to distribute Mud in the United States. In January 2013, Mud screened at the 2013 Sundance Film Festival, and the Austin American-Statesman reported, "His modern take on Mark Twain played to an enthusiastic sold-out crowd of more than 500 people."

=== Home media ===
Lionsgate Home Entertainment released Mud on DVD and Blu-ray on August 6, 2013. The releases included an audio commentary with writer-director Jeff Nichols, the featurette "A Very Personal Tale: Writing and Directing Mud," and several making-of featurettes. Home video sales generated an estimated $9.46 million in domestic revenue.

== Reception ==
=== Box office ===
The film opened in a limited release on April 26, 2013, in 363 theaters and grossed $2,215,891 with an average of $6,104 per theater and ranking #11 at the box office. The film then expanded on May 10, 2013, and grossed $2,538,599, with an average of $2,980 per theater, ranking number eight at the box office. The film ended up earning $21,590,086 in North America and $11,023,087 in other markets for a worldwide total of $32,613,173, against a $10 million budget.

=== Critical response ===
Mud received positive reviews from critics. On Rotten Tomatoes the film has an approval rating of 97% based on 183 reviews, with an average rating of 7.8/10. The site's critical consensus reads, "Bolstered by a strong performance from Matthew McConaughey in the title role, Mud offers an engaging Southern drama that manages to stay sweet and heartwarming without being sappy." On Metacritic, the film has a score of 76 out of 100 based on 35 critics, indicating "generally favorable reviews".

David Denby, writing in The New Yorker, praised the director: "Nichols has developed a talent for intimacy and for continuous tension—he could be developing into one of the great movie storytellers...[the film, as a whole] plays with a depth and psychological acuteness almost never found in our movies anymore." Quoting The Wrap's report that the film played very strongly in the South, Godfrey Cheshire writes that he was not surprised: "Mud is the best Southern film I've seen in ages." Singling out McConaughey's performance, The Village Voice described it as "the latest in McConaughey's campaign for reconsideration as a great American actor".

Roger Ebert awarded the film 3.5 out of 4 stars, writing that Mud "never comes unmoored from reality or drifts off into lazy abstraction and cliché. Nichols’ eye for particulars, his feel for the characters and landscapes (and waterscapes), is so vivid you feel you could get bit by a mosquito or a water moccasin if you’re not careful."

== Music ==
The original score for Mud was composed by David Wingo, a frequent collaborator with writer-director Jeff Nichols, having previously worked together on Take Shelter (2011). Wingo's music features a subtle, atmospheric style that evokes the rural Southern setting through sparse instrumentation and ambient elements.

The soundtrack album, Mud (Original Motion Picture Soundtrack), was released digitally on April 23, 2013, by Lakeshore Records, comprising 29 tracks of original score and select songs. Key licensed songs include Lucero's "Take You Away," written by Ben Nichols (the director's brother), and The Beach Boys' "Help Me, Rhonda," which appears in scenes involving Galen.

== Accolades ==
Mud has received numerous awards and nominations. It received the Robert Altman Award at the 29th Independent Spirit Awards for its film director, casting director, and ensemble cast. The Independent Spirit Awards also nominated Jeff Nichols for Best Director.

Tye Sheridan was nominated for the Critics' Choice Award for Best Young Actor/Actress. The film received the Grand Prix from the Belgian Film Critics Association.

Mud was named one of the Top Ten Independent Films of 2013 by the National Board of Review.

== Legacy ==
Mud played a significant role in revitalizing Matthew McConaughey's career, marking the onset of his "McConaissance" era that culminated in an Academy Award for Best Actor for Dallas Buyers Club (2013). For newcomer Tye Sheridan, the film served as a breakout, propelling him to prominent roles including the lead in Steven Spielberg's Ready Player One (2018).

The film garnered acclaim for its authentic portrayal of rural Southern white communities, avoiding reductive stereotypes by depicting their complexities with nuance and respect.
