= Drew Starkey =

American actor (born 1993)

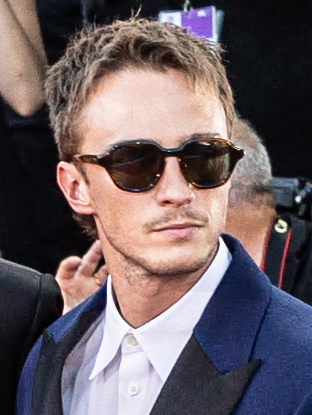
- Starkey in 2024
- Born: Joseph Andrew Starkey; November 4, 1993 (age 32); Asheville, North Carolina, U.S.
- Education: Western Carolina University
- Occupation: Actor
- Years active: 2014–present
- Father: Todd Starkey

Joseph Andrew Starkey (born November 4, 1993) is an American actor. He began his career with supporting roles in the teen drama films Love, Simon and The Hate U Give (both in 2018). He gained recognition for his portrayal of troubled teenager Rafe Cameron in Outer Banks (2020–2026), and as Eugene Allerton in Queer (2024).

== Early life and education ==
Joseph Andrew Starkey was born in Asheville, North Carolina, on November 4, 1993. He is the son of Todd Starkey, a college basketball coach. His family moved around the Blue Ridge Mountains area, but he mostly grew up in Hickory, North Carolina.

As a child, he played baseball and basketball, and learned to play the guitar and the piano. He attended St. Stephens High School in Hickory. In his freshman year of high school, he became serious about acting after joining a drama class.

Starkey graduated from Western Carolina University in 2016, where he double majored in English and theater performance. After college, he moved to Atlanta to join two friends who were forming a production company, and started to audition for roles.

== Filmography ==
Key
†	Denotes works that have not yet been released

=== Film ===
Year	Title	Role	Notes
2018	American Animals	Frat Boy	
2018	Love, Simon	Garrett Laughlin	
2018	The Hate U Give	Brian MacIntosh Jr. (Officer 115)	
2019	Just Mercy	Young Guard	
2020	The Devil All the Time	Tommy Matson	
2020	Embattled	Tanner Van Holt	
2022	Hellraiser	Trevor	
2023	The Other Zoey	Zach MacLaren	
2024	Queer	Eugene Allerton	
2026	Onslaught	Cyrus	
2027	Deep Cuts †	Joe Morrow	Post-production
TBA	King Snake †	TBA	Filming

=== Television ===
Year	Title	Role	Notes
2017	Mercy Street	Gambling Soldier	Episode: "Unknown Soldier"
2017	Shots Fired	Clint Jr.	Episode: "Hour Four: Truth"
2017	Ozark	Boy	Episode: "Ruling Days"
2017	Dead Silent	Ethan Walton	Episode: "Run for Your Life"
2017	Valor	Bobby	Episode: "Zero Visibility"
2017	Good Behavior	Agent Bradfield	Episode: "You Could Discover Me"
2018	Brockmire	Brad Christie (uncredited)	Episode: "In the Cellar"
2018	Bobcat Goldthwait's Misfits & Monsters	Hunter Robison	Episode: "Better World"
2018	The Resident	Young Lawyer	Episode: "About Time"
2019	Doom Patrol	Tim	Episode: "Donkey Patrol"
2019	Queen Sugar	Beau	Episode: "I No Longer Imagine"
2019	Scream: Resurrection	Hawkins	4 episodes
2019	Dolly Parton's Heartstrings	Lookout	Episode: "J.J. Sneed"
2020	Limbo	Rodney	TV movie
2020	Acting for a Cause	Demetrius	Episode: "A Midsummer Night's Dream"
2020−2026	Outer Banks	Rafe Cameron	Main role; 49 episodes
2022	The Terminal List	Junior Alba	4 episodes
2026	Lucky	Cary	2 episodes

== Awards and nominations ==
Year	Award	Category	Nominated work	Result	Ref.
2020	IndieX Film Festival	Best Ensemble Cast (shared with Pat Dortch, Lacy Camp, and Gary Weeks)	Limbo	Won	
2025	Brazil Online Film Award	Best Supporting Actor	Queer	Nominated	
2025	Dorian Awards	GALECA: The Society of LGBTQ Entertainment Critic Rising Star of the Year	Queer	Nominated	
2025	North Carolina Film Critics Association	Tar Heel Award	Queer	Nominated	
