= Orange Flower Water =

Dramatic play

Orange Flower Water is a dramatic play written by Craig Wright published in August 2004. The Chicago Tribune describes the play as "Uncommonly intense and intimate ninety-minute drama." "A brutally honest drama about marriage and infidelity" by Chicago Sun-Times, and "Simultaneously visceral, with crackling humor, and intellectual." by Star Tribune.

== Characters and setting ==
Characters

David Calhoun, a pharmacist, 30s-40s

Cathy Calhoun, a choir director wife of David, 30s-40s

Brad Youngquist, owner of video rental stores, 30s-40s

Beth Youngquist, wife of Brad, 30s-40s

Setting

Present day in various locations of Pine City, Minnesota. The set is composed of a bed and nightstand, with a telephone, and four chairs.

== Synopsis ==
=== Scene 1 ===
Cathy recites a message to her husband, David, gives exposition of happy marriage. She speaks of their three children Annie, Ruthie, and Gus and their schedule for the week while she is away for a choir festival. Cathy ends the letter expressing her deep love for David. She signs off with "Yours more truly than truly could ever say."

=== Scene 2 ===
David and Beth are lying in bed. David prompts Beth to imagine herself far away from Pine City, "in a bay in a kingdom in the clouds." Beth realizes that he’s coming on to her and protests. David expresses his feelings of true love and tells Beth that when he is with her, he is really living. Beth has reservations, since they are both already married and their affair could affect their families. Although David wishes he didn't have to hurt others to find his happiness, it’s a price he is willing to pay to live his dream.

The argument fades and Beth shares a recent dream that she and David had a four-year-old daughter named Lily. In the dream, Beth, David, and Lily are driving home after shopping for ingredients to make Christmas cookies together. In the back seat, little Lily gets ahold of a bottle of orange flower water that they bought and spills it all over the back seat, filling the car with the scent of oranges. “We were all giggling and laughing. We were truly happy.”

Even after confessing her dream, Beth still has reservations about ruining their current relationships. David harps on Beth for her husband's inattentive behavior. Beth moves to leave. Disappointed at his failed attempt to be intimate with Beth and upsetting her in the process, David tries to convince her to reconsider. She concedes.

=== Scene 3 ===
Brad and David meet and face out toward the audience as if they are watching a soccer game. They are discussing one of the better players when Brad steers the conversation to a moment of "Desert Island" asking David if he were stranded whether he would take his children's ballet teacher or one of the player's mothers, Katie Amundson. David, playing along, said he would choose Katie. Brad starts to objectify the women in question and the game continues. Brad then asks whether or not David would take Beth or Katie. Bewildered, David answers "I don't know, what about Cathy?" This is to say that he wants Brad to choose between Cathy and Katie. Brad chooses Cathy without hesitation and asks David if he would choose Beth over Cathy. As he asks, the game ends. David hesitates to answer but Brad doesn't seem to be paying attention and changes the subject. The two men part ways with the question still unanswered.

=== Scene 4 ===
Beth stands at the bed with a suitcase on it and begins to fold clothes and put them in the suitcase. Brad stands wearing a "World's Greatest Dad" apron holding a spatula and a container of charcoal lighter fluid. Beth tells him that she is leaving and that she is not and has not been happy for a long time. Brad is worried about what their cookout party guests will think of him and sarcastically asks if Beth would be happy if he made a huge scene in front of them. Beth, in her anger, says that she really doesn't care. Brad reaches for her as she attempts to exit and Beth screams at him not to touch her.

Brad reveals that he knows that she and David have been sleeping together behind his back. Beth admits her infidelity. Brad decides to send their company home and exits. Beth is left crying to herself until Brad returns to let her know that Denny and Sonya are leaving. They took Brad and Beth's two children with them out for dinner so that the couple could talk everything out.

Brad asks Beth if David plans on leaving Cathy but Beth is not certain. Beth rises to leave saying that she will be staying at the cabin. Brad becomes more upset at the idea that Beth and David would be staying in the cabin that he built. Beth tries to convince Brad that she would be leaving with or without the promise that she and David would be together.

Curious, Brad asks if Cathy knows about the affair. Beth tells him that Cathy doesn't know and that she doesn't care. After Brad's anger grows of the wasted fifteen years of their marriage and Beth admitting that she wasn't happy through any of it, she leaves. Brad picks up the phone and bluntly tells Cathy of David and Beth's affair.

=== Scene 5 ===
Brad stands and recites a message to Beth. He apologises for their fight and hopes that she will take him back. Brad pleads with her to change her mind and wishes them to be lovers once again. He hopes that a few days at the cabin will change her mind.

=== Scene 6 ===
David and Cathy lay awake on the bed and speak to each other trying not to wake their sleeping children. David has asked Cathy to tell the children that they are separating but she refuses and notes how this situation will affect the children dramatically. Cathy climbs on top of and straddles David trying to initiate sex but he says that he can't. He believes that is her attempt to keep him to stay but she proposes that she is actually glad that he's leaving. She continues to try to arouse him with no success but she continues to try by rubbing up on and kissing him.

She begins asking David questions about he and Beth's relationship and divulges information about her meeting with Brad over coffee. Cathy becomes very direct, which is characteristic of her, and asks David to do his part to be intimate with her. They work together to get him inside of her and their physicality begins to accelerate as they continue their conversation. They both reach orgasm and Cathy collapses on top of David. After a moment of silence, David decides he will tell the children himself. Cathy becoming very sad resists his embrace and begins to cry. He wipes away her tears and they fall asleep together.

=== Scene 7 ===
Beth and Cathy meet in the gloom and rain. Cathy asks about the Meals on Wheels route that Beth is giving up because she will be taking it over. Beth says she does not want to do it or go to church anymore because she feels stupid when she prays now. Being a formally very faithful person, she has since felt those beliefs fall.

They discuss who will be keeping the children. Beth admits that Brad's lawyers are really good and it doesn't seem that she will get to keep her children. Cathy reveals she will also be keeping the children meaning that it will just be Beth and David when all is said and done. Cathy warns Beth that David loves babies but once they are no longer little or helpless, he becomes petty and blames them for everything. Beth, no longer comfortable, wishes to end the conversation. The two women part ways.

=== Scene 8 ===
Beth and David stand near the bed wearing light jackets discussing a house they are currently in and are considering buying. Beth wishes there were more bedrooms to accommodate all of their children from their previous marriages. They begin to go back and forth about how to make this house a home for their children, when Beth questions whether what they've done is worth all the suffering it has caused. David questions her about going back. She admits that she would never but that this process is really difficult. Beth reveals that she is pregnant with David's child. Though Beth resists him at first, David ultimately pulls her into a comforting embrace. Beth wipes away her tears as the realtor approaches from the other room.

=== Scene 9 ===
David recites a letter to his and Beth's daughter Lily. She is too little to read so he notes all her favorite things at this point in her life. He reveals that he is writing this letter because it is Christmas Eve and just as in Beth's dream they had gone shopping for ingredients to make Christmas cookies. Unlike in the dream, Lily was a good little girl and did not spill the orange flower water. He explains that, also unlike the dream, the day was tinged with sadness. He explains to Lily how many people were hurt by what he and Beth had done but that it was all worth it because of her. He wraps the letter around a bottle of orange flower water so that one day she may smell it and remember all the things that went into making a miracle like her. He finishes with "Whatever happens to you ever in this life, always remember we love you, Lily, and you are worth everything." END OF PLAY

== Productions ==
Orange Flower Water had its debut performances in July 2002 at The Contemporary American Theatre Festival and The Jungle Theatre. The production at The Contemporary American Theatre Festival in Shepherdston, West Virginia was directed by Leah C. Gardiner. The performance at the Jungle Theater in Minneapolis, Minnesota was directed by Bain Boehlke.

Orange Flower Water had its New York debut at the Theater for the New City on March 26, 2005 and ran until May 9, 2005. This production was produced by the Edge Theater Company.

== Awards and nominations ==
- 2011 Big Easy Award nominations

- Best Ensemble 2011 - The Elm Theatre
- Best Drama 2011 - The Elm Theatre
- Best Director of Drama 2011 - Mark Routhier - WON
- Best Actress in a Drama 2011 - Kerry Cahill
- Best Supporting Actress in a Drama 2011 - Veronica Russel
