= Take Shelter =

Psychological thriller film by Jeff Nichols

- Theatrical release poster
- Directed by: Jeff Nichols
- Written by: Jeff Nichols
- Produced by: Sophia Lin; Tyler Davidson
- Starring: Michael Shannon; Jessica Chastain; Shea Whigham; Katy Mixon; Kathy Baker
- Cinematography: Adam Stone
- Edited by: Parke Gregg
- Music by: David Wingo
- Production companies: Hydraulx Entertainment; Rei Capital; Grove Hill Productions; Strange Matter Films
- Distributed by: Sony Pictures Classics (North and Latin America, Australia and New Zealand); FilmNation Entertainment (International)
- Release dates: January 24, 2011 (Sundance); September 30, 2011 (United States)
- Running time: 121 minutes
- Country: United States
- Language: English
- Budget: $4.7 million
- Box office: $5 million

Take Shelter is a 2011 American independent psychological thriller film written and directed by Jeff Nichols and starring Michael Shannon and Jessica Chastain. The plot follows a young blue-collar husband and father (Shannon) in rural Ohio who is plagued by a series of apocalyptic visions, and questions whether to shelter his family from a coming storm, or from himself and his increasing worry over having paranoid schizophrenia.

The film won two Saturn Awards—Best Writing for Nichols, and Best Actor for Shannon—and was nominated for two more, Best Horror or Thriller Film, and Best Actress, for Chastain. It explores themes of masculinity, mental illness, and the lengths people go to protect the ones they love.

== Plot ==
In LaGrange, Ohio, drilling rig foreman Curtis LaForche has apocalyptic dreams and visual and auditory hallucinations of rain "like fresh motor oil," swarms of menacing black birds, and being harmed by people close to him. He hides all of this from his wife, Samantha, and their deaf daughter, Hannah. He instead channels his anxieties into a compulsive obsession to improve and enlarge a storm shelter in his backyard; however, his increasingly strange behavior – including a tendency to cut ties with anyone in his life that has harmed him only in his dreams – strains his relationship with his family, friends, employer, and the close-knit town. He also puts his job in jeopardy as he borrows construction equipment from the drilling and mining company for personal use to build-out his storm shelter with the aid of his friend and coworker Dewart.

To deal with his increased insomnia and apocalyptic visions, Curtis sees Kendra, a counselor at a free clinic, with whom he talks about his family's psychological history. His mother, Sarah, has paranoid schizophrenia that surfaced in her at about the same age that Curtis is now. He's worried that he may also have the disorder

In order to have the remodeled storm shelter completed, Curtis gets a home improvement loan he can't afford to start building the shelter – all without telling his wife. Samantha becomes angry when she discovers the project and has Curtis' older brother Kyle visit him out of concern. Curtis dismisses Kyle's worries and gives him the family dog to keep after he has a nightmare of it attacking him. After Curtis takes more than the prescribed dose of a sedative and has a seizure, Samantha calls an ambulance. He recovers, then finally explains the truth to her, including his dreams, with the most recent being of Dewart attacking him with a pickaxe on the job site.

Curtis is increasingly absent from work and requests to his boss Russell that Dewart be transferred to another crew, causing tension with him. He and Samantha make preparations for the cochlear implant surgery for Hannah in six weeks' time. Having been informed of the borrowed work equipment by Dewart, Russell fires him and gives him only two weeks' worth of medical insurance benefits, after placing Dewart on two weeks' unpaid administrative leave.

Curtis buys gas masks for his family and extends his previous employer's health insurance policy for a few extra weeks. After he finds out that his counselor Kendra has suddenly transferred to Louisiana and been replaced with a new one, he walks out. Tensions linger between Curtis and Samantha over the loss of his job at such a crucial time for their family. Samantha gets Curtis to see an actual psychiatrist in Columbus and demands that they attend a social function so she can restore some sense of normalcy to their strained, increasingly isolated life. At a Lions Club fish fry, a bitter Dewart, who has been spreading gossip that Curtis is crazy, is angrily provoked and punches him. Enraged, Curtis knocks Dewart to the floor, overturns a table, and unleashes a frightening verbal tirade upon everyone present. He prophetically shouts that a devastating storm is coming, insisting that none of them are prepared.

Later, a tornado warning sends him and his family into the shelter. After they awaken, Curtis reluctantly removes his gas mask, prompted by Samantha. They go to open the shelter doors, but he still hears a storm outside. His wife implores him, insisting that there's no storm and that he needs to open the door. After a tense standoff, Curtis throws open the doors into the blinding sun; a strong but bearable storm has passed, and neighbors are cleaning up broken tree limbs and other yard debris as power company trucks restore electricity along the street.

A psychiatrist advises the couple to go through with their planned, annual beach vacation but that Curtis will need to get admitted for psychiatric care in a facility away from his family upon their return. At Myrtle Beach, while Curtis is building sandcastles with Hannah, she signs the word "storm.” As Samantha exits their beach house, the thick, oily rain that Curtis spoke of begins to fall, staining her outstretched hand. Samantha looks up to a bigger version of the ominous storm clouds Curtis had seen, massing over the ocean; multiple waterspouts reach down to the ocean's surface, and the tide pulls back as a tsunami looms in the distance. Samantha and Curtis exchange glances as Samantha whispers "okay.”

== Cast ==
- Michael Shannon as Curtis LaForche
- Jessica Chastain as Samantha "Sam" LaForche
- Shea Whigham as Dewart
- Katy Mixon as Nat
- Ray McKinnon as Kyle LaForche
- Lisa Gay Hamilton as Kendra
- Robert Longstreet as Jim
- Kathy Baker as Sarah
- Tova Stewart as Hannah LaForche

== Production ==
Following his well-received release of his 2007 debut, Shotgun Stories, writer and director Jeff Nichols wanted to have his follow-up be more of an arthouse film hybrid-genre film, with the expectation of it being able to premiere at the Sundance Film Festival. He had written another Southern Gothic-style film, Mud, which his collaborator Michael Shannon suggested as his follow-up due to its low-budget nature. However, Nichols stated that the Mud was a bigger film in his mind, and did not want it to be his second film.

Nichols began writing his screenplay for Take Shelter in 2008, drawing influences of anxieties from the then on-going financial crisis in the United States, the effects of the September 11 attacks and Hurricane Katrina, the mental health of working-class America, masculinity, and Nichols' own marriage to his wife, Missy.

In the summer of 2009, producer Tyler Davidson was sent the script of Take Shelter by Jeff Nichols' agent, who was a friend of Davidson. Drawn to the subject matter, Davidson reached out to Nichols to make the film, with shooting to take place in Davidson's native state of Ohio rather than Nichols' home state of Arkansas, where Shotgun Stories was set and shot in.

Filming took place on location during a 24-day shooting period in and around the cities of Elyria, Grafton, LaGrange, and Chardon in rural Northeast Ohio during the summer of 2010.

== Release ==
Take Shelter premiered in January 2011 at the Sundance Film Festival, and Sony Pictures Classics acquired rights to distribute the film in North America, Latin America, Australia, and New Zealand. The film also screened in May 2011 at the Cannes Film Festival, where it won the 50th Critics' Week Grand Prix. It also received the Fipresci award from the International Federation of Film Critics, sharing it with Le Havre and The Minister. In September 2011, Take Shelter was shown at the 37th Deauville American Film Festival, where it beat 13 other contenders to win the festival's grand prize. Later in September, Take Shelter was shown at the 2011 Toronto International Film Festival and at the 7th Zurich Film Festival, where it was named Best International Feature Film.

The film had a limited release in New York and Los Angeles on September 30, 2011.

== Reception ==
=== Critical response ===
On the review aggregator website Rotten Tomatoes, 92% of 168 critics' reviews are positive, with an average rating of 8.1/10. The website's consensus reads: "Michael Shannon gives a powerhouse performance and the purposefully subtle filmmaking creates a perfect blend of drama, terror, and dread." Metacritic, which uses a weighted average, assigned the film a score of 85 out of 100, based on 34 critics, indicating "universal acclaim".

Roger Ebert of the Chicago Sun-Times gave the film four out of four stars and praised Shannon's performance, writing, "It is the gift of actor Michael Shannon as Curtis LaForche that while appearing to be a stable husband and father with a good job in construction, he also can evoke by his eyes and manner a deep unease." He also wrote, "Here is a frightening thriller based not on special effects gimmicks but on a dread that seems quietly spreading in the land: that the good days are ending, and climate changes or other sinister forces will sweep away our safety."

=== Analysis ===
Since the release of Take Shelter, viewers have discussed the meaning of the film's ambiguous ending. In an interview with Creative Screenwriting five years after the release of the film, Nichols reflected, "I had a very strict idea of what the end of Take Shelter was. I know exactly what happens, and it’s fascinating to see people respond to it in their own ways. The beautiful part of storytelling is that you’re not just telling people a story, they’re also telling you something about themselves too through their reactions. In that situation you’re in a conversation with your audience. I really can’t think of a more rewarding or fulfilling result for something you’ve written. It’s active, kinetic, and really humbling."

In a video interview with Chase Whale in September 2012, Nichols elaborated on the ending, saying "For me personally...the moment that matters, dream, not dream, real, not real, whatever it is...is these two characters looking at each other and connecting. The fact that they're both seeing it, that's what matters, because if this is a film that is a meditation on marriage and commitment and communication then what the ending has to be is that these people are on the same page again. They had this wedge put in between them from all of these various factors, and now at the end they're looking at each other, and they are seeing each other, and they're together, and the circumstances that surround that, please, open to interpretation."

== See also ==
- List of films featuring the deaf and hard of hearing
