= Coyote on a Fence =

Play written by Bruce Graham

Coyote on a Fence is a play written by Bruce Graham. It was first produced at the Cincinnati Playhouse in the Park in their thirty-eighth season (1997–98).

The play stars John Brennan, a death row convict who kicked in the face of a drug dealer named Dwayne Rigby prior to the start of the play. John, an articulate person who writes for the Death Row Advocate, meets Robert Alvin "Bobby" Reyburn, an uneducated hick carrying a death sentence for burning a church filled with African-American worshippers. The play explores the concept of the death penalty and the meaning of evil.

The play takes place in a prison in the southern United States.

== Characters ==
- John Brennan – A white, middle-aged and fairly well-educated prisoner who feels a sense of denial about his crime.
- Robert Alvin "Bobby" Reyburn – A white, developmentally challenged prisoner in his late twenties.
- Shawna DuChamps – The female prison guard who feels guilt over the deaths of the prisoners. Shawna's race may be determined by the individual production.
- Samuel "Sam" Fried – A Jewish white writer for The New York Times who interviews John.
