= Edward Albee's At Home at the Zoo =

Play written by Edward Albee

At Home at the Zoo
- Written by: Edward Albee
- Original language: English

Premiere
- Place premiered: Hartford Stage

Edward Albee's At Home at the Zoo (formerly titled Peter & Jerry) is a play by Edward Albee which adds a first act to his 1959 play The Zoo Story. This first act, also called Homelife, revolves around the marriage of Peter and Ann and ends with Peter leaving to go read a book in Central Park.

== Background ==
The Hartford Stage commissioned Homelife, which Albee had been considering "as a way to compensate for what he perceived as lapses in Zoo Story." Albee "said in recent interviews that he felt that Peter needed to be explored in more depth than he had been in Zoo Story. So he wrote a prequel, Homelife, which together with Zoo Story make up Hartford Stage's new offering, Peter and Jerry,"

== Productions ==
The play had its world premiere at the Hartford Stage Company, Connecticut in June 2004. The play was directed by Pam MacKinnon, with the cast of Frank Wood (Peter), Frederick Weller (Jerry), and Johanna Day (Ann).

The play opened Off Broadway at the Second Stage Theatre on November 11, 2007, and closed on December 30, 2007. The play opened under the title Peter and Jerry and consisted of two one-act plays, The Zoo Story and Homelife. Directed by Pam MacKinnon, the cast featured Johanna Day, Bill Pullman (Peter), and Dallas Roberts (Jerry). The play received 2008 Drama Desk Award nominations for Outstanding Actor in a Play, Bill Pullman and Outstanding Featured Actress in a Play, Johanna Day.

At a 2009 production of the play in Philadelphia it was retitled Edward Albee's At Home at the Zoo.

The play was produced at the American Conservatory Theater (ACT) in San Francisco, from June 5, 2009, to July 5, 2009, under the title At Home at the Zoo. The play was directed by Rebecca Bayla Taichman, with Anthony Fusco (Peter), Manoel Felciano (Jerry) and René Augesen (Ann).

The play was produced at the Arena Stage, Washington, D.C. during their "Edward Albee Festival". The play ran in March and April 2011, directed by Mary B. Robinson. At Home at the Zoo had its Pittsburgh-area premiere as the inaugural show of the Ghostlight Theatre Troupe in Gibsonia, Pennsylvania in July 2010. It starred Rich Kenzie as Peter, Mary Romeo as Ann and Ned Johnstone as Jerry and was directed by Gabe Herlinger.[13]

== Critical response ==
Ben Brantley, in his review of the 2007 Off-Broadway production for The New York Times wrote: "What makes Peter and Jerry such an essential and heartening experience... is the chance it affords to compare the dramatist of then and now. Mr. Albee is, among other things, a chronicler of life as erosion. Yet in seeing these works side by side you discover that growing older does not have to mean creative atrophy. The Zoo Story is infused with a young man’s frustration and hormonal energy, while Homelife is the product of an older, more contemplative mind."
