= Loving (soundtrack) =

Loving (Original Motion Picture Soundtrack)

Soundtrack album by David Wingo
- Released: November 4, 2016
- Recorded: 2016
- Studio: 12th Street Sound
- Genre: Soundtrack
- Length: 37:37
- Label: Back Lot Music B01LZK5FIR
- Producer: David Wingo

David Wingo chronology
Midnight Special (2016)	Loving (2016)	Brigsby Bear (2017)

Loving (Original Motion Picture Soundtrack) is the soundtrack album for the 2016 film of the same name directed by Jeff Nichols, taking inspiration from Nancy Buirski's documentary The Loving Story (2011). The film documents the life of Richard and Mildred Loving, the plaintiffs in the 1967 U.S. Supreme Court (the Warren Court) decision Loving v. Virginia, which invalidated state laws prohibiting interracial marriage, and stars Ruth Negga and Joel Edgerton as Mildred and Richard Loving. The film was produced by Big Beach and Raindog Films, and distributed worldwide by Focus Features.

The original score is composed by David Wingo, who worked with Nichols previously on Take Shelter (2011), Mud (2012), and Midnight Special (2016). The soundtrack album featured 20 tracks, including an original song – the title track – performed by Ben Nichols, Jeff's brother, and lead guitarist at the American rock band Lucero, which was released as a single on October 29, 2016. The soundtrack was released digitally on November 4, 2016, by Universal Pictures' primary record label Back Lot Music, while the physical versions were distributed on November 11.

The soundtrack received acclaim from critics, saying Wingo's score "complimented several emotions with Richard and Midred's relationship". Wingo received appreciation from industry critics and insiders for his work in the film, and the score was shortlisted for several nominations in the Original Score category, including the Academy Awards but could not get selected.

== Composition ==
Wingo wanted the original music for the film to feel "like it could have been from any time" referring to the 1950s setting, while Jeff Nichols wished for the score of Loving to be orchestral, classical, while not contemporary sounding. Wingo stated that Ennio Morricone's compositions for Days of Heaven (1978), The Battle of Algiers (1966), and The Mission influenced the score of Loving, albeit Wingo didn't listen to them prior to scoring. Speaking in an interview to Flood Magazine, Wingo stated about his collaborations with Nichols and David Gordon Green claiming that "they play such a big role that sometimes feel like they should get a writing credit. They're both extremely musically minded. The music would not be what it is without their involvement." While, on the flip side, he, Nichols, Green does not have any experience on music, so "there is definitely a sort of chasm that needs to be bridged". Hence he approached the film's music in the way, what Nichols and Green do, thinking in terms of emotions and moods and colors, in an impressionistic sort of way, and develop their own vocabulary".

Using a minimalist approach, when he could, Wingo mostly wished to reflect Richard and Mildred's emotional and psychological stakes. For the relationship between Richard and Mildred, which has a sense of melancholy, a hope between something they loved and lost, he mostly used traditional and classical music, making use of strings, brass and piano. At some sequences, for creating tension and anxiety, Wingo made devoid of using orchestral elements which was "sample-based and sound designing and a lot of drones, scrapes and just a foreign feeling of feeling just so not of that world, not of their world, and that was the intention was just [incorporating] things that just feels so foreign – just that sense of displacement in the music."

Wingo felt that Loving shouldn't have any big, sweeping themes because both Richard and Mildred were very shy, reserved people but having such a grace and beauty about them. He spoke of Nichols wanting him to watch Nancy Buirski's The Loving Story (2011), as Nichols wanted the movie to feel the same way. Wingo later spoke of [Nichols] wishing to capture what they felt facing this horrible persecution, which results in the music being simple and restrained, albeit with a real beauty to it. Wingo chose the distinctive Americana-type score to establish the musical voice of the film, and managed to gather a 14-piece string ensemble of local musicians at 12th Street Sound for the recording of the soundtrack.

In regards to scoring Loving, Wingo remarked that the score for Loving needed to be "elemental and simple to a certain degree while avoiding any sentimentality to capture the grace and beauty of Richard and Mildred." He stated that all of his scores for [Nichols] in the past have had elements of an orchestral background, however, he knew that the main themes for Loving needed to contain a traditional orchestral score without any modern elements. He concluded by stating of Nichols that, "The other main thing that [Nichols] needed the score to accomplish was to really reflect the always-present anxiety and tension that they were living with all these years. Those pieces don't just operate in a different way than the other themes but are completely different instrumentation as well, with hardly any orchestral elements."

== Critical reception ==
The score received critical acclaim, with critics assigning that Wingo's compositions "suits with the film's theme perfectly". In the review for Vanity Fair, writer Richard Lawson had said that Wingo's music is "maybe the most conventionally dramatic" and "Oscar baiting". Daily Collegian-based Lauren LaMagna compared Wingo and Nichols' collaboration as "the two blend together just as beautifully as James Cameron and James Horner or Steven Spielberg and John Williams. Wingo knows exactly how to advance the story through his music. He allows us to understand how the Lovings are feeling and what they're thinking. This is especially laudable since both Mildred and Richard are introverted and meek." The Hollywood Reporter's Todd McCarthy, called Wingo as "one of the winning key contributors of the timely drama, in Nichols' technicalities for loving".

Vulture's David Edelstein reviewed that: "Nichols uses David Wingo's score sparingly, for longing or portent. Often he just uses birds or insects or car engines. A couple of moments have a Hitchcock frisson: Richard's point-of-view when a car — maybe the police, maybe some vigilante — passes by, its taillights receding in the driver's mirror. I can imagine a Hollywood executive reading his script and saying, “Can we punch this up with a cross burning? Or a scene where Richard gets into a fight with some rednecks?” But Nichols embellishes nothing. With minimal means, he makes the air thick with dread." D. H. Schleicher said Wingo's "score matches the mood of the scenes to a perfect degree", while a critic based at CW 69 Atlanta said the score "enhances the beautiful moments between Richard and Mildred where the dialogues are sparse". Another reviewer from Broadcast Music, Inc. wrote "Wingo's music for the triumphant film is no less compelling than the story. It's the perfect blend of sound for the wide-range of emotions felt during the spellbinding portrayal of the couples' civil rights case, Loving v. Virginia".

== Track listing ==
Loving (Original Motion Picture Soundtrack)
No.	Title	Length
1.	"Proposal"	1:16
2.	"Arrest"	3:07
3.	"Sheriff"	2:11
4.	"Time Passing"	2:06
5.	"Leaving Jail"	1:26
6.	"Leaving Home"	1:22
7.	"D.C."	2:10
8.	"Hand Off"	3:10
9.	"Call the Lawyer"	3:09
10.	"The Letter"	1:05
11.	"Phone Call"	1:02
12.	"Bernard Cohen"	1:31
13.	"Baseball Game"	1:15
14.	"Leaving D.C."	2:30
15.	"Farmhouse"	1:55
16.	"Bernie and Phil"	0:51
17.	"Brick"	2:15
18.	"The Decision"	2:05
19.	"Home"	2:56
20.	"Loving" (performed by Ben Nichols)	2:54

== Charts ==
Chart (2016)	Peak position
UK Soundtrack Albums (OCC)	49
US Billboard 200	188
US Soundtrack Albums (Billboard)	47

== Additional music ==
Songs that are not featured in soundtrack, but played throughout the film, include:

- "Ooh, My Head" by Ritchie Valens
- The track based on the titular folklore character John Henry
- "Feel So Good" by Sonny Terry and Brownie McGhee
- "My Baby, My Baby" by the Empires
- "For Your Precious Love" by Jerry Butler
- "Is Everything Alright" by Earl King
- "You Don't Miss Your Water" by William Bell and Mavis Staples
- "My Love Will Never Die" by Magic Sam
- "Homemade Pickles" by Earle H. Hagen
- "Don't Be a Fool" by Clarence Reid

== Personnel ==
Credits adapted from AllMusic

Production

- Music production director – Jake Voulgarides
- Executive in-Charge – Mike Knobloch
- Management (Music Business Affairs) – Brian Porizek, Kyle Staggs
- Legal advisor (Music Business Affairs) – Beth Lemberger
- Package Design – Brian Porizek
- Marketing – Nikki Walsh

Technical personnel

- Score composer – David Wingo
- Score producer – David Wingo, Jesus Gerdel
- Music supervisor – Lauren Mikus
- Music editor – Jay Richardson
- Orchestrator and conductor – Jay Weigel
- Audio engineer – Charlie Kramsky
- Mixing – Colleen Lutz, Satoshi Noguchi
- Mastering – Patricia Sullivan

Instrumentalists

- Viola – Ames Asbell, Leah Nelson, Sara Driver, Shawn Somerville
- Violin – Alexis Buffum, Beth Blackerby, Elise Winters-Huete, Helen Cooper, Leigh Mahoney, Paul Robertson
- Cello – Frank Jenkins, Margaret Coltman-Smith, Sara Nelson, Tony Rogers
