= Bernard S. Cohen =

American civil liberties attorney and politician (1934–2020)

Member of the Virginia House of Delegates
- In office January 9, 1980 – January 10, 1996
- Preceded by: Richard R. G. Hobson
- Succeeded by: Brian Moran
- Constituency: 21st district (1980‍–‍1983); 46th district (1983‍–‍1996)

Personal details
- Born: January 17, 1934 Brooklyn, New York, U.S.
- Died: October 12, 2020 (aged 86) Fredericksburg, Virginia, U.S.
- Party: Democratic
- Spouse: Rae Rose Cohen
- Children: 2
- Education: City College of New York; Georgetown University
- Occupation: Lawyer; politician

Bernard S. Cohen (January 17, 1934 – October 12, 2020) was a civil liberties attorney and Democratic member of the Virginia House of Delegates. On April 10, 1967, appearing with co-counsel Philip Hirschkop on behalf of the ACLU, Cohen presented oral argument for the petitioners in Loving v. Virginia before the U. S. Supreme Court. On June 12, 1967, the Supreme Court ruled in favor of Cohen's clients, declaring bans on interracial marriage unconstitutional, thus invalidating the anti-miscegenation laws of 15 states.

== Early life and career ==
Cohen was born in Brooklyn, New York, the son of an immigrant Jewish fur worker who was active in a local union. In an interview, Cohen associated his father's union activities with his own respect for working people and his status as a historically oppressed minority as an impetus for furthering equal rights. He attended City College of New York, and law school at Georgetown University. In the 1960s he helped found the Virginia affiliate of the American Civil Liberties Union. Cohen died at age 86 on October 12, 2020.

=== Loving vs. Virginia ===
On April 10, 1967, only a few years out of law school, Cohen argued as a volunteer cooperating attorney for the ACLU on behalf of the petitioners Richard and Mildred Loving in the case of Loving v. Virginia before the Supreme Court of the United States. Cohen's co-counsel was fellow Virginian Philip Hirschkop, who had also recently completed law school at Georgetown.

Richard Loving was a white construction worker, and Mildred was of both black and native American origins according to her attorneys, though in 2004 she claimed Native American-Rappahannock and not African ethnic origins. The Lovings were married in Washington, D.C., in 1958. Upon returning to their home in Caroline County, Virginia, six weeks after their marriage, they were arrested and charged with violating Virginia's anti-miscegenation law, a felony carrying a potential penalty of between one and five years' imprisonment. At the time of the Lovings' wedding, twenty-four states banned interracial marriage. The couple were sentenced to one year in prison, with the sentences suspended on condition that they leave the state for 25 years. At one point, according to attorney Hirschkop, Mildred, though five months pregnant and the mother of a young child, was held in a small dirty jail cell for the better part of a month. After the passage of the Civil Rights Act of 1964, Mildred wrote U.S Attorney General Robert F. Kennedy, inquiring whether the new federal law would allow her and her husband to live in Virginia again. Kennedy forwarded the letter to the ACLU office in Washington.

==== Supreme Court ruling in Loving vs. Virginia ====
U.S states, by the date of repeal of anti-miscegenation laws: No laws passed 1780 to 1887 1948 to 1967 After 1967

On June 12, 1967, the Supreme Court rendered its unanimous decision overturning a Virginia Supreme Court ruling that affirmed the couple's convictions for violating Virginia's Racial Integrity Act of 1924, which had outlawed interracial marriage. The opinion declared that bans on interracial marriage were unconstitutional, depriving both partners of equal protection under the law, as guaranteed by the U.S. Constitution's Fourteenth Amendment. The decision rejected the authority of any state to create a law limiting the right to marry on the basis of race, or to enforce such laws where they existed.

The Supreme Court ruling effectively voided existing interracial marriage laws in 15 mostly Southern states, including all the states of the former Confederacy. A few states, notably Alabama, nevertheless failed to repeal their anti-miscegenation laws, though they could no longer be enforced. Alabama did not officially repeal its ban on interracial marriage until 2000, when the voters in a special election struck an anti-miscegenation clause from the state constitution. After the Loving ruling, Alabama continued to enforce its interracial marriage laws until 1970.

Richard Loving died aged 41 in 1975 in Caroline County, Virginia, killed by a drunk driver. Mildred Loving died of pneumonia on May 2, 2008, in Milford, Virginia, aged 68.

== Work as a representative to the Virginia House of Delegates ==
From 1980 to 1996, Cohen served as a representative to the Virginia House of Delegates.

=== Work with the Virginia House of Delegates 21st district ===
As a freshman delegate in 1980, Cohen sponsored a controversial measure to decriminalize homosexuality in Virginia, a traditionally conservative state. Not surprisingly, the bill failed.

=== Work with the Virginia House of Delegates 56th district ===
From January 12, 1983, to January 10, 1996, Cohen served as a representative of the 56th district of the Virginia House of Delegates. The 56th district consisted largely of the city of Alexandria, not far from the nation's capital. Many of Cohen's bills sought to enhance the rights of criminal defendants or of plaintiffs in legal proceedings. For example, many of his bills were designed to benefit people who filed personal injury cases in Virginia courts.

==== Nuclear freeze and death with dignity resolutions ====
In early 1983, Cohen backed a nuclear freeze resolution before the Virginia State Senate Rules Committee, which ultimately was voted down 10–4 on February 8. Cohen's resolution decried the "huge sums of money being spent testing, producing, and deploying nuclear warheads and weapons" and the strain it placed on the rest of the federal budget. It further called for bi-lateral talks between the U.S. and the Soviet Union to halt the further production of such weapons. A chief critic of the bill was Bernard F. Halloran, a special assistant to the U.S. Arms Control and Disarmament Agency.

In early 1983, the Virginia House passed Cohen's "Death with Dignity" bill. The measure allowed terminally ill patients to determine whether they wanted to go through "heroic artificial means to keep their bodies alive when there was no hope of recovery". On February 21, 1983, the Virginia Senate passed the "Natural Death Act", which relieved physicians of criminal and civil liability once they, with the consent of the terminally ill patient or that person's family, disconnected medical devices designed to keep the patient alive. The bill required that the patient be in terminal condition, and that there must be "no reasonable expectation of recovery". Doctors who felt they could not morally comply with the wishes of the terminally ill patient or family member to disconnect the patient's regulator could transfer the care of the patient to another doctor.

==== Other notable stances ====
In February 1984, Cohen strongly opposed a bill that prevented young men who had not registered with the Selective Service System from attending state colleges and receiving financial aid. The bill passed the Virginia House with a vote of 67–33, but had yet to be brought before the Virginia Senate.

Cohen co-authored a blog entry in 2007 for the Huffington Post invoking his experience in Loving v. Virginia to support the legalization of same sex marriage.

== Portrayal in television and movies ==
Cohen has been portrayed as a character in multiple dramatizations of the Loving case. In the 1996 TV movie Mr. & Mrs. Loving, he was played by Corey Parker. In the 2016 film Loving, he is played by Nick Kroll.
