= Loving (2016 film) =

2016 film by Jeff Nichols

- Theatrical release poster
- Directed by: Jeff Nichols
- Written by: Jeff Nichols
- Based on: The Loving Story by Nancy Buirski
- Produced by: Ged Doherty; Colin Firth; Nancy Buirski; Sarah Green; Marc Turtletaub; Peter Saraf
- Starring: Joel Edgerton; Ruth Negga; Marton Csokas; Nick Kroll; Michael Shannon
- Cinematography: Adam Stone
- Edited by: Julie Monroe
- Music by: David Wingo
- Production companies: Big Beach; Raindog Films
- Distributed by: Focus Features (United States and United Kingdom); Universal Pictures (United Kingdom)
- Release dates: May 16, 2016 (Cannes Film Festival); November 4, 2016 (United States); February 3, 2017 (United Kingdom)
- Running time: 123 minutes
- Countries: United Kingdom; United States
- Language: English
- Budget: $9 million
- Box office: $12.9 million

Loving is a 2016 biographical romantic drama film written and directed by Jeff Nichols about Richard and Mildred Loving, the plaintiffs in the 1967 US case (the Warren Court) decision Loving v. Virginia, which invalidated state laws prohibiting interracial marriage. It is inspired by the 2011 documentary The Loving Story by Nancy Buirski. Ruth Negga and Joel Edgerton co-star as Mildred and Richard Loving with Marton Csokas, Nick Kroll, and Michael Shannon.

The film had a limited release in the United States on November 4, 2016, before a wide release on November 11, 2016. The film received positive reviews, with praise for its acting, Nichols' directing and writing, the film's faithfulness, and was named one of the best films of 2016 by several media outlets. The film was selected to compete for the Palme d'Or at the 2016 Cannes Film Festival, and was nominated for numerous awards, including a Golden Globe nomination for Best Actor for Edgerton and Academy Award and Golden Globe nominations for Negga.

== Plot ==
Richard Loving, a white construction worker in Caroline County, Virginia, falls in love with a local black woman and family friend, Mildred Jeter. Upon Mildred discovering that she is pregnant, they decide to marry. Knowing that interracial marriage violates Virginia's anti-miscegenation laws, they drive to Washington, D.C., to get married in 1958. Richard makes plans to build a house for Mildred less than a mile from her family home.

Soon afterward, sheriff's deputies raid Mildred's home and arrest the Lovings. When Richard points to the marriage license, Sheriff Brooks curtly tells him that it has no validity in Virginia and hauls them both to jail. They plead guilty to breaking the anti-miscegenation law and are sentenced to one year in prison. However, the judge suspends the sentence, provided that they do not return to Virginia together for at least 25 years. The Lovings move to Washington to stay with a friend of Mildred. They briefly return to Caroline County so their first child, Sidney, can be delivered by Richard's mother, a midwife. Arrested again, they are cleared when their lawyer informs the judge he erroneously advised them to return.

Mildred and Richard have two other children together, Donald and Peggy. However, Mildred grows frustrated by being away from the country, and her frustration grows when she watches the March on Washington. She writes to Attorney General Robert F. Kennedy for help. Kennedy refers them to the American Civil Liberties Union. Lawyer Bernard S. Cohen takes the case and confers with constitutional law expert Phil Hirschkop. They conclude that the Lovings' ordeal has a good chance of going all the way to the Supreme Court – and overturning similar anti-miscegenation laws across the nation.

After a minor auto accident involving one of their children, the Lovings decide to slip back into Virginia, settling in a remote portion of King and Queen County, while their case moves through the courts. Their case gains wide attention, and is profiled in Life magazine by photographer Grey Villet. The state contends that people of different races were never intended to live together, and goes as far as to suggest the Lovings' children are bastards. The state Supreme Court refuses to set aside the Lovings' conviction. Undeterred, Cohen and Hirschkop appeal to the federal Supreme Court. Before going to Washington, Cohen asks Richard if he has a message for the justices. Richard replies, "Tell the judge I love my wife."

Several weeks later, the Supreme Court unanimously holds that laws prohibiting interracial marriage are unconstitutional. The Lovings return to Caroline County and resume construction on their dream house. An epilogue reveals Richard died in a car accident seven years later; Mildred never remarried and continued living in the house Richard built for her until her death in 2008.

== Cast ==
- Joel Edgerton as Richard Loving: a taciturn, white Virginian bricklayer, and the husband of Mildred. On the character of Richard, Nichols stated, "[Richard] speaks in a clipped manner, then it's the way he holds his head in front of the rest of the body, how self-conscious he seemed in front of the camera. He'd laugh and quickly cover his lips over his [tobacco-stained] teeth. He's a bricklayer ... they're hunched over all day long, and they turn their bodies into these assembly lines for laying brick. What I gave [Edgerton], in terms of coherent character on the page, he added specificity." When describing Richard, Edgerton stated that he "... was a quiet hero, and sometimes quiet dignity speaks louder than the typical movie hero who's all too eager to fight." He spoke of some of the challenges in portraying Richard, such as the Virginian accent, in which he stated, "The importance of the story itself, not to treat it with kid gloves but to maintain a reverence for the truth, for the responsibility we felt toward these real people. And conveying so much with so few words was one of the biggest challenges." To capture the physical quality of Richard, Edgerton bleached his hair, adopted a receding hairline, and wore prosthetic teeth. He spoke of the influences in Errol Morris' The Thin Blue Line (1988), recommended by Nichols, which assisted in his finding of Richard's accent. He was drawn to Nichols' version of the character, as according to him he was: "just shut down and emasculated and weathered by this situation" while Edgerton noted the version was keeping more in line with the man in Buirski's The Loving Story (2011). Both Nichols and Edgerton felt the main challenge of bringing Richard to the screen was the question of where he fell on the intellectual spectrum, as Richard was not well educated nor naturally gifted, and may not have understood the case's complexities or its social ramifications, with both actor and director holding conversations on the subject. Edgerton spoke of Richard, the difficulty in holding an accent with a taciturn approach, while referring to roles of the past: "With a character like John Connolly of Black Mass (2015), you really get to fly on the rhythm of an accent, and the rhythm is so much a part of what an accent is. When you don't have much to say, it's hard to latch onto that cadence." Edgerton also involved himself in bricklaying to prepare for the role, and while speaking of his experience he remarked that he began to fully understand Richard's posture: "Suddenly it made sense because of the mechanics of his work ... Here was a man who looked awkward in his own body because he was so used to conserving energy. A man who slumped because he spent his days hunched over a pile of bricks." In an interview with People, Edgerton spoke of Richard and Mildred's daughter Peggy: "Peggy is as shy as her father and we were really just hoping for her acceptance and her blessing, which I think we got. One day on set she called me 'Daddy' and it was like the greatest blessing I've ever had."
- Ruth Negga as Mildred Loving: a sweet, soft-spoken young woman of black and Native American ancestry, whose marriage to Richard violated the state's anti-miscegenation law. During 2013, while preparing for Midnight Special, casting director Francine Maisler suggested Negga to Jeff Nichols and Sarah Green. Negga was the first person director Nichols auditioned for the role and he revealed that he thought she was too petite when he first met her, but her acting abilities changed his mind, wherein he stated, "She spoke in Mildred's voice. She held her mouth like Mildred ... I wasn't looking for star power. I was looking for great actors." After she successfully auditioned for the role of Mildred, Nichols sent Negga excerpts of his yet-to-be-finished screenplay and a copy of Nancy Buirski's The Loving Story (2011). Of Negga's audition, Nichols stated, "Ruth had the voice, she had the posture, the facial expressions. It wasn't until after we were done and I started to speak with her that I realized she had an Irish accent ... She was Mildred. When she left the room I turned to [Green] and [Maisler] and said, 'Well, do we really have to see anyone else?'" On what attracted her to Nichols' film, and the part of Mildred, Negga stated, "I've never seen that kind of story told in this manner before. You know, the screenplay is so beautiful and I wanted very much to be part of that. Having become familiar with them, I think their story needs to be told and shared and honored and celebrated." On the character of Mildred, Negga stated, "Mildred was the spine of the couple. She saw what maybe Richard didn't want to see, that they weren't going to get out of this by running away or putting their heads in the sand. She was a very astute woman. After those five days in jail, she realized that the fairy tale was over." Negga spoke of the personal connection she felt to the Lovings' story, because of her own background as a mixed-race person. Nichols invited Negga and Edgerton to Virginia for two weeks to visit the various locations, do prep work, and visit special places related to Richard and Mildred, two weeks prior to post-production. Negga deeply identified with Mildred's sense of connection to a place, with her drawing comparisons to Limerick, Ireland and Richmond, Virginia, by her stating that: "Virginia isn't that different from Ireland ... Land and home and community are super important. When I was playing her, I tried to imagine I couldn't go home again because of whom I married. It must have drained the lifeblood from her." On the unassuming couple, Negga stated, "They were poor, relatively uneducated. Mildred was a bit more educated than he was, but I think everyone else underestimated their tenacity, their belief in themselves, their love for each other, and their respect for each other." In an interview with The Boston Globe, Negga spoke of having "already been gifted, personally" by playing Mildred and getting to know her surviving family, to which she later remarked, "She's my hero. But what's important is that people are coming out of this movie genuinely moved because what they see is kindness. In many ways, [Mildred] would have been uncomfortable [by the attention] but their legacy is important ... I think schoolchildren will know their names."
- Marton Csokas as Sheriff Brooks: A powerful local figure whom everybody in Caroline County knew and feared. One of the more difficult roles to cast was that of Sheriff Garnett R. Brooks, with Nichols himself not seeing Brooks as the bad guy of the story or even as a nemesis to the couple, noting that the lawman's beliefs about race and marriage were commonplace. Nichols explains: "I see Sheriff Brooks as being part of the equation ... Having grown up in Arkansas, I have family members that are racists. It's not something I'm proud of, but I understand how these attitudes are perpetuated, and that everyone sets, or has set, their own point of view." He explains the beliefs of Brooks, in which he expands, "Brooks was quoted as saying 'a robin's a robin, a sparrow is a sparrow,' and he believed that. It was important that Brooks not be played as the slack-jacked and mean Southern sheriff stereotype." Joel Edgerton suggested Marton Csokas for the role of Brooks. After meeting Csokas, Nichols was intrigued by his perspective on the part. He remembers, "Marton saw Sheriff Brooks as seeing himself as an adult dealing with wayward children. They were born and raised in a part of the South that didn't necessarily see the lines between color, and his stance was, God put those lines there." For the role of Sheriff Brooks, Csokas pored over published records and spoke to family members, to which he remarked, "From the home perspective, here was a husband and father who was a hardworking, loyal, strict human being who loved his family and animals, and was a stickler for the law. The statements Sheriff Brooks makes are indicative of the status quo and what people believed. That was the law at the time. So he was doing his job to the nth degree, which is important to quantify." In an interview with Entertainment Weekly, Colin Firth spoke of the daughter of Sheriff Garnett Brooks, Betty Cwiklinski, offering her services while post-production took place, in the form of her father's old uniform, but it couldn't be used as it didn't fit Csokas. Firth stated that Cwiklinski said, "He was like that, he did say that stuff." He concluded by mentioning her thoughts on her father: "She thought he was misguided but he was still a human being. And she made that stipulation. There's a real sense even among the locals to want to address that side of their history."
- Nick Kroll as Bernie Cohen: A young ACLU volunteer attorney who represents Richard and Mildred Loving. In 2014, while watching television in New Orleans during the filming of Midnight Special, Nichols was struck by the realization that Nick Kroll looked remarkably like Bernie Cohen, to which Nichols noted, "I went online and watched more of [Kroll], and began to envision him as a good fit for Bernie." Nichols furthered his remark on his inspired choice of Kroll, "... Then you find out Jules Kroll went to Georgetown Law just like Bernie Cohen did. I don't know. It just started to make sense. He came to Austin to see me and talk about the part. Honestly, I just thought it was an inspired choice." On the quality of Cohen, Nichols stated, "Bernie had this quality of performance ... It was like he was performing, but I also felt like it could happen in the scene where he first meets Richard and Mildred. There are no cameras in the room, but he is putting on a performance to persuade them that he is the right lawyer for their case, even if he isn't entirely sure of that himself. At the end of the scene, you see him sort of break character." Kroll was not only familiar with the Lovings' story but also with Nichols' work, with him stating, "I'd seen Take Shelter and Mud, and thought they were phenomenal movies. They are quite different from one another and yet you can still feel the larger hand at work; [Nichols] has a very special touch that he brings to his films. It was exciting to get the call that I was being considered for LOVING, because of this filmmaker and this subject." On taking the role of Cohen, Kroll began to remark, "The story of Richard and Mildred Loving is such a beautiful, important story about two people who love each other and that want to be together and were brave enough to go through the legal system to make that happen for themselves and in the end for millions of people ... So, in that regard, it seemed like something it would be an honour to be a part of." Kroll highlighted his own numerous ties to the Loving case: "Weirdly, my father went to Georgetown Law school almost exactly when Bernie was going there ... And my dad actually worked for Robert F. Kennedy while he was in school: he worked at RFK's office and then actually ran his campaign in Queens when he was running for president. And I went to Georgetown. So I had a number of weird connections to the whole thing, including the fact that I've played a defense lawyer before, a very different kind of defense lawyer, in that Rodney Ruxin represented the worst people in the world." In an interview with The Hollywood Reporter, Kroll spoke of the presidential election, while stating, "I think a lot of people see hope in [Richard and Mildred Loving's story]. They see the power of the individual and their ability to make change in the country outside of the system."
- Michael Shannon as Grey Villet: A freelance photographer who is commissioned by LIFE Magazine to create a photo essay on the Lovings. Nichols sent Shannon the script, although the two hadn't spoken about what role he was potentially going to play. Nichols also mentioned that he didn't envision Shannon as portraying Richard Loving, to which he states, "... When I found these photos of this Life photographer, he was a tall guy–like six foot four– and he kind of looked like Mike. And as you'll see when you see the film, he's kind of gregarious. And I'd seen Mike in this one man play called Mistakes Were Made ... And he was kind of gregarious in this play, and it's a side of him that not a lot of people have seen." Nichols concludes by remarking of Shannon's Grey that "... he enters people's lives and very quickly has to ingratiate himself to them. Like he becomes their friend, so that he can take these really delicate photos." Shannon spoke of being on set for one day, and of the fact his scenes were shot in order, wherein he stated, "... we shot the scene in the yard first. It was also the hardest to shoot because it started to rain, and then we kept stopping and starting." He later explained that "[Nichols] wasn't sure whether to shoot it in the rain or not. Once we got to the dinner scene, that went fast. We did the couch scene, and I was done." Loving marks the fifth collaboration between Shannon and Nichols.

Additionally, Terri Abney is introduced as Garnet Jeter, the sister of Mildred; Alano Miller appears as Raymond Green, the best friend of Richard; Jon Bass appears as Phil Hirschkop, a Virginia civil rights lawyer, and associate of Bernie Cohen; Bill Camp appears as Frank Beazley, a former lawyer to the Lovings; David Jensen appears as Judge Bazile, the Caroline County judge who indicted the Lovings in 1958 for violating Virginia's Racial Integrity Act; Sharon Blackwood appears as Lola Loving, Richard's mother; Christopher Mann appears as Theoliver Jeter, Mildred's father; Winter-Lee Holland appears as Musiel Byrd-Jeter, the mother of Mildred; Michael Abbott Jr. appears as Deputy Cole, one of the law officers charged with arresting the couple; Chris Greene appears as Percy Fortune, a good friend of the Lovings, in particular, Richard; Will Dalton appears as Virgil, a very loyal friend to Richard.

== Production ==
=== Development ===
... The producers approached me and asked me to consider it. Nancy Buirski, who made the documentary The Loving Story (2011) ..., Colin Firth, and Ged Doherty, they reached out and asked if I would watch the documentary. And it didn't take long. Pretty much from the moment it ended I had my approach which was to concentrate on the day-to-day lives of the Lovings. I gave them a call and said "Look, this is my interpretation of it—this was kind of on the heels of The Help coming out back in 2011, and it made a boatload of money—and I said, "I'm gonna make a really slow, really quiet film and I don't know if it's gonna be the feel-good experience of the year. And there's potential for someone to make a film like that out of this story so if you guys really want that then I'm not the right guy for you. But if you're willing to go this other way then let's keep talking." That's kind of the way it developed.

— Jeff Nichols, on the development and approach of Loving

On April 6, 2009, while filming John Doyle's Main Street (2010) in Durham, North Carolina, Colin Firth had stumbled upon the story of Richard and Mildred Loving, before being introduced to filmmaker Nancy Buirski. Buirski herself had recently read the obituary of Mildred Loving in The New York Times, and spoke to Firth about her plans on making a documentary about the couple. Buirski had been in contact with Firth regarding a feature version of the story after learning of his interest in American politics and social history, to which Firth and herself began to brainstorm a narrative structure as well as beginning work on a screenplay. On January 25, 2011, Firth mentioned to Buirski that he was launching a production company, Raindog Films, with Ged Doherty, and had brought up a narrative version of The Loving Story (2011) to Doherty, to which Doherty remarked, "[Firth] was very taken with the simplicity of the story, with how this ordinary couple made a huge difference in the lives of other couples." In an interview with Entertainment Weekly, Firth spoke of his surprise as to how many had not known of Richard and Mildred's story. He also stated, "So I shared the idea with my friend [Doherty], who comes from the music industry, and that's what started us off as producers." On April 29, 2011, after a successful Kickstarter campaign, Buirski's The Loving Story was shown at the Full Frame Documentary Film Festival, before a release of February 14, 2012, on HBO, to which it received universal acclaim.

In June 2012, after watching Take Shelter (2011), producers Colin Firth, Ged Doherty and Nancy Buirski approached director Jeff Nichols, as they believed him to be the perfect writer and director for the project. He had been introduced to Buirski's documentary The Loving Story (2011), to which Nichols himself immediately found emotional and narrative attachments to Richard and Mildred, wherein he stated, "I walked away from that documentary with a really clear idea that I wanted to make a film that followed Richard and Mildred and stayed with their point of view." Initially, Nichols was reluctant to write and direct the film, as he had never been commissioned to write a screenplay before. But he eventually agreed to write a script, which would be a strict blueprint for what he wanted to do, to which he later remarked: "This was on the heels of The Help (2011) ... There was a different movie to be made out of this story for sure, probably one that would be much more successful commercially." Nichols underwent extensive research for Loving, such as meeting Peggy Loving, who is the only surviving child of the Lovings, going to all the locations relevant to the story, delving through footage including extended interviews, archival footage, and photographs from Buirski.

On May 16, 2013, Screen International reported that in conjunction with Nancy Buirski at Augusta Films, Colin Firth's Raindog Films and Silver Reel are developing a feature film on Richard Loving and Mildred Loving, inspired by Buirski's documentary. Firth had initially toyed with the idea of writing Loving, however, at Martin Scorsese's recommendation, who was eager to see The Loving Story (2011) turned into a feature, both Firth and Buirski hired Nichols. Nichols described Scorsese as "a shepherd of this project and wanted to see it made into a narrative film", and later laid out his approach in terms of trying to stay with the Lovings as much as possible through the telling of the story, something of which Scorsese was very supportive of. On May 8, 2015, Deadline Hollywood reported that Jeff Nichols was boarding the project as director and will write the script, with Joel Edgerton and Ruth Negga starring as Richard and Mildred Loving, respectively, the interracial couple at the center of the famous 1967 civil rights case Loving v. Virginia. On May 8, 2015, it was announced that Big Beach and Raindog films are to produce Nichols' piece, with producers including Sarah Green, Colin Firth, Ged Doherty, Nancy Buirski, Marc Turtletaub, and Peter Saraf. Prior to the production of Loving, director Nichols spoke briefly of his influence for the film, such as Nancy Buirski's The Loving Story (2011), to which Nichols stated, "I was struck by the simplicity of The Loving Story, and I hope to make this a painfully beautiful film."

On September 22, 2015, Variety officially reported that Michael Shannon had been cast to play Grey Villet, the Life Magazine photographer who shot the iconic images of the Lovings in 1965, as well as Nick Kroll in an as-of-yet unnamed role. In addition to Shannon and Kroll, on September 22, 2015, Bill Camp, Marton Csokas, and Jon Bass were cast as Frank Beazley, Sheriff Brooks, and Phil Hirschkop, respectively.

On May 16, 2016, Nichols, in an interview with Vox's Gregory Ellwood, spoke of when development on Loving first began four years ago, he thought the film would help influence the Supreme Court's debate over same-sex marriage, in which Nichols stated, "[After the verdict came in] there was this idea that it was all going to be taken care of, and of course it's not ... You have religious liberty laws added and you soon realize that the Supreme Court can only do so much. The letter of the law sometimes gets it right. But it takes a long time for society to get it right, and that is what has always been surprising to me. We never got over that hurdle, and maybe we never will." Speaking at the press conference for the film in Cannes, on May 16, 2016, Negga spoke of her hopes that the issue addressed in the film will become part of a broader discussion. On May 20, 2016, during a Q&A session at Cannes when asked of the film's focus, Nichols speaks of the topics of race and marriage inequality, wherein he states, "... the conversation about racism in the US is finally starting to get serious. That made me feel good that just by making this movie people are going to talk about inequality. Had I tried to make a movie that encompasses the civil rights movement, I would feel like a fraud."

On September 8, 2016, The Hollywood Reporter reported that due to films like The Birth of a Nation (2016) and Loving (2016) dealing with issues of race at the Toronto International Film Festival, Canadian filmmakers have unveiled plans to promote better representation by 2020. On October 21, 2016, Nichols was interviewed by The Hollywood Reporter, to which he spoke of the film being an important subject matter, as well as stating it to be a "foundational part of our American history." On November 5, 2016, in an interview with The Chicago Sun-Times, Edgerton expressed a passion for the film, wherein he stated, "I was very emotionally connected to it ... I mean as an audience member. Usually, it's a subjective thing watching your own movies. But this was different. I was standing back, happy about the ultimate Supreme Court decision, but I did feel a very deep anger." He later concluded: "This is still happening today. Today, it's about same-sex couples getting married. What business is it of anyone but the two people involved?" On December 14, 2016, Deadline Hollywood reported that although Nichols' screenplay for Loving has been classified as an original screenplay by the Writers Guild of America, the Academy of Motion Picture Arts and Sciences had concluded that Loving should only be eligible to compete within the Best Adapted Screenplay category.

=== Filming ===
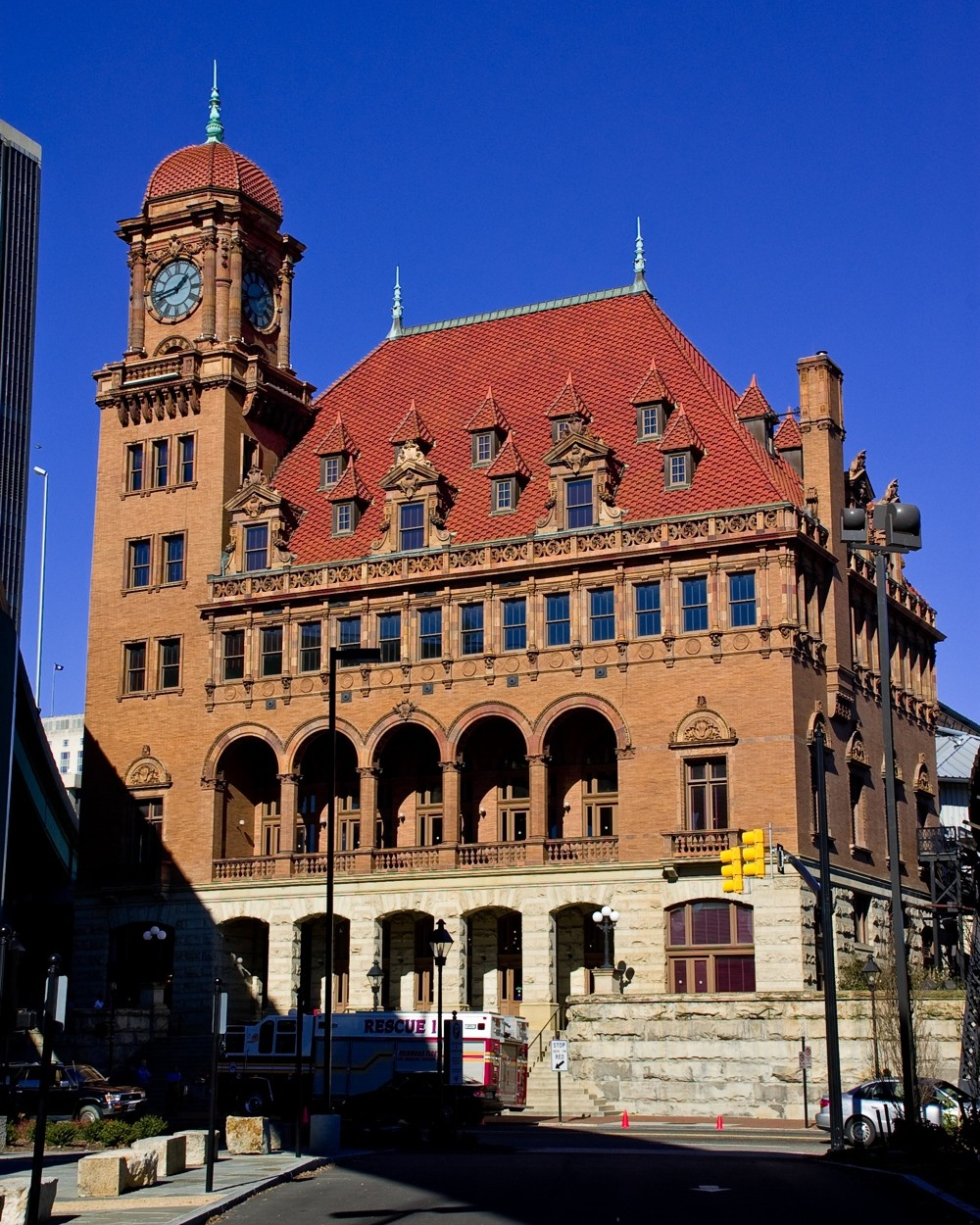
Principal photography for Loving took place in Richmond, Virginia.

Governor of Virginia Terry McAuliffe announced, on May 14, 2015, that Virginia has been selected as the filming location for Jeff Nichols' Loving. On May 14, 2015, Andy Edmunds, director of the Virginia Film Office, confirmed that filming will take place from Caroline County, Virginia, to Dinwiddie County, Virginia. As the piece will film in the central Virginia area, Loving will be eligible for a filming incentive, with the exact amount based on expenditures in Virginia and certain deliverables to promote tourism in the Commonwealth. On June 16, 2015, it was announced that Ged Doherty, Colin Firth, Nancy Buirski, Sarah Green, Marc Turtletaub and Peter Saraf were holding three casting calls open to people of all ages and ethnic backgrounds on June 25, June 27, and June 28, with over four-thousand people turning out. Principal photography was confirmed to have begun in Richmond, Virginia, with an original shooting schedule occurring from September 16 to October 27, 2015, albeit shooting was altered to finish on November 19, 2015.

On September 19, 2015, it was confirmed that Loving would film numerous scenes at Union Hill in October and early November. On September 29, 2015, the Lawrenceville–Brunswick Municipal Airport in Lawrenceville, Virginia, was converted for drag strip scenes up until the period of September 30. Vintage cars from the 1950s were used and the stars and extras of the movie were dressed in period costumes for the scenes that were filmed, with over 125 people onsite during the two days of filming. On October 9, 2015, Bowling Green's Main Street had been transformed to resemble a scene from the late 1950s, with the production team blocking off Main Street and shooting in front of the original courthouse. On October 12, 2015, filming occurred outside 2201 E. Franklin Street, Richmond between the hours of 6 a.m. and 8 p.m. On October 15, 2015, vintage vehicles were spotted in the area around Venable Street in Richmond. On October 28, 2015, filming had begun in Petersburg, with the main filming location occurring along Sycamore Street from Washington Street to Bank Street from 7 a.m. to 8 p.m. On November 3, 2015, with filming occurring at the Museum District, Richmond, Virginia.

On November 19, 2015, the final day of filming, shooting took place at Richmond Dragway in Sandston, Virginia and other locations across Virginia. Filming also took place in Ashland, Berkeley Plantation in Charles City County, Church Hill, Virginia Historical Society, Supreme Court of Virginia, Old City Hall, Crewe's Place in Charles City County, and Hopewell, Virginia, as well as scenes on private property in the localities of Ruther Glen, Prince George, Tappahannock, Hanover County and King William County. Principal photography was confirmed to have ended in Virginia on October 27, 2015, however, additional periods of shooting were added with filming being push up until November 19, 2015, while with post-production beginning subsequent to filming closure, and on April 1, 2016, still occurring during the press tour for Midnight Special.

=== Cinematography ===
XL2s are ideal for any shooting configuration and, coupled with the lush G Series lenses, make everything look superb. [Nichols] and I have stuck with the combination on Midnight Special and Loving ... The complexities and nuances found in the G Series are not found in any other lens system. They are perfectly imperfect. They provide beautiful imagery without being overtly precise or clinical. The best word to describe the lenses is 'soulful,' similar to an old Leica rangefinder or a really good wine.

— Adam Stone, on filming Loving with Panavision Millennium XL2 cameras and G-Series anamorphic lenses.

Loving was shot on 35 mm film with small Panavision Millennium XL2 cameras in a distributed aspect ratio of 2.35:1 by cinematographer Adam Stone. He used Panavision G-Series anamorphic lenses, to which he attributes part of the effectiveness for the high shot looking down on Richard as he proposes to Mildred in a grassy field. Stone said, "We were a modestly budgeted movie and to have people like Dave Dodson and Dan Sasaki at Panavision reserve and tweak those lenses for us – knowing they are in high demand for much bigger movies – made all the difference." He concluded, "For that scene in particular, whatever you hit was the lens' sweet spot. They are so awesome." Of the anamorphic format, Stone stated, "Anamorphic is how we shot Shotgun Stories (2007), it's how we shot Mud (2012), it's how we shot Midnight Special (2016), and now it's how we shot Loving."

Stone spoke of one of his favorite scenes, in which Richard smuggles Mildred back into Virginia at night, and she jumps out of one car and into another. He explained that the car headlights and moonlight would have been the only true sources of light on that road, "So we used bounced HMI's, and it balanced out nicely. We used some day-for-night driving shots at dusk, and could have benefited from an Alexa for POV's. But shooting with the actors at night [in a process car] on film was so much fun. We only had one Bebee [light]." Stone made comparisons to Mud (2012), for which he had at least five film stocks to choose from – 50D to 250D, 100 to 500 tungsten and a Fuji 500 Daylight, whereas Loving was shot with Vision 3 500T and 250D. "That's pretty much all that's left nowadays, for better or worse. Of course the Vision stock is so well put together, you could shoot everything on 500T and it would still hold up great." On why he prefers using film, as well as using it on Loving, Stone spoke of the format having a comfortability about it, as well as it feeling "like an organic format".

Stone also used a J.L. Fisher 10 dolly, a J.L. Fisher 23 jib arm, and a Mo-Sys Hot Head to put the camera right over the actors, in order to get closer to them as they moved about. Stone remarked that, "It took a little adjusting to but over time we got pretty proficient shooting predominantly with that configuration." He later explained, "We had to improvise when we got into smaller areas where we couldn't easily operate the camera but the overall effect was being just that much closer to the actors [particularly Negga and Edgerton] and their performances." Stone wished for the camera to be moved, however, not wanting it to be Steadicam, as to be more online with the character. He explains that: "If an actor's moving at camera, we wanted to be straight on or [slightly] off axis. We used a dolly with a boom and a hothead for more stability."

Of Stone, Nichols praised his artistry and hard work on Loving: "So many Southern-set films have an antique-y glow. We work against that. Mildred was in love with this countryside in Virginia, enough to leave her home in D.C. and live in hiding, in risk of arrest." Nichols made mention of the fact that the audience had to feel how beautiful the area of Caroline County, Virginia, was, albeit didn't want the film to feel "affected or sweetened". He concluded by stating, "[Stone] has worked on all five of my films, so we communicate via osmosis. But at some point we said, "We are not setting out to make a 'beautiful' film, but a film that supports the lives of these characters.""

=== Design ===
==== Costumes ====
We used wardrobe in those moments to give Mildred strength or to show her excitement. The scene when [Mildred and Richard] first meet the [civil rights] lawyers, I think she knew that she was starting to become a representative and voice for others and we were careful to show that she cared how she was portraying herself.

— Erin Benach, on the practice of conveying Mildred's strength and emotion through her wardrobe in Loving.

Costume designer Erin Benach, who worked with Nichols previously on Midnight Special, explained that for the film she had a large amount of historical imagery, and rich material to sift through, including Buirski's documentary. She also spoke of wanting to extend her research via a regional search of people who were in that location at that time, wherein Benach stated, "What did people living there look like? What did they wear? You find all of that by looking through images of the place and the people as they were during that time." Benach acknowledged the difficulties in portraying time passing in a naturalistic, authentic way, though remarks the subtly shift the fashion to which he adheres to as one wouldn't wish for "... the audience to be noticing the costume changes as they happen."

In preparation for Loving, Benach mapped out the years in the evolution of clothing, to which she states, "I wanted to know what the fashion of the time was but also what it would be based on where the characters in Loving ... were at any given moment." For the design of Negga's Mildred, Benach at al pulled from a great many sources, using a photograph of the real Mildred in a black-and-white check dress and little jacket, of which Benach was determined to find, or create it, with her ultimately finding it at American Costume. On Mildred's move to Washington, D.C., Benach was mindful of the fact there would have been a sartorial shift of sorts, ergo, with her using more of the skirts and the little blouses, as opposed to the housedresses. Benach expressed that, "We made that shift because it was a natural change in her life. She went from country living to city living in a matter of a day. We thought over time, we would feel the difference between the country and the city." The eventual maternity design was difficult as Benach had to ensure that the bumps looked like the right stages of her pregnancy.

Regarding the costume design of Richard, Benach expressed that for finding the essence of this character, for Edgerton, it was in the pants' rise and how the pants fit him to emulate how Richard's pants fit him, and also the way Edgerton's body would move in the clothing, in which she states, "[Edgerton] started to kind of feel out Richard's stance in the way he would stand and put his head a little forward, all of that started to happen in those fittings, in those first beginning fittings." Benach spoke of her objective in creating costumes that support the story, not attempting to distract nor take the viewer out of the moment, and she further expresses this sentiment by stating, "This story is a story of friendship and love between Richard and Mildred and I'd never wanted to detract from those moments."

==== Production design ====
I drove to North Carolina and pretty much pulled everything out of his garage and put it in our set. To me that was kind of a throw out to my dad. That was a special set for me to do ... [On shooting in areas where the Lovings had lived] Almost every day when I was driving by to prep a set, I literally was passing their graves. It was like they were there, making the film with us.

— Chad Keith, on his late auto mechanic father, and the magical feeling felt when making Loving.

Production designer Chad Keith, who worked with Nichols previously on Take Shelter and Midnight Special, commented that the greatest creative challenge was to do justice to the Lovings, while also acknowledging his interest in working on a film about actual living persons. Keith stressed the importance of the location, to which his team and himself tried to match up the locations to where and how the Lovings lived, in which he explained, "There are different sorts of income levels represented throughout their whole family that we wanted to show in the film. We bounced around all over Virginia and in D.C." Keith remarked that it was his first period piece, and from the beginning, one of the first things [Nichols] asked was whether he thought we could pull it off, to which he stated, "I was certain we could."

Nichols himself spoke of how both Keith and Erin Benach with keeping him "period correct." Keith spoke of Adam Stone and his experiences finding existing locations that were shootable, and once found both men spent a lot of time scouting. Keith later explained that: "Once you find the perfect location, you have to gut it, and start from scratch, and that experience is fun." He also spoke of his adamant approach of not placing anything that isn't required to be on screen: "If it doesn't make sense that the characters would have used it, then to me it makes no sense for it to be there." Some of the original locations, including the Bowling Green jail and courthouse, remained intact, though in other cases, Keith had to improvise: "Originally, we thought we could just roll into town, pull up to the perfect house and replicate everything easily." Stone re-fashioned renovated houses to resemble the Lovings' country abodes as a lot of the places were falling apart. He also stuck with the key approach of simplicity within Loving, as he stated, "The story was about the Lovings. We did not want to draw attention to their environments. They were very simple people. I wanted to make what came across on screen as simple as possible as well."

Keith also noted that because Nichols and Stone always shoot on film, and because there was so little practical lighting in the time period portrayed, he worked hard to keep spaces light and bright "to reflect the light Adam could get in there", and to avoid the use of dark window coverings so Stone "could use as much natural light as possible." On the high shot looking down on Richard, as he proposes to Mildred in a grassy field, Keith described the shot as a "perfect use of anamorphic that sums up what the film is about. They just want to be together ...", while stating he's learnt a great deal from both Nichols and Stone in the designing for the anamorphic frame to which he concludes, "My goal is always to do my very best to give them a 360-degree look if the money allows."

The Lovings' actual house in King and Queen County was deemed too small to film in, which resulted in Stone's discovery of a stand-alone farmhouse built in the 1920s south of Richmond. Keith described the process as following, "The inside of the house was immediately stripped, the kitchen pulled out, the enclosed porch on the back taken down and rebuilt to match the original one in the photos I liked, and lots and lots of painting and wallpapering action." One of the challenges for the art department was the 1950s grocery store scene and a similar hardware store sequence, in which the stores have to be period correct, as well as the product on the shelves and aisles.

==== Sound ====
Will Files and Brandon Proctor were the sound engineer for Loving, tasked with sound mixing, while Files, as a sound editor, supervised the process. Jeff Nichols spoke of sound as a narrative construct in Loving, while mentioning the audience looking in one direction when a sound suddenly erupts from the other. Nichols made note of Files' innate understanding of perceived reality, while commenting on his great ability to compress that artifice as much as possible, and make to it resemble reality, to which he remarked afterwards that: "We spent so much time on the background crickets for the opening of the film, because we had a few iterations that were too much, and then a few iterations that weren't quite enough. Inevitably one bullfrog would jump in and then we would have to go delete it. You don't want anything to be overt or artificial." Nichols concluded by stating, "It's a dance that we do in every department and every facet of the filmmaking ... If sound is done well, no one will ever notice it. They'll just feel it."

== Music ==
The soundtrack is composed by David Wingo, who worked with Nichols previously on Take Shelter (2011), Mud (2012), and Midnight Special (2016). Nichols wished for the score of Loving to be orchestral, classical, while not contemporary sounding, whereas Wingo wanted it to feel "like it could have been from any time." He took Ennio Morricone's compositions for Days of Heaven (1978), The Battle of Algiers (1966), and The Mission as an influence for the score of Loving. The score was recorded at the 12th Street Sound, with a 14-piece string ensemble of local musicians scored for the string portions. The original score for Loving was released by Back Lot Music on November 4, 2016, followed by a physical release on November 11.

Wingo remarked that the score for Loving needed to be "elemental and simple to a certain degree while avoiding any sentimentality to capture the grace and beauty of Richard and Mildred." He stated that all of his scores for [Nichols] in the past have had elements of an orchestral background, however, he knew that the main themes for Loving needed to contain a traditional orchestral score without any modern elements. He concluded by stating of Nichols that, "The other main thing that [Nichols] needed the score to accomplish was to really reflect the always-present anxiety and tension that they were living with all these years. Those pieces don't just operate in a different way than the other themes but are completely different instrumentation as well, with hardly any orchestral elements."

== Influences ==
... We used an offset jib arm with a remote head, so that you could get these very precise moves.As soon as you set up a dolly, you're changing the orchestration of the shot. Your actors have a movement that you don't want to affect or impact. Then you've got a dolly grip moving a thing. You've got another dolly grip who's on the boom arm, making it go up and down and side to side. Then you've got your [assistant camera] who's off on these focus wheels, that are off of the dolly.

— Jeff Nichols, on the inculcation of Roger Deakins' cinematographic approach in No Country for Old Men (2007), for Loving.

Director Jeff Nichols said that influences, such as his thoughts on his own marriage, allowed him the ability to convey the commitment that the Lovings had to one another, with Nichols stating, "It's about how you stay committed through hard times, harrowing times, like for the Lovings, but also mundane times and the daily parts of life. When I look at my own marriage, that's where the love is. That's where the real work is." Nichols spoke of influences No Country For Old Men (2007) afforded to him, such as giving him an answer to a question relating to a dolly, by which cinematographer Adam Stone and key grip Rocky Ford used a great rig accompanied with a jib arm and a remote head: an approach used by Roger Deakins.

In approaching the story, Nichols referred to Nancy Buirski's The Loving Story (2011), as well as a hard drive given to him by Buirski with all of the archival 16mm black-and-white footage that Hope Ryden shot in the mid-'60s, every interview the Lovings ever gave. Nichols remarked that every interview that Buirski did was all their friends and relatives and people that knew them, with Nichols being in possession of all the outtakes. To prepare for their roles, both Edgerton and Negga watched The Loving Story (2011), as well as Ryden's extensive footage. Grey Villet's LIFE Magazine photography was influential to the body language structuring by Edgerton and Negga, with Edgerton remarking that they would study the postures of the Lovings in Villet's photography. As well as notable influences from Nancy Buirski's documentary, Nichols spoke of Phyl Newbeck's Virginia Hasn't Always Been for Lovers: Interracial Marriage Bans and the Case of Richard and Mildred Loving (2004), in which Nichols draws upon several times in his adaptation, wherein Nichols stated, "All through that process it was a different version of that gestational thinking, because I would read a line in Newbeck's book about the Lovings' son being hit by a car, or about Richard drawing blueprints for the home he's going to build her before they get arrested, and for all these things I thought, "Well, that could be a scene," and I started lying out the structure for it." Newbeck is thanked in the film's credits.

Production designer Chad Keith stated that The Color Purple (1985) influenced Lovings production design: "I started researching way before we started prepping which films to watch for research or what photography to check out. I watched The Color Purple which is a great film. I hadn't seen it in ages, and when I watched it I was looking at the detail, but I decided I didn't want to watch anything else for reference." He concluded by stating that: "We're making our own film."

Cinematographer Adam Stone mentioned that Nichols and he referenced films they saw growing up, specifically that of '80s Steven Spielberg in which the characters are stacked into triangles in the wide and deep anamorphic frame, to which Stone makes a reference to the scene where Richard has been protesting for the release of Mildred at the County courthouse: "We do a massive focus rack toward the [Sheriff's voice], and our attention now shifts to the Sheriff, watching Joel over his shoulder in the same frame. I love this compounding of information that anamorphic allows, even in interior dialogue scenes; it makes the world feel more tangible." Stone spoke of the work of Grey Villet as being one of the "greatest treasure troves", while stating Villet's photography not only influenced the cinematography but the script, production design, and costume design.

== Themes ==
The film is described as an apolitical film, following different emotional arcs about the human condition, including family relationships and love, as such as Nichols' Shotgun Stories (2007), Take Shelter (2011), Mud (2012), and Midnight Special (2016), wherein these themes are also explored. Nichols also mentions the themes of love, human rights, cultural and institutionalized racism, and of overcoming bigotry. Nichols remarked that both Richard and Mildred Loving represent what are important about political debates, whilst remarking that once political or religious debates are engaged then the themes or ideals come about, to which he states, "I think people just start thinking about themselves and what they're comfortable with and what they think is right and wrong in their moral compass."

According to Ruth Negga, a primary theme of Loving is hope. Negga spoke of how such a theme of the film was interconnected with Mildred: "... she was a hopeful person. You're drawn to those people as well, because they inspire hope in you, and I think she was very much the rock of her family, and for Richard. You want to orbit that."

== Historical accuracy ==
Following a screening of Loving, at the Princeton Garden Theater in Princeton, New Jersey, producer Peter Saraf held an open Q&A discussion with the audience, in which he touched on such topics as the film's historical authenticity, in which he described the film as true to life: "Richard Loving was indeed as stoic as Nichols and Edgerton portray him; the small rural Virginia community in which they lived was (and is) highly racially integrated; Mildred Loving really did write directly to Robert Kennedy, and her letter is still in the Kennedy collection; and the Lovings' lawyer really did, per Richard's request, relay his words before the Supreme Court that "I love my wife.""

Edgerton spoke of Nichols' aim to strike a "sense of authenticity and truth" in Loving, with the actor himself remarking his and Negga's attempt to try to look, sound, and act as close as possible to the way Richard and Mildred really were. He was intent on verisimilitude, to which Nichols began to state, "I didn't feel comfortable making things up with this story—the jail was the same jail they stayed in. The front shot of the courthouse was the same courthouse." The Lovings' surviving child, Peggy Loving, was a consultant to the production. She visited the set and was struck by how thoroughly the actors had channeled her parents – in character and in costume.

According to Saraf, both Bernie Cohen and Phil Hirschkop were consulted on the film, despite no longer being on speaking terms with one another. The makers of the film did change some of the details, with Nichols inventing some characters and scenes, however, he sought to stay as true to the Lovings' story as possible. Speaking to Coverage Opinions, Hirschkop expressed his view on Jon Bass' portrayal of himself, with Hirschkop remarking that Bass was too mild mannered and nothing like himself, and while Hirschkop mentions that Loving served its purpose as a film, he also listed several discrepancies between the film and what actually occurred.

Mark Loving, the grandson to Mildred Loving, said his grandma is not African American as portrayed by Ruth Negga with Ethiopian blood, but rather Native American as Rappahannock Indian.

== Marketing ==
On October 23, 2015, TheWrap promoted Loving by releasing the first image of the film, featuring Edgerton's Richard Loving and Negga's Mildred Loving. On July 12, 2016, Loving was promoted by the release of a trailer by Focus Features, was praised by reviewers. The Huffington Post's Zeba Blay described the trailer as "breathtaking", while noting it to be a beautiful testimony to the concept of love verses racial divide. The New York Times's Mekado Murphy stated that the trailer "suggests the film will make a strong case for Oscar consideration a year after the Academy was the subject of blistering criticism for its all-white slate of acting nominees." Time's Eliza Berman wrote that the trailer "offers a glimpse of a simple life violently interrupted by a sheriff with a flashlight in the middle of the night."

== Release ==
=== Theatrical ===
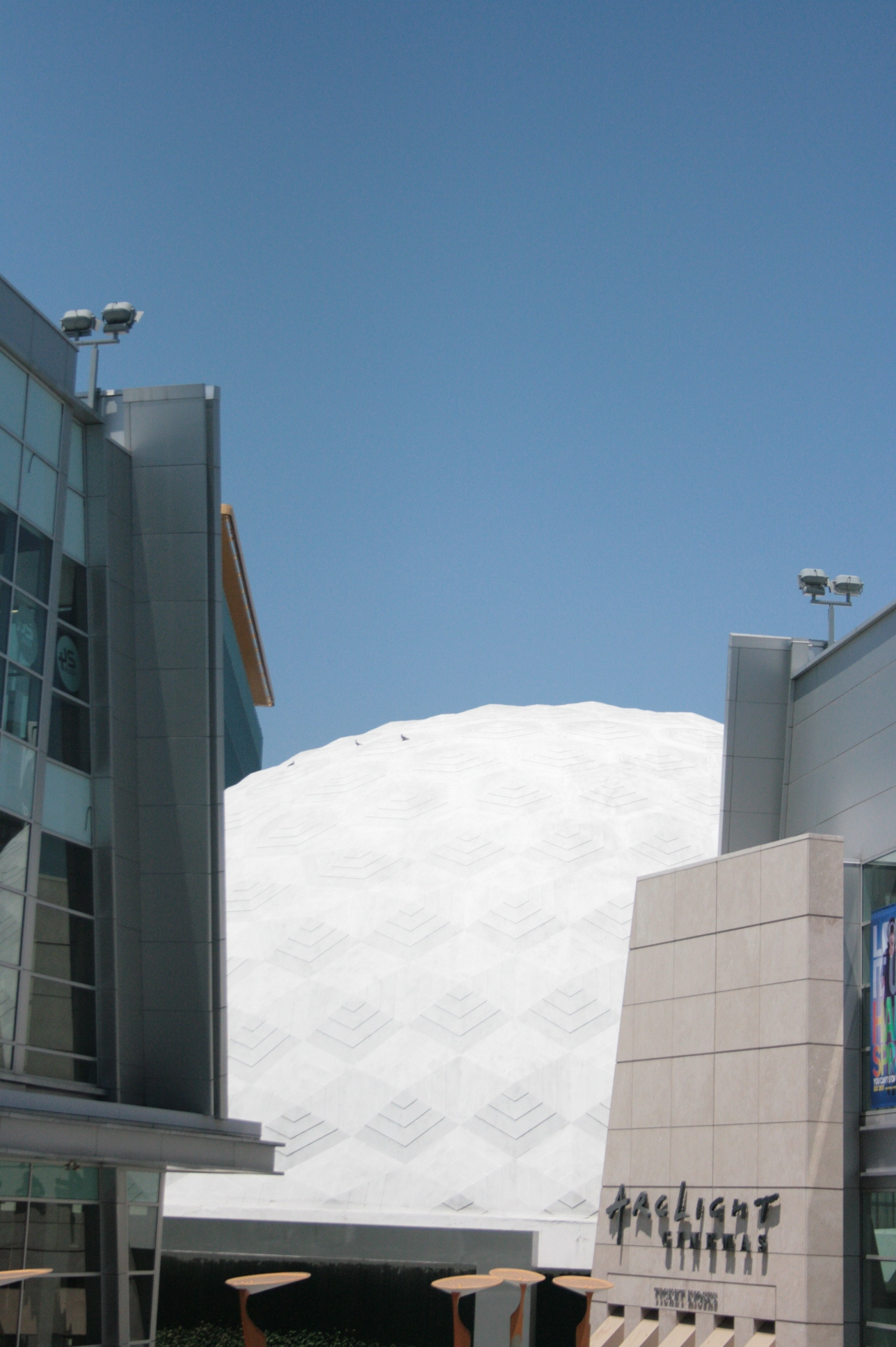
The ArcLight Hollywood in Hollywood, California hosted a limited theatrical showing of Loving.

Loving premiered at the Cannes Film Festival, on May 16, 2016, in Cannes, France, where it had been selected to compete for the Palme d'Or, before screening at the Champs-Élysées Film Festival, in which it had been selected to open, on June 7, 2016. On May 16, 2015, it was announced that Mars Distribution had acquired distribution rights to the film in France. On February 13, 2016, Deadline Hollywood announced at the Berlin International Film Festival that Focus Features had acquired distribution rights to the film, including distribution in North America and international territories, such as the United Kingdom, Germany, and Latin America.

Loving began a limited release in the United States on November 4, 2016, in four locations in New York City and Los Angeles, including ArcLight Hollywood and The Landmark, before moving to a wider release on November 23, 2016. Before opening in general release across Europe, on January 17, 2017, it expanded to Australia, ahead of a bow in the United Kingdom and Ireland on February 3. On February 9, it opened in Israel, and then in France on February 15, and Estonia and Sweden on February 17, ahead of its final bow in Germany and the Netherlands on February 23.

=== Pre-screenings ===
Prior to Loving's public release, on September 8, 2016, the film screened at the Toronto International Film Festival, where it opened in the official sidebar section, Gala Presentations. The Atlantic hosted an early screening of Loving on September 28, 2016, in Washington, D.C., with a discussion of the case prior to the screening. On October 6, 2016, the film was chosen to open the Hamptons International Film Festival, followed by a private screening for students and faculty at Clark Atlanta University on October 9, and the Austin Film Festival on October 13, 2016. On October 13, an advanced screening was held at Landmark's E Street Cinema in Washington, D.C., featuring a panel discussion with Philip Hirschkop. Loving was selected to screen at Festival do Rio in Rio de Janeiro, Brazil on October 10, until October 17, 2016. The film was selected as the closing-night film of the Mill Valley Film Festival on October 16, and on October 20, it held its L.A. premiere at the Academy of Motion Picture Arts and Sciences in Beverly Hills, California. On October 23, the film was screened as the Sunday Morning Spotlight section of the Middleburg Film Festival in Middleburg, Virginia. Subsequent showings were held at the National Museum of African American History and Culture in Washington, D.C., on October 24; the Landmark Sunshine Cinema in New York City, on October 27; a private screening for the Writers Guild of America, East, at the AMC Lincoln Square in New York City on October 27; and at the American Film Festival in Wrocław, Poland, on October 29. Additionally, on November 2, 2016, a private screening of the film was held for the cast and crew at the Byrd Theatre in Richmond, Virginia.

== Reception ==
=== Box office ===
Loving opened to an estimated $169,000 from four theaters for a per screen average of $42,250, the year's fifth highest PTA debut, after Moonlight (2016) ($100,519), Don't Think Twice (2016) ($92,835), the re-release of Howards End (1992) ($52,568), and The Lobster (2015) ($47,563), making it No. 1 at the indie box office in its opening weekend, with its average significantly beating Doctor Strange (2016). Comparatively, Focus Features debuted The Theory of Everything (2014) over the same weekend in 2014, where it delivered a $41,753 PTA.

In its second weekend, Loving brought in an estimated $532,000 ($11,565 PTA), at 46 theaters, making it No. 1 at the platform box office in its weekend, with its average beating Doctor Strange (2016), Arrival (2016), Hacksaw Ridge (2016), Moonlight (2016), and Miss Peregrine's Home for Peculiar Children (2016). Next weekend, it expanded to a total of approximately 100 locations, including theaters in Baltimore, Houston, Seattle, St. Louis and Denver. Additionally, its third weekend, Loving expanded to a total of 137 theaters, wherein it brought in an estimated $854,000 ($6,234 PTA) for a $1.7 million domestic cumulative, moving to No. 2 at the platform box office, behind Moonlight, although above in average. On November 23, 2016, it will expand into an additional 284 theaters.

In its fourth weekend, Loving topped the limited release box office at No. 1 with an expansion to 421 locations, grossing over $1,691,000 ($4,017 average). Over the five-day holiday weekend, Focus Features stated that Loving grossed $2,129,000 ($5,057 average), giving it a four-week cumulative of $4,069,771. In its fifth weekend, Nichols' Loving was toppled, in limited release box office, by Kenneth Lonergan's Manchester By the Sea (2016), with the film subsequently falling by 41% to the No. 2 spot among smaller releases. It was projected to earn $623,380 on its sixth weekend, at 572 locations, while still maintaining its No. 2 spot in the limited release box office, behind Manchester by the Sea (2016); it earned $633,993, for a $6.8 million domestic cumulative. By its seventh weekend, Loving fell to the fifth-highest-grossing film for the weekend within the limited release box office. BoxOffice estimated that during the holiday weekend, Loving was expected to gross $76,930 in the three-day frame, while hitting $107,730 for the four-day weekend, where it grossed $92,919.

=== Critical response ===
On review aggregator Rotten Tomatoes, the film has an approval rating of 88%, based on 295 reviews, with an average rating of 7.60/10. The website's critical consensus reads, "Loving takes an understated approach to telling a painful—and still relevant—real-life tale, with sensitive performances breathing additional life into a superlative historical drama." Metacritic, another review aggregator, assigned the film a weighted average score of 79 out of 100, based on 46 critics, indicating "generally favorable" reviews.

The film received a five-minute standing ovation following its premiere at the Cannes Film Festival. The Hollywood Reporter, People, and Essence, among others, identified it as an Oscar contender. Ann Hornaday of The Washington Post heralded the film and its director, Jeff Nichols, by stating: "Rather than deliver a rote—if rousing—rehearsal of the facts of the Lovings' case, [Nichols] makes the counterintuitive decision to allow them to live in front of the camera", with Hornaday continuing by praising him as "too astute a filmmaker to be unaware of the analogies "Loving" invites regarding marriage equality, but he wisely leaves agendas and polemics behind." Stephanie Zacharek of Time called it "beautifully restrained" and wrote, "Nichols ... tells the Lovings' story in a way that feels immediate and modern, and not just like a history lesson." Kate Taylor of The Globe and Mail spoke most highly of Edgerton and Negga, with Taylor stating, "Negga and Edgerton make these noble people three-dimensional, turning a docile, unambitious couple with neither the self-knowledge nor the words to launch a social revolution into unlikely protagonists in the civil-rights movement."

Peter Debruge of Variety praised Edgerton and Negga's performances as "powerful" and "uplifts [Nichols'] sensitive portrait of a mixed-race marriage forbidden in 1958 Virginia". Richard Lawson of Vanity Fair felt that "Edgerton is one of the more dynamic movie actors of his generation, and brings true commitment to his zipped-up, laconic portrayal of Richard, a man whose passion for his wife and family ran deep and quiet." Michelle Dean of The New Republic spoke most highly of the performances, writing, "Edgerton is likely to get more attention, though it is Negga's incredible performance that makes the film so powerfully subtle." Joe Morgenstern of The Wall Street Journal wrote, "Loving honors its subject, its audience and the movie medium." Peter Travers of Rolling Stone gave the film a three and a half-star rating, and said: "The stabbing simplicity of Negga's acting is breathtaking. Jeff Nichols has given us a quietly devastating film that resonates for the here and now and marches to the cadences of history and the heart."

In her review for The New York Times, Manohla Dargis wrote, "[Nichols'] most distinct aesthetic choice is the movie's quietness and the hush that envelops its first scene and that eventually defines the Lovings as much as their accents, gestures, manners and battles. Wendy Ide's four-star review for The Guardian stated "Nichols's understated approach to the story, devoid of dramatic grandstanding, chimes with the dignity of the Lovings who “won't bother anyone” if only they can be left alone to live their lives". Brian Tallerico's review for RogerEbert.com stated the film "has few twists and turns" but when the film ends, "one doesn't feel like they spent time being manipulated by awards bait or melodrama. One appreciates a story well-told and having been allowed a brief, believable window into the lives of Richard and Mildred Loving, two people who changed the country just by falling in love." Geoffrey Macnab of The Independent called Loving "a quiet film but a powerful and uplifting one – an intimate domestic drama in which the protagonists themselves hardly seem to notice their own historical role". Tim Grierson of Screen International gave a mixed review saying "the tasteful restraint doesn't lead to a greater emotional payoff".

=== Accolades ===
Loving has received numerous awards and nominations. It had been selected to compete for the Palme d'Or at the Cannes Film Festival. It received two nominations at the 74th Golden Globe Awards for Best Actor for Edgerton, and Best Actress for Negga. Negga also received a nomination for Best Actress at the 89th Academy Awards, and a nomination for BAFTA Rising Star Award at the 70th British Academy Film Awards. When the SAG-AFTRA announced the nominations honoring the best achievements in film on December 14, many media, including The Hollywood Reporter, Variety, Entertainment Weekly, USA Today, TheWrap, and Indiewire, criticized Loving's omission. In addition to several awards and nominations, Loving has been named as one of the best films of 2016 by various ongoing critics, appearing on several critics' end-of-year lists.

- 1st – Roger Moore, Movie Nation
- 2nd – Lawrence Toppman, The Charlotte Observer
- 3rd – Stephanie Zacharek, Time
- 3rd – Alex Biese, Asbury Park Press
- 3rd – Kenneth Turan, The Los Angeles Times
- 3rd – Tom Shone, These Violent Delights
- 3rd – Jason Bailey, Flavorwire
- 3rd – Kaitlyn Booth, Bleeding Cool
- 4th – Matthew Jacobs, The Huffington Post
- 4th – Rick Bentley, The Fresno Bee
- 6th – Seongyong Cho, Rogerebert.com
- 6th – Christina Newland, Rogerebert.com
- 6th – Paste
- 7th – Anne Thompson, Indiewire
- 7th – Calvin Wilson, St. Louis Post-Dispatch
- 7th – Sheila Benson, Parallax View
- 8th – Peter Travers, Rolling Stone
- 8th – Brian D. Johnson, Maclean's
- 9th – Sean Collier, Pittsburgh Magazine
- 10th – Christopher Orr, The Atlantic
- 10th – Jeffrey M. Anderson, The San Francisco Examiner
- 10th – Digg
- Top 10 (listed alphabetically, not ranked) – Leba Hertz, The San Francisco Chronicle
- Top 10 (listed alphabetically, not ranked) – Moira Macdonald, The Seattle Times
- Top 10 (listed alphabetically, not ranked) – Steven Rea, The Philadelphia Inquirer
- Top 10 (listed alphabetically, not ranked) – Joe Morgenstern, The Wall Street Journal
- Top 10 (listed alphabetically, not ranked) – John Horn, The Awards Show Show/The Frame
- Top 10 (listed alphabetically, not ranked) – Bob Mondello, National Public Radio

== See also ==
- List of black films of the 2010s
