= Ged Doherty =

British film and music industry executive

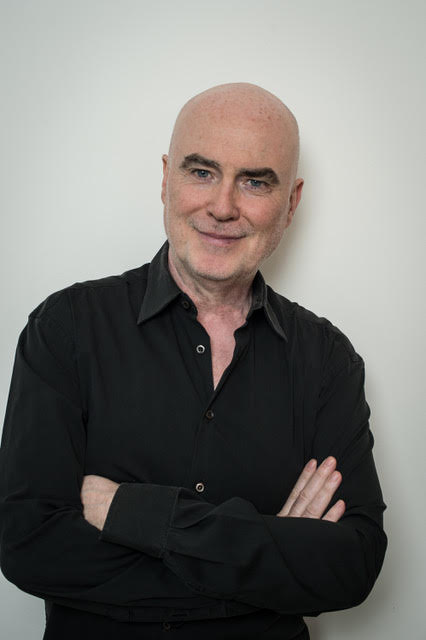
- Born: 1958
- Citizenship: British
- Education: Sheffield Hallam University
- Occupations: CEO and co-founder Raindog Films
- Years active: 1982 – present
- Organization(s): BAFTA; Producers Guild of America

Ged Doherty is a British film and music industry executive. Formerly the chairman of the British Phonographic Industry (BPI) and BRIT Awards Limited and the chairman and CEO of Sony Music UK, he is the CEO and co-founder of Raindog Films.

== Early life and education ==
Doherty was born in Glasgow, and raised in Wythenshawe, England. A lifelong music fan, he played drums with local bands in Manchester as a teenager before moving to Sheffield, where he attended Sheffield Hallam University (then known as Sheffield Polytechnic). As a student, he booked bands at the university, including The Damned, AC/DC, and Elvis Costello, and worked at the Sheffield Limit Club, where he booked Siouxsie and the Banshees to perform on the club's opening night. With frequent shows by artists such as Cabaret Voltaire, Human League, and Heaven 17, the Limit Club became a central element of the electro pop movement of the late 70s and early 80s.

== Career ==
=== 1990s: Management, Arista Records ===
Following his graduation, Doherty founded a management company. Among other artists, he managed Paul Young and Alison Moyet, who collectively sold more than 20 million albums. He was recruited by Epic Records in 1992; based in New York, he worked with artists including Michael Jackson, Oasis and Pearl Jam as the head of international marketing for the label. In 1996 he was named managing director of Columbia Records UK and returned to London.

In 1999, he became managing director of the Arista Label Group.

=== 2000s: BMG Music Group; Sony Music ===
Doherty was promoted to president of Arista's parent company, the BMG Music Group, in 2001. He was widely credited for the revitalization of artists and repertoire at BMG, and when it merged with Sony, he was named president of Sony BMG UK. He was appointed chairman and CEO of Sony Music UK in 2006. As the head of Sony Music UK, Doherty revived the Epic label, and oversaw the emergence of artists including Calvin Harris, Beyonce, Kasabian and the Foo Fighters. He also negotiated the "all important" 2010 global joint venture with Simon Cowell and Syco. In naming Doherty to their "Music Power 100" list in 2011, The Guardian wrote: "Behind the scenes (Doherty) has built a reputation as a shrewd strategist and an innovative taker of calculated business risks. Under Doherty's watch, Sony was the first major to restructure its promotional teams to reflect the way new media blurs boundaries between print and broadcast, and some of his senior appointments have been radical."

=== 2010s: Founding of Raindog Films LTD; BPI and BRIT Awards ===
In 2012, Doherty co-founded Raindog Films Ltd. with Colin Firth, a film production company based in London. Its first feature, Eye in the Sky, was directed by Gavin Hood and starred Helen Mirren, Aaron Paul, Alan Rickman, and Barkhad Abdi. It premiered at the Toronto International Film Festival in 2015 and was released theatrically in April 2016. The film grossed more than $38 million, becoming one of the best performing independent films of the year. Raindog's second film, Loving, written and directed by Jeff Nichols and starred Joel Edgerton and Ruth Negga, premiered at the Cannes Film Festival in May 2016. Negga was nominated for an Academy Award for her performance as Mildred Loving, and the film won the Producers Guild of America Stanley Kramer Award.

Doherty was appointed chairman of BPI and the BRIT Awards in December 2014. In 2016, the BRITs were criticized for a lack of diversity; no minority nominees won awards. Several days after the awards, Doherty published an open letter in The Guardian acknowledging that the organization needed to address the issue, stating that the responsibility to diversify the BRITS voting membership sat firmly in his lap. With the input of a committee of prominent black and Asian media and music professionals, 700 music industry figures were invited to vote for the following year's BRITS, resulting in a 2017 invitation list with 52% male, 48% female, and 17% BAME (Black, Asian and Minority Ethnic) representation. The 2017 BRIT nominees included artists linked to the "thriving UK urban music scene", reflecting the change in the voting body. He stepped down in July 2022 after 7 years in the role to focus on Raindog Films.

=== 2020s: Raindog Films ===
On November 6, 2020, Doherty was credited as a producer on New York Will Eat You Alive, the American film based on the Chinese webcomic Zombie Brother, with Colin Firth and Victor Ma set to star. In 2022, Doherty resigned as the chairman of BPI and the Brit Awards to focus full time on Raindog Films.
