= Loving v. Virginia =

1967 U.S. Supreme Court case on interracial marriage

- Supreme Court of the United States

Argued April 10, 1967 Decided June 12, 1967
- Full case name: Richard Perry Loving, Mildred (Jeter) Loving v. Virginia
- Citations: 388 U.S. 1 (more) 87 S. Ct. 1817; 18 L. Ed. 2d 1010; 1967 U.S. LEXIS 1082
- Argument: Oral argument

Case history
- Prior: Defendants convicted, Caroline County Circuit Court (January 6, 1959); motion to vacate judgment denied, Caroline County Circuit Court (January 22, 1959); affirmed in part, reversed and remanded, 147 S.E.2d 78 (Va. 1966); cert. granted, 385 U.S. 986 (1966).

Holding
- Under our Constitution, the freedom to marry or not marry, a person of another race resides with the individual and cannot be infringed by the State.

Court membership
- Chief Justice Earl Warren Associate Justices Hugo Black · William O. Douglas; Tom C. Clark · John M. Harlan II; William J. Brennan Jr. · Potter Stewart; Byron White · Abe Fortas

Case opinions
- Majority: Warren, joined by unanimous
- Concurrence: Stewart

Laws applied
- U.S. Const. amend. XIV; Va. Code §§ 20–58, 20–59
- This case overturned a previous ruling or rulings
- Pace v. Alabama (1883)

Loving v. Virginia, 388 U.S. 1 (1967), is a landmark civil rights decision of the United States Supreme Court which held that laws banning interracial marriage violate the Equal Protection and Due Process clauses of the Fourteenth Amendment to the U.S. Constitution.

The case involved Richard Loving, a white man, and his wife Mildred Loving, a woman of color. (Note: Mildred Loving's precise racial background is not fully clear. Most sources describe her as black, but she denied being black and often said she was Native American. See the Plaintiffs section for details.) In 1959, the Lovings were convicted of violating Virginia's Racial Integrity Act of 1924, which criminalized marriage between people classified as "white" and people classified as "colored". Caroline County circuit court judge Leon M. Bazile sentenced the Lovings to prison but suspended their sentences on the condition that they leave Virginia and not return. The Lovings filed a motion to vacate their convictions on the ground that the Racial Integrity Act was unconstitutional, but Bazile denied it. After unsuccessfully appealing to the Supreme Court of Virginia, the Lovings appealed to the U.S. Supreme Court, which agreed to hear their case.

In June 1967, the Supreme Court issued a unanimous decision in the Lovings' favor that overturned their convictions and struck down Virginia's Racial Integrity Act as unconstitutional. Virginia had argued before the Court that its law was not a violation of the Equal Protection Clause because the punishment was the same regardless of the offender's race, and therefore it "equally burdened" both whites and non-whites. The Court found that the law nonetheless violated the Equal Protection Clause because it was based solely on "distinctions drawn according to race" and outlawed conduct—namely, that of getting married—that was otherwise generally accepted and that citizens were free to do. The Court's decision ended all race-based legal restrictions on marriage in the United States.

Beginning in 2013, the decision was cited as precedent in U.S. federal court decisions ruling that restrictions on same-sex marriage in the United States were unconstitutional, including in the Supreme Court decision Obergefell v. Hodges (2015).

== Background ==
=== Anti-miscegenation laws in the United States ===
Anti-miscegenation laws had been in place in most states since the colonial period. During the Reconstruction era in 1865, the Black Codes across the seven states of the lower South made interracial marriage illegal. The new Republican (led by mostly black legislators) legislatures in six states repealed the restrictive laws. However Georgia passed a constitutional amendment in 1866 banning interracial marriage which was upheld in 1869 in Scott vs Georgia. Indiana had a similar court case in 1871 (State vs Gibson) upholding its ban on interracial marriage. By 1894, when the Democratic Party in the South returned to power, restrictions were reimposed. In 1967, 16 states retained anti-miscegenation laws, mainly in the American South.

A major concern was how to draw the line between black and white in a society in which white men had many children with enslaved black women. On the one hand, a person's reputation as black or white was usually what mattered in practice. On the other hand, most laws used a "one drop of blood" rule, which meant that one black ancestor made a person black in the view of the law.

=== Plaintiffs ===
Mildred Delores Loving was the daughter of Musial (Byrd) Jeter and Theoliver Jeter. She self-identified as Indian-Rappahannock, but was also reported as being of Cherokee, Portuguese, and black American ancestry. During the trial, it seemed clear that she identified herself as Black, and her lawyer claimed that was how she described herself to him. However, upon her arrest, the police report identified her as "Indian" and by 2004, she denied having any Black ancestry.

Richard Perry Loving was a white man, the son of Lola (Allen) Loving and Twillie Loving. Their families both lived in Caroline County, Virginia, which adhered to strict Jim Crow segregation laws, but their town of Central Point had been a visible mixed-race community since the 19th century. Mildred became pregnant, and in June 1958, the couple traveled to Washington, D.C. in order to marry. A few weeks after they returned to Central Point, local police raided their home in the early morning hours of July 11, 1958, hoping to find them having sex, as interracial sex was also illegal in Virginia. When the officers found the Lovings sleeping in their bed, Mildred pointed out their marriage certificate on the bedroom wall. They were told the certificate was not valid in Virginia.

== Criminal proceedings ==
The Lovings were charged under Section 20-58 of the Virginia Code, which prohibited interracial couples from being married out of state and then returning to Virginia, and Section 20-59, which classified miscegenation as a felony, punishable by a prison sentence of between one and five years. On January 6, 1959, the Lovings pleaded guilty to "cohabiting as man and wife, against the peace and dignity of the Commonwealth". They were sentenced to one year in prison, with the sentence suspended on condition that the couple leave Virginia and not return together for at least 25 years. After their conviction, the couple moved to the District of Columbia.

=== Appellate proceedings ===
In 1963, frustrated by their inability to travel together to visit their families in Virginia, as well as their social isolation and financial difficulties in Washington, Mildred Loving wrote in protest to Attorney General Robert F. Kennedy. Kennedy referred her to the American Civil Liberties Union (ACLU). The ACLU assigned volunteer cooperating attorneys Bernard S. Cohen and Philip J. Hirschkop, who filed a motion on behalf of the Lovings in Virginia's Caroline County Circuit Court, that requested the court to vacate the criminal judgments and set aside the Lovings' sentences on the grounds that the Virginia miscegenation statutes ran counter to the Fourteenth Amendment's Equal Protection Clause.

On October 28, 1964, after waiting almost a year for a response to their motion, the ACLU attorneys filed a federal class action lawsuit in the U.S. District Court for the Eastern District of Virginia. This prompted the county court judge in the case, Leon M. Bazile (1890–1967), to issue a ruling on the long-pending motion to vacate. Echoing Johann Friedrich Blumenbach's 18th-century interpretation of race, Bazile denied the motion with the words:

Almighty God created the races white, black, yellow, malay and red, and he placed them on separate continents. And but for the interference with his arrangement there would be no cause for such marriages. The fact that he separated the races shows that he did not intend for the races to mix.

— Judge Leon Maurice Nelson Bazile, excerpt from the criminal ruling against the Lovings (January 22, 1965), from the Encyclopedia Virginia (November 28, 2016)

On January 22, 1965, a three-judge district court panel postponed decision on the federal class-action case while the Lovings appealed Judge Bazile's decision on constitutional grounds to the Virginia Supreme Court. On March 7, 1966, Justice Harry L. Carrico (later Chief Justice of the Court) wrote an opinion for the court upholding the constitutionality of the anti-miscegenation statutes. Carrico cited as authority the Virginia Supreme Court's decision in Naim v. Naim (1955) and ruled that criminalization of the Lovings' marriage was not a violation of the Equal Protection Clause because both the white and the non-white spouse were punished equally for miscegenation, a line of reasoning that echoed that of the United States Supreme Court in 1883 in Pace v. Alabama.

The Court found the Lovings' sentences to be unconstitutionally vague, ordering that they be resentenced in the Caroline County Circuit Court. The Lovings, still supported by the ACLU, appealed the state supreme court's decision to the Supreme Court of the United States, where Virginia was represented by Robert McIlwaine of the state's attorney general's office. The Supreme Court agreed on December 12, 1966, to accept the case for final review. The Lovings did not attend the oral arguments in Washington, but one of their lawyers, Bernard S. Cohen, conveyed the personal message he had been given by Richard Loving: "Mr. Cohen, tell the Court I love my wife, and it is just unfair that I can't live with her in Virginia."

== Precedents ==
Date range when U.S. states repealed anti-miscegenation laws: No laws ever passed 1780 to 1887 1948 to 1967 Invalidated June 12, 1967, by Loving decision

Before Loving v. Virginia, there had been several cases on the subject of interracial sexual relations. Within the state of Virginia, on October 3, 1878, in Kinney v. The Commonwealth, the Supreme Court of Virginia ruled that the marriage legalized in Washington, D.C. between Andrew Kinney, a black man, and Mahala Miller, a white woman, was "invalid" in Virginia. In the national case of Pace v. Alabama (1883), the Supreme Court of the United States ruled that the conviction of an Alabama couple for interracial sex, affirmed on appeal by the Alabama Supreme Court, did not violate the Fourteenth Amendment. Interracial marital sex was deemed a felony, whereas extramarital sex ("adultery or fornication") was only a misdemeanor.

On appeal, the United States Supreme Court ruled that the criminalization of interracial sex was not a violation of the Equal Protection Clause because whites and non-whites were punished in equal measure for the offense of engaging in interracial sex. The court did not need to affirm the constitutionality of the ban on interracial marriage that was also part of Alabama's anti-miscegenation law, since the plaintiff, Mr. Pace, had chosen not to appeal that section of the law. After Pace v. Alabama, the constitutionality of anti-miscegenation laws banning marriage and sex between whites and non-whites remained unchallenged until the 1920s.

In Kirby v. Kirby (1921), Joe R. Kirby asked the state of Arizona for an annulment of his marriage. He charged that his marriage was invalid because his wife was of "negro" descent, thus violating the state's anti-miscegenation law. The Arizona Supreme Court judged Mayellen Kirby's race by observing her physical characteristics and determined that she was of mixed race, therefore granting Joe R. Kirby's annulment. Roldan v. Los Angeles County (1933), 129 Cal. App. 267, 18 P.2d 706, was a 1930s court case in California confirming that the state's anti-miscegenation laws at the time did not bar the marriage of a Filipino and a white person. However, the precedent lasted barely a week before the law was specifically amended to illegalize such marriages.

In the Monks case (Estate of Monks, 4. Civ. 2835, Records of California Court of Appeals, Fourth district), the Superior Court of San Diego County in 1939 decided to invalidate the marriage of Marie Antoinette and Allan Monks because she was deemed to have "one eighth negro blood". The court case involved a legal challenge over the conflicting wills that had been left by the late Allan Monks; an old one in favor of a friend named Ida Lee, and a newer one in favor of his wife. Lee's lawyers charged that the marriage of the Monkses, which had taken place in Arizona, was invalid under Arizona state law because Marie Antoinette was "a Negro" and Alan had been white. Despite conflicting testimony by various expert witnesses, the judge defined Marie Antoinette Monks' race by relying on the anatomical "expertise" of a surgeon. The judge ignored the arguments of an anthropologist and a biologist that it was impossible to tell a person's race from physical characteristics.

Monks then challenged the Arizona anti-miscegenation law itself, taking her case to the California Court of Appeals, Fourth District. Monks' lawyers pointed out that the anti-miscegenation law effectively prohibited Monks as a mixed-race person from marrying anyone: "As such, she is prohibited from marrying a negro or any descendant of a negro, a Mongolian or an Indian, a Malay or a Hindu, or any descendants of any of them. Likewise ... as a descendant of a negro she is prohibited from marrying a Caucasian or a descendant of a Caucasian." The Arizona anti-miscegenation statute thus prohibited Monks from contracting a valid marriage in Arizona and was therefore an unconstitutional constraint on her liberty. However, the court dismissed this argument as inapplicable, because the case presented involved not two mixed-race spouses but a mixed-race and a white spouse: "Under the facts presented the appellant does not have the benefit of assailing the validity of the statute." Dismissing Monks' appeal in 1942, the United States Supreme Court refused to reopen the issue. The turning point came with Perez v. Sharp (1948), also known as Perez v. Lippold. In Perez, the Supreme Court of California ruled that California's ban on interracial marriage violated the Fourteenth Amendment of the Federal Constitution.

== Supreme Court decision ==
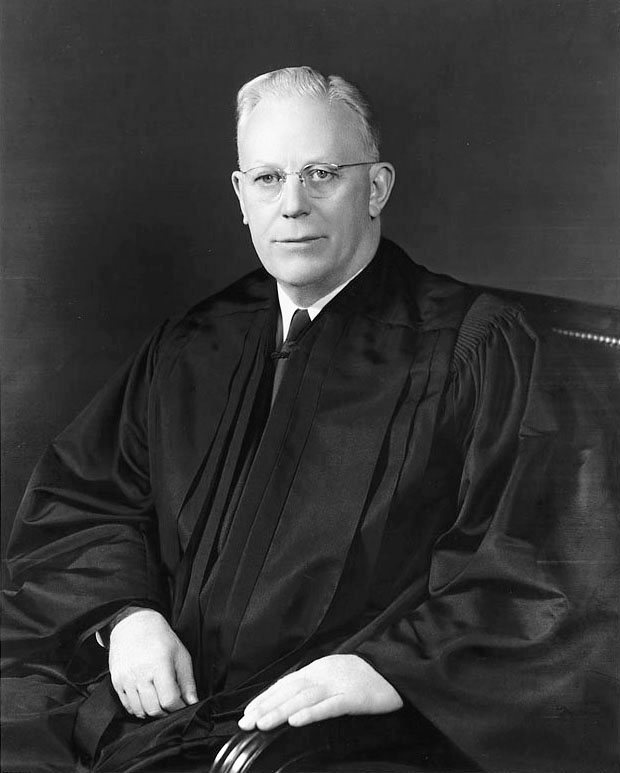
Chief Justice Earl Warren, the author of the Supreme Court's unanimous opinion in Loving v. Virginia

On June 12, 1967, the Supreme Court issued a unanimous 9–0 decision in favor of the Lovings. The Court's opinion was written by Chief Justice Earl Warren, and all the justices joined it. (Note: The decision also includes a very short concurring opinion—only two sentences long—written by justice Potter Stewart. Stewart wrote that, in his opinion, no state criminal law could be valid "which makes the criminality of an act depend upon the race of the actor" (as he wrote in his concurrence in McLaughlin v. Florida, a similar case in 1964), a standard which reflects justice John Marshall Harlan's dissent in 1896's Plessy v. Ferguson.) The Court first addressed whether Virginia's Racial Integrity Act violated the Equal Protection Clause of the Fourteenth Amendment, which reads: "nor shall any State ... deny to any person within its jurisdiction the equal protection of the laws." Virginia state officials had argued that the Act did not violate the Equal Protection Clause because it "equally burdened" both whites and non-whites, reasoning that the punishment for violating the statute was the same regardless of the offender's race; for example, a white person who married a black person was subject to the same penalties as a black person who married a white person. The Court had accepted this "equal application" argument 84 years earlier in its 1883 decision Pace v. Alabama, but it rejected the argument in Loving.

[W]e reject the notion that the mere "equal application" of a statute containing racial classifications is enough to remove the classifications from the Fourteenth Amendment's proscription of all invidious racial discriminations ....

... We have rejected the proposition that the debates in the Thirty-ninth Congress or in the state legislatures which ratified the Fourteenth Amendment supported the theory advanced by the State [of Virginia], that the requirement of equal protection of the laws is satisfied by penal laws defining offenses based on racial classifications so long as white and Negro participants in the offense were similarly punished.

The State finds support for its "equal application" theory in the decision of the Court in Pace v. Alabama. ... However, as recently as the 1964 Term, in rejecting the reasoning of that case, we stated "Pace represents a limited view of the Equal Protection Clause which has not withstood analysis in the subsequent decisions of this Court."

— Loving, 388 U.S. at 8, 10 (citations omitted).

The Court said that because Virginia's Racial Integrity Act used race as a basis to impose criminal punishment, the Equal Protection Clause required the Court to apply strict scrutiny to the constitutionality of the Act:

There can be no question but that Virginia's miscegenation statutes rest solely upon distinctions drawn according to race. The statutes proscribe generally accepted conduct if engaged in by members of different races. Over the years, this Court has consistently repudiated "[d]istinctions between citizens solely because of their ancestry" as being "odious to a free people whose institutions are founded upon the doctrine of equality." At the very least, the Equal Protection Clause demands that racial classifications, especially suspect in criminal statutes, be subjected to the "most rigid scrutiny."

— Loving, 388 U.S. at 11 (alteration in original) (citations omitted).

After reviewing the Act, the Court concluded it had no purpose other than "invidious racial discrimination" and "maintain[ing] white supremacy." It therefore held that the Act violated the Equal Protection Clause and was unconstitutional:

There is patently no legitimate overriding purpose independent of invidious racial discrimination which justifies this classification. The fact that Virginia prohibits only interracial marriages involving white persons demonstrates that the racial classifications must stand on their own justification, as measures designed to maintain White Supremacy. We have consistently denied the constitutionality of measures which restrict the rights of citizens on account of race. There can be no doubt that restricting the freedom to marry solely because of racial classifications violates the central meaning of the Equal Protection Clause.

— Loving, 388 U.S. at 11–12.

The Court ended its opinion with a short section holding that Virginia's Racial Integrity Act also violated the Fourteenth Amendment's Due Process Clause. The Court said that the freedom to marry is a fundamental constitutional right, and it held that depriving Americans of it on an arbitrary basis such as race was unconstitutional:

These statutes also deprive the Lovings of liberty without due process of law in violation of the Due Process Clause of the Fourteenth Amendment. The freedom to marry has long been recognized as one of the vital personal rights essential to the orderly pursuit of happiness by free men.
Marriage is one of the "basic civil rights of man," fundamental to our very existence and survival. To deny this fundamental freedom on so unsupportable a basis as the racial classifications embodied in these statutes, classifications so directly subversive of the principle of equality at the heart of the Fourteenth Amendment, is surely to deprive all the State's citizens of liberty without due process of law.

— Loving, 388 U.S. at 12 (citations omitted).

The Court ended by ordering that the Lovings' convictions be reversed.

== Effects ==
=== For interracial marriage ===
Despite the Supreme Court's decision, anti-miscegenation laws remained on the books in several states, although the decision had made them unenforceable. State judges in Alabama continued to enforce its anti-miscegenation statute until 1970, when the Nixon administration obtained a ruling from a U.S. District Court in United States v. Brittain. In 2000, Alabama became the last state to adapt its laws to the Supreme Court's decision, when 60% of voters endorsed a constitutional amendment, Amendment 2, that removed anti-miscegenation language from the state constitution. After Loving v. Virginia, the number of interracial marriages continued to increase across the United States and in the South. In Georgia, for instance, the number of interracial marriages increased from 21 in 1967 to 115 in 1970. At the national level, 0.4% of marriages were interracial in 1960, 2.0% in 1980, 12% in 2013, and 16% in 2015, almost 50 years after Loving.

=== For same-sex marriage ===
Loving v. Virginia was discussed in the context of the public debate about same-sex marriage in the United States. In Hernandez v. Robles (2006), the majority opinion of the New York Court of Appeals—that state's highest court—declined to rely on the Loving case when deciding whether a right to same-sex marriage existed, holding that "the historical background of Loving is different from the history underlying this case." In the 2010 federal district court decision in Perry v. Schwarzenegger, overturning California's Proposition 8 which restricted marriage to opposite-sex couples, Judge Vaughn R. Walker cited Loving v. Virginia to conclude that "the [constitutional] right to marry protects an individual's choice of marital partner regardless of gender". On narrower grounds, the 9th Circuit Court of Appeals affirmed.

In June 2007, on the 40th anniversary of the Supreme Court's decision in Loving, Mildred Loving issued a statement in support of same-sex marriage. Up until 2014, five U.S. Courts of Appeals considered the constitutionality of state bans on same-sex marriage. In doing so they interpreted or used the Loving ruling differently:

- The Fourth and Tenth Circuits used Loving along with other cases like Zablocki v. Redhail and Turner v. Safley to demonstrate that the U.S. Supreme Court has recognized a "fundamental right to marry" that a state cannot restrict unless it meets the court's "heightened scrutiny" standard. Using that standard, both courts struck down state bans on same-sex marriage.
- Two other courts of appeals, the Seventh and Ninth Circuits, struck down state bans on the basis of a different line of argument. Instead of "fundamental rights" analysis, they reviewed bans on same-sex marriage as discrimination on the basis of sexual orientation. The former cited Loving to demonstrate that the Supreme Court did not accept tradition as a justification for limiting access to marriage. The latter cited Loving as quoted in United States v. Windsor on the question of federalism: "state laws defining or regulating marriage, of course, must respect the constitutional rights of persons".
- The only Court of Appeals to uphold state bans on same-sex marriage, the Sixth Circuit, said that when the Loving decision discussed marriage it was referring only to marriage between persons of the opposite sex.

In Obergefell v. Hodges (2015), the Supreme Court invoked Loving, among other cases, as precedent for its holding that states are required to allow same-sex marriages under both the Equal Protection Clause and the Due Process Clause of the Constitution. The court's decision in Obergefell cited Loving nearly a dozen times, and was based on the same principles – equality and an unenumerated right to marriage. During oral argument, the eventual author of the majority opinion, Justice Anthony Kennedy, noted that the ruling holding racial segregation unconstitutional and the ruling holding bans on interracial marriage unconstitutional (Brown v. Board of Education in 1954 and Loving v. Virginia in 1967, respectively) were made about 13 years apart, much like the ruling holding bans on same-sex sexual activity unconstitutional and the eventual ruling holding bans on same-sex marriage unconstitutional (Lawrence v. Texas in 2003 and Obergefell v. Hodges in 2015, respectively).

== Codification ==
In 2022, Congress codified portions of the Supreme Court's decisions in Loving and Obergefell in federal law by passing the Respect for Marriage Act. This act requires the U.S. federal government and all U.S. states and territories (though not tribes) to recognize the validity of same-sex and interracial civil marriages in the United States.

== In popular culture ==
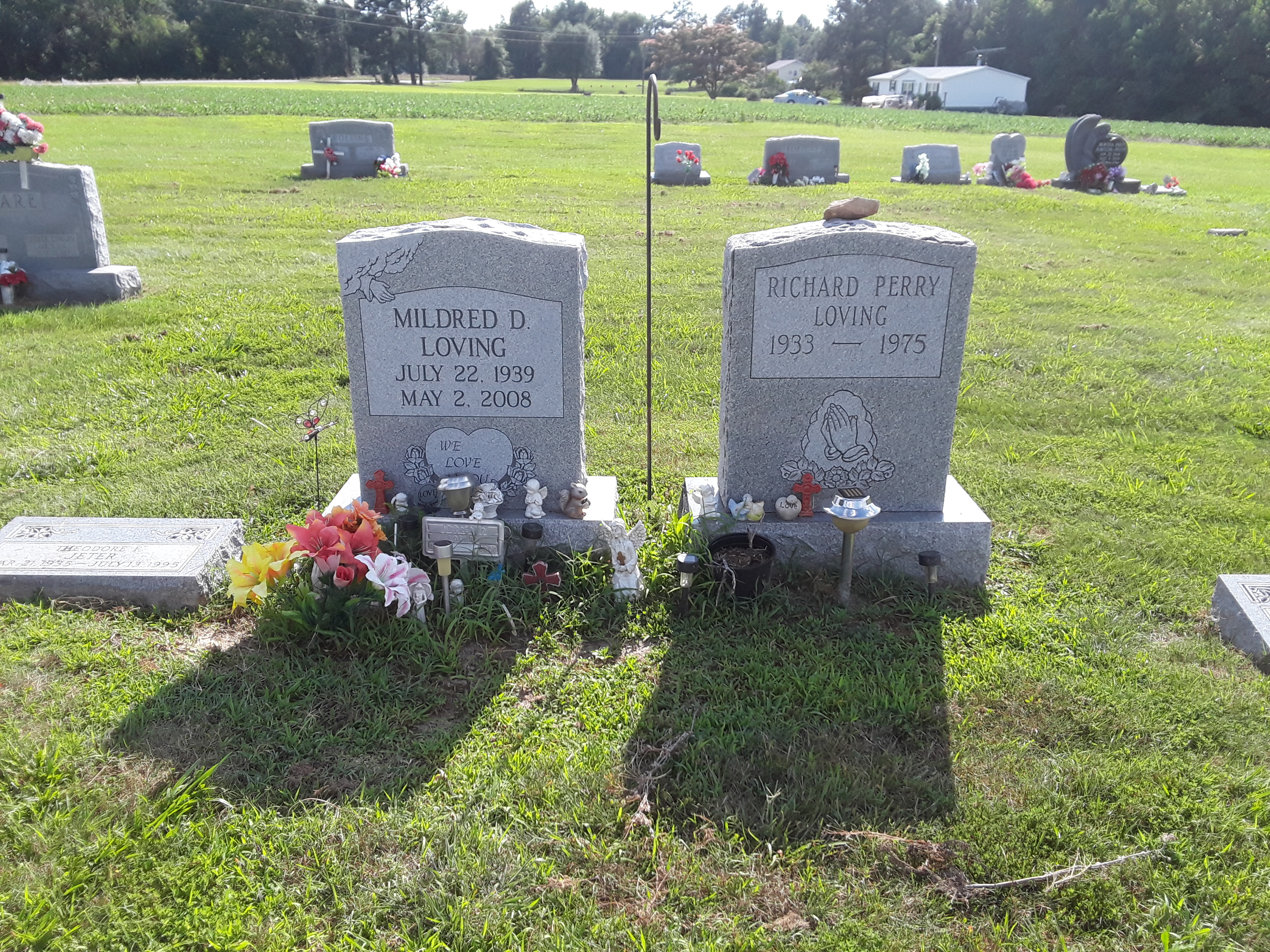
Graves of the Lovings in the St. Stephen's Baptist Church cemetery, Central Point, Virginia

In the United States, June 12, the date of the decision, has become known as Loving Day, an annual unofficial celebration of interracial marriages. In 2014, Mildred Loving was honored as one of the Library of Virginia's "Virginia Women in History". In 2017, the Virginia Department of Historic Resources dedicated a state historical marker, which tells the story of the Lovings, outside the Patrick Henry Building in Richmond – the former site of the Virginia Supreme Court of Appeals.

The story of the Lovings became the basis of several films:

- The first, Mr. and Mrs. Loving (1996), was written and directed by Richard Friedenberg and starred Lela Rochon, Timothy Hutton, and Ruby Dee. According to Mildred Loving, "not much of it was very true. The only part of it right was I had three children."
- Nancy Buirski's documentary The Loving Story, premiered on HBO in February 2012, and won a Peabody Award that year.
- Loving, a dramatized telling of the story based on Buirski's documentary, was released in 2016. It was directed by Jeff Nichols and starred Ruth Negga and Joel Edgerton as the Lovings. Negga received an Academy Award nomination for her performance.
- A four-part film, The Loving Generation, premiered on Topic.com in February 2018. Directed and produced by Lacey Schwartz Delgado and Mehret Mandefro, it explores the lives of biracial children born after the Loving decision.

In music, Nanci Griffith's 2009 album The Loving Kind is named for the Lovings and includes a song about them. Satirist Roy Zimmerman's 2009 song "The Summer of Loving" (the title is a reference to the Summer of Love) is about the Lovings and their 1967 case. A 2015 novel by the French journalist Gilles Biassette, L'amour des Loving ("The Love of the Lovings", ISBN 978-2917559598), recounts the life of the Lovings and their case. A photo-essay about the couple by Grey Villet, created just before the case, was republished in 2017. The opera Loving v Virginia by Damien Geter and Jessica Murphy Moo premiered in the spring of 2025 with Virginia Opera and The Richmond Symphony.
