= Central Point, Virginia =

Unincorporated community in Virginia, United States

- Unincorporated area
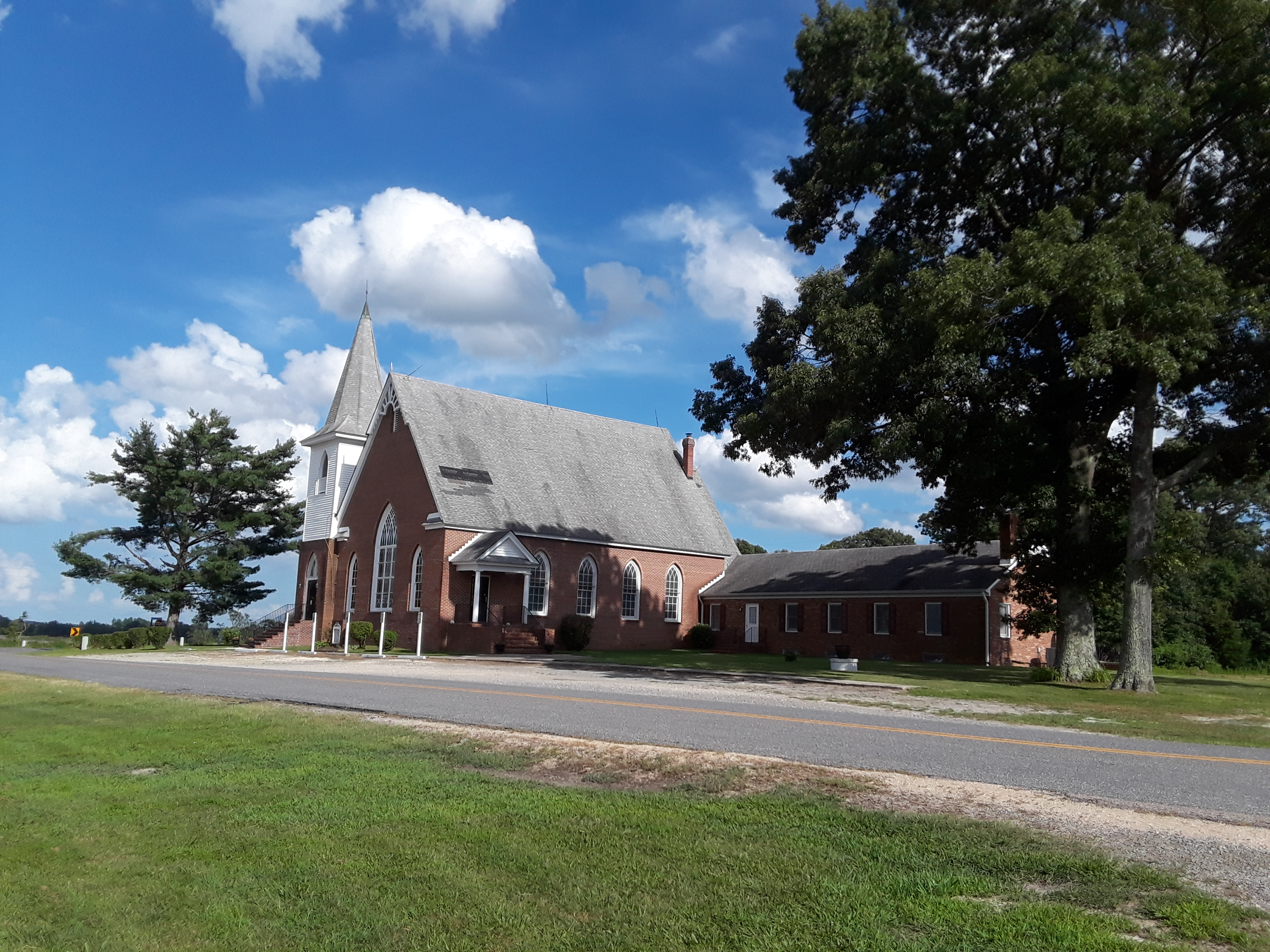
- St. Stephen's Baptist Church in Central Point

- Location in Virginia Location in the contiguous United States
- Coordinates: 37°59′20″N 77°07′56″W
- Country: United States
- State: Virginia
- County: Caroline
- Time zone: UTC−5 (Eastern (EST))
  - Summer (DST): UTC−4 (EDT)

Central Point is an unincorporated community in Caroline County, in the U.S. state of Virginia.

== History ==
=== Loving v. Virginia ===
Richard Loving and Mildred Jeter grew up in Central Point. He was white and she was Rappahannock and African American in ancestry, identifying as Indian (a classification the state disallowed under its binary system of "white" or "colored"). In this small community people shared their lives and work, and the couple fell in love. In 1958 they married in Washington, D.C., but returned here to live, thus violating state law against interracial marriages. They were arrested and charged, and forced to leave the state for 25 years to avoid being jailed. They moved to Washington, D.C., but challenged the law, as they wanted to go home. Their case reached the US Supreme Court, where in Loving v. Virginia (1967), the state's anti-miscegenation law was overturned for violating the Fourteenth Amendment, which protects due process and equal rights under the law.
