= Grey Villet =

"Life" magazine photographer

- Grey Villet in 1956
- Born: Charles Grey Villet; August 16, 1927; Beaufort West, South Africa
- Died: February 2, 2000 (aged 72); Shushan, New York
- Occupation: Magazine photographer
- Known for: Photographic assignments for Life magazine
- Notable work: "The Crime of Being Married"; "The Lash of Success"

Grey Villet (1927–2000) was an American photojournalist of South African origin. He was "Magazine Photographer of the Year" in the United States in 1956. Employed by Life, his notable work included photographs of the Cuban Revolution at the end of 1958, and of Mildred and Richard Loving, who successfully challenged the State of Virginia’s law against interracial marriage in the Supreme Court of the United States.

== Early life ==
Charles De Gouret Villet was born on 16 August 1927 in Beaufort West, in the Western Cape province of South Africa. The family later moved to Cape Town where his father, who was a doctor, persuaded Villet to study medicine at the University of Cape Town. However, he discovered a passion for photography and convinced his father to let him move to England to train as a photographer. Initially working as a wedding photographer outside a Civil Registry, he obtained a job with the Bristol Evening Post and then moved to London to work for Reuters. Returning to South Africa at the age of 24 he was employed by The Star of Johannesburg, but resigned following criticisms from management about his disheveled appearance.

== Life magazine ==
After resigning from The Star, Villet moved to New York City, where he applied to Life magazine in 1954. Sent on a test assignment by the magazine's picture editor, he produced a photograph of 42nd Street and 5th Avenue taken from the 55th floor of a skyscraper, in which his feet, hanging over a ledge, appear in the foreground. He got the job and would go on to work for Life until it closed down in 1972. In 1956, just two years after his arrival in the USA, he was made the National Press Photographers Association (NPPA) and the Encyclopædia Britannica "Magazine Photographer of the Year". He would go on to win many other NPPA and World Press Photo awards, becoming known for his fly on the wall approach.

Early assignments by Villet for Life included one on work to control erosion at the Niagara Falls and another on the completion of a dam on the Missouri River. Among other assignments in 1955 was the Baseball World Series between the New York Yankees and their New York rivals the Brooklyn Dodgers. In 1957 he, and other photographers and reporters, was assaulted in Little Rock, Arkansas, while covering protests following the Federal Government's attempts to desegregate public schools. After being attacked by segregationists he was arrested by the police and held for a few hours on unspecified charges. Two reports by Life in January 1959 recorded the success of communists in Cuba led by Fidel Castro in finally overthrowing the dictatorship of Fulgencio Batista. Villet was present in Cuba during the last days of the revolution and, for a time, accompanied Castro in the back of his car as he drove into Havana surrounded by his supporters. In 1962 Villet visited the controversial Synanon House drug rehabilitation center in Santa Monica, California, and produced a feature called A Tunnel Back into the Human Race.

In 1961, Barbara Cummiskey, a writer for Life, had the idea of writing three essays about the myths associated with the American dream, i.e. fame, success and wealth. For the "success" segment she developed the story around Victor Sabatino, who owned a chain of foam-rubber stores and was driven by a desire for wealth and power, while "sacrificing his humanity in pursuit of success". Villet was assigned to the story, to be titled the Lash of Success. This resulted in a report that was highly regarded both at the time of publication and subsequently. Writing in The New York Times, Stephen Crowley, also a photographer, said that his appreciation for this work led to a bit of Grey Villet DNA being in every one of his own photos. According to Mary Panzer, Villet got “an almost unthinkable proximity” to his subjects, bringing "viewers uncomfortably near them" by spending several weeks with Sabatino and "melting into the woodwork". The article was reproduced in the 1978 publication Great Photographic Essays from Life. Villet considered it his best work.

In March 1966, Life published photos by Villet of Mildred and Richard Loving, an interracial couple who were sentenced at the end of the 1950s for violating Virginia's laws prohibiting mixed marriages. Married in the District of Columbia in 1958 they had not realized that their marriage was illegal in Virginia and were only able to avoid imprisonment by agreeing to leave the state. After a lengthy legal battle, the Supreme Court found unanimously in their favor in 1967. Villet was assigned to the story in 1965 and spent two weeks with the Lovings. However, Life held the story and only published it in 1966. Despite the eventual Supreme Court finding interracial marriage was a sensitive issue at the time, with only 4 percent of the population approving such relationships.

Most of the photographs that Villet took while with the Lovings and their children only came to public attention in 2011. In that year the filmmaker, Nancy Buirski, made a documentary on the couple, called The Loving Story. Villet had given many of the photos to the Lovings and their daughter shared them with Buirski. His photographs were then exhibited in 2012 at an exhibition also called The Loving Story, held at the International Center of Photography in New York City. The documentary and Villet's stills then inspired the film director Jeff Nichols to make the movie Loving, which came out in 2016. In this movie Villet was played by the actor Michael Shannon. Barbara Villet subsequently issued the photographs in book form as The Lovings: An Intimate Portrait.

== Personal life ==
Villet married twice. With his first wife, American journalist Chiquita Villet (née Alfau), who he met in South Africa, he had a son and a daughter. They divorced in Los Angeles, where Villet had been posted by Life. He met Life journalist Barbara Cummiskey, one of the magazine's few female writers, while working on the Lash of Success assignment. They subsequently married and had one daughter.

Life was published weekly until 1972. After that it ceased to be viable and was published as an intermittent "special" until 1978, and as a monthly from 1978 until 2000. After the magazine effectively folded in 1972, Villet was ill for some time as he tried to adapt to being unable to continue doing his work. He and his wife bought an Airstream trailer and traveled to Mexico. Villet did no photography but occupied himself doing wood carvings. On their return home to New York State, he worked in house construction while she sold real estate. They also produced books together. One, on South African history, entitled Blood River, was named a New York Times Notable Book of the Year in 1980 and nominated for a Pulitzer Prize.

Villet died on February 2, 2000, in Shushan, New York. After his death Barbara Villet managed his professional estate and organized further exhibitions of his work.

== Selected assignments for Life ==
- Man vs. River Above Niagara, 11 October, 1954
- The Big Muddy tamed at last, 22 August 1955
- The Ball Park is a Big Factor, by Joe Dimaggio, 10 October 1955
- Arrest in Little Rock, Arkansas, 7 October 1957
- Fidel Castro Moves out of the Wilderness, 10 January 1959
- Liberator’s Triumphal March, 19 January 1959
- A Tunnel Back to the Human Race, 9 Mar 1962
- The Crime of Being Married, 18 March 1966
- The Lash of Success, 16 November 1962
- The Bitter Years of Slavery, 22 November 1968

== Publications ==
- Those whom God chooses (Barbara and Grey Villet) 1966.
- Blood River: The Passionate Saga of South Africa's Afrikaners and of Life in their Embattled Land (Barbara Villet text; Grey Villet photos) 1982.
- The Lovings: An Intimate Portrait (Grey Villet photos; Barbara Villet text; Stephen Crowley Foreword) 2017.
