= Philip Hirschkop =

American civil rights lawyer

- Hirschkop at Politics and Prose in 2026
- Born: Philip Jay Hirschkop; 14 May 1936 (age 90); Brooklyn, New York, U.S.
- Education: Columbia University (AB, BSME); Georgetown University (JD)
- Occupation: Civil rights lawyer
- Years active: 1964–present
- Known for: Lead counsel in Loving v. Virginia
- Awards: Honorary Doctor of Laws (Georgetown Law, 2024); Distinguished Achievement Award (ASA)

Philip Jay Hirschkop (born May 14, 1936) is an American civil rights lawyer. With fellow American Civil Liberties Union (ACLU) volunteer cooperating attorney Bernard S. Cohen, the two represented Mildred and Richard Loving in several court cases to overturn the Lovings' conviction for interracial marriage in the state of Virginia. The case eventually reached the United States Supreme Court, and on April 10, 1967, Hirschkop and Cohen were permitted to share the oral argument for the Lovings. In a landmark decision, the Supreme Court ruled unanimously in favor of the Lovings in Loving v. Virginia, overturning their conviction and ending the enforcement of state bans on interracial marriage.

Hirschkop went on to argue two additional cases before the Supreme Court in the 1970s. Other clients have included Martin Luther King Jr., H. Rap Brown, Norman Mailer, the American Nazi Party, PETA, and "numerous anti-war protesters during the 1960s and 1970s." Hirschkop has served on the ACLU's national Board of Directors and as Chair of the ACLU of Virginia, which he helped found in 1969. He also served as executive director of the Penal Reform Institute. He has been a member of the Virginia State and Washington D.C. bars. In the 1960s, after the McCarthy era, he served as the vice chair of the National Committee to Abolish the House Un-American Activities Committee, which now is the Defending Dissent Foundation.

== Early life and influences ==
Philip Hirschkop was born May 14, 1936, in Brooklyn, New York, the youngest of three boys in an Orthodox Jewish family. In his youth, his family relocated from Brooklyn to the safer Hightstown, New Jersey, where he attended a small high school. In Hightstown, he made friends with a number of African American migrant workers who briefly lived there as they passed through town while working in the potato fields, often under terrible conditions. He saw them often as they shopped in his father's clothing shop. He attributed "his passion for social justice" to meeting the workers in his childhood.

Immediately after high school, at the age of eighteen, Hirschkop joined the Army as a Green Beret in the 77th Special Forces Air Group as a paratrooper.

After the army, he attended Columbia University. While in law school in the evenings at Georgetown University, he used his Mechanical Engineering degree from Columbia to work days as an examiner in the US Patent and Trademark office, though he soon discovered that a career in patent law would not stimulate him.While still in law school at Georgetown, he attended a party with a number of African-American civil rights lawyers assembled by President Kennedy and was greatly influenced. Not long after, he met the prominent civil rights attorney William Kunstler, who mentored him throughout his early career. On a trip to Danville, Virginia, to defend protestors, he witnessed what he described as "one of the worst beatings of black people ever seen in the south". Over fifty were hospitalized. He later claimed that experience made him a civil rights lawyer. Not long after, he traveled to Mississippi to fight for voting rights, and to help investigate the infamous "Mississippi Burning" murders of three civil rights workers in 1964.

== Loving v. Virginia, 1967 ==
U.S States, by the date of repeal of anti-miscegenation laws: No laws passed 1780 to 1887 1948 to 1967 After 1967

On April 10, 1967, only a few years out of law school, Hirschkop argued as a volunteer cooperating attorney for the ACLUon behalf of the petitioners Richard and Mildred Loving in the case of Loving v. Virginia before the Supreme Court of the United States. Hirschkop's co-counsel was fellow Virginian Bernard S. Cohen, who had also recently completed law school at Georgetown.

Richard Loving was a white construction worker, and Mildred was of both black and native American origins according to her attorneys, though in 2004 she claimed Indian-Rappahannock and not African ethnic origins.They were married in Washington, D.C., in 1958, and after returning to their home in Caroline County, Virginia, six weeks after their marriage, they were arrested and charged with violating interracial marriage laws, a felony carrying one to five years. On the day of their wedding, twenty-four states banned interracial marriage. The couple were sentenced to one year in prison, but their sentence was suspended on condition that they leave the state for 25 years. At one point according to attorney Hirschkop, Mildred, though five months pregnant and the mother of a young child, was held in a small dirty jail cell for the better part of a month.After the passing of the Civil Rights Act of 1964, Mildred wrote Attorney General Robert F. Kennedy, inquiring if the law could allow her and her husband to live in Virginia. Kennedy forwarded the letter to the ACLU office in Washington.

On June 12, 1967, the Supreme Court rendered its unanimous decision overturning a Virginia State Supreme Court of Appeals ruling in favor of the state to create and enforce interracial marriage laws known as anti-miscegenation laws. The decision validated that interracial marriage bans were unconstitutional and their existence in some states and not others denied the couple equal protection under the law guaranteed by the Constitution's Fourteenth Amendment. Most significantly, it reversed the right of states to create laws that banned interracial marriage or enforce such laws where they existed.

On February 17, 2017, the General Assembly of Virginia passed a resolution commending Philip Hirschkop and his co-counsel Bernard S. Cohen, lauding their work on Loving. On June 26, 2021, Hirschkop was interviewed and spoke in detail about the case, which video presentation is available online.

=== Effect of the Supreme Court ruling in Loving v. Virginia ===
The Supreme Court ruling voided the existing interracial marriage laws of 15 mostly Southern states, including all the states of the former Confederacy. A few states, notably Alabama, continued to have bans on interracial marriage on the books, though they could no longer be enforced. Alabama did not officially reverse its ban on interracial marriage until 2000 in a special election that struck the mention of anti-miscegenation from the state constitution. In violation of the Loving ruling, it continued to enforce its laws banning interracial marriage until 1970.

== Other legal cases of note ==
In 1967, in Koehl v. Resor, Hirschkop successfully argued for the right of American Nazi Party activist George Lincoln Rockwell, as a veteran, to be buried in Arlington National Cemetery. He initially declined the case, in light of the client's activities and beliefs, but Hirschkop's associates at the ACLU encouraged him to take it to defend free speech, regardless of content. The case brought great resentment from his parents and others in the Jewish community.

In 1971, he defended 19 year old Leslie Bacon, a woman suspected of participating in or having knowledge of a bombing that occurred at the United States Capitol on March 1 of that year.

=== Work defending Vietnam war protesters ===
In 1968, he defended Norman Mailer, distinguished author, against charges of disorderly conduct when he crossed a police line in a Vietnam war demonstration at the Pentagon in October 1967. Hirschkkop had difficulty overturning the ruling requiring Mailer to serve five days in prison and pay a fine. Hirschkop defended other celebrities who faced arrest as a result of participation in Vietnam war protests.

In May 1971, he served as chief legal advisor to Vietnam war protestors who numbered over 10,000 and had been arrested during capital protests. Many, in his opinion, had been arrested unjustly, and he was concerned about the length of time it would take them to get released on bail.

In 1975, he defended oil heirs William H. and Nelson B. Hunt against charges of illegal wire tapping. They were acquitted in late September, in a decision that was not entirely popular in Lubbock where it occurred.

=== Work with prison reform ===
In November 1971, he was instrumental in bringing reforms to Virginia prisons which led a federal judge to declare "cruel and unusual punishment" in the state's prisons which included "physical punishment, bread and water diets, mail censorship, interference with access to counsel, and imposition of other penalties without due counsel". For his efforts he was described by one reporter as having helped to enact "the most sweeping court order ever issued for prison reform".

=== Work with women's rights, teachers, and rights to pursue higher education ===
In 1968, Hirschkop represented an amicus party in a U.S. Supreme Court case that declared unconstitutional an Arkansas law that prohibited teachers, in state schools, from teaching Darwin's theory of evolution.

In 1970, he successfully argued Kirstein v. University of Virginia before a federal court in Virginia. At the time the university denied entrance to women, forcing them to attend inferior colleges that prepared them to be teachers. Hirschkop created a massive record, and called on the heads of several Virginia schools to explain why women could not be admitted. By winning the case, he secured the potential for Virginia women to receive a superior education.

In 1971, Hirschkop represented a Virginia teacher, Susan Cohen, in a trial that questioned the "constitutionality of regulations forcing pregnant women to quit their jobs". Hirschkop stated he believed that "most pregnant women can handle teaching chores with no difficulty". When opposition lawyers used medical reasons to keep pregnant women out of the classroom, Hirschkop called medical experts to counter them. The case was argued using the "equal protection clause" of the Fourteenth Amendment. In 1974, he successfully argued the case, Cohen v. Chesterfield County before the U.S. Supreme Court. Consolidated with another case under the caption Cleveland Board of Education v. LaFleur, the 7-2 decision relied on the Fourteenth Amendment's Due Process Clause to invalidate existing teacher leave policies for pregnant women. The ruling abolished laws that required pregnant teachers to take unpaid maternity leave several months prior to their due date. In another landmark ruling for teachers in Johnson v. Branch, he gained one of the earliest decisions that protected teacher's rights to participate in peaceful protest.

=== Late career work with animal rights ===
In August 1990, he was involved in a controversial appeal in which his client PETA, and other animal rights groups were assessed two million dollars in damages on counts of invasion of privacy and defamation of character against a Las Vegas showman who used pet orangutans in his act at the Stardust Hotel.Berosini and the Stardust had successfully sued PETA after the tapes of his striking the animals were leaked to the press. Hirschkop claimed that Bobby Berosini, the showman, had been secretly filmed striking the orangutans in his act, and that he and the hotel should not retain the damage awards they had received for defamation of character in their suit against the animal rights groups.

== Education ==
- Columbia College, A.B., 1960; Columbia University, B.S.M.E., 1961.
- Georgetown University, J.D., 1964.

== Personal life ==
Hirschkop and his wife Phyllis married in 1959. They have two children. Their marriage ended in divorce after 21 years. He has another son from a later relationship.
