= Mr. and Mrs. Loving =

- Genre: Biography; Drama; Romance
- Written by: Richard Friedenberg
- Directed by: Richard Friedenberg
- Starring: Timothy Hutton; Lela Rochon; Ruby Dee; Isaiah Washington
- Music by: Branford Marsalis
- Country of origin: United States
- Original language: English

Production
- Executive producers: Timothy Hutton; Susan Rose
- Producers: Dan Paulson; Chi-en Telemaque
- Running time: 105 minutes

Original release
- Network: Showtime
- Release: March 31, 1996

Mr. and Mrs. Loving is a 1996 drama television film directed by Richard Friedenberg that aired on Showtime. It is based on a true story, but with fictionalized parts.

== Plot summary ==
A racially mixed couple live in Virginia which violates the state's miscegenation laws. Arrested on the night of their wedding, Richard Loving and Mildred “Bean” Jeter are given the option to either be imprisoned or leave the state. The couple chooses to move to Washington, D.C. The Civil Rights Movement and the fight for their marriage led to their win of the Supreme Court case Loving v. Virginia.

== Cast ==
- Timothy Hutton as Richard Loving
- Lela Rochon as Mildred 'Bean' Jeter
- Ruby Dee as Sophia
- Bill Nunn as Leonard
- Corey Parker as Bernie Cohen
- Isaiah Washington as Blue
- Lawrence Dane as Sheriff

== Reception ==
Lisa D. Horowitz, writing for Variety said, "Director-scripter Richard Friedenberg has fashioned a straightforward tale that doesn’t pull any punches. He’s a better writer than helmer, crafting some fine dialogue. But he’s blessed with an excellent cast, led by the reliably understated Hutton". Scott D. Pierce of Deseret News wrote, "Showtime doesn't make a lot of movies worth watching, but Mr. and Mrs. Loving is an exception."

=== Accolades ===
| Association | Year | Category | Nominee | Result | Ref |
|---|---|---|---|---|---|
| CableACE Awards | 1996 | Actress in a Movie or Miniseries | Lela Rochon | Nominated | |

== Accuracy ==
According to Mildred Loving, "not much of it was very true. The only part of it right was I had three children."
