= Nancy Buirski =

American documentary filmmaker and producer (1945–2023)

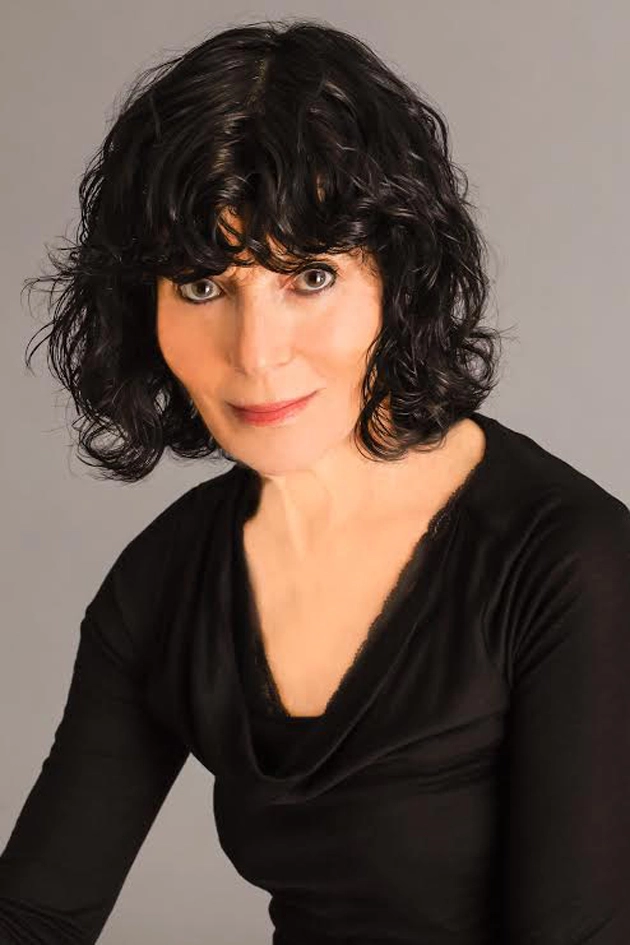
- Born: Nancy Florence Cohen; June 24, 1945; New York City, U.S.
- Died: August 29, 2023 (aged 78); New York City, U.S.
- Occupations: Director, producer, writer, photographer
- Notable work: A Crime on the Bayou; Desperate Souls, Dark City and the Legend of Midnight Cowboy

Nancy Florence Buirski (née Cohen; June 24, 1945 – August 29, 2023) was an American filmmaker, producer, and photographer. She wrote, directed, and produced the documentary films A Crime on the Bayou (2020) and Desperate Souls, Dark City and the Legend of Midnight Cowboy (2022).

== Life ==
Buirski was born in Manhattan to Helen Housten Cohen and Daniel S. Cohen on June 24, 1945. She grew up in New Rochelle, NY. She graduated from Adelphi University in Garden City, New York with magna cum laude. Until the mid-1990s, Buirski worked as a photographer and picture editor in the international department of The New York Times. In 1994, her image selection of a photo taken by Kevin Carter, which showed a half-starved Sudanese child, resulted in the newspaper winning its first Pulitzer Prize for feature photo reporting. In the same year, her book Earth Angels: Migrant Children in America, was published by Pomegranate Press. It contained 150 photographs by Buirski of children of migrant farmworkers in New York, Florida, California, Washington, and Texas, showing young children at play but also at work during the day and going to school at night. The book raises issues related to exposure to pesticides and other hazards, oppressive heat, low wages, and bad housing.

In 1998 Buirski founded the Full Frame Documentary Film Festival, in collaboration with the Center for Documentary Studies at Duke University in Durham, North Carolina, and directed it for ten years.

== Filmography ==
However, she did not herself make documentaries until The Loving Story in 2011, which concerned the case of Mildred and Richard Loving, an interracial couple. Married in the District of Columbia in 1958, they had not realized that their marriage was illegal in Virginia where they lived, and were only able to avoid imprisonment by agreeing to leave the state. After a lengthy legal battle, the Supreme Court found unanimously in their favor in 1967. Funded by the National Endowment for the Humanities, the film premiered at the Full Frame Documentary Film Festival and was later presented at numerous other events. The film won an Emmy. Buirski was awarded a prize for The Loving Story at the Peabody Awards in 2012 and the movie was also on the shortlist for the Oscar in the category Best Documentary. The Loving Story was also selected for preservation by the Library of Congress in the 2025 class of inductees in the National Film Registry. The documentary was used by director Jeff Nichols as inspiration for the movie Loving (2016), for which Buirski was a producer.

Buirski's second documentary, in 2013, Afternoon of a Faun: Tanaquil Le Clercq tells the story of the ballerina Tanaquil Le Clercq, who contracted polio in 1956 while on tour, and remained paralyzed from the waist down for the rest of her life. Buirski followed this in 2015 with By Sidney Lumet, which provides a portrait of the American movie director Sidney Lumet, based on an interview made in 2008 by Daniel Anker. Lumet talks about his films, remembers colleagues, family and friends and looks back at the beginning of his career as an actor in a Jewish theater group. Both films were co-produced by American Masters/PBS.

In 2017, Buirski made a documentary entitled The Rape of Recy Taylor about Recy Taylor, an African-American woman from Abbeville in Henry County, Alabama. In 1944, Taylor was kidnapped while leaving church and gang-raped by seven white men. Despite the men's confessions, two grand juries declined to indict them and no charges were ever brought. In 2011, the Alabama Legislature officially apologized on behalf of the state "for its failure to prosecute her attackers." The film was awarded the Human Rights Nights prize at the 74th Venice International Film Festival.

Buirski was a member of the Academy of Motion Picture Arts and Sciences and the Television Academy of Arts and Sciences. In addition to her documentaries, she produced several collections of Full Frame shorts and a collection of feature-length documentaries. The Katrina Experience brought together a collection of films about Hurricane Katrina, while Time Piece was a cross-cultural collection of Turkish and American shorts. She also produced Althea, a film about the Black tennis player, Althea Gibson.

== Death ==
Buirski died on August 29, 2023, at the age of 78.
