= Mildred and Richard Loving =

Plaintiffs in the U.S. Supreme Court case Loving v. Virginia

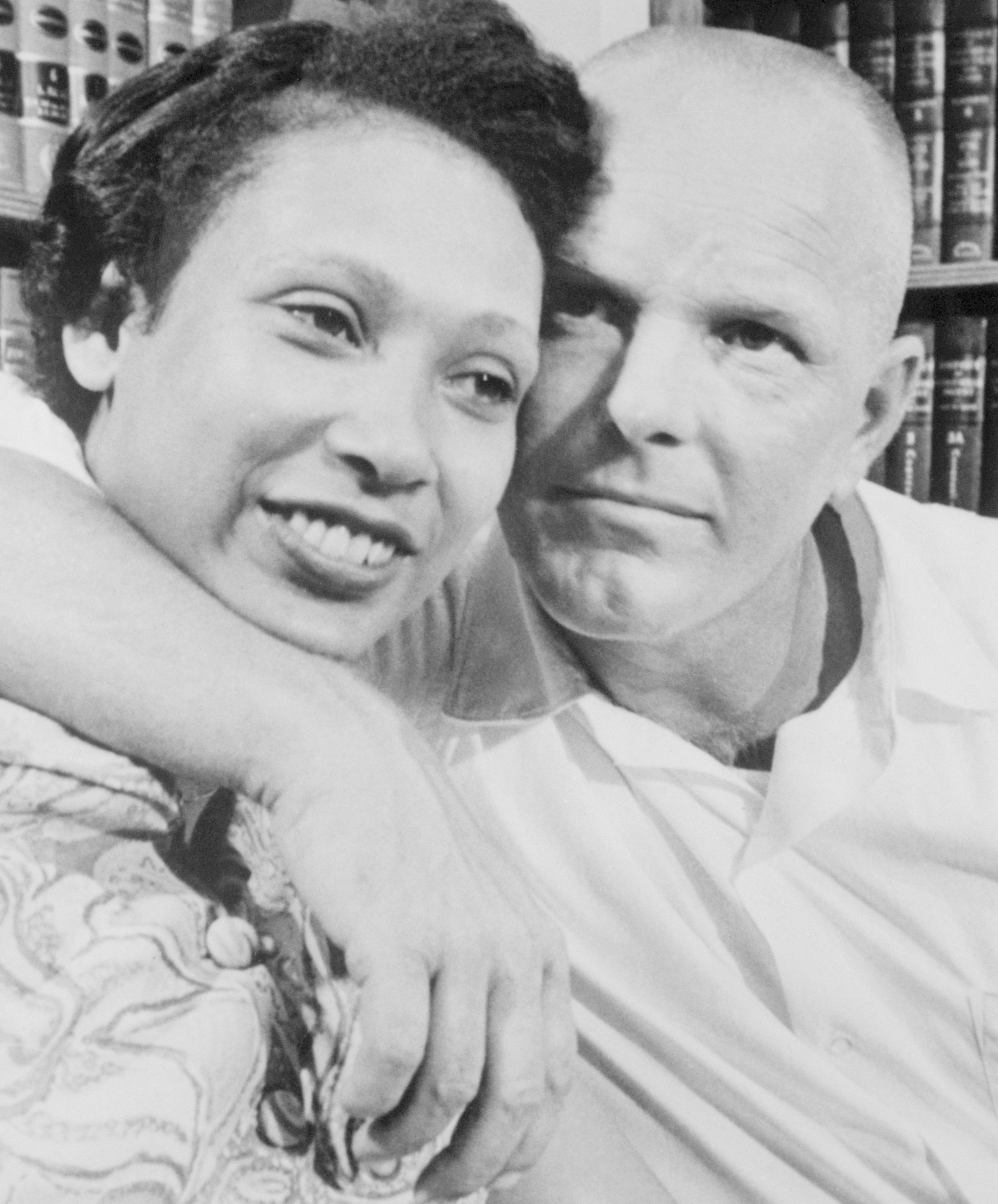
- Mildred and Richard Loving in 1967
- Born: Mildred; Mildred Delores Jeter; July 22, 1939; Central Point, Virginia, U.S. Richard; Richard Perry Loving; October 29, 1933; Central Point, Virginia, U.S.
- Died: Mildred; May 2, 2008 (aged 68); Milford, Virginia, U.S. Richard; June 29, 1975 (aged 41); Caroline County, Virginia, U.S.
- Occupations: Mildred; Housewife; Richard; Construction worker
- Known for: Plaintiffs in Loving v. Virginia (1967)
- Children: 3 - Richard and Mildred raised three children: Sidney, Donald and Peggy, the youngest two being Richard's biological children with Mildred. The oldest child, Sidney Jeter, was from Mildred's previous relationship.

Mildred Delores Loving (née Jeter; July 22, 1939 – May 2, 2008) and Richard Perry Loving (October 29, 1933 – June 29, 1975) were an American married couple who were the plaintiffs in the landmark U.S. Supreme Court case Loving v. Virginia (1967). Their marriage has been the subject of three movies, including the 2016 drama Loving, and several songs. The Lovings were criminally charged with interracial marriage under a Virginia statute banning such marriages, and were forced to leave the state to avoid being jailed. They moved to Washington, D.C., but wanted to return to their home town. With the help of the American Civil Liberties Union (ACLU), they filed suit to overturn the law. In 1967, the Supreme Court ruled in their favor, striking down the Virginia statute and all state anti-miscegenation laws as unconstitutional, for violating due process and equal protection of the law under the Fourteenth Amendment. On June 29, 1975, a drunk driver struck the Lovings' car in Caroline County, Virginia. Richard was killed in the crash, at the age of 41. Mildred lost vision in her right eye.

With the exception of a 2007 statement supporting LGBT rights, Mildred lived "a quiet, private life declining interviews and staying clear of the spotlight" after Loving and the death of her husband. On the 40th anniversary of the decision, she stated: "I am still not a political person, but I am proud that Richard's and my name is on a court case that can help reinforce the love, the commitment, the fairness, and the family that so many people, black or white, young or old, gay or straight, seek in life. I support the freedom to marry for all. That's what Loving, and loving, are all about." Beginning in 2013, the case was cited as precedent in U.S. federal court decisions holding restrictions on same-sex marriage unconstitutional, including in the U.S. Supreme Court decision Obergefell v. Hodges (2015).

== Early life and marriage ==
Mildred Jeter was the daughter of Musial (Byrd) Jeter and Theoliver Jeter. She was born and raised in the small community of Central Point in Caroline County, Virginia. Mildred identified culturally as Native American, specifically Rappahannock, a historic and now a federally recognized tribe in Virginia. (She was reported to have Cherokee, Portuguese, and African American ancestry.) She is often described as having Native American and African American ancestry.

Richard Loving was the son of Lola (Allen) Loving and Twillie Loving. He was also born and raised in Central Point, where he became a construction worker after school. He was European American, classified as white. His father's maternal grandfather, T. P. Farmer, fought for the Confederacy in the Civil War.

Caroline County adhered to the state's strict 20th-century Jim Crow segregation laws, but Central Point had been a visible mixed-race community since the 19th century. Virginia's one-drop rule, codified in law in 1924 as the Racial Integrity Act, required all residents to be classified as "white" or "colored", refusing to use people's longstanding identification as Indian among several tribes in the state.

Richard's father worked for one of the wealthiest black men in the county for 25 years. Richard's closest companions were black (or colored, as was the term then), including those he drag-raced with and Mildred's older brothers. "There's just a few people that live in this community," Richard said. "A few white and a few colored. And as I grew up, and as they grew up, we all helped one another. It was all, as I say, mixed together to start with and just kept goin' that way."

The two first met when Mildred was 11 and Richard was 17. He was a family friend of her brothers. Years later, when she was in high school, they began dating. When Mildred was 16 she became pregnant by another man and Richard moved into the Jeter household. They got married on June 2, 1958 and traveled to Washington, D.C., to do so.

At the time, interracial marriage was banned in Virginia by the Racial Integrity Act of 1924. Mildred later stated that when they married, she did not realize their marriage was illegal in Virginia but she later believed her husband had known it.

After their marriage, the Lovings returned home to Central Point. They were arrested at night by the county sheriff who had received an anonymous tip, and charged with "cohabiting as man and wife, against the peace and dignity of the Commonwealth." They pled guilty and were convicted by the Caroline County Circuit Court on January 6, 1959. They were sentenced to one year in prison, suspended for 25 years on the condition that they leave the state. They moved to Washington, D.C., but missed their country town.

They were frustrated by their inability to travel together to visit their families in Virginia, and by social isolation and financial difficulties in Washington, D.C. In 1964, after their youngest son was hit by a car in the busy streets, they decided they needed to move back to their home town, and they filed suit to vacate the judgment against them so they would be allowed to return home.

== Supreme Court case ==
In 1964, Mildred Loving wrote in protest to Attorney General Robert F. Kennedy. Kennedy referred her to the American Civil Liberties Union.

The ACLU filed a motion on the Lovings' behalf to vacate the judgment and set aside the sentence, on the grounds that the statutes violated the Fourteenth Amendment. This began a series of lawsuits and the case ultimately reached the United States Supreme Court. On October 28, 1964, when their motion still had not been decided, the Lovings began a class action suit in United States district court. On January 22, 1965, the district court allowed the Lovings to present their constitutional claims to the Virginia Supreme Court of Appeals. Virginia Supreme Court Justice Harry L. Carrico (later Chief Justice) wrote the court's opinion upholding the constitutionality of the anti-miscegenation statutes and affirmed the criminal convictions.

The Lovings and ACLU appealed the decision to the U.S. Supreme Court. The Lovings did not attend the oral arguments in Washington, but their lawyer, Bernard S. Cohen, conveyed a message from Richard Loving to the court: "[T]ell the Court I love my wife, and it is just unfair that I can't live with her in Virginia."

The case, Loving v. Virginia, was decided unanimously in the Lovings' favor on June 12, 1967. The Court overturned their convictions, dismissing Virginia's argument that the law was not discriminatory because it applied equally to and provided identical penalties for both white and black persons. The Supreme Court ruled that the anti-miscegenation statute violated both the due process and equal protection clauses of the Fourteenth Amendment. The Lovings returned to Virginia after the Supreme Court decision.

== Later life ==
The Lovings raised three children together: Sidney Clay Jeter (January 27, 1957 – May 2010) who was from a previous relationship of Mildred's, Donald Lendberg Loving (October 8, 1958 – August 2000), and Peggy Loving (born c. 1960). Each of the children married and had their own families. At the time of her death, Mildred had eight grandchildren and eleven great-grandchildren.

After the Supreme Court ruled on the case in 1967, the couple moved with their children back to Central Point, Virginia, where Richard built them a house. This was their home for the rest of their lives.

Mildred said she considered her marriage and the court decision to be "God's work". She supported everyone's right to marry whomever they wished. In 1965, while the case was pending, she told the Washington Evening Star, "We loved each other and got married. We are not marrying the state. The law should allow a person to marry anyone he wants."

=== Support for same-sex marriage ===
On June 12, 2007, the 40th anniversary of the landmark civil rights decision by the Supreme Court of the United States in Loving v. Virginia, Mildred Loving issued a statement that explained their fight for inter-racial marriage in the United States and her support for same-sex marriage in the United States.

== Deaths ==
On June 29, 1975, 42-year-old Floyd Emanuel Golden ran through an intersection and struck the Lovings' car in Caroline County, Virginia. Richard was killed in the crash, at age 41. Mildred lost her right eye. Golden was charged with manslaughter and driving under the influence.

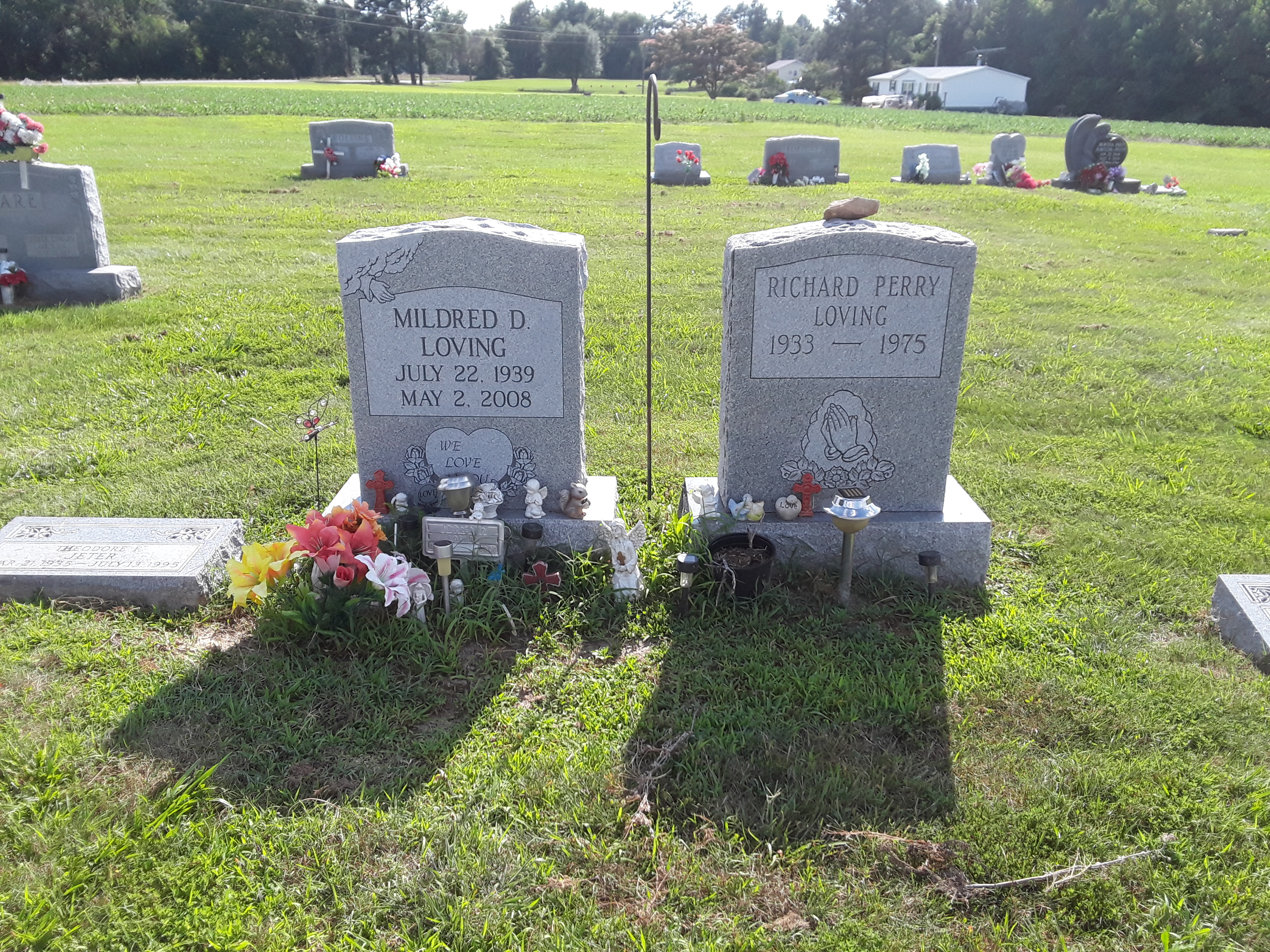
Graves of Mildred and Richard Loving

Mildred died of pneumonia on May 2, 2008, in Milford, Virginia, at age 68. Her daughter, Peggy Loving Fortune, said, "I want [people] to remember her as being strong and brave, yet humble—and believ[ing] in love."

The final sentence in Mildred Loving's obituary in the New York Times notes her statement to commemorate the 40th anniversary of Loving v. Virginia: "A modest homemaker, Loving never thought she had done anything extraordinary. 'It wasn't my doing,' Loving told the Associated Press in a rare interview [in 2007]. 'It was God's work.'"

== Legacy ==
- Mr. and Mrs. Loving, a 1996 film starring Lela Rochon, Timothy Hutton and Ruby Dee, written and directed by Richard Friedenberg. It aired on the Showtime network. According to Loving, "Not much of it was very true. The only part of it right was I had three children."
- June 12 has become known as Loving Day in the United States, an unofficial holiday celebrating interracial marriages.
- Loving, a 2016 film by Jeff Nichols inspired by The Loving Story, starring Joel Edgerton as Richard Loving and Ruth Negga as Mildred Loving. Negga and Edgerton received nominations for an Academy Award and a Golden Globe Award respectively.
- "The Loving Kind" is a song written by country/folk singer-songwriter Nanci Griffith. It was included in Griffith's 2009 album "The Loving Kind"
