= List of accolades received by Arrival =

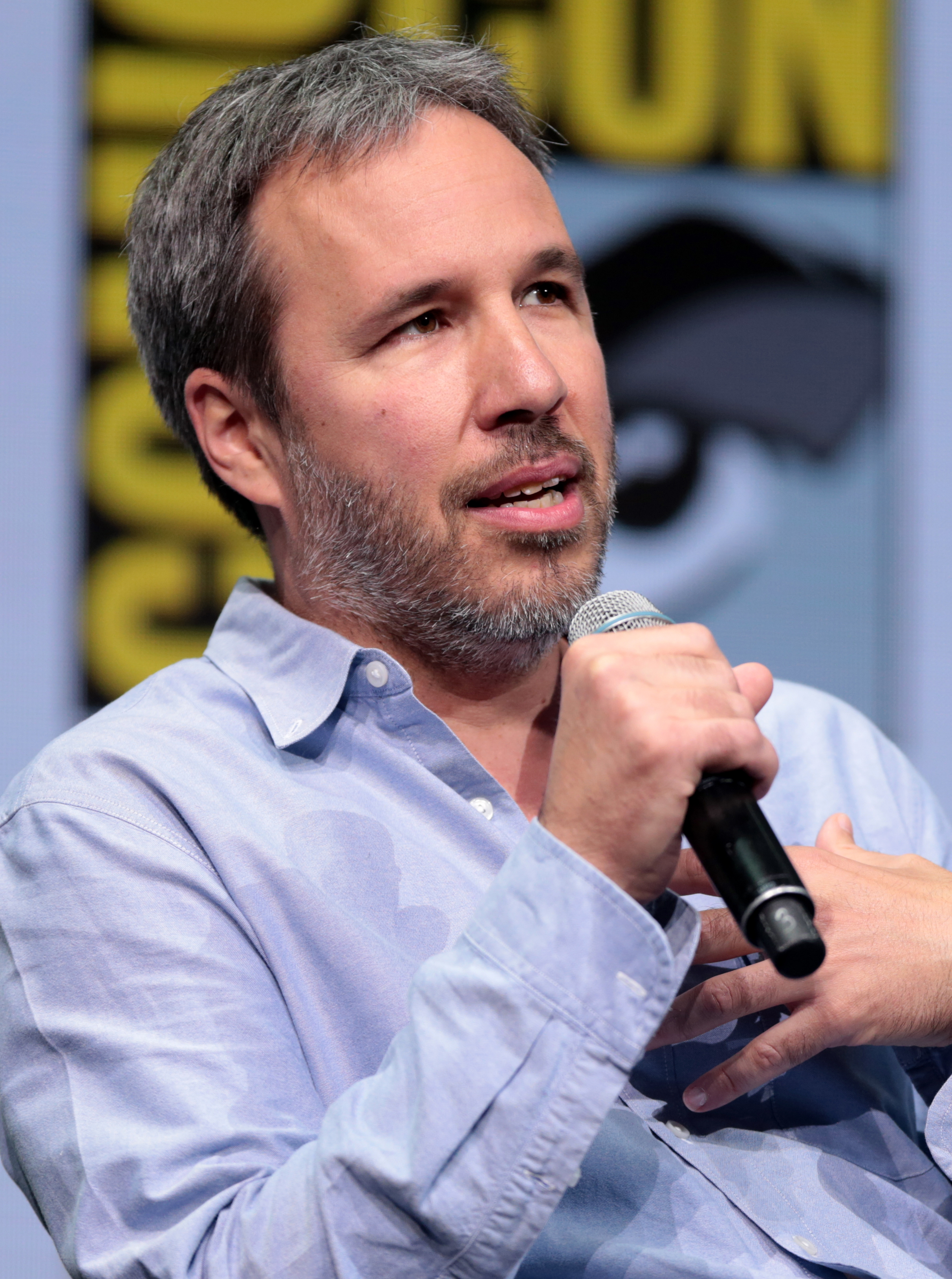
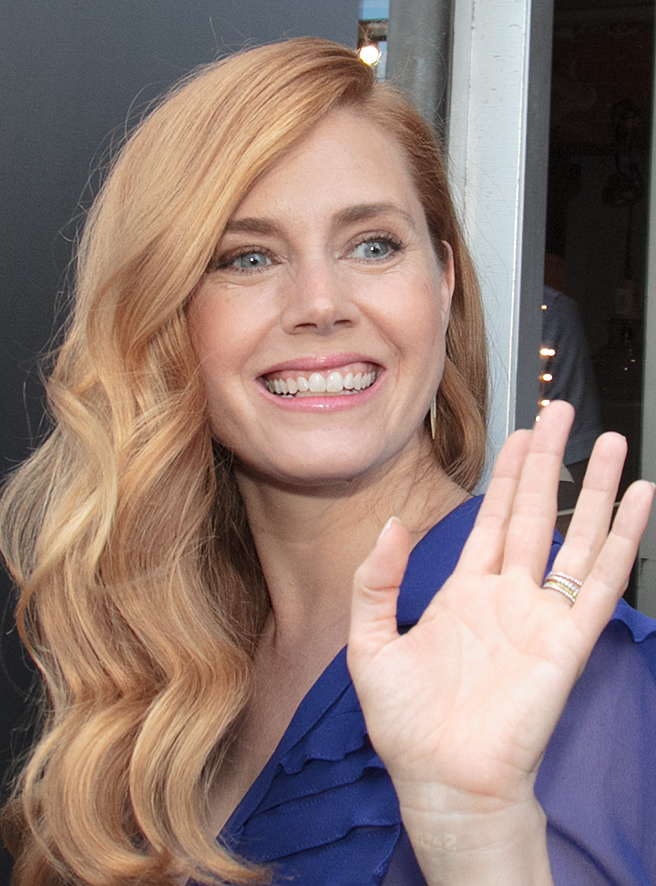
- Denis Villeneuve and Amy Adams received several nominations for their direction and performance in the film.
Awards and nominations
Award	Wins	Nominations
AACTA International Awards	0	3
Academy Awards	1	8
ACE Eddie Awards	1	1
Alliance of Women Film Journalists	0	6
American Society of Cinematographers	0	1
Art Directors Guild Awards	0	1
Austin Film Critics Association	2	6
Australian Film Critics Association	1	1
British Academy Film Awards	1	9
Camerimage	1	1
Chicago Film Critics Association	0	3
Critics' Choice Awards	2	10
Dallas-Fort Worth Film Critics Association	3	3
Detroit Film Critics Society	0	2
Directors Guild of America Awards	0	1
Dorian Awards	0	1
Dragon Awards	0	1
Empire Awards	0	7
Evening Standard British Film Awards	1	1
Florida Film Critics Circle	1	5
Georgia Film Critics Association	0	7
Golden Globe Awards	0	2
Golden Tomato Awards	2	2
Hollywood Music in Media Awards	0	1
Houston Film Critics Society	0	6
Hugo Awards	1	1
IndieWire Critics Poll	7	7
Irish Film & Television Awards	0	1
London Film Critics Circle	0	2
MPSE Golden Reel Awards	0	3
National Board of Review	1	1
Online Film Critics Society	1	6
Palm Springs International Film Festival	1	1
Prix Aurora Awards	1	1
Producers Guild of America	0	1
Ray Bradbury Award	1	1
San Diego Film Critics Society	1	5
San Francisco Film Critics Circle	2	8
Saturn Awards	1	6
Screen Actors Guild Awards	0	1
Seattle Film Critics Society	3	9
St. Louis Film Critics Association	3	8
Teen Choice Awards	0	3
USC Scripter Awards	0	1
Vancouver Film Critics Circle	0	2
Venice Film Festival	1	2
Washington D.C. Area Film Critics Association	1	8
Writers Guild of America Awards	1	1

Totals (Note: Certain award groups do not simply award one winner. They acknowledge several different recipients, have runners-up, and have third place. Since this is a specific recognition and is different from losing an award, runner-up mentions are considered wins in this award tally. For simplification and to avoid errors, each award in this list has been presumed to have had a prior nomination.)
- Wins: 42
- Nominations: 168

Arrival is a 2016 American science fiction film directed by Denis Villeneuve and written by Eric Heisserer. Starring Amy Adams, Jeremy Renner and Forest Whitaker, the film focuses on the contact between a linguist (Adams) and aliens in one of 12 extraterrestrial spacecraft that appear across Earth. The film had its world premiere at the Venice Film Festival on September 1, 2016, and was released to theaters on November 11, 2016. The film was released to positive reviews, with Rotten Tomatoes aggregating an approval rating of 94%, based on 327 reviews, with an average rating of 8.3/10 and Metacritic giving a score of 81 out of 100, based on 52 reviews.

Arrival won Best Sound Editing and was nominated for Best Picture, Best Director, Best Adapted Screenplay, Best Sound Mixing, Best Cinematography, Best Film Editing and Best Production Design at the Academy Awards. The film won Best Sound and was nominated for Best Film, Best Actress in a Leading Role for Adams, Best Direction, Best Adapted Screenplay, Best Cinematography, Best Editing, Best Film Music and Best Special Visual Effects at British Academy Film Awards. The film won Best Sci-Fi/Horror Movie and Best Adapted Screenplay and was nominated for Best Picture, Best Director, Best Actress for Adams, Best Cinematography, Best Art Direction, Best Editing, Best Visual Effects and Best Score at the Critics' Choice Awards. The film received two nominations at the Golden Globe Awards, including Best Actress – Motion Picture Drama for Adams and Best Original Score.

== Accolades ==
Award	Date of ceremony	Category	Recipient(s)	Result	Ref.
AACTA International Awards	January 8, 2017	Best Film	Arrival	Nominated	
AACTA International Awards	January 8, 2017	Best Direction	Denis Villeneuve	Nominated	
AACTA International Awards	January 8, 2017	Best Actress	Amy Adams	Nominated	
Academy Awards	February 26, 2017	Best Picture	Dan Levine, Shawn Levy, David Linde and Aaron Ryder	Nominated	
Academy Awards	February 26, 2017	Best Director	Denis Villeneuve	Nominated	
Academy Awards	February 26, 2017	Best Adapted Screenplay	Eric Heisserer	Nominated	
Academy Awards	February 26, 2017	Best Cinematography	Bradford Young	Nominated	
Academy Awards	February 26, 2017	Best Film Editing	Joe Walker	Nominated	
Academy Awards	February 26, 2017	Best Production Design	Paul Hotte and Patrice Vermette	Nominated	
Academy Awards	February 26, 2017	Best Sound Editing	Sylvain Bellemare	Won	
Academy Awards	February 26, 2017	Best Sound Mixing	Claude La Haye and Bernard Gariépy Strobl	Nominated	
ACE Eddie Awards	January 27, 2017	Best Edited Feature Film – Dramatic	Joe Walker	Won	
Alliance of Women Film Journalists	December 21, 2016	Best Film	Arrival	Nominated	
Alliance of Women Film Journalists	December 21, 2016	Best Director	Denis Villeneuve	Nominated	
Alliance of Women Film Journalists	December 21, 2016	Best Actress	Amy Adams	Nominated	
Alliance of Women Film Journalists	December 21, 2016	Best Screenplay, Adapted	Eric Heisserer	Nominated	
Alliance of Women Film Journalists	December 21, 2016	Best Cinematography	Bradford Young	Nominated	
Alliance of Women Film Journalists	December 21, 2016	Best Editing	Joe Walker	Nominated	
American Society of Cinematographers	February 4, 2017	Outstanding Cinematography in Theatrical Releases	Bradford Young	Nominated	
Art Directors Guild Awards	February 11, 2017	Excellence in Production Design for a Fantasy Film	Patrice Vermette	Nominated	
Austin Film Critics Association	December 28, 2016	Best Film	Arrival	3rd Place	
Austin Film Critics Association	December 28, 2016	Best Director	Denis Villeneuve	Nominated	
Austin Film Critics Association	December 28, 2016	Best Actress	Amy Adams	Nominated	
Austin Film Critics Association	December 28, 2016	Best Adapted Screenplay	Eric Heisserer	Won	
Austin Film Critics Association	December 28, 2016	Best Cinematography	Bradford Young	Nominated	
Austin Film Critics Association	December 28, 2016	Best Score	Jóhann Jóhannsson	Nominated	
Australian Film Critics Association	March 7, 2017	Best International Film (English Language)	Arrival	Won	
British Academy Film Awards	February 12, 2017	Best Film	Dan Levine, Shawn Levy, David Linde and Aaron Ryder	Nominated	
British Academy Film Awards	February 12, 2017	Best Actress in a Leading Role	Amy Adams	Nominated	
British Academy Film Awards	February 12, 2017	Best Direction	Denis Villeneuve	Nominated	
British Academy Film Awards	February 12, 2017	Best Adapted Screenplay	Eric Heisserer	Nominated	
British Academy Film Awards	February 12, 2017	Best Cinematography	Bradford Young	Nominated	
British Academy Film Awards	February 12, 2017	Best Editing	Joe Walker	Nominated	
British Academy Film Awards	February 12, 2017	Best Film Music	Jóhann Jóhannsson	Nominated	
British Academy Film Awards	February 12, 2017	Best Sound	Sylvain Bellemare, Claude La Haye and Bernard Gariépy Strobl	Won	
British Academy Film Awards	February 12, 2017	Best Special Visual Effects	Louis Morin	Nominated	
Camerimage	November 19, 2016	Silver Frog Award for Best Cinematography	Bradford Young	Won	
Chicago Film Critics Association	December 15, 2016	Best Actress	Amy Adams	Nominated	
Chicago Film Critics Association	December 15, 2016	Best Adapted Screenplay	Eric Heisserer	Nominated	
Chicago Film Critics Association	December 15, 2016	Best Original Score	Jóhann Jóhannsson	Nominated	
Critics' Choice Awards	December 11, 2016	Best Picture	Arrival	Nominated	
Critics' Choice Awards	December 11, 2016	Best Director	Denis Villeneuve	Nominated	
Critics' Choice Awards	December 11, 2016	Best Actress	Amy Adams	Nominated	
Critics' Choice Awards	December 11, 2016	Best Adapted Screenplay	Eric Heisserer	Won	
Critics' Choice Awards	December 11, 2016	Best Cinematography	Bradford Young	Nominated	
Critics' Choice Awards	December 11, 2016	Best Art Direction	Paul Hotte, André Valade and Patrice Vermette	Nominated	
Critics' Choice Awards	December 11, 2016	Best Editing	Joe Walker	Nominated	
Critics' Choice Awards	December 11, 2016	Best Visual Effects	Arrival	Nominated	
Critics' Choice Awards	December 11, 2016	Best Sci-Fi/Horror Movie	Arrival	Won	
Critics' Choice Awards	December 11, 2016	Best Score	Jóhann Jóhannsson	Nominated	
Dallas–Fort Worth Film Critics Association	December 13, 2016	Best Film	Arrival	5th Place	
Dallas–Fort Worth Film Critics Association	December 13, 2016	Best Actress	Amy Adams	4th Place	
Dallas–Fort Worth Film Critics Association	December 13, 2016	Best Director	Denis Villeneuve	5th Place	
Detroit Film Critics Society	December 19, 2016	Best Actress	Amy Adams	Nominated	
Detroit Film Critics Society	December 19, 2016	Best Screenplay	Eric Heisserer	Nominated	
Directors Guild of America Awards	February 4, 2017	Outstanding Directing – Feature Film	Denis Villeneuve	Nominated	
Dorian Awards	January 26, 2017	Visually Striking Film of the Year	Arrival	Nominated	
Dragon Awards	September 3, 2017	Best Science Fiction or Fantasy Movie	Arrival	Nominated	
Empire Awards	March 19, 2017	Best Film	Arrival	Nominated	
Empire Awards	March 19, 2017	Best Sci-Fi/Fantasy	Arrival	Nominated	
Empire Awards	March 19, 2017	Best Actress	Amy Adams	Nominated	
Empire Awards	March 19, 2017	Best Director	Denis Villeneuve	Nominated	
Empire Awards	March 19, 2017	Best Soundtrack	Arrival	Nominated	
Empire Awards	March 19, 2017	Best Screenplay	Arrival	Nominated	
Empire Awards	March 19, 2017	Best Production Design	Arrival	Nominated	
Evening Standard British Film Awards	December 8, 2016	Technical Achievement	Max Richter (music)	Won	
Florida Film Critics Circle	December 23, 2016	Best Adapted Screenplay	Eric Heisserer	Nominated	
Florida Film Critics Circle	December 23, 2016	Best Cinematography	Bradford Young	Nominated	
Florida Film Critics Circle	December 23, 2016	Best Art Direction / Production Design	Arrival	Nominated	
Florida Film Critics Circle	December 23, 2016	Best Score	Arrival	Nominated	
Florida Film Critics Circle	December 23, 2016	Best Visual Effects	Arrival	Won	
Georgia Film Critics Association	January 13, 2017	Best Picture	Arrival	Nominated	
Georgia Film Critics Association	January 13, 2017	Best Director	Denis Villeneuve	Nominated	
Georgia Film Critics Association	January 13, 2017	Best Actress	Amy Adams	Nominated	
Georgia Film Critics Association	January 13, 2017	Best Adapted Screenplay	Eric Heisserer	Nominated	
Georgia Film Critics Association	January 13, 2017	Best Cinematography	Bradford Young	Nominated	
Georgia Film Critics Association	January 13, 2017	Best Production Design	Patrice Vermette and Isabelle Guay	Nominated	
Georgia Film Critics Association	January 13, 2017	Best Original Score	Jóhann Jóhannsson	Nominated	
Golden Globe Awards	January 8, 2017	Best Actress – Motion Picture Drama	Amy Adams	Nominated	
Golden Globe Awards	January 8, 2017	Best Original Score	Jóhann Jóhannsson	Nominated	
Golden Tomato Awards	January 12, 2017	Best Wide Release 2016	Arrival	3rd Place	
Golden Tomato Awards	January 12, 2017	Best Sci-Fi/Fantasy Movie 2016	Arrival	Won	
Hollywood Music in Media Awards	November 17, 2016	Best Original Score – Sci-Fi/Fantasy Film	Jóhann Jóhannsson	Nominated	
Houston Film Critics Society	January 6, 2017	Best Picture	Arrival	Nominated	
Houston Film Critics Society	January 6, 2017	Best Actress	Amy Adams	Nominated	
Houston Film Critics Society	January 6, 2017	Best Director	Denis Villeneuve	Nominated	
Houston Film Critics Society	January 6, 2017	Best Cinematography	Bradford Young	Nominated	
Houston Film Critics Society	January 6, 2017	Best Original Score	Jóhann Jóhannsson	Nominated	
Houston Film Critics Society	January 6, 2017	Best Screenplay	Eric Heisserer	Nominated	
Hugo Award	August 11, 2017	Best Dramatic Presentation	Eric Heisserer and Denis Villeneuve	Won	
IndieWire Critics Poll	December 19, 2016	Best Film	Arrival	8th Place	
IndieWire Critics Poll	December 19, 2016	Best Director	Denis Villeneuve	7th Place	
IndieWire Critics Poll	December 19, 2016	Best Actress	Amy Adams	6th Place	
IndieWire Critics Poll	December 19, 2016	Best Screenplay	Arrival	6th Place	
IndieWire Critics Poll	December 19, 2016	Best Original Score or Soundtrack	Arrival	4th Place	
IndieWire Critics Poll	December 19, 2016	Best Cinematography	Arrival	3rd Place	
IndieWire Critics Poll	December 19, 2016	Best Editing	Arrival	7th Place	
Irish Film & Television Awards	April 8, 2017	International Actress	Amy Adams	Nominated	
London Film Critics' Circle	January 22, 2017	Actress of the Year	Amy Adams	Nominated	
London Film Critics' Circle	January 22, 2017	Technical Achievement	Sylvain Bellemare (sound design)	Nominated	
MPSE Golden Reel Awards	February 19, 2017	Feature English Language: Dialogue/ADR	Sylvain Bellemare, Valery Dufort-Boucher, Claire Pochon and Stan Sakellaropoulos	Nominated	
MPSE Golden Reel Awards	February 19, 2017	Feature English Language: Effects/Foley	Mimi Allard, Pierre-Jules Audet, Niels Barletta, Mathieu Beaudin, Nicholas Becker, Sylvain Bellemare, Olivier Calvert, Daniel Capeille, Michelle Child, Steven Ghouti, Simon Girard, Olivier Guillaume, Alan Murray, Luc Raymond, Patrick Rioux, Gregory Vincent and Dave Whitehead	Nominated	
MPSE Golden Reel Awards	February 19, 2017	Feature Music	Clint Bennett	Nominated	
National Board of Review	January 4, 2017	Best Actress	Amy Adams	Won	
Online Film Critics Society	January 3, 2017	Best Picture	Arrival	Nominated	
Online Film Critics Society	January 3, 2017	Best Director	Denis Villeneuve	Nominated	
Online Film Critics Society	January 3, 2017	Best Actress	Amy Adams	Nominated	
Online Film Critics Society	January 3, 2017	Best Adapted Screenplay	Eric Heisserer	Won	
Online Film Critics Society	January 3, 2017	Best Editing	Joe Walker	Nominated	
Online Film Critics Society	January 3, 2017	Best Cinematography	Bradford Young	Nominated	
Palm Springs International Film Festival	January 2, 2017	Chairman's Award	Amy Adams	Won	
Prix Aurora Awards	September 22–24, 2017	Best Visual Presentation	Denis Villeneuve	Won	
Producers Guild of America	January 28, 2017	Best Theatrical Motion Picture	Dan Levine, Shawn Levy, David Linde and Aaron Ryder	Nominated	
Ray Bradbury Award	May 18–21, 2017	Outstanding Dramatic Presentation	Eric Heisserer and Denis Villeneuve	Won	
San Diego Film Critics Society	December 12, 2016	Best Adapted Screenplay	Eric Heisserer	Nominated	
San Diego Film Critics Society	December 12, 2016	Best Editing	Joe Walker	Nominated	
San Diego Film Critics Society	December 12, 2016	Best Cinematography	Bradford Young	Nominated	
San Diego Film Critics Society	December 12, 2016	Best Production Design	Patrice Vermette	Nominated	
San Diego Film Critics Society	December 12, 2016	Best Visual Effects	Arrival	Runner-up	
San Francisco Film Critics Circle	December 11, 2016	Best Film	Arrival	Nominated	
San Francisco Film Critics Circle	December 11, 2016	Best Director	Denis Villeneuve	Nominated	
San Francisco Film Critics Circle	December 11, 2016	Best Actress	Amy Adams	Nominated	
San Francisco Film Critics Circle	December 11, 2016	Best Adapted Screenplay	Eric Heisserer	Won	
San Francisco Film Critics Circle	December 11, 2016	Best Cinematography	Bradford Young	Nominated	
San Francisco Film Critics Circle	December 11, 2016	Best Production Design	Patrice Vermette	Nominated	
San Francisco Film Critics Circle	December 11, 2016	Best Original Score	Jóhann Jóhannsson	Nominated	
San Francisco Film Critics Circle	December 11, 2016	Best Film Editing	Joe Walker	Won (Note: Tied with Joi McMillon and Nat Sanders for Moonlight)	
Saturn Awards	June 28, 2017	Best Science Fiction Film	Arrival	Nominated	
Saturn Awards	June 28, 2017	Best Actress	Amy Adams	Nominated	
Saturn Awards	June 28, 2017	Best Director	Denis Villeneuve	Nominated	
Saturn Awards	June 28, 2017	Best Writing	Eric Heisserer	Won	
Saturn Awards	June 28, 2017	Best Editing	Joe Walker	Nominated	
Saturn Awards	June 28, 2017	Best Special Effects	Ryal Cosgrove and Louis Morin	Nominated	
Screen Actors Guild Awards	January 29, 2017	Outstanding Female Actor	Amy Adams	Nominated	
Seattle Film Critics Society	January 5, 2017	Best Picture of the Year	Arrival	Nominated	
Seattle Film Critics Society	January 5, 2017	Best Director	Denis Villeneuve	Nominated	
Seattle Film Critics Society	January 5, 2017	Best Actress in a Leading Role	Amy Adams	Nominated	
Seattle Film Critics Society	January 5, 2017	Best Screenplay	Eric Heisserer	Nominated	
Seattle Film Critics Society	January 5, 2017	Best Cinematography	Bradford Young	Won	
Seattle Film Critics Society	January 5, 2017	Best Film Editing	Joe Walker	Nominated	
Seattle Film Critics Society	January 5, 2017	Best Original Score	Jóhann Jóhannsson	Won	
Seattle Film Critics Society	January 5, 2017	Best Production Design	Paul Hotte and Patrice Vermette	Nominated	
Seattle Film Critics Society	January 5, 2017	Best Visual Effects	Louis Morin	Won (Note: Tied with Stephane Ceretti, Richard Bluff, Vincent Cirelli and Paul Corbould for Doctor Strange)	
St. Louis Film Critics Association	December 18, 2016	Best Film	Arrival	Nominated	
St. Louis Film Critics Association	December 18, 2016	Best Director	Denis Villeneuve	Runner-up (Note: Tied with Kenneth Lonergan for Manchester by the Sea)	
St. Louis Film Critics Association	December 18, 2016	Best Actress	Amy Adams	Nominated	
St. Louis Film Critics Association	December 18, 2016	Best Adapted Screenplay	Eric Heisserer	Runner-up	
St. Louis Film Critics Association	December 18, 2016	Best Cinematography	Bradford Young	Nominated	
St. Louis Film Critics Association	December 18, 2016	Best Visual Effects	Arrival	Nominated	
St. Louis Film Critics Association	December 18, 2016	Best Music/Score	Jóhann Jóhannsson	Nominated	
St. Louis Film Critics Association	December 18, 2016	Best Horror/Science-Fiction Film	Arrival	Runner-up	
Teen Choice Awards	August 13, 2017	Choice Movie: Sci-Fi/Fantasy	Arrival	Nominated	
Teen Choice Awards	August 13, 2017	Choice Movie Actress: Sci-Fi/Fantasy	Amy Adams	Nominated	
Teen Choice Awards	August 13, 2017	Choice Movie Actor: Sci-Fi/Fantasy	Jeremy Renner	Nominated	
USC Scripter Awards	February 11, 2017	Best Screenplay	Eric Heisserer	Nominated	
Vancouver Film Critics Circle	December 20, 2016	Best Actress	Amy Adams	Nominated	
Vancouver Film Critics Circle	December 20, 2016	Best Director	Denis Villeneuve	Nominated	
Venice Film Festival	September 10, 2016	Future Film Festival Digital Award	Denis Villeneuve	Won	
Venice Film Festival	September 10, 2016	Golden Lion	Denis Villeneuve	Nominated	
Washington D.C. Area Film Critics Association	December 5, 2016	Best Film	Arrival	Nominated	
Washington D.C. Area Film Critics Association	December 5, 2016	Best Director	Denis Villeneuve	Nominated	
Washington D.C. Area Film Critics Association	December 5, 2016	Best Actress	Amy Adams	Nominated	
Washington D.C. Area Film Critics Association	December 5, 2016	Best Adapted Screenplay	Eric Heisserer	Won	
Washington D.C. Area Film Critics Association	December 5, 2016	Best Art Direction	Paul Hotte and Patrice Vermette	Nominated	
Washington D.C. Area Film Critics Association	December 5, 2016	Best Cinematography	Bradford Young	Nominated	
Washington D.C. Area Film Critics Association	December 5, 2016	Best Editing	Joe Walker	Nominated	
Washington D.C. Area Film Critics Association	December 5, 2016	Best Score	Jóhann Jóhannsson	Nominated	
Writers Guild of America Awards	February 19, 2017	Best Adapted Screenplay	Eric Heisserer	Won	
