= List of accolades received by Jackie (2016 film) =

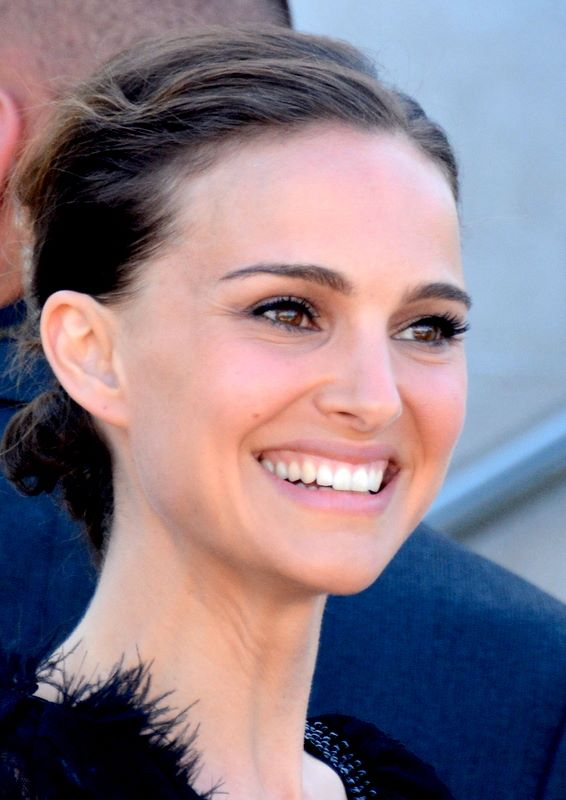
- Natalie Portman has received various awards and nominations for her performance in the film
Accolades
| Award | Won | Nominated | Standing |
| AACTA International Awards | 0 | 1 |
| AARP Annual Movies for Grownups Awards | 1 | 1 |
| Academy Awards | 0 | 3 |
| Alliance of Women Film Journalists | 0 | 1 |
| Art Directors Guild Awards | 0 | 1 |
| Austin Film Critics Association | 0 | 4 | 9th Place |
| Boston Society of Film Critics | 1 | 2 | Runner-up |
| British Academy Film Awards | 1 | 3 |
| Chicago Film Critics Association | 2 | 8 |
| Costume Designers Guild | 0 | 1 |
| Critics' Choice Awards | 3 | 6 |
| Dallas-Fort Worth Film Critics Association | 1 | 3 | 2nd Place, 6th Place |
| Detroit Film Critics Society | 0 | 1 |
| Dorian Awards | 0 | 4 |
| Empire Awards | 0 | 1 |
| Florida Film Critics Circle | 0 | 4 | Runner-up (2) |
| Golden Globe Awards | 0 | 1 |
| Gotham Awards | 0 | 1 |
| Hollywood Film Awards | 1 | 1 |
| Hollywood Music in Media Awards | 0 | 1 |
| Houston Film Critics Society | 1 | 5 |
| Independent Spirit Awards | 0 | 4 |
| IndieWire Critics Poll | 1 | 7 | 2nd Place, 5th Place (2), 6th Place, 8th Place, 10th Place |
| London Film Critics Circle | 0 | 1 |
| Los Angeles Film Critics Association | 0 | 1 | Runner-up |
| Make-Up Artists and Hair Stylists Guild | 0 | 1 |
| New York Film Critics Online | 1 | 1 |
| Online Film Critics Society | 1 | 6 |
| Palm Springs International Film Festival | 1 | 1 |
| San Diego Film Critics Society | 0 | 4 | Runner-up (2) |
| San Francisco Film Critics Circle | 1 | 4 |
| Satellite Awards | 1 | 5 |
| Screen Actors Guild Awards | 0 | 1 |
| St. Louis Gateway Film Critics Association | 1 | 4 | Runner-up (3) |
| Toronto Film Critics Association | 0 | 1 | Runner-up |
| Toronto International Film Festival | 1 | 1 |
| Vancouver Film Critics Circle | 0 | 1 |
| Venice Film Festival | 2 | 3 |
| Washington D.C. Area Film Critics Association | 2 | 6 |
| Women Film Critics Circle | 2 | 2 |
- Total number of awards and nominations
| Totals | 25 | 107 | |
- References

Jackie is a 2016 biographical drama film directed by Pablo Larraín and written by Noah Oppenheim. Starring Natalie Portman, the film focuses on Jacqueline "Jackie" Kennedy's life before and after the 1963 assassination of her husband John F. Kennedy. The film had its world premiere at the Venice Film Festival on September 7, 2016 and was released to theaters on December 2, 2016. The film was released to universal acclaim, with Rotten Tomatoes gave an approval rating of 89%, based on 265 reviews, with an average rating of 7.9/10 and Metacritic gave a score of 81 out of 100, based on 52 reviews.

Jackie received three nominations at Academy Awards, including Best Actress for Portman, Best Costume Design and Best Original Score. At the British Academy Film Awards, the film won Best Costume Design, with Portman receiving a nomination for Best Actress and the film’s composer receiving a nomination for Best Original Music The film won Best Actress for Portman, Best Costume Design and Best Hair and Makeup and nominated for Best Cinematography, Best Art Direction and Best Score at Critics' Choice Awards. Portman was nominated for Best Actress – Motion Picture Drama at Golden Globe Awards. The film won Best Costume Design and nominated for Best Film, Best Director, Best Actress and Best Art Direction and Production Design at Satellite Awards.

== Accolades ==
| Award | Date of ceremony | Category | Recipient(s) and nominee(s) | Result | Ref. |
|---|---|---|---|---|---|
| AACTA International Awards | January 8, 2017 | Best Actress | Natalie Portman | Nominated | |
| AARP Annual Movies for Grownups Awards | February 6, 2017 | Best Time Capsule | Jackie | Won | |
| Academy Awards | February 26, 2017 | Best Actress | Natalie Portman | Nominated | |
| Academy Awards | February 26, 2017 | Best Costume Design | Madeline Fontaine | Nominated | |
| Academy Awards | February 26, 2017 | Best Original Score | Mica Levi | Nominated | |
| Alliance of Women Film Journalists | December 21, 2016 | Best Actress | Natalie Portman | Nominated | |
| Art Directors Guild Awards | February 11, 2017 | Excellence in Production Design for a Period Film | Jean Rabasse | Nominated | |
| Austin Film Critics Association | December 28, 2016 | Best Film | Jackie | 9th Place | |
| Austin Film Critics Association | December 28, 2016 | Best Actress | Natalie Portman | Nominated | |
| Austin Film Critics Association | December 28, 2016 | Best Cinematography | Stéphane Fontaine | Nominated | |
| Austin Film Critics Association | December 28, 2016 | Best Score | Mica Levi | Nominated | |
| Boston Society of Film Critics | December 11, 2016 | Best Original Score | Mica Levi | Won | |
| Boston Society of Film Critics | December 11, 2016 | Best Actress | Natalie Portman | Runner-up | |
| British Academy Film Awards | February 12, 2017 | Best Actress in a Leading Role | Natalie Portman | Nominated | |
| British Academy Film Awards | February 12, 2017 | Best Costume Design | Madeline Fontaine | Won | |
| British Academy Film Awards | February 12, 2017 | Best Original Music | Mica Levi | Nominated | |
| Chicago Film Critics Association | December 15, 2016 | Best Film | Jackie | Nominated | |
| Chicago Film Critics Association | December 15, 2016 | Best Director | Pablo Larraín | Nominated | |
| Chicago Film Critics Association | December 15, 2016 | Best Actress | Natalie Portman | Won | |
| Chicago Film Critics Association | December 15, 2016 | Best Original Screenplay | Noah Oppenheim | Nominated | |
| Chicago Film Critics Association | December 15, 2016 | Best Cinematography | Stéphane Fontaine | Nominated | |
| Chicago Film Critics Association | December 15, 2016 | Best Editing | Sebastián Sepúlveda | Nominated | |
| Chicago Film Critics Association | December 15, 2016 | Best Original Score | Mica Levi | Won | |
| Chicago Film Critics Association | December 15, 2016 | Best Art Direction | Jackie | Nominated | |
| Costume Designers Guild | February 21, 2017 | Excellence in Period Film | Madeline Fontaine | Nominated | |
| Critics' Choice Awards | December 11, 2016 | Best Actress | Natalie Portman | Won | |
| Critics' Choice Awards | December 11, 2016 | Best Cinematography | Stéphane Fontaine | Nominated | |
| Critics' Choice Awards | December 11, 2016 | Best Art Direction | Véronique Melery and Jean Rabasse | Nominated | |
| Critics' Choice Awards | December 11, 2016 | Best Costume Design | Madeline Fontaine | Won | |
| Critics' Choice Awards | December 11, 2016 | Best Hair and Makeup | Jackie | Won | |
| Critics' Choice Awards | December 11, 2016 | Best Score | Mica Levi | Nominated | |
| Dallas–Fort Worth Film Critics Association | December 13, 2016 | Best Film | Jackie | 6th Place | |
| Dallas–Fort Worth Film Critics Association | December 13, 2016 | Best Actress | Natalie Portman | Won | |
| Dallas–Fort Worth Film Critics Association | December 13, 2016 | Best Musical Score | Mica Levi | 2nd Place | |
| Detroit Film Critics Society | December 19, 2016 | Best Actress | Natalie Portman | Nominated | |
| Dorian Awards | January 26, 2017 | Film of the Year | Jackie | Nominated | |
| Dorian Awards | January 26, 2017 | Director of the Year | Pablo Larraín | Nominated | |
| Dorian Awards | January 26, 2017 | Film Performance of the Year — Actress | Natalie Portman | Nominated | |
| Dorian Awards | January 26, 2017 | Visually Striking Film of the Year | Jackie | Nominated | |
| Empire Awards | March 19, 2017 | Best Actress | Natalie Portman | Nominated | |
| Florida Film Critics Circle | December 23, 2016 | Best Actress | Natalie Portman | Nominated | |
| Florida Film Critics Circle | December 23, 2016 | Best Cinematography | Stéphane Fontaine | Nominated | |
| Florida Film Critics Circle | December 23, 2016 | Best Art Direction/Production Design | Jackie | Runner-up | |
| Florida Film Critics Circle | December 23, 2016 | Best Score | Jackie | Runner-up | |
| Golden Globe Awards | January 8, 2017 | Best Actress – Motion Picture Drama | Natalie Portman | Nominated | |
| Gotham Awards | November 28, 2016 | Best Actress | Natalie Portman | Nominated | |
| Hollywood Film Awards | November 6, 2016 | Hollywood Actress Award | Natalie Portman | Won | |
| Hollywood Music in Media Awards | November 17, 2016 | Best Original Score – Feature Film | Mica Levi | Nominated | |
| Houston Film Critics Society | January 6, 2017 | Best Picture | Jackie | Nominated | |
| Houston Film Critics Society | January 6, 2017 | Best Actress | Natalie Portman | Won | |
| Houston Film Critics Society | January 6, 2017 | Best Cinematography | Stéphane Fontaine | Nominated | |
| Houston Film Critics Society | January 6, 2017 | Best Original Score | Mica Levi | Nominated | |
| Houston Film Critics Society | January 6, 2017 | Best Poster | Jackie | Nominated | |
| Independent Spirit Awards | February 25, 2017 | Best Film | Darren Aronofsky, Scott Franklin, Ari Handel, Juan de Dios Larraín and Mickey Liddell | Nominated | |
| Independent Spirit Awards | February 25, 2017 | Best Director | Pablo Larraín | Nominated | |
| Independent Spirit Awards | February 25, 2017 | Best Female Lead | Natalie Portman | Nominated | |
| Independent Spirit Awards | February 25, 2017 | Best Editing | Sebastián Sepúlveda | Nominated | |
| IndieWire Critics Poll | December 19, 2016 | Best Film | Jackie | 10th Place | |
| IndieWire Critics Poll | December 19, 2016 | Best Director | Pablo Larraín | 6th Place | |
| IndieWire Critics Poll | December 19, 2016 | Best Actress | Natalie Portman | 2nd Place | |
| IndieWire Critics Poll | December 19, 2016 | Best Screenplay | Noah Oppenheim | 8th Place | |
| IndieWire Critics Poll | December 19, 2016 | Best Cinematography | Stéphane Fontaine | 5th Place | |
| IndieWire Critics Poll | December 19, 2016 | Best Editing | Sebastián Sepúlveda | 5th Place | |
| IndieWire Critics Poll | December 19, 2016 | Best Original Score or Soundtrack | Mica Levi | Won | |
| London Film Critics Circle | January 22, 2017 | Technical Achievement | Mica Levi (music) | Nominated | |
| Los Angeles Film Critics Association | December 4, 2016 | Best Music | Mica Levi | Runner-up | |
| Make-Up Artists and Hair Stylists Guild | February 19, 2017 | Feature-Length Motion Picture – Period and/or Character Hair Styling | Catherine Leblanc-Caraes and Tony Rochetti | Nominated | |
| New York Film Critics Online | December 11, 2016 | Top 12 Films | Jackie | Won | |
| Online Film Critics Society | January 3, 2017 | Best Picture | Jackie | Nominated | |
| Online Film Critics Society | January 3, 2017 | Best Director | Pablo Larraín | Nominated | |
| Online Film Critics Society | January 3, 2017 | Best Actress | Natalie Portman | Won | |
| Online Film Critics Society | January 3, 2017 | Best Original Screenplay | Noah Oppenheim | Nominated | |
| Online Film Critics Society | January 3, 2017 | Best Editing | Sebastián Sepúlveda | Nominated | |
| Online Film Critics Society | January 3, 2017 | Best Cinematography | Stéphane Fontaine | Nominated | |
| Palm Springs International Film Festival | January 2, 2017 | Desert Palm Achievement Award for Best Actress | Natalie Portman | Won | |
| San Diego Film Critics Society | December 12, 2016 | Best Actress | Natalie Portman | Nominated | |
| San Diego Film Critics Society | December 12, 2016 | Best Production Design | Jean Rabasse | Nominated | |
| San Diego Film Critics Society | December 12, 2016 | Best Costume Design | Madeline Fontaine | Runner-up | |
| San Diego Film Critics Society | December 12, 2016 | Best Use of Music in a Film | Jackie | Runner-up (Note: Tied with La La Land) | |
| San Francisco Film Critics Circle | December 11, 2016 | Best Actress | Natalie Portman | Nominated | |
| San Francisco Film Critics Circle | December 11, 2016 | Best Cinematography | Stéphane Fontaine | Nominated | |
| San Francisco Film Critics Circle | December 11, 2016 | Best Production Design | Jean Rabasse | Nominated | |
| San Francisco Film Critics Circle | December 11, 2016 | Best Original Score | Mica Levi | Won | |
| Satellite Awards | February 19, 2017 | Best Film | Jackie | Nominated | |
| Satellite Awards | February 19, 2017 | Best Director | Pablo Larraín | Nominated | |
| Satellite Awards | February 19, 2017 | Best Actress | Natalie Portman | Nominated | |
| Satellite Awards | February 19, 2017 | Best Art Direction and Production Design | Jean Rabasse | Nominated | |
| Satellite Awards | February 19, 2017 | Best Costume Design | Madeline Fontaine | Won | |
| Screen Actors Guild Awards | January 29, 2017 | Outstanding Performance by a Female Actor in a Leading Role | Natalie Portman | Nominated | |
| St. Louis Gateway Film Critics Association | December 18, 2016 | Best Actress | Natalie Portman | Runner-up | |
| St. Louis Gateway Film Critics Association | December 18, 2016 | Best Editing | Sebastián Sepúlveda | Won | |
| St. Louis Gateway Film Critics Association | December 18, 2016 | Best Production Design | Jean Rabasse | Runner-up (Note: Tied with David Wasco for La La Land and Stuart Craig for Fantastic Beasts and Where to Find Them) | |
| St. Louis Gateway Film Critics Association | December 18, 2016 | Best Music/Score | Mica Levi | Runner-up | |
| Toronto Film Critics Association | December 11, 2016 | Best Actress | Natalie Portman | Runner-up | |
| Toronto International Film Festival | September 18, 2016 | Platform Prize | Pablo Larraín | Won | |
| Vancouver Film Critics Circle | December 20, 2016 | Best Actress | Natalie Portman | Nominated | |
| Venice Film Festival | September 10, 2016 | Golden Osella for Best Original Screenplay | Noah Oppenheim | Won | |
| Venice Film Festival | September 10, 2016 | Golden Lion | Pablo Larraín | Nominated | |
| Washington D.C. Area Film Critics Association | December 5, 2016 | Best Actress | Natalie Portman | Won | |
| Washington D.C. Area Film Critics Association | December 5, 2016 | Best Art Direction | Véronique Melery and Jean Rabasse | Nominated | |
| Washington D.C. Area Film Critics Association | December 5, 2016 | Best Cinematography | Stéphane Fontaine | Nominated | |
| Washington D.C. Area Film Critics Association | December 5, 2016 | Best Score | Mica Levi | Nominated | |
| Washington D.C. Area Film Critics Association | December 5, 2016 | Best Editing | Sebastián Sepúlveda | Nominated | |
| Washington D.C. Area Film Critics Association | December 5, 2016 | Best Portrayal of Washington D.C. | Jackie | Won | |
| Women Film Critics Circle | December 19, 2016 | Best Actress | Natalie Portman | Won | |
| Women Film Critics Circle | December 19, 2016 | Best Line in a Movie | "I believe the characters we read on the page become more real than the men who stand beside us." | Won | |
