= 2016 Deauville American Film Festival =

- Festival poster
- Opening film: The Infiltrator
- Closing film: War Dogs
- Location: Deauville, France
- Hosted by: Deauville American Film Festival Group
- No. of films: 37 feature films
- Festival date: September 2, 2016–September 11, 2016
- Language: International
- Website: www.festival-deauville.com

The 42nd Deauville American Film Festival took place at Deauville, France from September 2 to 11, 2016. American crime drama film The Infiltrator by Brad Furman was selected as the opening night film, while Black dramedy War Dogs by Todd Phillips served as the closing night film of the festival. The Grand Prix was awarded to Little Men by Ira Sachs.

The festival paid tribute to James Franco, Michael Moore and Stanley Tucci. Chloë Grace Moretz and Daniel Radcliffe received Le Nouvel Hollywood (Hollywood Rising Star) awards.

== Juries ==
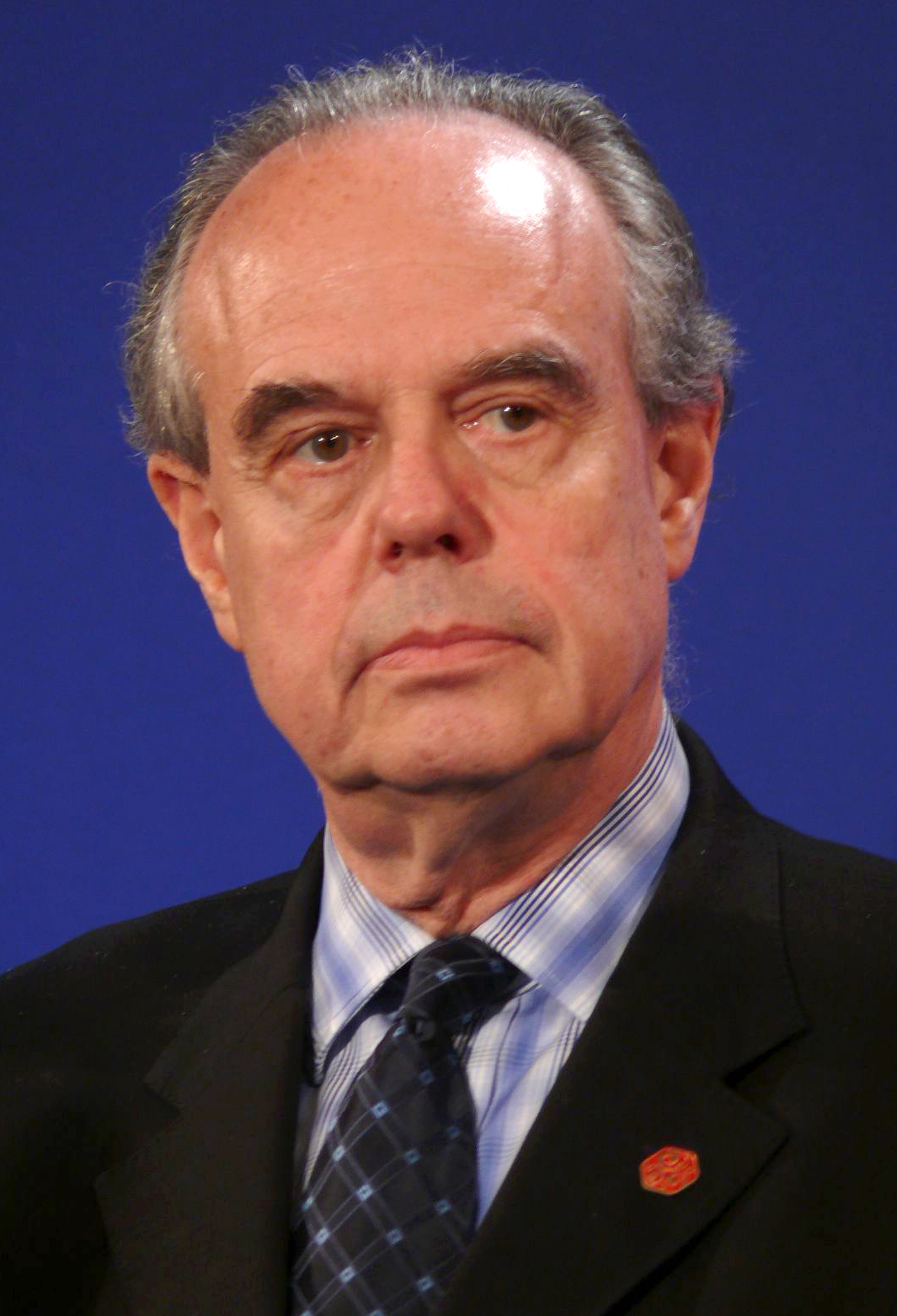
Frédéric Mitterrand, Main Jury President

=== Main Competition ===
- Frédéric Mitterrand: French actor, director, screenwriter and politician (President of Jury)
- Françoise Arnoul: French actress
- Éric Elmosnino: French actor and musician
- Ana Girardot: French actress
- Douglas Kennedy: American novelist
- Radu Mihăileanu: French screenwriter and director
- Emmanuel Mouret: French actor, director and screenwriter
- Marjane Satrapi: French novelist

=== Cartier revelation jury ===
- Audrey Pulvar: French journalist and TV host (President of Jury)
- Cédric Anger: French director and screenwriter
- Jérôme Bonnell: French director
- Kheiron: French actor and director
- Diane Rouxel: French actress
- Christa Theret: French actress

== Programme ==
=== Competition ===
- Captain Fantastic by Matt Ross
- Certain Women by Kelly Reichardt
- Christine by Antonio Campos
- Complete Unknown by Joshua Marston
- Goat by Andrew Neel
- Little Men by Ira Sachs
- Mean Dreams by Nathan Morlando
- Sing Street by John Carney
- Teenage Cocktail by John Carchietta
- The Fits by Anna Rose Holmer
- The Free World by Jason Lew
- The Transfiguration by Michael O'Shea
- Transpecos by Greg Kwedar
- Wiener-Dog by Todd Solondz

=== Les Premières (Premieres) ===
- And So It Goes by Rob Reiner
- Born to Be Blue by Robert Budreau
- Collide by Eran Creevy
- Eye in the Sky by Gavin Hood
- Frank & Lola by Matthew Ross
- Free State of Jones by Gary Ross
- Hell or High Water by David Mackenzie
- Imperium by Daniel Ragussis
- In Dubious Battle by James Franco
- The Infiltrator by Brad Furman
- Kubo and the Two Strings by Travis Knight
- Miles Ahead by Don Cheadle
- Mississippi Grind by Anna Boden and Ryan Fleck
- The History of Love by Radu Mihăileanu
- War Dogs by Todd Phillips
- War on Everyone by John Michael McDonagh

=== Les Docs De L'Oncle Sam (Uncle Sam's Doc) ===
- Close Encounters with Vilmos Zsigmond by Pierre Filmon
- Mapplethorpe: Look at the Pictures by Fenton Bailey and Randy Barbato
- Midnight Return: The Story of Billy Hayes and Turkey by Sally Sussman Morina
- Nuts! by Penny Lane
- The Bandit by Jesse Moss
- Where to Invade Next by Michael Moore
- Women who run Hollywood by Julia Kuperberg and Clara Kuperberg

=== Television ===
- The Night Of by Steven Zaillian and James Marsh

== Awards ==
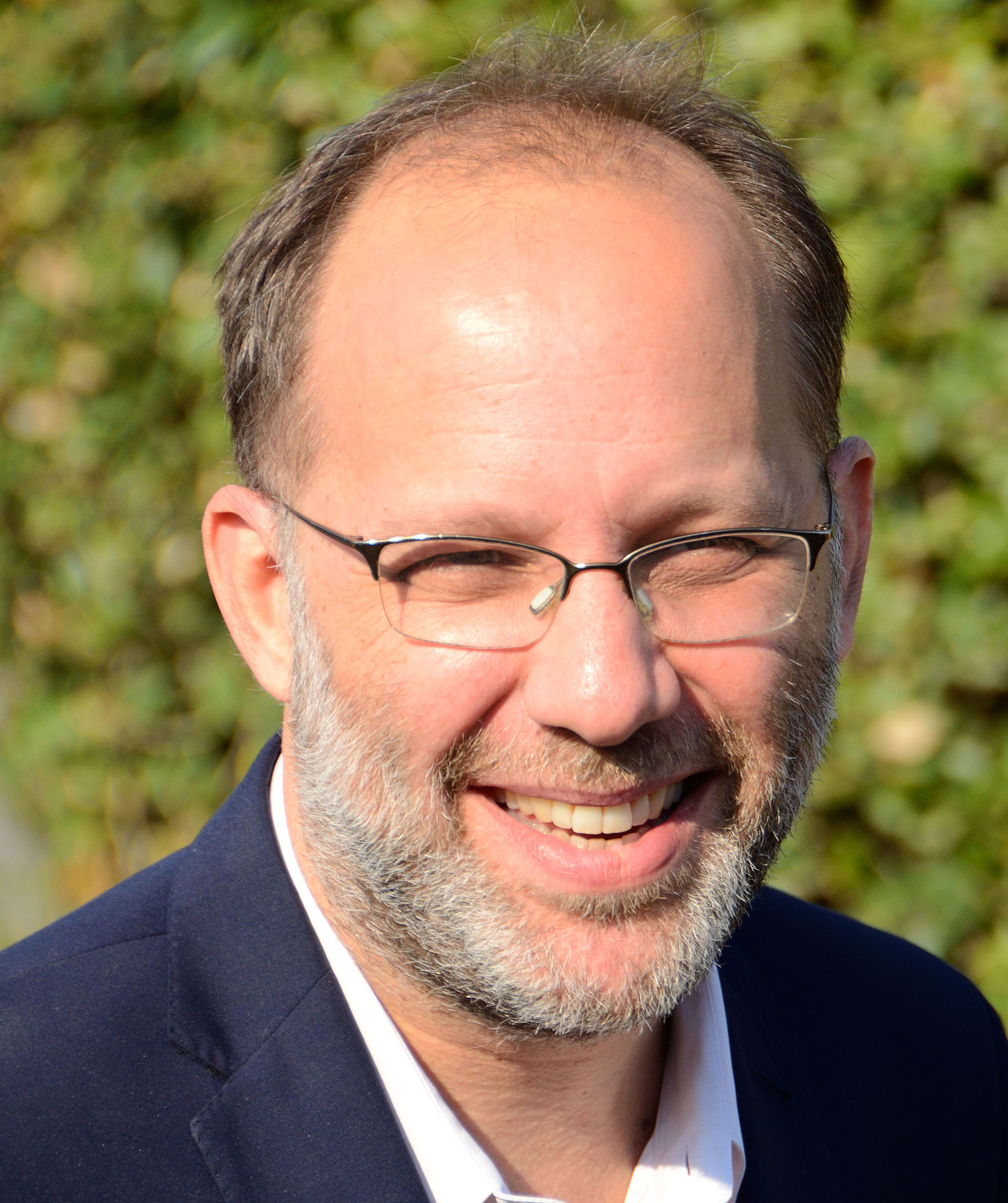
Ira Sachs, won Grand Prix at the festival.

The festival awarded the following awards:

- Grand Prix (Grand Special Prize): Little Men by Ira Sachs
- Prix du Jury (Jury Special Prize): Captain Fantastic by Matt Ross and Wiener-Dog by Todd Solondz
- Prix du Public (Audience Award): Captain Fantastic by Matt Ross
- Prix de la Critique Internationale (International Critics' prize): The Fits by Anna Rose Holmer
- Prix Michel d'Ornano (Michel d'Ornano Award for debut French film): Willy 1er by Ludovic Boukherma, Zoran Boukherma, Marielle Gautier and Hugo P. Thomas
- Prix de la Révélation Cartier (Cartier Revelation Prize): Wiener-Dog by Todd Solondz
- Lucien Barrière Prize for Literature:
  - West of Sunset by Stewart O'Nan
- Tributes:
  - James Franco
  - Michael Moore
  - Stanley Tucci
- Le Nouvel Hollywood (Hollywood Rising Star):
  - Chloë Grace Moretz
  - Daniel Radcliffe
