= Gotham Independent Film Awards 2016 =

Annual US film awards ceremony

26th Annual Gotham Independent Film Awards
- Date: November 28, 2016
- Country: United States
- Presented by: Independent Filmmaker Project
- Hosted by: Keegan-Michael Key

Highlights
- Most wins: Moonlight (3)
- Most nominations: Manchester by the Sea (5)
- Best Feature: Moonlight
- Breakthrough Director: Trey Edward Shults – Krisha
- Website: https://gotham.ifp.org

The 26th Annual Gotham Independent Film Awards, presented by the Independent Filmmaker Project, were held on November 28, 2016. The nominees were announced on October 20, 2016. Actors Ethan Hawke and Amy Adams, director Oliver Stone and producer Arnon Milchan received tribute awards. The ceremony was hosted by Keegan-Michael Key.

== Winners and nominees ==
=== Film ===
Best Feature: Moonlight; Certain Women; Everybody Wants Some!!; Manchester by the Sea; Paterson	Best Documentary Feature: O.J.: Made in America; Cameraperson; I Am Not Your Negro; Tower; Weiner
Breakthrough Director: Trey Edward Shults – Krisha; Robert Eggers – The Witch; Anna Rose Holmer – The Fits; Daniel Kwan and Daniel Scheinert – Swiss Army Man; Richard Tanne – Southside with You	Breakthrough Actor: Anya Taylor-Joy – The Witch as Thomasin; Lily Gladstone – Certain Women as Jamie; Lucas Hedges – Manchester by the Sea as Patrick Chandler; Royalty Hightower – The Fits as Toni; Sasha Lane – American Honey as Star
Best Actor: Casey Affleck – Manchester by the Sea as Lee Chandler; Jeff Bridges – Hell or High Water as Marcus Hamilton; Adam Driver – Paterson as Paterson; Joel Edgerton – Loving as Richard Loving; Craig Robinson – Morris from America as Curtis Gentry	Best Actress: Isabelle Huppert – Elle as Michèle Leblanc; Kate Beckinsale – Love & Friendship as Lady Susan Vernon; Annette Bening – 20th Century Women as Dorothea Field; Ruth Negga – Loving as Mildred Loving; Natalie Portman – Jackie as Jacqueline Kennedy Onassis
Best Screenplay: Barry Jenkins and Tarell Alvin McCraney – Moonlight; Taylor Sheridan – Hell or High Water; Whit Stillman – Love & Friendship; Kenneth Lonergan – Manchester by the Sea; Jim Jarmusch – Paterson	Audience Award: Moonlight; Cameraperson; Certain Women; Everybody Wants Some!!; The Fits; I Am Not Your Negro; Krisha; Manchester by the Sea; O.J.: Made in America; Paterson; Southside with You; Swiss Army Man; Tower; Weiner; The Witch

=== Television ===
Breakthrough Series – Long Form: Crazy Ex-Girlfriend; The Girlfriend Experience; Horace and Pete; Marvel's Jessica Jones; Master of None	Breakthrough Series – Short Form: Her Story; The Gay and Wondrous Life of Caleb Gallo; The Movement; Sitting in Bathrooms with Trans People; Surviving

== Special awards ==
=== Special Jury Award – Ensemble Performance ===
- Moonlight – Mahershala Ali, Naomie Harris, Alex Hibbert, André Holland, Jharrel Jerome, Janelle Monáe, Jaden Piner, Trevante Rhodes, and Ashton Sanders

=== Spotlight on Women Filmmakers "Live the Dream" Grant ===
- Roxy Toporowych – Julia Blue
  - Shaz Bennett – Alaska is a Drag
  - Katie Orr – Poor Jane

=== Made in NY Award ===
- Aziz Ansari
- Judith Light

=== Gotham Appreciation Award ===
- Mayor's Office of Media and Entertainment (MOME)

=== Gotham Tributes ===
- Amy Adams
- Ethan Hawke
- Arnon Milchan
- Oliver Stone
