= National Board of Review Awards 2016 =

Annual US film awards ceremony

88th NBR Awards
Best Film: Manchester by the Sea

The 88th National Board of Review Awards, honoring the best in film for 2016, were announced on November 29, 2016.

== Top 10 Films ==
Films listed alphabetically except top, which is ranked as Best Film of the Year:

Manchester by the Sea

- Arrival
- Hacksaw Ridge
- Hail, Caesar!
- Hell or High Water
- Hidden Figures
- La La Land
- Moonlight
- Patriots Day
- Silence
- Sully

== Winners ==
Best Film:

- Manchester by the Sea

Best Director:

- Barry Jenkins – Moonlight

Best Actor:

- Casey Affleck – Manchester by the Sea

Best Actress:

- Amy Adams – Arrival

Best Supporting Actor:

- Jeff Bridges – Hell or High Water

Best Supporting Actress:

- Naomie Harris – Moonlight

Best Original Screenplay:

- Kenneth Lonergan – Manchester by the Sea

Best Adapted Screenplay:

- Jay Cocks and Martin Scorsese – Silence

Best Animated Feature:

- Kubo and the Two Strings

Best Foreign Language Film:

- The Salesman

Best Documentary:

- O.J.: Made in America

Best Ensemble:

- Hidden Figures

Breakthrough Male Performance:

- Lucas Hedges – Manchester by the Sea

Breakthrough Female Performance:

- Royalty Hightower – The Fits

Best Directorial Debut:

- Trey Edward Shults – Krisha

Spotlight Award:

- Creative collaboration of Peter Berg and Mark Wahlberg

NBR Freedom of Expression:

- Cameraperson

== Top Foreign Films ==
The Salesman

- Elle
- The Handmaiden
- Julieta
- Land of Mine
- Neruda

== Top Documentaries ==
O.J.: Made in America

- De Palma
- The Eagle Huntress
- Gleason
- Life, Animated
- Miss Sharon Jones!

== Top Independent Films ==
- 20th Century Women
- Captain Fantastic
- Creative Control
- Eye in the Sky
- The Fits
- Green Room
- Hello, My Name Is Doris
- Krisha
- Morris from America
- Sing Street
