= Cameraperson =

- Directed by: Kirsten Johnson
- Written by: Doris Baizley; Lisa Freedman
- Produced by: Kirsten Johnson; Marilyn Ness
- Starring: Kirsten Johnson
- Cinematography: Kirsten Johnson
- Edited by: Nels Bangerter; David Teague (consulting editor)
- Music by: Wellington Bowler; Carla Kihlstedt; Dino Rešidbegović
- Production companies: Big Mouth Productions; Fork Films
- Distributed by: Janus Films
- Release dates: 26 January 2016 (Sundance); 9 September 2016 (United States)
- Running time: 102 minutes
- Country: United States
- Language: English
- Box office: $102,033

Cameraperson is a 2016 autobiographical collage documentary film. The film is an account by director Kirsten Johnson about her life and career as a cinematographer. It relies on footage shot by Johnson across the years in numerous different countries.

Cameraperson premiered at the Sundance Film Festival to critical acclaim and won the top prize at the Sheffield Doc/Fest.

== Reception ==
Cameraperson has a 100% rating on Rotten Tomatoes based on 106 reviews, with an average score of 8.6/10; the site's consensus reads: "Fresh and inventive yet immediately accessible, Cameraperson distills its subject's life and career into an experience that should prove immediately absorbing even for those unfamiliar with her work." On Metacritic, the film has a weighted average score of 89 out of 100, based on 21 critics, indicating "universal acclaim".

=== Accolades ===
As of January 2017, Cameraperson has won 23 international awards, including the following:

Award	Date of ceremony	Category	Recipients	Result
Boston Online Film Critics Association	10 December 2016	Best Documentary	Cameraperson	Won
Boston Online Film Critics Association	10 December 2016	Best Editing	Nels Bangerter	Won
Boston Society of Film Critics	11 December 2016	Best Editing	Nels Bangerter	Won
Camden International Film Festival	10 September 2016	Best Documentary Feature	Kirsten Johnson	Won
Camerimage	19 November 2016	Best Feature Documentary Film	Kirsten Johnson	Nominated
Central Ohio Film Critics Association		Best Documentary	Cameraperson	Nominated
Chicago Film Critics Association	15 December 2016	Best Documentary	Cameraperson	Nominated
Chicago Film Critics Association	15 December 2016	Best Editing	Nels Bangerter	Nominated
Cinema Eye Honors Awards, US	11 January 2017	The Unforgettables	Kirsten Johnson	Won
Cinema Eye Honors Awards, US	11 January 2017	Outstanding Achievement in Nonfiction Feature Filmmaking	Kirsten Johnson	Won
Cinema Eye Honors Awards, US	11 January 2017	Outstanding Achievement in Nonfiction Feature Filmmaking	Marilyn Ness	Won
Cinema Eye Honors Awards, US	11 January 2017	Outstanding Achievement in Direction	Kirsten Johnson	Nominated
Cinema Eye Honors Awards, US	11 January 2017	Outstanding Achievement in Editing	Nels Bangerter	Won
Cinema Eye Honors Awards, US	11 January 2017	Outstanding Achievement in Cinematography	Kirsten Johnson	Won
Critics' Choice Documentary Awards	3 November 2016	Most Compelling Living Subject of a Documentary	Kirsten Johnson	Won
Critics' Choice Documentary Awards	3 November 2016	Best Documentary Feature	Cameraperson	Nominated
Critics' Choice Documentary Awards	3 November 2016	Best Director (Theatrical Feature)	Kirsten Johnson	Nominated
Critics' Choice Documentary Awards	3 November 2016	Most Innovative Documentary	Cameraperson	Nominated
DOXA Documentary Film Festival	15 May 2016	Feature Documentary Award	Kirsten Johnson	Won
Florida Film Critics Circle	23 December 2016	Best Documentary	Cameraperson	Won
Gotham Awards	28 November 2016	Best Documentary	Cameraperson	Nominated
Independent Spirit Awards	25 February 2017	Best Documentary Feature	Cameraperson	Nominated
IndieWire Critics Poll	19 December 2016	Best Documentary	Cameraperson	Runner-up
IndieWire Critics Poll	19 December 2016	Best Editing	Nels Bangerter	4th Place
IndieWire Critics Poll	19 December 2016	Best Cinematography	Kirsten Johnson	9th Place
IndieWire Critics Poll	19 December 2016	Best First Feature	Kirsten Johnson	10th Place
International Documentary Association	9 December 2016	Best Feature	Kirsten Johnson	Nominated
International Documentary Association	9 December 2016	Best Editing	Nels Bangerter	Won
Montclair Film Festival	8 May 2016	Bruce Sinofsky Prize for Documentary Feature	Kirsten Johnson	Won
National Board of Review	29 November 2016	Freedom of Expression Award	Cameraperson	Won
Online Film Critics Society	3 January 2017	Best Documentary Film	Cameraperson	Nominated
RiverRun International Film Festival	17 April 2016	Special Jury Prize - Documentary Feature	Kirsten Johnson	Won
San Francisco Film Critics Circle	11 December 2016	Best Documentary Film	Kirsten Johnson	Nominated
San Francisco International Film Festival	5 May 2016	Best Documentary Feature	Kirsten Johnson	Won
Sarasota Film Festival	9 April 2016	Jury Prize - Best Documentary Feature	Kirsten Johnson	Won
Seattle Film Critics Association		Best Documentary Feature	Kirsten Johnson	Nominated
Sheffield Doc/Fest	19 June 2016	Grand Jury Award	Kirsten Johnson	Won
Toronto Film Critics Association	11 December 2016	Best Documentary Film	Kirsten Johnson	Won
Traverse City Film Festival	31 July 2016	Founders Prize - Best US Documentary	Kirsten Johnson	Won
Utah Film Critics Association	18 December 2016	Best Documentary Feature	Cameraperson	Won
Vancouver Film Critics Circle	20 December 2016	Best Documentary	Cameraperson	Won
Zurich Film Festival	25 September 2016	Best International Documentary Film	Kirsten Johnson	Nominated

== Home media ==
As it was distributed by Janus Films, Cameraperson received a Blu-ray and DVD release on 7 February 2017 by The Criterion Collection, a sister company of Janus.
