= Chicago Film Critics Association Awards 2016 =

Annual US film awards ceremony

29th Chicago Film Critics Association Awards
- Date: December 15, 2016
- Site: Chicago, Illinois U.S.

Highlights
- Best Film: Moonlight
- Most awards: Manchester by the Sea (4)
- Most nominations: Moonlight (11)

The 29th Chicago Film Critics Association Awards were announced on December 15, 2016. The awards honor the best in film for 2016. The nominations were announced on December 11. Moonlight received the most nominations (11), followed by Jackie (8), Manchester by the Sea (8), and La La Land (7).

== Winners and nominees ==
The winners and nominees for the 29th Chicago Film Critics Association Awards are as follows:

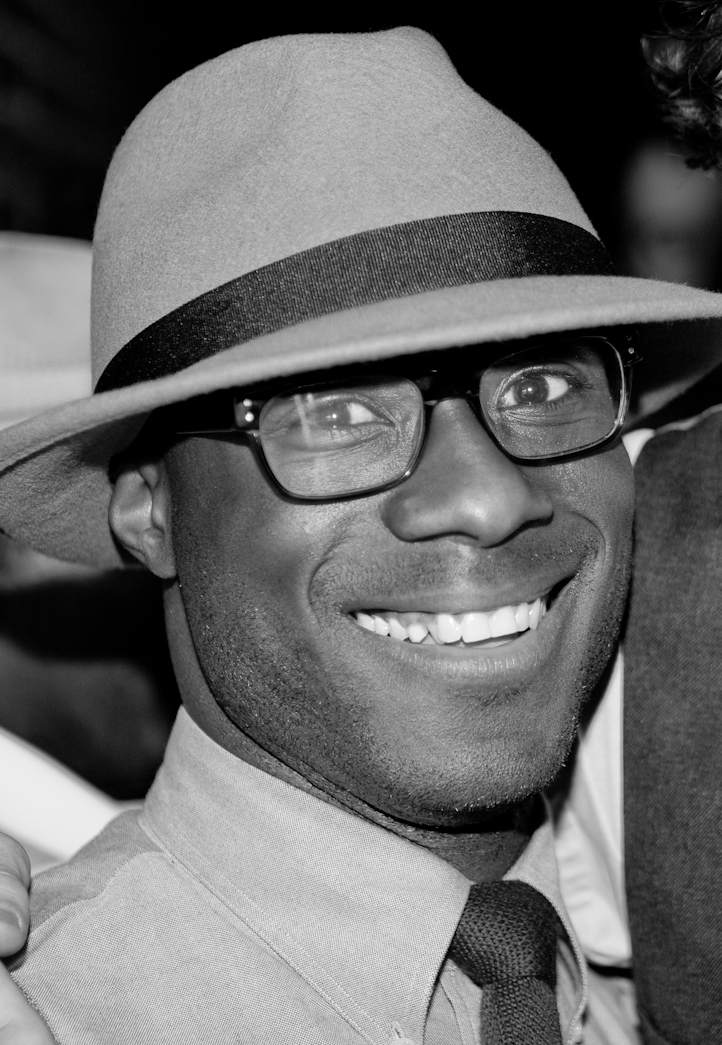
Barry Jenkins, Best Director winner

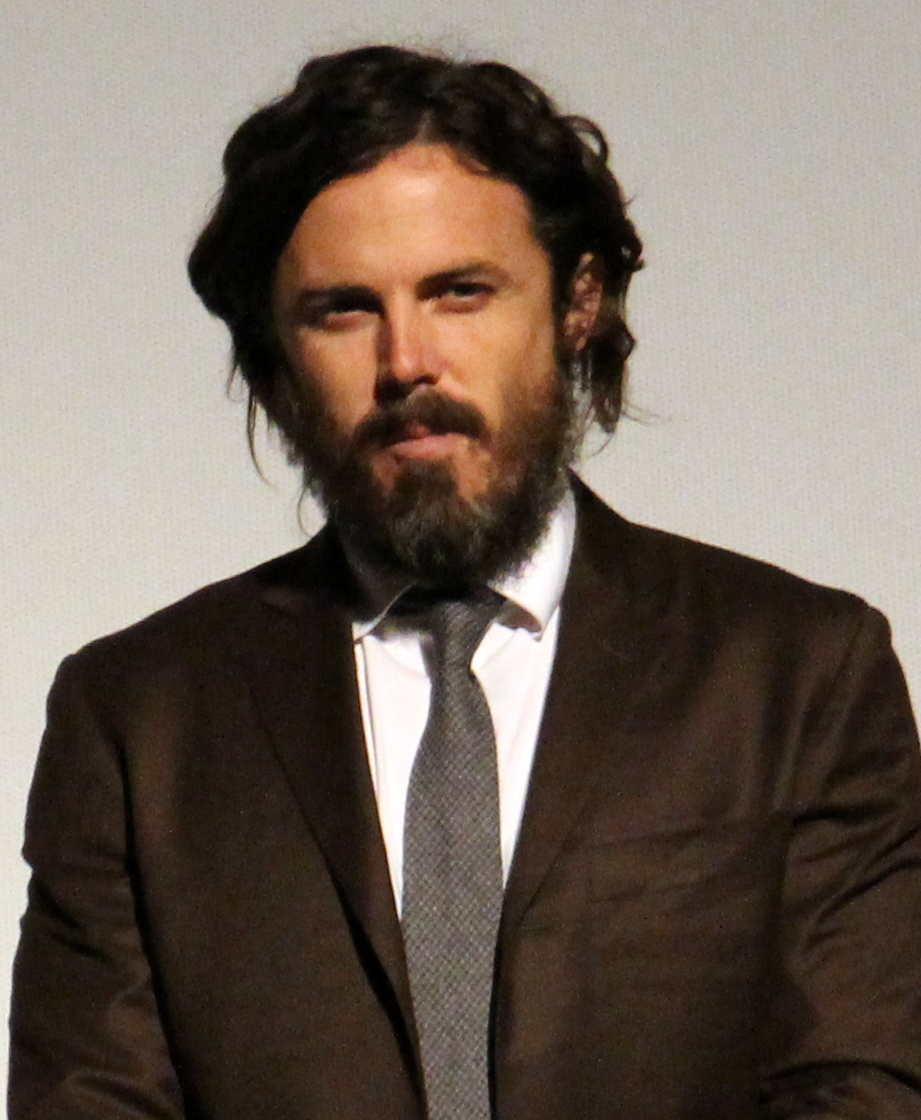
Casey Affleck, Best Actor winner

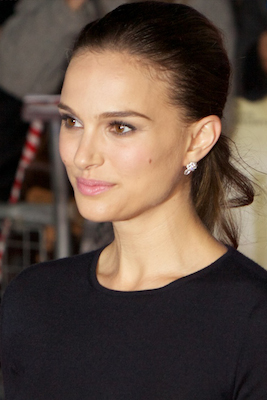
Natalie Portman, Best Actress winner

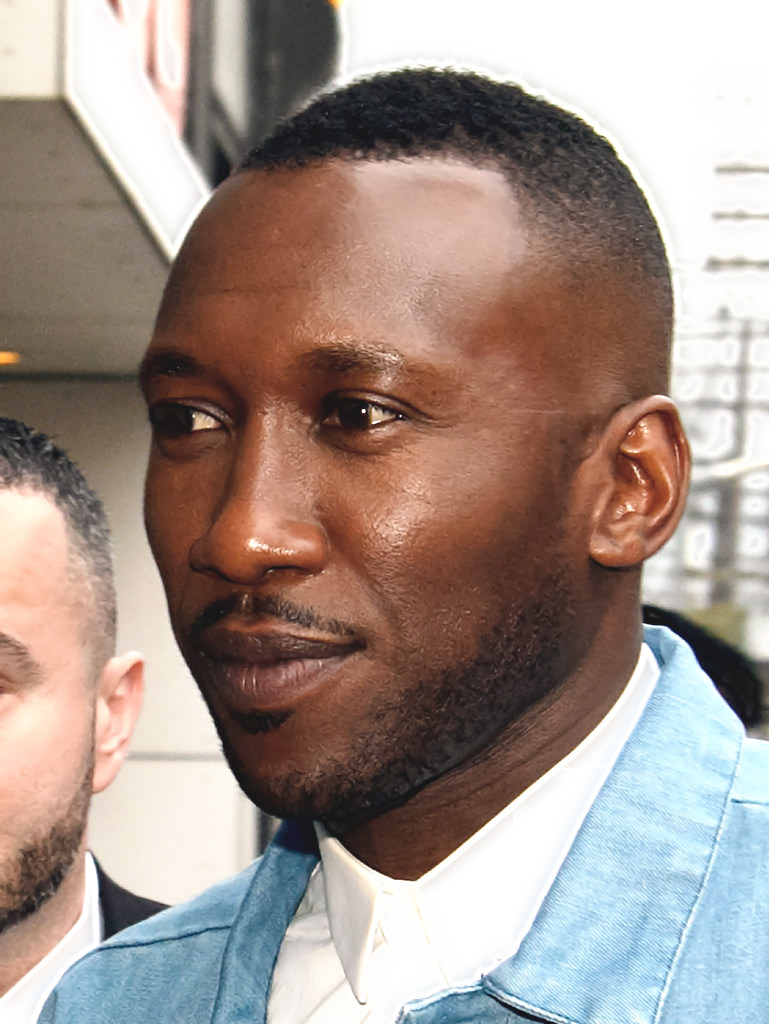
Mahershala Ali, Best Supporting Actor winner

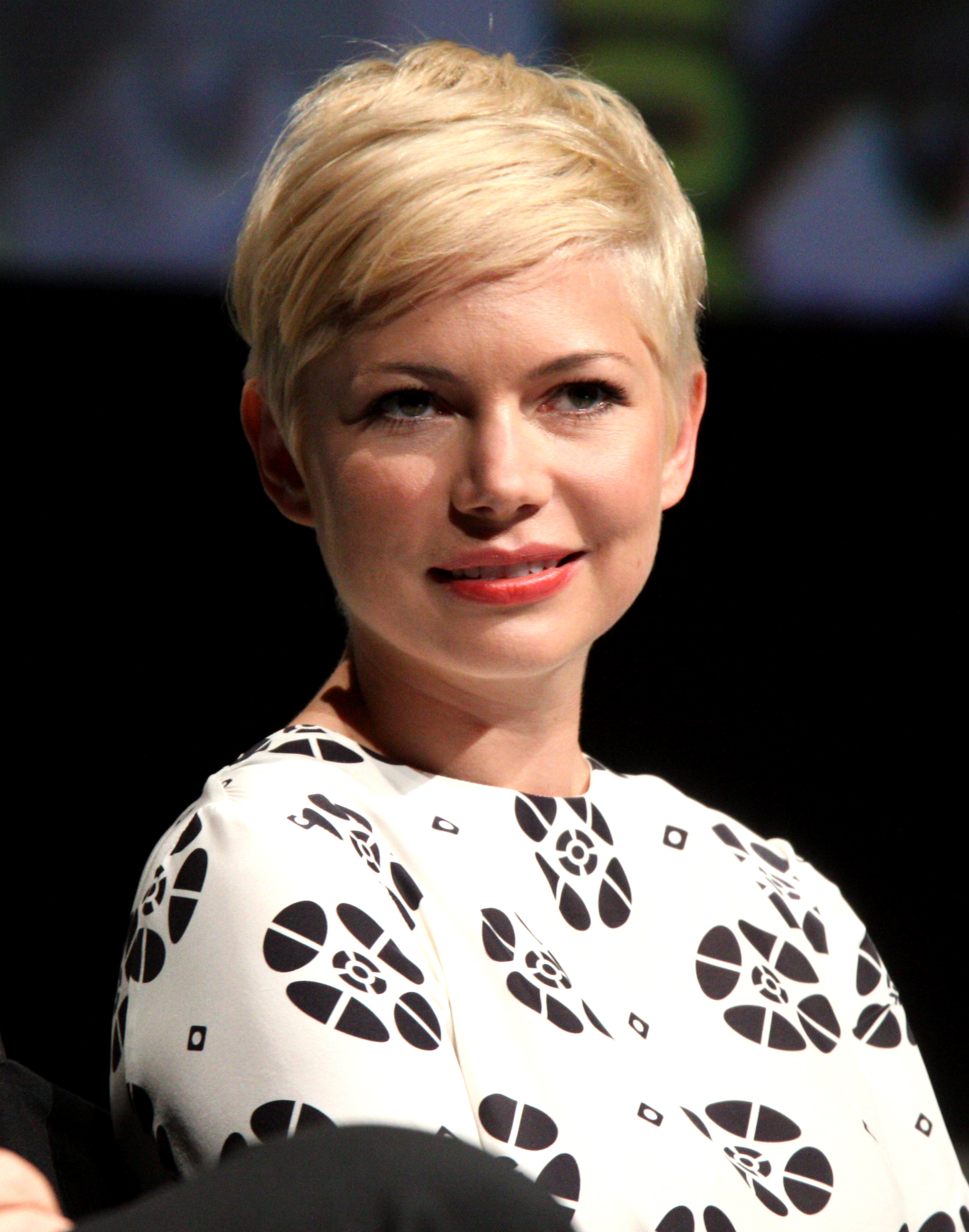
Michelle Williams, Best Supporting Actress winner

=== Awards ===
Best Film	Best Director
Moonlight - Adele Romanski, Dede Gardner and Jeremy Kleiner: The Handmaiden - Park Chan-wook and Syd Lim; Jackie -; La La Land - Fred Berger, Jordan Horowitz and Marc Platt; Manchester by the Sea - Matt Damon, Kimberly Steward, Chris Moore, Lauren Beck and Kevin J. Walsh	Barry Jenkins – Moonlight: Damien Chazelle – La La Land; Pablo Larraín – Jackie; Kenneth Lonergan – Manchester by the Sea; Chan-wook Park – The Handmaiden
Best Actor	Best Actress
Casey Affleck – Manchester by the Sea as Lee Chandler: Adam Driver – Paterson as Paterson; Joel Edgerton – Loving as Richard Loving; Colin Farrell – The Lobster as David; Denzel Washington – Fences as Troy Maxson	Natalie Portman – Jackie as Jackie Kennedy: Amy Adams – Arrival as Louise Banks; Rebecca Hall – Christine as Christine Chubbuck; Isabelle Huppert – Elle as Michele Leblanc; Emma Stone – La La Land as Mia Dolan
Best Supporting Actor	Best Supporting Actress
Mahershala Ali – Moonlight as Juan: Alden Ehrenreich – Hail, Caesar! as Hobie Doyle; Ben Foster – Hell or High Water as Tanner Howard; Lucas Hedges – Manchester by the Sea as Patrick Chandler; Trevante Rhodes – Moonlight as Chiron; Michael Shannon – Nocturnal Animals as Detective Bobby Andes	Michelle Williams – Manchester by the Sea as Randi Chandler: Viola Davis – Fences as Rose Maxson; Lily Gladstone – Certain Women as Jamie; Naomie Harris – Moonlight as Paula; Janelle Monáe – Hidden Figures as Mary Jackson
Best Original Screenplay	Best Adapted Screenplay
Manchester by the Sea – Written by Kenneth Lonergan: Hell or High Water – Written by Taylor Sheridan; Jackie – Written by Noah Oppenheim; The Lobster – Written by Yorgos Lanthimos and Efthimis Filippou; Moonlight – Written by Barry Jenkins	The Handmaiden – Seo-Kyung Chung and Chan-wook Park based on the novel Fingersmith by author Sarah Waters: Arrival – by Eric Heisserer based on the story "Story of Your Life" by Ted Chiang; Elle – by David Birke based on the novel Oh... by Philippe Djian; Love & Friendship – by Whit Stillman based on the novel Lady Susan by Jane Austen; Silence – by Jay Cocks and Martin Scorsese based on the book by Shusaku Endo
Best Animated Film	Best Foreign Language Film
Kubo and the Two Strings - Travis Knight and Arianne Sutner: Moana - John Musker, Ron Clements and Osnat Shurer; The Red Turtle - Michael Dudok de Wit and Toshio Suzuki; Tower; Zootopia - Byron Howard, Rich Moore and Clark Spencer	The Handmaiden (South Korea) in Japanese - Directed by Park Chan-wook: Elle (France) in French - Directed by Paul Verhoeven; Julieta (Spain) in Spanish - Directed by Pedro Almodovar; Neruda (Spain) in Spanish - Directed by Pablo Larrain; Toni Erdmann (Germany) by German - Directed by Maren Ade
Best Documentary Film	Best Original Score
O.J.: Made in America - Ezra Edelman and Caroline Waterlow: Cameraperson - Kirsten Johnson and Marilyn Ness; Life, Animated - Roger Ross Williams and Julie Goldman; Tower - Keith Matiland, Susan Thomson and Megan Gilbride; Weiner - Josh Kriegman and Elyse Steinberg	Jackie – Mica Levi: Arrival – Jóhann Jóhannsson; La La Land – Justin Hurwitz; Moonlight – Nicholas Britell; The Neon Demon – Cliff Martinez
Best Production Design	Best Editing
The Handmaiden - Production Designer: Seong-hie Ryu; Set Decorator: -: Jackie - Production Design: Halina Gebarowicz, Mathieu Junot and Emmanuel Prevot; Set Decorator: -; La La Land - Production Designer: Austin Gorg; Set Decorator: David Agajanian; The Neon Demon - Production Designer: Austin Gorg; Set Decorator: -; The Witch - Production Designer: Andrea Kristof; Set Decorator: -	La La Land – Tom Cross: Cameraperson – Nels Bangerter; Jackie – Sebastián Sepúlveda; Manchester by the Sea – Jennifer Lame; Moonlight – Joi McMillon and Nat Sanders
Best Cinematography	
La La Land – Linus Sandgren: The Handmaiden – Chung-hoon Chung; Jackie – Stéphane Fontaine; Moonlight – James Laxton; Silence – Rodrigo Prieto
Most Promising Filmmaker	Most Promising Performer
Robert Eggers – The Witch: Kelly Fremon Craig – The Edge of Seventeen; Anna Rose Holmer – The Fits; Travis Knight – Kubo and the Two Strings; Trey Edward Shults – Krisha	Lucas Hedges – Manchester by the Sea as Patrick Chandler: Lily Gladstone – Certain Women as Jamie; Royalty Hightower – The Fits as Toni; Janelle Monáe – Hidden Figures as Mary Jackson and Moonlight as Teresa; Trevante Rhodes – Moonlight as Chiron

== Awards breakdown ==
The following films received multiple nominations:

Nominations	Film
11	Moonlight
8	Jackie
8	Manchester by the Sea
7	La La Land
6	The Handmaiden
3	Arrival
3	Elle
2	Silence
2	Kubo and the Two Strings
2	Hidden Figures
2	The Witch
2	The Lobster
2	Fences
2	Certain Women
2	The Fits

The following films received multiple wins:

Wins	Film
4	Manchester by the Sea
3	Moonlight
3	The Handmaiden
2	Jackie
2	La La Land
