= Love & Friendship =

2016 period film directed by Whit Stillman

- Theatrical release poster
- Directed by: Whit Stillman
- Screenplay by: Whit Stillman
- Based on: Lady Susan by Jane Austen
- Produced by: Whit Stillman; Katie Holly; Lauranne Bourrachot
- Starring: Kate Beckinsale; Xavier Samuel; Emma Greenwell; Morfydd Clark; Jemma Redgrave; Tom Bennett; James Fleet; Justin Edwards; Jenn Murray; Stephen Fry; Chloë Sevigny
- Cinematography: Richard Van Oosterhout
- Edited by: Sophie Corra
- Music by: Mark Suozzo
- Production companies: Blinder Films; Chic Films; Revolver Films; Westerly Films
- Distributed by: Sophie Dulac Distribution (France); Cinéart (Netherlands); Lionsgate (United Kingdom)
- Release dates: 23 January 2016 (Sundance); 13 May 2016 (United States)
- Running time: 93 minutes
- Countries: Netherlands; France; Ireland
- Language: English
- Budget: $3 million
- Box office: $23.9 million

Love & Friendship is a 2016 period romantic comedy-drama film written and directed by Whit Stillman. Based on Jane Austen's epistolary novel Lady Susan, written c. 1794, the film stars Kate Beckinsale, Chloë Sevigny, Xavier Samuel, and Emma Greenwell. The film follows recently widowed Lady Susan in her intrepid and calculating exploits to secure suitably wealthy husbands for her daughter and herself. Although adapted from Lady Susan, the film was produced under the borrowed title of Austen's juvenile story Love and Freindship.

The film premiered at the 2016 Sundance Film Festival. Released theatrically on 13 May 2016, by Roadside Attractions and Amazon Studios in North America, the film received positive reviews and grossed $23.9 million.

== Plot ==
In the 1790s, the recently widowed and relatively young Lady Susan Vernon seeks a wealthy match for her only daughter, Frederica, and a wealthy husband for herself, to renew her fortunes. After being turned out of the Manwaring estate due to her dalliance with the married Lord Manwaring, she and her unpaid companion Mrs Cross head to Churchill, the country home of her brother-in-law (her late husband's brother), Charles Vernon, and his wife Catherine Vernon (née DeCourcy). Lady Susan frankly discusses her plans during visits to her trusted friend, the American Mrs Johnson.

Catherine and her younger brother, Reginald DeCourcy, are aware of Lady Susan's reputation as a determined and accomplished flirt. Under the influence of the amiable but dull Charles, Reginald agrees to keep an open mind, and soon finds himself enchanted with Lady Susan. When Reginald's father, Sir Reginald DeCourcy, learns of this, he warns Reginald against marrying Lady Susan lest the family name be sullied. Reginald says their relationship is not romantic; however, he and Lady Susan soon reach a romantic understanding.

Lady Susan's daughter, Frederica, who has been attending a boarding school which her mother cannot afford, runs away and is expelled. Frederica arrives at Churchill followed by Sir James Martin, who is both very wealthy and foolish. For example, upon arrival at Churchill, he explains that he struggled to find the estate as he had been looking for "church hill", a church and/or a hill.

Frederica confides in Reginald that she does not want to marry Sir James because he is "silly", but she fears her mother's determination to marry her off. Surprised, he decides to take up Frederica's case with Lady Susan and, after their confrontation, he decides to leave. However, Lady Susan smooths things over with him, then plots to punish him for his disloyalty.

When both Lady Susan and Reginald are in London, she seeks to delay their marriage, saying society does not yet approve of them (presumably because she is much older). Then, Lady Susan's relationship with Lord Manwaring is exposed when Lady Manwaring discovers the lovers are meeting in private, facilitated by Lady Susan's friend Mrs Johnson. Lady Manwaring appeals to her guardian, Mr Johnson, to confront them.

Reginald arrives with a letter from Lady Susan to Mrs Johnson and overhears Lady Manwaring crying. She emerges with Mr Johnson, who says he cannot help her, and in desperation she snatches the letter Mrs Johnson holds, recognising the handwriting. She insists her husband is with Lady Susan, but Reginald claims he has just left her, and she is "completely alone" for even the servants have been dismissed. Lady Manwaring is suspicious and demands a footman tell her what he saw at the house. He says, after Reginald and the servants left, he saw Lord Manwaring arrive and enter the house.

Lady Manwaring reads the letter which reveals Lady Susan asking her friend Mrs Johnson to welcome Reginald into her house and "keep him there all evening if you can, Manwaring comes this very hour". Reginald departs in anger and Mr Johnson berates his wife for her involvement with Lady Susan (who later says of him, he is "too old to be governable and too young to die").

Narrowly missing a departing Lord Manwaring, Reginald confronts Lady Susan, who says they cannot be married after all as he doubts her word and cannot trust her.

Reginald returns to his sister Catherine's home. Lady Susan marries Sir James, and Reginald falls in love with Frederica, and the two are soon married. Later, Sir James confides to Mrs Johnson his joy at the prospect of becoming a father, having been informed on the day after his marriage that his new wife is with child.

Sir James goes on to speak fondly of his newfound friend and long-term houseguest, Lord Manwaring, who was invited to stay by Lady Susan, and with whom he shares a love of hunting.

== Cast ==
- Kate Beckinsale as Lady Susan Vernon
- Chloë Sevigny as Alicia Johnson
- Xavier Samuel as Reginald DeCourcy
- Stephen Fry as Mr. Johnson
- Emma Greenwell as Catherine DeCourcy Vernon
- Morfydd Clark as Frederica Vernon
- James Fleet as Sir Reginald DeCourcy
- Jemma Redgrave as Lady DeCourcy
- Tom Bennett as Sir James Martin
- Justin Edwards as Charles Vernon
- Jenn Murray as Lady Manwaring
- Lochlann O'Mearáin as Lord Manwaring
- Sophie Radermacher as Miss Maria Manwaring
- Kelly Campbell as Mrs. Cross
- Conor MacNeill as The Young Curate

== Production ==
=== Conception and development ===
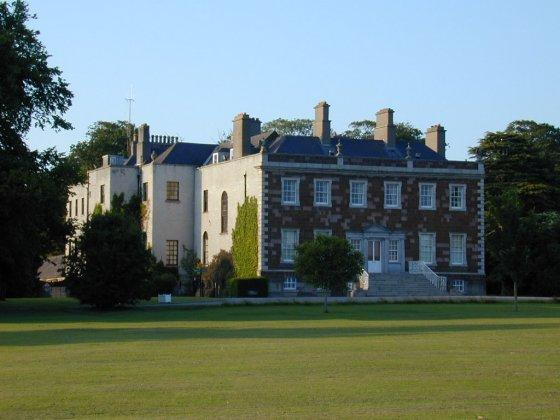
Location filming took place at the Newbridge Estate in Ireland.

In May 2013, Whit Stillman announced his plans to shoot a period comedy. In July, it was confirmed that Stillman was filming an adaptation of Jane Austen's Lady Susan, titled Love & Friendship. Stillman hoped to shoot the film in Britain or Ireland. Unlike other Austen novels, Lady Susan has rarely been adapted for the screen. In the late 1990s, after he had finished reading Austen's Northanger Abbey, Stillman found Lady Susan was included in the same edition and he became "fascinated" with the story, believing it "was too good not to be known". Stillman thought the novel had some good features, but was inaccessible, causing it to be overlooked by filmmakers. During interviews at the International Film Festival Rotterdam screening of the film, Stillman said that although the literary influences for the film were clearly taken from Jane Austen, the film's cinematographic influences were developed from the Michael Caine and Steve Martin film Dirty Rotten Scoundrels.

=== Casting ===
In February 2014, Amanda Dobbins of New York magazine reported actress Sienna Miller had been cast as Lady Susan, while Chloë Sevigny would play Susan's close friend Alicia. Miller later left the project and Kate Beckinsale replaced her as Lady Susan in 2015. Beckinsale and Sevigny previously worked together on Stillman's The Last Days of Disco. Xavier Samuel and Stephen Fry joined the cast as Reginald and Mr. Johnson respectively. Other cast members include Emma Greenwell as Catherine Vernon, Morfydd Clark as Frederica, Jemma Redgrave as Lady DeCourcy, James Fleet as Sir Reginald DeCourcy, Tom Bennett as Sir James Martin and Justin Edwards as Charles Vernon. Stillman later confirmed that Clark was the first actor to be cast, followed by Fleet and Redgrave. The director said he met with two other actors for the part of Sir James Martin, before Bennett was cast in the role.

Emily St. James writing for Vox referred to the successful aspects of Stillman's casting for the film stating:

Love & Friendship is filled with (casting) ringers. Stephen Fry pops up in what amounts to a one-scene cameo, and he's wickedly funny. Chloë Sevigny is great as his wife, Susan's American friend who finds herself constantly dealing with the protagonist's latest schemes. And Xavier Samuel is deliciously oblivious as the young man Susan tries to wed. But even the actors you've never heard of give wonderful performances. Love & Friendship marks one of Morfydd Clark's first film roles, and as Frederica she manages to transform the character's innocence into the basis for comedy instead of just a metaphor for everything Susan might destroy. That same level of skill is evident in every member of the ensemble.

=== Filming ===
The film received funding from Arte, the Irish Film Board, and the Netherlands Film Fund. Principal photography was originally scheduled to begin in the summer of 2014, but started on 2 February 2015 in Dublin. Filming also took place in the coastal town of Donabate, and at Russborough House, which was used as the exterior for two different residences in the film, and at Howth Castle, which featured as the exterior of 'Churchill'. For three weeks, scenes were shot on-location at the Newbridge Estate. On 16 March 2015, it was announced that filming on the production had wrapped. In a thirty-minute interview for AOL Build released on 12 May 2016 on YouTube between Stillman and Beckinsale, Beckinsale indicated that filming was completed in 27 days. The film's assembly edit took place at the EGG Post Production house in Dublin, and continued in France and the Netherlands.

=== Costume design ===
Irish costume designer Eimer Ní Mhaoldomhnaigh designed the clothing for the film. She used bold colours to show Lady Susan's transition from a widow in mourning to "a confident society lady". When the character is in the countryside, she wears mostly black, grey and mauve clothing, matching the mourning clothes of the period, but once she is in London, the colours become brighter and she wears more corseted dresses. The bold hues used for Lady Susan contrast with the more subtle blues, gold and bronze colours of Alicia Johnson's clothing. Ní Mhaoldomhnaigh used the colours to show Alicia is not fully comfortable with country living, as she comes from the city. The designer also wanted Alicia to appear "quite ornamental" and as if she spent a long time choosing what to wear. Ní Mhaoldomhnaigh said, "The brilliant thing about this film – because all the characters are heightened versions of themselves, it gives you leeway to be bold and use color and texture ... so the costumes can be heightened as well."

=== Music ===
Stillman's regular collaborator Mark Suozzo composed Love & Friendship. French composer Benjamin Esdraffo wrote additional pieces, including the opening harp theme. The score was recorded in August 2015 at the Windmill Lane Studios in Dublin, with Suozzo conducting the Irish Film Orchestra. Suozzo added that 'the music of Love & Friendship brings the Georgian era to life through a variety of musical styles'. The soundtrack includes original compositions and well-known and obscure classical pieces by William Boyce, George Frideric Handel, Henry Purcell, Wolfgang Amadeus Mozart and Antonio Vivaldi. It was released on 6 May 2016.

== Release ==
UK sales agency Protagonist Pictures represented the film at the European Film Market during the Berlin International Film Festival. Amazon Studios acquired the North American rights to the film, and teamed up with Roadside Attractions for its theatrical release. While Curzon Artificial Eye handled the film's UK release. Love & Friendship had its world premiere at the Sundance Film Festival on 23 January 2016. The film received a limited release in the US on 13 May 2016, playing in four theatres, before going wide on 26 May 2016 to 826 cinemas.

A short six-minute documentary of the making of the film titled Behind the Scenes was released in May 2016, which included interviews with the director, and the film's leading and supporting actors, including Stephen Fry.

=== Home media ===
The DVD and Blu-ray release of the film was released on 6 September 2016. It became available on Amazon Prime Video on 20 October 2016.

=== Novelisation ===
A novelisation of the film written by the director Whit Stillman was announced for publication to coincide with the general release of the film on 13 May 2016. Describing the novelization, Alexandra Alter of The New York Times said in her 2016 interview article with Stillman: "In the novel, Mr. Stillman takes the characters and plot from Austen's fictionalised letters and narrates the tale from the perspective of Lady Susan's nephew, who hopes to counter criticism of his maligned aunt. The 41 letters from Austen's Lady Susan are included in an appendix." Stillman told Alter that he felt Lady Susan was not quite finished and thought the form of the book was "so flawed". After realizing that there was another story to be told, he persuaded the publisher Little, Brown and Company to let him write the novel.

== Reception ==
=== Box office ===
Love & Friendship earned $133,513 from four cinemas during its opening weekend in May 2016. The film has grossed over $19 million worldwide, against an estimated production budget of $3 million.

=== Critical response ===
The film received acclaim from critics. On review aggregator Rotten Tomatoes, it has an approval rating of 97%, based on 188 reviews with an average rating of 8.2 out of 10. The website's critical consensus states: "Love & Friendship finds director Whit Stillman bringing his talents to bear on a Jane Austen adaptation – with a thoroughly delightful period drama as the result." Metacritic gave the film an average score of 87 out of 100, based on 36 reviews.

A.O. Scott, in his review for The New York Times, gave high praise to Stillman as director of the film:

Mr. Stillman, who started out (with Metropolitan in 1990) as an anatomist of the manners and mores of the young American "urban haute bourgeoisie" and returned to filmmaking with the campus comedy Damsels in Distress (2012), is perfectly at home in Austen's world. He approaches his literary source not with the usual reverence but with an appreciation for its freewheeling sense of fun. At times, most often when Mr. Bennett is onscreen, Love & Friendship is howlingly funny, and as a whole it feels less like a romance than like a caper, an unabashedly contrived and effortlessly inventive heist movie with a pretty good payoff.

Peter Bradshaw of The Guardian, in a rave review, described it as "a hilariously self-aware period comedy polished to a brilliant sheen", with particular praise reserved for Beckinsale and Tom Bennett, whose Sir James character "comes very close to pinching the whole film, with his gormless, grinning comedy".

Kim Newman at Empire awarded it five out of five.

Writing for The New Yorker, Richard Brody found the film to be "deeply satisfying". In his summary of the film, Brody stated that: "Love & Friendship is both a worldview in motion and the story of how it crystallized; its portrait of a society changing suddenly, drastically, and gloriously through the delicate strategies and bold tactics of a woman who's honest with herself about what she wants and what she'll do to get it is strangely, deeply personal."

A contributor to the British news weekly The Economist praised Beckinsale's acting, stating: "Lady Susan, who Ms Beckinsale brings to life with magnetism and charisma, masterfully uses her charm and wit to thrive in any situation. Even when an intercepted letter exposes her love triangle, she feigns outrage and offence at the breach of her privacy—DeCourcy ends up apologising to her. She is a beguiling woman in full control of her own allure, and uses her 'uncanny' understanding of the men's natures with much success." The contributor added, "Despite some flaws, Love & Friendship is a welcome addition to what we have come to know as the Austen adaptation canon. The film is rollicking, visually stunning and light. Lady Susan is an easy-to-love anti-heroine, a far cry from the rather dull Elizabeth Bennet or the irritating Dashwood sisters."

Writing for TheWrap on 24 January 2016, Alonso Duralde commented on the Sundance premiere of the film, stating: "In the same way that Stillman has brought the courtliness of another era to his modern stories, in Love & Friendship he puts a contemporary twist on venerable material, down to a third-act twist that suggests behaviour that's anything but chaste. Were she around today, Miss Austen would, I think, smile upon this adaptation. And then she might add the upcoming Blu-ray of Stillman's Barcelona to her Amazon wish list."

Justin Chang of Variety described Beckinsale's role as "one of the most satisfying screen roles of her career ... Beckinsale magnetizes the screen in a way that naturally underscores how far ahead of everyone else she is: an effect that doesn't always work to the movie's advantage". Todd McCarthy of The Hollywood Reporter remarked: "There aren't great depths to the role, but Beckinsale excels with the long speeches and in defining her character as a very self-aware egoist."

=== Accolades ===
List of awards and nominations
Award	Date of ceremony	Category	Recipients	Result	Ref(s)
Alliance of Women Film Journalists	21 December 2016	Best Adapted Screenplay	Whit Stillman	Nominated	
Austin Film Critics Association	28 December 2016	Best Adapted Screenplay	Whit Stillman	Nominated	
Chicago Film Critics Association	15 December 2016	Best Adapted Screenplay	Whit Stillman	Nominated	
Critics Choice Awards	11 December 2016	Best Actress in a Comedy	Kate Beckinsale	Nominated	
Critics Choice Awards	11 December 2016	Best Costume Design	Eimer Ní Mhaoldomhnaigh	Nominated	
Dublin Film Critics Circle	17 December 2016	Best Actress	Kate Beckinsale	4th Place	
Dublin Film Critics Circle	17 December 2016	Best Screenplay	Whit Stillman	4th Place	
Evening Standard British Film Awards	8 December 2016	Best Actress	Kate Beckinsale	Won	
Evening Standard British Film Awards	8 December 2016	Best Supporting Actor	Tom Bennett	Nominated	
Florida Film Critics Circle	23 December 2016	Best Adapted Screenplay	Whit Stillman	Won	
Florida Film Critics Circle	23 December 2016	Best Art Direction/Production Design	Love & Friendship	Nominated	
Golden Tomato Awards	12 January 2017	Best Wide Release 2016	Love & Friendship	6th Place	
Golden Tomato Awards	12 January 2017	Best Comedy Movie 2016	Love & Friendship	Won	
Gotham Awards	28 November 2016	Best Actress	Kate Beckinsale	Nominated	
Gotham Awards	28 November 2016	Best Screenplay	Whit Stillman	Nominated	
IndieWire Critics Poll	19 December 2016	Best Supporting Actor	Tom Bennett	7th Place	
IndieWire Critics Poll	19 December 2016	Best Screenplay	Love & Friendship	3rd Place	
Irish Film and Television Academy	8 April 2017	Best Costume Design	Eimer Ní Mhaoldomhnaigh	Nominated	
Irish Film and Television Academy	8 April 2017	Best Film	Love & Friendship	Nominated	
Irish Film and Television Academy	8 April 2017	Best Make Up/Hair	Eileen Buggy and Lynn Johnson	Nominated	
Irish Film and Television Academy	8 April 2017	Best Production Design	Anna Rackard	Nominated	
London Film Critics' Circle	22 January 2017	Actress of the Year	Kate Beckinsale	Nominated	
London Film Critics' Circle	22 January 2017	British/Irish Actor of the Year	Tom Bennett (also for David Brent: Life on the Road)	Nominated	
London Film Critics' Circle	22 January 2017	British/Irish Actress of the Year	Kate Beckinsale	Won	
London Film Critics' Circle	22 January 2017	British/Irish Film of the Year	Love & Friendship	Nominated	
London Film Critics' Circle	22 January 2017	Film of the Year	Love & Friendship	Nominated	
London Film Critics' Circle	22 January 2017	Screenwriter of the Year	Whit Stillman	Nominated	
London Film Critics' Circle	22 January 2017	Supporting Actor of the Year	Tom Bennett	Won (Note: Tied with Mahershala Ali for Moonlight)	
Online Film Critics Society	3 January 2017	Best Supporting Actor	Tom Bennett	Nominated	
Online Film Critics Society	3 January 2017	Best Adapted Screenplay	Whit Stillman	Nominated	
Rotterdam International Film Festival	7 February 2016	Big Screen Award	Whit Stillman	Nominated	
San Diego Film Critics Society	12 December 2016	Best Adapted Screenplay	Whit Stillman	Won	
San Diego Film Critics Society	12 December 2016	Best Costume Design	Eimer Ní Mhaoldomhnaigh	Nominated	
San Diego Film Critics Society	12 December 2016	Best Production Design	Anna Rackard	Nominated	
Satellite Awards	19 February 2017	Best Costume Design	Eimer Ní Mhaoldomhnaigh	Nominated	
Seattle International Film Festival	12 June 2016	Best Actress	Kate Beckinsale	Nominated	
St. Louis Film Critics Association	18 December 2016	Best Adapted Screenplay	Whit Stillman	Won	
