= Royalty Hightower =

American actress

- Royalty Hightower in 2017
- Born: Royalty Hightower; March 25, 2005 (age 21); Cincinnati, Ohio, U.S.
- Education: Winton Woods High School
- Occupations: Actress; Model; Dancer
- Years active: 2014–present
- Agent: Paradigm Entertainment
- Notable work: The Fits
- Mother: Charyce Harris
- Relatives: Yrmajesti Hightower (sister)

Royalty Hightower (born March 25, 2005) is an American actress. Her accolades include nominations for a Gotham Independent Film Award, a CFCA Award, and Golden Space Needle Award. Hightower began her career at the age of nine as a competitive dancer, joining the West End Cincinnati Q-Kidz Dance Team. But transition into acting and made made her film debut at the age of eleven, portraying Toni in the film The Fits (2015). As a child actress, she went on to appear in films such as Great Performers: L.A. Noir (2016), And Then I Go (2017), and Ruby in Murdertown.

== Life and career ==
Royalty Hightower was born on March 25, 2005, in Cincinnati, Ohio. Her mother is Charyce Harris. Hightower has one sister—Yrmajesti—and a brother named King. She joined the Q-Kidz Dance, When she was six years old, after accompanying her older sister to a parade that the Q-Kidz were marching in. The team was a few girls short, so the coach asked her to help out by holding the team's "Q-KIDZ" banner at the front.

Hightower attended Winton Woods Intermediate School and later went to Winton Woods High School. During her time there, she was honored with the Skyline Student Athlete of the Month Award by the Board of Education, and at the third annual "A Night of Freedom" event. In 2024, Hightower enrolled as a sophomore majoring in Sustainable Agriculture at Central State University, where she participated in the Undergraduate Internship and Research Review presentations.

Hightower was discovered by film director Anna Rose Holmer through YouTube videos of the Q-Kidz dance team. In 2014, at age 9, she won her first lead role in the psychological drama The Fits, alongside 45 other members of Q-Kidz, after Holmer contacted the group’s coach, Marquicia Jones-Woods. She was cast for the role of Toni opposite Alexis Neblett and Lauren Gibson. In 2016, she appeared in the virtual reality (VR) short film series Great Performers: L.A. Noir, produced by The New York Times Magazine. Hightower received nominations and awards in the Breakthrough Performance - Female category at the NBR Award, Gotham Independent Film Award, CFCA Award, and Black Reel Awards in 2016.

In 2017, she appeared as Tawanda in the independent drama film And Then I Go, directed by Vincent Grashaw based on Jim Shepard's book Project X. The film had its limited theatrical release in the United States on April 17, 2018. That same year she signed with the talent agency Paradigm. She then co-starred in Leah Rachel's crime thriller Ruby in Murdertown, alongside Laurence Fishburne.

== Filmography ==
Key
†	Denotes productions that have not yet been released

=== Film ===
Year	Film	Role	Notes
2015	The Fits	Toni	Lead role
2016	Great Performers: L.A. Noir	Herself	New York Times video feature
2017	And Then I Go	Tawanda	
TBA	Ruby in Murdertown †	TBA	Pre-Production

== Accolades ==
Year	Award	Category	Result	Ref.
2016	National Board of Review Award	Breakthrough Performance – Female	Won	
2016	Gotham Independent Film Award	Breakthrough Performer – Actor	Nominated	
2016	Chicago Film Critics Awards	Most Promising Performer	Nominated	
2016	RiverRun International Film Festival	Jury Prize for Best Actress	Won	
2016	Women Film Critics Circle	Best Young Actress	Nominated	
2016	Golden Space Needle Award	Best Actress	Nominated	
2017	Black Reel Awards	Outstanding Actress	Nominated	
2017	Black Reel Awards	Outstanding Breakthrough Performance, Female	Nominated	
