= Online Film Critics Society Awards 2016 =

20th Online Film Critics Society Awards

20th Online Film Critics Society Awards
- Date: January 3, 2017

Highlights
- Most nominations: 7 (La La Land, Moonlight)

The 20th Online Film Critics Society, honoring the best in film for 2016, were announced on January 3, 2017. The nominations were announced on December 27, 2016.

== Nominees ==
| Best Picture | Best Director |
|---|---|
| Moonlight; Arrival; The Handmaiden; Hell or High Water; Jackie; La La Land; Manchester by the Sea; O.J.: Made in America; Paterson; The Witch | Barry Jenkins – Moonlight; Damien Chazelle – La La Land; Pablo Larraín – Jackie; Kenneth Lonergan – Manchester by the Sea; Denis Villeneuve – Arrival |
| Best Actor | Best Actress |
| Casey Affleck – Manchester by the Sea; Adam Driver – Paterson; Ryan Gosling – La La Land; Viggo Mortensen – Captain Fantastic; Denzel Washington – Fences | Natalie Portman – Jackie; Amy Adams – Arrival; Isabelle Huppert – Elle; Ruth Negga – Loving; Emma Stone – La La Land |
| Best Supporting Actor | Best Supporting Actress |
| Mahershala Ali – Moonlight; Tom Bennett – Love & Friendship; Jeff Bridges – Hell or High Water; Lucas Hedges – Manchester by the Sea; Michael Shannon – Nocturnal Animals | Naomie Harris – Moonlight; Viola Davis – Fences; Lily Gladstone – Certain Women; Octavia Spencer – Hidden Figures; Michelle Williams – Manchester by the Sea |
| Best Animated Feature | Best Film Not in the English Language |
| Kubo and the Two Strings; Finding Dory; Moana; The Red Turtle; Zootopia | The Handmaiden; Elle; Neruda; The Salesman; Toni Erdmann |
| Best Documentary | Best Non-U.S. Release (non-competitive category) |
| O.J.: Made in America; 13th; Cameraperson; I Am Not Your Negro; Weiner | After the Storm; The Death of Louis XIV; The Girl with All the Gifts; Graduation; Nocturna; Personal Shopper; A Quiet Passion; Staying Vertical; The Unknown Girl; Yourself and Yours |
| Best Adapted Screenplay | Best Original Screenplay |
| Eric Heisserer – Arrival; David Birke – Elle; Whit Stillman – Love & Friendship; Barry Jenkins and Tarell Alvin McCraney – Moonlight; Tom Ford – Nocturnal Animals | Taylor Sheridan – Hell or High Water; Noah Oppenheim – Jackie; Damien Chazelle – La La Land; Yorgos Lanthimos and Efthimis Filippou – The Lobster; Kenneth Lonergan – Manchester by the Sea |
| Best Editing | Best Cinematography |
| Tom Cross – La La Land; Joe Walker – Arrival; Nels Bangerter – Cameraperson; Sebastián Sepúlveda – Jackie; Nat Sanders and Joi McMillon – Moonlight | Linus Sandgren – La La Land; Bradford Young – Arrival; Stéphane Fontaine – Jackie; James Laxton – Moonlight; Natasha Braier – The Neon Demon |
