= San Diego Film Critics Society Awards 2016 =

Annual US film awards ceremony

The 21st San Diego Film Critics Society Awards were announced on December 12, 2016.

== Winners and nominees ==
=== Best Film ===
Hell or High Water

- La La Land
- Manchester by the Sea
- Moonlight
- Nocturnal Animals

=== Best Director ===
David Mackenzie – Hell or High Water

- Damien Chazelle – La La Land
- Tom Ford – Nocturnal Animals
- Barry Jenkins – Moonlight
- Kenneth Lonergan – Manchester by the Sea

=== Best Male Actor ===
Casey Affleck – Manchester by the Sea

- Adam Driver – Paterson
- Joel Edgerton – Loving
- Ryan Gosling – La La Land
- Jake Gyllenhaal – Nocturnal Animals
- Chris Pine – Hell or High Water
- Viggo Mortensen – Captain Fantastic

=== Best Female Actor ===
Sônia Braga – Aquarius

- Annette Bening – 20th Century Women
- Ruth Negga – Loving
- Natalie Portman – Jackie
- Emma Stone – La La Land

=== Best Male Supporting Actor ===
Mahershala Ali – Moonlight (TIE)
Ben Foster – Hell or High Water (TIE)

- Jeff Bridges – Hell or High Water
- Michael Shannon – Nocturnal Animals
- Aaron Taylor-Johnson – Nocturnal Animals

=== Best Female Supporting Actor ===
Michelle Williams – Manchester by the Sea

- Judy Davis – The Dressmaker
- Greta Gerwig – 20th Century Women
- Lily Gladstone – Certain Women
- Nicole Kidman – Lion

=== Best Comedic Performance ===
Ryan Gosling – The Nice Guys

- Julian Dennison – Hunt for the Wilderpeople
- Alden Ehrenreich – Hail, Caesar!
- Kate McKinnon – Ghostbusters
- Ryan Reynolds – Deadpool

=== Best Original Screenplay ===
Taylor Sheridan – Hell or High Water

- Damien Chazelle – La La Land
- Efthimis Filippou and Yorgos Lanthimos – The Lobster
- Barry Jenkins and Tarell Alvin McCraney – Moonlight
- Kenneth Lonergan – Manchester by the Sea

=== Best Adapted Screenplay ===
Whit Stillman – Love & Friendship

- Luke Davies – Lion
- Tom Ford – Nocturnal Animals
- Eric Heisserer – Arrival
- Taika Waititi – Hunt for the Wilderpeople

=== Best Animated Film ===
Kubo and the Two Strings

- April and the Extraordinary World
- Long Way North
- Moana
- Zootopia

=== Best Documentary ===
Weiner

- De Palma
- Gleason
- O.J.: Made in America
- Tower

=== Best Foreign Language Film ===
Mountains May Depart

- Aquarius
- The Handmaiden
- A Man Called Ove
- Mother
- Neruda

=== Best Cinematography ===
Giles Nuttgens – Hell or High Water

- James Laxton – Moonlight
- Seamus McGarvey – Nocturnal Animals
- Linus Sandgren – La La Land
- Bradford Young – Arrival

=== Best Costume Design ===
Mary Zophres – La La Land

- Suzy Benzinger – Café Society
- Marion Boyce and Margot Wilson – The Dressmaker
- Madeline Fontaine – Jackie
- Eimer Ní Mhaoldomhnaigh – Love & Friendship

=== Best Editing ===
Blu Murray – Sully

- Tom Cross – La La Land
- Jake Roberts – Hell or High Water
- Joan Sobel – Nocturnal Animals
- Joe Walker – Arrival

=== Best Production Design ===
Jess Gonchor – Hail, Caesar!

- Jean Rabasse – Jackie
- Anna Rackard – Love & Friendship
- Shane Valentino – Nocturnal Animals
- Patrice Vermette – Arrival
- David Wasco – La La Land

=== Best Visual Effects ===
The Jungle Book

- Arrival
- Doctor Strange
- La La Land
- A Monster Calls

=== Best Use of Music in a Film ===
Sing Street

- Everybody Wants Some!!
- Hell or High Water
- Jackie
- La La Land

=== Breakthrough Artist ===
Lily Gladstone – Certain Women

- Julian Dennison – Hunt for the Wilderpeople
- Alden Ehrenreich – Hail, Caesar! and Rules Don't Apply
- Lucas Hedges – Manchester by the Sea
- Anya Taylor-Joy – The Witch

=== Best Ensemble ===
Hell or High Water

- 20th Century Women
- Hidden Figures
- Moonlight
- Nocturnal Animals

=== Best Body of Work ===
Michael Shannon for Elvis & Nixon, Loving, Midnight Special, and Nocturnal Animals
