= Florida Film Critics Circle Awards 2016 =

Annual US film awards ceremony

21st FFCC Awards

December 23, 2016

Best Picture:
The Lobster

The 21st Florida Film Critics Circle Awards were held on December 23, 2016.

The nominations were announced on December 20, 2016, led by Moonlight with ten nominations.

== Winners and nominees ==
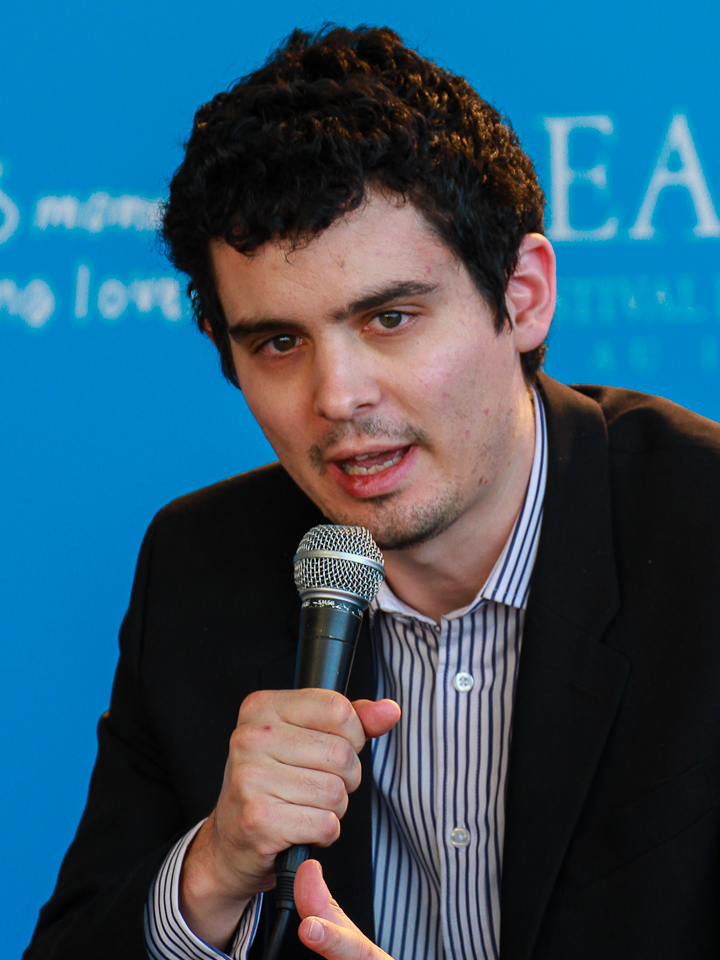
Damien Chazelle, Best Director winner

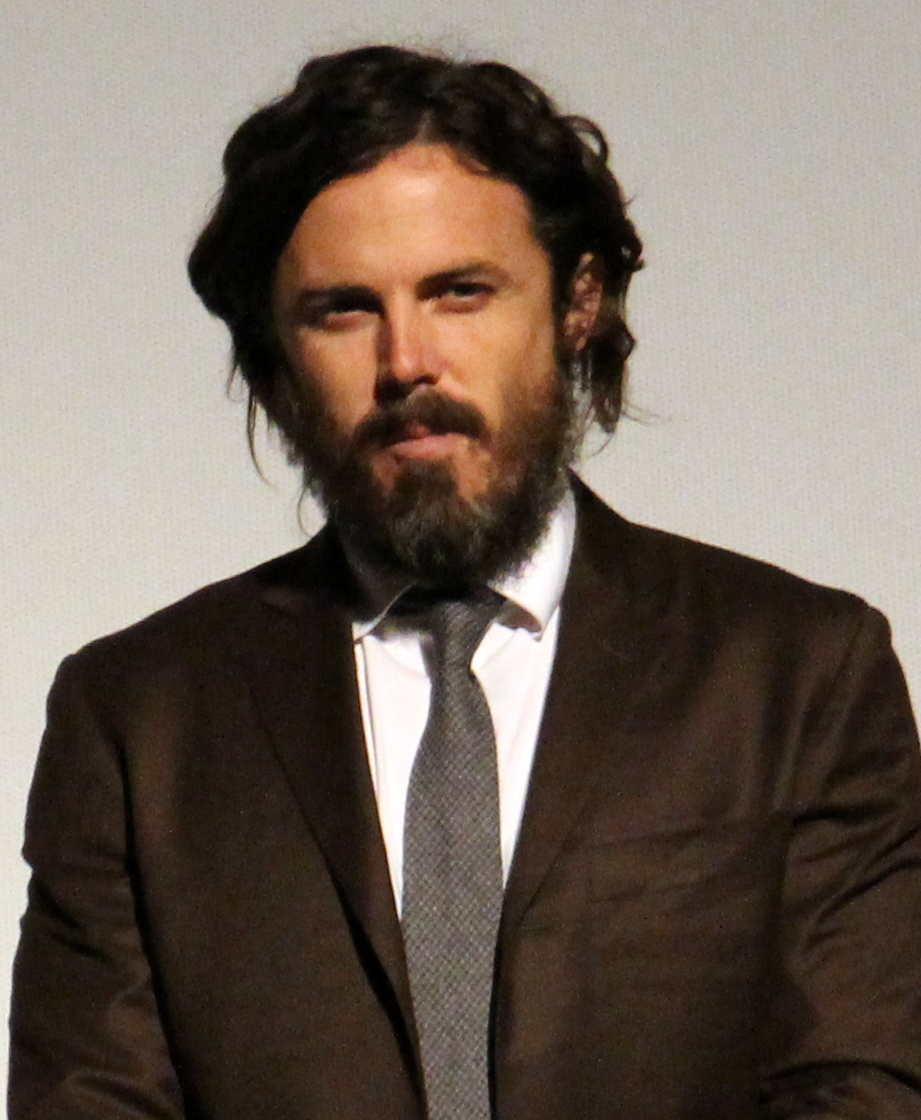
Casey Affleck, Best Actor winner

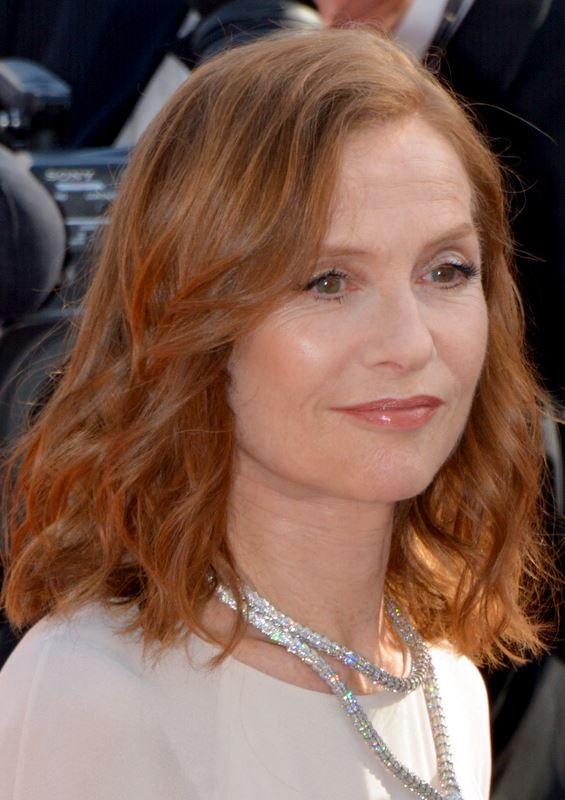
Isabelle Huppert, Best Actress winner

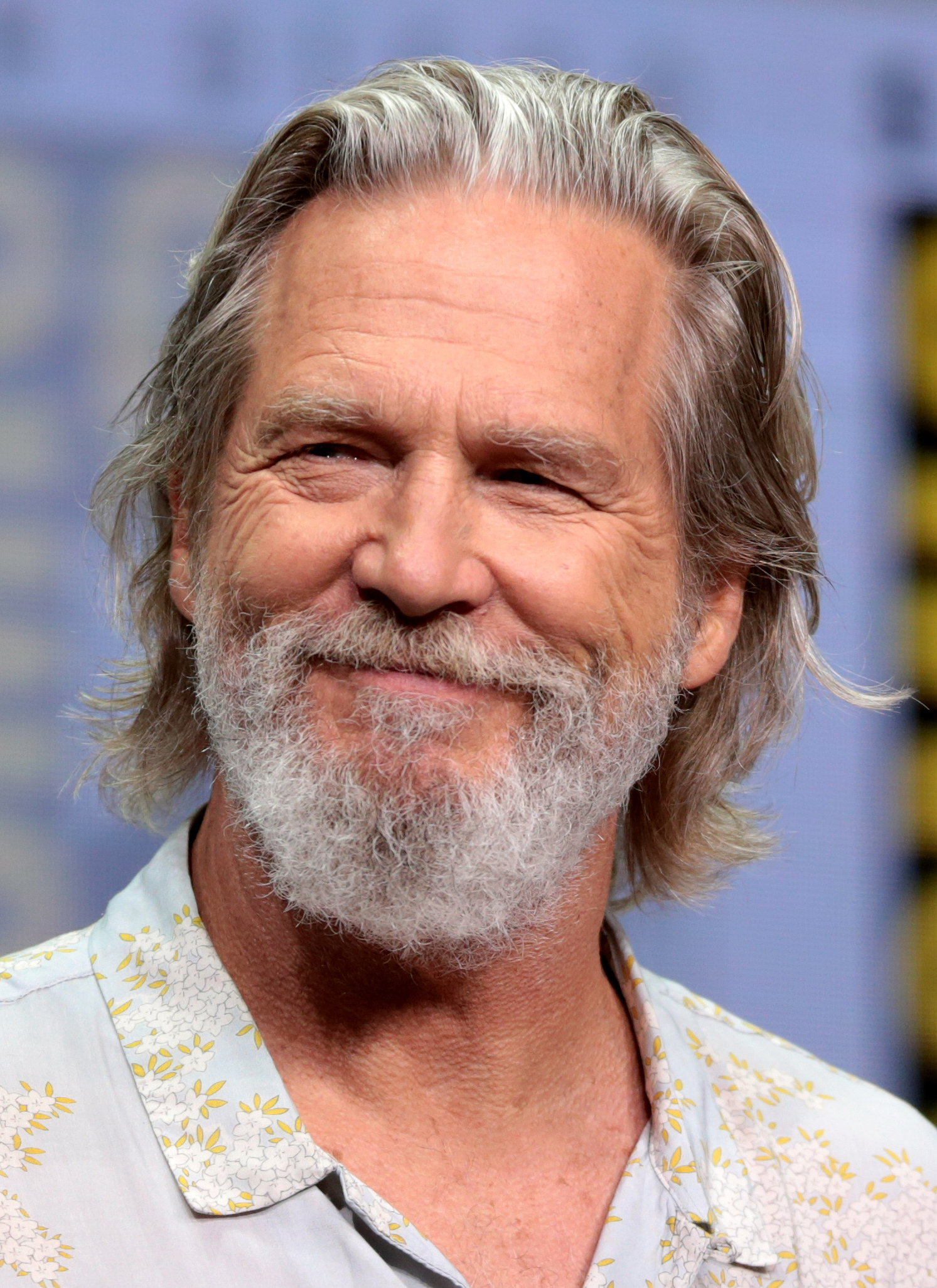
Jeff Bridges, Best Supporting Actor winner

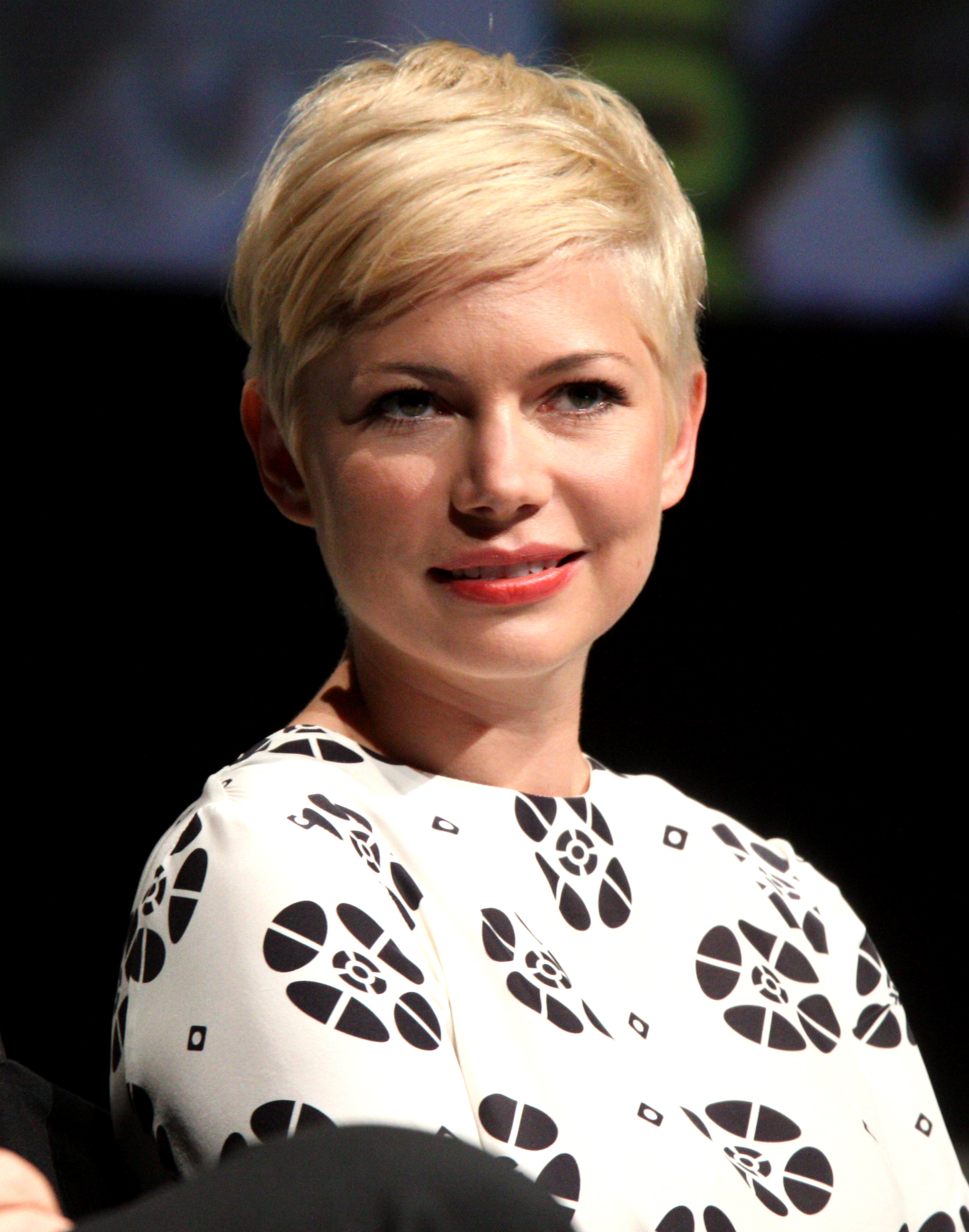
Michelle Williams, Best Supporting Actress winner

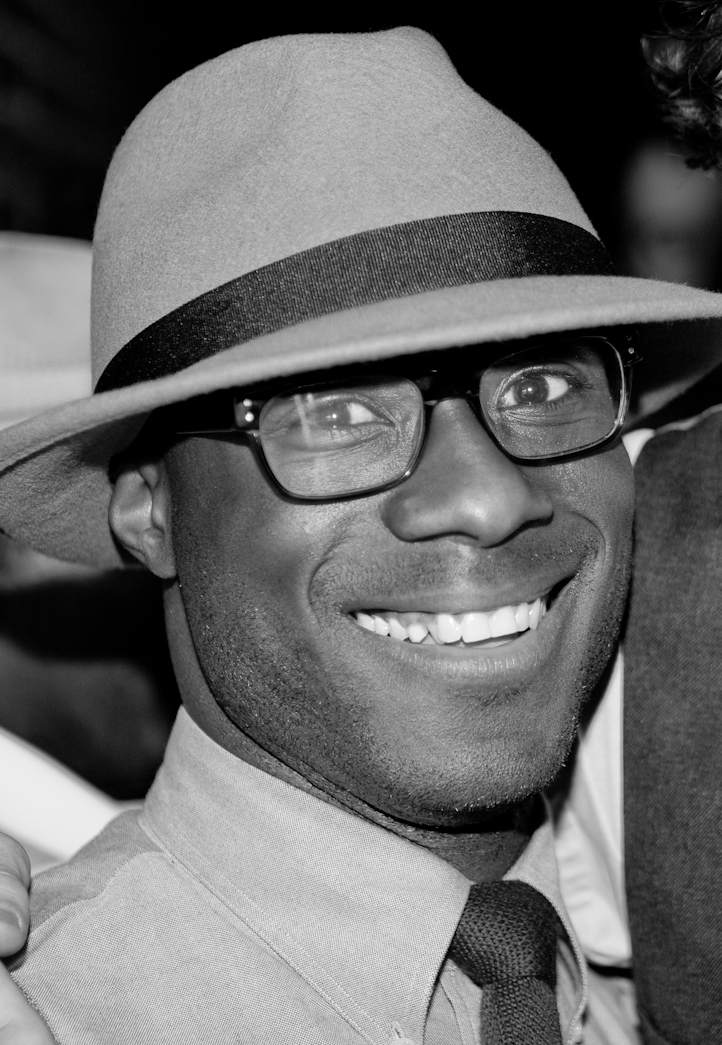
Barry Jenkins, Pauline Kael Breakout Award winner

Winners are listed at the top of each list in bold, while the runner-ups for each category are listed under them.

Best Film	Best Director
**The Lobster**: Runner-up: La La Land; Hell or High Water; Manchester by the Sea; Moonlight	**Damien Chazelle – La La Land**: Runner-up: Yorgos Lanthimos – The Lobster; Barry Jenkins – Moonlight; Kenneth Lonergan – Manchester by the Sea
Best Actor	Best Actress
**Casey Affleck – Manchester by the Sea as Lee Chandler**: Runner-up: Joel Edgerton – Loving as Richard Loving; Ryan Gosling – La La Land as Sebastian Wilder; Viggo Mortensen – Captain Fantastic as Ben Cash; Denzel Washington – Fences as Troy Maxson	**Isabelle Huppert – Elle as Michèle Leblanc**: Runner-up: Emma Stone – La La Land as Mia Dolan; Annette Bening – 20th Century Women as Dorothea Fields; Ruth Negga – Loving as Mildred Loving; Natalie Portman – Jackie as Jackie Kennedy
Best Supporting Actor	Best Supporting Actress
**Jeff Bridges – Hell or High Water as Marcus Hamilton**: Runner-up: Ralph Fiennes – A Bigger Splash as Harry Hawkes; Mahershala Ali – Moonlight as Juan; André Holland – Moonlight as Kevin; Michael Shannon – Nocturnal Animals as Bobby Andes	**Michelle Williams – Manchester by the Sea as Randi**: Runner-up: Viola Davis – Fences as Rose Lee Maxson; Greta Gerwig – 20th Century Women as Abbie Porter; Lily Gladstone – Certain Women as Jamie / The Rancher; Naomie Harris – Moonlight as Paula; Octavia Spencer – Hidden Figures as Dorothy Vaughan
Best Adapted Screenplay	Best Original Screenplay
**Love & Friendship**: Runner-up: Moonlight; Arrival; Fences; Nocturnal Animals	**The Lobster**: Runner-up: Manchester by the Sea; 20th Century Women; Hell or High Water; La La Land
Best Animated Film	Best Documentary
**Kubo and the Two Strings**: Runner-up: Zootopia; Moana; Sausage Party	**Cameraperson**: Runner-up: O.J.: Made in America; I Am Not Your Negro; Life, Animated; Weiner
Best Foreign Language Film	Best Ensemble
**Elle**: Runner-up: The Handmaiden; Embrace of the Serpent; The Salesman; Toni Erdmann	**American Honey**: Runner-up: Moonlight; 20th Century Women; Hidden Figures; Manchester by the Sea
Best Art Direction / Production Design	Best Cinematography
**La La Land**: Runner-up: Jackie; Arrival; Fantastic Beasts and Where to Find Them; Love & Friendship	**La La Land**: Runner-up: The Handmaiden; Arrival; Jackie; Moonlight
Best Score	Best Visual Effects
**La La Land**: Runner-up: Jackie; Arrival; Moonlight	**Arrival**: Runner-up: Doctor Strange; Fantastic Beasts and Where to Find Them; The Jungle Book; Rogue One: A Star Wars Story
Best First Film	Pauline Kael Breakout Award
**The Edge of Seventeen**: Runner-up: The Witch; The Childhood of a Leader; Spa Night; Swiss Army Man	**Barry Jenkins – Moonlight**: Runner-up: Lucas Hedges – Manchester by the Sea as Patrick Chandler
Golden Orange Award
**The cast and crew of Moonlight**
