= Anna Rose Holmer =

American director and writer

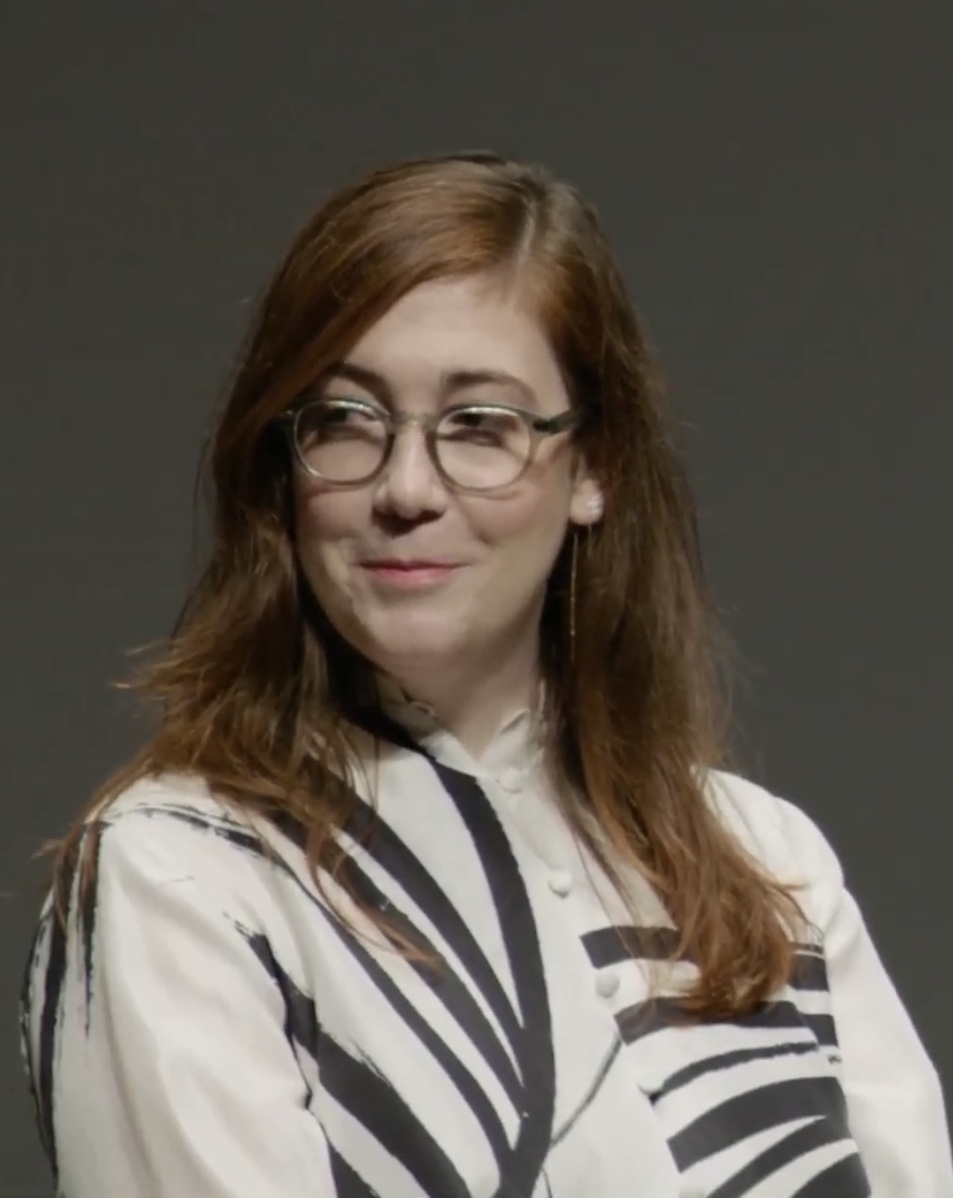
- Holmer at the 2022 Directors' Fortnight
- Born: Anna Rose Farrell; Pawling, New York, U.S.
- Education: New York University Tisch School of the Arts
- Occupation: Filmmaker
- Years active: 2015–present

Anna Rose Holmer (née Farrell) is an American director and writer. She began her career in the camera department before directing her feature debut The Fits (2015). She collaborated with Saela Davis on the Irish film God's Creatures (2022).

== Early life ==
Holmer was born in Pawling, New York. She was raised by her mother, an art teacher, and her father, a piano tuner. She attended Oakwood Friends School in Poughkeepsie. She was introduced to film as a teenager through a photography workshop in Maine. She went on to study Film with a concentration in Cinematography at NYU Tisch School of the Arts, graduating in 2007.

== Career ==
In 2014 Holmer pitched the idea of her film The Fits to Biennale College Cinema. She was awarded a grant and proceeded to make her film on a microbudget. The film premiered at the 72nd Venice International Film Festival in 2015 and then went on to play at the 2016 Sundance Film Festival where it was acquired for distribution by Oscilloscope Laboratories.

In 2018 Holmer directed the music video for James Blake's "My Willing Heart" featuring Natalie Portman, and in 2022 she co-directed (with Saela Davis) the Irish film God's Creatures, starring Paul Mescal, Emily Watson, and Aisling Franciosi.
