= The Fits (film) =

2015 film directed by Anna Rose Holmer

- Theatrical release poster
- Directed by: Anna Rose Holmer
- Screenplay by: Anna Rose Holmer
- Story by: Anna Rose Holmer; Saela Davis; Lisa Kjerulff
- Produced by: Anna Rose Holmer; Lisa Kjerulff
- Starring: Royalty Hightower; Alexis Neblett; Da'Sean Minor; Lauren Gibson; Makyla Burnam; Inayah Rodgers; Antonio A. B. Grant Jr.
- Cinematography: Paul Yee
- Edited by: Saela Davis
- Music by: Danny Bensi; Saunder Jurriaans
- Production companies: La Biennale di Venezia; Yes, Ma'am!
- Distributed by: Oscilloscope Laboratories
- Release date: September 4, 2015 (Venice Film Festival)
- Running time: 72 minutes
- Countries: United States; Italy
- Budget: €150,000 (approximately $168,333)
- Box office: $167,137

The Fits is a 2015 American drama film directed by Anna Rose Holmer in her feature debut. The film tells the story of Toni (Royalty Hightower), an 11-year-old tomboy who struggles to fit into a girls’ dance troupe as its members begin to suffer from an inexplicable epidemic of violent fits.

The film premiered at the 2015 Venice Film Festival and was selected to take part in the 2016 Sundance Film Festival. Oscilloscope Laboratories obtained U.S. distribution rights to the film before its Sundance debut.

== Plot ==
Eleven-year-old Toni trains with her brother Jermaine in the boxing gym at the Lincoln Community Center in Cincinnati. She starts to take notice of the girls' dance team, which also practices there. Toni watches through the doors to the practice room as two girls dance at each other. The next day, Toni goes into the empty gym and starts to dance, mimicking the actions of the girls whom she had seen dancing earlier. Jermaine interrupts her to ask if she is ready to go hit the stairs where they go to continue training. He tells Toni that he saw her dancing and encourages her to try out for the team.

Toni goes to the tryouts and observes the team with a group of other young hopefuls. The team captains, Legs and Karisma, teach the girls the "clap back call," which they try to do with little success. Toni continues to practice the routine in the empty gym. Legs comes in to pick up some water bottles and asks Toni to go fill them before practice. She befriends two other girls, Beezy and Maia. During practice, Legs collapses and appears to have a seizure before she is hospitalized. Karisma takes over the practices before she too suffers from a fainting fit. Later, Toni tells Jermaine about the seizures. Jermaine warns Toni not to start acting like Karisma, as she is the craziest one of them all.

Later, Toni aggressively practices the dance routine, smiling as she begins to master it. At practice the next day, she looks disappointed to hear that it is cancelled. She and Beezy play in the empty building and try on their new uniforms. They talk about the seizure episodes and question whether they were caused by some sort of boyfriend disease.

The next day, the supervisor announces that they suspect there might be something in the water, so they should only drink from the water cooler in the boxing gym. Girls continue to have seizure episodes. Toni watches a newscaster reporting on "the fits", stating that city officials are working with the county health department to investigate the cause. Later, Toni, Beezy, and Maia listen in as a group of girls is talking about what each of their episodes felt like. Beezy and Maia note that only the older girls have been getting sick. Maia tells Toni that she wants to know how the fits feel since they seem inevitable. Later, at practice, Maia has an episode. Toni argues with Beezy, saying that Maia wanted it to happen to her.

An official tells the girls and their parents that she has found nothing wrong with the water. Beezy is called in to meet with the doctor and Toni watches through the window as she begins to seize. Later, Beezy and Maia talk about their experience with the fits as Toni listens.

Toni skips practice and goes to stand in the empty pool. As she walks back towards the gym, she begins to float in the air. The team watches in shock as she enters the room, floating and flailing her arms with her eyes closed. The film then cuts to shots of Toni and the dance team in uniform performing on the stairs, in the gym, the boxing ring, and in the empty pool. It then cuts back to Toni still flailing in the air, before she falls to the ground. She opens her eyes and smiles.

== Cast ==
- Royalty Hightower as Toni
- Alexis Neblett as Beezy
- Lauren Gibson as Maia
- Da'Sean Minor as Jermaine
- Inayah Rodgers as Karisma
- Makyla Burnam as Legs
- Antonio A.B. Grant Jr. as Donté
- Q-Kidz Dance Team as "The Lionesses"

== Production ==
=== Development ===
The Fits was funded through grants from the Venice Biennale College-Cinema initiative, which supports "teams of directors and producers to make their first or second micro-budget audio-visual work". For a year before submitting an application, Director Anna Rose Holmer, alongside her co-writer and producer, Lisa Kjerulff, and editor and co-writer, Saela Davis, developed a Tumblr with ideas for the film. They submitted the Tumblr alongside an outline and pitch statement when the call for open submissions came. Their pitch was awarded a €150,000 grant which funded the 11-month production period until the film premiered at the 2015 Venice Film Festival.

While developing the script, Holmer was inspired by real-life stories of communities succumbing to fits of hysteria. She first became interested in historic cases of mass psychogenic illness and conversion disorder while producing Ballet 422 (2014). Examples of outbreaks of seizure-like attacks and uncontrollable spasms date back to the Middle Ages, but there are still cases of this occurring today. In 2007, a group of high school girls in Virginia suffered from "twitching arms and legs" that eventually resolved itself. Holmer's research into this subject, specifically cases like the dancing plague of 1518 and the pattern of these fits emerging among young women, inspired her to explore the nature of this subject in a coming-of-age dance film.

=== Pre-production ===
After developing the first draft of the script, they began looking at dance teams. Holmer discovered the Cincinnati-based Q Kidz Dance Team on YouTube while she was still working on her pitch for the Venice Biennale College's program. Upon finding the Q Kidz, the writers adapted the story with them and their dance form in mind. After receiving, Holmer relocated to Cincinnati and began working with Q Kidz's coach, Marquicia Jones-Wood, and hired her as a producer on the project. Forty-five out of several hundred Q Kidz dancers were cast for the film. The boxers were also all real Junior Olympic-level boxers. Holmer tried to involve the kids in the film as much as possible, collaborating with them on writing their own dialogue. Additionally, they workshopped for 6 weeks before production began.

After casting the Q Kidz, they opened up casting for the lead amongst them. Royalty Hightower, who was nine years old at the beginning of the process and had already been dancing with the Q Kidz for 3 years, was cast as Toni. Holmer commented that Hightower had "this amazing power of listening and observing...she was really in tune with her body, in a way that is necessary to play Toni." Hightower worked in depth with movement consultant Celia Rowlson-Hall to appear bad at dancing in the beginning of the film. Rowlson-Hall also choreographed all of the fits with each girl individually. They were developed in isolation so that the rest of the cast only saw the performance on the day when it was filmed to create a unique and impactful moment for each girl. Two of the Q Kidz dance captains, Mariah and Chariah Jones, helped to choreograph the film's dance battles and drill choreography as well as incorporating in boxing moves for Toni's character.

=== Filming ===
Saela Davis and Lisa Kjerulff, the film's co-writers, served other key positions in the film's crew, with Davis as an editor and Kjerulff as a producer. Of the film, Holmer said, “This had the most female department heads and most gender-balanced crew that I’ve ever worked with, and that came directly from the three of us being the key decision-makers and hirers. The dynamic was pushed even further because we had a cast of 45 teenage girls; I think it was important for them to see women — and lots of diverse women — in positions of power on set”.

== Reception ==
=== Critical response ===
The Fits was widely acclaimed by critics. On Rotten Tomatoes, the film has an approval rating of 96%, based on 110 reviews. The site's critical consensus reads, "As gripping as it is unique, the thrillingly kinetic The Fits marks debuting writer-director Anna Rose Holmer as a singular talent." On Metacritic, the film has a score of 90 out of 100, based on 24 reviews, indicating "universal acclaim". David Rooney of The Hollywood Reporter called it a "small-scale but captivating first feature". Similarly a critic for Variety called it as a "promising debut feature" and all praised it for its "meticulous mood of psychological isolation and beguiling mystery."

=== Accolades ===
List of Accolades
Award / Film Festival	Category	Recipient(s)	Result	Ref(s)
Cleveland International Film Festival	New Direction Competition	Anna Rose Holmer	Won	
Deauville Film Festival	Critics Award	Anna Rose Holmer	Won	
Deauville Film Festival	Grand Special Prize	Anna Rose Holmer	Nominated	
Fantastic Cinema Festival	Grand Jury Award for Best Feature Film	Anna Rose Holmer	Nominated	
Gotham Awards	Bingham Ray Breakthrough Director Award	Anna Rose Holmer	Nominated	
Gotham Awards	Breakthrough Actor	Royalty Hightower	Nominated	
Independent Spirit Awards	Best First Feature	Anna Rose Holmer and Lisa Kjerulff	Nominated	
Independent Spirit Awards	Someone to Watch Award	Anna Rose Holmer	Won	
Milwaukee Film Festival	Hertzfeld Competition Award	Anna Rose Holmer	Won	
Montclair Film Festival	Future/Now Prize	Anna Rose Holmer	Won	
Nashville Film Festival	Grand Jury Prize New Directors Competition	Anna Rose Holmer	Nominated	
RiverRun International Film Festival	Jury Prize for Best Narrative Feature	Anna Rose Holmer	Won	
RiverRun International Film Festival	Jury Prize for Best Actress	Royalty Hightower	Won	
San Francisco International Film Festival	Golden Gate Award for New Director	Anna Rose Holmer	Nominated	
Sarasota Film Festival	Jury Prize Narrative Feature Film Competition	Anna Rose Holmer	Nominated	
Seattle International Film Festival	Golden Space Needle Award for Best Actress	Royalty Hightower	Nominated	
The WIFTS Foundation International Visionary Awards	The Best Director Award	Anna Rose Holmer	Won	
Women Film Critics Circle	Best Young Actress	Royalty Hightower	Nominated	
