= List of accolades received by Fences (film) =

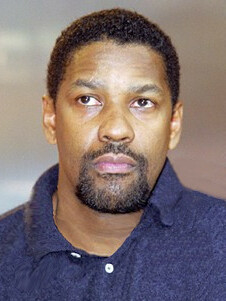
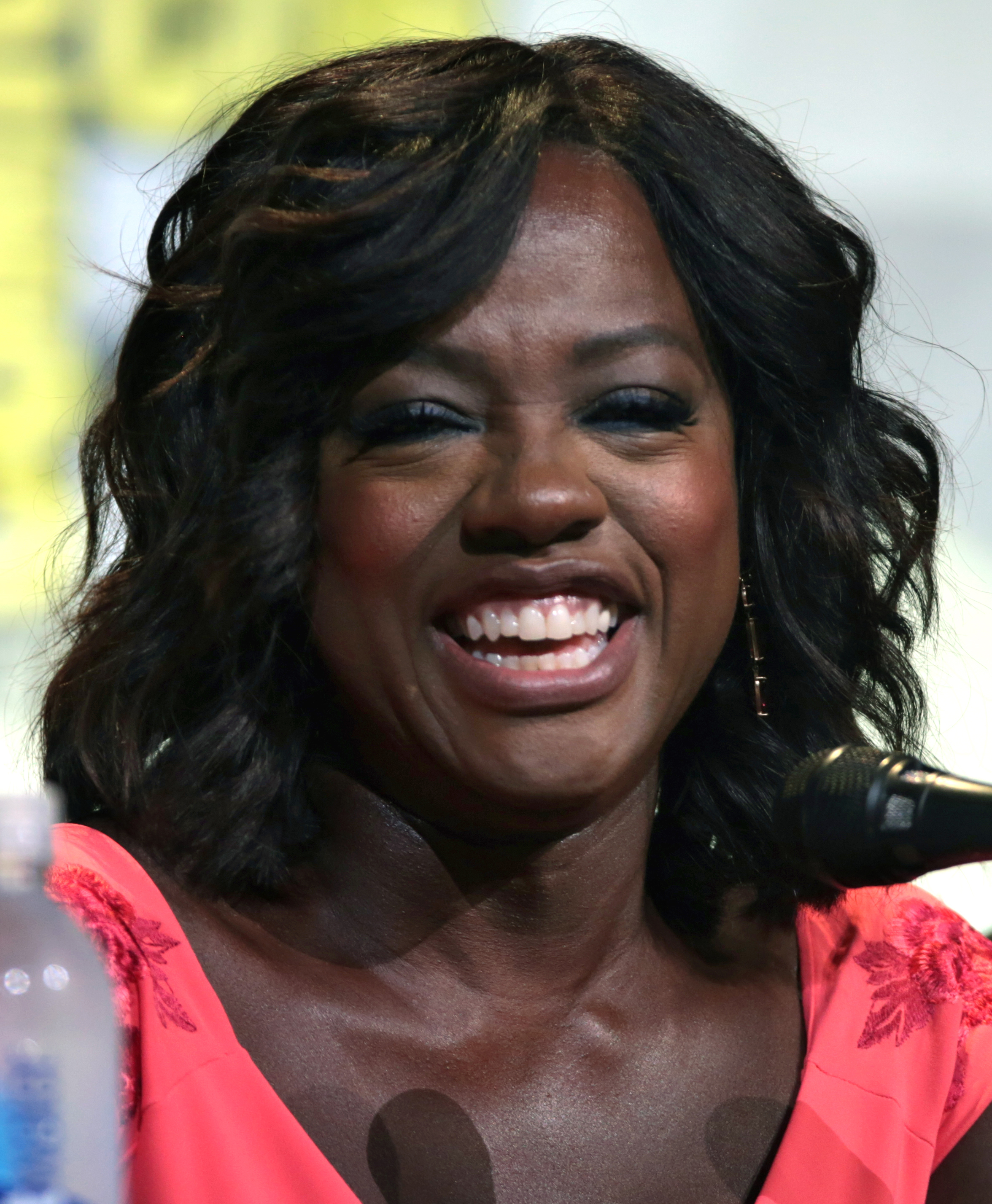
- Denzel Washington and Viola Davis received several awards and nominations for their performance in the film
Accolades
Award	Won	Nominated	Standing
AACTA International Awards	0	2
AARP Annual Movies for Grownups Awards	2	8
Academy Awards	1	4
African-American Film Critics Association	3	4	2nd Place
Alliance of Women Film Journalists	1	3
Art Directors Guild Awards	0	1
Austin Film Critics Association	1	2
Black Reel Awards	2	10
British Academy Film Awards	1	1
Chicago Film Critics Association	0	2
Critics' Choice Awards	1	6
Dallas-Fort Worth Film Critics Association	1	2	2nd Place
Detroit Film Critics Society	1	3
Dorian Awards	1	2
Florida Film Critics Circle	0	3	Runner-up
Golden Globe Awards	1	2
Golden Tomato Awards	0	1	4th Place
Houston Film Critics Society	1	2
IndieWire Critics Poll	0	2	4th Place, 5th Place
London Film Critics Circle	0	1
NAACP Image Awards	2	3
National Society of Film Critics	0	1	2nd Place
New York Film Critics Online	2	2
Online Film Critics Society	0	2
Producers Guild of America	0	1
San Francisco Film Critics Circle	2	3
Santa Barbara International Film Festival	2	2
Satellite Awards	0	4
Screen Actors Guild Awards	2	3
St. Louis Film Critics Association	1	2
Toronto Film Critics Association	0	1	Runner-up
USC Scripter Awards	0	1
Vancouver Film Critics Circle	0	2
Washington D.C. Area Film Critics Association	1	4
Writers Guild of America Awards	0	1
- Total number of awards and nominations
Totals	29	96	
- References

Fences is a 2016 American drama film directed by Denzel Washington and written by August Wilson. Starring Washington, Viola Davis, Jovan Adepo and Stephen McKinley Henderson, the film focuses on a man and his life, family, and job. The film began a limited release on December 16, 2016, before opening wide on December 25. The film was released to universal acclaim, with Rotten Tomatoes listing an approval rating of 93%, based on 207 reviews, with an average rating of 7.7/10, and Metacritic listing a score of 79 out of 100, based on 48 reviews.

Fences won the Academy Award for Best Supporting Actress and the British Academy Film Award for Best Actress in a Supporting Role for Davis. The film won Best Supporting Actress for Davis and was nominated for Best Picture, Best Director, Best Actor for Washington, Best Acting Ensemble and Best Adapted Screenplay at Critics' Choice Awards. The film won Best Supporting Actress – Motion Picture for Davis and was nominated for Best Actor – Motion Picture Drama for Washington at Golden Globe Awards. The film received four nominations at Satellite Awards, including Best Film, Best Director, Best Actor for Washington and Best Supporting Actress for Davis.

== Accolades ==
Award	Date of ceremony	Category	Recipient(s)	Result	Ref.
AACTA International Awards	January 8, 2017	Best Actor	Denzel Washington	Nominated	
AACTA International Awards	January 8, 2017	Best Supporting Actress	Viola Davis	Nominated	
AARP Annual Movies for Grownups Awards	February 6, 2017	Best Actor	Denzel Washington	Won	
AARP Annual Movies for Grownups Awards	February 6, 2017	Best Supporting Actress	Viola Davis	Won	
AARP Annual Movies for Grownups Awards	February 6, 2017	Best Supporting Actor	Stephen McKinley Henderson	Nominated	
AARP Annual Movies for Grownups Awards	February 6, 2017	Best Director	Denzel Washington	Nominated	
AARP Annual Movies for Grownups Awards	February 6, 2017	Best Screenwriter	August Wilson	Nominated	
AARP Annual Movies for Grownups Awards	February 6, 2017	Best Grownup Love Story	Denzel Washington and Viola Davis	Nominated	
AARP Annual Movies for Grownups Awards	February 6, 2017	Best Intergenerational Film	Fences	Nominated	
AARP Annual Movies for Grownups Awards	February 6, 2017	Best Buddy Picture	Stephen McKinley Henderson and Denzel Washington	Nominated	
Academy Awards	February 26, 2017	Best Picture	Todd Black, Scott Rudin and Denzel Washington	Nominated	
Academy Awards	February 26, 2017	Best Actor	Denzel Washington	Nominated	
Academy Awards	February 26, 2017	Best Supporting Actress	Viola Davis	Won	
Academy Awards	February 26, 2017	Best Adapted Screenplay	August Wilson	Nominated	
African-American Film Critics Association	February 8, 2017	Best Actor	Denzel Washington	Won	
African-American Film Critics Association	February 8, 2017	Best Supporting Actress	Viola Davis	Won	
African-American Film Critics Association	February 8, 2017	Best Screenplay	August Wilson	Won	
African-American Film Critics Association	February 8, 2017	Top 10 Films	Fences	2nd Place	
Alliance of Women Film Journalists	December 21, 2016	Best Actor	Denzel Washington	Nominated	
Alliance of Women Film Journalists	December 21, 2016	Best Supporting Actress	Viola Davis	Won	
Alliance of Women Film Journalists	December 21, 2016	Actress Defying Age and Ageism	Viola Davis	Nominated	
Art Directors Guild Awards	February 11, 2017	Excellence in Production Design for a Period Film	David Gropman	Nominated	
Austin Film Critics Association	December 28, 2016	Best Actor	Denzel Washington	Nominated	
Austin Film Critics Association	December 28, 2016	Best Supporting Actress	Viola Davis	Won	
BET Awards	June 25, 2017	Best Movie	Fences	Nominated	
BET Awards	June 25, 2017	Best Actress	Viola Davis	Nominated	
BET Awards	June 25, 2017	Best Actor	Denzel Washington	Nominated	
Black Reel Awards	February 16, 2017	Outstanding Film	Todd Black, Scott Rudin and Denzel Washington	Nominated	
Black Reel Awards	February 16, 2017	Outstanding Director	Denzel Washington	Nominated	
Black Reel Awards	February 16, 2017	Outstanding Actor	Denzel Washington	Won	
Black Reel Awards	February 16, 2017	Outstanding Supporting Actor	Jovan Adepo	Nominated	
Black Reel Awards	February 16, 2017	Outstanding Supporting Actor	Stephen McKinley Henderson	Nominated	
Black Reel Awards	February 16, 2017	Outstanding Supporting Actress	Viola Davis	Won	
Black Reel Awards	February 16, 2017	Outstanding Screenplay, Adapted or Original	August Wilson	Nominated	
Black Reel Awards	February 16, 2017	Outstanding Ensemble	The cast of Fences	Nominated	
Black Reel Awards	February 16, 2017	Outstanding Breakthrough Performance, Male	Jovan Adepo	Nominated	
Black Reel Awards	February 16, 2017	Outstanding Original Score	Marcelo Zarvos	Nominated	
BAFTA Award	February 12, 2017	Best Actress in a Supporting Role	Viola Davis	Won	
Chicago Film Critics Association	December 15, 2016	Best Actor	Denzel Washington	Nominated	
Chicago Film Critics Association	December 15, 2016	Best Supporting Actress	Viola Davis	Nominated	
Critics' Choice Movie Awards	December 11, 2016	Best Picture	Fences	Nominated	
Critics' Choice Movie Awards	December 11, 2016	Best Director	Denzel Washington	Nominated	
Critics' Choice Movie Awards	December 11, 2016	Best Actor	Denzel Washington	Nominated	
Critics' Choice Movie Awards	December 11, 2016	Best Supporting Actress	Viola Davis	Won	
Critics' Choice Movie Awards	December 11, 2016	Best Acting Ensemble	The cast of Fences	Nominated	
Critics' Choice Movie Awards	December 11, 2016	Best Adapted Screenplay	August Wilson	Nominated	
Dallas–Fort Worth Film Critics Association	December 13, 2016	Best Actor	Denzel Washington	2nd Place	
Dallas–Fort Worth Film Critics Association	December 13, 2016	Best Supporting Actress	Viola Davis	Won	
Detroit Film Critics Society	December 19, 2016	Best Actor	Denzel Washington	Nominated	
Detroit Film Critics Society	December 19, 2016	Best Supporting Actress	Viola Davis	Won (Note: Tied with Greta Gerwig for 20th Century Women)	
Detroit Film Critics Society	December 19, 2016	Best Director	Denzel Washington	Nominated	
Dorian Awards	January 26, 2017	Film Performance of the Year — Actor	Denzel Washington	Nominated	
Dorian Awards	January 26, 2017	Film Performance of the Year — Actress	Viola Davis	Won	
Florida Film Critics Circle	December 23, 2016	Best Actor	Denzel Washington	Nominated	
Florida Film Critics Circle	December 23, 2016	Best Supporting Actress	Viola Davis	Runner-up	
Florida Film Critics Circle	December 23, 2016	Best Adapted Screenplay	August Wilson	Nominated	
Golden Globe Awards	January 8, 2017	Best Actor – Motion Picture Drama	Denzel Washington	Nominated	
Golden Globe Awards	January 8, 2017	Best Supporting Actress – Motion Picture	Viola Davis	Won	
Golden Tomato Awards	January 12, 2017	Best Drama Movie 2016	Fences	4th Place	
Houston Film Critics Society	January 6, 2017	Best Actor	Denzel Washington	Nominated	
Houston Film Critics Society	January 6, 2017	Best Supporting Actress	Viola Davis	Won	
IndieWire Critics Poll	December 19, 2016	Best Actor	Denzel Washington	5th Place	
IndieWire Critics Poll	December 19, 2016	Best Supporting Actress	Viola Davis	4th Place	
London Film Critics Circle	January 22, 2017	Supporting Actress of the Year	Viola Davis	Nominated	
NAACP Image Awards	February 11, 2017	Outstanding Motion Picture	Fences	Nominated	
NAACP Image Awards	February 11, 2017	Outstanding Actor in a Motion Picture	Denzel Washington	Won	
NAACP Image Awards	February 11, 2017	Outstanding Supporting Actress in a Motion Picture	Viola Davis	Won	
National Society of Film Critics	January 7, 2017	Best Actor	Denzel Washington	2nd Place	
New York Film Critics Online	December 11, 2016	Best Supporting Actress	Viola Davis	Won	
New York Film Critics Online	December 11, 2016	Top 12 Films	Fences	Won	
Online Film Critics Society	January 3, 2017	Best Actor	Denzel Washington	Nominated	
Online Film Critics Society	January 3, 2017	Best Supporting Actress	Viola Davis	Nominated	
Producers Guild of America	January 28, 2017	Best Theatrical Motion Picture	Todd Black, Scott Rudin and Denzel Washington	Nominated	
San Francisco Film Critics Circle	December 11, 2016	Best Actor	Denzel Washington	Won	
San Francisco Film Critics Circle	December 11, 2016	Best Supporting Actress	Viola Davis	Won	
San Francisco Film Critics Circle	December 11, 2016	Best Adapted Screenplay	August Wilson	Nominated	
Santa Barbara International Film Festival	February 3, 2017	Virtuosos Award	Stephen McKinley Henderson	Won	
Santa Barbara International Film Festival	February 3, 2017	Maltin Modern Master Award	Denzel Washington	Won	
Satellite Awards	February 19, 2017	Best Film	Fences	Nominated	
Satellite Awards	February 19, 2017	Best Director	Denzel Washington	Nominated	
Satellite Awards	February 19, 2017	Best Actor	Denzel Washington	Nominated	
Satellite Awards	February 19, 2017	Best Supporting Actress	Viola Davis	Nominated	
Screen Actors Guild Awards	January 29, 2017	Outstanding Performance by a Male Actor in a Leading Role	Denzel Washington	Won	
Screen Actors Guild Awards	January 29, 2017	Outstanding Performance by a Female Actor in a Supporting Role	Viola Davis	Won	
Screen Actors Guild Awards	January 29, 2017	Outstanding Performance by a Cast in a Motion Picture	The cast of Fences	Nominated	
St. Louis Film Critics Association	December 18, 2016	Best Supporting Actress	Viola Davis	Won	
St. Louis Film Critics Association	December 18, 2016	Best Adapted Screenplay	August Wilson	Nominated	
Toronto Film Critics Association	December 11, 2016	Best Supporting Actress	Viola Davis	Runner-up	
USC Scripter Awards	February 11, 2017	Best Screenplay	August Wilson	Nominated	
Vancouver Film Critics Circle	December 20, 2016	Best Actor	Denzel Washington	Nominated	
Vancouver Film Critics Circle	December 20, 2016	Best Supporting Actress	Viola Davis	Nominated	
Washington D.C. Area Film Critics Association	December 5, 2016	Best Actor	Denzel Washington	Nominated	
Washington D.C. Area Film Critics Association	December 5, 2016	Best Supporting Actress	Viola Davis	Won	
Washington D.C. Area Film Critics Association	December 5, 2016	Best Ensemble	The cast of Fences	Nominated	
Washington D.C. Area Film Critics Association	December 5, 2016	Best Adapted Screenplay	August Wilson	Nominated	
Writers Guild of America Awards	February 19, 2017	Best Adapted Screenplay	August Wilson	Nominated	
