= List of accolades received by Hell or High Water =

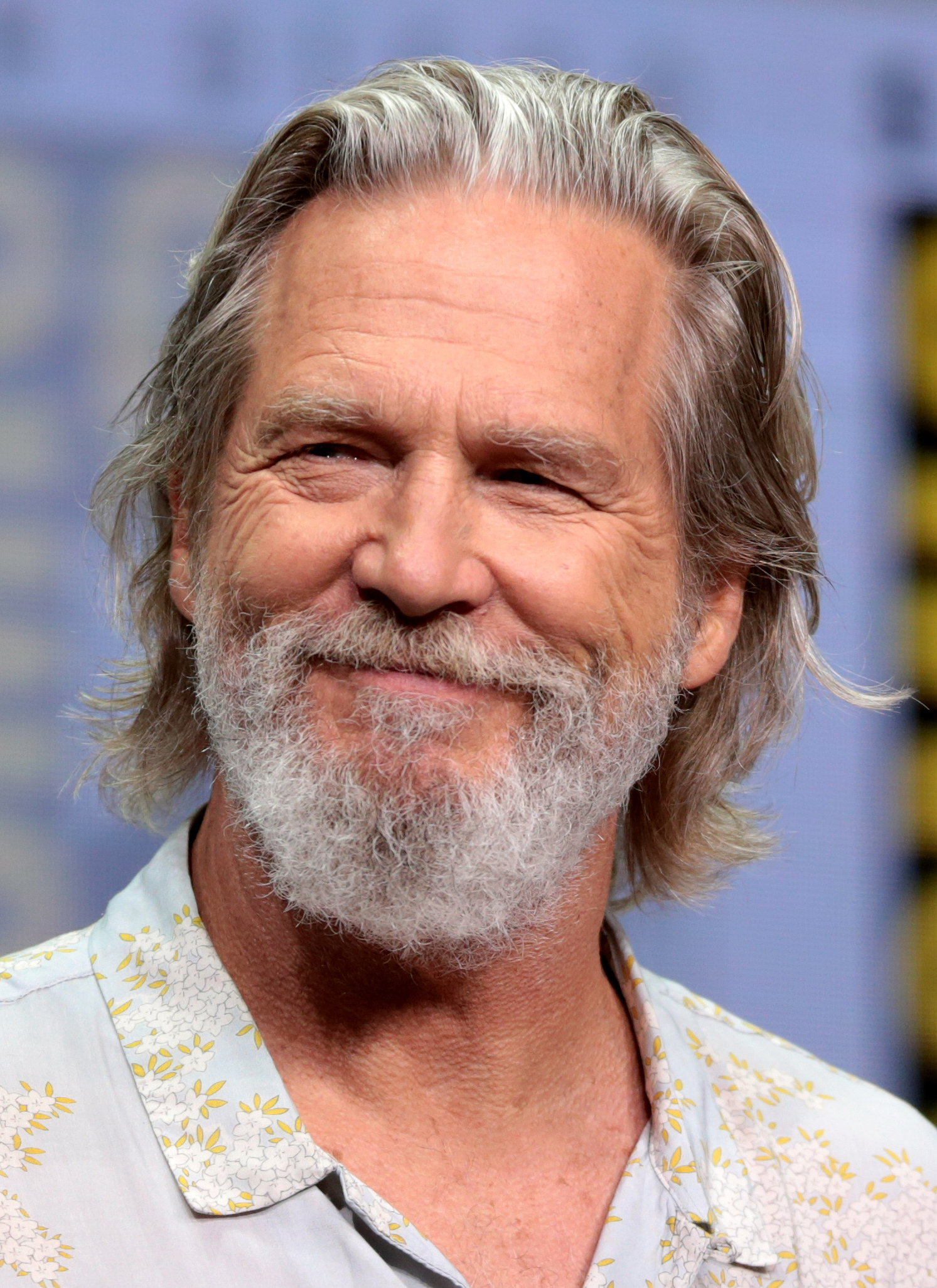
- Jeff Bridges has received several awards and nominations for his performance in the film
Accolades
Award	Won	Nominated	Standing
AACTA International Awards	0	2
AARP Annual Movies for Grownups Awards	1	2
Academy Awards	0	4
ACE Eddie Awards	0	1
African-American Film Critics Association	0	1	9th Place
Alliance of Women Film Journalists	0	7
Art Directors Guild Awards	0	1
Austin Film Critics Association	0	4	8th Place
Belgian Film Critics Association	0	1
British Academy Film Awards	0	3
Cannes Film Festival	0	1
Chicago Film Critics Association	0	2
Critics' Choice Awards	0	6
Dallas-Fort Worth Film Critics Association	0	4	2nd Place, 4th Place (2), 5th Place
Detroit Film Critics Society	1	5
Empire Awards	0	2
Florida Film Critics Circle	1	3
Golden Globe Awards	0	3
Golden Tomato Awards	1	2	2nd Place
Gotham Awards	0	2
Houston Film Critics Society	2	5
Independent Spirit Awards	1	3
IndieWire Critics Poll	0	3	4th Place (2), 9th Place
Location Managers Guild Awards	0	2
London Film Critics Circle	0	1
MPSE Golden Reel Awards	0	1
National Board of Review	1	1
National Society of Film Critics	0	2	2nd Place, 3rd Place
New York Film Critics Online	1	1
Online Film Critics Society	1	3
Producers Guild of America	0	1
San Diego Film Critics Society	6	10
San Francisco Film Critics Circle	0	6
Satellite Awards	1	3
Saturn Awards	0	2
Screen Actors Guild Awards	0	1
Seattle Film Critics Society	0	5
St. Louis Film Critics Association	1	4	Runner-up
Vancouver Film Critics Circle	0	2
Washington D.C. Area Film Critics Association	1	6
Writers Guild of America Awards	0	1
- Total number of awards and nominations
Totals	18	117	
- References

Hell or High Water is a 2016 American neo-Western heist-crime film directed by David Mackenzie and written by Taylor Sheridan. Starring Chris Pine, Ben Foster and Jeff Bridges, the film follows two brothers who carry out a series of bank robberies to save their family farm. The film premiered at the Cannes Film Festival on May 16, 2016, and began a limited release on August 12, 2016, in the United States, followed by a wide release on August 26. The film was released to universal acclaim, with Rotten Tomatoes gave an approval rating of 98% based on 240 reviews, with an average rating of 8.5/10 and Metacritic gave a score of 88 out of 100, based on 47 reviews.

Hell or High Water received four nominations at Academy Awards, including Best Picture, Best Supporting Actor for Bridges, Best Original Screenplay and Best Film Editing. The film received three nominations at British Academy Film Awards, including Best Actor in a Supporting Role for Bridges, Best Original Screenplay and Best Cinematography. The film received six nominations at Critics' Choice Awards, including Best Picture, Best Director, Best Supporting Actor for Bridges and Foster, Best Acting Ensemble and Best Original Screenplay. The film received three nominations at Golden Globe Awards, including Best Motion Picture – Drama, Best Supporting Actor – Motion Picture for Bridges and Best Screenplay. The film won Best Supporting Actor for Bridges and nominated for Best Film and Best Original Screenplay at Satellite Awards.

== Accolades ==
Award	Date of ceremony	Category	Recipient(s)	Result	Ref.
AACTA International Awards	January 8, 2017	Best Supporting Actor	Jeff Bridges	Nominated	
AACTA International Awards	January 8, 2017	Best Screenplay	Taylor Sheridan	Nominated	
AARP Annual Movies for Grownups Awards	February 6, 2017	Best Supporting Actor	Jeff Bridges	Won	
AARP Annual Movies for Grownups Awards	February 6, 2017	Best Director	David Mackenzie	Nominated	
Academy Awards	February 26, 2017	Best Picture	Carla Hacken and Julie Yorn	Nominated	
Academy Awards	February 26, 2017	Best Supporting Actor	Jeff Bridges	Nominated	
Academy Awards	February 26, 2017	Best Original Screenplay	Taylor Sheridan	Nominated	
Academy Awards	February 26, 2017	Best Film Editing	Jake Roberts	Nominated	
ACE Eddie Awards	January 27, 2017	Best Edited Feature Film – Dramatic	Jake Roberts	Nominated	
African-American Film Critics Association	February 8, 2017	Top 10 Films	Hell or High Water	9th Place	
Alliance of Women Film Journalists	December 21, 2016	Best Film	Hell or High Water	Nominated	
Alliance of Women Film Journalists	December 21, 2016	Best Director	David Mackenzie	Nominated	
Alliance of Women Film Journalists	December 21, 2016	Best Supporting Actor	Jeff Bridges	Nominated	
Alliance of Women Film Journalists	December 21, 2016	Best Supporting Actor	Ben Foster	Nominated	
Alliance of Women Film Journalists	December 21, 2016	Best Screenplay, Original	Taylor Sheridan	Nominated	
Alliance of Women Film Journalists	December 21, 2016	Best Cinematography	Giles Nuttgens	Nominated	
Alliance of Women Film Journalists	December 21, 2016	Best Ensemble Cast – Casting Director	Jo Edna Boldin and Richard Hicks	Nominated	
Art Directors Guild Awards	February 11, 2017	Excellence in Production Design for a Contemporary Film	Tom Duffield	Nominated	
Austin Film Critics Association	December 28, 2016	Best Film	Hell or High Water	8th Place	
Austin Film Critics Association	December 28, 2016	Best Supporting Actor	Jeff Bridges	Nominated	
Austin Film Critics Association	December 28, 2016	Best Supporting Actor	Ben Foster	Nominated	
Austin Film Critics Association	December 28, 2016	Best Score	Nick Cave and Warren Ellis	Nominated	
Australian Film Critics Association	March 7, 2017	Best International Film (English Language)	Hell or High Water	Nominated	
Belgian Film Critics Association	January 7, 2017	Grand Prix	Hell or High Water	Nominated	
British Academy Film Awards	February 12, 2017	Best Actor in a Supporting Role	Jeff Bridges	Nominated	
British Academy Film Awards	February 12, 2017	Best Original Screenplay	Taylor Sheridan	Nominated	
British Academy Film Awards	February 12, 2017	Best Cinematography	Giles Nuttgens	Nominated	
Cannes Film Festival	May 22, 2016	Un Certain Regard	David Mackenzie	Nominated	
Chicago Film Critics Association	December 15, 2016	Best Supporting Actor	Ben Foster	Nominated	
Chicago Film Critics Association	December 15, 2016	Best Original Screenplay	Taylor Sheridan	Nominated	
Critics' Choice Awards	December 11, 2016	Best Picture	Hell or High Water	Nominated	
Critics' Choice Awards	December 11, 2016	Best Director	David Mackenzie	Nominated	
Critics' Choice Awards	December 11, 2016	Best Supporting Actor	Jeff Bridges	Nominated	
Critics' Choice Awards	December 11, 2016	Best Supporting Actor	Ben Foster	Nominated	
Critics' Choice Awards	December 11, 2016	Best Acting Ensemble	The cast of Hell or High Water	Nominated	
Critics' Choice Awards	December 11, 2016	Best Original Screenplay	Taylor Sheridan	Nominated	
Dallas–Fort Worth Film Critics Association	December 13, 2016	Best Film	Hell or High Water	4th Place	
Dallas–Fort Worth Film Critics Association	December 13, 2016	Best Supporting Actor	Jeff Bridges	2nd Place	
Dallas–Fort Worth Film Critics Association	December 13, 2016	Best Supporting Actor	Ben Foster	5th Place	
Dallas–Fort Worth Film Critics Association	December 13, 2016	Best Director	David Mackenzie	4th Place	
Detroit Film Critics Society	December 19, 2016	Best Film	Hell or High Water	Nominated	
Detroit Film Critics Society	December 19, 2016	Best Supporting Actor	Jeff Bridges	Won	
Detroit Film Critics Society	December 19, 2016	Best Director	David Mackenzie	Nominated	
Detroit Film Critics Society	December 19, 2016	Best Screenplay	Taylor Sheridan	Nominated	
Detroit Film Critics Society	December 19, 2016	Best Ensemble	The cast of Hell or High Water	Nominated	
Empire Awards	March 19, 2017	Best Thriller	Hell or High Water	Nominated	
Empire Awards	March 19, 2017	Best Screenplay	Taylor Sheridan	Nominated	
Florida Film Critics Circle	December 23, 2016	Best Film	Hell or High Water	Nominated	
Florida Film Critics Circle	December 23, 2016	Best Supporting Actor	Jeff Bridges	Won	
Florida Film Critics Circle	December 23, 2016	Best Original Screenplay	Taylor Sheridan	Nominated	
Golden Globe Awards	January 8, 2017	Best Motion Picture – Drama	Hell or High Water	Nominated	
Golden Globe Awards	January 8, 2017	Best Supporting Actor – Motion Picture	Jeff Bridges	Nominated	
Golden Globe Awards	January 8, 2017	Best Screenplay	Taylor Sheridan	Nominated	
Golden Tomato Awards	January 12, 2017	Best Wide Release 2016	High or Hell Water	2nd Place	
Golden Tomato Awards	January 12, 2017	Best Thriller Movie 2016	High or Hell Water	Won	
Gotham Awards	November 28, 2016	Best Actor	Jeff Bridges	Nominated	
Gotham Awards	November 28, 2016	Best Screenplay	Taylor Sheridan	Nominated	
Houston Film Critics Society	January 6, 2017	Best Picture	Hell or High Water	Nominated	
Houston Film Critics Society	January 6, 2017	Best Supporting Actor	Jeff Bridges	Won	
Houston Film Critics Society	January 6, 2017	Best Supporting Actor	Ben Foster	Nominated	
Houston Film Critics Society	January 6, 2017	Best Director	David Mackenzie	Nominated	
Houston Film Critics Society	January 6, 2017	Best Screenplay	Taylor Sheridan	Won	
Independent Spirit Awards	February 25, 2017	Best Supporting Male	Ben Foster	Won	
Independent Spirit Awards	February 25, 2017	Best Screenplay	Taylor Sheridan	Nominated	
Independent Spirit Awards	February 25, 2017	Best Editing	Jake Roberts	Nominated	
IndieWire Critics Poll	December 19, 2016	Best Film	Hell or High Water	9th Place	
IndieWire Critics Poll	December 19, 2016	Best Supporting Actor	Jeff Bridges	4th Place	
IndieWire Critics Poll	December 19, 2016	Best Screenplay	Hell or High Water	4th Place	
Location Managers Guild Awards	April 8, 2017	Outstanding Locations in Contemporary Film	Erik Keeling-Torrez and Jonathan Slator	Nominated	
Location Managers Guild Awards	April 8, 2017	Outstanding Film Commission	New Mexico Film Office	Nominated	
London Film Critics Circle	January 22, 2017	Supporting Actor of the Year	Jeff Bridges	Nominated	
MPSE Golden Reel Awards	February 19, 2017	Feature English Language: Dialogue/ADR	Chris Battaglia, Frank Gaeta, Kathryn Madsen and Harrison Meyle	Nominated	
National Board of Review	January 4, 2017	Best Supporting Actor	Jeff Bridges	Won	
National Society of Film Critics	January 7, 2017	Best Supporting Actor	Jeff Bridges	2nd Place	
National Society of Film Critics	January 7, 2017	Best Screenplay	Taylor Sheridan	3rd Place	
New York Film Critics Online	December 11, 2016	Top 12 Films	Hell or High Water	Won	
Online Film Critics Society	January 3, 2017	Best Picture	Hell or High Water	Nominated	
Online Film Critics Society	January 3, 2017	Best Supporting Actor	Jeff Bridges	Nominated	
Online Film Critics Society	January 3, 2017	Best Original Screenplay	Taylor Sheridan	Won	
Producers Guild of America	January 28, 2017	Best Theatrical Motion Picture	Carla Hacken and Julie Yorn	Nominated	
San Diego Film Critics Society	December 12, 2016	Best Film	Hell or High Water	Won	
San Diego Film Critics Society	December 12, 2016	Best Director	David Mackenzie	Won	
San Diego Film Critics Society	December 12, 2016	Best Actor	Chris Pine	Nominated	
San Diego Film Critics Society	December 12, 2016	Best Supporting Actor	Jeff Bridges	Nominated	
San Diego Film Critics Society	December 12, 2016	Best Supporting Actor	Ben Foster	Won (Note: Tied with Mahershala Ali for Moonlight)	
San Diego Film Critics Society	December 12, 2016	Best Original Screenplay	Taylor Sheridan	Won	
San Diego Film Critics Society	December 12, 2016	Best Editing	Jake Roberts	Nominated	
San Diego Film Critics Society	December 12, 2016	Best Cinematography	Giles Nuttgens	Won	
San Diego Film Critics Society	December 12, 2016	Best Original Score	Hell or High Water	Nominated	
San Diego Film Critics Society	December 12, 2016	Best Ensemble	The cast of Hell or High Water	Won	
San Francisco Film Critics Circle	December 11, 2016	Best Film	Hell or High Water	Nominated	
San Francisco Film Critics Circle	December 11, 2016	Best Supporting Actor	Jeff Bridges	Nominated	
San Francisco Film Critics Circle	December 11, 2016	Best Supporting Actor	Ben Foster	Nominated	
San Francisco Film Critics Circle	December 11, 2016	Best Original Screenplay	Taylor Sheridan	Nominated	
San Francisco Film Critics Circle	December 11, 2016	Best Original Score	Nick Cave and Warren Ellis	Nominated	
San Francisco Film Critics Circle	December 11, 2016	Best Film Editing	Jake Roberts	Nominated	
Satellite Awards	February 19, 2017	Best Film	Hell or High Water	Nominated	
Satellite Awards	February 19, 2017	Best Supporting Actor	Jeff Bridges	Won	
Satellite Awards	February 19, 2017	Best Original Screenplay	Taylor Sheridan	Nominated	
Saturn Awards	June 28, 2017	Best Thriller Film	Hell or High Water	Nominated	
Saturn Awards	June 28, 2017	Best Writing	Taylor Sheridan	Nominated	
Screen Actors Guild Awards	January 29, 2017	Outstanding Performance by a Male Actor in a Supporting Role	Jeff Bridges	Nominated	
Seattle Film Critics Society	January 5, 2017	Best Picture of the Year	Hell or High Water	Nominated	
Seattle Film Critics Society	January 5, 2017	Best Actor in a Supporting Role	Jeff Bridges	Nominated	
Seattle Film Critics Society	January 5, 2017	Best Screenplay	Taylor Sheridan	Nominated	
Seattle Film Critics Society	January 5, 2017	Best Film Editing	Jake Roberts	Nominated	
Seattle Film Critics Society	January 5, 2017	Best Ensemble Cast	The cast of Hell or High Water	Nominated	
St. Louis Film Critics Association	December 18, 2016	Best Film	Hell or High Water	Runner-up (Note: Tied with Manchester by the Sea)	
St. Louis Film Critics Association	December 18, 2016	Best Director	David Mackenzie	Nominated	
St. Louis Film Critics Association	December 18, 2016	Best Supporting Actor	Jeff Bridges	Nominated	
St. Louis Film Critics Association	December 18, 2016	Best Original Screenplay	Taylor Sheridan	Won	
Vancouver Film Critics Circle	December 20, 2016	Best Supporting Actor	Jeff Bridges	Nominated	
Vancouver Film Critics Circle	December 20, 2016	Best Screenplay	Taylor Sheridan	Nominated	
Washington D.C. Area Film Critics Association	December 5, 2016	Best Film	Hell or High Water	Nominated	
Washington D.C. Area Film Critics Association	December 5, 2016	Best Director	David Mackenzie	Nominated	
Washington D.C. Area Film Critics Association	December 5, 2016	Best Supporting Actor	Jeff Bridges	Nominated	
Washington D.C. Area Film Critics Association	December 5, 2016	Best Supporting Actor	Ben Foster	Nominated	
Washington D.C. Area Film Critics Association	December 5, 2016	Best Ensemble	The cast of Hell or High Water	Won	
Washington D.C. Area Film Critics Association	December 5, 2016	Best Original Screenplay	Taylor Sheridan	Nominated	
Writers Guild of America Awards	February 19, 2017	Best Original Screenplay	Taylor Sheridan	Nominated	
