= London Film Critics' Circle Award for British Actress of the Year =

Former British film award

The London Film Critics Circle Award for British/Irish Actress of the Year was an annual award given by the London Film Critics Circle.

== Winners ==
=== 1990s ===
Year	Winner	Film	Role
1993	Miranda Richardson	Damage	Ingrid Fleming
1994	Crissy Rock	Ladybird, Ladybird	Maggie Conlan
1995	Kate Winslet	Heavenly Creatures	Juliet Hulme
1996	Brenda Blethyn	Secrets & Lies	Cynthia Rose Purley
1997	Judi Dench	Mrs Brown	Queen Victoria
1998	Helena Bonham Carter	The Wings of the Dove	Kate Croy
1998	Julie Christie	Afterglow	Phyllis Hart
1998	Minnie Driver	The Governess	Rosina da Silva / Mary Blackchurch
1998	Louise Goodall	My Name Is Joe	Sarah Downie
1998	Kristin Scott Thomas	The Horse Whisperer	Annie Maclean
1998	Kate Winslet	Titanic	Rose DeWitt Bukater
1998	Catherine Zeta-Jones	The Mask of Zorro	Elena Montero
1999	Emily Watson	Angela's Ashes and Hilary and Jackie	Angela McCourt and Jacqueline du Pré

=== 2000s ===
Year	Winner	Film	Role
2000	Julie Walters	Billy Elliot	Sandra Wilkinson
2000	Brenda Blethyn	Saving Grace	Grace Trevethyn
2000	Janet McTeer	Tumbleweeds	Mary Jo Walker
2000	Emily Watson	The Luzhin Defence	Natalia Katkov
2000	Kate Winslet	Quills	Madeleine "Maddy" LeClerc
2001	Judi Dench	Iris	Iris Murdoch
2002	Lesley Manville	All or Nothing	Penny
2002	Samantha Morton	Morvern Callar	Morvern Callar
2002	Miranda Richardson	Spider	Yvonne / Mrs. Cleg
2003	Anne Reid	The Mother	May
2003	Helen Mirren	Calendar Girls	Chris Harper
2003	Julie Walters	Calendar Girls	Annie Clarke
2003	Charlotte Rampling	Swimming Pool	Sarah Morton
2003	Tilda Swinton	Young Adam	Ella Gault
2004	Eva Birthistle	Ae Fond Kiss...	Roisin Hanlon
2004	Kate Winslet	Eternal Sunshine of the Spotless Mind	Clementine Kruczynski
2004	Judi Dench	Ladies in Lavender	Ursula Widdington
2004	Emily Mortimer	Dear Frankie	Lizzie
2004	Natalie Press	My Summer of Love	Mona
2005	Rachel Weisz	The Constant Gardener	Tessa Abbott-Quayle
2005	Judi Dench	Mrs. Henderson Presents	Laura Henderson
2005	Keira Knightley	Pride & Prejudice	Elizabeth Bennet
2005	Kristin Scott Thomas	Keeping Mum	Gloria Goodfellow
2005	Emily Watson	Separate Lies	Anne Manning
2006	Helen Mirren	The Queen	Queen Elizabeth II
2006	Judi Dench	Notes on a Scandal	Barbara Covett
2006	Kate Dickie	Red Road	Jackie Morrison
2006	Lorraine Stanley	London to Brighton	Kelly
2006	Kate Winslet	Little Children	Sarah Pierce
2007	Julie Christie	Away from Her	Fiona Anderson
2007	Helena Bonham Carter	Sweeney Todd: The Demon Barber of Fleet Street	Nellie Lovett
2007	Keira Knightley	Atonement	Cecilia Tallis
2007	Sienna Miller	Interview	Katya
2007	Samantha Morton	Control	Deborah Curtis
2008	Kristin Scott Thomas	I've Loved You So Long	Juliette Fontaine
2008	Rebecca Hall	Vicky Cristina Barcelona	Vicky
2008	Sally Hawkins	Happy-Go-Lucky	Pauline "Poppy" Cross
2008	Tilda Swinton	Julia	Julia
2008	Kate Winslet	The Reader and Revolutionary Road	Hanna Schmitz and April Wheeler
2009	Carey Mulligan	An Education	Jenny Mellor
2009	Emily Blunt	The Young Victoria	Queen Victoria
2009	Katie Jarvis	Fish Tank	Mia Williams
2009	Helen Mirren	The Last Station	Sophia Tolstaya
2009	Kristin Scott Thomas	Nowhere Boy	Mimi Smith

=== 2010s ===
Year	Winner	Film	Role
2010	Lesley Manville	Another Year	Mary Smith
2010	Helena Bonham Carter	The King's Speech	Queen Elizabeth
2010	Rosamund Pike	Barney's Version	Miriam Grant
2010	Ruth Sheen	Another Year	Gerri Hepple
2010	Tilda Swinton	I Am Love	Emma Recchi
2011	Olivia Colman	The Iron Lady and Tyrannosaur	Carol Thatcher and Hannah
2011	Carey Mulligan	Drive and Shame	Irene Gabriel and Sissy Sullivan
2011	Vanessa Redgrave	Anonymous and Coriolanus	Elizabeth I and Volumnia
2011	Tilda Swinton	We Need to Talk About Kevin	Eva Khatchadourian
2011	Rachel Weisz	The Deep Blue Sea	Hester Collyer
2012	Andrea Riseborough	Shadow Dancer	Colette McVeigh
2012	Emily Blunt	Looper and Your Sister's Sister	Sara and Iris
2012	Judi Dench	The Best Exotic Marigold Hotel and Skyfall	Evelyn Greenslade and M
2012	Alice Lowe	Sightseers	Tina
2012	Helen Mirren	Hitchcock	Alma Reville
2013	Judi Dench	Philomena	Philomena Lee
2013	Lindsay Duncan	About Time, Last Passenger and Le Week-End	Mary Lake, Elaine Middleton and Meg Burrows
2013	Naomie Harris	Mandela: Long Walk to Freedom	Winnie Madikizela
2013	Sally Hawkins	Blue Jasmine	Ginger
2013	Emma Thompson	Beautiful Creatures and Saving Mr. Banks	Mavis Lincoln / Sarafine Duchannes and P. L. Travers
2014	Rosamund Pike	Gone Girl and What We Did on Our Holiday	Amy Elliott-Dunne and Abi McLeod
2014	Emily Blunt	Edge of Tomorrow and Into the Woods	Rita Vrataski and the Baker's Wife
2014	Felicity Jones	The Theory of Everything	Jane Wilde
2014	Keira Knightley	The Imitation Game, Begin Again and Say When	Joan Clarke, Gretta James and Megan Burch
2014	Gugu Mbatha-Raw	Belle	Dido Elizabeth Belle
2015	Saoirse Ronan	Brooklyn and Lost River	Eilis Lacey and Rat
2015	Emily Blunt	Sicario	Kate Macer
2015	Carey Mulligan	Far from the Madding Crowd and Suffragette	Bathsheba Everdene and Maud Watts
2015	Charlotte Rampling	45 Years and The Forbidden Room	Kate Mercer and the Ostler's Mother
2015	Kate Winslet	The Dressmaker, A Little Chaos, and Steve Jobs	Myrtle "Tilly" Dunnage, Sabine de Barra, and Joanna Hoffman
2016	Kate Beckinsale	Love and Friendship	Lady Susan Vernon
2016	Rebecca Hall	Christine	Christine Chubbuck
2016	Naomie Harris	Moonlight, Our Kind of Traitor and Collateral Beauty	Paula, Gail MacKendrick, and Madeleine
2016	Ruth Negga	Loving and Iona	Mildred Loving and Iona
2016	Hayley Squires	I, Daniel Blake	Katie Morgan
2017	Sally Hawkins	Maudie, Paddington 2, and The Shape of Water	Maud Lewis, Mary Brown, and Elisa Esposito
2017	Emily Beecham	Daphne	Daphne Vitale
2017	Judi Dench	Victoria & Abdul and Murder on the Orient Express	Queen Victoria and Princess Natalia Dragomiroff
2017	Florence Pugh	Lady Macbeth	Katherine Lester
2017	Saoirse Ronan	Lady Bird and Loving Vincent	Christine "Lady Bird" McPherson and Marguerite Gachet
2018	Jessie Buckley	Beast	Moll Huntford
2018	Emily Blunt	A Quiet Place, Mary Poppins Returns, and Sherlock Gnomes	Evelyn Abbott, Mary Poppins, and Juliet
2018	Olivia Colman	The Favourite	Queen Anne
2018	Claire Foy	First Man, The Girl in the Spider's Web, and Unsane	Janet Armstrong, Lisbeth Salander, and Sawyer Valentini
2018	Rachel Weisz	Disobedience and The Favourite	Ronit Krushka and Sarah Churchill, Duchess of Marlborough
2019	Florence Pugh	Fighting with My Family, Little Women, and Midsommar	Saraya "Paige" Knight, Amy March, and Dani Ardor
2019	Jessie Buckley	Wild Rose and Judy	Rose-Lynn Harlan and Rosalyn Wilder
2019	Cynthia Erivo	Harriet	Harriet Tubman
2019	Lesley Manville	Maleficent: Mistress of Evil and Ordinary Love	Flittle and Joan Thompson
2019	Saoirse Ronan	Little Women	Josephine "Jo" March

=== 2020s ===
Year	Winner	Film	Role
2020	Morfydd Clark	Eternal Beauty and Saint Maud	Young Jane and Katie / Maud
2020	Bukky Bakray	Rocks	Olushola "Rocks" Omotoso
2020	Jessie Buckley	I'm Thinking of Ending Things and Misbehaviour	Young Woman and Jo Robinson
2020	Vanessa Kirby	Pieces of a Woman and The World to Come	Martha Weiss and Tallie
2020	Carey Mulligan	The Dig and Promising Young Woman	Edith Pretty and Cassandra "Cassie" Thomas
2021	Tilda Swinton	The French Dispatch, Memoria and The Souvenir Part II	J.K.L. Berensen, Jessica Holland and Rosalind Hart
2021	Jessie Buckley	The Lost Daughter	Young Leda Caruso
2021	Olivia Colman	The Electrical Life of Louis Wain, The Lost Daughter, The Mitchells vs. the Machines, Mothering Sunday, and Ron's Gone Wrong	The Narrator, Leda Caruso, PAL, Clarrie Niven, and Donka Pudowski
2021	Ruth Negga	Passing and Poly Styrene: I Am a Cliché	Clare Bellew and the Narrator
2021	Joanna Scanlan	After Love	Mary Hussain
2022	Florence Pugh	Don't Worry Darling, Puss in Boots: The Last Wish and The Wonder	Alice Chambers, Goldilocks, and Elizabeth "Lib" Wright
2022	Jessie Buckley	Men, Scrooge: A Christmas Carol, and Women Talking	Harper Marlowe, Isabel Fezziwig, and Mariche Loewen
2022	Olivia Colman	Empire of Light, Joyride, Puss in Boots: The Last Wish, and Scrooge: A Christmas Carol	Hilary Small, Joy, Mama Bear, and Past
2022	Emma Thompson	Good Luck to You, Leo Grande and Matilda the Musical	Nancy Stokes / Susan Robinson and Miss Trunchbull
2022	Letitia Wright	Aisha, Black Panther: Wakanda Forever, and The Silent Twins	Aisha Osagie, Shuri, and June Gibbons
