= List of accolades received by Nocturnal Animals =

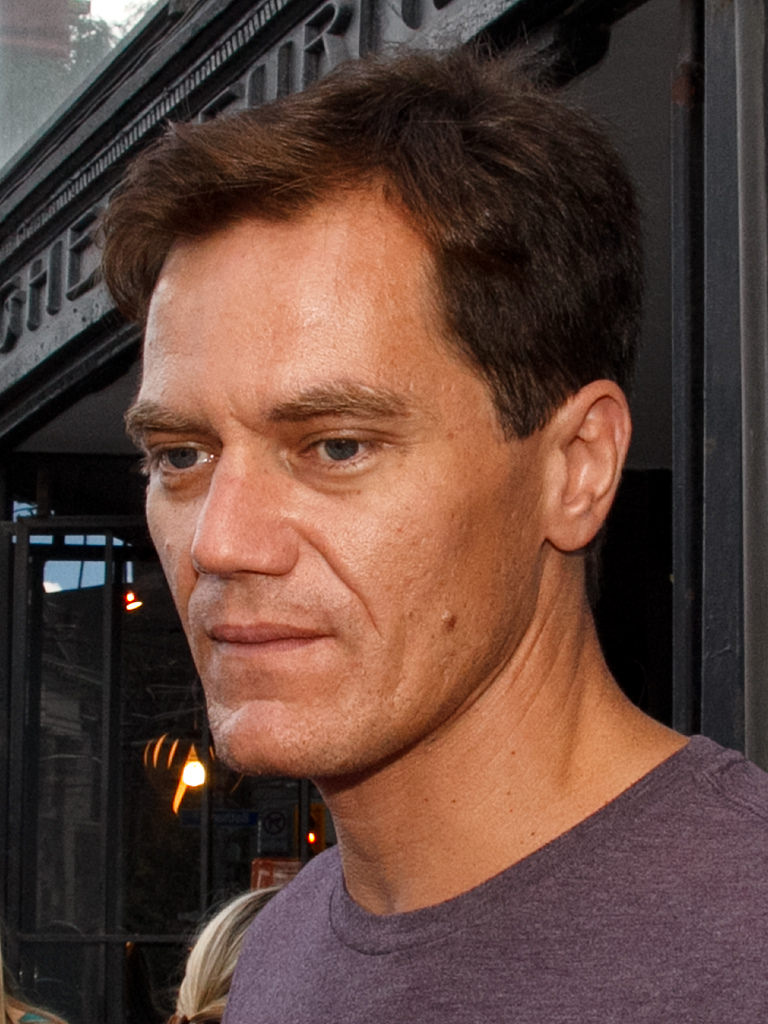
- Michael Shannon received critical acclaim for his performance in the film.
Accolades
Award	Won	Nominated	Standing
AACTA International Awards	0	1
Academy Awards	0	1
Alliance of Women Film Journalists	0	2
Art Directors Guild Awards	0	1
Austin Film Critics Association	0	2
British Academy Film Awards	0	9
Chicago Film Critics Association	0	1
Costume Designers Guild	0	1
Critics' Choice Awards	0	3
Dallas-Fort Worth Film Critics Association	0	1	3rd Place
David di Donatello Awards	1	1
Dorian Awards	0	1
Empire Awards	0	1
Florida Film Critics Circle	0	2
Golden Globe Awards	1	3
Hollywood Film Awards	1	1
Houston Film Critics Society	0	5
IndieWire Critics Poll	0	3	9th Place, 10th Place (2)
Jupiter Awards	0	1
London Film Critics Circle	0	3
Make-Up Artists and Hair Stylists Guild	1	2
National Society of Film Critics	0	1	3rd Place
Online Film Critics Society	0	2
San Diego Film Critics Society	1	11	Runner-up
San Francisco Film Critics Circle	0	2
Santa Barbara International Film Festival	1	1
Satellite Awards	0	3
Screen Actors Guild Awards	0	1
St. Louis Film Critics Association	0	3
Toronto Film Critics Association	0	1	Runner-up
Venice Film Festival	1	2
Washington D.C. Area Film Critics Association	0	3
Women Film Critics Circle	1	2
Writers Guild of America Awards	0	1
- Total number of awards and nominations (Note: Certain award groups do not simply award one winner. They recognize several different recipients and have runners-up. Since this is a specific recognition and is different from losing an award, runner-up mentions are considered wins in this award tally.)
Totals	15	79	
- References

Nocturnal Animals is a 2016 American neo-noir psychological thriller film written, co-produced and directed by Tom Ford. Starring Amy Adams, Jake Gyllenhaal, Michael Shannon and Aaron Taylor-Johnson, the film focuses on the gripping story of a broken-hearted man who wreaks vengeance on his ex-wife decades later with his unpublished novel. The film had its world premiere at the Venice Film Festival on September 2, 2016 and was released to theaters on November 18, 2016. The film was released to positive reviews, with Rotten Tomatoes gave an approval rating of 74%, based on 237 reviews, with an average rating of 7/10 and Metacritic gave a score of 67 out of 100, based on 45 reviews.

Nocturnal Animals received an Academy Award for Best Supporting Actor nomination for Shannon at the 89th Academy Awards. The film received nine nominations at the 70th British Academy Film Awards, including Best Actor in a Leading Role for Gyllenhaal, Best Actor in a Supporting Role for Taylor-Johnson, Best Direction, Best Adapted Screenplay, Best Cinematography, Best Editing, Best Film Music, Best Production Design and Best Makeup and Hair. The film received three nominations at the 22nd Critics' Choice Awards, including Best Supporting Actor for Shannon, Best Adapted Screenplay and Best Cinematography. The film won the Best Supporting Actor – Motion Picture for Taylor-Johnson and was nominated for Best Director and Best Screenplay at the 74th Golden Globe Awards. The film also received three nominations at the 21st Satellite Awards, including Best Film, Best Director and Best Actress for Adams.

== Accolades ==
Award	Date of ceremony	Category	Recipients	Result	Ref.
AACTA International Awards	January 8, 2017	Best Supporting Actor	Michael Shannon	Nominated	
Academy Awards	February 26, 2017	Best Supporting Actor	Michael Shannon	Nominated	
Alliance of Women Film Journalists	December 21, 2016	Best Supporting Actor	Michael Shannon	Nominated	
Alliance of Women Film Journalists	December 21, 2016	Best Adapted Screenplay	Tom Ford	Nominated	
Art Directors Guild Awards	February 11, 2017	Excellence in Production Design for a Contemporary Film	Shane Valentino	Nominated	
Austin Film Critics Association	December 28, 2016	Best Supporting Actor	Michael Shannon	Nominated	
Austin Film Critics Association	December 28, 2016	Best Adapted Screenplay	Tom Ford	Nominated	
Australian Film Critics Association	March 7, 2017	Best International Film (English Language)	Nocturnal Animals	Nominated	
BAFTA Awards	February 12, 2017	Best Direction	Tom Ford	Nominated	
BAFTA Awards	February 12, 2017	Best Actor in a Leading Role	Jake Gyllenhaal	Nominated	
BAFTA Awards	February 12, 2017	Best Actor in a Supporting Role	Aaron Taylor-Johnson	Nominated	
BAFTA Awards	February 12, 2017	Best Adapted Screenplay	Tom Ford	Nominated	
BAFTA Awards	February 12, 2017	Best Cinematography	Seamus McGarvey	Nominated	
BAFTA Awards	February 12, 2017	Best Editing	Joan Sobel	Nominated	
BAFTA Awards	February 12, 2017	Best Film Music	Abel Korzeniowski	Nominated	
BAFTA Awards	February 12, 2017	Best Production Design	Meg Everist and Shane Valentino	Nominated	
BAFTA Awards	February 12, 2017	Best Makeup and Hair	Donald Mowat and Yolanda Toussieng	Nominated	
Chicago Film Critics Association	December 15, 2016	Best Supporting Actor	Michael Shannon	Nominated	
Costume Designers Guild	February 21, 2017	Excellence in Contemporary Film	Arianne Phillips	Nominated	
Critics' Choice Awards	December 11, 2016	Best Supporting Actor	Michael Shannon	Nominated	
Critics' Choice Awards	December 11, 2016	Best Adapted Screenplay	Tom Ford	Nominated	
Critics' Choice Awards	December 11, 2016	Best Cinematography	Seamus McGarvey	Nominated	
Dallas–Fort Worth Film Critics Association	December 13, 2016	Best Supporting Actor	Michael Shannon	3rd Place	
David di Donatello Awards	March 27, 2017	Best Foreign Film	Nocturnal Animals	Won	
Dorian Awards	January 26, 2017	Campy Film of the Year	Nocturnal Animals	Nominated	
Empire Awards	March 19, 2017	Best Thriller	Nocturnal Animals	Nominated	
Florida Film Critics Circle	December 23, 2016	Best Supporting Actor	Michael Shannon	Nominated	
Florida Film Critics Circle	December 23, 2016	Best Adapted Screenplay	Tom Ford	Nominated	
Golden Globe Awards	January 8, 2017	Best Supporting Actor – Motion Picture	Aaron Taylor-Johnson	Won	
Golden Globe Awards	January 8, 2017	Best Director	Tom Ford	Nominated	
Golden Globe Awards	January 8, 2017	Best Screenplay	Tom Ford	Nominated	
Hollywood Film Awards	November 6, 2016	Hollywood Breakthrough Director Award	Tom Ford	Won	
Houston Film Critics Society	January 6, 2017	Best Picture	Nocturnal Animals	Nominated	
Houston Film Critics Society	January 6, 2017	Best Actor	Jake Gyllenhaal	Nominated	
Houston Film Critics Society	January 6, 2017	Best Supporting Actor	Michael Shannon	Nominated	
Houston Film Critics Society	January 6, 2017	Best Cinematography	Seamus McGarvey	Nominated	
Houston Film Critics Society	January 6, 2017	Best Original Score	Abel Korzeniowski	Nominated	
IndieWire Critics Poll	December 19, 2016	Best Supporting Actor	Michael Shannon	9th Place	
IndieWire Critics Poll	December 19, 2016	Best Cinematography	Seamus McGarvey	10th Place	
IndieWire Critics Poll	December 19, 2016	Best Editing	Joan Sobel	10th Place	
Jupiter Awards	March 29, 2017	Best International Actress	Amy Adams	Nominated	
London Film Critics' Circle	January 22, 2017	Film of the Year	Nocturnal Animals	Nominated	
London Film Critics' Circle	January 22, 2017	Actor of the Year	Jake Gyllenhaal	Nominated	
London Film Critics' Circle	January 22, 2017	Supporting Actor of the Year	Michael Shannon	Nominated	
Make-Up Artists and Hair Stylists Guild	February 19, 2017	Feature-Length Motion Picture – Contemporary Make-Up	Donald Mowat, Elaine Offers and Malanie J. Romero	Won	
Make-Up Artists and Hair Stylists Guild	February 19, 2017	Feature-Length Motion Picture – Contemporary Hair Styling	Jules Holdren and Yolanda Toussieng	Nominated	
National Society of Film Critics	January 7, 2017	Best Supporting Actor	Michael Shannon	3rd Place	
Online Film Critics Society	January 3, 2017	Best Supporting Actor	Michael Shannon	Nominated	
Online Film Critics Society	January 3, 2017	Best Adapted Screenplay	Tom Ford	Nominated	
San Diego Film Critics Society	December 12, 2016	Best Film	Nocturnal Animals	Nominated	
San Diego Film Critics Society	December 12, 2016	Best Director	Tom Ford	Nominated	
San Diego Film Critics Society	December 12, 2016	Best Actor	Jake Gyllenhaal	Nominated	
San Diego Film Critics Society	December 12, 2016	Best Supporting Actor	Michael Shannon	Nominated	
San Diego Film Critics Society	December 12, 2016	Best Supporting Actor	Aaron Taylor-Johnson	Nominated	
San Diego Film Critics Society	December 12, 2016	Best Adapted Screenplay	Tom Ford	Nominated	
San Diego Film Critics Society	December 12, 2016	Best Editing	Joan Sobel	Runner-up	
San Diego Film Critics Society	December 12, 2016	Best Cinematography	Seamus McGarvey	Nominated	
San Diego Film Critics Society	December 12, 2016	Best Production Design	Shane Valentino	Nominated	
San Diego Film Critics Society	December 12, 2016	Best Ensemble	The cast of Nocturnal Animals	Nominated	
San Diego Film Critics Society	December 12, 2016	Body of Work	Michael Shannon (also for Midnight Special, Loving and Elvis & Nixon)	Won	
San Francisco Film Critics Circle	December 11, 2016	Best Supporting Actor	Michael Shannon	Nominated	
San Francisco Film Critics Circle	December 11, 2016	Best Adapted Screenplay	Tom Ford	Nominated	
Santa Barbara International Film Festival	February 3, 2017	Virtuosos Award	Aaron Taylor-Johnson	Won	
Satellite Awards	February 19, 2017	Best Film	Nocturnal Animals	Nominated	
Satellite Awards	February 19, 2017	Best Director	Tom Ford	Nominated	
Satellite Awards	February 19, 2017	Best Actress	Amy Adams	Nominated	
Screen Actors Guild Awards	January 29, 2017	Outstanding Performance by a Stunt Ensemble in a Motion Picture	The stunt ensemble of Nocturnal Animals	Nominated	
St. Louis Film Critics Association	December 18, 2016	Best Supporting Actor	Michael Shannon	Nominated	
St. Louis Film Critics Association	December 18, 2016	Best Adapted Screenplay	Tom Ford	Nominated	
St. Louis Film Critics Association	December 18, 2016	Best Editing	Joan Sobel	Nominated	
Toronto Film Critics Association	December 11, 2016	Best Supporting Actor	Michael Shannon	Runner-up	
Venice Film Festival	September 10, 2016	Grand Jury Prize	Tom Ford	Won	
Venice Film Festival	September 10, 2016	Golden Lion	Tom Ford	Nominated	
Washington D.C. Area Film Critics Association	December 5, 2016	Best Supporting Actor	Michael Shannon	Nominated	
Washington D.C. Area Film Critics Association	December 5, 2016	Best Adapted Screenplay	Tom Ford	Nominated	
Washington D.C. Area Film Critics Association	December 5, 2016	Best Cinematography	Seamus McGarvey	Nominated	
Women Film Critics Circle	December 19, 2016	Worst Female Image in a Movie	Nocturnal Animals (the obese naked women dancing)	Nominated	
Women Film Critics Circle	December 19, 2016	Mommie Dearest Worst Screen Mom of the Year Award	Laura Linney	Won	
Writers Guild of America Awards	February 19, 2017	Best Adapted Screenplay	Tom Ford	Nominated	
