= Spencer Averick =

American film editor and producer

- Averick in 2026
- Occupations: Film editor and producer

Spencer Averick is an American film editor and producer. Best known for his work as an editor on critically acclaimed films Middle of Nowhere (2012), Selma (2014) and for producing 2016 acclaimed documentary 13th for which he received Academy Award for Best Documentary Feature nominations at 89th Academy Awards, that he shared with director Ava DuVernay and co-producer Howard Barish. His wife is The Simpsons writer and producer Elisabeth Kiernan Averick.

== Awards and nominations ==
Year	Award	Category	Work	Recipients and nominees	Outcome
2015	Central Ohio Film Critics Association	Best Film Editing	Selma	Spencer Averick	Nominated
2015	Hollywood Post Alliance	Outstanding Editing - Feature Film	Selma	Spencer Averick	Nominated
2016	ACE Eddie Awards	Best Edited Documentary Feature	13th	Spencer Averick	Nominated
2016	Academy Awards	Best Documentary Feature	13th	Spencer Averick; Shared with: Ava DuVernay; Howard Barish	Nominated
2016	Black Reel Awards	Best Film	13th	Spencer Averick; Shared with: Ava DuVernay; Howard Barish	Nominated
2016	Independent Spirit Awards	Independent Spirit Award for Best Documentary Feature	13th	Spencer Averick; Shared with: Ava DuVernay; Howard Barish	Nominated
2016	International Documentary Association	Best Feature Film	13th	Spencer Averick; Shared with: Ava DuVernay; Howard Barish	Nominated
