= 13th (film) =

2016 American documentary film

- Digital release poster
- Directed by: Ava DuVernay
- Written by: Ava DuVernay; Spencer Averick
- Produced by: Ava DuVernay; Howard Barish; Spencer Averick
- Cinematography: Hans Charles; Kira Kelly
- Edited by: Spencer Averick
- Music by: Jason Moran
- Production company: Kandoo Films
- Distributed by: Netflix
- Release dates: September 30, 2016 (NYFF); October 7, 2016 (United States)
- Running time: 100 minutes
- Country: United States
- Language: English
- Budget: $1 million
- Box office: $566 (UK only)

13th is a 2016 American documentary film directed by Ava DuVernay. It explores the prison–industrial complex, and the "intersection of race, justice, and mass incarceration in the United States". The title refers to the Thirteenth Amendment to the United States Constitution, adopted in 1865, which abolished slavery throughout the United States and ended involuntary servitude, except as punishment for convicted criminals. The film argues that this exemption has been used to continue the practice of involuntary servitude in the form of penal labor.

DuVernay contends that slavery in the United States has been perpetuated since the end of the Civil War through criminalizing behavior and enabling police to arrest poor freedmen and force them to work for the state under convict leasing; suppression of African Americans by disenfranchisement, lynchings, and Jim Crow; politicians declaring a war on drugs that weighs more heavily on minority communities; and, by the late 20th century, mass incarceration affecting communities of color, especially American descendants of slavery. In addition to the prison-industrial complex, the film examines the emerging detention-industrial complex, discussing how much money is being made by corporations from such incarcerations.

The film garnered widespread critical acclaim. It was nominated for the Academy Award for Best Documentary Feature at the 89th Academy Awards, and it won the Primetime Emmy Award for Outstanding Documentary or Nonfiction Special at the 69th Primetime Emmy Awards.

== Synopsis ==
The film begins with an audio clip of President Barack Obama stating that the US has 5 percent of the world's population, but 25 percent of the world's prisoners. There follow interviews with a number of activists, academics, political figures from both major U.S. political parties, and public figures, including Angela Davis, Bryan Stevenson, Michelle Alexander, Jelani Cobb, Van Jones, Newt Gingrich, Cory Booker, Marie Gottschalk, and Henry Louis Gates Jr.

The economic history of slavery and the post-Civil War racist legislation and practices that replaced it are explored. Southern states criminalized minor offenses, arresting freedmen and forcing them to work when they could not pay fines, and this approach was institutionalized as convict leasing, which created an incentive to criminalize more behavior. DuVernay contends that most black people were disenfranchised across the South at the turn of the 20th century, being excluded from the political system (including juries) at the same time that lynching of black people by white mobs reached a peak. In addition, Jim Crow legislation was passed by Democrats to legalize segregation and suppress minorities, forcing them into second-class status. Following the passage of civil rights legislation in the 1960s that restored civil rights, the film notes the Republican Party's appeal to southern white conservatives, including the claim to be the party to fight the war on crime and war on drugs, which began to include mandatory, lengthy sentencing. A new wave of minority incarcerations began, reaching African Americans and others in the northern, mid-western, and western cities where many had migrated in earlier decades. After their presidential candidates lost to Republicans, Democratic politicians such as Bill Clinton joined the war on drugs.

As a result, from the early 1970s, the film claims that the rate of incarceration and the number of people in prisons has climbed dramatically in the United States, while at the same time the rate of crime in the United States has continued to decline since the late 20th century. As late as the 2016 presidential election, the eventual winner Donald Trump worked to generate fear of crime, claiming high rates in New York City, for instance, which was not true, according to the film, which states that crime was lower overall than it had been in decade. Private prison contractors entered the market to satisfy demand as arrests and sentences increased, forming an independent group with its own economic incentives to criminalize minor activities and lengthen sentences in order to keep prisons full. Politicians and businessmen in rural areas encouraged construction of prisons to supply local jobs, and they also have had incentives to keep prisons full.

The federal Bureau of Prisons announced in 2016 its intention to stop contracting with private providers for prison services. According to the film, the over-incarceration of adults has severely damaged generations of black and minority families and their children.

The film explores the role of the American Legislative Exchange Council (ALEC), backed by corporations, that has provided Republican state- and federal-legislators with draft legislation to support the prison-industrial complex. It contends that only after some of the relationships were revealed did corporations like Walmart and others receive criticism and drop out of the organization.

The demonization of minority poor to serve political ends is examined, along with how this has contributed to fears of minorities by whites and to problems of police brutality against minority communities. In the 21st century, the regularity of fatal police shootings of unarmed minorities in apparently minor confrontations has been demonstrated by videos taken by bystanders and by the increasing use of cameras in police cars or body-worn cameras by officers. DuVernay ends the film with graphic videos of fatal shootings of black people by police, which Manohla Dargis describes as, following the previous discussion, having the effect of "a piercing, keening cry".

== Production ==
The film was written by Ava DuVernay, the director of Selma (2014), and Spencer Averick, who also edited the film. Produced and filmed in secrecy, the existence of 13th was only revealed when it was announced as the opening film of the 2016 New York Film Festival. It was the first documentary ever to open the festival.

== Release ==
13th was released on Netflix on October 7, 2016. A companion piece, 13th: A Conversation with Oprah Winfrey & Ava DuVernay, was released on the service on January 26, 2017, in the United States, and on January 31 worldwide. On April 17, 2020, Netflix made the film available to stream for free on YouTube.

== Reception and legacy ==
=== Critical response ===
On the film review aggregator website Rotten Tomatoes, 97% of 109 critics' reviews of the film are positive, with an average rating of 8.8/10; the site's "critics consensus" reads: "13th strikes at the heart of America's tangled racial history, offering observations as incendiary as they are calmly controlled." On Metacritic, the film has a weighted average score of 83 out of 100 based on reviews from 29 critics, indicating "universal acclaim".

Manohla Dargis of The New York Times called the film "powerful, infuriating, and at times overwhelming", and praised its meticulous marshaling of facts. Summarizing the film, Dargis wrote that "The United States did not just criminalize a select group of black people. It criminalized black people as a whole, a process that, in addition to destroying untold lives, effectively transferred the guilt for slavery from the people who perpetuated it to the very people who suffered through it." Peter Travers of Rolling Stone awarded the film four stars out of four and named it one of the best films of 2016.

=== Criticism ===
Dan Berger of Black Perspectives wrote that 13th was at its best when chronicling the lives of individuals in the American prison system, but said the film "makes several significant factual errors", such as using outdated statistical data and overstating the role of for-profit prisons. John Anderson of America Magazine had similar criticisms of the film.

=== Viewership ===
On a panel about the future of film published in The New York Times, DuVernay said:

I'm told by the system that [a theatrical release] is what matters, but then people aren't seeing your movies. Take the number of people who saw Selma, a Christmas release with an Oscar campaign about Dr. Martin Luther King. Well, more than a quadruple amount of people saw 13th, about the prison-industrial complex. If I'm telling these stories to reach a mass audience, then really, nothing else matters.

During the George Floyd protests in June 2020, the film experienced a 4,665% surge in viewership on Netflix.

=== Accolades ===
The film was nominated for dozens of awards, including the Academy Award for Best Documentary Feature. It was given a Peabody Award for excellence and won best documentary at the British Academy Film Awards and the Primetime Emmy Awards. DuVernay received a Primetime Emmy Award for her writing, and she was nominated for her directing. The song "Letter to the Free" was nominated for several awards, with Common, Robert Glasper, and Karriem Riggins winning the Primetime Emmy Award for Outstanding Original Music and Lyrics.

Award	Category	Recipients	Result
Academy Awards	Best Documentary Feature	Ava DuVernay, Spencer Averick & Howard Barish	Nominated
ACE Eddie Awards	Best Edited Documentary Feature	Spencer Averick	Nominated
African-American Film Critics Association Awards	Best Documentary	13th	Won
Alliance of Women Film Journalists' EDA Awards	Best Documentary	13th	Won
Alliance of Women Film Journalists' EDA Awards	Best Woman Director	Ava DuVernay	Won
Alliance of Women Film Journalists' EDA Awards	Outstanding Achievement by a Woman in the Film Industry	Ava DuVernay	Won
Austin Film Critics Association Awards	Best Documentary	13th	Nominated
Black Reel Awards	Best Film	13th	Nominated
Black Reel Awards	Best Feature Documentary	13th	Won
Black Reel Awards	Best Original or Adapted Song	"Letter to the Free" – Common	Nominated
British Academy Film Awards	Best Documentary	Ava DuVernay, Spencer Averick & Howard Barish	Won
Cinema Audio Society	Outstanding Achievement in Sound Mixing for a Motion Picture – Documentary	Jeffrey Perkins	Nominated
Critics' Choice Documentary Awards	Best Documentary Feature	13th	Nominated
Critics' Choice Documentary Awards	Best Documentary (TV/Streaming)	13th	Won
Critics' Choice Documentary Awards	Best Director (TV/Streaming)	Ava DuVernay	Won
Critics' Choice Documentary Awards	Best Political Documentary	13th	Won
Critics' Choice Documentary Awards	Best Song in a Documentary	"Letter to the Free"	Nominated
Dallas–Fort Worth Film Critics Association Awards	Best Documentary	13th	Runner-up
Detroit Film Critics Society Awards	Best Documentary	13th	Nominated
Hollywood Music in Media Awards	Best Original Song – Documentary	"Letter to the Free"	Nominated
Houston Film Critics Society Awards	Best Documentary Feature	13th	Nominated
Independent Spirit Awards	Best Documentary Feature	13th	Nominated
MTV Movie & TV Awards	Best Documentary	13th	Won
NAACP Image Awards	Outstanding Documentary (Film)	13th	Won
National Society of Film Critics Awards	Best Non-Fiction Film	13th	3rd Place
New York Film Critics Online Awards	Best Documentary	13th	Won
Online Film Critics Society Awards	Best Documentary Film	13th	Nominated
Peabody Awards	Excellence	Forward Movement LLC and Kandoo Films	Won
Phoenix Film Critics Society Awards	Best Documentary	13th	Nominated
Primetime Emmy Awards	Outstanding Documentary or Nonfiction Special	13th	Won
Primetime Emmy Awards	Outstanding Directing for Nonfiction Programming	Ava DuVernay	Nominated
Primetime Emmy Awards	Outstanding Writing for Nonfiction Programming	Ava DuVernay and Spencer Averick	Won
Primetime Emmy Awards	Outstanding Cinematography for a Nonfiction Program	Hans Charles and Kira Kelly	Nominated
Primetime Emmy Awards	Outstanding Original Music and Lyrics	Common, Robert Glasper and Karriem Riggins for "Letter to the Free"	Won
Primetime Emmy Awards	Outstanding Picture Editing for a Nonfiction Program	Spencer Averick	Nominated
Primetime Emmy Awards	Outstanding Sound Editing for Nonfiction Programming (Single or Multi-Camera)	Tim Boggs, Alex Lee, Julie Pierce and Lise Richardson	Nominated
Primetime Emmy Awards	Outstanding Sound Mixing for a Nonfiction Program (Single or Multi-Camera)	Jeffrey Perkins	Nominated
Satellite Awards	Best Documentary Film	13th	Won
San Francisco Film Critics Circle Awards	Best Documentary Film	13th	Nominated
Vancouver Film Critics Circle Awards	Best Documentary	13th	Nominated
Washington D.C. Area Film Critics Association	Best Documentary	13th	Won
Women Film Critics Circle Awards	Best Movie by a Woman	13th	Won
Women Film Critics Circle Awards	Best Woman Storyteller (Screenwriting Award)	Ava DuVernay	Won
Women Film Critics Circle Awards	Best Documentary By or About Women	13th	Won
Women Film Critics Circle Awards	Courage in Filmmaking	Ava DuVernay	Won

== See also ==
- Penal labor exception
  - Penal exception clause
- The House I Live In – a 2012 documentary film
- Slavery in the United States
