= Howard Barish =

American film producer

Howard Barish is president and CEO of Kandoo Films, an Oscar nominated, Emmy award-winning entertainment company known for its producing partnership with Ava DuVernay. Barish and Kandoo's most recognized project to date, 13th, is a 2016 American documentary from Netflix directed by DuVernay. Centered on race in the United States criminal justice system, the critically lauded film is titled after the Thirteenth Amendment to the United States Constitution, which outlawed slavery (unless as punishment for a crime). It argues that slavery is being effectively perpetuated through mass incarceration.

Produced by DuVernay, Spencer Averick and Barish, 13th was nominated for an Academy Award for Best Documentary Feature at the 89th Oscars. Winner of four Academy of Television Arts and Sciences (Emmy) awards, a BAFTA award, an NAACP Image Award and an African-American Film Critics Association (AAFCA) award for best documentary, it also won best documentary and best director in the TV/Streaming categories, as well as best political documentary at the first annual Critics' Choice Documentary Awards.

Originally from Toronto, Canada, Barish gained extensive production experience in the thriving Canadian film and television industry as a First Assistant Director on feature films, television mini-series, made-for-television movies, pilots and nearly 100 episodes of various network television series. After relocating to Los Angeles in 1991, he launched Kandoo Films, Inc., a production and film distribution company that specializes in creating entertainment content for theatrical, television, digital, and multi-media platforms. As founder of Kandoo, Barish has been responsible for producing image and branding campaigns for NBC, CBS, FOX, and The CW Television Networks, as well as promos, sizzle reels, and thousands of hours of short-form content and long-form programming for numerous companies.

Barish first began collaborating with DuVernay on the films Middle of Nowhere and I Will Follow, with Middle winning the Best Director Prize at the 2012 Sundance Film Festival, a Gotham Award and the 2013 Independent Spirit John Cassavetes Award.

Barish has also served as a producer for an ESPN 30 for 30 film showcasing tennis great Venus Williams, Hello Beautiful: Interludes with John Legend, and Fox's history-making webisode series, 24INSIDE. Barish's executive producer credits include E! Entertainment’s reality series The Entertainer; the documentary film Glitter Girls, and feature films Fizzy Business and Still Punching the Clown.
