= African-American Film Critics Association Awards 2016 =

Annual US film awards ceremony

14th African-American Film Critics Association Awards
- Date: February 8, 2017

Highlights
- Best Picture: Moonlight
- Independent film: Moonlight
- Animation: Zootopia
- Documentary: 13th
- Best Comedy Series: Atlanta
- Best Drama Series: Queen Sugar

The 2016 African-American Film Critics Association Awards were announced on December 13, 2016, while the ceremony took place on February 8, 2017, at Taglyan Complex, in Hollywood, California.

== Awards ==
Below is the list of complete winners.

=== AAFCA Top Ten Films ===
1. Moonlight (A24)
2. Fences (Paramount Pictures)
3. Hidden Figures (20th Century Fox)
4. Lion (The Weinstein Company)
5. La La Land (Lionsgate)
6. The Birth of a Nation (Fox Searchlight)
7. Loving (Focus Features)
8. Manchester by the Sea (Roadside Attractions/Amazon Studios)
9. Hell or High Water (Lionsgate/CBS Films)
10. Queen of Katwe (Walt Disney Pictures/CBS Films)

=== AAFCA Top Ten TV Shows ===
1. Queen Sugar (OWN)
2. Underground (WGN)
3. Atlanta (FX)
4. Insecure (HBO)
5. Luke Cage (Netflix)
6. This Is Us (NBC)
7. Black-ish (ABC)
8. The Get Down (Netflix)
9. Westworld (HBO)
10. Survivor's Remorse (Starz)

=== AAFCA Regular Awards ===
Best Picture

- Moonlight

Best Director

- Barry Jenkins – Moonlight

Best Actor

- Denzel Washington – Fences

Best Actress

- Ruth Negga – Loving

Best Supporting Actor

- Mahershala Ali – Moonlight

Best Supporting Actress

- Viola Davis – Fences

Best Ensemble

- Hidden Figures

Best Independent Film

- Moonlight

Best Screenplay

- August Wilson – Fences

Breakout Performance

- Janelle Monáe – Moonlight and Hidden Figures

Best Animation

- Zootopia

Best Documentary

- 13th

Best Song

- "Victory" – Hidden Figures

Best TV Comedy

- Atlanta

Best TV Drama

- Queen Sugar

Best Cable/New Media TV Show

- Underground

Best Limited Series/Special

- Lemonade

=== AAFCA Special Awards ===
AAFCA Special Achievement Award

- Anthony Hemingway, director; Lee Daniels, producer/director; Floyd Norman, animator

Roger Ebert Award

- Michael Phillips, film critic

Ashley Boone Award

- Vanessa Morrison, 20th Century Fox Animation president

== See also ==
- 2016 in film
