= Dallas–Fort Worth Film Critics Association Awards 2016 =

Annual US film awards ceremony

22nd Dallas–Fort Worth Film Critics Association Awards
- Date: December 13, 2016
- Location: Dallas, Texas
- Country: United States
- Presented by: Dallas–Fort Worth Film Critics Association
- Website: dfwcritics.com

The 22nd Dallas–Fort Worth Film Critics Association Awards honoring the best in film for 2016 were announced on December 13, 2016. These awards "recognizing extraordinary accomplishment in film" are presented annually by the Dallas–Fort Worth Film Critics Association (DFWFCA), based in the Dallas–Fort Worth metroplex region of Texas. The organization, founded in 1990, includes 30 film critics for print, radio, television, and internet publications based in north Texas. The Dallas–Fort Worth Film Critics Association began presenting its annual awards list in 1993.

Moonlight was the DFWFCA's most awarded film of 2016, taking four top honors: Best Picture, Best Director (Barry Jenkins), Best Supporting Actor (Mahershala Ali), and the Russell Smith Award. La La Land and Manchester by the Sea both won two awards. Manchester by the Sea won Best Actor (Casey Affleck) and Best Screenplay (Kenneth Lonergan), while La La Land won Best Cinematography (Linus Sandgren) and Best Musical Score (Justin Hurwitz).

== Winners ==
Winners are listed first and highlighted with boldface. Other films ranked by the annual poll are listed in order. While most categories saw 5 honorees named, categories ranged from as many as 10 (Best Film) to as few as 2 (Best Cinematography, Best Screenplay, and Best Musical Score).

=== Category awards ===
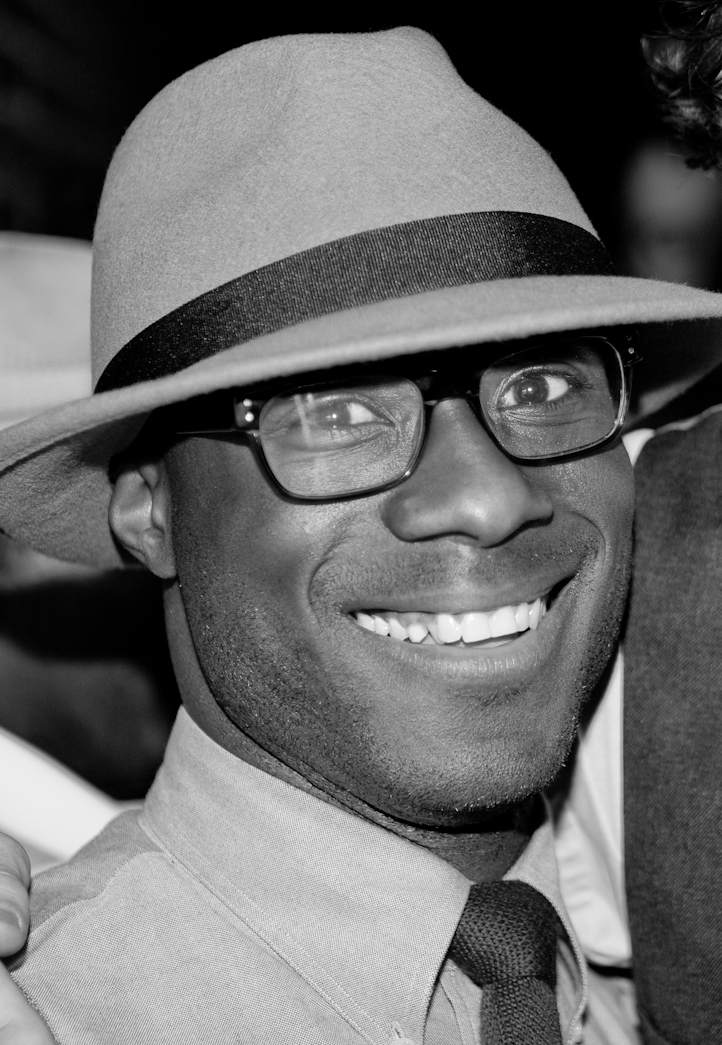
Barry Jenkins, Best Director winner

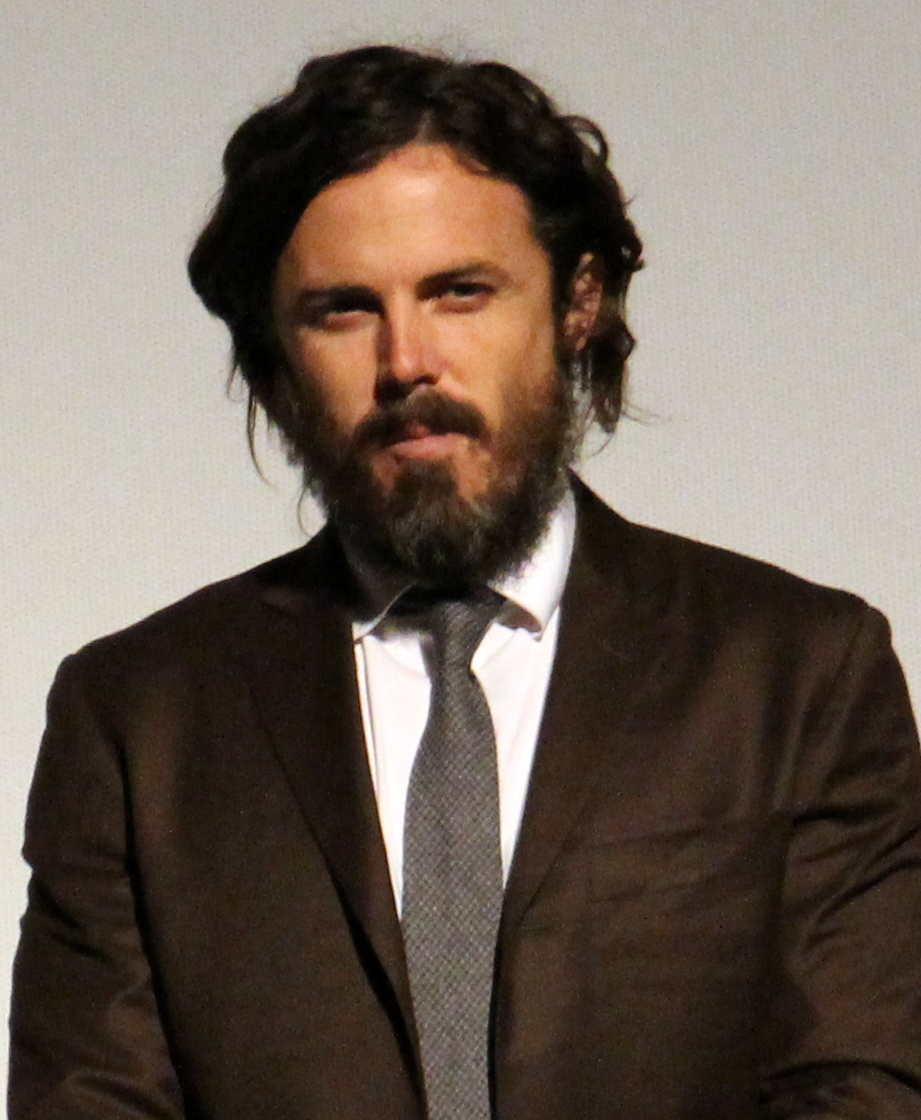
Casey Affleck, Best Actor winner

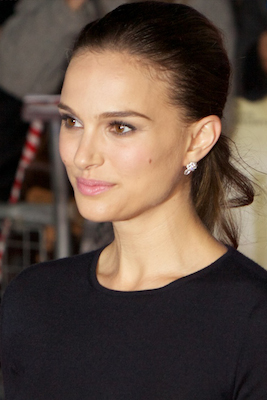
Natalie Portman, Best Actress winner

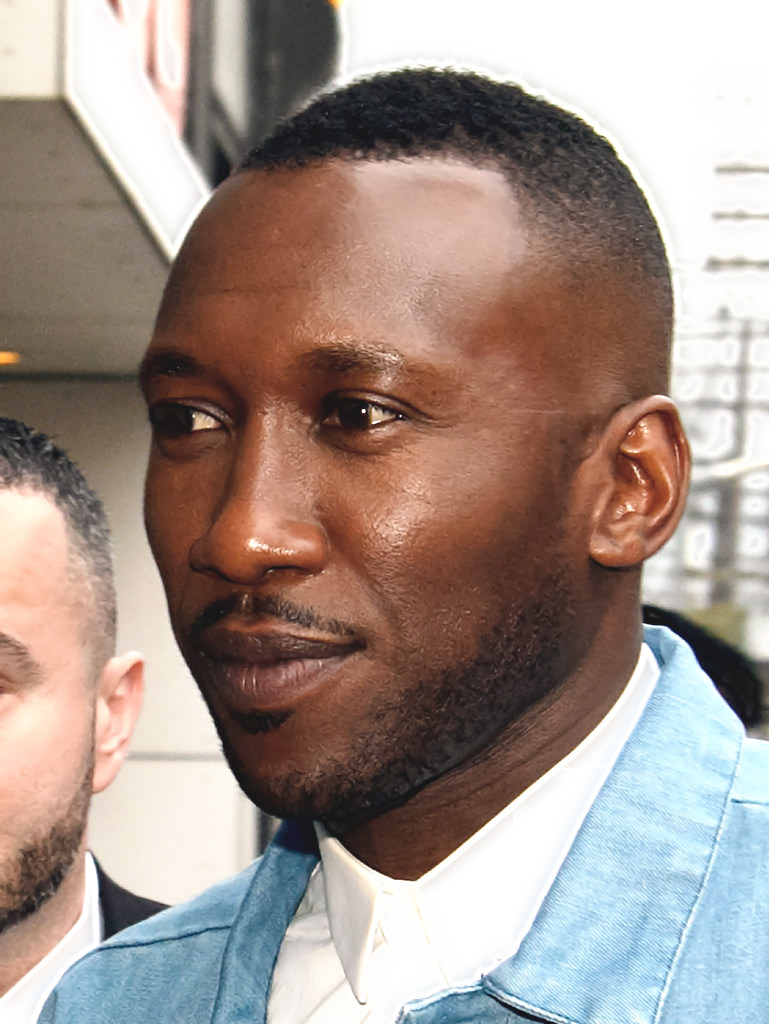
Mahershala Ali, Best Supporting Actor winner

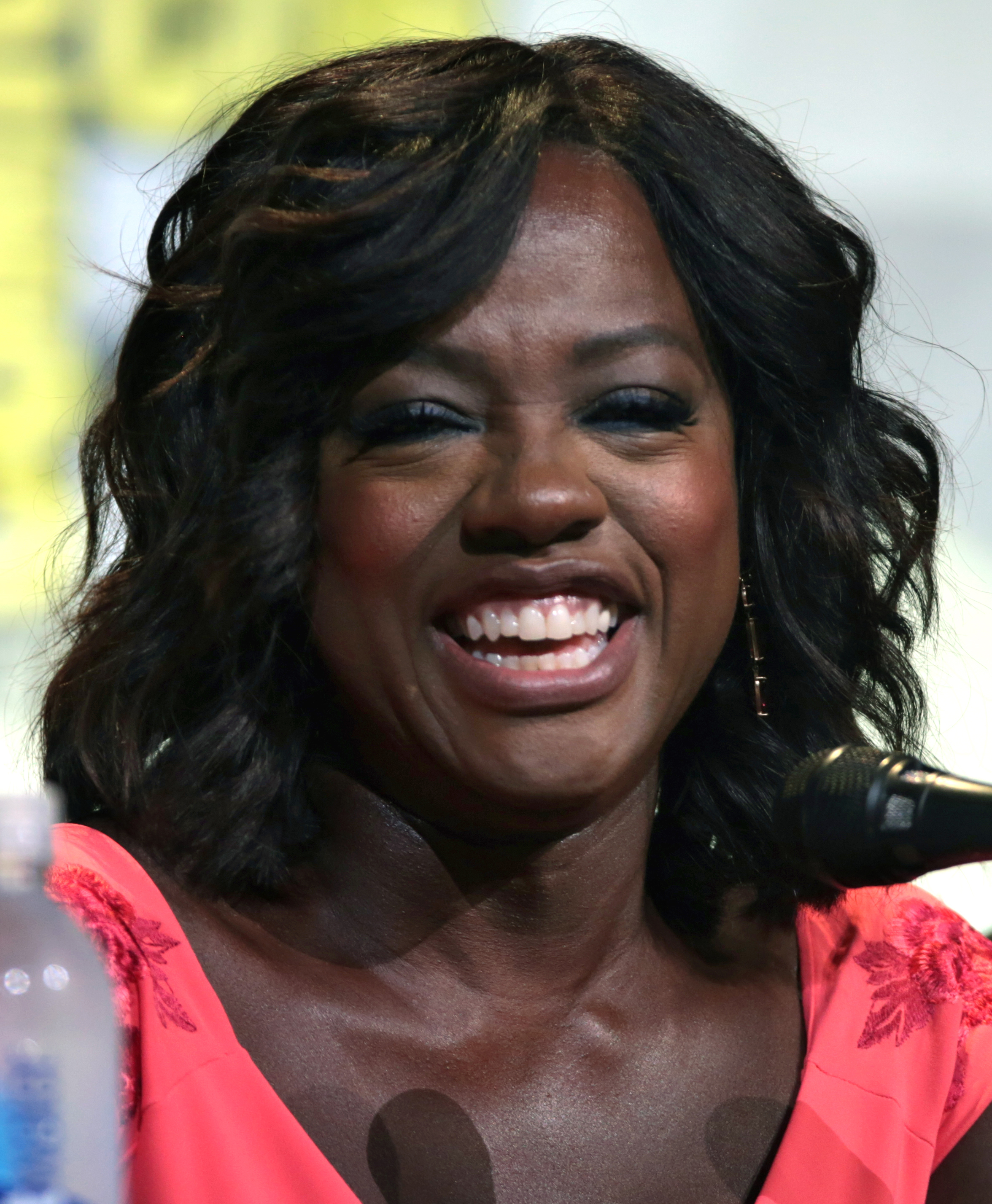
Viola Davis, Best Supporting Actress winner

| Best Picture | Best Foreign Language Film |
|---|---|
| 1. **Moonlight**; 2. Manchester by the Sea; 3. La La Land; 4. Hell or High Water; 5. Arrival; 6. Jackie; 7. Loving; 8. 20th Century Women; 9. Hacksaw Ridge; 10. Silence | 1. **The Handmaiden** • South Korea; 2. Toni Erdmann • Germany; 3. Elle • France; 4. Neruda • Chile; 5. The Salesman • Iran |
| Best Actor | Best Actress |
| 1. **Casey Affleck** - Manchester by the Sea as Lee Chandler; 2. Denzel Washington - Fences as Troy Maxson; 3. Joel Edgerton - Loving as Richard Loving; 4. Ryan Gosling - La La Land as Sebastian Wilder; 5. Tom Hanks - Sully as Chesley "Sully" Sullenberger | 1. **Natalie Portman** - Jackie as Jacqueline Kennedy Onassis; 2. Emma Stone - La La Land as Mia Dolan; 3. Ruth Negga - Loving as Mildred Loving; 4. Amy Adams - Arrival as Dr. Louise Banks; 5. Annette Bening - 20th Century Women as Dorothea Fields |
| Best Supporting Actor | Best Supporting Actress |
| 1. **Mahershala Ali** - Moonlight as Juan; 2. Jeff Bridges - Hell or High Water as Marcus Hamilton; 3. Michael Shannon - Nocturnal Animals as Detective Bobby Andes; 4. Lucas Hedges - Manchester by the Sea as Patrick Chandler; 5. Ben Foster - Hell or High Water as Tanner Howard | 1. **Viola Davis** - Fences as Rose Maxson; 2. Naomie Harris - Moonlight as Paula; 3. Michelle Williams - Manchester by the Sea as Randi Chandler; 4. Greta Gerwig - 20th Century Women as Abigail "Abbie" Porter; 5. Judy Davis - The Dressmaker as Molly Dunnage |
| Best Director | Best Documentary Film |
| 1. **Barry Jenkins** - Moonlight; 2. Damien Chazelle - La La Land; 3. Kenneth Lonergan - Manchester by the Sea; 4. David Mackenzie - Hell or High Water; 5. Denis Villeneuve - Arrival | 1. **Tower**; 2. 13th 3. Gleason; 4. I Am Not Your Negro; 5. Weiner |
| Best Animated Film | Best Cinematography |
| 1. **Zootopia**; 2. Kubo and the Two Strings; 3. Moana | 1. **Linus Sandgren** - La La Land; 2. Rodrigo Prieto - Silence |
| Best Screenplay | Best Musical Score |
| 1. **Kenneth Lonergan** - Manchester by the Sea; 2. Barry Jenkins - Moonlight | 1. **Justin Hurwitz** - La La Land; 2. Mica Levi - Jackie |

=== Individual awards ===
==== Russell Smith Award ====
- Moonlight, for "best low-budget or cutting-edge independent film"
