= Austin Film Critics Association Awards 2016 =

Annual US film awards ceremony

12th AFCA Awards

Best Film:
Moonlight

The 12th Austin Film Critics Association Awards, honoring the best in filmmaking for 2016, were announced on December 28, 2016.

== Winners and nominees ==
Best Film	Best Director
1. Moonlight; 2. La La Land; 3. Arrival; 4. The Handmaiden; 5. Manchester by the Sea; 6. Elle; 7. Hell or High Water; 8. The Lobster; 9. Jackie; 10. Sing Street	Barry Jenkins – Moonlight; Park Chan-wook – The Handmaiden; Damien Chazelle – La La Land; Kenneth Lonergan – Manchester by the Sea; Denis Villeneuve – Arrival
Best Actor	Best Actress
Casey Affleck – Manchester by the Sea; Joel Edgerton – Loving; Colin Farrell – The Lobster; Ryan Gosling – La La Land; Denzel Washington – Fences	Isabelle Huppert – Elle; Amy Adams – Arrival; Annette Bening – 20th Century Women; Ruth Negga – Loving; Natalie Portman – Jackie
Best Supporting Actor	Best Supporting Actress
Mahershala Ali – Moonlight; Jeff Bridges – Hell or High Water; Ben Foster – Hell or High Water; Trevante Rhodes – Moonlight; Michael Shannon – Nocturnal Animals	Viola Davis – Fences; Greta Gerwig – 20th Century Women; Naomie Harris – Moonlight; Min-hee Kim – The Handmaiden; Michelle Williams – Manchester by the Sea
Best Original Screenplay	Best Adapted Screenplay
Moonlight – Barry Jenkins; 20th Century Women – Mike Mills; La La Land – Damien Chazelle; The Lobster – Yorgos Lanthimos and Efthimis Filippou; Manchester by the Sea – Kenneth Lonergan	Arrival – Eric Heisserer; The Handmaiden – Park Chan-wook and Jeong Seo-kyeong; Lion – Luke Davies; Love & Friendship – Whit Stillman; Nocturnal Animals – Tom Ford
Best Animated Film	Best Foreign Language Film
Kubo and the Two Strings; The Little Prince; Moana; Tower; Zootopia	The Handmaiden; The Brand New Testament; Elle; Things to Come; Toni Erdmann
Best First Film	Best Documentary
The Witch; The Birth of a Nation; The Edge of Seventeen; Krisha; Swiss Army Man	Tower; 13th; I Am Not Your Negro; O.J.: Made in America; Weiner
Best Cinematography	Best Score
La La Land – Linus Sandgren; Arrival – Bradford Young; The Handmaiden – Chung Chung-hoon; Jackie – Stéphane Fontaine; Moonlight – James Laxton	La La Land – Justin Hurwitz; Arrival – Jóhann Jóhannsson; Hell or High Water – Nick Cave and Warren Ellis; Jackie – Mica Levi; The Neon Demon – Cliff Martinez
Bobby McCurdy Memorial Breakthrough Artist Award	Austin Film Award
Keith Maitland – Tower; Barry Jenkins – Moonlight; Sasha Lane – American Honey; Trevante Rhodes – Moonlight; Anya Taylor-Joy – The Witch	Tower – Keith Maitland; Loving – Jeff Nichols; Midnight Special – Jeff Nichols; Slash – Clay Liford; Transpecos – Greg Kwedar
Special Honorary Award
Ensemble cast of Moonlight and casting director Yesi Ramirez for excellence as an ensemble.; Anton Yelchin for his contribution to the cinema of 2016, including performances in Green Room and Star Trek Beyond. His was a brilliant career cut profoundly short.; A24 for excellence in production in distribution. Their work gave us Moonlight, Green Room, Swiss Army Man, The Lobster, The Witch, and 20th Century Women, among others.; Keith Maitland and his film Tower for revisiting a tragic event in Austin, Texas history in a sensitive and unique manner.
