= Iona (film) =

- Directed by: Scott Graham
- Written by: Scott Graham
- Starring: Ruth Negga; Douglas Henshall
- Music by: Douglas MacDougall
- Release date: 2015
- Running time: 85 minutes
- Country: United Kingdom
- Language: English

Iona is a 2015 drama film written and directed by Scott Graham. Ruth Negga stars as the titular character who escapes with her teenage son into the island where she was named after to hide from a violent crime, where she reunites with her estranged adoptive family.

The film earned Ruth Negga a nomination for Best Actress at the 2016 British Academy Scotland Awards.

== Plot ==
Iona, a young mother, and her 15 year-old son Billy, nicknamed "Bull," flee Glasgow after Bull kills Iona's abusive partner, whom Bull was raised to believe was his father. Iona decides to flee with Bull to the island of Iona, where she was born and raised and named after to hide. Upon arriving at the island, the two burn her partner's body inside their car, but Bull struggles with guilt for killing his father.

Iona and Bull arrive unannounced at the home of her former adoptive father, Daniel. After she had been abandoned by her parents, Daniel and his wife Helen took in Iona and raised her alongside their daughter Elisabeth. However, Daniel began an affair with the teenaged Iona and she fell pregnant with Bull. After Daniel's family discovered their affair and Iona's pregnancy, she abandoned them and raised him in Glasgow, hiding from Bull who his true father was. Daniel informs Iona that Helen had died ten years prior before allowing Iona and Bull to stay at his house.

The island's traditional Celtic Christian community welcomes back Iona, however she awkwardly reunites with Elisabeth, who has married her childhood sweetheart Matthew and together they have a 14 year-old daughter Sarah, who is a paraplegic. As Iona and Bull adjust to working at the community, Matthew decides to take Bull under his wing, while Sarah begins flirting with Bull. Daniel and Iona rekindle their affair. After church, Iona shares to Bull that her mother had moved to the island with her boyfriend to overcome her addictions, before her boyfriend left the two, leaving her mother to raise her on the island. Bull expresses his curiosity in the community's faith, which causes Iona to chastise him.

Bull prays with Matthew and reveals that he killed his "father," hoping that he can receive forgiveness. Before the stunned Matthew can answer, Iona arrives to report that Daniel had collapsed from a seizure, which later proves fatal. The grief-stricken Elisabeth stays with her father's body. Iona confronts Matthew if Bull said anything to him, but Matthew evades her question and instead tells her to talk with Elisabeth.

Sarah suggestively points Bull to her family's barn where they have sex atop a haystack, however he unceremoniously departs and leaves her there. Sarah struggles to get herself down, however she temporarily manages to stand before collapsing, which amazes her.

Iona returns to Daniel's house where she finally talks honestly with Elisabeth, who confronts her about her sexual relationship with her father and for hiding Bull's true paternity from him. She begs Iona not to leave again, as she had not gotten over being abandoned by her years ago. The two begin rekindling their sisterly bond, but it is broken up by policemen from the mainland that Matthew had called in. Iona escapes to find Bull.

The policemen find Bull and give chase. The guilt-ridden Bull ignores his mother's calls and jumps off the cliff to his death. Iona discovers her son's body and tearfully cradles him on the beach.

== Cast ==
- Ruth Negga as Iona
- Douglas Henshall as Daniel
- Tom Brooke as Matthew
- Michelle Duncan as Elisabeth
- Ben Gallagher as Bull / Billy
- Sorcha Groundsell as Sarah

== Reception ==
On review aggregator Rotten Tomatoes, the film holds an approval rating of 63%, based on 16 reviews with an average rating of 5.64/10.
