= London Film Critics Circle Awards 2016 =

British film awards ceremony

37th London Film Critics Circle Awards

22 January 2017

Film of the Year:
La La Land

British Film of the Year:
I, Daniel Blake

The 37th London Film Critics' Circle Awards, honouring the best in film for 2016, were announced by the London Film Critics' Circle on 22 January 2017.

== Winners and nominees ==
=== Film of the Year ===
La La Land

- American Honey
- Fire at Sea
- I, Daniel Blake
- Love & Friendship
- Manchester by the Sea
- Moonlight
- Nocturnal Animals
- Son of Saul
- Toni Erdmann

=== Foreign Language Film of the Year ===
Toni Erdmann

- Fire at Sea
- Son of Saul
- Things to Come
- Victoria

=== British/Irish Film of the Year ===
I, Daniel Blake

- American Honey
- High-Rise
- Love & Friendship
- Sing Street

=== Documentary of the Year ===
Fire at Sea

- The Beatles: Eight Days a Week – The Touring Years
- Cameraperson
- The Eagle Huntress
- Life, Animated

=== Actor of the Year ===
Casey Affleck – Manchester by the Sea

- Adam Driver – Paterson
- Andrew Garfield – Hacksaw Ridge
- Jake Gyllenhaal – Nocturnal Animals
- Peter Simonischek – Toni Erdmann

=== Actress of the Year ===
Isabelle Huppert – Things to Come

- Amy Adams – Arrival
- Kate Beckinsale – Love & Friendship
- Sandra Hüller – Toni Erdmann
- Emma Stone – La La Land

=== Supporting Actor of the Year ===
Mahershala Ali – Moonlight
Tom Bennett – Love & Friendship

- Jeff Bridges – Hell or High Water
- Shia LaBeouf – American Honey
- Michael Shannon – Nocturnal Animals

=== Supporting Actress of the Year ===
Naomie Harris – Moonlight

- Viola Davis – Fences
- Greta Gerwig – 20th Century Women
- Riley Keough – American Honey
- Michelle Williams – Manchester by the Sea

=== British/Irish Actor of the Year ===
Andrew Garfield – Hacksaw Ridge and Silence

- Tom Bennett – Love & Friendship and David Brent: Life on the Road
- Hugh Grant – Florence Foster Jenkins
- Dave Johns – I, Daniel Blake
- David Oyelowo – A United Kingdom and Queen of Katwe

=== British/Irish Actress of the Year ===
Kate Beckinsale – Love & Friendship

- Rebecca Hall – Christine
- Naomie Harris – Moonlight, Our Kind of Traitor, and Collateral Beauty
- Ruth Negga – Loving and Iona
- Hayley Squires – I, Daniel Blake

=== Young British/Irish Performer of the Year ===
Lewis MacDougall – A Monster Calls

- Ruby Barnhill – The BFG
- Sennia Nanua – The Girl with All the Gifts
- Anya Taylor-Joy – The Witch, Morgan, and Split
- Ferdia Walsh-Peelo – Sing Street

=== Director of the Year ===
László Nemes – Son of Saul

- Maren Ade – Toni Erdmann
- Damien Chazelle – La La Land
- Barry Jenkins – Moonlight
- Kenneth Lonergan – Manchester by the Sea

=== Screenwriter of the Year ===
Kenneth Lonergan – Manchester by the Sea

- Maren Ade – Toni Erdmann
- Damien Chazelle – La La Land
- Barry Jenkins – Moonlight
- Whit Stillman – Love & Friendship

=== Breakthrough British/Irish Filmmaker ===
Babak Anvari – Under the Shadow

- Mike Carey – The Girl with All the Gifts
- Guy Hibbert – Eye in the Sky and A United Kingdom
- Peter Middleton and James Spinney – Notes on Blindness
- Rachel Tunnard – Adult Life Skills

=== British/Irish Short Film ===
Brady Hood – Sweet Maddie Stone

- Duncan Cowles and Ross Hogg –Isabella
- Rene Pannevis – Jacked
- Sofia Safanova – Tamara
- Natasha Waugh – Terminal

=== Technical Achievement ===
Victoria – Sturla Brandth Grøvlen, cinematography

- American Honey – Robbie Ryan, cinematography
- Arrival – Sylvain Bellemare, sound design
- High-Rise – Mark Tildesley, production design
- Jackie – Mica Levi, music
- Jason Bourne – Gary Powell, stunt coordination
- La La Land – Justin Hurwitz, music
- Moonlight – Nat Sanders and Joi McMillon, editing
- Rogue One: A Star Wars Story – Neal Scanlan, visual effects
- Sing Street – Gary Clark and John Carney, music

=== Dilys Powell Award ===
- Isabelle Huppert
