= Ruth Negga =

Irish actress (born 1982)

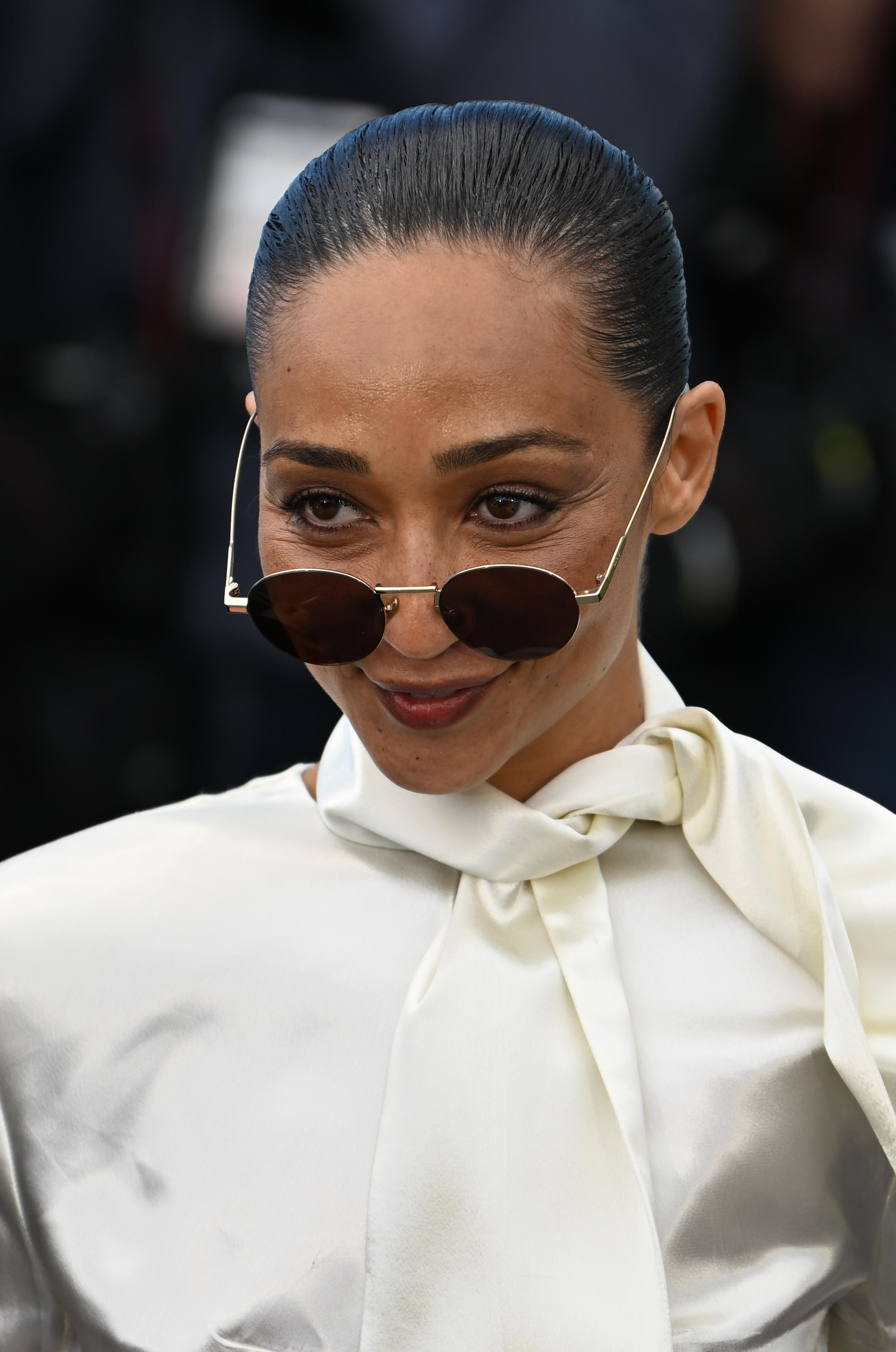
- Negga in 2026
- Born: 4 May 1982 (age 44); Addis Ababa, Ethiopia
- Citizenship: Ethiopia; Ireland
- Education: Trinity College Dublin
- Occupation: Actress
- Years active: 2003–present

Ruth Negga (/ˈneɪɡə/ NAY-gə; born 4 May 1982) is an Irish actress known for her roles on stage and screen. She has received various accolades including nominations for an Academy Award, a Tony Award, two Emmy Awards, three BAFTA Awards, two Golden Globe Awards and a Laurence Olivier Award. She gained international recognition for her portrayal of Mildred Loving in the Jeff Nichols directed historical romance drama Loving (2016), earning a nomination for the Academy Award for Best Actress and the BAFTA Rising Star Award.

She played an African-American woman passing as a white woman in the Rebecca Hall-directed period drama Passing (2021), earning nominations for the BAFTA Award for Best Actress in a Supporting Role and Golden Globe Award for Best Supporting Actress – Motion Picture. Negga has also appeared in the films Isolation (2005), Breakfast on Pluto (2005), Warcraft (2016), Ad Astra (2019) and Good Grief (2023).

On television, Negga became known for her role in the AMC television series Preacher (2016–2019). She also acted in the BBC mini-series Criminal Justice (2008–2019), the RTÉ crime drama Love/Hate (2010–2011), the E4 science fiction comedy series Misfits (2010), and the ABC superhero series Agents of S.H.I.E.L.D. (2013–2015). She played an emotionally unsatisfied wife in the Apple TV+ legal thriller series Presumed Innocent (2024) earning a nomination for the Primetime Emmy Award for Outstanding Supporting Actress in a Limited Series or Movie.

On stage, she was nominated for the Laurence Olivier Award for Best Newcomer in a Play for Duck (2003). She played the title role in the revival of Hamlet both in London and in New York. She made her Broadway debut playing Lady Macbeth in Macbeth (2022), for which she earned a nomination for the Tony Award for Best Actress in a Play.

== Early life and education ==
Negga was born on 4 May 1982 in Addis Ababa, Ethiopia, to an Irish mother, Nora, and an Ethiopian father. Her parents met while working at a hospital in Ethiopia; her mother was a nurse and her father was a doctor. Negga, an only child, lived in the country until she was four. After her father died in a car accident when she was seven, her mother returned to Ireland with her. Negga grew up in Limerick. She moved to London, England, for secondary school.

Negga studied at the Samuel Beckett Centre at Trinity College Dublin, graduating with a BA in Acting Studies.

== Career ==
=== 2004–2012: Early roles ===
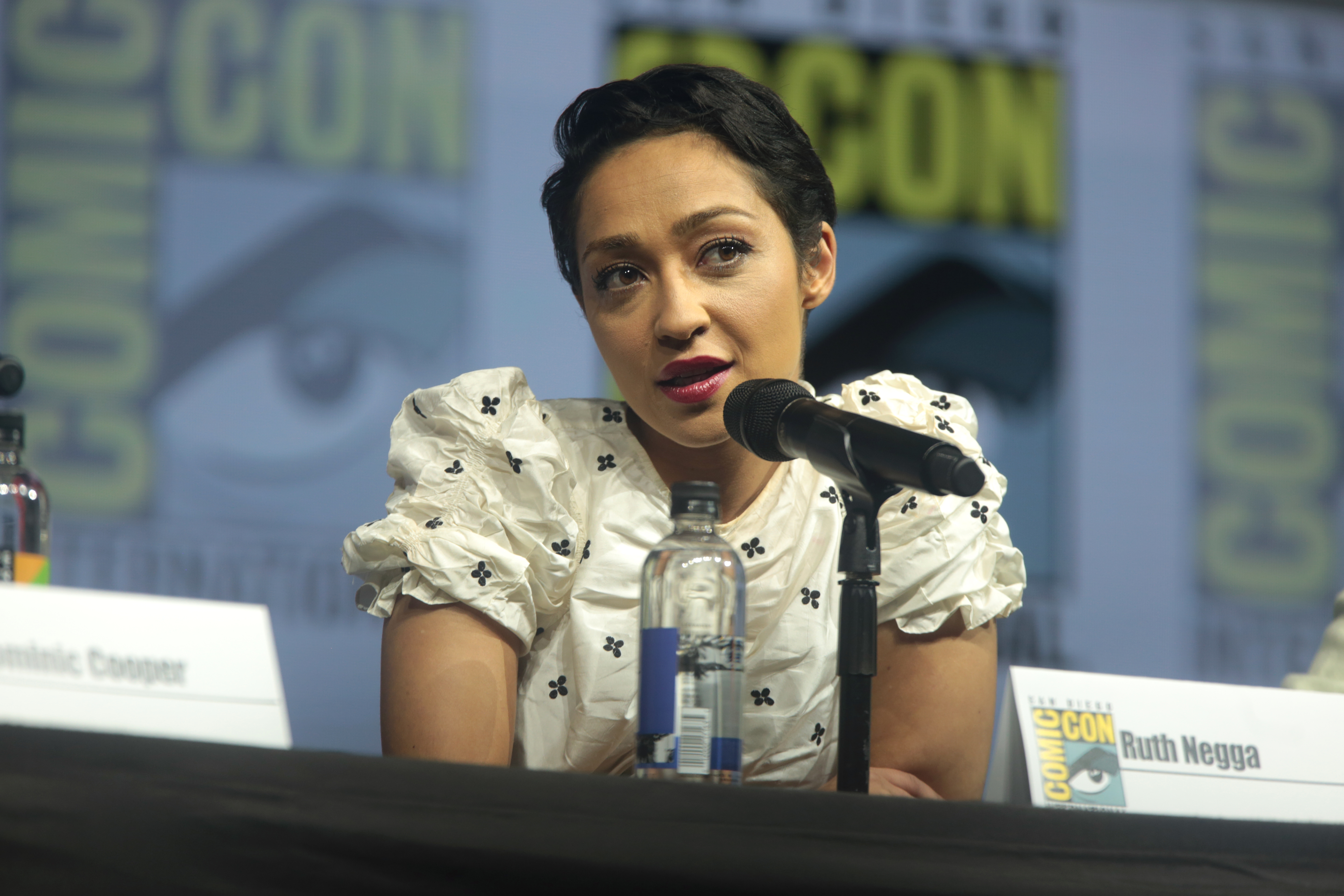
Negga at San Diego Comic-Con for the AMC show Preacher in 2018

Negga made her screen debut in the Irish film Capital Letters (2004), playing the lead role of Taiwo. She went on to play the lead role of Mary in Isolation the following year. Prior to this, she had been working mostly in theatre. After seeing Negga act, director Neil Jordan changed the script to Breakfast on Pluto so that she could appear in the movie. She has also starred in Colour Me Kubrick (2005), with John Malkovich, and the short films The Four Horsemen, 3-Minute 4-Play and Stars.

On television, Negga has appeared in Doctors, Criminal Justice and the Irish series Love Is the Drug. She played the lead role of Doris "Sid" Siddiqi in the BBC Three series Personal Affairs, alongside Laura Aikman, Annabel Scholey and Maimie McCoy. Negga portrayed Rosie in the first two series of RTÉ's Love/Hate. Negga appeared as Dame Shirley Bassey in the BBC production Shirley in 2011 and won the IFTA Award for Best Actress (Television) for her performance. Her theatre work includes roles in Duck, Titus Andronicus and Lay Me Down Softly. As of 2007, she began working with the Irish theatrical group Pan Pan Theatre. In 2010, she played Ophelia in the National Theatre's production of Hamlet. She also provided voice acting in the video game Dark Souls II, playing Shanalotte, otherwise known as "the Emerald Herald".

=== 2013–2019: Career expansion ===
From October 2013, Negga had recurring role as Raina on the American TV series Agents of S.H.I.E.L.D., appearing in 17 episodes of the programme. She filmed scenes for Steve McQueen's Oscar-winning biographical drama 12 Years a Slave (2013), but her role was ultimately cut from the movie. In March 2015, Negga was cast in the role of Tulip O'Hare in AMC fantasy drama series Preacher, which debuted the following year.

In 2016, Negga portrayed Mildred Loving in the Jeff Nichols historical romance Loving, which premiered at the 2016 Cannes Film Festival and later screened at the Toronto International Film Festival. The film is based on the true story of the Lovings, a married interracial couple in the 1950s and 1960s Virginia, whose relationship led to the Supreme Court decision Loving v. Virginia. Negga received rave reviews for the role, and garnered multiple award nominations, including for the Academy Award for Best Actress, the Golden Globe Award for Best Actress in a Motion Picture – Drama, and BAFTA Rising Star Award.

Negga played Prince Hamlet in the Gate Theatre's 2018 production of Hamlet, directed by Yaël Farber. Having a woman play the role of Prince Hamlet although depicted as a man in the play is a precedent established in Dublin by Fanny Furnival in 1741. Negga reprised the role of Hamlet to equal acclaim at St. Ann's Warehouse in spring 2020. In February 2021, it was announced that Negga will star in and executive produce a limited drama series about legendary Jazz age performer and civil rights activist Josephine Baker.

=== 2021–present ===
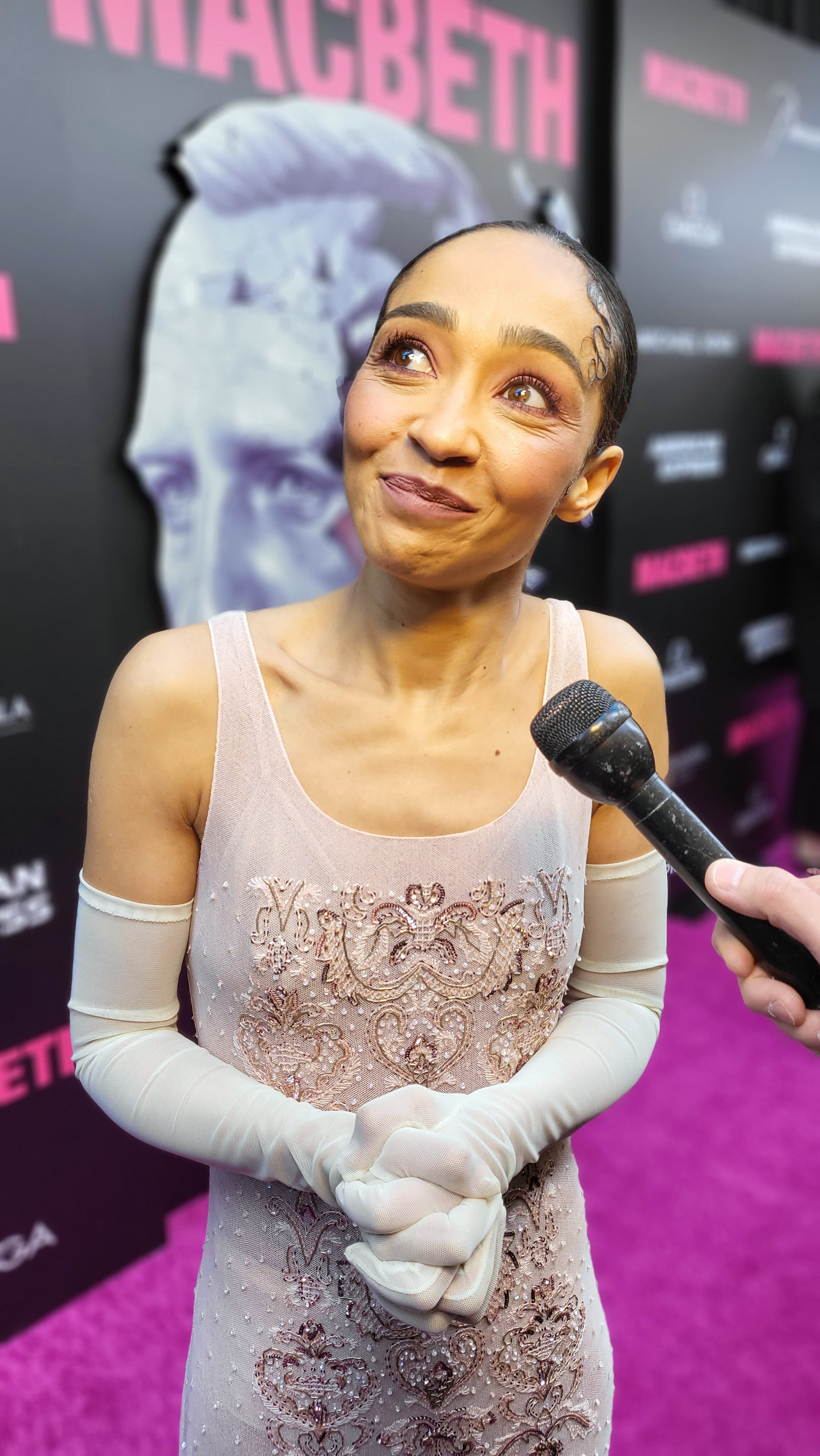
Negga in 2022

In 2021, Negga starred in Rebecca Hall's period drama Passing opposite Tessa Thompson. The film is adapted from Nella Larsen's 1929 novel of the same name. The film premiered at the 2021 Sundance Film Festival and was shown at the New York Film Festival in the fall. Negga portrays Clare, a light-skinned Black woman in 1920s New York, navigating the color line by passing as a white woman. Variety praised Negga's performance writing, "Negga, brittle and dazzling, commands attention exactly the way Clare does in every room she walks into." For her performance, Negga was nominated for the Golden Globe Award, BAFTA and Screen Actors Guild Award in the category of Best Supporting Actress.

In 2022, Negga made her Broadway debut in a production of William Shakespeare's Macbeth as Lady Macbeth, alongside Daniel Craig as the titular character. For her performance in the play, she received a nomination for the Tony Award for Best Performance by a Leading Actress in a Play.

In 2023, Negga starred in Dan Levy's feature directorial debut Good Grief.

In 2024, Negga starred in the American legal thriller anthology television series Presumed Innocent with Jake Gyllenhaal, earning a nomination for the Primetime Emmy Award for Outstanding Supporting Actress in a Limited Series or Movie and a nomination for an Irish Film & Television Academy award. That year she also starred in the premiere of the play Quiet Songs by Finn Beames at the Barbican's Pit Theatre.

In September 2025, a portrait painting of Negga by Dublin-based artist David Booth was unveiled at the National Gallery of Ireland.

== In the media ==
In 2020, Negga was ranked number 10 on The Irish Times list of Ireland's greatest film actors. In 2006 she was also chosen as the Irish Shooting Star for the Berlin Film Festival.

== Personal life ==
In 2006, Negga was engaged to actor Tadhg Murphy, whom she had been dating since university.

Negga was in a relationship with actor Dominic Cooper beginning in 2010. They met in 2009 while working together in a stage adaptation of Phèdre with Helen Mirren. The two lived together in London's Primrose Hill. The couple were in a relationship for six years; however, Negga has pointed out that it took the press years to learn of the break-up, which was first reported in April 2018. Negga appeared opposite Cooper in AMC's Preacher, in which the pair portrayed lovers, and has said that they are "best friends".

As of 2020, Negga resides in Los Angeles, California.

In February 2026, Negga was awarded an honorary doctorate by the University of Limerick.

== Acting credits ==
=== Film ===
Year	Title	Role	Notes
2004	Capital Letters	Taiwo	
2005	Breakfast on Pluto	Charlie	
2005	Isolation	Mary	
2006	Colour Me Kubrick	Lolita	Uncredited
2012	The Samaritan	Iris	
2013	World War Z	WHO doctor	
2013	12 Years a Slave	Celeste	Deleted scenes
2013	Jimi: All Is by My Side	Ida	
2014	Noble	Joan	
2014	Of Mind and Music	Jessica	
2015	Iona	Iona	
2016	Loving	Mildred Loving	
2016	Warcraft	Queen Taria	
2017	Angela's Christmas	Mother	Voice
2019	Ad Astra	Helen Lantos	
2020	Angela's Christmas Wish	Mother	Voice
2021	Passing	Clare Bellew	
2023	Good Grief	Sophie	

=== Television ===
Year	Title	Role	Notes
2004	Doctors	Wanda Harrison	Episode: "The Replacement"
2004	Love Is the Drug	Lisa Sheerin	4 episodes
2008	Criminal Justice	Melanie Lloyd	5 episodes
2009	Personal Affairs	Sid / Doris Siddiqui	Recurring (5 episodes)
2010–2011	Love/Hate	Rosie	Recurring (seasons 1–2)
2010	Five Daughters	Rochelle	3 episodes
2010	Misfits	Nikki	Recurring (season 2)
2010	The Nativity	Leah	4 episodes
2011	Shirley	Shirley Bassey	Main
2012	Secret State	Agnes Evans	Main
2013–2015, 2018	Agents of S.H.I.E.L.D.	Raina	Recurring (seasons 1–2); Guest (season 5); 17 episodes
2016–2019	Preacher	Tulip O'Hare / Lucy O'Hare-Custer	Main; also executive producer
2024	Presumed Innocent	Barbara Sabich	Main role
2025	Phineas and Ferb	Lieutenant Zarna (voice)	Episode: "Space Adventure"
2025	Sausage Party: Foodtopia	Random Foods / Wild Berries (voice)	4 episodes

=== Theatre ===
Year	Title	Role	Venue	Ref.
2003	Duck	Cat	Traverse Theatre, Edinburgh	
2004	The Burial at Thebes	Antigone	Abbey Theatre, Dublin	
2006	The Bacchae of Baghdad	Chorus	Abbey Theatre, Dublin	
2007	The Crucible	Abigail Williams	Abbey Theatre, Dublin	
2009	Phèdre	Aricia	National Theatre, London	
2010	Hamlet	Ophelia	National Theatre, London	
2011	Playboy of the Western World	Pegeen Mike	Old Vic Theatre, London	
2018	Hamlet	Hamlet	Gate Theatre, Dublin	
2020	Hamlet	Hamlet	St. Ann's Warehouse, Off-Broadway	
2022	Macbeth	Lady Macbeth	Longacre Theatre, Broadway	
2024	Quiet Songs	Boy	Barbican's Pit Theatre, London	

=== Video games ===
Year	Title	Role
2011	El Shaddai: Ascension of the Metatron	Ishtar
2014	Dark Souls II	Shanalotte (Emerald Herald)

== Awards and nominations ==
Negga was nominated as 2003's Most Promising Newcomer at the Olivier Awards. She was chosen as Ireland's Shooting Star for the 2006 Berlin Film Festival. She has received many accolades for her role of Mildred Loving in the 2016 film Loving, including Academy Awards, Critic's Choice, and Golden Globe Award nominations for Best Actress. In 2022, her portrayal of Clare Bellew in 2021 film Passing garnered her critical recognition including the National Society of Film Critics Award for Best Supporting Actress, and industry nominations from the Golden Globes, Screen Actors Guild, and the BAFTA.

Year	Association	Category	Work	Result
2004	Laurence Olivier Award	Best Newcomer in a Play	Duck	Nominated
2005	Irish Film & Television Academy	Best Actress in a Supporting Role – Film	Breakfast on Pluto	Nominated
2005	Irish Film & Television Academy	Best Actress in a Lead Role – Film	Isolation	Nominated
2011	Irish Film & Television Academy	Best Actress in a Supporting Role – Television	Love/Hate	Nominated
2012	Irish Film & Television Academy	Best Actress in a Supporting Role – Television	Misfits	Nominated
2012	Irish Film & Television Academy	Best Actress in a Lead Role – Television	Shirley	Won
2012	Royal Television Society	RTS Television Award for Best Actor (Female)	Shirley	Nominated
2012	Irish Film & Television Academy	Best Actress in a Supporting Role – Television	Secret State	Nominated
2015	British Academy Scotland Awards	Best Actress in Film	Iona	Nominated
2015	London Film Critics Circle Awards	British/Irish Actress of the Year	Loving and Iona	Nominated
2016	New York Film Critics Online	Best Breakthrough Performer	Loving	Won
2016	African-American Film Critics Association	Best Actress	Loving	Won
2016	Alliance of Women Film Journalists	Best Actress	Loving	Won
2016	Black Reel Awards	Outstanding Actress	Loving	Won
2016	Palm Springs International Film Festival	Rising Star Award	Loving	Won
2016	Santa Barbara International Film Festival	Vituosos Award	Loving	Won
2016	Satellite Awards	Best Actress (tied with Isabelle Huppert)	Loving	Won
2016	Academy Awards	Best Actress	Loving	Nominated
2016	AACTA International Awards	Best Actress	Loving	Nominated
2016	Austin Film Critics Association	Best Actress	Loving	Nominated
2016	British Academy Film Awards	BAFTA Rising Star Award	Loving	Nominated
2016	Critics' Choice Movie Awards	Best Actress	Loving	Nominated
2016	Dallas–Fort Worth Film Critics Association Awards	Best Actress	Loving	Nominated
2016	Detroit Film Critics Society Awards	Best Actress	Loving	Nominated
2016	Florida Film Critics Circle Awards	Best Actress	Loving	Nominated
2016	Golden Globe Awards	Best Actress in a Motion Picture – Drama	Loving	Nominated
2016	Gotham Independent Film Awards	Best Actress	Loving	Nominated
2016	Independent Spirit Awards	Best Female Lead	Loving	Nominated
2016	London Film Critics Circle Awards	British/Irish Actress of the Year	Loving	Nominated
2016	NAACP Image Awards	Outstanding Actress in a Motion Picture	Loving	Nominated
2016	Online Film Critics Society Awards	Best Actress	Loving	Nominated
2016	San Diego Film Critics Society Awards	Best Actress	Loving	Nominated
2016	San Francisco Film Critics Circle Awards	Best Actress	Loving	Nominated
2016	St. Louis Gateway Film Critics Association Awards	Best Actress	Loving	Nominated
2016	Washington D.C. Area Film Critics Association	Best Actress	Loving	Nominated
2016	Irish Film & Television Academy	Best Actress in a Supporting Role – Drama	Agents of S.H.I.E.L.D.	Nominated
2019	Daytime Emmy Awards	Outstanding Performer in an Animated Program	Angela's Christmas	Nominated
2020	Drama Desk Award	Outstanding Actress in a Play	Hamlet	Nominated
2021	Chicago Film Critics Association	Best Supporting Actress	Passing	Won
2021	Chicago Indie Critics Awards	Best Supporting Actress	Passing	Won
2021	Columbus Film Critics Association	Best Supporting Actress	Passing	Won
2021	Greater Western New York Film Critics Association Awards	Best Supporting Actress	Passing	Won
2021	New York Film Critics Online	Best Supporting Actress	Passing	Won
2021	Philadelphia Film Critics Circle	Best Supporting Actress	Passing	Won
2021	Women Film Critics Circle	Best Screen Couple	Passing	Won
2021	Dallas–Fort Worth Film Critics Association Awards	Best Supporting Actress	Passing	Nominated
2021	Florida Film Critics Circle	Best Supporting Actress	Passing	Nominated
2021	Gotham Independent Film Awards	Outstanding Supporting Performance	Passing	Nominated
2021	Las Vegas Film Critics Society	Best Supporting Actress	Passing	Nominated
2021	North Carolina Film Critics Association	Best Supporting Actress	Passing	Nominated
2021	Portland Critics Association Awards	Best Supporting Actress	Passing	Nominated
2021	San Francisco Film Critics Circle Awards	Best Supporting Actress	Passing	Nominated
2021	St. Louis Gateway Film Critics Association Awards	Best Supporting Actress	Passing	Nominated
2022	Satellite Awards	Best Supporting Actress	Passing	Nominated
2022	Independent Spirit Awards	Best Supporting Female	Passing	Won
2022	International Cinephile Society Awards	Best Supporting Actress	Passing	Won
2022	London Film Critics' Circle	Best Supporting Actress	Passing	Won
2022	National Society of Film Critics	Best Supporting Actress	Passing	Won
2022	San Diego Film Critics Society Awards	Best Supporting Actress	Passing	Won
2022	Alliance of Women Film Journalists	Best Supporting Actress	Passing	Nominated
2022	Alliance of Women Film Journalists	Most Daring Performance	Passing	Nominated
2022	Austin Film Critics Association	Best Supporting Actress	Passing	Nominated
2022	Black Reel Awards	Outstanding Supporting Actress	Passing	Nominated
2022	British Academy Film Awards	Best Actress in a Supporting Role	Passing	Nominated
2022	DiscussingFilm Critics Awards	Best Supporting Actress	Passing	Nominated
2022	Georgia Film Critics Association	Best Supporting Actress	Passing	Nominated
2022	Golden Globe Awards	Best Supporting Actress	Passing	Nominated
2022	Hollywood Critics Association	Best Supporting Actress	Passing	Nominated
2022	North Dakota Film Society	Best Supporting Actress	Passing	Nominated
2022	Online Film Critics Society	Best Supporting Actress	Passing	Nominated
2022	Seattle Film Critics Society	Best Supporting Actress	Passing	Nominated
2022	Screen Actors Guild Awards	Outstanding Performance by a Female Actor in a Supporting Role	Passing	Nominated
2022	Toronto Film Critics Association	Best Supporting Actress	Passing	Nominated
2022	Tony Awards	Best Actress in a Play	Macbeth	Nominated
2025	Primetime Emmy Awards	Outstanding Supporting Actress in a Limited Series or Movie	Presumed Innocent	Nominated

== See also ==
- List of Irish actors
- List of Academy Award winners and nominees from Ireland
- List of actors with Academy Award nominations
