= Isla Fisher =

Australian actress (born 1976)

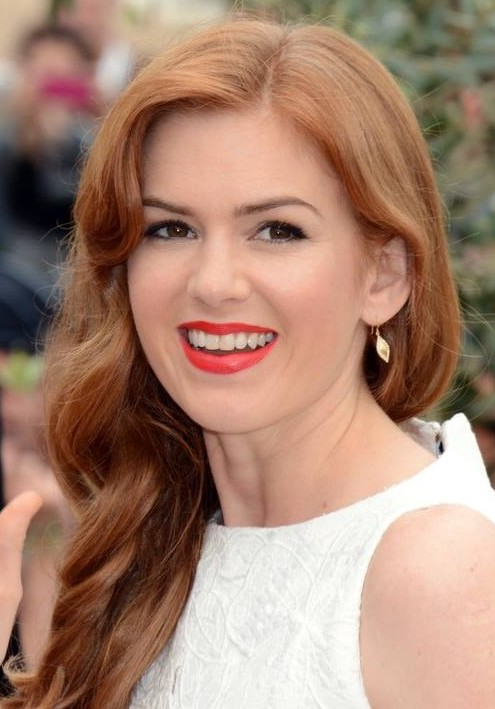
- Fisher in 2013
- Born: Isla Lang Fisher; 3 February 1976 (age 50); Muscat, Oman
- Citizenship: Australia
- Occupation: Actress
- Years active: 1985–present
- Spouse: Sacha Baron Cohen (m. 2010; div. 2025)
- Children: 3

Isla Lang Fisher (/ˈaɪlə/; born 3 February 1976) is an Australian actress. Born in Muscat, Oman to Scottish parents with whom she moved to Australia during her childhood, she began appearing in television commercials before portraying, aged 18 to 21, the character of Shannon Reed in Home and Away, an Australian television soap opera.

Fisher moved to Hollywood with a supporting role in the comedy horror film Scooby-Doo (2002) and has since starred in films such as Wedding Crashers (2005), Wedding Daze (2006), Confessions of a Shopaholic (2009), Bachelorette (2012), The Great Gatsby (2013), Now You See Me (2013), and Nocturnal Animals (2016). Her other credits include I Heart Huckabees (2004), Definitely, Maybe (2008), Keeping Up with the Joneses (2016), Tag (2018), and The Beach Bum (2019), in addition to voice roles in animated films such as Horton Hears a Who! (2008), Rango (2011), Rise of the Guardians (2012), Back to the Outback (2021), and Dog Man (2025).

Fisher had a recurring role on the fourth and fifth seasons of the sitcom Arrested Development (2013–2019) and has starred in the comedy drama series Wolf Like Me since 2022. She has authored two young adult novels and the Marge in Charge book series. From 2010 to 2025, she was married to English comedian Sacha Baron Cohen, with whom she has three children.

== Early life ==
Isla Lang Fisher was born in Muscat, Oman, on 3 February 1976, the daughter of Scottish parents Elspeth Reid and Brian Fisher. At the time, her father was working there as a banker for the United Nations. Fisher and her family returned to their hometown of Bathgate, West Lothian, then immigrated to Australia when she was six years old, settling in Perth, Western Australia. She has four brothers and once mentioned having a "great" upbringing in Perth with a "very outdoorsy life". According to Fisher, her "sensibility is Australian", she has a "laid-back attitude to life", and that she feels "very Australian".

Fisher attended Swanbourne Primary School in Swanbourne and Methodist Ladies' College. She appeared in lead roles in school productions such as Little Shop of Horrors. At the age of 21, Fisher attended L'École Internationale de Théâtre Jacques Lecoq, where she studied clowning, mime, musical theatre, and commedia dell'arte.

Fisher's parents later separated; her mother and brothers now live in Athens, Greece, while her father lived in Frankfurt, Germany. He died in January 2023.

== Career ==
=== 1985–2001: Early acting credits ===
Fisher made her first on-screen appearances in commercials on Australian television at the age of 9, and made her professional acting debut in 1993 with two guest-starring roles in the children's television shows Bay City and Paradise Beach. At 18, with her mother's help, she published two teen novels, Bewitched and Seduced by Fame. In a 2005 interview with Sunday Mirror, she said that had she not been successful as an actress, she would probably have been a full-time writer.

Between 1994 and 1997, Fisher played Shannon Reed, a young woman who develops anorexia, on the Australian soap opera Home and Away. In a 1996 interview with The Sun-Herald, she spoke of her success and experiences on the show: "I would be stupid to let it go to my head because it could all end tomorrow and I would just fade back into obscurity. I like working on Home and Away but it's a heavy workload so I get stressed out a lot. We work about 15 hours a day, including the time it takes to learn lines. I know a lot of people work those sort of hours but I think we really feel it because most of us are young and fairly inexperienced. But I am very grateful because it is good experience. It's like an apprenticeship, but we do it in front of 20 million people so all our mistakes are up for the world to see." For her performance in the series, Fisher received nominations for Most Popular New Talent at the 1995 Logie Awards, and for Most Popular Actress at the 1997 ceremony.

After leaving Home and Away, Fisher enrolled at L'École Internationale de Théâtre Jacques Lecoq, a theatre and arts training school in Paris, and went on to appear in pantomime in the United Kingdom. She also toured with Darren Day in the musical Summer Holiday; appeared in the London theatre production of Così, and played an ill-fated member of an elite group of international students in the German slasher film Swimming Pool (2001).

=== 2002–2004: Move to Hollywood ===
Fisher transitioned to Hollywood in 2002, with the part of the love interest of cowardly slacker Shaggy Rogers in the live-action film Scooby-Doo. Although Scooby-Doo received negative reviews, the film was a commercial success, grossing US$275.7 million worldwide. On that early stage in her career, Fisher remarked: "I only came out on the back of the movie for the premiere of Scooby Doo. And then, I ended up getting representation and ended up getting a job, almost straight away. So, I was fortunate, in that I didn't have to come out to L.A. and join a queue of however many people, and try to get work. I came in on the back of what was deemed as a big studio movie that had had extraordinary success". She subsequently played supporting roles in the independent film Dallas 362 (2003) and the Australian comedy The Wannabes (also 2003). In his review for the latter, David Rooney of Variety felt that Fisher "adds easy charm and a thinly developed hint of romantic interest", in what he summed as an "uneven but endearing farce about breaking into showbiz". In the comedy I Heart Huckabees (2004), directed by David O. Russell, she played what was described as a "punchy little part", by newspaper The Age.

=== 2005–2009: Breakthrough ===
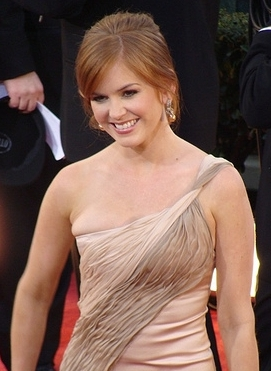
Fisher at the 66th Golden Globe Awards (2009)

Fisher's breakthrough came with the comedy Wedding Crashers (2005), opposite Vince Vaughn and Owen Wilson, taking on the role of the seemingly sexually aggressive and precocious younger daughter of a politician falling in love with an irresponsible wedding crasher. On her part in the film, she remarked: "It was an interesting character to play, because she was so crazy and lacking in any kind of social etiquette. She doesn't care what anyone thinks." For one particular scene, involving sexual content, she used a body double. "I negotiated that from the beginning, trying to analyse why. I find pornographic violence, just gratuitous and unnecessary than nudity, because there's nothing more peaceful and beautiful". The film was favourably received by critics and made US$285.1 million worldwide. Empire magazine found Fisher to be an "unexpected, scene-stealing joy", and her performance earned her the Best Breakthrough Performance Award at the 2006 MTV Movie Awards and two Teen Choice Awards nominations.

Fisher appeared as a Manhattan party host in the independent drama London (2005), opposite Jessica Biel, Chris Evans and Jason Statham. She next starred in the romantic comedy Wedding Daze (2006), with Jason Biggs, playing a dissatisfied waitress who spontaneously gets engaged to a grieving young man. While Wedding Daze opened in second place on its UK opening weekend, the film received mediocre reviews from critics. Nevertheless, Reel Film Reviews found the film to be an "irreverent, sporadically hilarious romantic comedy that boasts fantastic performances from stars Jason Biggs and Isla Fisher". In the thriller The Lookout (2007), opposite Joseph Gordon-Levitt and Matthew Goode, Fisher played a woman used by a gang leader to seduce a man with lasting mental impairments. Describing on how she took her character, she said: "It was one of those situations where I read the script and thought, 'This is the take. I don't want to play the cliché femme fatale. I don't want to come in and be the woman with the sexual appetite, who wants to take down this man. I want to come in and make her this big beating heart, and innocent a woman who has no identity, who knows the man she's with, who doesn't have an agenda.' Because every character in the script has an agenda. I thought how interesting if my character doesn't have one if she's a victim of her own kindness. So, that was my starting point." While The Lookout received a limited release, the film was favourably received. The comedy Hot Rod (also 2007), with Andy Samberg, saw Fisher star as the college-graduate neighbour on whom an amateur stuntman has a crush.

Fisher appeared in a deleted scene from The Simpsons Movie, where she and Erin Brockovich played consultants. Fisher played a copy girl who becomes romantically involved with an ambitious political consultant in the romantic comedy Definitely, Maybe (2008), with Ryan Reynolds, Elizabeth Banks, Rachel Weisz and Abigail Breslin. Reviewers felt the film was a "refreshing entry into the romantic comedy genre", and The New Yorker wrote that the "interest lies" in the female characters, concluding: "Isla Fisher, short, with thick auburn hair, is a changeable free spirit who keeps the male lead, and maybe herself off balance". Budgeted at US$7 million, Definitely, Maybe was a commercial success, grossing US$55.4 million worldwide. Fisher also voiced a professor in a city of microscopic creatures in the animated comedy film Horton Hears a Who! (2008), featuring Jim Carrey, Steve Carell, Will Arnett, among others.

Fisher obtained her first leading film role in the comedy Confessions of a Shopaholic (2009), where she played a college graduate who works as a financial journalist in New York City to support her shopping addiction. She felt "apprehensive" as she took on her first star vehicle, stating: "I was gobsmacked that anyone would give me my own movie. I am eternally bewildered. Every time I see [producer] Jerry Bruckheimer, I want to shake him and say: 'Are you mad? Why would you put me on a poster?'". Upon its release, the film received lukewarm reviews from critics; while Time Out described her as "silly and adorable", The Christian Science Monitor remarked: "Isla Fisher is such a bundle of comic energy that watching her spin her wheels in the aggressively unfunny Confessions of a Shopaholic counts as cruel and unusual punishment for her as well as for us". Despite the critical response, the film was a commercial success; it opened with US$15 million on its North America opening weekend and went on to gross US$108.3 million worldwide. Fisher received her third Teen Choice Award nomination.

=== 2010–2013: Mainstream recognition ===
In the British black comedy Burke and Hare (2010), loosely based on the Burke and Hare murders, Fisher starred opposite Simon Pegg and Andy Serkis as a young former prostitute and the love interest of one of the titular characters. The film found a limited audience in theatres, and Variety wrote that "Pegg and Fisher, just about holding up their end of the bargain by delivering the film's portion of sweet romance, are hardly given anything funny to say", as part of an overall mixed reception. Fisher voiced a hot-tempered but good-hearted desert iguana befriending an eccentric chameleon in the 3D animated Western action comedy Rango (2011), featuring Johnny Depp, Abigail Breslin and Bill Nighy. The film received positive reviews and made US$245.7 million worldwide. For her role, Fisher won the Alliance of Women Film Journalists Award for Best Animated Female.

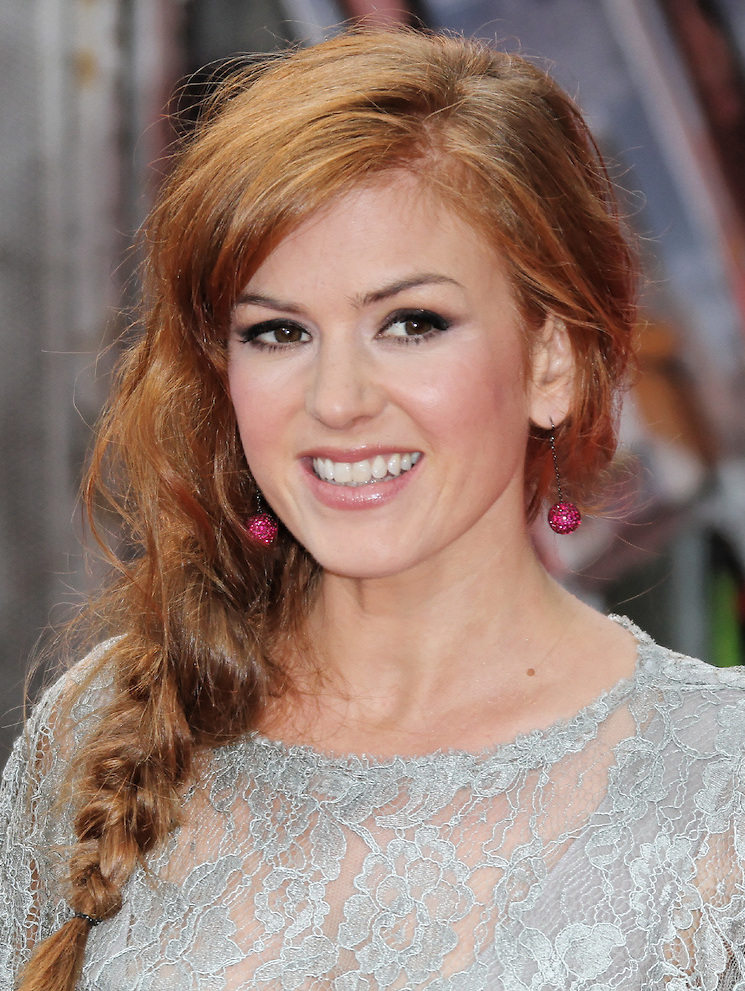
Fisher at the premiere of The Dictator in London, May 2012

Fisher starred in the comedy Bachelorette (2012), opposite Kirsten Dunst, Lizzy Caplan and Rebel Wilson, portraying a ditzy party girl and one-third of a trio of troubled women who reunite for the wedding of a friend who was ridiculed in high school. In its review for the film, Daily Telegraph found Fisher to be "brilliantly slow as a hot mess whose main ambition is to get coked out of her skull". Budgeted at US$3 million, Bachelorette was a commercial success; it grossed US$11.9 million in theatres worldwide and more than US$8 million on VOD. In another voice-over role, Fisher voiced the Tooth Fairy in what she summed up as an "animated Avengers", the film Rise of the Guardians (also 2012), which earned her an Alliance of Women Film Journalists Award nomination for Best Animated Female.

In 2013 Fisher appeared in two big budget Hollywood films The Great Gatsby and Now You See Me. The Great Gatsby, an adaptation of F. Scott Fitzgerald's 1925 novel, directed by Baz Luhrmann, and opposite Leonardo DiCaprio, Carey Mulligan and Tobey Maguire, saw her portray an ambitious social climber and the mistress of an upper-class socialite. Fisher described as "surreal" the experience to work for Luhrmann. "He's my dream director. I've only ever had a short list of people I've wanted to work with, and he was at the top of it. I honestly couldn't stop smiling the whole time". While reviewers described her role as brief, the film made US$353.6 million worldwide. Fisher garnered nominations for the Best Supporting Actress award from the AACTA Awards, the Australian Film Critics Association and the Film Critics Circle of Australia Awards. Fisher took on a larger role as an escapist and stage magician in the heist thriller Now You See Me, with Jesse Eisenberg, Mark Ruffalo, Woody Harrelson, Mélanie Laurent and Morgan Freeman. The Hollywood Reporter felt that Fisher's portrayal was "loaded with chutzpah", and IndieWire remarked in its review for the film: "While Fisher and Laurent bring their charm, they still don't quite flesh out underwritten parts". Like The Great Gatsby, Now You See Me grossed more than US$350 million globally.

Also in 2013, Fisher obtained the nine-episode role of an actress in the fourth season of Arrested Development, which was released on Netflix, and appeared opposite Jennifer Aniston, Tim Robbins, and Will Forte in Life of Crime, a film adaptation of Elmore Leonard's 1978 novel The Switch, as the mistress of a wealthy man who refuses to pay the ransom for his kidnapped wife. The film received a limited theatrical release and favorable reviews from critics. Fisher, along with the cast of Arrested Development, received a Screen Actors Guild Award nomination for Outstanding Performance by an Ensemble in a Comedy Series, and describing her work on the series as a career highlight, she said: "I've been really fortunate in my career to work with a lot of great people and get a lot of great gigs, but my favourite phone call ever was the Arrested Development one from my agent, It was very exciting".

=== 2014–present: Various roles and writing ===
In Visions (2015), an independent horror film, Fisher starred as a pregnant woman who begins to experience supernatural manifestations after moving to a vineyard with her husband. Distributed for a limited release in most international markets, Visions was released for VOD in North America, and in its review for the film, Spanish newspaper Reforma wrote: "Predictable and boring, even Isla Fisher, who is usually pretty good, delivers a very boring performance." 2016 saw Fisher appear in two action comedy films Grimsby and Keeping Up with the Joneses. She collaborated for the first time with husband Sacha Baron Cohen in the British film Grimsby, playing the handler of the best MI6 agent, and in Keeping Up with the Joneses, she starred as one half of a suburban couple who begin to suspect their new neighbours are secret agents. Both films were budgeted at over US$35 million, but only made less than US$30 million at the box office.

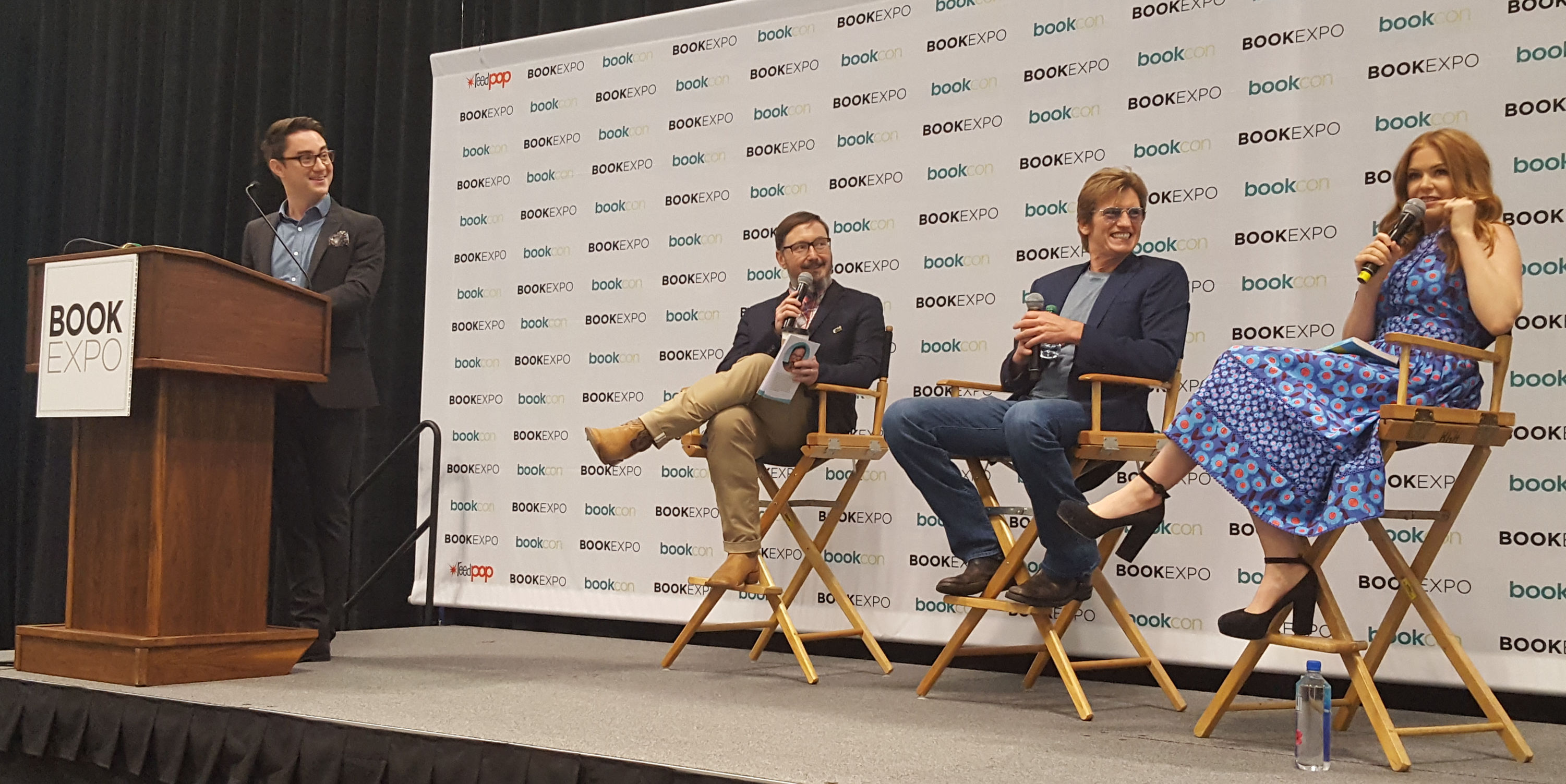
John Hodgman, Denis Leary and Fisher at the BookExpo in 2017

Based on Austin Wright's novel Tony and Susan, Tom Ford's neo-noir thriller Nocturnal Animals (2016) featured Fisher as the blighted wife of a motorist inside a violent novel written by a recently divorced man. The film was the winner of the Grand Jury Prize at the 73rd Venice International Film Festival and was an arthouse success. Her third book and first children's novel, Marge in Charge, revolving around a mischievous babysitter with rainbow hair who tends to bend the rules, was published in 2016. The book was met with a positive reception; Publishers Weekly noted that "spontaneity and mayhem" reign in the work, while The Daily Express found "the comic tale of [the] anarchic babysitter" to be "perfect for reading aloud". Fisher subsequently authored three follow-ups: Marge and the Pirate Baby, in 2017, Marge and the Great Train Rescue, also in 2017, and Marge in Charge and the Stolen Treasure, in 2018. In 2019, she guest starred in an episode of the tenth season of HBO's Curb Your Enthusiasm. In 2020, Fisher starred in the Walt Disney Pictures film Godmothered, which was released on Disney+ on 4 December of that year. In 2023 she starred in Strays, a comedy about a group of dogs on an adventure, Fisher was the voice of Maggie.

In 2025, she voiced Sarah Hatoff in the animated film Dog Man. Also in 2025, Fisher returned to the Now You See Me franchise after twelve years with its third installment, Now You See Me: Now You Don't, after not appearing in the second film due to her pregnancy.

== Philanthropy ==
In 2014 and 2015, Fisher donated her signed shoes for the Small Steps Project Celebrity Shoe Auction.

In 2015, Fisher and her then husband Sacha Baron Cohen donated £335,000 to Save the Children as part of a programme to vaccinate Syrian children against measles, and another £335,000 to the International Rescue Committee to help Syrian refugees.

== Personal life ==
In 2001, Fisher met English comedian and actor Sacha Baron Cohen at a party in Sydney. They became engaged in 2004 and were married on 15 March 2010 in a Jewish ceremony in Paris.

She converted to Judaism to marry Baron Cohen. She took the Hebrew name Ayala (אילה), the Hebrew word for a doe, and has said that she observes Shabbat. Baron Cohen and Fisher have three children, born in 2007, 2010 and 2015. They resided in Sydney, having previously divided their time between Los Angeles and London.

Fisher and Baron Cohen separated at the end of 2023. By June 2025, their divorce was finalised.

== Filmography ==
Key
†	Denotes films that have not yet been released

=== Film ===
Year	Title	Role	Notes	Ref.
1997	Bum Magnet	Emma	Short film	
1998	Furnished Room	Jennie	Short film	
2000	Out of Depth	Australian Girl #1		
2001	Swimming Pool	Kim		
2002	Dog Days	Bianca		
2002	Scooby-Doo	Mary Jane		
2003	The Wannabes	Kirsty		
2003	Dallas 362	Redhead		
2004	I Heart Huckabees	Heather		
2005	Wedding Crashers	Gloria Cleary		
2005	London	Rebecca		
2006	Wedding Daze	Katie		
2007	The Lookout	Luvlee		
2007	The Simpsons Movie	Consultant	Voice, scenes deleted	
2007	Hot Rod	Denise		
2008	Definitely, Maybe	April		
2008	Horton Hears a Who!	Dr. Mary Lou Larue	Voice	
2009	Confessions of a Shopaholic	Rebecca Bloomwood		
2010	Burke and Hare	Ginny Hawkins		
2011	Rango	Beans	Voice	
2012	Bachelorette	Katie		
2012	Rise of the Guardians	Tooth Fairy	Voice	
2013	The Great Gatsby	Myrtle Wilson		
2013	Now You See Me	Henley Reeves		
2013	Life of Crime	Melanie Ralston		
2015	Visions	Eveleigh		
2015	Klown Forever	Herself	Cameo	
2016	Grimsby	Jodie Figgs		
2016	Keeping Up with the Joneses	Karen Gaffney		
2016	Nocturnal Animals	Laura Hastings		
2018	Tag	Anna Malloy		
2019	The Beach Bum	Minnie		
2019	Greed	Samantha		
2020	Blithe Spirit	Ruth Condomine		
2020	Godmothered	MacKenzie Walsh		
2021	Back to the Outback	Maddie	Voice	
2023	Strays	Maggie	Voice	
2024	The Present	Jen Diehl		
2025	Dog Man	Sarah Hatoff	Voice	
2025	Bridget Jones: Mad About the Boy	Rebecca	Cameo	
2025	Jay Kelly	Melanie Alcock		
2025	Playdate	Leslie		
2025	Now You See Me: Now You Don't	Henley Reeves		
2026	Spa Weekend	Mel		
TBA	Bitcoin †	TBA	Post-production	
TBA	Bare †	TBA	Filming	

=== Television ===
Year	Title	Role	Notes
1993	Bay Cove	Vanessa Walker	Series
1993	Paradise Beach	Robyn Devereaux Barsby	2 episodes
1994–1997	Home and Away	Shannon Reed	345 episodes
1998	Big Break	Herself (Contestant)	Christmas Special
1999	Oliver Twist	Bet	Miniseries
2000	Sunburn	Woman	1 episode
2000	Hearts and Bones	Australian Barmaid	1 episode
2001	Attila	Cerca	Miniseries
2002	Beastmaster	Demon Manaka	1 episode
2003	Da Ali G Show	Thug Bitch (Spyz)	Episode: "Belief"
2004	Pilot Season	Butterfly	1 episode
2010	Neighbors from Hell	Unnamed	3 episodes; voice
2011	Bored to Death	Rose	2 episodes
2013, 2018	Arrested Development	Rebel Alley	13 episodes (season 4–5)
2015	Sofia the First	Button	2 episodes; voice
2018	Angie Tribeca	Lana Bobanna	Episode: "Glitch Perfect"
2020	Curb Your Enthusiasm	Carol	1 episode
2022–2023	Wolf Like Me	Mary	Lead role, also executive producer
2026	Life, Larry and the Pursuit of Unhappiness	Elsbeth	Episode 6 ("Buzz")

== Awards and nominations ==
Year	Association	Category	Work	Result	Ref.
2006	MTV Movie Awards	Best Breakthrough Performance	Wedding Crashers	Won	
2006	Teen Choice Awards	Choice Breakout (Female)	Wedding Crashers	Nominated	
2006	Teen Choice Awards	Choice Hissy Fit	Wedding Crashers	Nominated	
2008	Elle Women in Hollywood Awards	Icon Award	—N/a	Won	
2009	Teen Choice Awards	Choice Movie Actress: Comedy	Confessions of a Shopaholic	Nominated	
2012	Alliance of Women Film Journalists	Best Animated Female	Rango	Won	
2013	Alliance of Women Film Journalists	Best Animated Female	Rise of the Guardians	Nominated	
2014	AACTA Awards	Best Supporting Actress	The Great Gatsby	Nominated	
2014	Australian Film Critics Association	Best Supporting Actress	The Great Gatsby	Nominated	
2014	Film Critics Circle of Australia Awards	Best Supporting Actress	The Great Gatsby	Nominated	
2014	Jupiter Award	Best International Actress	The Great Gatsby	Nominated	
2014	Screen Actors Guild Awards	Outstanding Performance by an Ensemble in a Comedy Series	Arrested Development	Nominated	
2016	AACTA Awards	Trailblazer Award	—N/a	Won	

== Works and publications ==
- Fisher, Isla; Reid, Elspeth (1995). Bewitched. Ringwood, Victoria: Penguin. ISBN 978-0-14-025575-1. OCLC 38382626.
- Fisher, Isla (1995). Seduced by Fame. Ringwood, Victoria: Penguin. ISBN 978-0-14-025431-0. OCLC 38376530.
- Fisher, Isla; Ceulemans, Eglantine (2016). Marge in Charge. London: Piccadilly Press. ISBN 978-1-84-812540-7. OCLC 957646590.
- Fisher, Isla; Bowles, Paula (2022). Mazy the Movie Star. London: Welbeck Flame. ISBN 978-1-80-130016-2. OCLC 1333579159.
