= Tom Ford =

American fashion designer and filmmaker (born 1961)

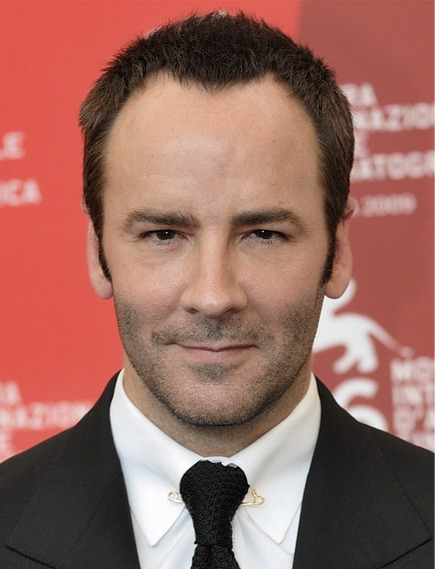
- Ford in 2009
- Born: Thomas Carlyle Ford; August 27, 1961 (age 65); Austin, Texas, U.S.
- Education: Santa Fe Preparatory School; The New School (B.Arch.)
- Occupations: Fashion designer; filmmaker
- Spouse: Richard Buckley (m. 2014; died 2021)
- Children: 1

Thomas Carlyle Ford (born August 27, 1961) is an American fashion designer and filmmaker. He launched his eponymous fashion brand in 2005, having previously been the creative director at Gucci and Yves Saint Laurent. He wrote and directed the films A Single Man (2009) and Nocturnal Animals (2016) and served as chairman of the Council of Fashion Designers of America from 2019 to 2022.

== Early life ==
Thomas Carlyle Ford was born on August 27, 1961, in Austin, Texas, the son of realtors Shirley Burton (née Shirley Ann Thrasher) and Thomas David Ford (1932–2020). He has a sister named Jennifer. He spent his early life in Texas, specifically Houston and San Marcos. He rearranged furniture in the house at the age of six and gave his mother advice on her hair and shoes. When he was 11, his family moved to Santa Fe, New Mexico. He studied at St. Michael's High School and later moved to Santa Fe Preparatory School.

At age 16, Ford enrolled at Bard College at Simon's Rock, but quickly dropped out. He moved to New York City to study art history at New York University. There he met Ian Falconer, who took him to Studio 54 for the first time. Ford dropped out after a year, focusing on acting in television commercials.

Ford began studying interior architecture at The New School's art and design college, Parsons The New School for Design, in New York City. He continued to frequent Studio 54, where he realized he was gay. The club's disco-era glamour would be a major influence on his later designs. Before his last year at New School, Ford spent a year and a half in Paris, where he worked as an intern in Chloé's press office, inspiring his interest in fashion. He spent his final year at The New School studying fashion, but graduated with a degree in architecture.

== Fashion career ==
=== Early career ===
When interviewing for jobs after graduation, Ford said that he had attended The New School's Parsons division, but concealed that he graduated in architecture, and that his work at Chloé was a low-level public relations position. Despite his lack of experience in fashion, Ford called American designer Cathy Hardwick every day for a month in hopes of securing a job at her sportswear company. Hardwick eventually agreed to interview him. She later recalled the incident: "I had every intention of giving him no hope. I asked him who his favorite European designers were. He said, 'Armani and Chanel.' Months later I asked him why he said that, and he said, 'Because you were wearing something Armani.' Is it any wonder he got the job?" Ford worked as a design assistant for Hardwick for two years.

In 1988, Ford moved to Perry Ellis, where he knew both Robert McDonald, the company's president, and Marc Jacobs, its designer, socially. He worked at the company for two years, but grew tired of working in American fashion. In a later interview with The New York Times, he commented, "If I was ever going to become a good designer, I had to leave America. My own culture was inhibiting me. Too much style in America is tacky. It's looked down upon to be too stylish. Europeans, however, appreciate style."

At the time, Italian fashion house Gucci was struggling financially and was seeking to strengthen its women's ready-to-wear presence as a part of a brand overhaul. The company's creative director, Dawn Mello said, "no one would dream of wearing Gucci". In 1990, Mello hired Ford as the brand's chief women's ready-to-wear designer and Ford moved to Milan. "I was talking to a lot of people, and most didn't want the job," Mello said. "For an American designer to move to Italy to join a company that was far from being a brand would have been pretty risky." Ford and his longtime partner, fashion journalist Richard Buckley, relocated to Milan that September.

Ford's role at Gucci rapidly expanded; he was designing menswear within six months, and shoes soon after that. When Richard Lambertson left as design director in 1992, Ford took over his position, heading the brand's ready-to-wear, fragrances, image, advertising, and store design. In 1993, when he was in charge of designing eleven product lines, Ford worked eighteen-hour days. During these years, there were creative tensions between Ford and Maurizio Gucci, the company's chairman and 50% owner. According to Mello, "Maurizio always wanted everything to be round and brown, and Tom wanted to make it square and black." Though Maurizio Gucci wanted to fire Ford, Domenico De Sole insisted that he remain. Nonetheless, Ford's work during the early 1990s was primarily behind the scenes; his contributions to Gucci were overshadowed by those of Mello, who was the company's public face.

=== Creative Director of Gucci and Saint Laurent ===
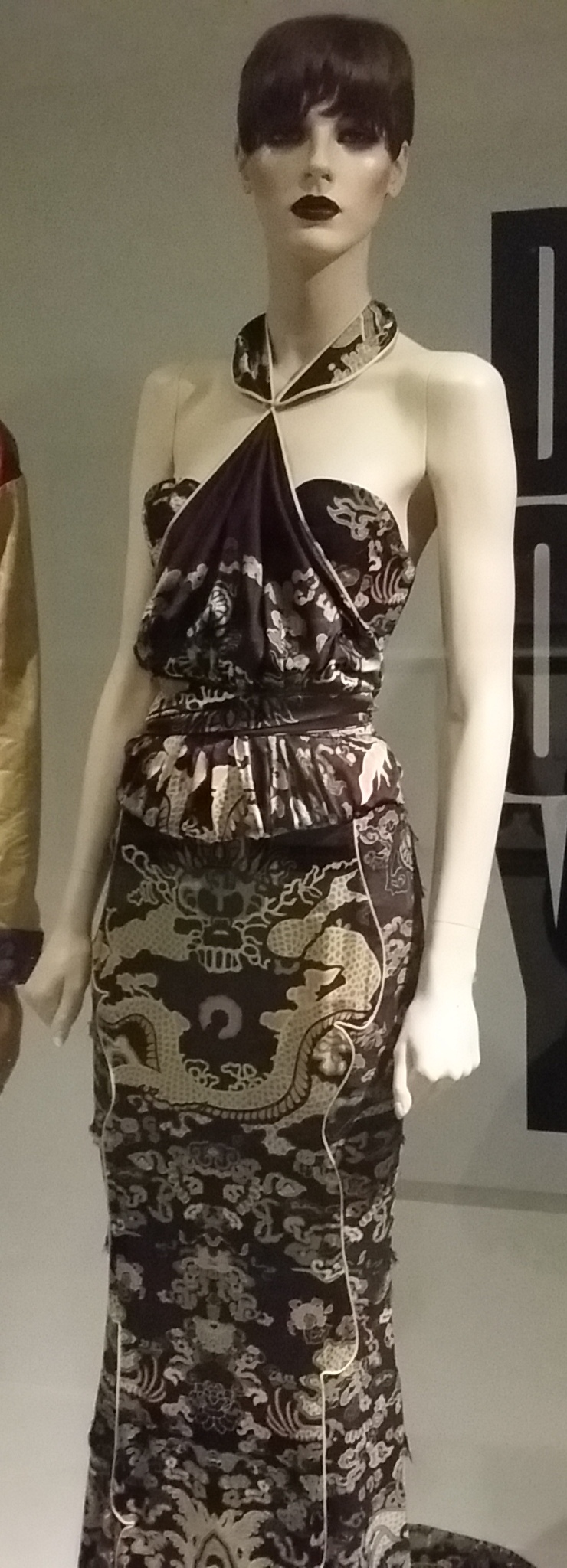
Evening dress by Tom Ford for Yves Saint Laurent Rive Gauche. Selected as Dress of the Year for 2004

In 1994, Ford was promoted to Creative Director of Gucci. In his first year at the helm, he introduced Halston-style velvet hipsters, skinny satin shirts and car-finish metallic patent boots. In 1995, he brought in French stylist Carine Roitfeld and photographer Mario Testino to create a series of new ad campaigns for the company. Between 1995 and 1996, sales at Gucci increased by 90%. At one point, Ford was the largest individual shareholder of Gucci stock and options. By 1999, the house, which had been almost insolvent when Ford joined, was valued at more than $4 billion.

When Gucci acquired the house of Yves Saint Laurent (YSL) in 1999, Ford was named Creative Director of that label as well. Saint Laurent did not hide his displeasure with Ford's designs, stating "The poor man does what he can." During his time as creative director for YSL, Ford nonetheless won numerous Council of Fashion Designers of America Awards. Ford was able to pull the classic fashion house back into the mainstream. His advertising campaigns for the YSL fragrances Opium (with a red-haired Sophie Dahl naked wearing only a necklace and stiletto heels in a sexually suggestive pose) and YSL M7 (with martial arts champion Samuel de Cubber in complete full-frontal nudity) were controversial and provocative.

In April 2004, Ford parted ways with the Gucci group after he and CEO Domenico de Sole, who is credited as Ford's partner in Gucci's success, failed to agree with Pinault Printemps Redoute's boss over control of the Group. He has since referred to this experience as "devastating" and as a "midlife crisis" because he had "put everything into that for fifteen years". When Ford left in 2004, Gucci Group was valued at $10 billion. Four people were hired to split the work Ford had done.

=== Tom Ford label ===
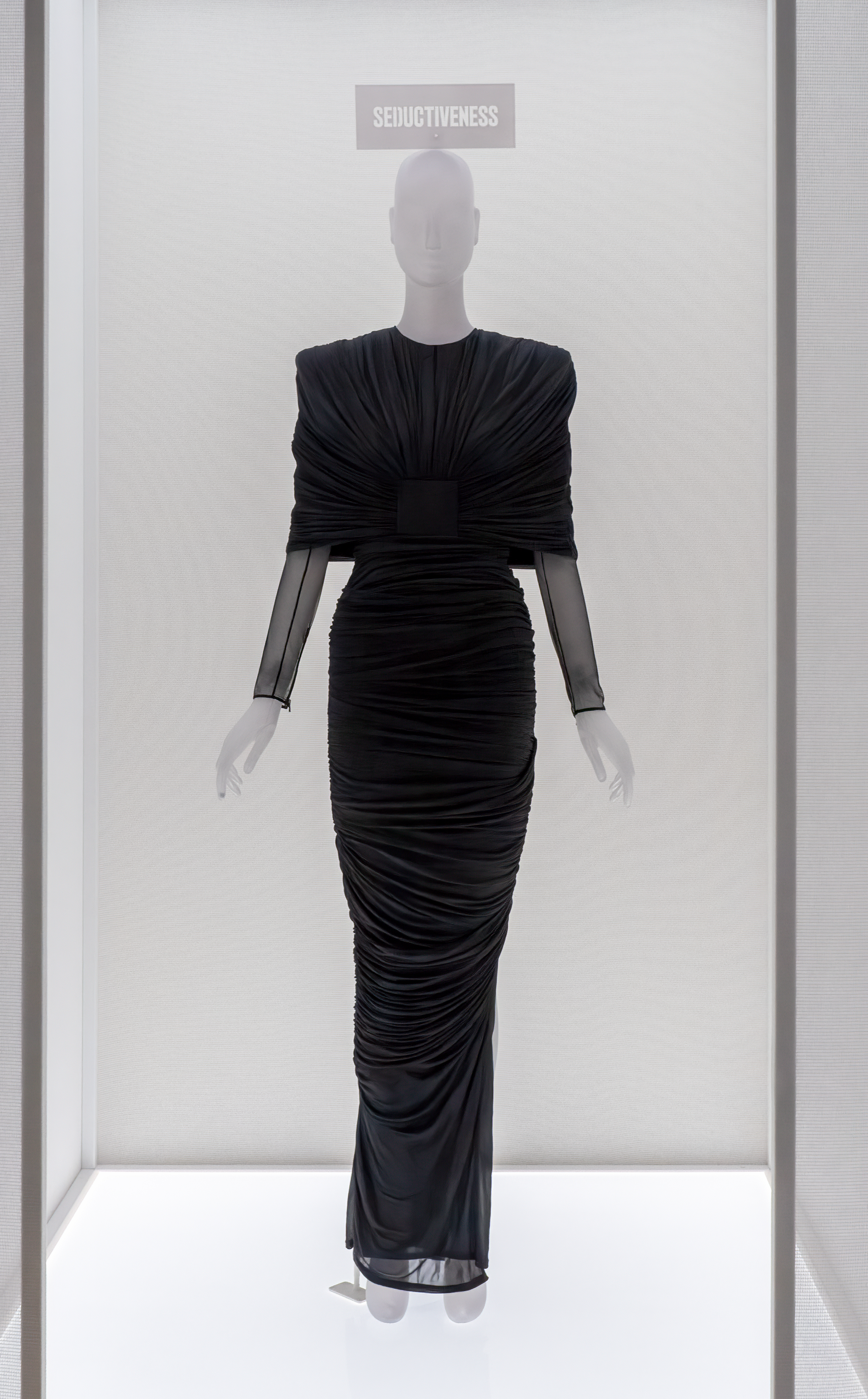
A dress Ford designed in 2018 in the Metropolitan Museum of Art exhibition In America: A Lexicon of Fashion

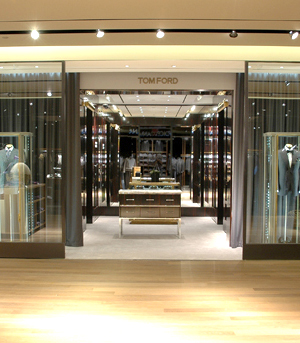
A Tom Ford boutique in Toronto

After leaving Gucci, Ford launched a line of menswear, beauty, eyewear, and accessories in 2006, named after himself. De Sole became chairman of the label. Ford has described "the Tom Ford customer" as international, cultured, well-traveled, and possessing disposable income. For women, he added "strong women, … intelligent women who know their own style".

First Lady Michelle Obama wore an ivory floor-length evening gown designed by Ford to Buckingham Palace in 2011. He has also dressed Beyoncé, Jennifer Lopez, Gwyneth Paltrow, Anne Hathaway, Daniel Craig, Tom Hanks, Johnny Depp, Ryan Gosling, Will Smith, Julianne Moore, Hugh Jackman, Jon Hamm, and Henry Cavill. Ford designed Daniel Craig's suits for his final four James Bond films: Quantum of Solace (2008), Skyfall (2012), Spectre (2015), and No Time to Die (2021).

In 2013, Ford was mentioned in Justin Timberlake's song "Suit & Tie", which was a collaboration with Jay-Z; he created the suits, shirts, and accessories for the Grammy-winning music video. He went on to dress Timberlake's 20/20 Experience World Tour, designing over 600 pieces for the tour. The same year, Jay-Z released the song "Tom Ford". Ford responded that he was flattered and "it means that one has really penetrated and made an impact on popular culture." Following the song's release, Ford received a huge spike in online search engine queries. The song would go on to sell over a million copies and become certified platinum.

In November 2022, the Tom Ford beauty brand was purchased by Estée Lauder for $2.8 billion. Forbes estimated that Ford would earn $1.1 billion from the deal. The following April, Ford stepped down as the brand's creative director and was succeeded by designer Peter Hawkings. The Tom Ford brand is now owned by The Estée Lauder Companies while the fashion business is owned by the Ermenegildo Zegna Group through Tom Ford International.

=== Controversies ===
Ford has been criticized for using naked women in various ad campaigns. Various journalists asserted that the ads were vulgar, sexist, or objectified women. One ad featured a nude woman holding a bottle of the perfume between her legs. Another featured a naked woman ironing a man's pants while he read a newspaper. A separate ad was banned in Italy.

Responding to criticism that he objectified women, Ford stated he is an "equal opportunity objectifier" and is "just as happy to objectify men". He argued "you can't show male nudity in our culture in the way you can show female nudity" and pointed out that he did a male nude ad while at Yves Saint Laurent which got pulled.

In 2014, Ford released a new product called the Penis Pendant Necklace. The product caused some controversy, with Christians calling it offensive due to the pendant being shaped similar to a Christian cross or crucifix. Ford replied that "it was not meant to be a cross, it was a phallus" and "people read into things what they want to".

In 2022, Ford criticized the Met Gala, stating the event had "turned into a costume party".

== Film career ==
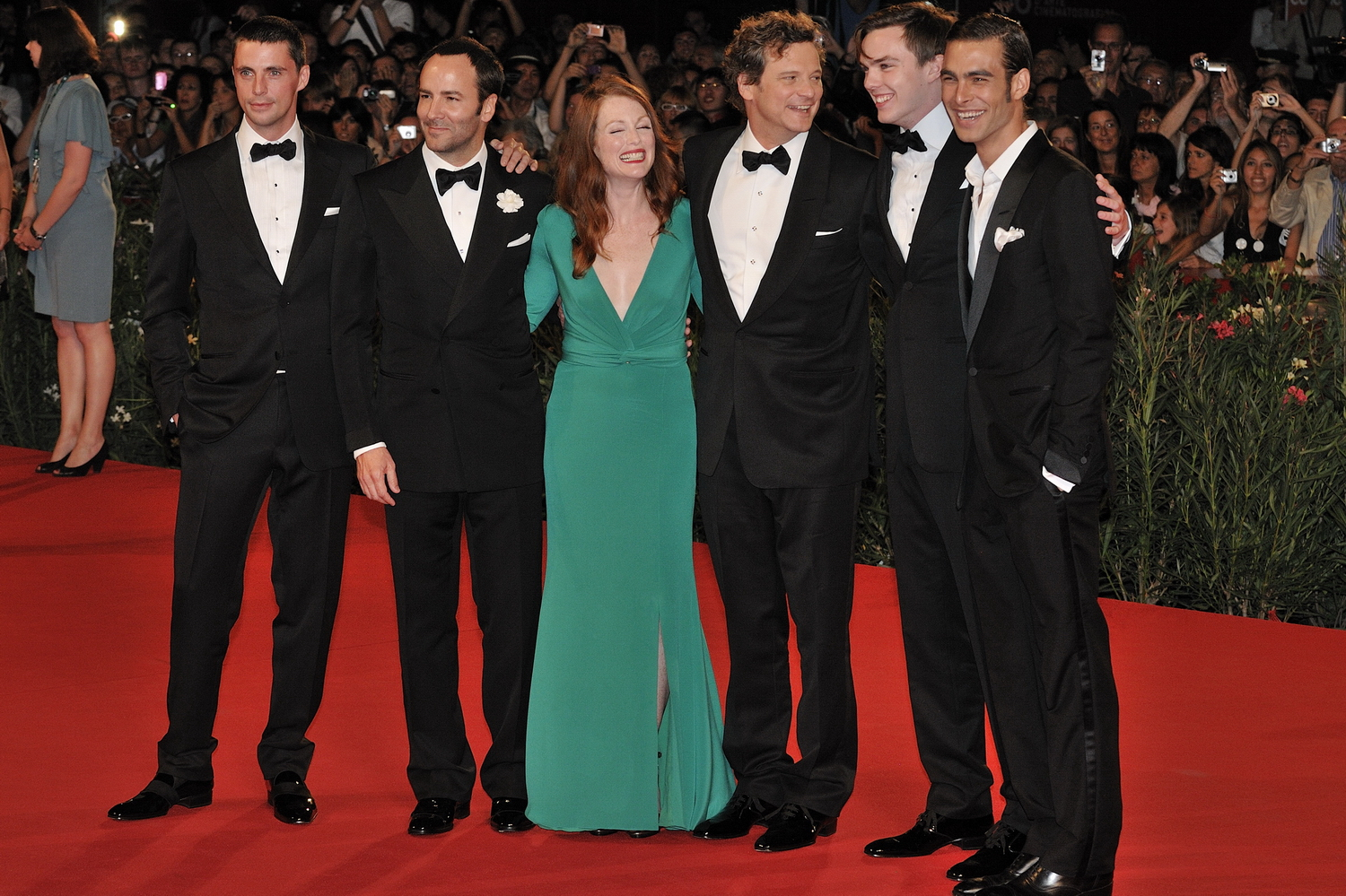
Ford at the 66th Venice Film Festival, with A Single Man's Julianne Moore and Colin Firth, 2009

In March 2005, Ford announced the launch of his film production company, Fade to Black. In 2009 he made his directorial debut with A Single Man, based on the novel of the same name by Christopher Isherwood. The drama stars Colin Firth as an LA-based college professor who is gay, alongside Julianne Moore, Nicholas Hoult and Matthew Goode. The novel was adapted by David Scearce and Ford, with Ford also being a producer.

A Single Man premiered on September 11, 2009, at the 66th Venice International Film Festival, where it was nominated for top award the Golden Lion. Colin Firth was awarded the Volpi Cup as Best Actor for his performance. He won a BAFTA Award for Best Actor in a Leading Role, and was nominated for an Academy Award, Golden Globe, Independent Spirit Award and Screen Actors Guild Award. The film won AFI Film of the Year and the GLAAD Media Award for Outstanding Film – Wide Release. Other nominations for the film included two further Golden Globe categories: Julianne Moore for Best Supporting Actress, and Abel Korzeniowski for Best Original Score. At the Independent Spirit Awards, the film was nominated for Best First Feature and Best First Screenplay. Ford and Scearce also received a nomination for Best Adapted Screenplay at the Broadcast Film Critics Association Awards.

In 2015, Ford became attached to direct Nocturnal Animals, an adaptation of the Austin Wright novel Tony and Susan. The film was released in 2016. Jake Gyllenhaal and Amy Adams played the lead roles of Tony and Susan, and Michael Shannon, Armie Hammer, Aaron Taylor-Johnson, and Isla Fisher co-starred. The film received praise from critics, as well as winning the Grand Jury Prize at the Venice Film Festival. The film has an approval rating of 74% on Rotten Tomatoes, based on 302 reviews, with an average rating of 7.1/10, and the site's critical consensus reading: "Well-acted and lovely to look at, Nocturnal Animals further underscores writer-director Tom Ford's distinctive visual and narrative skill."

In 2025, Ford was announced to direct, write, and produce an adaptation of the Anne Rice novel Cry to Heaven. It began pre-production in November 2025 and entered principal photography in January 2026. The film stars an ensemble cast of Nicholas Hoult, Aaron Taylor-Johnson, Adele (in her acting debut), Ciarán Hinds, George MacKay, Mark Strong, Colin Firth, Paul Bettany, Owen Cooper, Hunter Schafer, Thandiwe Newton, Théodore Pellerin, Daryl McCormack, Cassian Bilton, and Lux Pascal.

== Political views and activism ==
Ford is a supporter of the Democratic Party. He opposed the 2003 invasion of Iraq, stating that it made him feel "ashamed to be an American". His comment drew public criticism within America. He hosted a fundraiser for Barack Obama in 2012 and voted for Hillary Clinton in 2016.

Ford maintains a policy of refusing to dress politicians regardless of their party or views. He said of his decision, "I think that whoever is the President, or the First Lady, should be wearing clothes at a price point that are accessible to most Americans, and wearing clothes made in America. My clothes are made in Italy [and] they're very, very expensive. I don't think most women or men in our country can relate to that, and I think the First Lady or the President should represent all people."

Ford has advocated for federal recognition of same-sex marriage in the United States. In a 2009 interview, he said he preferred the term "civil partnership" for both opposite-sex and same-sex partnerships, and to leave "marriage" to religion to decide.

Ford considers "obsession with political correctness" as something which negatively impacts modern fashion designers. He said, "Cancel culture inhibits design because rather than feeling free, the tendency is to start locked into a set of rules. Everything is now considered appropriation. We used to be able to celebrate other cultures. Now you can't do that."

== Public image and legacy ==
Ford has been included in several best-dressed lists, such as International Best Dressed List, The Guardian's "The 50 best-dressed over-50s", and British GQ's "50 Best Dressed Men in Britain 2015". He was featured on the cover of the 2011 spring/summer issue of Another Man, giving his opinion on what makes the modern day gentleman. He has been called a "fashion icon" and a "style icon", and he was included in "All-TIME 100 Fashion Icons" list. He won many awards including several VH1/Vogue Fashion Awards and Council of Fashion Designers of America (CFDA) Awards. In 2014, the CFDA awarded him the Geoffrey Beene Lifetime Achievement Award.

While Ford was in a monogamous relationship for many years, he "continue[d] to promote himself with a youthful and sexually charged image". He is known for sexy clothes, making provocative statements, and creating racy advertisements. Ford's designs convey a "sophisticated sex appeal" and he has been credited for "bringing sexy back". His advertisement campaigns have drawn controversy for use of nudity and "provocative sexual imagery". Ford is also known to pose with celebrities and models in his ad campaigns. He has been called the "King of Sex" and "the straightest gay man in the world".

Ford saved Gucci from near bankruptcy and transformed it into a fashion powerhouse. His decade as the creative director was hailed as a "golden era" for Gucci. He turned the brand around, replacing the "grunge look" with "sexy, yet sophisticated, clothes". He is known for his bold designs. The New York Magazine wrote "Every season, Ford created an 'It' piece, a must-have, a season-defining trend, photographed to death, knocked off ad nauseam." Ford says it is important for designers to be contemporary and current with the changing standard of beauty.

In 2004, Ford published an eponymous monograph, detailing his early career and his design work for Gucci and Yves Saint Laurent from 1990 to 2004. In 2021, seventeen years later, Ford published a follow-up volume entitled Tom Ford 002, which described his career from 2005 including the creation of his own fashion label and the production of his two films. Both books are published by Rizzoli International Publications and co-authored by fashion journalist Bridget Foley, with forewords by Anna Wintour.

== In popular culture ==
In September 2013, rapper Jay-Z released the song "Tom Ford". Ford responded favorably to the song: "Who would not be flattered to have an entire Jay-Z track named after them? I mean [...] it's pretty rare that something like that happens. It's a kind of validation of one's work, as it means that one has really penetrated and made an impact on popular culture." The song was nominated for the Grammy Award for Best Rap Performance in 2014. Also in 2013, Ford was mentioned in the song "Suit & Tie" by Justin Timberlake featuring Jay-Z. He created the suits, shirts, and accessories for the Grammy-winning music video.

In Ridley Scott's 2021 film House of Gucci, Ford was portrayed by Reeve Carney.

== Personal life ==
Ford is openly gay. He met and began dating journalist Richard Buckley in 1986 and they married in 2014. Their son was born via gestational surrogate in September 2012. Buckley died after a long illness on September 19, 2021, at the age of 73. The family had split their time primarily between homes in Italy and London, with other residences in New York City, Los Angeles, and Santa Fe. Their pet Smooth Fox Terriers have appeared on the fashion runway and in Ford's film A Single Man.

Ford's residence in Santa Fe, Cerro Pelon Ranch, is a 24,000-acre private tract designed by Japanese architect Tadao Ando and constructed for Ford. It has additional structures that were designed by Marmol Radziner and features a fictional town known as Silverado, used as a filming location for Westerns. In 2024, Ford purchased a mansion in the Chelsea district of London for £80 million (approximately $104 million), making it the UK's most expensive residential real estate transaction of the year. His real estate portfolio is valued at over $300 million and includes properties such as the Hamptons estate once owned by Jacqueline Kennedy Onassis and a Palm Beach mansion.

In 2020, Ford told Vogue that he had become a vegan after watching the 2017 documentary What the Health. He has also been teetotal since 2019 and has openly discussed using fillers and Botox.

Ford has said in multiple interviews that artist Ian Falconer was his first lover and that he and Falconer remained good friends until Falconer's death in 2023; decades after their breakup, Ford lent Falconer's surname to the title character of his film A Single Man.

== Awards and nominations ==
Ford has been recognized by important design and cultural councils worldwide, including the Cooper Hewitt Design Museum and Time.

- 1995: International Award – Council of Fashion Designers of America (CFDA)
- 1997: People Magazine's 50 Most Beautiful People
- 1999: Style Icon Award – Elle Style Awards UK
- 2000: Best International Designer – VH1/Vogue Awards
- 2000: Fashion Editors Club of Japan Award
- 2000: British GQ International Man of the Year Award
- 2000: Superstar Award – Fashion Group International
- 2001: Womenswear Designer of the Year – CFDA
- 2001: Best Fashion Designer – Time Magazine
- 2001: Designer of the Year – GQ USA
- 2002: Accessory Designer of the Year Award for Yves Saint-Laurent – CFDA
- 2003: Fashion Design Achievement Award – Cooper-Hewitt Design Museum's National Design Awards
- 2004: board of directors Special Tribute – CFDA
- 2004: Rodeo Drive Walk of Style Award
- 2004: International Best Dressed List Hall of Fame
- 2005: André Leon Talley Lifetime Achievement Award – Savannah College of Art & Design
- 2006: Accessory Brand Launch – Accessories Council Excellence Awards
- 2007: GLAAD Media Awards – Vito Russo Award
- 2007: DNR's Person of the Year
- 2008: Menswear Designer of the Year – CFDA
- 2009: Venice Film Festival – Golden Lion for A Single Man (nominee)
- 2009: Venice Film Festival – Queer Lion for A Single Man
- 2009: Critics' Choice Awards – Best Adapted Screenplay for A Single Man (nominee)
- 2009: Independent Spirit Awards – Best First Screenplay for A Single Man (nominee)
- 2009: Independent Spirit Awards – Best First Feature for A Single Man (nominee)
- 2009: Honored as one of GQ USA's Men of the Year
- 2009: GQ Germany Man of the Year
- 2010: GLAAD Media Awards – Outstanding Film Wide Release for A Single Man
- 2010: Menswear Designer of the Year – CFDA (nominee)
- 2012: All-TIME 100 Fashion Icons – Member
- 2013: Named one of the 50 best-dressed over 50s by The Guardian.
- 2014: Geoffrey Beene Lifetime Achievement Award – CFDA
- 2015: Menswear Designer of the Year – CFDA
- 2015: Named in British GQ's 50 best-dressed men in Britain
- 2016: Venice Film Festival – Grand Jury Prize for Nocturnal Animals
- 2016: Satellite Auteur Award

== Filmography ==
Year	Title	Director	Producer	Writer
2009	A Single Man	Yes	Yes	Yes
2016	Nocturnal Animals	Yes	Yes	Yes
TBA	Cry to Heaven	Yes	Yes	Yes

=== Appearances as himself ===
- Zoolander (2001)
- Victoria Beckham (2025) (documentary miniseries)

== Bibliography ==
- Ford, Tom (2004). Tom Ford. Foreword by Anna Wintour, introduction by Graydon Carter, and interview and text by Bridget Foley. London: Thames & Hudson. ISBN 0500511977. OCLC 62795301.
- Mentana, Umberto (2020). Tom Ford. Percorsi di Moda e Cinema, dal Fashion Universe a Nocturnal Animals. Introduction by Tony Di Corcia. Italy: NPE. ISBN 9788836270026.
