= Richard Buckley =

Richard Buckley may refer to:

- Lord Buckley (Richard Myrle Buckley, 1906–1960), American stage performer
- Richard Buckley (journalist) (1948–2021), American LGBT writer and journalist and husband of Tom Ford
- Richard Buckley (courtier) (1928–2022), Royal Navy officer and courtier
- Richard Buckley, New Zealand farmer whose trousers exploded
- Dick Buckley (baseball) (Richard D. Buckley) (1858–1929), American Major League Baseball player
