= Bernheimer Gardens =

Former sculpture garden in California

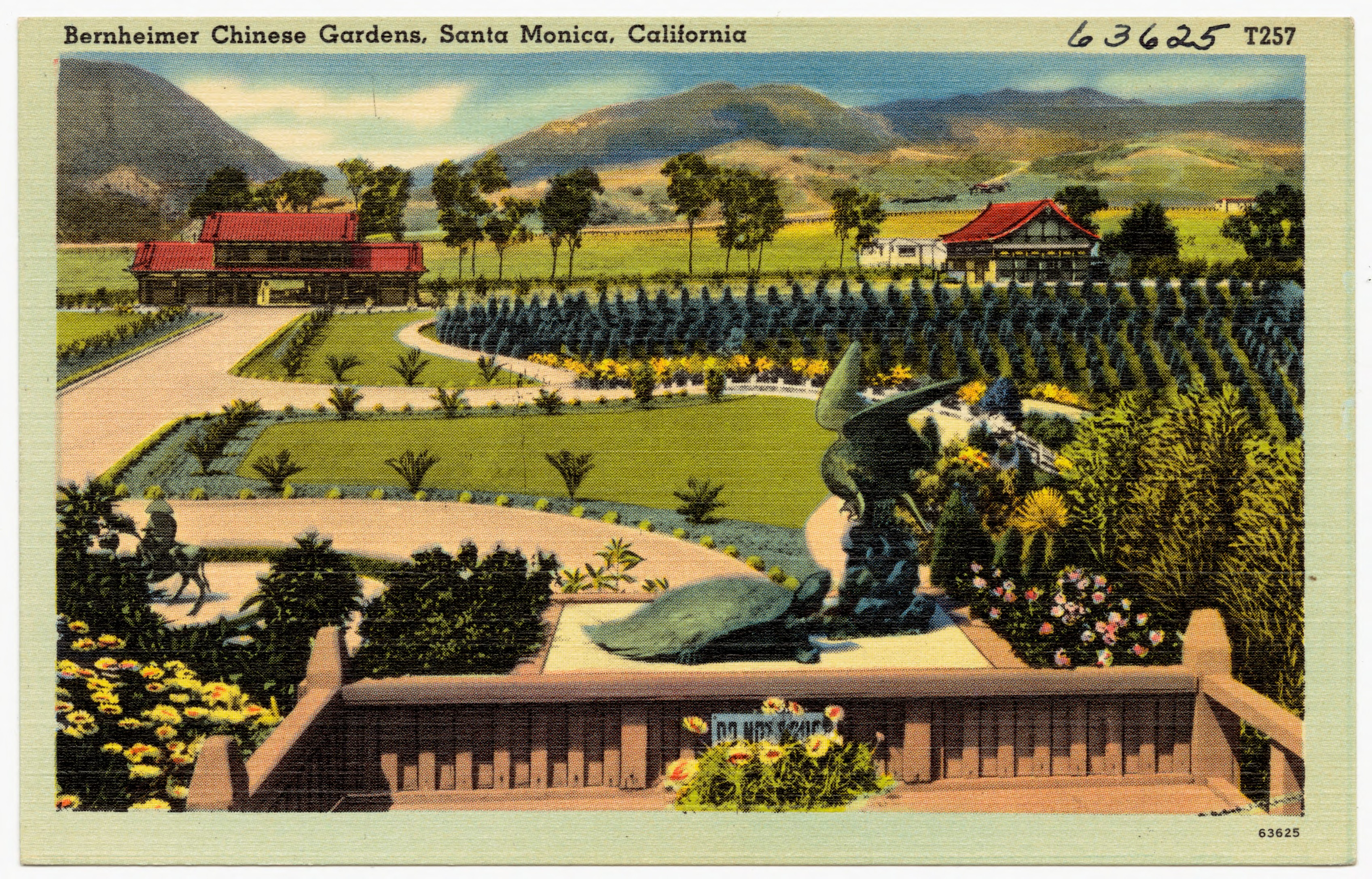
- Bernheimer Chinese Gardens pictured on a Tichnor Brothers linen-era postcard
- Interactive map of Bernheimer Gardens
- Location: 16980 Sunset Blvd., Los Angeles, CA
- Coordinates: 34.0418°N 118.5485°W
- Opened: 1928
- Closed: 1944

The Bernheimer Gardens were 8-acre (350,000 ft^{2}; 32,000 m^{2}; 3.2 ha) 20th-century formal gardens in California in the United States that showcased a private collection of bronze statues from Asia.

The gardens were open to the public at (corner of Marquez Street) in Pacific Palisades, Los Angeles, below what is now the Sunset Highlands neighborhood, from 1928 until 1944. The gardens also featured Asian-influenced plantings and tea houses, presumably chashitsu. They were sometimes called the Bernheimer Chinese Gardens or the Bernheimer Oriental Gardens; surviving photos of the buildings show a strong Japanese design influence.

In 1936, it was reported that some US$3,000,000 (equivalent to about $69,604,320 in 2025) had been invested in the gardens. The Bernheimer Gardens were known for their annual begonia show. A landslide below the gardens closed "Roosevelt Highway" (now called the Pacific Coast Highway) in 1944. This was the first of a series of "devastating landslides" that destroyed the gardens, leading to their closure. The founder of the gardens, Adolph B. Bernheimer, died at the same time as the landslides began and the gardens deteriorated until, by 1951, there was no sign of them left.

The same family had an estate in Hollywood at what is now Yamashiro Restaurant.
