= Nocturnal Animals =

2016 film by Tom Ford

- Theatrical release poster
- Directed by: Tom Ford
- Screenplay by: Tom Ford
- Based on: Tony and Susan by Austin Wright
- Produced by: Tom Ford; Robert Salerno
- Starring: Amy Adams; Jake Gyllenhaal; Michael Shannon; Aaron Taylor-Johnson; Isla Fisher; Ellie Bamber; Armie Hammer; Karl Glusman; Laura Linney; Andrea Riseborough; Michael Sheen
- Cinematography: Seamus McGarvey
- Edited by: Joan Sobel
- Music by: Abel Korzeniowski
- Production companies: Fade to Black Productions; Artina Films
- Distributed by: Focus Features (United States); Universal Pictures (International)
- Release dates: September 2, 2016 (Venice); November 18, 2016 (United States)
- Running time: 116 minutes
- Country: United States
- Language: English
- Budget: $22.5 million
- Box office: $32.4 million

Nocturnal Animals is a 2016 American neo-noir psychological thriller film written, produced, and directed by Tom Ford in his second feature, based on the 1993 novel Tony and Susan by Austin Wright. The film features a large ensemble cast, led by Amy Adams and Jake Gyllenhaal with a supporting cast, that includes Michael Shannon, Aaron Taylor-Johnson, Isla Fisher, Ellie Bamber, Armie Hammer, Karl Glusman, Laura Linney, Andrea Riseborough, and Michael Sheen. The plot follows an art gallery owner as she reads the new novel written by her first husband and begins to see the similarities between it and their former relationship.

Principal photography began in Los Angeles on October 5, 2015. The film premiered at the 73rd Venice International Film Festival main competition on September 2, 2016, where it won the Grand Jury Prize.

Nocturnal Animals was released in North America on November 18, 2016, by Focus Features. It received positive reviews, with praise for the performances and Ford's direction, and grossed over $32 million worldwide. Shannon earned a nomination for Best Supporting Actor at the 89th Academy Awards. It also received nine BAFTA Award nominations and Golden Globe Award nominations for Best Director and Best Screenplay, plus a Best Supporting Actor win for Aaron Taylor-Johnson.

== Plot ==
Susan Morrow owns an upscale Los Angeles art gallery. Her current show involves a presentation of obese majorettes dancing vigorously while naked. Susan receives a manuscript for a novel written by her estranged ex-husband, Edward Sheffield, whom she has not seen or communicated with in almost twenty years. Upset by her deteriorating marriage to unfaithful businessman Hutton Morrow, Susan becomes consumed by the novel, which is dedicated to her and named Nocturnal Animals, after Edward's nickname for her.

In this novel, Tony Hastings is a family man who runs afoul of three local troublemakers – Ray Marcus, Lou and Turk – during a road trip through West Texas. After being forced off the road, Tony is powerless to stop Ray and Turk from kidnapping his wife, Laura, and their daughter, India; leaving him with Lou, who forces him to drive Ray's car to the end of a road where he is abandoned. Tony manages to evade Ray and Lou when they return looking for him and makes his way to a nearby farmhouse to call the police.

Detective Roberto "Bobby" Andes is assigned to the case and with Tony, discovers the naked bodies of Laura and India near an abandoned shack, where they had been raped and murdered. Tony is wracked with guilt. He is contacted by Andes a year later and is asked to identify Lou, who was caught in a botched robbery and is charged as an accomplice in Laura and India's murders.

Turk has been fatally shot in the same robbery, leaving Ray as the last culprit to be brought to justice. Andes arrests Ray but is forced to release him as they have only circumstantial evidence of his involvement. On the verge of being pushed out and having been diagnosed with terminal lung cancer, Andes says he has little to lose and asks Tony if he is willing to skirt procedure to see justice done. Tony agrees and helps him abduct Ray and Lou. Andes shoots Lou dead when he attempts to flee, but Ray escapes.

Tony tracks down Ray to the shack where Laura and India were killed. Ray admits to raping and murdering Tony's wife and daughter, calling him weak. Tony fatally shoots him but is blinded when Ray hits him on the head with a fire poker. Tony stumbles outside, shoots himself in the abdomen after falling on his gun, and dies.

Shocked yet awed by the dark content and raw emotion of the novel, Susan reminisces about meeting Edward in college and their blossoming relationship, which Susan's domineering mother Anne Sutton objected to, claiming that Edward was not worthy of Susan's affections and that because of his romantic world view, he lacked the drive to achieve his goals; Susan ignored her mother's objections, eventually marrying Edward.

Susan resumes her reading of the manuscript, beginning to recall her troubled marriage to Edward, which was strained by her frustration with his fledgling career and her dismissive attitude towards his literary aspirations. Edward still loves her and attempts to repair their relationship, but Susan is already involved with Hutton and divorces Edward. She chooses to abort her pregnancy with Edward's child to ensure her marriage to Hutton could not be held back.

In the present day, Susan finishes reading the novel and arranges a meeting with Edward at a restaurant; however, Edward does not show up, and Susan is left waiting alone for hours as the restaurant empties.

== Cast ==
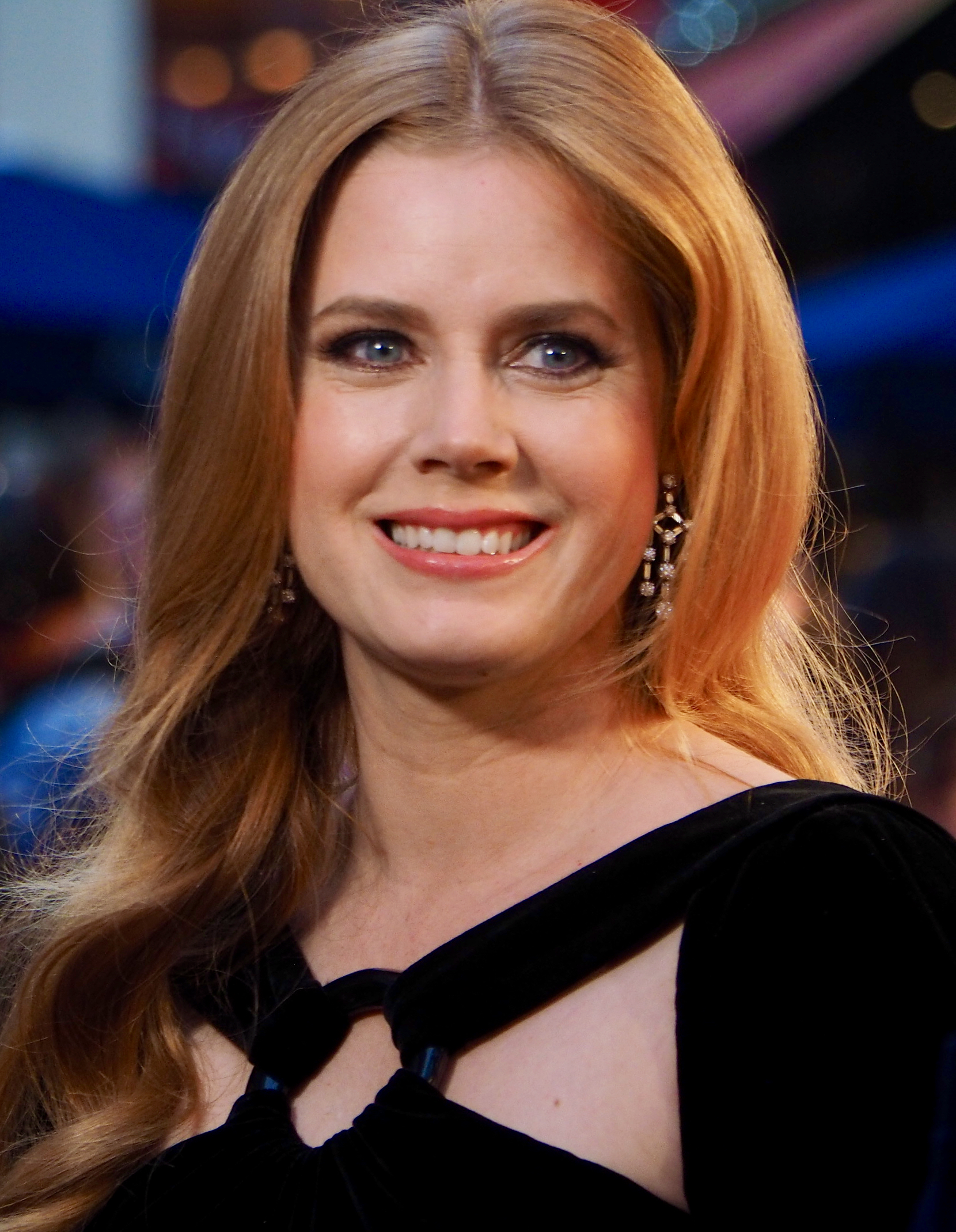
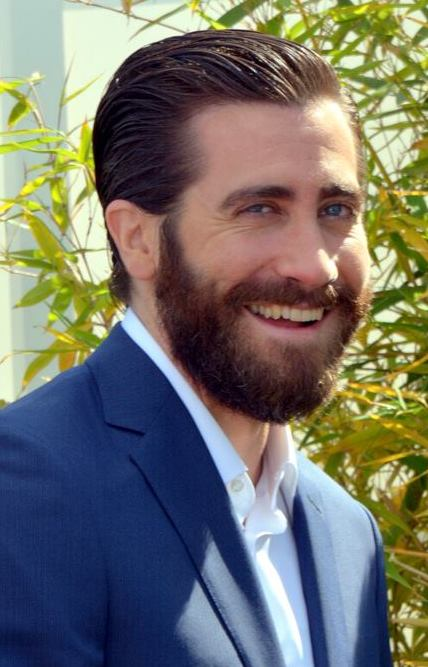
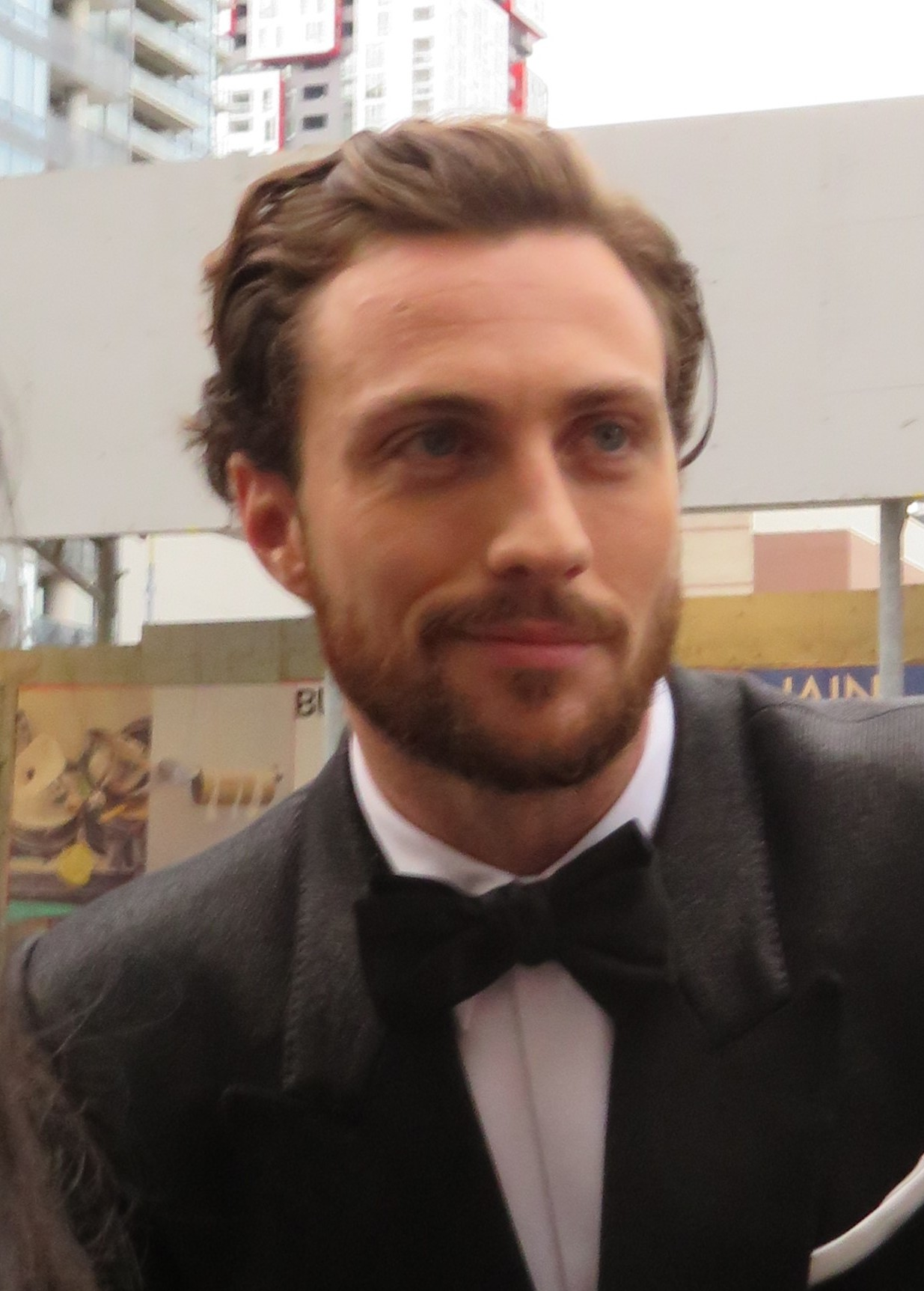
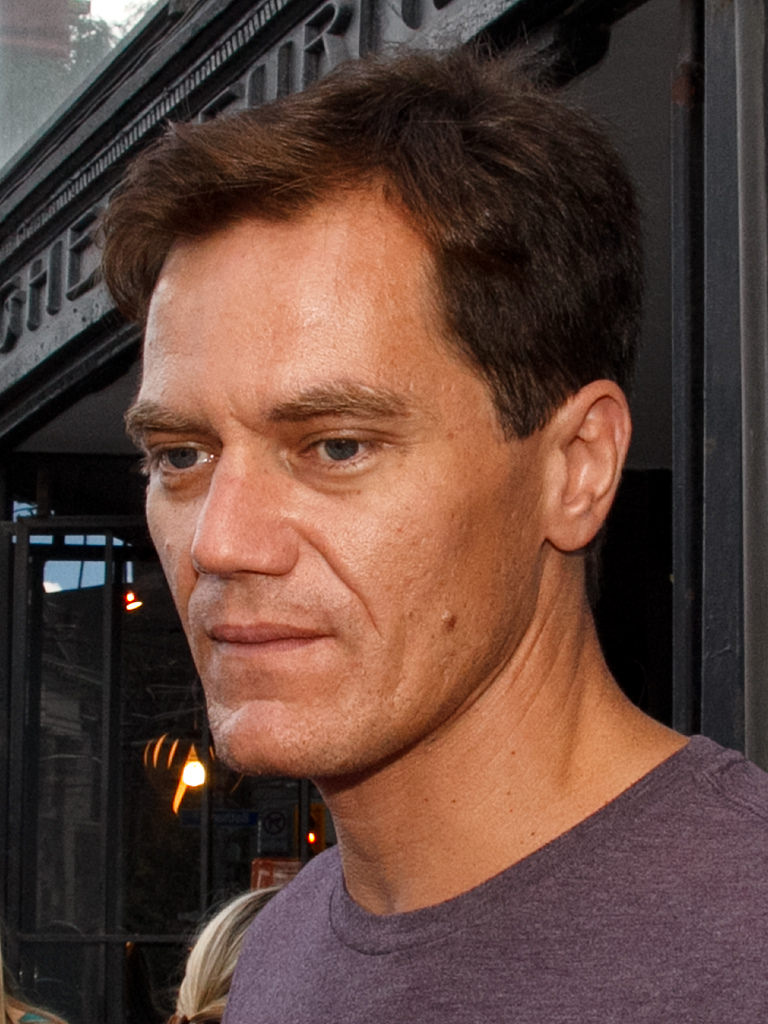
(Clockwise) Nocturnal Animals stars Amy Adams, Jake Gyllenhaal, Michael Shannon, and Aaron Taylor-Johnson

=== The real world ===
- Amy Adams as Susan Morrow, a wealthy art gallery owner living in Los Angeles
- Jake Gyllenhaal as Edward Sheffield, Susan's estranged ex-husband and novelist
- Armie Hammer as Hutton Morrow, Susan's second husband, who has been neglectful towards her
- Laura Linney as Anne Sutton, Susan's estranged mother
- Andrea Riseborough as Alessia Holt, Carlos' wife
- Michael Sheen as Carlos Holt, Alessia's gay husband
- Bobbi Menuez (credited as India Menuez) as Samantha Morrow, Susan's daughter
- Zawe Ashton as Alex, a receptionist
- Jena Malone as Sage Ross, Susan's young coworker
- Neil Jackson as Christopher, Susan's attendant
- Kristin Bauer van Straten as Samantha Van Helsing

=== The novel ===
- Jake Gyllenhaal as Tony Hastings, a motorist on vacation with his family who is forced off the road by Ray Marcus' gang
- Michael Shannon as Detective Bobby Andes, a dedicated detective for a local police department
- Aaron Taylor-Johnson as Ray Marcus, the sadistic leader of the gang
- Isla Fisher as Laura Hastings, Tony's wife, who is kidnapped by Ray Marcus' gang
- Ellie Bamber as India Hastings, Tony's daughter, who is also kidnapped alongside her mother
- Karl Glusman as Lou Bates, gang member
- Robert Aramayo as Steve "Turk" Adams, gang member
- Graham Beckel as Lieutenant Graves

== Production ==
=== Development and casting ===
On March 24, 2015, it was announced that Smokehouse Pictures' partners George Clooney and Grant Heslov would produce a thriller, Nocturnal Animals, based on Austin Wright's 1993 novel Tony and Susan. Tom Ford was set to direct the film, based on his own script. Ford said that the storytelling concept of the novel appealed to him, explaining, "The film is very different than the book it's based on. However, the central themes are the same, meaning that when I read the book, what appealed to me as a writer and a filmmaker was the idea of this device of communicating to someone through a work of fiction. Through a written work of fiction. And thereby communicating something that they had not been able to really communicate clearly. I loved that concept."

Jake Gyllenhaal was set to star in the dual lead roles, Amy Adams was in talks for the female lead role, and sources confirmed that Joaquin Phoenix and Aaron Taylor-Johnson might be cast in other roles. Focus Features acquired the US distribution rights to the film on May 17, 2015, while Universal Pictures would handle the international distribution. Focus' deal was made with $20 million, making this the biggest deal of the 2015 Cannes Film Festival, and one of the biggest of the mid-2010s. On August 6, 2015, Taylor-Johnson was confirmed to play a mysterious character who poses a threat to Gyllenhaal's character Tony's family, while Michael Shannon was also added to the cast, playing a detective investigating the violent incident. On August 28, 2015, Armie Hammer also joined the cast of the film, to play Hutton Morrow, Adams' character's husband. On September 9, 2015, Isla Fisher joined the film to play Laura Hastings, Tony's wife. On September 18, 2015, Ellie Bamber was cast in the film to play Tony's daughter. On September 30, 2015, Robert Aramayo was added to the cast. On October 5, 2015, Karl Glusman signed on to star in the film. On October 8, 2015, Peter Nyong'o was also cast in the film.

=== Filming ===
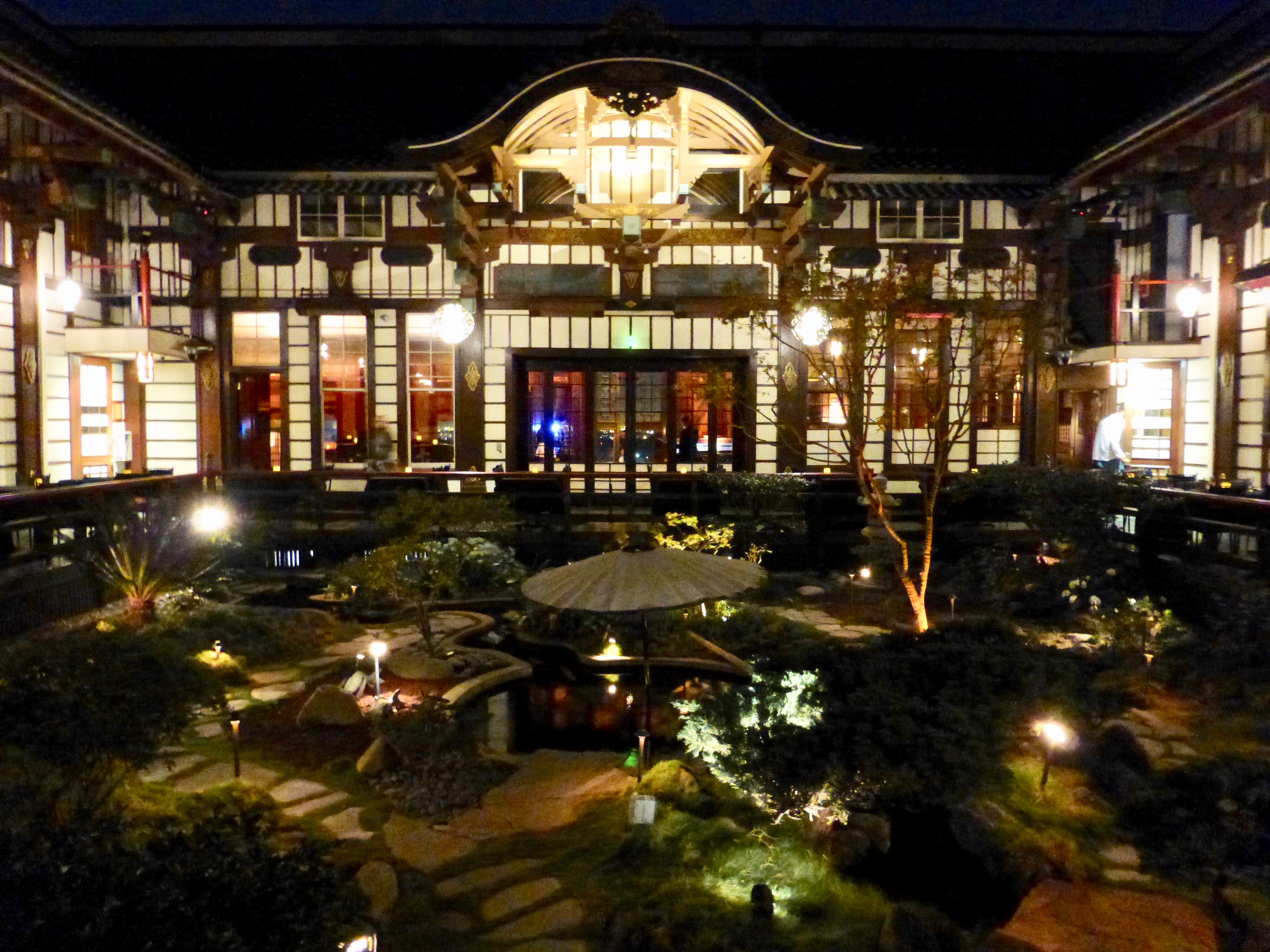
The final scene at the restaurant took place in the Yamashiro Historic District

Principal photography began in Los Angeles on October 5, 2015. The final scene in the Japanese restaurant was filmed in the main building of the Yamashiro Historic District. Filming wrapped on December 5, 2015.

== Release and reception ==
Nocturnal Animals had its world premiere at the 73rd Venice International Film Festival on September 2, 2016, where it won the Grand Jury Prize. The film also screened at the Toronto International Film Festival on September 9, 2016, and at the BFI London Film Festival on October 14, 2016.

The film was released in the United States on November 18, 2016.

=== Box office ===
Nocturnal Animals grossed $10.7 million in the United States and Canada and $21.7 million in other countries for a worldwide total of $32.4 million.

The film had its North American wide release on December 9, 2016, and was projected to open to $3–5 million. It ended up grossing $3.2 million, finishing 7th at the box office.

=== Critical response ===
On the review aggregator website Rotten Tomatoes, 74% of 299 critics' reviews are positive, with an average rating of 7.0/10. The website's consensus reads: "Well-acted and lovely to look at, Nocturnal Animals further underscores writer-director Tom Ford's distinctive visual and narrative skill." Metacritic, which uses a weighted average, assigned the film a score of 67 out of 100, based on 45 critics, indicating "generally favorable" reviews.

Owen Gleiberman of Variety praised the film, stating "Tom Ford's first film since A Single Man is another winner", and complimenting the performances of Gyllenhaal, Adams, Shannon and Taylor-Johnson. Pete Hammond of Deadline Hollywood praised Adams, Gyllenhaal, Shannon, and Taylor-Johnson's performances, as well as Ford's screenplay and direction. Geoffrey Macnab of The Independent awarded the film five stars, praising the performances and the direction, and stating, "Nocturnal Animals is extraordinarily deft in the way it combines romanticism and bleakness. It's a film that easily could have slipped into extreme pretentiousness but it never puts a foot wrong."

Leonard Maltin wrote very positively of the film: "At one time it was normal to tell a story from beginning to end; now, juggling a movie's timeline has almost become a cliché. Yet in his second film, Tom Ford has not only mastered a tricky narrative but establishes two separate, completely tangible environments. What's more, he maintains a consistent tone for both facets of this seductive story. This movie represents a daring walk on the high wire by a man who has more than proven himself as a filmmaker. It's not just an accomplished piece of work but a movie that completely envelops its audience. That's no mean feat." Maltin also singled out Michael Shannon as giving "another great performance."

Writing for Rolling Stone, Peter Travers rated the film 31/2-stars-out-of-4 and stated: "Tom Ford hits it out of the park with a stunning film noir that resonates with ghostly, poetic terror. Don't overthink what Ford has so cunningly crafted. Surrender to it. Cheers to cinematographer Seamus McGarvey, composer Abel Korzeniowski and especially editor Joan Sobel who help Ford weave multiple stories into one darkly funny, visually dazzling piece." Travers also singled out the performances of the cast: "The actors could not be better. Gyllenhaal, in two roles, dives deep into the wells of perceived masculine weakness. And Adams takes Susan from dewy college girl to hardened ice queen without missing a stop or a nuance in between. She's spectacular."

Victoria Coren Mitchell of The Guardian opposed the popular critical opinion, saying "Why all these raves and prizes for a piece of gynophobic death-porn?"

== See also ==
- Fragile masculinity
