= Yamashiro Historic District =

Villa, restaurant, and gardens in Los Angeles, California

- U.S. National Register of Historic Places
- U.S. Historic district
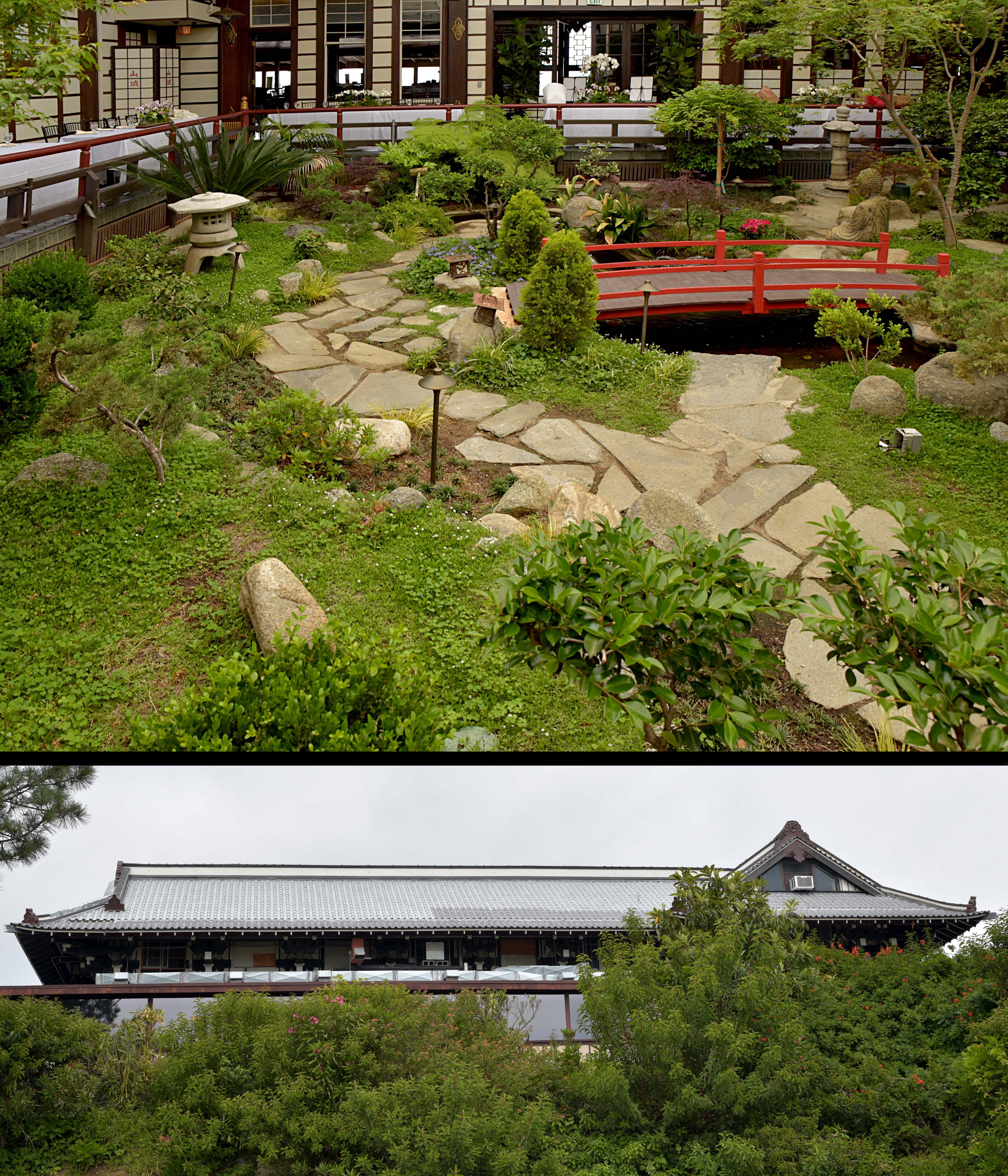
- Yamashiro Restaurant inside (top) and Outside (bottom)

- Location within the Los Angeles metropolitan area
- Location: 1999 N. Sycamore Ave, Los Angeles, California
- Coordinates: 34.1058°N 118.3421°W
- Architect: Franklin M. Small
- Website: yamashirohollywood.com
- NRHP reference No.: 12000811
- Added to NRHP: September 25, 2012

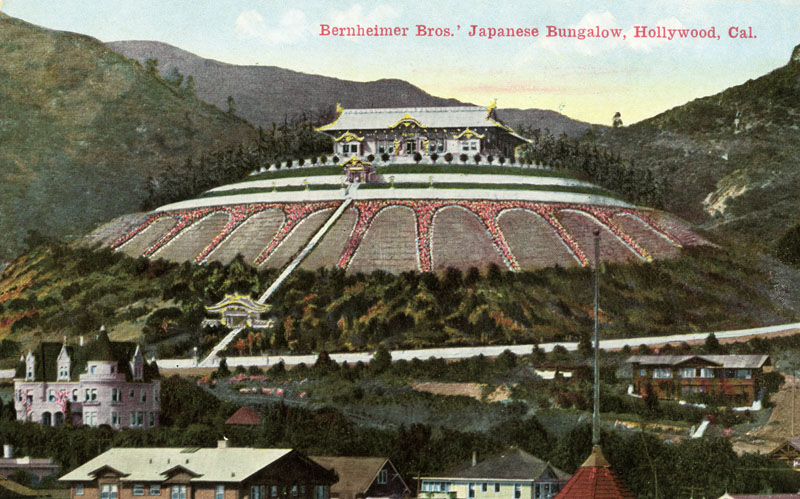
Yamashiro in Hollywood, depicted on a postcard from c. 1914.

The Yamashiro Historic District is located on Sycamore Avenue in the Hollywood Hills of Los Angeles, California, United States.

The villa that forms the district's centerpiece was constructed from 1911 to 1914 by artisans and craftsmen from Japan for the German-American Adolph Leopold Bernheimer (1866-1944) and Eugene Elija Bernheimer (1865-1924) [noted as brothers to Charles L. Bernheimer] to house their collection of Japanese art and valuable items. Mainly acquired in Japan and China, their collection comprised ukiyo-e prints, silk paintings, Buddhist sculptures and wall paintings, wood carvings, jades, bronze sculptures, furniture, and “Oriental” goods. The establishment was called the Yamashiro Hollywood, but can also be known as the Bernheimer Villa and Oriental Gardens. As the villa was located on top of a hill, it was called a yamashiro, a Japanese word that in this case means "mountain castle" (山城). The district consists of the villa, several smaller buildings (of which a number no longer exist), and landscaped gardens. The area was placed on the National Register of Historic Places in 2012.

Today, the villa houses an Asian restaurant.

== History ==
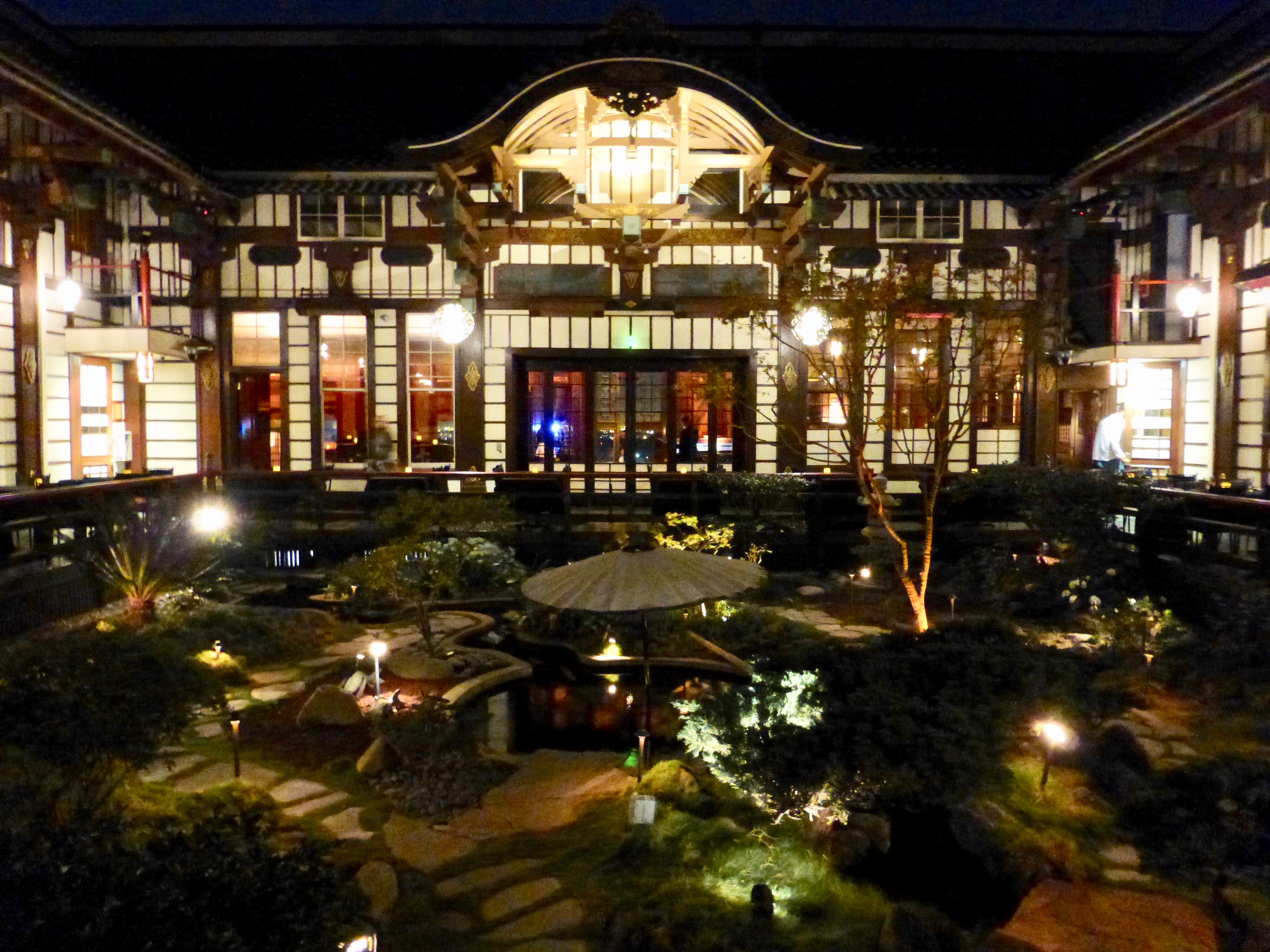
The Yamashiro interior courtyard.

While the Bernheimer brothers made a high investment to create the site to store their Japanese antiques, estimating to be around $2 million, most of the Bernheimers’ art collection was auctioned off in the beginning of the 1920s, toward the end of their lives. During this memorable time period, labelled as the Roaring Twenties, the Yamashiro Hollywood gained its greatest popularity as it transformed into a hub for the movie industry's most elite members, the 400 Club. Unfortunately, its fame was short-lived due to the Great Depression and upcoming Second World War. Toward the end of the 1920s, the economy crashed and forced the brothers to open it up to the public, giving residents tours to make ends meet. As the United States retaliated with the bombing of Hiroshima and Nagasaki after the Pearl Harbor incident, Americans throughout the nation altered their opinion of the Japanese-cultured base in the rise of an Anti-Japanese campaign. At this time, many believed that the Yamashiro was a Japanese signal tower and vandalized the establishment as a result. To mask its remaining native design from future attacks, it disguised itself as a boys' military school then an apartment complex at the end of the war.

In 1948, landlord Thomas O. Glover bought the property with the intention to renovate the palace to create a hotel and modernized apartments. However, by uncovering the elegantly carved wood and silk wallpaper, he reconsidered and aimed to restore the Yamashiro to its original state. From there, he and his son, Thomas Y. Glover, began the evolution of the Yamashiro Restaurant, utilizing the leftover rooms in the estate to occupy up to 500 guests. In addition to opening a Pagoda Bar and seasonal Farmers Market, the place strives to preserve the Japanese culture and history through its dishes along with the scenery of the Los Angeles skyline.

In 2024, the property went up for sale for $100 million.

== Location ==
1923 aerial photograph by Albert William Stevens, also showing the Magic Castle at bottom center

It was used as a filming location in a number of movies, such as Breezy (1973), Blind Date (1987), Gone in 60 Seconds (2000), Kill Bill (2003), Memoirs of a Geisha (2005), Nocturnal Animals (2016), Playing God (1997), The Teahouse of the August Moon (1956), Sayonara (1957), and The Vermilion Pencil (1922).

It has also made an appearance in many television shows in the 1950s and 1960s including: My Three Sons, I Spy (either the 1955 series or the 1965 series), Route 66, and Perry Mason.

Furthermore, it has been a setting for various Hollywood movie premieres like Rush Hour, Third Rock from the Sun, and Lethal Weapon 4, as well as for countless formal events, parties, commercials, and photoshoots.

The district is featured in Visiting... with Huell Howser Episode 938.

== See also ==
- Bernheimer Gardens (built by the same family in Pacific Palisades)
- Japonisme
- Anglo-Japanese style
