= Tony and Susan =

Book by Austin Wright

- Hardcover edition
- Author: Austin Wright
- Language: English
- Publisher: Baskerville Publishers, Grand Central Publishing
- Publication date: 1993
- Publication place: United States
- Media type: Print (hardback & paperback)
- Pages: 334 pp (first edition, hardback)
- ISBN: 1-880909-01-4 (first edition, hardback Baskerville); ISBN 978-0-44658-290-2 (Grand Central hardback)

Tony and Susan is a novel by Austin Wright first published in 1993. The book was initially published by Baskerville Publishers, a small press, after having been turned down by 11 major New York publishers. The book was a critical success and went into two editions with sale to Book-of-the-Month Club as "Talk of the Office," and translation into 13 languages. Movie rights were optioned to Universal Studios and later to HBO (though it was never made) and Warner Books (now known as Grand Central Publishing) took the paperback rights for $400,000 in a two-day auction. Tony and Susan was Warner's lead paperback fiction in September 1994. It was thought at the time that the paperback edition did not sell well because the book was too literary to be a mass-market offering. In 2010, the book was published for the first time in the UK and enjoyed a critical revival causing it to be reprinted in the United States.

The novel was adapted into a screenplay by Tom Ford and developed into the 2016 film Nocturnal Animals, directed by Ford, which was released to positive reception. Following the adaptation, the book was again republished, with a new cover and the updated title of Nocturnal Animals, corresponding with the film's release.

== Plot ==
In 1990, Susan Morrow is surprised to hear from her ex-husband, Edward, who sends her a manuscript to his novel, Nocturnal Animals. Susan and Edward's relationship had fallen apart 25 years earlier in part thanks to him abandoning his studies to be a lawyer to pursue a writing career. After putting off the manuscript for months, she reads it in the course of three nights after learning that Edward will be passing through her city soon.

Nocturnal Animals is about a meek mathematician named Tony Hastings on his way to his country home in Maine with his wife, Laura, and teenage daughter, Helen. On the way, they are accosted by three men in a truck, Ray, Lou, and Turk, who begin blocking the path to their car. The cars end up bumping each other and the leader of the men, Ray, gets in the car with the Hastings and drives off with them. Ray drives Tony to a clearing and abandons him there. Tony walks to a farmhouse where he manages to call for help. In retracing his steps with the state troopers, he discovers Laura and Helen, both raped and murdered, in the clearing where he had been abandoned. He blames himself for not doing enough to save them.

For a year after the murders, Tony falls into depression. The lead detective on the case, Bobby Andes, calls him in to identify a possible suspect, but when Tony cannot positively identify a man who turns out to be Turk, Andes seems to lose interest in the case. Sometime later, Andes again calls Tony to I.D. a man and this time he is able to identify Lou as one of the men who murdered his wife and daughter. He learns that all three men had been involved in a robbery and that Turk was shot to death. Andes brings Tony with him to pick up and identify Ray and, after Tony makes a positive I.D., Andes takes them on a trip to the scenes of the crime. Though Ray denies any knowledge of the crime, Tony feels he is mocking him and at one point is overcome with rage and hits him in the face.

Tony at last starts to move on with his life and begins a relationship with one of his former graduate students. He receives a call from Andes telling him that Ray is about to be set free. He goes to meet Andes, who tells him he is dying of cancer. Andes then asks him if he wants to see Ray brought to justice. Sensing Tony's tacit approval, Andes arrests Ray and brings him to a remote camper in the woods where his ex-wife Ingrid is staying, unbeknownst to Andes. They are later joined by Susan, Andes' cousin. Andes goes and retrieves Lou from the jail. In the camper, Andes threatens to torture both Lou and Ray, but they run away. As a result, Andes shoots and kills Lou while urging Tony to do the same to Ray. Tony cannot bring himself to commit murder, however, and allows Ray to escape. Andes tells Tony and the women that if they are questioned they must say that Ray killed Lou.

Andes has Tony go to send a message to one of his police friends. Along the way, Tony passes Ray walking along the side of the road and later goes to the trailer where Helen and Laura had been raped. He finds Ray sleeping there. He wakes Ray up, and they have a conversation in which Ray confesses to raping and murdering Laura and Helen. Tony then shoots and kills him, but is blinded and badly wounded in the process. He stumbles out of the trailer and falls down a ravine. He hears the police coming to save him, but he does not call out to them, instead accidentally shooting himself in the gut. As he dies, he hallucinates driving to Maine with Helen and Laura.

The novel causes Susan to reminisce about her past life with Edward. They were neighbors who briefly lived together after Edward's father died and her parents took him in. They met again in college, and slept together despite Edward's puritanical views on sex. However, a short time into their relationship, Edward decided that he wanted to be a writer and that the two would survive on Susan's income as a lecturer. After Edward left for a month-long writer's retreat, Susan began an affair with their neighbor Arnold, whose wife was experiencing mental breakdowns. Sometime after Edward returned, Susan confessed all of this to Edward and eventually divorced him, settling down with Arnold and tolerating his affairs.

Susan enjoys Edward's novel and finds herself sympathizing with Tony. She decides to invite Edward over for dinner the night he is in town in order to discuss his work. Edward never calls, despite the fact that Susan leaves several messages at his hotel. The following day, having discovered he has checked out, she writes a thoughtful piece of criticism for him and then throws it away, sending him a brief note instead telling him she will give him her thoughts if he would like them.

== Main characters ==
=== Reality ===
- Susan Morrow, the main character of Tony and Susan, a forty-nine year old English professor who receives Nocturnal Animals.
- Edward Sheffield, Susan's ex-husband and author of Nocturnal Animals.
- Arnold Morrow, a successful heart surgeon and current husband of Susan Morrow.

=== Fictitious ===
- Tony Hastings, the main protagonist of Nocturnal Animals. A mathematics professor who seeks revenge for the murders of his wife and daughter.
- Lieutenant Bobby Andes, a divorced detective who helps Tony on his path of vengeance.
- Ray, Turk and Lou are the three main antagonists, the trio rape and murder Laura and Helen Hastings, wife and daughter of Tony.
  - Ray is the leader of the three, described as a balding man with bucked teeth.
  - Turk is one of Ray's henchmen.
  - Lou is Ray's other henchman, Tony successfully identifies Lou, leading to the final act of Nocturnal Animals.
- Laura Hastings, the wife of Tony and mother of Helen, who is raped and murdered by Ray, Turk, and Lou.
- Helen Hasting, Tony and Laura's daughter, who is raped and murdered alongside her mother. Their naked bodies are soon found in a clearing.

== Critical reception ==
Author Austin Wright received positive reviews for the novel. Publishers Weekly praised his "sharp prose".

The New York Times called the novel "mesmerising".

== Film adaptation ==
Fashion designer and filmmaker Tom Ford wrote and directed the 2016 adaptation of the book with Amy Adams starring as Susan Morrow, Jake Gyllenhaal as Edward Sheffield/Tony Hastings, Michael Shannon as Bobby Andes, Isla Fisher as Laura Hastings, and Aaron Taylor-Johnson as Ray. The film received positive reviews and accolades including nine BAFTA Award nominations and Golden Globe Award nominations for Best Director and Best Screenplay, in addition to Aaron Taylor-Johnson's win for Best Supporting Actor. Michael Shannon received an Academy Award nomination for Best Supporting Actor.
