= Richard Buckley (journalist) =

American Journalist (1948–2021)

- Born: August 20, 1948; Binghamton, New York, U.S.
- Died: September 19, 2021 (aged 73); Los Angeles, California, U.S.
- Occupation(s): Fashion journalist and editor
- Spouse: Tom Ford (m. 2014)
- Children: 1

Richard Buckley (August 20, 1948 – September 19, 2021) was an American fashion journalist and editor. Buckley wrote for Vogue Italia and New York magazine, and worked as an editor for Women's Wear Daily and Vanity Fair. He was editor-in-chief of Vogue Hommes from 1999 to 2005.

Buckley was born in Binghamton, New York, and was educated at the University of Maryland's Munich campus. He was the husband of designer Tom Ford; they had a son, born in 2012 via gestational surrogacy.

Buckley died at his home in Los Angeles after an extended illness on September 19, 2021, at the age of 73 (although the references below erroneously list 72 as his age at death).
