= Austin Wright =

American writer

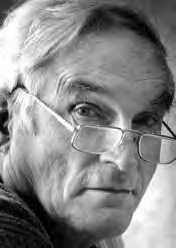
- Born: September 6, 1922; Yonkers, New York, U.S.
- Died: April 23, 2003 (aged 80); Cincinnati, Ohio, U.S.
- Occupations: Novelist; literary critic; professor; author
- Spouse: Sara Hull Wright
- Children: Katharine, Joanna, Margaret
- Relatives: John Kirtland Wright, Austin Tappan Wright, John Henry Wright, Arthur Cushman McGiffert, Mary Tappan Wright
- Writing career
- Genres: Fiction, criticism
- Notable works: Tony and Susan
- Notable awards: Whiting Award

Austin McGiffert Wright (1922 – April 23, 2003) was an American novelist, literary critic and professor emeritus of English at the University of Cincinnati.

== Life and career ==
Wright was born in Yonkers, New York. He grew up in Hastings-on-Hudson, New York, the son of the geographer John Kirtland Wright and Katharine McGiffert Wright, and namesake of his uncle, Austin Tappan Wright, writer of the utopian novel Islandia. His paternal grandparents were classical scholar John Henry Wright and novelist Mary Tappan Wright. He graduated from Harvard University in 1943. He served in the Army (1943–1946). He graduated from the University of Chicago, with a master's degree in 1948, and a Ph.D. in 1959.

He married Sara Hull Wright, in 1950. They had three children: Joanna Wright (died 2000), Katharine Wright of Berkeley, CA, and Margaret Wright, and two granddaughters, Madeline Giscombe and Elizabeth Perkins.

Austin Wright was a professor in the English Department at the University of Cincinnati for almost forty years.

Wright died in 2003 in Cincinnati. When he died, he had realized certain proceeds from the sale of movie rights to his book Tony and Susan, but he had no reason to believe that a film would actually be made. Tony and Susan was re-issued, and became a major film, Nocturnal Animals (2016).

== Awards ==
- 1985 Whiting Award

== Works ==
=== Novels ===
- Camden's Eyes Doubleday, 1969
- First Persons: A Novel. Harper & Row. 1973. ISBN 978-0-06-014759-4.
- The Morley Mythology. Harper & Row. 1977. ISBN 978-0-06-014751-8.
- Recalcitrance, Faulkner, and the Professors: A Critical Fiction. University of Iowa Press. 1990. ISBN 978-0-87745-301-7.
- Tony and Susan. Baskerville. 1993. ISBN 978-1-880909-01-0. reissue. Atlantic Books. 2010. ISBN 978-1-84887-021-5. (review )
- After Gregory: A Novel. Baskerville Publishers. 1994. ISBN 978-1-880909-12-6.
- Telling Time: A Novel. Baskerville Publishers. 1995. ISBN 978-1-880909-36-2.
- Disciples. Baskerville Publishers. 1997. ISBN 978-1-880909-55-3.

=== Non-fiction ===
- The American short story in the twenties, University of Chicago Press, 1961
- John Leeds Barroll; Austin McGiffert Wright, eds. (1969). The art of the short story: an introductory anthology. Allyn and Bacon.
- Formal Principle in the Novel. Cornell University Press. 1982. ISBN 978-0-8014-1462-6.
