= Noeline Brown =

Australian actress and comedian

Noeline Brown OAM
- Born: Noeline Mabel Brown; 3 October 1938 (age 87); Sydney, New South Wales, Australia
- Occupations: Actress, comedian
- Years active: 1957–present
- Known for: The Mavis Bramston Show; My Name's McGooley, What's Yours?; Blankety Blanks; The Naked Vicar Show
- Spouse: Tony Sattler
- Website: www.noelinebrown.com.au

Noeline Mabel Brown (sometimes credited as Noelene Brown) (born 3 October 1938) is an Australian actress and comedian. She has appeared in numerous films, television shows, theatrical productions and radio programs dating back to 1959.

== Early life ==
Brown grew up in Stanmore, a working-class suburb of Sydney, Australia. She was raised alongside her two brothers, by a mother suffering from tuberculosis. Her father, Leo, rarely home, worked with the travelling post office and was a unionist, influencing her own politics. As a young child, Brown was hospitalised for several months with Scarlet fever.

Brown was school captain in her last year at Stanmore Homescience School, but left school at age 15, as she struggled to conform with the subservient behaviour expected of her. Her first job at 15 was as a library assistant at the Marrickville Library where, through colleagues, she was introduced to a theatre group and began to learn her craft in revues and theatre restaurants.

== Career ==
=== Theatre and revue ===
By 19, Brown was appearing in small theatre productions, first performing in a Petersham Musical Society revue, before working for the New Theatre at the Waterside Workers’ Federation. She then auditioned for Sydenham's Pocket Playhouse, where she was discovered in 1962, playing a showgirl in The Sleeping Prince. She gained local notoriety in Sydney as a cast member of the Phillip Street Revues and the popular melodrama productions at The Music Hall, a Sydney theatre-restaurant, in the early 1960s.

Brown frequently appeared alongside Barry Creyton, in productions including What's New? (1962), The Face at the Window (1963), Beauty and the Beast (1963), How The West Was Lost (1964) and Double Act (1987), the latter of which, Creyton wrote in order to collaborate once again with Brown. The pair specialised in comedy improvisation, with some of their sketches being aired on radio station 2SM. From there, they were offered a contract with Festival Records, making two comedy albums. Their first album, "The Front and Backside of Barry Creyton and Noeline Brown" outsold The Beatles, The Rolling Stones and Elvis Presley, in its first week of release, but was banned on every radio station in Australia.

From 2004 to 2006, Brown was in an extended Australian touring production of Wallflowering with HIT Productions playing the part of Peg. In 2007, she appeared in Bruce Venables' and Richard Fidler's play Flying Solo, directed by Judy Nunn, starring alongside Barry Quin, Paula Duncan, Enda Markey and Jacinta John. The same year, she played Florence Foster Jenkins in Glorious!. In 2009, she co-starred once again with Barry Creyton in Peter Quilter's play Duets at the Ensemble Theatre in Sydney.

From 2014 to 2015, Brown played the role of Maggie (originated by Ruth Cracknell) in a stage reimagining of the classic Australian television sitcom Mother and Son. In 2022, Brown appeared in a production of Mono opposite Max Gillies and John Wood.

=== Television and film ===
Brown, however came to national prominence after joining the cast of the pioneering Australian satirical TV sketch comedy series The Mavis Bramston Show (1964–1968). After a stint in the UK she secured a regular role in the hit TV sitcom My Name's McGooley, What's Yours?, starring alongside Gordon Chater, John Meillon and Judi Farr.

Throughout the 1970s, Brown enjoyed great popularity in Australia as a co-star of the satirical television and radio series The Naked Vicar Show and with regular appearances as a panelist on the quiz show Blankety Blanks.

She was a regular panelist in the ABC game show Would You Believe? (1970–1974). In 1978 she won a Logie Award for the most popular NSW female personality.

In 2006, she was a competitor in the fourth season of Dancing with the Stars, hoping to win money for her chosen charity 'Starting Points', which provides early intervention for children with special needs. She had previously won a sizeable amount of money on Who Wants to Be a Millionaire? for the same charity. Together with professional dance partner Carmello, she placed fourth.

Brown has also appeared in feature films and TV movies. Her earlier career included roles in 1971 adventure survival film Walkabout alongside Jenny Agutter and David Gulpilil, and 1987 drama film Emma's War opposite Miranda Otto and Lee Remick. She played the role of Leonara Biviano in the Australian film Razzle Dazzle: A Journey into Dance in 2007.

Brown was portrayed by Jane Allsop in the 2007 television movie The King, about the life of Graham Kennedy.

== Recognition and awards ==
Brown was appointed Australia's first Ambassador for Ageing by the Rudd government.

She won the 2007 Norman Kessell Award for best performance for her portrayal of Florence Foster Jenkins in Peter Quilter's play Glorious!

In April 2020, Brown was honoured with a stamp in the Australia Post Legends of Comedy issue.

== Personal life ==
At the age of 18, Brown was engaged to "Ron", a "much older gorgeous boyfriend", with whom she is still friends. However, when she began acting at 19, she gave the ring back, as she felt she was not yet ready to settle down. Brown attracted the interest of many other admirers, including filmmaker Bruce Beresford and broadcaster Clive James, the latter admitting to envying her romance with art critic and author Robert Hughes.

Brown met writer Tony Sattler on a radio show called Chuck Chunder of the Space Patrol. They married in 1976, before working together on mid-1970s comedy sketch hit The Naked Vicar Show on which he was a writer and producer. The couple were close friends of Graham Kennedy – Brown was present when Kennedy died in 2005. She and Sattler have lived in Bowral for many years, and Kennedy moved there to be closer to them. When Kennedy's health began to fail, Sattler and Brown reportedly contacted former Nine network boss Kerry Packer to appeal for financial support to care for the ailing star (Kennedy having earned many millions of dollars for Packer and the Nine network in his heyday). Packer declined to assist Kennedy financially but, after the story became public, an anonymous benefactor (later revealed as former Nine Network chief Sam Chisholm) came forward and donated a substantial sum (reportedly AU$150,000) for Kennedy's ongoing support and care.

Brown is a longtime member of the Australian Labor Party and appeared in the "It's Time" advertisements for the party before the 1972 election. She has twice (1999 and 2003) run for New South Wales Parliament as an endorsed Labor Party candidate.

In 2008, she was appointed as the Commonwealth's first Ambassador for Ageing, then reappointed for a second three-year term in 2011.

Brown was a member of the Arts and Culture Board and a Patron of the Southern Highlands Regional Gallery. She worked with alcoholics and drug addicts at the Langton Clinic. She also spent two years with the NSW Premier's Council for Women.

Brown wrote an autobiography in 2005, called Noeline – Longterm Memoir. In 2017 she published a second memoir, Living the 1960s, about her life during that decade when living in Marrickville in Sydney.

Brown and Sattler run their own production company, Wintergreen Productions, in Bowral. They also built the Mary Mackillop Museum in North Sydney and the Slim Dusty Museum in Kempsey.

== Filmography ==
=== Film ===
Year	Title	Role	Type
1971	Walkabout	German Scientist	Feature film
1976	Kazzam International		Short film
1985	Emma's War	Mrs. Mortimer	Feature film
2001	Bowl Me Over	Eunice	Short film
2007	Razzle Dazzle: A Journey into Dance	Leonara Biviano	Feature film

=== Television ===
Year	Title	Role	Type	Ref.
1962	Jonah	Dorothea Styles	Episode: "The Coal Mutiny"	
1963	The Right Thing	Shirley	Teleplay	
1964–1966	The Mavis Bramston Show	Mavis / various characters		
1965	The Recruiting Officer	Melinda	Teleplay	
1967	The Barry Creyton Show	Various characters		
1967–1968	My Name's McGooley, What's Yours?	Rosemary 'Possum' Urkens	60 episodes	
1968	Rita and Wally	Rosemary 'Possum' Urkens	8 episodes	
1969	Homicide	Lois Davison	Season 6, episode 44: "An Unwelcome Guest"	
1969; 1973	Division 4	Betty Taylor / Julie Burns	2 episodes	
1970	The Long Arm	Mrs. Burton	Episode 1: "The Lion Was First to Know"	
1970	Phoenix 5		5 episodes	
1970	Mrs. Finnegan			
1971	The Group	Pamela	Season 1, episode 3: "This Week She's on a Diet."	
1971	The Godfathers	Dina Jackson	Episode 20: "The Star"	
1971–1975	Matlock Police	Kathleen Kirby / Judy Austin / Dolly / Dawn Elders	4 episodes	
1972	Spyforce	Mrs. Vermaar	Episode 22: "The Doctor"	
1972	Number 96	Trixie	3 episodes	
1972	The Spoiler	Sandra	Episode 6: "Deadline Sunday"	
1973	Boney	Mrs. Sawyer	Season 2, episode 6: "Boney and the Emu Man"	
1973	Certain Women			
1974	Silent Number	Mrs. Dalton	Episode 25: "The Carrier"	
1974	The Fourth Wish	Connie	Miniseries	
1974	The Last of the Australians	Jan	Season 1, Episode 2: "Double Disillusion"	
1975	Tully	Valerie	Teleplay	
1976	Alvin Purple	Iris Temple	Episode 10: "Footy Widow"	
1976	King's Men	Mirabel	Episode 13: "Contract for King"	
1976	Day of Attrician		Teleplay	
1977–1978	The Naked Vicar Show	Various characters		
1979	Tickled Pink		1 episode	
1981	Daily at Dawn	Phil Maguire	13 episodes	
1981; 1984	Kingswood Country	Janet Green / Elizabeth Windsor	2 episodes	
1984	Carson's Law	Isabelle McRae	2 episodes	
1984	The Girl From Moonooloo		TV film	
1987	Rafferty's Rules	Toni Howard	Season 1, episode 5: "The Women"	
1989	In Sickness and in Health	Railene	3 episodes	
1992	Late for School		1 episode	
1997	Fallen Angels	Sister Bernadette	Episode 5: "Snow on the Rock"	
1997	Big Sky	Patricia	Episode 12: "Great Expectations"	
1997	The Adventures of Sam	Voice	Episode 2: "Moon Daughter"	
1997	Ketchup	Voice		
1999	The Toothbrush Family	Countess de Comb (voice)	Episode: "Pegs"	
2000	Pizza		1 episode	

=== As self ===
Year	Title	Role	Type	Ref.
1966–1973; 1982–1983; 2000–2001	Beauty and the Beast	Panelist		
1970–1974	Would You Believe?	Guest panellist		
1975	Celebrity Squares	Contestant	3 episodes	
1977–1978	Graham Kennedy's Blankety Blanks	Panelist	16 episodea	
1980	Celebrity Tattletales	Herself	2 episodes	
1983	Flashback	Panelist		
1984	The Love Game	Herself	1 episode	
1985	Daryl Somers’ Blankety Blanks	Panelist	2 episodes	
1987	Have a Go	Guest Judge	3 episodes	
1989	Celebrity Family Feud	Contestant	1 episode	
1992	English at Work	Herself	1 episode	
1996	40 Years of Australian Comedy	Herself	TV special	
1999	Funny By George: The George Wallace Story	Herself	TV documentary	
2000	From Vaudeville to Video – A Salute to Australian Comedy	Herself	TV special	
2001	Who Wants to Be a Millionaire	Contestant	1 episode	
2002	This Is Your Life	Herself	1 episode	
2002	Whose House Is It Anyway?	Herself	1 episode	
2005	The Price Is Right	Contestant	1 episode	
2005–2006	Dancing with the Stars	Contestant	11 episodes	
2006	Deal or No Deal	Contestant	1 episode	
2006	TV Turns 50: The Events That Stopped A Nation	Herself	TV special	
2006	Where Are They Now	Guest (with Kingswood Country cast)	1 episode	
2007	Bert's Family Feud	Contestant	1 episode	
2007	Spicks and Specks	Guest	1 episode	
2011; 2013	Tractor Monkeys	Herself	2 episodes	
2015	Stop Laughing...This Is Serious	Herself	5 episodes	
2022	Pushing The Boundaries: The Mavis Bramston Show	Herself	Film documentary	

== Theatre ==
Year	Title	Role	Notes	Ref.
1959	Fission Chips: An Earthy Revue		Waterside Workers' Federation Hall, Sydney with New Theatre	
1961	The Sleeping Prince	Showgirl	Pocket Playhouse, Sydney	
1961	Roundup on the Moon		Pocket Playhouse, Sydney	
1962	Major Barbara		Pocket Playhouse, Sydney	
1962	My Sister Eileen		Pocket Playhouse, Sydney	
1962	What's New?		Phillip Theatre, Sydney	
1963	Hansel and Gretel		Pocket Playhouse, Sydney	
1963	Bell, Book and Candle		Pocket Playhouse, Sydney	
1963	The Face at the Window	Woman of the World	Neutral Bay Music Hall, Sydney with George Miller	
1963	Beauty and the Beast	Beauty	Neutral Bay Music Hall, Sydney with George Miller	
1964	The Evil Men Do		Neutral Bay Music Hall, Sydney with George Miller	
1964	How the West Was Lost		Neutral Bay Music Hall, Sydney with George Miller	
1967	There Will Be an Interval of 15 Minutes	Lyricist	Phillip Theatre, Sydney	
1972	The Tape Recorder		AMP Theatrette, Sydney with Q Theatre	
1972	Help		AMP Theatrette, Sydney with Q Theatre	
1972	Rooted		Attic Theatre, Toowoomba	
1973	Don's Party	Jenny	Australian tour with J. C. Williamson's & NIDA	
1973	Move Over Mrs Markham	Mrs Markham	Launceston, Theatre Royal, Hobart with Tasmanian Theatre Company	
1973	Sticks and Bones		Launceston, Theatre Royal, Hobart with Tasmanian Theatre Company	
1974	Cowardy Custard		Playhouse, Canberra, Marian St Theatre, Sydney	
1974	Three Men on a Horse		Sydney Opera House with Old Tote Theatre Company	
1974–1975	Hotel Paradiso		UNSW, Old Tote Theatre, Sydney, Playhouse, Canberra	
1975	Girls' Night Out		Jools Theatre Restaurant, Sydney	
1976	The Naked Vicar Show		The Speakeasy, Sydney	
1983	Applause	Margo Channing	SGIO Theatre, Brisbane with QTC	
1984	The Shifting Heart		Phillip St Theatre, Sydney	
1987–1988	Double Act	Alexandra	Ensemble Theatre, Sydney, Universal Theatre, Melbourne	
1990	A Night with Robinson Crusoe		Ensemble Theatre, Sydney	
1993	Barmaids	Val	Rialto Theatre, Brisbane, Sydney Opera House with Peter & Ellen Williams	
1995	Emerald City		Ensemble Theatre, Sydney	
1997	Death Defying Acts		Laycock St Theatre, Gosford, Marian St Theatre, Sydney with Northside Theatre Company	
1998	Double Act		Burnie, Launceston, Theatre Royal, Hobart	
1998	Valentine's Day		Marian St Theatre, Sydney with Northside Theatre Company	
2000	Labor Day		Marian St Theatre, Sydney with Northside Theatre Company	
2001	The Oldest Profession	Edna	Ensemble Theatre, Sydney	
2004–2006	Wallflowering	Peg	Australian tour with HIT Productions	
2007	Flying Solo		Riverside Theatres Parramatta	
2007	Glorious!	Florence Foster Jenkins	Ensemble Theatre, Sydney	
2009	Duets	Wendy / Janet / Shelly / Angela	Ensemble Theatre, Sydney	
2014–2015	Mother and Son	Maggie Beare	Comedy Theatre, Melbourne, QPAC, Brisbane, Canberra Theatre	
2022	Mono		Redland Concert Hall, Brisbane with Bunbury Productions	

== Discography ==
=== Albums ===
List of albums, with selected chart positions
Title	Album details	Peak chart positions
Title	Album details	AUS
The Front Side of Barry Creyton and Noeline Brown (with Barry Creyton)	Released: 1966; Format: LP; Label: Festival Records (FL-31606)	–
The Not So Wet and Dry Side of Barry Creyton and Noeline Brown (with Barry Creyton)	Released: 1969; Format: LP; Label: Festival Records (FL-31663)	–
The Naked Vicar Show (with Kev Golsby)	Released: 1975; Format: LP; Label: EMI (EMC-2545)	–
Son of Naked Vicar (with Kev Golsby)	Released: 1976; Format: LP; Label: EMI (EMC-2572)	55
Live from The Madge Burrows Room! / The Naked Vicar Show (with Kev Golsby, Colin McEwan and Julie McGregor)	Released: 1978; Format: LP; Label: EMI (EMC-2671)	84

== Awards and honours ==
Year	Award	Category	Nominated work	Result
1978	Logie Awards	Most Popular NSW Female Personality		Won
2008	Glugs Theatrical Awards	Norman Kessell Award for Best Performance	Florence Foster Jenkins in Glorious!	Won
2017	Equity Ensemble Awards	2017 Equity Lifetime Achievement Award	N/A	Honoured
2020	2020 Australia Day Honours	"For Services to the Performing Arts" award	N/A	Honoured
2020	Australia Post Legends of Comedy	"Legends of Comedy" Stamp	N/A	Honoured
