= 74th Golden Globe Awards =

Film award ceremony in 2017

- Official poster
- Date: January 8, 2017
- Site: The Beverly Hilton, Beverly Hills, California, U.S.
- Hosted by: Jimmy Fallon

Highlights
- Best Film: Drama: Moonlight
- Best Film: Musical or Comedy: La La Land
- Best Drama Series: The Crown
- Best Musical or Comedy Series: Atlanta
- Best Miniseries or Television movie: The People v. O. J. Simpson: American Crime Story
- Most awards: La La Land (7)
- Most nominations: La La Land (7)

Television coverage
- Network: NBC

The 74th Golden Globe Awards, honoring the best in film and American television of 2016, was broadcast live on January 8, 2017, from The Beverly Hilton in Beverly Hills, California beginning at 5:00 p.m. PST / 8:00 p.m. EST by NBC. The ceremony was produced by Dick Clark Productions in association with the Hollywood Foreign Press Association.

Talk-show host Jimmy Fallon was announced as the host of the ceremony on August 2, 2016. Meryl Streep was announced as the Cecil B. DeMille Lifetime Achievement Award honoree on November 3, 2016. The nominations were announced on December 12, 2016, by Don Cheadle, Laura Dern and Anna Kendrick.

La La Land won all seven awards for which it had been nominated, becoming the most successful film in Golden Globe Awards history. including Best Director and Best Screenplay for Damien Chazelle, and Best Motion Picture – Musical or Comedy. The only other film to win more than one award was Elle, which won both the awards for which it had been nominated. Atlanta, The Crown, The Night Manager, and The People v. O. J. Simpson: American Crime Story were among the television shows that received multiple awards.

== Winners and nominees ==
The nominees for the 74th Golden Globe Awards were announced on December 12, 2016.

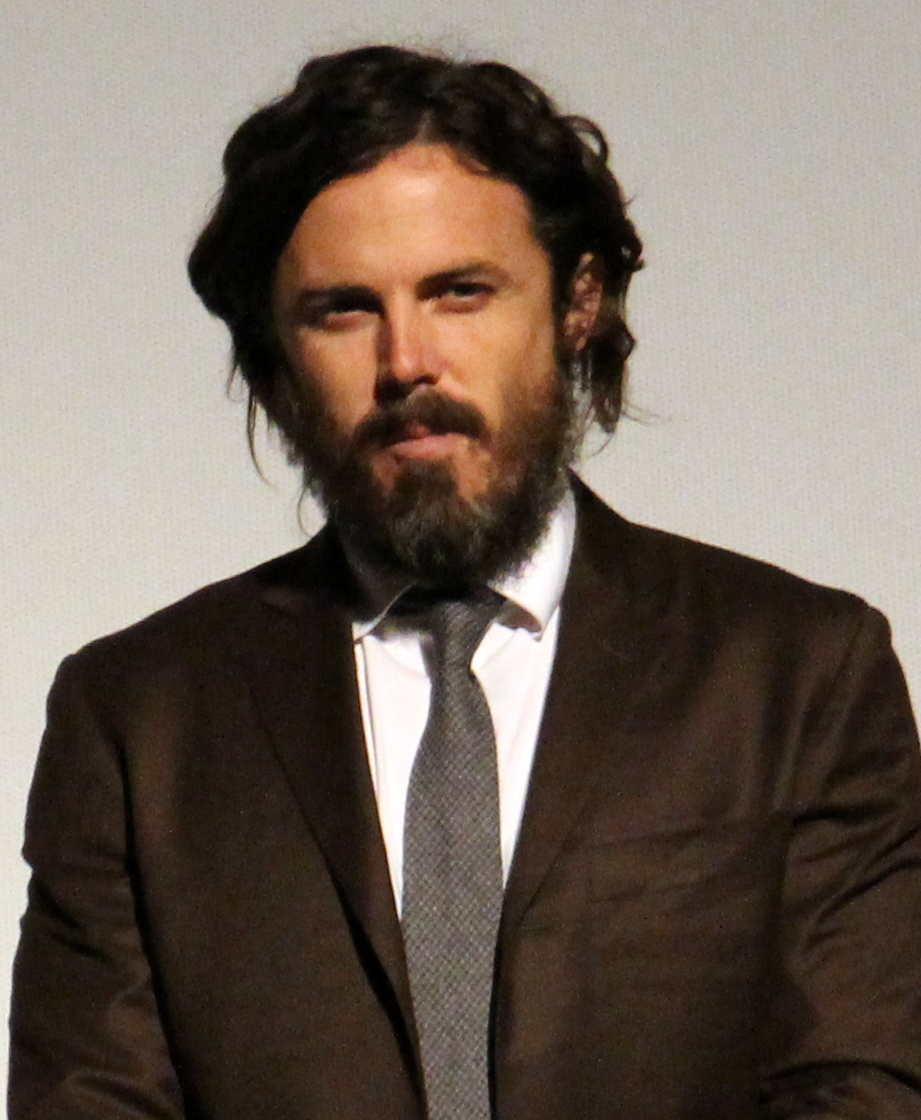
Casey Affleck, Best Actor in a Motion Picture – Drama winner

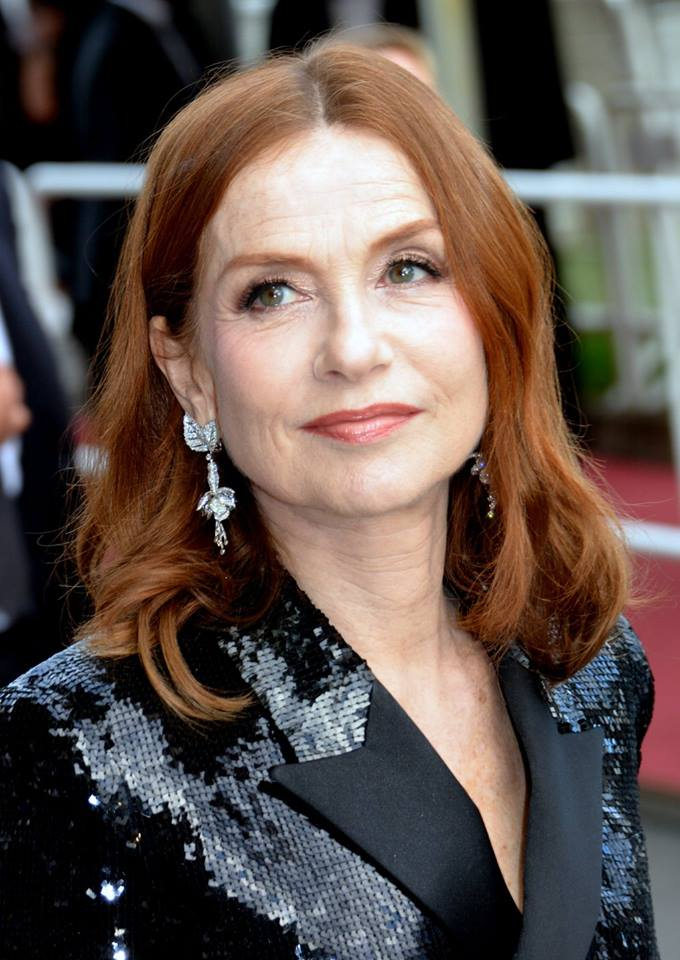
Isabelle Huppert, Best Actress in a Motion Picture – Drama winner

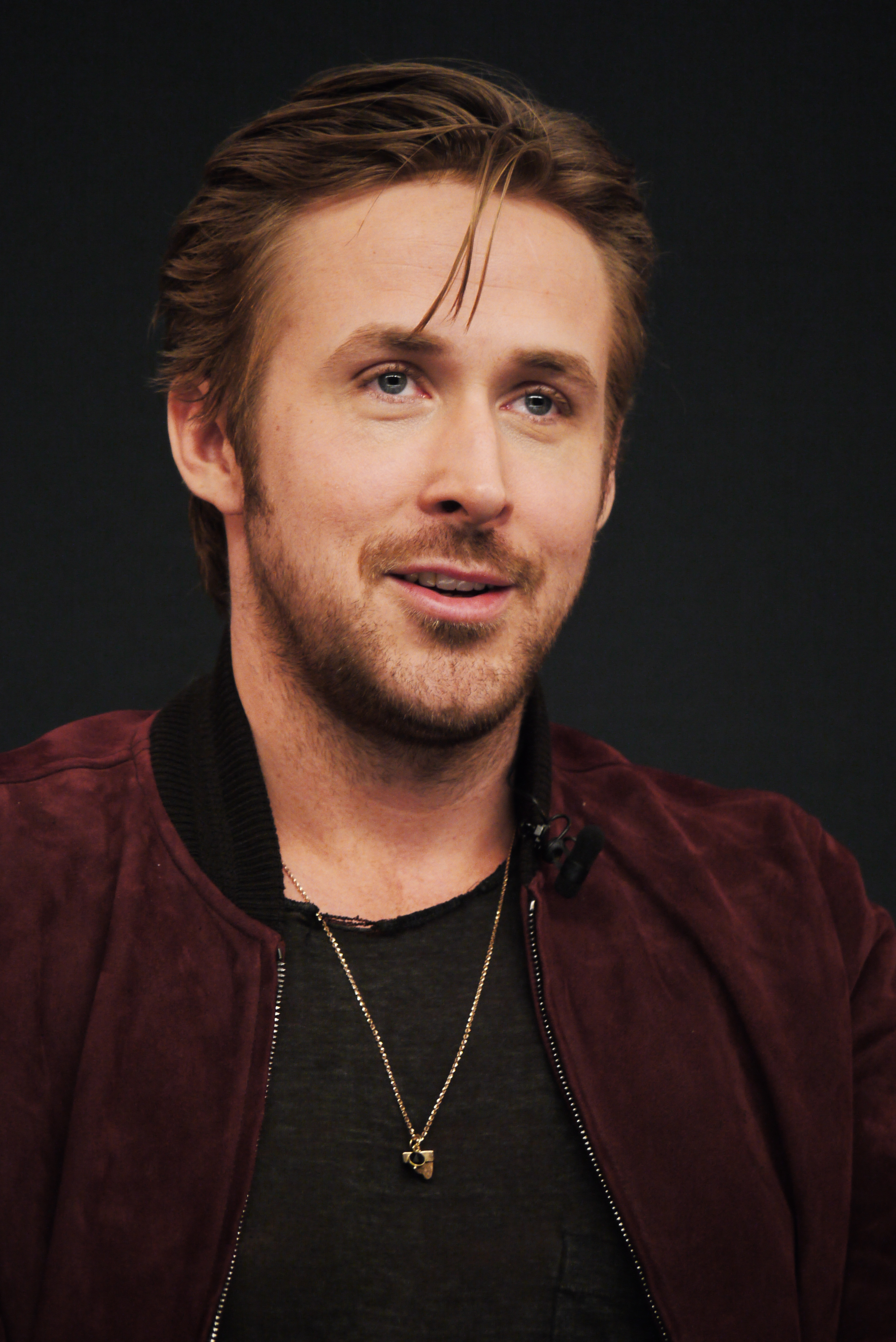
Ryan Gosling, Best Actor in a Motion Picture – Musical or Comedy winner

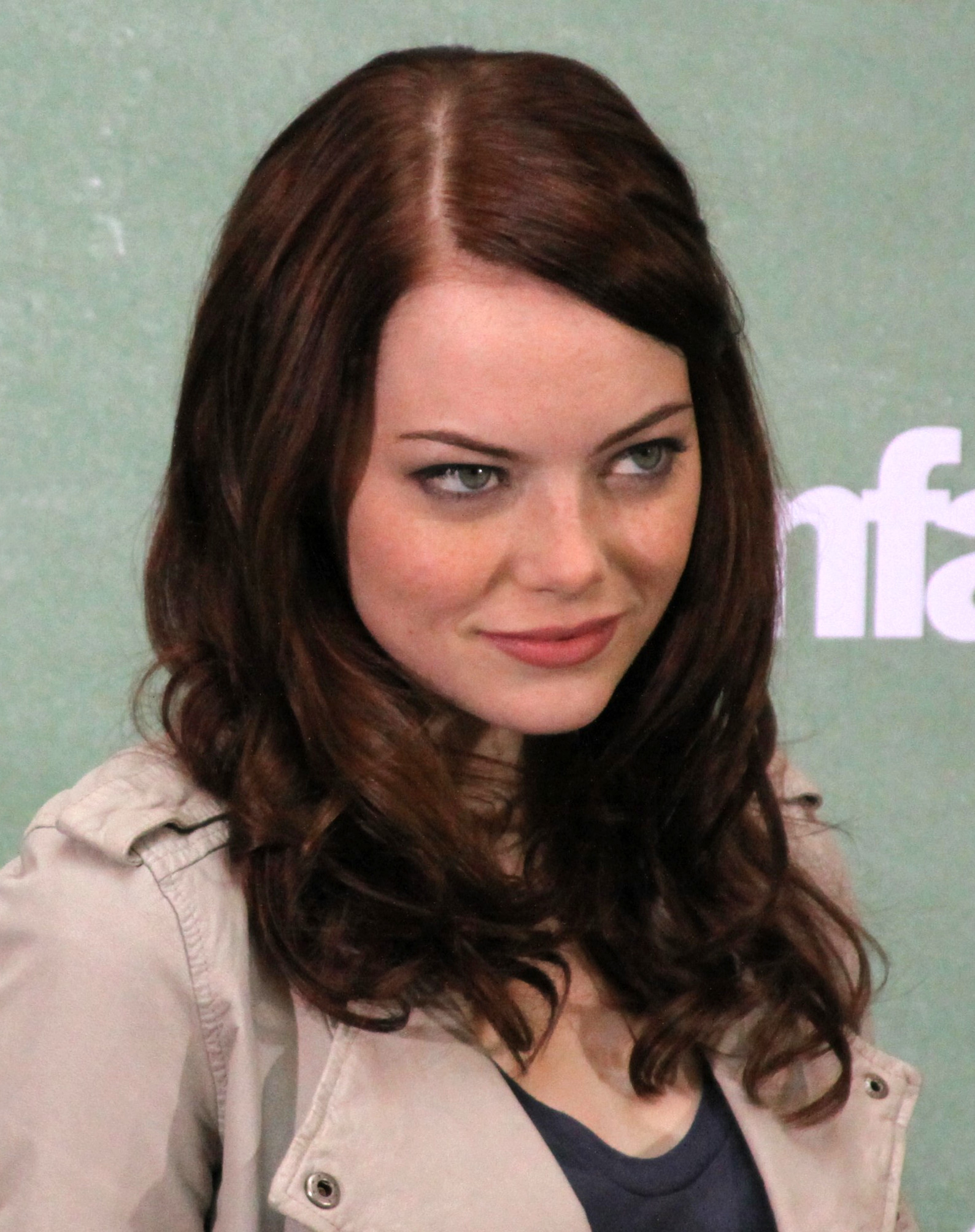
Emma Stone, Best Actress in a Motion Picture – Musical or Comedy winner

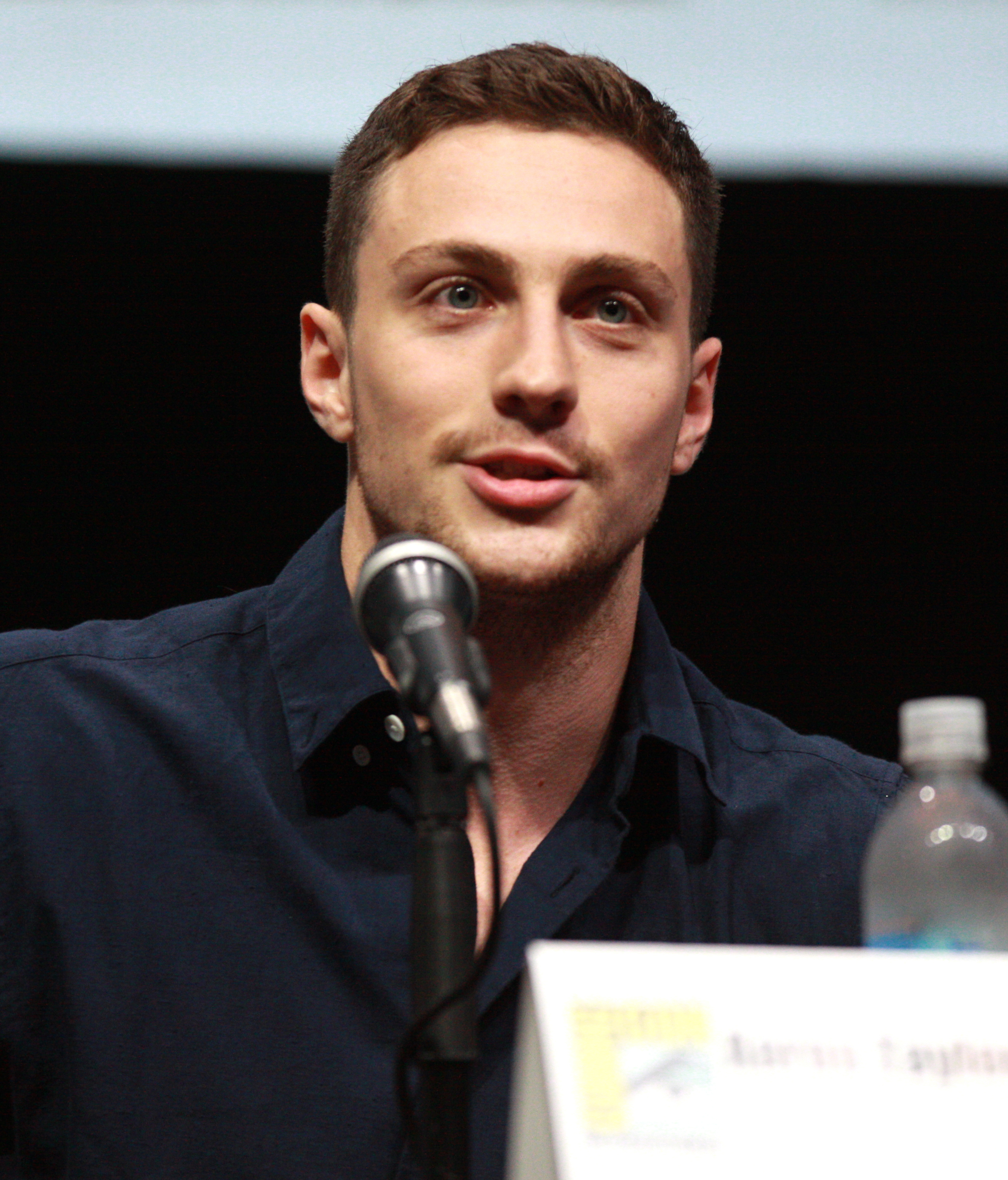
Aaron Taylor-Johnson, Best Supporting Actor winner

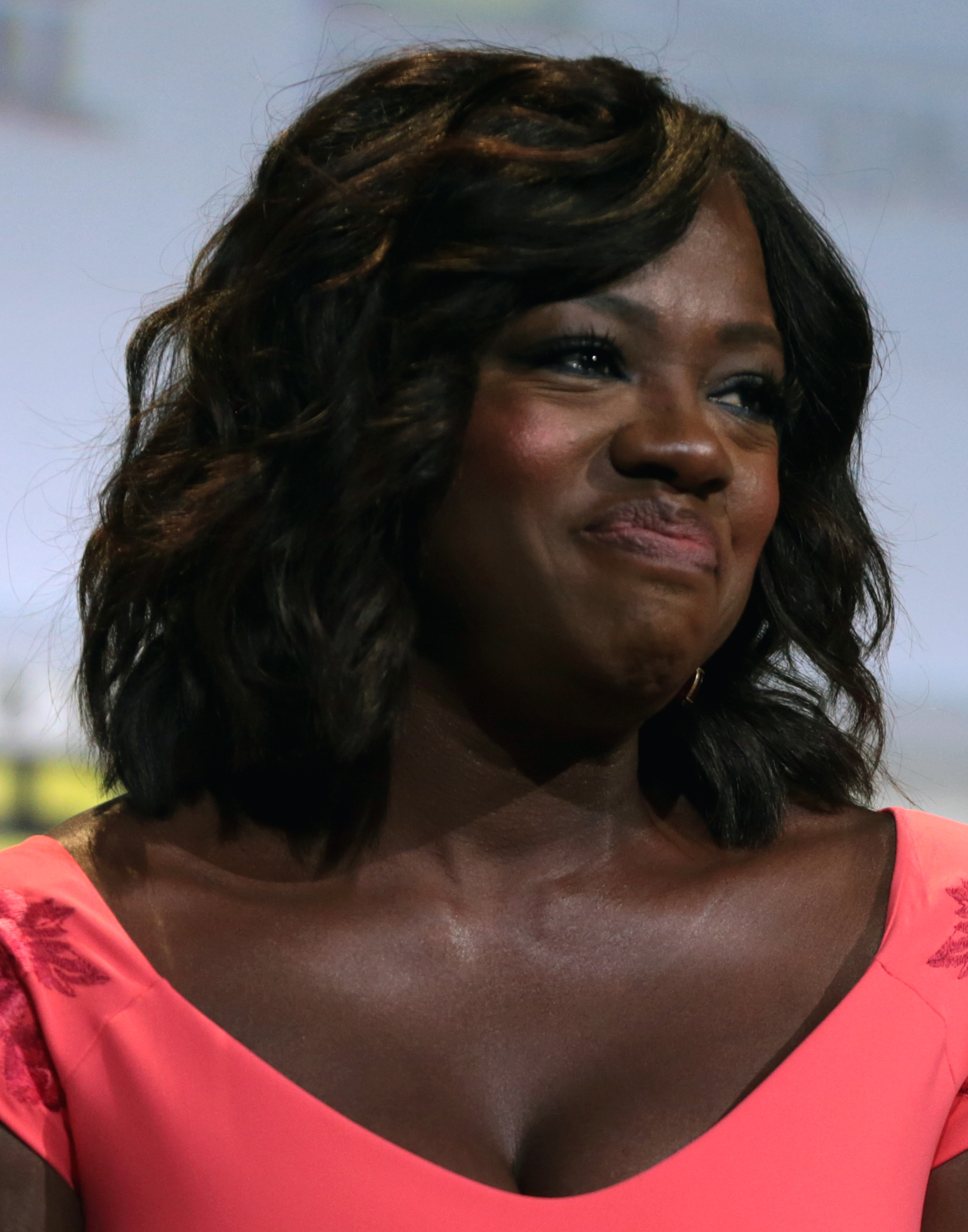
Viola Davis, Best Supporting Actress winner

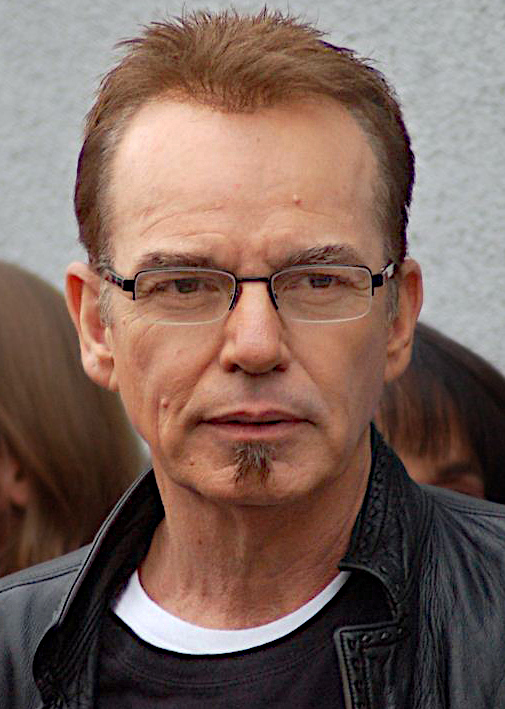
Billy Bob Thornton, Best Actor in a Television Series – Drama winner

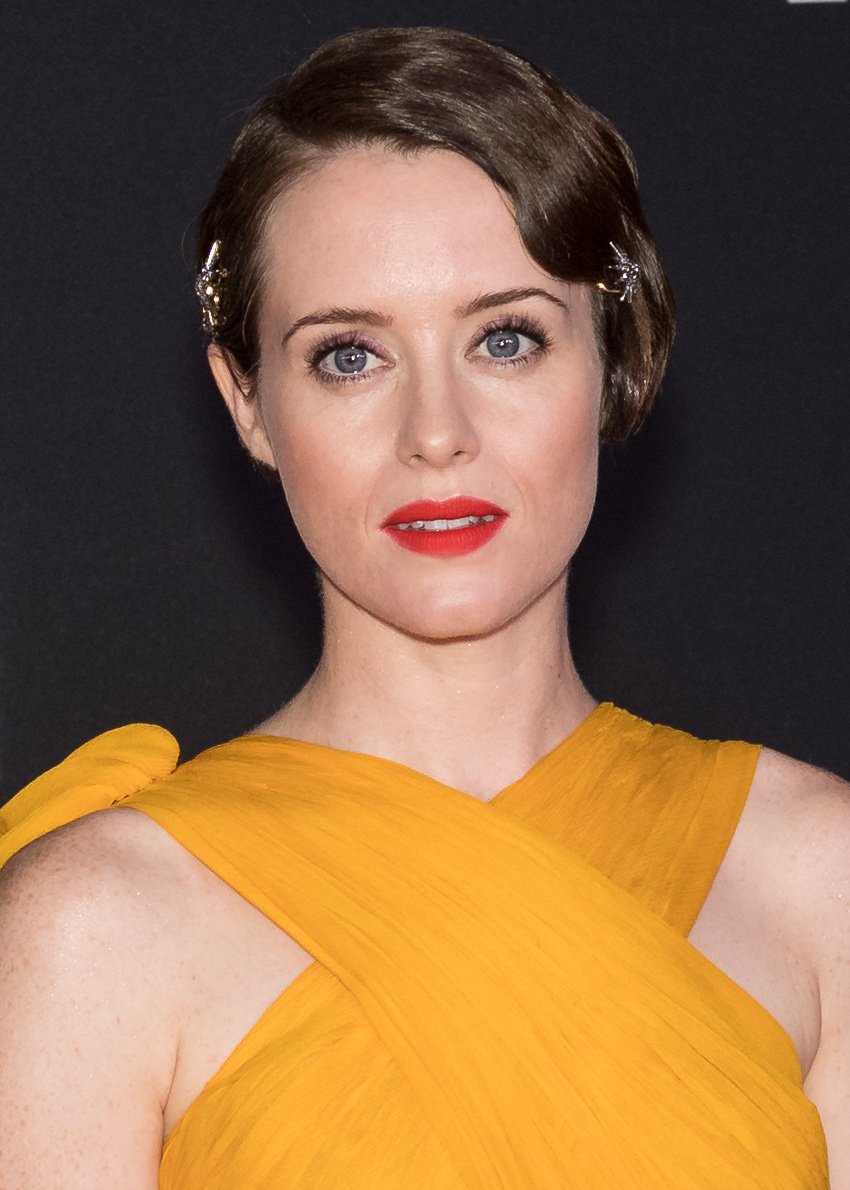
Claire Foy, Best Actress in a Television Series – Drama winner

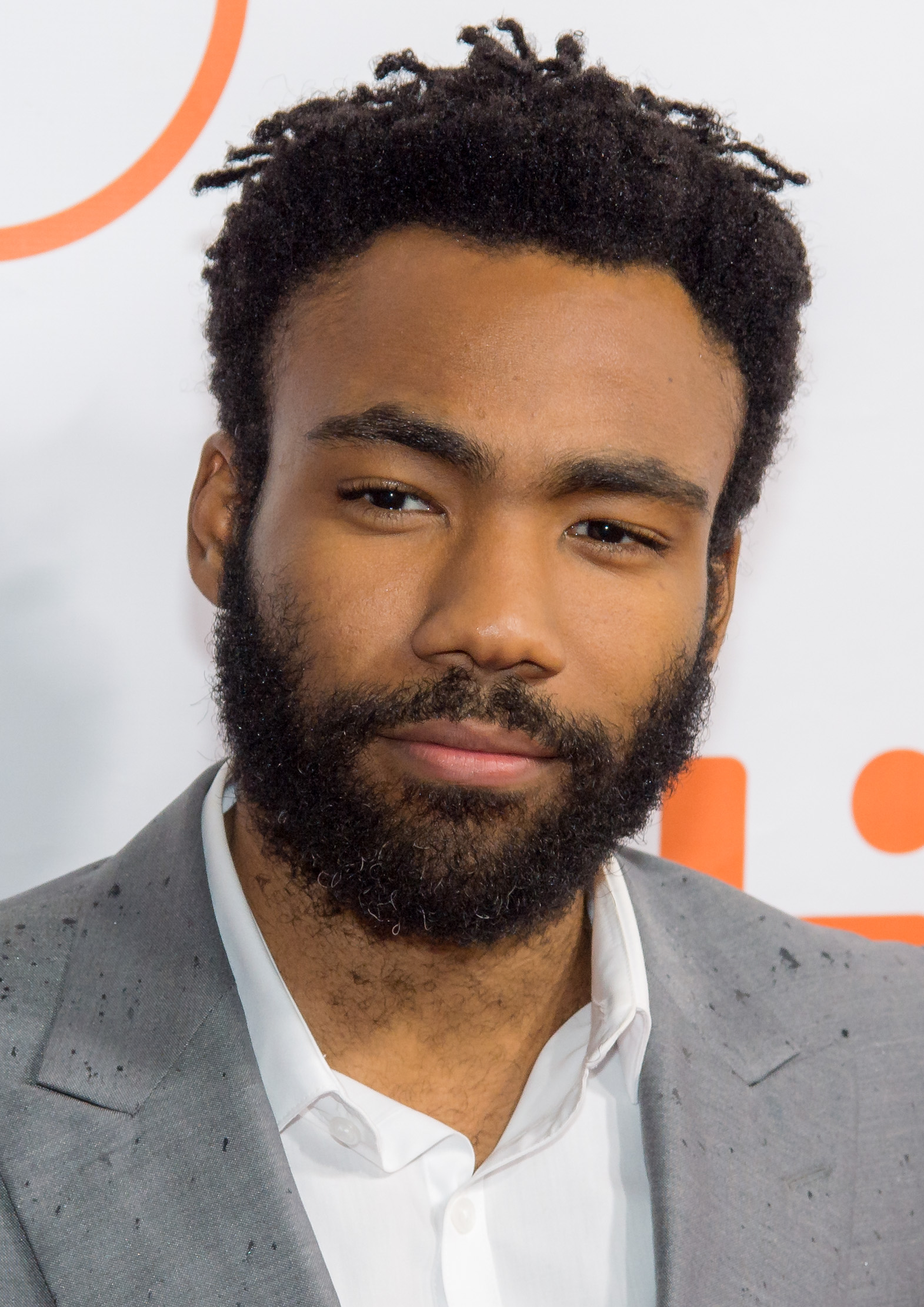
Donald Glover, Best Actor in a Television Series – Comedy or Musical winner

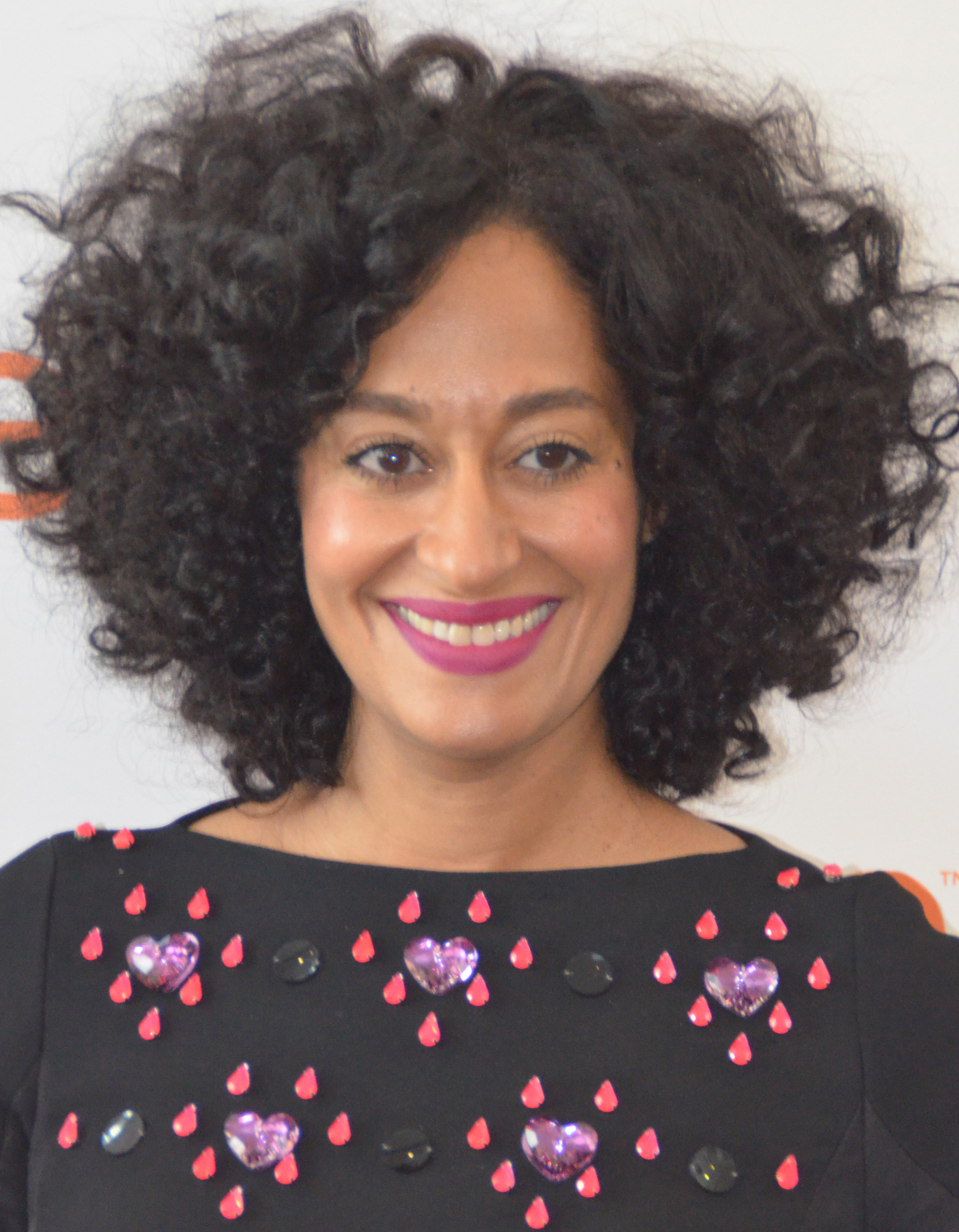
Tracee Ellis Ross, Best Actress in a Television Series – Comedy or Musical winner

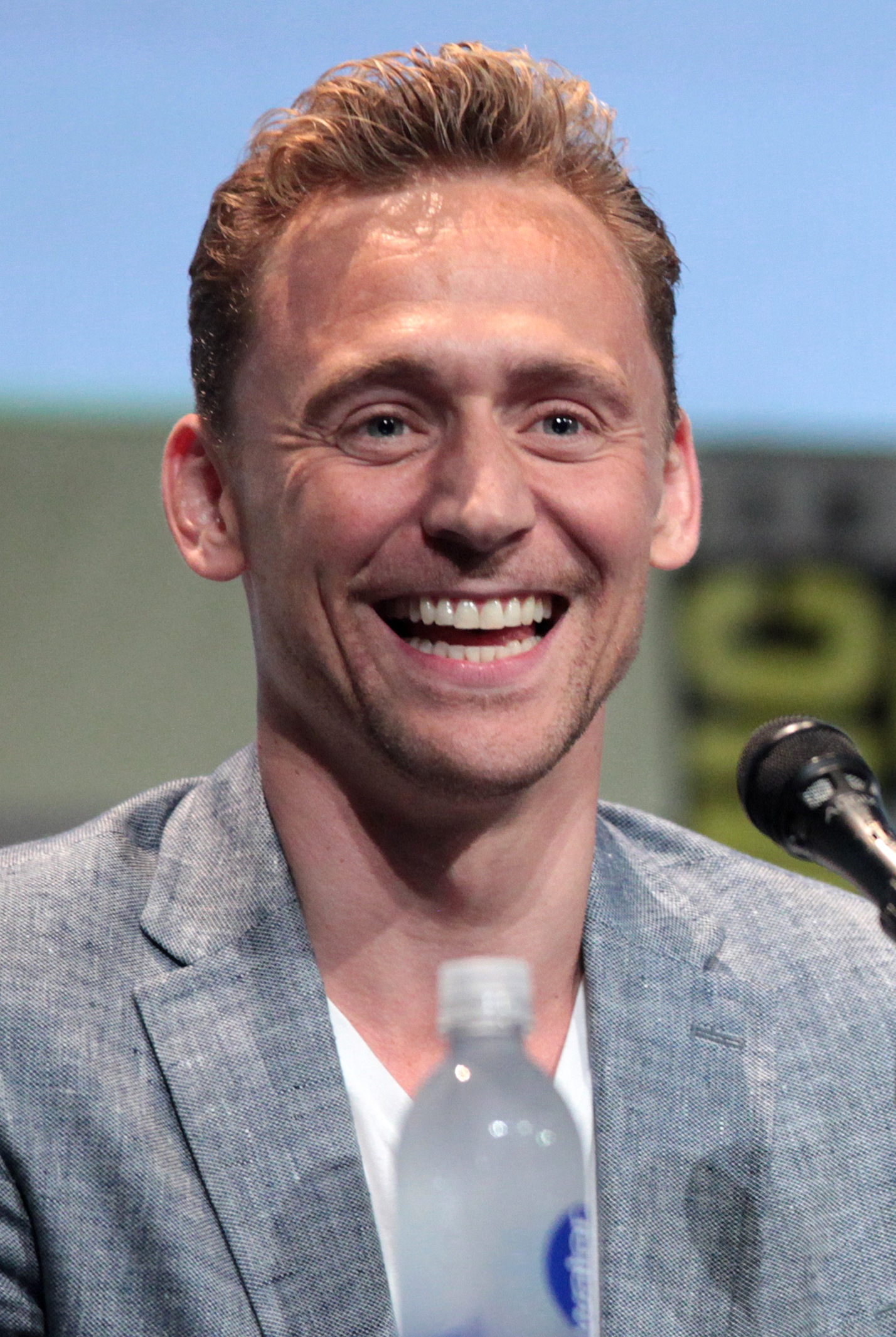
Tom Hiddleston, Best Actor in a Miniseries or Television Film winner

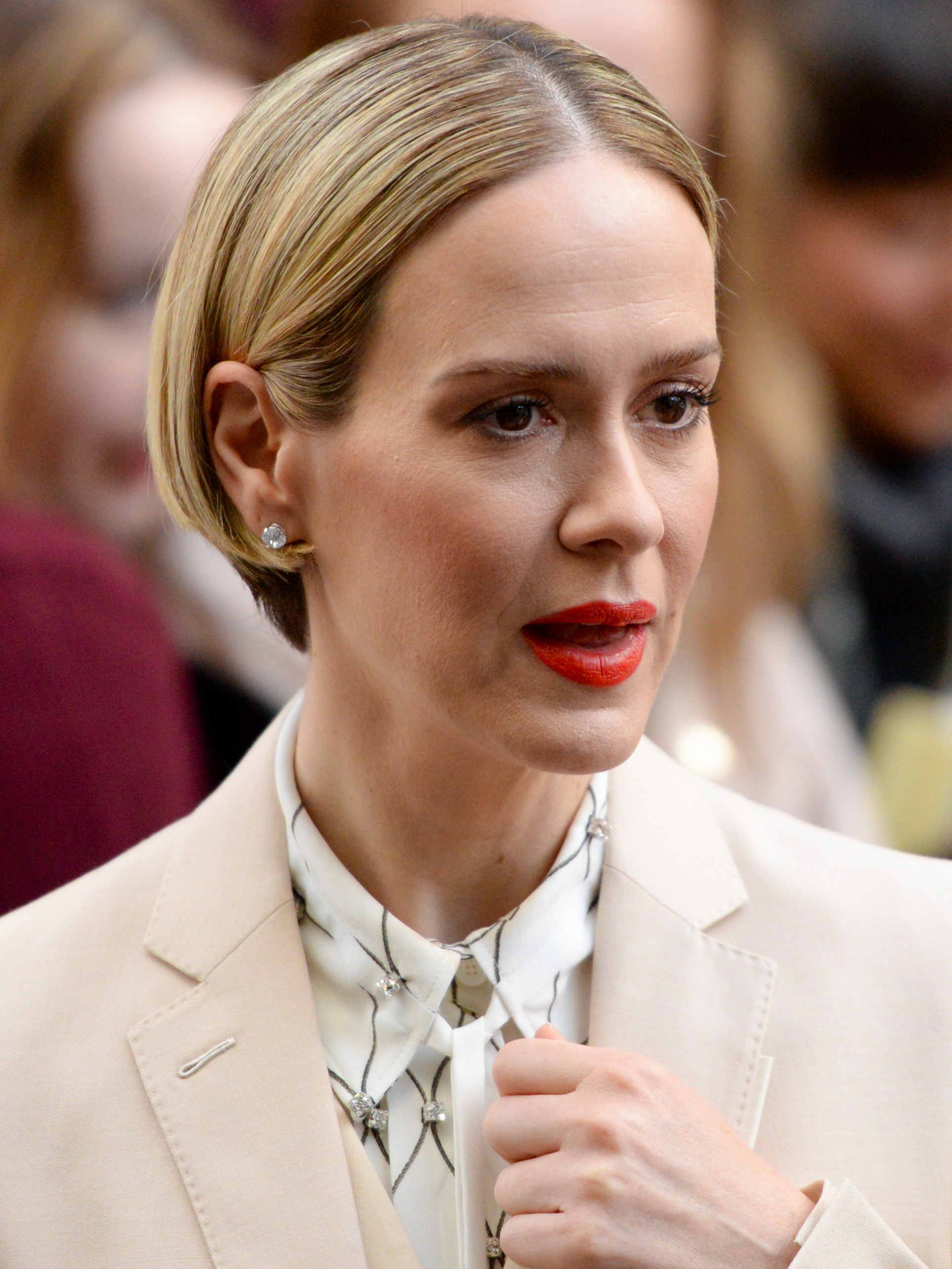
Sarah Paulson, Best Actress in a Miniseries or Television Film winner

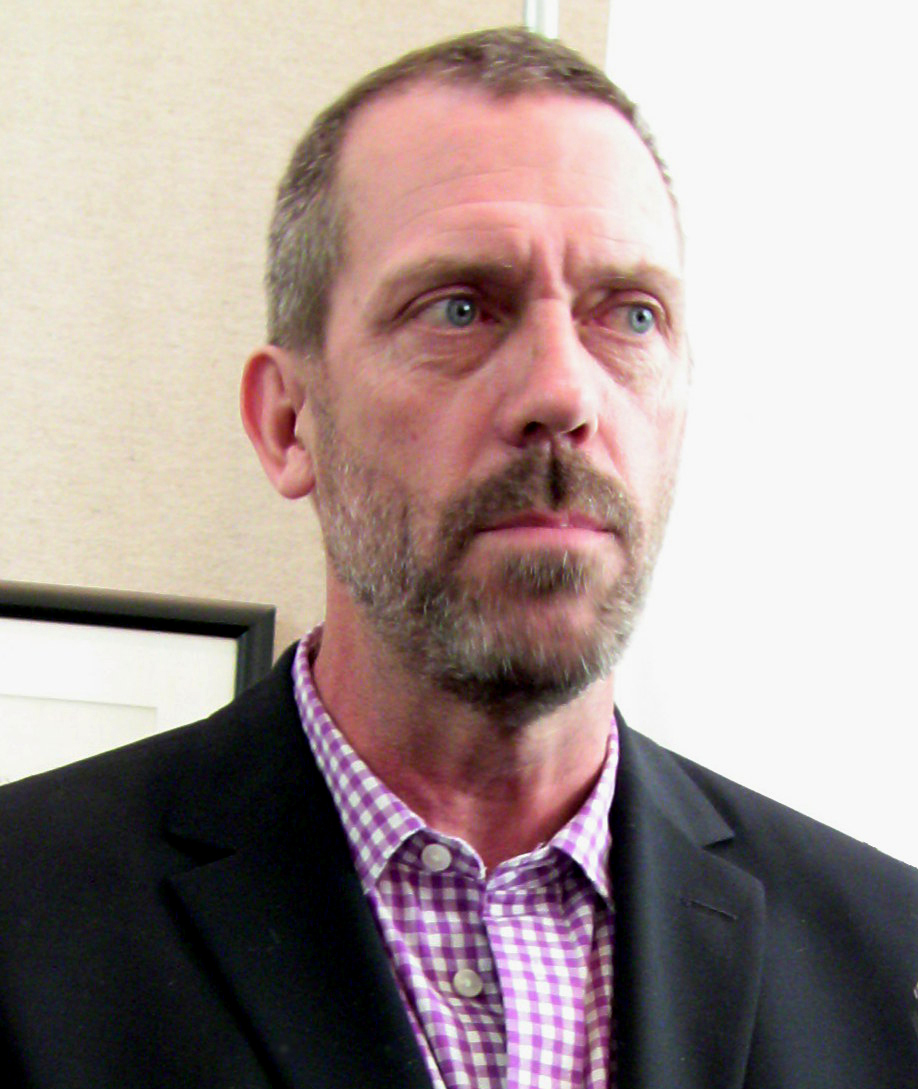
Hugh Laurie, Best Supporting Actor in a Series, Miniseries, or Television Film winner

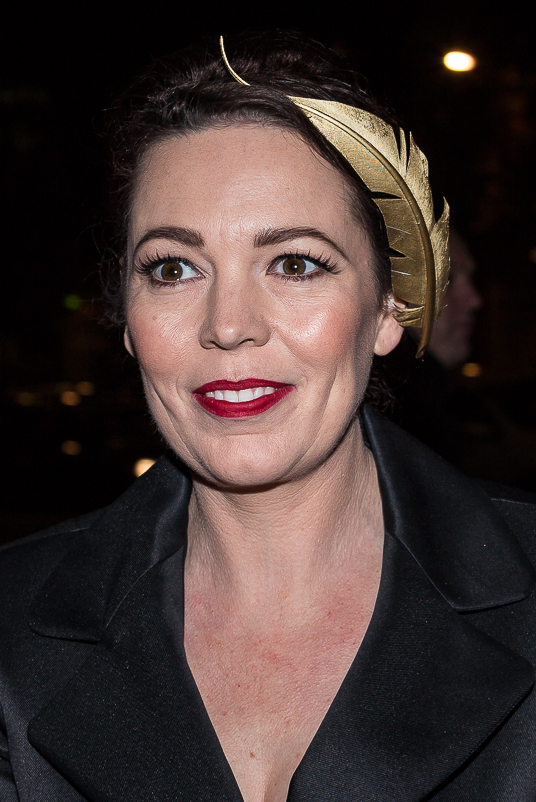
Olivia Colman, Best Supporting Actress in a Series, Miniseries, or Television Film winner

=== Film ===
Best Motion Picture
Drama	Musical or Comedy
Moonlight; Hacksaw Ridge; Hell or High Water; Lion; Manchester by the Sea	La La Land; 20th Century Women; Deadpool; Florence Foster Jenkins; Sing Street
Best Performance in a Motion Picture – Drama
Actor	Actress
Casey Affleck – Manchester by the Sea as Lee Chandler; Joel Edgerton – Loving as Richard Loving; Andrew Garfield – Hacksaw Ridge as Desmond T. Doss; Viggo Mortensen – Captain Fantastic as Ben Cash; Denzel Washington – Fences as Troy Maxson	Isabelle Huppert – Elle as Michèle Leblanc; Amy Adams – Arrival as Dr. Louise Banks; Jessica Chastain – Miss Sloane as Elizabeth Sloane; Ruth Negga – Loving as Mildred Loving; Natalie Portman – Jackie as Jackie Kennedy
Best Performance in a Motion Picture – Musical or Comedy
Actor	Actress
Ryan Gosling – La La Land as Sebastian Wilder; Colin Farrell – The Lobster as David; Hugh Grant – Florence Foster Jenkins as St. Clair Bayfield; Jonah Hill – War Dogs as Efraim Diveroli; Ryan Reynolds – Deadpool as Wade Wilson / Deadpool	Emma Stone – La La Land as Mia Dolan; Annette Bening – 20th Century Women as Dorothea Fields; Lily Collins – Rules Don't Apply as Marla Mabrey; Hailee Steinfeld – The Edge of Seventeen as Nadine Franklin; Meryl Streep – Florence Foster Jenkins as Florence Foster Jenkins
Best Supporting Performance in a Motion Picture – Drama, Musical or Comedy
Supporting Actor	Supporting Actress
Aaron Taylor-Johnson – Nocturnal Animals as Ray Marcus; Mahershala Ali – Moonlight as Juan; Jeff Bridges – Hell or High Water as Marcus Hamilton; Simon Helberg – Florence Foster Jenkins as Cosmé McMoon; Dev Patel – Lion as adult Saroo Brierley	Viola Davis – Fences as Rose Maxson; Naomie Harris – Moonlight as Paula; Nicole Kidman – Lion as Sue Brierley; Octavia Spencer – Hidden Figures as Dorothy Vaughan; Michelle Williams – Manchester by the Sea as Randi
Other
Best Director	Best Screenplay
Damien Chazelle – La La Land; Tom Ford – Nocturnal Animals; Mel Gibson – Hacksaw Ridge; Barry Jenkins – Moonlight; Kenneth Lonergan – Manchester by the Sea	Damien Chazelle – La La Land; Tom Ford – Nocturnal Animals; Barry Jenkins – Moonlight; Kenneth Lonergan – Manchester by the Sea; Taylor Sheridan – Hell or High Water
Best Original Score	Best Original Song
Justin Hurwitz – La La Land; Nicholas Britell – Moonlight; Jóhann Jóhannsson – Arrival; Dustin O'Halloran and Hauschka – Lion; Hans Zimmer, Pharrell Williams, and Benjamin Wallfisch – Hidden Figures	"City of Stars" (Justin Hurwitz, Benj Pasek, and Justin Paul) – La La Land; "Can't Stop the Feeling!" (Max Martin, Shellback, and Justin Timberlake) – Trolls; "Faith" (Ryan Tedder, Stevie Wonder, and Francis Farewell Starlite) – Sing; "Gold" (Brian Burton, Stephen Gaghan, Daniel Pemberton, and Iggy Pop) – Gold; "How Far I'll Go" (Lin-Manuel Miranda) – Moana
Best Animated Feature Film	Best Foreign Language Film
Zootopia; Kubo and the Two Strings; Moana; My Life as a Zucchini; Sing	Elle (France); Divines (France); Neruda (Chile); The Salesman (Iran/France); Toni Erdmann (Germany)

=== Films with multiple nominations ===
The following 17 films received multiple nominations:

Nominations	Films
7	La La Land
6	Moonlight
5	Manchester by the Sea
4	Florence Foster Jenkins
4	Lion
3	Hacksaw Ridge
3	Hell or High Water
3	Nocturnal Animals
2	20th Century Women
2	Arrival
2	Deadpool
2	Elle
2	Fences
2	Hidden Figures
2	Loving
2	Moana
2	Sing

=== Films with multiple wins ===
The following 2 films received multiple wins:

Wins	Films
7	La La Land
2	Elle

=== Television ===
Best Series
Drama	Musical or Comedy
The Crown (Netflix); Game of Thrones (HBO); Stranger Things (Netflix); This Is Us (NBC); Westworld (HBO)	Atlanta (FX); Black-ish (ABC); Mozart in the Jungle (Amazon Prime Video); Transparent (Prime Video); Veep (HBO)
Best Performance in a Television Series – Drama
Actor	Actress
Billy Bob Thornton – Goliath (Prime Video) as Billy McBride; Rami Malek – Mr. Robot (USA Network) as Elliot Alderson; Bob Odenkirk – Better Call Saul (AMC) as James "Jimmy" McGill; Matthew Rhys – The Americans (FX) as Philip Jennings; Liev Schreiber – Ray Donovan (Showtime) as Ray Donovan	Claire Foy – The Crown (Netflix) as Queen Elizabeth II; Caitríona Balfe – Outlander (Starz) as Claire Fraser; Keri Russell – The Americans (FX) as Elizabeth Jennings; Winona Ryder – Stranger Things (Netflix) as Joyce Byers; Evan Rachel Wood – Westworld (HBO) as Dolores Abernathy
Best Performance in a Television Series – Musical or Comedy
Actor	Actress
Donald Glover – Atlanta (FX) as Earnest "Earn" Marks; Anthony Anderson – Black-ish (ABC) as Andre "Dre" Johnson Sr.; Gael García Bernal – Mozart in the Jungle (Prime Video) as Rodrigo De Souza; Nick Nolte – Graves (Epix) as Richard Graves; Jeffrey Tambor – Transparent (Prime Video) as Maura Pfefferman	Tracee Ellis Ross – Black-ish (ABC) as Dr. Rainbow "Bow" Johnson; Rachel Bloom – Crazy Ex-Girlfriend (The CW) as Rebecca Nora Bunch; Julia Louis-Dreyfus – Veep (HBO) as Selina Meyer; Sarah Jessica Parker – Divorce (HBO) as Frances Dufresne; Issa Rae – Insecure (HBO) as Issa Dee; Gina Rodriguez – Jane the Virgin (The CW) as Jane Gloriana Villanueva
Best Performance in a Miniseries or Television Film
Actor	Actress
Tom Hiddleston – The Night Manager (AMC) as Jonathan Pine; Riz Ahmed – The Night Of (HBO) as Nasir "Naz" Khan; Bryan Cranston – All the Way (HBO) as President Lyndon B. Johnson; John Turturro – The Night Of (HBO) as John Stone; Courtney B. Vance – The People v. O. J. Simpson: American Crime Story (FX) as Johnnie Cochran	Sarah Paulson – The People v. O. J. Simpson: American Crime Story (FX) as Marcia Clark; Felicity Huffman – American Crime (ABC) as Leslie Graham; Riley Keough – The Girlfriend Experience (Starz) as Christine Reade / "Chelsea Rayne" / "Amanda Hayes"; Charlotte Rampling – London Spy (Netflix) as Frances Turner; Kerry Washington – Confirmation (HBO) as Anita Hill
Best Supporting Performance in a Series, Miniseries or Television Film
Supporting Actor	Supporting Actress
Hugh Laurie – The Night Manager (AMC) as Richard Onslow Roper; Sterling K. Brown – The People v. O. J. Simpson: American Crime Story (FX) as Christopher Darden; John Lithgow – The Crown (Netflix) as Winston Churchill; Christian Slater – Mr. Robot (USA Network) as Mr. Robot / Edward Alderson; John Travolta – The People v. O. J. Simpson: American Crime Story (FX) as Robert Shapiro	Olivia Colman – The Night Manager (AMC) as Angela Burr; Lena Headey – Game of Thrones (HBO) as Cersei Lannister; Chrissy Metz – This Is Us (NBC) as Kate Pearson; Mandy Moore – This Is Us (NBC) as Rebecca Pearson; Thandie Newton – Westworld (HBO) as Maeve Millay
Best Miniseries or Television Film
The People v. O. J. Simpson: American Crime Story (FX); American Crime (ABC); The Dresser (Starz); The Night Manager (AMC); The Night Of (HBO)

=== Series with multiple nominations ===
The following 16 series received multiple nominations:

Nominations	Series
5	The People v. O. J. Simpson: American Crime Story
4	The Night Manager
3	Black-ish
3	The Crown
3	The Night Of
3	This Is Us
3	Westworld
2	American Crime
2	The Americans
2	Atlanta
2	Game of Thrones
2	Mozart in the Jungle
2	Mr. Robot
2	Stranger Things
2	Transparent
2	Veep

=== Series with multiple wins ===
The following 4 series received multiple wins:

Wins	Series
3	The Night Manager
2	Atlanta
2	The Crown
2	The People v. O. J. Simpson: American Crime Story

== Ceremony ==
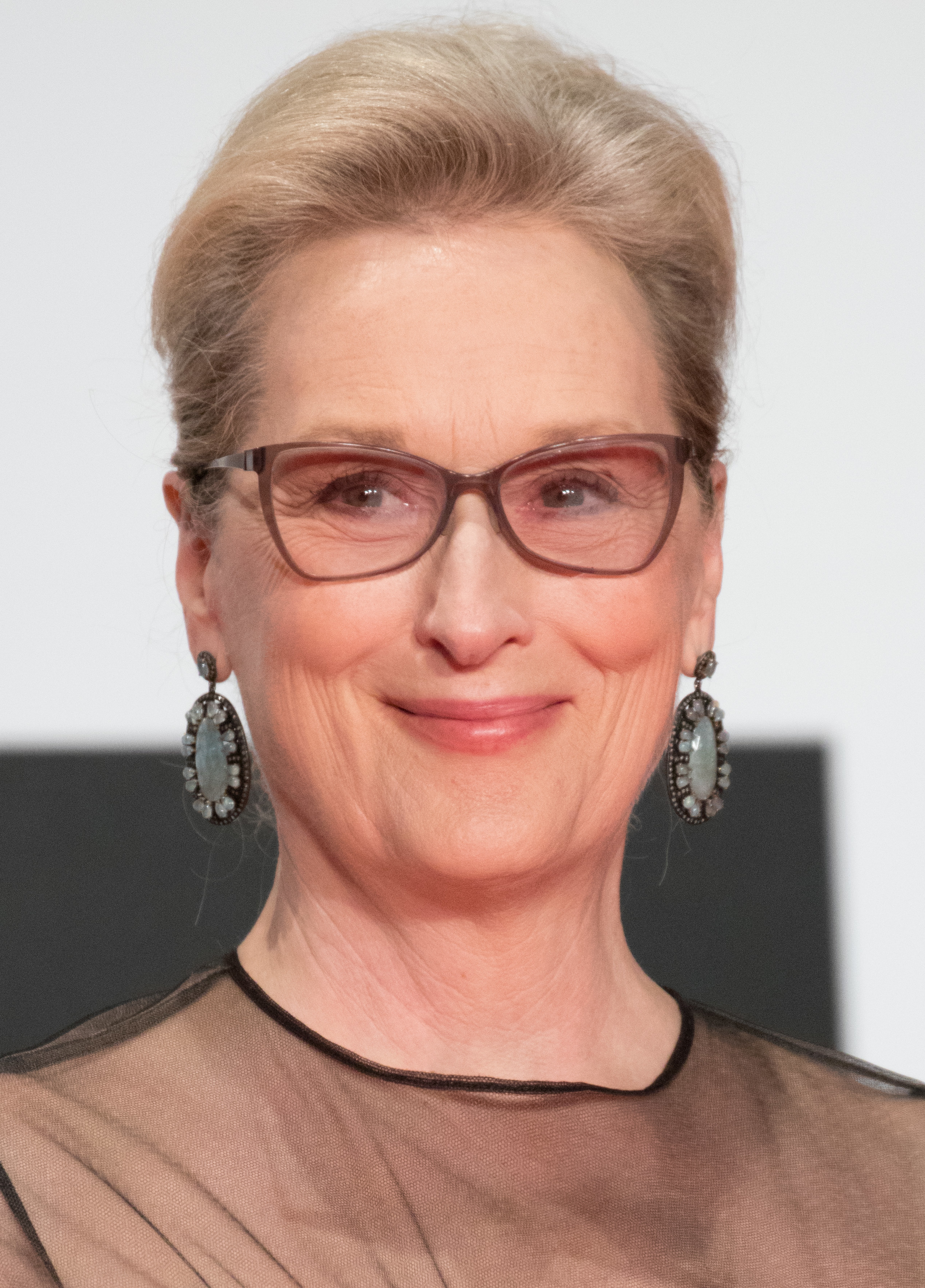
Meryl Streep, Cecil B. DeMille Lifetime Achievement Award winner

Jimmy Fallon opened the ceremony with a long homage to La La Land, with cameos from Nicole Kidman, Amy Adams, Ryan Reynolds, Tina Fey, Justin Timberlake, and others. His opening speech was marred by a brief delay after his teleprompter broke.

Meryl Streep, recipient of the Golden Globe Cecil B. DeMille Award, used her acceptance speech to criticize, without stating names, President-elect Donald Trump's alleged imitation of disabled New York Times journalist Serge F. Kovaleski, stating: "Disrespect invites disrespect. Violence incites violence. When powerful people use their position to bully we all lose." On the subject of diversity in Hollywood, Streep said, "Hollywood is crawling with outsiders and foreigners, and if we kick them all out, you'll have nothing to watch but football and mixed martial arts, which are not the arts."

- Ben Affleck, Sienna Miller and Zoe Saldaña with Best Director – Motion Picture
- Casey Affleck introduced Manchester by the Sea
- Drew Barrymore and Timothy Olyphant with Best Television Series – Comedy or Musical and Best Actress in a Television Series – Comedy or Musical
- Kristen Bell and Cuba Gooding Jr. with Best Supporting Actress – Series, Miniseries or Television Film
- Annette Bening introduced 20th Century Women
- Matt Bomer and Naomi Campbell with Best Supporting Actor – Series, Miniseries or Television Film
- Pierce Brosnan introduced Sing Street
- Steve Carell and Kristen Wiig with Best Animated Feature Film
- Jessica Chastain and Eddie Redmayne with Best Motion Picture – Musical or Comedy
- Priyanka Chopra and Jeffrey Dean Morgan with Best Actor in a Television Series – Drama
- Matt Damon with Best Actress in a Motion Picture – Musical or Comedy
- Viola Davis with Cecil B. DeMille Award
- Laura Dern and Jon Hamm with Best Television Series – Drama and Best Actress in a Television Series – Drama
- Leonardo DiCaprio with Best Actress in a Motion Picture – Drama
- Gal Gadot and Chris Hemsworth with Best Foreign Language Film
- Hugh Grant introduced Florence Foster Jenkins
- Jake Gyllenhaal introduced Deadpool
- Goldie Hawn and Amy Schumer with Best Actor in a Motion Picture – Musical or Comedy
- Felicity Jones and Diego Luna with Best Screenplay
- Michael Keaton with Best Supporting Actress – Motion Picture
- Anna Kendrick and Justin Theroux with Best Actor – Miniseries or Television Film
- Nicole Kidman and Reese Witherspoon with Best Miniseries or Television Film and Best Actress – Miniseries or Television Film
- Brie Larson with Best Actor in a Motion Picture – Drama
- John Legend introduced La La Land
- Mandy Moore and Milo Ventimiglia with Best Actor in a Television Series – Comedy or Musical
- Dev Patel and Sunny Pawar introduced Lion
- Chris Pine introduced Hell or High Water
- Brad Pitt introduced Moonlight
- Ryan Reynolds and Emma Stone with Best Supporting Actor – Motion Picture
- Sylvester Stallone and Carl Weathers with Best Motion Picture – Drama
- Sting and Carrie Underwood with Best Original Score and Best Original Song
- Vince Vaughn introduced Hacksaw Ridge
- Sofía Vergara with intro of Miss Golden Globe

== Reception ==
Press coverage of the event largely focused on Meryl Streep's remarks and the responses to them, and this also dominated popular responses, generating what the BBC characterized as a "firestorm on Twitter". Donald Trump responded to Streep's comments on Twitter, describing her as "one of the most over-rated actresses in Hollywood" and a "Hillary flunky", and stating, "For the 100th time, I never 'mocked' a disabled reporter (would never do that) but simply showed him 'groveling' when he totally changed a 16 year old story that he had written in order to make me look bad. Just more very dishonest media!"

Lorenzo Soria, president of the Hollywood Foreign Press Association (HFPA) which runs the annual Golden Globes ceremony, wrote on Twitter on January 10: "As an organisation of journalists, the HFPA stands by your defence of free expression and we reject any calls for censorship". Dana White, president of the Ultimate Fighting Championship, responded to Streep's reference to mixed martial arts (MMA), defending the sport as an art, and saying that "the last thing I expect is for an uppity 80-year-old lady to be in our demographic and love mixed martial arts". Scott Coker, president of Bellator MMA, also defended MMA as an art, and highlighted the sport's diversity; he invited Streep to attend an event.

Tom Hiddleston received backlash on social media for mentioning that Sudanese medical workers had "binge-watched" The Night Manager, while accepting the award for Best Actor – Miniseries or Television Film. He apologized after the ceremony for his "inelegantly expressed" remarks.

Richard Lawson, reviewing the ceremony in Vanity Fair, stated that Jimmy Fallon's opening homage to La La Land began as "a fun, starry sampling of this year's nominees", but had "worn out its welcome" before the end. Lawson described Fallon as an "oddly tone-deaf" host, and criticized his opening speech: "The jokes were stale and wheezy and Fallon's lovable-cute shtick was more wearying than it was charming." He praised Kristen Wiig and Steve Carell's introduction of the Best Animated Feature Film award as "hilarious [...] weird, inspired, clever without smirking".

The Guardian's film critic Peter Bradshaw expressed disappointment that La La Land's success "shut out a lot of contenders that are now in danger of being forgotten and losing momentum", particularly highlighting Nocturnal Animals and Moonlight. He praised Isabelle Huppert's win for Best Actress in a Motion Picture – Drama, calling it "the most extraordinary award".

=== Ratings ===
The ceremony averaged a Nielsen 5.6 ratings/18 share, and was watched by 20.02 million viewers. The ratings was an eight percent increase from the previous year's ceremony's viewership of 18.5 million, becoming the third highest in a decade.

== In Memoriam ==
No "In Memoriam" section was broadcast on television during the ceremony. The HFPA included a slideshow on their website including the following names:

- Pat Harrington Jr.
- David Bowie
- Alan Rickman
- George Kennedy
- Larry Drake
- Ken Howard
- Garry Shandling
- Earl Hamner Jr.
- Patty Duke
- Ronit Elkabetz
- Prince
- Muhammad Ali
- Christina Grimmie
- Theresa Saldana
- Peter Shaffer
- Anton Yelchin
- Michael Cimino
- Abbas Kiarostami
- Hector Babenco
- Garry Marshall
- Fyvush Finkel
- Arthur Hiller
- Gene Wilder
- Hugh O'Brian
- Curtis Hanson
- Robert Vaughn
- Alan Thicke
- Zsa Zsa Gabor
- George Michael
- Carrie Fisher
- Debbie Reynolds

== See also ==
- 22nd Critics' Choice Awards
- 23rd Screen Actors Guild Awards
- 37th Golden Raspberry Awards
- 70th British Academy Film Awards
- 89th Academy Awards
