= Florence Foster Jenkins (film) =

2016 film directed by Stephen Frears

- Theatrical release poster
- Directed by: Stephen Frears
- Written by: Nicholas Martin; Julia Kogan
- Produced by: Michael Kuhn; Tracey Seaward
- Starring: Meryl Streep; Hugh Grant; Simon Helberg; Rebecca Ferguson; Nina Arianda
- Cinematography: Danny Cohen
- Edited by: Valerio Bonelli
- Music by: Alexandre Desplat
- Production companies: Pathé; BBC Films; Qwerty Films; Canal+; Ciné+
- Distributed by: 20th Century Fox (United Kingdom); Pathé Distribution (France)
- Release dates: 23 April 2016 (Belfast Film Festival); 6 May 2016 (United Kingdom); 13 July 2016 (France)
- Running time: 110 minutes
- Countries: United Kingdom; France
- Language: English
- Budget: $29 million
- Box office: $56 million

Florence Foster Jenkins is a 2016 biographical comedy drama film directed by Stephen Frears and written by Nicholas Martin and Julia Kogan. It stars Meryl Streep as Florence Foster Jenkins, a New York heiress known for her generosity and poor singing. Hugh Grant plays her manager and long-time companion, St. Clair Bayfield. Other cast members include Simon Helberg, Rebecca Ferguson, and Nina Arianda.

Filming began in May 2015, and the premiere was held in London on 12 April 2016. The film was released on 6 May 2016 in the United Kingdom, 13 July in France and 12 August in the United States. At the 89th Academy Awards, it was nominated for Best Actress for Streep, which marked her 20th Oscar nomination, and Best Costume Design. The film also received four nominations at the 74th Golden Globe Awards, including Best Motion Picture – Musical or Comedy.

== Plot ==
In 1944, Florence Foster Jenkins is a New York City socialite heiress who founded the Verdi Club to celebrate her love of music. St. Clair Bayfield, a British Shakespearean actor, is her manager and long-time companion. Florence lives in a grand hotel suite, while Bayfield lives in an apartment with his mistress, Kathleen Weatherley. Florence suffers from long-term syphilis, contracted from her first husband, Frank Jenkins.

Florence decides to resume singing lessons after she sees Lily Pons in concert with Bayfield. She hires pianist Cosmé McMoon, who is shocked by her terrible singing, but Bayfield and vocal coach Carlo Edwards, the assistant conductor at the Metropolitan Opera, pretends she is wonderful. Bayfield warns McMoon of dire consequences if he criticizes her.

Bayfield arranges a small recital, handpicking the attendees. Loyal Verdi Club members watch respectfully, but others barely contain their laughter. Encouraged by her good reviews, she arranges to make a recording at Melotone as a Christmas gift for members of the Verdi Club. Florence gives McMoon a copy and recalls that Bayfield was an unsuccessful actor and that she hid negative reviews from him. She also informs McMoon of her history as a piano player and teacher, having once played for the President as a child. McMoon realizes that Florence is not as musically inept as he had thought.

Florence and McMoon write and perform original songs together. One song is broadcast on the radio, to the horror of Bayfield and Kathleen, though many listeners find it comedic and enjoy it. Florence informs Bayfield that she has booked Carnegie Hall for a performance and will give away a thousand tickets to soldiers. Bayfield fails to dissuade her. He gets into a fight with a group of men laughing at Florence and McMoon's song at a bar. Kathleen, resenting the lack of attention, leaves him.

McMoon confides to Bayfield that he fears that the recital will humiliate him and ruin his career. Bayfield replies that he gave up his acting career to support his wife and pressures McMoon do the same for his friend. McMoon reluctantly agrees to accompany Florence, though fully expecting to flop spectacularly at Carnegie Hall.

The concert is packed and attended by celebrities such as Cole Porter and Tallulah Bankhead. McMoon arrives late which unnerves Florence, but Bayfield and McMoon encourage her to go on—Florence then writes McMoon into her will backstage before the two go out onto the stage. When Florence begins singing, the soldiers laugh and shout. Her supporters and friends, however, scold them and cheer for her to keep singing. She continues her performance. However, New York Post columnist Earl Wilson tells Bayfield he will write a damning review and refuses his bribes.

Bayfield, with McMoon's help, buys every copy of the New York Post in the neighborhood and throws them away. Despite their best efforts, Florence hears about the review, retrieves a copy of the review from a trash can, and is so upset she collapses and becomes severely ill. As she is dying in bed, Florence imagines herself singing beautifully and taking a bow with McMoon and Bayfield to a standing ovation. She tells Bayfield that though people may say she could not sing, no one can say she did not sing, before dying peacefully.

== Cast ==
- Meryl Streep as Florence Foster Jenkins
- Hugh Grant as St. Clair Bayfield
- Simon Helberg as Cosmé McMoon
- Rebecca Ferguson as Kathleen Weatherley
- Nina Arianda as Agnes Stark
- Stanley Townsend as Phineas Stark
- Allan Corduner as John Totten
- Christian McKay as Earl Wilson
- David Haig as Carlo Edwards
- John Sessions as Dr. Hermann
- Bríd Brennan as Kitty
- John Kavanagh as Arturo Toscanini
- Pat Starr as Gertrude Vanderbilt Whitney
- Maggie Steed as Mrs. James O'Flaherty
- Thelma Barlow as Mrs. Oscar Garmunder
- Liza Ross as Mrs. E.E. Patterson
- Paola Dionisotti as Baroness Le Feyre
- Rhoda Lewis as Mrs. Patsy Snow
- Aida Garifullina as Lily Pons
- Nat Luurtsema as Tallulah Bankhead
- Ewan Stewart as Colonel
- Mark Arnold as Cole Porter
- Tunji Kasim as Private Smith
- Josh O'Connor as Donaghy
- Alex Elson as Walker/Photographer

== Production ==
=== Development ===
Prior to reading the Nicholas Martin and Julia Kogan script, Frears did not have much knowledge about Jenkins beyond the portrayal of her in the West End play Glorious! by Peter Quilter. On the strength of the script, Frears became interested and did research by watching various YouTube videos of her. Upon watching the videos Frears noted that "You’re laughing and she touches you. It’s inherently ridiculous and courageous at the same time." He and Streep were determined that despite the subject matter the audience should side with Florence. Frears did not envisage Streep in the role but after her name was brought up Frears agreed, noting that he thought it would be something fresh for her. Streep worked with a singing coach to help her prepare for the role of Jenkins. Frears praised her performance, stating "You can only sing badly if you are a good singer."

=== Casting ===
On 27 March 2015, Simon Helberg was set to play Cosmé McMoon, a pianist and the accompanist to Jenkins. Rebecca Ferguson was added to the cast on 1 April 2015. On 13 April 2015, Nina Arianda joined the film to play Agnes Stark, a showgirl struggling to move up into high society with the help of her husband.

=== Filming ===
Principal photography on the film began in May 2015 in London. Pathé released a first-look photo on 22 May, featuring Streep and Grant as Jenkins and Bayfield, respectively. Filming was done in Hoylake and Liverpool city centre.

Filming took place in Liverpool and the city was transformed into 1940s New York City, with Liverpool's Drury Lane being turned into Central Park West, where Streep and Grant were spotted filming in June 2015. Production concluded on 20 July 2015.

== Release ==
In September 2015, Paramount Pictures acquired U.S. distribution rights to the film. The film had its world premiere at the Belfast Film Festival on 23 April 2016. The film was theatrically released in the United Kingdom on 6 May 2016 and in the United States on 12 August 2016.

Florence Foster Jenkins was released on Digital HD on 29 November 2016 and on Blu-ray and DVD on 13 December 2016.

== Reception ==
=== Box office ===
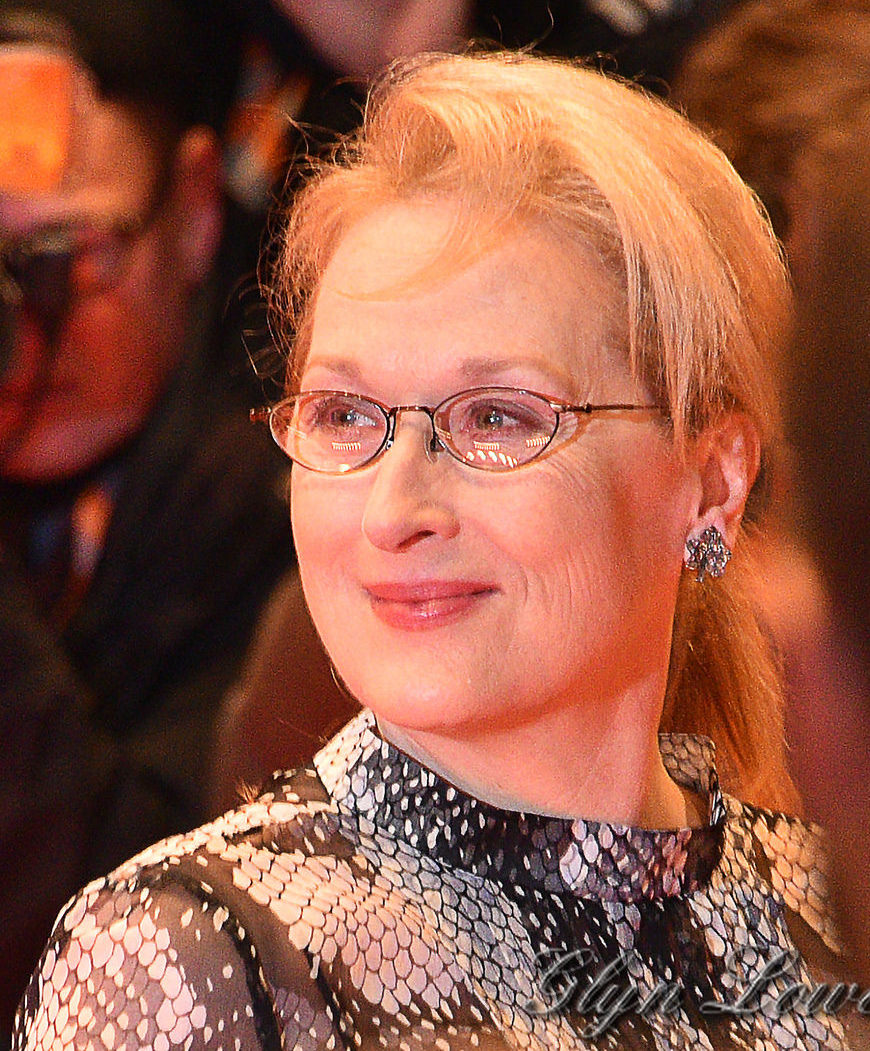
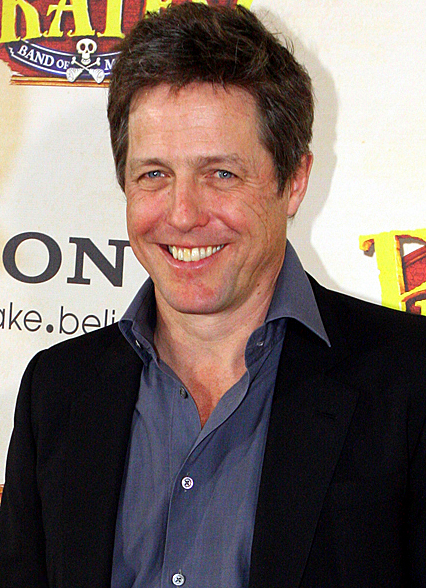
Meryl Streep and Hugh Grant's performances received praise from critics, with the former being nominated for the Academy Award for Best Actress.

As of 2 October 2016, Florence Foster Jenkins had grossed $27.4 million in North America and $28.6 million in other territories, for a worldwide total of $56 million. In the United States and Canada, Florence Foster Jenkins was released on 12 August 2016, against Pete's Dragon and Sausage Party, and was projected to gross $5–7 million from 1,500 theaters in its opening weekend. It went on to open to $6.6 million, finishing 8th at the box office.

=== Critical response ===
On the review aggregator website Rotten Tomatoes, 87% of 235 critics' reviews are positive, with an average rating of 7.1/10. The website's consensus reads: "Florence Foster Jenkins makes poignant, crowd-pleasing dramedy out of its stranger-than-fiction tale—and does its subject justice with a reliably terrific turn from star Meryl Streep." Metacritic, which uses a weighted average, assigned the film a score of 71 out of 100, based on 41 critics, indicating "generally favorable" reviews. Audiences polled by CinemaScore gave the film an average grade of "A−" on an A+ to F scale. Wai Chee Dimock, writing in the Los Angeles Review of Books, linked the film to Hamlet and The Magic Flute, saying that the film "is neither tragedy nor farce, but a passable admixture of the two, defining both negatively."

== Accolades ==
List of awards and nominations
Award	Date of ceremony	Category	Recipient(s)	Result	Ref(s)
AARP Annual Movies for Grownups Awards	6 February 2017	Best Comedy	Florence Foster Jenkins	Nominated	
AARP Annual Movies for Grownups Awards	6 February 2017	Best Actress	Meryl Streep	Nominated	
AARP Annual Movies for Grownups Awards	6 February 2017	Best Grownup Love Story	Meryl Streep and Star Streep	Nominated	
Academy Awards	26 February 2017	Best Actress	Meryl Streep	Nominated	
Academy Awards	26 February 2017	Best Costume Design	Consolata Boyle	Nominated	
British Academy Film Awards	12 February 2017	Best Actress in a Leading Role	Meryl Streep	Nominated	
British Academy Film Awards	12 February 2017	Best Actor in a Supporting Role	Hugh Grant	Nominated	
British Academy Film Awards	12 February 2017	Best Costume Design	Consolata Boyle	Nominated	
British Academy Film Awards	12 February 2017	Best Makeup and Hair	J. Roy Helland and Daniel Phillips	Won	
Costume Designers Guild Awards	21 February 2017	Excellence in Period Film	Consolata Boyle	Nominated	
Critics' Choice Awards	11 December 2016	Best Actor in a Comedy	Hugh Grant	Nominated	
Critics' Choice Awards	11 December 2016	Best Actress in a Comedy	Meryl Streep	Won	
Critics' Choice Awards	11 December 2016	Best Costume Design	Consolata Boyle	Nominated	
European Film Awards	10 December 2016	Best Actor	Hugh Grant	Nominated	
Evening Standard British Film Awards	8 December 2016	Best Actor	Hugh Grant	Won	
Evening Standard British Film Awards	8 December 2016	Technical Achievement	Consolata Boyle	Nominated	
Golden Globe Awards	8 January 2017	Best Motion Picture – Musical or Comedy	Florence Foster Jenkins	Nominated	
Golden Globe Awards	8 January 2017	Best Actor – Motion Picture Comedy or Musical	Hugh Grant	Nominated	
Golden Globe Awards	8 January 2017	Best Actress – Motion Picture Comedy or Musical	Meryl Streep	Nominated	
Golden Globe Awards	8 January 2017	Best Supporting Actor – Motion Picture	Simon Helberg	Nominated	
Golden Tomato Awards	12 January 2017	Best British Movie 2016	Florence Foster Jenkins	4th Place	
Golden Tomato Awards	12 January 2017	Best Musical/Music Movie 2016	Florence Foster Jenkins	3rd Place	
Hollywood Film Awards	6 November 2016	Hollywood Supporting Actor Award	Hugh Grant	Won	
Jupiter Awards	29 March 2017	Best International Actress	Meryl Streep	Nominated	
London Film Critics' Circle	22 January 2017	British/Irish Actor of the Year	Hugh Grant	Nominated	
Santa Barbara International Film Festival	3 February 2017	Virtuosos Award	Simon Helberg	Won	
Satellite Awards	19 February 2017	Best Actress	Meryl Streep	Nominated	
Satellite Awards	19 February 2017	Best Supporting Actor	Hugh Grant	Nominated	
Screen Actors Guild Awards	29 January 2017	Outstanding Performance by a Female Actor in a Leading Role	Meryl Streep	Nominated	
Screen Actors Guild Awards	29 January 2017	Outstanding Performance by a Male Actor in a Supporting Role	Hugh Grant	Nominated	
St. Louis Gateway Film Critics Association	18 December 2016	Best Comedy	Florence Foster Jenkins	Nominated	

== See also ==
- Marguerite, a 2015 French film inspired by the life of Jenkins
- Ironweed, a 1987 film in which Meryl Streep plays a character who also imagines herself a much more gifted singer than she is shown to truly be
- Glorious!, the Olivier Award–nominated 2005 West End stage comedy about Jenkins by Peter Quilter
- Souvenir, two-character play with music about Jenkins and McMoon starring Judy Kaye, written by Stephen Temperley
