= Edwin McArthur =

American classical music conductor, pianist and accompanist (1907-1987)

Edwin McArthur (24 September 1907 – 24 February 1987) was an American classical music conductor, pianist and accompanist. From 1935 until her retirement in 1955, he was the usual accompanist of the Norwegian soprano Kirsten Flagstad.

== Life and career ==
McArthur was born in Denver, Colorado and, having begun work as a professional pianist, studied piano at the Juilliard School and moved to New York as a music teacher and organist. He was married to his wife Blanche in 1930. He applied for a post to play for Flagstad soon after her debut at the Metropolitan Opera (which took place on 2 February 1935) and she chose him for her accompanist for her tour of that year. She encouraged him to study with her the repertoire of Scandinavian songs, especially those of Edvard Grieg. It was his custom to play accompaniments from memory.

He made his conducting debut during an Australian tour with her, in Sydney in 1938. In 1941, he became possibly the first American-born conductor to lead a work at the Metropolitan Opera House, conducting Flagstad and Lauritz Melchior in Tristan und Isolde. His readings were considered lyrical and expressive, and Flagstad insisted that he should direct performances wherever she went. McArthur championed American songs, and Flagstad recorded two of his own - "Night" and "We Have Turned Again Home" - in the early 1950s. He remained her conductor right through to her retirement in 1955, persuading her to make final appearances in Wagnerian scenes at her farewell concert at Carnegie Hall on 20 March 1955, for the benefit of the Symphony of the Air. He wrote a memoir of his work with Flagstad, published in 1960.

In 1946–47, he was connected with revivals of Sweethearts and Show Boat on Broadway. He was also associated with the singers Ezio Pinza and John Charles Thomas. He was the music director of the St. Louis Municipal Opera for 23 years. He conducted the Harrisburg (Pa.) Symphony 1950–1974, and from 1967 to 1972 he was director of the Eastman School of Music opera department. In 1976 he conducted Wagner's Die Walküre at the Teatro di San Carlo in Naples. He coached privately in later years; Hildegard Behrens studied with him before singing Brünnhilde in Wagner's Ring cycle.

Edwin McArthur died in 1987, survived by his wife.

His rumoured identity as Cosmé McMoon, the accompanist for Florence Foster Jenkins, was revealed in a 1991 radio interview. This gossip has been disproved by a number of sources, including Cosmé McMoon's living family and the New York Times's obituaries for both men.

== Writing ==
- E. McArthur, Flagstad: A Personal Memoir (Alfred A. Knopf, New York 1965, reprint 1980)

== Sources ==
- T. Page, Edwin McArthur, conductor and accompanist, dies at 79. (New York Times, 25 February 1987).
- N. Douglas, Kirsten Flagstad in Song (disc liner), (Nimbus Prima Voce NI 7871.)
