= Cosmé McMoon =

Mexican-American pianist and composer (1901-1980)

- Born: Cosmé McMunn; February 22, 1901; Mapimí, Mexico
- Died: August 22, 1980 (aged 79); San Antonio, Texas, U.S.
- Resting place: Sunset Memorial Park, San Antonio, Bexar County, Texas, U.S.
- Occupation: Musician

Cosmé McMunn (February 22, 1901 – August 22, 1980), who used the name Cosmé McMoon, was a Mexican-American pianist and composer, who worked as the accompanist to tone-deaf soprano Florence Foster Jenkins.

== Life and career ==
McMoon was born as Cosmé McMunn in 1901 in Mapimí, Mexico, the son of Maria (Valadez) and Cosme McMunn. His paternal grandparents were Irish and his mother was of Mexican descent. He moved with his family to San Antonio, Texas, around 1911. He moved to New York City around 1920 to further his musical studies, and likely adopted the McMoon spelling around that time. Jenkins met McMoon sometime in the 1920s, and knowing McMoon was a concert pianist, eventually asked him to help her prepare for her performances and accompany her.

Apart from giving occasional piano lessons, McMoon never achieved a career in music after Jenkins' death in 1944, and instead pursued a long interest in bodybuilding and judging bodybuilding contests. He was a master chess player and was fascinated with mathematics. He resided in New York City until shortly before his death in August 1980. He was diagnosed with pancreatic cancer and moved back to San Antonio, dying two days after arriving. His remains were cremated and his ashes rest at Sunset Memorial Park in San Antonio. He never married nor had any children.

== Legacy ==
McMoon was portrayed by actor Donald Corren in Souvenir, a play about Florence Foster Jenkins' career, which ran on Broadway in 2005 and has since been staged in many regional theaters.

He is portrayed by Simon Helberg in the 2016 film Florence Foster Jenkins. Helberg received a Golden Globe nomination for Best Supporting Actor for the role.

McMoon was also one of the main characters in Glorious!, a stage comedy by Peter Quilter which ran in London's West End in 2005 and has since been performed in 30 countries worldwide.
