= Flashback (1983 TV series) =

Australian game show

- Presented by: Keith Smith
- Country of origin: Australia
- Original language: English
- No. of series: 1
- No. of episodes: 9

Production
- Running time: 30 minutes

Original release
- Network: ABC TV
- Release: 11 February – 8 April 1983

Flashback is a 1983 Australian television panel game show broadcast on the Australian Broadcasting Corporation. Hosted by Keith Smith it featured a panel of three trying to guess the guest newsmakers, followed by the guests joining the panel for a chat. Panel members over the series were Richard Walsh, Buzz Kennedy, Jacki Weaver, Noeline Brown and Kate Fitzpatrick.

In the Sun-Herald Jacqueline Lee Lewes announced the show and wrote "The least said about this program the better. It's 1960s television — except that it's in colour." Mike Carlton in the Sydney Morning Herald wrote "With all this commercial codswallop going around you would think the ABC would have the wit to lay orf, but no, someone in Light Ent has devised a particular brand of frightfulness in the form of a panel game called Flashback, which his employers are inexplicably showing on Friday evenings." Also in the Sydney Morning Herald Marion MacDonald said "The very concept of the show ensures that it will be a dismal night's entertainment." The Age's Garrie Hutchinson noted "It's a further piece of evidence on the decline of Friday night television, which is now even worse than Saturday nights ever were." In the same masthead Michael Shmith gives a short summary and says "The whole show is twee and deeply embarrassing."
