= Would You Believe? (game show) =

Australian television game show

- Genre: Game show
- Presented by: Peter Lazar
- Country of origin: Australia
- Original language: English

Production
- Producer: Peter Vandrell

Original release
- Network: ABC
- Release: 1970 – 1974

Would You Believe? is an Australian television game show that ran from 1970 to 1974. It was made by the Australian Broadcasting Corporation (ABC) and the first episode screened on 5 February 1970. Each episode ran for 30 minutes and screened in black and white, on Sunday nights, at 7.30pm.

It was described as a "game of truth and/or lie about Australia's early days and ways". It featured two teams, each of three panellists, telling historical stories where two of the stories were fake. The panellists were required to ad-lib their stories based on photos and facts they were supplied before the show.

The chair of the show was Peter Lazar, who had a long career in advertising and public relations in Sydney. Two teams of three people took turns to tell stories about some person, event or place. Panel members for the first season were Len Evans, Carmen Duncan, Frank Hardy, Michael Baume, Jacki Weaver and Cyril Pearl with Noeline Brown replacing Duncan from the second season.
