= The Canterville Ghost (stage musical) =

The Canterville Ghost is a stage musical by Peter Quilter and Charles Miller, adapted from the 1887 short story of the same name by Oscar Wilde. The show premiered on the London Fringe in 1995 and was presented on a national tour of the UK in 1998 starring Ron Moody.

It was published by Samuel French Ltd.
