= St. Clair Bayfield =

English stage actor (1875–1967)

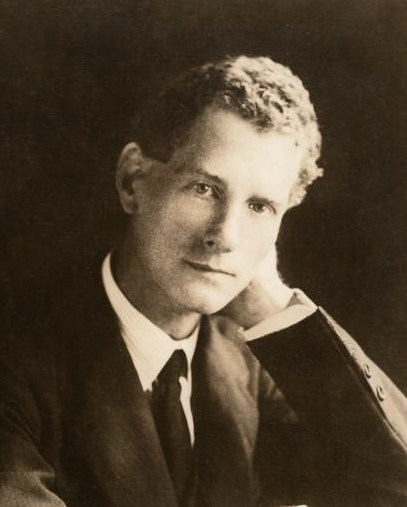
- Born: John St. Clair Roberts; 2 August 1875; Cheltenham, Gloucestershire, England
- Died: 19 May 1967 (aged 91); Larchmont, New York, U.S.
- Occupation: Stage actor
- Spouse: Kathleen Weatherley (m. 1945)
- Partner(s): Florence Foster Jenkins (1909–1944)

St. Clair Bayfield (born John St. Clair Roberts; 2 August 1875 – 19 May 1967) was an English stage actor, best known as the long-term companion and manager of amateur operatic soprano Florence Foster Jenkins.

== Life and career ==
Bayfield was born John St. Clair Roberts on 2 August 1875 in Cheltenham, England, the son of George Bayfield Roberts, an Oxford-educated country parson, and his wife Ida, the eldest of three illegitimate daughters of Edward Law, 1st Earl of Ellenborough, a prominent politician and Governor-General of India in the years preceding the Indian Mutiny. St. Clair's maternal great-grandfather was Lord Chief Justice of England.

With a fine voice and physical presence, he became involved in amateur theatricals, leading eventually to his joining a professional company touring Australia. His diary of time spent in Melbourne is included in the "Bayfield Archive" preserved at Lincoln Center, New York. He next acted with a company headed by the impresario William Ben Greet, who abandoned his cast to penury in a remote corner of the United States. That led to the establishment of Actors’ Equity, of which Bayfield was a founding member. His subsequent stage career involved regular appearances on Broadway for several decades, usually in works by British playwrights. In 1909, he began a vague "common law" relationship with amateur operatic soprano Florence Foster Jenkins, seven years his senior, that lasted the remainder of her life. The couple lived for many years in an apartment on 37th Street in Manhattan, New York. Bayfield joined the Ben Greet Players in a revival of Twelfth Night that took the troupe to 56 Pennsylvania towns in 65 days during the summer of 1914. Also in the group was Sydney Greenstreet.

Bayfield lived with Jenkins and managed her career for 36 years. After Jenkins' death in 1944, he married a piano teacher, Kathleen Weatherley, in 1945. They lived in Larchmont, New York, where he died in 1967.

== Achievements ==
The Actors' Equity Association bestows the annual St. Clair Bayfield Award upon an actor or actress in a non-featured role in a Shakespearean production.

== Theatre credits ==
Bayfield's credits in Broadway theatre include:

Production	Role	Dates of Production
For Heaven's Sake, Mother! (Original, Play, Comedy)	Henry Wheeler	16–20 November 1948
Hand in Glove (Original, Play, Thriller)	Mr Forsythe	4 December 1944 – 6 January 1945
The Night Before Christmas (Original, Play)	Endicott	10–27 April 1941
The Old Foolishness (Original, Play)	The Canon	20–21 December 1940
Day in the Sun (Original, Play, Comedy)	Judge Livingstone	16 May - May 1939
Jeremiah (Original, Play)	Nahum	3 February – March 1939
Glorious Morning (Original, Play, Drama)	Rutzstein	26 November – December 1938
Father Malachy's Miracle (Original, Play, Comedy)	Robert Gillespie, Bishop of Milothian	17 November 1937 – March 1938
Field of Ermine (Original, Play)	The Duke of Santa Olalla	8 February – February 1935
Judgment Day (Original, Play, Drama)	Count Leonid Slatarski	12 September – December 1934
They Shall Not Die (Original, Play, Drama)	Att'y General Cheney	21 February – April 1934
Criminal at Large (Original, Play, Mystery)	Rawbane	10 October 1932 – February 1933
Wild Waves (Original, Play, Comedy)	Whelpley	19 February – March 1932
The Lady with a Lamp (Original, Play, Drama)	Dr Sutherland	19 November – November 1931
Old Man Murphy (Revival, Play, Comedy)	Hopkins	14 September - October 1931
London Calling (Original, Play, Comedy)	Staight	18 October - October 1930
Lady Dedlock (Original, Play, Romance, Melodrama)	Sir Leicester Dedlock	31 December 1928 – February 1929
Escape (Original, Play)	The Captain; The Laborer	26 October 1927 – March 1928
The Beaten Track (Original, Play)	Dafydd Evans Y Beddau	8 February - February 1926
A Bit of Love (Original, Play, Drama)	Trustaford	12 May - May 1925
Two By Two (Original, Play, Comedy)	E. Lorrilard Price	23 February – March 1925
Lass O'Laughter (Original, Play, Comedy)	Davie Nicholson	8 January - February 1925
We Moderns (Original, Play, Comedy)	Sir William Wimple	11 March - March 1924
The Lady Cristilinda (Original, Play, Comedy)	Father Reaney	25 December 1922 – January 1923
Bulldog Drummond (Original, Play, Melodrama)	Jas. Handley	26 December 1921 – May 1922
Deburau (Original, Play, Comedy, Tragedy)	A Journalist	23 December 1920 – June 1921
By Pigeon Post (Original, Play)	Blondel	25 November - December 1918
The Wild Duck (Original, Play, Drama)		11 March - April 1918
As You Like It (Revival, Play, Comedy)		8-9 February 1918
The Merchant of Venice (Revival, Play, Comedy)		25-26 January 1918
Colonel Newcome (Original, Play)		10 April - May 1917
Hamlet (Revival, Play, Tragedy)	Polonius	23 April 1912
Hans, the Flute Player (Original, Musical, Opera)		20 September – 26 November 1910
The King of Cadonia (Original, Musical, Comedy)	Laborde	10–22 January 1910
The Debtors (Original, Play)		12 October – October 1909
The Prima Donna (Original, Musical, Comedy, Opera)	Colonel Dutois	30 November 1908 – 30 January 1909
The Merchant of Venice (Revival, Play, Comedy)		4 March 1907 – (unknown)
The Two Mr Wetherbys (Original, Play, Comedy)		23 August - September 1906
Twelfth Night (Revival, Play, Comedy)		22 February – March 1904
Everyman (Original, Play)		12 October 1902 – May 1903

== In the media ==
Bayfield’s relationship with Jenkins was the basis for the biographical drama Florence Foster Jenkins, with Hugh Grant portraying Bayfield and Meryl Streep portraying Jenkins. The film, directed by Stephen Frears, premiered in London on 12 April 2016.
