= Florence Foster Jenkins =

American soprano (1868–1944)

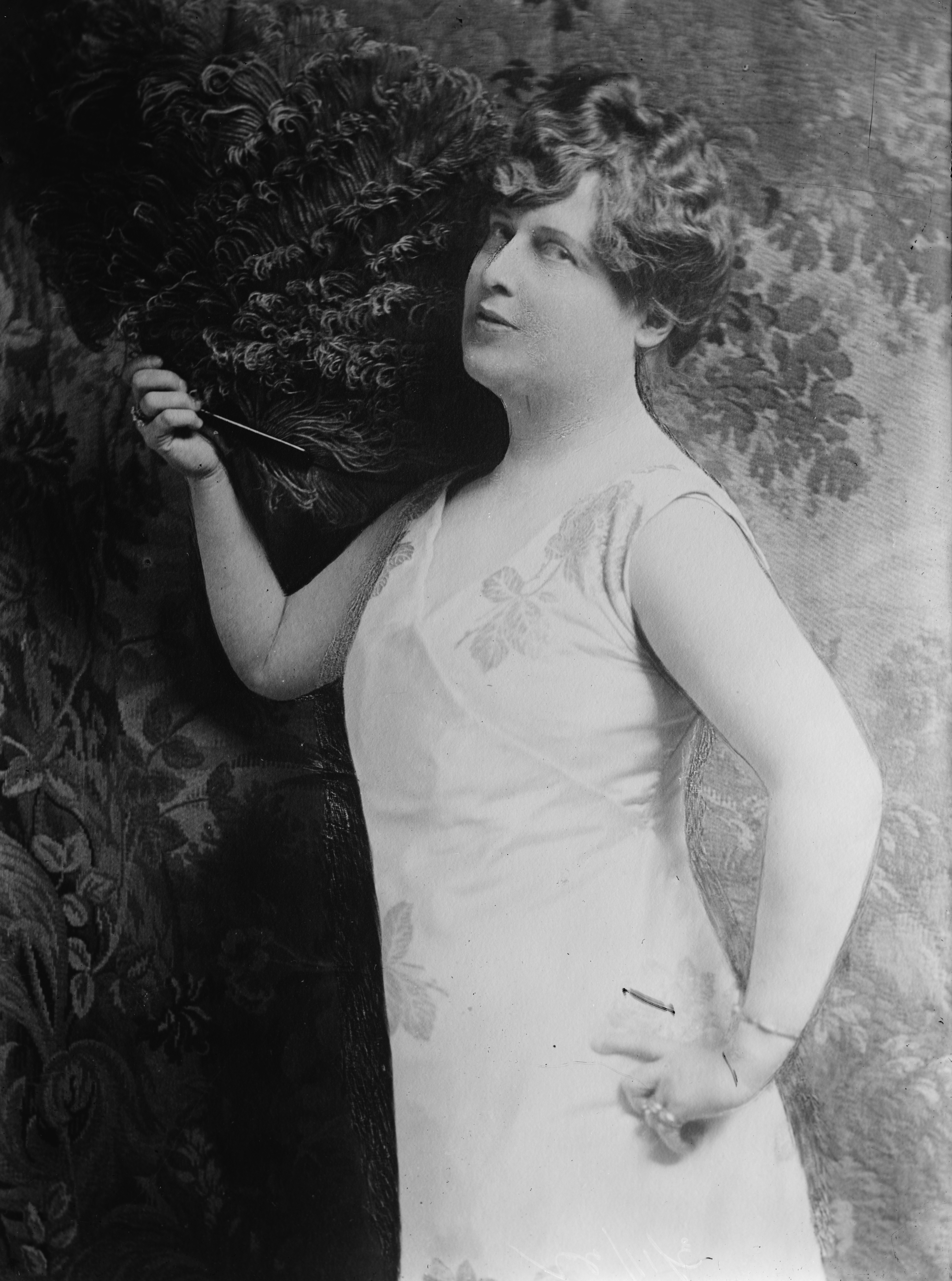
- Born: Narcissa Florence Foster; July 19, 1868; Wilkes-Barre, Pennsylvania, U.S.
- Died: November 26, 1944 (aged 76); New York City, U.S.
- Occupations: Amateur singer, socialite
- Years active: 1912–1944
- Spouse: Frank Thornton Jenkins (m. 1883; sep. 1886)
- Partner: St. Clair Bayfield (1909–1944)

Florence Foster Jenkins (born Narcissa Florence Foster; (Note: One reference, Encyclopaedia Britannica, lists her first name as "Nascina", but according to all others, including the 1870 Federal Census, it is "Narcissa".) July 19, 1868 – November 26, 1944) was an American socialite and amateur soprano who became known and mocked for her flamboyant performance costumes and notably poor singing ability. Stephen Pile, in his book The Book of Heroic Failures, ranked her "the world's worst opera singer ... No one, before or since, has succeeded in liberating themselves quite so completely from the shackles of musical notation."

Despite—or perhaps because of—her technical incompetence, she became a prominent musical camp cult figure in New York City during the 1920s, 1930s, and 1940s. Cole Porter, Gian Carlo Menotti, Lily Pons, Sir Thomas Beecham, and other celebrities were among her fans. Enrico Caruso reportedly "regarded her with affection and respect."

The poet William Morris Meredith Jr. wrote that a Jenkins recital "was never exactly an aesthetic experience, or only to the degree that an early Christian among the lions provided aesthetic experience; it was chiefly immolatory, and Madame Jenkins was always eaten, in the end."

== Personal life and early career ==
Narcissa Florence Foster was born July 19, 1868, in Wilkes-Barre, Pennsylvania, the daughter of Charles Dorrance Foster, an attorney and scion of a wealthy land-owning Pennsylvania family, and Mary Jane Hoagland Foster. Her only sibling, a younger sister named Lillian, died of diphtheria in 1883 at age eight.

Foster said her interest in public performance began when she was seven years old. A pianist, she performed at society functions as "Little Miss Foster", and she gave a recital at the White House during the administration of Rutherford B. Hayes. She attended the Moravian Seminary for Young Ladies in Bethlehem, Pennsylvania, from September 1881 to March 1882, where she was among 20 students in the "Fourth Room". In December, Foster performed "Two Merry Alpine Maids", a "gay duet, with yodel and 'la la' passages", as part of the annual Christmas service. In a little under a year at the Bethlehem Female Seminary, she paid over $100 (equivalent to $3,336 in 2025) for music instruction and sheet music. Foster's interest in music was further evidenced by her purchase of hymnals.

After graduating from high school, her hopes of studying music in Europe were dashed when her father refused permission and funding. On July 11, 1883, ten days after the funeral of her sister and eight days before her 15th birthday, Foster married Francis "Frank" Thornton Jenkins (1852–1917), a physician 16 years her senior, in Philadelphia. (In the 1880s, the age of consent for marriage in Pennsylvania was ten.) The following year, after learning that she had contracted syphilis from her husband, she ended their relationship and reportedly never spoke of him again. Years later, she claimed to have been granted a divorce decree on March 24, 1902, but no documentation of any such ruling has been found. She retained the Jenkins surname for the remainder of her life.

After an arm injury ended her aspirations as a pianist, Jenkins gave piano lessons at her apartment in Philadelphia, The Newport, built in 1897. Around 1900, she moved with her mother to New York City. In 1909, in her early forties, Jenkins met a 33-year-old British actor named St. Clair Bayfield (1875–1967); they began a vaguely defined cohabitation relationship that continued the rest of her life. Upon her father's death later that year, Jenkins became the beneficiary of a sizable trust, and resolved to resume her musical career as a singer with Bayfield as her manager. She began taking voice lessons and immersed herself in wealthy New York City society, joining dozens of social clubs. As the "chairman of music" for many of these organizations, she began producing lavish tableaux vivants, popular events in upper-crust social circles of that era. In each of these productions, Jenkins would cast herself as the main character in the final tableau, wearing an elaborate costume of her own design. In a widely republished photograph, Jenkins poses in a costume, complete with angelic wings, from her tableau inspired by Howard Chandler Christy's painting Stephen Foster and the Angel of Inspiration.

Jenkins began giving private vocal recitals in 1912 when she was 44 years old. In 1917, she became founder and President Soprano Hostess of her own social organization, the Verdi Club. Its membership quickly swelled to over 400; honorary members included Enrico Caruso and Geraldine Farrar. When Jenkins's mother died in 1930, additional financial resources became available for the expansion and promotion of her singing career.

== Vocal career ==
"Der Hölle Rache" ("Queen of the Night" aria)
Jenkins singing "Der Hölle Rache" from Mozart's The Magic Flute

According to published reviews and other contemporary accounts, Jenkins's proficiency at the piano did not translate well to her singing. She is described as having great difficulty with such basic vocal skills as pitch, rhythm, and sustaining notes and phrases. In recordings, her accompanist Cosmé McMoon can be heard making adjustments to compensate for her constant tempo variations and rhythmic mistakes, but there was little he could do to conceal her inaccurate intonation. She was consistently flat, sometimes considerably so. Her diction was similarly substandard, particularly with foreign-language lyrics.

The difficult operatic arias that Jenkins chose to perform—all well beyond her technical ability and vocal range—served only to emphasize these deficiencies. "There's no way to even pedagogically discuss it," said vocal instructor Bill Schuman. "It's amazing that she's even attempting to sing that music." The opera impresario Ira Siff, who dubbed her "the anti-Callas", said, "Jenkins was exquisitely bad, so bad that it added up to quite a good evening of theater ... She would stray from the original music, and do insightful and instinctual things with her voice, but in a terribly distorted way. There was no end to the horribleness ... They say Cole Porter had to bang his cane into his foot in order not to laugh out loud when she sang. She was that bad." Nevertheless, Porter rarely missed a recital.

Whether "Lady Florence"—as she liked to be called, and often signed her autographs—was in on the joke, or honestly believed she had vocal talent, remains a matter of debate. On the one hand, she compared herself favorably with renowned sopranos Frieda Hempel and Luisa Tetrazzini, and seemed oblivious to the abundant audience laughter during her performances. Her loyal friends endeavored to disguise the laughter with cheers and applause; they often described her technique to curious inquirers in "intentionally ambiguous" terms. For example, "her singing at its finest suggests the untrammeled swoop of some great bird". Favorable articles and bland reviews, published in specialty music publications such as The Musical Courier, were most likely written by her friends or herself. "I would say that she maybe didn't know [how badly she sang]," said mezzo-soprano Marilyn Horne. "We can't hear ourselves as others hear us." Nerve damage due to syphilis and its treatment (see below) may have physically compromised her hearing as well.

On the other hand, Jenkins refused to open her performances to the general public, and was clearly aware of her detractors. "People may say I can't sing," she once remarked to a friend, "but no one can ever say I didn't sing." She dismissed her original accompanist, Edwin McArthur, after catching him giving her audience "a knowing smile" during a performance. She went to great lengths to control access to her private recitals, which took place at her apartment, in small clubs, and each December at the Verdi Club's annual "Ball of the Silver Skylarks" in the Ritz-Carlton Hotel's Grand Ballroom. Attendance, by personal invitation only, was restricted to her loyal clubwomen and a select few others. Jenkins handled distribution of the coveted tickets herself, carefully excluding strangers, particularly music critics. "There's no way she could not have known," said Schuman. "No one is that unaware ... she loved the audience reaction and she loved singing. But she knew."

Despite her careful efforts to insulate her singing from public exposure, a majority of critics favored the view that Jenkins's self-delusion was genuine. "At that time Frank Sinatra had started to sing, and the teenagers used to faint during his notes and scream," McMoon told an interviewer. "So she thought she was producing the same kind of an effect." "Florence didn't think she was pulling anyone's leg," said opera historian Albert Innaurato. "She was compos mentis, not a lunatic. She was a very proper, complex individual." As an anonymous obituary writer later put it, "Her ears, schooled in constant introversion, heard only the radiant tones which never issued forth to quell the mirth of her audiences."

Her recitals featured arias from the standard operatic repertoire by Mozart, Verdi, and Johann Strauss; lieder by Brahms; Valverde's Spanish waltz "Clavelitos" ("Little Carnations"); and songs composed by herself and McMoon. As in her tableaus, she complemented her performances with elaborate costumes of her own design, often involving wings, tinsel, and flowers. She would perform "Clavelitos" dressed as Carmen, complete with castanets and a wicker basket of flowers, clicking the castanets and tossing the flowers one by one. When she ran out of flowers, she flung the basket too—and then the castanets. Her fans, aware that "Clavelitos" was her favorite song, would usually demand an encore, prompting her to send McMoon into the audience to retrieve flowers, basket, and castanets so that she could sing the number again.

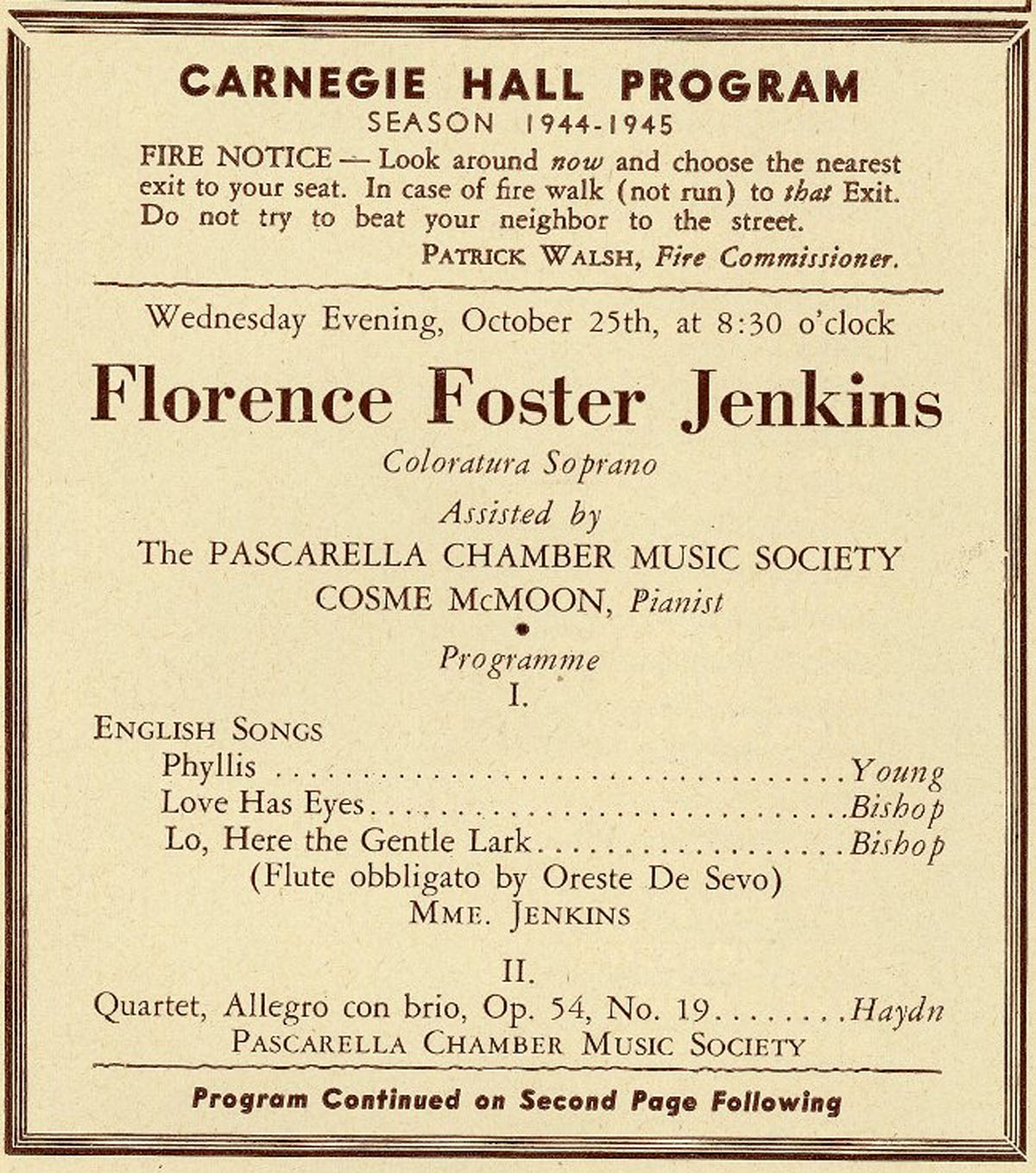

Once, when a taxi in which she was riding collided with another car, Jenkins let out a high-pitched scream. Upon arriving home, she went immediately to her piano and confirmed (at least to herself) that the note she had screamed was the fabled F above high C, a pitch she had never before been able to reach. Overjoyed, she refused to press charges against either involved party, and even sent the taxi driver a box of expensive cigars. McMoon said neither he "nor anyone else" ever heard her actually sing a high F, however.

At age 76, Jenkins finally yielded to public demand and booked Carnegie Hall for a general-admission performance on October 25, 1944. Tickets sold out weeks in advance; the demand was such that an estimated 2,000 people were turned away at the door of the 2,800-seat venue. Numerous celebrities attended, including Porter, Marge Champion, Gian Carlo Menotti, Kitty Carlisle, and Lily Pons with her husband, Andre Kostelanetz, who composed a song for the recital. McMoon later recalled a moment: "[When she sang] 'If my silhouette does not convince you yet / My figure surely will' [from Adele's aria in Die Fledermaus], she put her hands righteously to her hips and went into a circular dance that was the most ludicrous thing I have ever seen. And created a pandemonium in the place. One famous actress had to be carried out of her box because she became so hysterical."

Since ticket distribution was out of Jenkins's control for the first time, mockers, scoffers, and critics could no longer be kept at bay. The following morning's newspapers were filled with scathing, sarcastic reviews that devastated Jenkins, according to Bayfield. "[Mrs. Jenkins] has a great voice," wrote the New York Sun critic. "In fact, she can sing everything except notes ... Much of her singing was hopelessly lacking in a semblance of pitch, but the further a note was from its proper elevation the more the audience laughed and applauded." The New York Post was even less charitable: "Lady Florence ... indulged last night in one of the weirdest mass jokes New York has ever seen."

Five days after the concert, Jenkins suffered a heart attack while shopping at G. Schirmer's music store, and died a month later on November 26, 1944, at her Manhattan residence, the Hotel Seymour. She was buried next to her father in the Foster mausoleum, Hollenback Cemetery, Wilkes-Barre, Pennsylvania.

Jenkins was inducted into the Luzerne County Arts & Entertainment Hall of Fame in 2025.

=== Possible influence of health problems ===
Some of Jenkins's performance difficulties have been attributed to untreated syphilis, which causes progressive deterioration of the central nervous system in its tertiary stage. Nerve damage and other morbidities caused by the disease may have been compounded by toxic side effects—such as hearing loss—from mercury and arsenic, the prevailing (and largely ineffective) remedies of the pre-antibiotic era. By the time penicillin became generally available in the 1940s, Jenkins's disease had progressed to the tertiary stage, which is unresponsive to antibiotics.

== Recordings ==
=== Audio ===
The only professional audio recordings of Jenkins consist of nine selections on five 78-rpm records (Melotone Recording Studio, New York City, 1941–1944), produced by Jenkins, at her expense, and sold to her friends at $2.50 (Note: $2.50 was a considerable sum – equivalent to approximately $45 in 2019 – at a time when a typical phonograph record sold for 25 to 50 cents.) a copy. The selections include four coloratura arias from operas by Mozart, Delibes, Johann Strauss II, and Félicien David, and five art songs, two written for Jenkins by her accompanist, Cosmé McMoon. Seven of the selections were released on RCA Victor LRT-7000, a 10-inch LP in 1954, and reissued on RCA Victor LM-2597, a 12-inch LP in 1962, The Glory (????) of the Human Voice (includes the non-Jenkins recording of A Faust Travesty by Jenny Williams and Thomas Burns). In 1983, the 1962 LP was reissued with revised cover art on the RCA Gold Seal label, AGM1-4808.

- A-side
1. Mozart: "Queen of the Night aria", from The Magic Flute (in English)
2. Liadoff: "The Musical Snuff-Box" (English version by Adele Epstein)
3. McMoon: "Like a Bird" (words by Jenkins)
4. Delibes: "Bell Song", from Lakmé (in French)
5. David: "Charmant oiseau" (with flute and piano), from La perle du Brésil (in French)
6. Bach/Pavlovich: "Biassy" (based on the prelude from Bach's Prelude and Fugue in G minor, BWV 861, words by Alexander Pushkin, in Russian)
7. Johann Strauss II: "Mein Herr Marquis" (Adele's Laughing Song) from Die Fledermaus (English version by Lorraine Noel Finley)
- B-side A Faust Travesty (from Gounod's Faust), Jenny Williams (soprano), Thomas Burns (piano)
1. "Valentine's Aria" (Ere I leave my native land)
2. "Jewel Song" (O heavenly jewels)
3. "Salut, demeure" (Emotions strange)
4. Final Trio (My heart is overcome with terror, sung as a duet)

The material has since been reissued in various combinations on four CDs:

- The Glory (????) of the Human Voice (RCA Victor Gold Seal, OCLC 968787814, 1992), a reissue of the 1962 RCA Victor album (including A Faust Travesty) with the song "Serenata Mexicana" by McMoon added.
- The Truly Unforgettable Voice of Florence Foster Jenkins RCA Red Seal 88985319622, 2016), remastered, same contents as previous RCA Victor CD but includes a short interview with Cosmé McMoon
- Florence Foster Jenkins & Friends: Murder on the High C’s (1937-1951). (Naxos Nostalgia, OCLC 58399998, 2003) includes high quality transfers of all nine professionally recorded Jenkins songs from her original Mellotone Studios sessions recorded in New York City between 1941 and 1944, plus "Valse Caressante" by McMoon, along with eight selections from other artists.
- The Muse Surmounted: Florence Foster Jenkins and Eleven of Her Rivals (Homophone Records, OCLC 58399998, 2004) includes one Jenkins song, "Valse Caressante", plus a brief interview with McMoon.

=== Film ===
Jenkins commissioned filming of her performances at the Verdi Club's signature annual event, the "Ball of the Silver Skylarks", held each October at the Ritz Carlton Hotel. All were thought lost until copies of the 1934 through 1939 and 1941 films were discovered in 2009. Jenkins historian Donald Collup presented excerpts from the films in a 2016 YouTube video and announced plans to produce a documentary, which as of 2026 has not been released.

== In popular culture ==
=== Stage productions ===
- Precious Few, a play about Jenkins and the English novelist Ronald Firbank, by Terry Sneed, premiered in 1994 at Wildwood Park for the Performing Arts in Little Rock, Arkansas.
- Goddess of Song, a one-woman play by South African playwright Charles J. Fourie, performed by Carolyn Lewis, was staged in 1999 at the Coffee Lounge in Cape Town, South Africa.
- Viva La Diva, by Chris Ballance, debuted in 2001 at the Edinburgh Fringe.
- Souvenir: a Fantasia on Florence Foster Jenkins, by Stephen Temperley, opened off-Broadway at the York Theatre in 2004 with Jack Lee as Cosme McMoon and Judy Kaye as Jenkins. After an interim engagement at the Berkshire Theater Festival, it opened on Broadway at the Lyceum Theater in 2005, directed by Vivian Matalon and starring Donald Corren and Judy Kaye. Kaye summarized the difficulties of her role: "It's hard work to sing badly well. You could sing badly badly for a while, but you'll hurt yourself if you do it for long."
- Glorious!, by Peter Quilter, opened in 2005 in London's West End with Maureen Lipman starring as Jenkins. It was nominated for an Olivier Award as Best New Comedy, and has since been performed in more than 40 countries in 27 languages.

=== Films ===
- The biographical documentary Florence Foster Jenkins: A World of Her Own was released in 2007.
- The 2015 French feature film Marguerite was loosely inspired by Jenkins's life and career.
- Florence Foster Jenkins, a British biopic starring Meryl Streep in the title role, was directed by Stephen Frears and premiered in London on April 12, 2016, and in New York on August 12, 2016. Streep was widely praised for her portrayal, and was nominated for the Academy Award for Best Actress.

=== Other media ===
- In Red Dead Redemption 2, the character Chester Damsen is said to be based on Florence Foster Jenkins.
- Anne McCaffrey's 1994 short piece "Euterpe on a Fling" is a fictional interview with Jenkins that drew from facts known about her life and career.
- Jenkins was the subject of the "Not My Job" segment of NPR's radio program Wait Wait... Don't Tell Me! on October 25, 2009. NBC news anchor Brian Williams, the show's special guest, was asked a series of trivia questions about Jenkins, whom he nicknamed "Flo Fo". The broadcast took place in Carnegie Hall on the 65th anniversary of her performance there.
