= Adele's Laughing Song =

Aria from the operetta Die Fledermaus by Johann Strauss II

"Mein Herr Marquis", sometimes called "Adele's Laughing Song", is an aria for soprano with choral accompaniment from act 2 of the operetta Die Fledermaus by Johann Strauss II. It appears in many anthologies of music for soprano singers, and is frequently performed in recitals.

Adele, a chambermaid who has borrowed one of her mistress's gowns without permission, and gone to a party, also without permission, gets recognized there by her mistress's husband. She attempts to convince him that he is wrong by laughing scornfully at the idea that a glamorous woman like herself could possibly be a lowly chambermaid.
