= Peter Quilter =

English playwright

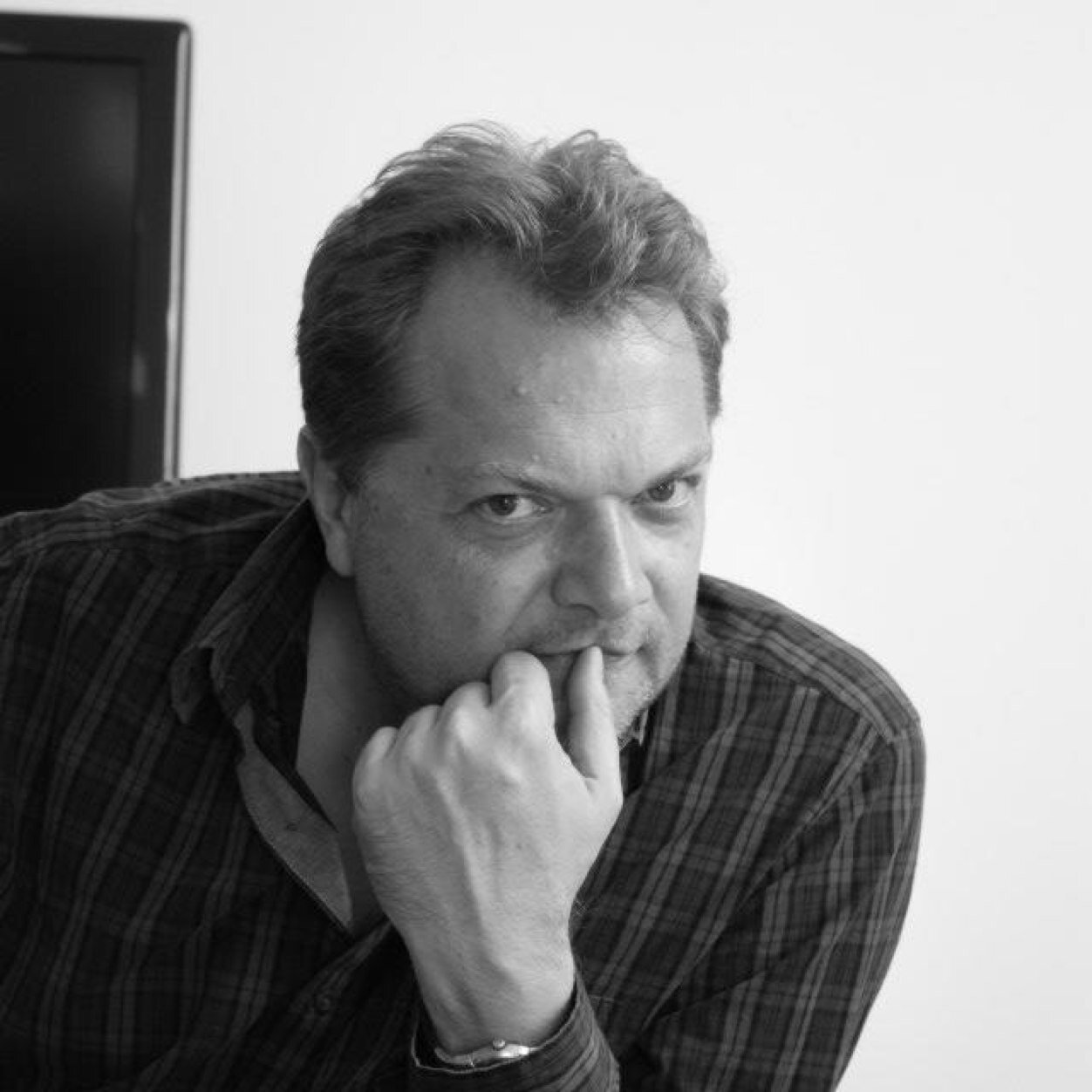
Image of the playwright Peter Quilter

Peter Quilter is a British West End and Broadway playwright whose plays have been translated into 30 languages and performed in over 40 countries. He is best known for his Broadway play End of the Rainbow, which was adapted for the Oscar-winning film Judy (2019), starring Renée Zellweger. He is also author of the West End comedy Glorious! about the amateur opera singer Florence Foster Jenkins. Peter has twice been nominated for the Olivier Award (Best New Comedy and Best New Play) and his Broadway debut was nominated for 3 Tony Awards.

== Early life ==
Quilter was born in Colchester, England and is an honours graduate of Leeds University. He began his writing career from his home in Greenwich, London where he lived for 14 years before emigrating to the Spanish Canary Islands.

== Early career ==
He started his career as a television presenter on BBC TV. He was a presenter of the Children's BBC programme Playdays and also appeared as an actor on a number of TV series including London's Burning. His first play was an all-female comedy Respecting Your Piers and he followed this with The Canterville Ghost a musical adaptation of Oscar Wilde's The Canterville Ghost which played a number one tour of the UK starring Ron Moody.

== International success ==
In 1999, Quilter made his West End debut with a comedy about the pop industry, BoyBand. The show played a summer season at the Gielgud Theatre and later enjoyed success in South Africa, Denmark, Estonia, Poland, and on a 60-venue tour of the Netherlands. It is currently playing at the Divadlo Nova Scena in Bratislava and recently had its Asian premiere in Tokyo Japan.

In 2005, Quilter had a bigger international hit with End of the Rainbow, a musical drama about the final months in the life of Judy Garland. It premiered at the Sydney Opera House in Australia (winning Caroline O'Connor two Best Actress awards), and also had an award-winning run at the 2006 Edinburgh Festival. The following year, Joop van den Ende presented a new Dutch production, which played a seven-month tour of the Netherlands culminating in performances at the Royal Theatre Carré in Amsterdam. The show then enjoyed runs in the Czech Republic, Finland, Poland and New Zealand. A new UK production opened in February 2010 at the Royal Theatre in Northampton, directed by Terry Johnson, designed by William Dudley and starring Tracie Bennett. The show transferred to London's West End on 16 November, playing at the Trafalgar Theatre. The show opened to great critical acclaim and was featured on the front cover of The Times newspaper. The play ended its six-month run in May 2011. The show received nominations for 4 Laurence Olivier Awards – Best Actress, Best Supporting Actor, Best Sound and Best New Play.

A new Spanish production opened at the Teatro Marqina in Madrid in January 2011, followed by a German production at the Hamburger Kammerspiele in June 2011 and a Brazilian production in Rio de Janeiro directed by Moeller-Botelho. In January 2012, the show had its USA debut at the Guthrie Theater in Minneapolis, prior to a run on Broadway at the Belasco Theatre, which began previews on 19 March. The production opened to excellent reviews, ran for 176 performances and received three Tony Award nominations including Best Actress for Bennett. The show continues to be produced frequently around the world and has had successful runs in Buenos Aires, Chicago, Montreal, Mexico City, Tokyo, Los Angeles, Krakow, Berlin, Adelaide, Tel Aviv, Rome, Prague, Moscow and Amsterdam amongst many other cities. The movie Judy is an adaptation of the play. Pathé and the BBC produced the film, released in 2019, directed by Rupert Goold, and starring Renée Zellweger and Michael Gambon. Zellweger won the Oscar for Actress in a leading role. She also won the SAG, BAFTA and Golden Globe award for her performance as Judy Garland.

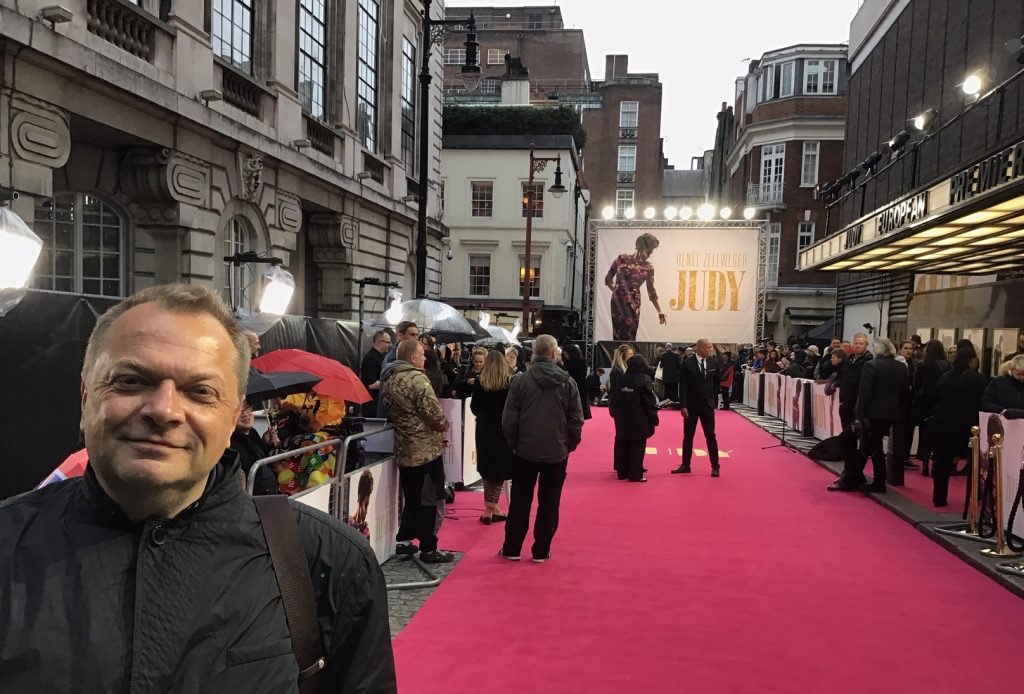
Peter Quilter at the London premiere of JUDY

Quilter's other major hit Glorious! also received its debut production in 2005, opening at Birmingham Repertory Theatre and transferring in November 2005 to the Duchess Theatre in the West End of London. The production starred the much loved comedy actress Maureen Lipman, was directed by Alan Strachan and produced by impresario Michael Codron. Glorious! told the story of Florence Foster Jenkins, the worst singer in the world. It ran in London for six months and over 200 performances. The play was nominated for the Laurence Olivier Award as Best New Comedy. Glorious! made its North American debut at Theatre Calgary and had its first foreign language production at the Helsinki City Theatre, under the title Suurenmoista!

Glorious! has since played in over 30 countries to an estimated audience of two million people. In 2008 Quilter created a three-actor version which premiered at the Fulton Opera House, Philadelphia and also played to great success in Rio de Janeiro and Madrid. One of the most popular productions has been in Poland ("Boska") starring the legendary Krystyna Janda. The production has visited Chicago and New York, has toured to all major polish cities, and been broadcast live on national television. In recent years, new productions have opened in Bratislava, Caracas, Vienna, Kiev, Belgrade, Riga, Johannesburg, Budapest and Toronto.

In 2016 his 3-actor play 4000 Days opened at the Park Theatre in London starring Alistair McGowan, Daniel Weyman and Maggie Ollerenshaw. The play has had further productions in Hamburg, Sao Paulo, Pennsylvania, Prague and Chicago. It toured throughout Germany in 2019 and again in 2022.

In 2020, his comedy The Hill had its premiere at the Divadlo Ungelt in Prague and in 2021, his 2-actor comedy Snowbound had its premiere productions on national tours of Russia and Italy. His all-female show Step By Step made its debut in various countries in 2022, including runs in Barcelona and Madrid and a national tour of Holland. Meanwhile his 2-actor comedy Duets has played in 20 countries and has been running for over two years in Brazil. His latest play The Dating Game will have premiere productions in the 2024/25 season in Warsaw, Prague, Rio de Janeiro and Berlin.

== Other works ==
His other work includes –

The Morning After a modern comedy about love, sex and relationships.

The Actress a theatrical comedy which had its world premiere in Rio de Janeiro in May 2015.

Saving Jason a new black comedy which had its London premiere at the Park Theatre in 2016.

Celebrity filmed for Polish TV as Rodzinny Show and performed on stage in Sweden, Denmark, the Czech Republic and Canada.

Just the Ticket a one-woman comedy, which had its world premiere at Australia's Ensemble Theatre in February 2011.

Curtain Up! an all-female comedy which has played in many European countries.

The Nightingales a comedy with music which Premiered at the Contra Kreiss Theater in Bonn Germany in 2012.
