= Glorious! (stage comedy) =

2005 stage comedy performance by Peter Quilter

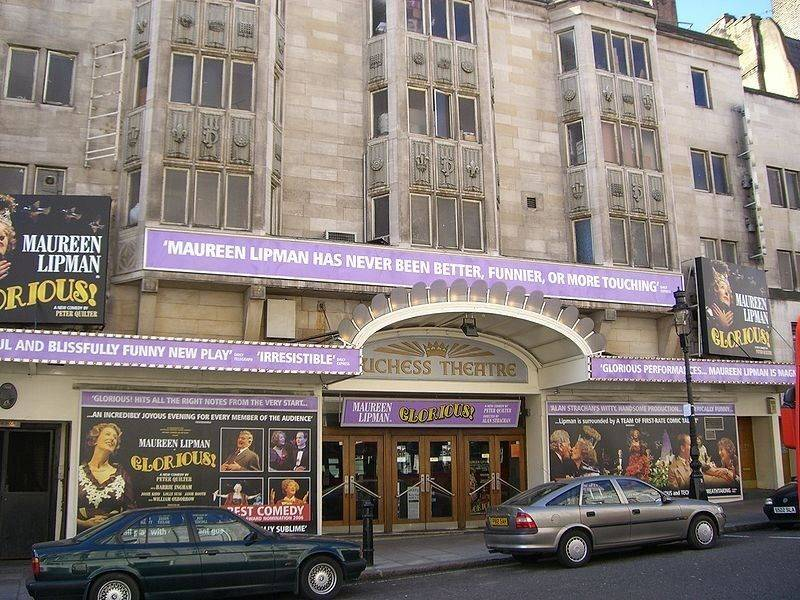
The Duchess Theatre during the London production of "Glorious!" in 2005

Glorious! is a 2005 stage comedy by Peter Quilter, telling the story of Florence Foster Jenkins, "the worst singer in the world". The show premiered at Birmingham Repertory Theatre, followed by a UK tour. The production transferred to London's West End in November 2005. This premiere production starred Maureen Lipman who was made a Dame in 2020. It ran for 6 months at the Duchess Theatre and was nominated for the Laurence Olivier Award for Best New Comedy. It has since played in 35 countries and been translated into more than 20 languages.

The comedy is based on the true story of Florence Foster Jenkins, a New York City socialite and amateur singer who could not carry a tune but was convinced she was a great singer. She performed mostly privately for trusted friends, so that she would not be mocked, and made recordings. Ultimately, at the age of 76, she gave a legendary public performance in Carnegie Hall in New York.

The British website This Is Theatre said, "Based upon a true story, the play spins from Florence's charity recitals and extravagant balls, through to her bizarre recording sessions and an ultimate triumph at Carnegie Hall in this hilarious and heart-warming comedy." The website quoted reviews from major British publications: "A lunaticly funny comedy". (The Sunday Times) "An affectionate tribute to a 22-carat eccentric... Glorious! is just that." (The Sun) "In Peter Quilter's touching play, starring Maureen Lipman, what begins as a joke becomes a lesson in how to live your dream." (The Daily Express) A review in the British Theatre Guide described the play as "an interesting portrait of an eccentric American woman who, despite her patent lack of ability to sing, was firmly convinced of her greatness as a soprano singer."

Since its London premiere, the comedy has been produced throughout the world, including runs in Australia, New Zealand, South Africa, Japan, Israel, Brazil, Venezuela, the United States, Canada, Iceland, Sweden, Germany, Austria, Italy, Czechia, Poland, Estonia, Slovenia, Finland, Turkey, Greece, Russia, Ukraine, Romania, Serbia, Croatia, Hungary, Switzerland, Slovakia, Spain and Cyprus. Stage productions have also twice been broadcast live on television - in Japan and Poland.
