= List of Castle Rock Entertainment films =

This is a list of films produced or distributed by Castle Rock Entertainment. With a few notable exceptions, the pre-1994 films are currently distributed by Metro-Goldwyn-Mayer (MGM), while most films released post-1994 are distributed by Warner Bros.

== 1989–1990s ==
Release date	Title	Notes	Distributor(s)
April 14, 1989	Winter People	uncredited; co-production with Nelson Entertainment	Columbia Pictures (United States and Canada theatrical); Rank Film Distributors (U.K. and Ireland); Hoyts Distribution (Australia and New Zealand); Concorde Entertainment Group (Benelux)
July 21, 1989	When Harry Met Sally...	co-production with Nelson Entertainment	Columbia Pictures (United States and Canada theatrical); Palace Pictures (U.K. and Ireland); Hoyts Distribution (Australia and New Zealand); Egmont Film (Scandivania)
March 16, 1990	Lord of the Flies	co-production with Nelson Entertainment	Columbia Pictures (United States and Canada theatrical); Palace Pictures (U.K. and Ireland); Hoyts Distribution (Australia and New Zealand); Egmont Film (Scandivania); Concorde Entertainment Group (Benelux)
October 12, 1990	The Spirit of '76	uncredited; co-production with Commercial Pictures	Columbia Pictures
October 26, 1990	Sibling Rivalry	co-production with Nelson Entertainment	Columbia Pictures (United States and Canada theatrical and France); Medusa Communications (U.K. and Ireland); Hoyts Distribution (Australia and New Zealand); Egmont Film (Scandivania); Concorde Entertainment Group (Benelux)
November 30, 1990	Misery	co-production with Nelson Entertainment	Columbia Pictures (United States and Canada theatrical); Medusa Communications (U.K. and Ireland); Hoyts Distribution (Australia and New Zealand); Egmont Film (Scandivania); Concorde Entertainment Group (Benelux)
June 7, 1991	City Slickers	co-production with Nelson Entertainment	Columbia Pictures (United States and Canada); First Independent Films (U.K. and Ireland); Roadshow Entertainment (Australia and New Zealand); Egmont Film (Scandivania); Concorde Entertainment Group (Benelux)
September 20, 1991	Late for Dinner	co-production with New Line Cinema; Granite Pictures	Columbia Pictures (United States and Canada); First Independent Films (U.K. and Ireland); Roadshow Entertainment (Australia and New Zealand); Concorde Entertainment Group (Benelux)
April 24, 1992	Year of the Comet	co-production with New Line Cinema	Columbia Pictures (United States and Canada)
August 28, 1992	Honeymoon in Vegas	co-production with New Line Cinema	Columbia Pictures (United States and Canada); First Independent Films (U.K. and Ireland); Roadshow Entertainment (Australia and New Zealand); Egmont Film (Scandivania); Concorde Entertainment Group (Benelux)
September 23, 1992	Mr. Saturday Night	co-production with New Line Cinema; Face Productions	Columbia Pictures (United States and Canada); First Independent Films (U.K. and Ireland); Roadshow Entertainment (Australia and New Zealand); Concorde Entertainment Group (Benelux)
December 11, 1992	A Few Good Men		Columbia Pictures
March 5, 1993	Amos & Andrew	co-production with New Line Cinema	Columbia Pictures (United States and Canada); Rank Film Distributors (U.K. and Ireland); Roadshow Entertainment (Australia and New Zealand)
July 9, 1993	In the Line of Fire		Columbia Pictures
August 27, 1993	Needful Things	co-production with New Line Cinema	Columbia Pictures (United States, Canada and Japan); Rank Film Distributors (U.K. and Ireland); Roadshow Entertainment (Australia and New Zealand); United International Pictures (Germany); Concorde Entertainment Group (Benelux); UGC Distribution (France)
October 1, 1993	Malice	co-production with New Line Cinema	Columbia Pictures (United States and Canada); Rank Film Distributors (U.K. and Ireland); Roadshow Entertainment (Australia and New Zealand); United International Pictures (Germany); Svensk Filmindustri and Egmont Film (Scandivania); Concorde Entertainment Group (Benelux); UGC Distribution (France)
November 24, 1993	Josh and S.A.M.	co-production with New Line Cinema	Columbia Pictures (United States and Canada); Rank Film Distributors (U.K. and Ireland); Roadshow Entertainment (Australia and New Zealand); Concorde Entertainment Group (Benelux)
June 10, 1994	City Slickers II: The Legend of Curly's Gold		Columbia Pictures
June 29, 1994	Little Big League		Columbia Pictures (United States and Canada); Rank Film Distributors (U.K. and Ireland); Roadshow Entertainment (Australia and New Zealand)
July 22, 1994	North	co-production with New Line Cinema	Columbia Pictures (North and Latin America, Germany and Austria); Rank Film Distributors (U.K. and Ireland); Roadshow Entertainment (Australia and New Zealand); Cecchi Gori Group; Warner Bros. Pictures (Italy); Intersonic (Czech Republic)
July 29, 1994	Barcelona		Fine Line Features (United States and Canada); Rank Film Distributors (U.K. and Ireland); Roadshow Entertainment (Australia and New Zealand); Columbia TriStar Film Distributors International (Latin America, Benelux and Asia excluding Japan)
September 23, 1994	The Shawshank Redemption		Columbia Pictures (United States, Canada and Scandivania); Rank Film Distributors (U.K. and Ireland); PolyGram Filmed Entertainment Distribution (Benelux); Roadshow Entertainment (Australia and New Zealand); Intersonic (Czech Republic)
January 27, 1995	Before Sunrise	Detour Filmproduction	Columbia Pictures (North and Latin America, Benelux, Australia, New Zealand and Asia excluding Japan); Rank Film Distributors (U.K. and Ireland); Svensk Filmindustri (Scandivania)
March 19, 1995	For Better or Worse		Columbia Pictures (North and Latin America, Benelux and Asia excluding Japan); Rank Film Distributors (U.K. and Ireland); Roadshow Entertainment (Australia and New Zealand)
March 24, 1995	Dolores Claiborne		Columbia Pictures (North and Latin America, Benelux, Italy, Australia, New Zealand and Asia excluding Japan); Rank Film Distributors (U.K. and Ireland); Svensk Filmindustri (Scandivania)
May 19, 1995	Forget Paris		Columbia Pictures (North and Latin America, Benelux, Australia, New Zealand and Asia excluding Japan); Rank Film Distributors (U.K. and Ireland); Svensk Filmindustri (Scandivania)
August 25, 1995	Beyond Rangoon		Columbia Pictures (North and Latin America, Benelux, Italy and Asia excluding Japan); Rank Film Distributors (U.K. and Ireland); Svensk Filmindustri (Scandivania); Roadshow Entertainment (Australia and New Zealand)
September 22, 1995	The Run of the Country		Columbia Pictures (North and Latin America, Benelux, Australia, New Zealand and Asia excluding Japan); Rank Film Distributors (U.K. and Ireland)
November 17, 1995	The American President		Columbia Pictures (United States); Universal Pictures (International)
December 15, 1995	Othello		Columbia Pictures (North and Latin America, Benelux, Australia, New Zealand and Asia excluding Japan); Rank Film Distributors (U.K. and Ireland); Medusa Film (Italy); Svensk Filmindustri (Scandivania); Alta Films (Spain)
December 22, 1995	Dracula: Dead and Loving It		Columbia Pictures (United States, Canada, Australia and New Zealand); PolyGram Filmed Entertainment (U.K. and Ireland); Sonet Film (Scandivania)
February 16, 1996	A Midwinter's Tale		Sony Pictures Classics (North and Latin America, Australia, New Zealand and Asia excluding Japan); Rank Film Distributors (U.K. and Ireland); Svensk Filmindustri (Scandivania)
February 16, 1996	City Hall		Columbia Pictures (North and Latin America, Benelux, Australia, New Zealand and Asia excluding Japan); Rank Film Distributors (U.K. and Ireland); Svensk Filmindustri (Scandivania)
June 21, 1996	Lone Star		Sony Pictures Classics (North and Latin America, Benelux, Australia, New Zealand and Asia excluding Japan); Rank Film Distributors (U.K. and Ireland); Medusa Film (Italy); Svensk Filmindustri (Scandivania)
June 28, 1996	Striptease		Columbia Pictures (North and Latin America, Scandivania, Benelux, Australia, New Zealand and Asia excluding Japan); Rank Film Distributors (U.K. and Ireland)
August 14, 1996	Alaska		Columbia Pictures (North and Latin America, Benelux, Australia, New Zealand and Asia excluding Japan); Rank Film Distributors (U.K. and Ireland); Medusa Film (Italy)
August 23, 1996	The Spitfire Grill	co-production with Gregory Productions	Columbia Pictures (North and Latin America, Scandivania, Benelux, Australia, New Zealand and Asia excluding Japan); Rank Film Distributors (U.K. and Ireland); Medusa Film (Italy)
September 27, 1996	Extreme Measures		Columbia Pictures (North and Latin America, Scandivania, Benelux, Australia, New Zealand and Asia excluding Japan); Rank Film Distributors (U.K. and Ireland); Medusa Film (Italy)
December 20, 1996	Ghosts of Mississippi		Columbia Pictures (North and Latin America, Benelux, Australia, New Zealand and Asia excluding Japan); Rank Film Distributors (U.K. and Ireland)
December 25, 1996	Hamlet		Columbia Pictures (North and Latin America, Benelux, Australia, New Zealand and Asia excluding Japan); Rank Film Distributors (U.K. and Ireland); Egmont Film (Scandivania)
December 25, 1996	Some Mother's Son		Columbia Pictures (North and Latin America, Benelux, Australia, New Zealand and Asia excluding Japan); Rank Film Distributors (U.K. and Ireland); Svensk Filmindustri (Scandivania)
January 31, 1997	Waiting for Guffman		Sony Pictures Classics (North America theatrical, Latin America, Australia, New Zealand and Asia excluding Japan)
February 7, 1997	SubUrbia	co-production with Detour Filmproduction	Sony Pictures Classics (North America theatrical, Latin America, Australia, New Zealand and Asia excluding Japan); Rank Film Distributors (U.K. and Ireland)
February 14, 1997	Absolute Power		Columbia Pictures (North America theatrical, Latin America, Benelux, Australia, New Zealand and Asia excluding Japan); Rank Film Distributors (U.K. and Ireland); Warner Bros. Pictures (Scandinavia and Japan); Filmayer (Spain); Fivia (Czech Republic)
January 30, 1998	Zero Effect		Columbia Pictures (North America theatrical, Latin America, Benelux, Germany, Austria, Australia, New Zealand and Asia excluding Japan); Warner Bros. Pictures (U.K., Ireland and France)
February 20, 1998	Palmetto		Columbia Pictures (North America theatrical, Latin America, France, Australia, New Zealand and Asia excluding Japan); Warner Bros. Pictures (U.K. and Ireland)
April 10, 1998	My Giant		Columbia Pictures (North America theatrical, Benelux, France, Germany, Austria, Australia, New Zealand and Asia excluding Japan); Warner Bros. Pictures (U.K. and Ireland)
April 17, 1998	Sour Grapes		Columbia Pictures (North America theatrical, Latin America, Germany, Austria, Australia, New Zealand and Asia excluding Japan); Warner Bros. Pictures (U.K. and Ireland)
May 29, 1998	The Last Days of Disco	co-production with PolyGram Filmed Entertainment, Westerly Films	Gramercy Pictures (United States); PolyGram Filmed Entertainment (Canada, Australia and New Zealand); Warner Bros. Pictures (International)
August 20, 1999	Mickey Blue Eyes	co-production with PolyGram Filmed Entertainment	Warner Bros. Pictures (North and Latin America, Scandivania, Turkey and Asia excluding Japan); GAGA-Humax (Japan); Universal Pictures (Worldwide excluding Latin America, Scandivania, Turkey and Asia excluding Japan)
October 15, 1999	The Story of Us	co-production with PolyGram Filmed Entertainment	Universal Pictures (United States, Canada, Australia and New Zealand); Warner Bros. Pictures (International)
December 10, 1999	The Green Mile	co-production with PolyGram Filmed Entertainment, Darkwoods Productions	Warner Bros. Pictures (North and Latin America, Scandivania, Turkey and Asia excluding Japan); GAGA-Humax (Japan); Universal Pictures (Worldwide excluding Latin America, Scandivania, Turkey and Asia excluding Japan)

== 2000s ==
Release date	Title	Notes	Distributor(s)
September 15, 2000	Bait		Warner Bros. Pictures
September 29, 2000	Best in Show		Warner Bros. Pictures
October 13, 2000	Lost Souls		New Line Cinema
December 8, 2000	Proof of Life	co-production with Bel-Air Entertainment	Warner Bros. Pictures (Worldwide); Pathé (France)
December 22, 2000	Miss Congeniality	co-production with Fortis Films and Village Roadshow Pictures	Warner Bros. Pictures (Worldwide excluding Australia, Greece and Singapore); Roadshow Entertainment (Australia, Greece and Singapore)
September 28, 2001	Hearts in Atlantis	co-production with Village Roadshow Pictures	Warner Bros. Pictures (Worldwide excluding Australia, Greece and Singapore); Roadshow Entertainment (Australia, Greece and Singapore)
December 21, 2001	The Majestic	co-production with Village Roadshow Pictures and Darkwoods Productions	Warner Bros. Pictures (Worldwide excluding Australia, Greece and Singapore); Roadshow Entertainment (Australia, Greece and Singapore)
April 19, 2002	Murder by Numbers		Warner Bros. Pictures
April 26, 2002	The Salton Sea	co-production with Darkwoods Productions	Warner Bros. Pictures
August 16, 2002	The Adventures of Pluto Nash	co-production with Village Roadshow Pictures	Warner Bros. Pictures (Worldwide excluding Australia, Greece and Singapore); Roadshow Entertainment (Australia, Greece and Singapore)
December 20, 2002	Two Weeks Notice	co-production with Fortis Films and Village Roadshow Pictures	Warner Bros. Pictures (Worldwide excluding Australia, Greece and Singapore); Roadshow Entertainment (Australia, Greece and Singapore)
January 17, 2003	Kangaroo Jack	co-production with Jerry Bruckheimer Films	Warner Bros. Pictures
March 21, 2003	Dreamcatcher	co-production with Village Roadshow Pictures	Warner Bros. Pictures (Worldwide excluding Australia, Greece and Singapore); Roadshow Entertainment (Australia, Greece and Singapore)
April 16, 2003	A Mighty Wind		Warner Bros. Pictures
April 30, 2004	Envy	co-production with Baltimore Pictures/Spring Creek Pictures	DreamWorks Pictures (United States); Columbia Pictures (International)
July 2, 2004	Before Sunset	co-production with Detour Filmproduction	Warner Independent Pictures (United States and Canada); Warner Bros. Pictures (International)
November 10, 2004	The Polar Express	co-production with Shangri-La Entertainment, ImageMovers, Playtone and Golden Mean Productions	Warner Bros. Pictures
November 16, 2004	Kangaroo Jack: G'Day U.S.A.!	Direct-to-video; co-production with Warner Bros. Animation	Warner Home Video
March 24, 2005	Miss Congeniality 2: Armed and Fabulous	co-production with Fortis Films and Village Roadshow Pictures	Warner Bros. Pictures (Worldwide excluding Australia, Greece and Singapore); Roadshow Entertainment (Australia, Greece and Singapore)
November 22, 2006	For Your Consideration	co-production with Shangri-La Entertainment	Warner Independent Pictures
February 14, 2007	Music and Lyrics	co-production with Village Roadshow Pictures and Reserve Room	Warner Bros. Pictures (Worldwide excluding Australia, Greece and Singapore); Roadshow Entertainment (Australia, Greece and Singapore)
April 20, 2007	Fracture		New Line Cinema (United States); Alliance Atlantis (Canada); Warner Bros. Pictures (Germany, Switzerland, Eastern Europe and Russia); Entertainment Film Distributors (United Kingdom); Svensk Filmindustri (Scandivania); RCV Entertainment (Netherlands); Kinepolis Film Distribution (Belgium); Roadshow Entertainment (Australia)
April 20, 2007	In the Land of Women		Warner Bros. Pictures
July 27, 2007	No Reservations	Village Roadshow Pictures	Warner Bros. Pictures (Worldwide excluding Australia, Greece and Singapore); Roadshow Entertainment (Australia, Greece and Singapore)
October 12, 2007	Michael Clayton	Summit Entertainment, Samuels Media, Section Eight Productions and Mirage Enterprises; studio credit only	Warner Bros. Pictures (United States and Canada); Pathé (United Kingdom); Roadshow Entertainment (Australia); Nu Metro Films (South Africa); SND Films (France); Constantin Film (Germany); Medusa Film (Italy); Svensk Filmindustri (Scandivania); Independent Films (Netherlands); Les Films de la Memoire (Belgium); DeAPlaneta (Spain); ZON Lusomundo (Portugal); Monolith Media (Poland); Ro-Image 2000 (Romania); SPI International (Czech Republic); Budapestfilm (Hungary); Film Europe (Slovakia)
October 12, 2007	Sleuth	Riff Raff Productions and Timnick Films	Sony Pictures Classics (United States, Canada, France, Italy, Scandivania and Spain); Paramount Pictures (United Kingdom and Australia); Christian Art Distributors (South Africa); Concorde Filmverleih (Germany); Filmladen (Austria); RCV Entertainment (Netherlands); LNK Audiovisuals (Portugal); ACME Film (Baltics); Hollywood Classic Entertainment (Czech Republic); Forum-Hungary (Hungary)
April 11, 2008	Chaos Theory	Lone Star Film Group	Warner Bros. Pictures
December 18, 2009	Did You Hear About the Morgans?	Relativity Media and Banter Films; studio credit only	Columbia Pictures

== 2010s ==
Release date	Title	Co-Producer	Distributor(s)
August 6, 2010	Flipped		Warner Bros. Pictures
November 24, 2010	Faster	State Street Pictures; studio credit only	CBS Films (United States); TriStar Pictures (International)
July 22, 2011	Friends with Benefits	Zucker Productions and Olive Bridge Entertainment; studio credit only	Screen Gems
July 6, 2012	The Magic of Belle Isle	Revelations Entertainment, Summer Magic and Firebrand	Magnolia Pictures
May 24, 2013	Before Midnight	Detour Filmproduction and Venture Forth; studio credit only	Sony Pictures Classics
July 11, 2014	And So It Goes	Foresight Unlimited and Envision Entertainment	Clarius Entertainment
October 8, 2014	The Rewrite	Reserve Room	Image Entertainment, RLJ Entertainment
May 6, 2016	Being Charlie	Jorva Entertainment Productions and Defiant Pictures	Paladin
November 3, 2017	LBJ	Acacia Entertainment, Savvy Media Holdings and Star Thrower Entertainment	Electric Entertainment, Vertical Entertainment
July 13, 2018	Shock and Awe	Acacia Entertainment and Savvy Media Holdings	Vertical Entertainment

== 2020s ==
Release date	Title	Co-Producer	Distributor(s)
November 11, 2023	Albert Brooks: Defending My Life	HBO Documentary Films and Final Cut Partners	HBO
September 12, 2025	Spinal Tap II: The End Continues		Bleecker Street (United States); Stage 6 Films (International; through Sony Pictures Releasing International)

== Upcoming films ==
- Daughter of the Bride
- Pure
- Wind River: The Next Chapter

== Television shows ==
With the exception of Seinfeld, Thea, The Powers That Be and Boston Common (owned by Sony Pictures Television), all shows are owned by Warner Bros. Television Studios.

Title	Creator(s)	Years active	Co-Produced by	Original Network(s)	Notes
Heart and Soul	David Nichols	1988		NBC	TV pilot
Past Imperfect		1988		NBC	TV pilot
Seinfeld	Larry David & Jerry Seinfeld	1989-1998	Giggling Goose Productions, West/Shapiro Productions, Fred Barron Productions, and distribution handled by Sony Pictures Television with ancillary rights to Warner Bros. Television Studios	NBC	
The Ed Begley Jr. Show	Tom Straw	1989		CBS	TV pilot
Julie Brown: The Show	Anne Beatts, Eve Brandstein, Julie Brown, and Charlie Coffey	1989		CBS	TV pilot
Homeroom	Andrew Scheinman & Gary Gilbert	1989		ABC	
Ann Jillian	Deidre Fay & Stuart Wolpert	1989-1990		NBC	
New Attitude	Shelly Garrett, Jack Elinson, Maiya Williams, Tom Straw, and Ralph Farquhar	1989		ABC	TV pilot
Partners in Life	Dick Blasucci & Joe Flaherty	1990		CBS	TV pilot, redeveloped the following year into Morton & Hayes
Morton & Hayes	Phil Mishkin & Rob Reiner	1991		CBS	
My Old School		1991		CBS	TV pilot
Sessions	Billy Crystal	1991		HBO	Miniseries
Please Watch the Jon Lovitz Special	Jon Lovitz & Alan Zweibel	1992		Fox	TV special
The Powers That Be	David Crane & Marta Kauffman	1992	ELP Communications and Columbia Pictures Television	NBC/USA	
Great Scott!	Tom Gammill & Max Pross	1992	Claverly One Productions	Fox	
Thea	Bernie Kukoff	1993-1994	Columbia Pictures Television	ABC	
The Second Half	John Mendoza	1993-1994		NBC	
But... Seriously		1993		Showtime	TV special
Days Like This	Lisa Amsterdam	1994		CBS	TV pilot
704 Hauser	Norman Lear	1994		CBS	
But Seriously '94		1994		Showtime	TV special
Nowhere Fast	Joshua Beckett	1995		CBS	TV pilot
The Single Guy	Brad Hall	1995-1997	Hall of Production (Season 1) and NBC Productions	NBC	
Pistol Pete	John Swartzwelder	1996		Fox	
The Lazarus Man	Dick Beebe	1996		TNT	
Boston Common	Max Mutchnick & David Kohan	1996-1997	KoMut Entertainment and Columbia TriStar Television	CBS	
The Army Show	J.J. Wall	1998		The WB	
Reunited	Mark Alton Brown & Dee LaDuke	1998		UPN	
You're the One	Julia Newton	1998		The WB	
Mission Hill	Bill Oakley & Josh Weinstein	1999-2002	Film Roman, Bill Oakley/Josh Weinstein Productions	The WB	
Movie Stars	Wayne Lemon	1999-2000		The WB	
The Michael Richards Show	Spike Feresten, Gregg Kavet, Michael Richards, and Andy Robin	2000		NBC	
Zero Effect	Walon Green & Jake Kasdan	2001	Warner Bros. Television	NBC	TV pilot
Lucky	Mark Cullen and Rob Cullen	2003		FX	
The Seinfeld Story		2004		NBC	TV special
