= Gesine Bullock-Prado =

American attorney and pastry chef

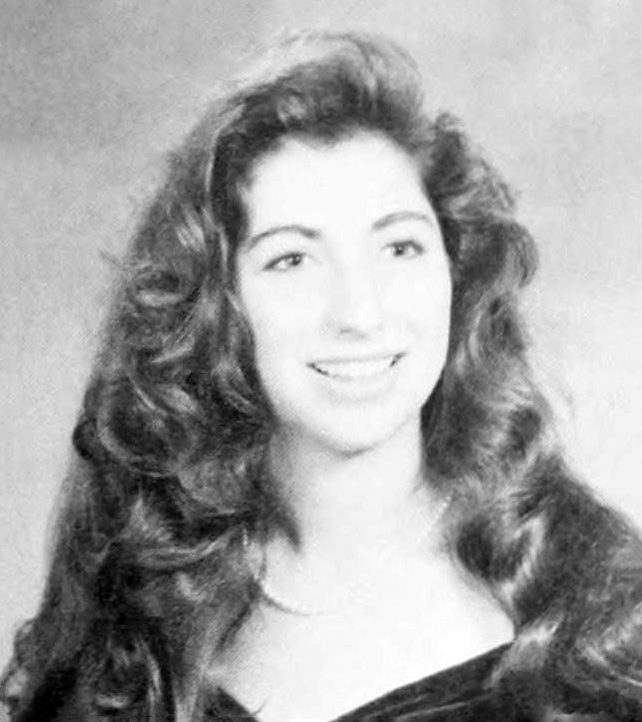
- Bullock in 1988
- Born: Gesine Bullock; March 6, 1970 (age 56); Washington, D.C., U.S.
- Education: University of Virginia; Southwestern Law School
- Occupations: Chef; author; attorney; television personality; producer
- Spouse: Raymond Prado (m. 1999)
- Relatives: Sandra Bullock (sister)

Gesine Bullock-Prado (born March 6, 1970) is an American pastry chef, TV personality, author, attorney, and former film executive.

== Life and career ==
Bullock-Prado was born in Washington, D.C. Her father, John Wilson Bullock (1925–2018), was a United States Army employee and voice coach; her German mother, Helga Mathilde Meyer (1942–2000), was an opera singer who sang at the Staatstheater Nürnberg and the Salzburg Festival and taught voice at the Mary Washington College. Bullock attended the University of Virginia and Southwestern Law School, and became a licensed attorney in 1997.

She joined the production company Fortis Films in 1995 with her sister, actress Sandra Bullock. As the company's lawyer and president, Bullock-Prado co-produced the films Gun Shy and Miss Congeniality 2: Armed and Fabulous, and helped develop dozens of others, including Practical Magic, Miss Congeniality, and the series The George Lopez Show.

In 2004, Bullock-Prado left the film industry and relocated to Vermont. From 2005 to 2008, she owned a bakery, Gesine Confectionary, in Montpelier; she then became a pastry instructor at her own baking school in Hartford, Vermont, Sugar Glider Kitchen, and at King Arthur Baking Company, formerly the King Arthur Flour Company. She also hosts the Food Network's Baked in Vermont, and appears as a judge on Beat Bobby Flay, Christmas Cookie Challenge, and Worst Cooks.

Bullock-Prado authored several books, including Confections of a Closet Master Baker (2009) aka My Life from Scratch (2010) – which she dedicated to her mother, and the cookbooks Sugar Baby (2011), Pie It Forward (2012), Bake It Like You Mean It (2013), Let Them Eat Cake (2016), Fantastical Cakes (2018), and My Vermont Table (2023).

== Personal life ==
She has been married to storyboard artist Raymond Prado since April 3, 1999.
