= Gracie Lawrence =

American actress and singer (born 1997)

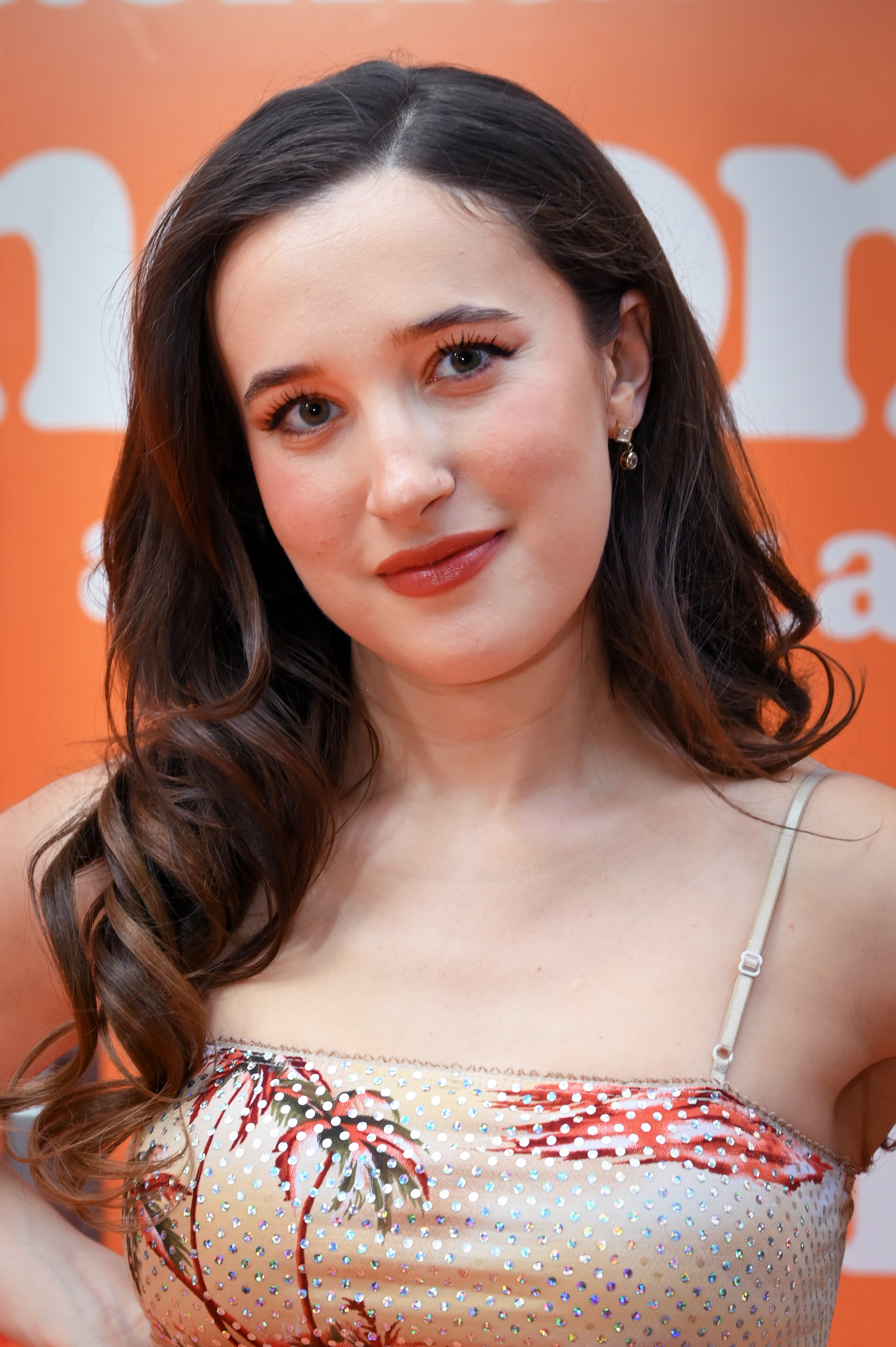
- Lawrence in 2026
- Born: March 16, 1997 (age 29); New York City, New York, US
- Education: Brown University (no degree)
- Occupations: Actress; singer
- Years active: 2009–present
- Father: Marc Lawrence
- Musical career
- Instrument: Vocals
- Years active: 2013–present
- Member of: Lawrence

Gracie Lawrence (born March 16, 1997) is an American actress and singer who co-fronts the soul-pop band Lawrence alongside her brother Clyde. For her performance as Connie Francis in Just in Time, Lawrence was nominated for the Tony Award for Best Featured Actress in a Musical and the Grammy Award for Best Musical Theater Album.

== Early life and education ==
Lawrence grew up in a Jewish family in New York City. Her father, Marc Lawrence, is a filmmaker, best known for writing Miss Congeniality. Lawrence and her brother Clyde have been performing music together since childhood. Their first venues were “small cafés and clubs around lower Manhattan.” She graduated from The Dalton School in 2015. She attended Brown University before dropping out to pursue music full-time.

== Career ==
=== Music ===
Lawrence and her brother Clyde put together a band and gave it their family name Lawrence. They released their first album, Breakfast in 2016. They have released four studio albums and several live and acoustic albums.

Lawrence currently has eight band members including Sam Askin, Sumner Becker, Jordan Cohen, Michael Karsh, Jonny Koh, and Marc Langer. In 2023, the band served as the opening act for the Jonas Brothers North American tour.

The band has performed on The Tonight Show Starring Jimmy Fallon and The Late Show with Stephen Colbert.

=== Acting ===
Lawrence made her Broadway debut in 2009 in the revival of the Neil Simon play Brighton Beach Memoirs.

She starred alongside Jonathan Groff as the singer Connie Francis in the musical Just in Time which premiered on April 23, 2025, at Broadway's Circle in the Square Theatre. She was nominated for the Tony Award for Best Featured Actress in a Musical for her performance. She also received a nomination for the Grammy Award for Best Musical Theater Album at the 68th Annual Grammy Awards.

She has had roles in The Americans, Younger, and Billions. In 2025, she joined the third season of Sex Lives of College Girls on Max as a series regular playing the character Kacey.

== Discography ==
All albums released under the name Lawrence, alongside her brother Clyde.

=== Studio albums ===
- Breakfast (2016)
- Living Room (2018)
- The Live Album (2020–21)
- Hotel TV (2021)
- Family Business (2024)
- Acoustic-ish (2025)

== Acting credits ==
=== Film ===
Year	Title	Role	Notes
2008	Phoebe in Wonderland	Julie	Credited as Gracie Bea Lawrence
2009	Did You Hear About the Morgans?	Lucy Granger	Credited as Gracie Bea Lawrence
2011	The Sitter	Wendy Sapperstein	Credited as Gracie Bea Lawrence
2019	Adam	Kelsey	
2019	Noelle	Elf Carol	
2021	Moxie	Lacey	

=== Television ===
Year	Title	Role	Notes
2012	The Good Wife	Portia	Credited as Gracie Bea Lawrence; Episode: "Here Comes the Judge"
2014	The Americans	Amelia Connors	Credited as Gracie Bea Lawrence; Episode: "Comrades"
2016	Younger	Michaela	Episode: "Tattoo You"
2018	One Dollar	Julie Gardner	Main role
2021–2022	Billions	Gail Prince	Recurring role
2024–2025	The Sex Lives of College Girls	Kacey Baker	Main role

=== Theater ===
Year	Title	Role	Venue	Notes
2009	Brighton Beach Memoirs	Laurie Morton	Nederlander Theatre	Broadway debut
2025	Just in Time	Connie Francis	Circle in the Square Theatre	
2025–2026	All Out: Comedy About Ambition	Performer	Nederlander Theatre	

== Awards and nominations ==
Association	Year	Category	Work	Result	Ref.
Tony Awards	2025	Best Performance by a Featured Actress in a Musical	Just in Time	Nominated	
Grammy Awards	2026	Best Musical Theater Album	Just in Time	Nominated	
Grammy Awards	2026	Best Arrangement, Instrumental and Vocals	"Something in the Water" (Acoustic-ish)	Nominated	
