= Miss Congeniality =

Miss Congeniality may refer to:

- Miss Congeniality (film), 2000 film, directed by Donald Petrie, starring Sandra Bullock and Benjamin Bratt
  - Miss Congeniality 2: Armed and Fabulous, a 2005 sequel
- A special award, the "Miss Congeniality Award", typically given at beauty pageants, specifically at:
  - Miss Universe
  - Miss World
  - Miss USA
  - Miss International Queen
  - Miss America
  - Miss Teen USA
  - RuPaul's Drag Race
- Amy Dumas, Miss Congeniality, professional wrestler
