= Music and Lyrics =

- Theatrical release poster
- Directed by: Marc Lawrence
- Written by: Marc Lawrence
- Produced by: Martin Shafer; Liz Glotzer
- Starring: Hugh Grant; Drew Barrymore; Brad Garrett; Kristen Johnston; Campbell Scott
- Cinematography: Xavier Pérez Grobet
- Edited by: Susan E. Morse
- Music by: Adam Schlesinger
- Production companies: Castle Rock Entertainment; Village Roadshow Pictures; Reserve Room
- Distributed by: Warner Bros. Pictures
- Release date: February 14, 2007 (United States)
- Running time: 104 minutes
- Country: United States
- Language: English
- Budget: $40 million
- Box office: $145.9 million

Music and Lyrics is a 2007 American musical romantic comedy-drama film written and directed by Marc Lawrence and stars Hugh Grant and Drew Barrymore.

The plot focuses on the relationship that evolves between former pop music idol Alex Fletcher and aspiring writer Sophie as they struggle to compose a song for a reigning pop diva.

The film was released on February 14, 2007, by Warner Bros. Pictures. It received mixed-to-positive reviews from critics, who praised Hugh Grant's performance and the musical numbers but found the film simplistic, and grossed $145.9 million worldwide.

== Plot ==
Alex Fletcher, once a member of British 80s supergroup PoP!, is now a washed-up pop star relegated to occasional performances at reunions and state fairs. Alex is asked by young megastar Cora Corman to write her a song to be titled "Way Back Into Love". He is reluctant, as his strength was composing music while former bandmate and former best friend Colin wrote the lyrics, but accepts at his manager Chris's urging in hopes of revitalizing his languishing career.

During an unsuccessful composing session with a pretentious lyricist, Alex discovers that Sophie, the young woman hired to water his plants, has a talent for writing lyrics. Desperate to meet his 48-hour deadline, Alex begs for her help; Sophie refuses at first but reconsiders when he composes a short tune setting her lyrics to his music.

Over the next few days, Alex and Sophie collaborate on the song and grow closer. Alex reveals that Colin stole several of their songs for his chart-topping solo album, propelling him to stardom while the rest of PoP! drifted into obscurity. Sophie in turn confides that she abandoned writing after a failed romance with her English professor Sloan Cates, and that she was the basis for the vapid main character in his best-selling novel.

Alex and Sophie deliver the finished song to Cora, narrowly beating the deadline, and are thrilled when she accepts it. Later, at a celebratory dinner, Sophie is mortified to encounter Sloan. She confronts him but finds herself tongue-tied in his presence, and Alex's attempts to defend her result in a physical altercation. They retreat to Alex's apartment to nurse their wounds, where they give into their growing attraction, spending the night together.

Cora invites Alex and Sophie to the studio for a sneak preview of their song, but they are appalled by her risqué, Bollywood-style interpretation. In private, Sophie complains that Cora's version clashes with the original song's quiet, vulnerable tone; Alex agrees but dismisses it as the cost of doing business. Later, over Alex's objections, Sophie shares her concerns with Cora, who appreciates her honesty but refuses to make changes.

Tasked by Cora with writing an additional verse by the next morning, tensions rise between Alex and Sophie, leading to a heated argument. She accuses him of selling out, and he offends her by declaring that Sloan's assessment of her character was accurate. The next morning, Alex meets with Cora and is dismayed to learn that Sophie has faxed over an additional verse based on their argument, effectively ending their partnership.

Sophie, preparing to start a new life in Florida, reluctantly attends Cora's opening performance at Madison Square Garden. Midway through the show, Cora announces the debut of a new song "written by Alex Fletcher". Believing Alex has stolen credit for their work, a heartbroken Sophie tries to leave.

Instead, to her surprise, Alex performs a heartfelt ballad written entirely on his own, a plea for Sophie to give him another chance. Moved, she finds him backstage, where he reveals that Cora agreed to drop the risqué arrangement of their song to help him win her back. The two reconcile and share a kiss, and Alex and Cora perform “Way Back Into Love” as it was intended to be sung.

The film's ending (an homage to VH1's Pop-Up Video) reveals that “Way Back Into Love” became a smash hit for Cora and Alex; the film adaptation of Sloan's novel was a critical and financial flop, destroying his career; PoP! was inducted into the Rock and Roll Hall of Fame, and during their performance Colin suffered an injury that required hip replacement surgery; and Alex and Sophie continued their successful partnership in both love and songwriting, collaborating on Alex's new solo album, which contains five new hit singles.

== Cast ==
- Hugh Grant as Alex Fletcher, a New York-based former pop music idol and member of the British band "PoP!" (inspired by Wham! and Duran Duran)
- Drew Barrymore as Sophie Fisher
- Brad Garrett as Chris Riley, Alex's manager
- Kristen Johnston as Rhonda Fisher, Sophie's sister
- Haley Bennett as Cora Corman, a rising pop diva who commissions Alex Fletcher to write a song for her.
- Aasif Mandvi as Khan, the manager of Alex's apartment
- Campbell Scott as Sloan Cates
- Jason Antoon as Greg Antonsky
- Matthew Morrison as Ray, Cora's manager
- Scott Porter as Colin Thompson
- Zak Orth as David Newbert
- Adam Grupper as Gary, Sophie's brother-in-law

== Reception ==
=== Critical response ===
On Rotten Tomatoes, the film holds an approval rating of 63% based on 169 reviews, with an average rating of 6/10. The site's critical consensus reads, "Music & Lyrics is a light and pleasant romantic comedy that succeeds because of the considerable charm of its co-stars. The music segments featuring Hugh Grant are worth the price of admission." On Metacritic the film has a weighted average score of 59 out of 100, based on 30 critics, indicating "mixed or average reviews". Audiences polled by CinemaScore gave the film an average grade of "B" on an A+ to F scale.

A.O. Scott of The New York Times called the film "the type of modern Hollywood production that aspires to nothing more than the competent dispensing of mild amusement and easy emotion. The writer and director, Marc Lawrence ... shows some imagination as he parodies the music-video styles of various eras, and he contrives a bit of novelty in making the movie's central couple creative partners as well as potential lovers ... Mr. Grant is at his best when he allows a hard glint of caddish narcissism to peek through his easy flirtatiousness, something he did in About a Boy and American Dreamz. There is not quite enough of that here, nor enough of the anarchic loopiness that Ms. Barrymore brought to roles opposite Adam Sandler in The Wedding Singer and 50 First Dates."

Mick LaSalle of the San Francisco Chronicle observed, "Writer-director Marc Lawrence makes a talk-heavy variety of romantic comedy that not everyone likes - Miss Congeniality, Two Weeks Notice, Forces of Nature - but he does it well. Moreover, Music and Lyrics has virtues its predecessors lack. Scenes play out longer than in most films, and conversations have a chance to evolve. Also, because much of the film places the protagonists in rooms together, working for extended periods, there are an unusual number of two-person scenes, giving the actors the chance to show their charm, work off each other and develop the nuances of interaction ... Lawrence's take on pop music success is exactly right, satiric without being absurdist, and therefore a prize worth the effort."

Todd McCarthy of Variety said "Sitcommy in structure and execution, this very mainstream romance ... offers few surprises. But its pep, agreeable performances and appealing central conceit will profitably put this Warner Bros. Valentine's Day romantic comedy over with women and couples seeking a nice diversion ... Writer-director Marc Lawrence ... makes everything about three times more obvious than it needs to be; as a director, he needs to edit himself better as a writer ... But there's energy here, and the actors feed on it."

Peter Bradshaw of The Guardian rated the film two out of five stars, calling it a "very moderate romcom" and adding, "Grant and Barrymore make a reasonable odd couple, and both have charm, but this never comes to life."

Philip French of The Observer said, "Grant has the occasional good line (or at least he makes a few of them seem funny), but the film limps along like someone trying to tap dance in flippers."

=== Box office ===
The film opened on February 9, 2007, in the United Kingdom and Ireland and ranked #1 at the box office, grossing £1.93 million in its first weekend. It was released on 2,955 screens in the United States and Canada on February 14 and grossed $13,623,630 on its opening weekend, ranking #4 at the box office behind Ghost Rider, Bridge to Terabithia, and Norbit. It eventually grossed $50,572,589 in the US and Canada and $95,323,833 in foreign markets for a total worldwide box office of $145,896,422.

== Soundtrack ==
Music and Lyrics soundtrack

Music and Lyrics: Music from the Motion Picture is the 2007 soundtrack from the film. It was released by Atlantic Records on February 13, 2007, and features songs performed by the film's stars Hugh Grant, Drew Barrymore, and Haley Bennett. The album reached #5 on the Billboard Top Soundtracks Chart and #63 on the Billboard 200.

The song "Invincible" performed by Haley Bennett that plays at the end of the film credits does not appear on the soundtrack. The same is true for the song "Work to Do", written by Adam Schlesinger (who wrote most of the songs for the film) and performed by the folk band America, which plays only at the end of the film credits.

Martin Fry of pop band ABC served as Grant's vocal coach for the movie. The album also reached #93 on the Australian Albums Chart.

=== Track listing ===
#	Title	Songwriters	Credit on CD insert	Credited in film	Track Length
1	"PoP! Goes My Heart"	Andrew Wyatt (credited in film as A. Blakemore), Alanna Vicente	All instruments: Andrew Wyatt, Vocals: Hugh Grant, Andrew Wyatt	Hugh Grant	3:16
2	"Buddha's Delight (studio)"	Credited in film: Christian Karlsson, Pontus Winnberg, Henrik Jonback, A. Blakemore, and Marc Lawrence [Adam Schlesinger, Rachel Perry (demo version)] (CD credit?)	Vocals: Haley Bennett, B-vox: Lucy Woodward	Haley Bennett	2:47
3	"Meaningless Kiss"	Adam Schlesinger	Sax: Jack Bashkow, B-vox: Martin Fry	Hugh Grant	3:49
4	"Entering Bootytown"	Andrew Wyatt (credited in film as A. Blakemore)	All instruments: Andrew Wyatt, Vocals: Haley Bennett	Haley Bennett	3.24
5	"Way Back into Love (Demo Mix)"	Adam Schlesinger	All instruments: Adam Schlesinger, Vocals: Drew Barrymore, Hugh Grant	Drew Barrymore, Hugh Grant	4:12
6	"Tony the Beat"	Jesper Anderberg, Johan Bengtsson, Maja Ivarsson, Frederik Nilsson, and Felix Rodriguez	The Sounds	The Sounds	3:10
7	"Dance With Me Tonight"	Clyde Lawrence	Intro: Clyde Lawrence, Vocals: Hugh Grant, Andrew Wyatt, Sax: Sam Albright	Hugh Grant	3:00
8	"Slam"	Andrew Wyatt (credited in film as A. Blakemore) and Marc Lawrence	Vocals: Haley Bennett, B-vox: Andrew Wyatt	Haley Bennett	3:48
9	"Don't Write Me Off"	Adam Schlesinger	Piano: Adam Schlesinger, Vocals: Hugh Grant	Hugh Grant	2:30
10	"Way Back into Love (unlive)"	Adam Schlesinger	All instruments: Adam Schlesinger, Vocals: Hugh Grant, Haley Bennett, B-vox: Britta Phillips, Kelly Jones	Haley Bennett, Hugh Grant	4:37
11	"Different Sound"	Teddybears	Vocals: Malte Holmberg (Sweden)	Teddybears	3:23
12	"Love Autopsy (studio)"	Marc Lawrence	Piano: Michael Rafter, Vocals: Hugh Grant	Hugh Grant	0:40

=== Charts ===
Chart (2007)	Provider	Peak position
Austrian Albums Chart	Media Control	21
French Albums Chart	SNEP/IFOP	118
German Albums Chart	Media Control	26
Swiss Albums Chart	Media Control	21
U.S. Billboard 200	Billboard	63

== Home media ==
The film was released on DVD on May 8, 2007, and on Blu-ray on June 12, 2007.
