= The Rewrite =

- British release poster
- Directed by: Marc Lawrence
- Written by: Marc Lawrence
- Produced by: Liz Glotzer; Martin Shafer
- Starring: Hugh Grant; Marisa Tomei; Bella Heathcote; J. K. Simmons; Chris Elliott; Allison Janney
- Cinematography: Jonathan Brown
- Edited by: Ken Eluto
- Music by: Clyde Lawrence
- Production companies: Castle Rock Entertainment; Reserve Room
- Distributed by: RLJ Entertainment
- Release dates: June 15, 2014 (Shanghai Int'l Film Festival); February 13, 2015 (United States)
- Running time: 106 minutes
- Country: United States
- Language: English
- Box office: $4.5 million

The Rewrite is a 2014 American romantic comedy-drama film written and directed by Marc Lawrence. It stars Hugh Grant as a washed-up screenwriter who begins teaching at Binghamton University, and Marisa Tomei as a single mother with whom the screenwriter finds romance. It began development at Castle Rock Entertainment in October 2012, and filming began in New York in April 2013.

The Rewrite premiered at the Shanghai International Film Festival on June 15, 2014, and was released in the United States on February 13, 2015. The film received mixed reviews from critics.

== Plot ==
Keith Michaels is a divorced and depressed screenwriter whose only successful work was Paradise Misplaced, which won the Academy Award for Best Original Screenplay fifteen years ago. Unemployed and low on funds after a long period of unsuccessful pitching, he reluctantly takes up a job teaching screenwriting at Binghamton University in Upstate New York.

On arrival, Keith angers fellow professor Mary Weldon with derogatory comments about Jane Austen and other misogynistic behavior. He also strikes up an unethical relationship with young undergraduate student Karen Gabney, which ends quickly. Keith also does not believe in the concept of teaching and is scornful of his job, as exemplified by his selecting mostly women students for his class based solely on their appearance and then dismissing the class for a month.

After being publicly challenged by an outraged Karen about his competence, Keith starts to devote more time and effort to coaching his students. He helps them discover their passion and improve their writing. Keith finds great potential in Clem Ronson, a shy and awkward nerd, whose script quickly garners the interest of his agent, Ellen.

Keith also forms a friendship with mature student Holly Carpenter, a single mother of two who is in a steady but unloving relationship. They often disagree on their perspectives on life, where Keith believes that nothing will salvage his failing career or mend his relationship with his estranged son Alex, whereas Holly maintains an optimistic outlook on life and believes that with effort, talents can be developed and problems can be solved. Despite their differences, Keith finds enlightenment in Holly’s advice and makes the first move in contacting Alex.

However, Keith’s problems worsen when his outline for Paradise Misplaced II gets rejected and he faces expulsion from the school after his short-lived relationship with Karen is exposed. In frustration, Keith gets into an argument with Holly, so decides to leave the school. As a last parting gesture, he accompanies Clem to Manhattan to meet with Hollywood film producers.

Halfway through the meeting, Keith has an epiphany about how he has helped his students. So, leaving a newly confident Clem to resume the meeting by himself, he heads back to Binghamton to save his job. Keith manages to do so with a sincere apology to Professor Weldon.

In a revelation of his renewed priorities, Keith expresses admiration for Holly’s determination in life and they show a mutual interest in each other. He also declines Ellen's invitation to return to Hollywood, as he has decided to stay in Binghamton to teach and write a screenplay based on his experience there. Keith also tells Ellen not to call during class hours.

Keith is welcomed back warmly by his students and apologizes to them for the confusing almost leaving, and then coming back. The film ends with Keith's phone flashing with a voicemail from Alex.

== Cast ==
- Hugh Grant as Keith Michaels
- Marisa Tomei as Holly Carpenter
- Bella Heathcote as Karen Gabney
- Allison Janney as Prof. Mary Weldon
- J. K. Simmons as Dr. Hal Lerner
- Chris Elliott as Jim Harper
- Aja Naomi King as Rosa Tejeda
- Karen Pittman as Naomi Watkins
- Steven Kaplan as Clem Ronson
- Annie Qian as Sara Liu
- Caroline Aaron as Ellen
- Olivia Luccardi as Chloe
- Jason Antoon as Greg Nathan
- Damaris Lewis as Maya
- Andrew Keenan-Bolger as Billy Frazier
- Emily Morden as Andrea Stein-Rosen

== Production ==
The Rewrite is written and directed by Marc Lawrence, with development becoming at Castle Rock Entertainment. In October 2012, Hugh Grant was cast in the film's starring role, marking the fourth collaboration between Lawrence and Grant: Two Weeks Notice, Music and Lyrics, and Did You Hear About the Morgans?. Grant said, "I love Marc's stuff, and [The Rewrite] made me laugh. [I wasn't interested] in the sort of marketed, Hallmark, 'Valentine's Day' sense — I find that repugnant. Here, the romantic comedy part of it is only a small part; it's about this broken guy who mends himself."

In November 2012, Marisa Tomei entered negotiations to star opposite Grant. In the following March, Bella Heathcote joined the cast. Variety reported, "This film would give Heathcote some lighter material after breaking out in serious projects," referring to In Time and Not Fade Away. Later in the month, Allison Janney, J. K. Simmons, and Chris Elliott joined the cast.

Filming began in New York in April 2013. Several scenes were shot at Binghamton University on August 3, 2013.

== Release ==
FilmNation Entertainment handled sales of The Rewrite's distribution in territories outside the United States. The film premiered at a gala screening at the Shanghai International Film Festival on June 15, 2014. Distributor Lionsgate scheduled the film to be released in theaters in the United Kingdom on October 8, 2014. The University of Binghamton held screenings of the film on February 7 and 8, 2015.

=== Critical response ===
On review aggregation website Rotten Tomatoes, the film has an approval rating of 66% based on 62 reviews, with an average rating of 6/10. The site's critical consensus reads, "The Rewrite's unremarkable plot is enlivened considerably by its likable cast, adding up to a comedy that coasts capably on the charms of Hugh Grant and his co-stars." On Metacritic, which assigns a weighted average rating, the film has a score 51 out of 100, based on 17 critics, indicating "mixed or average reviews".

The Hollywood Reporter's Elizabeth Kerr said The Rewrite was not groundbreaking as a romantic comedy but that "it is a pleasant diversion for fans of the form". Kerr considered the film an improvement from Did You Hear About the Morgans? (2009) and said while it was initially similar to Liberal Arts (2012) with "its aggressive academic and literary tone", it fell back on romantic comedy conventions. She found that Grant "embraces his maturity" as an older version of his typical character but that Tomei's character was "painfully underwritten". Kerr said the supporting characters would have been forgettable if the actors were not so strong.
