= Lawrence (band) =

American pop band

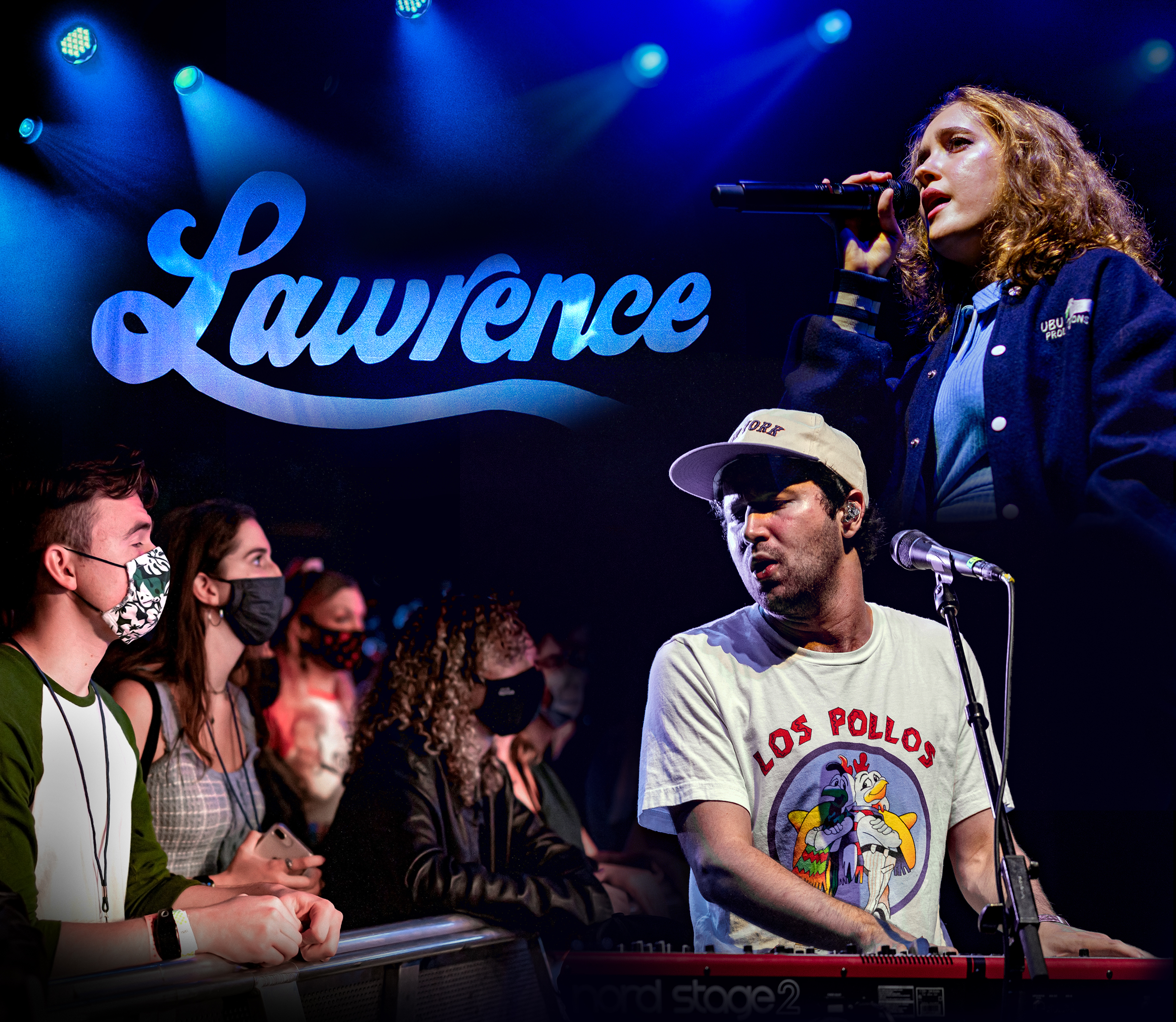

Background information
- Also known as: The Clyde Lawrence Band
- Origin: New York City, New York, US
- Genres: Pop-soul; funk; R&B
- Years active: 2013–present
- Label: Beautiful Mind
- Spinoffs: The Diner; Still Grounded
- Members: Clyde Lawrence; Gracie Lawrence; Sam Askin; Sumner Becker; Jordan Cohen; Michael Karsh; Jonny Koh; Marc Langer
- Past members: Justin Ryan Adelman
- Website: lawrencetheband.com

Lawrence is an American pop-soul band formed in New York City by siblings Clyde Lawrence and Gracie Lawrence. Their fourth studio album, Family Business, was released on June 21, 2024. The lead track, “Whatcha Want,” broke into the Top 40 on the U.S. Pop Chart, was featured in The New York Times as a Song Of The Summer (Readers Pick), and was performed live on The Tonight Show Starring Jimmy Fallon. “Something In The Water,” another track from the album, earned a 2026 Grammy Award nomination for Best Arrangement, Instruments & Vocals for Clyde, Gracie, and their brother Linus.

== Band formation ==
Clyde and Gracie Lawrence are siblings (three and a half years apart in age); they have been creating music and performing together since their childhood in New York City. The pair have since been joined by six of their best friends from various points in their childhood to form an eight-piece group featuring dual lead vocals, a horn section, and a full rhythm section. Their father, Marc Lawrence, is a filmmaker, screenwriter, and director best known for the films Miss Congeniality and Music and Lyrics. Their younger brother Linus was featured on the song "Come On, Brother" from their album Breakfast. He has also appeared in their music videos.

Clyde began studying piano at an early age and began writing songs during childhood. In the band, he predominantly plays keyboard and sings, but he also occasionally plays bass, guitar, and other instruments. He graduated from the Dalton School in New York City in 2011 and completed an undergraduate degree at Brown University in 2015.

Gracie also attended the Dalton School, graduating in 2015. She attended Brown after taking a gap year to tour with the band. Gracie was set to graduate from Brown in 2020 but left college early to play with Lawrence full time.

When Marc Lawrence was working on the 2000 film Miss Congeniality and was not pleased with his options for the Miss United States pageant theme song, he turned to Clyde. At only age five, Clyde wrote his own version, and the film's other producers chose to add it to the film without knowing its writer. The Miss United States pageant anthem which Clyde composed is prominently featured in the film, and his composition led him to become the youngest member of the Songwriters Guild of America.

While studying at Brown University, Clyde started a band originally called The Clyde Lawrence Band for which he sang lead vocals and played keyboard. The band featured a rotating crew of Brown students as members, including all of the current Lawrence members. Gracie, still in high school, also traveled to perform with the band. The Clyde Lawrence Band played events on campus as well as at colleges and venues across the Northeast, building a strong following of college students through word of mouth. Various members of the Clyde Lawrence Band performed on Clyde's 2013 debut EP, Homesick. In 2015, during Clyde’s senior year of college and Gracie’s senior year of high school, the band's name was officially changed to Lawrence.

Seven of the eight members of Lawrence attended Brown University.

== Career ==
Breakfast And Living Room

Lawrence released its first full-length album Breakfast in 2016, which reached No. 6 on the iTunes R&B charts on its first day of release. Produced by Grammy winner Eric Krasno, Breakfast includes musical appearances from members of Snarky Puppy and Lettuce. The single “Do You Wanna Do Nothing With Me?” received increased online attention and helped introduce the band to a wider audience. Following the release of Breakfast, Lawrence embarked on multiple headlining tours across the United States, performing in increasingly larger venues.

Their second album, Living Room, was released in September 2018, followed by their late-night television debut on NBC's Last Call with Carson Daly. The album, which combines elements of Lawrence's old and new influences while featuring themes of childhood and family issues, was co-produced by bandmates Jordan Cohen (tenor/baritone saxophone) and Jonny Koh (guitar), Brooklyn-based producer Eli Crews, as well as Clyde and Gracie themselves.

Jon Bellion Collaboration and Hotel TV

In February 2019, Lawrence announced that the band would be an opener for Jon Bellion on his summer 2019 national tour, the Glory Sound Prep Tour. In June, Lawrence released its first of many Bellion-produced singles, "Casualty". In July, Bellion and Lawrence announced that Bellion had launched his own record label, Beautiful Mind Records and had signed Lawrence as its first artist. Bellion has said that his intention with the new label is to "take care of artists for the rest of their careers" and to create a family of musical creators who he supports and with whom he collaborates.

In July 2021, Lawrence released their album Hotel TV on Beautiful Mind Records. Jon Bellion co-produced and co-wrote the songs on the album along with Clyde, Gracie and their bandmates Jordan Cohen and Jonny Koh. The album's lead single, "Don't Lose Sight," was featured in a Microsoft commercial. The band performed "Don't Lose Sight" on Jimmy Kimmel Live!, did a performance of it for The Late Show with Stephen Colbert, and closed both of their sets at Coachella with it. The album’s release was supported by Lawrence’s largest headline tour yet in 2021, their first tour after COVID-19.

Family Business

Lawrence released its fourth studio album, Family Business, in 2024. The album was once again co-produced with Jon Bellion and explored themes of family, independence, and life as working musicians. In support of the album, the band embarked on its largest headlining tour to date, including a sold-out performance at Radio City Music Hall in New York City.

In the lead-up to the album, Lawrence not only released several singles from Family Business, but also was featured on Jacob Collier's single "Wherever I Go~~,~~" Meghan Trainor's single “Crushin’” from her album Timeless.

The lead single from Family Business, "Whatcha Want," broke into the Top 40 on the U.S. Pop Chart, leading to performances on the Tonight Show Starring Jimmy Fallon, The Kelly Clarkson Show, Today With Hoda & Jenna, and CBS Saturday Morning.

During this period, Lawrence’s profile continued to rise through high-profile performances, festival appearances, and collaborations. The band was recognized for its independent approach to building a career while maintaining creative control.

In December 2025, Lawrence began a 12-week run on Broadway in the show All Out: Comedy About Ambition by Simon Rich, directed by Alex Timbers. The show combines Lawrence's songs about work and business (mostly from Family Business) with Rich's comedy stories on the same topic, and features a rotating cast of comedians including Sarah Silverman, Jon Stewart, Jim Gaffigan, and others.

Clyde Lawrence, Gracie Lawrence, and their brother Linus Lawrence received a 2026 Grammy nomination for Best Arrangement, Instrument And Vocals for the Lawrence song "Something In The Water (Acoustic-ish)".

The album release was accompanied with the announcement of the Family Business Tour with shows in Europe and North America in 2024. The tour spanned 18 months, 12 different countries, and 94 different cities across North America, Europe, and Australia.

The band has toured extensively, including several international headline tours, opening slots for acts such as The Rolling Stones, Jonas Brothers, Jon Bellion, Lake Street Dive, Vulfpeck, Jacob Collier, and others, and music festivals~~,~~ appearances including Coachella and Outside Lands.

== Musical Style and Identity ==
Lawrence’s music has been described as a fusion of soul, R&B, funk, and pop. The band is noted for its use of live instrumentation, particularly its horn section, which plays a central role in its arrangements. Critics have highlighted the interplay between Clyde and Gracie Lawrence’s vocals as a defining characteristic of the group’s sound.

Lawrence developed a following through the “acoustic-ish” video series, in which they create live video reimaginings of their songs featuring expanded arrangements and guest musicians.

Following the COVID-19 pandemic, the band embarked on the Hotel TV Tour, a 53-city tour across North America, which was the subject of a 12-part documentary series released on the band’s YouTube channel. After the tour the band co-headlined a tour with MisterWives. The group has toured with acts such as Lake Street Dive, Vulfpeck, Jon Bellion, Jacob Collier, Soulive, O.A.R., and Bernhoft and has appeared at festivals including Coachella, Bonnaroo, Outside Lands, Firefly, Okeechobee, Hangout, and Summerfest. Their 2022 Coachella set earned them a spot on the "Five Top Moments from Coachella" in Variety magazine. In 2023, the band joined the Jonas Brothers on the entire North America leg of their “Five Albums. One Night. The World Tour.”

In November 2022, Lawrence threw their own 3-night festival at Brooklyn Steel entitled Staycation. Each night had its own theme (including wedding night, Y2K night, and New York night), and featured two opening acts followed by a two-hour set from Lawrence. Each night also had its own unique set design, setlist, and costumes that corresponded with the theme. Across the three sold-out nights (6,000 tickets sold), Lawrence performed more than 70 different songs with minimal repetition.

In January 2024, Lawrence announced a headline tour to support their album Family Business. The tour ultimately spanned 18 months, 12 different countries, and 94 different cities across North America, Europe, and Australia, including sold-out shows at Radio City Music Hall in New York City, The Wiltern in Los Angeles, The Forum in London, and the North Sea Jazz Festival in Rotterdam.

In 2026, Lawrence announced Staycation: Coast-to-Coast – a second installment of their Staycation festival, following up the initial sold-out 2022 inaugural event. The band played three nights at the Brooklyn Paramount in New York City, to be followed by three nights in Los Angeles at The NOVO.

== Other projects ==
Gracie Lawrence Acting Career

Gracie is a singer and actress. She made her Broadway debut in 2009 in the revival of the Neil Simon play Brighton Beach Memoirs.

She starred alongside Jonathan Groff as the singer Connie Francis in the musical Just in Time which premiered on April 23, 2025, at Broadway's Circle in the Square Theatre. She was nominated for the Tony Award for Best Featured Actress in a Musical for her performance. She also received a nomination for the Grammy Award for Best Musical Theater Album at the 68th Annual Grammy Awards.

She has had roles in The Good Wife, The Americans, Younger, and Billions. In 2025, she joined the third season of Sex Lives of College Girls on Max as a series regular playing the character Kacey. In 2018, she played Julie Gardner on the main cast of the series One Dollar. She was featured in Town & Country magazine's "Modern Swans" September 2018 issue.

The Diner

Clyde Lawrence, Jordan Cohen, and Jonny Koh formed production trio The Diner. They have worked on projects with Jonas Brothers, Tori Kelly, Jon Bellion, Alec Benjamin, Shawn Mendes and others. The Diner co-writes & produces all of Lawrence's music.

Clyde’s Composing & Film Scoring Work

From an early age, Clyde contributed music to his father Marc Lawrence’s films, including the “Miss United States” theme song for Miss Congeniality (2000), an original song (“Dance With Me Tonight”) and additional score for Music & Lyrics (2007), an original song (“New York Is Where I Live”) and additional score for Did You Hear About The Morgans? (2009), and the full original score for The Rewrite(2014) and Disney’s Noelle (2019), which featured not only original score from Clyde Lawrence and Cody Fitzgerald but also a variety of original Lawrence songs and Lawrence holiday covers.

More recently, Clyde has contributed songs and score to a variety of other film and TV projects, often in collaboration with composer Cody Fitzgerald or bandmate Jordan Cohen. In 2017, Lawrence and Cohen collaborated with Chris Bordeaux to compose the full original score for the comedy film Landline starring Jenny Slate. In 2020, they contributed several original songs and score pieces to the reboot of Animaniacs for Hulu (produced by Steven Spielberg). They have additionally contributed music for The Jinx: Part Two (2024), Unbreakable Kimmy Schmidt: Kimmy vs the Reverend (2020), and CBS police procedural Instinct (2018), among others.

In 2025, Lawrence and Fitzgerald composed the full soundtrack for Cooper Raiff’s comedy drama television series Hal & Harper (2025) starring Raiff, Lili Reinhart, Betty Gilpin, and Mark Ruffalo, which premiered at the Sundance Film Festival and was subsequently released on the streaming platform MUBI. The project marked their most prominent series scoring credit to date and received positive attention for its eclectic, character-driven musical approach. The official soundtrack with Lawrence and Fitzgerald’s compositions was released in December 2025.

In 2026, Lawrence and Fitzgerald composed the score for upcoming coming-of-age comedy Brian.

Advocacy for musicians’ rights

Several members of Lawrence, particularly Clyde Lawrence and Jordan Cohen, have been outspoken about issues that they and other artists face in navigating the live music industry. They have discussed it in various press interviews, fan q+a sessions, and in their tour docuseries on YouTube.

In December 2022, Clyde Lawrence authored a guest essay in The New York Times discussing the financial realities faced by touring musicians in the modern music industry. Following the publication of the essay, Clyde Lawrence was invited to testify before the United States Senate Judiciary Committee at a 2023 hearing examining competition and transparency in the live entertainment and ticketing industries. Appearing as a witness on behalf of working musicians, Lawrence delivered testimony describing the economic pressures faced by touring artists, including rising venue costs, ticketing fees, and the challenges of operating independently within a concentrated marketplace.

In 2024, Live Nation Entertainment announced a new initiative titled the “On the Road Again” program, which the company described as an effort to reduce certain fees and costs for developing and mid-level touring acts. The program included measures such as reduced merchandise commissions at select venues and financial incentives aimed at lowering barriers for emerging artists. Multiple news reports referenced Lawrence’s op-ed and Senate testimony as influential in bringing attention to the issues the program sought to address. While the initiative was welcomed by some artists and industry observers, others characterized it as an incremental step within a larger, ongoing debate about structural reform in the concert business.

Side project: Hi-Lo Jack

Hi-Lo Jack is a musical project consisting of Clyde Lawrence, Cody Fitzgerald (founder of the indie-rock band Stolen Jars and a frequent collaborator with Clyde on composing work for film and TV projects), and Dolapo Akinkugbe, a hip-hop artist who releases music under the name DAP The Contract.

In 2017, they released an EP called “Old New Clothes" with 6 songs.

In 2026, they released their debut album “Group Project” May 1st, which consisted of songs from the "Old New Clothes", and songs they composed recently. It has 13 songs total, with 7 newly composed songs and the 6 songs from "Old New Clothes" EP.

== Band members ==
- Gracie Lawrence – lead vocals, tambourine
- Clyde Lawrence – lead vocals, keyboards
- Sam Askin – drums
- Sumner Becker – alto saxophone
- Jordan Cohen – tenor saxophone, baritone saxophone, background vocals
- Michael Karsh – bass, background vocals
- Jonny Koh – guitar, background vocals
- Marc Langer – trumpet, rapping

== Discography ==
=== Studio albums ===
- Breakfast (2016)
- Living Room (2018)
- Hotel TV (2021)
- Family Business (2024)

=== Live albums ===
- Breakfast: Unscrambled (Acoustic Sessions) (2018)
- The Live Album (Part 1) (2020)
- The Live Album (Part 2) (2021)
- Acoustic-ish: An album...ish (2025)

=== Extended plays ===
- Homesick (2013) (as The Clyde Lawrence Band)

=== Live EPs ===
- Lawrence on Audiotree Live (2016)
- Jam in the Van - Lawrence (Live Session, Los Angeles, CA, 2021) (2021)

=== Singles ===
- "Do You Wanna Do Nothing With Me?" (2017)
- "Misty Morning" (2017)
- "Probably Up" (2018)
- "Make A Move" (2018)
- "Casualty" (2019)
- "Casualty" (Acoustic) (2019)
- "It's Not All About You" (2019)
- "The Weather" (2020)
- "The Weather" (Acoustic & Gospel Reprise) (2020)
- "Quarantined With You" (2020)
- "Freckles (Live in LA)" (2020)
- "Freckles" (2020)
- "Don't Lose Sight" (2021)
- "False Alarms" (with Jon Bellion) (2021)
- "I'm Confident That I'm Insecure" (2023)
- "I'm Confident That I'm Insecure" (Acoustic-ish) (2023)
- "23" (2023)
- "23" (Acoustic-ish) (2023)
- "Guy I Used To Be" (2024)
- "Family Business" (2024)
- "Whatcha Want" (Acoustic-ish) (2024)

== Awards and nominations ==
Year	Award	Category	Nominated work	Result	Ref.
2026	Grammy Awards	Best Arrangement, Instrumental and Vocals	"Something in the Water" (Acoustic-ish)	Nominated	
