= Jason Antoon =

American actor (born 1971)

- Born: Jason Allan Antoon; November 9, 1971 (age 55); Santa Monica, California, U.S.
- Education: Carnegie Mellon University (BFA in drama)
- Occupation: Actor
- Years active: 1996–present
- Spouse: Seana Kofoed (m. 2010)
- Children: 2

Jason Allan Antoon (born November 9, 1971) is an American actor.

== Personal life ==
Antoon was born in Santa Monica, California. He is of Lebanese descent. Antoon has been married to actress Seana Kofoed since 2010; they have two children.

== Career ==
=== Stage ===
Antoon is best known for his role in the 2000 Tony Award-winning musical Contact. For his performance, he received a Drama Desk Award nomination for Outstanding Supporting Actor in a Musical.

=== Film and television ===
Among his television work, Antoon starred on the short-lived TV series Kings, in addition to numerous guest roles on various programs such as Modern Family in the episode Game Changer. On the big screen, he had a featured role in Minority Report, cast when Steven Spielberg discovered him in Contact. In 2008, he had a cameo in Taking Woodstock and he was seen in two 2010 George Gallo films, Columbus Circle and Middle Men. Antoon voiced the role of Garrison "Knobs" Butler in the web series Electric City, and portrayed 35-year-old struggling actor Alowisus Hewson who is a vampire in the web series Vamped Out. He has a supporting role on the TNT drama Claws, playing Dr. Ken Brickman. From 2021 to 2024 he appeared as regular character Ernie Malik on NCIS: Hawai'i.

== Filmography ==
=== Film ===
Year	Title	Role
2000	Company Man	Croupier (uncredited)
2002	The Sum of All Fears	AFRAT Specialist Stubbs
2002	Minority Report	Rufus T. Riley
2002	Two Weeks Notice	Norman
2004	Little Black Book	Larry
2005	The Producers	Jason Green
2007	Music and Lyrics	Greg Antonski
2007	Perfect Stranger	Bill Patel
2007	The Ten	Salazar 'Fred' McBairn
2009	Middle Men	Denny Z
2012	Celeste and Jesse Forever	Young Man
2014	The Rewrite	Greg Nathan
2016	The Late Bloomer	Kenny
2019	Noelle	Omar

=== Television ===
Year	Title	Role	Notes
1996	New York Undercover	Victor Stromfeld	Episode "Going Platinum"
1996, 1999	Spin City	Abdul / Cab Driver	2 episodes
1997	Path to Paradise: The Untold Story of the World Trade Center Bombing	Nosair's Phone Pal	TV movie
1997	The Sports Illustrated for Kids Show	That Guy	TV special
1997, 2006	Law & Order	Attorney Hogenbaum	2 episodes
2001	100 Centre Street		Episode "Domestic Abuses"
2001	Count Me In	Luther	TV movie
2001	Ed	Deejay	Episode "Prom Night"
2001	Sex and the City	Framer	Episode "The Real Me"
2002	Live from Baghdad	Mr. Mazin	TV movie
2002	Hack	Henry Nibs	Episode "My Alibi"
2003	George Lopez	Hosni	Episode "Profiles in Courage"
2004	Law & Order: Special Victims Unit	Radio Producer	Episode "Obscene"
2005	Jake in Progress	Seedy Guy	2 episodes
2005	Law & Order: Criminal Intent	Mr. Smythe	Episode "No Exit"
2006	The Lost Room	The Sood	Episode: "The Eye and the Prime Object"
2008	Lipstick Jungle	David Hernandez	Chapter Five: "Dressed to Kill"
2008	Cashmere Mafia	Todd Braun / Todd McDonnell	2 episodes
2009	The Electric Company	Calvero	2 episodes
2009	Kings	Boyden	11 episodes
2009	Numb3rs	Kai Kragen	Episode: "7 Men Out"
2010	Modern Family	Apple Customer	Episode: "Game Changer"
2010	Mad	Lex Luthor / The Spatula Announcer / MAD's Guide to Phobias Announcer (voice)	Episode: "WALL·E·NATOR / Extreme Renovation: House Edition"
2010, 2011	No Ordinary Family	Mr. Litchfield	9 episodes
2011	The Big C	Funeral Director	Episode: "A Little Death"
2012	Electric City	Garrison "Knobs" Butler (voice)	20 episodes
2012	New Girl	Clipboard Guy	Episode: "Models"
2013	Grey's Anatomy	Mr. Samuels	Episode: "I Bet It Stung"
2013	Castle	Steve Warner	Episode: "A Murder Is Forever"
2014	Newsreaders	Corey Firfe	Episode: "The Journey of an iPhone; Restaurant Plague"
2015	Weird Loners	CooKoo Schmoolie	Episode: "Weirded Out"
2015	Con Man	Crazy Bruno	Episode: "Too Much Closure for Comfort"
2015	iZombie	Smoak	Episode: "Abra Cadaver"
2016	Childrens Hospital	Imam Islam	Episode: "Show Me a Hero"
2016	Shameless	Dr. Ruben	Episode: "Hiraeth"
2017–22	Claws	Dr. Ken Brickman	Main role
2017	Fresh Off the Boat	Howie	Episode: "Living While Eddie"
2017	Famous in Love	Wyatt	6 episodes
2021–24	NCIS: Hawai'i	Ernie Malik	Main role
2022	NCIS	Ernie Malik	Crossover: "A Family Matter"
