= Fortis Films =

American film and television production company

- Type: Private
- Industry: Production company
- Founded: 1995; 31 years ago in California, U.S.
- Founder: Sandra Bullock
- Headquarters: Austin, Texas, U.S.; West Hollywood, California, U.S.
- Key people: Sandra Bullock (CEO)
- Owner: Sandra Bullock

Fortis Films is an American film and television production company founded in 1995 by actress and producer Sandra Bullock. It is known for producing the films Hope Floats (1998), Miss Congeniality (2000), Two Weeks Notice (2002), Miss Congeniality 2: Armed and Fabulous (2005) and The Lost City (2022), and the television series George Lopez.

== History ==
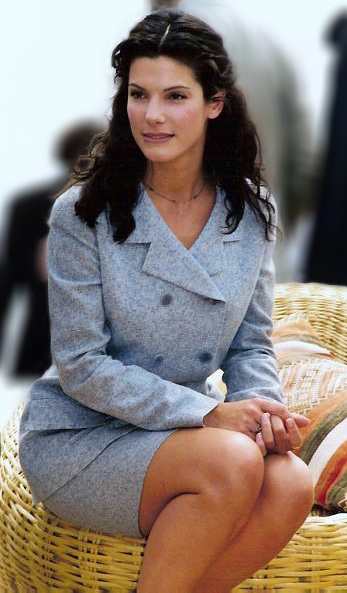
The company's founder Sandra Bullock in 1996

Fortis Films was founded in 1995 (and incorporated on April 16, 1996) in California, U.S. by American actress and producer Sandra Bullock. From 1995 to 2000, Bullock's sister, Gesine Bullock-Prado, was president of the company. The company is headquartered in Austin, Texas and West Hollywood, California.

In October 1997, the company signed a three year first-look deal with Warner Bros. Pictures from 1997 to 2000. In 1999, the company renewed its first-look deal with Warner Bros. In October 2003, the company signed a two-year extension of its first-look deal with Warner Bros.

== Filmography ==
=== Film ===
Year	Title	Director	Budget	Gross (worldwide)	Notes	Ref.
1998	Making Sandwiches	Sandra Bullock	—N/a	—N/a		
1998	Hope Floats	Forest Whitaker	$30 million	$81.5 million	with Lynda Obst Productions	
1998	Practical Magic	Griffin Dunne	$75 million	$68.3 million	with Di Novi Pictures and Village Roadshow Pictures	
2000	Miss Congeniality	Donald Petrie	$45 million	$212.8 million	with NPV Entertainment, Castle Rock Entertainment and Village Roadshow Pictures	
2000	Gun Shy	Eric Blakeney	$14 million	$3 million	with Hollywood Pictures	
2002	Two Weeks Notice	Marc Lawrence	$60 million	$200 million	with NPV Entertainment, Castle Rock Entertainment and Village Roadshow Pictures	
2005	Miss Congeniality 2: Armed and Fabulous	John Pasquin	$45 million	$101.3 million	with Castle Rock Entertainment and Village Roadshow Pictures	
2009	All About Steve	Phil Traill	$15 million	$40.1 million	with Fox 2000 Pictures	
2015	Our Brand Is Crisis	David Gordon Green	$28 million	$8.6 million	with Participant, RatPac-Dune Entertainment, and Smokehouse Pictures	
2021	The Unforgivable	Nora Fingscheidt	—N/a	$13,062 (Note: Limited theatrical release, currently the eighth most-watched film on Netflix within 28 days of release.)	with GK Films and Construction Film	
2022	The Lost City	Aaron and Adam Nee	$68 million	$192.9 million	with 3dot Productions and Exhibit A Films	
2026	Practical Magic 2	Susanne Bier	$75 million	$4.7 million	with Alcon Entertainment, Di Novi Pictures and Blossom Films	

==== In development ====
- Untitled Keanu Reeves and Sandra Bullock film (with The Mark Gordon Company, Prologue Entertainment, and Amazon MGM Studios)
- Untitled Sandra Bullock and Dana Fox film (with Foxy Inc. and Sony Pictures)

=== Television ===
Year	Title	Network	Notes	Ref.
2002–2007	George Lopez	ABC	with Mohawk Productions and Warner Bros. Television	
