= Way Back into Love =

Single by Hugh Grant featuring Drew Barrymore and Haley Bennett

from the album Music and Lyrics: Music from the Motion Picture
- Released: February 13, 2007
- Recorded: 2006
- Genre: Pop
- Length: 4:39 (Original Version); 3:52 (Demo Version)
- Label: Warner Sunset; Atlantic Records
- Songwriter(s): Adam Schlesinger

"Way Back into Love" is a pop song written by Adam Schlesinger, from the 2007 Warner Bros. Pictures film Music and Lyrics. There are two versions of the song: a demo version performed by Hugh Grant and Drew Barrymore and the final version performed by Grant and Haley Bennett. It was used as the love theme in the film, much of whose plot revolves around the writing and arranging of the song.

== Music video ==
The song's music video features Hugh Grant and Drew Barrymore singing the demo version. It also shows some clips from the film.

== Charts ==
Despite the fact that the song was not released as a single, it managed to chart in some Asian countries.

Chart (2007)	Peak position
South Korea Airplay Chart	11

Chart (2011)	Peak position
Austria (Ö3 Austria Top 40)	50
