= PoP! Goes My Heart =

Song by Hugh Grant / PoP!

from the album Music and Lyrics: Music from the Motion Picture
- Released: 2007
- Recorded: 2006
- Genre: Synth-pop, new wave
- Length: 3:16
- Label: Atlantic
- Composers: Andrew Wyatt, Alanna Vicente

"PoP! Goes My Heart" is a song from the movie Music and Lyrics, performed by Hugh Grant, as the singer from the fictional eighties band "PoP!". While not credited on the track itself (in the film's end credits), the second lead vocal performance is provided by the song's co-writer Andrew Wyatt. In the film, the song is categorized as a hit from 1984. It is a parody of the typical songs of the 1980s, including a music video featuring imagery common to the era. The music video plays during the introduction of the film (as well as the beginning of the end credits in the style of Pop-Up Video), and features Grant and Scott Porter.

During a Reddit AMA in 2016, Grant said that he likes to perform all the song's dance moves with his children every day.

== Reception ==
Joshua Starnes of ComingSoon.net praised the song, opining that the song was the "only genuinely funny moment" of the entire film. For the 10th anniversary of the film, Andrew Unterberger of Billboard praised the song's "faux-new wave" sound.
