= The Out-of-Towners (1999 film) =

1999 American film by Sam Weisman

- Theatrical release poster
- Directed by: Sam Weisman
- Screenplay by: Marc Lawrence
- Based on: The Out-of-Towners by Neil Simon
- Produced by: Robert Evans; Robert Cort; David Madden; Teri Schwartz
- Starring: Steve Martin; Goldie Hawn; Mark McKinney; John Cleese
- Cinematography: John Bailey
- Edited by: Kent Beyda
- Music by: Marc Shaiman
- Distributed by: Paramount Pictures
- Release date: April 2, 1999 (United States)
- Running time: 90 minutes
- Country: United States
- Language: English
- Budget: $40 million
- Box office: $28 million (US)

The Out-of-Towners is a 1999 American comedy film directed by Sam Weisman and starring Steve Martin and Goldie Hawn. It is a remake of the 1970 film of the same name written by Neil Simon and starring Jack Lemmon and Sandy Dennis.

The Out-of-Towners was released by Paramount Pictures on April 2, 1999 in the United States. The film received negative reviews from critics and was a box office bomb, grossing $28 million against a $40 million budget.

== Plot ==
Henry and Nancy Clark are a couple living in a quiet Ohio town. Married for 27 years, their last child Alan has left home for Europe and Nancy is suffering from empty nest syndrome.

Unbeknownst to Nancy, Henry has lost his job to corporate downsizing and has an interview in New York. She sneaks on the plane with him and they begin a disastrous series of misadventures.

Their plane is rerouted to Boston due to poor weather and their luggage is lost. They rent an overly expensive car after missing the train to NYC. They are mugged at gunpoint and, discover their daughter Susan has maxed out the only credit card Henry still has.

After the couple is thrown out of their hotel by the pompous manager Mersault, Nancy decides to find Susan at her apartment, but her untrusting neighbors run them off.

They duck into a church, inadvertently walking into a support group of Sexaholics Anonymous. Put on the spot to share, Nancy admits they have not had sex for months. When pressed for an explanation, Henry finally admits he got laid off, and the stress has taken his drive, which upsets Nancy as they are keeping secrets from each other.

They return to the hotel in search for their bags, where Nancy remembers there are travelers' checks. Since the bags haven’t arrived yet, they sneak into a bar and Nancy lets a man, Greg, hit on her to get his room key. Saying she will wait for him in his room while he is seeing a show for work, she and Henry order room service. Greg catches them, and calls the police.

Sneaking onto the balcony, they manage to slip onto the floor below, and see Mersault is secretly cross dressing using guests' clothing. Forced to live by their wits on the street, the couple get into a cab which had been stolen by thieves. Then they jump from the moving car and find themselves in Central Park.

Becoming amorous, the couple are discovered and then chased by the mounted police. They end up falling asleep in a lean-to in the park. Early in the morning, as Henry is relieving himself, he gets arrested for indecent exposure. Nancy blackmails Mersault into helping them.

In the end, Henry aces his job interview and he and Nancy begin a new life together in New York City. They take up permanent residency at the hotel. They (as well as Mersault openly in full drag) go to see their daughter Susan perform on Broadway.

== Cast ==
- Steve Martin as Henry Clark
- Goldie Hawn as Nancy Clark, Henry's wife
- John Cleese as Mr. Mersault
- Mark McKinney as Greg
- Joe Grifasi as Arresting Cop
- Gregory Jbara as Edward
- Josh Mostel as Dr. Faber
- Cynthia Nixon as Sheena
- Ernie Sabella as Getaway Driver
- Jack McGee as Sergeant Jordan
- Oliver Hudson as Alan Clark, Henry & Nancy's son and Susan's fraternal twin brother
- Jessica Cauffiel as Susan Clark, Henry & Nancy's daughter and Alan's fraternal twin sister

== Production ==
In December 1996, it was reported Paramount Pictures was in negotiations with Steve Martin and Goldie Hawn for a remake of The Out-of-Towners with the idea to do so originating from Robert Evans. Paramount had originally wanted screenwriter of the original, Neil Simon, to "contemporize" the material; however, Marc Lawrence ultimately wrote the script. By September 1997, it was announced that Martin and Hawn had agreed to star in the film which was set for a January 1998 production start. Peter Segal had initially been hired as director, but due to "creative differences" Segal left the film and was replaced by Sam Weisman. The movie was shot on location in New York City and featured a cameo by then-mayor Rudy Giuliani as himself.

Steve Martin and Goldie Hawn first worked together in Housesitter (1992).

Henry and Nancy Clark's son Alan is played by Goldie Hawn's real-life son, Oliver Hudson.

Much footage from the film was reportedly stolen, which resulted in many scenes having to be re-shot.

== Reception ==
The Out-of-Towners was a disappointment critically and commercially. It has a 28% rating on the Rotten Tomatoes website from 39 reviews. The site's consensus states: "Solid source material and a cast of talented comedians aren't enough to make The Out-of-Towners worth hosting on a screen of any size." Metacritic, which uses a weighted average, assigned the film a score of 33 out of 100, based on 21 critics, indicating "generally unfavorable" reviews.

Roger Ebert commented that the movie "was not a proud moment in the often-inspired careers of Martin and Hawn." Most of the negative reviews point to Cleese as the only redeeming factor of the film.

== See also ==
- List of American films of 1999
