= Noelle (2019 film) =

2019 film by Marc Lawrence

- Promotional poster
- Directed by: Marc Lawrence
- Written by: Marc Lawrence
- Produced by: Suzanne Todd
- Starring: Anna Kendrick; Bill Hader; Kingsley Ben-Adir; Billy Eichner; Julie Hagerty; Shirley MacLaine
- Cinematography: Russell Carpenter
- Edited by: Hughes Winborne
- Music by: Cody Fitzgerald; Clyde Lawrence
- Production company: Walt Disney Pictures
- Distributed by: Walt Disney Studios Motion Pictures
- Release date: November 12, 2019 (Disney+)
- Running time: 100 minutes
- Country: United States
- Language: English

Noelle is a 2019 American Christmas comedy film written and directed by Marc Lawrence, produced by Walt Disney Pictures and distributed by Walt Disney Studios Motion Pictures. The film stars Anna Kendrick, Bill Hader, Kingsley Ben-Adir, Billy Eichner, Julie Hagerty, and Shirley MacLaine with supporting roles done by Diana Maria Riva, Maceo Smedley, Jason Antoon, Michael Gross, and Billy Griffith. The film tells the story of the daughter of Santa Claus, who goes to look for her brother (who is next in line to become the new Santa Claus) when he does not return from a week off and enlists a private investigator to help find him. She must find her brother and bring him back in time for Christmas. It was filmed from October 2017 to January 2018 in British Columbia and Woodstock, Georgia.

Noelle was released on November 12, 2019, on Disney+. It received mixed reviews from critics.

== Plot ==
At the North Pole, preparations for the upcoming Christmas are quickly taking place. After the current Santa Claus's death five months prior, his son Nick Kringle is having difficulties trying to complete his training to become the next Santa. His younger sister Noelle who has been placed in charge of distributing and maintaining Christmas spirit, continues to support him, and even suggests taking the weekend off to avoid the stress and relax before the big day. Complying, Nick takes off overnight with the reindeer.

When the reindeer return the following weekend without Nick and Noelle admits to giving him controversial advice, the Christmas elves get disappointed in her and Nick's puffin friends get angry at her. The elf elders forcibly appoint her cousin Gabriel who works as the Kringles' tech support to become the new Santa. Guilt-stricken and forlorn, Noelle deduces that Nick fled to Phoenix, Arizona, and takes off with the sleigh and reindeer with her childhood nanny Polly.

They set down in the Desert Ridge Marketplace. With the permission of manager Helen Rojas and the customers' support and belief that it was a Christmas exhibit, Noelle sets out into the city to find Nick, leaving Polly to tend to the sleigh and reindeer. She meets and hires Jake Hapman, a private investigator as well as a recently divorced dad, to track down Nick. Noelle also interacts with Jake's enthusiastic son Alex and several other people, discovering that she can understand and communicate in other languages (including American Sign Language) as well as tell the naughty from the nice.

Jake tracks Nick down to a yoga studio where Nick is enthusiastic to see Noelle yet refuses to return north and become Santa. After a heated argument, Noelle leaves the building. She returns to the mall where her reindeer friend Snowcone arrives with a letter from Mrs. Claus informing her about the situation back home and ordering her to find and bring Nick back home. During Noelle's time away, Gabriel uses an algorithm to determine that there are only 2,837 "nice" children in the world, much to the horror of the elves and Mrs. Claus.

With help from Snowcone, Noelle tracks down Nick to a yoga retreat at the Desert Botanical Garden, and convinces him to return. Meeting up with her and Polly at the mall the next day, Noelle has him continue to train by being a mall Santa. While Nick sees the text message being sent to children from Gabriel, Jake discovers that Noelle told Alex about his Christmas wish, something that he finds awkward as his ex-wife remarried. Noelle reveals that she is Santa's daughter, causing him to leave. When Nick is accosted by the actual mall Santa, Noelle intervenes and accidentally hurts a police officer, resulting in her arrest and later hospitalization for psychological evaluation. Every kid gets a heads up text from Gabriel about how they behaved this year.

After a visit from Polly, who reveals her identity as an elf, Jake removes Noelle from the hospital and she makes her way back to the North Pole with Nick, Polly, and the reindeer before Christmas Eve.

Back home after a meeting with the elders, Nick nominates Noelle as the next Santa. This stirs up controversy throughout the town, but unanimously gains agreement from the elders when they determine that there is no rule against a female Santa and they are convinced she naturally has the skills. After a few mishaps including an awkward visit to a Jewish family, Noelle successfully delivers the presents across the world and drops Jake off at his ex-wife's house to spend time with Alex.

Noelle is celebrated at the North Pole as Gabriel happily returns to tech support, Nick opens up a yoga studio, and Polly becomes an elf elder. Noelle admits that she is proud to continue her father's legacy for being the 24th-generation Santa and that Christmas will go on.

== Cast ==
- Anna Kendrick as Noelle Kringle, the titular character, narrator, and Kris' daughter.
  - Oakley Bull as young Noelle
  - Taylor Bedford as teen Noelle
- Bill Hader as Nick Kringle, Kris' son and Noelle's brother who is in training to be the 23rd Santa.
  - Owen Vaccaro as young Nick
- Shirley MacLaine as Polly, a Christmas elf who's Noelle's childhood nanny.
- Kingsley Ben-Adir as Jake Hapman, a private detective Noelle befriends.
- Billy Eichner as Gabriel Kringle, Noelle and Nick's cousin and tech support worker who values cost-saving above the Christmas spirit.
- Julie Hagerty as Mrs. Kringle, Noelle and Nick's mother and Kris' wife.
- Diana Maria Riva as Helen Rojas, the manager of Desert Ridge Marketplace.
- Maceo Smedley as Alex Hapman, Jake's son.
- Jason Antoon as Omar
- Michael Gross as Elder Elf Abe, the leader of the Elf Elders.
- Billy Griffith as Elder Elf Billy, the member of the Elf Elders.
- Jay Brazeau as Kris Kringle, Noelle and Nick's father and the 22nd Santa.
- Ron Funches as Elf Mortimer
- Chelah Horsdal as Dr. Shelley Sussman
- Anna Van Hooft as Elf Mary
- Anthony Konechny as Elf Ted
- Burgess Jenkins as Dan
- Shaylee Mansfield as Michelle
- Gracie Lawrence as Elf Carol

== Production ==
On January 11, 2017, it was announced that Anna Kendrick would play the titular role of Santa Claus's daughter in the film, then titled Nicole, which would be written and directed by Marc Lawrence and produced by Suzanne Todd for Walt Disney Pictures. In July 2017, Bill Hader joined the cast. In September 2017, Billy Eichner and Shirley MacLaine joined the cast. In October 2017, Julie Hagerty and Maceo Smedley joined the cast. In November 2017, Michael Gross joined the cast.

Principal photography began in late-October 2017 in Vancouver, British Columbia, and later moved to Whistler Olympic Park in early-January 2018, where filming continued until January 19, 2018. The exterior for the shelter in Phoenix was St. James Anglican Church—the church's name can be seen in the Christmas Eve shot. Additional photography also took place in Woodstock, Georgia. Cody Fitzgerald and Clyde Lawrence composed the film's score.

== Release ==
The film was originally scheduled to be theatrically released on November 8, 2019, by Walt Disney Studios Motion Pictures. On February 8, 2018, it was revealed that the film, which had been retitled from Nicole to Noelle, would be released on Disney+ instead. It was released on November 12, 2019, four days after its original theatrical release date. It was released in the United Kingdom and Latin America on November 27, 2020.

== Reception ==
=== Critical response ===
The Review aggregator website Rotten Tomatoes reports an approval rating of 56% based on 41 reviews with an average rating of 5.2/10. The site's critics consensus reads: "The always charming Anna Kendrick does her best, but Noelle's progressive take on a timeless tale is unfortunately subdued." Metacritic, which uses a weighted average, assigned the film a score of 48 out of 100, based on 11 critics, indicating "mixed or average reviews".

Nick Allen of Roger Ebert.com gave the film a grade of three out of four stars, writing, "Noelle has more going for it than just being one of the easiest ways for Disney+ to make a good first impression. [...] Noelle has plenty of charm—the kind that makes a Christmas story not just simply amiable, but worth a look." Jennifer Green of Common Sense Media rated the movie a three out of five stars and wrote, "Noelle is appropriate for the whole family but will likely appeal most to grade-schoolers, who are likely to feel the most connection with its holiday-spirit messages, storylines, and humor, as well as with star Anna Kendrick. [...] The subplots of kids being deemed naughty or nice and families seeking togetherness and well-being over material possessions offer positive messages for all ages." Tim Robey of The Telegraph gave the film three out of five stars and stated, "It isn't exactly cinema's salvation, with a story that's a near-shameless retread of Jon Favreau's Elf, this time sticking Anna Kendrick in Will Ferrell's pointy shoes. But it's likeable stay-at-home fluff – the kind of thing you could stick on as mood music while you get the decorations out."

Matt Fowler of IGN rated the film 6.7 out of 10, indicating, "Noelle is a bouncy-yet-benign Christmas caper that, despite fun performances, falls short of instant greatness." Gwen Ihnat of The A.V Club rated the movie C+ and said: "Noelle has a few of those peppermint hot chocolate moments, but thanks to its bizarre warm-weather detour and wasting of a stellar cast, it just barely makes the nice list."

Emily St. James of Vox graded the movie 2.5 out of 5, stating, "Noelle frequently feels like it's running in place, frantically throwing shiny objects in your face in the hope you don't lose interest. But for fans of movie depictions of Christmas, there are worse options. The production design and costumes are sprightly and colorful, and Lawrence is terrific at keeping the story moving, even when it doesn't seem like it has any reason to keep going." Kate Erbland of IndieWire gave the film a C− rating and claimed, "Kendrick is delightful, but this Christmas comedy is a cheap holiday tchotchke with no staying power."

=== Accolades ===
Year	Award	Category	Nominee(s)	Result	Ref.
2021	BMI Film & TV Awards	BMI Streaming Film Award	Cody Fitzgerald, Clyde Lawrence	Won	

== See also ==
- List of Christmas films
- Santa Claus in film
