= Pop-Up Video =

- 2011 version of the logo
- Created by: Woody Thompson; Tad Low
- Starring: Various singers and groups
- Country of origin: United States
- No. of seasons: Original series: 6 Revived series: 2
- No. of episodes: 209

Production
- Running time: 22 minutes (per episode)

Original release
- Network: VH1 and VH1 Classic
- Release: October 27, 1996 – August 8, 2002
- Release: October 3, 2011 – September 21, 2012

Pop-Up Video is a VH1 television show that shows music videos annotated via "pop-up" bubbles — officially called "info nuggets" — containing trivia and witticisms relating to the video in question. The show was created by Woody Thompson and Tad Low and premiered October 27, 1996. For a time, it was the highest-rated program on VH1, though Behind the Music overtook it by 1998. It was originally produced by Spin the Bottle Inc., and later by Eyeboogie Inc. during its original run.

In October 2011, Pop-Up Video was revived by VH1, featuring new videos with new trivia and commentary. The revived production was continued by Eyeboogie Inc.

The show's pioneering use of pop-up bubbles to provide additional information about what is happening onscreen has seen many imitators and parodies, as well as some official licensed spinoffs, including Pop-Up Video UK.

== Format ==
Most episodes of Pop-Up Video play four or five music videos each, selected to include new, older, "classic", and "campy" videos. The bubbles that pop up in each video generally appear about every 10–15 seconds; their content is divided between information about the recording artist featured, the production of the video, and random facts inspired by the theme or content of the video. One of the show's staff writers is assigned to each video. Production costs for each episode total about $30,000.

The "random" information presented in bubbles frequently included statistics and demographics, medical, scientific, and historical trivia, definitions, and lists of a wide range of subjects. Gary Burns, in the Journal of Popular Film and Television, also notes as a recurring theme "the producers' attempt to turn practically every popped-up video into a dirty joke."

Often the film crew for the video in question would be interviewed in the research process; everyone from the director to make-up artists, choreographers, models, and extras might be used as sources. In addition, the producers solicited information by means of a phone line (displayed during the closing credits) and web site page. General facts are double- or triple-sourced, according to the producers.

== History ==
Thompson and Low previously worked together on Brandon Tartikoff's late night talk show Last Call, before it was cancelled in 1994. They spent the next two years making pitches of ideas for television shows to various networks; in late 1995, the original iteration of the show concept, titled Pop-Up Videos, was sent to VH1 executives, alongside a number of other concepts making use of aspects of songs or music videos. The pilot episode cost $3000 to produce; the first video to be played on the show was Tina Turner's "Missing You".

1997 saw Pop-Up Video's profile expand as popular news publications such as The New York Times, Newsweek, and Entertainment Weekly all produced articles about the show.

In 2000, Entertainment Weekly reported that Low was no longer involved with the production of the show.

== Specials and other versions ==
Special episodes of Pop-Up Video aired throughout the series' run. Many focused on specific artists, including VH1 staples Madonna, Culture Club, U2, Prince, and Elton John. Others ran on different themes, such as "Women First," "Road Trip," "Movies," and "Duets". There were also several holiday specials, including Halloween and several Christmas episodes. Some theme episodes broke with the show's format by including a montage of clips from many videos.

During a week of 1980s-themed programming on VH1 in March 1998, Pop-Up Video became Pop Up '80s. These episodes featured additional clips of 1980s news events and pop culture tidbits between music videos.

The 1996 VH1 Fashion Awards, Divas Live, The Oprah Winfrey Show (aired in syndication), several episodes of the Brady Bunch (aired on Nick at Nite in 2001, effectively named "Pop Up Brady"), ABC's Original TGIF 1998 and 1999 line-up's season premieres and Who Wants to Be a Millionaire (December 2000) also got the Pop Up treatment. Other proposals, such as a Pop-Up Video edition of the entirety of Grease during its 1998 theatrical re-release, were never realized. It was also used in a second version of the remake of the original 1974 Meow Mix commercial in 2002, which lacks the lyrics.

A United Kingdom-specific version entitled Pop-Up Video UK, aired on Channel 4, and still occasionally airs on VH1 UK and Europe. This version featured music videos by British artists such as Robbie Williams, Spice Girls, and Elvis Costello.

In January 2000, the spinoff program Pop Up Quiz debuted on VH1. Utilizing the same format as Pop-Up Video, the show presented trivia questions inspired by the content of each music video shown; for example, the game "Phil in the blank" was played over the video for "Sussudio" by Phil Collins. Launched at a time when the Pop-Up Video brand had become a "veritable franchise", the show was called a "weak spin-off" among several "duds" launched by the network at the time.

The 25th anniversary DVD release of The Rocky Horror Picture Show features a Pop Up video clip of one of the film's musical numbers, "Hot Patootie – Bless My Soul", as an extra on the second disc.

MSG Network currently airs a show called TXT MSG, which gives the "pop up" treatment to classic sporting events from MSG's library. This is an official Spin the Bottle production, and Low is credited as an executive producer.

== Controversy ==
Artists such as Billy Joel, Jakob Dylan of The Wallflowers, and The Police, as well as others such as director Mark Pellington and Sony Music Entertainment president Tommy Mottola, complained about what they perceived as harsh treatment on the show; the videos in which they were featured were often subsequently pulled. The show's creators called these the "Pops They Stopped." In contrast, some artists, including Joan Osborne and Paula Abdul, made appearances on the show to provide further information on their popped videos.

== Reception and commentary ==
Pop-Up Video is most frequently compared to the contemporaneous television programs Beavis and Butt-head and Mystery Science Theater 3000, which were known for their on-screen commentary ridiculing, respectively, music videos and films. As these shows were described as "TV-for-people-who-are-sick-of-TV", Pop-Up Video has been called "a show for people who hate videos".

== Reboot ==
VH1 ordered 60 new half-hour episodes of Pop-Up Video that started airing on October 3, 2011. In addition to the traditional music video format, five of the most popular episodes from season one of Jersey Shore were given the pop-up treatment in spring of 2012. A second season aired starting on August 6, 2012. The series was not renewed for a third season.

== Derivatives and parodies ==
Early on, the show's popularity led to several copycats, most notably on an episode of the ABC television series Sabrina, the Teenage Witch (September 19, 1997) and a series of Bell Atlantic commercials. Spin The Bottle, the creators of Pop-Up Video, publicly derided these Pop Up imitators on its website. Some series, such as NewsRadio, Family Guy, The Drew Carey Show, Bill Nye the Science Guy, High School Musical (and its sequels), Who Wants to Be a Millionaire, Cake Boss and Kate Plus 8 also featured special or repeat episodes that employed pop-up facts.

The History Channel series Pawn Stars and its spinoff, Cajun Pawn Stars, also employ the use of pop-up style notes when explaining the item being sold or pawned.

At the height of the show's popularity, MAD Magazine ran a series of Pop-Off Video takeoffs which mocked the artists, their fashions, their songs, and their music videos.

The North American anime distributor A.D. Vision (ADV Films) incorporated a feature on some of its DVD releases called "AD Vid-Notes," which provided trivia and cultural notes in pop-up bubbles when the feature was turned on. ADV-released shows incorporating the feature included Excel Saga and Magical Shopping Arcade Abenobashi.

A similar show is aired on the Argentine TV channel I.Sat. It is called Video Maní (peanut video), because the pop-ups are a 3-D rotating peanut. It features a series of true/false questions on things regarding the theme of the video, and after a few seconds it shows "true" or "false". As I.Sat is a movie channel, the videos are used as fill between movies.

Disney Channel occasionally uses Pop-Up styled videos during special airings of DCOMs, such as High School Musical 2 and Jump In!. These are referred to as the "What's What Edition".

The 2000 parody slasher Shriek If You Know What I Did Last Friday the 13th preceded the reveal with two protagonists being chased by the killer while a Pop-Up Video parody played to a cover of The Psychedelic Furs' "Pretty in Pink".

In 2001, Nick at Nite created Pop-Up Brady, which took select episodes of The Brady Bunch and added pop-up trivia notes collected by Woody Thompson from interviews with cast members. The NickMom series What Was Carol Brady Thinking? featured a Pop-Up Video-style format to show satirical thoughts of how Carol Brady regarded scenes during episodes of The Brady Bunch; this was a non-Spin the Bottle production and had no involvement from anyone with the Brady Bunch series, including Florence Henderson.

In 2006, NASCAR star Dale Earnhardt Jr. hosted Back in the Day with Dale Jr. which highlighted racing from the 60's and 70's with a Pop-Up Video style format.

At the end of the 2007 romantic comedy Music and Lyrics, the love story of characters Alex Fletcher and Sophie Fisher is epilogued in Pop-Up Video style, over the video for Alex and his old band's first hit, PoP! Goes My Heart".

In 2010, Nicktoons released a Pop-Up Video style format for all 61 episodes of Avatar: The Last Airbender entitled "Avatar Extras".

In 2014, HGTV released House Hunters Pop'd featuring families looking to purchase a home while trivia questions and facts pop up on the screen.

== See also ==
- Beavis and Butt-head
- Mystery Science Theater 3000
