= Marc Lawrence (filmmaker) =

American director, screenwriter, and producer

- Born: October 22, 1959 (age 66); Brooklyn, New York, U.S.
- Education: Binghamton University
- Occupations: Director; screenwriter; producer
- Years active: 1984–present
- Notable work: Two Weeks Notice; Music and Lyrics; Did You Hear About the Morgans? The Rewrite; Noelle
- Spouse: Linda Lawrence
- Children: 3, including Clyde and Gracie

Marc Lawrence (born October 22, 1959) is an American director, screenwriter, and producer.

Lawrence is best known for his numerous collaborations with Sandra Bullock and Hugh Grant. He wrote the comedy films Forces of Nature (1999), Miss Congeniality (2000), and Miss Congeniality 2: Armed and Fabulous (2005). He wrote and directed the comedy films Two Weeks Notice (2002), Music and Lyrics (2007), Did You Hear About the Morgans? (2009), The Rewrite (2014), and Noelle (2019).

== Early life ==
Lawrence was born on October 22, 1959, in Brooklyn. In 1981, he graduated from Binghamton University with a degree in English and attended New York University School of Law for one year.

== Career ==
Lawrence moved to Los Angeles after college and served as a staff writer and then supervising producer on NBC's Family Ties from 1984 to 1989.

Lawrence has written films such as Life with Mikey (1993), Forces of Nature (1999), the remake of The Out-of-Towners (1999), Miss Congeniality (2000), and its sequel Miss Congeniality 2: Armed and Fabulous (2005). He has both written and directed Two Weeks Notice (2002), Music and Lyrics (2007), Did You Hear About the Morgans? (2009), The Rewrite (2014), and Noelle (2019).

== Personal life ==
Lawrence met his wife, Linda, when he was in college. The couple lives in New York City and have three children: Clyde, Gracie, and Linus. Clyde and Gracie are the frontman and frontwoman of an 8-piece soul-pop band, Lawrence, and are signed to Jon Bellion's record label, Beautiful Mind Records.

== Filmography ==
=== Film ===
Year	Title	Director	Writer	Producer
1993	Life with Mikey	No	Yes	Co-producer
1999	Forces of Nature	No	Yes	No
1999	The Out-of-Towners	No	Yes	No
2000	Miss Congeniality	No	Yes	Executive
2002	Two Weeks Notice	Yes	Yes	No
2005	Miss Congeniality 2: Armed and Fabulous	No	Yes	Yes
2007	Music and Lyrics	Yes	Yes	No
2009	Did You Hear About the Morgans?	Yes	Yes	No
2014	The Rewrite	Yes	Yes	No
2019	Noelle	Yes	Yes	No

=== Television ===
The numbers in credits refer to the number of episodes.

Year	Title	Director	Writer	Executive Producer	Notes
1984–1989	Family Ties	No	Yes (30)	Supervising (29)	Also story editor (31 episodes)
1985	Family Ties Vacation	No	Yes	No	TV movie
1994	Sweet Valley High	Yes (1)	No	No	Episode: "The Curse of Lawrence Manson"
1994	Monty	No	Yes (1)	Yes (13)	Creator
1995	Pride & Joy	Yes (3)	Yes (3)	Yes (6)	Creator

=== Music ===
Year	Title	Film	Notes
2000	"Miss United States"	Miss Congeniality	Co-writer and producer
2002	"Baby (You've Got What It Takes)"	Two Weeks Notice	Harmonica accompaniment (as Blind Lemon Lipschitz)
2007	"Buddha's Delight"	Music and Lyrics	Co-writer
2007	"Bad Hot Witch"	Music and Lyrics	Co-writer
2007	"Love Autopsy"	Music and Lyrics	Writer
2007	"Slam"	Music and Lyrics	Co-writer
