= Miss Congeniality 2: Armed and Fabulous =

2005 film by John Pasquin

- Theatrical release poster
- Directed by: John Pasquin
- Written by: Marc Lawrence
- Based on: Characters by Marc Lawrence; Katie Ford; Caryn Lucas
- Produced by: Sandra Bullock; Marc Lawrence
- Starring: Sandra Bullock; Regina King; Enrique Murciano; William Shatner; Ernie Hudson; Heather Burns; Diedrich Bader; Treat Williams
- Cinematography: Peter Menzies Jr.
- Edited by: Garth Craven
- Music by: John Van Tongeren
- Production companies: Fortis Films; Castle Rock Entertainment; Village Roadshow Pictures
- Distributed by: Warner Bros. Pictures
- Release date: March 24, 2005 (United States)
- Running time: 115 minutes
- Country: United States
- Language: English
- Budget: $45 million
- Box office: $101.3 million

Miss Congeniality 2: Armed and Fabulous (also known as simply Miss Congeniality 2) is a 2005 American female buddy action comedy film and sequel to the 2000 film Miss Congeniality directed by John Pasquin and written by co-producer Marc Lawrence with the title role played once again by star and co-producer Sandra Bullock. William Shatner, Ernie Hudson, and Heather Burns also reprised their roles from the previous film with Regina King, Enrique Murciano, Diedrich Bader, and Treat Williams joining the cast.

Unable to resume undercover fieldwork for the FBI, agent Gracie Hart agrees to become the face of the agency rather than take a desk job. However, after Cheryl Frasier and Stan Fields are kidnapped, she makes it her mission to rescue them, dragging along her reluctant new partner, Sam.

Miss Congeniality 2: Armed and Fabulous was released by Warner Bros. Pictures on March 24, 2005. It grossed over $101 million worldwide and received negative reviews from critics.

== Plot ==
Weeks after her assignment at the Miss United States beauty pageant, (Note: As depicted in Miss Congeniality (2000)) FBI agent Gracie Hart's cover is blown when her newfound fame results in her being recognized while undercover trying to prevent a bank heist. With Gracie too recognizable to perform fieldwork, she is given the choice between a desk job and a new role as a spokesperson for the FBI.

After being dumped by her boyfriend, fellow agent Eric Matthews, Gracie accepts the position as the "new face of the FBI". Assigned to work with her is Sam Fuller, a recent transfer from Chicago who has difficulty working with others. With the help of her new stylist Joel Myers, Gracie begins to embrace her new position, making television appearances and publishing a book about the Miss United States operation.

Meanwhile, pageant winner Cheryl Fraser and host Stan Fields are kidnapped by brothers Lou and Karl Steele, who hold them for ransom. Gracie is tasked with going to Las Vegas, where the kidnappings took place, to hold a press conference. She is accompanied by Joel and Sam, who reluctantly agrees to serve as Gracie's bodyguard.

In Las Vegas, Gracie begins to investigate the kidnappings on her own, against the wishes of bureau chief Walter Collins. She learns that Cheryl and Stan's limo driver was paid off by a Dolly Parton impersonator to give the kidnappers an opportunity to make their move. When Gracie believes she spots the impersonator and apprehends the person, she later discovers it is the real Dolly Parton. The incident receives considerable media attention, causing a furious Collins to order Gracie and Sam back to New York City.

Reviewing surveillance tapes at the airport, Gracie realizes that the kidnappers were not after Cheryl, as originally suspected, but after Stan. Gracie, Sam, and Joel return to Las Vegas with the assistance of local agent Jeff Foreman. The four infiltrate the nursing home where Stan's mother lives and learn that he has a gambling addiction, suggesting that Stan was kidnapped by loan sharks over his debts.

Jeff searches an FBI database to find possible suspects but is caught by Collins, who once again orders Gracie, Sam, and Joel back to New York. Before leaving the building, Gracie sees a ransom video of Cheryl sent by the kidnappers. At the airport, Gracie and Sam fight, revealing what Sam calls "the real Gracie Hart", as opposed to her media-friendly image. The two, along with Joel and Jeff, again escape FBI custody and head to the Oasis Drag Club, where the only Dolly Parton impersonator in Las Vegas performs.

With Sam as a Tina Turner impersonator and Gracie and Joel dressed as showgirls, Gracie and Sam perform to "Proud Mary", earning them access to the club's dressing room. The Dolly Parton impersonator tells them that Karl Steele, a former coworker at Treasure Island, forced him to bribe Cheryl and Stan's limo driver. Collins leads an FBI raid on Lou and Karl's house, only to discover it deserted. Gracie deduces from coded language Cheryl used in the ransom video that she and Stan have been taken to Treasure Island.

Once there, Gracie and Sam fight Lou and Karl. Karl reveals that Cheryl and Stan are tied up inside one of the hotel's pirate ships, which is scheduled to sink. Gracie rescues Stan and Cheryl but finds herself trapped underwater when her costume becomes pinned beneath a cannon; Sam arrives to save her.

Cheryl and Jeff strike up a romance, and Gracie bumps the fame-hungry Collins into the water when he tries to take credit for the rescue. Gracie leaves her spokesperson position to return to fieldwork, with Sam as her new partner.

== Cast ==
- Sandra Bullock as Gracie Hart
- Regina King as Sam Fuller
- Enrique Murciano as Jeff Foreman
- William Shatner as Stan Fields
- Ernie Hudson as McDonald
- Heather Burns as Cheryl
- Diedrich Bader as Joel
- Treat Williams as Collins
- Abraham Benrubi as Lou Steele
- Nick Offerman as Karl Steele
- Eileen Brennan as Carol Fields
- Elisabeth Röhm as Janet
- Leslie Grossman as Pam
- Lusia Strus as Janine
- Adam Lefevre as a bartender

In addition, Regis Philbin, Joy Philbin, Octavia Spencer, and Dolly Parton make cameo appearances as themselves, while Las Vegas television news anchor Sue Tripathi of KVBC-TV (now KSNV) briefly appears as a CNN reporter.

== Production ==
Sandra Bullock and writer Marc Lawrence initially had no plans for a sequel. While working on Two Weeks Notice, Bullock and Lawrence joked about ideas for a Miss Congeniality sequel, some of which "weren't that far-fetched" according to Bullock. Las Vegas was featured in an early version of the first film, but was ultimately written out of the script. A five-week shoot in southern Nevada began on April 12, 2004. Approximately half of the film's scenes were scheduled to be shot in Las Vegas.

Major filming locations included the Treasure Island and Venetian resorts. Scenes shot at Treasure Island included its Sirens of TI pirate show, which had never been featured in a film before and was closed to the public for filming. Other filming locations included the Welcome to Fabulous Las Vegas sign and the Klondike Hotel and Casino. In May 2004, filming took place at the Lloyd D. George Federal District Courthouse, which served as FBI headquarters within the film. Filming in Las Vegas concluded in mid-May 2004, and moved to Los Angeles for six weeks of shooting, followed by a brief shoot in New York. Bullock also produced the film, and said, "It does make for a schizophrenic experience. There are times when I'd rather be performing."

Bullock commented during the film's promotion on the type of story she wanted to tell:

I want women to be able to do the same thing that men get to do in comedies and say, 'That's a comedy.' Why does it always have to be a romantic comedy? Why does the girl have to end up with the guy? Why can't it be a buddy film?

== Reception ==
=== Box office ===
For its opening weekend, Miss Congeniality 2: Armed and Fabulous ranked second behind Guess Who with a three-day gross of $14.5 million and a combined four-day gross of $17.6 million. The film grossed $101 million worldwide.

=== Critical response ===
The film received negative reviews from critics. On Rotten Tomatoes, it has an approval rating of 15% based on 146 reviews. The critical consensus reads: "Sandra Bullock is still as appealing as ever; too bad the movie is not pageant material." On Metacritic, the film has a score of 34 out of 100, based on reviews from 33 critics, indicating "generally unfavorable reviews". Audiences surveyed by CinemaScore gave the film a grade B.

Lisa Schwarzbaum of Entertainment Weekly stated that the film "isn't exactly good - like Legally Blonde 2, it's a more exaggerated, less buoyant sequel to what should have been a one-off comedy - but it's enjoyable." In a two-and-a-half out of five review, Randy Cordova of the The Arizona Republic explained that "you figure Bullock would have learned her lesson about sequels after the Speed 2 fiasco. MC2 isn't that bad, but it puts its star's charms to the test." Robert Koehler of Variety called the film "Lame and inoffensive". Roger Ebert for the Chicago Sun-Times calls the sequel "doubly unnecessary" and says "there is no good reason to go and actually see it."

== Home media ==
The film's DVD and VHS edition was released in 2005. In 2009, a double feature edition was released that included the first film.

== See also ==
- List of films set in Las Vegas
