= Forces of Nature (1999 film) =

1999 film directed by Bronwen Hughes

- Theatrical release poster
- Directed by: Bronwen Hughes
- Written by: Marc Lawrence
- Produced by: Susan Arnold; Ian Bryce; Donna Arkoff Roth
- Starring: Sandra Bullock; Ben Affleck; Maura Tierney; Steve Zahn; Blythe Danner; Ronny Cox
- Cinematography: Elliot Davis; David Stockton
- Edited by: Craig Wood
- Music by: John Powell
- Production company: Roth–Arnold Productions
- Distributed by: DreamWorks Pictures
- Release date: March 19, 1999
- Running time: 105 minutes
- Country: United States
- Language: English
- Budget: $75 million
- Box office: $93.9 million

Forces of Nature is a 1999 American romantic comedy film directed by Bronwen Hughes, and starring Ben Affleck and Sandra Bullock alongside Maura Tierney, Steve Zahn, Blythe Danner, and Ronny Cox.

Ben and Sarah meet when their plane to Savannah has a birdstrike before takeoff. As they both urgently need to arrive there as soon as possible, they band together, having many misadventures along the way.

The film was released in US theaters on March 19, 1999 by DreamWorks Pictures, receiving mixed reviews from critics while grossing $93.9 million against a $75 million budget.

== Plot ==
Ben Holmes is a "blurb" writer responsible for writing the short introductions on the sleeves of hardcover books. On his way from his home in NYC to Savannah, Georgia for his wedding to Bridget, he is already anxious about flying. His nerves worsen when he is seated next to Sarah, a free-spirited drifter who talks to Ben immediately.

On takeoff, the plane suffers a birdstrike. Now terrified to get on another plane, Ben shares a car rental with Sarah and another passenger, Vic.

Numerous obstacles arise to prevent Ben from getting to his wedding. It starts with Vic smoking marijuana while driving, getting them arrested. Ben and Sarah manage to get released then get train tickets to Georgia. During an unscheduled stop en route, Sarah climbs on top of a car and shouts to hear her voice echo across the surrounding landscape. Ben hesitantly joins her. When they climb back down, they discover that their car has been decoupled from the train and they are now headed to Chicago.

After disembarking from the moving train, they shelter from the rain in a KMart where they buy dry clothes and bond while discussing Ben's insecurity about getting married. Sarah reveals that she has already been married twice and is traveling to Savannah to collect a large sum of money from the sale of a bagel shop that she opened with her now estranged husband, Carl.

The next day, Sarah discovers Carl is attempting to thwart the sale. She asks Ben to pretend to be her husband once in Savannah, explaining that she plans to give the money to her 10 year-old son from her first marriage, who she has not seen in two years, to mend fences between them. Ben agrees to help, so Sarah convinces him to pretend to be her surgeon husband to charm their way onto a Florida-bound bus of retirees.

At the first overnight stop, Ben finds himself increasingly attracted to Sarah. He encounters his best man, Alan and Bridget's maid of honor, Debbie in the hotel lobby. They soon learn of Ben and Sarah's deception, which Debbie believes includes infidelity to Bridget. Furious, she hurries to Savannah with Alan to tell the bride.

In their hotel room, Ben angrily blames Sarah for disrupting his life. She accuses him of being afraid to live honestly. They begin to kiss, but Ben stops himself and they leave to collect the money his parents have wired him, only to discover the bank is on fire. Ben and Sarah both laugh hysterically, wondering what else could go wrong, and begin kissing again. Back at the hotel the retirees have discovered their lie and confront them, so they flee.

Seeing a cheap car for sale in town, Sarah offers to striptease in a local bar to raise the money for it. The bartender asks Ben to dance instead, as it is a gay bar. He is nervous at first, but soon gets into the dance and earns enough to buy the car.

On the road to Savannah, Ben tells Sarah he is prepared to cancel the wedding, but she says it would be rash after only knowing each other a short time. A hurricane approaches Savannah, and the harsh weather forces them to abandon the convertible and run the rest of the way to the wedding. When Ben finds Bridget, he realizes he does love her and wants to spend his life with her. Sarah witnesses their reunion and leaves quietly.

Ben and Bridget go on their honeymoon and get married in Hawaii. Sarah visits her son and reconciles with him. Ben states in a voiceover that, wherever Sarah is, he hopes she has found happiness.

== Cast ==
- Sandra Bullock as Sarah Lewis
- Ben Affleck as Ben Holmes
- Maura Tierney as Bridget Cahill
- Steve Zahn as Alan
- Blythe Danner as Virginia Cahill
- Ronny Cox as Hadley Cahill
- Richard Schiff as Joe
- Anne Haney as Emma
- Janet Carroll as Barbara Holmes
- Michael Fairman as Richard Holmes
- Meredith Scott Lynn as Debbie
- David Strickland as Steve Montgomery
- John Doe as Carl Lewis
- Steve Hytner as Jack Bailey
- Jack Kehler as Vic DeFranco
- George D. Wallace as Max
- Afemo Omilami as Cab Driver
- Bert Remsen as Ned
- Bill Erwin as Murray
- Shelly Desai as Cabbie

== Production ==
Filming took place over three days at South of the Border, a tourist attraction near Dillon, South Carolina, and in Savannah, Georgia. The Joseph Johnson House, a private home on Craven Street in Beaufort, South Carolina known as "The Castle", was used as the Cahill house.

The Main Terminal at Dulles International Airport is used to film scenes as a fictionalized New York City airport.

== Release ==
=== Home media ===
Forces of Nature was released on DVD, VHS, and LaserDisc on September 14, 1999.

== Reception ==
=== Box office ===
Forces of Nature collected $13.5 million during its opening weekend, ranking in first place at the box office above True Crime and Analyze This. In its second weekend, it would then earn $9.4 million, beating out newcomers EDtv, The Mod Squad and Doug's 1st Movie. The film was overtaken by The Matrix in its third weekend after spending two weeks at the number one spot.

=== Critical response ===
On Rotten Tomatoes, the film has an approval rating of 46% based on 67 reviews, with an average rating of 5.3/10. The website's critics consensus reads, "A distinct lack of chemistry between Ben Affleck and Sandra Bullock, coupled with a screwball sensibility that's a touch too screwy, scupper Forces of Nature's modest ambition to serve up romantic charm." On Metacritic, the film has a weighted average score of 46 out of 100, based on 26 critics, indicating "mixed or average" reviews. Audiences surveyed by CinemaScore gave the film an average grade of "B−" on scale of A+ to F.
