= Two Weeks Notice =

2002 film directed by Marc Lawrence

- Theatrical release poster
- Directed by: Marc Lawrence
- Written by: Marc Lawrence
- Produced by: Sandra Bullock
- Starring: Sandra Bullock; Hugh Grant; Alicia Witt; Dana Ivey; Robert Klein; Heather Burns
- Cinematography: László Kovács
- Edited by: Susan E. Morse
- Music by: John Powell
- Production companies: Castle Rock Entertainment; Village Roadshow Pictures; NPV Entertainment; Fortis Films
- Distributed by: Warner Bros. Pictures
- Release date: December 20, 2002
- Running time: 101 minutes
- Country: United States
- Language: English
- Budget: $60 million
- Box office: $199 million

Two Weeks Notice is a 2002 American romantic comedy film written and directed by Marc Lawrence and starring Sandra Bullock and Hugh Grant, with Alicia Witt, Dana Ivey, Robert Klein, and Heather Burns in supporting roles. In the film, an idealistic, liberal lawyer (Bullock) goes to work for a narcissistic, billionaire developer (Grant) and they form an unlikely pair.

The film was released in the United States on December 20, 2002, by Warner Bros. Pictures. It received mixed reviews from critics and grossed $199 million worldwide.

== Plot ==
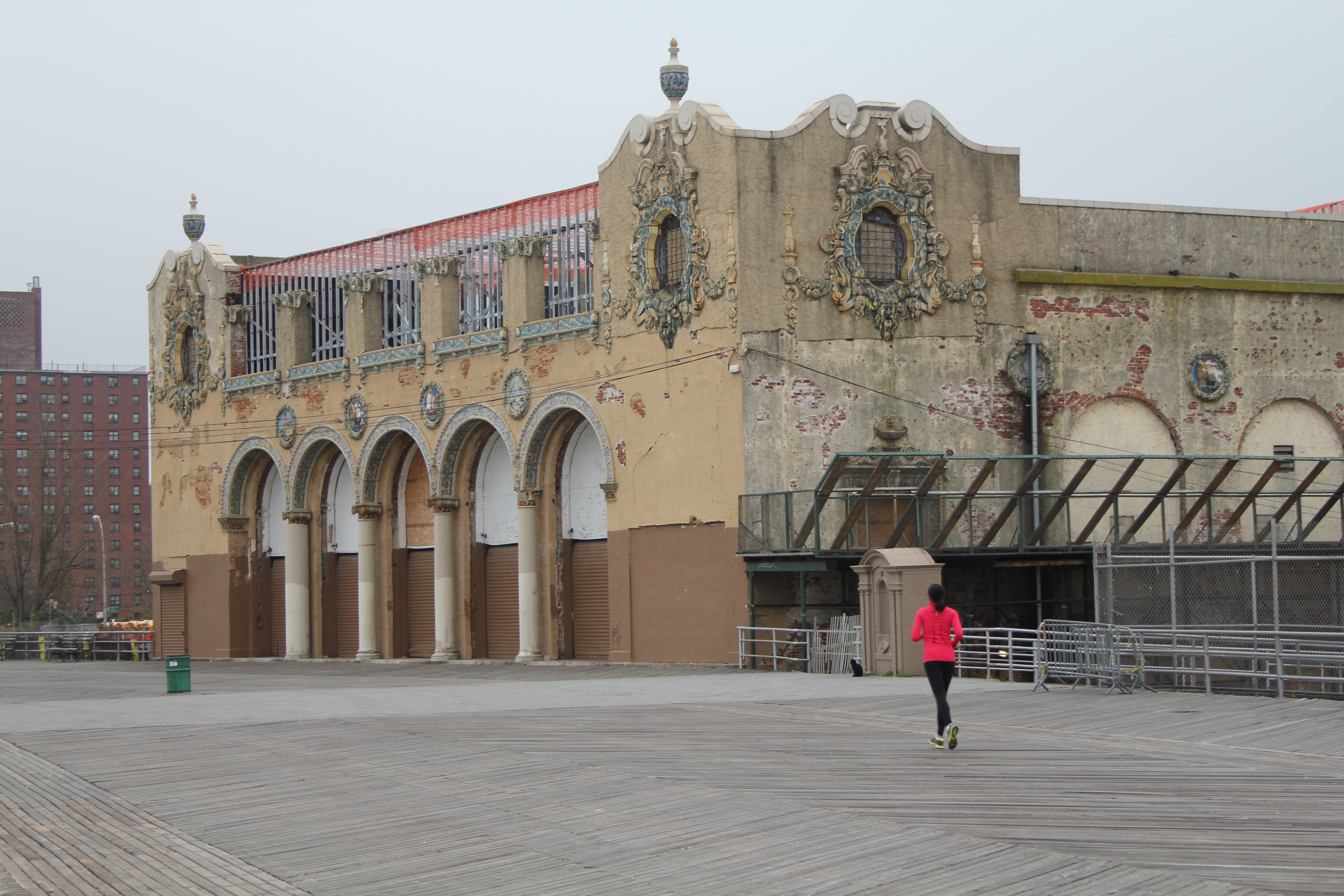
The "Coney Island community center" Lucy wants to preserve was actually the Childs Restaurant location on Coney Island's Riegelmann Boardwalk. It was declared a New York Landmark a month after the film's premiere. It closed later (as in this 2013 picture) and, after renovation, became part of the Ford Amphitheater at Coney Island.

Lucy Kelson is a lawyer, who specializes in historic preservation, environmental law, and pro bono cases in New York City. George Wade is a real estate developer and playboy who has grown up in a life of luxury. Lucy's hard work and devotion to others contrasts sharply with George's childish recklessness and insensitivity to others. George is the face of his company and works alongside his greedy brother Howard, who is more responsible and mature.

Lucy meets George in an attempt to stop the destruction of the Coney Island community center she grew up with. Learning that she graduated from the prestigious Harvard Law School, he asks to hire her to replace his old Chief Counsel, overlooking their opposing views of real estate development. She decides the benefits he offers in discretionary funding for causes she supports outweigh the negatives, especially as he promises to protect the community center.

Lucy finds what George really requires is advice in all aspects of his life. She regretfully becomes his indispensable assistant, and he calls at all times for the next few years. After Lucy is disrupted at a friend's wedding by George's latest "emergency" (what to wear to an event he is attending), she gives him two weeks' notice of resignation.

Lucy looks for work at other firms, but George has called in advance asking them not to hire her, so he can keep her on. Eventually, he admits defeat and she offers to help him find a replacement, unaware of how close and interdependent they have become. Lucy's boyfriend Ansel, who is always away with Greenpeace, breaks up with her over the phone and she is consoled by George on his private yacht. She gets drunk, brags about how good she is at sex, and kisses George before passing out. When she wakes up the next morning, she has forgotten about what happened the night before.

New Harvard graduate June Carver is finally hired as Lucy's replacement, and she becomes increasingly close with George, making Lucy jealous. At a business event, June kisses George and they go to his room. Lucy learns that despite George's promise, the community center is going to be demolished in favour of a new real estate project, so goes to confront him on his apparent betrayal. Arriving at his hotel, she finds George and June in his suite in their underclothes during a game of "strip chess". George confronts Lucy the next day, her last day at work, where she reminds him he promised her to spare the community center and storms out.

After Lucy is gone, George realizes his time with her has demonstrated that he needs to change. Meanwhile, in her new job, Lucy realizes she misses him. George goes in search of Lucy and reveals he decided to keep his promise to her and chose not to demolish the center. She initially rebuffs him, but overcome with tears over the revelation, runs after him. The pair declare their feelings, and George reveals he has resigned. They kiss in the middle of the sidewalk and go to the small apartment Lucy shares with her parents.

The DVD version of the film includes an unreleased scene of George and Lucy's wedding at the community center attended by family and friends.

== Cast ==
- Sandra Bullock as Lucy Kelson
- Hugh Grant as George Wade
- Alicia Witt as June Carver
- Dana Ivey as Ruth Kelson
- Robert Klein as Larry Kelson
- Heather Burns as Meryl Brooks
- David Haig as Howard Wade
- Dorian Missick as Tony
- Janine LaManna as Elaine Cominsky

In addition, Jason Antoon portrays Norman and Sharon Wilkins plays Polly St. Clair, while Mike Piazza, Donald Trump, and Norah Jones make cameo appearances as themselves.

== Production ==
Director Marc Lawrence suffered headaches, sinus infections, and a slipped disc while making the film, as well as having root canal treatment. Lawrence previously wrote the films Forces of Nature and Miss Congeniality, which starred Bullock, and it was on the latter film where he asked her to look at his unfinished script. Bullock liked it enough to star in and produce the film. Grant was first choice for the part, he and Bullock had already wanted to work together. Lawrence hoped the film would be different enough for Grant, not the same as his Notting Hill character, but not as unpleasant as his Bridget Jones's Diary character. Filming took place in New York City, and was noted as the first Hollywood production to take place there after the September 11 attacks.

== Release ==
The film was theatrically released on December 20, 2002.

=== Home media ===
Two Weeks Notice was released on DVD in the United States on April 29, 2003.

== Soundtrack ==
The soundtrack music to Two Weeks Notice was released on January 28, 2003.

No.	Title	Artist	Length
1.	"Love Theme"	John Powell	1:38
2.	"Divorce"	John Powell	1:24
3.	"Take Away"	John Powell	2:41
4.	"Trying to Get Fired"	John Powell	1:31
5.	"Helicopter Ride"	John Powell	2:31
6.	"In the Limo"	John Powell	0:51
7.	"Bobcat Pretzel"	John Powell	3:15
8.	"Protest"	John Powell	1:26
9.	"Interviews"	John Powell	0:44
10.	"Emergency"	John Powell	1:40
11.	"Absolutely Beautiful"	John Powell	2:41
12.	"Sad Bowels"	John Powell	2:51
13.	"George's Speech"	John Powell	2:44
14.	"Finale"	John Powell	3:41
15.	"Epilogue"	John Powell	0:41
Total length:			30:19

== Reception ==
=== Critical response ===
On the review aggregator website Rotten Tomatoes, 42% of 123 critics' reviews are positive, with an average rating of 5.3/10. The website's consensus reads: "Though Two Weeks Notice has nothing new to add to the crowded genre, Hugh Grant and Sandra Bullock make the movie a pleasant, if predictable, sit." Metacritic, which uses a weighted average, assigned the film a score of 42 out of 100, based on 30 critics, indicating "mixed or average" reviews. Audiences polled by CinemaScore gave the film an average grade of "B+" on an A+ to F scale.

Roger Ebert of the Chicago Sun-Times gave the film 3 out of 4 and wrote: "… some of the dialogue has a real zing to it. There were wicked little one-liners that slipped in under the radar and nudged the audience in the ribs." Lisa Schwarzbaum of Entertainment Weekly wrote that it "Knows what it needs to do for both its stars, does it, and doesn't make a federal case about it. I'd watch these two together again in a New York minute." David Rooney of Variety called it: "An affable but undernourished romantic comedy that fails to match the freshness of the actress-producer and writer's previous collaboration, "Miss Congeniality.""

=== Box office ===
Two Weeks Notice opened at number two domestically, behind The Lord of the Rings: The Two Towers, and spent its first five weeks in the Top 10 at the box office. It grossed $93.3 million in the United States and Canada, and $105.7 million in other territories, for a worldwide total of $199 million, against a budget of $60 million.

== Punctuation issue ==
In the best-selling book on punctuation Eats, Shoots & Leaves: The Zero Tolerance Approach to Punctuation, author Lynne Truss wrote that the spelling of the film's title is grammatically incorrect because it is missing an apostrophe (Two Weeks' Notice). The book's original hardcover edition featured Truss in her author's photo, glaring at the poster and holding a marker where the apostrophe should be.
