= Did You Hear About the Morgans? =

2009 film by Marc Lawrence

- Theatrical release poster
- Directed by: Marc Lawrence
- Written by: Marc Lawrence
- Produced by: Martin Shafer; Liz Glotzer
- Starring: Hugh Grant; Sarah Jessica Parker; Sam Elliott; Mary Steenburgen; Elisabeth Moss; Michael Kelly; Wilford Brimley
- Cinematography: Florian Ballhaus
- Edited by: Susan E. Morse
- Music by: Theodore Shapiro
- Production companies: Columbia Pictures; Relativity Media; Castle Rock Entertainment; Banter Films
- Distributed by: Sony Pictures Releasing
- Release date: December 18, 2009
- Running time: 103 minutes
- Country: United States
- Language: English
- Budget: $58 million
- Box office: $85.3 million

Did You Hear About the Morgans? is a 2009 American romantic comedy thriller film directed and written by Marc Lawrence. Hugh Grant and Sarah Jessica Parker portray the film's protagonists, Paul and Meryl Morgan, a recently separated New York City power couple on the verge of divorce until they witness the murder of Meryl's client. They are forced to enter into temporary witness protection, given new identities, and relocated to a small Wyoming town (the fictional Ray, Wyoming, 45 minutes out of Cody). Supporting roles are played by Sam Elliott, Mary Steenburgen, Elisabeth Moss, and Wilford Brimley. It is the second collaboration of Grant and Parker, following the 1996 film Extreme Measures.

The film premiered in New York on December 14, 2009, and in London the following day. It was released in the United States on December 18 and to most of Europe in January 2010. It received generally negative reviews from critics. The film grossed $6,616,571 in its opening weekend and earned $85 million worldwide.

== Plot ==
A successful Manhattan couple, lawyer Paul Morgan and real estate agent Meryl Morgan are separated due to Paul's infidelity. After dinner one night, Meryl and Paul witness the murder of one of Meryl's real estate clients. As a result, they become targets of contract killer Vincent and must enter the Witness Protection Program.

Paul and Meryl are relocated to the small town of Ray, Wyoming, and placed temporarily under the protection of husband and wife U.S. Deputy Marshals, Clay and Emma Wheeler. For their safety, they are permitted no outside contact by telephone or e-mail. They have trouble adjusting to small-town life, but after a perilous encounter with a bear and awkward attempts at shooting rifles, chopping wood, and horseback riding, they eventually adjust and begin assisting the local citizens professionally. Meanwhile, neither of their assistants back in New York City knows their whereabouts. Meryl secretly calls the adoption agency she's been trying to adopt through to let them know she won't be able to go through with the adoption. Vincent plants a bug at Meryl's office and in her assistant Jackie's purse, hoping to gain information, which is eventually successful when Jackie hears from the adoption agency that Meryl called and what number she used.

Jackie attempts to call Meryl but Paul's assistant Adam stops her by kissing her, which she responds to by tasering him and then apologizing, and suggesting that he take her on a date the next day. Paul and Meryl go on a "date" in town and begin to reconcile, discussing the stress of infertility that led to their relationship deteriorating and Paul's subsequent infidelity. They get back together, but then Paul is heartbroken when he learns that Meryl had a one-night stand with one of their acquaintances during their separation. The next day, with Vincent in town unbeknownst to them, the Morgans anticipate leaving Ray for a permanent hiding place. The Wheelers invite them to a rodeo, but the Morgans are at loggerheads, so they decline. Leaving the Morgans without any security, the Wheelers leave for the rodeo. Vincent tries to attack the house but is accosted by a bear, which gives the Morgans time to escape. They flee on horseback to the rodeo to seek help. Vincent follows them to the rodeo where they spot him and hide in a bull suit. However, they end up in the ring with a bull, which then charges them, injuring Meryl. Meryl, unable to walk, stays hidden from Vincent while Paul impulsively confronts him with a canister of bear repellent spray. Paul accidentally sprays himself in the face, alerting Vincent who then holds Paul at gunpoint. The Morgans are rescued by the Wheelers and their new friends from the town.

Six months later, Jackie and Adam are in a committed relationship while Paul and Meryl have repaired their marriage. They have an adopted baby girl from China, named Rae in honor of the Wyoming town, and Meryl is pregnant with their biological child, living happily together in New York City.

== Cast ==
- Hugh Grant as Paul Morgan
- Sarah Jessica Parker as Meryl Morgan
- Sam Elliott as Clay Wheeler
- Mary Steenburgen as Emma Wheeler
- Elisabeth Moss as Jackie Drake
- Michael Kelly as Vincent
- Wilford Brimley as Earl Granger
- Jesse Liebman as Adam Feller
- David Call as Doc D. Simmons
- Kim Shaw as Nurse Kelly
- Seth Gilliam as U.S. Marshal Lasky
- Gracie Bea Lawrence as Lucy Granger
- Christopher Atwood as Rodeo
- Kevin Brown as U.S. Marshal Henderson
- Steven Boyer as U.S. Marshal Ferber
- Bart the Bear 2 as Bear

== Production ==
The film's setting of Ray, Wyoming, was based on Meeteetse, Wyoming.

Filming for Did You Hear About the Morgans took place over 25 days in May and June 2009. The film was shot in New York City; Galisteo, New Mexico; Los Alamos, New Mexico; Santa Fe, New Mexico; Val Kilmer's Ranch, Pecos, New Mexico; and Roy, New Mexico. Bart the Bear 2 was trained by professional employees of Heber City, Utah's Wasatch Rocky Mountain Wildlife.

== Reception ==
=== Critical response ===
On the review aggregator website Rotten Tomatoes, 12% of 121 critics' reviews are positive, with an average rating of 3.6/10. The website's consensus reads: "It gets a certain amount of mileage out of the inherent likability of its stars, but with an unfunny script and a lack of onscreen chemistry, Did You Hear About the Morgans? falls flat." Metacritic, which uses a weighted average, assigned the film a score of 27 out of 100, based on 28 critics, indicating "generally unfavorable" reviews. Audiences surveyed by CinemaScore gave the film a grade "B−" on scale of A to F.

John Anderson of Variety magazine wrote: "The charm of the film is that it resists turning people into cliches and lets Parker and Grant work their particular magic -- before they get to Wyoming, their performances are as stressed out as their characters, and while it's a dubious conceit that going cowboy is a cure-all, they put the notion across as convincingly as possible."

=== Box office ===
In its opening weekend, the film opened at #4 at the United States box office earning $6,616,571. With a budget of $58 million, Did You Hear About the Morgans? grossed $29.5 million domestically at the box office. It did better internationally, earning an additional $56 million, for a total of $85 million worldwide.

== Home media ==
Did You Hear About the Morgans? was released on DVD and Blu-ray on March 16, 2010.

The DVD features:

- Audio commentary with director Lawrence, and stars Grant and Parker
- 5 featurettes
- Deleted scenes
- Outtakes
