= Miss Congeniality (film) =

2000 film by Donald Petrie

- Theatrical release poster
- Directed by: Donald Petrie
- Written by: Marc Lawrence; Katie Ford; Caryn Lucas
- Produced by: Sandra Bullock
- Starring: Sandra Bullock; Michael Caine; Benjamin Bratt; Candice Bergen; William Shatner; Ernie Hudson
- Cinematography: László Kovács
- Edited by: Billy Weber
- Music by: Edward Shearmur
- Production companies: Castle Rock Entertainment; Village Roadshow Pictures; Fortis Films
- Distributed by: Warner Bros. Pictures
- Release date: December 22, 2000
- Running time: 110 minutes
- Country: United States
- Language: English
- Budget: $45 million
- Box office: $212.7 million

Miss Congeniality is a 2000 American action comedy film directed by Donald Petrie, written by Marc Lawrence, Katie Ford, and Caryn Lucas, and produced by and starring Sandra Bullock as Gracie Hart, a tomboy agent who is asked by the FBI to go undercover as a contestant when a terrorist threatens to bomb the Miss United States pageant. Michael Caine, Benjamin Bratt, Candice Bergen, William Shatner, and Ernie Hudson star in supporting roles.

Miss Congeniality was released in the United States by Warner Bros. Pictures on December 22, 2000. It received mixed reviews from critics and grossed $212 million worldwide against its $45 million budget. The film earned Bullock a nomination for a Golden Globe Award for Best Actress – Motion Picture Comedy or Musical. It was followed by the sequel Miss Congeniality 2: Armed and Fabulous in 2005.

== Plot ==
In 1982, 10-year-old Gracie Hart breaks up a fight between two boys, one of whom is a bully and the other, her crush. The boy she likes feels humiliated, as he was saved by a girl and he rudely rejects her, so she punches him and calls him a wimp.

18 years later, Gracie is a tough but uncouth special agent for the FBI. During a sting against Russian mobsters, she ignores protocol to save a mob boss who is choking, resulting in one of her fellow agents being shot. As punishment, she is demoted to a desk job.

Soon, the agency hears of a bomb threat from notorious domestic terrorist "the Citizen", regarding the upcoming Miss United States beauty pageant in San Antonio, Texas. Gracie's partner, Eric Matthews, is put in charge of the mission and relies on her ideas, only to take the credit himself.

Gracie suggests planting an agent undercover at the event, which is agreed upon. When all potential candidates are deemed unsuitable, Eric suggests that Gracie takes the role, replacing Miss New Jersey, who has been disqualified for acting in a pornographic film.

Beauty pageant coach Victor Melling teaches Gracie how to dress, walk and behave in a conventionally ladylike manner. Although initially appalled, she comes to appreciate Victor's thoroughness, and enters the pageant as "Gracie Lou Freebush", representing New Jersey. She befriends awkward and unconfident Cheryl Frasier, Miss Rhode Island. As the competition begins, she impresses the judges during the talent competition with her glass harp skills.

Several suspects are identified who could be "the Citizen", including the current competition director and former pageant winner Kathy Morningside; her assistant Frank Tobin; veteran MC Stan Fields; and even Cheryl, who has a history of involvement with an animal rights activist group.

Gracie convinces Cheryl and the other contestants to go out one night and drink, using the chance to pry into Cheryl's past. She learns however, that Kathy's past as a pageant contestant is suspicious, including the fact that the year she won, the original winner came down with food poisoning.

Gracie suspects that Kathy is a "Citizen" copycat, but when she reports this to Eric and the team, she learns that "the Citizen" has been arrested on an unrelated charge. As there is no perceived threat, their superior, Harry McDonald, pulls the mission. Gracie insists that something isn't right, but Eric and the team still leave.

Victor mentions to Eric that Frank is actually Kathy's son, a fact they had tried to hide from the FBI because of his criminal record. Eric returns to Texas to help continue the investigation, against FBI orders.

In the final round of the pageant, Gracie is stunned when she is named runner-up. Cheryl is named Miss United States, but as she goes to accept the tiara, Gracie realizes that the bomb is in the crown. She fights Cheryl for the crown as Eric wrestles with Frank, who is about to detonate the bomb. Finally, Gracie throws the tiara up at the stage scenery, where it explodes, setting the stage on fire.

As Kathy and Frank are arrested, Gracie determines that the two wanted to kill the pageant winner on stage as revenge for Kathy's own termination from the pageant organization. Afterwards, Eric asks Gracie out on a date, and they kiss. He and Victor then trick Gracie into attending the pageant's farewell breakfast, where Cheryl names her "Miss Congeniality" for saving their lives. Gracie tearfully accepts, finally understanding the true spirit of pageantry.

== Cast ==
- Sandra Bullock as FBI Special Agent Gracie Hart/Gracie Lou Freebush
  - Mary Ashleigh Green as Gracie (age 10)
- Michael Caine as Victor Melling
- Benjamin Bratt as FBI Agent Eric Matthews
- Candice Bergen as Kathy Morningside
- William Shatner as Stan Fields
- Ernie Hudson as FBI Assistant Director Harry McDonald
- John DiResta as Agent Clonsky
- Heather Burns as Cheryl Frasier (Miss Rhode Island)
- Melissa De Sousa as Karen Krantz (Miss New York)
- Steve Monroe as Frank Tobin
- Deirdre Quinn as Mary Jo Wright (Miss Texas)
- Wendy Raquel Robinson as Leslie Davis (Miss California)
- Asia De Marcos as Alana Krewson (Miss Hawaii)

== Production ==
=== Development ===
Ellen DeGeneres claims that the writer was inspired when watching her training to walk in high heels and a dress in preparation for her role co-hosting the Emmys. DeGeneres co-hosted the 46th Primetime Emmy Awards in 1994 alongside Patricia Richardson.

=== Casting ===
Eight actors read for the part of Eric Matthews, including Hugh Jackman. Matt Dillon came close to getting cast as Eric Matthews, but the part went to Benjamin Bratt.

=== Filming ===
The story is set in New York City and San Antonio. Scenes showing the exterior of the St. Regis New York, as well as a few street scenes, were shot on location in New York, and Weehawken, New Jersey. The Alamo and River Walk scenes were shot on location in San Antonio. The majority of the film was shot in Austin, Texas: scenes depicting the interior of the St. Regis were shot in Austin's Driskill Hotel; the pageant scenes were shot at the Bass Concert Hall at the University of Texas at Austin; and scenes depicting the pageant contestants in their hotel rooms were shot in the Omni Austin at South Park.

== Distribution ==
Miss Congeniality was distributed by Warner Bros. Pictures in most countries, and by Roadshow Entertainment in Australia and New Zealand.

== Reception ==
=== Box office ===
The film was the fifth-highest-grossing film in North America on its opening weekend behind Cast Away, What Women Want, The Family Man and How the Grinch Stole Christmas, making US$13.9 million. It had a 5% increase in earnings the following week—enough to make the film reach #3, only behind both Cast Away and What Women Want. By early 2001, it became Sandra Bullock's fourth film to reach $100 million domestically, after Speed, A Time to Kill and The Prince of Egypt. Overall, it was a box office hit, grossing more than $106 million in the United States, and more than $212 million worldwide.

=== Critical response ===
On Rotten Tomatoes, the film has an approval rating of 42% based on 116 reviews, with an average rating of 5.7/10. The critical consensus reads: "Though critics say Bullock is funny and charming, she can't overcome a bad script that makes the movie feel too much like a fluffy, unoriginal sitcom." On Metacritic, the film has a score of 43 out of 100, based on reviews from 20 critics, indicating "mixed or average reviews". Audiences surveyed by CinemaScore gave the film a grade of "A−".

A. O. Scott of The New York Times described it as "a standard-issue fish-out-of-water comedy" which "seems happily, deliberately second-rate, as if its ideal audience consisted of weary airline passengers". Roger Ebert for the Chicago Sun-Times wrote: "It isn't bad so much as it lacks any ambition to be more than it so obviously is" although he had some praise for Sandra Bullock's performance.

It was nominated for several awards, including two Golden Globes: Sandra Bullock for Best Performance by an Actress in a Motion Picture – Comedy/Musical, and Bosson's "One in a Million" for Best Original Song in a Motion Picture.

== Home media ==
The film's first DVD edition, released on May 1, 2001, included two audio commentaries, some deleted scenes, the theatrical trailer, and two documentaries about the making of the film. A deluxe-edition DVD, released in 2005, featured different cover art and contained the same features as the other DVD version, plus a quiz hosted by William Shatner and a sneak peek at the upcoming sequel. In 2009, a double feature edition was released that included the sequel.

== Sequel ==
A sequel, Miss Congeniality 2: Armed and Fabulous, was released on March 24, 2005. The film starred Sandra Bullock, Regina King, Enrique Murciano, William Shatner, Ernie Hudson, Heather Burns, Diedrich Bader, and Treat Williams. The sequel was less successful both critically and commercially, earning only $101.3 million. It was Bullock's second theatrically released sequel, following Speed 2: Cruise Control.

The song "Miss United States" was written by the writer Marc Lawrence's son Clyde Lawrence when he was only 5 years old.

== Soundtrack ==
Miss Congeniality: Original Motion Picture Soundtrack

Soundtrack album
- Released: December 22, 2000
- Genre: Film soundtrack
- Label: Capitol TVT Soundtrax

1. "One in a Million" - Bosson (3:30)
2. "If Everybody Looked the Same" - Groove Armada (3:40)
3. "She's a Lady (The BT Remix)" - Tom Jones (4:21)
4. "Anywhere USA" - P.Y.T. (4:06)
5. "Dancing Queen" - A-Teens (3:50)
6. "Let's Get It On" - Red Venom (3:26)
7. "Get Ya Party On" - Baha Men (3:20)
8. "None of Your Business" - Salt 'N' Pepa (3:34)
9. "Mustang Sally" - The Commitments (4:59)
10. "Bullets" - Bob Schneider (4:25)
11. "Liquored Up and Lacquered Down" - Southern Culture on the Skids (2:26)
12. "Miss United States (Berman Brothers Mix)" - William Shatner (3:38)
13. "One in a Million (Bostrom Mix)" - Bosson (3:33)
