= Hugh Grant filmography =

List of films featuring Hugh Grant

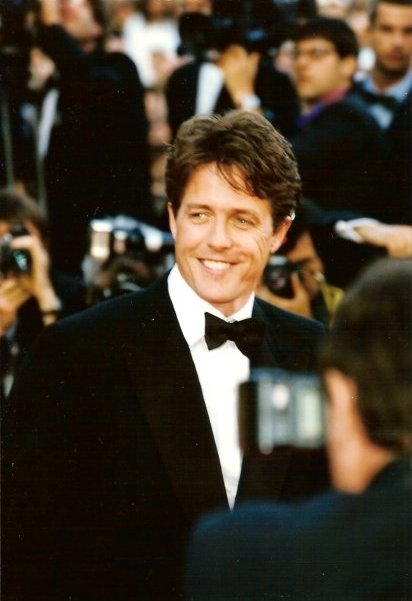
- Film: 49
- Television: 23

Hugh Grant is an English actor. His career spans four decades. He has been recognised as an international film star since 1994, and has received a Golden Globe Award and a British Academy Film Award. His films have collectively grossed more than $4.4 billion worldwide.

Grant made his film debut starring in the Oxford film, Privileged (1982), followed by a leading role in the Merchant-Ivory period romance Maurice (1987) for which he received the Venice International Film Festival's Volpi Cup for Best Actor. During this time Grant also starred in period films such as Impromptu (1991), The Remains of the Day (1993), Sense and Sensibility (1995), and Restoration (1995).

He then gained stardom as a romantic leading man starting with Four Weddings and a Funeral (1994) which earned him both the BAFTA Award for Best Actor in a Leading Role and the Golden Globe Award for Best Actor in a Motion Picture – Musical or Comedy. He often collaborated with filmmakers Richard Curtis and Marc Lawrence starring in a string of popular romantic comedy films such as Nine Months (1995), Notting Hill (1999), Bridget Jones' Diary (2001), About a Boy (2002), Two Weeks Notice (2002), Love Actually (2003), and Music and Lyrics (2007).

Grant has since had a mid-career renaissance experimenting in a variety of genres tackling against type roles ranging from comedic to dramatic. He played numerous characters in the science-fiction epic Cloud Atlas (2012), St. Clair Bayfield in the historical film Florence Foster Jenkins (2016), an egotistical actor in the children's film Paddington 2 (2017), an Oompa loompa in the family musical Wonka (2023), Thurl Ravenscroft in the Netflix comedy Unfrosted (2024), and a mysterious Englishman in the horror film Heretic (2024). During this time, he has also starred in several Guy Ritchie action films including The Man from U.N.C.L.E. (2015), The Gentlemen (2019), and Operation Fortune: Ruse de Guerre (2023).

On television, he took dramatic roles portraying British politician Jeremy Thorpe in the Amazon Prime Video anthology series A Very English Scandal (2018), and Dr. Jonathan Fraser, a husband accused of infidelity and murder in the HBO drama series The Undoing (2021), both of which earned him nominations for the Primetime Emmy Award for Outstanding Lead Actor in a Limited Series or Movie.

== Film ==
Year	Title	Role	Notes
1982	Privileged	Lord Adrian	Credited as Hughie Grant
1987	Maurice	Clive Durham	
1987	White Mischief	Hugh Cholmondeley	
1988	Rowing with the Wind	Lord Byron	Also known as Remando al viento in Spanish
1988	The Lair of the White Worm	Lord James D'Ampton	
1988	The Dawning	Harry	
1988	The Bengali Night	Allan	
1990	The Big Man	Gordon	Also known as Crossing the Line
1991	Impromptu	Frédéric Chopin	
1992	Bitter Moon	Nigel Dobson	
1993	The Remains of the Day	Reginald Cardinal	
1993	Night Train to Venice	Martin Gamil	
1994	Four Weddings and a Funeral	Charles	
1994	Sirens	Anthony Campion	
1995	Restoration	Elias Finn	
1995	Sense and Sensibility	Edward C. Ferrars	
1995	Nine Months	Samuel Faulkner	
1995	The Englishman Who Went Up a Hill But Came Down a Mountain	Reginald Anson	
1995	An Awfully Big Adventure	Meredith Potter	
1996	Extreme Measures	Dr. Guy Luthan	
1999	Mickey Blue Eyes	Michael Felgate	
1999	Notting Hill	William Thacker	
2000	Small Time Crooks	David Perrette	
2001	Bridget Jones's Diary	Daniel Cleaver	
2002	Two Weeks Notice	George Wade	
2002	About a Boy	Will Freeman	
2003	Love Actually	David, the Prime Minister	
2004	Bridget Jones: The Edge of Reason	Daniel Cleaver	
2005	Housewarming	Le nouveau voisin	Cameo
2006	American Dreamz	Martin Tweed	
2007	Music and Lyrics	Alex Fletcher	
2009	Did You Hear About the Morgans?	Paul Morgan	
2010	I'm Still Here	Himself	
2012	The Pirates! In an Adventure with Scientists!	Pirate Captain	Voice role; Also known as The Pirates! Band of Misfits
2012	Cloud Atlas	Various roles	
2014	The Rewrite	Keith Michaels	
2014	One Rogue Reporter	Himself	Documentary film
2015	The Man from U.N.C.L.E.	Alexander Waverly	
2016	Florence Foster Jenkins	St. Clair Bayfield	
2017	Paddington 2	Phoenix Buchanan	
2019	The Gentlemen	Fletcher	
2022	Glass Onion: A Knives Out Mystery	Phillip	Cameo
2023	Operation Fortune: Ruse de Guerre	Greg Simmonds	
2023	Dungeons & Dragons: Honor Among Thieves	Forge Fitzwilliam	
2023	Wonka	Lofty	
2024	Unfrosted	Thurl Ravenscroft	
2024	Heretic	Mr. Reed	
2024	Paddington in Peru	Phoenix Buchanan	Mid-credits scene cameo; credited as Phoenix Buchanan
2025	Bridget Jones: Mad About the Boy	Daniel Cleaver	

== Television ==
Year	Title	Role	Notes
1985	Honour, Profit and Pleasure	Lord Burlington	Television film
1985	Jenny's War	Peter Baines	3 episodes
1985	The Last Place on Earth	Apsley Cherry-Garrard	6 episodes
1986	Ladies in Charge	Gerald Boughton-Green	1 episode
1986	A Very Peculiar Practice	Preacher Colin	1 episode
1989	Till We Meet Again	Bruno de Lancel	2 episodes
1989	Champagne Charlie	Charles Heidsieck	Television film
1989	The Lady and the Highwayman	Lucius Vyne/Silver Blade	Television film
1991	The Trials of Oz	Richard Neville	Television film
1991	Our Sons	James Grant	Television film
1991	Performance	Alsemero/Richard Neville	2 episodes
1992	Shakespeare: The Animated Tales	Sebastian	Voice, episode
1996	The Nanny	Himself	Uncredited, 1 episode
1999	Doctor Who and the Curse of Fatal Death	The 12th Doctor	Television special
2002	Robbie the Reindeer	Blitzen	Animated television special, American dub: Episodes: "Hooves of Fire" and "Legend of the Lost Tribe"
2017	Red Nose Day Actually	David	Television short
2017	W1A	Himself	1 episode
2018	A Very English Scandal	Jeremy Thorpe	Miniseries, 3 episodes
2019	One Red Nose Day and a Wedding	Charles	Television short
2020	The Undoing	Dr. Jonathan Fraser	Miniseries, 6 episodes
2020	Death to 2020	Tennyson Foss	Netflix television special
2021	Death to 2021	Tennyson Foss	Netflix television special
2024	The Regime	Edward Keplinger	1 episode

== See also ==
- List of awards and nominations received by Hugh Grant
