= List of awards and nominations received by Hugh Grant =

Hugh Grant awards and nominations
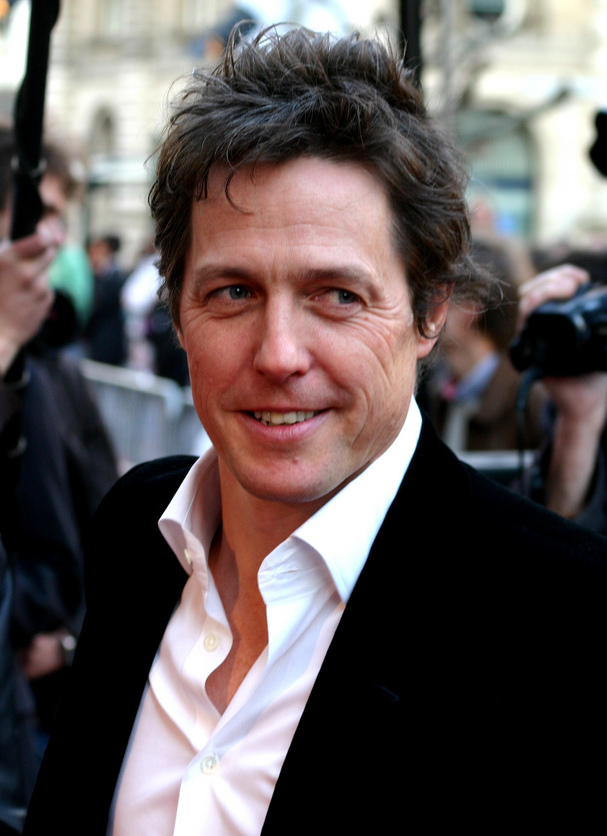
- Grant in 2008
Awards and nominations
| Award | Wins | Nominations |
| BAFTA Awards | 1 | 4 |
| Critics' Choice Awards | 2 | 9 |
| Emmy Awards | 0 | 2 |
| Golden Globe Awards | 1 | 7 |
| Screen Actors Guild Awards | 0 | 4 |

Totals (Note: Certain award groups do not simply award one winner. They acknowledge several different recipients, have runners-up, and have third place. Since this is a specific recognition and is different from losing an award, runner-up mentions are considered wins in this award tally. For simplification and to avoid errors, each award in this list has been presumed to have had a prior nomination.)
- Wins: 20
- Nominations: 79

The following is a list of awards and nominations received by Hugh Grant.

Hugh Grant is a British actor known for his comedic and dramatic roles, whose acting career has spanned over three decades. Known for giving witty and irreverent acceptance speeches, he has received a British Academy Film Award, a Golden Globe Award and a Venice International Film Festival Prize as well as nominations for two Primetime Emmy Awards and four Screen Actors Guild Awards. He has received several honorary awards including the Stanley Kubrick Britannia Award in 2003, Honorary César in 2006, and the BFI Fellowship in 2016.

Grant won the Volpi Cup for Best Actor for his early role in the Merchant Ivory film Maurice (1987). He has received the BAFTA Award for Best Actor in a Leading Role and the Golden Globe Award for Best Actor in a Motion Picture – Musical or Comedy for his breakout role in the Mike Newell directed romantic comedy Four Weddings and a Funeral (1994). He was BAFTA-nominated for his roles as St. Clair Bayfield in the Stephen Frears' directed biographical film Florence Foster Jenkins (2016), and as a vain actor in the children's comedy film Paddington 2 (2017).

For his work in television he received a British Academy Television Award nomination for Best Actor in a Leading Role for his performance as Jeremy Thorpe in the limited series A Very English Scandal (2018). He has also received six Golden Globe Awards nominations winning once, two Primetime Emmy Award nominations, and four Screen Actors Guild Award nominations. For his work on television he has received two Critics' Choice Television Award for Best Actor in a Limited Series or Television Movie nominations for A Very English Scandal (2018), and The Undoing (2020).

== Major associations ==
=== BAFTA Awards ===
| Year | Category | Nominated work | Result | Ref. |
British Academy Film Awards
| 1995 | Best Actor in a Leading Role | Four Weddings and a Funeral | Won | |
| 2017 | Best Actor in a Supporting Role | Florence Foster Jenkins | Nominated | |
| 2018 | Best Actor in a Supporting Role | Paddington 2 | Nominated | |
| 2025 | Best Actor in a Leading Role | Heretic | Nominated | |
British Academy Television Awards
| 2019 | Best Actor | A Very English Scandal | Nominated | |

=== Critics' Choice Awards ===
| Year | Category | Nominated work | Result | Ref. |
Critics' Choice Movie Awards
| 2004 | Best Acting Ensemble | Love Actually | Nominated | |
| 2017 | Best Actor in a Comedy | Florence Foster Jenkins | Nominated | |
| 2023 | Best Acting Ensemble | Glass Onion: A Knives Out Mystery | Won | |
| 2025 | Best Actor | Heretic | Nominated | |
Critics' Choice Television Awards
| 2019 | Best Actor in a Miniseries or Movie | A Very English Scandal | Nominated | |
| 2021 | Best Actor in a Miniseries or Movie | The Undoing | Nominated | |
| 2025 | Best Supporting Actor in a Miniseries or Movie | The Regime | Nominated | |
Critics' Choice Super Awards
| 2025 | Best Actor in a Horror Movie | Heretic | Nominated | |
| 2025 | Best Villain in a Movie | Heretic | Won | |

=== Emmy Awards ===
| Year | Category | Nominated work | Result | Ref. |
Primetime Emmy Awards
| 2019 | Outstanding Lead Actor in a Limited Series or Movie | A Very English Scandal | Nominated | |
| 2021 | Outstanding Lead Actor in a Limited Series or Movie | The Undoing | Nominated | |

=== Golden Globe Awards ===
| Year | Category | Nominated work | Result | Ref. |
|---|---|---|---|---|
| 1995 | Best Actor – Motion Picture Musical or Comedy | Four Weddings and a Funeral | Won | |
| 2000 | Best Actor – Motion Picture Musical or Comedy | Notting Hill | Nominated | |
| 2003 | Best Actor – Motion Picture Musical or Comedy | About a Boy | Nominated | |
| 2017 | Best Actor – Motion Picture Musical or Comedy | Florence Foster Jenkins | Nominated | |
| 2019 | Best Actor – Miniseries or Television Film | A Very English Scandal | Nominated | |
| 2021 | Best Actor – Miniseries or Television Film | The Undoing | Nominated | |
| 2025 | Best Actor – Motion Picture Musical or Comedy | Heretic | Nominated | |

=== Screen Actors Guild Awards ===
| Year | Category | Nominated work | Result | Ref. |
|---|---|---|---|---|
| 1996 | Outstanding Ensemble Cast in a Motion Picture | Sense and Sensibility | Nominated | |
| 2017 | Outstanding Actor in a Supporting Role | Florence Foster Jenkins | Nominated | |
| 2019 | Outstanding Actor in a Miniseries or Television Movie | A Very English Scandal | Nominated | |
| 2021 | Outstanding Actor in a Miniseries or Television Movie | The Undoing | Nominated | |

== Critics awards ==
| Organizations | Year | Category | Work | Result | Ref. |
|---|---|---|---|---|---|
| Alliance of Women Film Journalists | 2018 | Best Supporting Actor | Paddington 2 | Nominated | |
| Alliance of Women Film Journalists | 2025 | Best Actor | Heretic | Nominated | |
| Austin Film Critics Association | 2018 | Best Supporting Actor | Paddington 2 | Nominated | |
| Austin Film Critics Association | 2025 | Best Actor | Heretic | Nominated | |
| Awards Circuit Community | 1996 | Best Ensemble Cast | Sense and Sensibility | Nominated | |
| Chicago Film Critics Association | 1994 | Most Promising Newcomer | Four Weddings and a Funeral and Sirens | Won | |
| Chicago Film Critics Association | 2002 | Best Actor | About a Boy | Nominated | |
| Chicago Independent Film Critics Circle | 2019 | Best Supporting Actor | Paddington 2 | Nominated | |
| Chicago Independent Film Critics Circle | 2025 | Best Actor | Heretic | Nominated | |
| Dallas–Fort Worth Film Critics Association | 2024 | Best Actor | Heretic | 5th place | |
| Florida Film Critics Circle | 2018 | Best Supporting Actor | Paddington 2 | Nominated | |
| Greater Western New York Film Critics Association | 2018 | Best Supporting Actor | Paddington 2 | Nominated | |
| Greater Western New York Film Critics Association | 2025 | Best Actor | Heretic | Nominated | |
| Hawaii Film Critics Society | 2025 | Best Actor | Heretic | Nominated | |
| Hollywood Creative Alliance | 2021 | Best Actor in a Limited Series, Anthology Series, or Television Movie | The Undoing | Nominated | |
| Hollywood Creative Alliance | 2024 | Best Performance in a Horror or Thriller | Heretic | Nominated | |
| Hollywood Creative Alliance | 2025 | Best Supporting Actor in a Limited Series or TV Movie | Bridget Jones: Mad About the Boy | Nominated | |
| Houston Film Critics Society | 2025 | Best Actor | Heretic | Nominated | |
| Indiana Film Journalists Association | 2016 | Best Supporting Actor | Florence Foster Jenkins | Nominated | |
| Indiana Film Journalists Association | 2018 | Best Supporting Actor | Paddington 2 | Nominated | |
| IndieWire Critics Poll | 2018 | Best Supporting Actor | Paddington 2 | 3rd place | |
| Las Vegas Film Critics Society | 2024 | Best Actor | Heretic | Nominated | |
| London Film Critics Circle | 1994 | Special Achievement Award | Four Weddings and a Funeral | Won | |
| London Film Critics Circle | 2002 | British Actor of the Year | About a Boy | Won | |
| London Film Critics Circle | 2016 | British Actor of the Year | Florence Foster Jenkins | Nominated | |
| London Film Critics Circle | 2018 | Best Supporting Actor of the Year | Paddington 2 | Won | |
| Los Angeles Film Critics Association | 2018 | Best Supporting Actor | Paddington 2 | Runner-up | |
| Michigan Movie Critics Guild | 2024 | Best Actor | Heretic | Nominated | |
| New Mexico Film Critics | 2016 | Best Supporting Actor | Florence Foster Jenkins | Won | |
| Online Association Of Female Film Critics | 2024 | Best Male Lead | Heretic | Nominated | |
| Philadelphia Film Critics Circle | 2024 | Best Actor | Heretic | Runner-up | |
| Phoenix Film Critics Society | 2003 | Best Ensemble Acting | Love Actually | Nominated | |
| Phoenix Film Critics Society | 2016 | Best Supporting Actor | Florence Foster Jenkins | Nominated | |
| San Diego Film Critics Society | 2018 | Best Comedic Performance | Paddington 2 | Won | |
| Seattle Film Critics Society | 2018 | Best Villain | Paddington 2 | Nominated | |
| St. Louis Film Critics Association | 2024 | Best Actor | Heretic | Nominated | |
| Utah Film Critics Association | 2018 | Best Supporting Actor | Paddington 2 | Won | |
| Utah Film Critics Association | 2025 | Best Performance in a Science-Fiction, Fantasy, or Horror Film | Heretic | Nominated | |
| Washington D.C. Area Film Critics Association | 2003 | Best Ensemble | Love Actually | Won | |

== Miscellaneous awards ==
| Awards | Year | Category | Work | Result | Ref. |
|---|---|---|---|---|---|
| AACTA International Awards | 2021 | Best Actor in a Series | The Undoing | Nominated | |
| AARP Movies for Grownups Awards | 2016 | Best Grownup Love Story (shared with Meryl Streep) | Florence Foster Jenkins | Nominated | |
| AARP Movies for Grownups Awards | 2021 | Best Actor – Television | The Undoing | Nominated | |
| Behind the Voice Actors Awards | 2013 | Best Ensemble | The Pirates! In an Adventure with Scientists! | Nominated | |
| Blockbuster Entertainment Awards | 1999 | Favorite Actor – Comedy/Romance | Notting Hill | Nominated | |
| Csapnivalo Awards | 1999 | Best Actor in a Leading Role (Tied with Keanu Reeves) | Notting Hill | Won | |
| David di Donatello Awards | 1994 | Best Foreign Actor | Four Weddings and a Funeral | Nominated | |
| Dead Meat Horror Awards | 2025 | Best Lead Performer | Heretic | Nominated | |
| Dorian Awards | 2018 | TV Performance of the Year – Actor | A Very English Scandal | Nominated | |
| Empire Awards | 1999 | Best British Actor | Notting Hill | Won | |
| Empire Awards | 2001 | Best British Actor | Bridget Jones's Diary | Nominated | |
| Empire Awards | 2002 | Best British Actor | About a Boy | Won | |
| European Film Awards | 2001 | Best Actor – Audience Award | Bridget Jones's Diary | Nominated | |
| European Film Awards | 2003 | Best Actor – Audience Award | Love Actually | Nominated | |
| European Film Awards | 2016 | Best Actor | Florence Foster Jenkins | Nominated | |
| Evening Standard British Film Awards | 1994 | Peter Sellers Award for Comedy | Four Weddings and a Funeral | Won | |
| Evening Standard British Film Awards | 2001 | Peter Sellers Award for Comedy | Bridget Jones's Diary | Won | |
| Evening Standard British Film Awards | 2016 | Best Actor | Florence Foster Jenkins | Won | |
| Evening Standard British Film Awards | 2018 | Best Supporting Actor | Paddington 2 | Nominated | |
| Fangoria Chainsaw Awards | 2025 | Best Supporting Performance | Heretic | Nominated | |
| GQ Men of the Year Awards | 2002 | Film Actor in a Comedy | About a Boy | Won | |
| Golden Camera (Goldene Kamera) Awards | 2002 | Best International Actor | About a Boy | Won | |
| Hollywood Film Awards | 2016 | Best Supporting Actor | Florence Foster Jenkins | Won | |
| Kids' Choice Awards | 1999 | Favorite Movie Couple (shared with Julia Roberts) | Notting Hill | Nominated | |
| MTV Movie Awards | 1994 | Best Breakthrough Performance | Four Weddings and a Funeral | Nominated | |
| Satellite Awards | 2001 | Best Supporting Actor – Musical or Comedy | Bridget Jones's Diary | Nominated | |
| Satellite Awards | 2002 | Best Actor – Motion Picture Musical or Comedy | About a Boy | Nominated | |
| Satellite Awards | 2016 | Best Supporting Actor | Florence Foster Jenkins | Nominated | |
| Satellite Awards | 2018 | Best Actor – Miniseries or Television Film | A Very English Scandal | Nominated | |
| Satellite Awards | 2020 | Best Actor – Miniseries or Television Film | The Undoing | Nominated | |
| Satellite Awards | 2025 | Best Actor – Motion Picture Drama | Heretic | Nominated | |
| Teen Choice Awards | 2001 | Choice Movie: Chemistry (shared with Renée Zellweger) | Bridget Jones's Diary | Nominated | |
| Teen Choice Awards | 2007 | Choice Movie: Liplock (shared with Drew Barrymore) | Music and Lyrics | Nominated | |
| Venice Film Festival | 1987 | Volpi Cup for Best Actor | Maurice | Won | |

== Honorary achievements ==
| Organizations | Year | Award | Result | Ref. |
|---|---|---|---|---|
| Taormina Film Fest | 2002 | Taormina Arte Diamond Award – Cinematic Excellence | Honored | |
| VH1/Vogue Fashion Awards | 2002 | Leading Man Award | Honored | |
| BAFTA/LA Britannia Awards | 2003 | The Stanley Kubrick Britannia Award | Honored | |
| César Awards | 2006 | Honorary César | Honored | |
| British Film Institute | 2016 | BFI Fellowship | Honored | |
| Zurich Film Festival | 2016 | Golden Icon Award | Honored | |
| National Film Awards UK | 2017 | Global Contribution to Cinema | Honored | |

== Acceptance speeches ==
After the success of Four Weddings and a Funeral in 1994, Grant's wax sculpture was featured at Madame Tussauds in London. Wax figures of him are also at display in the Glamor Hall of Madame Tussauds Hong Kong, the Madame Tussauds Interactive Wax Museum in New York's Times Square, with a third one in Shanghai.

In 1995, after Grant won a Golden Globe Award, The New York Times wrote that he "made a gentle mockery of all the modest thank-you speeches at such events" and "brought down the house." With mock gratitude, Grant said: "It's tragic how much I'm enjoying getting this. It's heaven. Right up my alley. I can't tell the Foreign Press Association how much I admire them." Referring to his agent in London, who got him the role in Four Weddings and a Funeral, he deadpanned: "He's extremely small and extremely vicious."

Grant was awarded Star of the Year Award at the ShowEast Convention on 11 October 2002. Presenting the award, Sandra Bullock revealed that "on a set of hundreds of people, he knew everybody's name." Dan Fellman, Warner Bros.' president of distribution, said, "It's a great honor to have the industry pay tribute to Hugh Grant for the sheer enjoyment and delight he has brought to moviegoers worldwide during his most extraordinary career."

In 2002, Grant was declared one of the GQ Men of the Year. He was featured on the magazine's November cover with Denzel Washington and Ralph Lauren. Grant was honoured as Man of the Year in comedy for his performance in About a Boy, according to the magazine, because, "In the hands of a lesser actor, the redemption of said cad—an indolent snake who preys on single mothers—would have been a mechanical affair. Instead, About a Boy was the year's great surprise, due in part to Hugh Grant's performance—probably the finest of his career."

Sandra Bullock was once again chosen to present Grant with the prestigious Stanley Kubrick Britannia Award for Excellence in Film. The honour was bestowed on 8 November 2003 by BAFTA/LA. Grant received the award saying that it was "very very nice and unusual for me, I don't really get many prizes and when I do I'm cockahoop." BAFTA/LA chairman, Gary Dartnall, said Grant was chosen because, "His talent and keen intelligence have distinguished him as one of the best and brightest in contemporary cinema."

In 2005, Grant became one of the first 100 stars honoured at the Avenue of Stars in central London. His name is represented by a silver star set into the pavement outside St Paul's Church, known as the Actors' church, in Covent Garden Piazza.

Awards
| Preceded by Robin Williams for Mrs. Doubtfire | Golden Globe Award for Best Actor - Motion Picture Musical or Comedy; 1995 for Four Weddings and a Funeral | Succeeded by John Travolta for Get Shorty |
| Preceded by Anthony Hopkins for Shadowlands | BAFTA Award for Best Actor in a Leading Role; 1994 for Four Weddings and a Funeral | Succeeded by Nigel Hawthorne for The Madness of King George |
