= Hugh Grant =

English actor (born 1960)

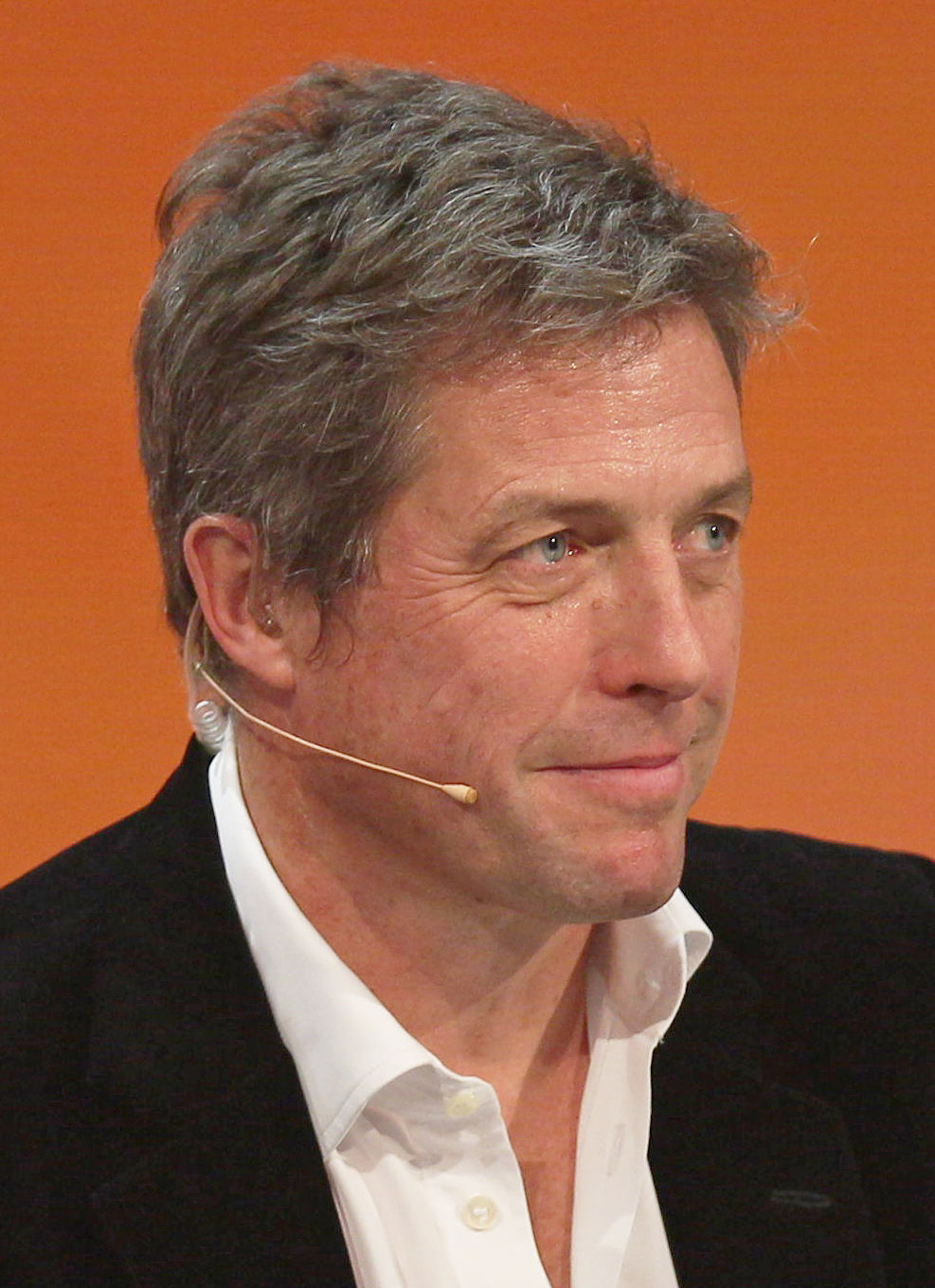
- Grant in 2014
- Born: Hugh John Mungo Grant; 9 September 1960 (age 66); Hammersmith, London, England
- Education: University of Oxford (MA)
- Occupation: Actor
- Years active: 1982–present
- Works: Full list
- Spouse: Anna Elisabet Eberstein (m. 2018)
- Partners: Elizabeth Hurley (1987–2000)
- Children: 5
- Relatives: Rick Cosnett (third cousin)

Hugh John Mungo Grant (born 9 September 1960) is an English actor. He established himself early in his career as a charming and vulnerable romantic leading man, and has since transitioned into a character actor. His accolades include a British Academy Film Award and a Golden Globe Award as well as nominations for two Primetime Emmy Awards. He received an Honorary César in 2006. In 2022, Time Out magazine listed Grant as one of Britain's 50 greatest actors of all time. As of 2025, his films have grossed over US$4 billion worldwide.

Grant made his feature film acting debut in Privileged (1982), followed by the romantic drama Maurice (1987) for which he gained acclaim as well as the Volpi Cup for Best Actor. He then acted in a string of successful period dramas such as The Remains of the Day (1993), Sense and Sensibility (1995) and Restoration (1995). Grant emerged as a star with Richard Curtis's romantic comedy Four Weddings and a Funeral (1994), for which he won the Golden Globe and BAFTA Award for Best Actor. He starred in further romantic comedies such as Notting Hill (1999), Bridget Jones's Diary (2001) and its 2004 and 2025 sequels, About a Boy (2002), Two Weeks Notice (2002), Love Actually (2003) and Music and Lyrics (2007).

Grant began to take against-type parts earning three BAFTA Award nominations for his roles as St. Clair Bayfield in the biopic comedy Florence Foster Jenkins (2016), a haughty actor in the family film Paddington 2 (2017), and a charming yet sinister man in the horror film Heretic (2024). He has also acted in the science fiction epic Cloud Atlas (2012), the crime comedy The Gentlemen (2019), the fantasy comedy Dungeons & Dragons: Honor Among Thieves (2023), and the musical fantasy Wonka (2023). He earned two Primetime Emmy Award nominations for his roles as Jeremy Thorpe in the BBC miniseries A Very English Scandal (2018) and a man accused of murder in the HBO miniseries The Undoing (2020).

Grant has been outspoken about his antipathy towards the profession of acting, his disdain towards the culture of celebrity, and his hostility towards the media. He emerged as a prominent critic of the conduct of Rupert Murdoch's News Corporation during the News International phone hacking scandal.

== Early life and education ==
Grant was born on 9 September 1960 in Hammersmith Hospital, the second son of Fynvola Susan MacLean (1933–2001) and Captain James Murray Grant (born 1929). His grandfather, Colonel James Murray Grant, DSO, was decorated for bravery and leadership at Saint-Valery-en-Caux during World War II. Genealogist Anthony Adolph has described Grant's family history as "a colourful Anglo-Scottish tapestry of warriors, empire-builders, and aristocracy." His family tree includes Sir Walter Raleigh; William Drummond, 4th Viscount Strathallan; James Stewart; John Murray, 1st Marquess of Atholl; Heneage Finch, 1st Earl of Nottingham; Sir Evan Nepean; and a sister of Prime Minister Spencer Perceval.

Grant's father was an officer in the Seaforth Highlanders for eight years in Malaya and Germany. He ran a carpet business and pursued hobbies such as golf and watercolour painting; he raised his family in Chiswick, west London, where the Grants lived next to Arlington Park Mansions on Sutton Lane. In September 2006, a collection of Capt. Grant's paintings was hosted by The John Martin Gallery in a charity exhibition, organised by his son, called "James Grant: 30 Years of Watercolours". Hugh's mother worked as a schoolteacher and taught Latin, French and music for more than 30 years in the state schools of west London. She died at 67 of pancreatic cancer.

On Inside the Actors Studio in 2002, Grant credited his mother with "any acting genes that [he] might have." Both his parents were children of military families, but despite that background, he has said, his family was not always affluent as he grew up. He spent many of his childhood summers hunting and fishing with his grandfather in Scotland. Grant has an older brother, James "Jamie" Grant, a New York-based investment banker.

Grant started his education at Hogarth Primary School in Chiswick, then moved to St Peter's Primary School in Hammersmith, followed by Wetherby School, a private preparatory school in Notting Hill. From 1969 to 1978, he attended Latymer Upper School in Hammersmith, at the time a direct grant grammar school. He was educated on a scholarship and played 1st XV rugby, cricket, and football. He also represented Latymer Upper on the quiz show Top of the Form, an academic competition between two teams of four secondary school students each.

In 1979, he won a Galsworthy scholarship to study at the University of Oxford as a student of New College, Oxford, where he read English literature and graduated with an upper second class degree. Then viewing acting as nothing more than a creative outlet, he joined the Oxford University Dramatic Society and played Fabian in a production of Twelfth Night. He also starred in his first film, Privileged (1982), produced by the Oxford University Film Foundation. He turned down an offer from the Courtauld Institute of Art, University of London, to pursue a PhD in art history because he failed to secure a grant.

== Career ==
=== 1982–1986: Early roles and breakthrough ===
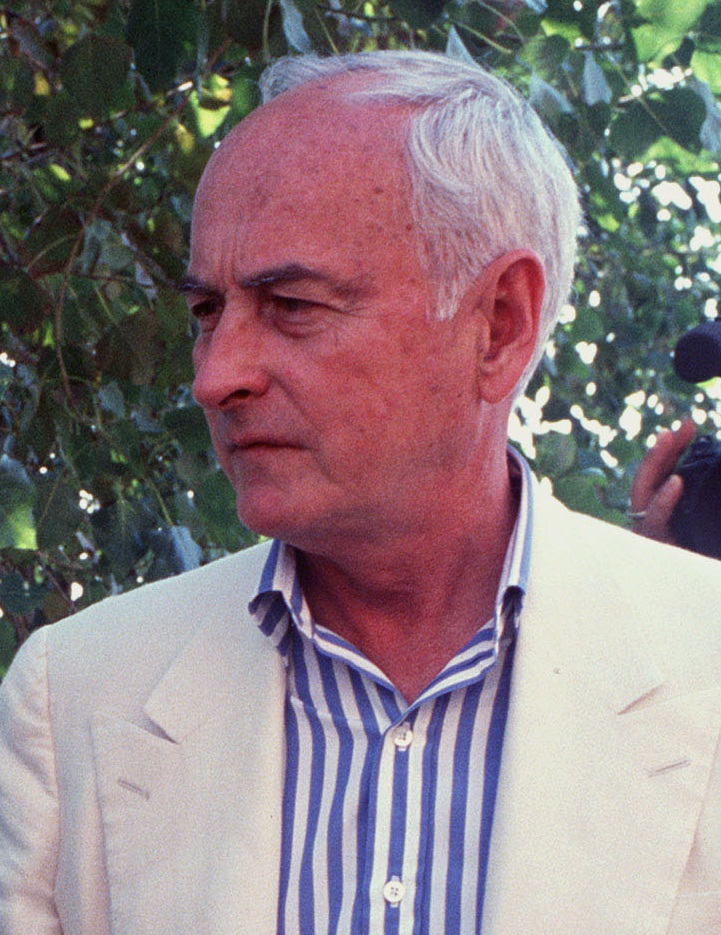
Grant gained acclaim for his role in the James Ivory directed film Maurice (1987).

After making his debut in the Oxford-financed film Privileged (1982), Grant dabbled in a variety of jobs, such as working as an assistant groundsman at Fulham stadium Craven Cottage, tutoring, writing comedy sketches for TV shows and working for Talkback Productions to write and produce radio commercials for products such as Mighty White bread and Red Stripe lager. At a screening of Privileged at BAFTA in London, he was approached by a talent agent offering to represent him. Still intending to begin his MPhil at the Courtauld Institute, Grant declined, but then later reconsidered, thinking that acting for a year would be a good way to save some money for his studies. Soon afterwards he was offered a supporting role in The Bounty (1984) starring Mel Gibson and Anthony Hopkins, but was prevented from playing the role because he did not yet have an Equity card, which could only be earned through acting in regional theatre. To obtain his Equity card, he joined the Nottingham Playhouse and lived for a year at Park Terrace in The Park Estate in Nottingham. Richard Digby Day directed him in small roles at the Nottingham Playhouse in Lady Windermere's Fan, an avant-garde production of Hamlet, and Coriolanus.

Bored with small acting parts, Grant created a sketch-comedy group called The Jockeys of Norfolk, a name taken from Shakespeare's Richard III, with friends Chris Lang and Andy Taylor. The group toured London's pub comedy circuit with stops at The George IV in Chiswick, Canal Cafe Theatre in Little Venice and The King's Head in Islington. The Jockeys of Norfolk proved a hit at the 1985 Edinburgh Festival Fringe after their sketch on the Nativity, told as an Ealing comedy, gained them a spot on Russell Harty's BBC2 TV show Harty Goes to .... In 1986 he played Eric Birling in a production of An Inspector Calls at the Royal Exchange Theatre in Manchester, directed by Richard Wilson, giving a performance that Grevel Lindop, writing in the Times Literary Supplement, described as "outstanding". In 1985 and 1986, Grant had minor roles in eight television productions, including TV films, historical miniseries and single episodes of series. His first leading film role came in Merchant-Ivory's Edwardian drama film Maurice (1987), adapted from E. M. Forster's novel. He and co-star James Wilby shared the Volpi Cup for Best Actor at the Venice Film Festival for their portrayals of lovers Clive Durham and Maurice Hall, respectively.

During the late 1980s and early 1990s, he balanced small roles on television with film work, which included playing Hugh Cholmondeley, 3rd Baron Delamere in the BAFTA Award-nominated White Mischief (1987) and a supporting role in The Dawning (1988) opposite Anthony Hopkins and Jean Simmons. In 1988 he had a leading role in Ken Russell's horror film, The Lair of the White Worm. He was Lord Byron in a Goya Award-winning Spanish production called Remando al viento (1988) and portrayed legendary champagne merchant Charles Heidsieck in the television film Champagne Charlie (1989). In 1990 he had a small role in the sport/crime drama The Big Man, opposite Liam Neeson, in which Grant assumed a Scottish accent; the film explores the life of a Scottish miner (Neeson) who becomes unemployed during a union strike. In 1991 he played Julie Andrews' gay son in the ABC made-for-television film Our Sons.

In 1991 he also starred as Frederic Chopin in Impromptu, opposite Judy Davis as his lover George Sand. In 1992 he appeared in Roman Polanski's film Bitter Moon, portraying a fastidious and proper British tourist who is married but finds himself enticed by the sexual hedonism of a seductive French woman and her embittered, paraplegic American husband. The film was called an "anti-romantic opus of sexual obsession and cruelty" by The Washington Post. In 1993 he had a supporting role in the Merchant-Ivory drama The Remains of the Day. Grant later jokingly called many of the productions of his early career "Europuddings, where you would have a French script, a Spanish director and English actors. The script would usually be written by a foreigner, badly translated into English. And then they'd get English actors in, because they thought that was the way to sell it to America."

=== 1994–1999: Four Weddings and a Funeral and stardom ===
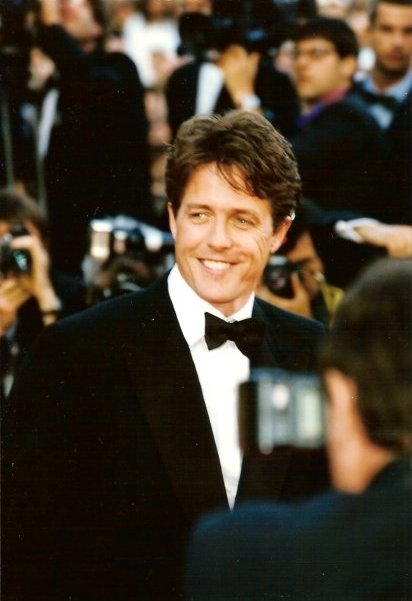
Grant at the 1997 Cannes Film Festival

At 32, Grant claimed to be on the brink of giving up the acting profession but was surprised by the script of Four Weddings and a Funeral (1994). "If you read as many bad scripts as I did, you'd know how grateful you are when you come across one where the guy actually is funny," he later recalled. Released in 1994 with Grant as the protagonist, Four Weddings and a Funeral became the highest-grossing British film to date with a worldwide box office in excess of $244 million, making him an overnight international star. His entry in The Trouble with Men: Masculinities in European and Hollywood Cinema states "Four Weddings made him a truly international star whose image was endlessly promoted in tabloid newspaper articles, television chat shows and magazine profiles, especially in mass circulation women's magazines. Grant was careful to play up to the affable and self-deprecating English gent. His interviewers commented frequently on his romantic attractiveness, a modern matinée idol, blue eyed, very good looking in a classically English way, with his floppy hair and charming smile, his impeccable manners leavened by the occasional expletive".

The film was nominated for two Academy Awards and, among numerous awards won by its cast and crew, it earned Grant a Golden Globe Award for Best Actor - Motion Picture Musical or Comedy and a BAFTA Award for Best Actor in a Leading Role. It also temporarily typecast him as the lead character, Charles, a bohemian and debonair bachelor. Grant saw it as an inside joke that the star, due to the parts he played, was assumed to have the personality of the screenwriter (Richard Curtis), who is known for writing about himself and his own life. Grant later expressed "Although I owe whatever success I've had to Four Weddings and a Funeral, it did become frustrating after a bit that people made two assumptions: One was that I was that character – when in fact nothing could be further from the truth, as I'm sure Richard would tell you – and the other frustrating thing was that they thought that's all I could do. I suppose, because those films happened to be successful, no one, perhaps understandably, ... bothered to rent all the other films I'd done".

In July 1994, he signed a two-year production deal with Castle Rock Entertainment and, by October, he became founder and director of the UK-based Simian Films Limited. He appointed his then-girlfriend, Elizabeth Hurley, as the head of development to look for prospective projects. Simian Films produced two Grant vehicles in the 1990s and lost a bid to produce About a Boy to Robert De Niro's TriBeCa Productions. The company closed its US office in 2002 and Grant resigned as director in December 2005. Before the release of Four Weddings and a Funeral, Grant had reunited with its director Mike Newell for the tragicomedy An Awfully Big Adventure (1995), which was labelled a "determinedly off-beat film" by The New York Times. He portrayed the supercilious director of a repertory company in post-World War II Liverpool. Critic Roger Ebert wrote, "It shows that he has range as an actor" but the San Francisco Chronicle disapproved on grounds that the film "plays like a vanity production for Grant". Janet Maslin, praising Grant as "superb" and "a dashing cad under any circumstances", commented, "For him this film represents the road not taken. Made before Four Weddings and a Funeral was released, it captures Mr. Grant as the clever, versatile character actor he was then becoming, rather than the international dreamboat he is today." His next role was as a cartographer in 1917 Wales in The Englishman Who Went Up a Hill But Came Down a Mountain (1995).

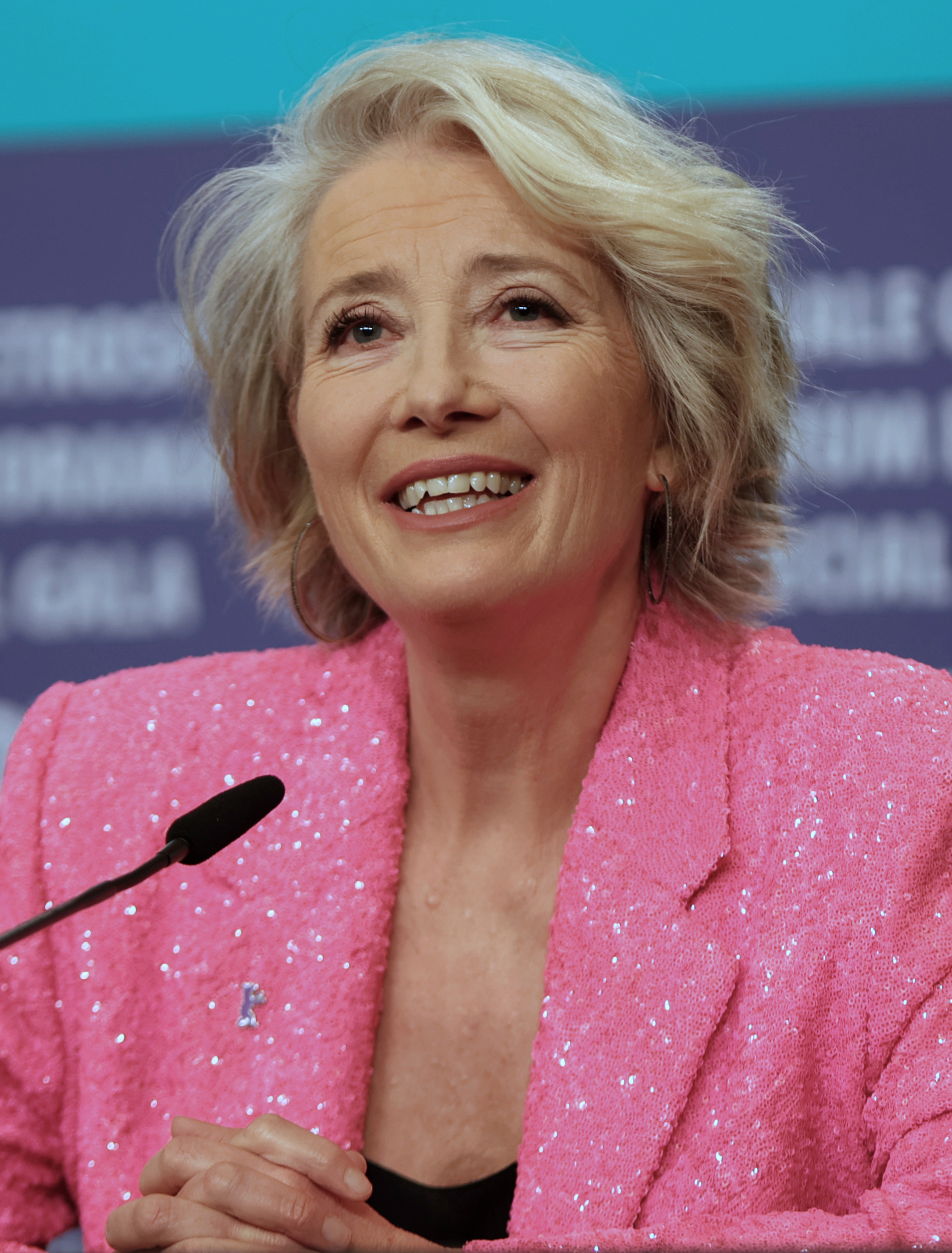
Grant portrayed Edward Ferrars opposite Emma Thompson in Sense and Sensibility (1995).

Grant's first studio-financed Hollywood project was opposite Julianne Moore in Chris Columbus's comedy Nine Months (1995). Though a hit at the box office, it was almost universally panned by critics. The Washington Post called it a "grotesquely pandering caper" and singled out Grant's performance, as a child psychiatrist reacting unfavourably to his girlfriend's unexpected pregnancy, for his "insufferable muggings". Grant himself has been highly critical of his performance in Nine Months, stating in a 2016 interview that "I really ruined it. And it was entirely my fault. I panicked, it was such a big jump up from what I'd been paid before to what they were offering me. And the scale was inhuman to my standards, you know the scale of the production, 20th Century Fox, the whole thing. And I just tried much too hard, and you know I forgot to do basic acting things, like mean it. So I pulled faces and overacted, it was a shocker". Next in 1995, he starred as Emma Thompson's suitor in her Academy Award-winning adaptation of Jane Austen's Sense and Sensibility, directed by Ang Lee. In 1995 he also performed in Restoration; Lisa Schwarzbaum wrote that Grant is "having a fine and liberating time playing a supercilious court portrait painter", and Kevin Thomas of Los Angeles Times said he has "some delicious moments" in the film. He made his debut as a film producer with the 1996 thriller Extreme Measures. Roger Ebert and Gene Siskel each gave the film three out of four stars, with Siskel writing "Hugh Grant's work in Extreme Measures is a refreshing standout."

After a three-year hiatus, in 1999 he paired with Julia Roberts in Notting Hill, which was written by Richard Curtis and produced by much of the same team that was responsible for Four Weddings and a Funeral. This new Working Title production displaced Four Weddings and a Funeral as the biggest British hit in the history of cinema, with earnings equalling $363 million worldwide. As it became exemplary of modern romantic comedies in mainstream culture, the film was also received well by critics. CNN reviewer Paul Clinton said, "Notting Hill stands alone as another funny and heartwarming story about love against all odds." Reactions to his Golden Globe-nominated performance were varied, with Salon.com's Stephanie Zacharek criticising that, "Grant's performance stands as an emblem of what's wrong with Notting Hill. What's maddening about Grant is that he just never cuts the crap. He's become one of those actors who's all shambling self-caricature, from his twinkly crow's feet to the time-lapsed half century it takes him to actually get one of his lines out." The film provided both its stars a chance to satirise the woes of international notoriety, most noted of which was Grant's turn as a faux-journalist who sits through a dull press junket with what The New York Times called "a delightfully funny deadpan".

Grant also released his second production output, a fish-out-of-water mob comedy Mickey Blue Eyes, that year. It was dismissed by critics, performed modestly at the box office and garnered its actor-producer mixed reviews for his starring role. Roger Ebert thought, "Hugh Grant is wrong for the role [and] strikes one wrong note and then another", whereas Kenneth Turan, writing in the Los Angeles Times, said, "If he'd been on the Titanic, fewer lives would have been lost. If he'd accompanied Robert Scott to the South Pole, the explorer would have lived to be 100. That's how good Hugh Grant is at rescuing doomed ventures."

=== 2000–2009: Continued romantic comedy roles ===
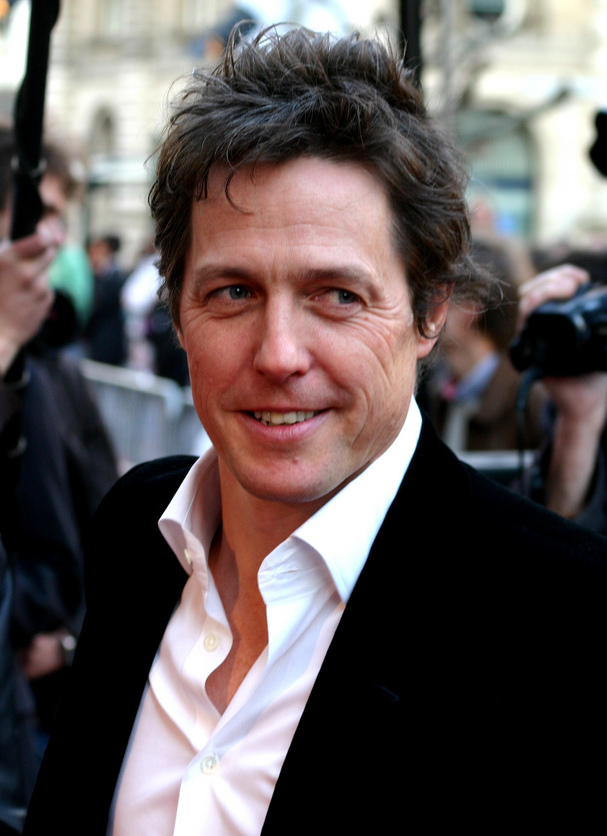
Grant in Brussels, October 2008

While promoting Woody Allen's Small Time Crooks (2000) on NBC's The Today Show in 2000, Grant told host Matt Lauer, "It's my millennium of bastards". Small Time Crooks starred Grant, in the words of film critic Andrew Sarris, as "a petty, petulant, faux-Pygmalion art dealer, David, [who] is one of the sleaziest and most unsympathetic characters Mr. Allen has ever created". In a role devoid of his comic attributes, The New York Times wrote: "Mr. Grant deftly imbues his character with exactly a perfect blend of charm and nasty calculation." In 2000, Grant also joined the supervisory board of IM Internationalmedia AG, the powerful Munich-based film and media company. In 2001, his turn as a charming but womanising book publisher, Daniel Cleaver, in Bridget Jones's Diary was proclaimed by Variety to be "as sly an overthrow of a star's polished posh – and nice – poster image as any comic turn in memory". The film, adapted from Helen Fielding's novel of the same name, was an international hit, earning $281 million worldwide. He was, according to The Washington Post, fitting as "a cruel, manipulative cad, hiding behind the male god's countenance that he knows all too well".

In 2002, Grant starred as the trust-funded womaniser Will Freeman in the film adaptation of Nick Hornby's best-selling novel About a Boy. The BBC thought Grant delivered an "immaculate comic performance", and with an Academy Award-nominated screenplay, About a Boy was determined by The Washington Post to be "that rare romantic comedy that dares to choose messiness over closure, prickly independence over fetishised coupledom, and honesty over typical Hollywood endings". Rolling Stone wrote, "The acid comedy of Grant's performance carries the film [and he] gives this pleasing heartbreaker the touch of gravity it needs", while Roger Ebert observed that "the Cary Grant department is understaffed, and Hugh Grant shows here that he is more than a star, he is a resource". Released a day after the blockbuster Star Wars: Episode II – Attack of the Clones, About a Boy was a more modest box office grosser than other successful Grant films, making all of $129 million globally. The film earned Grant his third Golden-Globe nomination, while the London Film Critics Circle named Grant its Best British Actor and GQ honoured him as one of the magazine's men of the year 2002. "His performance can only be described as revelatory", wrote critic Ann Hornaday, adding that "Grant lends the shoals layer upon layer of desire, terror, ambivalence and self-awareness." The New York Observer concluded: "[The film] gets most of its laughs from the evolved expertise of Hugh Grant in playing characters that audiences enjoy seeing taken down a peg or two as a punishment for philandering and womanising and simply being too handsome for words-and with an English accent besides. In the end, the film comes over as a messy delight, thanks to the skill, generosity and good-sport, punching-bag panache of Mr. Grant's performance."

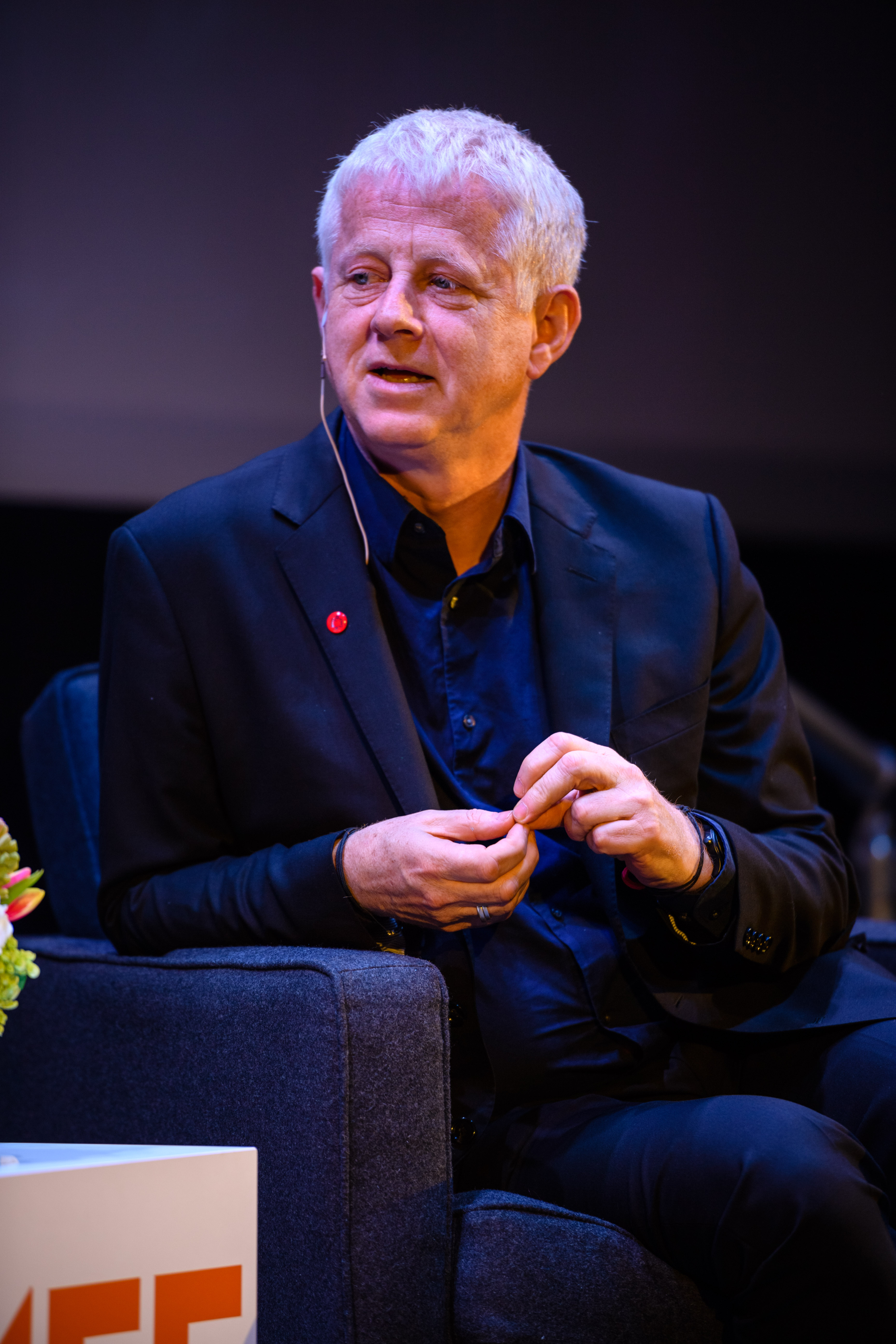
Grant has starred in numerous Richard Curtis films including Love Actually (2003).

About a Boy also marked a notable change in his boyish look. Now 41, he had lost weight and also abandoned his trademark floppy hair. Entertainment Weekly's Owen Gleiberman took note of Grant's maturation in his review, saying he looked noticeably older and that it "looked good on him". He added that Grant's "pillowy cheeks are flatter and a bit drawn, and the eyes that used to peer with 'love me' cuteness now betray a shark's casual cunning. Everything about him is leaner and spikier (including his hair, which has been shorn and moussed into a Eurochic bed-head mess), but it's not just his surface that's more virile; the nervousness is gone, too. Hugh Grant has grown up, holding on to his lightness and witty cynicism but losing the stuttering sherry-club mannerisms that were once his signature. In doing so, he has blossomed into the rare actor who can play a silver-tongued sleaze with a hidden inner decency."

He was paired with Sandra Bullock in Warner Bros.'s Two Weeks Notice (2002), which made $199 million internationally but received poor reviews. The Village Voice concluded that Grant's creation of a spoiled billionaire fronting a real estate business was "little more than a Britishism machine". Two Weeks Notice was followed by the 2003 ensemble comedy, Love Actually, headlined by Grant as the British Prime Minister. A Christmas release by Working Title Films, the film was promoted as "the ultimate romantic comedy" and accumulated $246 million at the international box office. It marked the directorial debut of Richard Curtis, who told The New York Times that Grant adamantly tempered the characterisation of the role to make his character more authoritative and less haplessly charming than earlier Curtis incarnations. Roger Ebert claimed that "Grant has flowered into an absolutely splendid romantic comedian" and has "so much self-confidence that he plays the British prime minister as if he took the role to be a good sport". Film critic Rex Reed, on the contrary, called his performance "an oversexed bachelor spin on Tony Blair" as the star "flirted with himself in the paroxysm of self-love that has become his acting style".

In 2004, he reprised his role as Daniel Cleaver for a small part in Bridget Jones: The Edge of Reason, which, like its predecessor, made more than $262 million commercially. Gone from the screen for two years, Grant next re-teamed with Paul Weitz (About a Boy) for the black comedy American Dreamz (2006). Grant starred as the acerbic host of an American Idol-like reality show where, according to Caryn James of The New York Times, "nothing is real ... except the black hole at the centre of the host's heart, as Mr. Grant takes Mr. Cowell's villainous act to its limit". American Dreamz failed financially but Grant was generously praised. He played his self-aggrandising character, an amalgam of Simon Cowell and Ryan Seacrest, with smarmy self-loathing. The Boston Globe proposed that this "just may be the great comic role that has always eluded Hugh Grant", and critic Carina Chocano said, "He is twice as enjoyable as the preening bad guy as he was as the bumbling good guy."

In 2007, he starred opposite Drew Barrymore in a parody of pop culture and the music industry called Music and Lyrics. The Associated Press described it as "a weird little hybrid of a romantic comedy that's simultaneously too fluffy and not whimsical enough". Though he neither listens to music nor owns any CDs, Grant learned to sing, play the piano, dance (a few mannered steps) and studied the mannerisms of prominent musicians to prepare for his role as a has-been pop singer, based loosely on Andrew Ridgeley, member of 1980s pop duo Wham!. The film, with its revenues totalling $145 million, allowed him to mock disposable pop stardom and fleeting celebrity through its washed-up lead character. According to the San Francisco Chronicle, "Grant strikes precisely the right note with regard to Alex's career: He's too intelligent not to be a little embarrassed, but he's far too brazen to feel anything like shame." In 2009, he starred opposite Sarah Jessica Parker in Marc Lawrence's romantic comedy Did You Hear About the Morgans?, which was a critical failure and box office disappointment.

=== 2012–2017: Mid-career experimentation ===
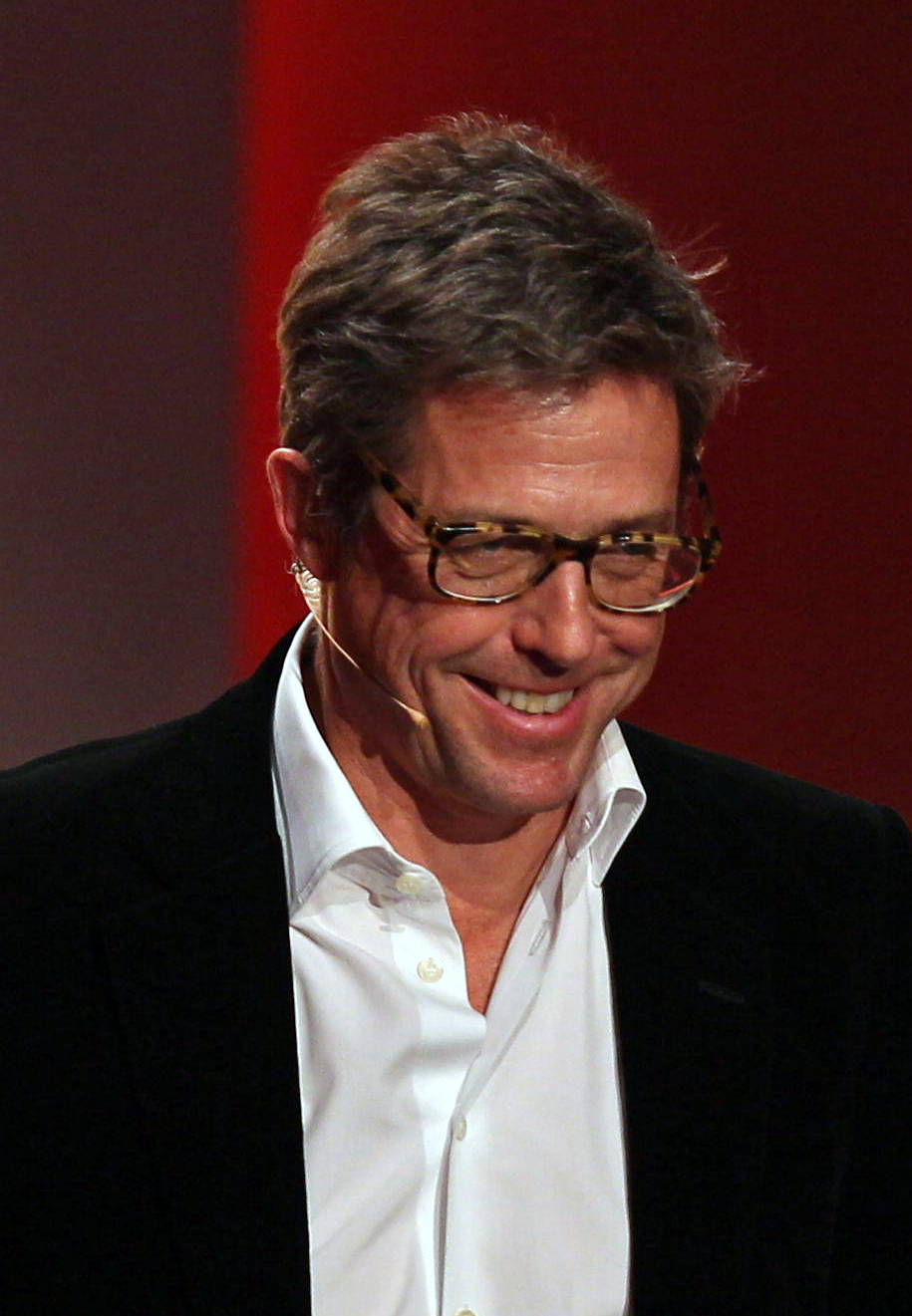
Grant in 2014

Grant was featured in the Wachowskis' and Tom Tykwer's epic science fiction film Cloud Atlas in 2012, playing six different dark characters. In the same year, Grant lent his voice to the Aardman stop motion animation The Pirates! Band of Misfits. He reunited with Lawrence again for a dramedy film The Rewrite (2014), starring opposite Marisa Tomei. The film received mixed-to-positive reviews, while Grant's performance was praised by many critics; director Quentin Tarantino has stated that the film is one of his favourites of the year and called Grant a "perfect leading man".

In 2015, he had a supporting role as Alexander Waverly in Guy Ritchie's crime thriller The Man from U.N.C.L.E.; Entertainment Weekly described his performance as "the only bit of fun" in the film, and Glenn Kenny of Rogerebert.com gave the film a mixed review but stated that "while it can't be said that Hugh Grant saves the movie, his return to prominence in the last half-hour, after a plot-seeding-walk-on earlier in the movie, peps things up considerably".

In 2016, Grant played St. Clair Bayfield, partner of the title character, in the film Florence Foster Jenkins, directed by Stephen Frears and starring Meryl Streep. His performance drew raves from film critics as "career-best" (Screen International), "one of his best performances in years" (Indiewire), "best work of his career" (Variety) where he "goes deeper, darker and riskier" (Rolling Stone). Rafer Guzman of Newsday said "Surely the 55-year-old actor has just sealed his first-ever Oscar nomination." Carrie Rickey of Yahoo! Movies commented that Grant "deserves the Globe, an Oscar nomination, and the recognition — finally — that he is unique and irreplaceable among modern actors". He was nominated for his first individual Screen Actors Guild Award and also earned nominations for a BAFTA, a Golden Globe, a Critics' Choice Award, a Satellite Award and a European Film Award. Several critics put his work among the best acting performances of the year. Most award pundits predicted Grant would receive his first Academy Award nomination for his performance, but he was not nominated.

His next appearance was as Phoenix Buchanan, the main antagonist of Paddington 2, which was a commercial and critical success. The Guardian described his performance as "scene-stealing", while IGN commented "Grant continues to make an astonishing comeback in his career, once again by playing into his expert comedic abilities as Phoenix Buchanan, who dons each of his ridiculous disguises with a kind of egotistical obliviousness that Grant is perfect at pulling off." Grant went on to win London Film Critics' Circle Award for Supporting Actor of the Year and was nominated for a BAFTA Award for Best Actor in a Supporting Role for his performance. Grant's performance was ranked as the 22nd greatest movie performance of the decade by IndieWire in 2019.

=== 2018–present: Mature career renaissance ===
In 2018, Grant returned to television screens after 25 years, as Jeremy Thorpe opposite Ben Whishaw as Norman Josiffe in the BBC One miniseries A Very English Scandal, which marked his second collaboration with director Stephen Frears. The miniseries, and in particular Grant, were widely and highly praised. Digital Spy's review stated that "There's always been a bit of the devil in Grant's best turns, and in Thorpe, a man with a fully-realised dark side, he's found his richest part in years". The New Statesman wrote, "Hugh Grant is Thorpe, and everything about his performance is exactly so. It's the role of Grant's life, and he performs it even more brilliantly than he did Phoenix Buchanan in Paddington 2." The Sunday Times stated, "It's become tediously predictable to praise this drama but, as Thorpe, Hugh Grant really has proved he's getting better as he's getting older". Grant was nominated for several awards, including the Primetime Emmy Award, Screen Actors Guild Award, Golden Globe Award, BAFTA Award for Best Actor in a Limited Series or Movie.

In 2019, Grant played another against-type role, in Guy Ritchie's The Gentlemen, his second collaboration with the director following The Man From U.N.C.L.E. Grant plays Fletcher, a seedy and unscrupulous private investigator, which he called "a fun bit of casting" referring to his Hacked Off campaigning. He has stated he based his character on tabloid reporters who "used to be my enemies and now they're my friends". Even though the film received mostly mixed reviews, Grant's performance was praised. Stephen Dalton of The Hollywood Reporter called Grant "a beating comic heart" of the film, adding that "he weighs up every wry line with relish, and Ritchie makes strong use of his deadpan comic talents." Joe Morgenstern of Wall Street Journal also highly praised his work, writing, "[I]n a word, Mr. Grant is sensational. In two more words, he's absolutely hilarious; it's some of the best work he's done on screen."

In 2020, Grant starred in HBO miniseries The Undoing, opposite Nicole Kidman and Donald Sutherland. The miniseries was premiered on 25 October 2020 to mixed reviews, though Grant's performance was widely acclaimed. Film critic Caryn James said Grant has the "richest part" and added, "He sharply defines Jonathan as a slippery character, and walks the line expertly to keep us off guard. How much should we trust Jonathan? When he starts confessing some secrets, is all or any of it true? With this role and that in the recent A Very English Scandal, Grant has become expert at bringing his charm to darker characters." Brian Tallerico of RogerEbert.com was less impressed with the series but called Grant's performance as the "series-best". Grant received a Screen Actors Guild Award, Golden Globe Award and Critics' Choice Television Award nomination for his performance.

In 2023, Grant reunited with Guy Ritchie for the action Operation Fortune: Ruse de Guerre alongside Jason Statham and Aubrey Plaza. The movie was originally planned to be released on early 2022 but had several delays. While the film was a box office flop with mixed reviews, Grant's performance still received mostly positive response. The A.V. Club said Grant "delivers a fantastic character performance" and "is so committed that he throws off the balance of the ensemble because no one else is as good as he is". He next appeared as an ambitious rogue and con artist Forge in the fantasy adventure film Dungeons & Dragons: Honor Among Thieves. Jonah Nink of Chicago Reader praised his performance by saying "None of the cast holds a fireball to Hugh Grant, however, who owns every second of his goofball performance as one of the film's villains."

Also in 2023, Grant appeared as an Oompa-Loompa in Wonka, a film which serves as a prequel to the Roald Dahl novel Charlie and the Chocolate Factory, exploring Willy Wonka's origins. In selecting Grant for the role, Wonka director Paul King told Empire magazine, "Going back to the book, and reading all those poems, and hearing [the Oompa Loompas'] voice as a very sort of cynical, sarcastic, cruel, funny, but wicked voice, I went, 'Oh... That's sort of a bit like Hugh!'" Despite initial backlash from the dwarfism community over his casting, Grant ultimately received praise for his performance, with Nick Levine of NME writing "A scene-stealing Grant provides the comic highlights as Lofty, a supercilious Oompa Loompa with a grudge against Chalamet's title character, Willy Wonka." In 2024, Grant had a guest appearance in Stephen Frears-directed, Kate Winslet-starring HBO limited series The Regime, for which he was nominated for Critics' Choice Television Award for Best Supporting Actor. The same year he played a fictional version of Thurl Ravenscroft who voiced Tony the Tiger in the Jerry Seinfeld comedy film Unfrosted. Grant's performance was praised with Matt Schimkowitz of The A.V. Club describing him as the film's "MVP" and William Bibbiani of TheWrap writing that he "has the film's only consistently funny subplot".

Grant next starred in the A24 horror film Heretic (2024). The film received mostly positive reviews, with Variety saying it's yet another "wildly against-type" role in his career. Bilge Ebiri of New York Magazine said it was a "riveting turn" for Grant. For his performance, he has received nominations for a Golden Globe Award, a Critics' Choice Award and a BAFTA Award for Best Actor in a Leading Role. In 2025, Grant returned to the romantic comedy genre in a supporting role, reprising his role as Daniel Cleaver in Bridget Jones: Mad About the Boy. Grant has stated that his role is brief and the film has more dramatic depth than previous parts, claiming the script has made him cry. The film has received a positive reception and The Hollywood Reporter review commented: "Grant, who scores many of the script's best lines, brings a shot of mischievous vitality every time he's onscreen, as well as some poignant commentary on mortality and lasting connection during a sobering juncture for Daniel. The actor's career renaissance of the past decade has made him a value-added bonus to pretty much any project in which he appears." In a negative review of the film, The Guardian still praised Grant's performance, citing him as the only cast member, alongside Emma Thompson, who doesn't phone it in.

== Acting credits and accolades ==
Over his career Grant has received numerous accolades including a BAFTA Award (from five nominations), a Golden Globe Award (from seven nominations), and the Volpi Cup for Best Actor. He has also received nominations for two Primetime Emmy Awards and four Screen Actors Guild Awards.

== Screen persona ==
Grant began his career as a character actor but became predominantly a comedy (especially a romantic comedy) actor from his rise to stardom in mid-1990s until the 2010s. He said he moved away from romantic comedies after the failure of Did You Hear About the Morgans? (2009). In a 2020 interview with The Sydney Morning Herald, he said: "I got old and ugly and I'm not appropriate for romantic comedy films anymore, which has been a great blessing". Even though his recent credits include political dramas like A Very English Scandal and crime films like The Gentlemen, Grant is still often associated with his Richard Curtis-scripted romantic comedy films. In the British press, it is common to compare young romantic comedy actors to him.

I've never been tempted to do the part where I cry or get AIDS or save some people from a concentration camp just to get good reviews. I genuinely believe that comedy acting, light comedy acting, is as hard as, if not harder than serious acting, and it genuinely doesn't bother me that all the prizes and the good reviews automatically by knee-jerk reaction go to the deepest, darkest, most serious performances and parts. It makes me laugh.

— Grant explaining his propensity for comedic roles, 2010

Remarking upon his romantic comedy star era, some film critics, such as Roger Ebert, have defended the limited variety of his performances, while some others have dismissed Grant as a "one-trick pony". Eric Fellner, co-owner of Working Title Films and a longtime collaborator, said, "His range hasn't been fully tested, but each performance is unique." Many of Grant's films of the 1990s followed a similar plot that captured an optimistic bachelor experiencing a series of embarrassing incidents to find true love, often with an American woman. In earlier films, he was adept at plugging into the stereotype of a repressed Englishman for humorous effects, allowing him to gently satirise his characters as he summed them up and played against the type simultaneously. These performances were sometimes deemed excessive, in the words of The Washington Post's Rita Kempley, due to Grant's "comic overreactions—the mugging, the stuttering, the fluttering eyelids". She added: "He's got more tics than Benny Hill." His penchant for conveying his characters' feelings with mannerisms, rather than direct emotions, has been one of the foremost objections raised against his acting style. Stephen Hunter of The Washington Post once stated that, to be effective as a comic performer, Grant must get "his jiving and shucking under control". Film historian David Thomson opined in The New Biographical Dictionary of Film that the actor equated merely "itchy mannerisms" with screen acting.

Grant's screen persona in his films of the 2000s gradually developed into a cynical, self-loathing cad. Claudia Puig of USA Today celebrated this transformation with the observation that finally "gone [were] the self-conscious 'Aren't I adorable' mannerisms that seemed endearing at the start of his film career but have grown cloying in more recent movies". According to Carina Chocano, amongst film critics, the two tropes most commonly associated with Grant are that he reinvented his screen persona in Bridget Jones's Diary and About a Boy and dreads the possibility of becoming a parody of himself.

Nonetheless, Grant has occasionally acted in dramas. He played a sleazy, snide community theatre director with a penchant for young actors in the drama film An Awfully Big Adventure, which received critical praise, and for "a very quiet, dignified" performance as Frédéric Chopin in James Lapine's biopic film Impromptu. In 2012, he played six "incredibly evil" characters in the epic drama film Cloud Atlas, an experience he has talked about positively, saying:

I thought before I read it that I'd turn it down, which I normally do, but I was interested in meeting [Cloud Atlas co-directors] the Wachowskis because I have always admired them enormously. And they are so charming and fascinating.... I slightly called my own bluff. In one of the parts I am a cannibal, about 2,000 years in the future, and I thought, "I can do that. It's easy." And then I am suddenly standing in a cannibal skirt on a mountaintop in Germany and they are saying, "You know, hungry! We must have that flesh-eating, like a leopard who is so hungry", and I am thinking, "I can't do that! Just give me a witty line!"

After Cloud Atlas, Grant has never starred in a romantic comedy film with exceptions of the dramedy The Rewrite (2014), where "romantic comedy is only a small part of it." and his brief return as his Bridget Jones character Daniel Cleaver in Bridget Jones: Mad About the Boy (2025). Grant is known as a meticulous performer who approaches his roles like a character actor, working hard to make his acting appear spontaneous. In a career spanning more than 35 years, Grant has repeatedly claimed that acting was not his true calling, but rather a career that developed by happenstance. However, in 2020, after moving on to more character roles, he has stated that he "enjoys acting now".

== Personality ==
Grant has expressed boredom with playing the celebrity in the press and is known in the media for his guarded privacy. On probing of his personal life, he has remained steadfast in "offering a dead bat to any question he feels is not general enough". He has described himself as a reluctant actor, has called being a successful actor a mistake and has repeatedly talked of his hope that film stardom would just be "a phase" in his life, lasting no more than ten years.

A 2007 Vogue profile referred to him as a man with a "professionally misanthropic mystique". He has expressed distaste for focus groups, market research, and emphasis on opening weekend box-office numbers, saying: "It's so destructive to the filmmaking process. What was wrong with the way they used to release films, more slowly, let them build?" The director Mike Newell has said: "There is at least as much of Hugh that is charismatic, intellectual, and whose tongue is maybe too clever for its own good as there is of him that's gorgeous and kind of woolly and flubsy." Filmmaker Paul Weitz said that Grant is funny and that "he perceives flaws in himself and other people, and then he cares about their humanity nonetheless". British newspapers regularly refer to him as "grumpy".

Grant is a self-confessed "committed and passionate" perfectionist on a film set. The American film critic Dave Kehr has written that Grant "is known in the film industry as a meticulous performer who takes his time to prepare a role – someone who works hard to make it look easy – though that isn't a trait he admires in himself". He is noted by co-workers for demanding endless takes until he achieves the desired shot according to his own standard.

He dropped his agent in 2006, ending a 10-year relationship with CAA. He has proclaimed in interviews that he does not listen to external views on his career: "They've known for years that I have total control. I've never taken any advice on anything."

== In the media ==
=== Libel lawsuits ===
In 1996, Grant won substantial damages from News (UK) Ltd over what his lawyers called a "highly defamatory" article published in January 1995. The company's newspaper, Today, which ceased publication the following November, had falsely claimed that Grant verbally abused a young extra with a "foul-mouthed tongue lashing" on the set of The Englishman Who Went Up a Hill But Came Down a Mountain.

On 27 April 2007, he accepted undisclosed damages from Associated Newspapers over claims made about his relationships with his former girlfriends in three separate tabloid articles, which were published in the Daily Mail and The Mail on Sunday on 18, 21 and 24 February. His lawyer stated that all of the articles' "allegations and factual assertions are false". Grant said, in a written statement, that he took the action because: "I was tired of the Daily Mail and Mail on Sunday papers publishing almost entirely fictional articles about my private life for their own financial gain." He went on to take the opportunity to stress, "I'm also hoping that this statement in court might remind people that the so-called 'close friends' or 'close sources' on which these stories claim to be based almost never exist."

=== Legal issues ===
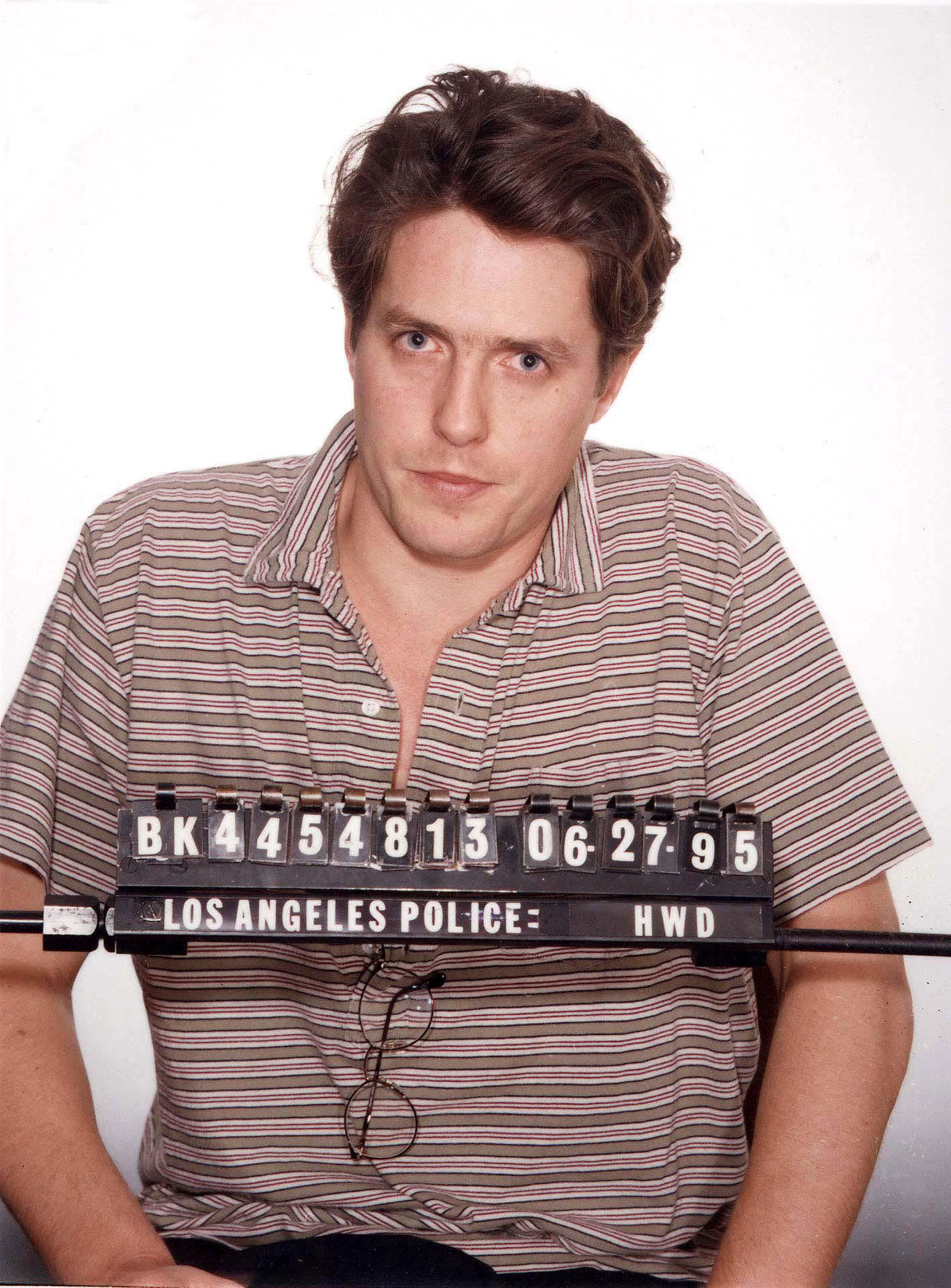
The famous mugshot of Grant in 1995

On 27 June 1995, Grant was arrested in Los Angeles, California, in a police vice operation near Sunset Boulevard for receiving oral sex in a public place from Hollywood prostitute Divine Brown. He pleaded no contest and was fined $1,180 by Judge Robert J. Sandoval, was placed on two years' summary probation, and was ordered to complete an AIDS education program.

The arrest occurred about two weeks before the release of his first major studio film, Nine Months, which he was scheduled to promote on several American television shows. The Tonight Show with Jay Leno had him booked for the same week. In the much-watched interview, Grant did not make excuses for the incident after Leno asked him, "What the hell were you thinking?" Grant answered, "I think you know in life what's a good thing to do and what's a bad thing, and I did a bad thing. And there you have it."

On Larry King Live, he declined host Larry King's repeated invitations to probe his psyche, saying that psychoanalysis was "more of an American syndrome" and he himself was "a bit old fashioned". He told the host: "I don't have excuses." CNN reported that "Many are also applauding Grant for his refreshing honesty in a culture that has become fed up with overuse of the word 'abuse,' but Grant did not resort to an excuse." Radio host Scott Shannon said, "He went ahead and faced the music and handled it with tongue [in] cheek."

In April 2007, he was arrested on allegations of assault made by paparazzo Ian Whittaker. Grant made no official statement and did not comment on the incident. Charges were dropped on 1 June 2007 by the Crown Prosecution Service on the grounds of "insufficient evidence".

=== Phone hacking exposé ===
In April 2011, Grant published an article in the New Statesman titled "The Bugger, Bugged" about a conversation (following an earlier encounter) with Paul McMullan, a former journalist and paparazzo for News of the World. In unguarded comments which were secretly taped by Grant, McMullan alleged that editors at the Daily Mail and News of the World, particularly Andy Coulson, had ordered journalists to engage in illegal phone tapping and had done so with the full knowledge of senior British politicians. McMullan also said that every British Prime Minister from Margaret Thatcher onwards had cultivated a close relationship with Rupert Murdoch and his senior executives. He stressed the friendship between David Cameron and Rebekah Brooks (née Wade), agreeing when asked that both of them must have been aware of illegal phone tapping, and asserting that Cameron's inaction could be explained by self-interest: "Cameron is very much in debt to Rebekah Wade for helping him not quite win the election ... So that was my submission to parliament – that Cameron's either a liar or an idiot."

When asked by Grant whether Cameron had encouraged the Metropolitan Police to "drag their feet" on investigating illegal phone tapping by Murdoch's journalists, McMullan agreed this had happened, and stated that police themselves had taken bribes from tabloid journalists: "20 percent of the Met has taken backhanders from tabloid hacks. So why would they want to open up that can of worms?... And what's wrong with that, anyway? It doesn't hurt anyone particularly."

Grant's article attracted considerable interest, due to both the revelatory content of the taped conversation, and the novelty of his "turning the tables" on a tabloid journalist.

While the allegations regarding the News of the World continued to receive coverage in the broadsheets and similar media (Grant appeared, for example, on BBC Radio 4) it was only with the revelation that the voicemail of murdered Milly Dowler had been hacked, and evidence for her murder enquiry had been deleted, that the coverage turned from media interest to widespread public (and eventually political) outrage. Grant became something of a spokesman against Murdoch's News Corporation, culminating in his appearance on BBC television's Question Time in July 2011. Grant later said: "It's been fascinating to have a little excursion into another world. I really needed that and also to be dealing with real life instead of creating synthetic life, which is what I've been doing for the last 25 years."

On 5 February 2018, Mirror Group Newspapers apologised for its actions towards Grant and other public figures, calling the affair "morally wrong". This came after Grant accepted a six-figure sum to settle a High Court action. He donated the payout to the press campaign group Hacked Off.

In April 2024 Grant announced that he had settled a case against the publisher of The Sun, News Group Newspapers (NGN). In the case, Grant had claimed journalists employed by NGN had used private investigators to tap his phone and burgle his house. Grant said he "did not want to accept" the "enormous sum of money" he had been offered to settle—but that a trial was likely to prove "very expensive". Grant further stated that had he proceeded he would have faced a bill of up to £10 million even if he had won the case. NGN denied the claims against it.

== Personal life ==
=== Relationships ===
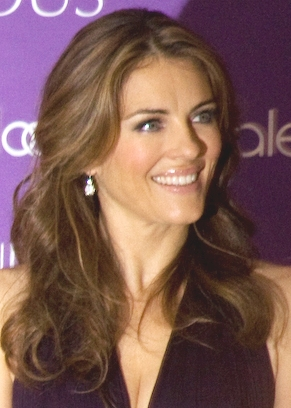
Elizabeth Hurley (pictured in 2008) was in a much publicised relationship with Grant between 1987 and 2000.

In 1987, while playing Lord Byron in the Spanish production Remando Al Viento (1988), Grant met actress Elizabeth Hurley, who was cast in a supporting role as Byron's former lover Claire Clairmont. He began dating Hurley during filming and their relationship was subsequently the subject of much media attention. While dating Hurley, Grant gained international notoriety for soliciting the services of prostitute Divine Brown, in 1995. They separated in May 2000. Grant is godfather to Hurley's son Damian, born in 2002.

Grant has five children with two women. In September 2011, he had a daughter with Tinglan Hong, who was variously misreported in the press as a receptionist at a Chinese restaurant in London or a Chinese actress. His daughter's Chinese name is Jing Xi (驚喜), meaning "happy surprise". Grant and Hong had a "fleeting affair", according to his publicist. In 2012, he stated that Hong had been "badly treated" by the media; the press intrusion prevented him from attending the birth of his daughter, with Hong obtaining an injunction to allow him to visit them in peace.

In September 2012, Grant's second child, a son, was born to Swedish television producer Anna Eberstein, daughter of Susanne Eberstein. Grant had also reunited briefly with Hong, and she gave birth to Grant's third child, a son, in December 2012.

Grant's daughters with Eberstein were born in December 2015 and March 2018. He and Eberstein married on 25 May 2018.

=== Political views ===
A prominent advocate of tactical voting, Grant is not affiliated with any political party, and has supported Labour, Lib Dem, and Independent candidates, appearing at various parties' meetings and conferences.

In 2011, Grant appeared at the Liberal Democrats' conference on the News International phone-hacking scandal, where he briefly met then-party leader Nick Clegg. Grant said that he was attending the Conservative and Labour conferences as well, but told Lib Dem activists that "You, more than any of the other parties, have a good bill of health. You have never been in bed with these scumbags."

In the 2015 general election, Grant endorsed two Labour candidates: Tom Watson, his former agent, Michael Foster, and expressed support for Liberal Democrat MP Danny Alexander and later hosted a dinner for the Liberal Democrats, in which he met the winner of a draw of donors to the party. In an email sent by former Liberal Democrat leader Paddy Ashdown, Grant wrote: "I am not a Lib Dem, a Tory, a Labourite or anything in particular but I recognise political guts."

During the 2019 general election Grant campaigned for tactical voting to stop a Conservative majority and Brexit. He was seen canvassing with Liberal Democrats candidates, Labour candidates, and independent Dominic Grieve.

In the 2024 general election, Grant publicly endorsed Carla Denyer, co-leader of the Green Party of England and Wales, for the newly established Bristol Central seat. Grant stated that Denyer was "a politician with integrity, who puts the public first".

=== Sport ===
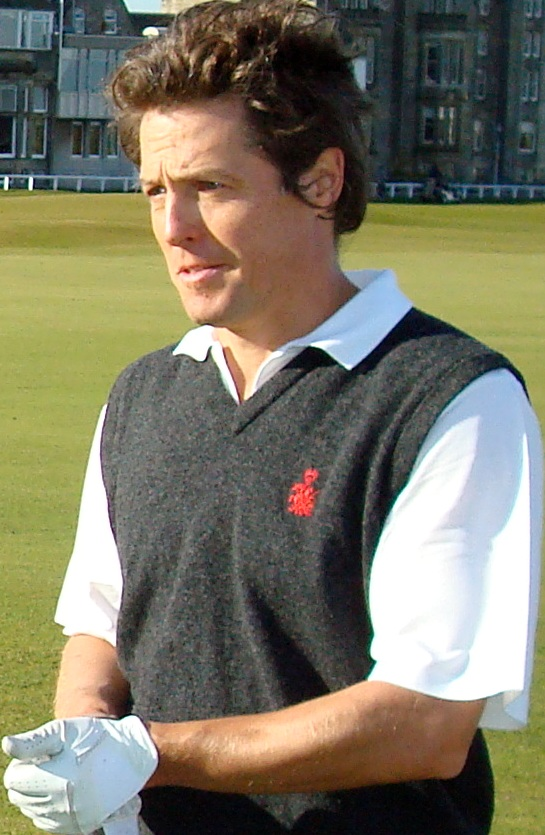
Grant during the Alfred Dunhill Links Championship, October 2007

As a young boy, he played rugby union on his school's first XV team at centre and also played football. He is a lifelong supporter of Fulham, He continued to play in a Sunday-morning football league in south-west London after college and remains an "impassioned Fulham supporter". He is also a supporter of Italian club Como. His other interests include tennis and snooker.

In 2011, the BBC apologised after Grant made an offhand joke about homosexuality and rugby when he was invited into the commentary box during coverage of an England v Scotland game at Twickenham Stadium. Talking about playing rugby during his school days, Grant said: "I discovered it hurt less if you tackled hard than if you tackled like a queen".

=== Relationships with co-stars ===
In 2018, Grant mentioned the on-set tension that he and Robert Downey Jr. had, stating: "He [Downey] hated me. He took one look at me and wanted to kill me. I was so hurt." After Grant confirmed their decades-long feud, Downey went on Twitter to publicly make amends with him, to which Grant agreed.

In addition to the confirmation, Grant also said that he and Drew Barrymore did not get along during production of Music and Lyrics. "Well, Drew, I think did hate me a bit. But I admired her. We just were very different human beings," Grant said. "She was very L.A. and I was an old grumpy Londoner. The funny thing is, although it was fractionally tense on the set of that film, I think the chemistry is rather good between us. Sometimes tension makes a good crackle." Barrymore had also been one out of three leading ladies Grant listed whom he did not get along with, the others being Julianne Moore and Rachel Weisz. However, on a Graham Norton Show appearance, Grant told Graham Norton he did not know why he mentioned Weisz and he was probably "going for a 'comedy triple'". He is now on good terms with Barrymore and appeared on The Drew Barrymore Show.

Grant has praised many other female co-stars, including Sandra Bullock, Sarah Jessica Parker, Emma Thompson, and Meryl Streep, who co-starred with him in Florence Foster Jenkins and was "a genius" according to Grant. He referred to his Bridget Jones's Diary co-star Renée Zellweger as "delightful".

=== Philanthropy ===
Grant is a patron of the DIPEx Charity, which operates the website Healthtalkonline. He is also patron of the Fynvola Foundation, named after his late mother; it supports the Lady Dane Farmhouse, a home in Faversham for adults with learning disabilities.

Since his mother's death in 2001, Grant has worked as a fundraiser and ambassador for Marie Curie Cancer Care, promoting the charity's annual Great Daffodil Appeal on several occasions. He is also a patron of Pancreatic Cancer Action.

In December 2023, Grant worked with Hammersmith and Fulham Council to support their annual Big H&F Christmas Day Lunch, with Grant spending Christmas Day serving Christmas dinner to elderly residents who might otherwise spend Christmas alone, and be at risk of social isolation and loneliness.

=== Investments ===
In 2001 Grant bought the print Liz by Andy Warhol for £2m. He sold it in 2007 for £13m.
