= Stephen Garrett (producer) =

British film and television producer (born 1957)

Stephen Garrett (born 16 April 1957) is a British film and television producer. He is best known for founding the Kudos production company, and executive producing the BBC spy dramas Spooks and The Night Manager. As a film producer and executive producer, his credits include Eastern Promises (2007), Miss Pettigrew Lives for a Day (2008), Salmon Fishing in the Yemen (2011) and The Undoing (2020). In 2016, he launched a new production company, Character Seven.

== Biography ==
Born on 16 April 1957, Stephen Garrett was educated at Westminster School and Merton College, Oxford where he read Jurisprudence and edited the university magazine Isis. In 1978 he started work at Granada, where he worked as a researcher on Granada Reports. From 1987 to 1992 he was Channel 4’s commissioning editor for youth programmes, commissioning The Word.

In 1992 Garrett founded Kudos, with partner Debbie Mason. As joint managing director, first with Debbie Mason, then with Jane Featherstone, and later Executive Chairman, Garrett oversaw the development and production of programmes such as Spooks, Life on Mars, Hustle, Burn Up, M.I. High, Law & Order: UK and Hunted. He produced the Simon Beaufoy scripted films Among Giants (1998) and Miss Pettigrew Lives for a Day (2008), the International Emmy Award-winning The Magician's House (1999), and Channel 4’s drama Psychos (1999).

He originated the idea for BBC One’s spy drama Spooks, on which he acted as executive producer for series one and a producer for 2015’s feature film Spooks: The Greater Good. Under Kudos’s filmmaking arm (and later Shine Pictures, after the sale of Kudos to Elisabeth Murdoch’s Shine Group) Garrett acted as executive producer on Keira Knightley’s Pure (2002), David Cronenberg's Eastern Promises (2007) and Salmon Fishing in the Yemen (2011), featuring Ewan McGregor and Emily Blunt.

In 2003 Kudos was named one of the top 50 most creative businesses in Britain and in 2007 it was voted Best Independent Production Company by Broadcast magazine. Kudos was bought by Shine TV for £35m in 2006. Garrett stood down from Kudos in 2014 to “reinvent [himself]” as an independent producer with the aim of “blurring the boundaries and the fusion of forms [of film and television]”.

In collaboration with the Ink Factory, through Character 7, Garrett was lead executive producer on The Night Manager (2016), a mini-series for AMC and the BBC based on the eponymous John le Carré novel. The series starred Hugh Laurie and Tom Hiddleston and was directed by Susanne Bier. In 2016, Garrett launched a new production company, Character Seven, with a focus on bringing new talent to the screen. The Night Manager was its first production.

Since then, Garrett has been the executive producer on series including The Undoing (for HBO), Culprits (for Disney+), The Rook for (Starz and Lionsgate), and a forthcoming second instalment of The Night Manager (for the BBC and Amazon Prime Video). The first series won three Golden Globes and was nominated for twelve Emmys.

Outside of production, Garrett is a member of the British Screen Forum and previously sat on the Development Board of the London Film School. In 2010, he was News International Visiting Professor of Broadcast Media at Oxford University, where he gave a series of lectures on creativity, business and the future of storytelling.

In theatre, Garrett is a founder investor and director of the production company Scenario Two, and sponsors and chairs the judging panel for the Verity Bargate Award for new writing, in partnership with Soho Theatre. Through Character 7, he also sponsors the Royal Court's Open Submissions Festival for new playwrights.
