= The Undoing =

2020 American television miniseries

- Genre: Drama; Mystery; Psychological thriller
- Created by: David E. Kelley
- Based on: You Should Have Known by Jean Hanff Korelitz
- Written by: David E. Kelley
- Directed by: Susanne Bier
- Starring: Nicole Kidman; Hugh Grant; Noah Jupe; Lily Rabe; Édgar Ramírez; Matilda De Angelis; Ismael Cruz Córdova; Donald Sutherland; Annaleigh Ashford; Noma Dumezweni; Edan Alexander; Fala Chen
- Music by: Evgueni Galperine and Sacha Galperine
- Opening theme: "Dream a Little Dream of Me" by Nicole Kidman
- Country of origin: United States
- Original language: English
- No. of episodes: 6

Production
- Executive producers: Celia Costas; Stephen Garrett; Bruna Papandrea; Per Saari; Nicole Kidman; David E. Kelley; Susanne Bier
- Producer: Deb Dyer
- Cinematography: Anthony Dod Mantle
- Editor: Ben Lester
- Running time: 50–67 minutes
- Production companies: David E. Kelley Productions; Blossom Films; Made Up Stories; HBO Entertainment

Original release
- Network: HBO
- Release: October 25 – November 29, 2020

The Undoing is an American mystery psychological thriller television miniseries based on the 2014 novel You Should Have Known by Jean Hanff Korelitz. It was written and produced by David E. Kelley and directed by Susanne Bier. The miniseries stars Nicole Kidman and Hugh Grant and premiered on HBO on October 25, 2020.

The Undoing was the first HBO show to gain viewership every week over the course of the season, and was the biggest American series to launch on Sky in the United Kingdom, beating the record previously held by Game of Thrones. It was the most-watched show on HBO in 2020. The series received positive reviews, with critics praising the performances (particularly Kidman and Grant), cinematography and production design, but some criticizing the writing, pace and characterization.

== Cast and characters ==
- Nicole Kidman as Grace Reinhardt Fraser
- Hugh Grant as Jonathan Fraser
- Noah Jupe as Henry Fraser
- Lily Rabe as Sylvia Steinetz
- Édgar Ramírez as Detective Joseph "Joe" Mendoza
- Matilda De Angelis as Elena Alves
- Donald Sutherland as Franklin Reinhardt
- Noma Dumezweni as Haley Fitzgerald
- Ismael Cruz Córdova as Fernando Alves
- Edan Alexander as Miguel Alves
- Fala Chen as Jolene McCall
- Annaleigh Ashford as Alexis Young
- Tarik Davis as Michael Hoffman
- Michael Devine as Detective Paul O'Rourke
- Maria Dizzia as Diane Porter
- Rosemary Harris as Janet Fraser
- Vedette Lim as Amanda Emory
- Janel Moloney as Sally Maybury
- Matt McGrath as Joseph Hoffman
- Jeremy Shamos as Robert Connaver
- Tracee Chimo Pallero as Rebecca Harkness
- Jason Kravits as Dr. Stuart Rosenfeld
- Sofie Gråbøl as Catherine Stamper
- Douglas Hodge as Robert Adelman
- Adriane Lenox as Judge Layla Scott
- Connie Chung as Herself

== Episodes ==
No.	Title	Directed by	Written by	Original release date	U.S. viewers (millions)
1	"The Undoing"	Susanne Bier	David E. Kelley	October 25, 2020	0.676
Grace Fraser is a successful psychologist who lives in Manhattan with her husband Jonathan, an oncologist, and their young son Henry, who attends the elite Reardon School. Grace helps some of the other Reardon parents plan an auction event, where she meets an enigmatic woman named Elena. Grace continues to encounter Elena over the next several days: once in a gym bathroom, where a nude Elena approaches her and remarks on her "kindness," and later at the auction itself, where Grace finds Elena crying in the bathroom and consoles her. As she leaves the event, Elena kisses Grace on the lips in the elevator. The next day, Elena's body is discovered in her artist's studio by her young son, also a Reardon student. The police rule the case a murder and question Grace and her friends; Elena's husband is noted as a potential suspect. Grace attempts to reach Jonathan, who is supposedly at an oncology conference in Cleveland, but finds that he has left his smartphone in the nightstand by their bed. Unable to trace her husband's whereabouts, Grace becomes paranoid and experiences visions of the scene of Elena's murder.
2	"The Missing"	Susanne Bier	David E. Kelley	November 1, 2020	0.799
Grace becomes increasingly worried about her husband and tries to locate him. A visit and questioning from Detective Joe Mendoza reveal that Jonathan is no longer employed at the hospital. His termination stems from allegations of inappropriate contact with Elena. It is determined that Elena's husband, Fernando, has an alibi, making Jonathan the prime suspect. Upon her return home, Grace finds the police conducting a search and seizure and is informed that they intend to perform a paternity test on Elena's infant daughter. To avoid media attention, Grace takes Henry to their beach house. There, Jonathan surprises Grace and admits to his infidelity but insists he did not murder Elena. As Jonathan hugs Henry, Grace calls the police.
3	"Do No Harm"	Susanne Bier	David E. Kelley	November 8, 2020	0.899
The police arrive via helicopter and arrest Jonathan. The detectives reveal Jonathan is the father of Elena's daughter. There is a short court hearing, and he goes to jail. Fernando confronts Grace. Grace later informs the police, and says that she felt threatened. The police indicate that Grace is also a suspect, and she asks why. The police then show a video from an outside camera around the place of the murder, on the night of the murder. The video shows Grace walking at night.
4	"See No Evil"	Susanne Bier	David E. Kelley	November 15, 2020	1.122
Further camera footage shows Grace walking by the same neighborhood numerous times the night of the murder, ruling her out as a suspect. Grace's father Franklin Reinhardt reluctantly arranges Jonathan's bail and hires Haley Fitzgerald as their defense attorney for the trial. The detectives reveal to Grace that Elena had developed an obsession with her through partially nude paintings. Jonathan tries to reason with Fernando regarding Elena's murder. Fernando wants nothing to do with Jonathan, but he allows Jonathan to tend to his and Elena's daughter. Haley arranges a television interview with Jonathan to help shape his public image for the trial. Jonathan claims to know who might have killed Elena.
5	"Trial by Fury"	Susanne Bier	David E. Kelley	November 22, 2020	1.277
The court case against Jonathan continues. His lawyer seeks to create reasonable doubt over Jonathan's guilt and suggests that Fernando could be a suspect but that the police dismissed this possibility. When she cross examines Fernando she asks if his wife was seeing a psychiatrist, which she was, and also if he is seeing one, which he denies. She then questions the detective who admits that he did not consider Fernando as a suspect and lies that there was no one else. The lawyer then shows the video of Grace. Jonathan reveals to Grace that he accidentally left the door open when he was 14, inadvertently causing his 4-year-old sister to be killed by a car. Grace calls his mother Janet, who says Jonathan never showed remorse or grief and estranged himself from his family when he grew up. Grace finds the hammer murder weapon in her son's violin case.
6	"The Bloody Truth"	Susanne Bier	David E. Kelley	November 29, 2020	1.811
Henry reveals he found the hammer in the fireplace at the family beach house and hid it to keep his father from being arrested. During the trial, Jonathan gives his testimony, admitting his infidelity, but insisting his innocence over Elena's murder. Haley brings Miguel to the stand, where Miguel suggests Fernando had been abusive towards Elena. Grace requests to take the stand and after claiming Jonathan to be a person of empathy, the prosecutor gets her to reveal her conversation with his mother. Jonathan and Haley realize Grace asked to take the stand as a ploy to allow her to suggest her belief in Jonathan's guilt. With Jonathan's conviction all but guaranteed, he asks Henry to breakfast before the verdict, only for it to be a ruse for Jonathan to escape with Henry. Flashbacks reveal Jonathan murdered Elena after ordering her to stay away from his family. After being chased by police and almost getting hit by a truck, Jonathan threatens to jump off a bridge and commit suicide. Grace arrives via helicopter to rescue Henry and the police arrest Jonathan.

== Production ==
=== Development ===
On March 12, 2018, it was announced that HBO had given the production a series order. The miniseries was written by David E. Kelley who also serves as executive producer alongside Nicole Kidman, Per Saari, and Bruna Papandrea. Production companies involved in the series include Blossom Films, Made Up Stories, and David E. Kelley Productions. On November 7, 2018, it was reported that Susanne Bier would direct every episode of the series and serve as an executive producer. On March 8, 2020, it was announced that the series was set to premiere on May 10, 2020. However, it was later delayed to October 25, 2020, due to the COVID-19 pandemic.

=== Casting ===
Alongside the initial series announcement, it was confirmed that, in addition to executive producing the series, Nicole Kidman had been cast in the series' lead female role. In November 2018, it was announced that Hugh Grant and Donald Sutherland had been cast in starring roles. On January 28, 2019, it was reported that Noah Jupe had joined the main cast. In March, Fala Chen, Édgar Ramírez, Lily Rabe, Ismael Cruz Córdova and Matilda De Angelis were added to the cast. In April 2019, it was announced that Noma Dumezweni had joined the cast. Also in April 2019, it was announced that Michael Devine had joined the cast.

=== Filming ===
Principal photography started on 14 March 2019. The show filmed in New York City and Kingston, New York. Planned filming on Shelter Island, New York, was canceled due to objections from residents, and therefore the beach and beach house scenes were instead filmed on the North Fork of Long Island.

== Reception ==
=== Critical response ===
On Rotten Tomatoes, the miniseries holds an approval rating of 75% based on 90 reviews, with an average rating of 7.20/10. The website's critics consensus reads, "The Undoing is a beautifully shot mystery that benefits greatly from Nicole Kidman and Hugh Grant's performances—if only its story was as strong as its star power." On Metacritic, it has a weighted average score of 64 out of 100 based on 32 reviews, indicating "generally favorable reviews".

Kristen Baldwin of Entertainment Weekly gave the series a 'B' grade and wrote, "Through all of the misdirects, the characters' dumb decisions, the dreamy detours, The Undoing kept me guessing—and, of course, gloating over everyone's misfortune." Reviewing the miniseries for Rolling Stone, Alan Sepinwall gave it 2 out of 5 stars and said, "It's all extremely rote, like an expanded version of the mid-budget Nineties movie that would have starred Kidman and Grant at their respective heights of celebrity."

Assessing the series as a whole following the finale, Roxana Hadadi of Vulture unfavorably compared The Undoing to David E. Kelley's previous series, Big Little Lies (also starring Kidman), stating, "Kelley re-created the elitism of Big Little Lies when adapting You Should Have Known into The Undoing, but neither its introspective spirit nor its curiosity about the inner lives of women." Hadadi particularly criticized the series for its inconsistent and shallow characterization of its protagonist, Grace Fraser, compared to Kidman's Big Little Lies character, Celeste Wright: "In prioritizing unbelievable twists rather than steady character development, Kelley re-creates Grace as a shell of Celeste, making her the hollow center of The Undoing. Grace wears the same kind of clothes as Celeste, and has access to the same powerful allies as Celeste, and lives in the same sort of mansions as Celeste. But Kidman's performance here is mostly one of wide, shocked eyes and blank, inexpressive despair; her Grace rarely, if ever, talks about herself, her emotions, or her decisions." Eve Gerber of The Atlantic criticized the series for glamorizing domestic violence, noting that critical discussion about the series largely avoided the subject and instead focused more on the series' production values, makeup and costuming.

=== Ratings ===
Viewership and ratings per episode of The Undoing
No.	Title	Air date	Rating (18–49)	Viewers (millions)	DVR viewers (millions)	Total viewers (millions)
1	"The Undoing"	October 25, 2020	0.08	0.676	—N/a	—N/a
2	"The Missing"	November 1, 2020	0.07	0.799	—N/a	—N/a
3	"Do No Harm"	November 8, 2020	0.12	0.899	—N/a	—N/a
4	"See No Evil"	November 15, 2020	0.15	1.122	1.01	2.13
5	"Trial by Fury"	November 22, 2020	0.14	1.277	0.99	2.26
6	"The Bloody Truth"	November 29, 2020	0.24	1.811	1.06	2.87

=== Audience viewership ===
The show was HBO's first original series to gain viewership every week over the course of the season and the finale was the most-watched night on the network since the Season 2 finale of Big Little Lies. It became HBO's most-watched show of 2020, surpassing the audience of "Big Little Lies". It also became the biggest U.S. show to launch on Sky in the U.K, beating the record previously held by Game of Thrones.

== Awards and nominations ==
Year	Award	Category	Nominee(s)	Result	Ref.
2020	Critics' Choice Television Awards	Best Limited Series	The Undoing	Nominated	
2020	Critics' Choice Television Awards	Best Actor in a Limited Series or TV Movie	Hugh Grant	Nominated	
2020	Critics' Choice Television Awards	Best Supporting Actor in a Limited Series or TV Movie	Donald Sutherland	Won	
2020	Directors Guild of America Awards	Outstanding Directorial Achievement in Movies for Television and Limited Series	Susanne Bier	Nominated	
2020	Golden Globe Awards	Best Limited Series or Television Film	The Undoing	Nominated	
2020	Golden Globe Awards	Best Actor – Limited Series or Television Film	Hugh Grant	Nominated	
2020	Golden Globe Awards	Best Actress – Limited Series or Television Film	Nicole Kidman	Nominated	
2020	Golden Globe Awards	Best Supporting Actor – Television	Donald Sutherland	Nominated	
2020	Hollywood Critics Association TV Awards	Best Broadcast Network or Cable Limited Series, Anthology Series or Live-Action Television Movie	The Undoing	Nominated	
2020	Hollywood Critics Association TV Awards	Best Actor in a Limited Series, Anthology Series or Television Movie	Hugh Grant	Nominated	
2020	Primetime Emmy Awards	Outstanding Lead Actor in a Limited or Anthology Series or Movie	Hugh Grant	Nominated	
2020	Primetime Creative Arts Emmy Awards	Outstanding Production Design for a Narrative Contemporary Program (One Hour or More)	Lester Cohen, Doug Huszti and Keri Lederman	Nominated	
2020	Producers Guild of America Awards	David L. Wolper Award for Outstanding Producer of Limited Series Television	Susanne Bier, David E. Kelley, Per Saari, Nicole Kidman, Bruna Papandrea, Stephen Garrett, Celia D. Costas and Deb Dyer	Nominated	
2020	Satellite Awards	Best Miniseries & Limited Series	The Undoing	Nominated	
2020	Satellite Awards	Best Actor in a Miniseries or TV Film	Hugh Grant	Nominated	
2020	Satellite Awards	Best Actress in a Miniseries or TV Film	Nicole Kidman	Nominated	
2020	Satellite Awards	Best Supporting Actor in a Series, Miniseries or Television Film	Donald Sutherland	Nominated	
2020	Satellite Awards	Best Supporting Actress in a Series, Miniseries or Television Film	Noma Dumezweni	Nominated	
2020	Screen Actors Guild Awards	Outstanding Performance by a Male Actor in a Television Movie or Limited Series	Hugh Grant	Nominated	
2020	Screen Actors Guild Awards	Outstanding Performance by a Female Actor in a Television Movie or Limited Series	Nicole Kidman	Nominated	
