= Heretic (film) =

2024 American horror film

- Theatrical release poster
- Directed by: Scott Beck; Bryan Woods
- Written by: Scott Beck; Bryan Woods
- Produced by: Stacey Sher; Scott Beck; Bryan Woods; Julia Glausi; Jeanette Volturno
- Starring: Hugh Grant; Sophie Thatcher; Chloe East
- Cinematography: Chung Chung-hoon
- Edited by: Justin Li
- Music by: Chris Bacon
- Production companies: Beck/Woods; Shiny Penny Productions; Catchlight Studios
- Distributed by: A24
- Release dates: September 8, 2024 (TIFF); November 8, 2024 (United States)
- Running time: 111 minutes
- Country: United States
- Language: English
- Budget: $10 million
- Box office: $60 million

Heretic is a 2024 American psychological horror film written and directed by Scott Beck and Bryan Woods. It follows two young Mormon missionaries (Sophie Thatcher and Chloe East) who visit the home of an eccentric man (Hugh Grant) after he expresses interest in Mormonism, only for his true intentions to quickly become clear.

Heretic premiered at the Toronto International Film Festival on September 8, 2024, and was released in the United States by A24 on November 8. It received positive reviews and grossed $60 million worldwide on a budget of $10 million. Grant received Best Actor nominations at the Golden Globes, the Critics' Choice Awards, and the BAFTA Awards, while Beck and Woods received an Independent Spirit Awards nomination for Best Screenplay.

== Plot ==
In Boulder, Colorado, two Mormon missionaries—eager Sister Paxton, age 19 and self-assured Sister Barnes, age 20—arrive at the home of Mr. Reed, a middle-aged man. After informing Reed that they can only enter a home if a woman is present, Reed invites them in, assuring them that his wife is preparing a blueberry pie in the kitchen. They sit and discuss religion, with Paxton expressing a desire to visit her loved ones after she dies in the form of a butterfly that lands on their hands. Reed reveals to the girls that he studied theology for decades and makes uncomfortable comments about their faith. The women continue to inquire about his wife's presence, and Reed excuses himself to go and speak to her. When he steps out of the room, Barnes realizes that the smell of blueberry pie has been coming from a scented candle. They attempt to leave but find the front door locked. Reed reappears and informs them that the front door is latched on a timer and will not open until the timer ends. At the church, Elder Kennedy, realizing that Paxton and Barnes are two hours late, goes out to look for them.

Reed gives the women a choice of two doors in order to exit the house: one if they believe in God and one if they do not. He then gives an ominous lecture, arguing that all religions are "iterations" of earlier ones, comparing the birth of Jesus to that of Mithras, Horus, and Islam. Barnes repudiates his claims, and the women enter the "Belief" door only to later discover that both doors lead to the same basement. In the basement, a decrepit woman appears, eats a poisoned pie, and dies. Reed informs them that the decrepit woman is a prophet of God and that they will witness her resurrection. Elder Kennedy arrives at Reed's home in search of Paxton and Barnes, but Reed distracts him at the front door. Unable to hear the two women screaming, he leaves.

The decrepit woman appears to be resurrected and describes the afterlife. Barnes rejects this, noting its similarity to hallucinations from near-death experiences. As Barnes gives Paxton a signal to attack Reed, he slashes Barnes' throat before Paxton can do so, then claims that Barnes will also rise from the dead. With Barnes bleeding heavily, Reed removes a metal object from inside her arm, claiming it is a microchip that proves that Barnes was not real and that life is a simulation. Paxton recognizes the object as a contraceptive implant, and realizes that everything was orchestrated by Reed while the women were distracted. A second woman hid the decrepit woman's corpse, took her place, and delivered the afterlife speech. However, the woman added the unplanned comment "it's not real", with Reed's killing of Barnes being an improvisation to cover the plan going awry.

Paxton discovers an underground chute and climbs into it, with Reed promising her it will show her the "one true religion". She passes through a series of chambers, the last of which is locked with the same lock she used to secure her bicycle before entering Reed's house. The last chamber is full of emaciated women in cages. Paxton realizes that Reed's goal is to prove his belief that all religions are rooted in a desire to control others. Paxton stabs Reed with a letter opener, but he stabs her as she tries to escape. As they both lie bleeding in the basement, Paxton begins to pray and responds to Reed's mockery by telling him that she prays out of concern for other people rather than to produce material results. As Reed prepares to kill her, Barnes reappears and bashes Reed's head in with a plank of wood covered in protruding nails, killing him before she collapses and dies. Paxton climbs out of a vent and escapes outside. She sees a butterfly landing on her hand, but it vanishes.

== Cast ==
- Hugh Grant as Mr. Reed
- Sophie Thatcher as Sister Barnes
- Chloe East as Sister Paxton
- Topher Grace as Elder Kennedy

== Production ==
In June 2023, it was reported that Scott Beck and Bryan Woods were writing and directing the film for A24. Hugh Grant and Chloe East were cast in lead roles, with Sophie Thatcher later rounding out the main cast and Topher Grace taking a minor role. Beck and Woods said the film was inspired by Inherit the Wind (1960) and Contact (1997), both films that discuss religion seriously but "in a kind of popcorn movie context". The writing of the film was prompted by the death of Woods' father from esophageal cancer and the questions this prompted about what happens after death. Wanting to ensure the missionary characters were as genuine and authentic as possible and not clichés, the filmmakers consulted various Mormon friends during writing and production, as well as Thatcher and East, who are ex-Mormons. Grant was cast after the filmmakers saw him playing six characters in Cloud Atlas (2012).

The production was granted an interim agreement allowing filming during the 2023 SAG-AFTRA strike. On a budget of under $10 million, principal photography took place in Vancouver from October 3 to November 16, 2023. The film was shot in chronological order.

Thatcher performs a cover version of Bob Dylan's "Knockin' on Heaven's Door" (with a similar arrangement to Mazzy Star's "Fade into You") that plays over the end credits. The statement that "no generative AI was used in the making of this film" is featured during the end credits, with Woods explaining to Variety, "We have no illusions that when people watch Heretic they’re going to go, 'Wait, did they use generative AI?' It doesn't feel like that at all, but it was important for us to put that out there because we think it's something people need to start talking about."

== Release ==
Heretic premiered at the Toronto International Film Festival on September 8, 2024. It was then released in the United Kingdom and Ireland on November 1 and in the United States on November 8.

== Reception ==
=== Box office ===
As of February 17, 2025, Heretic has grossed $28 million in the United States and Canada, and $31.2 million in other territories, for a worldwide total of $59.2 million.

In the United States and Canada, Heretic was released alongside The Best Christmas Pageant Ever, Elevation, Weekend in Taipei, and the wide expansion of Anora, and was projected to gross around $8 million from 3,221 theaters in its opening weekend. The film made $4.3 million on its first day, including $1.2 million from Thursday night previews. It went on to debut to $11 million, finishing second behind holdover Venom: The Last Dance. The film made $5 million in its second weekend (a drop of 54.1%), and then $2.2 million in its third, finishing in fourth and seventh place, respectively.

=== Critical response ===
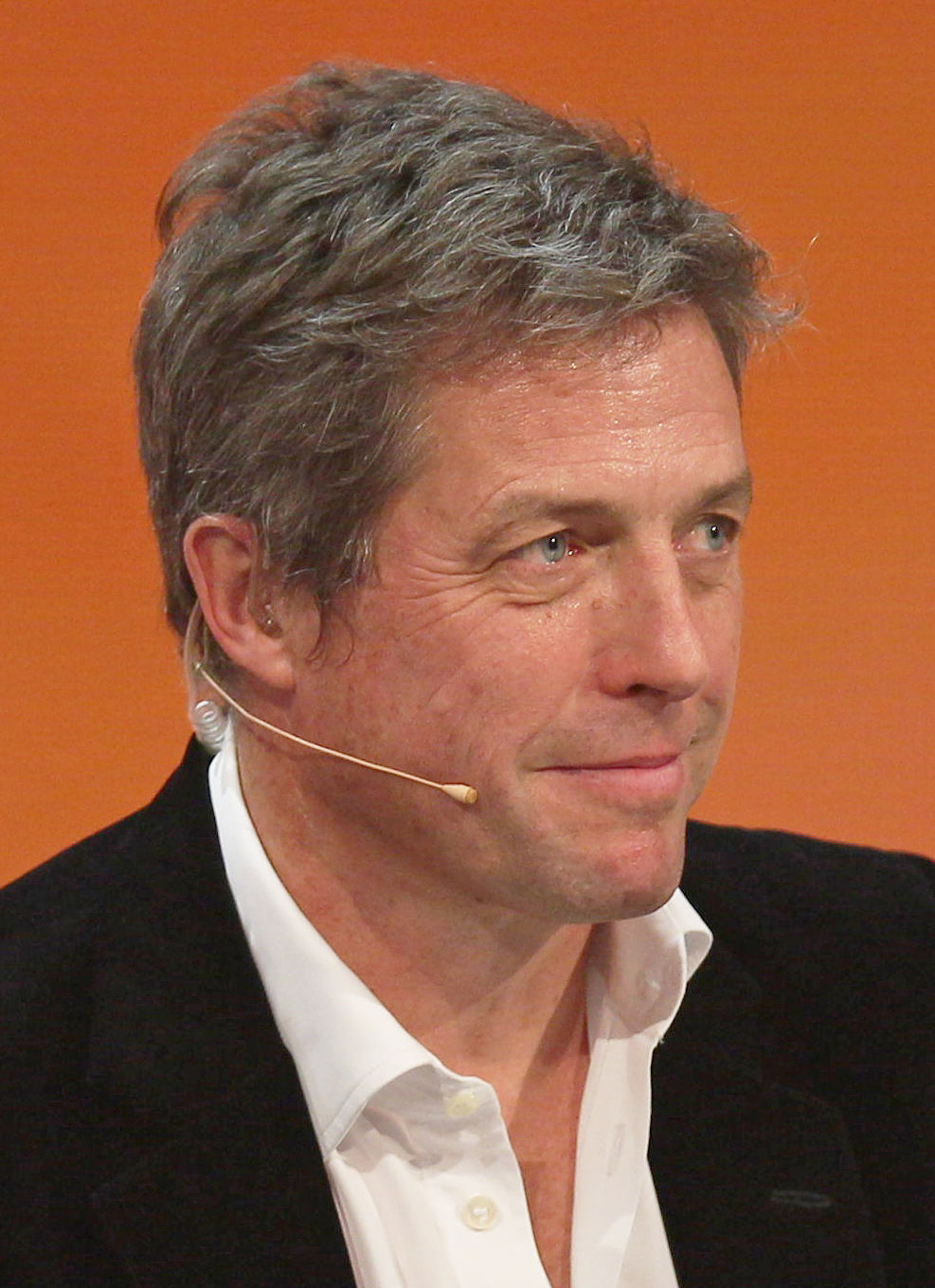
The performance of Hugh Grant was praised by critics.

On the review aggregator website Rotten Tomatoes, 90% of 291 critics' reviews are positive, with an average rating of 7.3/10. The website's consensus reads: "Hugh Grant has infectious fun playing against type in Heretic, a religious horror that preaches the gospel of cerebral chills over cheap shocks." Metacritic, which uses a weighted average, assigned the film a score of 71 out of 100, based on 49 critics, indicating "generally favorable" reviews. Audiences surveyed by CinemaScore gave the film an average grade of "C+" on an A+ to F scale, while those polled by PostTrak gave it a 70% overall positive score.

Brian Tallerico in his review for RogerEbert.com praised the performances, cinematography and the script calling it "a marvelous blend of religious history and sociopathic behavior". Peter Bradshaw, in a review for The Guardian, described the film as "gruesome and bizarre and preposterous" and highlighted the performance of Hugh Grant, calling him "suave, dapper and evil". McKay Coppins, in The Atlantic, described the film as "A Horror Movie About an Atheist Who Won't Shut Up". Filmmaker Rich Peppiatt named it one of his top 10 feature films of 2024, praising Grant's performance.

==== Church responses ====
The Church of Jesus Christ of Latter-Day Saints released a statement condemning the film's portrayal of violence against women. They then posted an article on missionary safety, intended to "assist journalists and the public with questions and concerns regarding the safety and well-being of missionaries". A number of former Latter-day Saints praised the film as a realistic and nuanced portrayal of missionaries.

Writing in The Christian Post, the Christian apologist Robin Schumacher noted that Mr. Reed became "his own god and asserting control over those around him—something that is indeed frightening". Schumacher concludes that Mr. Reed's behaviour in the film was consistent with Fyodor Dostoevsky's dictum: "Without God all things are permitted." Schumacher did criticize the film, however, for Mr. Reed spouting the claims of the Christ myth theory. In the same vein, Bret Eckelberry, in his review for Plugged In, critiques Heretic for presenting this "poorly evidenced fringe hypothesis widely rejected by both Christian and secular scholars" as "something new and shocking."

== Accolades ==
Award	Date of ceremony	Category	Recipient(s)	Result	Ref.
Astra Film Awards	December 8, 2024	Best Horror or Thriller Feature	Heretic	Nominated	
Astra Film Awards	December 8, 2024	Best Performance in a Horror or Thriller	Hugh Grant	Nominated	
Michigan Movie Critics Guild Awards	December 9, 2024	Best Actor	Hugh Grant	Nominated	
Las Vegas Film Critics Society Awards	December 9, 2024	Best Actor	Hugh Grant	Nominated	
Las Vegas Film Critics Society Awards	December 9, 2024	Best Horror/Sci-Fi	Heretic	Nominated	
Phoenix Critics Circle Awards	December 12, 2024	Best Horror Film	Heretic	Nominated	
St. Louis Film Critics Association Awards	December 15, 2024	Best Horror Film	Heretic	Nominated	
St. Louis Film Critics Association Awards	December 15, 2024	Best Actor	Hugh Grant	Nominated	
Dallas–Fort Worth Film Critics Association Awards	December 18, 2024	Best Actor	Hugh Grant	5th place	
Philadelphia Film Critics Circle Awards	December 21, 2024	Best Actor	Hugh Grant	Runner-up	
Online Association of Female Film Critics Awards	December 23, 2024	Best Male Lead	Hugh Grant	Nominated	
Greater Western New York Film Critics Association Awards	January 4, 2025	Best Actor	Hugh Grant	Nominated	
Golden Globe Awards	January 5, 2025	Best Actor in a Motion Picture – Musical or Comedy	Hugh Grant	Nominated	
Austin Film Critics Association Awards	January 6, 2025	Best Actor	Hugh Grant	Nominated	
Alliance of Women Film Journalists Awards	January 7, 2025	Best Actor	Hugh Grant	Nominated	
Music City Film Critics Association Awards	January 10, 2025	Best Horror Film	Heretic	Nominated	
Utah Film Critics Association Awards	January 11, 2025	Best Performance in a Science-Fiction, Fantasy, or Horror Film	Hugh Grant	Nominated	
Hawaii Film Critics Society Awards	January 13, 2025	Best Actor	Hugh Grant	Nominated	
Hawaii Film Critics Society Awards	January 13, 2025	Best Horror Film	Heretic	Nominated	
Chicago Indie Critics Awards	January 18, 2025	Best Actor	Hugh Grant	Nominated	
Houston Film Critics Society Awards	January 22, 2025	Best Actor	Hugh Grant	Nominated	
Satellite Awards	January 26, 2025	Best Actor – Motion Picture Drama	Hugh Grant	Nominated	
Critics' Choice Movie Awards	February 7, 2025	Best Actor	Hugh Grant	Nominated	
Artios Awards	February 12, 2025	Outstanding Achievement in Casting – Feature Studio or Independent Film (Comedy)	Carmen Cuba, Charley Medigovich, Tiffany Mak	Nominated	
Society of Composers & Lyricists Awards	February 12, 2025	Outstanding Original Score for an Independent Film	Chris Bacon	Nominated	
British Academy Film Awards	February 16, 2025	Best Actor in a Leading Role	Hugh Grant	Nominated	
Independent Spirit Awards	February 22, 2025	Best Screenplay	Scott Beck and Bryan Woods	Nominated	
Golden Trailer Awards	May 29, 2025	Best Horror	A24 / AV Squad (for "Witness")	Nominated	
Critics' Choice Super Awards	August 7, 2025	Best Horror Movie	Heretic	Nominated	
Critics' Choice Super Awards	August 7, 2025	Best Actor in a Horror Movie	Hugh Grant	Nominated	
Critics' Choice Super Awards	August 7, 2025	Best Villain in a Movie	Hugh Grant	Won	
Fangoria Chainsaw Awards	October 19, 2025	Best Wide Release	Heretic	Nominated	
Fangoria Chainsaw Awards	October 19, 2025	Best Supporting Performance	Hugh Grant	Nominated	
Fangoria Chainsaw Awards	October 19, 2025	Best Screenplay	Scott Beck and Bryan Woods	Nominated	
