= Arts in the Armed Forces =

American non-profit (2006–2023)

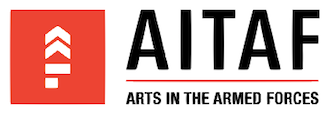
- Abbreviation: AITAF
- Founder: Adam Driver
- Dissolved: February 1, 2023
- Co-Founder: Joanne Tucker
- Executive Director: Lindsay Miserandino
- Artistic Director: Erica Newhouse
- Philanthropic Partnerships Director: Nicole Davis
- Key people: Brian Lepak, Program Manager; Giselle Futrell, Community Relations Manager
- Staff: 5

Arts in the Armed Forces, Inc. (AITAF) was a non-profit based in Brooklyn, New York that brought arts programming to active-duty service members, veterans, military support staff of the United States and their families around the world free of charge.

The organization was founded by actors Adam Driver and Joanne Tucker in 2006. The non-profit became an official incorporation in 2008.

AITAF served all branches of the military at US installations domestically and abroad. They chose content that features diverse themes, ages, ethnicities and experiences. Following each of AITAF’s events, the artists would interact with the audience through a question and answer session.

AITAF’s mission was to "honor and enrich the lives of the US military community by offering powerful shared experiences in theater and film. Featuring professional artists and contemporary American content, creating space for meaningful dialogue, igniting connection and deepening our capacity for understanding around our common humanity."

== The Bridge Awards ==
In 2018, The Bridge Award for Playwriting was established in honor of AITAF's tenth anniversary with the purpose of recognizing an emerging playwright of exceptional talent within the United States military. The biennial (as of 2020) award consists of a $10,000 prize, and an AITAF produced reading of the winning work.

In addition to bringing world-class theater to the military, AITAF is committed to supporting and sharing the talents of those who serve. This Award offers a deserving current military service member or veteran artist important connections with the theater community and access to developmental resources, helping to facilitate a deeper understanding and more active dialogue between military and civilian communities.

The Bridge Award for Playwriting winner is chosen by a selection committee, judged each year by a notable playwright. Past judges include Pulitzer Prize winners Suzan-Lori Parks and Tony Kushner.

2018 Bridge Award Winner: WAR STORIES by Vinnie Lyman (U.S. Army Veteran)

2019 Bridge Award Winner: TAMPONS, DEAD DOGS, AND OTHER DISPOSABLE THINGS by Shairi Engle (U.S. Air Force Veteran)

2020 Bridge Award Winner: LOCAL GODS by Anton Sattler (U.S. Marine Corps Veteran)

The Bridge Award for Screenwriting was established in 2020. This biennial Award is open to all persons who are currently serving or have served in the United States military, regardless of age, experience, or background. This Award seeks to identify and encourage talented screenwriters/filmmakers from the military community. First time screenwriters are encouraged to apply, and the Award is particularly interested in elevating and celebrating underrepresented voices and stories. The Award gives aspiring filmmakers with a military background the resources and mentorship to advance their visions and refine their work. It encourages members of the military community to conceive of themselves as artists and to tell their important and powerful stories.

This Award was created as a cinematic corollary to AITAF’s successful Bridge Award for Playwriting.

== In Media ==
AITAF was the subject of a short documentary produced by Vice News in 2015. The documentary chronicles the organization's first trip to perform in the Middle East at Camp Arifjan, a United States Army installation in Kuwait.

In 2016, Driver gave a TED Talk that discussed the non-profit at length and which ended with an AITAF reading.

Following the release of Star Wars: The Rise of Skywalker, fans of the franchise donated over $90,000 to the charity. Driver released a video thanking fans for their donations.

== Programming ==
Full List of AITAF's Programming
Event	Event Location	Event year	Artists Involved
Contemporary American Monologues	Camp Pendleton (Oceanside, CA)	2008	Jon Batiste, David Denman, Adam Driver, Gabriel Ebert, Laura Linney, Tracie Thoms, David Robaire, Joe Saylor
Contemporary American Monologues	Playwrights Horizons (New York, NY)	2009	Michael Sexton (Director); Lauren Ambrose, Francois Battiste, Eric Bogosian, Michael Chernus, Saidah Ekulona, Gibson Frazier, Ron Cephas Jones, Phil Kuehn, Tim Blake Nelson, Jesse J. Perez, Jay O. Sanders, Lili Taylor, Joanne Tucker, Debra Winger, Glenn Zaleski
Contemporary American Monologues	American Airlines Theatre (New York, NY)	2010	David Cromer (Director); Lauren Ambrose, Jon Batiste, Francois Battiste, Eric Bogosian, Louis Cancelmi, Reg. E Cathey, Amari Cheatom, Nick Choksi, Adam Driver, Saidah Ekulona, Gibson Frazier, Phil Kuehn, Darren Pettie, Jay O. Sanders, Susan Sarandon, Joanne Tucker, Dianne Wiest, Joe Saylor, John Patrick Shanley
Contemporary American Monologues	American Airlines Theatre (New York, NY)	2011	Michael Greif (Director); Jon Batiste, Francois Battiste, Vivenne Benesch, Marylouise Burke, Christopher Donahue, Adam Driver, Saidah Ekulona, John Glover, Renee Goldsberry, Zach Grenier, Ron Cephas Jones, Phil Kuehn, Jesse J. Perez, Joe Saylor, David Schwimmer, Peter Scolari, John Patrick Shanley, Tracie Thoms, Joanne Tucker, Harris Yulin
Contemporary American Monologues	Lucille Lortel Theatre (New York, NY)	2012	F. Murray Abraham, Francois Battiste, Marylouise Burke, Michael Daves, Eisa Davis, Adam Driver, Zach Grenier, Jake Gyllenhaal, William Jackson Harper, Frances McDormand, Michael Shannon, David Strathairn, Tracie Thoms, Joanne Tucker
Contemporary American Monologues	American Airlines Theatre (New York, NY)	2013	Francois Battiste, Eric Bogosian, Marylouise Burke, Michael Daves, Eisa Davis, Adam Driver, Natasha Lyonne, Jesse J. Perez, Reg Rogers, Amy Ryan, David Schwimmer, Michael Shannon, Joanne Tucker, Samira Wiley
Contemporary American Monologues	Ramstein Air Base (Germany)	2013	Reed Birney, Desmin Borges, Michael Chernus, Gary Cole, Adam Driver, Josh Hamilton, Elizabeth Rodriguez, Raven Symoné, Tracie Thoms, Joanne Tucker, Sheldon Woodley
Contemporary American Monologues	Walter Reed Memorial Center (Washington, D.C)	2013	Marylouise Burke, Reg E. Cathey, Michael Chernus, Gary Cole, Erin Cummings, Adam Driver, Donetta Lavinia Grays, Natalie Knepp, Reg Rogers, Paul Sparks, Tracie Thoms, Joanne Tucker
Veterans Day Celebration - OUR LADY OF 121st STREET by Stephen Adly Guirgis	Studio 54 (New York, NY)	2014	Sam Gold (Director); Francois Battiste, Desmin Borges, Guy Boyd, Phillip James Brannon, Salvatore Inzerillo, Justin Long, Adrian Martinez, Amy Ryan, Armando Riesco, Elizabeth Rodriguez, Joanne Tucker, Samira Wiley
Contemporary American Monologues	Camp Arifjan (Kuwait)	2015	Adam Driver, Saidah Ekulona, Gibson Frazier, Natasha Lyonne, Kristine Nielsen, Armando Riesco, Jay. O Sanders, Joanne Tucker
Veterans Day Celebration - LOBBY HERO by Kenneth Lonergan	Studio 54 (New York, NY)	2015	Mark Brokaw (Director); Francois Battiste, Rachel Brosnahan, Adam Driver, Corey Stoll
TAPE by Stephen Belber	Fort Hood (Killeen, TX)	2016	Stephen Belber (Director); Jessica Collins, Justin Long, Pablo Schreiber
LOBBY HERO by Kenneth Lonergan	Osan Air Base (Pyeongtaek, South Korea)	2016	Stephen Belber (Director); Adam Driver, Francois Battiste, Dominic Fumusa, Rachel Brosnahan
Contemporary American Monologues	United States Military Academy (West Point, NY)	2016	Lila Neugebauer (Director); Marylouise Burke, Anna Chlumsky, Chris Henry Coffey, Jackie Cruz, Saidah Ekulona, Bill Heck, William Jackson Harper, Shane McRae, Tony Patano, Reg Rogers
Veterans Day Celebration - TAPE by Stephen Belber	Studio 54 (New York, NY)	2016	Stephen Belber (Director); Adam Driver, Keri Russell, Pablo Schreiber
JESUS HOPPED THE A TRAIN by Stephen Adly Guirgis	Yokota Air Force Base (Japan)	2017	Leah Gardiner (Director); Christopher Abbott, Victor Almanzar, Anthony Ramos, Andre Royo, Samantha Soule
Contemporary American Monologues	U.S. Naval Academy (Annapolis, Maryland)	2017	Patricia McGregor (Director); Maechi Aharanwa, Frankie Alvarez, Kelly AuCoin, Marylouise Burke, Jack DiFalco, Brandon Dirden, Justin Long, Marisol Miranda, Tonya Pinkins, Peter Scolari, Kristen Sieh
JESUS HOPPED THE A TRAIN by Stephen Adly Guirgis	Industry City (Brooklyn, NY)	2017	Lucie Tiberghien (Director); Michael Chernus, Kathryn Erbe, Lawrence Gilliard, Bobby Moreno, Matt Servitto
TAPE by Stephen Belber	MCB Quantico (Virginia)	2017	Carolyn Cantor (Director); Kieran Culkin, Ryan Eggold, Mamie Gummer
LOBBY HERO by Kenneth Lonergan	Fort Hamilton (Brooklyn, NY)	2017	Lila Neugebauer (Director); Gabriel Ebert, William Jackson Harper, Michael Stahl-David, Grace Van Patten
LOBBY HERO by Kenneth Lonergan	KMC Onstage (Kaiserslautern, Germany)	2017	Moritz von Stuelpnagel (Director); Rachel Brosnahan, Gideon Glick, Darren Goldstein, Korey Jackson
Veterans Day Celebration - JESUS HOPPED THE A TRAIN by Stephen Adly Guirgis	American Airlines Theatre (New York, NY)	2017	Daniel Sullivan (Director); Laurence Fishburne, Anthony Ramos, Mark Ruffalo, Joanne Tucker, David Zayas
TRUE WEST by Sam Shepard	Bellows Air Force Station (Waimanalo, Hawaii)	2018	Stephen Belber (Director); Frances Conroy, Taye Diggs, David Harbour, Jimmi Simpson
TRUE WEST by Sam Shepard	Marine Corps Base Hawaii (Kaneohe Bay, HI)	2018	Stephen Belber (Director); Frances Conroy, Taye Diggs, David Harbour, Jimmi Simpson
TRUE WEST by Sam Shepard	Schofield Barracks (Honolulu, HI)	2018	Stephen Belber (Director); Frances Conroy, Taye Diggs, David Harbour, Jimmi Simpson
Film Screening: LOGAN LUCKY	NB Coronado (San Diego, CA)	2018	Adam Driver
FENCES by August Wilson	Air Force Academy (Colorado Springs, CO)	2018	Lileana Blain-Cruz (Director); Mamoudou Athie, Charlie Barnett, Leon Addison Brown, Tsebiyah Derry, Ray Anthony Thomas, Tracie Thoms, Mykelti Williamson
TOPDOG/UNDERDOG by Susan-Lori Parks	Joint Base Charleston (Charleston, SC)	2018	Kip Fagan (Director); Corey Hawkins, Korey Jackson
Film Screening: JAWS	Metrograph (New York, NY)	2018	Adam Driver, Steven Soderbergh
TRUE WEST by Sam Shepard	Joint Base McGuire-Dix-Lakehurst (New Jersey)	2018	Trip Cullman (Director); Annie Golden, Keegan-Michael Key, Christian Slater, Paul Sparks
Contemporary American Monologues	Rikers Island Veteran Housing Unit (Rikers Island, NY)	2018	Evan Cabnet (Director); Maechi Aharanwa, Trazana Beverly, Marylouise Burke, Michael Chernus, Gibson Frazier, Bobby Moreno, Peter Scolari, Roslyn Ruff, Joanne Tucker
1st Annual Bridge Award Reading: WAR STORIES by Vinnie Lyman	The Shiva at The Public Theater (New York, NY)	2018	Kip Fagan (Director); Steven Boyer, Alex Flores, Motell Foster, Jake Hart, Alex Hurt, Brian Quijada, Joe Tippett
1st Annual Student Veteran Film Screening: The Taking of Pelham One Two Three (1974)	Crosby Street Hotel (New York, NY)	2018	Adam Driver, Ben Stiller
Veterans Day Celebration - TRUE WEST by Sam Shepard	American Airlines Theatre (New York, NY)	2018	Sam Gold (Director); Marylouise Burke, Adam Driver, Peter Friedman, Michael Shannon
TRUE WEST by Sam Shepard	USS Carl Vinson (San Diego, CA)	2018	Kip Fagan (Director); Betsy Aidem, Scott Cohen, Patch Darragh, Dominic Fumusa
TRUE WEST by Sam Shepard	Fort Bliss (El Paso, TX)	2019	Amanda Charlton (Director); Patrick Fabian, Luke Kirby, Cameron Scoggins, Deborah Rush
FENCES by August Wilson	United States Military Academy (West Point, NY)	2019	Patricia McGregor (Director); Jerome Preston Bates, Chris Chalk, Clark Johnson, Jasminn Johnson, Ezra Knight, Reynaldo Piniella, Sharon Washington
Contemporary American Monologues	United States Disciplinary Barracks and Joint Regional Correctional Facility (Fort Leavenworth, KS)	2019	Joanne Tucker (Director); Carlo Albán, Charlie Barnett, Edmund Donovan, Robby Sella, Constance Shulman, Tracie Thoms, Joanne Tucker
TRUE WEST by Sam Shepard	Fort George G. Meade (Anne Arundel County, MD)	2019	Oliver Butler (Director); Noah Bean, Reed Birney, Jeremy Bobb, Annie Golden
TRUE WEST by Sam Shepard	Marine Corps Mountain Warfare Training Center (Bridgeport, CA)	2019	Kip Fagan (Director); Alex Breaux, Darren Pettie, Rob Riggle, Dale Soules
TRUE WEST by Sam Shepard	Steven A. Cohen Military Family Clinic at Endeavors (San Antonio, TX)	2019	Oliver Butler (Director); L. Scott Caldwell, Chad L. Coleman, Chris Lowell, Michael James Shaw
LOBBY HERO by Kenneth Lonergan	Joint Base Lewis-McChord (Tacoma, WA)	2019	Francois Battiste, Jeremy Bobb, Tracee Chimo, James Scully
Contemporary American Monologues	Saint Albans VA Hospital	2019	Joanne Tucker (Director); Jack DiFalco, Korey Jackson, Jasminn Johnson, Robby Sella, Constance Shulman, Leah Walsh
2nd Annual Student Veteran Film Screening: The Report	Alfred Lerner Hall, Columbia University (New York, NY)	2019	Eddy Moretti, Daniel J. Jones, Erica Newhouse, Brian Lepak (AITAF Intern)
2nd Annual Bridge Award Reading: TAMPONS, DEAD DOGS, AND OTHER DISPOSABLE THINGS by Shairi Engle	The Shiva at The Public Theater (New York, NY)	2019	Lucie Tiberghien (Director); Jennifer Mudge, Darren Pettie
Veterans Day Celebration - A RAISIN IN THE SUN by Lorraine Hansberry	American Airlines Theatre (New York, NY)	2019	Patricia McGregor (Director), Mamoudou Athie, Dylan Baker, Asante Blackk, Colman Domingo, Ezra Knight, Nyambi Nyambi, Karen Pittman, Pauletta Washington, DeWanda Wise
LOBBY HERO by Kenneth Lonergan	Camp Lemonnier (Djibouti, Africa)	2019	Joanne Tucker (Director), Kerry Bishé, Norbert Leo Butz, Chris Lowell, Michael James Shaw
Contemporary American Monologues	United States Disciplinary Barracks and Joint Regional Correctional Facility (Fort Leavenworth, KS)	2020	Betsy Aidem (Director), Maechi Aharanwa, Scott Cohen, Michael Daves, Motell Foster, Dion Mucciacito, Erica Newhouse, Frank Pando
Virtual Film Screening: The Hustler	Online	2020	Laurence Fishburne, Cole Smith (AITAF Intern)
Virtual Film Screening: True Romance	Online	2020	Rob Riggle, Cole Smith (AITAF Intern)
Virtual Film Screening: It's a Wonderful Life	Online	2020	Nnamdi Asomugha, Christopher Wolfe
Virtual Film Screening: Slap Shot	Online	2020	Laura Linney, Joanne Tucker
Virtual Film Screening: The King of Comedy	Online	2020	Michael Shannon, Cole Smith (AITAF Intern)
Virtual Film Screening: Paper Moon	Online	2020	Tim Blake Nelson, Cole Smith (AITAF Intern)
Virtual Film Screening: Malcolm X	Online	2020	William Jackson Harper, Larry Lennox-Choate
Virtual Film Screening: Pelle the Conqueror	Online	2020	Danny Glover, Malia Du Mont
Veterans Day Celebration - Virtual Film Screening: 2001: A Space Odyssey	Online	2020	Tom Hanks, Charles Bolden, Seth Meyers, Adam Driver
Virtual Film Screening: Rocky	Online	2021	Edi Gathegi
Virtual Film Screening: Amadeus	Online	2021	Annette Bening, Tom Hulce
Virtual Film Screening: Richard Pryor: Live in Concert	Online	2021	Judd Apatow, Phil Klay
Virtual Film Screening: I Love You, Man	Online	2021	Jon Huertas
Virtual Film Screening: Bicycle Thieves	Online	2021	Charles Burnett
Film Screening: Summer of Sam	Queens Drive-In at The New York Hall of Science (Queens, NY)	2021	Michael Imperioli
Contemporary American Monologues	United States Disciplinary Barracks and Joint Regional Correctional Facility (Fort Leavenworth, KS)	2022	Patricia McGregor (Director); Maechi Aharanwa, Josiah Bania, Francois Battiste, Bill Heck, Jennifer Mudge
Contemporary American Monologues	The Post Theater (Fort Leavenworth, KS)	2022	Patricia McGregor (Director); Maechi Aharanwa, Josiah Bania, Francois Battiste, Bill Heck, Jennifer Mudge
TRUE WEST by Sam Shepard	NAS Pensacola at National Naval Aviation Museum (Pensacola, FL)	2022	Kip Fagan (Director); Daniel Breaker, Adam Driver, Paul Sparks, Joanne Tucker
TRUE WEST by Sam Shepard	Fort Wadsworth (Staten Island, NY)	2022	Patricia McGregor (Director); Jason Butler Harner, Bill Heck, Reg Rogers, Constance Shulman
TRUE WEST by Sam Shepard	MK Air Base (Romania)	2022	Kip Fagan (Director); Adam Driver, Annie Golden, Reg Rogers, Liev Schreiber
Bridge Award Playwrights Retreat	Autocamp (Cape Cod, MA)	2022	Paula Vogel
LOBBY HERO by Kenneth Lonergan	Schofield Barracks (Honolulu, HI)	2022	Kip Fagan (Director); Scott Cohen, Dane DeHaan, Nyambi Nyambi, Victoria Pedretti
LOBBY HERO by Kenneth Lonergan	Joint Base Pearl Harbor-Hickam (Honolulu, HI)	2022	Kip Fagan (Director); Scott Cohen, Dane DeHaan, Nyambi Nyambi, Victoria Pedretti
3rd Annual Bridge Award Ceremony Reading: MAN ON THE GROUND by Timothy J. Bellow Sr.	The Shiva at The Public Theater (New York, NY)	2022	Patricia McGregor (Director); Brittany Bellizeare, Sherry Boone, Ezra Knight, Lizan Mitchell, Reynaldo Piniella, Calvin Leon Smith
Veterans Day Celebration - FAT HAM by James Ijames	American Airlines Theatre (New York, NY)	2022	Sideeq Heard (Director); J. Bernard Calloway, Nikki Crawford, Chris Herbie Holland, Alexandria Lewis, Adrianna Mitchell, Calvin Leon Smith, Marcel Spears, Benja Kay Thomas

== List of previously involved artists ==
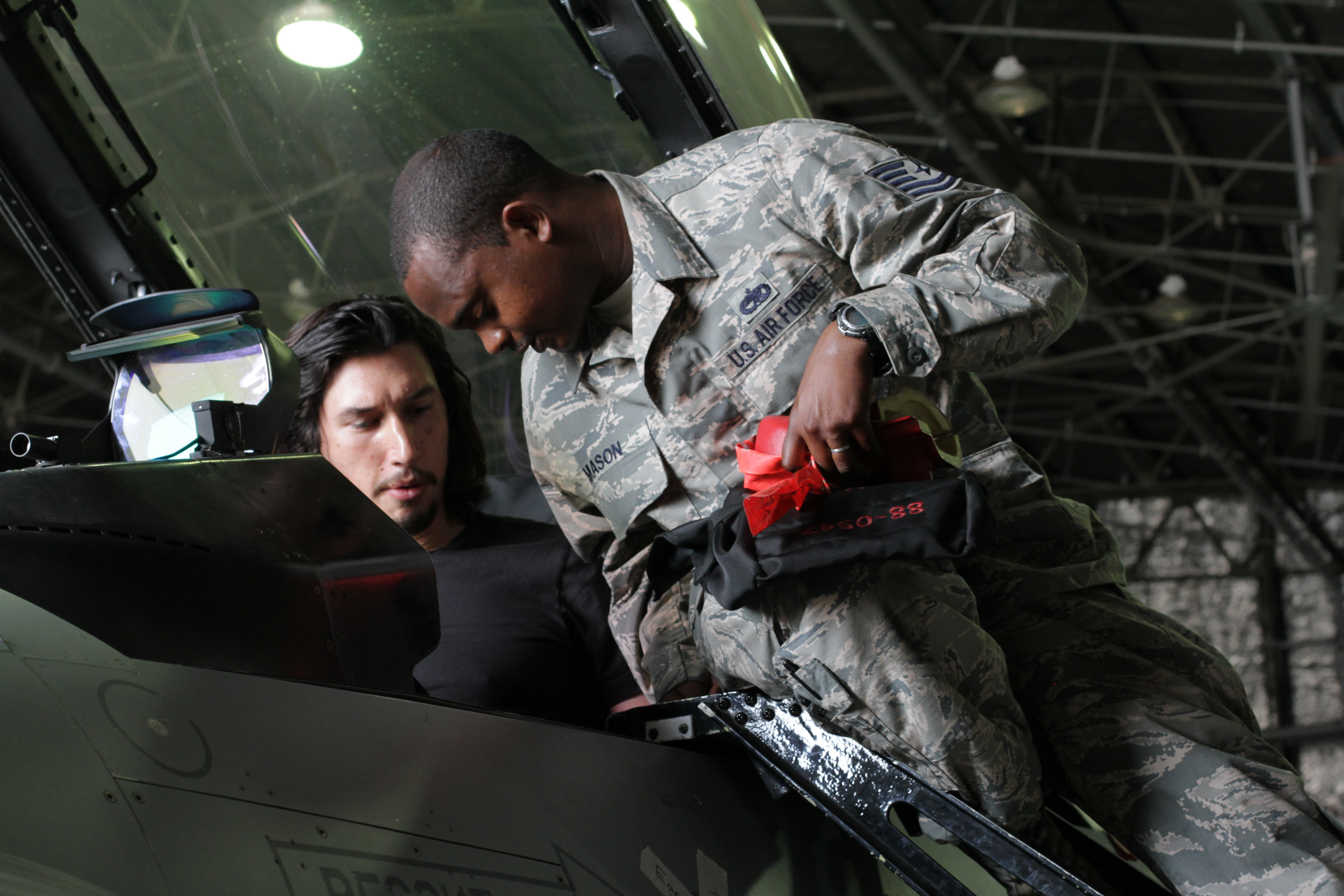
Adam Driver at Osan Air Base in 2016

A-D	E-P	Q-Z
Christopher Abbott F. Murray Abraham Maechi Aharanwa Betsy Aidem Carlo Albán Victor Almanzar Frankie Alvarez Lauren Ambrose Nnamdi Asomugha Mamoudou Athie Kelly AuCoin Dylan Baker Josiah Bania Charlie Barnett Jerome Preston Bates Jonathan Batiste Francois Battiste Noah Bean Robert Beitzel Stephen Belber Brittany Bellizeare Vivienne Benesch Trazana Beverley Reed Birney Kerry Bishé Asante Blackk Lileana Blain-Cruz Jeremy Bobb Eric Bogosian Charles Bolden Sherry Boone Desmin Borges Guy Boyd Steven Boyer Daniel Breaker Phillip James Brannon Alex Breaux Mark Brokaw Rachel Brosnahan Leon Addison Brown Marylouise Burke Jason Butler Harner Norbert Leo Butz Evan Cabnet L. Scott Caldwell J. Bernard Calloway Louis Cancelmi Carolyn Cantor Reg E. Cathey Chris Chalk Amanda Charlton Amari Cheatom Michael Chernus Tracee Chimo Anna Chlumsky Nick Choksi Chris Henry Coffey Scott Cohen Gary Cole Chad L. Coleman Jessica Collins Frances Conroy Nikki Crawford David Cromer Jackie Cruz Kieran Culkin Trip Cullman Erin Cummings Patch Darragh Michael Daves Eisa Davis Tsebiyah Derry Jack DiFalco Taye Diggs Brandon Dirden Dane DeHaan David Denman Colman Domingo Christopher Donahue Edmund Donovan Adam Driver	Ryan Eggold Gabriel Ebert Kathryn Erbe Saidah Ekulona Patrick Fabian Kip Fagan Laurence Fishburne Alex Flores Motell Foster Gibson Frazier Peter Friedman Dominic Fumusa Edi Gathegi Leah Gardiner Lawrence Gilliard Gideon Glick John Glover Sam Gold Annie Golden Renée Goldsberry Darren Goldstein Donetta Lavinia Grays Michael Greif Zach Grenier Jake Gyllenhaal Mamie Gummer Josh Hamilton Tom Hanks David Harbour William Jackson Harper Jake Hart Corey Hawkins Sideeq Heard Bill Heck Chris Herbie Holland Alex Hurt Salvatore Inzerillo Korey Jackson Clark Johnson Jasminn Johnson Daniel J. Jones Ron Cephas Jones Keegan-Michael Key Luke Kirby Natalie Knepp Ezra Knight Phil Kuehn Tyler La Marr Alexandria Lewis Laura Linney Justin Long Chris Lowell Natasha Lyonne Adrian Martinez Adrianna Mitchell Lizan Mitchell Frances McDormand Patricia McGregor Shane McRae Seth Meyers Marisol Miranda Bobby Moreno Eddy Moretti Dion Mucciacito Jennifer Mudge Tim Blake Nelson Lila Neugebauer Erica Newhouse Kristine Nielsen Nyambi Nyambi Frank Pando Annie Parisse Tonye Patano Victoria Pedretti Jesse J. Perez Darren Pettie Tonya Pinkins Reynaldo Piniella Karen Pittman	Brian Quijada Anthony Ramos Armando Riesco Rob Riggle David Robaire Elizabeth Rodriguez Reg Rogers Andre Royo Roslyn Ruff Mark Ruffalo Deborah Rush Keri Russell Amy Ryan Jay O. Sanders Susan Sarandon Joe Saylor Shane Schnetzler Liev Schreiber Pablo Schreiber David Schwimmer Cameron Scoggins Peter Scolari James Scully Robby Sella Matt Servitto Michael Sexton John Patrick Shanley Michael Shannon Michael James Shaw Constance Shulman Kristen Sieh Raven Symoné Jimmi Simpson Christian Slater Samantha Soule Dale Soules Steven Soderbergh Calvin Leon Smith Paul Sparks Marcel Spears Michael Stahl-David Ben Stiller Corey Stoll David Strathairn Daniel Sullivan Lili Taylor Ray Anthony Thomas Benja Kay Thomas Tracie Thoms Lucie Tiberghien Joe Tippett Joanne Tucker Grace Van Patten Vladimir Versailles Moritz Von Stuelpnagel Pauletta Washington Sharon Washington Leah Walsh Dianne Wiest Samira Wiley Mykelti Williamson Debra Winger DeWanda Wise Christopher Wolfe Sheldon Woodley Harris Yulin Glenn Zaleski Sasheer Zamata David Zayas
