= List of awards and nominations received by Adam Driver =

Adam Driver awards and nominations
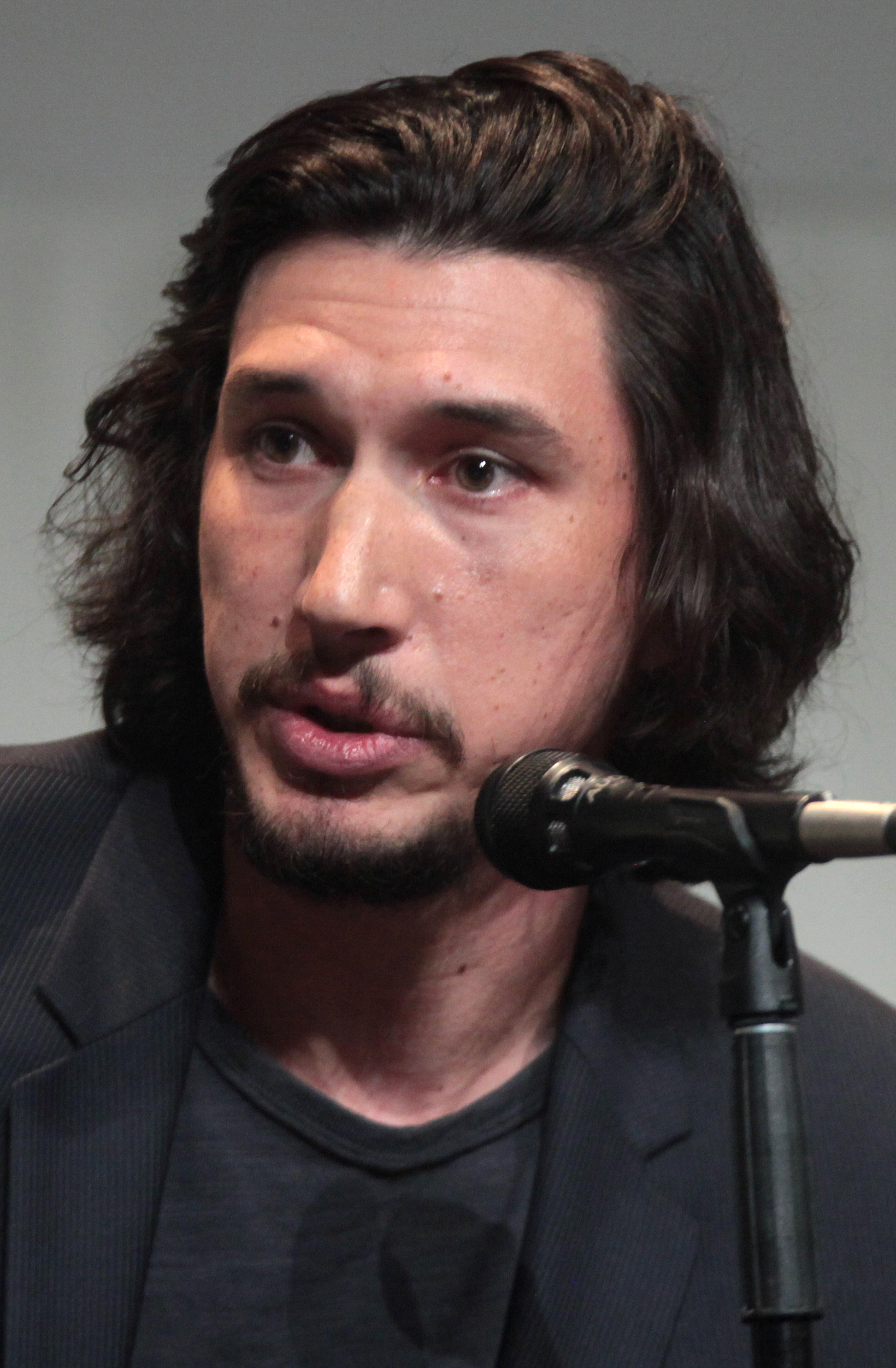
- Driver in 2015
Awards and nominations
Award	Wins	Nominations
Academy Awards	0	2
Actor Awards	0	4
BAFTA Awards	0	2
Emmy Awards	0	4
Golden Globe Awards	0	3
Tony Awards	0	1

Totals (Note: Certain award groups do not simply award one winner. They acknowledge several different recipients, have runners-up, and have third place. Since this is a specific recognition and is different from losing an award, runner-up mentions are considered wins in this award tally. For simplification and to avoid errors, each award in this list has been presumed to have had a prior nomination.)
- Wins: 46
- Nominations: 96

This article is a List of awards and nominations received by Adam Driver.

Adam Driver is an American actor known for his roles on stage and screen. He has received nominations for two Academy Awards, three Golden Globe Awards and two BAFTA Awards, four Primetime Emmy Awards, four Actor Awards, and a Tony Award.

For his performances on film, Driver has been nominated for two Academy Awards. He received his first nomination for Best Supporting Actor for his portrayal of a Jewish undercover agent infiltrating the KKK in the Spike Lee directed crime comedy-drama BlacKkKlansman (2018). This was followed by a nomination for Best Actor playing a stage director and father going through a divorce in Noah Baumbach's drama film Marriage Story (2019). He won the Volpi Cup for Best Actor for his role as engineer in the Italian drama Hungry Hearts (2014). For his role as Kylo Ren in the Star Wars sequel trilogy, Driver received a Saturn Award for Best Supporting Actor, one Teen Choice Award and a MTV Movie Award, while for Jim Jarmusch's drama Paterson (2016) he received multiple nominations for Best Actor from critics associations, winning several. He became only the second American actor, to be nominated for a César Award in France, for his role in Leos Carax's musical Annette (2022).

His breakthrough came in 2012 when he was cast in the Lena Dunham created HBO comedy-drama series Girls (2012–2017) where he portrayed the unstable actor Adam Sackler. The role earned Driver nominations for three consecutive Primetime Emmy Awards for Outstanding Supporting Actor in a Comedy Series as well as a nomination for the Critics' Choice Television Award for Best Supporting Actor in a Comedy Series. He was also nominated for the Primetime Emmy Award for Outstanding Guest Actor in a Comedy Series for hosting Saturday Night Live (2020).

For his roles on stage, he received a nomination for the Tony Award for Best Leading Actor in a Play portraying Pale, a menacing yet sensitive older brother in the Broadway revival of the Lanford Wilson play Burn This (2019). He won the Lucille Lortel Award for Outstanding Featured Actor in a Play for playing an easygoing working class roommate in the John Osborne realist play Look Back in Anger (2014).

== Major associations ==
=== Academy Awards ===
Year	Category	Nominated work	Result	Ref.
2019	Best Supporting Actor	BlacKkKlansman	Nominated	
2020	Best Actor	Marriage Story	Nominated	

=== Actor Awards ===
Year	Category	Nominated work	Result	Ref.
2013	Outstanding Cast in a Motion Picture	Lincoln	Nominated	
2019	Outstanding Cast in a Motion Picture	BlacKkKlansman	Nominated	
2019	Outstanding Male Actor in a Supporting Role	BlacKkKlansman	Nominated	
2020	Outstanding Male Actor in a Leading Role	Marriage Story	Nominated	
2022	Outstanding Cast in a Motion Picture	House of Gucci	Nominated	

=== BAFTA Awards ===
British Academy Film Awards
Year	Category	Nominated work	Result	Ref.
2018	Best Actor in a Supporting Role	BlacKkKlansman	Nominated	
2019	Best Actor in a Leading Role	Marriage Story	Nominated	

=== Emmy Awards ===
Primetime Emmy Awards
Year	Category	Nominated work	Result	Ref.
2013	Outstanding Supporting Actor in a Comedy Series	Girls (episode: "It's Back")	Nominated	
2014	Outstanding Supporting Actor in a Comedy Series	Girls (episode: "Two Plane Rides")	Nominated	
2015	Outstanding Supporting Actor in a Comedy Series	Girls (episode: "Close-Up")	Nominated	
2020	Outstanding Guest Actor in a Comedy Series	Saturday Night Live (episode: "Adam Driver / Halsey")	Nominated	

=== Golden Globe Awards ===
Year	Category	Nominated work	Result	Ref.
2019	Best Supporting Actor – Motion Picture	BlacKkKlansman	Nominated	
2020	Best Actor in a Motion Picture – Drama	Marriage Story	Nominated	
2023	Best Actor in a Motion Picture – Musical or Comedy	White Noise	Nominated	

=== Tony Awards ===
Year	Category	Nominated work	Result	Ref.
2019	Best Leading Actor in a Play	Burn This	Nominated	

== Critics awards ==
Year	Category	Nominated work	Result	Ref.
Alliance of Women Film Journalists
2018	Best Supporting Actor	BlacKkKlansman	Nominated	
2019	Best Actor	Marriage Story	Won	
Atlanta Film Critics Circle
2019	Best Actor	Marriage Story	Won	
Austin Film Critics Association
2019	Best Actor	Marriage Story	Nominated	
Columbus Film Critics Association
2018	Best Actor	BlacKkKlansman	Nominated	
2020	Best Actor	Marriage Story	Won	
2020	Actor of the Year	The Dead Don’t Die, Marriage Story, The Report, The Rise of Skywalker	Won	
Chicago Film Critics Association
2016	Best Actor	Paterson	Nominated	
2019	Best Actor	Marriage Story	Won	
Chicago Indie Critics Awards
2019	Best Actor	Marriage Story	Won	
Chicago Independent Film Critics Circle Awards
2018	Best Supporting Actor	BlacKkKlansman	Nominated	
Critics’ Choice Documentary Awards
2019	Best Narration	Joseph Pulitzer: Voice of the People	Nominated	
Critics' Choice Movie Awards
2013	Best Song	Inside Llewyn Davis	Nominated	
2019	Best Supporting Actor	BlacKkKlansman	Nominated	
2020	Best Actor	Marriage Story	Nominated	
Critics' Choice Television Awards
2015	Best Supporting Actor in a Comedy Series	Girls	Nominated	
Dallas–Fort Worth Film Critics Association
2019	Best Actor	Marriage Story	Won	
Denver Film Critics Society
2017	Best Actor	Paterson	Nominated	
2019	Best Supporting Actor	BlacKkKlansman	Nominated	
Detroit Film Critics Society
2019	Best Actor	Marriage Story	Won	
Dublin Film Critics' Circle
2016	Best Actor	Paterson	3rd place	
2019	Best Actor	Marriage Story	Won	
Film Critics Circle of Australia
2014	Best Actor in a Supporting Role	Tracks	Nominated	
Florida Film Critics Circle
2018	Best Supporting Actor	BlacKkKlansman	Nominated	
2019	Best Actor	Marriage Story	Won	
2021	Best Actor	Annette	Won	
Georgia Film Critics Association
2018	Best Supporting Actor	BlacKkKlansman	Nominated	
2019	Best Actor	Marriage Story	Won	
Hollywood Critics Association
2020	Actor of the Decade	Himself	Won	
Houston Film Critics Society
2013	Best Original Song	Inside Llewyn Davis	Won	
2019	Best Actor	Marriage Story	Won	
Indiana Film Journalists Association
2019	Best Actor	Marriage Story	Won	
IndieWire Critics Poll
2016	Best Actor	Paterson	2nd place	
2018	Best Supporting Actor	BlacKkKlansman	4th place	
2019	Best Actor	Marriage Story	Won	
Kansas City Film Critics Circle Awards
2019	Best Actor	Marriage Story	Won	
London Film Critics' Circle
2017	Actor of the Year	Paterson	Nominated	
2019	Supporting Actor of the Year	BlacKkKlansman	Nominated	
2020	Actor of the Year	Marriage Story	Nominated	
2021	Actor of the Year	Annette	Nominated	
Los Angeles Film Critics Association
2016	Best Actor	Paterson	Won	
2019	Best Actor	Marriage Story	2nd place	
National Society of Film Critics
2017	Best Actor	Paterson	3rd place	
Nevada Film Critics Society
2019	Best Actor	Marriage Story	Won	
North Carolina Film Critics Association
2019	Best Actor	Marriage Story	Won	
Online Association of Female Film Critics
2018	Best Supporting Actor	BlacKkKlansman	Nominated	
2019	Best Actor	Marriage Story	Won	
Online Film Critics Society
2016	Best Actor	Paterson	Nominated	
2018	Best Supporting Actor	BlacKkKlansman	Nominated	
2019	Best Actor	Marriage Story	Won	
Philadelphia Film Critics Circle
2019	Best Actor	Marriage Story	Won	
Phoenix Critics Circle
2018	Best Supporting Actor	BlacKkKlansman	Nominated	
2019	Best Actor	Marriage Story	Won	
2022	Best Actor	White Noise	Nominated	
Phoenix Critics Circle
2022	Best Actor	White Noise	Nominated	
San Diego Film Critics Society
2016	Best Actor	Paterson	Nominated	
2019	Best Actor	Marriage Story	Won	
San Francisco Film Critics Circle
2018	Best Supporting Actor	BlacKkKlansman	Nominated	
Seattle Film Critics Society
2019	Best Actor	Marriage Story	Won	
Southeastern Film Critics Association
2019	Best Actor	Marriage Story	Won	
Toronto Film Critics Association
2016	Best Actor	Paterson	Won	
2019	Best Actor	Marriage Story	Won	
Utah Film Critics Association
2019	Best Actor	Marriage Story	Won	
Vancouver Film Critics Circle
2019	Best Actor	Marriage Story	Won	
Washington D.C. Area Film Critics Association
2019	Best Actor	Marriage Story	Won	

== Film Festival awards ==
Year	Category	Nominated work	Result	Ref.
Los Cabos International Film Festival
2018	Outstanding Work in Cinema	BlacKkKlansman	Won	
Palm Springs International Film Festival
2020	Desert Palm Achievement Award, Actor	Marriage Story	Won	
Santa Barbara International Film Festival
2020	Outstanding Performers of the Year Award (with Scarlett Johansson)	Marriage Story	Won	
Venice International Film Festival
2014	Volpi Cup for Best Actor	Hungry Hearts	Won	

== Industry awards ==
Year	Category	Nominated work	Result	Ref.
AACTA Awards
2019	Best International Lead Actor in a Film – Cinema	Marriage Story	Won	
César Awards
2022	Best Actor	Annette	Nominated	
Gotham Independent Film Awards
2016	Best Actor	Paterson	Nominated	
2018	Best Actor	BlacKkKlansman	Nominated	
2019	Best Actor	Marriage Story	Won	
2026	Outstanding Supporting Performance	Paper Tiger	Pending	
Independent Spirit Awards
2019	Best Supporting Male	BlacKkKlansman	Nominated	
2020	Robert Altman Award	Marriage Story	Won	
Lucille Lortel Awards
2012	Outstanding Featured Actor in a Play	Look Back in Anger	Won	
MTV Movie & TV Awards
2016	Best Villain	Star Wars: The Force Awakens	Won	
2016	Best Fight (with Daisy Ridley)	Star Wars: The Force Awakens	Nominated	
2018	Best Villain	Star Wars: The Last Jedi	Nominated	
Sant Jordi Awards
2017	Best Actor in a Foreign Film	Paterson	Won	
Satellite Awards
2019	Best Supporting Actor	BlacKkKlansman	Nominated	
Saturn Awards
2016	Best Supporting Actor	Star Wars: The Force Awakens	Won	
2021	Best Supporting Actor	Star Wars: The Rise of Skywalker	Nominated	
Taron Awards
2019	Best Actor	Marriage Story	Won	
2021	Best Actor	Annette	Nominated	
Teen Choice Awards
2016	Choice Villain	Star Wars: The Force Awakens	Won	
2016	Choice Hissy Fit	Star Wars: The Force Awakens	Nominated	
2018	Choice Villain	Star Wars: The Last Jedi	Nominated	
2018	Choice Hissy Fit	Star Wars: The Last Jedi	Nominated	
Village Voice Film Poll
2016	Best Actor	Paterson	2nd place	
Young Hollywood Awards
2014	Fan Favorite Actor – Male	Tracks	Nominated	

== Theatre awards ==
Year	Category	Nominated work	Result	Ref.
Drama League Award
2019	Distinguished Performance	Burn This	Nominated	
2025	Distinguished Performance	Hold On to Me Darling	Nominated	
Lucille Lortel Awards
2012	Outstanding Featured Actor	Look Back in Anger	Won	
2025	Outstanding Lead Performer in a Play	Hold On to Me Darling	Nominated	
Outer Critics Circle Awards
2025	Outstanding Lead in an Off-Broadway Play	Hold On to Me Darling	Won	
