= Jon Hamm filmography =

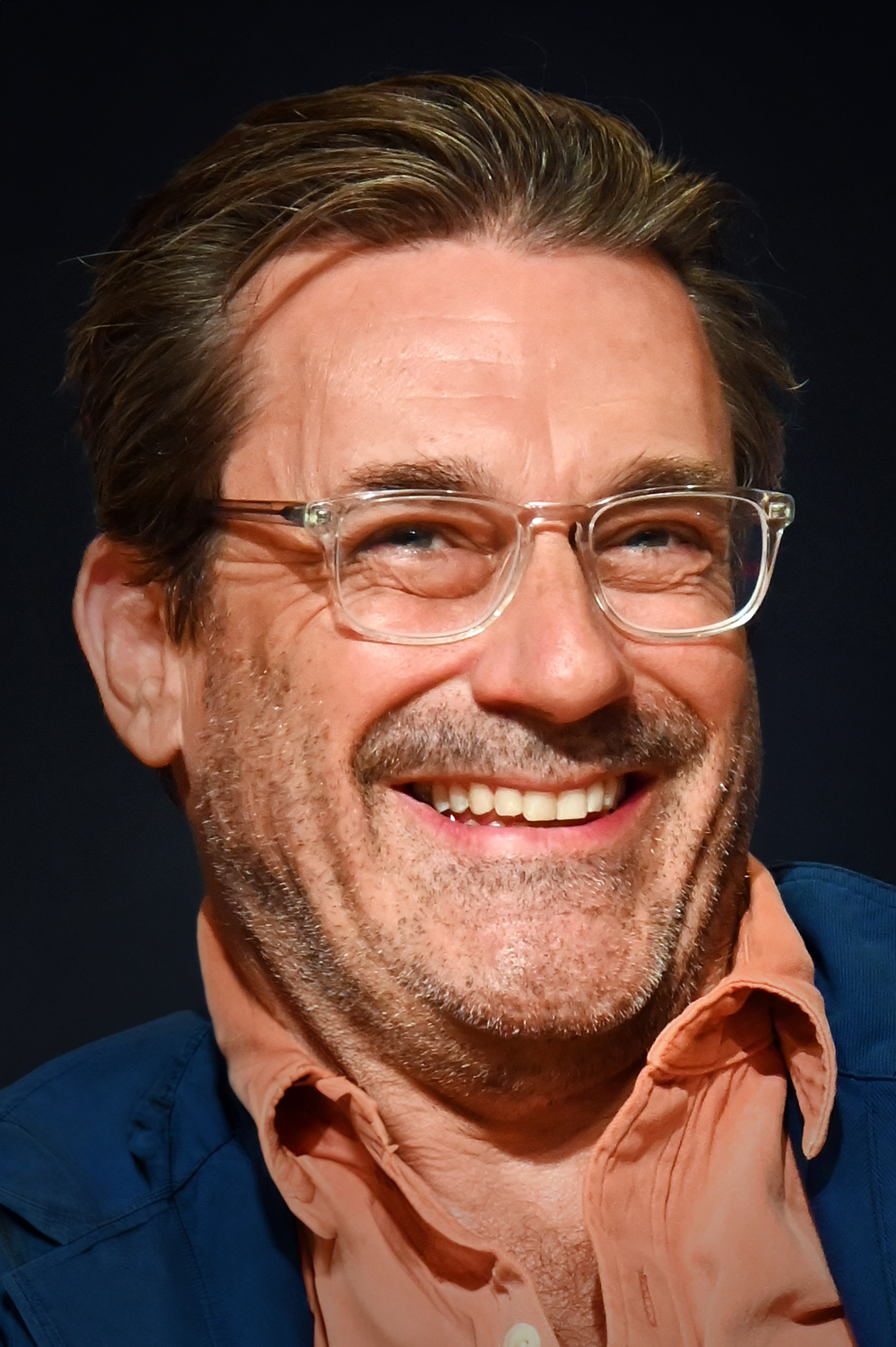
Hamm at the 2024 New York Comic Con

Jon Hamm is an American actor known for his performances in film and television. His first appearance was in 1996 as a contestant on the dating show The Big Date; his first acting role was in 1997 as an extra on Ally McBeal. While he found television work throughout the early 2000s, his breakthrough role was Don Draper in the 2007–2015 AMC drama series Mad Men. For his role as Draper, Hamm was nominated eight times at the Primetime Emmy Awards for Outstanding Lead Actor in a Drama Series, finally winning in 2015. To avoid being typecast, Hamm also appeared in comedies. In 2024, he told The Hollywood Reporter, "it was a very conscious decision to lean into the comedic stuff", citing Saturday Night Live and 30 Rock as examples; he received three Emmy nominations for the latter. In 2014, Hamm starred in the Black Mirror Christmas special "White Christmas", which is often considered one of the best episodes of the series.

His film debut was in the 2000 Clint Eastwood film Space Cowboys, in which he played a background character. He then had a supporting role in the indie film Kissing Jessica Stein. In 2010, Hamm costarred in The Town alongside Ben Affleck. He chose the role due to the lack of similarity to Draper. He has since starred in a number of movies including Million Dollar Arm, Baby Driver, Bad Times at the El Royale, and Top Gun: Maverick. In addition, he has had various voice roles including SpongeBob SquarePants, Invincible, and Big City Greens, as well as providing the voice of Boba Fett in several Star Wars audiobooks.

== Film ==
Key
†	Denotes works that have not yet been released

Film
Year	Title	Role	Notes	Ref
2000	Space Cowboys	Young Pilot No. 2		
2001	Kissing Jessica Stein	Charles		
2002	We Were Soldiers	Capt. Matt Dillon		
2006	Ira & Abby	Ronnie		
2007	The Ten	Chris Knarl		
2008	The Day the Earth Stood Still	Dr. Michael Granier		
2009	A Single Man	Hank Ackerley	Uncredited	
2009	Stolen	Tom Adkins Sr.		
2010	Shrek Forever After	Brogan	Voice	
2010	The A-Team	Agent Lynch	Cameo; uncredited	
2010	The Town	Adam Frawley		
2010	Howl	Jake Ehrlich		
2011	Sucker Punch	High Roller / Doctor		
2011	Bridesmaids	Ted	Uncredited	
2012	Friends with Kids	Ben	Also producer	
2013	The Congress	Dylan Truliner	Voice	
2014	Million Dollar Arm	J. B. Bernstein		
2015	Minions	Herb Overkill	Voice	
2016	Absolutely Fabulous: The Movie	Himself	Cameo	
2016	Keeping Up with the Joneses	Tim Jones		
2017	Marjorie Prime	Walter Prime	Also executive producer	
2017	Baby Driver	Jason "Buddy" Van Horne		
2017	Aardvark	Craig Norman		
2018	Nostalgia	Will Bleam		
2018	Beirut	Mason Skiles		
2018	Tag	Bob Callahan		
2018	Time of Day	Himself	Short film	
2018	Bad Times at the El Royale	Laramie Seymour Sullivan		
2019	The Report	Denis McDonough		
2019	Lucy in the Sky	Mark Goodwin		
2019	The Jesus Rolls	Paul Dominique		
2019	Richard Jewell	FBI Agent Tom Shaw		
2020	Wild Mountain Thyme	Adam Kelly		
2021	No Sudden Move	Detective Joe Finney		
2022	Top Gun: Maverick	Vice Admiral Beau "Cyclone" Simpson		
2022	Corner Office	Orson		
2022	Confess, Fletch	Irwin "Fletch" Fletcher	Also producer	
2023	Maggie Moore(s)	Chief Jordan Sanders		
2023	Metalocalypse: Army of the Doomstar	Fan		
2024	Mean Girls	Coach Carr		
2024	Unfrosted	Don Draper	Cameo	
2024	Transformers One	Sentinel Prime	Voice	
2026	Gail Daughtry and the Celebrity Sex Pass	Himself	Also executive producer	
2026	Hoppers	Mayor Jerry Generazzo	Voice	
TBA	Cupid	—N/a	Executive producer	

== Television ==
Television
Year	Title	Role	Notes	Ref
1996	The Big Date	Himself	Contestant	
1997	Ally McBeal	Gorgeous Guy at Bar	Episode: "Compromising Positions"; uncredited	
2000	The Trouble with Normal	Jackson	Episode: "Pilot"	
2000–2001	Providence	Burt Ridley	18 episodes	
2002	Gilmore Girls	Peyton Sanders	Episode: "Eight O'Clock at the Oasis"	
2002–2004	The Division	Inspector Nate Basso	66 episodes	
2005	CSI: Miami	Dr. Brent Kessler	2 episodes	
2005	Point Pleasant	Dr. George Forrester	2 episodes	
2005	Charmed	Jack Brody	Episode: "Ordinary Witches"	
2006	Numbers	Richard Clast	Episode: "Hardball"	
2006	Related	Danny	Episode: "Related"	
2006–2007	The Unit	Wilson James	5 episodes	
2006–2007	What About Brian	Richard Povich	6 episodes	
2007	The Sarah Silverman Program	Cable Guy	Episode: "Muffin' Man"	
2007–2015	Mad Men	Don Draper	Main role	
2008–2025	Saturday Night Live	Himself (host) / various	4 episodes as host, 14 cameos	
2009–2010, 2012	30 Rock	Dr. Drew Baird	7 episodes	
2010, 2026	The Simpsons	FBI Investigator / Himself (voice)	Episodes: "Donnie Fatso", "Extreme Makeover: Homer Edition"	
2010, 2012	Conan	Himself	2 episodes	
2010–2016	Childrens Hospital	Derrick Childrens / Arthur Childrens	6 episodes	
2011	Robot Chicken	Various voices	2 episodes	
2012	The Increasingly Poor Decisions of Todd Margaret	Himself	5 episodes	
2012	Comedy Bang! Bang!	Himself	Episode: "Jon Hamm Wears A Light Blue Shirt & Silver Watch"	
2012	Martha Speaks	Ham Johnson (voice)	Episode: "Cora! Cora! Cora!/Cora Encore!"	
2012	Metalocalypse	Sultan Sotajumala (voice)	Episode: "Writersklok"	
2012	Family Guy	Himself (voice)	Episode: "Ratings Guy"	
2012	American Dad!	Himself (voice)	Episode: "Can I Be Frank (With You)"	
2012–2013	The Greatest Event in Television History	Ghost of Jon Hamm / Rick Simon	2 episodes	
2012–2013	A Young Doctor's Notebook	Older Doctor	8 episodes; also executive producer	
2013	Bob's Burgers	O.T. (voice)	Episode: "O.T.: The Outside Toilet"	
2013	Archer	Captain Murphy (voice)	2 episodes	
2013	2013 ESPY Awards	Himself (host)	Television special	
2013	Clear History	Will Haney	Television film	
2014	Web Therapy	Jeb Masters	2 episodes	
2014	Black Mirror	Matt Trent	Episode: "White Christmas"	
2014–2015	Parks and Recreation	Ed	2 episodes	
2015–2020	Unbreakable Kimmy Schmidt	Richard Wayne Gary Wayne	14 episodes	
2015	7 Days in Hell	Narrator	Television film	
2015	Wet Hot American Summer: First Day of Camp	Falcon	4 episodes	
2015	Toast of London	Himself	Episode: "Hamm on Toast"	
2015–2016	TripTank	Various characters	8 episodes	
2016	Wander Over Yonder	Cartoon Lord Hater (voice)	Episode: "The Cartoon"	
2016	Angie Tribeca	McCormick	Episode: "Fleas Don't Kill Me"	
2016	The Last Man on Earth	Darrell	Episode: "General Breast Theme with Cobras"	
2016–2018	The Amazing Gayl Pile	C.A.M. (voice)	8 episodes	
2017	SpongeBob SquarePants	Don Grouper (voice)	Episode: "Goodbye, Krabby Patty?"	
2017	Tour de Pharmacy	Narrator	Television film	
2017	Big Mouth	Scallops (voice)	Episode: "I Survived Jessi's Bat Mitzvah"	
2017	Travel Man	Himself	Christmas Special	
2018	Legion	Narrator	7 episodes	
2018	Barry	Himself	Episode: "Chapter Four: Commit... to YOU"	
2018	Random Acts of Flyness	Himself	Episode: "What are your thoughts on raising free black children?"	
2018	I Love You, America with Sarah Silverman	Abraham Lincoln	Episode: "Hall of Presidents"	
2018	Big City Greens	Louis (voice)	Episode: "Big Deal"	
2019–2023	Good Omens	Archangel Gabriel	10 episodes	
2020	Home Movie: The Princess Bride	Westley	Episode: "Chapter Four: Battle of the Wits"	
2020	Sarah Cooper: Everything's Fine	Steve Windell	Television special	
2020–2021	Curb Your Enthusiasm	Himself	2 episodes	
2020–2021	Bless the Harts	Mayor Webb (voice)	6 episodes	
2021	Invincible	Steve (voice)	2 episodes	
2021	M.O.D.O.K.	Iron Man (voice)	4 episodes	
2023	The Eric Andre Show	Himself	Episode: "Rim the Reaper"	
2023–present	The Morning Show	Paul Marks	13 episodes	
2023–2024	Fargo	Sheriff Roy Tillman	10 episodes	
2024	The Great North	Beef's Heart / Dennis (voice)	2 episodes	
2024–present	Grimsburg	Det. Marvin Flute (voice)	Main role; also executive producer	
2024–2025	Landman	Monty Miller	10 episodes	
2025–present	Your Friends & Neighbors	Andrew Cooper	Main role; also executive producer	
2026	15th NFL Honors	Himself (host)	Television special	
2026	Life, Larry and the Pursuit of Unhappiness	Orville Wright	Episode: "McCarthy"	
2026	American Hostage	Fred Heckman	8 episodes; also executive producer	

== Music videos ==
Music videos
Year	Artist	Song	Role	Ref
2011	The Lonely Island (ft. Rihanna)	"Shy Ronnie 2: Ronnie & Clyde"	Bank Hostage	
2011	Herman Düne	"Tell Me Something I Don't Know"	Cadillac driver	
2012	Aimee Mann	"Labrador"	Tom Scharpling	
2020	Eels	"Are We Alright Again"	Man being burgled	
2021	George Harrison	"My Sweet Lord"	Himself	

== Audiobooks ==
Audiobooks
Year	Title	Role	Author	Ref
2017	Star Wars: From a Certain Point of View	Boba Fett	Paul Dini	
2020	Star Wars: From a Certain Point of View: The Empire Strikes Back	Boba Fett	Zoraida Córdova	
2023	Star Wars: From a Certain Point of View: Return of the Jedi	Boba Fett	Tara Sim	

== Podcasts ==
Audiobooks
Year	Title	Role	Author	Ref
2022	American Hostage	Fred Heckman	Shawn Christensen	
