= Peter Craig =

American novelist and screenwriter

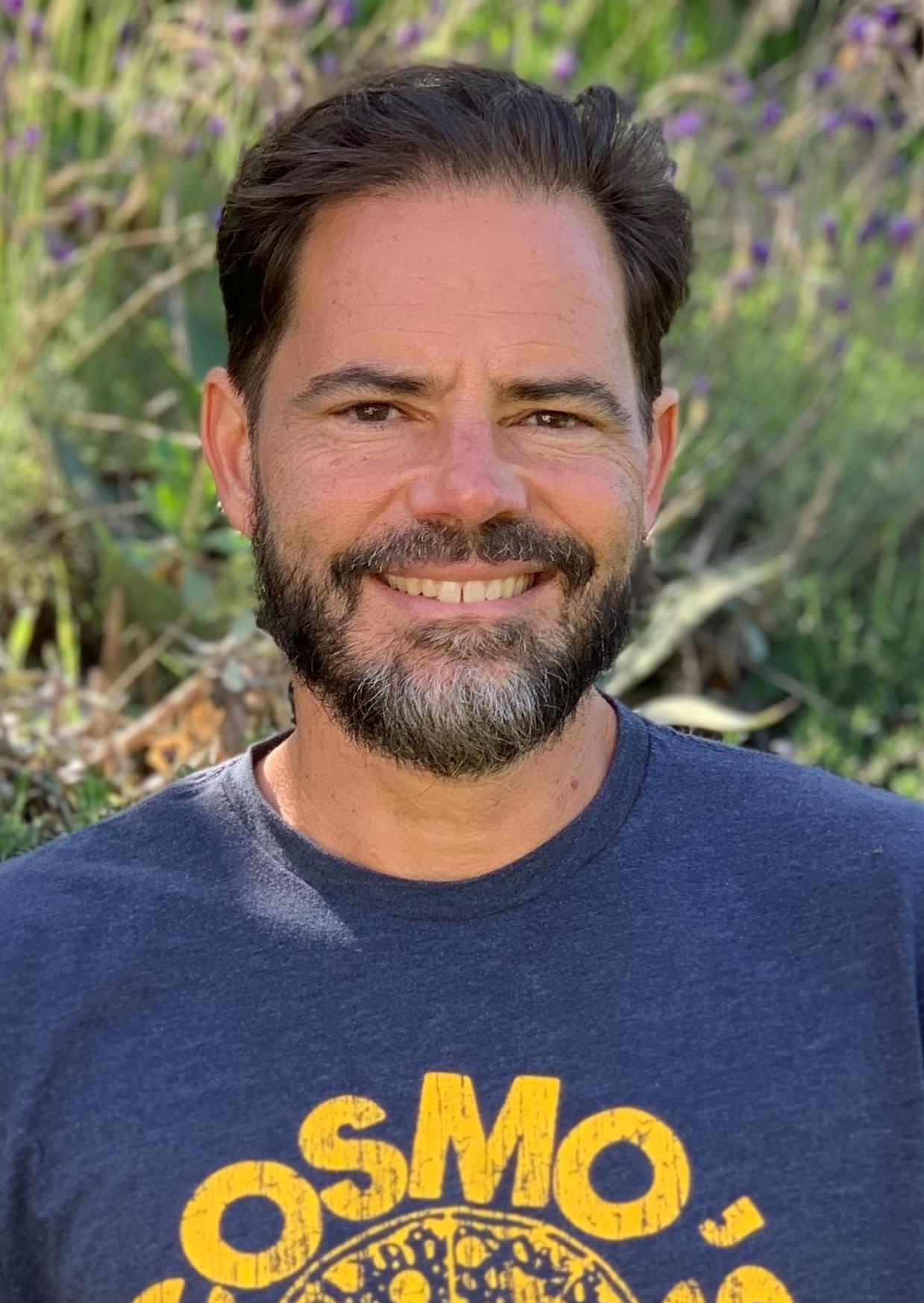
- Craig in 2021
- Born: November 10, 1969 (age 56); Los Angeles, California, U.S.
- Education: Iowa Writers' Workshop
- Occupations: Novelist; screenwriter
- Spouse: Amy Scattergood (m. 1995; div. 2005) Jennifer DeFrancisco (m. 2008; div. 2017) Cristina Esposito (m. 2023)
- Children: 3
- Parent: Sally Field (mother)
- Relatives: Eli Craig (brother); Margaret Field (grandmother); Richard D. Field (uncle)

Peter Craig (born November 10, 1969) is an American novelist and screenwriter. He is best known for co-writing the screenplays to The Town (2010), The Batman (2022), and Top Gun: Maverick (2022), earning an Academy Award nomination for the last. He received the 2026 Primetime Emmy Award for Outstanding Movie for his work on Remarkably Bright Creatures.

== Early life ==
Craig grew up in Southern California and Oregon. He is one of two children of Steve Craig and actress Sally Field, since divorced. Craig's brother, Eli Craig, is a film director. Peter Craig attended the Iowa Writers' Workshop at the University of Iowa and studied under authors Tobias Wolff and Marilynne Robinson.

== Career ==
As a novelist, Craig has written The Martini Shot, Hot Plastic, and Blood Father.

As a screenwriter, Craig debuted with The Town (2010), based on the novel Prince of Thieves by Chuck Hogan, co-writing it with Ben Affleck and Aaron Stockard. He then adapted the screenplays for The Hunger Games: Mockingjay – Part 1 and Part 2 with Danny Strong. In 2016, Craig adapted his own novel, Blood Father, into a film of the same name directed by Jean-François Richet, and then adapted the novel Horse Soldiers, Doug Stanton's nonfiction account of the war in Afghanistan, into the film 12 Strong (2018). In 2021, he wrote the sequel Bad Boys for Life, with Chris Bremner and Joe Carnahan.

In 2022, Craig co-wrote the screenplay Top Gun: Maverick with Justin Marks, Christopher McQuarrie, Ehren Kruger, and Eric Warren Singer, which earned him a nomination for the Academy Award for Best Adapted Screenplay. That same year he co-wrote the screenplay for The Batman with director Matt Reeves.

Craig also co-wrote the screenplay for The Mother with Andrea Berloff and Misha Green. Directed by Niki Caro, that film is scheduled for release on Netflix on May 12, 2023. Craig has been nominated for two Writers Guild of America Awards and a Critics' Choice Movie Award for Best Adapted Screenplay.

== Personal life ==
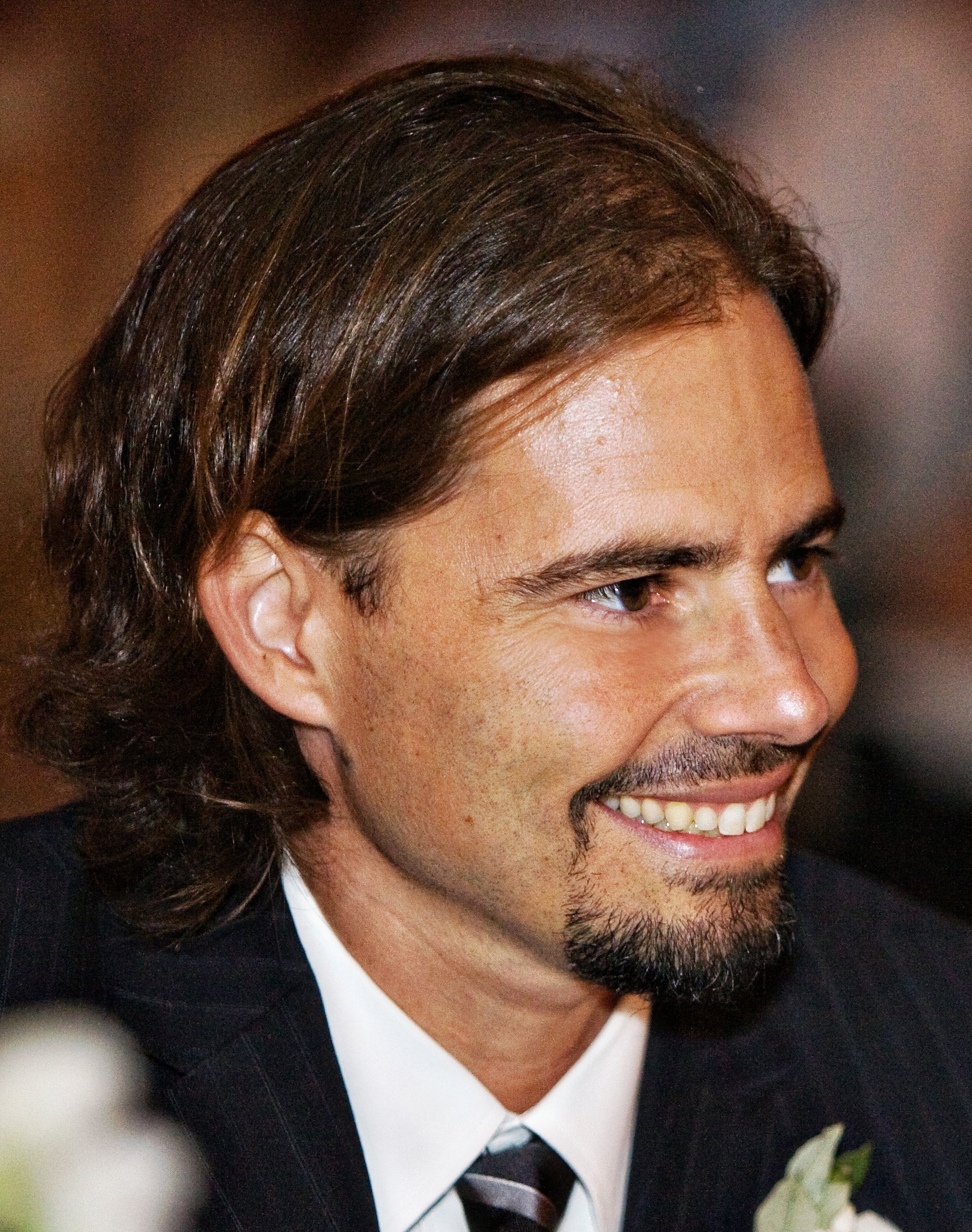
Craig in 2012

Craig has been married three times and divorced twice: first to Amy Scattergood, the Los Angeles Times food writer, and then to Jennifer DeFrancisco. He has two daughters with Scattergood, and a son with DeFrancisco. He is currently married to Cristina Esposito whom he wed in 2023, a teacher.

== Filmography ==
=== Feature films ===
Year	Title	Writer	Producer	Notes
2010	The Town	Yes	No	
2014	The Hunger Games: Mockingjay – Part 1	Yes	No	
2015	The Hunger Games: Mockingjay – Part 2	Yes	No	
2016	Blood Father	Yes	Yes	
2018	12 Strong	Yes	No	
2020	Bad Boys for Life	Yes	No	
2021	The Unforgivable	Yes	No	
2022	The Batman	Yes	No	
2022	Top Gun: Maverick	Story	No	
2023	The Mother	Yes	No	
2024	Gladiator II	Story	No	
2026	Remarkably Bright Creatures	No	Yes	

=== Television ===
Year	Title	Writer	Executive producer	Notes
2025	Dope Thief	Yes	Yes	Also showrunner; also director, Episode: "Innocent People"
2027	Rabbit, Rabbit	Yes	Yes	Also showrunner

=== Acting credits ===
Year	Title	Role
1978	Hooper	Pete
1988	Satisfaction	Mig

== Novels ==
- The Martini Shot (William Morrow, 1998)
- Hot Plastic (Hyperion, 2004); (Hachette Book Group USA, 2015)
- Blood Father (Hyperion, 2005); (Hachette Book Group USA, 2015)
