= Samuel Beckwith =

Telegraph and cipher officer to Ulysses S. Grant. (1837–1916)

Captain Samuel H. Beckwith
- Born: Samuel Horace Beckwith; December 18, 1837; Madison, New York, US
- Died: December 6, 1916 (aged 78); Hampton, Virginia, US
- Military career
- Allegiance: United States
- Branch: United States Army
- Service years: 1862-1866
- Rank: Captain
- Nickname: Grant's Shadow
- Unit: 11th New York Infantry
- Conflicts: Civil War

Captain Samuel H. Beckwith (December 18, 1837 – December 6, 1916) was a telegraph and cipher officer to Ulysses S. Grant. He was nicknamed "Grant's Shadow" by other staff officers. Beckwith was the first to transmit news of John Wilkes Booth's whereabouts after Lincoln's assassination, leading to Booth's capture. Beckwith was also present as Grant's telegraph officer on Abraham Lincoln's visits.

In Washington, Lincoln used to daily visit the telegraph office, and cipher operator David Homer Bates was later to recall these visits, along with the testimony of Thomas T. Eckert, Charles A. Tinker, Albert B. Chandler, and Albert E. H. Johnson in Lincoln in the Telegraph Office (1907).

== Popular culture ==
In the 2012 film Lincoln, the character of the Washington war-room telegraph officer is credited as Grant's officer "Samuel Beckwith" but appears to be based on the memoirs of Washington cipher officer David Homer Bates. He was played by Adam Driver.

Beckwith is a point-of-view character in Winfield Taylor's 2026 alternative historical fiction novel, So Mad a Thought: A Lincoln and Grant Adventure.
