= Adam Driver =

American actor (born 1983)

- Driver at the 2026 New York Film Festival
- Born: Adam Douglas Driver; November 19, 1983 (age 43); Fontana, California, U.S.
- Education: University of Indianapolis; Juilliard School (BFA)
- Occupation: Actor
- Years active: 2009–present
- Spouse: Joanne Tucker (m. 2013)
- Children: 2
- Awards: Full list
- Military career
- Allegiance: United States
- Branch: United States Marine Corps
- Service years: 2001–2004
- Rank: Lance corporal
- Unit: 1st Battalion, 1st Marines

Adam Douglas Driver (born November 19, 1983) is an American actor. His breakout performance as Adam Sackler in the HBO television series Girls (2012–2017) earned him three consecutive Primetime Emmy nominations. Driver played supporting roles in Lincoln (2012), Frances Ha (2012), Inside Llewyn Davis (2013), and While We're Young (2014), before gaining more extensive recognition for his portrayal of Kylo Ren in the Star Wars sequel trilogy (2015–2019).

He won the Volpi Cup for Best Actor for a leading role in Hungry Hearts (2014) and received consecutive Academy Award nominations for Best Supporting Actor for portraying Detective Philip "Flip" Zimmerman in BlacKkKlansman (2018) as well as Best Actor for his role as Charlie Barber in Marriage Story (2019). Driver garnered further acclaim for portraying the titular character in Paterson (2016), Father Francisco Garupe in Silence (2016), Jacques le Gris in The Last Duel (2021), and Enzo Ferrari in Ferrari (2023). He has also acted in films such as Logan Lucky (2017), The Report (2019), Annette (2021), House of Gucci (2021), Megalopolis (2024), and Paper Tiger (2026).

On stage, Driver made his Broadway debut in the George Bernard Shaw play Mrs. Warren's Profession (2010) and subsequently acted in the dramas Man and Boy (2011) and Burn This (2019), the latter earned him a nomination for the Tony Award for Best Actor in a Play. He also earned praise for playing a country music singer in the off-Broadway revival of the Kenneth Lonergan play Hold On to Me Darling (2024).

Driver is a veteran of the U.S. Marine Corps. He helped start Arts in the Armed Forces, a nonprofit arts group for military communities. The nonprofit provided arts programming to military communities until dissolving in 2023.

== Early life, education, and military service ==
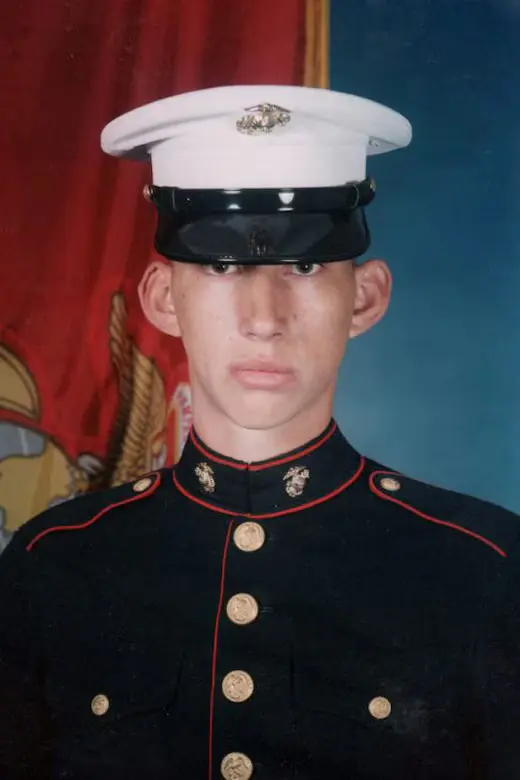
Driver while a U.S. Marine

Adam Douglas Driver was born on November 19, 1983, in Fontana, California, east of Los Angeles, to Nancy Wright (née Needham), a paralegal, and Joe Douglas Driver. His father's family is from Arkansas, and his mother's family is from Indiana. His family moved to San Diego, where Driver spent time with them until he was seven years old.

After his parents divorced, Driver and his mother moved to Mishawaka, Indiana, where he was primarily raised by his stepfather, Rodney G. Wright, a Baptist minister. Driver graduated from Mishawaka High School in 2001, while spending time with his older sister and mother in their hometown. Driver was raised Baptist, and sang in the choir at church.

Driver has described his teenage self as a "misfit"; he told M Magazine that he climbed radio towers, set objects on fire, and co-founded a fight club with friends, inspired by the 1999 film Fight Club. Throughout high school, he was active in choir and theater, participating in school productions of How to Succeed in Business Without Really Trying, Into the Woods, and Guys and Dolls.

He applied to Juilliard School for drama knowing that they would not look at his grades from high school, but was not accepted. After high school, he worked as a door-to-door salesman selling Kirby vacuum cleaners, a telemarketer for a basement waterproofing company, and Ben Franklin Construction.

When Driver was eighteen, he attempted to start his acting career in Los Angeles, leaving Indiana by car until breaking down in Amarillo, Texas. He spent money repairing his car only to make it to Santa Monica, California, where he lived in a hostel for two days and was scammed by a real estate agent he paid to find him an apartment. He realized he did not have enough money to live, and returned to Indiana after only a week away from home.

Shortly after the September 11 attacks, Driver enlisted in the United States Marine Corps. He was assigned to Weapons Company, 1st Battalion, 1st Marines, as an 81mm mortar man. He served for two years and eight months, before fracturing his sternum while riding his mountain bike.

Subsequently, Driver attended the University of Indianapolis for a year before auditioning again for Juilliard, this time succeeding. He got the news he was accepted while at work at the Target Distribution Center in Indianapolis. Driver has said that his Juilliard classmates saw him as an intimidating and volatile figure as he struggled to fit into a lifestyle so different from the Marines. He was a member of the Drama Division's Group 38 from 2005 to 2009, where he met his future wife, Joanne Tucker. He graduated with a Bachelor of Fine Arts in 2009.

== Career ==
=== 2009–2014: Early work and breakout with Girls ===
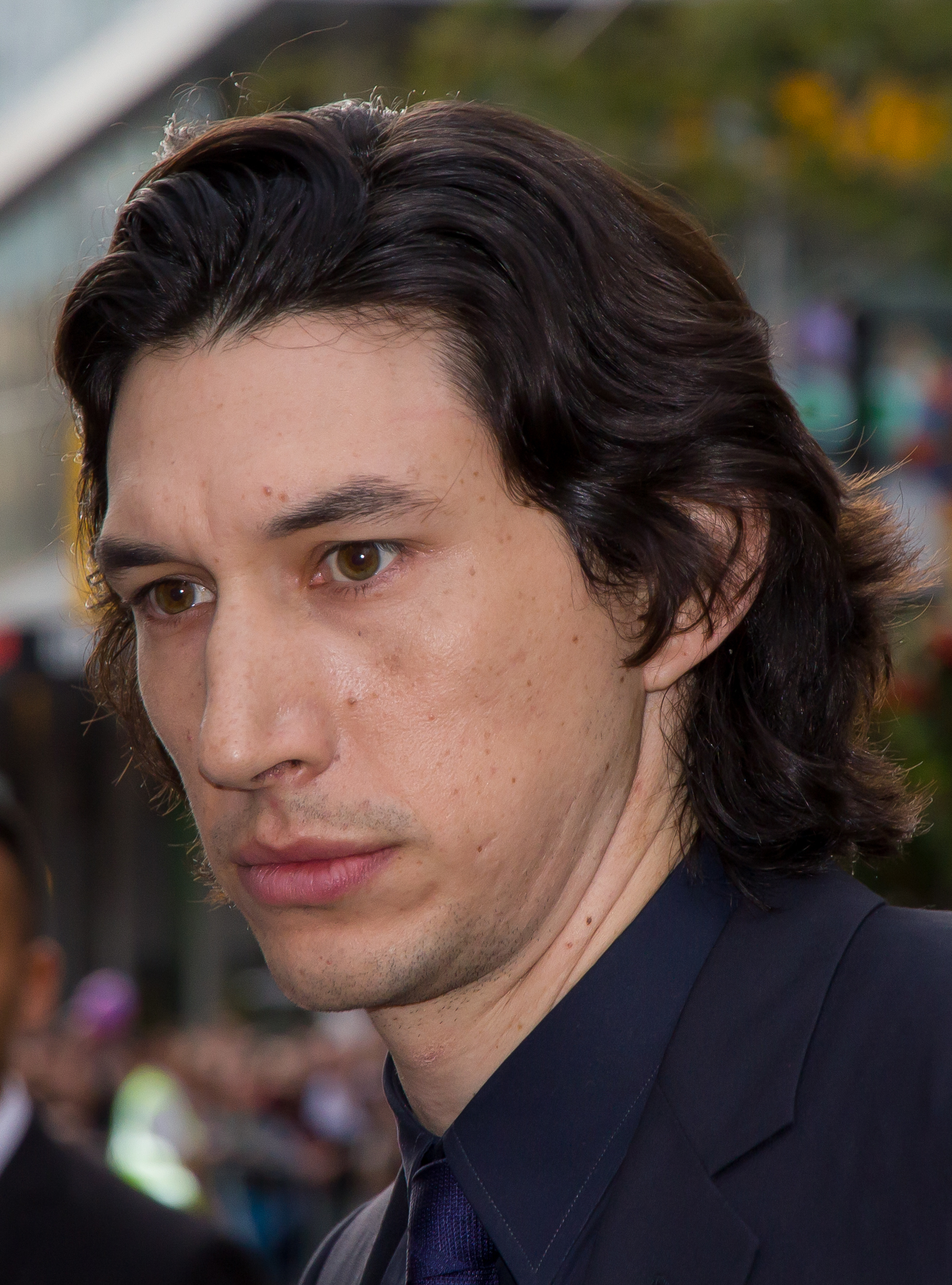
Driver in September 2014

After graduating from Juilliard, Driver appeared in both Broadway and off-Broadway productions. Like many aspiring actors, he occasionally worked as a busboy and waiter. Driver appeared in several television series and short films. He played a repentant witness and reluctant accomplice to an unsolved assault in the final episode of the television series The Unusuals. He made his film debut in Clint Eastwood's biographical film J. Edgar.

In 2012, Driver starred in the HBO comedy-drama series Girls, as the emotionally unstable boyfriend of a writer (Lena Dunham). He received three nominations for the Primetime Emmy Award for Outstanding Supporting Actor in a Comedy Series for his role. Driver played telegraph and cipher officer Samuel Beckwith in Steven Spielberg's historical drama Lincoln, and Lev Shapiro in Noah Baumbach's comedy-drama Frances Ha. He starred in the drama Not Waving But Drowning and the romantic-comedy Gayby. He garnered major off-Broadway recognition for playing Cliff, a working-class Welsh houseguest in Look Back in Anger, and won the Lucille Lortel Award for Outstanding Featured Actor in a Play.

In 2013, Driver appeared in the drama Bluebird and the romantic-comedy What If. He played a musician in the Coen Brothers' black comedy Inside Llewyn Davis, and photographer Rick Smolan in the drama Tracks. In 2014, he played a despairing father in the drama Hungry Hearts, an aspiring filmmaker in Noah Baumbach's comedy While We're Young, and the black sheep of a dysfunctional Jewish family in the comedy-drama This Is Where I Leave You. For his performance in Hungry Hearts, Driver won the Volpi Cup for Best Actor at the 71st Venice International Film Festival. For Vogue's September 2013 issue, Driver appeared alongside Canadian model Daria Werbowy set in Ireland, photographed by Annie Leibovitz.

=== 2015–2019: Worldwide recognition ===
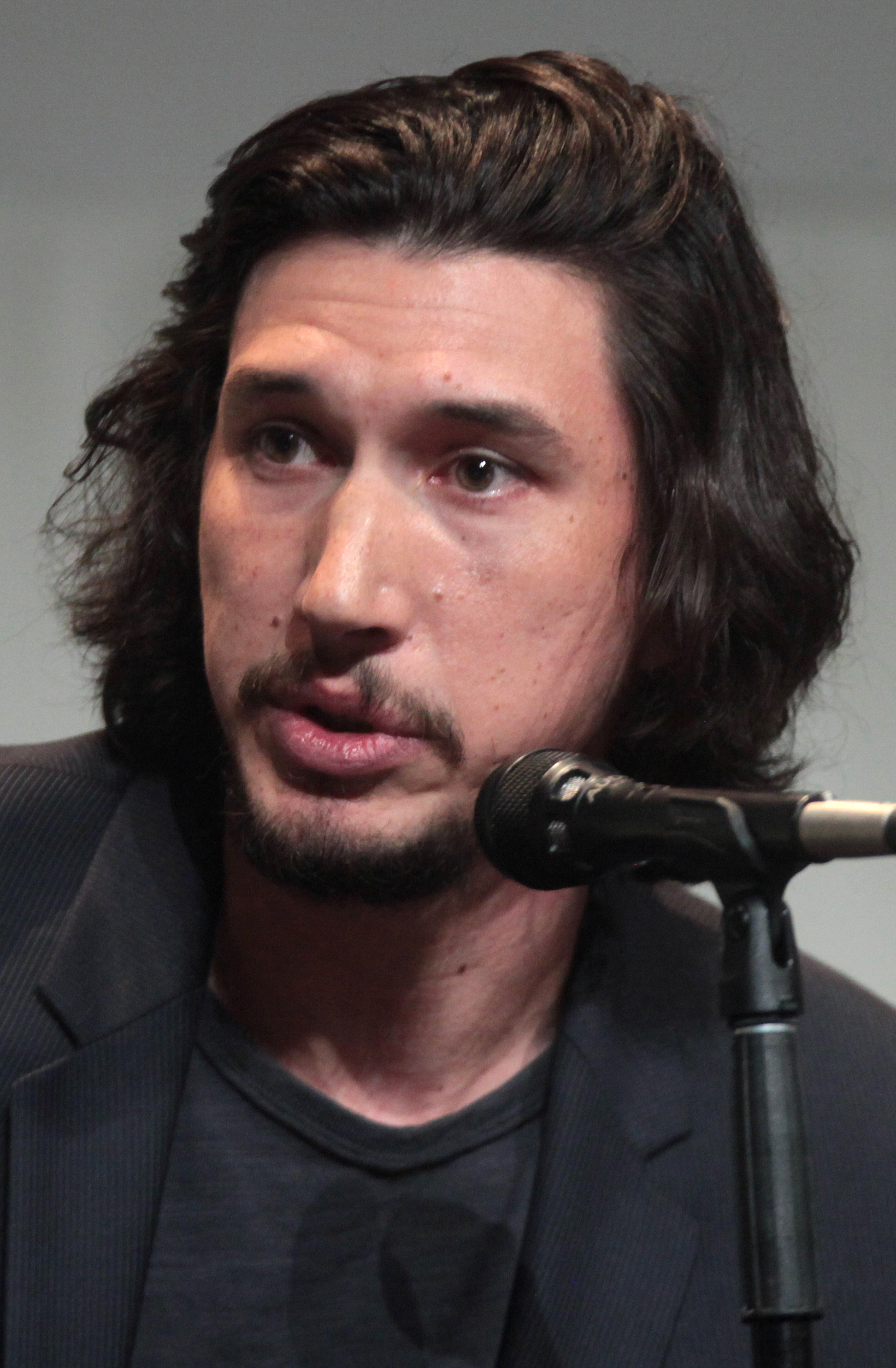
Driver in July 2015

In early 2014, Driver was cast as villain Kylo Ren in Star Wars: The Force Awakens (2015). It was released on December 18, 2015, to commercial and critical success. He reprised the role in The Last Jedi (2017) and The Rise of Skywalker (2019). His performance was positively received; David Edelstein of Vulture wrote, "the core of The Last Jedi—of this whole trilogy, it seems—is Driver's Kylo Ren, who ranks with cinema's most fascinating human monsters."

Peter Bradshaw of The Guardian highlighted Driver's performance in his review of The Force Awakens, calling him "gorgeously cruel, spiteful and capricious ... very suited to Kylo Ren's fastidious and amused contempt for his enemies' weakness and compassion." After the trilogies' conclusion, Driver sought to continue portraying the character in a spin off film titled The Hunt For Ben Solo, with a screenplay by Steven Soderbergh, but Disney Studios rejected the script.

Driver had a supporting role in Jeff Nichols' science fiction film Midnight Special, which was released on March 18, 2016. He played a 17th-century Portuguese Jesuit priest in Martin Scorsese's historical film Silence (2016). While filming, Driver lost almost 50 pounds. In Jim Jarmusch's drama film Paterson, Driver played the title character, a bus driver who writes poetry. It premiered at the 69th Cannes Film Festival and was released on December 28, 2016. Driver's performance was acclaimed and he received multiple nominations for Best Actor from critics' associations, winning several, including the Los Angeles Film Critics Association Award for Best Actor. Peter Travers of Rolling Stone wrote "Driver's indelibly moving portrayal is so lived-in and lyrical you hardly recognize it as acting." Paterson was included in many critics' top ten lists of best films of 2016.

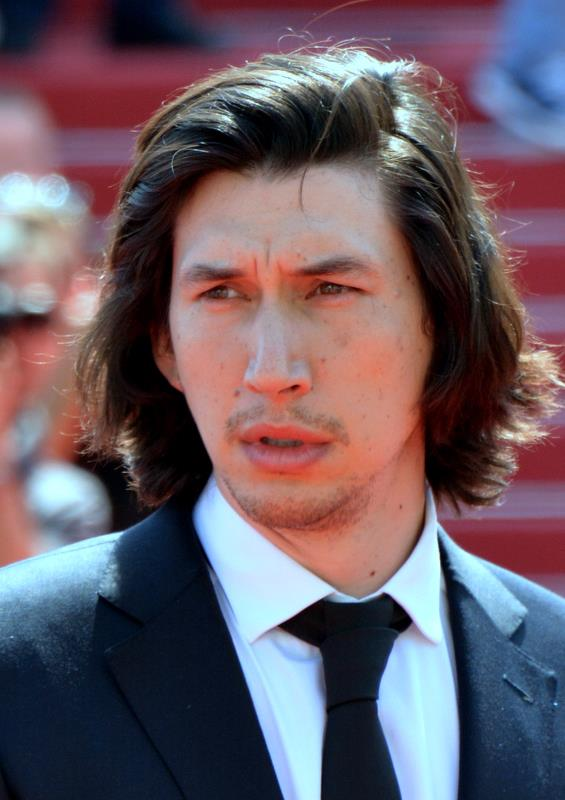
Driver in May 2016

In 2017, Driver appeared briefly in Noah Baumbach's The Meyerowitz Stories, making his third appearance in one of their films. It premiered at the 70th Cannes Film Festival and was released on October 13, 2017. He played Clyde, a one-armed Iraq War veteran, in Steven Soderbergh's Logan Lucky, which was released on August 18, 2017. Driver played a Jewish police detective, who infiltrates the Ku Klux Klan in Spike Lee's comedy-drama BlacKkKlansman. It premiered at 71st Cannes Film Festival and was released on August 10, 2018. Critics praised his performance in the film and was nominated for the Academy Award for Best Supporting Actor and the Golden Globe Award for Best Supporting Actor. Driver played Toby Grummett in Terry Gilliam's adventure-comedy film The Man Who Killed Don Quixote (2018), which also premiered at Cannes.

In 2019, Driver played Daniel J. Jones in Scott Z. Burns' political drama The Report, which premiered at the Sundance Film Festival in Utah. The same year, Driver returned to Broadway to play Pale against Keri Russell in Michael Mayer's directed 2019 production of Lanford Wilson's Burn This, receiving acclaim for his explosive performance and a nomination for the Tony Award for Best Actor in a Play. He was part of the ensemble cast for Jim Jarmusch's zombie film The Dead Don't Die, which premiered at the 72nd Cannes Film Festival and was released on June 14, 2019. The same year, Driver starred opposite Scarlett Johansson in Noah Baumbach's Marriage Story, which premiered at the 76th Venice International Film Festival. Reviewing the film in The Hollywood Reporter, critic Jon Frosch noted that Driver "delivers a brilliantly inhabited and shaded portrait" of a man undergoing a divorce. For his performance, he received nominations for the Academy Award for Best Actor, BAFTA Award for Best Actor in a Leading Role, and the Golden Globe Award for Best Actor – Motion Picture Drama.

=== 2020–present ===
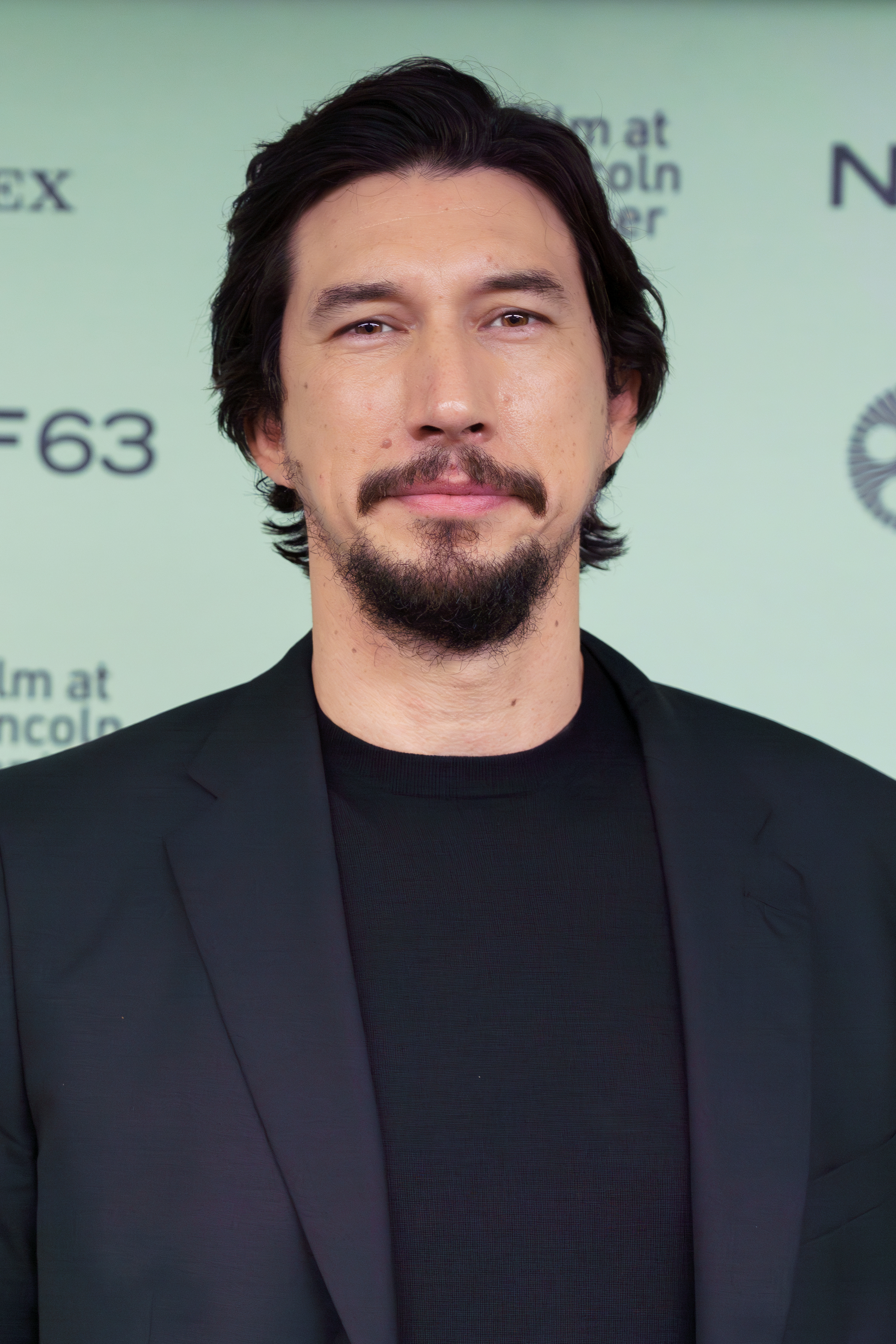
Driver in 2025

On January 25, 2020, Driver returned to host Saturday Night Live for the third time with musical guest Halsey. In 2020, Driver became the subject of a running gag on Last Week Tonight with John Oliver, in which Oliver expressed several strange masochistic fantasies about Driver, referencing his muscular build and masculine appearance. Driver eventually appeared on the final episode of the season and "demanded an apology". In 2021, he went viral for his shirtless appearance in the advertising campaign for Burberry's masculine fragrance Hero. Driver again returned for the advertising campaign for the eau de parfum concentration of Hero in 2022.

In 2021, Driver starred in Leos Carax's musical film Annette, which premiered at the 74th Cannes Film Festival. He had a leading role in Ridley Scott's historical drama The Last Duel, along with the biopic crime film House of Gucci, which covers the assassination of Maurizio Gucci, and was also directed by Scott.

In 2022, Driver starred in the apocalyptic black comedy film White Noise, which marks his fifth collaboration with Baumbach. Driver starred in the science fiction film 65 and is scheduled to star in Jeff Nichols' historical film Yankee Commandante. Driver played Enzo Ferrari in Michael Mann's biopic film Ferrari. In May 2023, it was announced that Driver would be an honorary starter for the 107th running of the Indianapolis 500 auto race. On December 9, 2023, Driver hosted Saturday Night Live for the fourth time with musical guest Olivia Rodrigo.

Driver starred in Francis Ford Coppola's allegorical epic Megalopolis (2024). The film premiered at the Cannes Film Festival where it competed for the Palme d'Or and polarized critics. In 2024, it was announced that Driver would return to the off Broadway stage playing fictional country music star Strings McCrane in the Kenneth Lonergan play Hold On to Me Darling at the Lucille Lortel Theater with performances starting in September. Driver's performance received critical acclaim with Robert Hoffer for The Wrap, considering McCrane to be the best role for Driver. For his performance, Driver received nominations for the Drama Desk Award, Drama League Award and Outer Critics Circle Award for Outstanding Actor in a Play. In 2025, he starred in Jim Jarmusch's anthology comedy-drama Father Mother Sister Brother with Cate Blanchett.

In 2026, Driver starred in the James Gray crime drama Paper Tiger alongside Johansson and Miles Teller, the film premiering at the 2026 Cannes Film Festival. He also appeared in Chris Rock's Misty Green.

=== Upcoming projects ===
Driver is next to appear in the Ron Howard war drama Alone at Dawn alongside Anne Hathaway. He's set to play the main antagonist, Otis Wardell, in Heat 2 alongside Leonardo DiCaprio and Christian Bale which is scheduled to start production in December 2026.

In January 2026, it was announced that Driver was cast to play J-Will in Rabbit Rabbit, a Netflix thriller series, alongside Regina Hall.

In August 2026, it was announced that Driver was cast to play Mister Sinister in an untitled X-Men reboot, which has a planned 2028 release.

== Personal life ==
Driver met his longtime girlfriend Joanne Tucker at Juilliard, and they married in June 2013. Tucker is the granddaughter of Bermudian politician Henry Tucker. The couple have a son, born in 2016, whose birth they kept private from the press for two years. Tucker gave birth to their second child, a daughter, in April 2023. They lived in Brooklyn Heights with their children and dog as of 2016. Driver is the founder of Arts in the Armed Forces (AITAF), a nonprofit that performs theater for all branches of the military in the United States and abroad.

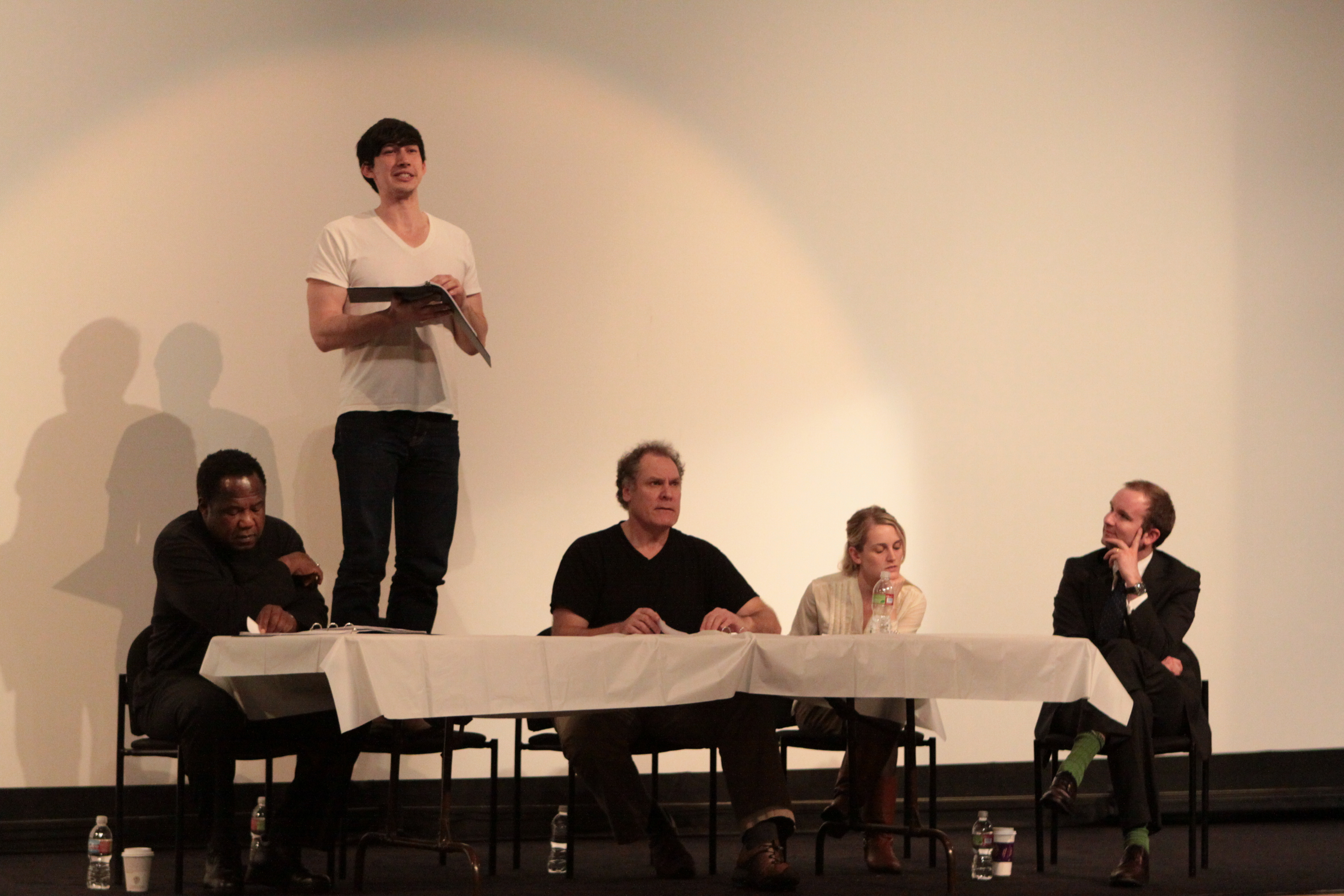
Driver and Tucker with Isiah Whitlock Jr. and Jay O. Sanders at Camp Pendleton in 2008

Driver has said on multiple occasions that he dislikes watching or listening to his own performances, and chose not to continue with a radio interview on NPR's Fresh Air after the host played a clip from Marriage Story. He has said that his usual technique is to leave the theater and "then I go back and, when the lights come up, I stand up. I pretend that I was there the whole time."

== Acting credits ==
=== Film ===
Key
| † | Denotes films that have not yet been released |

| Year | Title | Role | Notes | Ref. |
|---|---|---|---|---|
| 2011 | J. Edgar | Walter Lyle | | |
| 2012 | Gayby | Neil | | |
| 2012 | Not Waving But Drowning | Adam | | |
| 2012 | Frances Ha | Lev Shapiro | | |
| 2012 | Lincoln | Samuel Beckwith | | |
| 2013 | Bluebird | Walter | | |
| 2013 | Inside Llewyn Davis | Al Cody | | |
| 2013 | Tracks | Rick Smolan | | |
| 2013 | The F Word | Allan | | |
| 2014 | Hungry Hearts | Jude | | |
| 2014 | While We're Young | Jamie Massey | | |
| 2014 | This Is Where I Leave You | Phillip Altman | | |
| 2015 | Star Wars: The Force Awakens | Kylo Ren | | |
| 2016 | Midnight Special | Paul Sevier | | |
| 2016 | Paterson | Paterson | | |
| 2016 | Silence | Father Francisco Garupe | | |
| 2017 | The Meyerowitz Stories | Randy | | |
| 2017 | Logan Lucky | Clyde Logan | | |
| 2017 | Star Wars: The Last Jedi | Kylo Ren | | |
| 2018 | BlacKkKlansman | Det. Philip "Flip" Zimmerman | | |
| 2018 | The Man Who Killed Don Quixote | Toby Grummett | | |
| 2019 | The Report | Daniel J. Jones | | |
| 2019 | The Dead Don't Die | Officer Ronald Peterson | | |
| 2019 | Marriage Story | Charlie Barber | | |
| 2019 | Star Wars: The Rise of Skywalker | Kylo Ren / Ben Solo | | |
| 2021 | Annette | Henry McHenry | Also producer | |
| 2021 | The Last Duel | Jacques le Gris | | |
| 2021 | House of Gucci | Maurizio Gucci | | |
| 2022 | White Noise | Jack Gladney | | |
| 2023 | 65 | Commander Mills | | |
| 2023 | Ferrari | Enzo Ferrari | Also executive producer | |
| 2024 | Megalopolis | Cesar Catilina | | |
| 2025 | Father Mother Sister Brother | Jeff | | |
| 2026 | Paper Tiger | Gary Pearl | | |
| 2026 | Misty Green | Zach | | |
| 2027 | Alone at Dawn † | John A. Chapman | Post-production | |

=== Television ===
Key
| † | Denotes television productions that have not yet been released |

| Year | Title | Role | Notes | Ref. |
|---|---|---|---|---|
| 2009 | The Wonderful Maladys | Zed | Unaired pilot | |
| 2009 | The Unusuals | Will Slansky | Episode: "The E.I.D." | |
| 2010 | Law & Order | Robby Vickery | Episode: "Brilliant Disguise" | |
| 2010 | You Don't Know Jack | Glen Stetson | Television film | |
| 2012 | Law & Order: Special Victims Unit | Jason Roberts | Episode: "Theatre Tricks" | |
| 2012–2017 | Girls | Adam Sackler | 49 episodes | |
| 2015 | The Simpsons | Adam Sackler (voice) | Episode: "Every Man's Dream" | |
| 2016–2023 | Saturday Night Live | Himself (host) | Host; 4 episodes | |
| 2017 | Bob's Burgers | Art the Artist (voice) | Two-part episode: "The Bleakening" | |
| 2020 | Last Week Tonight with John Oliver | Himself | 1 episode | |
| TBA | Rabbit, Rabbit † | J-Will | Lead role; also executive producer | |

=== Theater ===
| Year | Title | Role | Venue | Production type | Ref. |
|---|---|---|---|---|---|
| 2009 | Slipping | Chris | Rattlestick Playwrights Theater | Off-Broadway | |
| 2009 | The Retributionists | Dov Kaplinsky | Playwrights Horizons | Off-Broadway | |
| 2010 | Little Doc | Ric | Rattlestick Playwrights Theater | Off-Broadway | |
| 2010 | The Forest | Bulanov | East 13th Street Theater | Off-Broadway | |
| 2010 | Mrs. Warren's Profession | Frank Gardner | American Airlines Theatre | Broadway | |
| 2010–2011 | Angels in America | Louis Ironson | Signature Theatre Company | Off-Broadway | |
| 2011 | Man and Boy | Basil Anthony | American Airlines Theatre | Broadway | |
| 2012 | Look Back in Anger | Cliff Lewis | Roundabout Theatre Company | Off-Broadway | |
| 2019 | Burn This | Pale | Hudson Theatre | Broadway | |
| 2024 | Hold On to Me Darling | Strings McCrane | Lucille Lortel Theatre | Off-Broadway | |

=== Video games ===
| Year | Title | Voice role |
|---|---|---|
| 2015 | Disney Infinity 3.0 | Kylo Ren |
| 2016 | Lego Star Wars: The Force Awakens | Kylo Ren |

=== Theme parks ===
| Year | Title | Role | Venue |
|---|---|---|---|
| 2019–2020 | Star Wars: Rise of the Resistance | Kylo Ren | Disneyland / Disney's Hollywood Studios |

== Awards and nominations ==
For his work on television, Driver has received four Primetime Emmy Award nominations. He received three nominations for his performance in Girls, from 2013, 2014 and 2015, in the Outstanding Supporting Actor in a Comedy Series category. In 2020, he also received a nomination for Outstanding Guest Actor in a Comedy Series for his guest hosting role on Saturday Night Live. For his work in films, he has been nominated twice for an Academy Award, for his performances in BlacKkKlansman (2018) and Marriage Story (2019). He also received Actor Award, BAFTA Award, and Golden Globe Award nominations for those films. He also received an Actor Award nomination for Outstanding Performance by a Cast in a Motion Picture as a part of the ensemble of Steven Spielberg's Lincoln. In 2019, Driver was nominated for the Tony Award for Best Lead Actor in a Play for his performance in Burn This.
