= Boston Society of Film Critics Awards 2016 =

Annual US film awards ceremony

37th BSFC Awards

December 11, 2016

Best Film:
La La Land

The 37th Boston Society of Film Critics Awards, honoring the best in filmmaking in 2016, were given on December 11, 2016.

== Winners ==
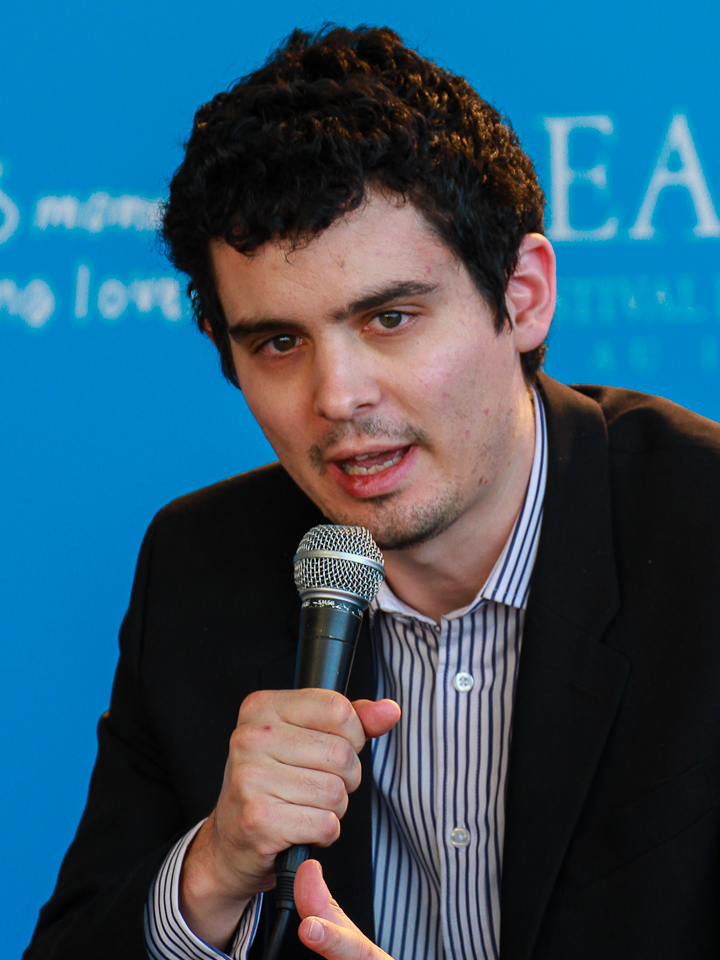
Damien Chazelle, Best Director winner

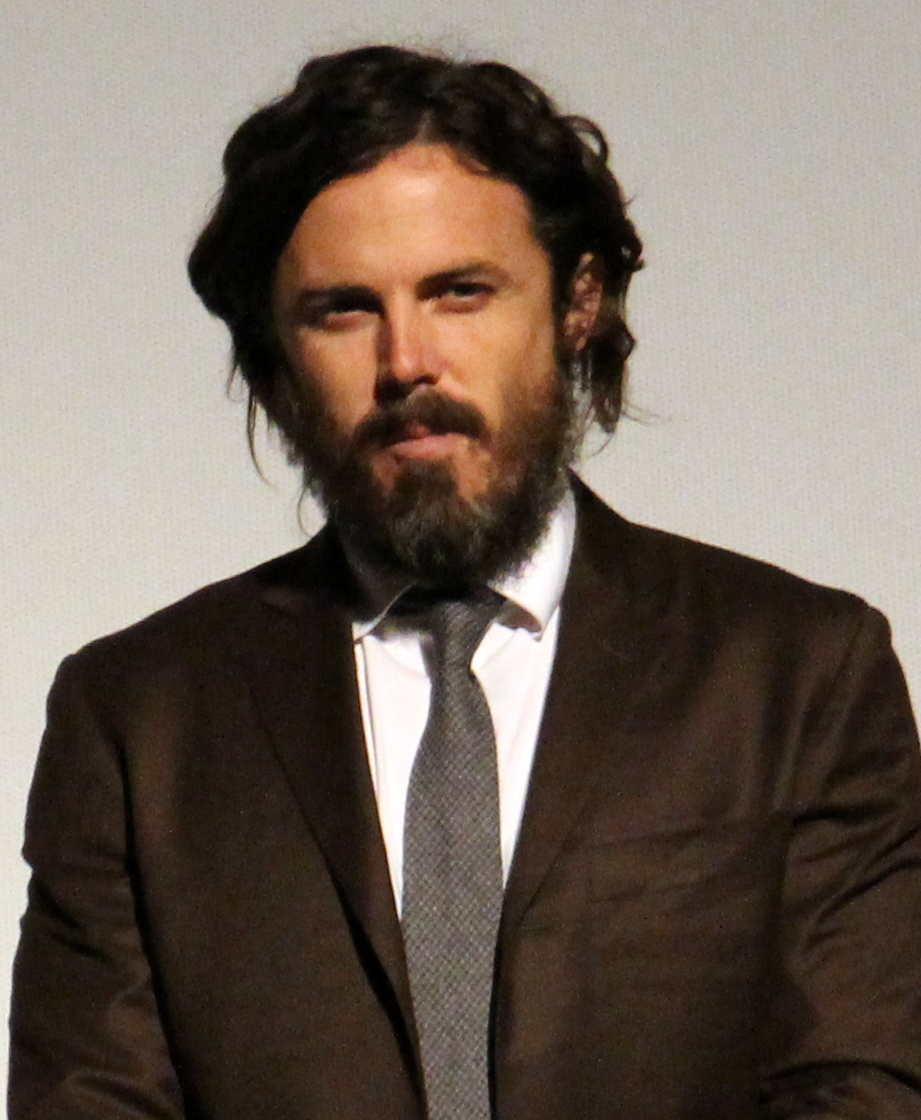
Casey Affleck, Best Actor winner

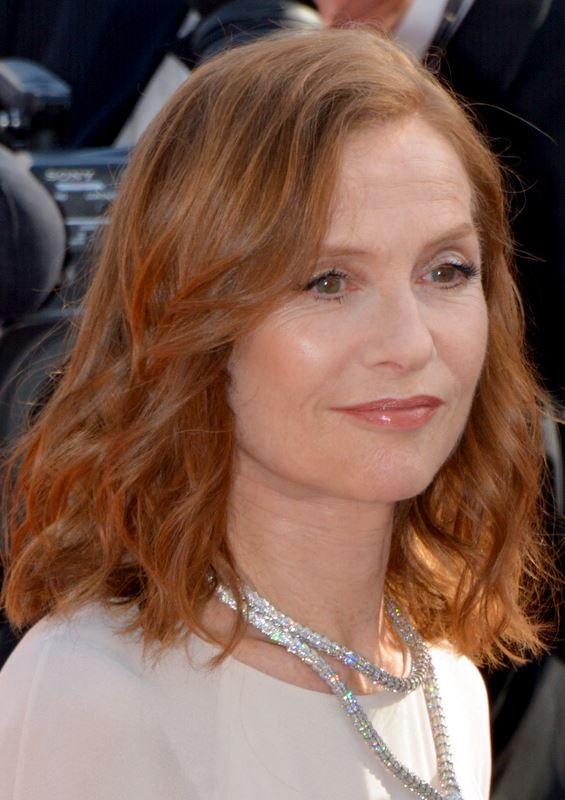
Isabelle Huppert, Best Actress winner

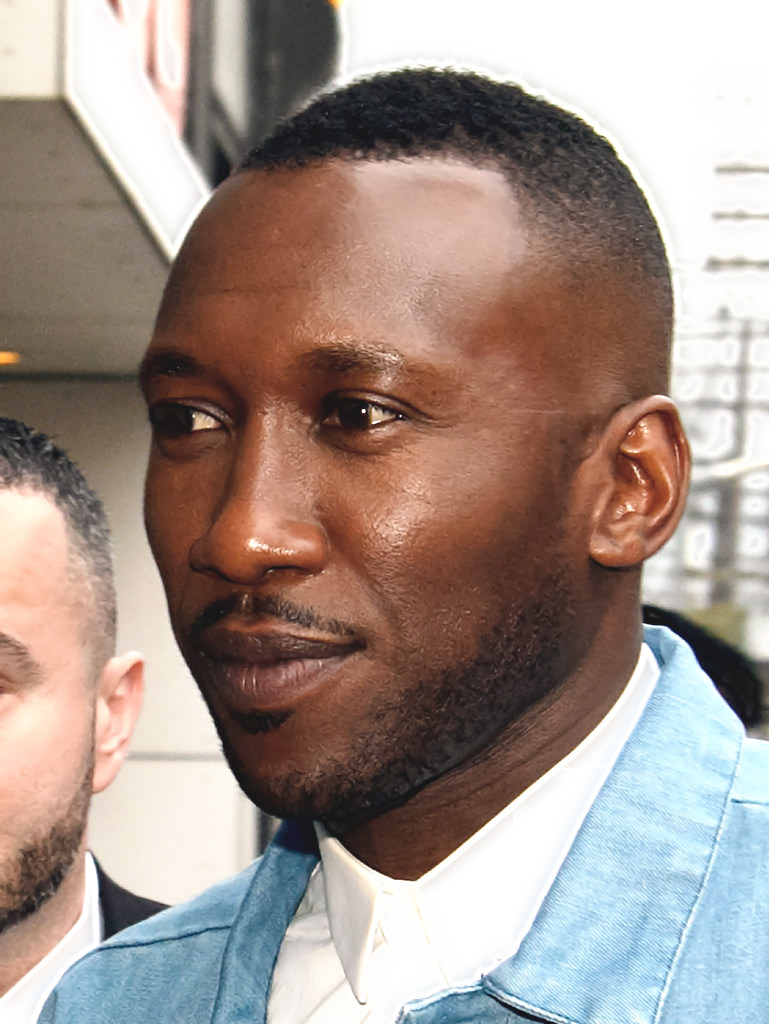
Mahershala Ali, Best Supporting Actor winner

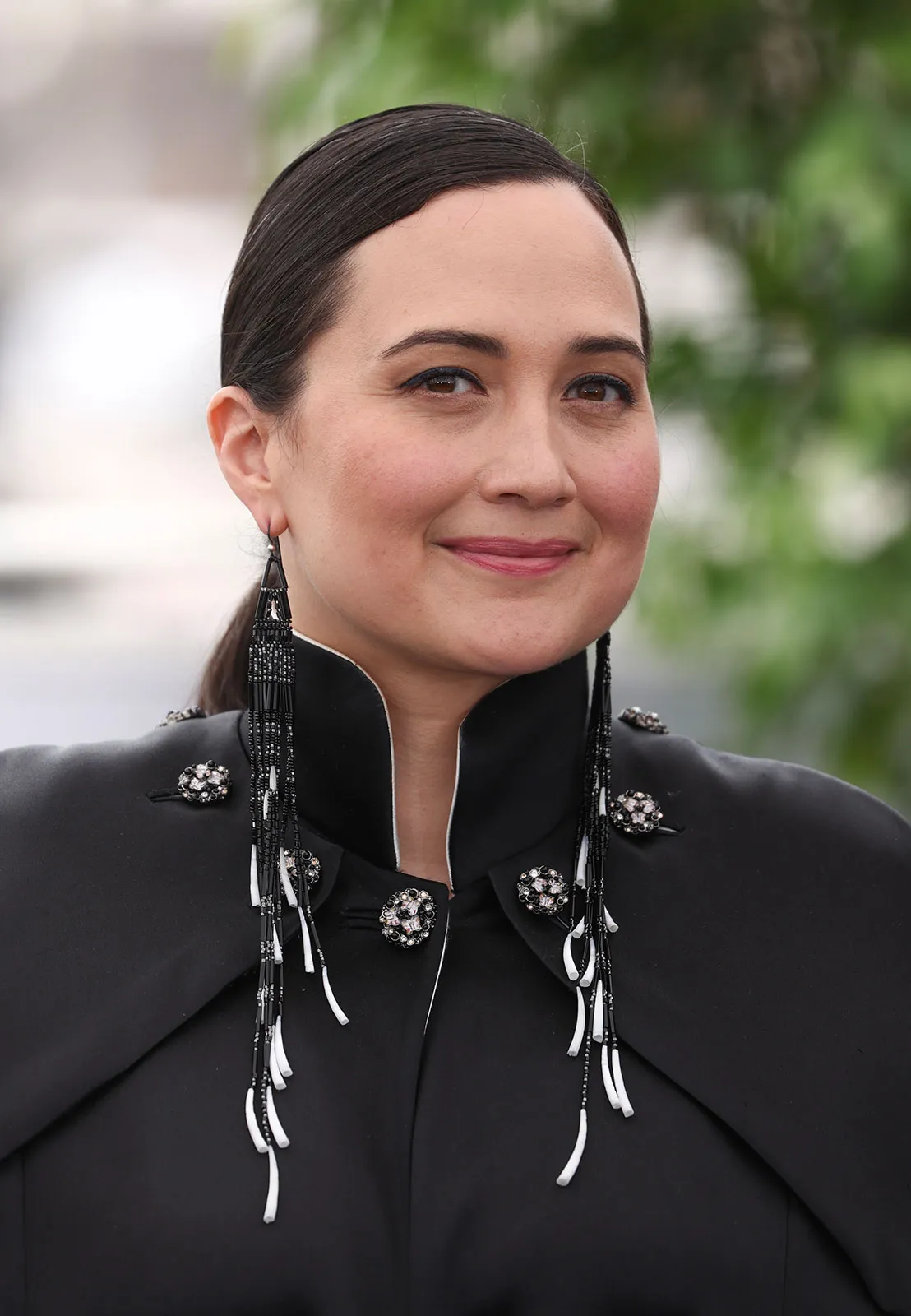
Lily Gladstone, Best Supporting Actress winner

- Best Film:
  - La La Land
- Best Director:
  - Damien Chazelle – La La Land
  - Runner-up: Kenneth Lonergan – Manchester by the Sea
- Best Actor:
  - Casey Affleck – Manchester by the Sea
  - Runner-up: Joel Edgerton – Loving
- Best Actress:
  - Isabelle Huppert – Elle and Things to Come
  - Runner-up: Natalie Portman – Jackie
- Best Supporting Actor:
  - Mahershala Ali – Moonlight
- Best Supporting Actress:
  - Lily Gladstone – Certain Women
- Best Screenplay:
  - Kenneth Lonergan – Manchester by the Sea
  - Runner-up: Jim Jarmusch – Paterson
- Best Original Score:
  - Mica Levi – Jackie
- Best Animated Film:
  - Tower
- Best Foreign Language Film:
  - The Handmaiden
  - Runner-up: Things to Come
- Best Documentary:
  - O.J.: Made in America
- Best Cinematography:
  - Chung Chung-hoon – The Handmaiden
  - Runner-up: James Laxton – Moonlight
- Best Editing:
  - Tom Cross – La La Land
- Best New Filmmaker:
  - Robert Eggers – The Witch
- Best Ensemble Cast:
  - Moonlight
  - Runner-up: Certain Women
