= Rabbit, Rabbit (TV series) =

Upcoming television series

- Genre: Crime drama
- Created by: Peter Craig
- Written by: Peter Craig
- Directed by: Philip Barantini
- Starring: Adam Driver; Regina Hall; Will Poulter; Odessa Young
- Country of origin: United States
- Original language: English

Production
- Executive producers: Philip Barantini; Adam Driver; Peter Craig; Bryan Unkeless; Samantha Beddoe
- Production companies: MRC; Night Owl; It's All Made Up Productions

Original release
- Network: Netflix

Rabbit, Rabbit is an upcoming Netflix crime drama television series, created and written by Peter Craig, starring Adam Driver and Regina Hall.

== Premise ==
A cornered escaped prisoner with hostages in Illinois has dialogue with a trained FBI Crisis Negotiator.

== Cast ==
=== Main ===
- Adam Driver as J-Will
- Regina Hall as Poppy
- Will Poulter
- Odessa Young

=== Recurring ===
- Clarence Maclin
- Alison Pill
- Brian d’Arcy James
- Spencer Reed Tomich
- Susannah Flood
- Ada Bland
- Alex Morf
- Annie Golden
- April Matthis
- Ashlyn Maddox
- C. J. Wilson
- Darion Basco
- Jason Schmidt
- Jeremy Gill
- Kai Drake
- Karoline
- Liz Caribel Sierra
- Mac Brandt
- Mike Houston
- Patch Darragh
- Reed Birney
- Sam Vartholomeos
- Samantha Jones
- Sara Gutierrez
- Thomas Francis Murphy

== Production ==
The series was ordered by Netflix in October 2025, with Peter Craig and Philip Barantini serving as writer and director of all episodes respectively. Adam Driver leads the cast and executive produces alongside Craig, Barantini, Bryan Unkeless and Samantha Beddoe.

Regina Hall, Will Poulter and Odessa Young joined the cast in January 2026. In February, Clarence Maclin was cast in a recurring role. In March, it was announced that Alison Pill, Brian d’Arcy James, Spencer Reed Tomich, Susannah Flood, Ada Bland, Alex Morf, Annie Golden, April Matthis, Ashlyn Maddox, C. J. Wilson, Darion Basco, Jason Schmidt, Jeremy Gill, Kai Drake, Karoline, Liz Caribel Sierra, Mac Brandt, Mike Houston, Patch Darragh, Reed Birney, Sam Vartholomeos, Samantha Jones, Sara Gutierrez and Thomas Francis Murphy had been cast in recurring roles.

In March 2026, filming of the series began in New Jersey.
