= Daniel J. Jones =

Lead investigator in CIA torture report

- Born: Pennsylvania, U.S.
- Education: Elizabethtown College (BA); Johns Hopkins University (MA); Harvard Kennedy School (MPP)
- Occupations: Former FBI and U.S. Senate investigator Research and investigative services
- Years active: 2007–present
- Known for: Senate Intelligence Committee report on CIA torture
- Notable work: Senate Report on CIA Torture

Daniel J. Jones is an American former United States Senate investigator who served as the senior staff lead on the United States Senate Select Committee on Intelligence investigation into the CIA's use of torture in the wake of the September 11 attacks. Jones is the founder and president of Advance Democracy, Inc. (ADI), a nonpartisan, non-profit organization that conducts public interest investigations around the world that promote "accountability, transparency, and good governance", according to its description. Jones is also the founder of The Penn Quarter Group, a research and investigative advisory headquartered in Washington, DC.

Jones previously worked as an investigator for the Senate and the Federal Bureau of Investigation (FBI). As a staff member of the U.S. Senate Select Committee on Intelligence, he led several prominent investigations, including the Senate Intelligence Committee's report on CIA torture, also known as the Torture Report.

Jones was a fellow at the Carr Center for Human Rights Policy at Harvard Kennedy School from 2017 to 2019.

== Early life and education ==
Jones is originally from Pennsylvania. He earned a bachelor of arts degree from Elizabethtown College in Elizabethtown, Pennsylvania, a master of arts in teaching from Johns Hopkins University in Baltimore, and a master of public policy from Harvard Kennedy School at Harvard University.

== Career ==
After college, he worked as a middle school teacher with Teach For America, an AmeriCorps national service program. Jones spent four years with the Federal Bureau of Investigation before joining the United States Senate Select Committee on Intelligence under the leadership of its then-chairman, Senator Jay Rockefeller. Jones subsequently worked for Senator Dianne Feinstein when she became chair of the same.

In 2000, he was named to People Magazine's 100 most eligible bachelors.

He is on the board of advocates for Human Rights First and currently leads his own research and investigative consultancy, the Penn Quarter Group, and a non-profit organization, Advance Democracy, Inc. He was a fellow at the Carr Center for Human Rights Policy from 2017 to 2019.

=== Torture report ===
Jones was the lead investigator and author of the Senate Select Committee on Intelligence Committee Report of the CIA's Detention and Interrogation Program, the largest investigation in U.S. Senate history. According to The Washington Post, Jones worked alongside Alissa Starzak, a former CIA lawyer, who then left the committee in 2011, on an initial investigation into the CIA's destruction of interrogation videotapes.

Based on more than 6.3 million pages of classified documents, the investigation was described by the Los Angeles Times as the "most extensive review of U.S. intelligence-gathering tactics in generations."

Jones departed the committee shortly after the completion of the report, and Senator Dianne Feinstein praised Jones for his "indefatigable work on the Intelligence Committee staff" upon his departure.

Jones' investigative work on the Senate Intelligence Committee was detailed in a three-part series in The Guardian in September 2016. In 2019, his work was the subject of a major motion picture, The Report, where he is portrayed by Oscar nominee Adam Driver.

In addition to the film, an audiobook of the executive summary of the Senate's Torture Report, read by the cast of the film, was released in 2019. A podcast featuring interviews with key individuals has also been published.

=== Democracy Integrity Project ===
In 2017, Jones founded the Democracy Integrity Project as a 501(c)(4) advocacy group serving as president and CEO. The group purports to investigate interference and disinformation operations in American and international elections by hostile foreign powers.

In 2018, the New Knowledge (later renamed Yonder) launched Disinfo2018, in collaboration with the Daniel J. Jones's Democracy Integrity Project. Democracy Integrity Project paid New Knowledge (listed under the registered corporate name Popily, Inc.) $230,000 according to the project's 2018 tax filings.

In 2021, Fox News reported on tax documents that revealed that the organization gave $521,000 to Christopher Steele and $405,000 to Fusion GPS, the researchers that created the controversial Steele Dossier in 2020.

According to statements given to the Daily Caller by Christopher Steel's attorney, Jones claimed The Democracy Integrity Project's work on the Steele Dossier with Fusion GPS was financed through grants made by George Soros and other silicon valley billionaires. Soro's representatives deny directly funding the work by Fusion GPS, but acknowledged grants were made directly to The Democracy Integrity Project.
