= Paterson (film) =

2016 drama film

- Theatrical release poster
- Directed by: Jim Jarmusch
- Written by: Jim Jarmusch
- Produced by: Joshua Astrachan; Carter Logan
- Starring: Adam Driver; Golshifteh Farahani; Barry Shabaka Henley; Cliff Smith; Chasten Harmon; William Jackson Harper; Masatoshi Nagase
- Cinematography: Frederick Elmes
- Edited by: Affonso Gonçalves
- Music by: Carter Logan
- Production companies: K5 International; Le Pacte; Animal Kingdom; Inkjet Productions
- Distributed by: Amazon Studios; Bleecker Street (United States); Le Pacte (France); K5 International (Germany)
- Release dates: May 16, 2016 (Cannes); November 17, 2016 (Germany); December 21, 2016 (France); December 28, 2016 (United States)
- Running time: 118 minutes
- Countries: United States; Germany; France
- Language: English
- Budget: $5 million
- Box office: $10.8 million

Paterson is a 2016 drama film written and directed by Jim Jarmusch. The film stars Adam Driver as a bus driver and poet named Paterson, and Golshifteh Farahani as his wife, who dreams of being a country music star and opening a cupcake business as the two live out their day to day life in Paterson, New Jersey.

Paterson was selected to compete for the Palme d'Or at the 2016 Cannes Film Festival, where it won the Palm Dog Award. It was released in Germany on November 17, 2016, by K5 International; in France on December 21, 2016, by Le Pacte; and in the United States on December 28, 2016, by Amazon Studios and Bleecker Street.

== Plot ==
In Paterson, New Jersey, a man named Paterson works as a busser for NJ Transit. Paterson gets up early and goes to work, where he listens to passengers talking and, during breaks at work, writes poetry in a notebook he carries with him. After work, he walks Marvin, the family dog, and stops for a beer at Shades Bar, where he interacts with the other patrons and the owner, Doc.

Paterson's wife, Laura, loves his poems and is apparently their only audience. She has long urged him to publish them or at least make copies. He finally promises to go to the copy shop on the weekend. But when Paterson and Laura come home from a movie on Saturday night, they find that Marvin has shredded his notebook, destroying his poems.

The next day, a distraught Paterson goes for a walk and sits down at his favorite site, the Great Falls of the Passaic River. There, a Japanese man takes a seat beside him and begins a conversation about poetry after Paterson notices that the man is reading the book-length poem Paterson by William Carlos Williams. The man seems to know that Paterson himself is a poet even though he denies it and hands him a gift, an empty notebook. The film ends with Paterson writing a poem in his new notebook.

== Cast ==
- Adam Driver as Paterson
- Golshifteh Farahani as Laura
- William Jackson Harper as Everett
- Chasten Harmon as Marie
- Barry Shabaka Henley as Doc
- Rizwan Manji as Donny
- Masatoshi Nagase as Japanese Poet
- Kara Hayward as Female Student
- Jared Gilman as Male Student
- Method Man as Method Man
- Sterling Jerins as Young Poet

== Production ==
In April 2014, it was announced that Jim Jarmusch would write and direct a film about a poet living in Paterson, New Jersey. In January 2016, it was revealed that Adam Driver and Golshifteh Farahani had been cast in the film, with Oliver Simon and Daniel Baur serving as executive producers under their K5 Film banner, while Joshua Astrachan and Carter Logan would produce under their Animal Kingdom and Inkjet banners respectively.

The film was shot over 30 days in fall 2015, in Paterson, New Jersey, and various locations in New York. Adam Driver obtained his commercial bus driver's license for the film.

The poet Ron Padgett provided the poems attributed to the character Paterson, while Jarmusch wrote the poem "Water Falls" attributed to a young girl in the film. The film features four of Padgett's existing poems and three new poems written for the film.

== Release ==
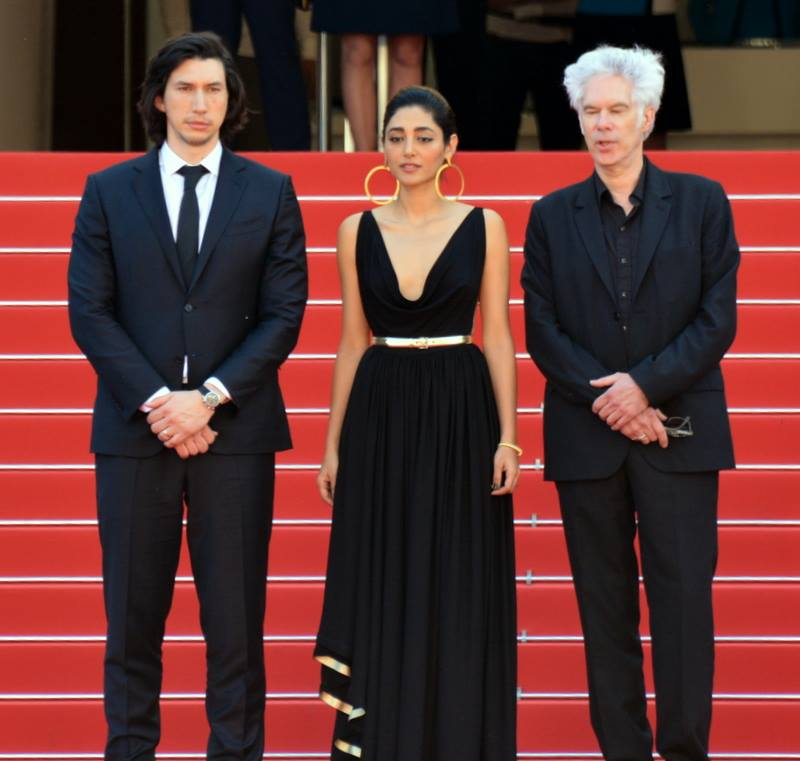
Adam Driver, Golshifteh Farahani and Jim Jarmusch at the 2016 Cannes Film Festival

The film had its world premiere on May 16, 2016, at the 2016 Cannes Film Festival, where it competed for the Palme d'Or. Amazon Studios distributed the film in the United States. It was later announced that Bleecker Street was partnering with Amazon on releasing the film, on December 28, 2016. It was released in Germany on November 17, 2016 and in France on December 21, 2016. It opened for a limited run in the eponymous city on January 27, 2017.

=== Critical reception ===
On the review aggregator website Rotten Tomatoes, the film has an approval rating of 96%, based on 256 reviews, with an average rating of 8.49/10. The site's critical consensus reads, "Paterson adds another refreshingly unvarnished entry to Jim Jarmusch's filmography—and another outstanding performance to Adam Driver's career credits." On Metacritic, the film has a score of 90 out of 100, based on 41 critics. The film has a user rating of 3.9/5 on Letterboxd.

Todd McCarthy of The Hollywood Reporter gave a positive review, writing of Jarmusch: "A mild-mannered, almost startlingly undramatic work that offers discreet pleasures to longtime fans of the New York indie-scene veteran, who can always be counted on to go his own way." Eric Kohn of Indiewire also gave a positive review, writing: "But Paterson has too much clarity of mind to fall into a similar category. The story builds to an accidental circumstance that, on the surface, might not seem like a big deal—but in the context of Paterson’s tiny universe, resonates with tragic connotations. The brilliantly cryptic finale explores what it means to work back from personal setbacks to find a new source of inspiration. It’s an apt statement from Jarmusch, a filmmaker who continues to surprise and innovate while remaining true to his singular voice, and who here seems to have delivered its purest manifestation." David Edelstein noted the film's unreality, writing: "What Jarmusch hasn't attempted in his Paterson is to explore the part of the city that was called, when Williams wrote about it, 'the slums.' Perhaps he felt that abject poverty wouldn't suit his slightly ironic distance, that it would rip the film's fragile fabric. It might have, but without that edge this Paterson comes close to seeming twee, like one of Wes Anderson's dollhouse communities. The poems make all the difference, transforming the most amorphous yearnings into something hard and beautiful and real."

=== Accolades ===
List of awards and nominations
Award	Date of ceremony	Category	Recipient(s)	Result	Ref.
Belgian Film Critics Association	January 7, 2017	Grand Prix	Paterson	Nominated	
Boston Society of Film Critics Awards	December 11, 2016	Best Screenplay	Jim Jarmusch	Runner-up	
Cannes Film Festival	May 22, 2016	Palm Dog Award	Nellie (posthumous award)	Won	
Cannes Film Festival	May 22, 2016	Palme d'Or	Jim Jarmusch	Nominated	
Chicago Film Critics Association	December 15, 2016	Best Actor	Adam Driver	Nominated	
Gotham Awards	November 28, 2016	Best Feature	Paterson	Nominated	
Gotham Awards	November 28, 2016	Best Actor	Adam Driver	Nominated	
Gotham Awards	November 28, 2016	Best Screenplay	Jim Jarmusch	Nominated	
Gotham Awards	November 28, 2016	Audience Award	Paterson	Nominated	
IndieWire Critics Poll	December 19, 2016	Best Film	Paterson	6th Place	
IndieWire Critics Poll	December 19, 2016	Best Actor	Adam Driver	Runner-up	
IndieWire Critics Poll	December 19, 2016	Best Screenplay	Paterson	9th Place	
London Film Critics' Circle	January 22, 2017	Actor of the Year	Adam Driver	Nominated	
Los Angeles Film Critics Association	December 4, 2016	Best Actor	Adam Driver	Won	
National Society of Film Critics	January 7, 2017	Best Actor	Adam Driver	3rd Place	
Online Film Critics Society	January 3, 2017	Best Picture	Paterson	Nominated	
Online Film Critics Society	January 3, 2017	Best Actor	Adam Driver	Nominated	
San Diego Film Critics Society	December 12, 2016	Best Actor	Adam Driver	Nominated	
Toronto Film Critics Association	December 11, 2016	Best Actor	Adam Driver	Won	
Women Film Critics Circle	December 19, 2016	Best Male Image in a Movie	Paterson	Nominated	
Women Film Critics Circle	December 19, 2016	Best Screen Couple	Paterson	Nominated	
Women Film Critics Circle	December 19, 2016	Best Equality of the Sexes	Paterson	Nominated	
