= The Report (2019 film) =

2019 film by Scott Z. Burns

- Theatrical release poster
- Directed by: Scott Z. Burns
- Written by: Scott Z. Burns
- Based on: (in part) the article "Rorschach and Awe" by Katherine Eban
- Produced by: Steven Soderbergh; Jennifer Fox; Scott Z. Burns; Kerry Orent; Michael Sugar; Eddy Moretti; Danny Gabai
- Starring: Adam Driver; Annette Bening; Jon Hamm; Ted Levine; Michael C. Hall; Tim Blake Nelson; Corey Stoll; Maura Tierney
- Cinematography: Eigil Bryld
- Edited by: Greg O'Bryant
- Music by: David Wingo
- Production companies: VICE Studios; Unbranded Pictures; Margin of Error; Topic Studios
- Distributed by: Amazon Studios
- Release dates: January 26, 2019 (Sundance); November 15, 2019 (United States)
- Running time: 119 minutes
- Country: United States
- Language: English
- Budget: $8 million
- Box office: $275,000

The Report (styled as The ~~Torture~~ Report) is a 2019 American historical political drama film written and directed by Scott Z. Burns that stars Adam Driver, Annette Bening, Jon Hamm, Ted Levine, Michael C. Hall, Tim Blake Nelson, Corey Stoll, and Maura Tierney.

It depicts the efforts of staffer Daniel Jones as he led the Senate Intelligence Committee's investigation of the Central Intelligence Agency's use of torture following the September 11th attacks, covering more than a decade's worth of real-life political intrigue related to the contents, creation, and release of the 6,700-pages of the U.S. Senate report on CIA torture.

The film had its world premiere at the 2019 Sundance Film Festival on January 26, 2019. It was released in theaters in the United States by Amazon Studios on November 15, 2019, two weeks before it began streaming on Amazon Prime on November 29. Critical reviews of the film were generally positive.

== Plot ==
In early 2009, Senator Dianne Feinstein selects Senate staffer Daniel J. Jones, who has just spent two years investigating the 2005 destruction of CIA interrogation videotapes, to lead a review of six million pages of CIA materials related to the agency's use of enhanced interrogation techniques (EITs). Jones and his team of six get to work in a sensitive compartmented information facility at a covert CIA site in Virginia.

Intelligence psychologists Bruce Jessen and James Elmer Mitchell were contracted in 2002 to instruct the CIA in EITs. They started their work on Abu Zubaydah, for whom the FBI initially used the CIA rapport-building, where they started using EITs.

Jones learned from an FBI agent that he gathered crucial intelligence from Zubaydah before the CIA took over the interrogations, though the agency claims that most valuable intel came from EITs. He shows evidence from the CIA's own records that prove that the agency falsely claimed that Zubaydah was a high-ranking member of Al-Qaeda to received authorization to start using EITs on him.

A physician assistant with the Office of Medical Services who works at a CIA black site secretly reveals to Jones that he and other medical professionals had complained that the EITs were torture. However, they only got told to stop putting their objections in writing by the Director.

Among files provided by the CIA, Jones finds the Panetta Review, a critical internal CIA review of the EIT program that was prepared in 2009 but never shared. (Note: The Panetta Review was a secret review of the use of torture by the CIA under the administration of George W. Bush, which was conducted by then CIA director Leon Panetta, who served under President Obama as CIA director from February 19, 2009, until June 30, 2011. According to a March 7, 2014, New York Times article, the review yielded a series of memoranda that "cast a particularly harsh light" on the Bush-era interrogation program.") A pundit on the news later claims that EITs had yielded good intelligence and prevented terrorist attacks.

Jones stays up all night to disprove the claims, and the CIA's own records show that crucial information it is claiming to have obtained by subjecting a terrorist (Note: Khalid Sheikh Mohammad.) to torture was obtained by other means.

Jones finishes the 6,200-page report, and it is approved by the Senate Intelligence Committee, chaired by Feinstein, on December 13, 2012, and sent to the CIA for final comments. Two months later, John Brennan is sworn in as the new director of the CIA. Brennan sets up meetings with CIA personnel and Jones to try to get the committee to change elements of the report.

However, Jones repeatedly provides evidence to back up everything they want to change. Feinstein decides to stop this discussion with the CIA and keep the report as it is. Frustrated, Jones reveals the Panetta Review to Senator Mark Udall of the Intelligence Committee. During a Senate Intelligence Committee hearing on the nomination of the CIA general counsel, Udall asks why both the committee's reports and the Panetta Review conflict with the CIA's official position.

The CIA, humiliated by Udall's revelation, conducts an illegal search and threaten to prosecute Jones for "stealing" the Panetta Review from the CIA's computers. Jones hints the search to the New York Times national security reporter, which ultimately leads Feinstein to formally accuse the CIA of unlawfully searching the Senate's computers in violation of the separation of powers. Brennan and the CIA are forced to back down, and the charges against Jones are dropped.

Feinstein tells Jones that she is prepared to release a shorter summary of the report, but President Barack Obama grants the CIA broad authority to redact it first. When it becomes uncertain if the released document will have any useful information after redaction, Jones again meets with the Times reporter, but ultimately decides not to leak the report to the media.

The Republican Party wins control of the Senate in the November 2014 midterm elections, meaning that the report will likely be buried forever when the new Congress is sworn in January 2015. Faced with this deadline, the Senate agrees to release the summary of the report. Feinstein gives a speech summarizing the report and its implications, and then Senator John McCain, who was tortured as a prisoner of war during the Vietnam War, gives an impassioned speech supporting the report.

Jones leaves his job as a Senate staffer after the report summary released. No CIA officers are criminally charged in connection with the actions outlined in the report, with many promoted, and one (Note: This is an allusion to Gina Haspel.) later becomes the agency director.

== Cast ==
- Adam Driver as Daniel Jones
- Corey Stoll as Cyrus Clifford
- Evander Duck, Jr. as off-site security guard
- Jon Hamm as Denis McDonough
- Linda Powell as Marcy Morris
- Annette Bening as Senator Dianne Feinstein
- John Rothman as Senator Sheldon Whitehouse
- Victor Slezak as Senator Jay Rockefeller
- Guy Boyd as Senator Saxby Chambliss
- Alexander Chaplin as Sean Murphy
- Joanne Tucker as Gretchen
- Maura Tierney as Bernadette
- Michael C. Hall as Thomas Eastman
- Ian Blackman as Cofer Black
- Dominic Fumusa as George Tenet
- Joseph Siravo as John Rizzo
- Sarah Goldberg as April
- Lucas Dixon as Julian
- Fajer Kaisi as Ali Soufan
- Zuhdi Boueri as Abu Zubaydah
- Douglas Hodge as James Mitchell
- T. Ryder Smith as Bruce Jessen
- Carlos Gomez as Jose Rodriguez
- Tim Blake Nelson as Raymond Nathan
- Pun Bandhu as John Yoo
- Ben McKenzie as Scrubbed CIA Officer
- Jake Silbermann as Yoked Up CIA Officer
- Ratnesh Dubey as Khalid Sheikh Mohammed
- Ted Levine as John Brennan
- Scott Shepherd as Senator Mark Udall
- Daniel London as CIA Officer Fox
- Jennifer Morrison as Caroline Krass
- Matthew Rhys as New York Times Reporter
- Kate Beahan as Candace Ames
- James Hindman as Inspector General Buckley
- Noah Bean as Senator Martin Heinrich

== Production ==
The film was announced in April 2018, with Scott Z. Burns directing and writing, and Adam Driver, Annette Bening, Jon Hamm, and Jennifer Morrison signed on to star.

When asked by PBS NewsHour's Jeffrey Brown about his motivation for making a film inspired by the controversial 2014 Senate Intelligence Committee report on CIA torture, Burns replied that both of his parents are psychologists, and he found it "appalling" to learn from the report that "people had figured out a way to weaponize psychology," a profession that "exists to help people." Burns further said that he and producer Steven Soderbergh felt it reflected well on the United States that the government allowed the summary of the report to be published. In the same interview, Soderbergh said he did not know "that there's another country, other than maybe Canada or the UK," that "would have even allowed this kind of investigation."

Some of the characters that appear in the film are composite characters, such as Bernadette, who bears some resemblance to Gina Haspel. Haspel oversaw the CIA black site in Thailand where Abu Zubaydah was tortured, and later managed to push her bosses to destroy the tapes of the torture. According to the CIA, Haspel was not, however, in charge of the site during Zubaydah's interrogation.

Production began on April 16, 2018, in New York. Tim Blake Nelson, Ben McKenzie, Matthew Rhys, Ted Levine, and Michael C. Hall were added to the cast the following month, and Maura Tierney joined the cast in June. The film's fifty-day shooting schedule and $18 million budget were cut to twenty-six days and $8 million.

== Release ==
The Report had its world premiere at the Sundance Film Festival on January 26, 2019, and Amazon Studios acquired its distribution rights shortly thereafter for $14 million. In October, it appeared as a spotlight film at the Hamptons International Film Festival. In the United States, the film was scheduled for a theatrical release on September 27, 2019, two weeks before its streaming release on Amazon Prime Video on October 11, but those dates were changed to November 15 and November 29, respectively.

== Reception ==
=== Box office ===
Unlike with its previous titles, Amazon did not publicly disclose The Report's theatrical grosses, but IndieWire estimated that it grossed around $150,000 from 84 theaters over its opening weekend. The site wrote that "the response, so far as we can determine, are [sic] under the usual Amazon performance." Playing in just 60 theaters the following weekend, the film made an estimated $75,000.

=== Critical response ===
On the review aggregator website Rotten Tomatoes, 82% of 245 critics' reviews of the film are positive, with an average rating of 7.2/10; the site's "critics consensus" reads: "The Report draws on a dark chapter in American history to offer a sober, gripping account of one public servant's crusade for accountability." On Metacritic, the film has a weighted average score of 66 out of 100 based on reviews by 33 critics, indicating "generally favorable" reviews. Certain critics compared the film to political thrillers from the 1970s, in contrast to more recent works. For instance, Owen Gleiberman of Variety said he found The Report "at once gripping and eye-opening" in a way that made him think of All the President's Men (1976).

Human Rights First awarded the 2019 Sidney Lumet Award for Integrity in Entertainment to The Report. In 2020, the film won the Cinema for Peace Award for Political Film of the Year.

== Accolades ==
Year	Award	Category	Recipient	Result	Ref.
2019	São Paulo International Film Festival	Best First Feature	Scott Z. Burns	Nominated	
2019	Philadelphia Film Festival	Best First Feature	Scott Z. Burns	Nominated	
2019	Political Film Society	Democracy	The Report	Nominated	
2019	Washington DC Area Film Critics Association Awards	Best Portrayal of Washington, DC	The Report	Won	
2020	77th Golden Globe Awards	Best Supporting Actress	Annette Bening	Nominated	
2020	Alliance of Women Film Journalists	Best Supporting Actress	Annette Bening	Nominated	
2020	Florida Film Critics Circle Awards	Best Supporting Actress	Annette Bening	Nominated	
2020	Dallas-Fort Worth Film Critics Association Awards	Best Supporting Actress	Annette Bening	Nominated	
2020	Phoenix Critics Circle	Best Supporting Actress	Annette Bening	Nominated	
2020	St. Louis Film Critics Association	Best Supporting Actress	Annette Bening	Nominated	
2020	North Texas Film Critics Association	Best Supporting Actress	Annette Bening	Nominated	
2020	Central Ohio Film Critics Association	Actor of the Year	Adam Driver	Won	
2020	Cinema for Peace Awards	Political Film of the Year	The Report	Won	

== See also ==
- Criticism of the war on terror
- List of historical drama films set in the information age
- List of Amazon Studios films
- Steven Soderbergh filmography
- Jon Hamm filmography
- 2019 in film
