= List of awards and nominations received by Kenneth Lonergan =

Kenneth Lonergan awards and nominations
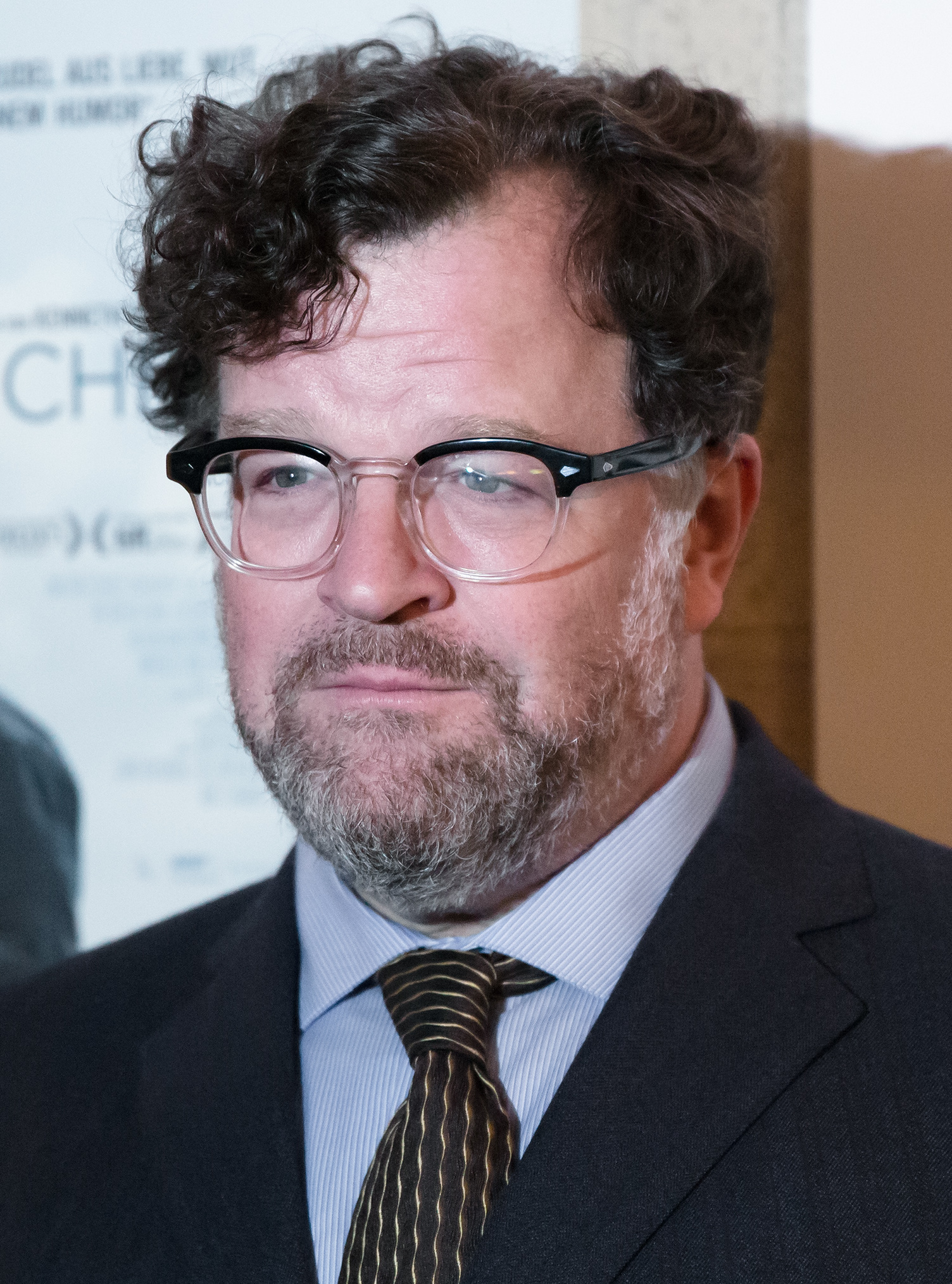
Awards and nominations
Award	Wins	Nominations
Academy Awards	1	4
BAFTA Awards	1	3
Golden Globe Awards	0	3
Olivier Awards	0	1
Tony Awards	0	1

Totals (Note: Certain award groups do not simply award one winner. They acknowledge several different recipients, have runners-up, and have third place. Since this is a specific recognition and is different from losing an award, runner-up mentions are considered wins in this award tally. For simplification and to avoid errors, each award in this list has been presumed to have had a prior nomination.)
- Wins: 6
- Nominations: 18

Kenneth Lonergan is an American playwright, director, and screenwriter. Over his career he has received several awards including an Academy Award and BAFTA Award as well as nominations for three Golden Globe Awards, a Laurence Olivier Award and a Tony Award.

He has received four Academy Award nominations three for Best Original Screenplay for You Can Count on Me (2000), Gangs of New York (2002), and Manchester by the Sea (2016) winning for the later. He has also received nomination for Tony Award for Best Revival of a Play for The Waverly Gallery in 2019.

== Major associations ==
=== Academy Awards ===
Year	Category	Nominated work	Result	Ref.
2000	Best Original Screenplay	You Can Count on Me	Nominated	
2002	Best Original Screenplay	Gangs of New York	Nominated	
2016	Best Original Screenplay	Manchester by the Sea	Won	
2016	Best Director	Manchester by the Sea	Nominated	

Directed Academy Award performances
Under Lonergan's direction, these actors have received Academy Award nominations (and one win) for their performances in their respective roles.

Year	Performer	Film	Result
Academy Award for Best Actor
2016	Casey Affleck	Manchester by the Sea	Won
Academy Award for Best Actress
2000	Laura Linney	You Can Count on Me	Nominated
Academy Award for Best Supporting Actor
2016	Lucas Hedges	Manchester by the Sea	Nominated
Academy Award for Best Supporting Actress
2016	Michelle Williams	Manchester by the Sea	Nominated

=== BAFTA Awards ===
Year	Category	Nominated work	Result	Ref.
British Academy Film Awards
2002	Best Original Screenplay	Gangs of New York	Nominated	
2016	Best Original Screenplay	Manchester by the Sea	Won	
2016	Best Direction	Manchester by the Sea	Nominated	

=== Golden Globe Awards ===
Year	Category	Nominated work	Result	Ref.
2000	Best Screenplay	You Can Count on Me	Nominated	
2016	Best Screenplay	Manchester by the Sea	Nominated	
2016	Best Director	Manchester by the Sea	Nominated	

=== Tony Awards ===
Year	Category	Nominated work	Result	Ref.
2019	Best Revival of a Play	The Waverly Gallery	Nominated	

== Theatre awards ==
=== Drama Desk Awards ===
Year	Category	Nominated work	Result	Ref.
1996	Best Play	This Is Our Youth	Nominated	
2001	Best Play	Lobby Hero	Nominated	

=== Pulitzer Prize ===
Year	Category	Nominated work	Result	Ref.
2000	Pulitzer Prize for Drama	The Waverly Gallery	Nominated	

=== Laurence Olivier Awards ===
Year	Category	Nominated work	Result	Ref.
2001	Best Play	Lobby Hero	Nominated	

=== Outer Critics Circle Awards ===
Year	Category	Nominated work	Result	Ref.
2001	Outstanding New Off-Broadway Play	Lobby Hero	Nominated	
2001	John Gassner Award	Lobby Hero	Nominated	
2016	Outstanding New Off-Broadway Play	Hold On to Me Darling	Nominated	
2018	Outstanding Revival of a Play	Lobby Hero	Nominated	

== Industry awards ==
=== Directors Guild Awards ===
Year	Category	Nominated work	Result	Ref.
2016	Outstanding Directing - Feature Film	Manchester by the Sea	Nominated	

=== Writers Guild Awards ===
Year	Category	Nominated work	Result	Ref.
2000	Best Original Screenplay	You Can Count on Me	Won	
2002	Best Original Screenplay	Gangs of New York	Nominated	
2016	Best Original Screenplay	Manchester by the Sea	Nominated	

== Miscellaneous awards ==
Year	Award	Category	Film	Result
2000	Independent Spirit Award	Best First Feature	You Can Count on Me	Won
2000	Independent Spirit Award	Best Screenplay	You Can Count on Me	Won
2000	Sundance Film Festival	Grand Jury Prize for Drama	You Can Count on Me	Won
2000	Sundance Film Festival	Waldo Salt Screenwriting Award	You Can Count on Me	Won
2000	Toronto Film Critics Association	Best Screenplay	You Can Count on Me	Won
2000	AFI Award	Best New Writer	You Can Count on Me	Won
2000	National Board of Review	Special Achievement Award	You Can Count on Me	Won
2000	National Society of Film Critics Award	Best Screenplay	You Can Count on Me	Won
2000	New York Film Critics Circle Award	Best Screenplay	You Can Count on Me	Won
2000	Los Angeles Film Critics Association	Best Screenplay	You Can Count on Me	Won
2000	Boston Society of Film Critics Award	Best New Filmmaker	You Can Count on Me	Won
2000	Chicago Film Critics Association Award	Best Screenplay	You Can Count on Me	Nominated
2000	Dallas–Fort Worth Film Critics Association	Russell Smith Award	You Can Count on Me	Won
2000	Satellite Award	Best Screenplay	You Can Count on Me	Won
2011	Boston Society of Film Critics Award	Best Screenplay	Margaret	Nominated
2011	London Film Critics' Circle Award	Screenwriter of the Year	Margaret	Nominated
2016	Independent Spirit Award	Best Screenplay	Manchester by the Sea	Nominated
2016	Gotham Award	Best Screenplay	Manchester by the Sea	Nominated
2016	National Board of Review	Best Original Screenplay	Manchester by the Sea	Won
2016	New York Film Critics Circle Award	Best Screenplay	Manchester by the Sea	Won
2016	Los Angeles Film Critics Association	Best Screenplay	Manchester by the Sea	Nominated
2016	Satellite Award	Best Director	Manchester by the Sea	Won
2016	Satellite Award	Best Original Screenplay	Manchester by the Sea	Nominated
2016	Washington D.C. Film Critics Association	Best Director	Manchester by the Sea	Nominated
2016	Washington D.C. Film Critics Association	Best Original Screenplay	Manchester by the Sea	Nominated
