= Lobby Hero =

Play written by Kenneth Lonergan

- Written by: Kenneth Lonergan
- Characters: Jeff; William; Dawn; Bill
- Original language: English
- Genre: Drama
- Setting: lobby of a middle-income high-rise apartment building in Manhattan, and the street outside

Premiere
- Date premiered: March 13, 2001
- Place premiered: Playwrights Horizons, New York City

Lobby Hero is a play by Kenneth Lonergan. It premiered off-Broadway in 2001.

== Production history ==
Lobby Hero premiered off-Broadway at Playwrights Horizons, on March 13, 2001, and closed on April 15, 2001, reopening at the John Houseman Theatre on May 8, 2001, and closing on September 2, 2001. The cast featured Glenn Fitzgerald as Jeff, Heather Burns as Dawn, Tate Donovan as Bill, and Dion Graham as William. It was directed by Mark Brokaw.

The UK première was staged at the Donmar Warehouse. It began previews on April 4, opened on April 10 and closed on May 4, 2002. The cast included David Tennant (Jeff), Charlotte Randle (Dawn), Dominic Rowan (Bill), and Gary McDonald (William), and was again directed by Mark Brokaw. This production transferred to the New Ambassadors Theatre on June 26 (opening July 1), and ran until August 10, 2002.

A revival opened on Broadway on March 26, 2018, at the Helen Hayes Theatre; it starred Michael Cera (Jeff), Bel Powley (Dawn), Chris Evans (Bill), and Brian Tyree Henry (William). The production, directed by Trip Cullman, ran until May 13, 2018.

The English Theatre of Hamburg (Germany) premiered its production of Kenneth Lonergan’s ‘Lobby Hero’ in February 2024 with the following cast: Ned Rudkins Stow (Jeff), Peter Dewhurst (Bill), Chloe Ballantine (Dawn) and Daniel Gregory (William).

== Synopsis ==
The show follows a security guard in his late 20s, his strict supervisor, and an overbearing cop and his rookie female partner. The show is set in a foyer of a middle-income Manhattan apartment building in the middle of the night.

== Character summaries ==
- Jeff – 27-year-old security guard, unsuccessful with women
- Dawn – a police officer in her 20s
- Bill – Dawn's senior partner, who shows a romantic interest in her
- William – Jeff's boss

== Reviews ==
Toby Young said in a review in The Spectator, "Lobby Hero is a fantastic play but I'd be hard pushed to say why. You can tell it's good because, within about five minutes, any sense you have of being a member of the audience, sitting down and watching a group of actors perform on stage, has vanished.... In what amounts to an out-of-body experience, you're totally absorbed in what's going on...Lonergan is particularly good, both here and in This Is Our Youth, at showing how good intentions can be undermined by unconscious desires. Few of his characters are capable of resisting their own malignant impulses."

In her review of the 2018 revival, Marilyn Stasio wrote: "Set in the lobby of a generic Manhattan apartment building, the play looks both kindly and critically upon the kind of characters Lonergan loves to write: working-class stiffs, generally decent people who are unexpectedly challenged by issues of ethics....Helmer Trip Cullman does his best work with small, tight ensembles like this one, so there’s no slack in the emotional tension and no escape from the sticky web that even nice people get tangled up in when they tell lies – especially the lies they tell themselves."

== Awards and nominations ==
=== 2018 Broadway revival ===
Year	Award	Category	Nominee	Result	Ref.
2018	Tony Awards	Best Revival of a Play	Lobby Hero	Nominated	
2018	Tony Awards	Best Performance by a Featured Actor in a Play	Michael Cera	Nominated	
2018	Tony Awards	Best Performance by a Featured Actor in a Play	Brian Tyree Henry	Nominated	
2018	Drama League Awards	Outstanding Revival of a Broadway or Off-Broadway Play	Lobby Hero	Nominated	
2018	Drama League Awards	Distinguished Performance Award	Chris Evans	Nominated	
2018	Drama League Awards	Distinguished Performance Award	Brian Tyree Henry	Nominated	
2018	Drama Desk Awards	Outstanding Featured Actor in a Play	Brian Tyree Henry	Nominated	
2018	Outer Critics Circle Awards	Outstanding Revival of a Play (Broadway or Off-Broadway)	Lobby Hero	Nominated	
2018	Broadway.com Audience Awards	Favorite Featured Actor in a Play	Chris Evans	Won	
