= Burt (film) =

2025 American film

- Official poster
- Directed by: Joe Burke
- Written by: Joe Burke; Oliver Cooper
- Produced by: Joe Burke; Oliver Cooper
- Starring: Oliver Cooper; Burt Berger; Steven Levy; Catlin Adams
- Cinematography: Daniel Kenji Levin
- Edited by: Joe Burke
- Music by: Tim Rutili
- Production companies: The Juice is Loose; Floating Rock Pictures
- Distributed by: Filmhub
- Release dates: March 16, 2025 (CFF); June 16, 2026
- Running time: 77 minutes
- Country: United States
- Language: English
- Budget: $7,000

Burt is a 2025 American comedy-drama film directed by Joe Burke and starring Oliver Cooper, Burt Berger, Steven Levy, and Catlin Adams. Produced by Burke and Cooper and executive produced by David Gordon Green, Berger portrays a fictionalized version of himself, a 69-year-old musician with Parkinson's disease who finds out he has a son named Sammy (Cooper). The film is shot in black-and-white.

Burt premiered at the Cinequest Film Festival on March 16, 2025.

== Premise ==
Burt, a 69-year-old street musician living with Parkinson's disease, meets Sammy, a wayward young man from New York who shows up claiming to be his son. Having always dreamed of being a father, Burt embraces Sammy and invites him to stay for the weekend at his home, where he lives with his grumpy landlord, Steve.

== Cast ==
- Oliver Cooper as Sammy
- Burt Berger as Burt
- Steven Levy as Steve
- Catlin Adams as Sylvia
- Brenda Vaccaro as Patty Green
- Olivia Luccardi as Heide
- John Karna as Punk's Friend
- Louis Lombardi as Patty's Husband

== Production ==
Burke and Cooper grew up together in Sylvania, Ohio. Burt is their second collaboration on a feature film, following Four Dogs (2013).

Burke based the film on the real-life experiences of musician Burt Berger, who stars as a fictionalized version of himself. Berger has Parkinson's disease. Speaking to Metro Silicon Valley, Burke stated, "The movie is a love letter to him, his wonderful music, and to my own dad, who is also living with Parkinson’s." The film is shot in black-and-white, and filming was completed in seven days. The film's production budget was $7,000.

== Release ==
Burt premiered at the Cinequest Film Festival on March 16, 2025. The film screened at the Phoenix Film Festival from April 4–6, 2025, and at the Florida Film Festival on April 12 and 18.

In April 2026, Filmhub acquired the distribution rights to Burt, planning to release it digitally on June 23, 2026.

== Reception ==
Brian Tallerico of RogerEbert.com gave the film a highly positive review, calling the film a "delicate, clever character study," and praising Burke's direction.

=== Accolades ===
Year	Award	Category	Nominated work	Result	Ref.
2025	Cinequest Film Festival	Best Comedy Feature	Burt	Won	
2025	Phoenix Film Festival	Best Picture	Burt	Won	
2025	Phoenix Film Festival	Best Ensemble	Burt	Won	
