= Stealing Pulp Fiction =

2024 American film

- Official release poster
- Directed by: Danny Turkiewicz
- Written by: Danny Turkiewicz
- Based on: Stealing Pulp Fiction by Danny Turkiewicz
- Produced by: Danny Turkiewicz; Becca Standt; Joshua Zakaria; Ben Shields Catlin; Jordan Willcox; Slava Shut; Ian Novotny; Chris Barry
- Starring: Jon Rudnitsky; Cazzie David; Karan Soni; Taylor Hill; Oliver Cooper; Jason Alexander
- Cinematography: Joshua Allen
- Edited by: Ross Kolton; Natalie Toppino
- Music by: Adam Brock; Johnny Nicholl; Brandon Rosiar
- Production companies: Pillisdorf Pictures Production; Zakaria Entertainment; Story in the Sky
- Distributed by: Giant Pictures
- Release dates: October 19, 2024 (NBFF); June 27, 2025 (United States)
- Running time: 78 minutes
- Country: United States
- Language: English

Stealing Pulp Fiction is a 2024 American comedy heist film written, produced, and directed by Danny Turkiewicz, in his directorial debut. Based on Turkiewicz's short film of the same name, the film stars Jon Rudnitsky, Cazzie David, Karan Soni, Taylor Hill, Oliver Cooper, and Jason Alexander. It premiered at the Newport Beach Film Festival on October 19, 2024, and was released on video on demand and in selected theaters on June 27, 2025.

== Plot ==
Jonathan and Steve, fans of Quentin Tarantino, learn that a screening of Pulp Fiction at Tarantino's theater will use his personal 35 mm print and decide to steal it. They recruit their friend Elizabeth and their therapist, Dr. Mendelbaum, who discovers their plan while they are practicing the heist at the karate dojo where he has relocated his office. The group succeeds in stealing the film but are pursued by Tarantino and later divide the reels among themselves. Elizabeth burns her share as she had threatened to do, while Mendelbaum disappears with his portion. Jonathan decides to return the remaining reels to Tarantino, but after finally meeting Rachel, Mendelbaum's patient with whom he is infatuated, he abandons the plan and leaves the stolen reels behind.

== Cast ==
- Jon Rudnitsky as Jonathan
- Karan Soni as Steve
- Cazzie David as Elizabeth
- Taylor Hill as Rachel
- Oliver Cooper as Dusty
- Jason Alexander as Dr. Mendelbaum

== Production ==
In March 2023, Jon Rudnitsky, Karan Soni, Cazzie David, Taylor Hill, Oliver Cooper, and Jason Alexander were cast in the film, with Danny Turkiewicz set to write and direct.

== Release ==
The film premiered at the Newport Beach Film Festival on October 19, 2024. It screened at Fantasporto and the Glasgow Film Festival in 2025.

Giant Pictures acquired the distribution rights to the film in 2024. It was given a video on demand and limited theatrical release on June 27, 2025.

== Reception ==
On the review aggregator website Rotten Tomatoes, 33% of 18 critics' reviews are positive, with an average rating of 4.5/10.

In a negative review, Glenn Kenny of The New York Times wrote, "Turkiewicz apes Tarantino's great film by giving chapter titles to its sections and setting multiple scenes in a diner. These sequences don't resemble Pulp Fiction so much as they do television ads for Chili's — a locale where you'll have a better time than watching this utterly misbegotten movie."

Calum Cooper of In Their Own League was particularly scathing of the film, criticising the characters, humour and lack of creativity in the film's attempts to pay homage to Tarantino. He wrote, "Stealing Pulp Fiction is one of the worst comedies of recent memory; a film that may incentivise you into following its putrid characters’ lead and stealing the digital print to spare innocents from its awfulness."

Conversely, Ethan Padgett of Film Threat gave the film a score of 9 out of 10 and wrote, "Danny Turkiewicz delivers a funny and delightfully odd film. Jon Rudnitsky and Karan Soni make a great duo as Jonathan and Steve. Jason Alexander shows off his comedic chops as Dr. Mendelbaum and brings his Seinfeldian energy to the film. Joshua Allen's cinematography has a painterly quality and recalls the rich colors seen in films of the 1970s."

Andrew Murray of The Upcoming was also positive, giving the film three out of five stars and writing, "Fully embracing its offbeat humour, Turkiewicz's film is more Napoleon Dynamite than Reservoir Dogs, and it works."

== See also ==
- Stealing Tarantino - a 2006 Russian miniseries with a similar premise.
