= I Love You Forever =

- Theatrical release poster
- Directed by: Cazzie David; Elisa Kalani
- Written by: Cazzie David; Elisa Kalani
- Produced by: Diablo Cody; Lauren Hantz; Liana Weston; Mason Novick; Evan Silverberg; Billy Mulligan
- Starring: Sofia Black-D'Elia; Ray Nicholson; Cazzie David; Raymond Cham Jr.; Jon Rudnitsky
- Cinematography: Christine Ng
- Edited by: Autumn Dea
- Music by: Michael Penn
- Production companies: Entertainment 360; Hantz Motion Pictures; MXN Entertainment
- Distributed by: Utopia
- Release dates: March 9, 2024 (SXSW); February 7, 2025 (United States)
- Running time: 89 minutes
- Country: United States
- Language: English
- Box office: $12,989

I Love You Forever is a 2024 American comedy drama film written and directed by Cazzie David and Elisa Kalani and starring Sofia Black-D'Elia, Ray Nicholson and Cazzie David.

The film premiered at South by Southwest on March 9, 2024 and was released in the United States on February 7, 2025. It received mixed reviews from critics.

== Plot ==
Mackenzie is a college law student who lives with two roommates, Ally and Lucas. One day, she meets a young man named Finn who works as a newscaster, and they hit it off. They go on a romantic first date and proceed to enter into a relationship. Things go well at first, and Finn declares his love for Mackenzie over a news broadcast. Eventually, however, Finn displays many unsavory characteristics, including insecurity, neediness, manipulativeness, and self-righteousness, as well as increasingly critical behavior. Mackenzie remains conciliatory towards Finn, though, and forgives the toxic aspects of his personality. One day, Mackenzie runs into an old hookup of hers named Jake, and she semi-reluctantly gives him her new phone number. Finn discovers this and goes into a rage, even threatening to commit suicide. This leads to Mackenzie and Finn splitting up. Mackenzie is upset and blames herself for the breakup. One night, she watches Finn make a news broadcast, and finds him professing his love for a new woman on air (just as he had done for Mackenzie). Mackenzie reacts incredulously.

== Cast ==
- Sofia Black-D'Elia as Mackenzie
- Ray Nicholson as Finn
- Jon Rudnitsky as Lucas
- Cazzie David as Ally
- Raymond Cham Jr. as Jake
- Oliver Cooper as Harrison
- Ashley Marie Jones as Hotel Manager

== Release ==
The film premiered at South by Southwest on March 9, 2024. It was released in the United States on February 7, 2025.

== Reception ==
On the review aggregator website Rotten Tomatoes, 78% of 23 critics' reviews are positive. Metacritic, which uses a weighted average, assigned the film a score of 72 out of 100, based on four critics, indicating "generally favorable" reviews.

Samantha Bergeson of IndieWire graded the film a B+. Stephen Saito of Variety gave the film a positive review, calling it "a fresh take on a toxic relationship." Fletcher Peters of The Daily Beast also gave the film a positive review and wrote, "If that is the goal, as sad as it may be, then it is successful; this is a feel-bad movie." Brian Tallerico of RogerEbert.com gave the film a negative review and wrote, "...this is a movie that wears out its welcome early, spinning around the same relationship ideas, and, worst of all, failing to give its lead enough character depth to justify spending so much time with her."
