= Chris Parnell =

American actor (born 1967)

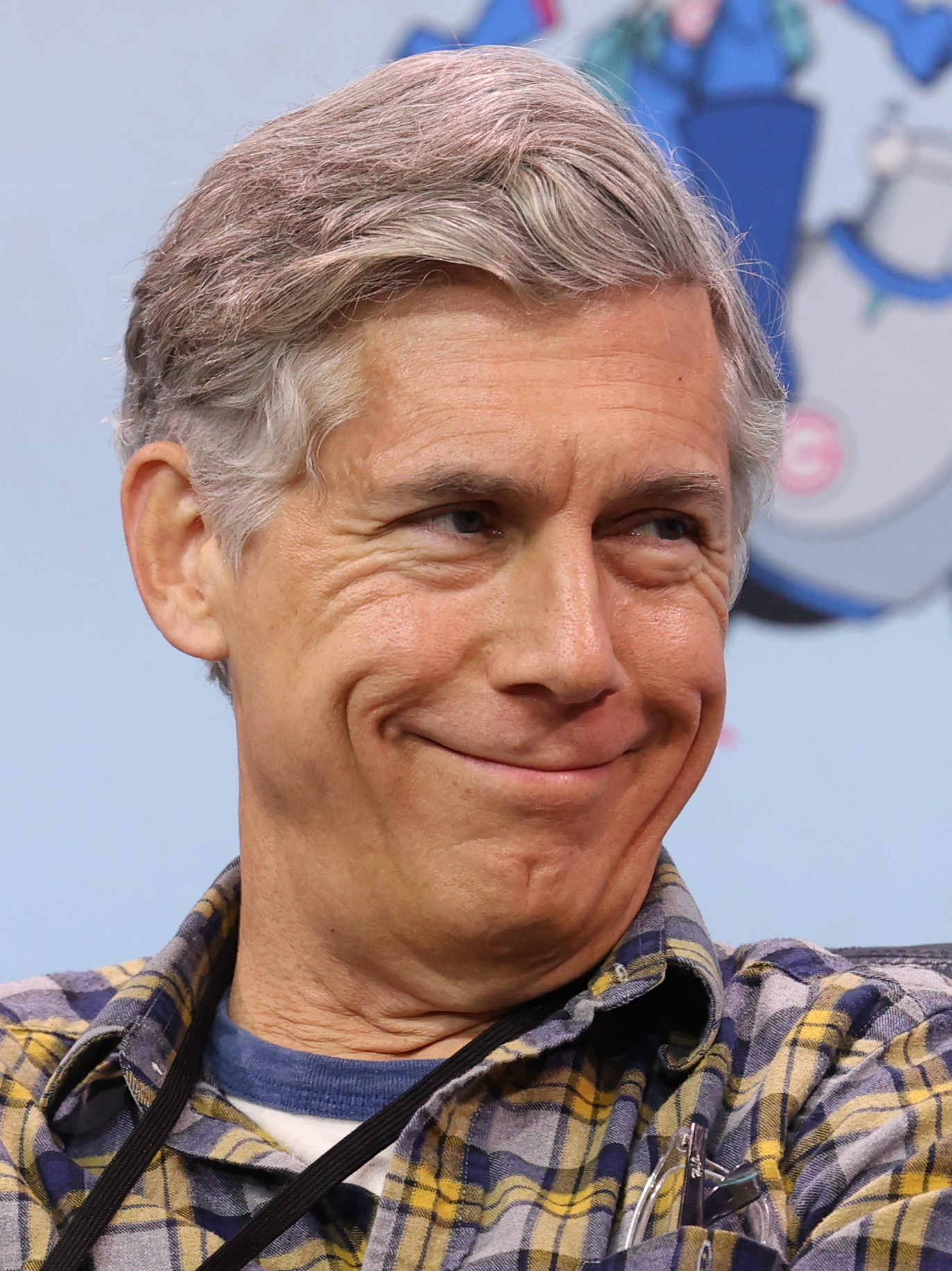
- Parnell in 2024
- Born: Thomas Christopher Parnell; February 5, 1967 (age 59); Memphis, Tennessee, U.S.
- Education: University of North Carolina School of the Arts (BFA)
- Occupations: Actor; comedian
- Years active: 1988–present
- Known for: 30 Rock; Saturday Night Live; Archer; Rick and Morty
- Children: 2

Thomas Christopher Parnell (/pɑːrˈnɛl/ par-NELL; born February 5, 1967) is an American actor and comedian. First breaking through as a performer with the Los Angeles comedy troupe The Groundlings, Parnell found wider success during his tenure as a cast member on the NBC sketch comedy series Saturday Night Live from 1998 to 2006. After leaving SNL, he played the role of Dr. Leo Spaceman on the NBC sitcom 30 Rock (2006–2013). Parnell is also a prominent voice actor known for his deep and distinctive voice. In animation, he voices the narrator on the PBS Kids series WordGirl (2007–2015), Cyril Figgis on the FX series Archer (2009–2023), Jerry Smith on Adult Swim's Rick and Morty (2013–present), and Doug on Fox's Family Guy (2019–2022). His work also extends into commercials, having voiced the Hamburger Helper mascot "Lefty", appeared in advertisements as "America's Dad" for Orbit Gum, and voiced "The Progressive Box" in a series of advertisements by the Progressive Corporation.

== Early life ==
Parnell was born in Memphis, Tennessee, and adopted by a Southern Baptist family. His father, Jack Parnell, was a radio personality in Memphis. He attended the Southern Baptist Educational Center, and graduated from Germantown High School. He decided to pursue acting as a career at age 17 and set his sights on being a theater actor. He attended the University of North Carolina School of the Arts where he received his BFA in Drama. He moved to Houston, Texas after college to do an apprentice actor program for a season at the Alley Theatre, but did not get asked back to join the company. He became temporarily disenchanted with acting, and returned to his hometown and taught acting, film, and video at his alma mater, Germantown High School, for a year. In 1992, he moved to Los Angeles where he worked at FAO Schwarz for five years and took classes at the Groundlings.

== Career ==
While performing as a company player with the Groundlings for a number of years, Parnell began doing commercials and getting guest roles on various sitcoms, such as Seinfeld, Friends, and Murphy Brown. He was hired to join the cast of Saturday Night Live as a featured player, and debuted on the show on September 26, 1998. He was promoted to repertory player the following season. In the summer of 2001, because of budget cuts and the hiring of four new cast members, Lorne Michaels was required to dismiss two cast members; he chose to lay off Parnell and Jerry Minor over Horatio Sanz, Rachel Dratch, and Maya Rudolph. Parnell was rehired in the middle of the following season.

While on SNL, Parnell appeared in numerous sketches and commercial parodies, and performed impressions of various celebrities. Among his notable sketches are "Lazy Sunday", a rap video he shot with Andy Samberg, and "More Cowbell". He has performed raps about hosts Jennifer Garner, Britney Spears, Kirsten Dunst, and Ashton Kutcher. On the DVD commentary for the West Coast version of the 30 Rock episode "Live Show", Tina Fey and Beth McCarthy Miller noted that Parnell was nicknamed "The Ice Man" while working at SNL, because of his apparent immunity to breaking character, citing the "More Cowbell" sketch in which he was the only actor not to break.

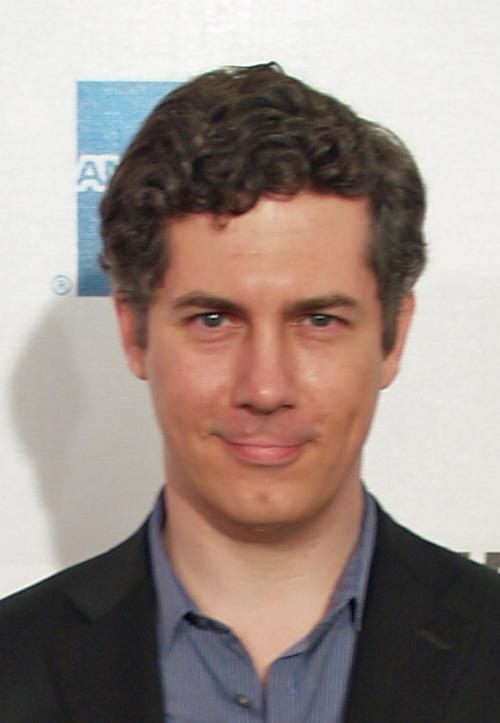
Parnell at the 2007 Tribeca Film Festival

In 2006, Michaels laid off Parnell, as well as Horatio Sanz and Finesse Mitchell, due to budget cuts. This effectively made Parnell the only SNL performer to have been released twice by Michaels, although Parnell said in a 2008 interview with The Sound of Young America that he was okay with being let go this time, as he was considering leaving after that season anyway, adding that he probably would have stayed one more season had he been asked back. He had been with SNL for eight seasons; at the time only four people (Darrell Hammond, Tim Meadows, Kevin Nealon, and Horatio Sanz) had been cast members longer. He has since made uncredited cameo appearances on the show, including parodying newscasters Tom Brokaw, Jim Lehrer, and Bob Schieffer. Parnell and his former SNL castmate Horatio Sanz starred together in Big Lake, a 2010 sitcom on Comedy Central from executive producers Will Ferrell and Adam McKay.

Parnell voiced Fly in the animated films Hotel Transylvania and Hotel Transylvania 2, and Stan the Fishman in Hotel Transylvania 3: Summer Vacation. He is a series regular on the FX animated series Archer, and is also known for his guest appearances as Dr. Leo Spaceman on 30 Rock. He provides the voice of the narrator on the PBS children's series WordGirl. From 2011 to 2014, Parnell co-starred on the ABC comedy series Suburgatory where he played the husband of the character played by his former SNL castmate Ana Gasteyer. His role started out as recurring in the first season but he was bumped up to a series regular in the second season. The series aired for three seasons on ABC.

Parnell provides the voice of the "Progressive Box" in commercials for Progressive Insurance. Since 2013, Parnell has voiced Jerry Smith (and his alternate reality variants) on the Adult Swim series Rick and Morty. On March 16, 2018, Parnell was cast in the main role of Wayne on the CBS sitcom Happy Together.

== Filmography ==
=== Film ===
Year	Title	Role	Notes
1996	Jingle All the Way	Toy Store Sales Clerk	
1996	Shooting Lily	Phone Company Salesman	Voice
1997	Decade of Love	Bobby Fastdancer	Short film
1998	Operation	Cadaver	Short film
1999	Deadtime	Junior	Short film
2000	The Ladies Man	Phil Swanson	
2003	Evil Alien Conquerors	Du-ug	
2003	Down with Love	TV Emcee	
2003	National Lampoon's Barely Legal	Mr. Ronald Greitzer	
2004	Looking for Kitty	Guy Borne	
2004	Anchorman: The Legend of Ron Burgundy	Garth Holliday	
2004	Wake Up, Ron Burgundy: The Lost Movie	Garth Holliday	
2006	I'm Reed Fish	Ralph	
2006	Ira & Abby	Dr. Ronald Silverberg	
2007	The Grand	Harold Melvin	
2007	Hot Rod	Barry Pasternak	
2007	Walk Hard: The Dewey Cox Story	Theo	
2007	Sunny & Share Love You	Kevin Keith Baker	
2007	Kabluey	Frank	
2008	Harold	Coach Vanderpool	
2008	Eavesdrop	Terrence	
2009	Paper Man	Peter	
2009	Labor Pains	Jerry Steinwald	
2010	Hollywood & Wine	Peter West	
2010	The Dogfather	Brian Franks	
2010	Kung Fu Magoo	Cole Fusion, Ninja	Voice
2011	Answer This!	Brian Collins	
2012	21 Jump Street	Mr. Gordon	
2012	The Five-Year Engagement	Bill	
2012	The Dictator	News Anchor	
2012	Hotel Transylvania	Fly	Voice
2013	Escape from Planet Earth	Hammer	Voice
2013	Turbo	Announcer #2	Voice
2013	Anchorman 2: The Legend Continues	Garth Holliday	
2014	Break Point	Jay LaRoche	
2015	The Better Half	Daniel	
2015	Hotel Transylvania 2	Fly	Voice
2015	Sisters	Phil	
2015	The Ridiculous 6	William (Bank Teller)	
2017	Austin Found	Alan Dickinson	
2017	Battle of the Sexes	DJ	
2018	Life of the Party	Wayne Truzack	
2018	Hotel Transylvania 3: Summer Vacation	Stan, Fish Men	Voice
2018	Slice	Mayor Tracy	
2018	Goosebumps 2: Haunted Halloween	Walter	
2019	The Last Laugh	Charlie Green	
2019	A Name Without a Place	Jerry Sundall	
2019	The Laundromat	Doomed Gringo #2	
2019	I Am Woman	Artie Mogull	
2021	Finding ʻOhana	Brown	
2021	Home Sweet Home Alone	Uncle Stu Mercer	
2022	Senior Year	Jim Conway	
2022	Chip 'n Dale: Rescue Rangers	Dave Bollinari	
2022	Night at the Museum: Kahmunrah Rises Again	George Washington	Voice
2023	As We Know It	Ted Sommers	
2023	Milennial Hunter	John	Voice
2024	Micro Budget	Toby	
2024	In Fidelity	Lyle Ayker	
2024	Our Little Secret	Veterinarian	
2025	Mimics	Jack Conrad	
2025	A Loud House Christmas Movie: Naughty or Nice	Gerald	Voice
2026	Lorne	Narrator	Documentary
2026	Stop! That! Train!	Conductor Davenport	
2026	The Dink	Neil	
2026	Hexed †	TBA	Voice

=== Television ===
Year	Title	Role	Notes
1996	Hope and Gloria	Howard	Episode: "Sit Down, You're Rockin' the Funicular"
1996, 1998	Suddenly Susan	Phil, Waiter	2 episodes
1997	Seinfeld	NBC Executive	Episode: "The Butter Shave"
1997	The Jamie Foxx Show	Director	Episode: "Do the Write Thing"
1997	Nick Freno: Licensed Teacher	Announcer	Episode: "The Weighting Game"
1998	Union Square	Don	Episode: "It Takes a Thief"
1998	Caroline in the City	Gene	Episode: "Caroline and the Cabbie"
1998	Murphy Brown	Handler #2	2 episodes
1998	Conrad Bloom	Simpson	2 episodes
1998–2012	Saturday Night Live	Various	148 episodes
2001	TV Funhouse	James Brolin	Voice, episode: "Safari Day"
2001	The Hughleys	Rick	Episode: "When Darryl Bumped Sally"
2001	Friends	Bob	Episode: "The One with Rachel's Date"
2002	Ed	DJ Curtis Morris	Episode: "The Divorce"
2003	As Told by Ginger	Radio Announcer, Train Conductor	Voice, episode: "Far from Home"
2006–13	30 Rock	Dr. Leo Spaceman	25 episodes
2007–15	WordGirl	Narrator, Meatloaf, Exposition Guy, Sergeant Henderson, Museum Guard, Mazo-Racer Driver, additional voices	Voice, 130 episodes
2008	Miss Guided	Vice Principal Bruce Terry	7 episodes
2008	Saturday Night Live Weekend Update Thursday	Bob Schieffer, Tom Brokaw	2 episodes
2009	Kröd Mändoon and the Flaming Sword of Fire	Narrator	Voice, 5 episodes
2009–10	Glenn Martin, DDS	Various voices	4 episodes
2009–23	Archer	Cyril Figgis, Buck Henry, Siegbert Fuchs	Voice, 127 episodes
2010	Better Off Ted	Walter Palmer	Episode: "The Impertence of Communicationizing"
2010	The Life & Times of Tim	Mark Douglas, Principal, William	Voice, 3 episodes
2010	Big Lake	Chris Henkel	10 episodes
2010–11	Funny or Die Presents	Various	6 episodes
2010–11	Eureka	Dr. Noah Drummer	2 episodes
2010–21	Tayo the Little Bus	Citu	Voice, English dub
2011	Fish Hooks	Allibut, Announcer, Gecko Schoolmaster	Voice, 2 episodes
2011	Robot Chicken	Scooter, Major Nelson	Voice, episode: "Big Trouble in Little Clerks 2"
2011	Mad Love	Officer Dennis Barrett	2 episodes
2011	Workaholics	Bruce Benson	Episode: "In the Line of Getting Fired"
2011	Jon Benjamin Has a Van	Area 51 Scientist	Episode: "Stardoor"
2011	Love Bites	Chad Banks	Episode: "Stand and Deliver"
2011	Curb Your Enthusiasm	Hank	Episode: "The Hero"
2011	Prep & Landing: Naughty vs. Nice	Mr. Thistleton	Voice, television special
2011	T.U.F.F. Puppy	Caped Cod	Voice, episode: "The Dog Who Cried Fish"
2011–12	I Just Want My Pants Back	JB	6 episodes
2011–14	Suburgatory	Fred Shay	38 episodes
2012	Gravity Falls	Additional voices	2 episodes
2012	Electric City	Giovanni Montalbon	Voice, 20 episodes
2012–16	Comedy Bang! Bang!	Various	4 episodes
2013–19	Drunk History	Various	6 episodes
2013–present	Rick and Morty	Jerry Smith	Voice, main role
2014	Filthy Preppy Teen$	Sean Hastings	Television special
2014	The Tom and Jerry Show	Narrator	Voice, episode: "Sleep Disorder/Tom's In-Tents Adventure"
2014	Glee	Mario	Episode: "Opening Night"
2014	Garfunkel and Oates	Stan	Episode: "Rule 34"
2014	BoJack Horseman	Klaus, News Reporter	Voice, episode: "Our A-Story is a 'D' Story"
2014	Bad Judge	Douglas Riller	Episode: "Pilot"
2014	Benched	Mitch	Episode: "Campaign Contributions"
2014	AJ's Infinite Summer	Dad	Cartoon Network short
2014–16	TripTank	Various voices	7 episodes
2015	Brooklyn Nine-Nine	Geoffrey Hoytsman	2 episodes
2015	Penn Zero: Part-Time Hero	Judge	Voice, episode: "Defending the Earth"
2015	Childrens Hospital	Ron Pippin	Episode: "Five Years Later"
2015	Randy Cunningham: 9th Grade Ninja	Charlie Clucker	Voice, episode: "McCluckerbusters"
2015	The Adventures of OG Sherlock Kush	Prime Minister	Voice, episode: "The Mystery of the Royal Flasher"
2015	The Spoils Before Dying	Bebop Jones	2 episodes
2015	Another Period	Sigmund Freud	Episode: "Senate"
2015	Jeff Dunham: Unhinged in Hollywood	Network Executive	Television special
2015	Be Cool, Scooby-Doo!	Dustin Wallswreath, Jim McCoy, Cop	Voice, episode: "Grand Scam"
2015	Highston	Wilbur Liggetts	Episode: "Pilot"
2015–16	Dawn of the Croods	Snoot, Dub, Evil Egg	Voice, 12 episodes
2015–17	The Mr. Peabody & Sherman Show	Mr. Peabody	Voice, main role
2015–24	Nature Cat	Various voices	41 episodes
2016	Sofia the First	Zacharias	Voice, episode: "Her Royal Spyness"
2016	Bob's Burgers	Warren Fitzgerald	Voice, episode: "Pro Tiki/Con Tiki"
2016	Ask the StoryBots	Reindeer	Voice, episode: "Where Does Rain Come From?"
2016	Tween Fest	Preston Stevens Sr.	Episode: "SpurgeExplosion"
2016	Rhett and Link's Buddy System	Vice Chairman	Episode: "The Magic Is Real"
2016–20	Elena of Avalor	Migs	Voice, 22 episodes
2016–22	Inside Amy Schumer	Michael / HR Manager Bob	3 episodes
2016–26	American Dad!	James A. Garfield's clone, additional voices	24 episodes
2017	Michael Bolton's Big, Sexy Valentine's Day Special	Dr. Vince Harbert	Television special
2017	Elena and the Secret of Avalor	Migs	Voice, television film
2017	Samurai Jack	Mud Alien, Beetle Drone Scientist	Voice, episode: "XCIII"
2017	Black-ish	Dean Parker	Episode: "Liberal Arts"
2017	Great News	Gerald	Episode: "Squad Feud"
2017, 2020	Unbreakable Kimmy Schmidt	Junior	2 episodes
2018, 2024	Blaze and the Monster Machines	Cousins Ken and Sven	Voice, 2 episodes
2018	Adam Ruins Everything	Narrator	6 episodes
2018	Grown-ish	Dean Parker	10 episodes (main role; season 1)
2018–19	Happy Together	Wayne	Main role
2019	Miracle Workers	God's Dad	Episode: "1 Day"
2019	Bajillion Dollar Propertie$	Walton Rothchild	Episode: "Held Breath"
2019–20	The Goldbergs	Harrison Whitby	2 episodes
2019–20	Will & Grace	Dr. DiLorenzo	2 episodes
2019–20	Bless the Harts	Ian David Col	Voice, 2 episodes
2019–22	Family Guy	Doug, additional voices	Voice, 25 episodes
2019–25	Love, Death & Robots	The Cat, Sanchez	Voice, 3 episodes
2020	Dummy	Chet Jacobs	Episode: "Plus Size Plus One"
2020	Close Enough	Ron	Episode: "First Date/Snailin' It"
2020	At Home with Amy Sedaris	Chug Ducey	Episode: "New Year's"
2020	Mapleworth Murders	Ben Canelli	2 episodes
2020	The Simpsons	Mary Tannenbaum's Fiancé	Voice, episode: "A Springfield Summer Christmas for Christmas"
2021	Archibald's Next Big Thing Is Here!	Dr. Fluffberg	Voice, 5 episodes
2021	M.O.D.O.K.	Alvin Healy / Tenpin	Voice, episode: "If Saturday Be... for the Boys!"
2021–22	Dogs in Space	Ed	Voice, 20 episodes
2021–23	Alpha Betas	Darryl	Voice, 2 episodes
2022	The Mysterious Benedict Society	Captain of the Inverness	2 episodes
2022–23	Last Week Tonight with John Oliver	HOA Ambassador / Voice Over	2 episodes
2023–present	My Adventures with Superman	Slade Wilson	Voice, 11 episodes
2023–24	Hailey's On It!	Various voices	3 episodes
2024	Fallout	Overseer Benjamin	2 episodes
2024–25	Krapopolis	Ares	Voice, 3 episodes
2025	Oh My God… Yes!	Ted (voice)	Episode: "Steel Ball Sounds Like a Very Dangerous Game"
2026	Rock Paper Scissors	Parchment Paper (voice)	Episode: "Paper's Family Get-Together"
2026	Life, Larry and the Pursuit of Unhappiness	Benjamin Franklin	Episode: "Livingston"
2026	The Hawk	Anton	

=== Video games ===
Year	Title	Voice role
2014	Rick and Morty: Jerry's Game	Jerry Smith
2016–present	Pocket Mortys	Jerry Smith
2017	Rick and Morty: Virtual Rick-ality	Jerry Smith
2019	Grand Theft Auto Online: Diamond Casino & Resort update	Tom Connors
2020	Maneater	Trip Westhaven (Narrator / Host)

=== Music videos ===
Year	Song title	Album	Notes
2005	"Lazy Sunday"	Incredibad	Performed on Saturday Night Live
2012	"Lazy Sunday 2"	N/A	Performed on Saturday Night Live

=== Audio ===
Year	Title	Role	Author	Production company
2021	Batman: The Audio Adventures	Narrator	Dennis McNicholas	Blue Ribbon Content
