= Sticky Fingers (1988 film) =

- Directed by: Catlin Adams
- Written by: Catlin Adams; Melanie Mayron
- Produced by: Catlin Adams; Sam Irvin; Melanie Mayron; Carl Clifford; Jonathan Olsberg
- Starring: Helen Slater; Melanie Mayron; Christopher Guest; Danitra Vance; Shirley Stoler; Eileen Brennan; Carol Kane
- Cinematography: Gary Thieltges
- Edited by: Robert Reitano
- Music by: Gary Chang
- Production company: Hightop Productions
- Distributed by: International Spectrafilm; Media Home Entertainment; Top Tape; Video Treasures
- Release date: May 6, 1988
- Running time: 97 minutes
- Country: United States
- Language: English

Sticky Fingers is a 1988 film directed by Catlin Adams, who co-wrote the film with Melanie Mayron. The film stars Helen Slater and Mayron.

== Premise ==
Two young, unflappable street musicians are entrusted with a bag of drug money, and immediately set about spending it. Hijinks and shopping montages ensue.

== Cast ==
- Helen Slater as Hattie
- Melanie Mayron as Lolly
- Adam Shaw as Jean-Marc
- Shirley Stoler as Reeba
- Danitra Vance as Evanston
- Paul Calderón as Speed
- Eileen Brennan as Stella
- Carol Kane as Kitty
- Loretta Devine as Diane
- George Buza as Policeman
- Stephen McHattie as Eddie
- Christopher Guest as Sam
- Gwen Welles as Marcie

== Reception ==
Critical reviews were mixed.
