= As We Know It (film) =

2023 zombie apocalypse, romantic comedy

- Directed by: Josh Monkarsh
- Written by: Brandon DePaolo; Christopher Francis; Josh Monkarsh
- Produced by: Daniel Cummings; Joshua Fruehling; K. Asher Levin; Josh Monkarsh
- Starring: Mike Castle; Oliver Cooper; Taylor Blackwell; Pam Grier; Chris Parnell
- Cinematography: Stephen St. Peter
- Edited by: Yvonne Valdez; Rebecca Weigold
- Music by: Michl Britsch
- Production companies: Traffic City Productions; Revisilagi VFX Studio
- Distributed by: Buffalo 8
- Release dates: May 13, 2023 (Pendance Film Festival); November 10, 2023 (Theatrical)
- Running time: 84 minutes
- Country: United States
- Language: English

As We Know It is a 2023 American zombie horror romantic comedy film directed by Josh Monkarsh and starring Mike Castle, Oliver Cooper, Taylor Blackwell, Pam Grier and Chris Parnell. The film follows James Bishop (Castle), a struggling writer who tries to survive a zombie apocalypse with his best friend Bruce (Cooper) and ex-girlfriend Emily (Blackwell).

As We Know It premiered at the Pendance Film Festival in Canada on May 13, 2023, and received a limited theatrical release by Buffalo 8 on November 10, 2023.

== Synopsis ==
The film's official synopsis reads:

Set in Los Angeles in the late 1990s, struggling writer James Bishop grapples with the emotional shrapnel of a recent breakup with his longtime girlfriend, Emily. As James holds up in his Hollywood Hills home with writer's block, his eccentric best friend Bruce shows up with bad news. The city has plunged into chaos by an unusual and hilarious zombie outbreak, courtesy of tainted soy milk.
With the streets of Los Angeles swarming with the undead, James, Bruce, and Emily come together to barricade themselves in the house while reconciling their personal struggles. And occasionally, letting in the only food delivery service still operating, Abracadabra.

== Cast ==
- Mike Castle as James Bishop
- Oliver Cooper as Bruce
- Taylor Blackwell as Emily
- Danny Mondello as Rory
- Chris Parnell as Ted Sommers
- Pam Grier as Ms. Jones

== Development ==
Monkarsh optioned the script for As We Know It in 2016. The original script did not feature zombies and Monkarsh came up with the idea to include them while "spitballing ideas" with Christopher Francis. They did not approach the script again until the COVID-19 pandemic occurred and Monkarsh noticed that he believed that he had "something here with all the quarantining stuff that’s happening". The crew substantially re-wrote the script but allowed the cast to see it as a foundation and to freely improv.

Filming began in Los Angeles, California during July 2022.

== Release ==
As We Know It premiered at the Pendance Film Festival in Canada on May 13, 2023. It was acquired by production and distribution company Buffalo 8 and given a theatrical release on November 10, 2023. This was followed by a release to streaming and video-on-demand on November 30 of the same year.

== Reception ==
On the review aggregator website Rotten Tomatoes, 50% of 10 critics' reviews are positive.

Film Threat reviewed the movie, noting that the film "hits a lot of the expected beats of a zombie comedy" while also praising the characters, makeup, cast, and its ending. Andy Klein and Manuel Betancourt reviewed it for KPCC, both criticizing it and Klein stating that "It feels almost improvised... and unfortunately not that well improvised."
