= Cazzie David =

American scriptwriter and actress (born 1994)

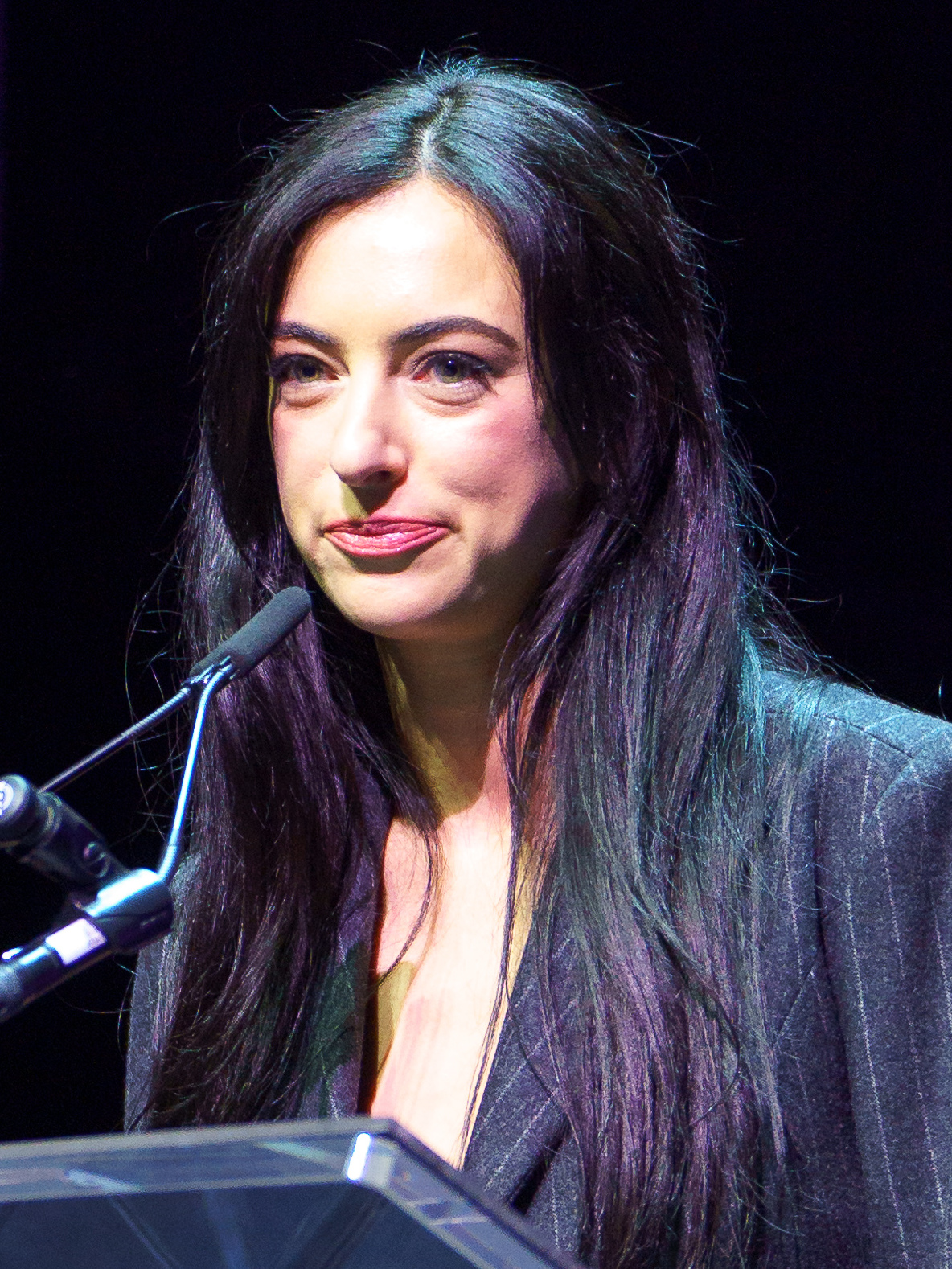
- David at SXSW 2024
- Born: May 10, 1994 (age 32)
- Education: Emerson College (BA)
- Occupations: Scriptwriter; actress
- Years active: 2007; 2016–present
- Parents: Larry David (father); Laurie David (mother)

Cazzie Laurel David (born May 10, 1994) is an American scriptwriter and actress. David co-created and co-starred in the web series Eighty-Sixed (2017). Her first collection of essays No One Asked For This was released in 2020. She also appears in the third season of Netflix's The Umbrella Academy.

== Early life and education ==
David was born in 1994 to comedian and Seinfeld co-creator Larry David and environmental activist and film producer Laurie David. Her family is Jewish. She has one younger sister named Romy David. David earned a Bachelor of Arts degree in writing for film and television from Emerson College in 2016.

== Career ==
David and co-writer Elisa Kalani created the web series Eighty-Sixed, which ran for eight episodes. David and Kalani then developed Half-Empty for Amazon Prime Video. The show was picked up for a pilot episode in 2019, but ultimately was not developed into a series.

David released the collection of essays No One Asked For This in 2020, which reached No. 2 on The New York Times Paperback Nonfiction Best Sellers List.

David also played a supporting role in the feature film I Love You Forever (2024), which she co-wrote and co-directed with Elisa Kalani.

== Personal life ==
David dated comedian Pete Davidson for two and a half years until 2018.

== Filmography ==
=== Film ===
Year	Title	Role	Notes
2024	I Love You Forever	Ally	Also co-writer and co-director
2024	Adult Best Friends	Roxy	
2024	Stealing Pulp Fiction	Elizabeth	

=== Television ===
Year	Title	Role	Notes
2007	Hannah Montana	Herself	Episode: "My Best Friend's Boyfriend"
2016	CollegeHumor Originals	Student	Episode: "The Secret Behind Every Actress's Red Carpet Pose"
2017	Eighty-Sixed	Remi	8 episodes; also writer, director and executive producer
2022	The Umbrella Academy	Jayme Hargreeves / Sparrow Number Six	Recurring role (season 3)
