= Brave New Jersey =

2016 comedy film surrounding the 1938 "War of the Worlds" radio broadcast

- Theatrical release poster
- Directed by: Jody Lambert
- Written by: Michael Dowling; Jody Lambert
- Produced by: Jen Roskind; Taylor Williams
- Starring: Tony Hale; Anna Camp; Sam Jaeger; Heather Burns; Dan Bakkedahl; Raymond J. Barry
- Cinematography: Corey Walter
- Edited by: Matthew Diezel
- Music by: Dennis Lambert; Matthew Logan Vasquez; Kelly Winrich
- Production company: The Shot Clock
- Distributed by: Gravitas Ventures
- Release dates: October 15, 2016 (Austin Film Festival); August 4, 2017 (United States)
- Running time: 86 minutes
- Country: United States
- Language: English
- Box office: $16,500

Brave New Jersey is a 2016 American comedy film directed by Jody Lambert, who also served as co-writer, with Michael Dowling. The film stars Tony Hale, Anna Camp, Sam Jaeger, Heather Burns, Dan Bakkedahl and Raymond J. Barry. The film was released on August 4, 2017, by Gravitas Ventures.

It takes place on the day/night of "The War of the Worlds" broadcast on October 30–31, 1938, and shows how a small New Jersey town reacts to what they thought was an impending alien invasion. The town of Lullaby, New Jersey is fictional, though the story incorporates some real-life elements, such as many listeners' panicked reactions to the broadcast, and the existence of the Rotolactor cow-milking machine.

== Cast ==
- Tony Hale as Clark Hill
- Anna Camp as Peg Prickett
- Sam Jaeger as Paul Davison
- Heather Burns as Lorraine Davison
- Dan Bakkedahl as Reverend Ray Rogers
- Raymond J. Barry as Captain Ambrose P. Collins
- Erika Alexander as Helen Holbrook
- Mel Rodriguez as Sheriff Dandy
- Evan Jonigkeit as Sparky
- Grace Kaufman as Ann Davison
- Matt Oberg as Chardy Edwards
- Leonard Earl Howze as Stan Holbrook
- Noah Lomax as Peter
- Adina Galupa as Shannon
- Jack Landry as Neighbor Del
- Harp Sandman as Ziggy
- Bill Coelius as Mac
- Gabriel Landis as Jimmy
- Patrick Miller as Mr. Pepper

== Release ==
The film premiered at the Austin Film Festival on October 15, 2016. It was released on August 4, 2017, by Gravitas Ventures.

== Reception ==
On Metacritic the film has a score of 45 out of 100, indicating "mixed or average" reviews. On Rotten Tomatoes it has a score of 50%.
