= Kenneth Lonergan =

American film director, playwright, and screenwriter (born 1962)

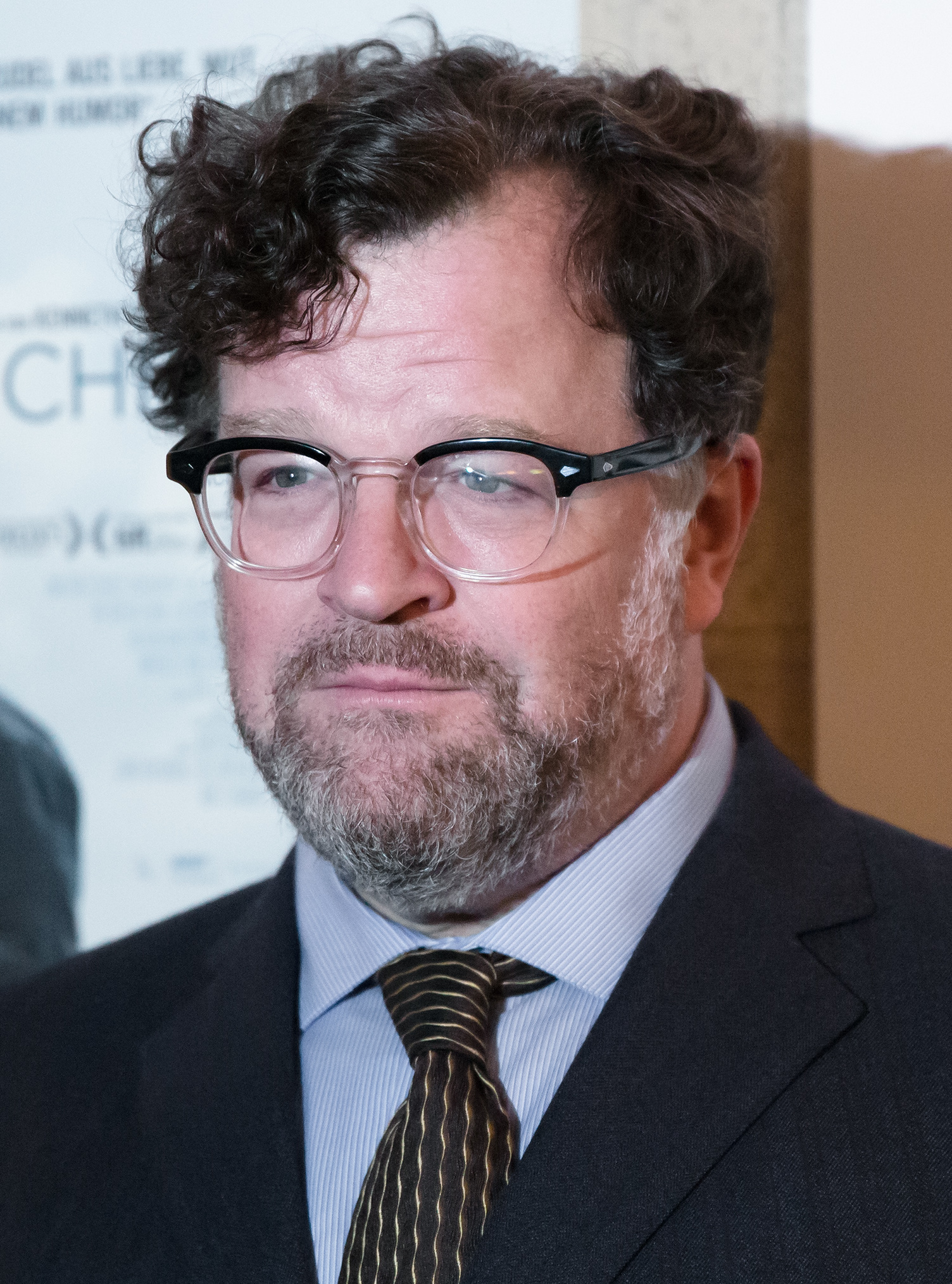
- Lonergan at the Vienna International Film Festival in 2016
- Born: October 16, 1962 (age 64); New York City, U.S.
- Education: Wesleyan University; New York University (BFA)
- Occupations: Playwright; screenwriter; film director
- Spouse: J. Smith-Cameron (m. 2000)
- Children: 1
- Writing career
- Period: 1982–present
- Notable awards: Full list

Kenneth Lonergan (born October 16, 1962) is an American playwright, screenwriter and film director, and actor. He is known for his works which explore complex emotional and interpersonal dynamics. He has received several awards including an Academy Award and a BAFTA Award as well as nominations for three Golden Globe Awards, a Pulitzer Prize, a Laurence Olivier Award, and a Tony Award.

In 1982 Lonergan wrote his first one-act play, The Rennings Children. He then earned acclaim for a string of off-Broadway plays, including This is Our Youth (1996), The Waverly Gallery (2000), and Lobby Hero (2001), which were later revived on Broadway. For his work on The Waverly Gallery, he was selected as a finalist for the Pulitzer Prize for Drama as well as was nominated for Tony Award for Best Revival of a Play in 2019.

He directed and wrote the drama film Manchester by the Sea (2016) which won him the Academy Award for Best Original Screenplay as well as a nomination for the Academy Award for Best Director. He was previously Oscar-nominated as a writer for his first film You Can Count on Me (2000) and as a co-writer for Martin Scorsese's historical epic film Gangs of New York (2002). He also wrote and directed the psychological drama film Margaret (2011), and adapted the E.M. Forster novel Howards End into the 2017 miniseries of the same name.

== Early life and education ==
Lonergan was born in the Bronx, New York City to a mother who was a psychiatrist and father who was a physician. His mother is Jewish, and his father was of Irish descent. He began studying writing in high school at the Walden School, a highly progressive private school in Manhattan with a strong drama program (the school is now defunct).

His first play, The Rennings Children, was chosen for Young Playwrights, Inc., founded by Stephen Sondheim. The selection for the festival came in 1982, while he was still an undergraduate. Lonergan matriculated to Wesleyan University in Middletown, Connecticut, where he trained as a playwright and director. He graduated from the NYU Playwriting Program. He is an alumnus of HB Studio in Greenwich Village, Manhattan, and a founding member of Naked Angels. After graduating from NYU in Greenwich Village, Lonergan worked as a speechwriter for the U.S. Environmental Protection Agency. He also wrote industrial shows (long-play commercials) for clients including Weight Watchers.

== Career ==
=== 1980–1999: Early success off-Broadway ===
Lonergan's first theatrical success came with the play This Is Our Youth (1996) which opened off-Broadway Intar Theatre by The New Group. The play revolved around three young adults navigating friendship, identity, and disillusionment in 1980s New York City. The cast included Mark Ruffalo, Josh Hamilton, and Missy Yager and was directed by Mark Brokaw. Greg Evans of Variety wrote, "What we have is two hours of conversation among the three characters, and as finely written as the dialogue is" adding, "Lonergan’s ear is unfailing".

Lonergan's breakthrough play, The Waverly Gallery (2000), based on his grandmother's Greenwich Village gallery, revolves around a family reacting to an elderly woman in early stages of dementia. The original cast included Eileen Heckart, Josh Hamilton, Maureen Anderman, and Mark Blum. It opened Off-Broadway at the Promenade Theater in March 2000 directed by Scott Ellis. Charles Isherwood of Variety declared, "Anyone who has lived through this sad process with a relative will be awed by the verisimilitude of both Heckart's acting and Lonergan's writing." For his work he was named as a finalist for the Pulitzer Prize for Drama.

Lonergan's film career started with his screenplay for the crime comedy Analyze This (1999) starring Robert De Niro and Billy Crystal as a gangster and his therapist, respectively.

=== 2000–2009: Transition to film ===
Lonergan directed his own screenplay for You Can Count on Me (2000) which was executive produced by Martin Scorsese. The film starred Laura Linney and Mark Ruffalo, earning Lonergan a nomination for the Academy Award for Best Original Screenplay. He was subsequently offered a job writing the live-action comedy The Adventures of Rocky and Bullwinkle (2000).

In 2001 he wrote the play Lobby Hero which premiered off-Broadway at Playwrights Horizons starring Glenn Fitzgerald, Heather Burns, and Tate Donovan. In 2002, Lonergan contributed to the screenplay for Martin Scorsese's historical epic Gangs of New York (2002) for which he earned his second nomination for the Academy Award for Best Original Screenplay.

In 2005, filming took place for his second film as writer/director, Margaret, starring Anna Paquin, Matt Damon, Matthew Broderick, and J. Smith-Cameron. The film was in post-production for over five years, with Lonergan, the producers and various editors unable to agree on its final cut, resulting in multiple legal disputes. It was finally released in 2011. Margaret ranked 31st in a 2016 BBC poll of the 21st century's greatest films. His play The Starry Messenger premiered Off-Broadway in 2009 and starred his wife J. Smith-Cameron, Matthew Broderick, and Kieran Culkin.

=== 2010–present: Career expansion ===
In August 2014, This Is Our Youth was revived on Broadway starring Michael Cera, Kieran Culkin, and Tavi Gevinson at the Cort Theatre. The play would be the first of Lonergan's work to make it to Broadway. He received a nomination for the Tony Award for Best Revival of a Play. Alexis Soloski of The Guardian wrote, "Though still hewing to drama school rules–small cast, single set, neat inciting incident–it has a mature, post-grad voice, sensitive and humane and jammed full of totally splendid crackerjack-with-a-toy-surprise dialogue".

Lonergan wrote and directed the drama film Manchester by the Sea (2016) starring Casey Affleck, Lucas Hedges, and Michelle Williams, which was released to critical acclaim. He also had a small part in the film, as a pedestrian. David Fear of Rolling Stone said the film proves that Lonergan is "practically peerless in portraying loss as a living, breathing thing without resorting to the vocabulary of griefporn." He was nominated for the Academy Award for Best Director and received the Academy Award for Best Original Screenplay for the film. He also won the BAFTA Award for Best Original Screenplay for Manchester by the Sea at the 70th British Academy Film Awards. That same year he wrote the play Hold On to Me Darling (2016) which starred Timothy Olyphant as a country music star and ran at the Atlantic Theatre Company's Linda Gross Theatre.

Lonergan adapted the E.M. Forster novel Howards End into a 2017 miniseries of the same name for BBC/Starz starring Hayley Atwell and Matthew Macfadyen. When addressing the challenges of adapting the novel to screen he told The Times of London, “You don’t want to be apologizing for a book that was written in 1910, nor do you want to be writing material whose main purpose is to tell the audience that you don’t agree with these views".

In March 2018, a second play of his, Lobby Hero was revived on Broadway, this time starring Chris Evans, Michael Cera, Brian Tyree Henry, and Bel Powley at the Helen Hayes Theatre. Leah Greenblatt of Entertainment Weekly wrote, "Lobby is still a smart, thoughtful piece of work, fairy-dusted by the starry presence of its celebrated cast". The play received a nomination for the Tony Award for Best Revival of a Play. Cera and Tyree Henry were also nominated for their performances.

In September 2018 a third show of his, The Waverly Gallery, starring Elaine May, Lucas Hedges, Joan Allen, David Cromer, and Michael Cera, was revived at the John Golden Theatre. Greg Evans of Deadline Hollywood praised the production but highlighted May saying, "this production will be remembered for the stunning Elaine May. She’s so good here that there are moments you’ll swear she isn’t acting. Did she really forget that line? It feels a privilege to watch this legend transform Lonergan’s meditation on dignity, regret and ungraspable memory into something indelible and lasting." The production received a nomination for the Tony Award for Best Revival of a Play. May won the Tony Award for Best Actress in a Play.

During the early 2020s, Lonergan took small supporting roles in projects such as Noah Baumbach's absurdist comedy-drama White Noise (2022) and the Netflix thriller miniseries Ripley (2024). In 2024, Lonergan's play Hold On to Me Darling was revived off-Broadway starring Adam Driver at the Lucille Lortel Theatre. In 2026 it was announced Lonergan's return to film directing with Tomorrow Is a Drag starring Adam Driver, Aubrey Plaza, Vanessa Kirby, and Matthew Broderick.

== Reception ==
Justin Chang of Variety noted that Lonergan is "always a superb director of actresses," particularly in Manchester by the Sea where the director "gives the women in his ensemble their due."

== Personal life ==
Lonergan and actress J. Smith-Cameron are married. They have a daughter, Nellie.

In January 2020, Lonergan was appointed Visiting Fellow and Artist in Residence at Kellogg College of the University of Oxford. Lonergan's stepfather was Freudian psychoanalyst Michael S. Porder.

== Credits ==
=== Film ===
Year	Title	Director	Writer	Actor	Notes	Ref.
1999	Analyze This	No	Yes	No		
2000	You Can Count on Me	Yes	Yes	Yes	Ron	
2000	The Adventures of Rocky and Bullwinkle	No	Yes	No		
2002	Gangs of New York	No	Yes	No		
2004	Marie and Bruce	No	No	Yes	Herb	
2011	Margaret	Yes	Yes	Yes	Karl	
2016	Manchester by the Sea	Yes	Yes	Yes	Manchester Pedestrian	
2022	White Noise	No	No	Yes	Dr. Hookstraten	
TBA	Tomorrow is a Drag	Yes	Yes	No		

=== Television ===
Year	Title	Director	Writer	Actor	Notes	Ref.
1994	Doug	No	Yes	No	2 episodes	
2017	Howards End	No	Yes	No	Miniseries; 4 episodes	
2024	Ripley	No	No	Yes	Herbert Greenleaf; 4 episodes	

=== Theater ===
Year	Title	Notes
1982	The Rennings Children	One-act
1993	Betrayed by Everyone	One-act; would become This is Our Youth
1996	This Is Our Youth	Broadway revival in 2014
2000	The Waverly Gallery	Broadway revival in 2018
2001	Lobby Hero	Broadway revival in 2018
2004	True to You	One-act premiered at TriBeCa Theater Festival
2009	The Starry Messenger	
2012	Medieval Play	
2016	Hold On to Me Darling	Off-Broadway revival in 2024
