= Oliver Cooper =

American actor (born 1989/90)

- Born: 1989 or 1990 (age 36–37); Sylvania Township, Ohio, U.S.
- Occupation: Actor
- Years active: 2009–present

Oliver Cooper (born 1989 or 1990) is an American actor and filmmaker. He made his film debut as Costa in the found footage teen comedy film Project X (2012), which earned him two MTV Movie & TV Award nominations.

Following his breakout role in Project X, Cooper starred in the film Burying the Ex (2014) and had a main role as Wheeler on the Amazon Prime Video television series Red Oaks (2014–2017), as well as a recurring role as Levon on season 7 of the Showtime series Californication (2014). He had supporting roles in the films The Hangover Part III (2013), Runner Runner (2013), and Office Christmas Party (2016).

In the late 2010s and 2020s, Cooper had a main role as Todd Krizelman on the National Geographic docudrama miniseries Valley of the Boom (2019) and starred in the films The Ultimate Playlist of Noise (2021) and Stealing Pulp Fiction (2024). He portrayed Joe Trippi in the political drama film The Front Runner (2018).

Cooper has frequently worked with childhood friend and director Joe Burke on projects, including the films Four Dogs (2013) and Burt (2025), both of which Cooper wrote, produced, and starred in.

== Early life ==
Cooper was born in Sylvania Township, Ohio, where he attended Sylvania Northview High School. He grew up with his parents, Wendy and Mike, and two older siblings, a brother (Jason) and a sister (Nikki). At age 17, Cooper performed stand up comedy in Toledo, Ohio. After high school, he attended Arizona State University for one year. He then dropped out of college to pursue his acting career in Los Angeles. Cooper is Jewish.

== Career ==
At the age of 20, Cooper was offered one of the lead roles in the film Project X. He, Thomas Mann and Jonathan Daniel Brown were three unknown actors when cast in the film. However, Mann had a role in the indie film It's Kind of a Funny Story. Cooper got the audition because of his friend, Shaun Weiss. In addition, for his role in Project X, he was nominated for two MTV awards.

In 2013, he appeared in the film Runner, Runner.

In 2019 he appeared in the second season of the Netflix series Mindhunter as serial killer David Berkowitz.

== Filmography ==
=== Film ===
| Year | Title | Role | Notes |
|---|---|---|---|
| 2011 | Rick White | Rick | Short |
| 2012 | Marriage Drama with Virginia Madsen | Dusty/Steve | Short |
| 2012 | Project X | Costa (Oliver) | |
| 2013 | The Hangover Part III | Pharmacy Assistant | |
| 2013 | Four Dogs | Oliver | Also writer and producer |
| 2013 | Runner Runner | Andrew Cronin | |
| 2014 | Burying the Ex | Travis | |
| 2015 | Mojave | Nick | |
| 2015 | Cindy's New Boyfriend | Spencer | Short |
| 2016 | Office Christmas Party | Drew | |
| 2017 | The Pretender | Gary | Short |
| 2018 | Another Cancer Movie | Phil | Short |
| 2018 | The Front Runner | Joe Trippi | |
| 2020 | The Swing of Things | Ira | |
| 2020 | Jazzberry | Crowe | Short |
| 2020 | Desert Quarantine | Jacob | Short |
| 2020 | Echo Boomers | Stewart | |
| 2021 | The Ultimate Playlist of Noise | Dennis | |
| 2021 | Take Me to Tarzana | Charles | |
| 2021 | Ghostbusters: Afterlife | Security Guard | Scenes cut |
| 2021 | The Cleaner | Busboy | |
| 2021 | Beyond Paranormal | Chaz Gold | |
| 2023 | R | David Winkler | |
| 2023 | As We Know It | Bruce | |
| 2023 | Baby Blue | Mo | |
| 2023 | Clawfoot | Samuel | |
| 2023 | Helen's Dead | Garret | |
| 2024 | I Love You Forever | Harrison | |
| 2024 | Sleuthhound Screwball | Matthew | |
| 2024 | Stealing Pulp Fiction | Dusty | |
| 2025 | Burt | Sammy | Also writer and producer |
| 2025 | The Lemurian Candidate | Stan | |
| 2026 | Soulm8te | Ultima Robotix technician | |

=== Television ===
| Year | Title | Role | Notes |
|---|---|---|---|
| 2009 | iCarly | Kato | Episode: "iDate a Bad Boy" |
| 2014–2017 | Red Oaks | Wheeler | Main role |
| 2014 | Californication | Levon | Recurring role (season 7) |
| 2016 | MacGyver | Ralph | Episode: "Awl" |
| 2017–2022 | The Goldbergs | Other Adam | 3 episodes |
| 2017 | White Famous | TMZ Guy | Episode: "Scandal" |
| 2019 | Valley of the Boom | Todd Krizelman | Main role |
| 2019 | Mindhunter | David “Son of Sam” Berkowitz | Episode: "Episode 2" |
| 2020 | Better Things | Curly | Episode: "She's Fifty" |

=== Web series ===
| Year | Series | Role | Notes |
|---|---|---|---|
| 2017 | Good Game | Steamin' Semen | 4 episodes |
| 2019 | The Coop | Blake | 15 episodes; interactive |

== Awards and nominations ==
| Year | Title | Work | Result |
| 2012 | MTV Movie Award for Best Comedic Performance | Project X | Nominated |
| 2012 | MTV Movie Award for Best Villain | Project X | Nominated |
