= Dan Bakkedahl =

American actor and comedian

- Bakkedahl at TIFF 2026
- Born: November 18, 1969 (age 56)
- Education: Florida State University
- Occupations: Actor, comedian
- Years active: 2002–present
- Spouse: Irene Bakkedahl (m. 2003)
- Children: 2

Dan Bakkedahl (born November 18, 1969) is an American actor and improvisational comedian. He is best known for starring as Tim Hughes on the CBS sitcom Life in Pieces, as Congressman Roger Furlong on the HBO series Veep, and as Steve Nugent in the FX comedy series Legit. From 2005 to 2007, he was a correspondent for three seasons on The Daily Show with Jon Stewart. He additionally has recurring roles on the ABC sitcom The Goldbergs, the HBO Max comedy series Made for Love, and the Netflix comedy Space Force.

== Early life and education ==
Bakkedahl grew up in Stuart, Florida. He is a 1988 graduate of Martin County High School. He is of Norwegian descent. Bakkedahl attended St. Cloud State University in Minnesota, before completing his studies in theatre at Florida State University, where he was a member of the Chi Phi fraternity. His brother is Florida State's Attorney Tom Bakkedahl.

== Career ==
After college, Bakkedahl toured for a year with the Repertory Theater of America. After moving to Chicago, he made a name for himself at the Improv Olympic performing in the influential two-man improv show ZUMPF with his teacher Miles Stroth. Dan went on to perform at the Second City mainstage, eventually writing Doors Open on the Right, Second City’s 90th revue. In Chicago, he is often noted for having left the Second City mainstage due to artistic differences.

Bakkedahl continues to perform regularly at comedy venues such as the Upright Citizens Brigade Theatre, Magnet Theater, Second City and Improv Comedy Lab in Los Angeles. He is also a member of the advisory council of the California Shakespeare Theater.

Bakkedahl's first major television work was on Comedy Central's The Daily Show where he served as a correspondent from 2005 to 2007. After leaving The Daily Show in 2007, he has since moved to Los Angeles and went on to have supporting roles in the films such as Observe and Report, The Heat, and This Is 40. He also appeared in the Snake 'N Bacon animated special on Adult Swim, which aired on May 10, 2009. In early 2010, he co-starred in the comedy pilot Our Show on NBC.

From 2010 through 2011, Bakkedahl appeared in a series of commercials for T-Mobile cellular phones, where he plays a human likeness of AT&T's 3G network.

Bakkedahl has made guest appearances on shows such as 30 Rock, Curb Your Enthusiasm, Newsreaders, and The United States of Tara, as well as appearing in recurring roles as "Murray the A/C Repairman" in season three of Community and as Congressman Furlong on Veep. In 2015, he began recurring roles The Goldbergs as science teacher Mr. Woodburn and on The Mindy Project as Dr. Adrian Bergdahl.

Bakkedahl starred alongside Jim Jeffries and DJ Qualls in the FX comedy series Legit, which ran for two seasons on FX and FXX. Aftwards, he next starred as Tim Hughes on the CBS sitcom Life in Pieces, which began airing in 2015 and concluded after four seasons in 2019.

Bakkedahl co-starred in the HBO Max comedy series Made for Love, which premiered on April 1, 2021 but was canceled in 2022 after two seasons.

== Filmography ==
=== Film ===
Year	Film	Role	Notes
2002	One Man's Ceiling	Gas Man	
2005	25 Years of Improv Comedy	Himself	
2007	Crime Fiction	Crazy Caller	
2008	My First Kidnapping	Rick Sleevning	Short
2009	Observe and Report	Mark	
2009	Welcome to Academia	Valentine	
2010	Marriage Drama with Virginia Madsen	Paul	Short
2010	Voula	Delivery Man	Short
2012	This Is 40	Dentist	
2013	The Heat	Agent Garrett Craig	
2013	Four Dogs	Dan	
2014	Chu and Blossom	Principal Cochette	
2014	Not Safe for Work	Random Denning Employee	
2015	Get Hard	Leo	
2015	Hitman: Agent 47	Sanders	
2015	Trumbo	Roy Brewer	
2016	Brave New Jersey	Reverend Ray Rogers	
2016	Another Evil	Joey Lee Dansing	
2016	The Escort	Rick	
2017	Battle of the Sexes	Gamblers Anon Leader	
2017	Killing Hasselhoff	Nick	
2018	Taco Shop	Nate Holmes	
2018	Action Point	Gregory Knoblach	
2019	Corporate Animals	Billy	
2019	The Buddy Games	Shelly	
2019	Sword of Trust	Kingpin	
2019	Married Young	Pharmacist	
2019	Wyrm	Allen	
2021	The Starling	Chuck	
2023	Sick Girl	Fred Pepper	
2023	Not an Artist	Mr. Marion	
2025	Swiped	Ed	
2026	The Stunt Driver	Bill Wilkins	
2026	Attack of the Killer Tomatoes: Organic Intelligence	Wilbur Finletter	

=== Television ===
Year	Film	Role	Notes
2005–2007	The Daily Show with Jon Stewart	Himself; Correspondent	40 episodes
2007	Law & Order	Tony Bicks	Episode: "Remains of the Day"
2007	30 Rock	Angry Father	Episode: "The Fighting Irish"
2007	Flight of the Conchords	Waiter	Episode: "The Actor"
2008	The Return of Jezebel James	Darryl	Episode: "Needles and Schlag"
2009	The Office	Roger Prince Jr.	Episode: "Prince Family Paper"
2009	Dollhouse	General Store Proprietor	Episode: "True Believer"
2009	Snake 'n' Bacon	Homicide Detective	Animation
2010	Mayne Street	Team Owner	Episode: "Brownian Motion and Straight as an Arrow"
2010	How I Met Your Mother	Curtis	Episode: "Natural History"
2010	Our Show	Neal	TV movie
2011	Hot in Cleveland	Jasper	Episode: "LeBron Is Le Gone"
2011	United States of Tara	Mr. Kern	Episode: "Train Wreck and Crackerjack"
2011	Curb Your Enthusiasm	Waiter	Episode: "The Hero"
2011–2012	Community	Murray	Recurring role
2012	The Book Club	The Author	Episode: "Dirty Jobs and Enemies of the State"
2012	The League	OB Doctor	Episode: "Training Camp"
2013	Grimm	Graydon Ostler	Episode: "A Dish Best Served Cold"
2013–2014	Legit	Steve Nugent	Series regular
2013–2015	Newsreaders	Clint Schliff / Vic Traymore	2 episodes
2013–2019	Veep	Congressman Roger Furlong	Recurring role
2014	Californication	Dr. Dan	Episode: "Smile"
2014	Major Crimes	Carl Lembeck	Episode: "Cutting Loose"
2014	Gotham	Davis Lamond / The Balloonman	Episode: "The Balloonman"
2014	Bad Judge	Mr. Lewis	Episode: "Knife to a Gunfight"
2014	Brooklyn Nine-Nine	Lt. Andrew Miller	Episode: "The Mole"
2014–2022	The Goldbergs	Mr. Woodburn	Recurring role
2015	Sin City Saints	Dan	Episode: "Urine God's Hands Now"
2015	Battle Creek	Barclay Spades	Episode: "Gingerbread Man"
2015	The Mindy Project	Dr. Adrian Bergdahl	Recurring role
2015–2019	Life in Pieces	Tim Hughes	Series regular
2016	TripTank	Various voices	2 episodes
2017	Man Seeking Woman	Ruffala	Episode: "Popcorn"
2017	Tarantula	Lucas (voice)	9 episodes
2019–2020	Puppy Dog Pals	Various voices	4 episodes
2020	The Boss Baby: Back in Business	Scary Sweary CEO Baby (voice)	Animation
2020	Space Force	John Blandsmith	Recurring role
2020	Teen Titans Go!	Sheriff (voice)	Episode: "The Night Begins to Shine"
2020	Tales from the Loop	Ed	3 episodes
2021	Impeachment: American Crime Story	Kenneth Starr	6 episodes
2021–2022	Made for Love	Herringbone	Series regular
2022	Bust Down	Horace	Episode: "Bad Hang"
2023	History of the World, Part II	Winston Churchill	Episode: "V"
2023	Party Down	Marty Mittman	Episode: "Sepulveda Basin High School Spring Play Opening Night"
2023	Barry	FBI Agent Curtis	Episode: "you're charming"
2024	Quantum Leap	Milton Wells	Episode: "The Family Treasure"
2024	Dinner with the Parents	Harvey Langer	Main cast
2024	Tulsa King	Wesley Tucker	2 episodes
2024–2025	Solar Opposites	Commander Zarck	5 episodes
2026	Chicago Fire	Uncle Larry	2 episodes
2027	Hidden Heroes: A Descendants Story	Yen Sid	TV Movie

=== Other work ===
Year	Film	Role	Notes
2005	Mortal Kombat: Shaolin Monks	Additional voices (voice: English version)	Video game
