= Twenty Good Years =

- Genre: Sitcom
- Created by: Michael Leeson; Marsh McCall
- Starring: Jeffrey Tambor; John Lithgow; Heather Burns; Jake Sandvig
- Composers: Steve Hampton; John Adair
- Country of origin: United States
- Original language: English
- No. of seasons: 1
- No. of episodes: 13 (9 unaired)

Production
- Camera setup: Multi-camera
- Running time: 30 minutes
- Production companies: Marsh McCall Productions; Werner/Gold/Miller Productions; Warner Bros. Television

Original release
- Network: NBC
- Release: October 11 – November 1, 2006

Twenty Good Years is an American sitcom television series created by Michael Leeson and Marsh McCall, that aired on NBC from October 11, 2006, until November 1, 2006. The series starred Jeffrey Tambor, John Lithgow, Heather Burns and Jake Sandvig.

== Synopsis ==
John Lithgow plays John Mason, a surgeon forced into semi-retirement, while Jeffrey Tambor was Jeffrey Pyne, a judge. The comedy show was about two old friends that appeared to be polar opposites in many situations. One thing they agreed upon, however, is that life is short and both men vowed to live every day like it is their last, since they figured at their age, they only had "twenty good years" to live.

On May 14, 2007, the series was officially canceled by NBC.

== Cast ==
- John Lithgow as John Mason
- Jeffrey Tambor as Jeffrey Pyne
- Heather Burns as Stella Mason
- Jake Sandvig as Hugh Pyne

== Ratings and reception ==
Since the series debut, Twenty Good Years had been plagued by schedule changes before the season began, as well as receiving mixed-to-negative reviews. It had also placed fourth in its Wednesday time period and continued to slip since the first episode. On October 25, 2006, NBC announced that it was replacing the Wednesday night comedy block with specials, pulling Twenty Good Years from the schedule with no plans for a return.

== Episodes ==
No.	Title	Directed by	Written by	Original release date	Prod. code
1	"Pilot"	Terry Hughes	Marsh McCall & Michael J. Leeson	October 11, 2006	1000
Meet John and Jeffrey, two complete opposites who can only agree on one thing – they only have twenty good years left to live. In spite of the differences between the two, they vow to live each day as if it were their last – without looking back and without any regrets.
2	"Big Love"	Terry Hughes	Patricia Breen	October 18, 2006	1002
John and Jeffrey go to a rock music club. To their surprise, the club’s sexy owner (Jane Leeves) flirts with them and invites them to an after-party. John and Jeffrey end up dating her at the same time and she offers a challenge that may be too much for them to handle.
3	"The Elbow Incident"	Terry Hughes	Marsh McCall	October 25, 2006	1001
When Jeffrey hurts his elbow in a basketball game against two younger players he refuses to let John operate because he is afraid of hospitals. This does not sit well with John because he wants a rematch against the younger players.
4	"Jeffrey's Choice"	Terry Hughes	Unknown	November 1, 2006	1003
John does not like it when Jeffrey's ex-girlfriend Gina shows up again. He is afraid it will ruin the plans he has for him and Jeffrey.
5	"Between Brock and a Hard Place"	Terry Hughes	TBD	UNAIRED	1004
When Jeffrey and John's neighbor, Brock Manley, invites them to apply for membership in "The Magellan Adventure Club," an exclusive, all male club, it leads the two friends into an initiation process they didn't bargain for.
6	"They Shoot Turkeys, Don't They?"	Terry Hughes	TBD	UNAIRED	1005
As they prepare for Thanksgiving, Jeffrey struggles to teach Hugh how to make the perfect pie and John makes plans to hunt for his turkey dinner. Meanwhile, John finds out about Stella's relationship with the doctor hired to replace him.
7	"The Bong Show"	Terry Hughes	TBD	UNAIRED	1006
When Jeffrey accidentally buys a bong thinking it is a vase, John sneaks it into the background of a formal photo being taken of Jeffrey to be hung in the courthouse in honour of twenty years of service as a judge.
8	"Foil Me Once"	Terry Hughes	TBD	UNAIRED	1007
9	"Adventure Club"	Terry Hughes	TBD	UNAIRED	1008
10	"The Crying Game"	Terry Hughes	TBD	UNAIRED	1009
When John’s date accuses him of being unemotional, John pretends to cry, however she sees through him. Meanwhile, Jeffrey cooks in a smoky kitchen because his building manager always ignores his pleas to fix the broken vent and a stuck window.
11	"Remember the Alimony"	Terry Hughes	TBD	UNAIRED	1010
When John’s ex-wife, Kate announces that she is engaged, John is ecstatic because he won’t be paying alimony to her anymore. Jeffrey suspects that Kate’s fiancé is gay after admitting that he’s ‘living a lie’.
12	"Come Fly with Me"	Terry Hughes	TBD	UNAIRED	1011
Jeffrey finds the woman that he wants to spend the rest of his life with and, as always, John’s not happy about it. Feeling rejected, John goes to Las Vegas and returns the next day with a new wife, a Korean blackjack dealer.
13	"John's Old Lady"	Terry Hughes	TBD	UNAIRED	1012
Jeffrey notices that John’s constant bickering with their attractive middle-aged next door neighbour is just thinly-veiled flirtation. Meanwhile, a sexy law student flirts with Jeffrey; however they do not have much in common with each other.

== International broadcasts ==
Country	Broadcaster	Timeslot	Notes
Australia	Nine HD		The entire series has been broadcast.
Belgium	VT4	15:40 (UTC+1)	
Brazil	SBT		
Bulgaria	Nova television		
Denmark	6'eren		
Slovenia	Kanal A	Midnight (UTC+1)	The entire series has been broadcast.
New Zealand	TV2		
Finland	MTV3		
Russia	NTV		The entire series has been broadcast.
Macedonia	A2 TV		
Cyprus	Nimonia		
Ukraine	Novyi Kanal		
Norway	TV3		
