= Heather Burns =

American actress

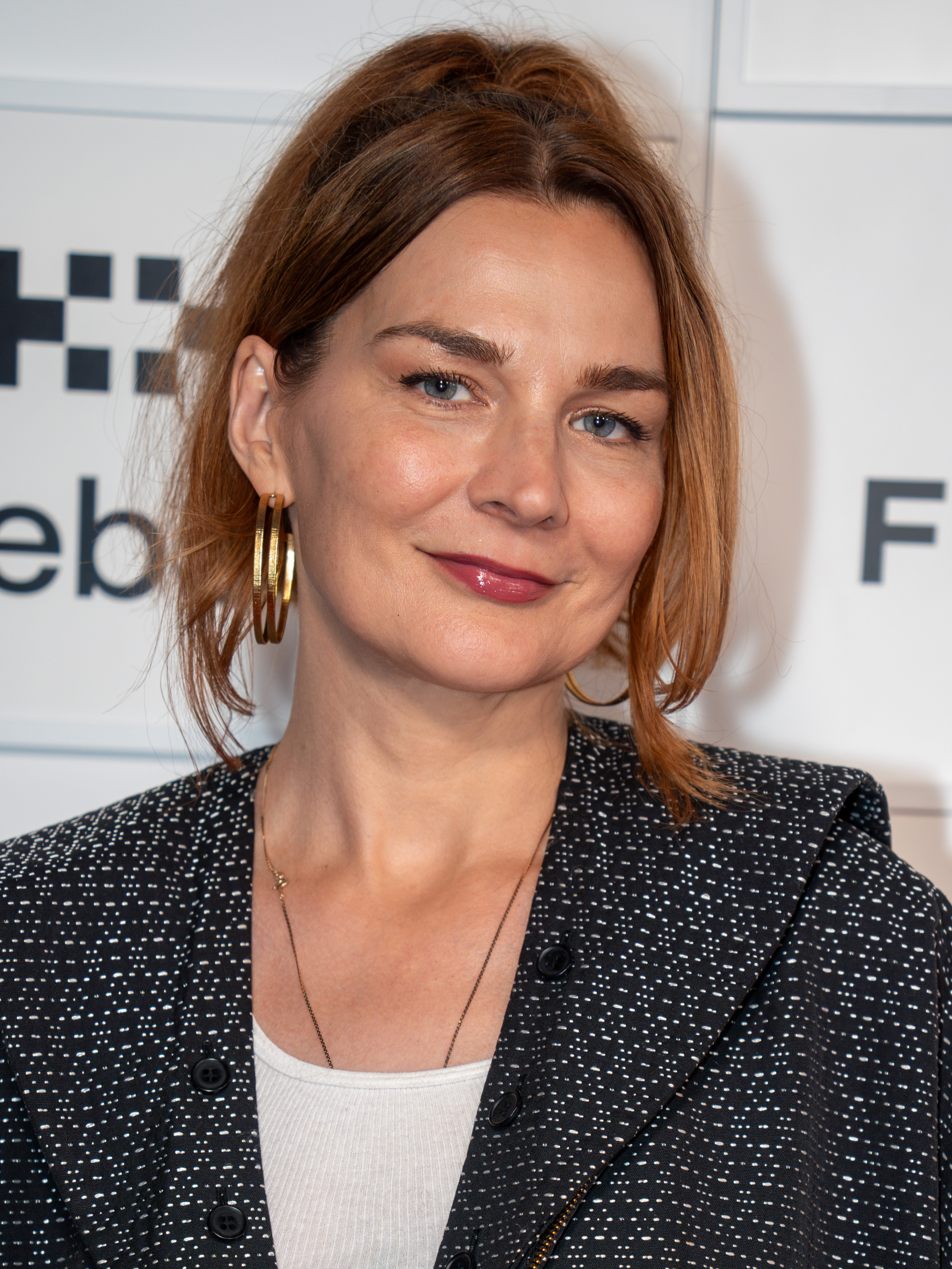
- Burns at the 2025 Tribeca Festival
- Occupations: Film, television actress
- Years active: 1993–present
- Spouse: Ajay Naidu

Heather Burns is an American actress. She is known for playing the best friend role in a string of successful romantic comedies such as You've Got Mail (1998), Miss Congeniality (2000), Two Weeks Notice (2002), and Bewitched (2005).

== Career ==
Burns has appeared in a number of films with Sandra Bullock, including Miss Congeniality (2000), Two Weeks Notice (2002) and Miss Congeniality 2: Armed and Fabulous (2005). She also starred in the film What's Your Number? (2011) and she held a series regular role opposite Zach Galifianakis in the HBO series Bored to Death and played Trish in the Amazon webseries Sneaky Pete (2017).

In 2020, she appeared as a guest star in the Netflix series The Politician, for which she received praise for her performance. In 2024 she acted in the off Broadway revival of the Kenneth Lonergan play Hold On to Me Darling opposite Adam Driver. Christopher Barnard of Vogue praised her performance describing her as having "sharklike cunning and steadiness".

== Personal life ==
Burns is married to actor Ajay Naidu.

== Filmography ==
=== Film ===
| Year | Title | Role | Notes |
|---|---|---|---|
| 1998 | You've Got Mail | Christina Plutzker | |
| 2000 | You Are Here* | Lydia | |
| 2000 | Miss Congeniality | Cheryl Frasier, Miss Rhode Island | |
| 2002 | Two Weeks Notice | Meryl Brooks | |
| 2003 | Kill the Poor | Scarlet | |
| 2005 | Perception | Ramona | |
| 2005 | Miss Congeniality 2: Armed and Fabulous | Cheryl Frasier, Miss United States | |
| 2005 | Bewitched | Nina | |
| 2005 | Brooklyn Lobster | Kerry Miller | |
| 2006 | The Groomsmen | Jules | |
| 2007 | Watching the Detectives | Denise | |
| 2008 | Choke | Internet Date / Gwen | |
| 2009 | Breaking Upwards | Hannah | |
| 2010 | Ashes | Jasmine | |
| 2010 | Weakness | Julia | |
| 2011 | Valley of the Sun | Betsy | |
| 2011 | What's Your Number? | Eileen | |
| 2012 | The Fitzgerald Family Christmas | Erin | |
| 2016 | Manchester by the Sea | Jill | |
| 2016 | Brave New Jersey | Lorraine Davison | |
| 2025 | The Best You Can | Rosemary | |

=== Television ===
| Year | Title | Role | Notes |
|---|---|---|---|
| 1996–1997 | One Life to Live | Herrick #1 | TV series |
| 1998 | Law & Order | Lana Madison | Episode: "Carrier" |
| 1999 | Chicks | Darcy | TV film |
| 1999 | Nearly Yours | Olivia Hammersmith | TV series |
| 2000 | The Beat | Beatrice Felsen | Episodes: "The Beat Goes On", "They Say It's Your Birthday" |
| 2000 | The $treet | Joanne Sacker | Episode: "Rebound" |
| 2001 | The $treet | Joanne Sacker | Episodes: "Turf Wars", "Past Performance", "Junk Bonds", "Framed" |
| 2003 | With You in Spirit | Emily Burke | TV film |
| 2006 | Law & Order: Criminal Intent | Claire Quinn | Episode: "Dollhouse" |
| 2006–2007 | Twenty Good Years | Stella | Main role |
| 2008 | Puppy Love | Ricki | TV series |
| 2009 | The Unusuals | Bridget Demopolis | Episodes: "Crime Slut", "42", "The Circle Line" |
| 2009–2011 | Bored to Death | Leah | Main role |
| 2013 | Save Me | Jenna Derring | TV series |
| 2013 | Elementary | Chloe Butler | Episode: "Internal Audit" |
| 2014 | Blue Bloods | Sister Mary | Episode: "Burning Bridges" |
| 2017 | Friends from College | Anka Wexler | Episode: "Second Wedding" |
| 2017, 2019, 2020 | Blindspot | Kathy Gustafson aka Electra | 4 episodes |
| 2018 | Sneaky Pete | Trish | Episodes: "Maggie", "Buffalo Soldiers" |
| 2020 | The Politician | Mary Moskowitz McCutcheon | Episode: "Hail Mary" |
| 2021 | The Good Fight | Toni Hedger | Episode: "Once There Was A Court" |
| 2022 | Julia | Claire Foster | Episode: "Crepes Suzette" |

=== Theater ===
| Year | Title | Role | Playwright | Venue | Ref. |
|---|---|---|---|---|---|
| 2001 | Lobby Hero | Dawn | Kenneth Lonergan | Playwrights Horizons, John Houseman Theater | |
| 2003 | This Is Our Youth | Jessica Goldman | Kenneth Lonergan | Garrick Theatre, West End | |
| 2003 | Writer's Block | Jenny | Woody Allen | Atlantic Theater Company | |
| 2005 | Fran's Bed | Vicky | James Lapine | Playwrights Horizons | |
| 2008 | The Marriage of Bette and Boo | Emily | Christopher Durang | Roundabout Theater Company | |
| 2010 | Middletown | Mary Swanson | Will Eno | Vineyard Theatre | |
| 2012 | Medieval Play | Catherine of Sienna | Kenneth Lonergan | Signature Theatre Company | |
| 2014 | Dinner with Friends | Beth | Donald Margulies | Roundabout Theater Company | |
| 2017 | The Kid Stays in the Picture | Young Robert Evans, Mia Farrow, Ali MacGraw, Ensemble | Simon McBurney | Royal Court | |
| 2018 | Peace for Mary Frances | Helen | Lily Thorne | The New Group | |
| 2022 | Epiphany | Kelly | Brian Watkins | Lincoln Center Theater | |
| 2024 | Hold On to Me Darling | Nancy | Kenneth Lonergan | Lucille Lortel Theater, Off-broadway | |
