= Catlin Adams =

American actress and film director

- Born: Nira Barab; October 11, 1950 (age 75); Los Angeles, California, U.S.
- Occupations: Acting coach; director; actress; writer; producer
- Years active: 1968–present

Catlin Adams (born October 11, 1950) is an American actress, acting coach and film director. As an actress, she appeared in films including The Jerk and The Jazz Singer.

== Early life ==
Catlin Adams was born as Nira Barab on October 11, 1950, in Los Angeles, California. At 14, Adams became the youngest actress to join the Actors Studio. There, she studied with her teacher and mentor, Lee Strasberg, until his death. She was also mentored by Stella Adler, Harold Clurman, Lee Grant, Gary Austin and Ellen Burstyn.

== Career ==
Adams is a graduate of the American Film Institute. She made a TV film, "Wanted: A Perfect Guy", starring young Ben Affleck. This TV film won two Emmys and a Directors Guild Award. Four years later, Adams directed the feature film Sticky Fingers, which she co-wrote and co-produced with Melanie Mayron.

One of Adams' first acting roles came in the 1968 TV series The Rat Patrol. She is a founding member of the improv comedy group, The Groundlings.

== Filmography ==
=== As an actress ===
Year	Title	Role	Notes
1968	The Rat Patrol	Girl	1 episode
1968–1970	Adam-12	Karen/M'Liss	2 episodes
1970	Up in the Cellar	Tracey Chamber	
1971	Nichols	Mabel Zimmerman	1 episode
1973	The Fuzz Brothers	Trina	
1974	McMillan & Wife	Ruth Habbib	1 episode
1975	The Fortune	Girl Lover	
1975	Katherine	Jessica	
1976	The Streets of San Francisco	Cathy Dineen	1 episode
1977	Panic in Echo Park	Cynthia	
1975–1977	Kojak	Sheila/Adelle/Theresa Ryan	4 episodes
1979	The Jerk	Patty Bernstein	
1980	The Jazz Singer	Rivka Rabinovitch	
1982–1983	Square Pegs	Ms. Loomis	5 episodes
1990	thirtysomething	Pippa Fallow	1 episode
1995	Freaky Friday	Dana 'Dinky' Barb	
1997	Toothless	Carrie's Mum	
1998	New York Undercover	Judge Carol Underwood	1 episode
2000	Providence	Rebecca Rosen	1 episode
2012	Underworld: Awakening	Olivia	
2025	Burt	Sylvia	

=== As a director ===
Year	Title	Notes
1986	ABC Afterschool Specials	Episode: "Wanted: The Perfect Guy"
1988	Sticky Fingers	
1990	Stolen: One Husband	
1990	Beverly Hills, 90210	Episode: "Every Dream Has Its Price (Tag)"
