= This Is Our Youth =

Play by Kenneth Lonergan, first version staged in 1993

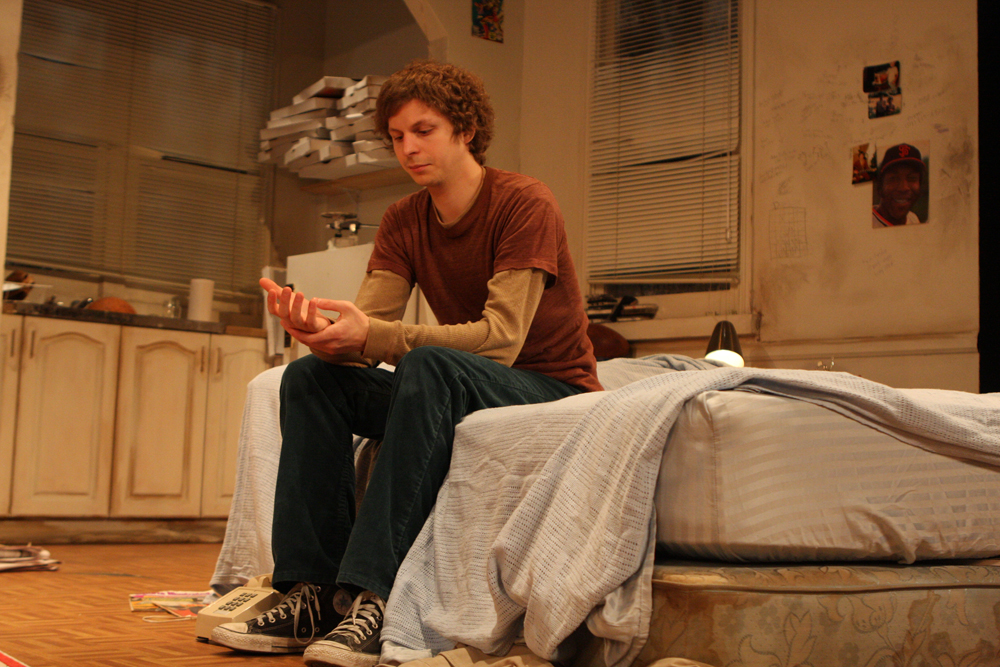
- Michael Cera, playing Warren Straub, in a March 2012 production staged at the Sydney Opera House
- Written by: Kenneth Lonergan
- Characters: Dennis, Warren, Jessica

Premiere
- Date: October 26, 1996
- Place: Intar Theatre, New York City

This Is Our Youth is a play by American dramatist and screenwriter Kenneth Lonergan. It premiered Off-Broadway in 1996 and since been produced all over the world, including the West End, Broadway, Sydney, and Toronto.

== Plot ==
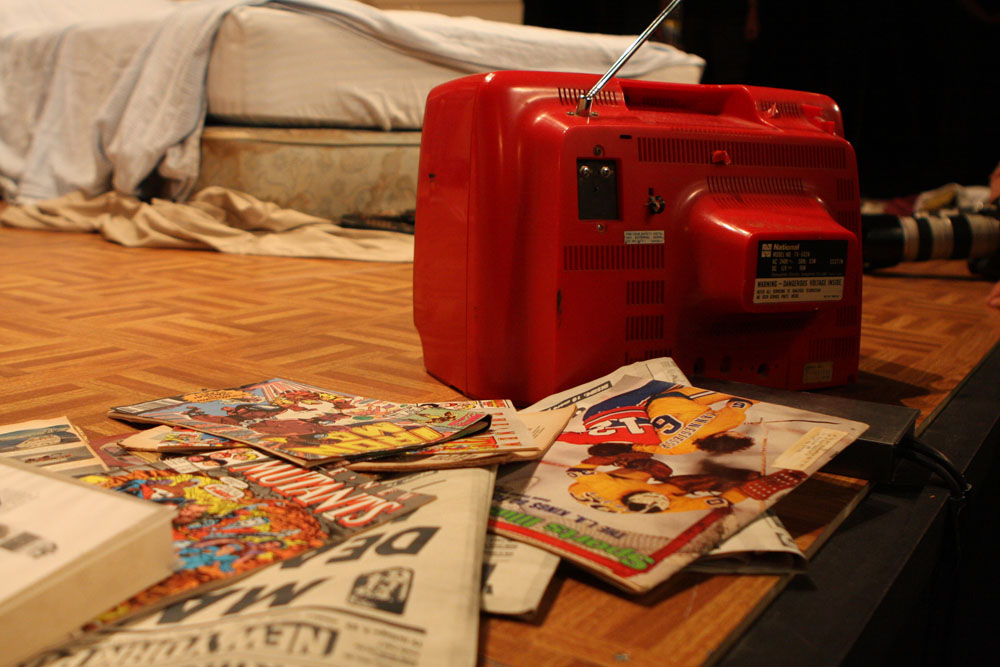
A portable television and comic books are props on the floor of a set from This Is Our Youth at Sydney Opera House

The play takes place in Dennis Ziegler's family's apartment on the Upper West Side of Manhattan in March 1982.

Dennis's friend Warren Straub, a dejected 19-year-old, has just been kicked out of his house and stolen $15,000 from his abusive lingerie tycoon father. Dennis, the more wily and domineering of the two, spends some of the money on cocaine, hoping to sell it to a friend for much more. Jessica Goldman, an "anxiously insightful" fashion student, arrives, and Warren hopes that he can use the money to entice her into bed.

The play explores timeless issues of adolescence and maturity, as well as the Reagan Era in which it is set: the characters feel adrift in 1980s-style materialism.

== Production history ==
This Is Our Youth premiered as a one-act titled Betrayal by Everyone in 1993 at the Met in a festival of short plays.

Originally produced by The New Group, the play opened Off-Broadway at the Intar Theatre on October 26, 1996 and closed on November 24, 1996 after 22 performances. Directed by Mark Brokaw and using light designs by Mark McCullough, the cast featured Josh Hamilton as Dennis, Mark Ruffalo as Warren, and Missy Yager as Jessica. It again played Off-Broadway in a Second Stage revival at the McGinn/Cazale Theatre, from November 3, 1998 to May 2, 1999, with the original cast, except for Mark Rosenthal as Dennis. It transferred to the since-demolished Douglas Fairbanks Theatre.

The US West Coast premiere took place in October 2000 at the B Street Theater in Sacramento, California, produced by co-founding brothers Buck and Timothy Busfield. The play starred Peter Humer, Andrew Benator and Jessica Goldman and was directed by Amy Resnick.

In the West End, it played at the Garrick Theatre from 2 March 2002 to 15 March 2003. The opening cast was Jake Gyllenhaal, Hayden Christensen, and Anna Paquin. Notable replacements included Matt Damon, Colin Hanks, Chris Klein, Freddie Prinze Jr., Alison Lohman, Heather Burns, Casey Affleck and Kieran Culkin. The production was produced by Phil Cameron for Background, Clare Lawrence and Anna Waterhouse for Out of the Blue (for and on behalf of Back to Blue Limited).

A non-equity production directed by Serge Seiden was presented by Studio Theatre 2ndStage in Washington, DC from May 16 to June 30, 2002. The cast included Karl Miller, Jon Bernthal, and Amy Montminy.

The Australian premiere was produced by Black Swan Theatre Company and Echelon Productions at The Store Room, Melbourne in 2002. It starred Ditch Davey, Tim Wright and Amanda Levy.

In 2003, Woody Harrelson directed a production of This Is Our Youth for the Berkeley Street Theatre in Toronto, Ontario, Canada, with Fabrizio Filippo, Marya Delver and Marcello Cabezas in the cast.

Michael Cera and Kieran Culkin, who co-starred in 2010's Scott Pilgrim vs. the World, had been in talks to stage a revival in New York during 2010; they later headlined a run at the Sydney Opera House in March 2012 helmed by original director Brokaw, with Cera playing Warren, Culkin playing Dennis, and Australian actress Emily Barclay in the role of Jessica Goldman. A production ran at the Steppenwolf Theatre Company in Chicago, featuring Cera, Culkin, and Tavi Gevinson and directed by Anna D. Shapiro, from June 10 to July 27, 2014. The production premiered on Broadway at the Cort Theatre with the same cast and director, in previews beginning August 18, 2014 and opening September 11, 2014 for a 20-week run (through January 4, 2015).

== Casts ==
Note: Below are the principal casts of major productions.

| Role | Off-Broadway (1996) | West End (2002) | Sydney (2012) | Broadway (2014) |
|---|---|---|---|---|
| Warren Straub | Mark Ruffalo | Jake Gyllenhaal | Michael Cera | Michael Cera |
| Dennis Ziegler | Josh Hamilton | Hayden Christensen | Kieran Culkin | Kieran Culkin |
| Jessica Goldman | Missy Yager | Anna Paquin | Emily Barclay | Tavi Gevinson |

=== Notable replacements ===
==== West End (2002–03) ====
- Warren Straub: Casey Affleck, Kieran Culkin, Freddie Prinze Jr.
- Dennis Ziegler: Matt Damon, Colin Hanks, Chris Klein
- Jessica Goldman: Summer Phoenix, Alison Lohman, Heather Burns

== Reception ==
Writing in The New York Times in 1996, critic Peter Marks called the play "a revealing and offbeat dissection of its world," adding, "It is not easy to find love and humor in the middle of nowhere. But with the skill of a first-rate creative team, even nowhere can be someplace special." Reviewing the 1998 production two years later, Marks wrote, "'This Is Our Youth' is back, and not a moment too soon. In a season in which some of the wise men of the theater have been trying to force-feed insipid fare like Stupid Kids and Footloose to young audiences, it's sheer relief to celebrate the return of a rambunctious and witty play about wayward teen-agers and post-adolescents that doesn't turn youthful travails into plastic rap." Marks cited the play's "indelible impression," the playwright's "unfailing antennae," writing, "This Is Our Youth-- by turns caustic, cruel and compassionate -- is the real real world." This Is Our Youth ranked 21st in Andy Propst's list of the greatest plays ever written and 12th in the 2018 New York Times critics' list of the best American plays of the past 25 years.

== Awards and nominations ==
=== 1996 Off-Broadway premiere ===
| Year | Award | Category | Work | Result | Ref. |
|---|---|---|---|---|---|
| 1997 | Lucille Lortel Award | Outstanding Director | Mark Brokaw | Won | |
| 1997 | Drama Desk Award | Outstanding Play | | Nominated | |

=== 1998 Off-Broadway revival ===
| Year | Award | Category | Work | Result | Ref. |
|---|---|---|---|---|---|
| 1999 | Lucille Lortel Award | Outstanding Lead Actor in a Play | Mark Ruffalo | Won | |

=== 2014 Broadway revival ===
| Year | Award | Category | Work | Result | Ref. |
|---|---|---|---|---|---|
| 2015 | Tony Award | Best Revival of a Play | | Nominated | |
| 2015 | Drama League Award | Distinguished Revival of a Play | | Nominated | |
