= Four Dogs =

2013 American film

- Digital release poster
- Directed by: Joe Burke
- Written by: Joe Burke; Oliver Cooper
- Produced by: Joe Burke; Oliver Cooper
- Starring: Oliver Cooper; Dan Bakkedahl; Kathleen McNearney; ReBecca Goldstein
- Cinematography: Todd Banhazl
- Edited by: William Adashek
- Music by: Michael Saig
- Production company: Floating Rock Pictures
- Distributed by: Vimeo on Demand
- Release date: June 16, 2013 (LFF)
- Running time: 80 minutes
- Country: United States
- Language: English
- Budget: $25,000

Four Dogs is a 2013 American comedy-drama film directed by Joe Burke and starring Oliver Cooper, Dan Bakkedahl, Kathleen McNearney, and ReBecca Goldstein. Written and produced by Burke and Cooper, the film follows two amateur actors, Oliver and Dan (Cooper and Bakkedahl), whose daily routines are shaken up when a friend of Oliver's aunt comes to town for a few days. The film is based on Cooper's real-life relationship with his aunt, played by Goldstein.

Four Dogs premiered at the Los Angeles Film Festival on June 16, 2013, where it was nominated for the Best Narrative Feature award. The film received positive reviews from critics.

== Premise ==
The film follows two amateur actors, Oliver and Dan (Cooper and Bakkedahl), whose daily routines are shaken up when a friend of Oliver's aunt comes to town for a few days.

== Cast ==
- Oliver Cooper as Oliver
- Dan Bakkedahl as Dan
- ReBecca Goldstein as Becca
- Kathleen McNearney as Diane
- Shaun Weiss as Shaun

== Production ==
Four Dogs was produced on a budget of $25,000. In an interview with The Wrap, Cooper spoke about the film's production, stating, "When I moved out to L.A., I lived with my aunt, so the movie is really about me living with her and taking care of her dogs. She actually plays herself in the movie. It was small, but we didn’t have anyone else telling us what to do." The film is based on Cooper's real-life relationship with his aunt.

== Release ==
Four Dogs premiered at the Los Angeles Film Festival on June 16, 2013. The film was released digitally on Vimeo on Demand on June 10, 2014. On July 17, 2019, the film was made available for purchase on Amazon Prime Video.

== Reception ==
Justin Lowe of The Hollywood Reporter gave the film a positive review, calling it an "amiable shaggy-mutt story," and that it represented a "promising calling card" for Burke and Cooper. He also praised Cooper's performance. Ryan Lattanzio of IndieWire also gave the film a positive review, calling it an "easy, breezy comedy."

== Accolades ==
| Year | Award | Category | Nominated work | Result |
|---|---|---|---|---|
| 2013 | Los Angeles Film Festival | Best Narrative Feature | Joe Burke | Nominated |
