= Hold On to Me Darling =

Play

Hold on to Me Darling
- 2024 Off-Broadway revival poster
- Original language: English
- Written by: Kenneth Lonergan
- Subject: Existentialism, grief, family, midlife crisis, fame
- Setting: Tennessee

Premiere
- Date: February 24, 2016
- Place: Linda Gross Theater

Hold on to Me Darling is a play by Kenneth Lonergan. The show, first produced Off-Broadway in 2016, follows fictional country music icon, Strings McCrane, who finds himself in an existential tailspin on learning of his mother's death.

The play had its world premiere off-Broadway starring Timothy Olyphant and was produced by the Atlantic Theater Company. It received a nomination for the Outer Critics Circle Award for Outstanding New Off-Broadway Play.

In 2024, the play was revived at the Lucille Lortel Theatre with Adam Driver starring as McCrane.

== Summary ==
The story revolves around a country music icon named Strings McCrane, who finds himself in an existential tailspin on learning of his mother's death. Determined to abandon his celebrity and career, he moves back to his hometown in Tennessee.

== Cast ==
Role	Atlantic Theater Off-Broadway (2016)	Lucille Lortel Theatre Off-Broadway (2024)
Strings McCrane	Timothy Olyphant	Adam Driver
Essie	Adelaide Clemens	Adelaide Clemens
Nancy	Jenn Lyon	Heather Burns
Jimmy	Keith Nobbs	Keith Nobbs
Mitch	Jonathan Hogan	Frank Wood
Duke	C.J. Wilson	C.J. Wilson

== Productions ==
The play had its world premiere in 2016, opening on March 14 at Atlantic Theater Company’s Linda Gross Theater starring Timothy Olyphant and directed by Neil Pepe. The play had an off-Broadway revival at the Lucille Lortel Theatre starring Adam Driver and ran from September 24, 2024 to December 22.

== Critical reception ==
The 2016 production received mixed reviews with Frank Rizzo of Variety praising its lead star Olyphant but writing that while "The play is entertaining and engaging, performed by a top-rate ensemble...its long reach for political and social resonance is a stretch, with Strings and those around him equating or manipulating his celebrity life and personal angst to a larger moral drift of the country." David Rooney of The Hollywood Reporter wrote, "There’s a much better play nestling in the almost three hours of Hold On to Me Darling, but Lonergan seems unwilling to find it, leaving most of the poignancy buried between his disjointed scenes en route to a conclusion of unearned emotion.". Alexis Soloski of The Guardian described the play as being "amusing but uneven", adding that it was a "A changeable blend of farce, comedy and drama".

The 2024 production received critical acclaim, particularly for Driver's performance. Robert Hoffer for The Wrap considered McCrane to be the "best role" of Driver's career. Jesse Hassenger for The Guardian wrote that Driver as McCrane has "the magnetism to draw all eyes in his direction whenever he’s on stage." For Vogue, Christopher Barnard commented that throughout the play's nearly 3-hour runtime "Driver does not hit a false note, a feat considering the aw-shucks, cowboy clichés lurking in the lines for less capable actors."

== Accolades ==
=== 2016 Original Production ===
Year	Award	Category	Nominated work	Result	Ref.
2016	Outer Critics Circle Award	Outstanding New Off-Broadway Play	Kenneth Lonergan	Nominated	

=== 2024 Off-Broadway revival ===
Year	Award	Category	Nominated work	Result	Ref.
2025	Drama League Award	Distinguished Performance	Adam Driver	Nominated	
2025	Lucille Lortel Awards	Outstanding Revival	Kenneth Lonergan	Nominated	
2025	Lucille Lortel Awards	Outstanding Lead Performer in a Play	Adam Driver	Nominated	
2025	Lucille Lortel Awards	Outstanding Featured Performer in a Play	Frank Wood	Nominated	
2025	Outer Critics Circle Award	Outstanding Lead Performer in an Off-Broadway Play	Adam Driver	Won	
2025	Outer Critics Circle Award	Outstanding Featured Performer in an Off-Broadway Play	Frank Wood	Nominated	
