= Mark Brokaw =

American theatre director (1958–2025)

- Born: Robert Mark Brokaw; September 13, 1958; Aledo, Illinois, U.S.
- Died: June 29, 2025 (aged 66); New York City, New York, U.S.
- Education: University of Illinois, Urbana-Champaign (BA); Yale University (MFA)
- Occupations: Theatre director, film director
- Spouse: Andrew Farber (m. 2019)

Robert Mark Brokaw (September 13, 1958 – June 29, 2025) was an American theatre director who won the Drama Desk Award, Obie Award, and Lucille Lortel Award as Outstanding Director of a Play for How I Learned to Drive.

== Background ==
Robert Mark Brokaw was born on September 13, 1958, in Aledo, Illinois. He graduated from the University of Illinois at Urbana–Champaign, where he studied rhetoric, and the Yale School of Drama. He received a Drama League fellowship and was initially given directing work through Carole Rothman and Robyn Goodman, artistic heads of the Second Stage Theatre.

== Career ==
Brokaw directed many off-Broadway productions, and his New York work included premieres by Lynda Barry (The Good Times Are Killing Me), Douglas Carter Beane (As Bees in Honey Drown), Neal Bell, Eric Bogosian, Keith Bunin, Charles Busch, Kevin Elyot, Lisa Kron (2.5 Minute Ride), Lisa Loomer, Kenneth Lonergan (This Is Our Youth, Lobby Hero), Craig Lucas (Dying Gaul), Eduardo Machado, Patrick Marber (After Miss Julie), Robert Schenkkan, Nicky Silver, Paula Vogel (How I Learned to Drive, Long X-Mas Ride Home), and Wendy Wasserstein. He directed in New York at Playwrights Horizons, Vineyard Theatre, The New Group, Second Stage Theatre, Lincoln Center, New York Shakespeare Festival/The Public Theater, Manhattan Theatre Club, Signature Theatre, and the Roundabout Theatre. He spent five seasons with the Young Playwright's Festival (1989–1995). Brokaw was also a member of the Drama Dept. theatre company.

In regional theatre, he directed at the Guthrie (Racing Demon in 1997-98; A Month in the Country in 1998-99), Seattle Repertory Theatre (The Lisbon Traviata, 1991; The Good Times Are Killing Me, 1992), Long Wharf, Yale Rep, Hartford Stage, South Coast Repertory, Huntington, Actors Theatre of Louisville, and the O'Neill Conference, Sundance Theatre Lab, Berkeley Rep, Center Theatre Group, La Jolla Playhouse, and New York Stage and Film. He directed A Little Night Music for the Kennedy Center Sondheim Celebration in 2002.

On Broadway, he directed Reckless (2004), The Constant Wife (2005), the musical Cry-Baby (2007), After Miss Julie (2009), The Lyons (2012), the musical Cinderella (2013), and Heisenberg (2016).

His work was also seen at London's Donmar Warehouse and the Menier Chocolate Factory, Dublin's Gate Theatre, and the Sydney Opera House.

He directed the film Spinning into Butter starring Sarah Jessica Parker, Beau Bridges, and Miranda Richardson in 2006.

Brokaw's final Broadway production was in 2022, when he directed a revival of How I Learned to Drive.

Brokaw was a past vice president and member of the executive board of the Stage Directors and Choreographers Society, and President of the Stage Directors and Choreographers Foundation. He was the Artistic Director of the Yale Institute for Music Theatre 2009-17 and was an associate artist of the Roundabout Theatre.

== Personal life and death ==
In 2019, Brokaw married his longtime partner, Andrew Farber; they lived in Manhattan. He died at home from prostate cancer on June 29, 2025, at the age of 66.

== Selected works ==
- The Rimers of Eldritch (Second Stage Theatre, 1988)
- The Good Times Are Killing Me (Second Stage, 1991)
- As Bees in Honey Drown (Drama Department, 1997)
- How I Learned to Drive (Vineyard Theatre, 1997)
- Racing Demon (Guthrie Theatre, 1997)
- The Dying Gaul (Vineyard Theatre, 1998)
- The Glass Menagerie (Steppenwolf Theatre Company, 1998)
- 2.5 Minute Ride (Public Theatre, 1999)
- This is Our Youth (New Group and Second Stage Theatre, 1999)
- Lobby Hero (Donmar Warehouse, 2002)
- The Long Christmas Ride Home (Vineyard Theatre, 2003)
- Reckless (Manhattan Theatre Club, 2004)
- Constant Wife (Roundabout, 2006)
- POP! (Yale Rep, 2009)
- The Lyons (Off-Broadway, 2011; Broadway, 2012)
- Cinderella (Broadway Theatre, 2013)
- Heisenberg (New York City Center, 2015; Samuel J. Friedman Theatre, 2016)
