= Farrelly brothers =

Sibling filmmakers

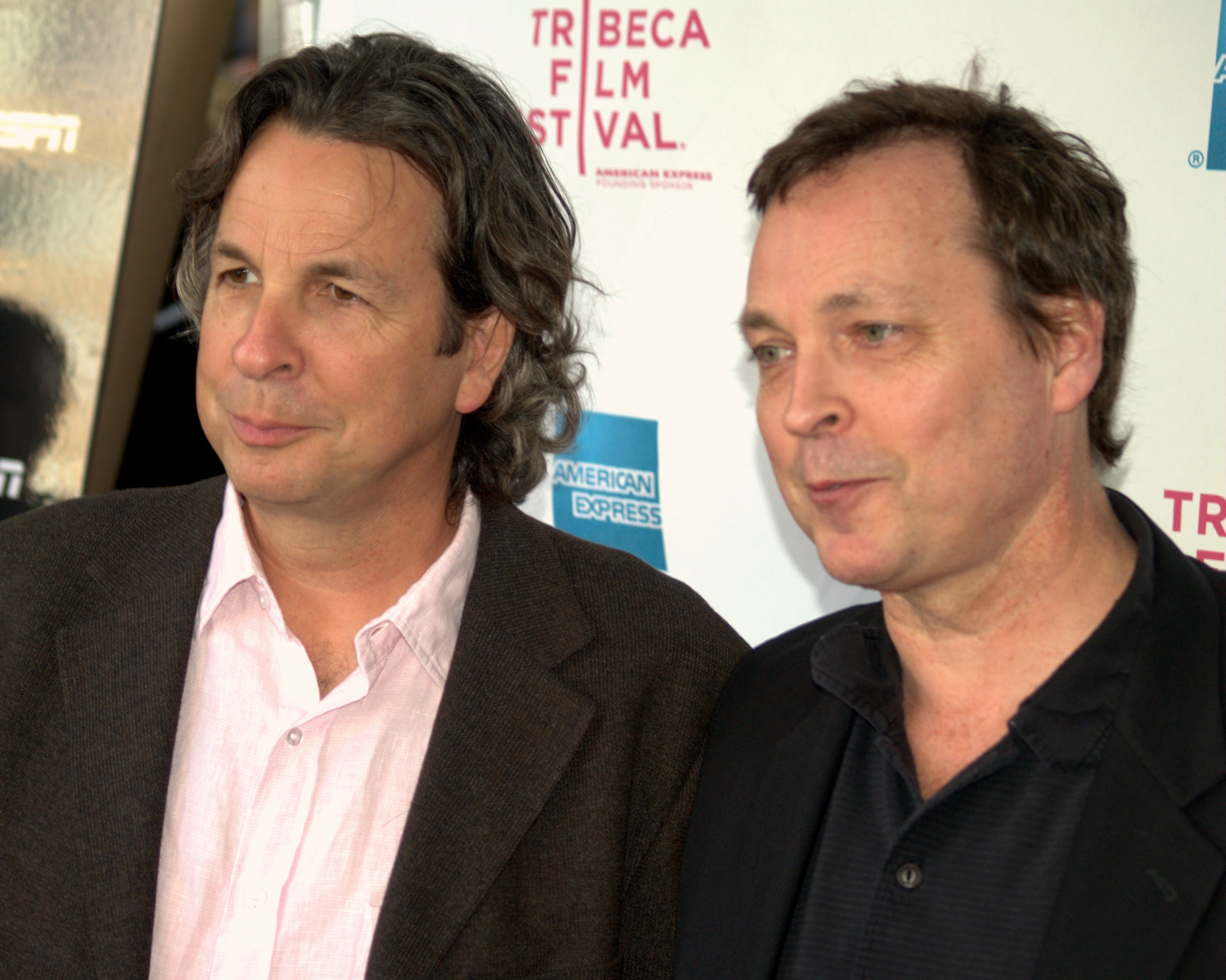
- The filmmaking duo—Peter Farrelly (left) and Bobby Farrelly (right)—at the 2009 Tribeca Film Festival
- Born: Peter John Farrelly; December 17, 1956 (age 69); Phoenixville, Pennsylvania, U.S; Robert Leo Farrelly Jr.; June 17, 1958 (age 68); Cumberland, Rhode Island, U.S
- Occupations: Screenwriters; directors
- Style: Teen; science fiction; action; comedy; drama; fantasy

Peter Farrelly and Bobby Farrelly, collectively referred to as the Farrelly brothers, are American screenwriters and directors. They have made eleven films together, largely comedies, including Dumb and Dumber, Shallow Hal and There's Something About Mary.

Peter Farrelly directed the 2018 film Green Book which won the Academy Award for Best Picture at the 91st Academy Awards, held in 2019.

== Early life ==
The brothers were raised in Cumberland, Rhode Island, and are of Irish descent. Following college, they pursued careers as television writers, notably for Seinfeld.

== Themes ==
Each of the brothers' first four films (Dumb and Dumber, Kingpin, There's Something About Mary, and Me, Myself & Irene) has a plot centering on a road trip. These trips all originate in Rhode Island, except for Kingpin, which begins in Pennsylvania. Their films make frequent use of slapstick and toilet humor and are often populated with blunt, profane working-class characters in small roles. Many of their films contain flashback scenes that show how a character was affected by a traumatic event. The brothers are also noted for their soundtracks, which typically feature distinctive selections of classic and contemporary power pop and folk rock songs.

Sports are a common feature of their films, and they have often cast sports stars (particularly from New England teams) for bit parts and cameo appearances, including Cam Neely, Johnny Damon, Roger Clemens, Brett Favre, Anna Kournikova, and Tom Brady.

The brothers have been praised and critiqued for the way they use the subject of disability in their films. Peter Farrelly has commented:

"The problem is not that we look down on these people, but rather that we look up at them and feel that they are better than us... we revere them."

— Peter Farrelly

Peter Farrelly has published books, including Outside Providence and The Comedy Writer.

== Filmography ==
=== Film ===
Film work by the Farrelly brothers
| Year | Title | Directors | Writers | Producers | Note(s) |
|---|---|---|---|---|---|
| 1994 | Dumb and Dumber | Yes | Yes | No | Bobby Farrelly uncredited as director |
| 1996 | Kingpin | Yes | No | No | |
| 1998 | There's Something About Mary | Yes | Yes | No | |
| 1999 | Outside Providence | No | Yes | Yes | Based on Peter Farrelly's 1988 novel of the same name. |
| 2000 | Me, Myself & Irene | Yes | Yes | Yes | |
| 2001 | Say It Isn't So | No | No | Yes | |
| 2001 | Osmosis Jones | Yes | No | Yes | Directors of live-action sequences only |
| 2001 | Shallow Hal | Yes | Yes | Yes | |
| 2003 | Stuck on You | Yes | Yes | Yes | |
| 2005 | Fever Pitch | Yes | No | No | |
| 2005 | The Ringer | No | No | Yes | |
| 2007 | The Heartbreak Kid | Yes | Yes | No | |
| 2011 | Hall Pass | Yes | Yes | Yes | |
| 2012 | The Three Stooges | Yes | Yes | Yes | |
| 2013 | Movie 43 | Peter Farrelly | No | Peter Farrelly | Winner of the Razzie Award for Worst Picture; Segments "The Pitch," "The Catch," and "Truth or Dare" director. |
| 2014 | Dumb and Dumber To | Yes | Yes | Yes | |
| 2018 | Green Book | Peter Farrelly | Peter Farrelly | Peter Farrelly | Winner of the Academy Award for Best Picture. |
| 2022 | The Greatest Beer Run Ever | Peter Farrelly | Peter Farrelly | No | |
| 2023 | Champions | Bobby Farrelly | No | No | |
| 2024 | Ricky Stanicky | Peter Farrelly | Peter Farrelly | No | |
| 2024 | Dear Santa | Bobby Farrelly | Peter Farrelly | Yes | |
| 2025 | Driver's Ed | Bobby Farrelly | No | No | |
| 2026 | Balls Up | Peter Farrelly | No | No | |
| 2026 | I Play Rocky | Peter Farrelly | No | Peter Farrelly | |

=== Television ===
Television work by the Farrelly brothers
| Year | Title | Note(s) |
|---|---|---|
| 1992 | Seinfeld | 1 episode: "The Virgin," Co-writers |
| 2002 | Ozzy & Drix | Executive Producers, animated series |
| 2008 | Unhitched | 1 episode: "Pilot," Director, producers |
| 2016 | Trailer Park Boys | 6 episodes, Director |
| 2017 | Loudermilk | 3 Seasons, Creator, directors, producers |
| 2021 | The Now | |
