= The Ringer (2005 film) =

American sports comedy film

- Promotional poster
- Directed by: Barry W. Blaustein
- Written by: Ricky Blitt
- Produced by: Peter Farrelly; Bradley Thomas; Bobby Farrelly; John Jacobs
- Starring: Johnny Knoxville; Brian Cox; Katherine Heigl
- Cinematography: Mark Irwin
- Edited by: George Folsey Jr.
- Music by: Mark Mothersbaugh
- Production company: Conundrum Entertainment
- Distributed by: Fox Searchlight Pictures
- Release date: December 23, 2005
- Running time: 94 minutes
- Country: United States
- Language: English
- Budget: $20 million
- Box office: $40.4 million

The Ringer is a 2005 American slapstick sports comedy film starring Johnny Knoxville, Katherine Heigl, and Brian Cox with cameos by Terry Funk and Jesse Ventura. Directed by Barry W. Blaustein, it was produced by the Farrelly brothers. The film was released on December 23, 2005, by Fox Searchlight Pictures.

The plot centers around a young man (Knoxville) who, as part of a scheme to pay off his debts, poses as being developmentally disabled to compete in the Special Olympics.

The film received mixed reviews, but its positive depiction of people with disabilities was received approvingly by multiple commentators. The film was also endorsed by the real-life Special Olympics.

== Plot ==
Steve Barker receives a promotion at work and is forced to fire his friend Stavi, a hard-working immigrant janitor. He reluctantly does but hires Stavi to work around his apartment. While working, Stavi loses three fingers in a lawnmower accident and reveals that he does not have health insurance. Steve decides to raise $28,000 within two weeks to pay for the surgery to reattach Stavi's fingers.

His uncle Gary owes $40,000 in gambling debts and suggests that they fix the Special Olympics in San Marcos, Texas, to solve their financial problems. Steve enters the Special Olympics under the guise of being a high-functioning young man named "Jeffy Dahmor" with a developmental disability. Assuming that Steve will easily defeat the legitimate contenders, Gary bets $100,000 that reigning champion Jimmy Washington won't win the gold medal. Despite initial disgust at pretending to be intellectually disabled, Steve goes along.

During the competition, he falls in love with Lynn, a Special Olympics volunteer. During this time, 6 other contestants see through Steve's act, so he tells them the truth about Stavi. As Steve decides to leave after exposure, they ask him to stay, resolving to help him save Stavi's fingers primarily because they're fed up with Jimmy winning all the time.

Steve encourages Thomas to talk to a girl he likes, who is currently seeing Jimmy, and takes the group to see a showing of Dirty Dancing. Steve gets to know Lynn more but is dismayed to learn that she is engaged to David and during a double date, he discovers David to be a pathological liar when talking to a waitress; after Steve discovers that David is cheating on Lynn with that waitress, Lynn ends things with him. Steve feels remorse for taking part in the Special Olympics and tells a priest in a confession booth, only for the priest to punch him in the face and kick him out of the church, and later bet on him to win. During the formal dance, Steve and Lynn grow close, but Steve almost kisses her during a dance and Lynn hastily retreats.

Steve secures a spot in the final event and discovers Jimmy to be an exceptional opponent. At the final competition, Jimmy sprains his knee during the race, and Steve, rather than win the event, goes back to assist him. Upon finishing, Steve's friend Glen comes in 1st, with Steve in 3rd behind Jimmy. During the medal ceremony, Steve comes clean that he is not developmentally disabled, reveals his actual name, and gives his medal to Thomas, who had finished 4th. Lynn, upset at Steve, slaps him when he attempts to apologize to her. Uncle Gary still wins his bet, as his condition was that Jimmy would lose.

Six months later, Steve quits his job and starts working in theater, producing a play with the friends he made during the Special Olympics and Stavi, who got his fingers reattached. Glen and the others trick Lynn into coming to the theater, and Steve starts to apologize. Lynn forgives him because Stavi told her why Steve pretended to be developmentally disabled, and they kiss.

In a mid-credits scene, as the Special Olympics athletes are performing their version of Romeo and Juliet, Steve and his friends begin dancing onstage with the Kids of Widney High as they perform the song "Respect".

== Cast ==
- Johnny Knoxville as Steve Barker, an office worker posing as a mentally disabled athlete in order to raise money for a friends surgery
- Brian Cox as Gary Barker, Steve's scheming uncle with a gambling problem
- Katherine Heigl as Lynn Sheridan, a Special Olympics volunteer whom Steve's fallen for
- Jed Rees as Glen Chervin, a top ranking Special Olympics athlete and Steve's friend
- Bill Chott as Thomas Wetzig, a Special Olympics athlete with low self esteem and Steve's friend
- Edward Barbanell as Billy B'Devore, a Special Olympics athlete with down syndrome and Steve's roommate
- Leonard Earl Howze as Mark, a Special Olympics athlete with a hulking attitude and Steve's friend
- Geoffrey Arend as Winston Kelso Smith, a Special Olympics athlete known for taping videos and Steve's friend
- John Taylor as Rudy, a Special Olympics athlete with a snarky attitude and Steve's friend
- Luis Ávalos as Stavi, an immigrant janitor who later became a landscaper and was injured in the process
- Leonard Flowers as Jimmy Washington, the arrogant 6x Special Special Olympics champion
- Zen Gesner as David Patrick, Lynn's cheating fiancée
- Al Dias as Michael, a bar owner and gambling bookie who Gary owes money to
- Brad Leland as Mr. Henderson, Steve's boss at the office

Professional wrestlers Terry Funk and Jesse Ventura's cameo appearances came about due to their friendship with director Barry Blaustein, who met the pair whilst filming the wrestling documentary Beyond the Mat in the late 1990s. Funk portrayed one of the debt collectors, while Ventura lent his voice as a motivational speaker on tape. ESPN sportscaster Steve Levy also appears in the movie as himself.

== Production ==
The film took seven years to get made due to its controversial subject. The Special Olympics committee eventually agreed to endorse the film, the filmmakers having given them final say on the script.

Producer Farrelly is himself a longtime volunteer with Best Buddies, a group that provides mentoring programs for people with intellectual disabilities, and has prominently featured characters with disabilities in his previous films such as Warren, the brother of Mary in There's Something About Mary, and Rocket in Stuck on You.

During the end credits, scenes from Shakespeare's Romeo and Juliet are shown being performed, ending with the Kids of Widney High performing Aretha Franklin's "Respect."

== Reception ==
The film review aggregator Rotten Tomatoes lists 40% positive reviews based on 89 critics, with an average rating of 5.00/10. The site's consensus states: "Despite a few laughs and good intentions, The Ringer is too predictable to really score the points it aims for." On Metacritic, the film has a weighted average score of 46 out of 100, based on 29 critics, indicating "mixed or average reviews".

Roger Ebert gave the film three out of four stars, stating: "The movie surprised me. It treats its disabled characters with affection and respect... and it's actually kind of sweet."

Spinal Cord Injury Zone stated: "Instead of tugging at the heartstrings, The Ringer uses the typical outrageous Farrelly Brothers humor (There's Something About Mary, Stuck on You, Shallow Hal) to promote the message that just like everyone else, individuals with intellectual disabilities are people first, each with their own interests, talents, abilities and personalities. The movie also features more than 150 people with intellectual disabilities in small parts and supporting roles."

== Soundtrack ==
1. "Ton of Shame" – written by Randy Weeks, performed by Randy Weeks
2. "Mr. Sandman" – written by Pat Ballard
3. "Sweet Ride" – written by Gustaf Norén and Björn Dixgård, performed by Mando Diao
4. "Wink and a Nod" – written by Tom Wolfe, performed by The Funny Bones
5. "Merlot" – written by Tom Wolfe, performed by The Tasters
6. "Real Thing" – written by Tom Wolfe, performed by The Shakers
7. "Main Title – written by Elmer Bernstein, performed by Elmer Bernstein
8. "Calvera" – written by Elmer Bernstein, performed by Elmer Bernstein
9. "Hot Sugar" – written by Sammy James Jr. and Graham Tyler, performed by The Mooney Suzuki
10. "Girls Gone Wild" – written by Karlyton Clanton, Rochad Holiday and Chris Reese, performed by Dirty Rat
11. "We Got to Get You a Woman" – written by Todd Rundgren, performed by Todd Rundgren
12. "If She Wants Me" – written by Sarah Martin, Stuart Murdoch, Richard Colburn, Mick Cooke (as Michael Cooke), Christopher Geddes, Stevie Jackson (as Stephen Jackson) and Bob Kildea, performed by Belle & Sebastian
13. "Piano Man" – written by Billy Joel
14. "My Cherie Amour" – written by Stevie Wonder, Sylvia Moy and Henry Cosby
15. "Kellerman's Anthem" – written by Michael Goldman
16. "Fox Sports Network College Basketball Theme 2001" – written by Christopher Brady
17. "September" – written by Allee Willis, Al McKay and Maurice White, performed by Earth Wind & Fire
18. "Pretty Girls" – written by Carl Brown, Shelly Goodhope, Tanesa Tavin, Daniel Brattain, Veronica Mendez, Darrell Mitchell, Albert Cota, Chantel Roquemore and Michael Monagan, performed by The Kids of Widney High
19. "Respect" – written by Otis Redding, performed by The Kids of Widney High
20. "You Are Everything" – written by Linda Creed and Thom Bell (as Thomas Bell), performed by The Stylistics

== See also ==
- List of films about the sport of athletics
- Spain at the 2000 Summer Paralympics
- Special Olympics
