= Bradley Thomas (producer) =

American film and television producer

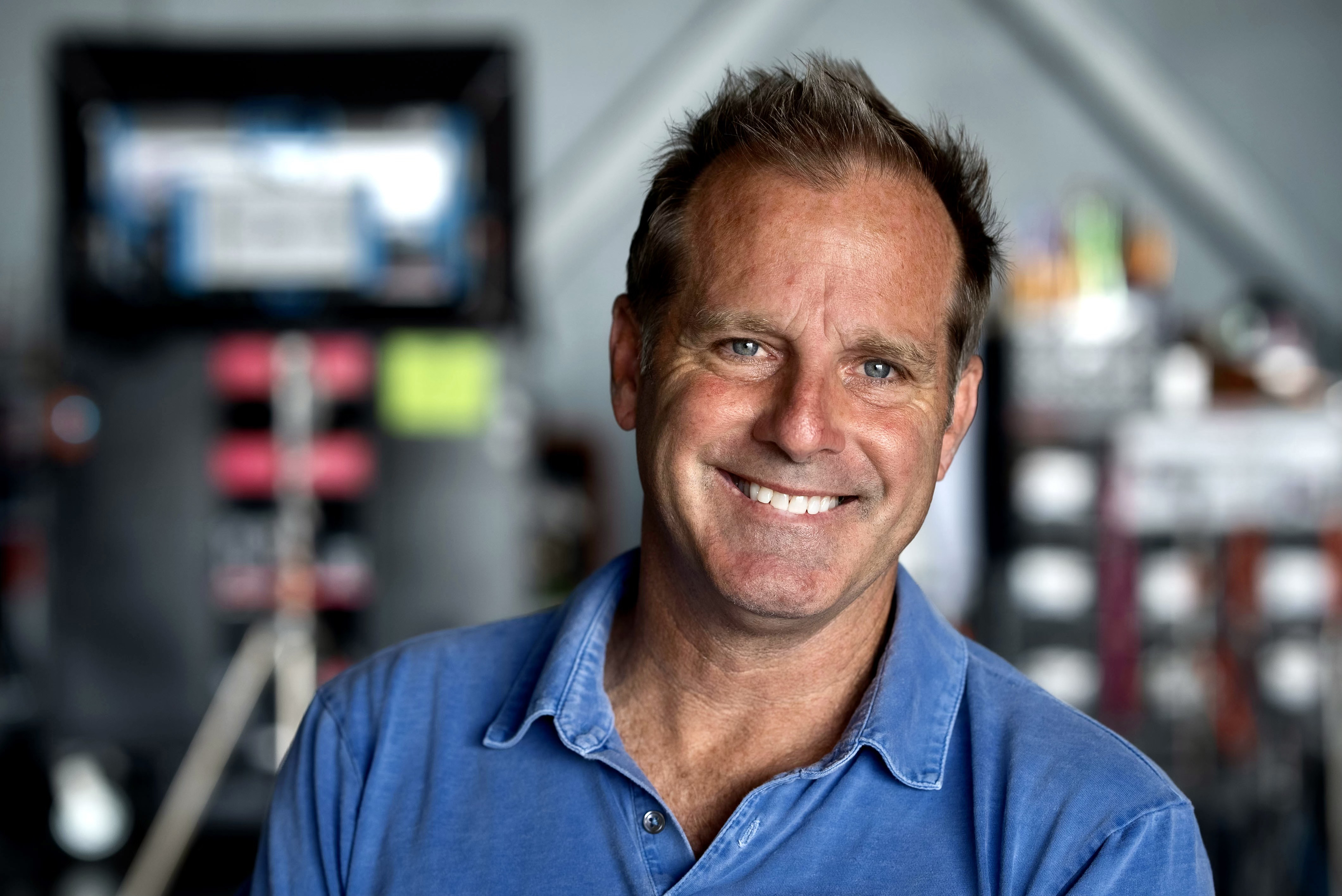
- Thomas in 2021
- Born: November 30, 1965 (age 60)
- Occupation: Producer
- Spouse(s): Hillary Matthews (m. 1997; div. 2015) Isabelle Thomas (m. 2018; died 2024)

Bradley Thomas (born November 30, 1965) is an American film and television producer.

== Career ==
Thomas is the co-founder of Imperative Entertainment, a studio specializing in the development, production, and financing of original and branded entertainment across all platforms focusing on film, television, and documentaries. Imperative Entertainment films include The Square (Palme d'Or at the 2017 Festival de Cannes), All the Money in the World, and The Mule. Imperative Entertainment also produced the 2023 Academy Award nominated film Killers of the Flower Moon which stars Leonardo DiCaprio.

Thomas has produced films with Peter and Bobby Farrelly such as Dumb and Dumber, There’s Something About Mary, Me Myself and Irene, Shallow Hal, Hall Pass, and also co-produced Triangle of Sadness. and Black Bird for Apple TV.

In the early 2010s, Thomas collaborated with comedy legend Larry David to produce “Clear History” for HBO.

== Personal life ==
In 2018, Thomas married to Isabelle, daughter of physicist Sir Henry Lawrence, 7th Baronet. The couple had two children. On January 29, 2024, Isabelle died by suicide at the age of 39 after jumping off a hotel balcony. He was also previously married to actress Hillary Matthews.

== Filmography ==
Films	Credits	Year
Killers of the Flower Moon	Producer	2023
Black Bird	Executive Producer	2022
Triangle of Sadness	Executive Producer	2022
Treadstone	Executive Producer	2019
The Last Vermeer	Producer	2019
The Mule	Producer	2018
The Square	Executive Producer	2017
All the Money in the World	Producer	2017
Clear History	Executive Producer	2013
The Three Stooges	Producer	2012
Hall Pass	Producer	2011
The Heartbreak Kid	Producer	2007
The Perfect Catch	Producer	2005
Stuck On You	Producer	2003
Ozzy & Drix	Producer	2002
Shallow Hal	Producer	2001
Me Myself & Irene	Producer	2000
There’s Something About Mary	Producer	1998
Dumb and Dumber	Co-Producer	1994
