= Bobby Farrelly =

American filmmaker (born 1958)

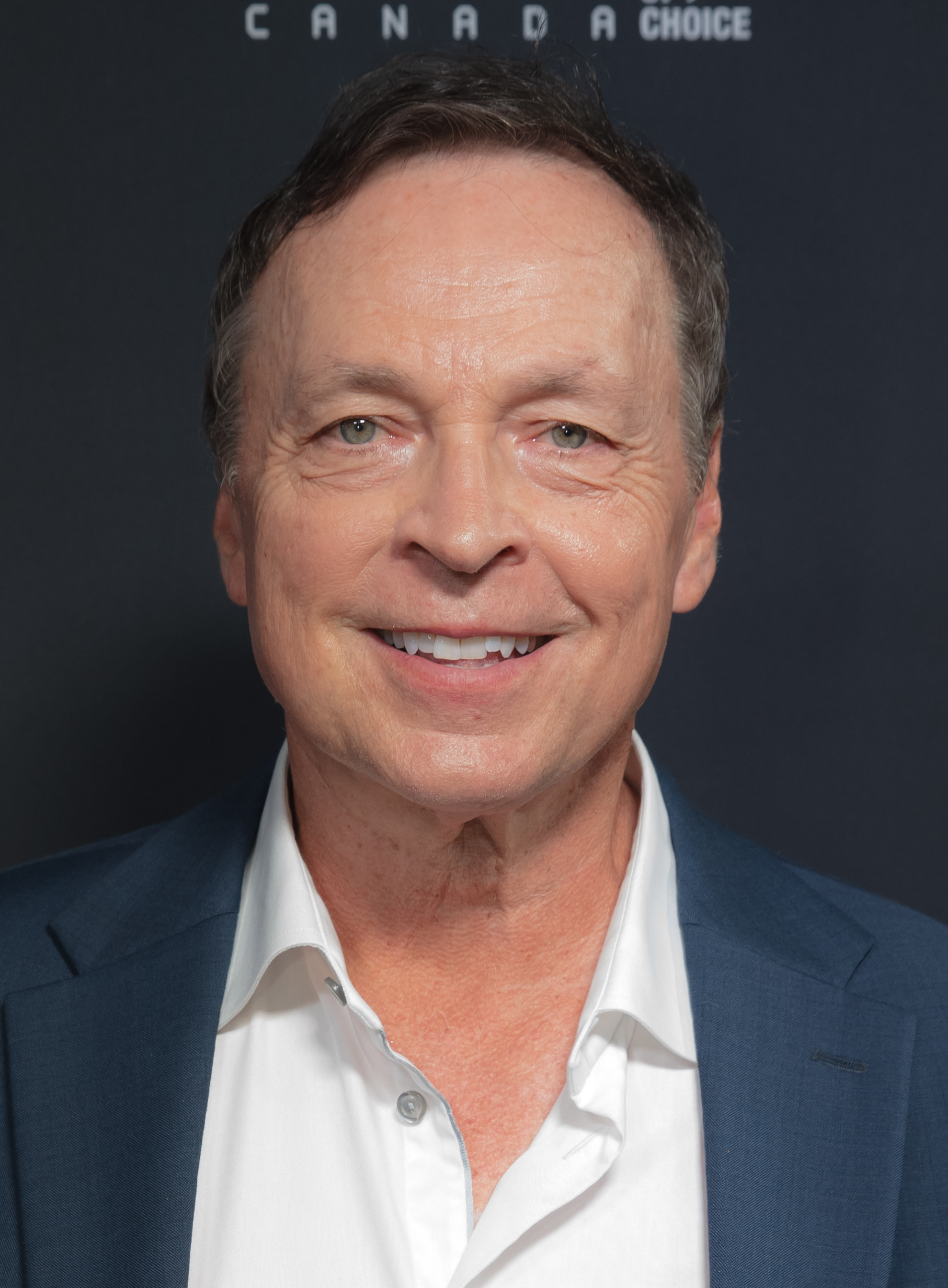
- Farrelly in 2025
- Born: Robert Thomas Farrelly; June 17, 1958 (age 68); Cumberland, Rhode Island, U.S.
- Education: Rensselaer Polytechnic Institute
- Occupations: Film director, producer
- Years active: 1994–present
- Known for: There's Something About Mary, Dumb and Dumber
- Spouses: Nancy Farrelly (m. 1990; div. 2022) Lana Cheng Farrelly (m. 2025)
- Relatives: Peter Farrelly (brother); Abe Farrelly (son)

Robert Thomas Farrelly (born June 17, 1958) is an American film director, screenwriter and producer. He is one of the Farrelly brothers, alongside his brother Peter, who together are known for directing and producing successful box-office comedy films, including Dumb and Dumber (1994), There's Something About Mary (1998), Me, Myself and Irene (2000), Shallow Hal (2001), and the 2007 remake of The Heartbreak Kid. He made his solo directorial debut in 2023 with Champions.

== Early life ==
Farrelly was born in Cumberland, Rhode Island, to Mariann, a nurse practitioner, and Dr. Robert Leo Farrelly. His grandparents were Irish immigrants, and he also has Polish ancestry. Farrelly is a graduate of Rensselaer Polytechnic Institute, where he entered the school on a hockey scholarship.

== Career ==
=== Film ===
Farrelly co-wrote the comedy film Dumb and Dumber (1994), which was directed by his brother Peter. In the film, two dimwitted friends, played by Jim Carrey and Jeff Daniels, embark on a road trip to return a lost briefcase full of cash to a business woman, played by Lauren Holly. The film was a large success at the box office. Farrelly's co-directorial debut was Kingpin (1996), starring Woody Harrelson, Randy Quaid and Bill Murray. A sports comedy, the film chronicles competitors in the world of professional bowlers as they compete in a high-stakes tournament. He then co-directed There's Something About Mary (1998), which became the fourth highest-grossing film of 1998, as well as the highest-grossing film of his career. The film stars Ben Stiller and Cameron Diaz.

Farrelly co-produced and co-wrote Outside Providence (1999), which was an adaptation of Peter Farrelly's 1988 novel of the same name. Farrelly next co-directed Me, Myself & Irene (2000), a slapstick dark comedy about a state trooper in Rhode Island, played by Jim Carrey, whose years of suppressed rage results in a psychotic break and split personality. The film also stars Renée Zellweger and Chris Cooper. In 2001, Farrelly co-directed Osmosis Jones, a blend of live-action and animation, starring Bill Murray and Chris Rock. The Farrelly brothers wrote, directed and produced the romantic comedy Shallow Hal (2001), starring Jack Black and Gwyneth Paltrow. The film is about a superficial man who falls in love with a 300-pound woman after being hypnotized into only seeing a person's inner beauty. Their next project was Stuck on You (2003), a comedy film starring Matt Damon, Greg Kinnear, Eva Mendes and Meryl Streep about conjoined twins who move to Hollywood so one can pursue a career as an actor.

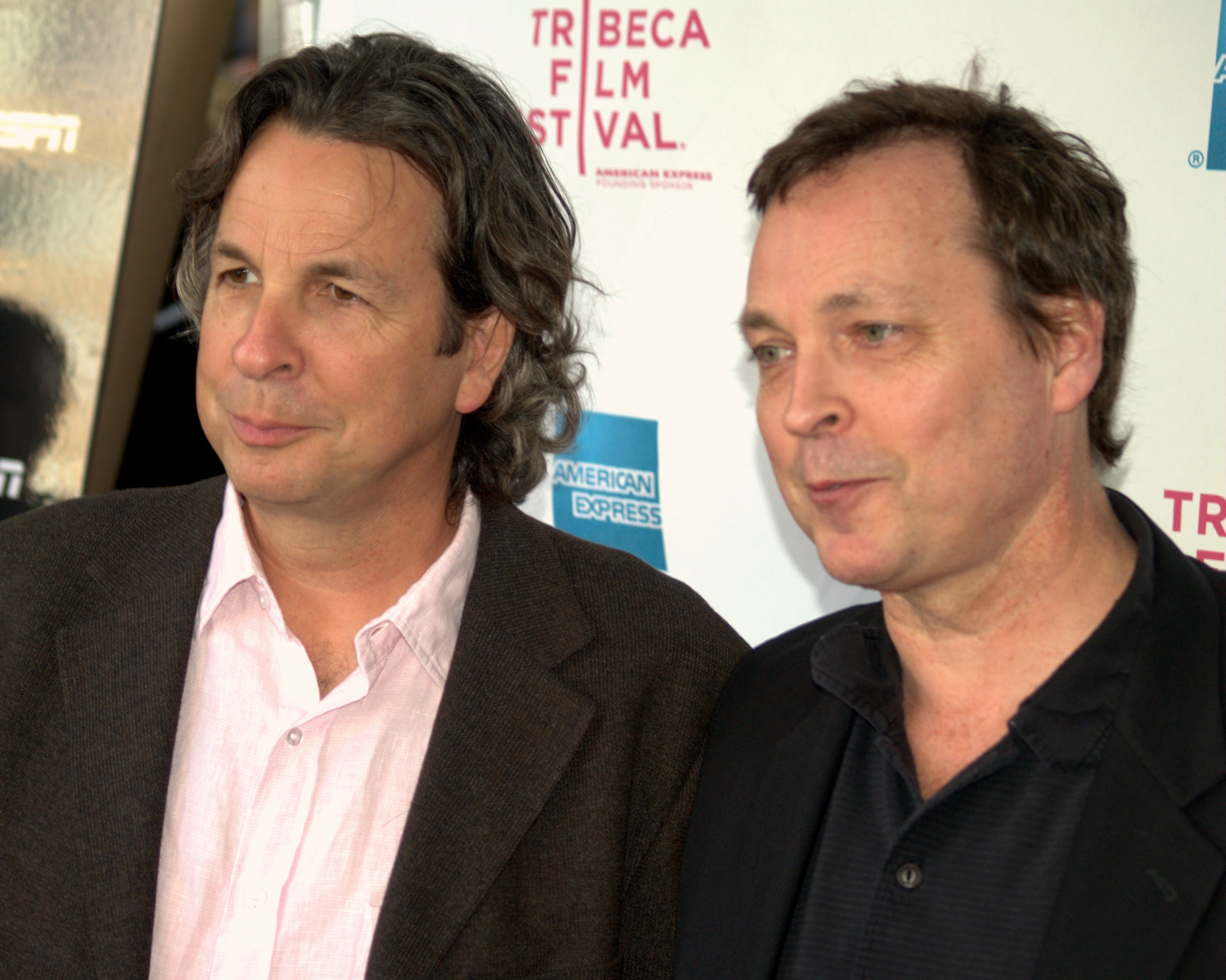
Peter Farrelly (left) and Bobby Farrelly (right) at the 2009 Tribeca Film Festival

In 2005, Farrelly co-directed Fever Pitch, a romantic comedy starring Drew Barrymore and Jimmy Fallon about a schoolteacher and Red Sox fanatic who falls in love with a business consultant. The film is an American remake of the 1997 British film of the same name, based on the novel by Nick Hornby. Also in 2005, he co-produced the controversial sports comedy film The Ringer. In 2007, he co-wrote and co-directed the romantic dark comedy film The Heartbreak Kid, which stars Ben Stiller and is a remake of the 1972 film of the same name.

In 2011, he co-directed Hall Pass, which tells the story of two friends, played by Jason Sudeikis and Owen Wilson, whose wives give them the titular hall pass from their marriage for a week. In 2012, he co-wrote and co-directed The Three Stooges, based on the 20th-century comedy trio of the same name. The film stars Chris Diamantopoulos, Sean Hayes, and Will Sasso as the titular characters. In 2014, he co-wrote and co-directed Dumb and Dumber To, the sequel to Dumb and Dumber. Set 20 years after the events of the first film, the sequel follows Jim Carrey's Lloyd and Jeff Daniels' Harry on a cross-country road trip to find Harry's adopted daughter.

In 2023, Farrelly made his solo directorial debut with the sports comedy-drama film Champions, about a basketball coach who must coach a team of players with learning disabilities after being sentenced to community service. Woody Harrelson, the feature actor of the film who worked with Farrelly in Kingpin, personally recommended Farrelly to direct the film, saying "he's a deep person and he's got the most amazing sense of humor". In 2024, he directed the Christmas comedy Dear Santa, which stars Jack Black. The film is about a boy who, while attempting to write a letter to Santa, accidentally misspells his name as Satan, which summons Satan to Earth, who offers him three wishes in exchange for his soul.

=== Television ===
In 1992, the Farrelly brothers conceived the Seinfeld episode "The Virgin" (4.10), in which Jerry dates a woman, played by Jane Leeves, who has not lost her virginity. In 2016, Farrelly directed several episodes of Season 10 of the Canadian cult mockumentary TV series Trailer Park Boys. Between 2018 and 2020, Farrelly directed several episodes of the show Loudermilk, created by Peter Farrelly and Bobby Mort. In 2020, Bobby and Peter directed the Quibi comedy series The Now.

== Awards ==
In 1999, the Farrelly brothers won the MTV Movie of the Year award for There's Something About Mary. In 2020, the Farrelly brothers received the Morton E. Ruderman Award for their sensitive and inclusive depictions of people with differing abilities in Champions. In 2023, Global Down Syndrome Foundation honored Farrelly as a Quincy Jones Exceptional Advocacy Awardee.
