= Outside Providence =

Outside Providence may refer to:

- Outside Providence (novel), a 1988 novel by Peter Farrelly
- Outside Providence (film), a 1999 adaptation of the novel
