= Outside Providence (film) =

1999 American teen stoner comedy film directed by Michael Corrente

- Promotional poster
- Directed by: Michael Corrente
- Screenplay by: Michael Corrente; Peter Farrelly; Bobby Farrelly
- Based on: Outside Providence by Peter Farrelly
- Produced by: Michael Corrente; Peter Farrelly; Bobby Farrelly; Randy Finch
- Starring: Shawn Hatosy; Jon Abrahams; Jonathan Brandis; Amy Smart; George Wendt; Alec Baldwin
- Cinematography: Richard Crudo
- Edited by: Kate Sanford
- Music by: Sheldon Mirowitz
- Production company: Conundrum Entertainment
- Distributed by: Miramax Films
- Release date: September 1, 1999
- Running time: 96 minutes
- Country: United States
- Language: English
- Budget: $7 million
- Box office: $7.3 million

Outside Providence is a 1999 American teen stoner comedy film directed by Michael Corrente. Based on the 1988 novel by Peter Farrelly, the film was written by Corrente and the brothers Peter and Bobby Farrelly. The Farrellys could not direct the film due to filming There's Something About Mary. Centering on Timothy "Dildo/Dunph" Dunphy, the film is about his life of mischief, his "incentive" to attend the Cornwall Academy preparatory boarding school, and his realization that the haze in which he has lived has to give way to something that will stay with him forever. The book is based on Peter Farrelly's experience at Kent School, a prep school in Kent, Connecticut.

== Plot ==
Timothy "Dildo/Dunph" Dunphy is in the Class of 1974 in his high school senior year living in Pawtucket, Rhode Island, comes from a troubled single parent working-class family, and is friends with those who have aspirations which do not exceed smoking marijuana at the water tower that has a view of the town. His father, Pat suffers from his wife committing suicide and appears naïve when the boys come back to the Dunphys' house to get a bong. A regularly held poker game is in progress. Pat insists that the boys be respectful and come in to say hello. The boys' intention is undetected by Pat that they are using drugs when Dunph's wheelchair-using younger brother, Jackie, attempts to hand off the bong wrapped in Dunph's coat. It falls to the floor. Jackie suggests that it is a musical horn which Pat's friend Joey asks Dunph to demonstrate, only able to make sounds about which Pat is dismissive. Pat's friends chuckle at Pat's reaction. Off the boys go on their adventures.

The guys head home with Dunph at the wheel but he is unable to see the road with the cloud of marijuana smoke filling the cab. He rear-ends a police vehicle. Pat's poker game player, Caveech, uses his influence with a local judge to replace a reform school sentence with the stipulation of parole graduating high school at Cornwall Academy, a Connecticut boys' boarding school with a sister school nearby under the same name. Failure to graduate vacates the terms of parole and he will serve a one year jail sentence.

He meets the rigid dorm master, Mr. Funderburk, who emphases learning the school rules book. Dunph learns that new friend Wheeler and other new schoolmates, a class of people that seem to have more opportunities than himself, are involved in their own mischief just like the boys back home. Billy Fu is one particular example. He is a middle eastern exchange student with "the best reefer on campus". He routinely misses classes without repercussion because his father pledges a large donation to the school on the condition that Billy graduate.

Dunph is no longer just any student at the school when "Drugs" Delaney writes Dunph with his particular colorful words and addressing the letter in the simplest of ways that the school has to open it to learn of the contents; Dunph has low regard for both the school and Mr. Funderburk. Dunph routinely gets sanctioned with work hours for breaking school rules. He also develops a friendship with a sister school student, Jane Weston, regarded as "hands down, the coolest girl in school". A romance develops and through her advice he learns about personal fulfilment which could be achieved by an education.

She and others are found out by Mr. Funderburk smoking marijuana and drinking alcohol in a dorm room of the boys' dorm. The incident is resolved, unknown to Dunph's knowledge until too late, with Jane expelled for school rules violations. Dunph feels responsible for dashing Jane's goal of attending Brown University following graduation. He concludes: Wheeler's acceptance at Yale University is weighed heavily by a letter of recommendation from Funderburk and Wheeler was caught with marijuana during an earlier raid; therefore Wheeler made his own deal with Funderburk to inform on others which resulted in Jane being expelled. Dunph resolves to see Jane's college plans revitalized by speaking with the Dean at Brown University, as he explains that she was the innocent party in the incident.

Dunph comes to terms with his father's apprehension discussing the death in the family because the latter felt responsible for imposing on her a life that she could not handle; she being too young when they married, depressed and agoraphobic. Dunph refuses to shake Funderburk's hand at the graduation ceremony in the auditorium and exits after asking his classmates for his "luggage". He then meets up with his father and Jackie as they arrive. Pat hands over an acceptance letter from the Community College of Rhode Island where Dunph points out that everyone is accepted although he could then transfer to a "senior college...where people sleep over and shit." Pat congratulates Dunph for being the first of the family to go to college and the younger brother not to be trumped surmises the possibility that it just very well may be that Jackie himself may be the first to graduate.

=== Alternate ending ===
An alternate ending is found on the DVD, which has Dunph leaving the graduation ceremonies, meeting Jackie and Clopsy, their three-legged dog. Also showing up is Jane, whom Dunph shares a passionate kiss with, which annoys Funderburk, who wastes no time in rebuking both Dunph and Jane. Dunph responds by punching Funderburk, knocking him to the sidewalk.

== Cast ==
- Shawn Hatosy as Timothy Dunphy
- Amy Smart as Jane Weston
- Alec Baldwin as Old Man Dunphy
- Jon Abrahams as Drugs Delaney
- Jonathan Brandis as Mousy
- Adam LaVorgna as Tommy the Wire
- Jesse Leach as Decenz
- Gabriel Mann as Jack Wheeler
- Jack Ferver as Irving Waltham
- Richard Jenkins as Barney
- Mike Cerrone as Caveech
- George Wendt as Joey
- Eric Brown as English teacher
- Timothy Crowe as Mr. Funderburk

== Production ==
The film was shot in late 1997, with the first day of shooting occurring on October 27, 1997. Co-writer Bobby Farrelly did an interview on the set of the film with local paper The Providence Journal on October 20, 1997, a week before shooting began. Shortly afterwards, the Farrelly brothers directed the Fox comedy There's Something About Mary, which started shooting in December 1997.

The exterior prep school scenes were filmed at the University of Rhode Island, with interior scenes filmed in the Cranston Street Armory in the west end of Providence. The Brother Adelard Ice Hockey Arena at Mount Saint Charles Academy was used for a brief scene.

== Soundtrack ==
Outside Providence: Music from the Miramax Motion Picture

Soundtrack album by Various Artists
- Released: August 24, 1999
- Recorded: 1970–1973
- Genre: Rock
- Length: 1:02:27
- Labels: Giant, Reprise Records

No.	Title	Artist	Length
1.	"Won't Get Fooled Again"	The Who	8:33
2.	"Band on the Run"	Paul McCartney and Wings	5:10
3.	"Take It Easy"	Eagles	3:28
4.	"Do You Know What I Mean"	Lee Michaels	3:12
5.	"I'd Love to Change the World"	Ten Years After	3:43
6.	"Do It Again"	Steely Dan	5:54
7.	"Long Train Runnin'"	The Doobie Brothers	3:26
8.	"All Right Now"	Free	5:33
9.	"Roundabout"	Yes	8:30
10.	"Dancing in the Moonlight"	King Harvest	2:51
11.	"No Matter What"	Badfinger	2:58
12.	"Free Bird"	Lynyrd Skynyrd	9:09
Total length:			1:02:27

Songs not featured on the soundtrack album

- "In Memory of Elizabeth Reed" by The Allman Brothers Band
- "Rock the Boat" by The Hues Corporation
- "Mississippi Queen" by Mountain
- "Hold Your Head Up" by Argent
- "Venus" by Shocking Blue
- "Don't Bogart That Joint" by Fraternity of Man
- "Magic Carpet Ride" by Steppenwolf
- "Sweet Home Alabama" by Lynyrd Skynyrd
- "The First Noel" by Billy Martin
- "Little Saint Nick" by The Beach Boys
- "Run, Run, Run" by Jo Jo Gunne
- "So Very Hard to Go" by Tower of Power
- "Showdown" by Electric Light Orchestra
- "Pomp and Circumstance" by CSR Symphony Orchestra

== Reception ==
The film recouped costs within the first month of release, with revenue exceeding the $7 million budget by $300,000.

Rotten Tomatoes gives the film a score of 52% with an average rating of 5.6/10, based on 77 reviews. The site's consensus states: "Miscasted performers and humor miss the mark." Metacritic gives the film a score of 62 out of 100 based on reviews from 32 critics, indicating "generally favorable reviews". Audiences polled by CinemaScore gave the film an average grade of "B" on an A+ to F scale.

== Home media ==
Buena Vista Home Entertainment (under the Miramax Home Entertainment banner) released Outside Providence on VHS and DVD in 2000.

In December 2010, Miramax was sold by The Walt Disney Company, their owners since 1993. That same month, the studio was taken over by private equity firm Filmyard Holdings. Filmyard licensed the home media rights for several Miramax titles to Echo Bridge Entertainment, and on January 10, 2012, Echo Bridge reissued Outside Providence on DVD with new artwork. In 2011, Filmyard Holdings licensed the Miramax library to streamer Netflix. This deal included Outside Providence, and ran for five years, eventually ending on June 1, 2016.

Filmyard Holdings sold Miramax to Qatari company beIN Media Group in March 2016. In April 2020, ViacomCBS (now known as Paramount Skydance) acquired the rights to Miramax's library, after buying a 49% stake in the studio from beIN. Outside Providence was one of the 700 titles they acquired in the deal, and since April 2020, the film has been distributed on digital platforms by Paramount Pictures.
