= Laurel Coppock =

American actress

- Years active: 2006–present
- Spouse: Bobby Mort
- Children: 2

Laurel Coppock is an American comedic actress. Coppock has appeared in several TV series and TV movies, and as a member of the Main Company of The Groundlings in Los Angeles. She is best known for her lengthy appearance in the role as "Jan" in a series of Toyota commercials, beginning in 2012 and continuing into 2026.

== Early life ==
Coppock was raised in Weston, Massachusetts, the daughter of teacher and writer Susan Coppock. Her father is a retired lawyer. She graduated from Weston High School, and attended Colby College in Maine, where she was a member of the Colbyettes, an a cappella singing group, and the Circle in the Square Theatre School in New York City.

== Career ==
She performed comedy for five years in Chicago at Second City and IO Theater, and with Boom Chicago in Amsterdam. In 2007, Coppock was an assistant crew member on Curb Your Enthusiasm, also appearing in a minor role in the episode "The N Word". She was a member of The Groundlings, along with Charlotte Newhouse and Ryan Gaul. A 2011 Los Angeles Times review noted their performance as "a cappella singers who enthusiastically perform Toto's "Africa" even though they are missing six members of their group ("Throat Culture") and know only the background and percussion parts".

In 2012, Coppock was selected to play the character "Jan" in a series of Toyota commercials. Toyota interviewed 500 actresses before selecting Coppock for the role. The advent of the character came in the wake of the success of Stephanie Courtney's Flo for Progressive Insurance, leading to the suggestion that Jan was intended as a copy of Flo, although the character of Jan was initially presented in a much more restricted way in the breadth of her activities. Coppock's Jan was also compared to Milana Vayntrub's character, Lily, who began playing a similar role in AT&T commercials around the same time, and has been described as "an amalgam of Flo and Jan". These characters were generally recognized as part of a trend in which "corporations have created their own celebrity endorsers". In 2014, when Coppock became pregnant, Toyota incorporated her pregnancy into her commercials. Toyota's ad agency Saatchi & Saatchi indicated that they would use Coppock's pregnancy "as a way to advance Jan's storyline", although it was observed that Jan, whose commercial appearances rarely develop beyond one-off jokes "doesn't really have a storyline". Coppock, as Jan, has been noted to be one of the centerpieces of an ad campaign having "one of the largest ad budgets in the auto industry". By the mid-2010s, Coppock was occasionally recognized in public for her portrayal of the commercial character. Coppock has noted that she is permitted to improvise in filming commercials in the series, and that the character has been given an extensive backstory. The campaign has also featured commercials in which Coppock sings, one in a duet, and another in a layered a capella performance. Coppock also co-wrote and appeared in the video short Comedy Jam in 2012.

During the COVID-19 pandemic in the United States, Coppock took part in the creation of a national Toyota commercial from her home, offering assurance to customers in character as Jan, with her husband, Bobby Mort, filming the scene. Toyota noted that having Coppock lead the campaign "gives it instant credibility and recognizability", as Coppock was "the trusted face of Toyota". J.D. Power noted in 2023 that Coppock was "one of the select few people who have been the face of any brand for as long as she has".

In addition to her commercial work for Toyota, Coppock has appeared in Modern Family as Lily Tucker-Pritchett's preschool teacher in the episode, "When Good Kids Go Bad", Arrested Development, the American version of The Office, and Hot in Cleveland, as well as the YouTube comedy series, The BreakWomb. In 2015, Coppock appeared in Groundlings Kung Fu Battle Island, for which her work was again highlighted by the Los Angeles Times, and in 2020, Coppock appeared in The Groundlings Theatre 45th Anniversary Show. In October 2023, it was reported that she would appear in the Groudlings' planned benefit show, One Night Only, in support of the Motion Picture & Television Fund.

== Filmography ==
=== Film ===
Year	Title	Role	Notes
2011	Crazy, Stupid, Love	Sophia	

=== Television ===
Year	Title	Role	Notes
2007	Derek and Simon	Art Gallery Patron	Episode: "In Character"
2007	Curb Your Enthusiasm	Patient	Episode: "The N Word"
2008	Downers Grove	Chatty Girl	Episode: "Open Season"
2008	Talkshow with Spike Feresten	Hollywood Reporter	Episode: "Olivia Munn and Hanson"
2011	Workaholics	Meegan	Episode: "Straight Up Juggahos"
2011	Modern Family	Miss Elaine	Episode: "When Good Kids Go Bad"
2012	The Office	Stephanie	Episode: "Trivia"
2012	Zeke and Luther	Bambi McFadden	Episode: "Accidental Hero"
2012	Hart of Dixie	Peggy	Episode: "Disaster Drills & Departures"
2012	2 Broke Girls	Kara	Episode: "And Martha Stewart Have a Ball: Part 2"
2013	Arrested Development	Maggie	Episode: "Off the Hook"
2013	Adam Devine's House Party	Ramona	Episode: "Neighbor Party"
2015	Hot in Cleveland	Emily	Episode: "Cleveland Calendar Girls"
2016	History of the World... For Now	Mary Poppins / Weather Woman / Megan	3 episodes
2016–2017	Mike Tyson Mysteries	Cathy Walker / Amy Morgan	2 episodes

== Personal life ==
Coppock has two sisters: Selena, a stand-up comic and author, and Emily, an art appraiser.

She is married to Bobby Mort, writer for The Colbert Report and co-creator of the TV show Loudermilk with Peter Farrelly. They had their first child in 2014. During her pregnancy, Coppock continued to appear as Jan in Toyota commercials, which incorporated the pregnancy into the character. Coppock was revealed to be pregnant with a second child in 2018.
