= Brian Regan (comedian) =

American comedian (born 1958)

- Born: Brian Joseph Regan; June 2, 1958 (age 68); Miami, Florida U.S.
- Spouse: Kathleen Patricia Bieszczat (m. 1997; div. 2011)
- Children: 2

Comedy career
- Years active: 1980–present
- Medium: Stand-up, television
- Genres: Observational comedy, clean comedy, self-deprecating, physical comedy
- Website: www.brianregan.com

Brian Joseph Regan (/ˈriːɡən/ REE-gən; born June 2, 1958) is an American stand-up comedian who uses observational, sarcastic, and self-deprecating humor. He is known for incorporating body language and facial expressions into his act. His performances are often described as clean as he refrains from profanity as well as taboo subject matter. Regan's material typically covers everyday events, such as shipping a package with UPS, mortgages, and visits to the optometrist. While he does not define himself as youth-oriented, Regan makes frequent references to childhood, including little league baseball, grade school spelling bees, and science projects.

Regan started out doing standup comedy in the 1980s and made his television debut on The Tonight Show with Johnny Carson in 1991. Regan subsequently released his first standup album, Brian Regan: Live in 1997 and has performed on various talk shows including The Dennis Miller Show, Late Show with David Letterman, Late Night with Conan O'Brien and The Tonight Show with Jimmy Fallon. He has since gained acclaim among fans and comedians, selling out nationwide tours and continuing to release comedy albums. In 2014 he made his film debut making an appearance in Chris Rock's comedy Top Five (2014). He starred in Peter Farrelly's dark comedy series Loudermilk (2017–2020). He has appeared twice on Jerry Seinfeld's show Comedians in Cars Getting Coffee and has released three Netflix comedy specials. In 2018, Regan's sketch comedy series Stand Up and Away! with Brian Regan which was produced by Seinfeld, was released on Netflix.

== Early life and education ==
Born in Miami, Florida to a Catholic Irish-American family from Scranton, Brian Regan was raised in Westchester, Florida. He has seven siblings, including brother Dennis Regan, who is also a stand-up comedian. He attended Christopher Columbus High School.

He attended Heidelberg College in Tiffin, Ohio where he played wide receiver on the football team. Originally he had plans of being an accountant, but one of his football coaches saw his comic routines and encouraged him to consider theater and communications. During his last semester in 1980, Regan dropped out of school to pursue stand-up comedy. He finished his degree in 1997.

== Career ==
In 1991, Regan made his first late night appearance on The Tonight Show with Johnny Carson. Regan continued standup comedy, releasing his first comedy album, Brian Regan Live, in 1997. In 2004, Regan self-released a DVD of his performance at the Irvine Improv, titled I Walked on the Moon. He was a featured comedian in a Comedy Central's animated stand-up series Shorties Watchin' Shorties. In April 2007, Regan signed a deal with Comedy Central to star in two one-hour stand-up specials, release the specials on DVD, develop a show for the network, and headline a theater tour, Brian Regan in Concert: A Comedy Central Live Event, which began June 8, 2007.

Brian's first one-hour special, Standing Up, debuted on Comedy Central on June 10, 2007. The special was recorded in April at The Barclay Theater in Irvine, CA, and a DVD of the performance was released August 14, 2007. His second Comedy Central special, entitled The Epitome of Hyperbole, premiered on September 6, 2008. A DVD of the performance was released September 9, 2008. His performance, All By Myself, is available via CD, exclusively on his website.

In 2012, Regan was the featured guest on Jerry Seinfeld's web series Comedians in Cars Getting Coffee. He is also one of the few comedians to be featured on that show twice appearing in the 2018 episode: "Are There Left Handed Spoons?". After seeing him perform standup in New Jersey, Chris Rock invited Regan to appear in his film Top Five (2014), which was his first film appearance.

In 2015, Regan made his 28th and final stand-up performance on The Late Show With David Letterman. On September 26, 2015, Regan recorded the first ever live special on Comedy Central, Brian Regan: Live from Radio City Music Hall. It was released as a video/audio album in Feb 2016.

In 2017, Regan was cast as Mugsy in Peter Farrelly's dark comedy series Loudermilk starring Ron Livingston. The series has earned critical acclaim with a 92% on Rotten Tomatoes. Creator Farrelly praised Regan on his dark subversive performance in the show by saying, "the performance [Regan] gives this year is the best performance on television this year". That same year, Regan signed a deal with Netflix and Jerry Seinfeld to release two stand-up specials, Nunchucks and Flamethrowers (2017), and Stand Up and Away! with Brian Regan (2018). On February 23, 2021, Regan released a stand-up special, On the Rocks, on Netflix.

== Influences and acclaim ==
Regan cites Johnny Carson, Steve Martin, George Carlin, Richard Pryor, and David Letterman as influences on his comedy.

Regan has received acclaim among his comedy peers, including Jerry Seinfeld who has described him as "one of my favorite, favorite stand-up comedians". Other comedians to have praised Regan include Chris Rock, Patton Oswalt, and Bill Burr.

== Discography ==
- 1992: Something's Wrong With The Regan Boy [TV Special]
- 1997: Brian Regan: Live [CD]
- 2004: I Walked on the Moon [DVD/MP3]
- 2007: Standing Up [DVD/MP3]
- 2008: The Epitome of Hyperbole [DVD/MP3]
- 2010: All by Myself [CD/MP3]
- 2015: Live From Radio City Music Hall [DVD/CD/MP3]
- 2017: Nunchucks and Flamethrowers [Netflix]
- 2021: On the Rocks [Netflix]

== Filmography ==
Film and television appearances
Year	Title	Role	Notes
1989-1990	The Pat Sajak Show	Himself	3 episodes
1990	‘’A Pair of Jokers’’	Himself	1 episode
1991	The Tonight Show with Johnny Carson	Himself	Episode: "Bob Hope / Brian Regan"
1992	A-List	Himself	Also writer
1992	Something's Wrong with the Regan Boy	Himself	Also writer
1992	The Dennis Miller Show	Himself	2 episodes
1993	Short Attention Span Theater	Himself/host	Episode: "Comedy Bootcamp"
1995–2015	Late Show with David Letterman	Himself/guest	28 episodes
1998	Dr. Katz, Professional Therapist	Himself	2 episodes
1999	The Late Late Show with Craig Kilborn	Himself	Season 2, episode 82
2000	Comedy Central Presents	Himself	Also writer
2000	Open Mic	Himself	Deleted scenes
2002	Comic Remix	Himself	2 episodes
2004, 2008	Late Night with Conan O'Brien	Himself	3 episodes
2004	Brian Regan: I Walked on the Moon	Himself	Also writer and executive producer
2004	Shorties Watchin' Shorties	Himself	3 episodes
2007	Brian Regan: Standing Up	Himself	Also writer and executive producer
2008	Brian Regan: The Epitome of Hyperbole	Himself	Also writer and executive producer
2011	The Marriage Ref	Himself/panelist	Episode: "Kathy Griffin / Ellen Pompeo / Brian Regan"
2012	Comedians in Cars Getting Coffee	Himself	Episode: "A Monkey and a Lava Lamp"
2014	Top Five	Engineer	Feature film debut
2015–2017	The Tonight Show Starring Jimmy Fallon	Himself	3 episodes
2015	Brian Regan: Live From Radio City Music Hall	Himself	Also writer and executive producer
2017	Brian Regan: Nunchucks and Flamethrowers	Himself	Also writer and executive producer
2017	Loudermilk	Mugsy Bennigan	30 episodes
2018	Comedians in Cars Getting Coffee	Himself	Episode: "Are There Left Handed Spoons?"
2018	Stand Up and Away! with Brian Regan	Himself	2 episodes and executive producer
2021	Brian Regan: On the Rocks	Himself	Also writer and executive producer
