= Scorched Earth (2018 film) =

2018 science-fiction action film

- Theatrical release poster
- Directed by: Peter Howitt
- Written by: Kevin Leeson; Bobby Mort
- Produced by: Jamie Goehring; Robert Halmi Jr. Kevin Leeson; Kevin Leslie; Jim Reeve; Shawn Williamson; Daniel Zirilli
- Starring: Gina Carano
- Cinematography: Kamal Derkaoui
- Edited by: Richard Schwadel
- Music by: Rich Walters
- Production companies: Lighthouse Pictures; Okanagan Media
- Distributed by: Cinedigm
- Release date: February 2, 2018
- Running time: 96 minutes
- Countries: Canada; United States
- Language: English

Scorched Earth is a 2018 Canadian-American post-apocalyptic science fiction/action film directed by Peter Howitt starring Gina Carano.

== Plot ==
In the not-too-distant future, the world is ravaged by brutal climate changes, colloquially known as the Cloud Fall. The combination of pollution and relentless mining of Earth's resources through industrialism has left the environment nearly unlivable and extremely hostile to human habitation. Humanity is forcefully reverted to a simpler lifestyle, relying on barter for the two most valuable resources now: Water purifiers, called tabs, and silver, ground up to line the interior of breathing masks, to keep out a painful and fatal airborne disease known as Black Lung.

Driving vehicles that use fossil fuel becomes outlawed. Anyone caught driving such a vehicle was given the maximum sentence, and numerous people have become bounty hunters, bringing in drivers and other lawbreakers in exchange for tabs and silver, dead or alive. Gage, a bounty hunter, tortures Womack, a follower of an outlaw named Chavo, leaves him in the wilderness, then locates and kills Chavo after a brutal fight, freeing several pilgrims in the process. She brings the body back to claim the reward from Sheriff Grubbs, a slightly corrupt and greedy lawman of New Montana. While there, she visits Doc, her mentor and friend. He tells her of a massive reward for Thomas Jackson, an unusually industrious outlaw who is building a shelter-town for criminals, calling it Defiance. Gage decides she wants to try taking him down alone. Doc warns that every bounty hunter that tried has been killed and strung up as a warning to other would-be bounty hunters.

Masquerading herself as Chavo, Gage makes it into Defiance unchallenged. Jackson's right-hand man, Lear, is distrustful of Gage, but is unable to prove anything, and Gage endears herself to Jackson by saving his life when Grubbs and a posse sneak into Defiance to try taking him out. Jackson decides to include Gage in his plans, which includes enslaving the entire region to work in the silver mines near his town, he offers Gage 15% of the cut of the profits in exchange for her services as a gunfighter, and unintentionally revealing a scar on his forearm, which Gage's sister had made when she bit him, before he killed her. Shortly after, Jackson took Gage, Lear and several men to capture pilgrims with armored vehicles and armed escorts. Among the pilgrims is Beatrice, one of the women Gage saved from Chavo earlier. She warns the woman to be quiet and patient. While Jackson and his men celebrate, Gage urges Melena, Jackson's girlfriend, to leave Defiance that night, revealing her identity as a bounty hunter.

She apprehends Jackson, but is captured immediately, having been betrayed by Melena, and also identified by Womack, who was now terminally infected by black lung. They briefly torture Gage, then Womack drives her out into the wilderness, and dumps her in a gorge. She survives the fall, and manages to get back to New Montana, but contracted a severe case of black lung. Doc revives her and tends her wounds, and together, the two plot to take down Jackson and the entire town of Defiance. They liberate Beatrice and the other captives from the silver mine, then engage the entire town. Gage severely wounds Lear, and is saved from a sniper by a repentant Melena. Gage pursues Jackson to the mines and fights with him, leaving him to die in an explosion using dynamite.

She returns to the town, where a wounded Doc had managed to dispatch Lear for good, cuts down the corpses hanging in the town entrance, and transports Doc back to New Montana by stretcher.

== Cast ==
- Gina Carano as Gage
- John Hannah as Doc
- Stephanie Bennett as Melena
- Patrick Gilmore as Sheriff Grubbs
- Ryan Robbins as Thomas Jackson
- Luvia Petersen as Chavo
- Patrick Sabongui as Womack
- Dean S. Jagger as Lear
- Kailey Spear as Kitty
- Nathan Mitchell as Zee
- Sarah Troyer as Young Gage
- Alisha Newton as Beatrice
- Daniel Bacon as Bartender
- Bart Anderson as Principal

== Release ==
The film was released in Canada and the United States on February 2, 2018.

== Reception ==
On review aggregator Rotten Tomatoes, the film holds a score of 18% based on 11 reviews, with an average rating of 3.7/10. Reviewer Michael Rechtshaffen of the Los Angeles Times wrote that a "decent premise — and a game Gina Carano — get left in the dust kicked up by [...] a dull, draggy post-apocalyptic western" and that "all the potential fun has been sucked out of the movie" in his negative review of the film. Reviewer Joe Lydon of Variety.com noted numerous echoes of Mad Max and A Fistful of Dollars and ultimately described it as a "VOD-ready B-movie" in his review.
