= Dear Santa (2024 film) =

2024 Christmas dark fantasy comedy film by Bobby Farrelly

- Release poster
- Directed by: Bobby Farrelly
- Screenplay by: Ricky Blitt; Peter Farrelly
- Story by: Ricky Blitt; Peter Farrelly; Dan Ewen
- Produced by: Bobby Farrelly; Jack Black; Peter Farrelly; Jeremy Kramer
- Starring: Jack Black; Keegan-Michael Key; Robert Timothy Smith; Brianne Howey; Hayes MacArthur; Post Malone; P. J. Byrne
- Cinematography: C. Kim Miles
- Edited by: Julie Garcés
- Music by: Rupert Gregson-Williams
- Production companies: Conundrum Entertainment; Farrelly Brothers; Kraymation Films
- Distributed by: Paramount Pictures
- Release date: November 25, 2024
- Running time: 107 minutes
- Country: United States
- Language: English

Dear Santa is a 2024 American comedy film directed by Bobby Farrelly, written by Ricky Blitt and Peter Farrelly from a story by Ricky Blitt, Peter Farrelly, and Dan Ewen. Starring Jack Black, Keegan-Michael Key, Robert Timothy Smith, Brianne Howey, Hayes MacArthur, Post Malone, and P. J. Byrne. It tells the story of a dyslexic and meek sixth-grader who writes a Christmas list to Santa Claus to help with his problems, only to misspell "Santa" as "Satan", who comes to Earth to offer him three wishes in exchange for his soul.

The film was released on Paramount+ and digital platforms on November 25, 2024, by Paramount Pictures, to generally negative reviews.

== Plot ==
Liam Turner is a dyslexic, meek, but polite sixth-grader whose parents Bill and Molly are having marital problems following the recent death of his brother Spencer and their move to another town. Liam is also too insecure to properly introduce his new friend Gibby to his parents and keeps embarrassing himself over his schoolmate and crush Emma, the only one in his class to defend him for his learning disorder.

To hope for things to get better, Liam writes his Christmas wishlist and mails it out, but accidentally misspells "Santa" as "Satan", who appears the next night in Liam's room. Though confused by his visitor's appearance and mannerisms, Liam still believes he is Santa. Satan decides to play along and offers to grant Liam three wishes. Liam offhandedly wishes that Emma would give him a chance, so Satan appears to him the next day in school and encourages him to approach Emma. Despite his awkwardness, Liam succeeds in getting a date with her at a Post Malone concert, for which Satan even provides VIP tickets.

Liam later tells his mother and Gibby about his encounter with "Santa", whereupon Gibby informs him of his mistake. Liam confronts Satan and tries to get out of the deal, but he refuses and tries to entice him into making his two remaining wishes, with his soul as final payment. When Liam returns home, he finds his parents waiting with child psychologist Dr. Finkleman, because of their worry that Liam's "fantasies" are gradually getting out of hand. The session is interrupted by Gibby and Satan, who take Liam to the concert. With a little help from Satan, Liam is called onto the stage, where he dances alongside Emma and Malone and the former kisses him on the cheek. Gibby, who feels left out, leaves early after a girl rejects him due to his overbite.

Later at home, when Liam talks with Gibby over the phone about the concert, he notices his friend's disappointment. Liam uses his second wish to fix Gibby's teeth, choosing not to take credit for it, and invites Gibby to join his date with Emma at the local Christmas carnival that evening. Bill and Molly, increasingly worried after eavesdropping on Liam's phone conversation, pull him away from the carnival and bring him to Finkleman's clinic. Satan tries to make Liam use up his third wish by showing him images of Gibby and Emma apparently enjoying the carnival without him. Bill and Molly's assumption that Liam has gone delusional is shattered by a nurse who shows them a video of him at the concert.

Liam angrily locks himself in his bedroom, and his regretful parents argue, bringing up the accident that killed Spencer. Overhearing them and fearing a possible divorce, he sneaks out and visits Satan at his motel room, asking him to use his third wish to keep his parents together and in love forever. Satan agrees, but declares that he will not take Liam's soul until he has died naturally. With the deal closed and believing his soul is lost, Liam, taking Satan's advice to "have fun" to heart, begins to talk back to his everyday tormentors, alienating Emma. Heartbroken, he calls Gibby and explains both Spencer's death and his second wish.

While the boys wonder where Satan is, "Satan" is revealed to be Asmodeus, a low-ranking half-demon impersonating his boss, who has failed his trial to become a full demon: by granting two unselfish wishes, he has nullified the deal for Liam's soul. The real Satan, Lucifer, banishes Asmodeus from Hell and gives him one hour to say his goodbyes. Asmodeus visits Liam and tells him about the deal's cancellation, while congratulating him on standing up for himself, and Liam figures out that he is not Satan. Before leaving, Asmodeus confesses how much he has come to like him and explains that the third wish was negated because Bill and Molly made up on their own, so he used the contents of Liam's original letter to fulfill a third and final wish. Now wanting to use his powers to help others, Asmodeus takes the form of an angelic dove and flies away.

When Christmas arrives the next day, Liam finds his brother Spencer resurrected to celebrate Christmas with his family in their new home. However, Liam panics when he gets a call from Gibby, who has convinced Emma to give him another chance by appealing to her sympathy and telling her about Spencer's death. Meanwhile, Mr. Charles, Liam's English teacher, successfully invites a crossing guard on a date, implied to have been arranged by Asmodeus.

== Cast ==
- Robert Timothy Smith as Liam Turner
- Jack Black in a triple role as
  - Asmodeus
  - "Satan"
  - "Santa Claus"
- Jaden Carson Baker as Gibby
- Kai Cech as Emma
- Brianne Howey as Molly Turner
- Hayes MacArthur as Bill Turner
- P. J. Byrne as Mr. Charles
- Keegan-Michael Key as Dr. Finkleman
- Gavin Munn as Aidan
- Post Malone as himself (credited as "Austin Post")
- Luke Chiappetta as Jock Buddy #1
- Kyle Gass as Liam's Science Teacher
- Leo Easton Kelly as Spencer Turner
- Tierre Turner as the voice of Blitzen, the Turners' cat, to whom Asmodeus grants the ability to speak
- Ben Stiller (uncredited) as Satan, aka Lucifer

== Production ==
In April 2023, it was announced that Bobby Farrelly would be directing and producing the film, with Peter Farrelly as producing along with Jeremy Kramer, for Paramount Pictures. Peter Farrelly and Ricky Blitt wrote the script from an original idea by Peter Farrelly, Ricky Blitt and Dan Ewen. The budget of the film is $150 million.

The film is Black's second Christmas film, after The Holiday in 2006; it is also his second collaboration with Farrelly, after the 2001 film Shallow Hal.

=== Casting ===
The cast was set in March 2023 with Jack Black in the lead role. Keegan-Michael Key and Post Malone were also confirmed.

=== Filming ===
Principal photography began in March 2023 in Atlanta and Decatur, Georgia, where Decatur Square was transformed into an outdoor Christmas festival. In July, production was halted because of the 2023 actors' strike.

== Release ==
Dear Santa was released on Paramount+ and digital platforms on November 25, 2024.

== Reception ==
=== Critical response ===
On the review aggregator website Rotten Tomatoes, 24% of 21 critics' reviews are positive, with an average rating of 3.9/10. The website's consensus reads: "Straight to the naughty list!" Metacritic, which uses a weighted average, assigned the film a score of 34 out of 100, based on five critics, indicating "generally unfavorable" reviews.

Brian Tallerico of RogerEbert.com gave the film one out of four stars and wrote, "There was a time when Jack Black reuniting with the Farrelly brothers to make a family comedy would have made a few cultural waves. This is not that time. Most people probably have no idea that Bobby Farrelly's Dear Santa has been buried on Paramount+, released on a Monday with almost no promotion at all. Why? The marketing team probably had no idea how to sell a movie that seems resolutely made for no one." The Guardian's Benjamin Lee gave it two out of five stars, writing, "Dear Santa is like watching Bad Santa slowly turn into Elf, an unsatisfying attempt to be both naughty and nice, ending up as nothing instead."

Frank Scheck of The Hollywood Reporter described the film overall as "mediocre", but said of Jack Black: "It should hardly come as a revelation that Black's hardworking comedic efforts are the film's saving grace. Adopting a deep growl that makes him sound like late-period Jack Nicholson, the actor is clearly having a ball with his colorful role, and the fun proves infectious. He makes the many bad jokes bearable and the decent ones even funnier with his typically manic, perfectly timed delivery."

=== Accolades ===
Year	Award / Film Festival	Category	Recipient(s)	Result	Ref.
2025	Golden Raspberry Awards	Worst Actor	Jack Black	Nominated	

== See also ==
- Dear Satan, a 2025 Filipino film of the same premise; later retitled Dear Santa
