= Clear History =

2013 film directed by Greg Mottola

- Television release poster
- Genre: Comedy
- Written by: Larry David; Alec Berg; David Mandel; Jeff Schaffer
- Directed by: Greg Mottola
- Starring: Larry David; Bill Hader; Jon Hamm; Kate Hudson; Michael Keaton; Danny McBride; Eva Mendes; Amy Ryan; J. B. Smoove
- Music by: Ludovic Bource
- Country of origin: United States
- Original language: English

Production
- Executive producers: Bradley Thomas; Greg Mottola; Alec Berg; David Mandel; Jeff Schaffer
- Producer: Monica Levinson
- Cinematography: Jim Denault
- Editor: Steven Rasch
- Running time: 100 minutes
- Production company: HBO Films

Original release
- Network: HBO
- Release: August 10, 2013

Clear History is a 2013 American comedy television film directed by Greg Mottola, written by Larry David, Alec Berg, David Mandel and Jeff Schaffer, and starring David, Kate Hudson, Danny McBride, Philip Baker Hall, Jon Hamm, Michael Keaton, Eva Mendes, Amy Ryan, Bill Hader and J. B. Smoove. The film premiered on August 10, 2013, on HBO.

== Plot ==
In 2003, bearded, long-haired Nathan Flomm is an opinionated, obnoxious business associate of Will Haney, whose company in San Jose, California, is about to introduce a new electric car. Flomm objects to the car being named "the Howard" after Haney's son, who is himself named after Howard Roark, hero of The Fountainhead. After Flomm accepts a severance package to cut ties with the company, he becomes a ridiculed public figure when the Howard is a huge success, costing Flomm what would have been his share — a billion dollars.

Ten years later, a balding, clean-shaven Flomm has changed his name to Rolly DaVore and moved to Martha's Vineyard, beginning a new life and making new acquaintances. They include new best friend Frank, now former lover Wendy, and local building contractor Mr. McKenzie.

Frank takes Flomm (a.k.a. Rolly) to a surprise birthday party where he punches Jaspar, the only black person at the party, after a loud welcome by Rolly's friends surprises him. Flomm ruins Jaspar's budding romance with Jennifer, a formerly heavy-set woman, when he advises her to date other men before settling. Jaspar concludes Flomm is a racist. When learning that the rock band Chicago is returning to the Vineyard for the first time in 20 years, Flomm hears a rumor that Wendy had sex with multiple members of the band after that concert. He is upset that everyone seems to know about this but him.

Haney, now a wealthy mogul, arrives on the island with wife Rhonda and begins building an ostentatious mansion on the site of "Blue Heron," the former Stumpo family home. Flomm is relieved that Haney does not recognize him, but cannot bear to remain on the island. However, inspired by the movie The Fountainhead, Flomm becomes determined to gain revenge for his lost billion dollars by blowing up Haney's mansion. Frank introduces him to explosives expert Joe Stumpo and Stumpo's friend Rags. He then persuades McKenzie, the construction foreman, to let him be part of the crew.

Stumpo needs a detonator. Flomm meets with Tibor, a Chechen criminal, and pays him $1,000. While driving away, Flomm has a fender-bender with Tibor's new car (a Howard). Tibor demands Flomm pay for the damage. Jaspar discovers Flomm's true identity and warns if Jennifer dates another man he will make Flomm's identity known. Jennifer takes up with Tibor. Flomm worms his way into a close friendship with Haney's wife Rhonda, pretending to know about architecture and engineering. Flomm lies to Tibor that Jennifer had performed oral sex on members of the band Chicago.

Flomm concludes from Rhonda's attentions that she is attracted to him, which will now be his revenge, rather than blowing up the Haneys' new house. During a heated argument over who should move their car, Flomm mistakes her passion and kisses her. Rhonda is repulsed, asking: "Are you crazy?"

Flomm proceeds with the plotted destruction of the house, to occur during Chicago's concert performance, when no one will be home. The band tells Flomm that two of them did indeed receive oral sex from Wendy on their previous visit. Jaspar becomes furious at seeing Jennifer with Tibor and informs the local newspaper of Rolly's true identity. Haney turns up at the concert and shocks Flomm by embracing him, saying he's been trying to locate him for years. He wants to pay Flomm the billion dollars, feeling guilty over their falling out. Flomm is elated, but now must stop Stumpo and Rags from destroying the mansion, which, it turns out, is being built for the benefit of sick and underprivileged children. Flomm arrives too late. The house explodes just as a bus filled with children arrives.

The three end up serving three years in prison. Bearded and shaggy-haired again after his release, Flomm returns to Martha's Vineyard, reunites with Frank and runs into Jennifer, who is overweight again. They decide to go on a date. Flomm, after a haircut and shave, is welcomed back by his poker buddies. One refers to Haney and Rhonda having gone back to California. Wendy has inherited millions of dollars from an elderly woman. The friends thank Flomm for destroying the ugly mansion. They say the Chicago concert was great and that everybody had a great time, including the band, as Flomm learns to his horror, Jennifer did perform fellatio on band members this time.

== Cast ==
- Larry David as Nathan Flomm, a disgraced former marketing executive, now living alone under the name Rolly DaVore
- Bill Hader as Rags, Stumpo's friend and henchman
- Philip Baker Hall as McKenzie, a foreman
- Jon Hamm as Will Haney, Flomm's former boss
- Kate Hudson as Rhonda Haney, Will's wife
- Michael Keaton as Joe Stumpo, a quarry operator
- Danny McBride as Frank, Flomm's best friend
- Eva Mendes as Jennifer
- Amy Ryan as Wendy, Flomm's ex-girlfriend
- J. B. Smoove as Jaspar
- Liev Schreiber as Tibor

Members of the rock band Chicago appear as themselves.

Schreiber's appearance remains officially uncredited due to his involvement in Ray Donovan, broadcast by HBO's rival network Showtime.

== Production ==
The film began principal photography in July 2012. The film was shot on location in the Massachusetts towns of Marblehead, Topsfield, Essex, West Gloucester, North Andover, and Beverly, including the North Shore Music Theatre. Around 300 full-time workers were needed on-set. Filming wrapped in November 2012. The film premiered on August 10, 2013, on HBO.

== Release ==
=== Critical response ===
On Rotten Tomatoes, the film has an approval rating of 61% based on 28 reviews, with an average rating of 6.5/10. The website's critical consensus reads, "Its semi-improvised structure finds Larry David squarely in his wheelhouse, but with few laughs and a muddled message, it doesn't live up to his usual standards." The review aggregation website Metacritic, which assigns a rating to reviews, gave the film a weighted average score of 69 out of 100, based on 17 critics, indicating "generally favorable" reviews.

Linda Stasi of the New York Post gave the film three and a half stars out of four, writing, "Clear History is so funny it made me want to order up some Palestinian chicken." Brian Lowry of Variety gave the film an unfavorable review, writing, "Clear History yields the occasional chuckle, but somewhat curbed enthusiasm." David Hiltbrand of The Philadelphia Inquirer wrote, "Despite a number of funny lines sprinkled through the script, this History isn't very memorable." Matthew Gilbert of The Boston Globe wrote, "Even if you do like David’s shtick, as I do, you have no business here. The movie plays out something like an extra-long but subpar episode of Curb Your Enthusiasm." Allison Keene of The Hollywood Reporter reviewed the film favorably, writing, "With its seaside setting and lighthearted fun, Clear History is a kind of pleasant, late-summer gazpacho, enjoyed to the sounds of Chicago and debates about whether there is a racial preference between black and white dwarves. That last part should prove that while Larry David might look and feel a little different in this project, he could never be mistaken, like Flomm is, for anyone else."

Robert Bianco of USA Today wrote, "If you're a fan of Curb Your Enthusiasm, think of this as an extended version of Curb. If you're not, History will not convert you." Hank Stuever of The Washington Post wrote, "It has a nice, confident and well-edited breeze to it (including a lot of jokes about the band Chicago), with a fun cast that includes standout riffs from Michael Keaton, Danny McBride and Eva Mendes." Laura Bennett of The New Republic wrote, "Clear History was improvised from 35 pages of script. 'You are such an asshole!', one Vineyard resident tells Flomm, which is the movie's main revelation."

=== Home media ===
Clear History was released on DVD and Blu-ray on November 5, 2013, and can be seen on Max.
