= Bobby Mort =

American actor, writer, and producer

Bobby Mort is an American actor, writer, and producer known for co-creating, writing, and executive producing Loudermilk. From 2012 to 2014, Mort was a staff writer on The Colbert Report, for which he received a Primetime Creative Arts Emmy Award for Outstanding Writing for a Variety Series.

Mort is married to actress and comedian Laurel Coppock, with whom he has two children.

Mort, along with David "Ace" M. Gutiérrez, created the comic strip "Mr. Ghost Adventures" under the BobbyDavid banner.

== Filmography ==
=== Writing ===
Year	Title	Notes
1994	The Bozo Super Sunday Show	Staff writer
2010	Circle of Pain	Television film
2010	Locked Down	Story
2012–2014	The Colbert Report	102 episodes
2017–2020	Loudermilk	30 episodes; also co-creator and executive producer
2018	Scorched Earth	Co-writer

=== Acting ===
==== Film ====
Year	Title	Role	Notes
2004	Under the City	Cosmo Joel	
2005	Dead Men Walking	Chompy	

==== Television ====
Year	Title	Role	Notes
2005, 2006	Untold Stories of the E.R.	Concerned Bystander / Mike	2 episodes
2007	Derek and Simon	Art Gallery Patron	Episode: "In Character"
2007	Curb Your Enthusiasm	Waiter	Episode: "The N Word"
