= The Comedy Writer =

1998 novel by Peter Farrelly

- Author: Peter Farrelly
- Language: English
- Publisher: Doubleday
- Publication date: May 1, 1998
- Publication place: United States
- ISBN: 0-385-49052-6

The Comedy Writer is a 1998 novel by American filmmaker Peter Farrelly.

== Plot ==
The story revolves around Henry Halloran, a young man who quits his sales job in New England and moves to Los Angeles to pursue his dream of becoming a comedic screenwriter. Henry's pursuit is an arduous one, involving many humiliating rejections, low-paying waitstaff jobs to pay the bills, and a grating, unwanted female roommate.

== Critical reception ==
Publishers Weekly, "Farrelly's taste for slapstick and scatological humor will either delight or offend, according to the reader's taste."

Kirkus Reviews, "A winner, nicely skewering some of the weirder elements of life in lotusland, though not as black-witted and biting as some other recent Hollywood fiction."
