= Hall Pass =

2011 film by the Farrelly brothers

- UK release poster
- Directed by: Peter Farrelly; Bobby Farrelly
- Screenplay by: Bobby Farrelly; Peter Farrelly; Pete Jones; Kevin Barnett
- Story by: Pete Jones
- Produced by: Charles B. Wessler; Bradley Thomas; Bobby Farrelly; Peter Farrelly
- Starring: Owen Wilson; Jason Sudeikis; Jenna Fischer; Richard Jenkins; Christina Applegate; Stephen Merchant
- Cinematography: Matthew F. Leonetti
- Edited by: Sam Seig
- Music by: Rolfe Kent
- Production companies: New Line Cinema; Conundrum Entertainment; Charles B. Wessler Entertainment
- Distributed by: Warner Bros. Pictures
- Release date: February 25, 2011
- Running time: 105 minutes
- Country: United States
- Language: English
- Budget: $36 million
- Box office: $83.2 million

Hall Pass is a 2011 American comedy film produced and directed by the Farrelly brothers and co-written by them along with Pete Jones, the writer/director of Stolen Summer. It stars Owen Wilson, Jason Sudeikis, Jenna Fischer, Richard Jenkins, Stephen Merchant, and Christina Applegate.

Rick and Fred, two husbands who are having difficulty in their marriages, are given hall passes by their wives: for one week, they are allowed to have sex with other women.

The film was produced by New Line Cinema, Conundrum Entertainment and Charles B. Wessler Entertainment and distributed by Warner Bros. Pictures, and was theatrically released on February 25, 2011. The film received mixed reviews from critics and was a moderate box office success by grossing over $83 million.

== Plot ==
Best friends Rick and Fred are in stagnant marriages with their wives, Grace and Maggie. They discuss how they miss their single days, so their wives give them a "hall pass": a week during which they can disconnect from their lives and potentially have sex with other women. Rick and Fred try to pick up women with their friends Gary, Flats, and Hog Head while Maggie and Grace decide they should get hall passes, too.

Four days into the week, Rick goes to his favorite coffee shop, where he flirts with the attractive waitress Leigh, angering her co-worker Brent, who wants her for himself. Rick and she later meet at her gym and she invites him for a beer after they work out. He falls asleep in the hot tub for several hours, leaving his muscles too weak to use; two naked men have to help him get out. Meanwhile, Grace and minor league baseball player Gerry get closer, and Maggie finds herself attracted to Gerry's coach.

On day six, Rick and Fred go to a bar with their single, womanizing friend Coakley. There Rick meets his children's babysitter Paige, who has just turned 21 and is partying with her aunt Meg. She is attracted to him, but he turns her down to dance with Leigh.

Later, Rick parties at Coakley's while Fred takes a woman to his hotel room. However, she feels sick and, after a minor incident in the bathroom, is sent home in a taxi by Fred before anything happens. Later that evening, Meg shows up at the room and mistaking Fred for Rick, seduces him.

Meanwhile, Gerry's coach tries to seduce Maggie but she rebuffs him. Grace, on the other hand, has sex with Gerry but tells him she cannot see him again; he agrees, saying she is too old for him. On her way back home, she feels guilty about cheating on Fred and has a car accident.

At Coakley's house, Leigh offers Rick casual sex. To his own surprise, he turns her down, saying he loves Maggie too much to cheat on her. After answering Fred's phone, Rick learns of Grace's accident and rushes to the hotel to tell him. In the lobby he finds Paige, who thinks he was having sex with Meg. They enter the room and find Fred with her. After finding out he is not Rick, Meg kicks Fred in the face.

Upon hearing about Grace's accident, Fred tries to go to the hospital but finds Brent vandalizing what he thinks is Rick's car because of jealousy over Leigh. On seeing Meg (his mother) at the hotel, Brent thinks Fred has had sex with her and tries to kill him, but Paige and Meg tackle him. Rick and Fred go to the hospital with Brent and the police in pursuit. At the hospital, Brent is arrested for attacking them.

Rick goes home to Maggie. He tells her he did not use the hall pass and confesses that she is the only woman he has ever been with. Moved, she tells him she did not use her hall pass either, they reconcile and have sex for the first time in months. Fred and Grace also reconcile and decide to stick to not divulge, as per the 'hall pass'. However, he ultimately reveals that he fingered Meg when Grace asks him to take her to see Kathy Griffin.

During the credits, Fred hosts a barbecue where he pays Kathy Griffin to be present. Gary's wife suggests that she give him a hall pass. Gary imagines sleeping with a married woman and then accidentally killing her, her entire family, and several bystanders and being raped in prison; but he then shrugs it off and agrees to "give it a whirl".

== Cast ==
- Owen Wilson as Rick Mills, Maggie's husband
- Jason Sudeikis as Fred Searing, Grace's husband
- Jenna Fischer as Maggie Mills, Rick's wife
- Christina Applegate as Grace Searing, Fred's wife
- Joy Behar as Dr. Lucy Gilbert
- Nicky Whelan as Leigh, the Australian barista
- Bruce Thomas as Coach Rick Coleman
- Alexandra Daddario as Paige
- Alyssa Milano as Mandy Bohac
- Andrew Wilson as Larry Bohac
- Derek Waters as Brent
- Kristin Carey as Aunt Meg
- Tyler Hoechlin as Gerry
- Stephen Merchant as Gary Putney
- J. B. Smoove as Flats
- Larry Joe Campbell as Andrew "Hog Head" McCormick
- Richard Jenkins as Coakley
- Rob Moran as Ed Long
- Lauren Bowles as Britney Long
- Dwight Evans as Maggie's father
- Armie Hammer as Bouncer
- Bo Burnham as Bartender
- Vanessa Angel as Missy Frankinopoulos

== Production ==
The project began as a spec script written by Pete Jones that the Farrelly brothers purchased in September 2005, paying a "high six-figure[s]." Conundrum Entertainment, the Farrelly brothers' production partnership with Bradley Thomas, produced the film, along with Charlie Wessler. Owen Wilson was the first of the two leads to commit to the project; Sudeikis was the Farrelly brothers' choice for the other lead role, but as of January 2010 it was still uncertain whether his commitment to his work on Saturday Night Live permitted his participation.

Principal photography began in February 2010 in Atlanta, with Christina Applegate, Alyssa Milano, Larry Joe Campbell and Vanessa Angel as late additions to the cast. Although filmed in Georgia, the film's setting, like most Farrelly brothers films, is New England; specifically Providence, Rhode Island. Georgia was chosen due to incentives introduced by the Georgia Entertainment Industry Investment Act of 2008; according to the Film, Music and Digital Entertainment Division of the Georgia Department of Economic Development, Hall Pass was part of Hollywood's nearly one billion outlay in the state during 2010; Marc Fischer, an executive producer of Hall Pass, called Atlanta both more economical and easier to shoot in than Boston. Fischer, also an executive producer for the Farrelly brothers' The Three Stooges, had by May 2010 already begun pre-production work in Georgia for that film.

Amanda Bynes was originally set to star in the film, but was replaced by Alexandra Daddario shortly after filming began. Bynes later admitted she pulled out of the production due to her now well-known substance abuse and mental health issues.

Hall Pass is the third film in which Jason Sudeikis and Christina Applegate starred together, the others being The Rocker and Going the Distance.

== Reception ==
=== Box office ===
Hall Pass was #1 on opening day with $4.6 million, and initial estimates showed it at #2 for the weekend behind Gnomeo & Juliet, but Gnomeo & Juliet was overestimated and brought down to #2, putting Hall Pass in first with $13.5 million in its opening weekend. It eventually grossed $45 million in North America and $38.2 million in other territories to a total of $83.2 million worldwide against a budget of $36 million.

=== Critical response ===
On review aggregator website Rotten Tomatoes, the film has an approval rating of 32% based on 176 reviews and an average rating of 4.70/10. The site's critical consensus reads, "Some filmgoers may be surprised by the Farrellys' defense of traditional domestic values in Hall Pass – unfortunately, they'll probably also be dismayed by the absence of laughs." On Metacritic, the film has a score of 45 out of 100 based on 36 critics, indicating "mixed or average" reviews. Audiences polled by CinemaScore gave the film an average grade of "B−" on an A+ to F scale.

Critic Roger Ebert gave the film two and a half out of four stars, saying, "A problem with Hall Pass, I think, is that both Owen Wilson and Jason Sudeikis are affable, and the movie wants us to like them. It is often more useful for a comedy to have characters whose embarrassment we enjoy." Charlie Lyne's UltraCulture film blog said that the film's biggest problem wasn't its attitude to women (although that was brought into question), but its "disguising of an inherently conservative movie as some kind of anything-goes frat house sex romp." "[W]e’re supposed to cheer on both attitudes with equal vigour and that simply doesn’t work when the film flits between them with such frequency." British newspaper The Telegraph named Hall Pass one of the ten worst films of 2011, saying, "Hall Pass is outright hideous and also embarrassing, like a creepy uncle sporting a backwards baseball cap and cracking bad, lewd jokes for the under-thirties. At a funeral."
