= Loudermilk (TV series) =

American comedy-drama TV series

- Genre: Comedy-drama; Black comedy
- Created by: Peter Farrelly; Bobby Mort
- Directed by: Peter Farrelly; Bobby Farrelly
- Starring: Ron Livingston; Will Sasso; Anja Savcic; Laura Mennell
- Opening theme: "Stand on the Horizon" by Franz Ferdinand
- Composer: Dave Palmer
- Country of origin: United States
- Original language: English
- No. of seasons: 3
- No. of episodes: 30

Production
- Executive producers: Peter Farrelly; Bobby Mort; Christopher Long; Shane Elrod; Bart Peters; Mark Burg; David Guillod; Kate Regan; Bobby Farrelly
- Producers: Kate Regan; Jonathan I. Schwartz
- Production locations: Vancouver, British Columbia, Canada
- Cinematography: David Pelletier
- Editors: Allan Lee; Jorelle Miranda
- Running time: 27–30 minutes
- Production company: Primary Wave Entertainment

Original release
- Network: Audience (seasons 1–2); Amazon Prime Video (season 3)
- Release: October 17, 2017 – December 31, 2020

Loudermilk is an American comedy-drama television series created by Peter Farrelly and Bobby Mort. The series stars Ron Livingston, Will Sasso, Laura Mennell, Anja Savcic, Mat Fraser, Toby Levins, and Mark Brandon. The show premiered on October 17, 2017, on the AT&T Audience Network. In December 2018, it was announced that Audience had renewed the series for a third season. In April 2020, the series was left without a home after the network ceased operations.

Amazon subsequently acquired the rights to stream the series, and the previously unaired third season was released on Amazon Prime Video in some countries, such as Canada, in December 2020. The series made its U.S. debut in March 2021, while the third season was added the following month.

Additional seasons were planned, but not produced as of 2025, since the show could not find a network willing to offset the production costs.

== Premise ==
Sam Loudermilk, a former music critic and a recovering alcoholic, is a substance abuse support group leader living in Seattle, who regularly doles out clever but acid-tongued critiques to his clients, his friends, and any random person he interacts with. Loudermilk, who does not have his life together in the way one might expect of a counselor, is somewhat nicer to the few people close to him, including his best friend and (usually) sober sponsor, Ben Burns, and his sponsee and unplanned roommate, Claire Wilkes.

Frequent scenes depict Loudermilk's group sessions at a local church, with subplots deriving from the group members' lives. Farrelly expressed particular pride at the arc of Mugsy (Brian Regan) during season 3, where the character gradually rebuilds his relationship with his children before relapsing. The character of Cutter (Danny Wattley) features in a prominent subplot in season 1; Wattley was unable to reprise the role in seasons 2 and 3 after himself relapsing, but after going through recovery was planned to appear in a fourth season.

== Cast and characters ==
=== Main ===
- Ron Livingston as Sam Loudermilk
- Will Sasso as Ben Burns
- Anja Savcic as Claire Wilkes
- Laura Mennell as Allison Montgomery (seasons 1–2)

=== Recurring ===
- Brian Regan as Winston "Mugsy" Bennigan
- Ricky Blitt as New Guy (Hiram)
- Timothy Webber as Ed
- Viv Leacock as Stevie
- Jackie Flynn as Tony
- Mat Fraser as Roger Frostly
- Sam Bob as Cloud
- Tyler Layton-Olson as Cisco
- Eric Keenleyside as Father Michael
- Danny Wattley as Cutter (season 1)
- Benjamin Rogers as Felix Furbush
- Anna Galvin as Jane Wilkes (season 1; guest seasons 2–3)
- Brendan McNamara as Tom Blitt (seasons 1 and 3)
- Melinda Dahl as Annette (seasons 2–3; guest season 1)
- Sofiya Cheyenne as Louise (season 2; guest season 3)
- Elisabeth Maurus (Lissie) as Lizzie Poole (season 3)

=== Guest ===
- Edward Barbanell as Charlie
- Andrew Francis as Kevin (season 1)
- Tom Butler as Jack Loudermilk
- Lauren Wasser as Memphis (season 1)
- Matty Finochio as Garrett Mason-Burke (seasons 1–2)
- Cassandra Naud as Cappy (season 3)
- Michael Buie as Tiger Kaminsky

== Episodes ==
Season	Episodes	Originally released	
Season	Episodes	First released	Last released
1	10	October 17, 2017	December 19, 2017
2	10	October 16, 2018	December 18, 2018
3	10	December 31, 2020	December 31, 2020

=== Season 1 (2017) ===
Loudermilk season 1 episodes
No. overall	No. in season	Title	Directed by	Written by	Original release date
1	1	"A Girl in Trouble Is a Temporary Thing"	Peter Farrelly	Bobby Mort & Peter Farrelly	October 17, 2017
2	2	"Shark Week"	Peter Farrelly	Bobby Mort & Peter Farrelly	October 24, 2017
3	3	"You're Only as Sick as Your Secrets"	Peter Farrelly	Danny Smith	October 31, 2017
4	4	"It's All About the Beans"	Peter Farrelly	Dave Connaughton & John Trozak	November 7, 2017
5	5	"There's a New Kid in Town"	Peter Farrelly	Dave Connaughton, John Trozak & Peter Farrelly	November 14, 2017
6	6	"Lay, Lady, Lay"	Peter Farrelly	Dave Connaughton, John Trozak & Peter Farrelly	November 21, 2017
7	7	"Father of the Year"	Peter Farrelly	Bobby Mort & Peter Farrelly	November 28, 2017
8	8	"Invitation Only"	Peter Farrelly	Shira Hoffman & Peter Farrelly	December 5, 2017
9	9	"Highway 10 Revisited"	Peter Farrelly	Ricky Blitt	December 12, 2017
10	10	"Bourbon Street"	Peter Farrelly	Bobby Mort & Peter Farrelly	December 19, 2017

=== Season 2 (2018) ===
Loudermilk season 2 episodes
No. overall	No. in season	Title	Directed by	Written by	Original release date
11	1	"Everybody's Got Something to Hide Except for Me and My Monkey"	Peter Farrelly	Bobby Mort & Peter Farrelly	October 16, 2018
12	2	"Cruel to Be Kind"	Peter Farrelly	Bobby Mort	October 23, 2018
13	3	"All Apologies"	Peter Farrelly	Jimmy Dunn, Jackie Flynn & Peter Farrelly	October 30, 2018
14	4	"White Rabbit"	Bobby Farrelly	Dave Connaughton & John Trozak	November 6, 2018
15	5	"I Fought the Law"	Bobby Farrelly	Dave Connaughton & John Trozak	November 13, 2018
16	6	"Our Lips Are Sealed"	Bobby Farrelly	Ricky Blitt	November 20, 2018
17	7	"He Ain't Heavy"	Bobby Farrelly	Danny Smith	November 27, 2018
18	8	"Iron Man"	Bobby Farrelly	Kate Schriver & Laura Streicher	December 4, 2018
19	9	"Saturday Night's Alright for Fighting"	Bobby Farrelly	Jim Freeman & Brian Jarvis	December 11, 2018
20	10	"Don't Go Away Mad (Just Go Away)"	Bobby Farrelly	Bobby Mort & Peter Farrelly	December 18, 2018

=== Season 3 (2020) ===
Loudermilk season 3 episodes
No. overall	No. in season	Title	Directed by	Written by	Original release date
21	1	"Stuck in the Middle with You"	Bobby Farrelly	Bobby Mort & Peter Farrelly	December 31, 2020
22	2	"There Goes My Baby"	Bobby Farrelly	John Jordan & Thomas Jordan	December 31, 2020
23	3	"American Idiot"	Bobby Farrelly	Bobby Mort	December 31, 2020
24	4	"Hit Me Baby One More Time"	Peter Farrelly	Jackie Flynn, Jimmy Dunn & Peter Farrelly	December 31, 2020
25	5	"Just What I Needed"	Bobby Farrelly	Laura Streicher & Kate Schriver	December 31, 2020
26	6	"Hard for Me to Say I'm Sorry"	Peter Farrelly	Dave Connaughton & John Trozak	December 31, 2020
27	7	"Wind Beneath My Wings"	Bobby Farrelly	Ricky Blitt	December 31, 2020
28	8	"Resurrection Shuffle"	Bobby Farrelly	Danny Smith	December 31, 2020
29	9	"Should Have Known Better"	Peter Farrelly	Yassir Lester & Peter Farrelly	December 31, 2020
30	10	"When I'm Alone"	Bobby Farrelly	Peter Farrelly & Bobby Mort	December 31, 2020

== Production ==
Loudermilk originally premiered on AT&T's Audience Network. Its first season debuted in 2017. On April 12, 2018, Audience renewed the series for a second season, which it premiered on October 16, 2018. On December 5, 2018, it was announced that Audience had renewed the series for Season 3, but the network ceased operations in May 2020 before it could air. Amazon Prime Video acquired the rights for the show and released Seasons 1 & 2 on March 12, 2021. On April 27, 2021, the third season premiered on Amazon Prime.

Despite being based in Seattle, Loudermilk is filmed in Vancouver, British Columbia, Canada. Episode writing contributors include Bobby Mort who previously worked for The Colbert Report, as well as Family Guy alums Ricky Blitt (who also plays Hiram in the cast) and Danny Smith.

== Music ==
The first season uses tracks from Andy Shauf's album The Party as incidental and atmospheric score, with an eclectic soundtrack as a nod to Sam Loudermilk's past as a music critic.

== Reception ==
Review aggregator Rotten Tomatoes gives the first season an approval rating of 92% based on reviews from 12 critics, with an average rating of 7.12 out of 10. The site's critical consensus states:

Loudermilk's timely premise and sharp writing lay a solid foundation for a strong central performance from Ron Livingston, perfectly cast in this endearing dark comedy about a rock critic turned recovering alcoholic.

== Distribution ==
The series is distributed by Sony Pictures TV; and in Canada, Germany, Italy, the U.K. In the United States, Amazon Prime released the series in 2021, debuting Season 3 in the same year. Netflix aired the series in 2023 through June 2025 to notable success. Amazon Prime's streaming rights were not renewed in 2024 and have already expired. Tubi last aired the series for a year ending March 2026.

A DVD Release of Season 1 was released in UK/Europe in 2018 on Via Vision Entertainment. No releases of Season 2 and 3 have been made on physical media.

=== Future ===
Though the cast was released from any contractual obligations to produce further episodes after the shutdown of Audience Network, co-creator Peter Farrelly has stated that "everybody wants to come back and do Season 4", and that a production network was being sought in October 2020. In total, Farrelly has envisioned seven seasons' worth of plotlines and character arcs.
