= Stuck on You (film) =

- Theatrical release poster
- Directed by: Peter Farrelly; Bobby Farrelly
- Screenplay by: Peter Farrelly; Bobby Farrelly
- Story by: Bennett Yellin; Charles B. Wessler; Peter Farrelly; Bobby Farrelly
- Produced by: Peter Farrelly; Bobby Farrelly; Bradley Thomas; Charles B. Wessler
- Starring: Matt Damon; Greg Kinnear; Eva Mendes; Seymour Cassel; Cher
- Cinematography: Dan Mindel
- Edited by: Christopher Greenbury; Dave Terman
- Music by: Charlie Gartner
- Production companies: Conundrum Entertainment; Charles B. Wessler Entertainment
- Distributed by: 20th Century Fox
- Release date: December 12, 2003
- Running time: 118 minutes
- Country: United States
- Language: English
- Budget: $55 million
- Box office: $65.8 million

Stuck on You is a 2003 American comedy film written and directed by the Farrelly brothers, and starring Matt Damon and Greg Kinnear as conjoined twin brothers, whose differing aspirations provide both conflict and humorous situations, in particular when one of them wishes to move to Hollywood to pursue a career as an actor.

Stuck on You was released by 20th Century Fox on December 12, 2003. The film received positive reviews from critics and grossed $65.8 million against a $55 million budget.

== Plot ==
Conjoined twins Bob and Walt Tenor try to live as normally as possible. Extroverted Walt aspires to be a Hollywood actor, whereas Bob is introverted and shy.

The twins run Quikee Burger, a diner in Oak Bluffs on Martha's Vineyard, guaranteeing free meals if orders are not completed in three minutes, showing how skilled and in sync Bob and Walt are. Walt is comfortable interacting with women, but Bob is shyer. He has a long-distance relationship with pen pal May Fong from California, whom he has never met and has not told he is a conjoined twin.

Walt stars in a one-man show, while Bob stays as much as possible in the background, as he has stage fright. As the play is successful, Walt follows his dream to Hollywood, persuading his hesitant brother to go along for the ride.

They rent an apartment in California and become friends with fellow aspiring actress April Mercedes. When she asks about their conjoinment, Walt explains they share a liver that is mostly Bob's. As surgical separation is risky for Walt, Bob would not consent, even though Walt wanted it. It is also why Walt looks older than Bob. (Note: Greg Kinnear is seven years older than Matt Damon in real life.)

Walt has difficulty finding acting work in Hollywood, and his agent, Morty O'Reilly, is unhelpful, offering at one point to get him a job in a pornographic film. Cher is upset that she is set to star in a prime-time TV show called Honey and the Beaze. Wanting out, she hires Walt as her co-star, certain it will get cancelled. The producers realize her scheme and foil it by going forward, compensating for Bob's presence by keeping him out of the camera frame and employing bluescreen effects. The show is a surprise hit and Walt becomes famous.

Walt arranges for May Fong to meet Bob without his consent. They develop a romantic relationship, though the twins' attempt to keep their conjoined nature a secret proves challenging, especially as Walt must accompany them everywhere, sometimes using creative solutions like disguising himself as a giant teddy bear. Eventually, when May discovers them in bed, she concludes they are a gay couple rather than brothers. Although Bob shows her they are indeed conjoined twins, shocked at the lie, she flees.

Morty informs the twins that word has leaked about them being conjoined. Rather than hide this, they embrace it, becoming huge celebrities, making commercials and appearing on The Tonight Show with Jay Leno. While Walt enjoys this success, he knows that Bob is unhappy and misses May. Resolving that Bob needs to be independent to be happy, Walt demands they be surgically separated.

Bob refuses, so Walt acts wild and crazy. Drunk, he snatches a woman's purse and spends the night in jail for drunk driving. Although Walt was drinking, Bob has the hangover, as their shared liver is mostly his. Released the following morning, they fight and Bob agrees to the operation.

On the night before the surgery, May shows up, apologizing to Bob for running out. He informs her that they are getting separated; although she does not want them to, he says it is best. At the hospital, May and April wait until the head surgeon informs them that the surgery was successful.

Bob and May, small-town people, move back to Oak Bluffs, but Bob finds the separation from Walt difficult, both practically and emotionally, and has difficulty doing things by himself they used to do together, such as maintain Quikee Burger's three-minute challenge or play hockey. Walt loses his job when Honey and the Beaze is canceled due to low ratings, and cannot find more work. He is also emotionally devastated by Bob's absence. After a brief talk with Cher about what is best for him, he moves back to Oak Bluffs.

One year later, Walt and Bob are running the restaurant together, Bob and May have married and May is pregnant. The twins simulate their former conjoinment with Velcro clothing that attaches them. Walt finds creative fulfillment continuing in local plays, including a musical in which he and Meryl Streep play Bonnie and Clyde.

== Cast ==
- Matt Damon as Bob Tenor
- Greg Kinnear as Walt Tenor
- Eva Mendes as April Mercedes
- Seymour Cassel as Morty O'Reilly
- Wen Yann Shih as May Fong
- Cher as herself
- Jackie Flynn as Howard
- Michael Callan as Fox Prexy
- Ray "Rocket" Valliere as Rocket
- Malcolm G. Chace Jr. as Vineyard Buddie
- Pat Crawford Brown as Mimmy
- Tommy Songin as Tommy
- Terence Bernie Hines as Moe Neary
- Stephen Saux as drive-by heckler
- Danny Murphy as Dicky
- Steve Tyler as Detective Reney
- Dane Cook as Officer Fraioli
- Lin Shaye as Makeup Babe
- Bella Thorne as MV Sideline (uncredited)
- Tracy Ashton as Casting Agent #2
- Jessica Cauffiel as Debbie
- Catherine McCord as Jogger #1
- Rhona Mitra as Bus Stop Beauty
- Peter Dante as Officer J.J. Hill

Cameo appearances

- Griffin Dunne
- Jay Leno
- Cam Neely as MV hockey player
- Ricky Williams as MV football coach
- Ben Carson (as "head surgeon")
- Mary Hart (uncredited)
- Fernanda Lima
- Frankie Muniz (uncredited)
- Meryl Streep
- Luke Wilson
- Jesse Ventura (uncredited)
- Tom Brady (uncredited)
- Lawyer Milloy (uncredited)
- Marvin Blank (uncredited)

== Music ==
The song "Human" recorded by Cher, who appears in the film, and produced by David Kahne was included in the soundtrack (Flynn cover). There was no official release, but in Germany the song was released on a promotional CD of the soundtrack called "Unzertrennlich" and that version clocks 3:49. The original 4:25 version was never released. The song can be heard during the end credits of the film and is played during a scene in a club. This is the first Farrelly Brothers film not to have an official soundtrack.

The song "Moonlight Feels Right" by Starbuck, written and produced by lead singer/keyboardist Bruce Blackman also appears in the film.

Pete Yorn recorded a cover of the Albert Hammond classic "It Never Rains in Southern California" for the film, and like the aforementioned Cher song, remains unreleased. The Kings of Leon songs "California Waiting", "Molly's Chambers" and "Holy Roller Novocaine" all are featured in the film, as well, from the band's first EP, Holy Roller Novacaine.

Greg Kinnear's version of "Summertime" is an almost note-for-note cover of the Billy Stewart version, and was also sampled in Rihanna's song "Cockiness (Love It)". Eight minutes out in the movie, while at a bar, Morten Abel's song "Welcome Home" is played.

The country song played over the closing credits, "The Fear of Being Alone," is sung by George Schappell (credited as Reba), one of a set of conjoined twins who is mentioned in the film.

== Reception ==
=== Critical response ===
Review website Rotten Tomatoes gives the film a score of 62% based on 156 reviews, and an average rating of 6/10, with the consensus: "An unusually sweet and charming comedy by the Farrelly brothers. Fans may miss the distinct lack of bodily fluids though." On Metacritic, the film has a weighted average score of 62 out of 100, based on 37 critics, indicating "generally favorable reviews". Audiences polled by CinemaScore gave the film an average grade of "B−" on an A+ to F scale.

=== Box office ===
Although the film broke even on its $55 million production budget with $65,784,503 worldwide, its box office draw considerably underperformed the Farrelly Brothers' previous hits. It only managed third place in its opening weekend box office (US) despite having the largest theater count of any release that weekend (December 12–14, 2003).
