= The Heartbreak Kid (2007 film) =

2007 film by the Farrelly brothers

- Theatrical release poster
- Directed by: Peter Farrelly; Bobby Farrelly
- Screenplay by: Scot Armstrong; Leslie Dixon; Peter Farrelly; Bobby Farrelly; Kevin Barnett
- Based on: The Heartbreak Kid by Neil Simon; "A Change of Plan" by Bruce Jay Friedman
- Produced by: Ted Field; Bradley Thomas
- Starring: Ben Stiller; Michelle Monaghan; Malin Åkerman; Jerry Stiller; Rob Corddry; Carlos Mencia; Scott Wilson; Danny McBride
- Cinematography: Matthew F. Leonetti
- Edited by: Sam Seig
- Music by: Bill Ryan; Brendan Ryan
- Production companies: DreamWorks Pictures; Davis Entertainment; Conundrum Entertainment; Radar Pictures
- Distributed by: Paramount Pictures
- Release date: October 5, 2007
- Running time: 116 minutes
- Country: United States
- Language: English
- Budget: $60 million
- Box office: $128.5 million

The Heartbreak Kid is a 2007 American romantic dark comedy film directed by the Farrelly brothers (who also helped to write the film alongside Leslie Dixon and Scot Armstrong). It is a remake of the 1972 film of the same name and stars Ben Stiller in the main role as well as Michelle Monaghan, Malin Åkerman, Jerry Stiller, Rob Corddry, Carlos Mencia, Scott Wilson, and Danny McBride.

The film tells the story of a sports shop owner who ends up in a rushed marriage with a woman and meets a true love interest during their honeymoon trip to Mexico.

It was released by Paramount Pictures on October 5, 2007, was a box office success by grossing $128.5 million against a $60 million budget, but received negative reviews from critics.

== Plot ==
Eddie Cantrow, owner of a San Francisco sports shop, is single, a fact over which he is often mocked by his best friend, Mac, and his father, Doc. Eddie attends the wedding of his former fiancée, Jody, where Eddie is directed to sit at the "singles table" which is populated only by children, most of whom accuse Eddie of being a homosexual, while Jody’s family takes blatant jabs at Eddie. A pair of mean-spirited adolescent twins interrogate Eddie on why he is there alone, to which he responds impulsively with an untrue story about being widowed due to a violent ice pick murder.

While on a walk, Eddie sees a purse snatching in progress and tries to intervene, but the thief sprays perfume in his eyes and gets away. The woman whose purse was stolen, Lila, thanks Eddie for his attempt to retrieve it; they exchange names and small talk as she boards a cable car. Lila later appears at Eddie‘s sports shop, gradually admitting she visited his store hoping to see him again.

The two appear to be falling in love while dating over two months, and Lila mentions she is an environmental researcher. Lila soon tells Eddie the company she works for has recently informed her she must move to Rotterdam, a move she states they do not require of married employees. Eddie begins contemplating proposing marriage, which Mac and Doc pressure him into believing is a sound decision, and soon thereafter, Eddie and Lila marry.

Deciding to honeymoon in Los Cabos, Mexico, Eddie and Lila at first appear delighted together, singing songs harmoniously while driving and referring to their long marriage ahead. However, their joy spirals downward when Lila tells Eddie she cannot join in any activities he eagerly suggests they do together, due to Lila’s phobias and personal issues. She continues singing loudly along with all songs during their drive, unaffected by a visibly annoyed, silent Eddie. Lila soon suggests they stop to have sex (for the first time), during which Eddie discovers Lila is adventurous, aggressive, and voraciously narratophilic in bed, all of which Eddie appears confused and discomforted by.

While eating in a restaurant, liquid sprays out of Lila’s nose due to what she states is a deviated septum; later, Lila farts very loudly in their hotel restroom, then informing Eddie this was in fact a queef (vaginal fart). Soon Eddie soon learns more serious facts about Lila, such as she is an unpaid volunteer with the environmental researcher company, that her deviated septum was caused by a history of cocaine abuse, and that the man who stole her purse was her ex-boyfriend to whom she owed money.

On the beach, Lila insists on coating her skin with baby oil instead of sunblock, despite Eddie's warnings of the area’s powerful sun. The following day this choice results in a painful, second-degree sunburn, which she blames solely on Eddie. While the sunburn confines Lila to their hotel room, Eddie meets and quickly connects with Miranda, a beautiful woman from Mississippi on vacation with her family. Eddie spends most of he and Lila’s honeymoon with Miranda and her family, using any reason and opportunity to leave Lila for entire days. Lila is understanding of Eddie’s ongoing absences given Eddie does not mention Miranda, instead, telling intricate, outlandish stories of alleged adventures with clients of his sports store back home. Meanwhile, Miranda's family greatly enjoys Eddie, except for her cousin Martin who regularly insults and thinks very little of him.

Eddie is soon led to believe that Miranda and her family are aware he is married and on his honeymoon, believing they are exceptionally compassionate. However, he does not realize the mean-spirited twins from the wedding table, who are there on vacation as well, have told Miranda and her family the untrue story of Eddie’s wife being murdered with an ice pick.

Eddie attempts to break up with Lila during an outdoor lunch, but Lila misinterprets his statements as a further commitment to the marriage. A very loud mariachi band who has annoyed and smothered Eddie intermittently during the honeymoon arrives and worsens the misunderstanding, as Martin and Miranda’s uncle Buzz walk up to Eddie and Lila’s table. Eddie, under the impression they know he is married to Lila, ultimately blows his own cover.

Miranda soon learns of Eddie’s marriage as well, appearing shocked and heartbroken, then accidentally stumbles off a short cliff into the ocean. Eddie leaps in to save Miranda and is stung by a jellyfish, at which point Lila, who was once stung as well, hopes to neutralize his pain by urinating on Eddie, while he fights unsuccessfully to free himself. Above them still on the cliff are the mariachi band, the mean-spirited twins, and Miranda’s entire family, all watching the spectacle, the latter whom gleefully believe Eddie is receiving what he deserves for not being forthcoming with Miranda. Miranda runs away with an expression of shock, fighting tears, and appears to have developed very sincere feelings for Eddie, and Eddie finally breaks up with Lila, he is crestfallen while reaching out towards Miranda, as she leaves.

After a time lapse, an unkempt, bearded, and somewhat delusional Eddie states Lila had lit his clothes on fire after he broke up with her and even destroyed his passport, stranding him in Mexico. Coerced by "Uncle Tito", the hotel owner and friend of Mac's, Eddie finds hope and leaves for Mississippi without proof of citizenship, to profess his love to Miranda. Border patrol agents repeatedly stop Eddie crossing the U.S. border illegally, but he eventually reaches Oxford, Mississippi.

Arriving at Miranda's family home, Eddie is refused entry and told she is now married. Later that night, Eddie sneaks into Miranda’s room and awakens her, but is unable to say much before her husband awakens and her family enters to remove him from the home. Eddie’s father, Doc, enters the room to remove him from the chaotic scene; Miranda states she has moved on, but Eddie believes she still loves him. As he leaves with Doc, he does not see Miranda look out her window towards him, longingly.

Eighteen months later, no longer married to Lila, Eddie is living in Mexico, looks like his former self, and sells sporting goods on the beach. Miranda arrives and finds him there, states she left her husband, and that she still loves Eddie, who is delighted. As Miranda walks away with the promise to meet for dinner that evening, it is revealed that Eddie is now married a woman named Consuela, and it is implied he will face a similar cycle once again.

In a mid-credits scene, we hear the same aggressive, narratophilic sex Lila demonstrated earlier in the film; she is gradually shown naked in bed, but her partner is not revealed. Shortly thereafter, Lila is shown sleeping, while a donkey sits nearby smoking a cigarette, it becomes clear he is her partner.

== Cast ==
- Ben Stiller as Eddie Cantrow, a sports store owner who marries too soon and goes through turmoil.
- Michelle Monaghan as Miranda, a woman in Mexico who Eddie believes is his true soulmate.
- Malin Åkerman as Lila Cantrow, Eddie's wife who at first is everything Eddie wants, but later turns out to be a total nightmare due to her bad habits.
- Jerry Stiller as Doc Cantrow, Eddie's father who often visits Las Vegas and gives Eddie rather vulgar tips on women.
- Rob Corddry as Mac, Eddie's best friend who is in a struggling marriage himself.
- Carlos Mencia as Uncle Tito, the owner of the hotel in Los Cabos that Eddie and Lila stay in on their honeymoon.
- Scott Wilson as Boo, Miranda's uncle and Martin and Buzz's father.
- Danny McBride as Martin, Miranda's cousin who is suspicious of Eddie and treats him coldly.
- Roy Jenkins as Buzz, Martin's brother who treats Eddie more fairly.
- Ali Hillis as Jodi, Eddie's ex-girlfriend who gets married at the start of the film.
- Amy Sloan as Deborah, Martin's wife.
- Stephanie Courtney as Gayla, Buzz's wife.
- Polly Holliday as Beryll, Boo's wife, Miranda's aunt, and Martin and Buzz's mom.
- Eva Longoria as Consuela Cantrow, a Mexican woman who became Eddie's second wife at the end of the film sometime during the 18-month gap.
- Lauren Bowles as Tammy, Mac's wife who ends up in a dysfunctional marriage with him.
- Luis Accinelli as Manuel, an elderly Mexican who Eddie annoys after being stranded in Mexico.
- Jerry Sherman as Anderson, Miranda's granddad.
- Kayla Kleevage as Patti, the Doc's Vegas Companion, a huge-chested woman who is in the scene with Doc during his phone conversation with Eddie.
- Dean Norris as Jodi's father.

== Production ==
The film was originally announced in 1998 under Interscope Communications, who bought out the remake rights to the film, with Douglas Ellin writing the film. The film sat on the shelf before the remake rights were passed to Radar Pictures after Interscope folded, who subsequently licensed the remake rights to DreamWorks Pictures. Barry Sonnenfeld was first attached to direct in 2004, but he turned down the offer. The Farrelly brothers were subsequently hired in 2005, thus ending the process of development hell after a few false starts, proceeding to production.

== Promotion ==
During the film's preview at the 2007 San Diego Comic-Con, a sex scene from the film was cut due to backlash for the nudity in prior films at the convention such as 300 and Borat.

== Reception ==
=== Box office ===
The film grossed US$14,022,105 (equivalent to $21,772,407 in 2025) in 3,219 theaters in its opening weekend, putting it in second place at the box office in North America. The film eventually grossed a total of $127,766,650 (equivalent to $198,385,867 in 2025) worldwide, which includes $36,787,257 in North America and $90,979,393 in other territories.

=== Critical response ===
The review aggregation website Rotten Tomatoes gives The Heartbreak Kid a score of 29% based on 157 reviews, with an average rating of 4.56/10. The website's critical consensus reads: "Despite some amiable performances, The Heartbreak Kid is neither as daring nor as funny as the Farrelly Brothers' earlier films." On Metacritic, the film had an average score of 46 out of 100, based on 30 reviews, which indicates "mixed or average reviews". Audiences polled by CinemaScore gave the film an average grade of "C-" on an A+ to F scale.

Peter Travers (of Rolling Stone) declared the film the year's Worst Remake on his list of the Worst Movies of 2007. Jonathan Rosenbaum (of The Chicago Reader) dismissed it as "brain-dead".

== Home media ==
The film was released on DVD and HD DVD on December 26, 2007 and then on Blu-ray on December 16, 2008. In September 2008, the film's producer DreamWorks Pictures split from Paramount Pictures and became an independent studio again, with Paramount's parent company Viacom having purchased DreamWorks in February 2006. However, after the split happened, Paramount still retained the rights to all of the live-action films DreamWorks had produced since 1997, including The Heartbreak Kid. It was later made available on Paramount's streaming service Paramount+.
