= The Now (TV series) =

- Genre: Comedy
- Directed by: Peter Farrelly; Bobby Farrelly
- Starring: Dave Franco; O'Shea Jackson Jr.; Daryl Hannah; Jimmy Tatro
- Original language: English
- No. of seasons: 1
- No. of episodes: 14

Production
- Executive producers: Steve Golin; Jeff Okin
- Production company: Anonymous Content

Original release
- Network: The Roku Channel
- Release: December 10, 2021

The Now is an American comedy television series, directed by Peter and Bobby Farrelly. It stars Dave Franco, O'Shea Jackson Jr., Daryl Hannah and Jimmy Tatro. It was originally set to debut in 2020 on Quibi, but it moved to The Roku Channel due to Quibi's shutdown in December 2020. It premiered on The Roku Channel on December 10, 2021.

== Premise ==
A secret from Ed Poole's past has seemingly destroyed his future, the only thing to make his life worth living is to forget the past and live in The Now.

== Cast and characters ==
=== Main ===
- Dave Franco as Ed Poole
- O'Shea Jackson Jr. as Coop
- Daryl Hannah as Maxine Poole
- Jimmy Tatro as Hal

=== Recurring ===
- Alyssa Milano as Sarah
- Lex Scott Davis as Kendra
- Rob Yang as Joon-Ho
- Bill Murray as Dr. Robert Flaherty
- Pete Davidson as Adam

== Episodes ==
No.	Title	Directed by	Written by	Original release date
1	"Call From…Mother"	Bobby Farrelly	Steve Leff and Pete Jones and Peter Farrelly	December 10, 2021
2	"Don't Shush Your Mother"	Peter Farrelly	Steve Leff and Pete Jones and Peter Farrelly	December 10, 2021
3	"Does the Suspense Not Ever Get to You?"	Peter Farrelly	Steve Leff and Pete Jones and Peter Farrelly	December 10, 2021
4	"See You at Ten, Ed-O"	Bobby Farrelly	Steve Leff and Pete Jones and Peter Farrelly	December 10, 2021
5	"Take a Piece of Him"	Bobby Farrelly	Steve Leff and Pete Jones and Peter Farrelly	December 10, 2021
6	"No Past, No Future, Just the Current Moment"	Bobby Farrelly	Steve Leff and Pete Jones and Peter Farrelly	December 10, 2021
7	"Why Does This Ice Stink?"	Bobby Farrelly	Steve Leff and Pete Jones and Peter Farrelly	December 10, 2021
8	"Good News, You're Not Dead"	Bobby Farrelly	Steve Leff and Pete Jones and Peter Farrelly	December 10, 2021
9	"A Little Crazy... But Good Crazy"	Peter Farrelly	Steve Leff and Pete Jones and Peter Farrelly	December 10, 2021
10	"We Gotta Drink Bud"	Bobby Farrelly	Steve Leff and Pete Jones and Peter Farrelly	December 10, 2021
11	"Sharing Is Caring"	Bobby Farrelly	Steve Leff and Pete Jones and Peter Farrelly	December 10, 2021
12	"It Was Just a Nick"	Bobby Farrelly	Steve Leff and Pete Jones and Peter Farrelly	December 10, 2021
13	"Bottomings"	Bobby Farrelly	Steve Leff and Pete Jones and Peter Farrelly	December 10, 2021
14	"Not Now"	Peter Farrelly	Steve Leff and Pete Jones and Peter Farrelly	December 10, 2021

== Production ==
=== Development ===
In July 2019, it was announced Peter Farrelly would direct the series, from a screenplay by Farrelly, Steve Laff and Pete Jones, with Anonymous Content producing the series for Quibi. In October 2019, Bobby Farrelly was announced to co-direct the series.

=== Casting ===
In October 2019, Dave Franco joined the cast of the series. In November 2019, O'Shea Jackson Jr., Daryl Hannah, Jimmy Tatro joined the cast as series regulars, while Alyssa Milano, Lex Scott Davis, Rob Yang, and Bill Murray joined in recurring capacity.

== Release ==
On October 21, 2020, it was announced that Quibi would be shutting down all operations, leaving the series' release in question. On October 29, 2020, it was announced that development of the series would move to The Roku Channel. The series premiered on The Roku Channel on December 10, 2021.
