= There's Something About Mary =

1998 film by Peter Farrelly & Bobby Farrelly

- Theatrical release poster
- Directed by: Peter Farrelly; Bobby Farrelly
- Screenplay by: Ed Decter; John J. Strauss; Peter Farrelly; Bobby Farrelly
- Story by: Ed Decter; John J. Strauss
- Produced by: Michael Steinberg; Bradley Thomas; Charles B. Wessler; Frank Beddor
- Starring: Cameron Diaz; Matt Dillon; Ben Stiller; Lee Evans; Chris Elliott
- Cinematography: Mark Irwin
- Edited by: Christopher Greenbury
- Music by: Jonathan Richman
- Production company: 20th Century Fox
- Distributed by: 20th Century Fox
- Release date: July 15, 1998
- Running time: 119 minutes
- Country: United States
- Language: English
- Budget: $23 million
- Box office: $369.9 million

There's Something About Mary is a 1998 American romantic comedy film directed by the Farrelly brothers, who co-wrote the screenplay with Ed Decter and John J. Strauss. The film features Cameron Diaz as the title character, while Ben Stiller, Matt Dillon, Lee Evans, and Chris Elliott all play characters who are in love with Mary, and vying for her affection.

There's Something About Mary was released theatrically on July 15, 1998, by 20th Century Fox. It received generally positive reviews from critics, who praised its humor and Diaz's performance. The film became a major box office success, grossing over $369 million worldwide against its $23 million budget, becoming the fourth-highest-grossing film of the year. It is placed 27th in the American Film Institute's 100 Years, 100 Laughs: America's Funniest Movies, a list of the 100 funniest movies of the 20th century. In 2000, readers of Total Film magazine voted There's Something About Mary the fourth-greatest comedy film of all time.

Diaz won a New York Film Critics Circle Award for Best Actress, an MTV Movie Award for Best Performance, an American Comedy Award for Best Actress, a Blockbuster Entertainment Award for Best Actress. Her performance additionally was nominated for the Golden Globe Award for Best Actress – Motion Picture Musical or Comedy. The film was also nominated for a Golden Globe Award for Best Motion Picture – Musical or Comedy. It won four out of eight MTV Movie Awards, including Best Movie.

== Plot ==
A singing narrator, Jonathan, introduces a high school student in Cumberland, Rhode Island, Ted Stroehmann, who admires fellow student Mary Jensen from a distance. After Ted stands up to bullies in 1985 to protect her developmentally disabled brother Warren, Mary asks Ted to the prom, as she has broken up with her boyfriend, Woogie. On the night of the prom, Ted gets his scrotum stuck in his zipper. Ted is taken to the hospital after painfully becoming unzipped and misses the prom. After that, Mary moved away, and Ted lost contact.

13 years later, Ted is a writer and thinks about Mary constantly. His best friend, Dom Woganowski, refers Ted to a private investigator, Pat Healy, to track her down. Pat discovers that she is an orthopedic surgeon living in Miami with Warren. After seeing Mary, Pat also becomes fixated on her. He lies to Ted about Mary, to try to disgust him and discourage him from contacting Mary. Pat moves to Miami, where he spies on Mary, and uses the information to charm her into dating him.

Ted finds out that Pat lied about Mary. While driving to Miami to find Mary, he picks up a hitchhiker. The police arrest him for murder after finding a bag with body parts in his car that the hitchhiker left behind. Ted is released after the hitchhiker confesses to being the culprit. Ted arrives in Miami with Dom, who picked him up from jail after seeing the arrest on TV.

After finding Mary in Miami, Ted learns that she has changed her name to Mary Matthews in order to evade a stalker. He asks her to dinner and she accepts. Mary stops dating Pat after her disabled architect friend, Tucker, shows her fabricated police records of Pat's criminal past, including murder. Pat follows Tucker and confronts him, discovering that he can walk, and that he actually is a pizza delivery boy named Norm, who is also in love with Mary. Norm intentionally got his back injured in hopes of becoming Mary's patient, and pretends to still need crutches while continuing to stalk her. Dom advises Ted to masturbate before his dinner date with Mary to calm his nerves. When he answers the door to meet Mary, Ted does not notice that his ejaculate is stuck to his ear. Mary assumes the semen is hair gel and puts it in her bangs. The date goes well and they continue to see each other, while Pat and Norm attempt to sabotage Ted by drugging Mary's neighbor Magda's dog with speed.

Mary dumps Ted after she gets an anonymous letter revealing that Ted hired Pat to find her. Ted confronts Pat, who denies sending the letter. Dom shows up in Mary's apartment and admits he wrote the letter. Dom is revealed to be Mary's ex-boyfriend "Woogie" and the stalker that she changed her identity to evade. Norm and Pat, listening outside, hear Dom struggling to steal Mary's shoes, and intervene. Ted shows up with Brett Favre, another ex-boyfriend of Mary's whom she left based on Norm's lies. Before leaving in tears, Ted calls himself no better than Norm, Pat, or Dom and says that Mary should be with Brett. Mary follows and insists "I'd be happiest with you" before kissing Ted. Magda's boyfriend tries using a sniper rifle to shoot him in the middle of this, being infatuated with Mary as well and admits to only using Magda to get close to her. He misses, but hits the singing narrator, Jonathan.

== Cast ==
- Cameron Diaz as Mary Jensen, an orthopedic surgeon who becomes the obsession of several men. She previously lived in Rhode Island, but was forced to change her surname to "Matthews" and move to Florida to avoid a stalker.
- Matt Dillon as Pat Healy, a private investigator who becomes obsessed with Mary and quits his job to pursue her.
- Ben Stiller as Ted Stroehmann, a magazine writer who is still infatuated with Mary after missing his chance with her as a teenager.
- Lee Evans as Tucker/Norm Phipps, a pizza delivery boy who meets Mary while delivering her a pizza and becomes obsessed with her. He adopts the persona of "Tucker", a British architect, and gets his back injured to become one of Mary's patients and get closer to her. Norm hides how his injury has healed.
- Chris Elliott as Dom "Woogie" Woganowski, Mary's ex-boyfriend who became obsessed with her to the point where she took out a restraining order against him.
- Lin Shaye as Magda, Mary's neighbor and friend.
- Jeffrey Tambor as Sully, Healy's friend and contact in Miami.
- Markie Post as Sheila Jensen, Mary and Warren's mother.
- W. Earl Brown as Warren Jensen, Mary's intellectually disabled brother who is very protective of his ears.
- Keith David as Charlie, Mary and Warren's stepfather.
- Sarah Silverman as Brenda, Mary's sarcastic best friend.
- Khandi Alexander as Joanie, another of Mary's friends.
- Richard Tyson as Detective Krevoy.
- Rob Moran as Detective Stabler.
- Willie Garson as Dr. Bob "Zit Face", Ted's chiropractor and friend from high school.
- Harland Williams as The Hitchhiker, an escaped mental patient and murderer (uncredited).
- Brett Favre as himself, Mary's ex-boyfriend whom she broke up with after Tucker lied to her about him.
- Steve Sweeney as Police Officer.
- Jonathan Richman as Jonathan, the singing narrator and a guitarist who always appears with Tommy.
- Tommy Larkins as Tommy, a drummer who always appears with Jonathan.
- Lenny Clarke as Fireman.
- Richard Jenkins as Psychiatrist (uncredited).

== Production ==
There's Something About Mary was directed by Peter and Bobby Farrelly, who had previously made Dumb and Dumber in 1994 and Kingpin in 1996. According to Bobby, the scene where Ted accidentally gets his scrotum stuck in his pants fly was inspired by a real incident, when their sister was listening to some records with some eighth grade students in the basement of their house: "One of the kids went up [to the bathroom] and he zipped himself up. He was in there for a long time. My dad, who was a doctor, actually had to go in and say, 'Hey, kid. You alright?'" Most of the film was shot in Miami, Florida. The Big Pink Restaurant is where Healy meets with Sully, and the Miami-Dade Cultural Center is the location for the architecture exhibit Mary and Healy attend together. The hair gel scene was filmed at the Cardozo Hotel, while Churchill's Pub was used as a strip club for a scene with Healy. The makeup effects were the handiwork of makeup effects designer Tony Gardner.

Besides Ben Stiller, actors Owen Wilson and Jon Stewart were considered potential candidates for the role of Ted Stroehmann. Bill Murray was considered for the role of Pat Healy, but the Farrelly brothers thought he was too old for it. Vince Vaughn and Cuba Gooding Jr. were also considered for the role of Pat Healy. Because the Farrelly brothers were fans of the New England Patriots, they originally wanted to cast quarterback Drew Bledsoe as Mary's football-playing boyfriend, but he could not do it due to a mosh incident he had in a club. The Farrelly brothers later offered the role to Steve Young, but he turned it down due to the film's coarse nature. Ultimately, the role was given to Brett Favre. Chris Farley was considered for the role of Mary's brother Warren, but his health was in a rapid decline due to his drug addictions and he was forced to turn down the role. He died in December 1997 in the middle of the film's production.

== Release ==
=== Home media ===
There's Something About Mary was released on VHS and DVD on August 3, 1999. Four years later, a new two-disc Collector's Edition DVD release premiered on July 1, 2003. On May 5, 2009, the film was released on Blu-ray.

== Reception ==
=== Box office ===
Upon its release, There's Something About Mary ranked in fourth place behind Armageddon, Lethal Weapon 4 and The Mask of Zorro, collecting $13.7 million during its opening weekend, for a total of $17.8 million from its first five days. During Labor Day weekend, the film reached the number one spot, making $10.9 million and beating Blade. There's Something About Mary was 1998's third-highest-grossing film in North America, as well as the fourth-highest-grossing film of the year globally. The film made $369 million worldwide on a budget of $23 million, with $176 million coming from the U.S. and Canada. It was released in the United Kingdom on September 25, 1998, and topped the country's box office for the next two weekends.

=== Critical response ===
Rotten Tomatoes reported that 84% of 87 critics reviews were positive, with an average rating of 7.2/10. The site's consensus reads: "There's Something About Mary proves that unrelentingly, unabashedly puerile humor doesn't necessarily come at the expense of a film's heart." Metacritic gives the film a weighted average score of 69 out of 100 based on 29 critics, indicating "generally favorable reviews". Audiences polled by CinemaScore gave the film an average grade of "B+" on an A+ to F scale. Roger Ebert gave it three out of four stars, stating, "What a blessed relief is laughter. It flies in the face of manners, values, political correctness, and decorum. It exposes us for what we are, the only animal with a sense of humor." Gene Siskel ranked the film number 9 on his 10 Best films of 1998 (the final "best of" list before his death).

=== Accolades ===
The film is recognized by American Film Institute in these lists:

- 2000: AFI's 100 Years...100 Laughs – #27
- 2002: AFI's 100 Years...100 Passions – Nominated
- 2007: AFI's 100 Years...100 Movies (10th Anniversary Edition) – Nominated
- 2008: AFI's 10 Top 10 – Nominated Romantic Comedy Film

== Soundtrack ==
1. "There's Something About Mary" (Jonathan Richman) – 1:47
2. "How to Survive a Broken Heart" (Ben Lee) – 2:47
3. "Every Day Should Be a Holiday" (The Dandy Warhols) – 4:02
4. "Everything Shines" (The Push Stars) – 2:27
5. "This Is the Day" (Ivy) – 3:33
6. "Is She Really Going Out with Him?" (Joe Jackson) – 3:36
7. "True Love Is Not Nice" (Jonathan Richman) – 2:13
8. "History Repeating" (The Propellerheads feat. Shirley Bassey) – 4:04
9. "If I Could Talk I'd Tell You" (The Lemonheads) – 2:51
10. "Mary's Prayer" (Danny Wilson) – 3:54
11. "Margo's Waltz" (Lloyd Cole) – 4:01
12. "Speed Queen" (Zuba) – 3:44
13. "Let Her Go Into the Darkness" (Jonathan Richman) – 1:19
14. "Build Me Up Buttercup" (The Foundations) – 2:59
