= Peter Farrelly =

American filmmaker (born 1956)

- Farrelly in 2026
- Born: Peter John Farrelly; December 17, 1956 (age 69); Phoenixville, Pennsylvania, U.S.
- Education: Providence College; Columbia University
- Occupations: Filmmaker, novelist
- Years active: 1988–present
- Spouse: Melinda Kocsis (m. 1996)
- Children: 2
- Relatives: Bobby Farrelly (brother)
- Website: www.peterfarrelly.com

Peter John Farrelly (born December 17, 1956) is an American film director, screenwriter, producer and novelist. Along with his brother Bobby, the Farrelly brothers are mostly famous for directing and producing quirky comedy and romantic comedy films such as Dumb and Dumber; Shallow Hal; Me, Myself and Irene; There's Something About Mary; and the 2007 remake of The Heartbreak Kid.

Farrelly solo-directed and co-wrote the comedy-drama Green Book (2018), which won the Audience Award at the Toronto International Film Festival in 2018, the Golden Globe Award for Best Screenplay, and Academy Awards for Best Picture and Best Original Screenplay.

== Early life and education ==
Farrelly was born in Phoenixville, Pennsylvania, to Mariann (née Neary), a nurse practitioner, and Robert Leo Farrelly, a doctor. Three of his grandparents were Irish immigrants, and he also has Polish ancestry. He was raised in Cumberland, Rhode Island. He graduated from Kent School in 1975 and from Providence College where he studied accounting. In 1986 he earned a master's in fine arts from Columbia University.

== Career ==
=== Writer ===
Farrelly decided to pursue writing full-time, which prompted him to quit his sales job and relocate to Cape Cod, Massachusetts, where he got a job as a waiter. On one of the tables he was waiting, Farrelly struck up a conversation with Paul Mariani, a writing professor from UMass Amherst, who encouraged Farrelly to apply to graduate school. Farrelly said he did not think his chances were good, considering he did poorly in college but the professor said not everything is judged by grades. With what would later be Outside Providence, Farrelly submitted the work and was pleasantly surprised that he was accepted. He studied writing for a time at UMass Amherst, but was ultimately dissatisfied with the program, and transferred to Columbia University in New York City, which Farrelly said he found very satisfying. He later became interested in screenwriting, which led him to directing. He made this career decision after many of his screenplays sold but were not produced.

He is a published novelist, with works including Outside Providence (1988) and The Comedy Writer (1998).

=== Producer and director ===
Together with his brother, Bobby Farrelly, he has written, directed, and produced several comedy films including There's Something About Mary, Dumb and Dumber, Kingpin, Shallow Hal, Me, Myself & Irene, Stuck on You, and Fever Pitch. They also conceived the 1992 Seinfeld episode "The Virgin" (Season 4.Episode:10).

In 2006, Farrelly directed the Man Laws series of television commercials for the Miller Lite beer brand, which featured actor Burt Reynolds, American football player Jerome Bettis, climber Aron Ralston, and professional wrestler Triple H.

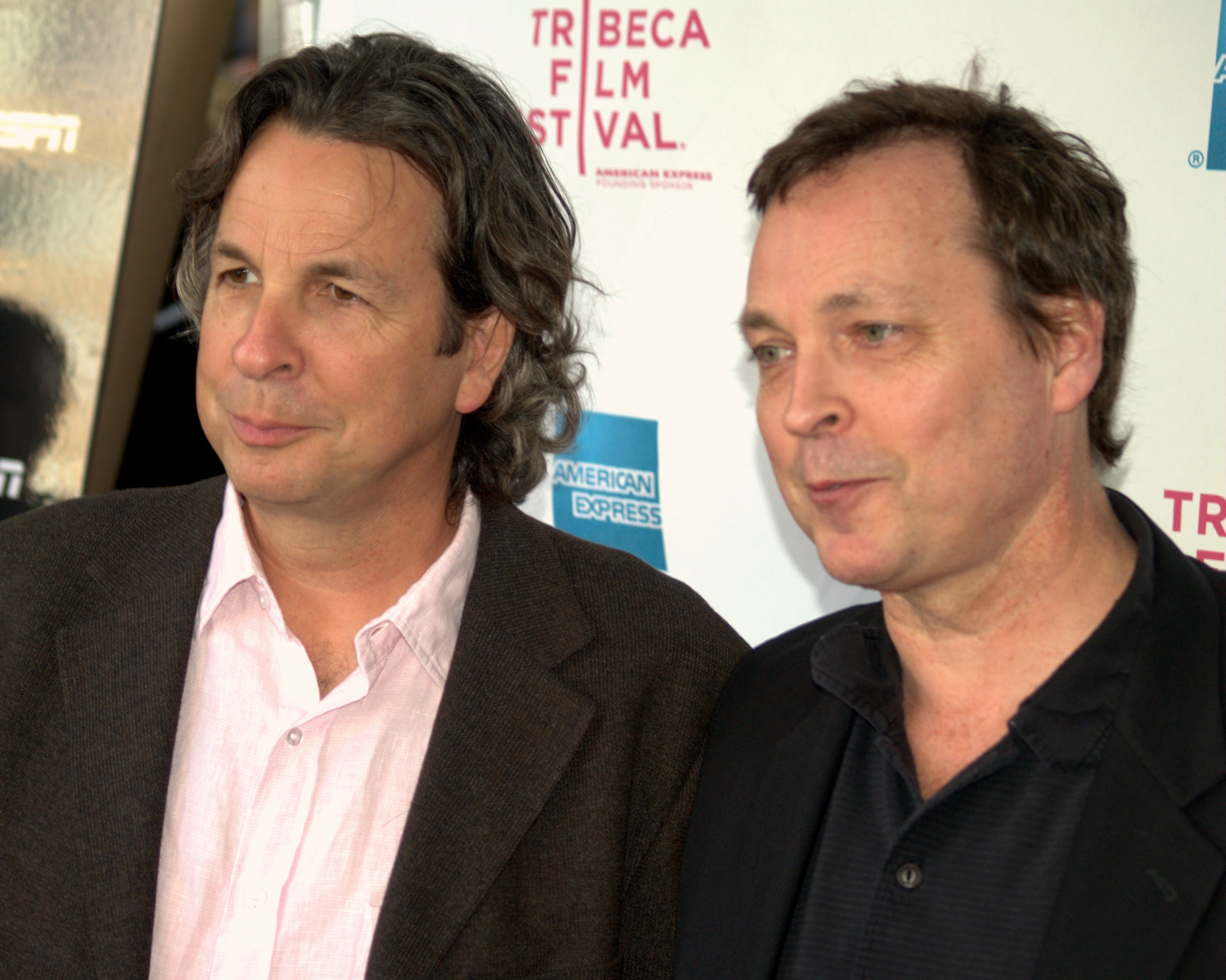
Peter Farrelly (left) and Bobby Farrelly (right) at the 2009 Tribeca Film Festival

Peter worked on a film entitled, Movie 43, which was released in 2013 and produced by the siblings' long-time producer Charles B. Wessler. He produced the anthology film and directed two of its segments.

In 2011, the Farrellys produced and directed Hall Pass.

The brothers produced and directed The Three Stooges in 2012.

In 2012, Peter and his brother announced that the filming of Dumb and Dumber To would begin in 2013. The film was released on November 14, 2014.

In 2016, Audience announced that Loudermilk, a new half-hour scripted comedy co-created by Farrelly and Bobby Mort, would receive a straight-to-series order. In 2018, the show was renewed for season 2, and in 2021 a third season was aired on Amazon Prime Video.

In 2018, Farrelly directed Green Book, which won the Toronto International Film Festival's People Choice Award. At the 91st Academy Awards, he won the Oscars for Best Original Screenplay and Best Picture.

In 2020, Farrelly directed alongside his brother, and co-wrote the Quibi comedy series The Now, starring Bill Murray, Dave Franco, O'Shea Jackson Jr., Daryl Hannah, and Jimmy Tatro.

=== Board member ===
Farrelly is a board member of Direct Sports Network (formerly DeskSite).

== Personal life ==
Farrelly is married to Melinda Kocsis and has a son and a daughter. He has two sisters, and a third sister died in 2017. Peter lives in California, while brother Bobby lives in Massachusetts.

In 1998, Farrelly's colleagues told Newsweek magazine that he and his brother Bobby "liked to use ruses to get people to look at Farrelly's penis" as a joke. Those who had been tricked into seeing Farrelly's genitals include film executive Tom Rothman and actress Cameron Diaz. In 2019 after the story resurfaced, Farrelly stated: "I did this decades ago, and I thought I was being funny, and the truth is I'm embarrassed, and it makes me cringe now. I'm deeply sorry."

== Philanthropy and honors ==
Farrelly is a long-time supporter of disability rights. In 2020, he and his brother Bobby received the Morton E. Ruderman Award for Inclusion of People with Disabilities. Past winners include Michael Phelps and Marlee Matlin. He won the 2015 Lifetime Achievement Award bestowed by Media Access Awards.

== Filmography ==
=== Film ===
==== With Bobby Farrelly ====
Year	Title	Director	Writer	Producer	Notes
1994	Dumb and Dumber	Yes	Yes	No	
1996	Kingpin	Yes	No	No	
1998	There's Something About Mary	Yes	Yes	Yes	
1999	Outside Providence	No	Yes	Yes	
2000	Me, Myself & Irene	Yes	Yes	Yes	
2001	Osmosis Jones	Yes	No	Yes	Live-action scenes
2001	Shallow Hal	Yes	Yes	Yes	
2003	Stuck on You	Yes	Yes	Yes	
2005	Fever Pitch	Yes	No	No	
2005	The Ringer	No	No	Yes	
2007	The Heartbreak Kid	Yes	Yes	No	
2011	Hall Pass	Yes	Yes	Yes	
2012	The Three Stooges	Yes	Yes	Yes	
2014	Dumb and Dumber To	Yes	Yes	Yes	
2015	Dodge Law: Speak No Evil	Yes	No	No	Commercial/ short film
2024	Dear Santa	No	Yes	Yes	

==== Solo works ====
Year	Title	Director	Writer	Producer	Notes
2013	Movie 43	Yes	No	Yes	Segments: "The Pitch", "The Catch", "Truth or Dare"; Golden Raspberry Award for Worst Director; Golden Raspberry Award for Worst Picture
2018	Green Book	Yes	Yes	Yes	Academy Award for Best Picture; Academy Award for Best Original Screenplay; Golden Globe Award for Best Motion Picture – Musical or Comedy; Golden Globe Award for Best Screenplay; Nominated—BAFTA Award for Best Film; Nominated—BAFTA Award for Best Original Screenplay; Nominated—Golden Globe Award for Best Director; Nominated—Razzie Redeemer Award
2022	The Greatest Beer Run Ever	Yes	Yes	No	
2024	Ricky Stanicky	Yes	Yes	No	Nominated—GLAAD Media Award for Outstanding Film – Streaming or TV
2026	Balls Up	Yes	No	No	
2026	I Play Rocky	Yes	No	Yes	

=== Television ===
Year	Title	Director	Writer	Producer	Notes
2003	Blitt Happens	Yes	Yes	No	TV pilot
2008	Unhitched	Yes	No	No	Episode: "Pilot"
2015	Cuckoo	Yes	No	No	TV movie
2017–2021	Loudermilk	Yes	Yes	Yes	3 Seasons
2021	The Now	Yes	Yes	No	TV series
2023	Lucky Hank	Yes	No	Yes	

== Awards and nominations ==
Farrelly won or was nominated for awards for his work in film and television, including winning two Academy Awards and winning two Golden Globe Awards out of five nominations for Green Book in 2019. He also won or was nominated for several film festival awards.
