= Outside Providence (novel) =

Book by Peter Farrelly

- UK paperback edition
- Author: Peter Farrelly
- Language: English
- Genre: Autobiographical novel
- Publisher: Atlantic Monthly Press
- Publication date: April 1988
- Publication place: United States
- Media type: Print (Paperback)
- Pages: 205 pp (paperback edition)
- ISBN: 0-87113-222-2 (paperback edition)
- OCLC: 16646461
- Dewey Decimal: 813/.54 19
- LC Class: PS3556.A7725 O98 1988

Outside Providence (1988) is an English language novel by American writer, producer, and director Peter Farrelly.

== Plot summary ==
Largely an autobiographical tale, the novel revolves around Timothy "Dildo" Dunphy, a ne'er-do-well from the city of Pawtucket, Rhode Island, which borders Providence. After Dunphy falls in with a bad element at home, his father, a widower, exiles him to the fictional Cornwall Academy (a thin guise for Kent School located near Kent, Connecticut).

Over time, Dunphy struggles with issues including class structure, loyalty, first love, and his ongoing issues with his father. Dunphy finds that his fellow prep-school students merely represent a wealthier, more polished class of delinquent than the friends he has left at home.

The novel was Farrelly's fledgling effort, and served as his thesis when he graduated from the creative writing program at Columbia University.

== Film adaptation ==
Farrelly adapted his novel into a screenplay for a film of the same name (1999).
