= Michael Madsen filmography =

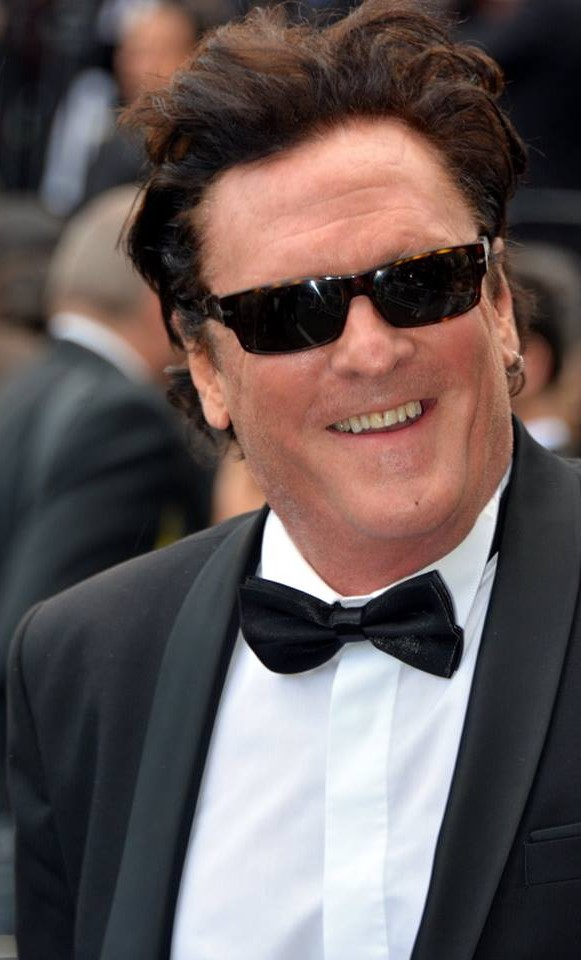
Madsen at the 2018 Cannes Film Festival

American actor Michael Madsen (1957–2025) appeared in over 300 film and television productions beginning in 1982. Madsen made his screen debut in the film Against All Hope (1982), a film made for prison inmates. Next year, he appeared in the commercially successful WarGames, which grossed $125 million worldwide.

According to the review aggregator site Rotten Tomatoes and film industry data website The Numbers, his most critically acclaimed and commercially successful films are Kill Me Again (1989), Thelma & Louise (1991), Reservoir Dogs (1992), The Getaway (1994), Donnie Brasco (1997), Die Another Day (2002), Kill Bill: Volume 2 (2004), Sin City (2005), Scary Movie 4 (2006), The Hateful Eight (2015) and Once Upon a Time in Hollywood (2019).

== Filmography ==
=== Film ===
Year	Title	Role	Notes	Ref.
1982	Against All Hope	Cecil Moe		
1983	WarGames	Lieutenant Steve Phelps		
1984	Racing with the Moon	Frank		
1984	The Natural	Bartholomew "Bump" Bailey		
1987	The Killing Time	Stu		
1988	Iguana	Sebastián		
1988	Shadows in the Storm	Earl		
1989	Blood Red	Enzio		
1989	Kill Me Again	Vince Miller		
1990	The End of Innocence	Earl		
1991	The Doors	Tom Baker		
1991	Thelma & Louise	Jimmy Lennox		
1992	Reservoir Dogs	Vic Vega / Mr. Blonde		
1992	Straight Talk	Steve		
1992	Fatal Instinct	Cliff Burden	Also known as To Kill For	
1992	Inside Edge	Richard Montana		
1993	Trouble Bound	Harry Talbot		
1993	Free Willy	Glen Greenwood		
1993	Money for Nothing	Detective Pat Laurenzi		
1993	A House in the Hills	Mickey		
1994	The Getaway	Rudy Travis		
1994	Blue Tiger	Gun Salesman	Uncredited	
1994	Season of Change	Randy Parker		
1994	Final Combination	Detective Matt Dickson		
1994	Wyatt Earp	Virgil Earp		
1995	Species	Preston "Press" Lennox		
1995	Free Willy 2: The Adventure Home	Glen Greenwood		
1995	Man with a Gun	John Wilbur Hardin		
1996	Almost Blue	Morris Poole		
1996	Mulholland Falls	Detective Eddie Hall		
1996	The Winner	Wolf		
1996	The Last Days of Frankie the Fly	Sal		
1996	Red Line	Mr. Lawrence	Direct-to-video	
1997	Donnie Brasco	Dominick "Sonny Black" Napolitano		
1997	The Maker	Skarney		
1997	The Girl Gets Moe	Donnelly		
1997	Executive Target	Nick James		
1997	Catherine's Grove	Joe Mason		
1998	Rough Draft	Detective Haynes		
1998	Papertrail	Brad Abraham		
1998	The Sender	Dallas Grayson		
1998	Surface to Air	Gunnery Sergeant Zach Massin		
1998	Species II	Preston "Press" Lennox		
1998	Detour	Burl Rogers	Direct-to-video	
1998	Fait Accompli	Frank Barlow		
1999	The Florentine	"Whitey"		
1999	Ballad of the Nightingale	Giovanni		
1999	Flat Out	Gene		
2000	The Stray	Ben		
2000	Luck of the Draw	Zippo		
2000	The Alternate	Agent Jack Briggs		
2000	The Price of Air	Mr. Ball		
2000	The Thief & the Stripper	Jimmie D.	Also known as Strip 'n Run	
2000	Ultimate Target	Uncle	Also known as Ides of March	
2001	Fall	Jeremy Banes		
2001	The Ghost	Dan Olinghouse		
2001	Choke	Will		
2001	Pressure Point	Jed Griffin		
2001	L.A.P.D.: To Protect and to Serve	Lt. Alexander		
2001	42K	Narrator	Voice	
2001	Extreme Honor	Sparks		
2001	Outlaw	Conner		
2002	Tears	Himself	Short film	
2002	Love.com	Russ		
2002	Die Another Day	NSA Director Damian Falco		
2002	The Real Deal	Baker Jacks		
2003	Pauly Shore Is Dead	Himself		
2003	Where's Angelo?	Producer	Short film	
2003	My Boss's Daughter	T.J.		
2003	Kill Bill: Volume 1	Budd		
2003	Vampires Anonymous	Geno		
2004	Blueberry	Wallace Sebastian Blount		
2004	Kill Bill: Volume 2	Budd		
2004	Kill Bill: The Whole Bloody Affair	Budd		
2004	Smatyvay udochki	Boss		
2005	Sin City	Detective Bob		
2005	L.A. Dicks	Steven Miller		
2005	Muzhskoy sezon. Barkhatnaya revolyutsiya	The American		
2005	Chasing Ghosts	Kevin Harrison		
2005	BloodRayne	Vladimir		
2005	The Chronicles of Narnia: The Lion, the Witch and the Wardrobe	Maugrim	Voice	
2006	All In	Seal		
2006	Scary Movie 4	Oliver		
2006	The Last Drop	Colonel J.T. Colt	Direct-to-video	
2006	Hoboken Hollow	J.T. Goldman		
2006	The Covenant	Guillermo List		
2006	UKM: The Ultimate Killing Machine	Major Blevins		
2006	When the Devil Rides Out	Maverick McMillian		
2006	Machine	Ray		
2007	Being Michael Madsen	Himself		
2007	Living & Dying	Agent Lind	Direct-to-video	
2007	Boarding Gate	Miles Rennberg		
2007	Afghan Knights	Cooper		
2007	Strength and Honour	Sean Kelleher		
2007	Tooth and Nail	"Jackal"		
2007	Cosmic Radio	Senator Atwood		
2008	Hell Ride	"The Gent"		
2008	Eyes Front	-	Direct-to-video	
2008	Last Hour	Monk	Direct-to-video	
2008	Vice	Max Walker		
2008	Break	The Associate		
2008	No Bad Days	Lester		
2008	Major Baxter	Major Baxter		
2008	House	"Tin Man" / Officer Lawdale		
2008	Deep Winter	Dean		
2009	You Might as Well Live	Clinton Manitoba		
2009	A Way with Murder	Vic Donovan		
2009	Hired Gun	Dan Moeller		
2009	Road of No Return	J. Marcone		
2009	Shannon's Rainbow	Dave Blair		
2009	Put	Komandir Avianostsa		
2009	Outrage	Farragut		
2009	Green Lantern: First Flight	Kilowog	Voice; direct-to-video	
2009	Serbian Scars	Dreq		
2009	Lost in the Woods	Stuart Bunka		
2009	Chamaco	Willie		
2009	Creepshow Raw: Insomnia	Barry	Short film	
2009	The Bleeding	Father Roy		
2009	Ligeia	George		
2009	Christmas Crash	Joseph Johnson	Direct-to-video	
2009	Clear Lake, WI	The Reverend		
2009	Dead Man Running	Kal McNeil	Direct-to-video	
2010	The Killing Jar	Doe		
2010	Let the Game Begin	Dr. Turner		
2010	The Big I Am	Martell		
2010	Krach	William		
2010	Terror Trap	Carter		
2010	Federal	Sam Gibson		
2010	The Brazen Bull	The Man		
2010	The Portal	Dr. Azirra		
2010	Corruption.Gov	Senator John Mordire		
2010	Now Here	Leblanc		
2010	Six Days in Paradise	Rich McShane		
2011	Joshua Tree	Lou		
2011	The 5th Execution	Rik		
2011	Forest of the Living Dead	Lieutenant Brandon Ross		
2011	The Lion of Judah	Boss	Voice	
2011	A Cold Day in Hell	U.S. Marshal Stallings		
2011	Not Another Not Another Movie	Lester Storm	Direct-to-video	
2011	Amsterdam Heavy	Martin Keele	Direct-to-video	
2011	Dirty Little Trick	Vito		
2011	Loosies	Lieutenant Nick Sullivan		
2011	A Matter of Justice	Leo Ibiza		
2012	Garbage	Himself		
2012	Eldorado	Ted	Direct-to-video	
2012	Refuge from the Storm	Steve Grecco		
2012	Cole Younger & The Black Train	Cole Younger		
2012	Sins Expiation	Don Mancino		
2012	Ace of Spades: Bad Destiny	Sef		
2012	Desperate Endeavors	Ed		
2012	Beyond the Trophy	Cole Lambert		
2012	Terrible Angels	Ben Nolan		
2012	Magic Boys	Terence		
2012	Prince of the City	Ben Carlton		
2013	Madoff: Made Off with America	Agent Kennedy		
2013	Day of Redemption	Lou		
2013	Along the Roadside	Jerry		
2013	Infected	Louis		
2013	The Sorrow	Sheriff Sawyer		
2013	ICE Agent	Carlos Garcia		
2013	Gabrielle	Edward Sheehan		
2013	Nomad: The Beginning	Wolf		
2013	Lionhead	Walter Powell		
2013	Ashley	Bill		
2013	I'm in Love with a Church Girl	Frank Harris		
2013	63lbs	Mr. Johnston	Short film	
2014	Skoryy 'Moskva-Rossiya'	Agent		
2014	The Ninth Cloud	Bob		
2014	Water Wars	Bane		
2014	Death Squad	Lobo		
2014	Turn Around Jake	Russell O'Malley		
2015	Bikini Inception	Himself		
2015	Diamond Cartel	Mike		
2015	A Turn in the Sun	Corozco		
2015	Hope Lost	Manol		
2015	The Just	Mitchell	Short film	
2015	No Deposit	Peter Shay		
2015	Lady Psycho Killer	Doctor Douglass		
2015	Death in the Desert	Ray Easler		
2015	Skin Traffik	The Boss		
2015	Lumberjack Man	Dr. Peter Shirtcliff		
2015	Sacred Blood	Detective Brennan		
2015	Flipped	Casey		
2015	The Hateful Eight	"Grouch" Douglass / Joe Gage		
2016	Vigilante Diaries	Moreau		
2016	The Lost Tree	John Ericson		
2016	Beyond the Game	Robert		
2016	Kidnapped in Romania	Mihai		
2016	Last Man Club	Stearman Pilot		
2016	Unbelievable!!!!!	President Ben Dover		
2016	Magi	Lawrence Irlam		
2016	Back in the Day	Enzo		
2016	Talons	George Fitzgerald		
2016	Devil's Domain	Bill		
2017	Grindhouse Nightmares	-		
2017	Unfallen	General McCallister		
2017	Garlic & Gunpowder	Jason		
2017	Rock, Paper, Scissors	Doyle Dechert		
2017	The Broken Key	Tully De Marco		
2017	A Night in Jail	Captain	Short film	
2018	Killian	Jacob	Short film	
2018	Love Addict	M. Dickinson		
2018	Papa	Ivan		
2018	Dirty Dealing 3D	Dean Belding		
2018	Assassins Revenge	Detective Frank McMillian	Direct-to-video	
2018	Hangover in Death Valley	Ted	Direct-to-video	
2018	CobraGator	Layton		
2018	Dead on Time	Mike McGuirk		
2018	Gang Leader	Gang Leader	Short film	
2018	God's Eye	Max		
2019	Trading Paint	Bob Linsky	Direct-to-video	
2019	The Garden Left Behind	Kevin		
2019	Welcome to Acapulco	Hyde		
2019	Born2Race	Bobby Unser		
2019	Once Upon a Time in Hollywood	Sheriff Hackett		
2019	Primitiva	Narrator	Voice	
2019	Red Handed	Lou		
2019	Arctic Dogs	Duke	Voice	
2020	Angels Fallen	Balthazar		
2020	Conjuring: The Book of the Dead	Jefferson		
2020	2 Graves in the Desert	Vince		
2020	Serpent in the Bottle	Joe		
2020	Shark Season	James		
2020	Dirty Fears	Michael		
2020	Puppy Love	Wesley		
2020	Nishabdham	Richard Dawkins		
2021	Batman: Dying Is Easy	Harvey Bullock	Short film	
2021	Missiya: Prorok	Tyler		
2021	Burial Ground Massacre	Damon		
2021	American Night	Lord Samuel Morgan		
2021	Every Last One of Them	Bill		
2021	Christmas Thieves	Vince		
2021	The American Connection	John Lebaron		
2022	Damon's Revenge	Damon		
2022	Until We Meet Again	Det. Morrison		
2022	Incarnation	Peter		
2022	Numbers	Detective Casey		
2022	Grace	Man	Voice; short film	
2023	Waking Karma	Paul		
2023	The Wraith Within	Sheriff Townsend		
2023	Assault on Hill 400	General Cota		
2023	The Lurking Fear	Officer Hansen		
2023	Outlaw Johnny Black	Dutch		
2024	Prepare to Die	Sheriff Hansen		
2024	Dark Feathers: Dance of the Geisha	Kensei		
2024	Monster Mash	Dott Frankenstein		
2024	Spirit Riser	Narrator	Voice	
2024	South of Hope Street	Benjamin		
2024	Final Wager	Ian		
2024	Arena Wars	Samson		
2024	Max Dagan	Dan Clancy		
2025	Cash Collectors	Michael Turner		
2025	Resurrection Road	Quantrill		
2025	Sinatra! Eternity	Bob Nelson	Posthumous release	
2025	Concessions	Rex Fuel	Posthumous release	
2025	The Things We Carry	Jack	Short film; posthumous release	
2026	Mr. Wonderful	Brian Fenton	Posthumous release	
2026	Blood Behind Us	Reed Philibosian	Posthumous release	
2026	Legend of the White Dragon	Max Reed	Posthumous release	
TBA	Sara Sarita †		Completed; posthumous release	
TBA	A Corpse in Kensington †	Michael	Completed; posthumous release	
TBA	Saturday at the Starlight †	Frank Gunt	Completed; posthumous release	
TBA	The Witching Hour †		Completed; posthumous release	
TBA	Cookbook For Southern Housewives †		Completed; posthumous release	

Key
†	Denotes films that have not yet been released

=== Television ===
Year	Title	Role	Notes	Ref.
1983	St. Elsewhere	Mike O'Connor	2 episodes	
1983	Special Bulletin	Jimmy Lenox	Television film	
1984	Cagney & Lacey	Boyd Evans Strout	Episode: "Heat"	
1984	Miami Vice	Sally Alvarado	Episode: "Give a Little, Take a Little"	
1985	The Hitchhiker	John Hampton	Episode: "Man at the Window"	
1985–1986	Our Family Honor	Augie Danzig	13 episodes	
1986	Crime Story	Johnny Fosse	2 episodes	
1988	War and Remembrance	Lieutenant "Foof" Turhall	Episode: "Part I"	
1989	Almost Grown	Walter Zmuida	Episode: "Take It Slow"	
1989	Tour of Duty	Sergeant Greg Block	Episode: "Sleeping Dogs"	
1989	Jake and the Fatman	Chase	Episode: "Snowfall"	
1989	Quantum Leap	"Blue"	Episode: "Jimmy – October 14, 1964"	
1990	The Outsiders	Mick Jenkins	Episode: "The Beat Goes On"	
1990	Montana	Pierce	Television film	
1991	Gabriel's Fire	Stan Frankel	Episode: "Finger on the Trigger"	
1992	Baby Snatcher	Cal Hudson	Television film	
1993	Beyond the Law	"Blood"	Television film	
1998–1999	Vengeance Unlimited	Mr. Chapel	16 episodes	
1999	Supreme Sanction	Dalton	Television film	
2000	The Inspectors 2: A Shred of Evidence	Joe	Television film	
2000	Sacrifice	Tyler Pierce	Television film	
2000	High Noon	Frank Miller	Television film	
2001	Big Apple	Terry Maddock	8 episodes	
2001–2005	Animal Precinct	Himself / Narrator	58 episodes	
2002	Mad TV	Himself	Episode #8.7	
2002	44 Minutes: The North Hollywood Shoot-Out	Detective Frank McGregor	Television film	
2004	Frankenstein	Detective Jonathan Harker	Television film	
2005	Tilt	Don "The Matador" Everest	9 episodes	
2007	Croc	"Croc" Hawkins	Television film	
2008	Crash and Burn	Vincent Scaillo	Television film	
2010	CSI: Miami	Cooper "Coop" Daly	Episode: "L.A."	
2010	24	Jim Ricker	4 episodes	
2012	Celebrity Big Brother	Himself	Contestant (season 9)	
2012	Bob's Burgers	Kevin Costner	Voice; episode: "Moody Foodie"	
2012	Blue Bloods	Benjamin Walker	Episode: "Family Business"	
2012	Piranhaconda	Professor Lovegrove	Television film	
2012–2013	The Mob Doctor	Russell King	3 episodes	
2013	Golden Boy	Walter Clark Sr.	2 episodes	
2013	Axe Cop	Baby Man	Voice; episode: "No More Bad Guys"	
2013	Paulie	Michael	Television film	
2014	Hawaii Five-0	Roy Parrish	Episode: "Na hala a ka makua"	
2015	Big Time in Hollywood, FL	Harvey Scoles	5 episodes	
2016	The Boonies	Narrator	Voice; 6 episodes	
2016	Real Detective	Ranger Phil Ryan	Episode: "Damage"	
2016	Those Who Can't	Officer Callahan	Episode: "Wet Dreams May Come"	
2016	Powers	Patrick / Supershock	7 episodes	
2017	Real Rob	Michael	Episode: "Authentic Self"	
2017	The Wrong Neighbor	Coach 'Jaws' Jaworski	Television film	
2018	Megalodon	Admiral King	Television film	
2024	DinoGator	Layton	Television film	

=== Music videos ===
Year	Title	Artist	Role	Ref.
2001	"You Rock My World"	Michael Jackson	Thug	
2006	"Kill the Music"	Every Time I Die	Director	
2010	"Obsession"	Sky Ferreira	Himself	
2012	"As Long as You Love Me"	Justin Bieber	Father of Girlfriend	
2014	"Black Widow"	Iggy Azalea and Rita Ora	Boyfriend / Target	
2019	"Dancing on Your Grave"	Nick Le Juge	Priest	

=== Video games ===
Year	Title	Voice role	Notes	Ref.
2001	Grand Theft Auto III	Toni Cipriani		
2003	True Crime: Streets of LA	Don Rafferty		
2004	Driver 3	John Tanner		
2005	Narc	Jack Forzenski		
2006	Reservoir Dogs	Vic Vega / Mr. Blonde		
2006	Yakuza	Futoshi Shimano	English dub	
2012	Dishonored	Daud		
2013	Call of Duty: Black Ops II	Michael 'Finn' O'Leary		
2014	The Walking Dead: Season Two	William Carver		
2017	Dishonored: Death of the Outsider	Daud		
2021	Grand Theft Auto: The Trilogy – The Definitive Edition	Toni Cipriani	Archival recordings; remaster of Grand Theft Auto III only	
2023	Crime Boss: Rockay City	Travis Baker		

=== Documentary ===
Year	Title	Ref.
1998	Steve McQueen: The King of Cool	
2002	Thelma & Louise: The Last Journey	
2004	Sam Peckinpah's West: Legacy of a Hollywood Renegade	
2005	Bullets Over Hollywood	
2019	QT8: The First Eight	
