= Bonded Vault heist =

Robbery in Rhode Island, US

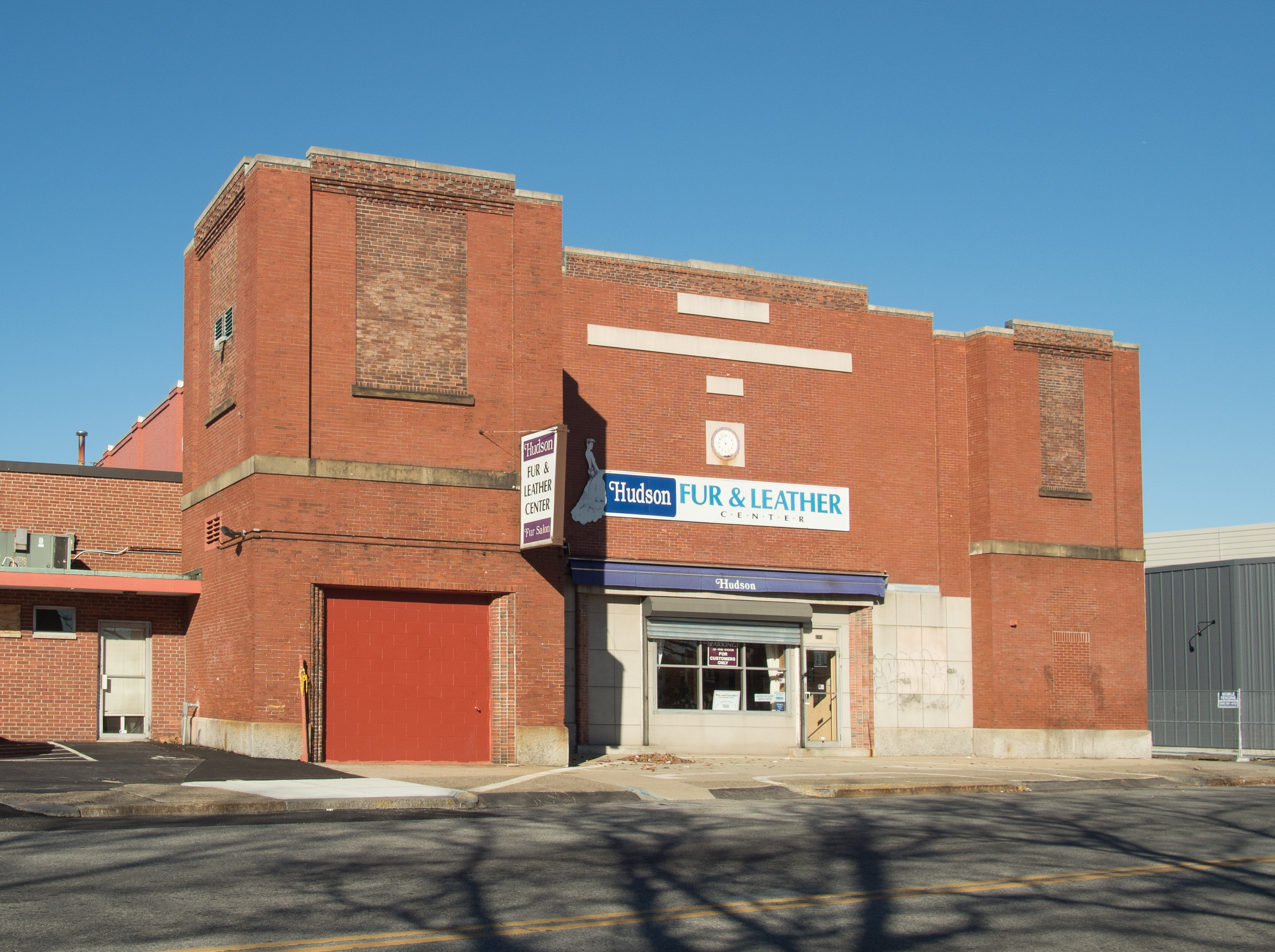
Hudson Fur & Leather Center in 2018, site of the Bonded Vault heist

The Bonded Vault heist was the August 1975 robbery of the Bonded Vault Company, a commercial safe-deposit business occupying a vault inside Hudson Fur Storage in Providence, Rhode Island. It served as the unofficial "bank" used by the Patriarca crime family and associates. The stolen valuables were worth about $30 million (equivalent to $179.5 million in 2025). According to The Providence Journal, it was among the biggest heists in US history and resulted in the longest and costliest criminal trial in Rhode Island history.

== Background ==
Hudson Fur Storage was a commercial storage facility at 101 Cranston Street in the West End neighborhood of Providence, Rhode Island, inside a red brick former church building. A large vault contained 146 large safe-deposit boxes, each of which was reported to be two feet high, two feet wide, and four or five feet deep. The boxes were a separate legal entity from Hudson Fur Storage, called the Bonded Vault Company, and was used by members of the Patriarca crime family and their associates. Due to the reputation of Patriarca and his associates, advanced security systems were not considered necessary.

== Heist ==
On Thursday, August 14, 1975, eight men traveled in a van to Hudson Fur Storage: Robert "The Deuce" Dussault, Charles "Chucky" Flynn, Joe "The Dancer" Danese, Gerald "Gerry" Tillinghast, Ralph Byrnes, Jacob Tarzian, John Ouimette, and Walter Ouimette.

At around 8:00 AM, Dussault entered the business by the front door posing as a client, wearing sunglasses and a suit and carrying a briefcase. He pointed a .38-caliber revolver at business co-owner Samuel Levine and warned employees not to "reach for any buttons or I'll blow your head off". He had Levine gather his employees in an office and put pillowcases over their heads. Six of the other accomplices then entered the business, while one remained outside as a look-out. The thieves tried unsuccessfully to drill into the safe deposit boxes; they eventually succeeded by using a crowbar to pry the doors off their hinges, and proceeded to stuff valuables into duffel bags.

On their way out, the robbers shut the employees in a bathroom. Dussault told them to wait five minutes before leaving. One of the thieves took co-owner Hyman Levine's driver's license, threatening him not to try to identify them. The employees left the bathroom after waiting about five minutes and pushed the business's alarm button to call the police, roughly 90 minutes after the robbery began.

Hudson Fur Storage employee Barbara Oliva, who was previously unaware of the secret bank, said that the men called each other "Harry" to conceal their real names. She reported the thieves yelled, "Oh, Harry, you gotta come! You would not believe what's in here...we’ll never be able to carry it all outta here.'" When the thieves left, she entered the vault and saw it "knee-deep with bars of gold and silver and all kinds of jewels. There were loose coins, a jeweled chalice, cash, guns." The valuables contained in the vault were initially estimated to be about $4 million, an amount that was increased to about $30 million (equivalent to $179,500,000 in 2025) during the course of the investigation.

== Aftermath ==
The thieves went to a hideout at 5 Golf Avenue in East Providence where they divided what they had stolen, each taking $64,000 of the cash and planning to split the proceeds of what they could get for some of the jewelry and other non-cash valuables. Dussault took his share to Las Vegas, where he went on a gambling streak. He met a prostitute named Karyne Sponheim with whom he formed a relationship, and they began traveling the country together. He went through his share of the money relatively quickly, and Sponheim reached the limit of her credit cards. Dussault began calling his associates to ask for additional money from the theft. They began to worry that he would do something rash or talk to the wrong people, so they sent Flynn to Las Vegas to kill him.

Dussault was expecting this, and he confronted Flynn with a shotgun in a Las Vegas parking lot, telling him to get into a car with him. Flynn and Dussault had been close friends growing up in Lowell, Massachusetts, and they began to talk about their past. According to Dussault, both men began to cry and he talked his way out of being killed. Flynn returned to a hotel where Danese was waiting; Danese was angry that the killing did not take place, but they returned to Rhode Island anyway.

In January 1976, Dussault was arrested in Las Vegas after a quarrel with Sponheim, and identified by his fingerprints and tattoos. Law enforcement officers flew from Providence to Nevada to interrogate him. Providence officer Tony Mancuso told Dussault that Flynn had been killed and their associates were planning to kill him next. Mancuso fabricated the story, but Dussault believed him and confessed everything.

== Prosecution ==
A source in the Patriarca crime family gave police the names of most of the people involved soon after the heist. Oliva was able to describe both Dussault and Flynn, who were not wearing masks when they entered, because the pillowcase that had been put over her head was threadbare and transparent. According to former Providence Journal reporter Wayne Worcester, "Oliva really put them away. Nobody else was forthcoming with any kind of information that was very helpful at all. She really was a hero."

Witnesses were closely guarded during the trial, and the courtroom was heavily staffed with armed police. Oliva was a key witness, and she described her protection detail: "They had detectives living with me, in my house, around the house, around the neighborhood. They helped fold baby diapers." Dussault and Danese turned state's evidence and testified against the other six thieves. The trial lasted for four months and was "the lengthiest, most costly trial in state history", according to Rhode Island Public Radio. The courtroom became known for outbursts and other drama; Tillinghast's lawyer Paul J. DiMaio stopped inviting him to the courtroom due to his comments, including antagonizing and threatening the prosecutor.

The jury deliberated for seven hours, then convicted three of the defendants and acquitted the other three. The difference between the guilty and not guilty results came down to alibis. The prosecution was able to break the alibis of John Ouimette, Byrnes, and Flynn, but struggled to disprove the alibis of Tillinghast, Walter Ouimette, and Tarzian. The six men were brought into the courtroom one at a time to hear their respective verdicts. Ralph Byrnes was found guilty on 13 of 14 counts, including robbery, kidnapping, and possession of burglary tools, but innocent of assault with a pistol. Charles Flynn was found guilty on all counts and sentenced to life in prison, though he was released after about 10 years. John Ouimette was found guilty of conspiracy and being an accessory after the fact and was sentenced to 45 years, with 15 years suspended, although his conviction was overturned 10 years into his sentence. Walter Ouimette was charged with conspiracy and being an accessory before the fact but was acquitted on both counts. Gerald Tillinghast and Jacob Tarzian were likewise found not guilty on all counts.

== Later events ==
Dussault, who had turned state's evidence, was put into a Federal witness protection program, but continued to rob banks and businesses while under Federal protection. A coin store robbery went wrong in July 1982, and he was arrested, convicted, and sent to prison in Colorado. He was later sent to a halfway house in North Dakota where he died of a heart attack in 2001.

Law enforcement investigators suspected the involvement of Raymond L. S. Patriarca, leader of the Patriarca crime family, but he was never prosecuted. FBI agents who had been involved in the investigation confirmed his involvement years later, and Dussault stated that the robbery was executed at Patriarca's request. The thieves claimed that they received less than $100,000 each, with the most valuable loot going to Patriarca, including gold, jewelry, and gems. Patriarca was serving a prison sentence and felt that he was not receiving what he was due from his criminal associates, so he decided to steal from them to teach them a lesson. He had the door left open into the vault for the thieves that day, according to Dussault, and he had called for the robbery to be rescheduled at one point because his son Raymond Jr. wanted to take his valuables out of the safe first.

== Legacy ==
The Bonded Vault heist was the biggest theft in Rhode Island history and the largest in the Northeast at the time, and The Providence Journal ranks it as one of the biggest in U.S. history. Tim White (The Last Good Heist, 2016) claims that the heist marked the beginning of the decline of power among organized crime in the area, due to the distrust which it sowed among criminals in the region. Vault, a 2019 film produced by Chad A. Verdi, was based on the Bonded Vault heist.
