= Chad A. Verdi =

American film producer

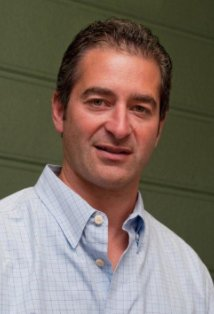
- Born: February 8, 1967 (age 59); Cranston, Rhode Island, U.S.
- Occupations: Film producer, film director

Chad A. Verdi is an American film producer and film director from East Greenwich, Rhode Island.

== Early life ==
Verdi's father owned a meat-packing company and he worked in the day-to-day operations of the family business. He started numerous side businesses, including: toy manufacturers, restaurants, an advertising franchise, a poultry company, a coffee company, and acquired real estate.

By the time he was 25 years old he was a millionaire. He has said his real estate investments support his filmmaking, today.

== Career ==
In 2011, Verdi produced his first film, Inkubus starring Robert Englund, which won Best New England Film at the Rhode Island International Horror Film Festival. He went on to produce Loosies, with Peter Facinelli and Jamie Alexander that same year. The film secured a major distribution deal with IFC.

Verdi has executive produced more than 63 films, including Silence, The 50 Year Argument, and The Irishman directed by Martin Scorsese.

Other notable works include Bleed for This starring Miles Teller and Katey Sagal, Welles Crowther, and Wander starring Tommy Lee Jones and Aaron Eckhart.

Verdi Productions does not operate on a project-to-project basis, but functions like a west coast film studio with established offices, full-time employees and a continuous stream of product. Verdi and his investment partners have invested over $300 million into 61 feature films. His productions use mostly Rhode Island crews.

== Filmography ==
Year	Film	Credit
2011	Inkubus	
2011	Loosies	
2012	Yellow	
2012	Infected	
2013	Self Storage	
2013	Army of the Damned	
2014	The Opposite Sex	
2015	Bad Hurt	Executive producer
2015	War Pigs	
2015	Almost Mercy	
2016	Bleed for This	
2016	Silence	Executive producer
2017	The Elephant and the Butterfly	Executive producer
2019	Vault	
2019	The Irishman	Executive producer
2020	Wander	
2021	Midnight in the Switchgrass	Executive producer
2021	Out of Death	
2021	Burial Ground Massacre	
2021	Survive the Game	
2021	Castle Falls	Executive producer
2021	Fortress	
2022	Fortress: Sniper's Eye	
2022	Damon's Revenge	
2022	Wrong Place	
2022	Savage Salvation	
2024	Chosen Family	
2026	Sleepwalker	
2026	Coyote vs. Acme	Executive Producer

== Acting ==
Year	Film	Role	Notes
2011	Inkubus	Baseball Dad	
2011	Loosies	Father in Train Station	
2016	Bleed for This	Chad	Uncredited
