= The Roaring Game (film) =

- Theatrical release poster
- Directed by: Tom DeNucci
- Written by: Tom DeNucci
- Produced by: Chad A. Verdi; Michelle Verdi; Chad Verdi Jr. Paul Luba; Anthony Gudas
- Starring: Darin Brooks; Fivel Stewart; Eddie Kaye Thomas; William Forsythe; Vanessa Angel; Antwon Tanner; Rob Gronkowski; Justin Chatwin; Mickey Rourke
- Cinematography: Marcus Friedlander
- Edited by: Paul Stamper
- Music by: David Bateman
- Production companies: Hyperborea Films; LaSalle Productions; Verdi Productions
- Distributed by: Brainstorm Media
- Release dates: August 9, 2025 (RIIFF); February 6, 2026 (United States)
- Running time: 95 minutes
- Country: United States
- Language: English

The Roaring Game is a 2025 American sports romantic comedy film written and directed by Tom DeNucci and starring Darin Brooks, Fivel Stewart, Eddie Kaye Thomas, William Forsythe, Vanessa Angel, Antwon Tanner, Rob Gronkowski, Justin Chatwin and Mickey Rourke.

== Cast ==
- Mickey Rourke as The Plow King
- Rob Gronkowski as Nickey
- William Forsythe as Coach Rhodes
- Vanessa Angel as Katrina Cole
- Darin Brooks as Rickey Rhodes
- Fivel Stewart as Kelly
- Eddie Kaye Thomas as Bobby Rhodes
- Justin Chatwin as Troy Samson
- Antwon Tanner as Hank
- John Fiore as Uncle Jerry
- Paul Johansson as Dean Ted Nelson
- Eric Lutes as Harold Rose
- Brett Azar as Nikita
- Jonathan Stoddard as Vince
- Rob Goon as Fridge

== Production ==
In October 2024, it was announced that filming on the film wrapped along with a number of cast members, including Rourke, Rob Gronkowski, William Forsythe and Vanessa Angel.

== Release ==
The Roaring Game premiered at the Rhode Island International Film Festival on August 9, 2025. In October 2025, Brainstorm Media picked up the film for distribution in the United States. The film was released in the United States on February 6, 2026.
