= Inkubus =

- Directed by: Glenn Ciano
- Written by: Carl Dupré; Glenn Ciano
- Produced by: Michael Corrente; Chad Verdi; John Santilli; Glenn Ciano
- Starring: Robert Englund; William Forsythe; Jonathan Silverman; Joey Fatone; Michelle Ray Smith; Mike Cerrone; Dyan Kane
- Cinematography: Ben DeLuca
- Edited by: Frank Raposo
- Release dates: October 14, 2011 (Rock and Shock)
- Running time: 80 minutes
- Country: United States
- Language: English

Inkubus is a 2011 horror film produced by the Woodhaven Production Company, written by Carl Dupré, and directed by Glenn Ciano. The film stars Robert Englund, William Forsythe, Joey Fatone, Jonathan Silverman, Dyan Kane, Mike Cerrone, Tom Denucci, and Michelle Ray Smith.

== Plot ==
Inkubus tells the story of a skeleton crew working the final shift at a soon-to-be demolished police station in Wood Haven, Rhode Island. The night takes a gruesome turn when the demon, Inkubus (Robert Englund), calmly walks into the station holding the severed head of a murdered girl. Inkubus toys with the crew, allowing himself to be restrained, and begins to proudly confess to his litany of crimes, some dating back to the Middle Ages. Inkubus has a score to settle with the one detective (William Forsythe) that almost put him away some thirteen years ago. To their dismay, the cops quickly become pawns in Inkubus’ brutal crowning achievement of murder, gore, and mayhem.

== Cast ==
- Robert Englund as Inkubus
- William Forsythe as Detective Diamante
- Jonathan Silverman as Tech
- Joey Fatone as Detective Caretti
- Michelle Ray Smith as Cole
- Mike Cerrone as Mudge
- Tom DeNucci as Pax
- Kevin DeCristofano as Miles "The Headless Horseman" Coogan
- Dyan Kane as Dr. Emily Winstrom
- Tom Paolino as Meat

== Production ==
Inkubus was filmed in Cranston, Rhode Island. It was produced by The Woodhaven Production Company, a fully funded film production company that started by established Rhode Island businessman and entrepreneur Chad A. Verdi. The original screenplay was written by Carl Dupre and developed with Glenn Ciano, writer of Homie Spumoni, who also directed and produced the feature.

Ciano cited 1980s horror films as an influence.

== Release ==
Inkubus had a limited theatrical release, on October 31, 2011. It was released on DVD and video on demand on February 21, 2012 through Screen Media Films.

== Reception ==
Rotten Tomatoes does not have enough reviews for any consensus.

In a positive review, Scott Hallam of Dread Central called Inkubus imperfect but entertaining, rating it 3.5/5. Bloody Disgusting was less enthusiastic, rating it a 2/5.
