= Mike Cerrone =

American actor

- Born: June 9, 1957 (age 69); Rhode Island, U.S.
- Occupations: Film actor, screenwriter, director

Mike Cerrone (born June 9, 1957) is an American actor and screenwriter from Rhode Island. He has frequently worked with the Farrelly brothers.

== Filmography ==
- Outside Providence – actor
- Me, Myself and Irene – co-writer, actor; Officer Stubie (with Peter Farrelly and Bobby Farrelly)
- Homie Spumoni - director, co-writer (with Steve Cerrone and Glenn Ciano
- The Three Stooges co-writer (with Bobby Farrelly and Peter Farrelly)
- Dumb and Dumber To - co-writer (with Sean Anders, John Morris, Peter Farrelly, Bobby Farrelly, and Bennet Yellin)
