= Marianne Leone Cooper =

American actress

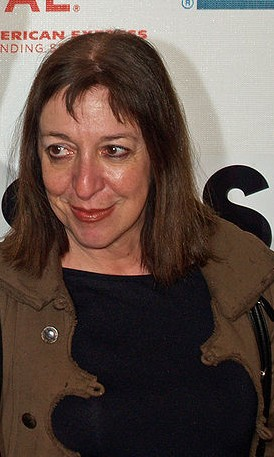
- Cooper at the 2007 Tribeca Festival
- Born: Marianne Leone; January 2, 1952 (age 74); Nonantum, Massachusetts, U.S.
- Other name: Maryanne Leone
- Occupations: Actress, writer
- Years active: 1985–present
- Spouse: Chris Cooper (m. 1983)
- Children: 1

Marianne Leone Cooper (born January 2, 1952) is an American film and television actress, screenwriter and essayist. She is best known for playing Christopher Moltisanti's mother on The Sopranos.

== Early life ==
Cooper was born Marianne Leone in Nonantum, Massachusetts, to Italian immigrants. During World War II, her mother and aunt worked in a factory in Nonantum. Cooper attended Catholic school for twelve years.

== Career ==
Cooper began her career in acting with the The Thin Blue Line in 1988. In the following years, she acted in True Love (1989), Goodfellas (1990), Household Saints (1993), and The Three Stooges (2012). She has also acted in a small number of television series, including Kate & Allie (1985) and Brotherhood (2007). Her longest-running recurring role was playing Christopher Moltisanti's mother in nine episodes of The Sopranos from 2002 to 2007.

She wrote the screenplay for Hurricane Mary, a true life story of a mother's struggles to have her disabled twin daughters integrated into the public school system. Chris Cooper, Dakota Fanning, Elle Fanning, William H. Macy, and Meryl Streep were cast in the project.

In 2010, Leone's essays appeared in The Boston Globe. Her essay "Knitting: Epic Fail" appears in the anthology Knitting Yarns: Writers on Knitting, published by W. W. Norton & Company in 2013.

In 2024, Cooper served as an executive producer of the documentary My Own Normal about Alexander Freeman, a filmmaker from Newton, Massachusetts who has cerebral palsy. The film follows his journey of becoming a partner and father and confronting the pain of his parent's reaction. The documentary world premiered at the Independent Film Festival Boston.

== Personal life ==
Cooper married actor Chris Cooper in 1983. In 1987, their only son, Jesse Lanier Cooper, was born. Three months premature, Jesse developed a cerebral hemorrhage and cerebral palsy. After searching for the best schools for children with special needs, Cooper and Leone moved to Kingston, Massachusetts, where they became strong advocates for disabled children. On January 3, 2005, Jesse Cooper died from SUDEP. A memorial fund was set up in his name, the Jesse Cooper Foundation. Leone's memoir, Knowing Jesse: A Mother's Story of Grief, Grace, and Everyday Bliss, was published in September 2010 by Simon & Schuster.

She and Chris Cooper adopt and live with rescue dogs.

== Bibliography ==
- Ma Speaks Up: And a First-Generation Daughter Talks Back, Beacon Press, 2017, ISBN 978-0807060049
- Knowing Jesse: A Mother's Story of Grief, Grace, and Everyday Bliss, Simon & Schuster, 2010, ISBN 978-1439183922

== Partial filmography ==
- True Love (1989) - Carmella
- Goodfellas (1990) - Tuddy's Wife
- Mortal Thoughts (1991) - Aunt Rita
- City of Hope (1991) - Joann
- Household Saints (1993) - Sr. Cupertino
- The 24 Hour Woman (1999) - Cable Executive #1
- Hair Under the Roses (2000) - Fille du bal 1
- Loosies (2011) - Rita Corelli
- The Three Stooges (2012) - Sister Ricarda
- Joy (2015) - Sharon
- My Own Normal (2024) - Documentary, Executive Producer
