= Wayne Worcester =

American journalist and author (1947–2026)

Professor Wayne Worcester
- Born: Wayne Alan Worcester; September 5, 1947; Keene, New Hampshire, U.S.
- Died: July 1, 2026 (aged 78); Hartford, Connecticut, U.S.
- Education: University of New Hampshire, Columbia University
- Occupations: Professor of journalism, journalist and magazine writer
- Employer: University of Connecticut
- Known for: Teaching, Sherlock Holmes novels, journalism
- Notable work: The Monster of St. Marylebone, Sweet Rewards

Wayne Alan Worcester (September 5, 1947 – July 1, 2026) was an American journalist, author and academic. He graduated from the University of New Hampshire and Columbia University Graduate School of Journalism and worked as a reporter and magazine writer. Worcester became a journalism professor at the University of Connecticut in 1987. He is the author of a series of Sherlock Holmes novels.

== Professional life ==
Worcester was a news reporter for The Providence Journal in Providence, Rhode Island for over a decade before he joined the faculty at the University of Connecticut as a journalism professor in 1987. He reported on the Bonded Vault heist, a 1975 theft of more than $30 million worth of valuables from safe deposit boxes mostly belonging to the Patriarca crime family. He began working as a journalism professor in 1987 at the University of Connecticut in Storrs, Connecticut.

== Personal life and death ==
Worcester was diagnosed with narcolepsy and was featured in national media coverage of the illness, including NBC News. He died in Hartford, Connecticut, on July 1, 2026, at the age of 78.

== Bibliography ==
=== Sherlock Holmes novels ===
- The Monster of St. Marylebone (1999) ISBN 0-451-19871-9
- The Jewel of Covent Garden (2000) ISBN 0-451-20195-7

== Short stories ==
- "Sweet Rewards" (included in the mystery anthology And the Dying Is Easy (2001) ISBN 0-451-20329-1)

=== Non-fiction ===
- The Essential Researcher (1993) ISBN 0-06-271514-3
