= West End, Providence, Rhode Island =

Neighborhood in the southwestern part of Providence, Rhode Island

Coordinates: 41.8102°N 71.4353°W

West End
- Neighborhood of Providence
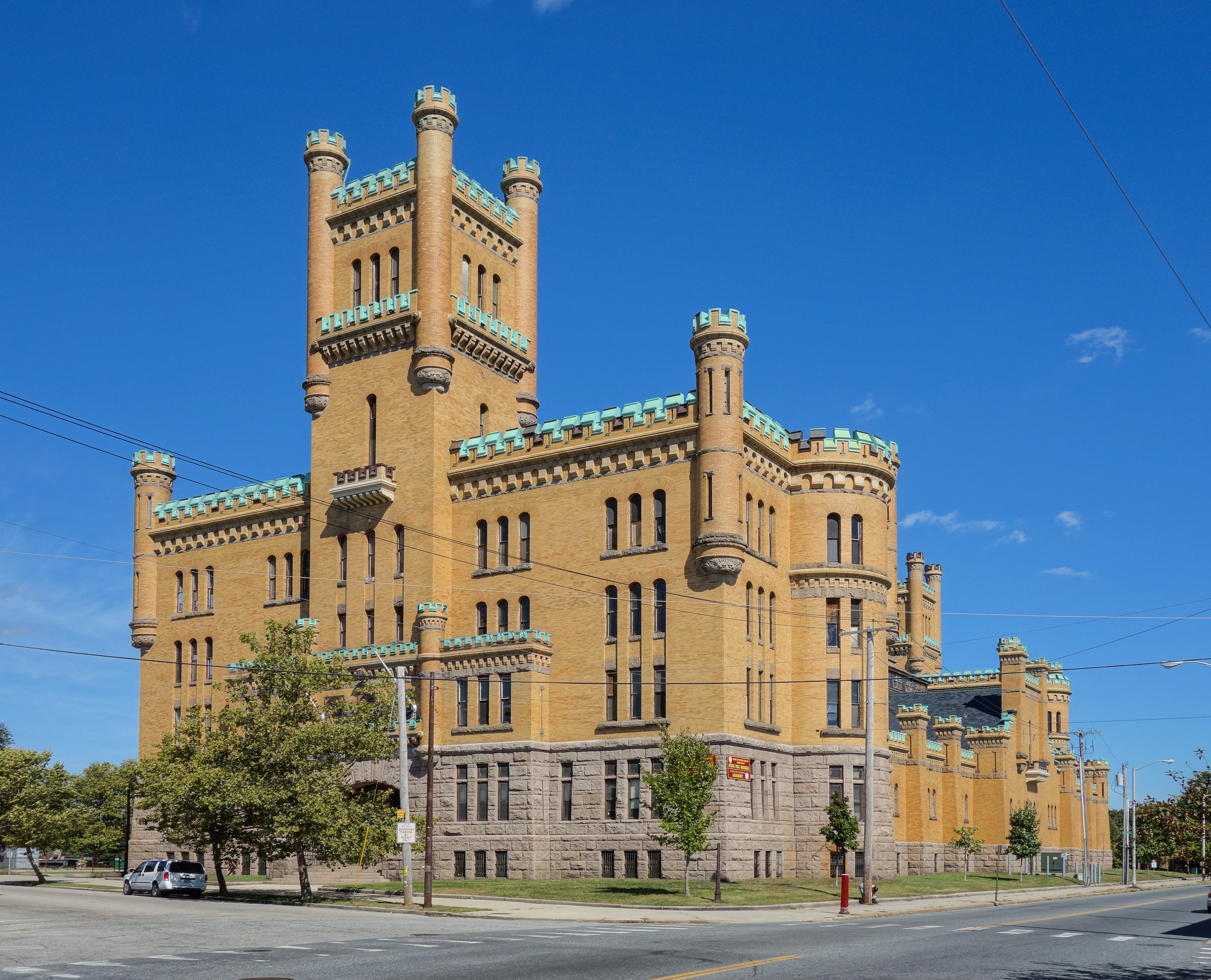
- The Cranston Street Armory

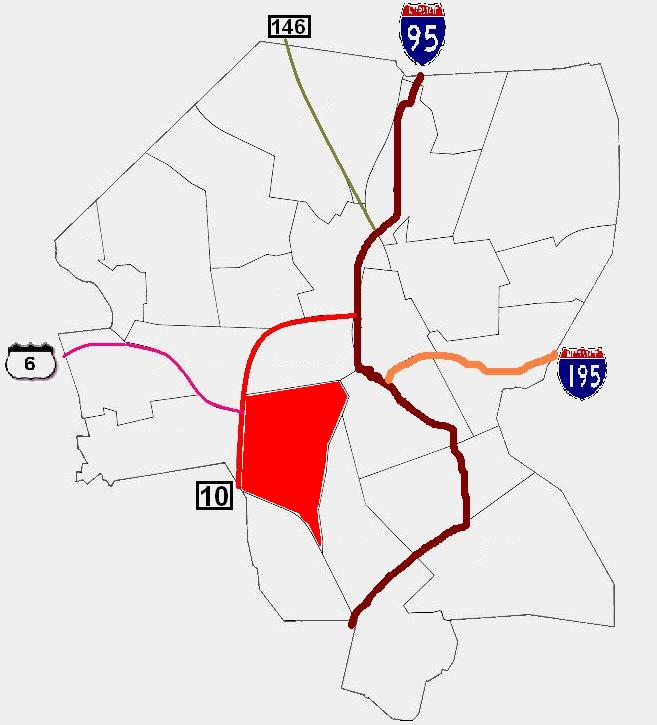
- Location of the West End within Providence
- Country: United States
- State: Rhode Island
- City: Providence

The West End is a neighborhood in the southwestern part of Providence, Rhode Island in the region often referred to as the South Side. Its boundaries are delineated by Westminster Street to the north, Huntington Avenue to the south, Elmwood Avenue to the east and the railroad tracks with Route 10 to the west. Cranston Street runs through the center of West End, past the Cranston Street Armory which has given the neighborhood the alternative name of the "Armory District."

== History ==
The first settlement of the area took place shortly after King Philip's War in the form of farming. In 1739, Obidiah Brown built the Hoyle Tavern at the intersections of Westminster and Cranston Streets, near present-day Classical High School. Early settlers built houses nearby to the tavern. In the 19th century, the area developed industrially and residentially with several factories built near the now-filled Long Pond. Residential construction followed after a horse-drawn coach started serving the area in 1855 and a streetcar in 1865.

North of Cranston Street developed a white middle-class neighborhood of one and two family houses, while south of it, double and triple decker houses were built to accommodate increasing numbers of Irish, French Canadians, and African-Americans.

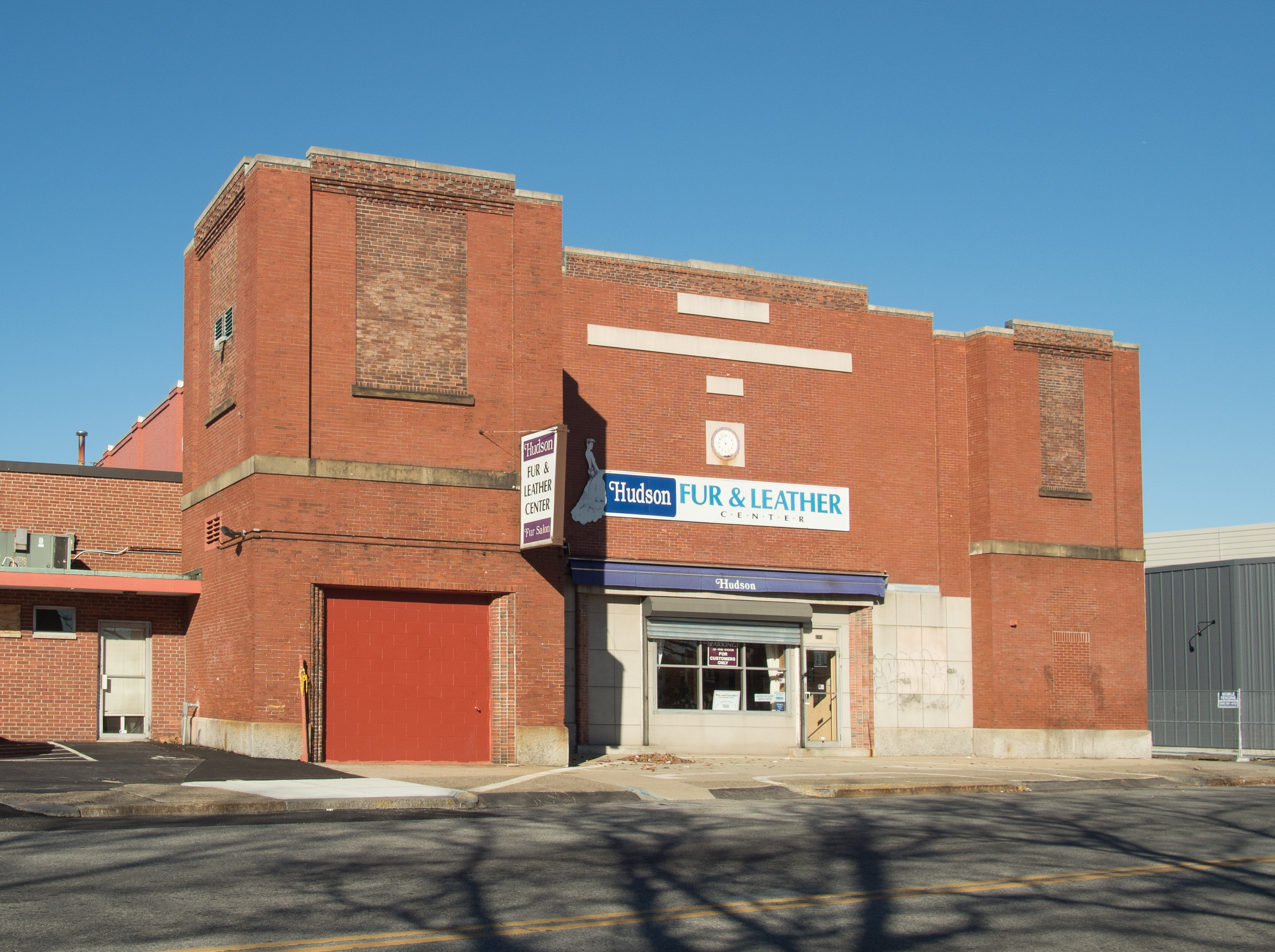
Hudson Fur & Leather Center, site of the 1975 Bonded Vault heist

Following the urban decline of the 1930s, the West End has become a slowly decaying inner city neighborhood as middle class residents left. The adjacent Huntington Industrial Park in Olneyville had kept industry nearby, but when Gorham Manufacturing Company left the area Olneyville lost importance as a freight rail hub. Further, Route 10 was constructed, physically separating the West End from the rest of the city.

== Revitalization ==
In recent years, new residents have worked to improve and renovate the area's housing supply, particularly the more historic houses, including turning older houses into affordable rentals. For example, the Mechanical Fabric Company between Sprague and Cromwell Streets was renovated and rebranded in 2019 as "Rooms & Works," a hybrid of residences and work spaces, including apartments, a commercial doughnut kitchen, and a brewery and bar.

In 2019, the City Plan Commission granted approval for redevelopment of the former Citizens Bank Building and five adjacent lots at Canonicus Square, at the intersection of Cranston and Westminster Streets, an area considered to be the gateway to the West End.

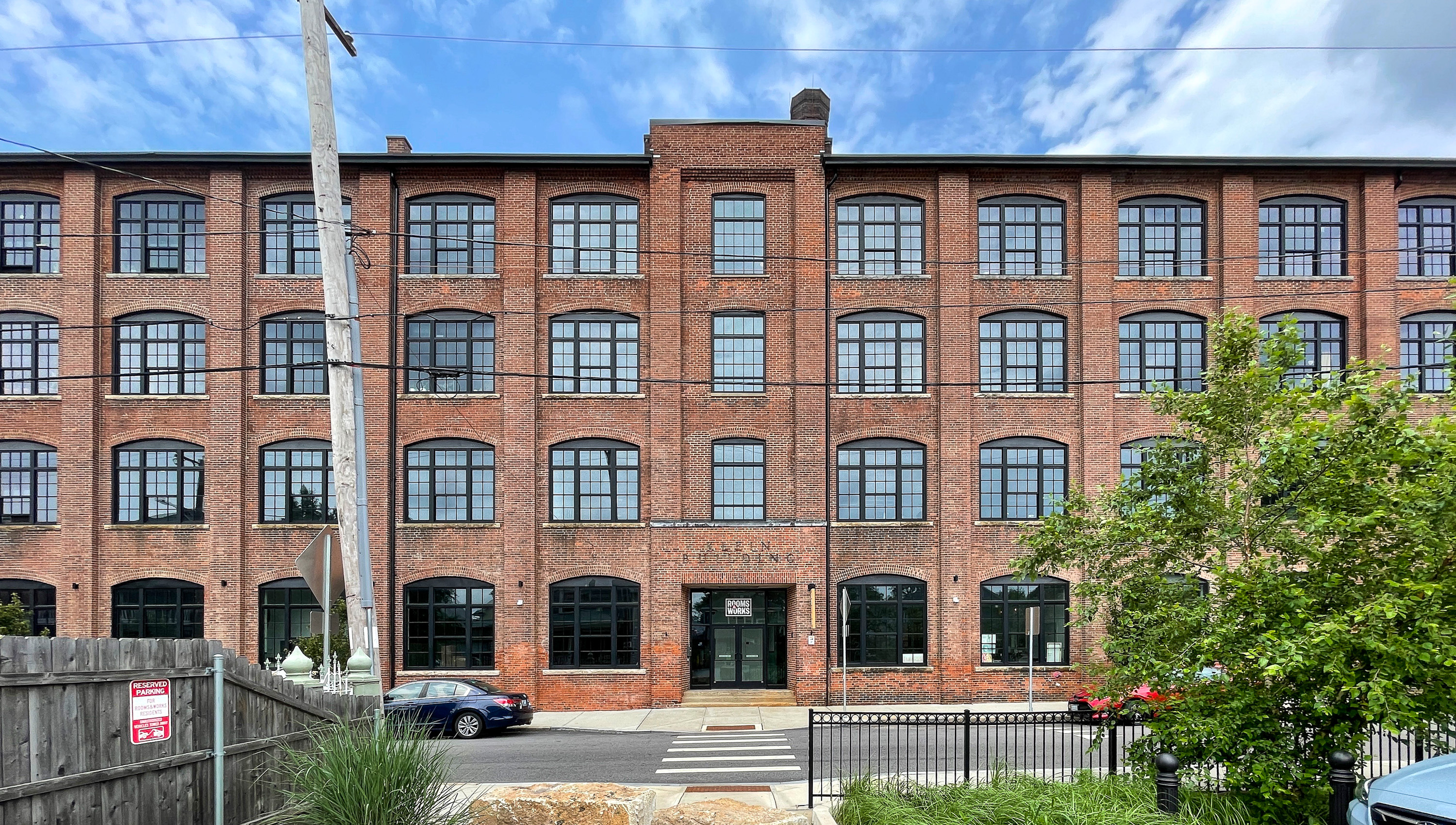
The Mechanical Fabric Company complex, now residences and work spaces

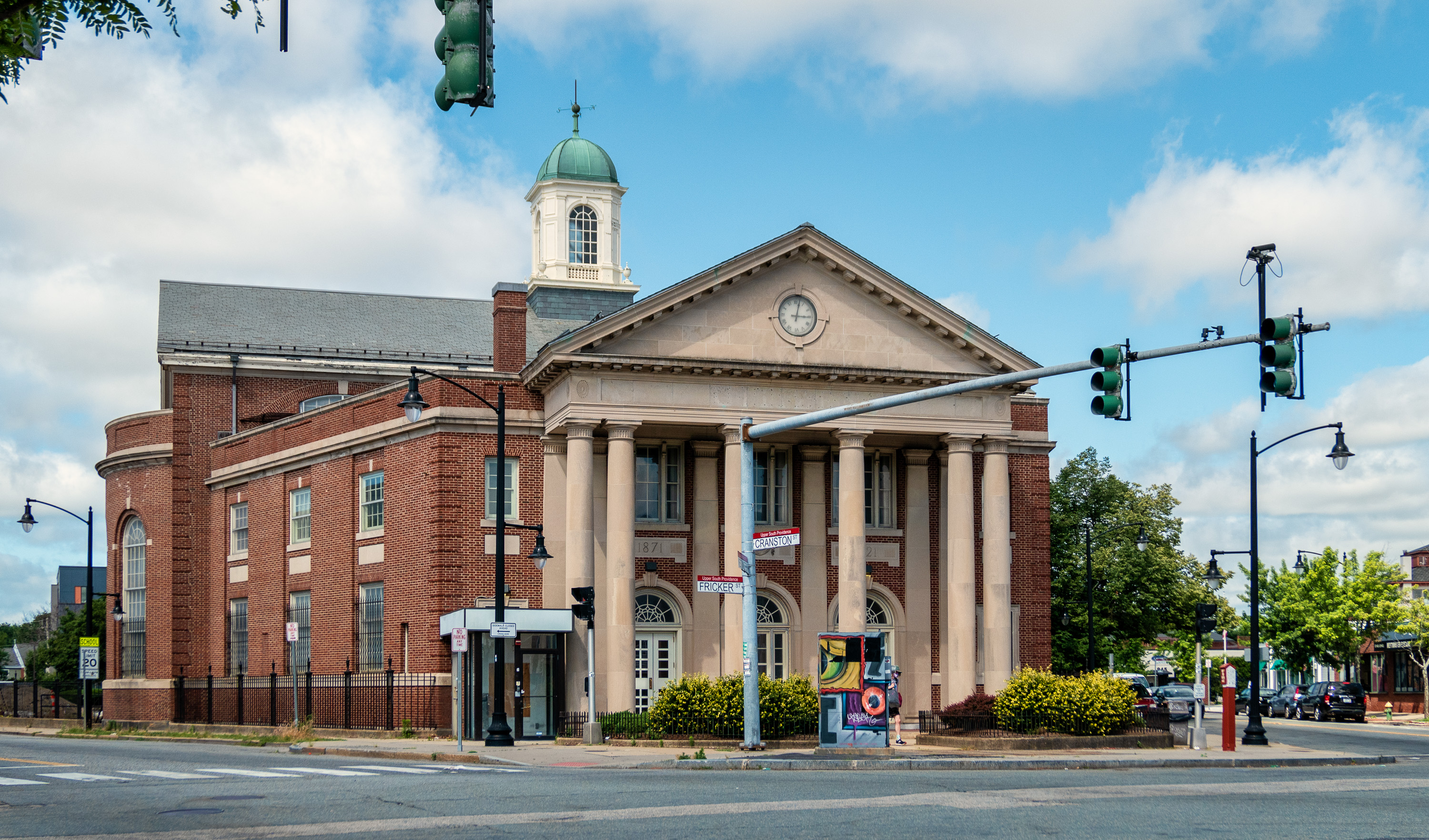
The Former Citizens Savings Bank building, slated for redevelopment

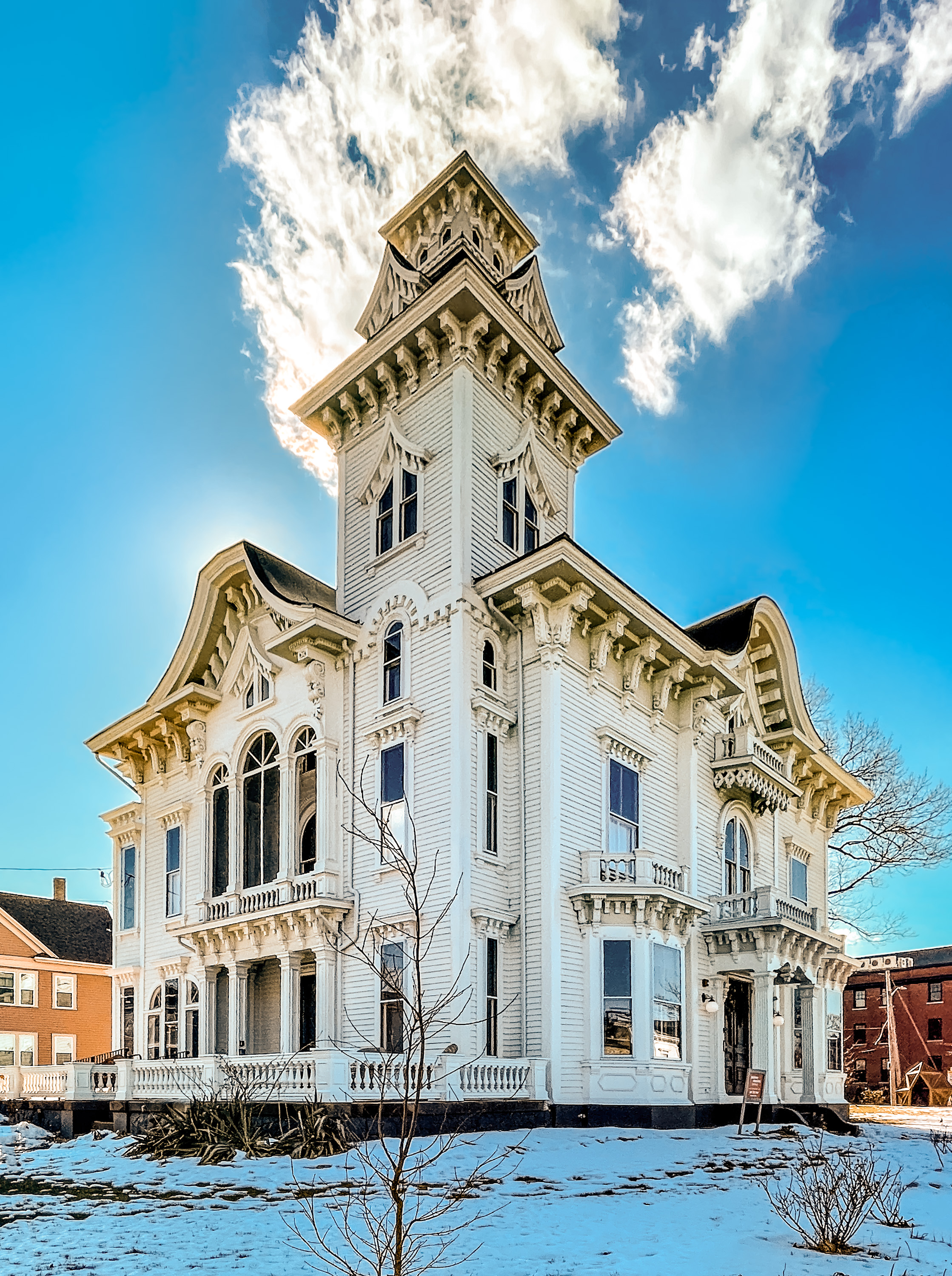
The restored Wedding Cake House, owned by Dirt Palace art collective

== Demographics ==
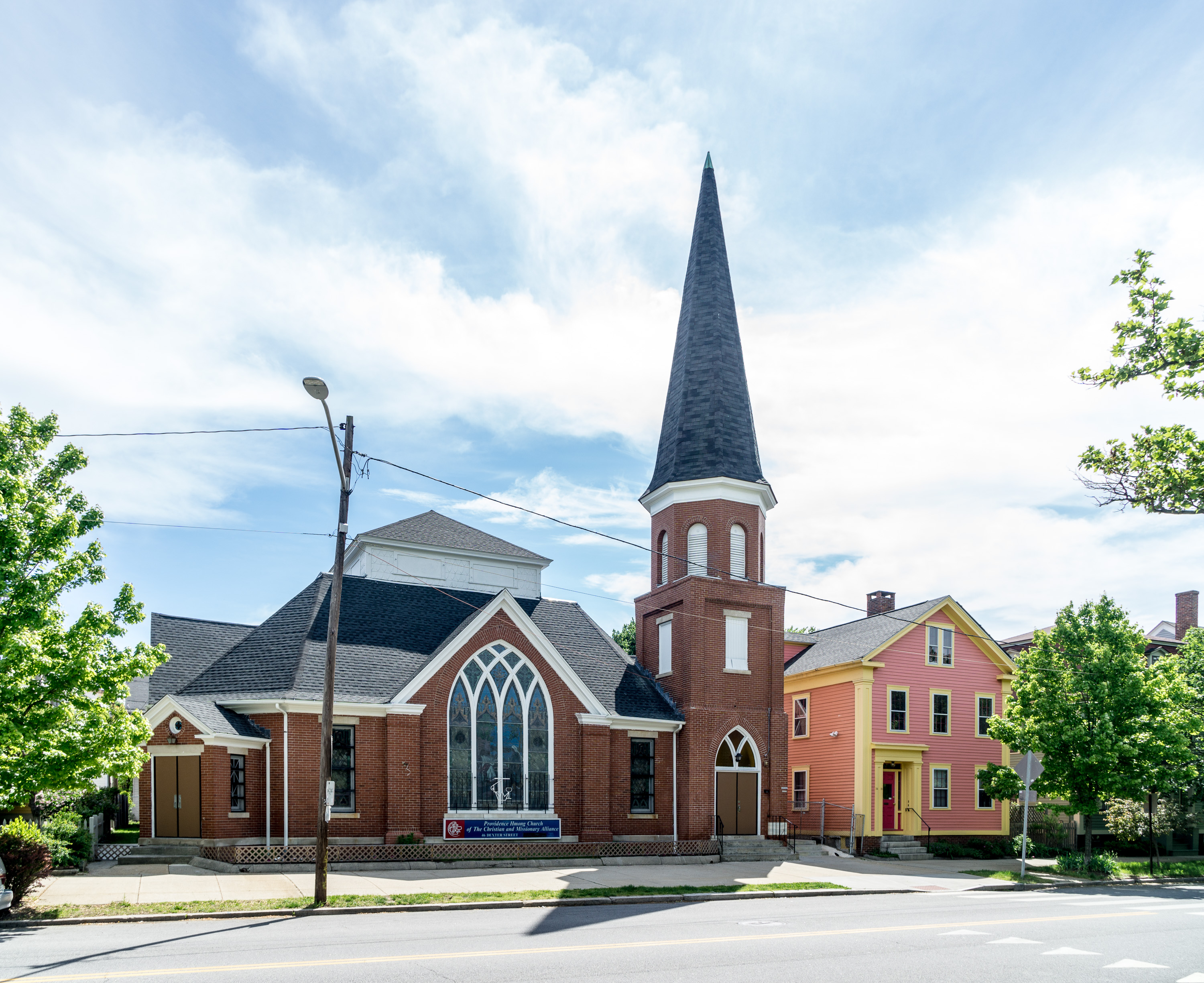
Hmong Church and houses along Dexter Street

As of the 1990 census, one in three residents of the West End was Hispanic, about 30 percent were Black, and 14 percent were Asian, making the West End one of the city's most diverse neighborhoods. About one in three families was living below the poverty line and 44% of residents over 25 had completed high school.

According to the Providence Plan, a local nonprofit aimed at improving city life, half of all West End residents are Hispanic while 19% are African-American, 14% white, 13% Asian, and 1.6% Native American. 68% of children under the age of six speak a language other than English as their primary language.

The median family income is $23,346, below the citywide average of $32,058. 36.6% of families live below the poverty line while one in ten families receives some form of public assistance.

Nearly one in four children under the age of six have been exposed to high levels of lead.

== Schools ==
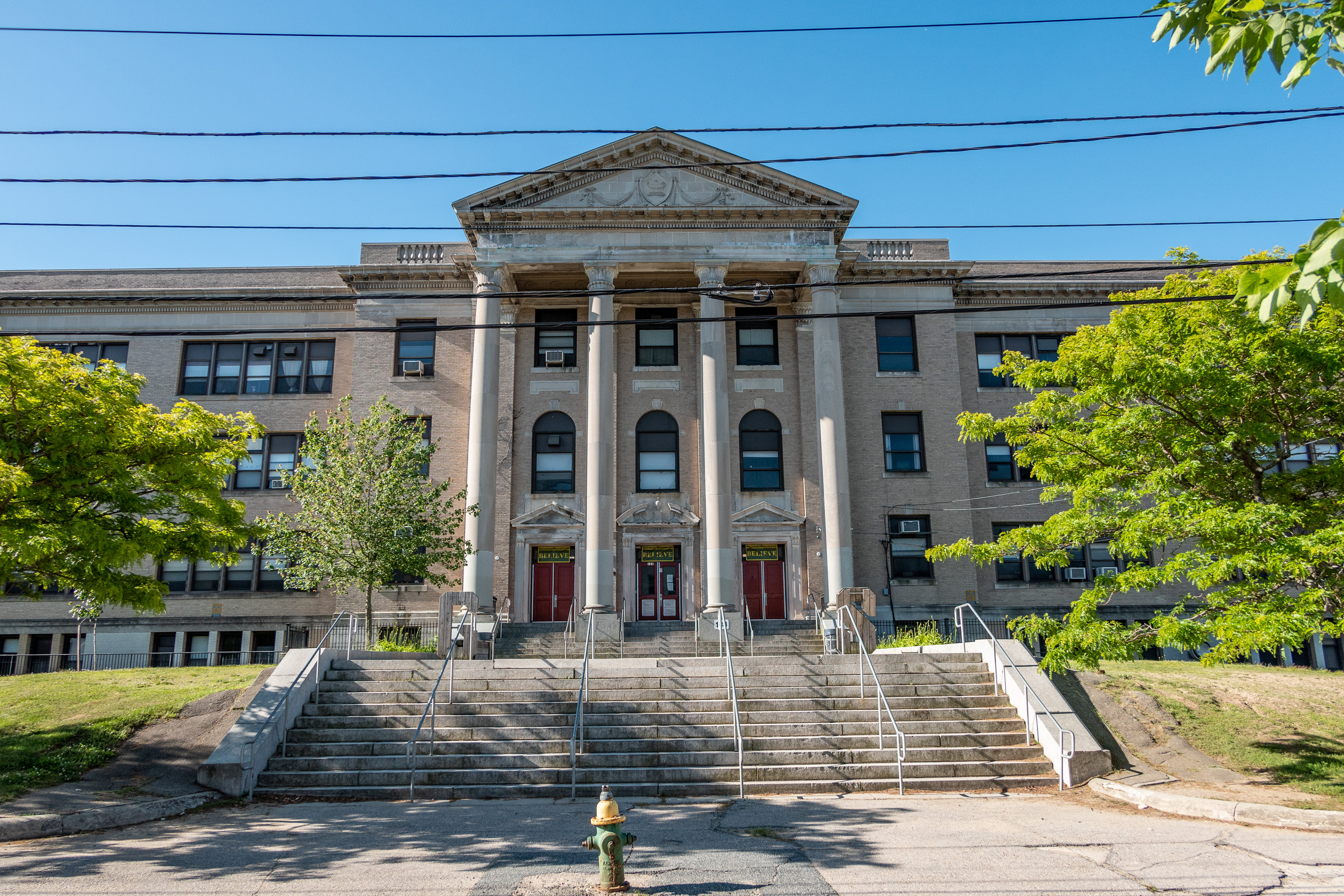
Gilbert Stuart Middle School

Alfred Lima and Asa Messer Elementary Schools are both located in the West End area. Also, the West End Community Center, an afterschool program, is located on Bucklin Street.

== See also ==
- Broadway–Armory Historic District
