= Mechanical Fabric Company =

- U.S. National Register of Historic Places
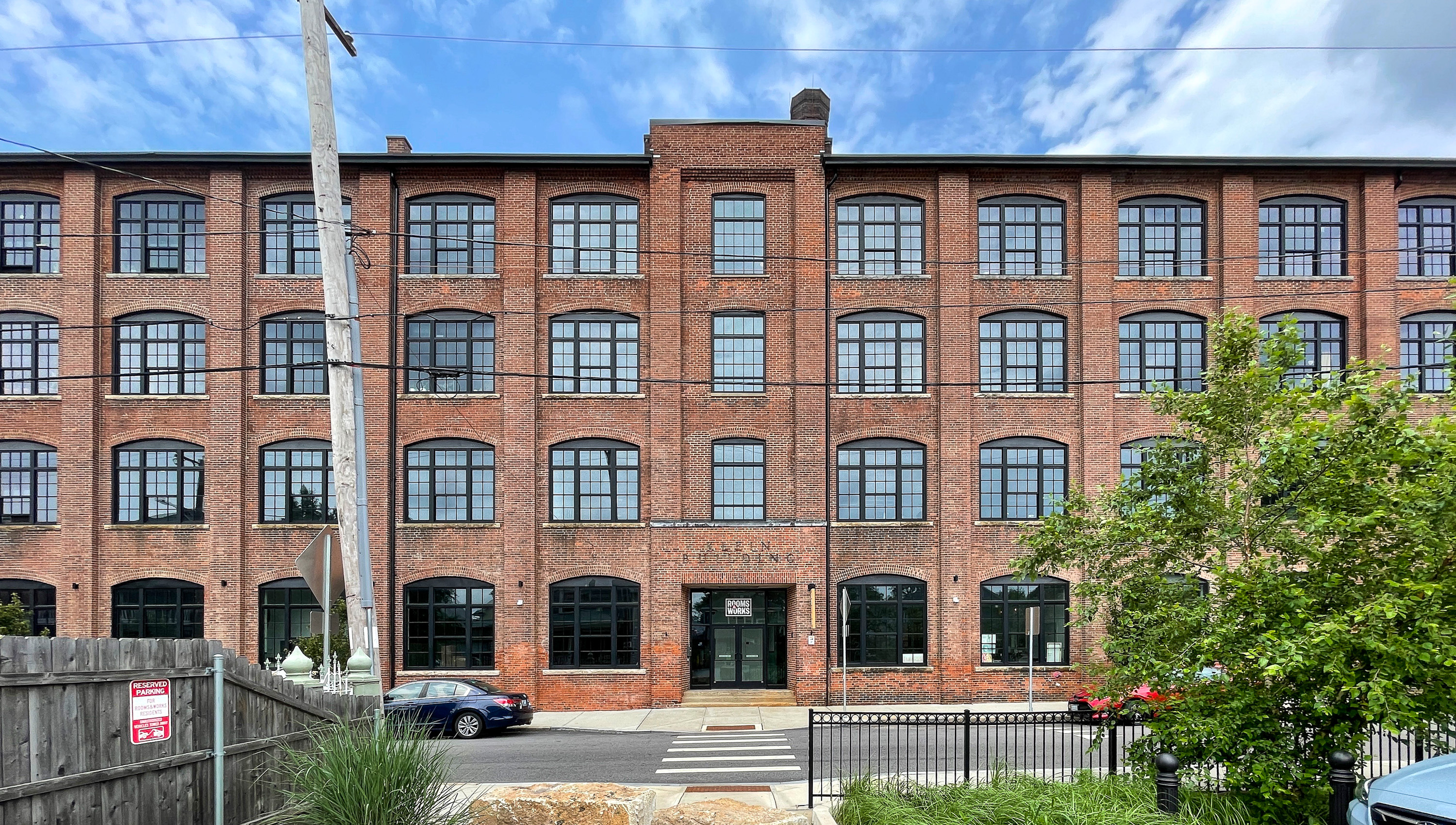
- 55 Cromwell St is home to commercial kitchens in 2021

- Location within Rhode Island Location within the United States
- Location: 55 Cromwell St., 40, 40R, 50, and 50R Sprague St., Providence, Rhode Island
- Coordinates: 41°48′33″N 71°25′35″W
- Built: 1891
- NRHP reference No.: 13001059
- Added to NRHP: January 8, 2014

The Mechanical Fabric Company is a historic factory complex on Cromwell and Sprague Streets in the West End neighborhood of Providence, Rhode Island.

== Description ==
The complex consists of six brick buildings, arranged in roughly parallel rows in a city block bounded by Cromwell, Sprague, and Dexter Streets, and Elmwood Avenue. They were built between 1891 and about 1925. The Mechanical Fabric Company was a major player in the city's rubber industry, and was particularly notable as the site of innovations in the development and manufacture of pneumatic bicycle tires.

The complex was listed on the National Register of Historic Places in 2014.

Mechanical Fabric Company views

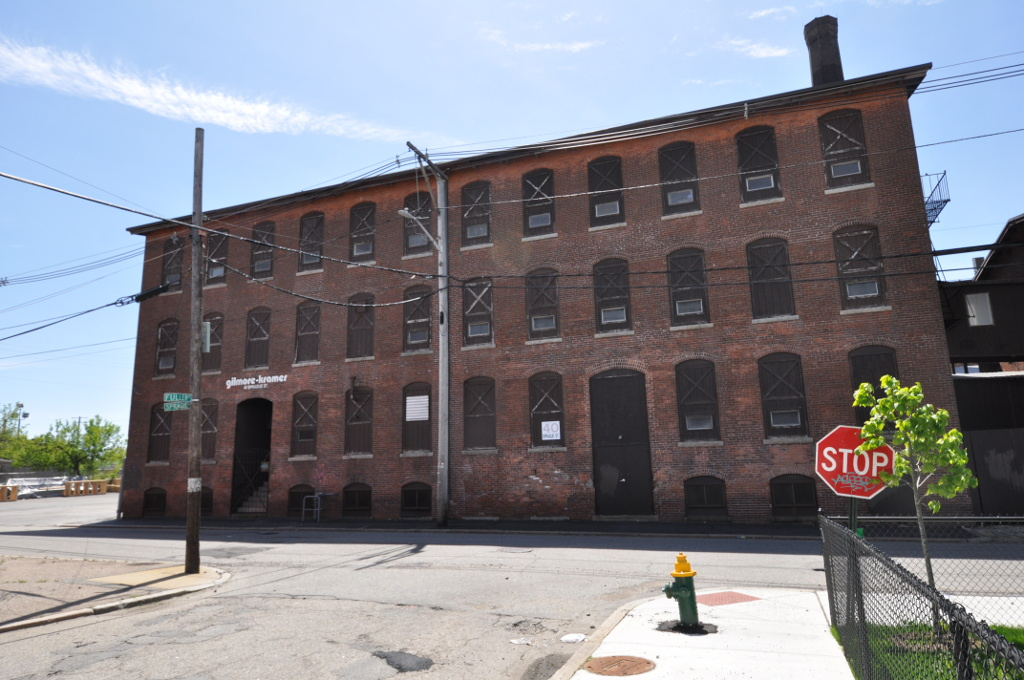
40 Sprague St. in disrepair in 2017

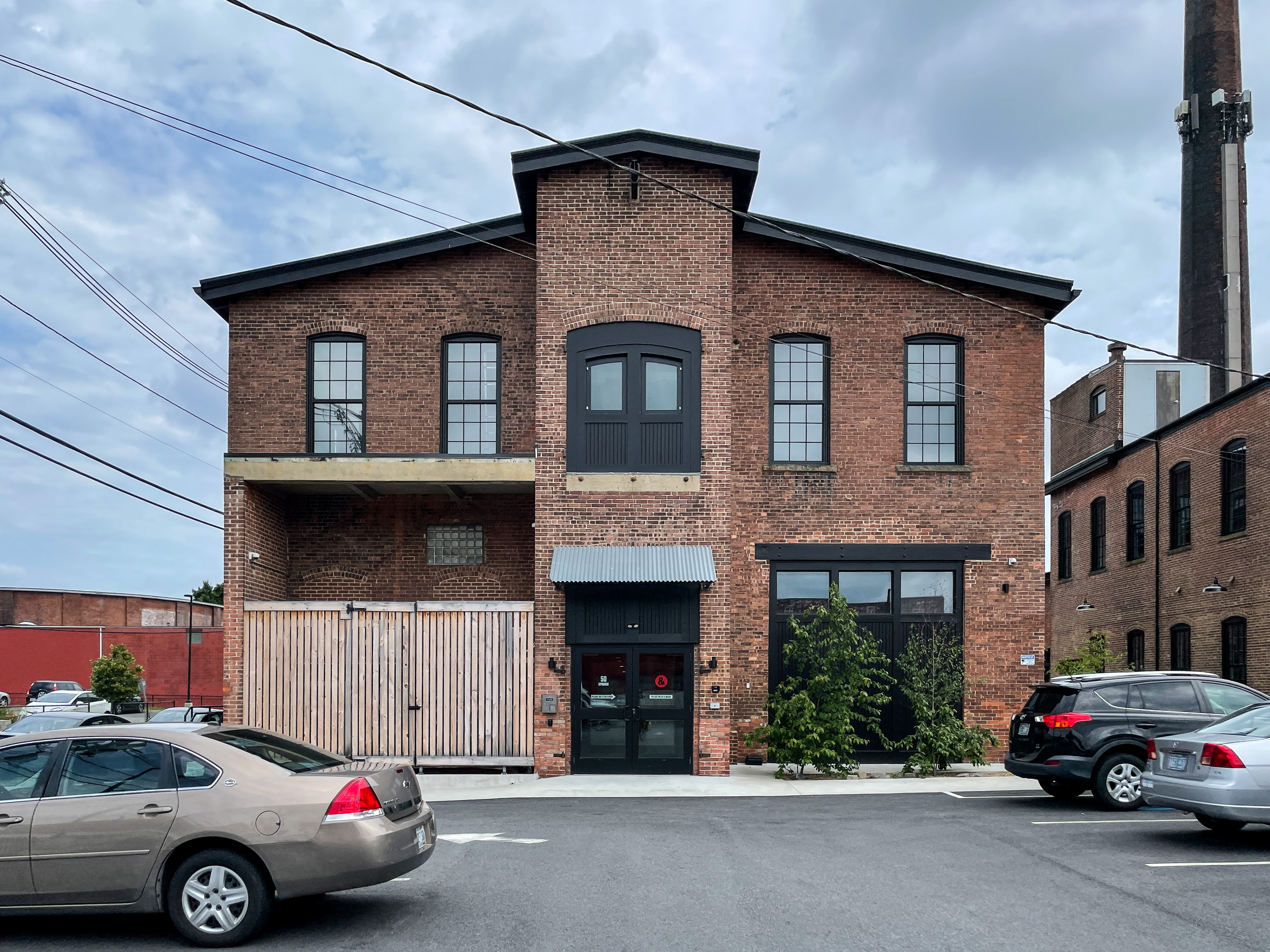
50 Sprague Street is home to "Rooms & Works" residences and workspaces in 2021

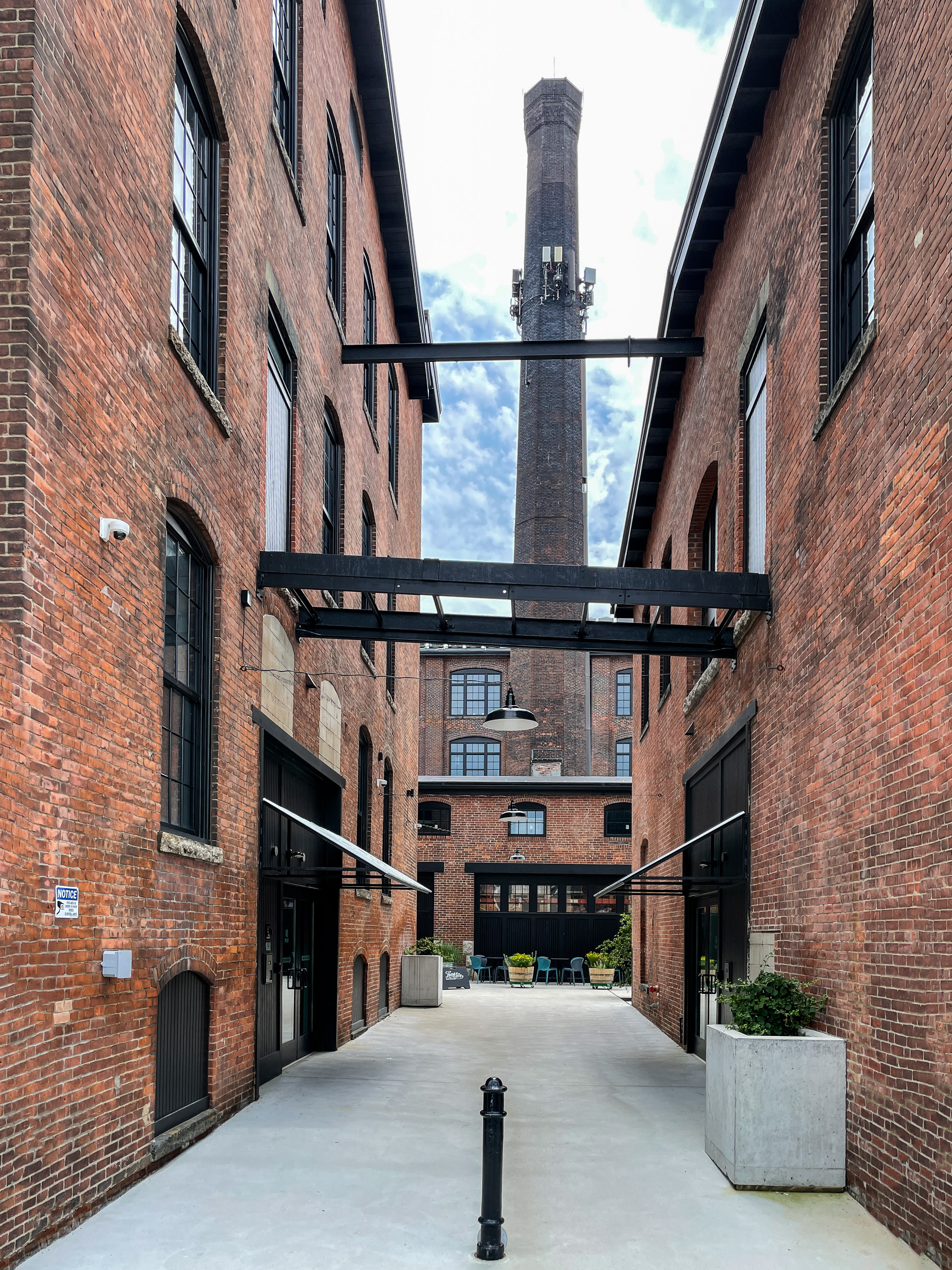
The old factory smokestack can be seen between 40R and 50 Sprague Streets

== Renovations ==
The former mill space was renovated to include several businesses. The larger building at 55 Cromwell Street has been rebranded as "Rooms & Works." It was briefly home to a food incubator, and in 2019 a local gourmet doughnut company moved in with a 5,000 square foot commercial kitchen. Also in 2019, the former mill building at 40R Sprague Street welcomed a two-level, 3,500-square-foot bar and brewery.

== See also ==
- National Register of Historic Places listings in Providence, Rhode Island

== See also ==
- National Register of Historic Places listings in Providence, Rhode Island
