= The Three Stooges (2012 film) =

Film by Bobby and Peter Farrelly

- Theatrical release poster
- Directed by: Peter Farrelly; Bobby Farrelly
- Written by: Mike Cerrone; Peter Farrelly; Bobby Farrelly
- Based on: The Three Stooges by Ted Healy
- Produced by: Peter Farrelly; Bobby Farrelly; Bradley Thomas; Charles B. Wessler
- Starring: Chris Diamantopoulos; Sean Hayes; Will Sasso; Jane Lynch; Sofía Vergara; Jennifer Hudson; Craig Bierko; Stephen Collins; Larry David
- Cinematography: Matthew F. Leonetti
- Edited by: Sam Seig
- Music by: John Debney
- Production companies: C3 Entertainment; Charles B. Wessler Entertainment; Conundrum Entertainment
- Distributed by: 20th Century Fox
- Release date: April 13, 2012
- Running time: 92 minutes
- Country: United States
- Language: English
- Budget: $30 million
- Box office: $54.8 million

The Three Stooges (promoted as The Three Stooges: The Movie) is a 2012 American slapstick comedy film based on the 1925–1970 comedy trio of the same name. It was produced, written and directed by the Farrelly brothers and co-written by Mike Cerrone. It stars Chris Diamantopoulos, Sean Hayes, and Will Sasso, re-creating the eponymous characters played by Moe Howard, Larry Fine and Curly Howard.

The story updates the Stooges in a 21st-century setting, where they try to save their childhood orphanage from foreclosure while inadvertently getting mixed up in a murder plot and a reality TV show.

The film was in development hell for a decade, stemming from casting issues and other delays. The principal photography took place from May to July 2011. The film was released by 20th Century Fox on April 13, 2012. It received mixed reviews by critics, who praised its performances (specifically those by Diamantopoulos, Hayes and Sasso), the humor and Farrelly brothers' direction along with faithfulness to the source material, but the convoluted narrative was lambasted.

== Plot ==
The film has three acts, referred to as episodes (a reference to how the original Three Stooges short films were packaged for television by Columbia Pictures).

=== Episode 1: More Orphan Than Not ===
In 1977, at the Sisters of Mercy Orphanage, three destructive infants (Moe, Larry, and Curly) are thrown in a duffel bag onto the orphanage's doorstep from an unknown person's car. The trio wreaks havoc in the place, terrifying the nuns—especially Sister Mary-Mengele (played by Larry David), who has always hated them.

10 years later, in 1987, desperate to be rid of the three, the nuns tell a prospective adoptive couple that the trio are the only three children available. They're then forced to add a fourth for consideration when a boy named Teddy wanders into the room. The Harters pick Moe; but when he requests that Larry and Curly join him, they take him back to the orphanage and choose Teddy instead.

25 years later, in the present, the trio are adults (played by Chris Diamantopoulos as Moe, Sean Hayes as Larry, and Will Sasso as Curly), still living at the orphanage and working as maintenance men. Monsignor Ratliffe tells Mother Superior (played by Jane Lynch) that the orphanage must be closed, and she tells Sister Mary-Mengele to fetch the trio. The three are trying to fix the malfunctioning bell on the roof; but when Larry removes the bell's "DO NOT REMOVE" tag (misreading it as "Donut Remover"), it falls and injures Sister Mary-Mengele just as she arrives. When they go to the Mother Superior, another accident causes Monsignor Ratliffe to fall on top of the nuns. Moe, Larry and Curly, thinking he is "getting fresh" with the nuns, attack him, until Mother Superior stops them. Ratliffe will not adopt them either as he is on official business.

Mother Superior tells everyone that the orphanage must close unless they can raise $830,000 in 30 days. The trio volunteers to try to raise the money.

=== Episode 2: The Bananas Split ===
A subplot involves a woman named Lydia (played by Sofia Vergara), who wants to kill her husband so she can be with her lover, Mac, and inherit her husband's fortune. She finds the trio and offers to pay them to take care of the hit job, pretending that Mac is her terminally ill husband that wants to be put out of his misery and have him switch with her real husband when the moment comes. They botch the job by letting Curly push Mac in front of a bus and leave Mac in traction in the hospital. When they try to visit Mac in the hospital to finish the job, they are chased by two police officers, escape by jumping off the roof using a fire hose, and run into a now grown-up Teddy, who invites them to his anniversary party and an opportunity to settle at his home, but Moe refuses.

It is then revealed that Teddy is actually Lydia's husband. The trio's next scheme for raising the money is selling farm-raised salmon, with them scattering live salmon on a golf range and watering them like produce. But the same police officers from the hospital arrive at the golf course to arrest them and the trio gets chased off the golf course and they hide in an old building. After having a slapstick fight, Larry and Curly scold Moe for rejecting Teddy's invitation and his father's earlier adoption attempt that they could have used his adoptive parents' wealth to help save the orphanage. Hurt, Moe tells them to leave, saying that he is tired of being with them. After deciding to split up, Larry and Curly leave the old building, with Moe inside alone. Then it turns out that they were all on stage in front of an audition crew who select Moe to be the newest cast member of Jersey Shore as "Dyna-Moe", much to his shock and surprise.

=== Final Episode: No Moe Mr. Nice Guy ===
Larry and Curly are getting along well without Moe, but they worry about him and decide to return to the orphanage to find him. There, they find out that a girl named Murph is very ill but has not been taken to the hospital because the orphanage has no medical insurance. Sister Mary-Mengele angrily tells them that no one will insure the orphanage due to the trio's numerous accidents and injuries over the years, and the $830,000 is needed to cover medical bills they owe from previous claims, which is also the reason why the orphanage is being closed down.

Larry and Curly meet up with Teddy's adopted father to talk about what happened with the orphanage. Teddy's father confesses that Moe wanted him to go back for his friends to adopt them, and he thought three kids would be too many to handle, so he gave Moe back and took Teddy in his place. Then Larry and Curly discover a picture of Teddy and Mr. Harter with Lydia and Mac, and realize that Teddy is the husband that Lydia wanted to murder. In addition, they feel guilty for rebuking Moe in not accepting the Harter's adoption and decide to find him.

Meanwhile, Moe has been causing a havoc on Jersey Shore by slapping, eye-poking, and head-bopping the cast members and not putting up with their spoiled antics. The cast goes to the producer and tells him to kick Moe off of the show or they will sue him. The producer then informs them that the show is all about the ratings and not them. Larry and Curly go to the set of Jersey Shore to reunite with Moe, and they all head to the anniversary party where they show up to thwart the murder plot, getting in as balloon men.

When they get inside, Curly gives the balloons to a little girl and she floats into the air. Later, they get chased by Lydia and Mac after the same girl's balloons are popped and she falls onto the wedding cake, destroying it. Moe, Larry, and Curly are chased into Teddy's bedroom, finding Teddy on the bed, drowsy. Mac then confesses that Lydia was "calling the shots", but Mr. Harter corrects Mac and admits that he was the real mastermind and Lydia was working for him. He married into the money and was incensed to find out the money was left to Teddy and not him when Teddy's mother died years earlier.

They are taken for a ride, but the car crashes into a lake when Curly's pet rat Nippy digs into Lydia's cleavage. They all escape when Curly farts, and Moe ignites it with some "easy-light, waterproof safety matches" that Larry had, causing enough of an explosion to blow out the windows. Once they are back on land, Mr. Harter, Lydia, and Mac are arrested. The trio then asks Teddy if he can provide them the $830,000 needed to save the orphanage but he sternly refuses, stating that he can't support the orphanage that adopted him to Mr. Harter.

A couple of months later, the heartbroken trio return to the now-condemned/abandoned orphanage. However, they quickly discover that a new orphanage was built next door and learn that the money came from the Jersey Shore's producers, who consider this as an advance payment in relation to a new reality show, Nuns vs. Nitwits, in which the entire trio will take part.

Murph is revealed to be fine, and her illness was due to metal poisoning. She, along with her friend Peezer and his brother Weezer, are adopted by Teddy and his new fiancée, Ling, who was Teddy's father's secretary. In the end, after Curly accidentally knocks Sister Mary-Mengele into the pool as the orphanage celebrates the adoption, the trio run away, bounce off some trampolines over the hedge and land on some mules, on which they clumsily ride into the distance.

=== Post-script epilogue ===
An epilogue consists of two actors playing Bobby and Peter Farrelly, explaining that the stunts were all done by professionals, showing the foam rubber props used in the film for the trio to hit one another, demonstrating the fake eye-poke trick (to the eyebrows), and advising children not to try any of the stunts at home.

During the end credits, a music video plays showing the Stooges and Sister Rosemary performing "It's a Shame", originally recorded by The Spinners in 1970, interspersed with excerpts from deleted scenes and a couple of brief outtakes. Though credited to "The Spinners and The Three Stooges", Hudson's own distinctive vocals can also be heard.

== Cast ==
- Chris Diamantopoulos as Moe Howard, the bossiest and more short-tempered member of the Stooges.
  - Skyler Gisondo as young Moe
- Sean Hayes as Larry Fine, the reasonable and most grounded member of the Stooges.
  - Lance Chantiles-Wertz as young Larry
- Will Sasso as Curly Howard, the more wild and most childish member of the Stooges.
  - Robert Capron as young Curly
- Larry David as Sister Mary-Mengele, a bad-tempered and strict nun at the orphanage, who has a massive grudge against the Stooges.
- Jane Lynch as Mother Superior, the head nun of the orphanage in which the Stooges grew up.
- Sofía Vergara as Lydia Harter, Teddy's former wife who wants to exploit the Stooges and murder Teddy to gain his inheritance.
- Jennifer Hudson as Sister Rosemary, a nun who works at the orphanage who is a talented singer.
- Craig Bierko as Mac Mioski, Lydia's former lover and henchman.
- Stephen Collins as Mr. Harter, Teddy's adoptive father, a corrupt lawyer who married for money, rather than for love; wants to murder his adopted son Teddy out of spite because his late wife and Teddy's deceased adoptive mother left her inheritance to Teddy rather than himself.
- Kirby Heyborne as Theodore J. "Teddy" Harter, a long-lost friend of the Stooges who they met at the orphanage who was adopted as a child by the Harters.
- Emy Coligado as Ling, Mr. Harter's former, friendly secretary who eventually becomes Teddy's fiancé after he divorces Lydia
- Avalon Robbins as Murph, a sick young girl at the orphanage who is a friend of the Stooges; adopted by Teddy and Ling
- Max Charles as Peezer, Weezer's older brother, Murph's best friend and a friend of the Stooges; adopted by Teddy and Ling
- Reid Meadows as Weezer, Peezer's younger brother; adopted by Teddy and Ling.
- Brian Doyle-Murray as Monsignor Ratliffe, the head of the diocese who the Stooges mistakenly call "Señor Ratlips".
- Lin Shaye as Nursery Nurse, a nurse who works at the hospital
- Caitlin Colford as Katilyn, a nurse who first notices the Stooges when they first come to the orphanage.
- Carly Craig as Mrs. Harter, Mr. Harter's wife who adopted Teddy and leaves the entire inheritance to Teddy over her husband after she dies in a hunting accident.
- Kate Upton as Sister Bernice, a kind-hearted, sexy nun at the orphanage
- Marianne Leone as Sister Ricarda, a nun at the orphanage
- Isaiah Mustafa as Ralph, a producer for Jersey Shore
- Nicole "Snooki" Polizzi as herself
- Mike "The Situation" Sorrentino as himself
- Jennifer "JWoww" Farley as herself
- Ronnie Ortiz-Magro as himself
- Samantha "Sweetheart" Giancola as herself
- Dwight Howard as himself, a basketball player who teaches at the new orphanage
- Lee Armstrong as Officer Armstrong
- Roy Jenkins as Officer Mycroft
- Justin Lopez and Antonio Sabàto Jr. as Peter & Bobby Farrelly, the co-directors of the film, who are both seen during the post-script epilogue explaining the stunts
- Jerod Mayo and Troy Brown both provide cameo roles

== Production ==
=== Development and writing ===
A Three Stooges film set in the modern day had been in development during the show's 60th anniversary; Mad About You creator Danny Jacobson wrote and developed a version in 1997 that had Phil Hartman attached to play Moe. Conundrum Entertainment's Bradley Thomas became attached to The Three Stooges around 2000 with Columbia Pictures. In March 2001, Warner Bros. bought the feature rights from C3 Entertainment and Peter and Bobby Farrelly became involved. They along with co-writer Mike Cerrone completed the script in mid-to-late 2002 and began shopping it. In 2004, with no talent being attached to the project, their rights expired and it was acquired by First Look Studios and C3 Entertainment. In November 2008, Metro-Goldwyn-Mayer (MGM) acquired the Farrelly's Warner Bros. scripts and the rights from C3 Entertainment, and was given a budget of $40 million with a release date of November 20, 2009. In March 2009, after struggling with casting delays, the release date was pushed to 2010, but the filmmakers still did not have a cast set. In November 2010, MGM filed bankruptcy and the following month the project was taken over by 20th Century Fox in hopes to have released the film in 2011.

The Farrellys said that they were not going to do a biopic or remake, but instead new Three Stooges episodes set in the present day. The film was divided into three segments, each with a stand-alone story, and each being 27 minutes long. The Farrellys aimed to receive a PG rating from the MPAA, while still incorporating physical comedy. In Britain several images were cut before the film achieved the equivalent rating. The Farrellys have also said it would have "non-stop slapping, more in the tone of Dumb and Dumber than we've done. Our goal is 85 minutes of laughs in a film that will be very respectful of who the Stooges were. It's by far the riskiest project we've ever done, without question, but it is also the one closest to our hearts."

=== Casting ===
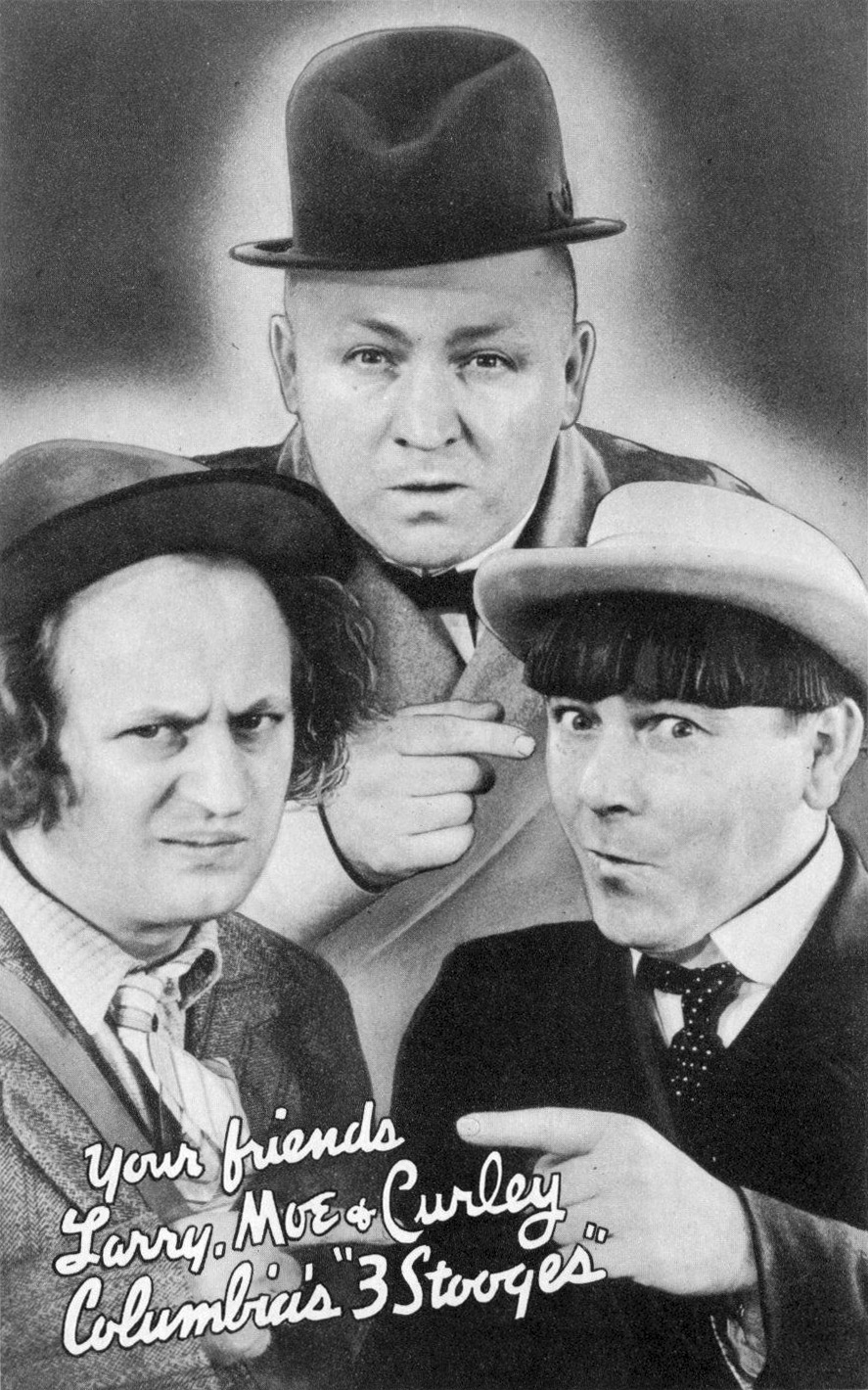
The original Three Stooges in 1937

In March 2009, Benicio del Toro was set to play Moe Howard, but dropped out after several delays. Through several delays of development, Ben Stiller, Brad Pitt, Russell Crowe, Colin Farrell, and Mel Gibson were in consideration to play the lead role of Moe. Hank Azaria was set to play Moe, but asked for a lot of money. The role of Moe went to Chris Diamantopoulos. Diamantopoulos revealed that he showed up to the audition in full costume, only to see a sign out front asking to "not show up in character". Over six months, he was called back fourteen times. Afterwards, he got a call from the Farrellys asking him if he was going to do the film. Confused, he called his agent, who revealed that he had gotten the part, but that the agent (who, Diamantopoulos had stated previously, was against the role) was waiting on telling him. Angered, he fired his agent on the spot and accepted the role.

Sean Penn was already set to play Larry Fine but dropped out to concentrate on his charitable efforts in Haiti.Justin Timberlake, Paul Giamatti, Nick Swardson, Woody Harrelson, Matt Besser, and Jeff Daniels were all considered for the role of Larry. James Marsden was already set to play Larry, it remains unknown if he dropped out or if production passed on him. Sean Hayes was chosen to play Larry. Bill Chott, Bobby Moynihan, Mike Myers, Tommy Snider, and Brian Baumgartner were all considered for the role of Curly Howard. Jim Carrey was set to play Curly and gained 40 pounds for the role but ultimately dropped out because of not wanting to endanger his health gaining 60 to 70 pounds. The role went to Will Sasso. Johnny Knoxville, Andy Samberg and Shane Jacobson were all on the short list to play Moe, Larry and Curly, respectively, with Knoxville supposedly having turned it down as he refused to commit to doing an impersonation. As the Farrellys note in the DVD/Blu-ray featurette on casting the picture, Sasso was cast as Curly despite being considerably taller than the other Stooges (the original Curly was roughly the same height as Moe and Larry).

In December 2010, Richard Jenkins was in talks to play Mother Superior in the film. In February 2011, Cher was considered but Jane Lynch secured the role. Larry David plays another nun in the film called Sister Mary-Mengele, a character named after the infamous Nazi doctor. Sofía Vergara was cast as Lydia. Stephen Collins was cast as Mr. Harter and Carly Craig as his wife, Mrs. Harter. The cast of Jersey Shore (Nicole Polizzi, Michael Sorrentino, Sammi Giancola, Jennifer Farley, and Ronnie Ortiz-Magro) have cameos in the film.

=== Filming ===
On a reported budget of $30 million, principal photography started on May 9, 2011, in downtown Atlanta, Georgia and wrapped on July 20, 2011. Scenes were shot at the Fairlie-Poplar Historic District around 5 Points Sports Building on the corner of Peachtree St., Edgewood Ave., and Decatur St. on the evening and night of May 13 and wrapped the next day. Other locations included Piedmont Park, Emory Saint Joseph's Hospital, Zoo Atlanta, and Colony Square. In June, production moved to Cartersville and shot scenes near Woodland High School. After the cast of the Jersey Shore arrived on July 18, 2011, they shot scenes at the Atlanta Civic Center. During the last two days of filming, scenes were shot at an Ansley Park home. Filming concluded on July 22, 2011, at the Miami Seaquarium, a popular marine life park in Florida, capturing a scene in their dolphin tank.

== Release ==
=== Appearance on WWE Raw ===
To promote the film, Diamantopoulos, Hayes, and Sasso appeared as the Stooges on WWE Raw on April 9, 2012. They acted in several scenes, the first with Santino Marella, before later taking to the ring where they were booed by an infuriated crowd before Sasso, dressed as Hulk Hogan, received a chokeslam by Kane.

== Reception ==
=== Box office ===
On its opening weekend in the US, The Three Stooges earned $17.1 million and debuted second behind The Hunger Games. The film grossed $54,819,301 in the box office, and at least $25,013,185 through US home video sales.

=== Critical reception ===
On the review aggregator website Rotten Tomatoes, 51% of 148 critics' reviews are positive, with an average rating of 5.4/10. The website's consensus reads: "While nowhere near as painful as it could have been, The Three Stooges fails to add fresh laughs to the Stooges' inestimable cinematic legacy." Metacritic, which uses a weighted average, assigned the film a score of 56 out of 100, based on 26 critics, indicating "mixed or average" reviews. Audiences polled by CinemaScore gave the film an average grade of "B−" on an A+ to F scale. Despite the mixed reviews, Diamantopoulos, Hayes, and Sasso were praised for their performances as Moe, Larry, and Curly.

Todd McCarthy of The Hollywood Reporter described it as "[A] funny, good-hearted resuscitation of Hollywood's beloved lowbrow lunkheads", while Manohla Dargis of The New York Times lauded the film as a "thoroughly enjoyable paean to Moe, Larry and Curly and the art of the eye poke". Spill.com gave the movie a fairly good review, insisting that the movie is great for families, and hardcore Stooge-fans will not be disappointed. They also went on to praise the actors for their portrayal of the Stooges, saying the likeness was uncanny, and perhaps even Oscar-worthy. Roger Ebert gave the movie two-and-a-half out of four stars, stating "The Farrelly brothers have made probably the best Three Stooges movie it's possible to make in 2012, and perhaps ever since the Stooges stopped making them themselves." Some critics, however, complained about the forced pop culture references such as cameos by Jersey Shore cast members which were presumably done to ensure the movie would have youth appeal and not simply be a nostalgia trip for older audiences.

Betsy Sherman of The Boston Phoenix gave it three out of four stars, saying it was "funny and faithful", and added that the film contains "stories that could have graced [the Stooges]' 1930s shorts (raise money to save an orphanage, stumble into a greedy wife's plot) onto the present and imagine how they'd interpret modern concepts (farm-raised salmon)".

Peter Travers of Rolling Stone magazine gave it two stars out of four, commenting that "the movie is a mixed bag. The gags don't blossom with repetition. The Stooges were always better in short doses. And 90 minutes of PG nyuk-nyuk-nyuk can seem like an eternity. For the Farrellys, The Three Stooges is a labor of love. For non-believers, it's merely a labor." Travers also praised the cast, stating "The actors deserve a full-throated woo-woo-woo!" adding that "Hayes, Sasso, and Diamantopoulos do themselves and the Stooges proud." James White of Empire gave the film a two out of five stars, saying, "The mooted Stooges – Sean Penn, Jim Carrey, Benicio del Toro – dodged a bullet judging by this muddle of creaky slapstick and laugh-free plotting."

Bill Wine of KYW Newsradio 1060 in Philadelphia commented that "no one's going to confuse The Three Stooges with a transcendent movie anytime soon, but the Farrellys do capture and reproduce the anarchic spirit and uninhibited essence of the Stooges—soitenly and poifectly, as the Stooges would put it—and remind us why they had such a hold on some of us in decades past. The three leads are expert mimics—especially Hayes...they acquit themselves admirably..."

=== Criticism for anti-Christianity ===
Bill Donohue, president of the Catholic League anti-defamation organization, released a statement condemning the movie on the grounds of disrespectful portrayals of Christians, specifically nuns. Donohue claims that the movie is evidence of increasing hostility towards religion in Hollywood, commenting "In the 1950s, Hollywood generally avoided crude fare and was respectful of religion. Today, it specializes in crudity and trashes Christianity, especially Catholicism." Donohue added that the movie "is not just another remake: it is a cultural marker of sociological significance, and what it says about the way we've changed is not encouraging."

Donohue pinpoints one scene in which the film pushes the envelope with its portrayals of two unusual nuns, respectively portrayed by model Kate Upton, and Curb Your Enthusiasm star/creator Larry David. Both are potential causes for the offense for different reasons, as Moviefone reports:

In Stooges, David portrays Sister Mary-Mengele. The name is a nod to the late Nazi Josef Mengele, an SS Officer who decided the prisoners' fates at Auschwitz. As for Upton, it's not so much her character's name—Sister Bernice—as it is her attire. During one scene, the SI swimsuit model dons a very revealing bikini along with a large rosary around her neck.

Close-up footage of Upton exiting the pool in front of a group of children (which Curly comments that there's something different about her and asks if she got a haircut) appears in the film's trailer, but not in the movie itself nor DVD/Blu-ray deleted scenes; in the final film, she is only seen sitting in a chair and briefly in the background of a group shot while in her swimsuit (in her other scenes, she is dressed in standard nun attire).

=== Accolades ===
The Three Stooges received a nomination for Most Original TV Spot at the 2012 Golden Trailer Awards. At the Houston Film Critics Society Awards 2012, it was nominated for Worst Film of the Year.

== Home media ==
The Three Stooges was released on DVD and Blu-ray on July 17, 2012.

== Possible sequel ==
On May 8, 2015, a sequel was announced with Diamantopoulos, Hayes and Sasso set to reprise their roles. Production was set to begin in 2018 but as of 2026, no new updates have been announced.

== Soundtrack ==
The Three Stooges:Soundtrack

Soundtrack album by Various artists
- Released: March 12, 2012
- Genres: R&B, Pop, pop-rock
- Label: Capitol

1. "It's a Shame" – The Spinners (performed by cast members; Chris Diamantopoulos, Sean Hayes, Will Sasso and Jennifer Hudson)
2. "Roadrunner" – The Modern Lovers
3. "A Candle's Fire – Beirut
4. "Walkie Talkie Man" – Steriogram
5. "Pulled Up" – Talking Heads
6. "Tongue Tied" – Grouplove
7. "Can't Stop Thinking" – Buva
8. "Dance Like A Monkey" – The New York Dolls
9. "Get Crazy" – LMFAO
10. "Feel Like Going Home" – Charlie Rich
11. "Waste" – Foster the People
12. "Si Señor Bob " – Papo Vazquez
13. "Three Stooges" – Iggy Pop and the Stooges (performed by cast members; Chris Diamantopoulos, Sean Hayes, Will Sasso)
14. "Just Like Tom Thumb's Blues" – Bob Dylan
