= Vault (film) =

- Theatrical release poster
- Directed by: Tom DeNucci
- Written by: Tom DeNucci; B. Dolan
- Produced by: Chad A. Verdi
- Starring: Theo Rossi; Clive Standen; Chazz Palminteri
- Production companies: Grindstone Entertainment; Verdi Productions; Dos Dudes Pictures
- Distributed by: Lionsgate
- Release dates: June 7, 2019 (Providence, Rhode Island premiere); June 14, 2019
- Running time: 99 minutes
- Country: United States
- Language: English
- Box office: $86,741

Vault is a 2019 American crime thriller film directed by Tom DeNucci, written by Tom DeNucci and B. Dolan, and starring Theo Rossi, Clive Standen, Samira Wiley, and Chazz Palminteri. It was released on June 7, 2019. It is based on the Bonded Vault heist in 1975 in Rhode Island.

== Plot ==
Two small-time criminals and longtime friends, as Deuce (Theo Rossi) and Chucky (Clive Standen), graduate from robbing pawn shops and jewelry stores and become involved in a plan to rob a mafia vault.

They are recruited with a group of small time criminals by Gerry “The Frenchman” Ouimette (Don Johnson), the right-hand man for Providence Mafia boss Raymond Patriarca (Chazz Palminteri). Patriarca is a notorious gangster and executioner who although in jail, continues running his crime empire from inside his well-appointed jail cell.

The crew pull off the biggest heist in American history: stealing over $30 million from a fur dealer's vault that the Mafia uses as its unofficial bank to store cash and stolen goods.

After the heist, they turn most of it over to Ouimette to fence while they lie low and hope for the heat to dissipate. Deuce hides out in a rural motel with his girlfriend Karyn, growing increasingly anxious. One by one, members of the crew are killed.

Deuce and Chucky become suspicious and turn on each other. Deuce is arrested and told Chucky was killed by the Mafia. He's told he might qualify for witness protection if he gives enough information. After confessing, he learns that Chucky is still alive.

== Cast ==
- Theo Rossi as Deuce (real name: Robert Dussault)
- Clive Standen as Chucky (Charles Flynn)
- Samira Wiley as Karyn
- Chazz Palminteri as Raymond Patriarca Sr.
- Don Johnson as Gerry Ouimette
- William Forsythe as Buddy Providence
- Sean Ringgold as Buddy Roxbury
- Chuck Zito as Joey Bruno
- Vincent Pastore as Frank
- Eric Lutes as Buddy Barrington
- Burt Young as Don Ruggiero
- Antonio Cupo as Dominic Ruggiero
- Dorothy Lyman as Ma
- John Fiore as Detective Caretti
- Ken Baltin as Abraham Levine

== Release ==
The film premiered in Providence, Rhode Island on June 7, 2019, and was released nationwide in theaters and via Video on demand on June 15.

== Reception ==
The film received mixed reviews from critics. In a review for The Hollywood Reporter, Justin Lowe writes: "DeNucci has a good sense for period detail, costuming and accessorizing the cast with a color palette ranging from earthy yellow through fashionable beige to muddy brown. Stylistically though, the film doesn’t have much in common with its most distinctive progenitors, missing an opportunity to re-create an authentic '70s aesthetic." Noel Murray, writing for the Los Angeles Times: "Writer-director Tom DeNucci, co-writer B. Dolan and a superb cast work hard to bring a fascinating, largely forgotten true story to life, though an inconsistent tone and an over-reliance on genre clichés keep the movie from realizing its potential."
