= William Forsythe (actor) =

American actor

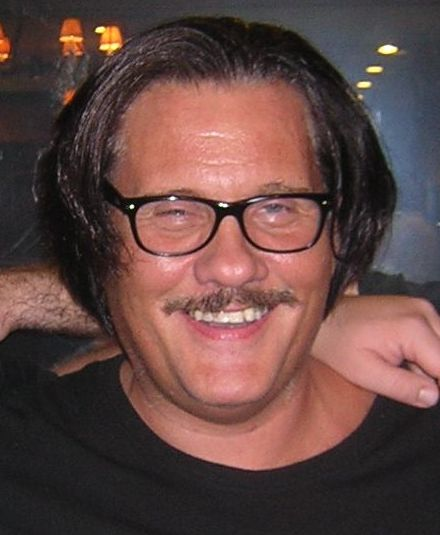
- Forsythe in 2007
- Born: June 7, 1955 (age 71); New York City, New York, U.S.
- Education: Beverly Hills Playhouse
- Occupation: Actor
- Years active: 1978–present
- Spouse: Teresa Stevens (m. 2024)
- Children: 3

William Forsythe (born June 7, 1955) is an American actor, known for his portrayals of tough-guy, criminal characters.

He appeared in the films Once Upon a Time in America (1984), Raising Arizona (1987), Dick Tracy (1990), American Me (1992), Gotti (1996), The Rock (1996), Blue Streak (1999), Blue Hill Avenue (2001), and The Devil's Rejects (2005). Forsythe was nominated for the Independent Spirit Award for Best Supporting Male for his performance in the film The Waterdance.

On television, he has played the roles of Al Capone on The Untouchables (1993-94), Manny Horvitz on Boardwalk Empire (2011-12), and J. Edgar Hoover on The Man in the High Castle (2018).

== Early life ==
Forsythe was born in the New York City borough of Brooklyn, and grew up in its Bedford–Stuyvesant neighborhood. He is of partial Italian descent with Italian (from his maternal grandfather), Scottish, English, Irish and German descent.

He began acting on stage as a teenager, before moving to Los Angeles to pursue a film career, studying at the Beverly Hills Playhouse.

== Career ==
Forsythe started out in minor film roles and guest appearances in TV shows including CHiPs (1977), Hill Street Blues (1981) and T. J. Hooker (1982). He appeared in Once Upon a Time in America (1984), co-starred with John Goodman in Raising Arizona (1987) and as a renegade soldier in Extreme Prejudice.

Forsythe also portrayed comic book villain "Flattop" in Dick Tracy (1990), co-starred with Steven Seagal in Out for Justice (1991) and appeared with former National Football League player Brian Bosworth in the biker action film Stone Cold (1991). He portrayed Al Capone in the short-lived '90s revival of the '60s TV crime show The Untouchables (1993), and also starred in The Waterdance (1992) and the film noir Things to Do in Denver When You're Dead (1995). Forsythe portrayed real-life mobster "Sammy The Bull" Gravano in Gotti (1996) and supported another ex-NFL player's foray into film acting when L.A. Raider Howie Long debuted in Firestorm (1998).

Forsythe portrayed serial killer John Wayne Gacy in Dear Mr. Gacy, a 2010 film adaptation of The Last Victim, the memoirs of Jason Moss, a college student who corresponded with Gacy during his last year on death row.

== Personal life ==
Forsythe has three children, including actress Rebecca Forsythe. In 2024, he married Teresa Stevens.

== Filmography ==
=== Film ===
Year	Title	Role	Notes
1978	Coach	Audience Member	
1978	Long Shot	Billy	
1981	King of the Mountain	Big Tom	
1981	Smokey Bites the Dust	Kenny	
1983	The Man Who Wasn't There	Pug Face Crusher	
1984	Once Upon a Time in America	Phil 'Cockeye' Stein	
1984	Cloak & Dagger	Morris	
1985	The Lightship	Gene	
1985	Savage Dawn	Pigiron	
1987	Raising Arizona	Evelle	
1987	Extreme Prejudice	SGT. Buck Atwater	
1987	Weeds	Burt The Booster	
1988	Patty Hearst	Teko	
1989	Dead Bang	Arthur Kressler	
1989	Torrents of Spring	Prince Ippolito Polozov	
1989	Sons	Mikey	
1990	Dick Tracy	Flattop	
1991	Career Opportunities	Custodian	
1991	Out for Justice	Richie Madano	
1991	Stone Cold	'Ice' Hensley	
1992	The Waterdance	Bloss	
1992	American Me	J.D.	
1992	The Gun in Betty Lou's Handbag	Billy Beaudeen	
1993	Relentless 3	Walter Hilderman	
1994	Direct Hit	Hatch	
1995	Things to Do in Denver When You're Dead	Franchise	
1995	Beyond Desire	Ray Patterson	
1995	Virtuosity	William Cochran	
1995	Palookaville	Sid Dunleavy	
1995	The Immortals	Tim James	
1995	Thriller Zone	Marcus Deerfield	
1996	The Substitute	Holland	
1996	For Which He Stands	Johnny Rochetti	
1996	The Rock	FBI Agent Ernest Paxton	
1996	Rule of Three	Mitch	
1997	Big City Blues	Hudson	
1998	Firestorm	Randall Alexander Shaye	
1998	The Pass	Charles Duprey	
1998	Ambushed	Mike Organski	
1998	Soundman	Frank Rosenfeld	
1998	Hell's Kitchen	Lou	
1999	Row Your Boat	Gil Meadows	
1999	The Last Marshal	DeClerc	
1999	Four Days	Milt	
1999	Blue Streak	Detective Hardcastle	
1999	Deuce Bigalow: Male Gigolo	Detective Chuck Fowler	
1999	18 Shades of Dust	Tommy Cucci	
1999	Paradise Lost	Mike Stark	
2000	Luck of the Draw	Max Fenton	
2000	Civility	Andrew LeBretian	
2000	G-Men from Hell	Dean Crept	
2001	Camouflage	Alton Owens	
2001	Blue Hill Avenue	Detective Torrance	
2001	Sharkman	Tom Reed	
2001	Outlaw	Ted Castle	
2002	Coastlines	Fred Vance	
2002	Hard Cash	Bo Young	
2002	City by the Sea	Spyder	
2003	The Technical Writer	Joe	
2003	The Librarians	Simon	
2004	The Last Letter	Mr. Griffith	
2005	The L.A. Riot Spectacular	George Holliday	
2005	The Devil's Rejects	Sheriff John Quincy Wydell	
2006	Freedomland	Detective Boyle	
2006	Jam	Ted	
2007	88 Minutes	FBI Agent Frank Parks	
2007	Southern Gothic	Pitt	
2007	Hack!	Willy	
2007	Halloween	Ronnie White	
2008	Stiletto	Alex	
2008	iMurders	Professor Uberoth	
2009	The Nail: The Story of Joey Nardone	Massimo	
2009	Happy in the Valley	Stewart	
2010	Dear Mr. Gacy	John Gacy	
2010	The Rig	Jim Fleming	
2010	To Hell with You	Smith	Short
2011	L.A., I Hate You	Uncle Rip	
2011	Born to Ride	Jack Steele	
2011	Slip & Fall	Jerry	
2011	Inkubus	Ret. Detective Gil Diamante	
2011	Loosies	Captain Tom Edwards	
2011	Jesse	Vince the Godfather	
2012	Infected	Dr. Ed Dennehey	
2013	Road to Juarez	Doug Hermann	
2013	The Ghost Club: Spirits Never Die	Stanley	
2014	Tom Holland's Twisted Tales	Mr. Smith	
2014	Hidden in the Woods	Uncle Costello	
2015	Echoes of War	Randolph McCluskey	
2015	Laugh Killer Laugh	Frank Stone	
2015	The Networker	Charles Mangano	
2016	The Midnight Man	Fairbanks	
2016	The Bronx Bull	Jake LaMotta	
2016	The Hollow	John 'Big John' Dawson	
2016	The Unlikely's	Jet Black	
2017	Check Point	The Sheriff	
2019	Cold Pursuit	Brock 'Wingman' Coxman	
2019	Vault	Buddy Providence	
2019	Awake	Roger Bower	
2019	Run with the Hunted	Augustus	
2020	Roe v. Wade	Potter Stewart	
2020	I Am Fear	Marco	
2020	A Perfect Plan	Grayson	
2021	Ida Red	Lawrence Twilley	
2021	God's Not Dead: We the People	Robert Benson	
2023	Open	Captain Edgar J. Steadman	
2024	9 Windows	Detective Tim Boyle	
2025	The Roaring Game	Coach Rhodes	
2025	Rage	Tony	
2026	A Crime Story	Oren	
TBD	Godshot		Post-production
TBD	Straight Shot		Post-production

=== Television ===
Year	Title	Role	Notes
1981	The Miracle of Kathy Miller	Mark	TV movie (credited as Bill Forsythe)
1982	CHiPs	Thrasher	Episode: "Battle of the Bands"
1982	Tales of the Gold Monkey	Kurt	Episode: "Tales of the Gold Monkey: Part 1 & 2"
1983	Hill Street Blues	Richard Brady	Episode: "Moon Over Uranus: Part 1 & 2"
1983	T.J. Hooker	Wounded Assailant	Episode: "A Child Is Missing"
1983	Fame	Snake	Episode: "Break Dance"
1985	The Long Hot Summer	Isaac	Episode: "Part 1 & 2"
1985	Command 5	Hawk	TV movie
1988	Baja Oklahoma	Tommy Earl Browner	TV movie
1990	Blind Faith	Ferlin L'Heureux	Episode: "Part 1 & 2"
1992	Cruel Doubt	Police Chief John Crone	Episode: "Part 1 & 2"
1992	Willing to Kill: The Texas Cheerleader Story	Terry Harper	TV movie
1993	A Kiss to Die For	Detective Mike Stoller	TV movie
1993–94	The Untouchables	Al Capone	Main Cast
1996	Gotti	Sammy Gravano	TV movie
1997	First Time Felon	Sorley	TV movie
1998	Cybill	Bruce	Episode: "Dream Date"
1998	Dollar for the Dead	Dooley	TV movie
1999	Dead Man's Gun	Harlan Riddle	Episode: "A Just Reward"
2001	Mysterious Ways	Luther Skoals	Episode: "Condemned"
2001–02	UC: Undercover	Sonny Walker	Main Cast
2002–03	John Doe	Digger	Main Cast
2005	Wild Card	Stuart Dresden	Episode: "Zoe's Phony Matrimony"
2005	Larva	Jacob Long	TV movie
2005	Hammerhead: Shark Frenzy	Tom Reed	TV movie
2006	Prone to Violence	Narration	TV movie
2007	Masters of Horror	Buster	Episode: "We All Scream for Ice Cream"
2007	Final Approach	Silas Jansen	TV movie
2007	Las Vegas	Uncle Luke	Recurring Cast: Season 5
2007–09	Entourage	Eddie Kapowski	Guest Cast: Season 4 & 6
2010	CSI: Miami	Captain Chris Sutter	Episode: "L.A."
2011–12	Boardwalk Empire	Munya "Manny" Horvitz	Recurring Cast: Season 2-3
2011–12	The Mentalist	Steve Rigsby	Guest Cast: Season 3 & 5
2012–13	Mob Doctor	Constantine Alexander	Main Cast
2013	Twisted Tales	Mr. Smith	Episode: "To Hell with You"
2014	Justified	Michael	Episode: "Whistle Past the Graveyard"
2015–17	Hawaii Five-0	Harry Brown	Guest Cast: Season 5 & 7
2016	Marvel's Daredevil	Dutton	Episode: "Seven Minutes in Heaven"
2016	The Making of the Mob: Chicago	Himself	Recurring Guest
2017	Chicago Justice	David Zachariah	Episode: "Double Helix"
2017	Criminal Minds: Beyond Borders	Oleg Antakov	Episode: "The Ripper of Riga"
2018	The Man in the High Castle	J. Edgar Hoover	Recurring Cast: Season 3-4
2019	Magnum P.I.	Harry Brown	Crossover Cast: Season 2
2020	Primitive	Caro Kann	Episode: "Blind Sighted"
2021	Gravesend	Santini Traffato	2 episodes

== Awards and nominations ==
Ceremony	Category	Work	Result	Ref.
8th Independent Spirit Awards	Best Supporting Male	The Waterdance	Nominated	
