= Infected (2012 film) =

- Directed by: Glenn Ciano
- Written by: Glenn Ciano; Robert Rotondo Jr. Anthony Waller
- Produced by: Chad A. Verdi; Anthony Waller
- Starring: Michael Madsen; Christy Carlson Romano
- Cinematography: Ben DeLuca
- Edited by: Kathryn E. Prescott
- Distributed by: Woodhaven Production Company
- Release dates: October 13, 2012 (Rock and Shock); April 9, 2013 (United States)
- Running time: 95 minutes
- Country: United States
- Language: English

Infected is an American science-fiction action-horror film directed by Glenn Ciano. The film was presented as a prequel to Ciano's Inkubus.

== Plot ==
A father and his son must fight to survive against a deadly, rapidly spreading blood virus that has infected a group of hunters.

== Cast ==
- Michael Madsen as Louis
- Christy Carlson Romano as Kelly
- William Forsythe as Dr. Ed Dennehey
- Michael Nicolosi as Matt
- Myke Michaels as Infected In Window
- Johnny Cicco as Seth
- Lily Haze as Infected Woman
- Eric Norris as Infected Man
- Tom DeNucci as Andrew
- J. J. Perry as Infected Man
- Kristi Lynn as Infected Woman
- Manny Perry as Infected Man
- Brian Smrz as Infected Man
- Taylor Momsen as Sarah
- Bug Hall as Tom
- Kathryn E. Prescott as Infected Horde
- Tom Paolino as Infected Father
- Nicholas John Bilotta as Infected Man #1
- Sera Verdi as Sarah
- Wendy Overly as Annie O'Toole
- Annie Worden as Jessica
- Chad A. Verdi Jr. as Infected Son
- Jared Hartley as Infected Man #2
- Jeanine Kane as Angela
- Tracey Sheldon as Hooker
- Furio Spagliatelli as Infected Man #3
- Brian Steven Burke as Infected Mayor
- Jade Hartley as Infected Horde
- Charles James Wesley as Infected Attacker
- Kevin DeCristofano as Jeremy Dennehey
- Gary Roscoe as Infected
- George J. Vezina as Bald Infected With Beard
- Robert A Glenn as Infected Man In Business

== Production ==
Ciano began with the filming of the Horror-Action film in October 2010. Michael Madsen, Christy Carlson Romano and William Forsythe were cast as the leads of the film. The Woodhaven Production Company produced the film. Glenn Ciano co-wrote the script with Robert Rotondo Jr., but the story was originally an idea of Ciano's. The film was produced by director Glenn Ciano. It was filmed on location in Foster, Rhode Island.

== Release ==
The original release was set for the late 2010. The film premiered at Worcester's 2012 Rock and Shock Convention and was released onto DVD on April 9, 2013.

== Reception ==
John Townsend, writing for "HorrorNews.net" said, "The characters are blatant stereotypes, there is an alarming amount of soft focus used, the gory sections just aren’t convincing and some scenes are just in poor taste. It is as if the filmmakers weren’t sure quite what type of film they wanted to make; there is a bit of exploitation, a hint to survival horror, a pinch of a splatter movie, and what they have delivered is, to put as simply as possible, a mess."

Naila Scargill, writing for "Exquisite Terror" said, "Initially amusing due to a self-conscious, rather deliberate campiness, Infection Z rapidly dulls."

A review at Moirareviews praised the first part and its scenario and acting but lamented the film's lack of originality and directing in the end.
