= Michelle Ray Smith =

American actress

Michelle Ray Smith (born September 24, 1974) is an American soap opera actress and underwear model.

== Career ==
Smith has been featured in the Victoria’s Secret catalogue, and has been seen nationally in television commercials for Listerine, Noxzema, Oil of Olay, Dannon, and a well-known and recognized spot for Dentyne Ice. She currently resides in Brooklyn, New York.

In August 2005, Smith was introduced as a contract player on the daytime soap opera Guiding Light. She played Ava Peralta, a newcomer to the fictional town of Springfield. She left the role in July 2008 after the birth of her son, Jake. In 2009, she had a supporting role on Law & Order: Special Victims Unit in the episode "Snatched" where she played Liz Rinaldi. In 2010, she had a supporting role in the film Salt, starring Angelina Jolie, and played the female lead role alongside Robert Englund in the independent film Inkubus.

== Personal life ==
Smith became a mother to a son named Jake on July 8, 2008.
