= Loosies =

- Loosies theatrical poster
- Directed by: Michael Corrente
- Written by: Peter Facinelli
- Produced by: Peter Facinelli; Chad A. Verdi; Gino Pereira; Anthony Gudas
- Starring: Peter Facinelli; Jaimie Alexander; Michael Madsen; Joe Pantoliano; William Forsythe; Christy Carlson Romano; Glenn Ciano; Vincent Gallo; Chad A. Verdi
- Edited by: Daniel Boneville
- Music by: Chad Fischer
- Production companies: IFC Films; Verdi Productions; Facinelli Films
- Release date: January 11, 2012
- Running time: 89 minutes
- Country: United States
- Language: English
- Box office: $425,378

Loosies (also known as Love Is Not a Crime and Pick Pocket) is a 2012 romantic comedy-drama film written and produced by Peter Facinelli, and directed by Michael Corrente. The film stars Peter Facinelli, Jaimie Alexander, Michael Madsen, Joe Pantoliano, William Forsythe, Christy Carlson Romano, Glenn Ciano, Vincent Gallo and Chad A. Verdi.

== Synopsis ==
Bobby Corelli (Facinelli), a New York pickpocket, enjoys the free lifestyle he has until one day he is confronted by a former one-night stand, Lucy Atwood (Alexander), who informs him she is three months pregnant with his child. She gives him a chance to leave his daily life and take responsibility for his child. Bobby and Lucy work together to solve their problems while evading the cop (Michael Madsen) whose badge was nicked by Bobby.

== Cast ==
- Peter Facinelli as Bobby Corelli
- Jaimie Alexander as Lucy Atwood
- Michael Madsen as Lieutenant Nick Sullivan
- Vincent Gallo as "Jax"
- William Forsythe as Captain Tom Edwards
- Christy Carlson Romano as Carmen
- Marianne Leone as Rita Corelli
- Joe Pantoliano as Carl
- Glenn Ciano as Gomer
- Eric Phillips as Donny
- Tom DeNucci as Detective Jeffrey
- Tom Paolino as Detective Verdi
- Ara Boghigian as Officer
- Johnny Cicco as Adam, The Stoner
- Benny Salerno as Man On Subway
- Darin Berry as Man On Subway #2
- Tyler and Travis Atwood as Mickey / Mikey
- David Goggin as NYPD Officer

== Production ==
The film was shot on location in Providence, Rhode Island, and New York.

== Release ==
The film was limited released on November 2, 2011, and wide released on January 11, 2012 and finally released on the DVD on March 13, 2012. The film was rated PG-13 by Motion Picture Association of America for some sexual content, violence and language used in the film.

== International distribution ==
The International distribution rights of 'Loosies' a.k.a. 'Pick Pocket' are being licensed by Cinema Management Group.

== Reception ==
=== Box office ===
Loosies has grossed $3,519 in North America, and $421,859 in other territories, for a worldwide total of $425,378.

=== Critical response ===
On review aggregator website Rotten Tomatoes, the film holds an approval rating of 22%, based on 18 reviews, and an average rating of 3.8/10. On Metacritic, the film has a weighted average score of 35 out of 100, based on 11 critics, indicating "generally unfavorable" reviews.
