= Glenn Ciano =

American film director

Glenn Ciano (born December 11, 1974) is a director, writer, and producer. His works include Homie Spumoni, Loosies, Inkubus and Infected.

== Early life ==
Ciano was born in Johnston, Rhode Island.

== Career ==
Ciano began his motion picture career at the age of nineteen, working in various areas of production on Grind, Palookaville, Wishful Thinking, American Buffalo, and Outside Providence. Ciano made his directorial debut with his film Inkubus starring Robert Englund and William Forsythe. He has gone on to direct Infected starring Michael Madsen and Christy Carlson Romano.
