= Anja Savcic =

Canadian actress

- Born: November 27, 1992 (age 33); Sarajevo, Bosnia
- Occupation: Actress
- Years active: 2007–present
- Spouse: Jeremy Laurie (m. 2026)

Anja Savcic ([ˈânːja ˈsɔvtɪt]; born 27 November 1992) is a Canadian actress of Bosnian Serb descent, known for her roles in Loudermilk, Big Sky, Ricky Stanicky, and Nancy Drew.

== Early life ==
Savcic was born in Sarajevo, Bosnia, moved to Canada as a child, and graduated from Simon Fraser University (SFU) in Vancouver. In an interview on the podcast Remembering Yugoslavia, Savčić stated that she is three-quarters Serbian and one-quarter Croatian.

== Career ==
Savcic started her career in 2007 and has acted in 38 film and television projects. She is known for her lead role as Claire Wilkes on Peter Farrelly's comedy series, Loudermilk, a role which she was nominated for a Leo Award in the Best Performer of Host-Music, Comedy or Variety Series category and an ACTRA Award nomination for Best Lead Performance, Female.

Savcic was a series regular in the ABC crime drama series Big Sky in the role of Scarlet Leyendecker, which earned her a 2021 Satellite Award nomination for Best Supporting Actress.

She appeared in the 2024 comedy Ricky Stanicky.

== Filmography ==
=== Short film ===
Year	Title	Director	Writer	Producer	Role	Ref.
2013	Detention	No	No	No	Amanda	
2018	Blackout	No	Yes	Yes	Emilia	
2022	Bottled Up	No	No	Yes		

=== Film ===
Year	Title	Role	Notes
2009	I Love You, Beth Cooper	Victoria Smeltzer	
2010	Transparency	Anja	
2010	Repeaters	Michelle	
2011	Sisters & Brothers	Sarah's School Friend	
2014	Extraterrestrial	Lex	
2015	Life	Barbara Glenn	Uncredited
2017	Incontrol	Samantha	
2017	Crash Pad	Peggy the Pony Snuggler	
2021	Be Still	Kitty Carter	
2024	Ricky Stanicky	Susan	

=== Television ===
Year	Title	Role	Notes
2007	Bionic Woman	MK	Episode: "The List"
2009; 15	Supernatural	Paris Hilton Fan #2, Reese	2 episodes
2010	Fringe	Amanda Walsh	Episode: "Marionette"
2011	Deck The Halls	Nicole Parma	TV film
2013	Beast of the Alamo	Brooke	TV film
2014	Paper Angels	Cassie Bale	TV film
2014	The Flash	Young Mother	Episode: "Flash vs. Arrow"
2014–15	Strange Empire	Mary Collacut	Recurring role
2015	iZombie	Emily Sparrow	Episode: "Maternity Liv"
2015	Motive	Tyler Carver	Episode: "Best Enemies"
2015	Exposed	Tali	TV film
2015	Tales From the Darkside	Madeline	TV film
2016	The X-Files	Girl	Episode: "Founder's Mutation"
2016	Under Fire	Angela Muir	TV film
2016	Frequency	Larissa Abbott	Episode: "Interference"
2017–20	Loudermilk	Claire Wilkes	Main role
2018	Dirk Gently's Holistic Detective Agency	Litzibitz Trost	3 episodes
2018	The Magicians	Skye	3 episodes
2018	Sacred Lies	Olivia Bly	3 episodes
2019	Escaping the Madhouse: The Nellie Bly Story	Lottie	TV film
2021	Nancy Drew	Odette Lamar	Recurring role
2021–22	Big Sky	Scarlet Leyendecker	Recurring role (season 1), main role (season 2)
2021	The Now	Mugger	Episode: "Why Does This Ice Stink?"
2023	Ms. Match	Athena	TV film, lead role
2023	Creepshow	Angela	Episode: "Something Borrowed, Something Blue"
2024	Family Law	Isabelle Rousseau	6 episodes
2024	Tracker	Kira Stine	Episode: "Springland"
2025	Upload	AI Girl	3 episodes
2025	Murder in a Small Town	Denise Wheeler	Episode: "Acts of Murder"
2025	Watson	Francine Wright	Episode: "Happy When It Rains"
