= AP Bio =

AP Bio may refer to:

- A.P. Bio, an American comedy television series created by Mike O'Brien for NBC
- AP Biology, an Advanced Placement biology course and exam offered by the College Board in the United States
