= SuperKnova =

American singer and activist

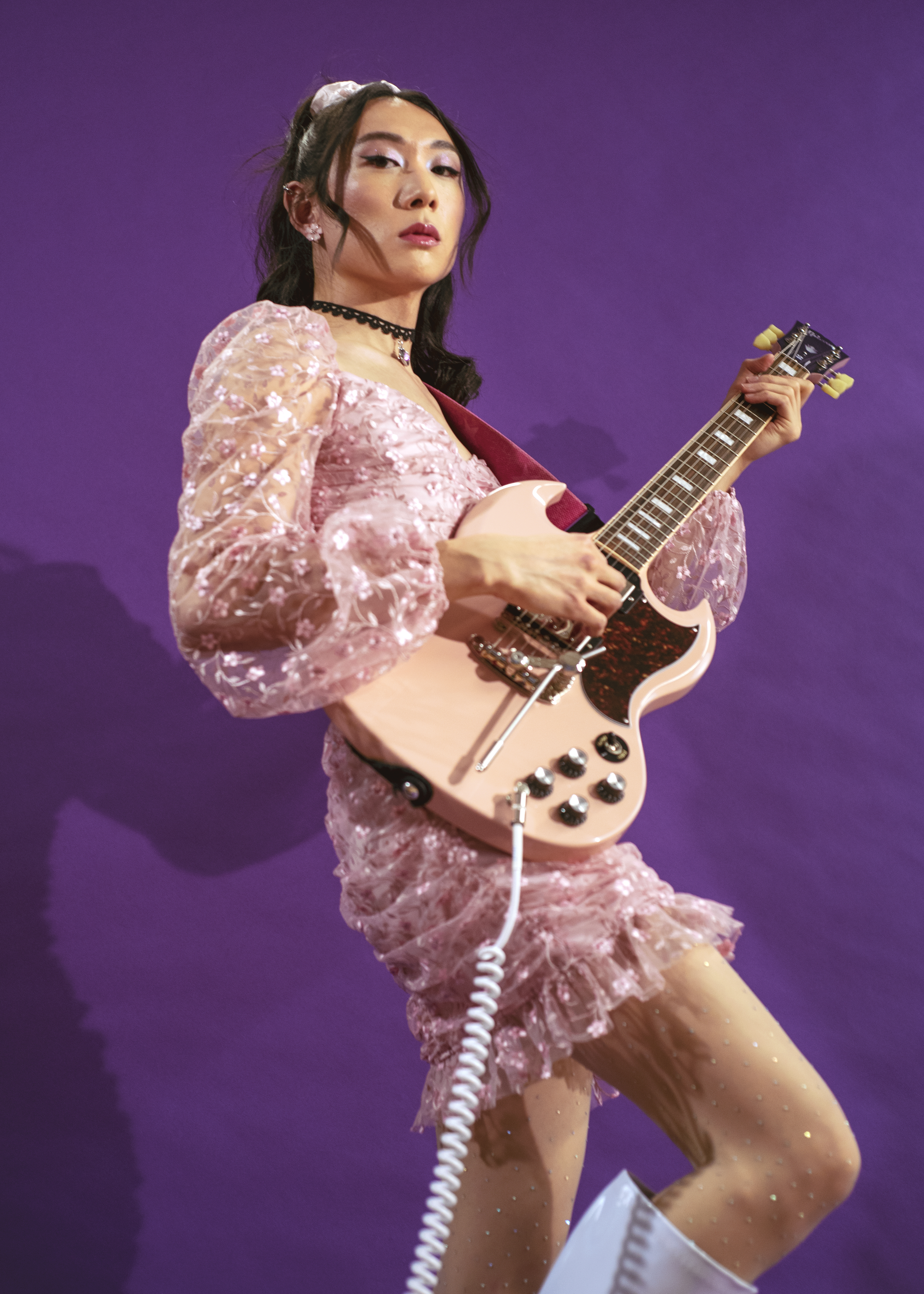
- SuperKnova on the set of her Goals_ music video in 2021

Background information
- Also known as: Ellie Kim
- Origin: Chicago, Illinois
- Genres: Indie pop; Queer pop
- Occupations: Musician; Producer; Recording Engineer; Mixing Engineer; Mastering Engineer
- Instruments: Vocals; Guitar; Piano; Drums; Synthesizer
- Years active: 2017–present
- Label: Self-released
- Website: superknovaofficial.com

Ellie Kim, artist name SuperKnova, is a singer, activist, physician and musician. She has released two studio albums, American Queers and, most recently, superuniverse. She is noted for speaking out publicly against non-consensual intersex surgery in infants while working at Lurie Children's Hospital in Chicago, Illinois.

== Education ==
Kim attended the University of Illinois Urbana-Champaign where she studied jazz guitar. She attended Northwestern University's Feinberg School of Medicine and graduated with her MD. She did not attend residency and instead chose to pursue a career in music after graduating.

== Music career ==
Ellie Kim started SuperKnova while in medical school. During this time, she began her gender transition and wrote songs as a form of therapy to process her emotions around coming out. She initially did not plan on releasing them. However, a friend eventually convinced her to put them on Bandcamp. Her first album Splendor Dysphoria was released on Bandcamp in June 2017. She chose the artist name SuperKnova based on her childhood fascination with space. The name is based on the cosmological phenomenon of a supernova, the final most energetic explosion before the death of a star. She saw this as an analogy of how she wanted to live life: giving it her all and seeing beauty in the chaos. Her second album American Queers is one of the “all-time best selling transgender albums” on Bandcamp.

== Production ==
Kim is a singer, multi-instrumentalist, producer and audio engineer. She writes, produces, records, mixes and masters all of her own music.

== Activism ==
As a physician, Kim has advocated for intersex justice alongside activist Pidgeon Pagonis. On July 23, 2020, Kim became the first physician at Lurie Children's Hospital to publicly speak out against cosmetic, medically unnecessary surgeries performed on intersex infants without their consent. She advocated for change within Lurie Children's Hospital in collaboration with Robert Garofalo, division head of Adolescent Medicine. On July 29, 2020, Lurie Children's hospital formally changed their policy regarding intersex infant surgery and became the first hospital in the United States to do so.

== Personal life ==
Kim is a genderfluid, transgender woman and uses she/her/hers pronouns.

== Appearances in media ==
SuperKnova's song "Glitter and Blood" appears in Season 1, Episode 2 of Showtime's Work in Progress. She also sings a cover of The Beat's "Mirror in the Bathroom" (produced by Ethan Stoller) that appears in Season 1, Episode 4, the "Bathroom" episode.

In 2023, beauty retailer Sephora added SuperKnova to their Sephora Sounds artist roster, a music collective that "reflects the authenticity of Sephora's broader beauty community". She was one of three artists to be featured on their TikTok page alongside the announcement of the program.

== Awards ==
In 2021, SuperKnova's music video for her song "Goals_" was selected to the 44th Asian American International Film Festival in New York City.

In 2023, SuperKnova's music video for her song "Islands" was selected to the 46th Asian American International Film Festival in New York City.
