= Lyric Lewis =

American actress

- Born: May 14, 1985 (age 41); New Orleans, Louisiana
- Occupation: Actress
- Years active: 2009–present

Lyric Lewis is an American actress. She is best known for playing Stef Duncan in the sitcom A.P. Bio and for voicing Sky in the animated series Curses.

== Early life ==
Lewis was born in New Orleans, Louisiana on May 14, 1985. She moved to St Paul, Minnesota at a young age. Her mother signed her up for musicals and she toured with her local theatre group. She is a graduate of Syracuse University.

== Career ==
After first arriving in Hollywood she auditioned for The Groundlings. Early on in her career she appeared in the CBS Diversity Sketch Comedy Showcase as well as the comedy drama series Baskets. She has said her various roles in the reboot of Mad TV opened a lot of doors for her. Her first big role was playing Stef Duncan in the sitcom A.P. Bio She also had a recurring role voicing Sky in the animated series Curses.

== Personal life ==
Her comedic influences growing up were Mo'Nique and Kim Wayans

== Filmography ==
=== Film ===
Year	Title	Role	Notes
2009	Nobody	Diner Patron	
2011	00:24	BBQ Goer#1	
2012	Sidetracked	Fan	Short
2013	Rock	Lyric	Short
2014	Harassment	Sandy	
2014	True Colors	Waitress	Short
2015	The Disgustings: Save the Date	Girl on Date	Short
2015	Netflix	Woman	
2015	I Survived 30 PSA	Spokeswoman	
2017	Girlfriend's Day	Cardie#1	
2017	Jalen Vs. Everybody	Linda	
2017	Billz	Chanel	Short
2017	SEXDOTCOM	Interviewee	
2018	30 Nights	Stacy	
2018	Computer Networking	Player	
2018	Take One	Tanya Jones	Short
2019	Anchors Away	Woman	
2025	I Am a Gigantosaurus, Actually	Anna	

=== Television ===
Year	Title	Role	Notes
2015	The Brat Cave	Fern	Episode; TV Party!
2015	Brooklyn Nine-Nine	Alice	Episode; Johnny and Dora
2015	Shaded	Black Girlfriend	Episode; West Bank Wife Swap
2016	Gay Skit Happens	Woman	2 episodes
2016	Mad TV	Various	8 episodes
2017	Throwing Shade	Janet Willis	Episode; #1.1
2017	SuperMansion	Special Guest	Episode; Blazarmageddon
2017	Flip The Script	The Boom Op	Episode; Diva Director
2018	The News Tank	Liberty Loomis	Episode; Drugs, Octopuses, Octopuses ON drugs, and Coffins!
2017–2019	Baskets	Monica	5 episodes
2020	Outmatched	Miss Tremblay	7 episodes
2020	Robbie	Danielle	Episode; Robbie vs. Ava vs. Danielle
2020	Royalties	Kimmys Agent	Episode; Kick Your Shoes Off
2021	Waffles + Mochi	Baker	Episode; Tomato
2021	iCarly	Maeve	3 episodes
2018	A.P. Bio	Stef Duncan	42 episodes
2022	Waffles + Mochi's Restaurant	Baker	Episode; Spicy
2023	Party Down	Sloan	Episode; Once Upon a Time 'Proms Away' Prom-otional Event
2023	Night Court	Cynthia	Episode; Ready or Knot
2023–2024	Curses	Sky	20 episodes
2025	Bad Thoughts	Nurse	Episode; Love
2025	The Chit Show	Linda	25 episodes
