= Escaping the Madhouse: The Nellie Bly Story =

2019 television film by Karen Moncrieff

- Written by: Helen Childress
- Directed by: Karen Moncrieff
- Starring: Christina Ricci; Judith Light; Josh Bowman
- Music by: Mario Grigorov
- Original language: English

Production
- Producers: Jonathan Baruch; David Sigal; Michael Tive
- Cinematography: Luc Montpellier
- Editor: John Gurdebeke
- Running time: 88 minutes

Original release
- Network: Lifetime
- Release: 2019

Escaping the Madhouse: The Nellie Bly Story is a Lifetime television film about journalist Nellie Bly, who had herself committed at the Women's Lunatic Asylum on Blackwell's Island (now called Roosevelt Island) to expose the abuses occurring at the facility.

== Plot synopsis ==
After being found wandering the streets of New York City with no memory of anything but her name, Nellie Brown is committed at the Women's Lunatic Asylum on Blackwell's Island in 1887. The Asylum runs multiple newspaper ads to find someone who knew Nellie, but they have no luck; one man comes forward stating she may be his wife, but after meeting Nellie, the man states that she is the wrong woman. Nellie, who remembered a memory while meeting with the man, begs Dr. Josiah, the asylum's psychiatrist, to let her go to New York City to see if she can remember anything else, but Dr. Josiah states she must stay at the asylum until her memories return.

Nellie undergoes brutal treatment at the hands of the nurses, who are overseen by Matron Grady. Nellie befriends new patient Lottie, who has been separated from her newborn baby and struggles with grief due to the separation. Lottie is shocked that they can keep Nellie just for losing her memories, so Nellie, along with fellow patients Tilly and Demarus, explain to her why various patients are being held; Demarus was a chambermaid who spent all of her money, Tilly implies that she was sent to the asylum for being a sex worker, Johanna only speaks Swahili, and Rosa only speaks Spanish.

Nellie attempts to report the abuses to Dr. Josiah, such as beatings and an attempted drowning, but he tells her not to listen to the other patients. She tries to convince him that most of the women aren't mentally ill, but to no avail. However, when Nellie later reports to Dr. Josiah that they are forbidden from using the public furniture by Matron Grady, he believes her and allows the patients to use a rocking chair; the patients are at first scared of retribution, but then take turns using the chair. Matron Grady confronts Dr. Josiah, and the patients begin to cower in fear. He watches as Matron Grady has the nurses forcibly send the patients to "The Farm" to move rocks from a pile on one side of the field to the other.

While the patients use the rocking chair, Nellie sneaks off and begins searching in Matron Grady's office. She finds a book, and when a nurse named Nurse Fenton confronts her, she insists that the book is hers. She begs Nurse Fenton not to tell, and both disclose that they are terrified of "The Retreat." She takes a baby blanket belonging to Lottie and gives it back to her.

Nellie shows her book to Dr. Josiah; it is her journal, which details the reasons why various patients have been institutionalized and the abuses they have suffered. Dr. Josiah dismisses Nellie, who joins the other patients as they are lectured by Matron Grady. A patient steals Lottie's blanket, and Matron Grady threatens to send her to The Retreat for stealing. Nellie tells Matron Grady that she stole the blanket; Matron Grady lectures her for trying to make decisions for the patients like the doctor, accuses her of lusting after Dr. Josiah, and has her treated with leeches. Dr. Josiah tries to talk to her the next day, but Nellie tried to end the conversation so the nurses wouldn't get Matron Grady.

During dinner, Lottie experiences a mental break and begins rocking and shaking her head no, even while she is threatened with a whip. In an attempt to save Lottie, Nellie tells the other patients to lock arms and rock while chanting, "The retreat!" As punishment, Matron Grady says there has been a lice infestation causing the patient's behavior, and she announces that the patients will have their hair sheared off, starting with Nellie. Dr. Josiah walks in just before her hair is cut. Matron Grady implies that he is sexually attracted to Nellie. He insists they have kerosene rubbed on their scalps to kill the lice. Lottie laughs hysterically as the kerosene is applied, so kerosene is dumped all over her. She then steals Matron Grady's pipe, screams at Nellie and blames her for her suffering, then dumps the hot ashes on her hair. Matron Grady does not allow the staff to intervene and holds Nellie back so she cannot help, and Lottie burns to death.

A man named Bartholomew Driscoll, or Bats for short, arrives at the asylum and claims to be in a relationship with a woman named Nellie Bly, who went missing shortly before Nellie Brown was taken to the asylum. He describes Nellie Bly, whom Dr. Josiah realizes is indeed Nellie Brown, but he tells Bats that Nellie was discharged the day before. Bartholomew reveals that Nellie Bly is an investigative journalist. Nellie sees Bats leaving and tries to follow him and call out to him, but he leaves the asylum before she can reach him. She confronts Dr. Josiah, who claims that Bats is a friend who came to visit him. Dr. Josiah accuses Nellie of lusting after him, and Nellie insists that her journal is proof she was sane when she arrived and the treatment made her lose her memory. She demands to know all of the treatment she has received, but Dr. Josiah sends her away.

Nurse Fenton attempts to help Nellie to escape, but when they realize the boat is gone, Nurse Fenton pretends to have caught Nellie. Dr. Josiah tries to prevent Matron Grady from disciplining Nellie, but Matron Grady reveals that she learned that Dr. Josiah was fired from his position in a prestigious asylum in Britain because he took a "special interest" in a patient. Nellie realizes that Dr. Josiah lied about Bats and demands the truth. Nellie's memory returns, and she realizes that she is Nellie Bly and Matron Grady drowned her almost to the point of death to cause memory loss due to lack of oxygen to the brain.

Bats receives a letter that Nellie sent before she went undercover. He confronts Joseph Pulitzer, who hired Nellie to investigate the asylum demanding Pulitzer tell him what happened to Nellie. He then returns to the asylum, and Nurse Fenton leads him to The Retreat, where Matron Grady is drowning Nellie to erase her memory again. As Nellie leaves the asylum, she is given her journal back. She tells Bats that she won't need her notes because she will never forget "the eternity" she spent there, to which Bats reveals she has only been in the asylum for ten days.

The film ends by showing police arriving at Blackwell's Island, alongside newspaper articles detailing the investigation into the asylum. Nellie publishes a book called Ten Days in a Mad-House. The epilogue reveals that Nellie's work led to sweeping mental health reform, including the closing of the Women's Lunatic Asylum. Nellie continued to work as a journalist until her death in 1922. In 1998, Nellie was inducted into the National Women's Hall of Fame under her actual name, Elizabeth Jane Cochrane, as "Nellie Bly" is a pen name.

== Cast ==
- Christina Ricci as Nellie Bly
- Judith Light as Matron Grady
- Josh Bowman as Dr. Josiah
- Anja Savcic as Lottie Hollister
- Mark Hildreth as Bartholomew "Bats" Driscoll
- Nikki Duvall as Nurse Fenton
