= Abby McEnany =

American comedian (born 1968)

- Born: 1968 (age 57–58)
- Education: University of Chicago

Comedy career
- Years active: 1990–present
- Medium: Television; theater
- Genre: Improvisational comedy

Abby McEnany (born 1968) is an American writer, comedian, and actress known for the television series Work in Progress.

== Early life ==
McEnany mostly grew up between the cities of Boston, Providence, and Columbus. McEnany's father was a cardiovascular surgeon, which caused her family to move to San Francisco for his job in 1982. She lived there for four years while she was in high school. McEnany moved to Chicago for college in 1986, where she attended the University of Chicago, graduating in 1992.

== Career ==
McEnany enrolled at Second City in Chicago in the 1990s, where she had Stephen Colbert as a teacher.

McEnany worked for Morningstar, Inc. in Chicago for 10 years, first in customer service and then as a technical writer. She eventually joined Second City's touring company when she was 40, and led the ensemble "Judo Intellectuals" at the Chicago's Playground Theater.

== Personal life ==
McEnany used to identify as a lesbian, but now refers to herself as a "queer dyke". She lives with OCD and depression. McEnany grew up in the Episcopal Church, but does not consider herself religious.

== Filmography ==
=== Television ===
Year	Title	Role
2013	Roomies	Sue Fox
2019–2021	Work in Progress	Abby
2023	And Just Like That...	BD
2024–present	Tracker	Velma Bruin
