= Transparency (film) =

- Film poster
- Directed by: Raul Inglis
- Written by: Raul Inglis
- Produced by: Matt Kelly
- Starring: Lou Diamond Phillips; Estella Warren; Deborah Kara Unger
- Cinematography: Michael C. Blundell
- Edited by: Richard Martin
- Music by: Christopher Nickel
- Production company: Matt Kelly Films
- Distributed by: Entertainment One; Lionsgate
- Release date: April 16, 2010 (DIFF)
- Running time: 100 minutes
- Country: Canada
- Language: English
- Budget: $2 million

Transparency (known as Takedown in Europe) is a 2010 action film written and directed by Raul Inglis. It won Inglis the Best Director title at the 2011 Leo awards.

== Plot ==
The film focuses on a man who failed to save his daughter from a vicious attack. He works as a security guard, uncovering more than he bargained for and finding himself in the dark world of human trafficking.

== Cast ==
- Lou Diamond Phillips as David
- Estella Warren as Monika
- Deborah Kara Unger as Danielle
- Aaron Pearl as Reg
- Jordana Largy as Sam
- Anja Savcic as Anja
- Kendall Cross as Billie
- Michael Kopsa as Dale
- Jonathan Walker as Lubitsch
- Emma Lahana as Alex
- Dariya Parakhnevych as Vika
- Vitaly Kravchenko as Pavel
