= Ricky Stanicky =

2024 comedy film directed by Peter Farrelly

- Release poster
- Directed by: Peter Farrelly
- Screenplay by: Jeff Bushell; Brian Jarvis; James Lee Freeman; Peter Farrelly; Pete Jones; Mike Cerrone
- Story by: David Occhino; Jason Decker
- Produced by: Paul Currie; Thorsten Schumacher; John Jacobs; Michael De Luca
- Starring: Zac Efron; Jermaine Fowler; Andrew Santino; Lex Scott Davis; Anja Savcic; Jeff Ross; William H. Macy; John Cena
- Cinematography: John Brawley
- Edited by: Patrick J. Don Vito
- Music by: Dave Palmer
- Production companies: Footloose Productions; Rocket Science; VicScreen; Smart Entertainment; Blue Rider Media; Bright White Light
- Distributed by: Amazon MGM Studios
- Release date: 7 March 2024
- Running time: 114 minutes
- Countries: Australia; United Kingdom; United States
- Language: English
- Budget: $49.7 million

Ricky Stanicky is a 2024 comedy film co-written and directed by Peter Farrelly. The film stars Zac Efron, Jermaine Fowler, Andrew Santino, Lex Scott Davis, Anja Savcic, Jeff Ross, William H. Macy, and John Cena.

The story follows a group of childhood friends who, after inventing a fictional person named Ricky Stanicky to escape trouble, continue using the fake identity into adulthood. When their families begin to question Ricky's existence, they hire an eccentric actor to impersonate him, resulting in unexpected consequences.

Ricky Stanicky was released in the United States on March 7, 2024, by Amazon MGM Studios through its streaming platform, Prime Video. The film received mixed reviews from critics.

== Plot ==
As children, Dean, Wes, and JT pull a Halloween prank by lighting a bag of dog feces on a neighbor’s porch, accidentally setting fire to a nearby scarecrow. To avoid blame, Dean writes the name "Ricky Stanicky"—an imaginary out-of-town kid—on a discarded costume piece. The police believe Ricky is responsible, and the trio begin using the fake identity to get out of trouble.

Twenty years later, the three men still use Ricky Stanicky as a scapegoat for personal and professional obligations. JT is preparing for the birth of his child with his wife Susan, and Dean is in a relationship with Erin. Claiming Ricky has relapsed with testicular cancer and is alone in Albany, New York, "Ricky" (really Wes, impersonating him via a call) prompts the men to "visit" him. In reality, they take a vacation to see musician Marc Rebillet in Atlantic City, New Jersey while telling their partners they are supporting their sick friend. They switch off their phones and continue documenting fictional events in the "Ricky Stanicky Bible."

In Atlantic City, they encounter Rod Rimestead, an eccentric actor and adult parody singer. When Susan goes into premature labor, the men rush home but miss the birth. At the hospital, Leona, JT’s mother-in-law, grows suspicious that Ricky doesn’t exist. Wes nearly confesses, but Dean insists Ricky is real and recently celebrated five years cancer-free. Leona then insists Ricky attend the baby’s bris.

To maintain the lie, Dean hires Rod to impersonate Ricky Stanicky at the bris. Desperate for work, and to avoid suspicious characters looking for him, he agrees, during which he self-detoxes from the alcohol in his system. Rod quickly wins over the guests with his charm, impressing Leona, Erin’s cousin Carly, and the trio’s boss, Ted Summerhayes. Rod even meets with Keith, who accuses Wes of being lazy and wants to end things until Rod mentions Wes was spending his time writing children's novels. When Rod claims to know Carly’s ex-boyfriend, Gary Polisner, the group attempts to drug him with ketamine, but the rabbi mistakenly ingests it, and learned that Rod never met Gary in person but via commercials. During the circumcision, the sedated rabbi falters, leaving the job unfinished. Rod, as Ricky, completes the procedure using a cigar cutter, which earns him admiration from all present.

Impressed by Ricky’s charisma, Summerhayes offers him a job leading a major merger with World River, a San Francisco-based company. Rod manages to win over Ted and points out his known habit of shaking his fists "(air-dicking)" while giving speeches. As a result, Ted put Rod in charge of the merger. Erin, meanwhile, begins profiling Ricky for a "Hero of the Week" local news segment. Dean becomes increasingly anxious as Rod embraces his new identity, legally changing his name to Richard Barbara Stanicky and hiring Wes as his assistant. When Dean confronts him, Rod says he’s grateful for the second chance and doesn’t want to give it up.

Before a company event celebrating the merger, Erin reveals to Dean that she knows Ricky is actually Rod Rimestead. Summerhayes introduces Dean to speak before the screening of the "Hero of the Week" segment. Dean publicly admits Ricky is fictional, confesses to the decades-long lie, and walks out.

As the segment airs, Rod recounts how meeting Dean and reading the Ricky Stanicky Bible inspired him to become a better person. Just as Summerhayes prepares to fire Dean, World River executives arrive and enthusiastically endorse Ricky’s leadership, impressed by his supposed character and creativity. Summerhayes asks Dean to stay on, and they reconcile. Ricky is then confronted by the two men he evaded in Atlantic City. They reveal themselves to be representatives of Billy Idol issuing a cease-and-desist order against parodying his music.

Following the revelation, JT is forced by Susan to camp out in the backyard for six months. Erin, still hurt by the deception, initially lied to Dean about the Ricky story but instead made the segment about Rod’s transformation into Ricky after seeing him at Summerhayes. Dean asks for forgiveness, and Rod shares a secret audio recording of Dean expressing his love and appreciation for Erin, which softens her stance.

At a closing party, Rod announces that he is engaged to Carly, who has donated much of her long hair, and that the group will spend their weekend volunteering for an environmental cleanup—now as genuine friends, with no lies involved. Wes even starts publishing children's books, while sending out a montage of Summerhayes's air-dicking.

== Cast ==
- Zac Efron as Dean, one of the three friends who created the "Ricky Stanicky" persona
- Jermaine Fowler as Wes, one of the three friends who created the "Ricky Stanicky" persona
- Andrew Santino as JT, one of the three friends who created the "Ricky Stanicky" persona
- John Cena as Rodney "Rock Hard Rod" Rimestead / Ricky Stanicky, a New Jersey-based parody singer and actor hired to portray "Ricky Stanicky"
- Lex Scott Davis as Erin, Dean's girlfriend and a news journalist
- Anja Savcic as Susan, JT's wife
- Jeff Ross as Rabbi Greenberg, the rabbi hired to perform Whitaker's bris
- William H. Macy as Ted Summerhayes, Dean and JT's boss
- Apple Farrelly as Carly, Erin's cousin with extremely long hair whom Rod takes a liking to
- Nathan Jones as Big Ben, a lawyer representing Billy Idol
- Debra Lawrance as Mrs. Levine
- Heather Mitchell as Leona, Susan's mother
- Daniel Monks as Keith, Wes's boyfriend
- Jane Badler as Miriam Summerhayes, Ted Summerhayes's wife
- Jackson Tozer as Gary Polisner, Carly's ex-boyfriend who is a successful commercial actor
- Marta Kaczmarek as Mimi Jacobs
- Ryan Shelton as Phillip
- Jim Knobeloch as Billings
- Zen Gesner as World River executive
- Kate Lister as World River executive #2

Additionally, Marc Rebillet and Stan Grant appear as themselves.

== Production ==
=== Development ===
In May 2010, it was reported that James Franco was attached to star in Ricky Stanicky, with a screenplay by David Occhino, Jason Decker, and Jeffrey Bushell. Summit Entertainment was in talks to finance the project, with Michael De Luca and John Jacobs set to produce.

Bushell's screenplay was included on the 2010 Black List of the best unproduced scripts in Hollywood.

In 2012, after Franco exited the project, the lead role was briefly considered by Joaquin Phoenix, according to The Hollywood Reporter.

By April 2013, it was announced that Jim Carrey had signed on for the title role after about a year of consideration. Steve Oedekerk was attached to direct, and he collaborated with Bushell on a new draft of the script. De Luca and Jacobs remained as producers.

=== Pre-production ===
In September 2022, it was reported that Peter Farrelly would direct Ricky Stanicky, with filming expected to begin in early 2023. Farrelly was also reported to be in talks with Zac Efron and John Cena to star.

The screenplay was written by Farrelly, Brian Jarvis, and James L. Freeman, based on an original spec script by Jeffrey Bushell and Steve Oedekerk.

In February 2023, it was announced that Amazon had acquired worldwide distribution rights to the film, with Efron, Cena, and Jermaine Fowler confirmed to star.

On February 7, 2023, it was reported that William H. Macy, Anja Savcic, Andrew Santino, and Lex Scott Davis had joined the cast.

The film was produced by Paul Currie of Footloose Productions, Michael De Luca of Michael De Luca Productions, Thorsten Schumacher of Rocket Science, and John Jacobs of Smart Entertainment.

=== Filming ===
Principal photography began in February 2023 in Melbourne, Victoria, with the city serving as a stand-in for Providence, Rhode Island, where the film is set.

Filming took place throughout February and March, with production utilizing various urban and suburban locations across Melbourne to replicate American streetscapes and neighborhoods. The production also included studio work and set builds to complement the location shooting.

The film received financial support through Australia's Location Incentive program, administered by the Australian Government, as well as the Victorian Screen Incentive, supported by the state agency VicScreen.

== Release ==
Ricky Stanicky was released by Amazon MGM Studios via its streaming platform Prime Video on March 7, 2024.

The film was part of Amazon's broader strategy to bolster its original comedy offerings in 2024. Prime Video's lineup for the year included a mix of new action series, comedy films, and season renewals, aiming to cater to a diverse audience and strengthen its position in the streaming market.

In addition to traditional promotional efforts, the marketing campaign for Ricky Stanicky featured innovative digital activations. A notable example was the creation of a satirical OnlyFans account for the fictional character Ricky Stanicky, which was promoted by actor John Cena on his social media channels. This unconventional approach aimed to generate buzz and engage audiences in a humorous and unexpected way.

Despite the film's moderate critical reception, its release on Prime Video allowed it to reach a broad audience, contributing to discussions around the evolution of comedy in the streaming era.

== Reception ==
Ricky Stanicky received mixed reviews from critics. On Rotten Tomatoes, the film holds an approval rating of 46% based on 85 reviews, with an average rating of 5.2/10. The website's critical consensus reads, "John Cena’s committed performance produces some big laughs, but they aren't enough to console the film’s thin plot and bloated runtime." On Metacritic, it has a weighted average score of 44 out of 100, based on 24 critics, indicating "mixed or average reviews."

Peter Sobczynski of The Guardian described the film as "a mix of boorish swagger and sentimentality typical of Farrelly," praising Cena’s performance but noting "the laughs are a little thin on the ground." The Wall Street Journal commented that Cena "sheds his post-wrestling persona" delivering a surprisingly engaging performance, but described the film as "gleefully vulgar" and prone to "every joke too far."

Conversely, RogerEbert.com called it "juvenile and joyless," criticizing its reliance on "cringe comedy and bottom-shelf punchlines." The Richmond Reviewer described Cena's performance as "career-best" but deemed the film a "mindless Sunday-type watch" rather than laugh-out-loud comedy.

Audience reception was somewhat more favorable; Rotten Tomatoes users gave it a score of approximately 69%, often praising Cena's energy and describing the film as a "cheesy, low-brow but fun watch."
