= The Boss (2016 film) =

- Theatrical release poster
- Directed by: Ben Falcone
- Written by: Melissa McCarthy; Ben Falcone; Steve Mallory
- Produced by: Melissa McCarthy; Ben Falcone; Will Ferrell; Adam McKay; Chris Henchy
- Starring: Melissa McCarthy; Kristen Bell; Kathy Bates; Tyler Labine; Peter Dinklage
- Cinematography: Julio Macat
- Edited by: Craig Alpert
- Music by: Christopher Lennertz
- Production companies: Gary Sanchez Productions; On the Day Productions
- Distributed by: Universal Pictures
- Release dates: March 21, 2016 (Sydney); April 8, 2016 (United States)
- Running time: 99 minutes
- Country: United States
- Language: English
- Budget: $29 million
- Box office: $78.8 million

The Boss is a 2016 American comedy film directed by Ben Falcone and written by Falcone, Melissa McCarthy and Steve Mallory. The film stars McCarthy, Kristen Bell, Ella Anderson, Tyler Labine, Kathy Bates, Annie Mumolo, Timothy Simons, and Peter Dinklage.

The film follows a wealthy woman who, after being arrested and losing her fortune, uses her assistant's daughter's Dandelion Girls cookie sales to return to the top.

The Boss had its premiere in Sydney on March 21, 2016, and was theatrically released in the United States on April 8 by Universal Pictures. Although it received generally negative reviews from critics, it grossed over $78 million worldwide on a budget of $29 million.

== Plot ==
In 1975 in Chicago, a young Michelle Darnell returns to the orphanage she was adopted from. She bounces between the orphanage and other homes within 5–10 years later until her sadness turns into rage and realises that she will succeed on her own.

In the present, Michelle is the CEO of three Fortune 500 companies, guru and best-selling author of self-help books and is the 47th wealthiest woman in the US. After a successful event at the United Center, Michelle and her nemesis/former lover Renault (originally named Ronald) face off about a recent stock deal Michelle made in which she had acquired the stock due to insider trading so is turned into the SEC by Renault as revenge.

Following a disastrous interview with Gayle King, Michelle is arrested for insider trading and sent to prison for five months. Her companies are taken over by Renault and all her assets are seized and frozen by the government. When released, Michelle finds her home foreclosed so seeks out her former assistant Claire, with whom she stays until she gets back on her feet.

After Michelle gets no help from former colleagues she subsequently insults, she is soon inspired by Claire's young daughter Rachel. She sells Dandelion Scout cookies, which the entrepreneur notices the profit the organisation makes a year. Michelle decides to start her own company, "Darnell's Darlings", by selling Claire's homemade brownies, bringing in Claire as a partner.

Recruiting girls from the Dandelions and other students, the Darlings are successful in selling brownies in competition with the Dandelions, which leads to a street fight between the two groups. Michelle, Rachel and Claire grow closer together, with Michelle inspiring Claire to quit her job and go on a date with her former fellow coworker Mike, while growing close to Rachel as the company grows.

Michelle, having brought in her former mentor Ida Marquette as an investor in the company, is spooked at a celebratory dinner when she receives a handmade gift from Rachel who declares the three as a family due to her own personal background of abandonment. Michelle, overwhelmed, distances herself from Rachel and Claire's lives. She begins making big business decisions without Claire's involvement and the two clash after Michelle mistakenly believes that Claire has sold out the company to Renault.

In return, Michelle sells the company to Renault. However, she soon returns to Rachel and Claire, feeling regretful, and apologises, revealing that during her childhood she was abandoned frequently. Michelle decides to work with Claire to get their company back by stealing the contract from Renault's office. Claire's now boyfriend Mike offers to assist.

While Mike distracts the doormen, the two women steal the contract, but are intercepted by Renault. He fights with Michelle, leading to the rooftop where she is seemingly pushed off the roof to her death (actually only falling to the level below). Claire also shoves Renault off. Michelle and Renault, having had a background of being romantically involved, make peace with one another.

A year later, the business achieves great success so Claire and Rachel use their money to purchase a new family home.

== Cast ==
- Melissa McCarthy as Michelle Darnell, a rich and powerful businesswoman, who was abandoned by several different families for an unknown reason, which caused her to have a bitter personality against the idea of having a family. She is arrested by the FBI for insider trading, serves time, and is on parole throughout the film until the end.
  - Chandler Head as 5-year-old Michelle
  - Vivian Falcone (Melissa McCarthy's real-life daughter) as 10-year-old Michelle
  - Isabella Amara as 15-year-old Michelle
- Kristen Bell as Claire Rawlings, Rachel's mother and Michelle's personal assistant and single mom, who at first stops working for her after Michelle's arrest. She creates an empire along with Michelle, by selling homemade brownies Claire bakes.
- Ella Anderson as Rachel Rawlings, Claire's 10-year-old daughter, who was part of a Girl Scout-like team called the Dandelions, but quits after being bullied and chastised by Helen and being convinced to join alongside Michelle in her scheme.
- Peter Dinklage as Ronald/Renault, an unscrupulous business man and rival to Michelle. He holds a long-time grudge towards Michelle due to the fact that they dated in the past, but broke up due to a promotion Michelle got, at which point she revealed her awareness of his attempt to steal her client list, changed her behavior and caused them to break up. He was also responsible for turning Michelle over to the authorities for insider trading. He constantly names himself Renault and follows the lifestyle of a samurai.
- Tyler Labine as Mike Beals, a co-worker of Claire's, who seems to try to woo Claire, who constantly rejects him softly.
- Kathy Bates as Ida Marquette, a former mentor of Michelle's who is the owner of a glue factory. She cut off their alliance after Michelle decided to push Ida away from a deal she made from another company.
- Timothy Simons as Stephan, Ron's gay personal assistant.
- Annie Mumolo as Helen Kreagan, an arrogant, cunning and narcissistic woman and mother to one of the Dandelions, who takes pride in verbally abusing the other girls. She thinks she's better than everyone else and always compliments herself, even going as far to call herself successful when she isn't.
- Kristen Schaal as Sandy, the leader of the Dandelions, who is pompously berated by Helen.
- Cecily Strong as Dana Dandridge, Claire's vain, selfish, sarcastic and overbearing boss, who describes Michelle as one of her "two personal heroes", with the second being Benedict Cumberbatch.
- Cedric Yarbrough as Tito, Michelle's former bodyguard, who constantly cheers along with Michelle.
- Mary Sohn as Jan Keller, a mother to one of the Dandelions.
- Eva Peterson as Chrystal Delvechio, one of the Darnell's Darlings, who often engages in violent behavior.
- Presley Coley as Hannah Kreagan, one of the Dandelions and Helen's daughter, who is manipulated by her mother.
- Aleandra Newcomb as Mariana Gutierrez, one of the Darnell's Darlings.
- Ben Falcone as Marty, Michelle's former lawyer.
- Margo Martindale as Sister Agnes Aluminata, the mother superior of the children's home where Michelle lived.
- Michael McDonald as Bryce Crean, one of the "friends" of Michelle's past.
- Steve Mallory as Carl, one of the "friends" of Michelle's past.
- Larry Dorf as Guard Kenny
- Damon Jones as Waiter
- T-Pain as himself
- Gayle King as herself
- Mitch Silpa as Guard Clemmons (Deleted Scenes)
- Jim Cashman as Guard John (Deleted Scenes)
- Carrot Top as a centaur version of himself in a dream that Michelle had. (Deleted Scenes)
- Dax Shepard as Kyle Marquette, Ida's "son". (Unrated Cut)
- Dave Bautista as Chad, the leader of the Falcon Rangers. (Uncredited/Alternate Ending)

== Production ==
Initially announced as Michelle Darnell, the film is based on a character McCarthy created for the comedy troupe Groundlings. Universal was at first unable to decide on the gender of the film's antagonist. Before Peter Dinklage was finally cast, the studio also considered Oprah Winfrey, Jon Hamm and Sandra Bullock as possibilities. Kathy Bates plays Ida Marquette, Darnell's mentor, and Kristen Bell plays Claire, Darnell's former personal assistant.

=== Filming ===
Set in Chicago, the movie began filming in Chicago on March 12, 2015. In addition to filming in Chicago, the movie was also filmed throughout various locations in the Atlanta, Georgia area, including Agnes Scott College, Crescent Avenue in Midtown, Glenwood Park, and the Buckhead Loop area.

== Release ==
The first official full-length trailer was released on November 19, 2015. The film was released on April 8, 2016.

=== Home media ===
The film was released on Digital HD on July 12, 2016. The unrated Blu-ray and DVD version was released on July 26, 2016.

=== Box office ===
The Boss grossed $63.3 million in the United States and Canada, plus $15.5 million in other territories, for a worldwide total of $78.8 million against a budget of $29 million.

In the United States and Canada, pre-release tracking suggested the film would gross $20–24 million from 3,480 theaters in its opening weekend, besting fellow newcomers Hardcore Henry ($7–10 million projection) and Demolition ($2–3 million projection). The film grossed $985,000 from its early Thursday screenings and $8.1 million on its first day. It went on to gross $23.6 million in its opening weekend, finishing first at the box office.

== Reception ==
=== Critical response ===
The Boss received generally negative reviews from critics. Review aggregation website Rotten Tomatoes gives the film an approval rating of 22%, based on 197 reviews, with an average of 4.40/10. The site's critical consensus reads, "Melissa McCarthy remains as fiercely talented as ever, but her efforts aren't enough to prop up the baggy mess of inconsistent gags and tissue-thin writing that brings down The Boss." On Metacritic, the film has a score of 40 out of 100, based on reviews from 39 critics, indicating "mixed or average reviews". Audiences polled by CinemaScore gave the film an average grade of "C+" on an A+ to F scale.

Manohla Dargis of The New York Times writes: "The movie is funny without being much good; mostly, it’s another rung on Ms. McCarthy’s big ladder up." Justin Chang of Variety magazine calls the film a "sloppy, haphazard comic vehicle" although he does praise McCarthy for doing the most possible to extract laughs from the material.

=== Accolades ===
| Award | Category | Recipient | Result |
|---|---|---|---|
| Golden Trailer Awards | Best Comedy Poster | The Boss | Nominated |
| Alliance of Women Film Journalists | Actress Most in Need of a New Agent | Melissa McCarthy | Nominated |
| Teen Choice Awards | Choice Movie Actress: Comedy | Melissa McCarthy | Nominated |
| People's Choice Awards | Favorite Comedic Movie Actress | Melissa McCarthy | Won |
| People's Choice Awards | Favorite Comedic Movie Actress | Kristen Bell | Nominated |
