= Work in Progress (TV series) =

2019 American sitcom created by Abby McEnany

- Official release poster
- Genre: Comedy
- Created by: Abby McEnany; Tim Mason
- Starring: Abby McEnany; Karin Anglin; Celeste Pechous; Julia Sweeney; Theo Germaine
- Composer: Ethan Stoller
- Country of origin: United States
- Original language: English
- No. of seasons: 2
- No. of episodes: 18

Production
- Executive producers: Abby McEnany; Tim Mason; Lisa Masseur (pilot); Lilly Wachowski; Lawrence Mattis; Josh Adler; Ashley Berns; Julia Sweeney; Tony Hernandez
- Producers: Mckenzi Cohen (pilot); Brian McNeely (pilot); Jacqueline "JJ" Ingram (pilot); John Skidmore
- Production location: Chicago
- Cinematography: Michael Ognisanti
- Editors: Mike Berg; Joseph Jett Sally; Kat Thomas; Bettina Z Treviranus
- Camera setup: Single-camera
- Running time: 23–30 minutes
- Production companies: Tessa Films (pilot); Monday; Squirrel Soup; Circle of Confusion; Jax Media

Original release
- Network: Showtime
- Release: December 8, 2019 – October 10, 2021

Work in Progress is an American comedy-drama television series produced by Showtime that premiered on December 8, 2019. The series was created by Abby McEnany and Tim Mason, written and executive produced by McEnany, Mason, and Lilly Wachowski, and directed by Mason. Work in Progress stars McEnany in a semi-autobiographical role alongside Karin Anglin, Celeste Pechous, Julia Sweeney (as a fictionalized version of herself), and Theo Germaine. The entire series was written, filmed, and post-produced in Chicago.

The pilot episode was shown at the Sundance Film Festival. The first season of Work in Progress, consisting of eight episodes, premiered on Showtime on December 8, 2019. It received positive critical reception.

On January 13, 2020, Showtime renewed the series for a 10-episode second season, to be filmed in Chicago later in the year. The second season premiered on August 22, 2021.

On January 27, 2022, Showtime canceled the series after two seasons.

== Synopsis ==
A self-identified "fat, queer dyke" enters into a transformative relationship during a time of crisis.

== Cast ==
=== Main ===
- Abby McEnany as Abby, a 45-year-old self-identifying "fat, queer dyke" who lives with depression and obsessive-compulsive disorder.
- Karin Anglin as Alison, Abby's sister.
- Celeste Pechous as Campbell, Abby's friend.
- Julia Sweeney as a fictionalized version of herself. A recurring plot point is the discomfort Julia's Saturday Night Live character Pat has caused to Abby, for which Julia attempts to make amends.
- Theo Germaine as Chris, a 22-year-old barista who enters a relationship with Abby. Chris is a trans man. Germaine appears in all episodes of the first season but is credited as a special guest star.

=== Recurring ===
- Gerard Neugent as Mike, Alison's husband.
- Echaka Agba as Melanie, Abby's ex.
- Armand Fields as King, Chris's friend and co-worker.
- Mary Sohn as Susan, Abby's boss

=== Special guests ===
- "Weird Al" Yankovic as a fictionalized version of himself, playing Julia's husband.

== Episodes ==
=== Series overview ===
| Season | Episodes | Originally released | |
| Season | Episodes | First released | Last released |
|---|---|---|---|
| 1 | 8 | December 8, 2019 | January 26, 2020 |
| 2 | 10 | August 22, 2021 | October 10, 2021 |

=== Season 1 (2019–20) ===
| No. overall | No. in season | Title | Directed by | Written by | Original release date | U.S. viewers (millions) |
|---|---|---|---|---|---|---|
| 1 | 1 | "180 Almonds" | Tim Mason | Abby McEnany & Tim Mason | December 8, 2019 | 0.134 |
| 2 | 2 | "176, 172, 171" | Tim Mason | Abby McEnany & Tim Mason & Lilly Wachowski | December 15, 2019 | 0.131 |
| 3 | 3 | "162" | Tim Mason | Abby McEnany & Tim Mason & Lilly Wachowski | December 22, 2019 | 0.067 |
| 4 | 4 | "161, 153, 137, 122, 106, 104, 102 (We're Still Counting Almonds.)" | Tim Mason | Abby McEnany & Tim Mason & Lilly Wachowski | December 29, 2019 | 0.094 |
| 5 | 5 | "66, 65, 64, 62" | Tim Mason | Abby McEnany & Tim Mason & Lilly Wachowski | January 5, 2020 | 0.110 |
| 6 | 6 | "15, 14 (pt. 1)" | Tim Mason | Abby McEnany & Tim Mason & Lilly Wachowski | January 12, 2020 | 0.085 |
| 7 | 7 | "14 (pt. 2), 12, 11, 10" | Tim Mason | Abby McEnany & Tim Mason & Lilly Wachowski | January 19, 2020 | 0.100 |
| 8 | 8 | "3, 2, 1" | Tim Mason | Abby McEnany & Tim Mason & Lilly Wachowski | January 26, 2020 | 0.083 |

=== Season 2 (2021) ===
| No. overall | No. in season | Title | Directed by | Written by | Original release date | U.S. viewers (millions) |
|---|---|---|---|---|---|---|
| 9 | 1 | "Life Got In The Way" | Blythe Haaga | Lilly Wachowski & Abby McEnany | August 22, 2021 | 0.067 |
| 10 | 2 | "Everything’s Fine, Everything’s Okay" | Thembi Banks | Amanda Blake Davis | August 22, 2021 | 0.057 |
| 11 | 3 | "Two Queens On Two Queens" | Thembi Banks | Brendan Dowling | August 29, 2021 | 0.067 |
| 12 | 4 | "Apologies And Their Fluctuating Nature" | Kris Rey | Samantha Irby | August 29, 2021 | 0.072 |
| 13 | 5 | "Take Your Child To Work Day" | Kris Rey | Kate James & Sarah Halle Corey | September 5, 2021 | 0.033 |
| 14 | 6 | "Eleanor Roosevelt" | Mickey R. Mahoney | Abby McEnany & Tien Tran | September 12, 2021 | 0.045 |
| 15 | 7 | "Oh Say Can You See" | Lilly Wachowski | Kate James | September 19, 2021 | 0.064 |
| 16 | 8 | "FTP" | Yance Ford | Samantha Irby & Lilly Wachowski | September 26, 2021 | 0.057 |
| 17 | 9 | "Hey, Dad" | Yance Ford | Lilly Wachowski & Abby McEnany | October 3, 2021 | 0.062 |
| 18 | 10 | "I Release You" | Lilly Wachowski | Lilly Wachowski & Abby McEnany | October 10, 2021 | 0.066 |

== Production ==
According to Germaine, Lilly Wachowski was frequently on the set as an advisor and helped direct the sex scene of the third episode among others.

Michael Ognisanti served as the series cinematographer. Because the series is inspired by McEnany's life, the challenge for Ognisanti was to capture the authenticity of the story in the look of the show. For this reason, filming took place in real locations, mostly night interiors, and for lighting they used practical light sources augmented with small LEDs, to avoid making it look artificial. Because of the improvisational style of acting, Ognisanti used two Arri Alexa Mini cameras, for a higher chance to capture unscripted moments that could not be recreated after the fact. The cameras were fitted with Zeiss Super Speed lenses. Ognisanti storyboarded the whole series based on input by Mason in Cinema 4D before they went to shoot on location.

Inspired by her participation in Netflix's documentary film Disclosure, executive producer Lilly Wachowski made an emphatic push for trans representation throughout the cast and crew including the soundtrack. Transgender musicians in the show's soundtrack include Backxwash, Quay Dash, Sateen, SuperKnova, and Mel Stone.

== Reception ==
Critical reception of Work in Progress has been mostly positive. Rotten Tomatoes, a review aggregator website, reported a 100% critical approval rating with an average rating of 8.00/10 based on 30 reviews. The website's critical consensus reads, "As radically hilarious as it is relatably uncomfortable, Work in Progress is a stunning debut from co-creator and star Abby McEnany." On Metacritic, which uses a weighted average, the season is assigned a score of 78 out of 100, based on 10 critics, indicating "generally favorable reviews".

=== Accolades ===
| Year | Award | Category | Recipient(s) | Result | Ref. |
|---|---|---|---|---|---|
| 2022 | GLAAD Media Awards | Outstanding Comedy Series | Work in Progress | Nominated | |
