= Mary Sohn =

American actress

- Born: November 7, 1980 (age 45); Champaign, Illinois
- Occupation: Actress
- Years active: 2008–present

Mary Sohn is an American actress. She is best known for playing Mary Wagner in the sitcom A.P. Bio.

== Early life ==
Sohn was born in Champaign, Illinois, the third and youngest child of Korean-American immigrants. Both her father and two older sisters work with medicine while her mother works as a school teacher. She planned on studying medicine when she entered college. She was inspired to act after watching a Second City live performance during her first semester

== Career ==
Some of her early career appearances include the sitcom Bajillion Dollar Propertie$, the comedy film The Boss and the sitcom Teachers. Her biggest role thus far has been playing Mary Wagner in the sitcom A.P. Bio. She made a guest appearance on the podcast series The Neighbourhood Listen. She had a recurring role in the comedy drama series Work in Progress portraying Susan.

== Filmography ==
=== Film ===
Year	Title	Role	Notes
2008	Untied Strangers	Amy	Short
2009	Irregular Fruit	Abby	Short
2010	Company Outing	Woman	Short
2016	Darby Forever	Mom	
2016	The Boss	Jan Keller	
2016	Hail Mary	Heidi	
2018	Watch Party	Woman	Short
2019	Frontier Tween	Apollonia Mulch	
2019	Between Two Ferns: The Movie	Tina	
2022	Hug Lottery	Woman	Short
2022	Cock N' Bull 3	Woman	Short
2022	Open and Shut	Jen	Short
2025	Freakier Friday	Vivian	

=== Television ===
Year	Title	Role	Notes
2013	Rick & Len Fix Sh!t in Your House	Gloria	Episode; Carpet
2013	Hello Ladies	Barbara	Episode; Long Beach
2015	The Comedians	New Wardrobe Girl	Episode; Overhear
2016	Love	Gina	Episode; The Table Read
2016	TripTank	Ho#1	Episode; Sick Day
2016	Comedy Bang! Bang!	Mary	2 episodes
2017	555	Makeup Woman 2	Episode; Aliens
2017	Teachers	Denise	2 episodes
2017	Superior Donuts	Logan's Mom	Episode; Arthurs Day Off
2017	Shrink	Mary	2 episodes
2018-2019	Comedy Bang Bang: The Podcast	Herself	4 episodes
2016-2019	Bajillion Dollar Propertie$	Mara	3 episodes
2020	The Neighbourhood Listen	Barbara	Episode; Club Tee Gee Drama, "Bones" and a Person Killed
2020	Aunty Donna's Big Ol' House of Fun	Police Officer 2	3 episodes
2018-2021	A.P. Bio	Mary Wagner	42 episodes
2019-2021	Work in Progress	Susan	8 episodes
2022	Grace and Frankie	Ms. Alexander	Episode; The Beginning
2023	The Neighborhood	Virginia	Episode; Welcome to the Getaway
2023	Miracle Workers	Cult Member	2 episodes
2024	Curb Your Enthusiasm	Waitress	Episode; Atlanta
