= A.P. Bio =

American sitcom

- Genre: Workplace comedy Sitcom
- Created by: Mike O'Brien
- Starring: Glenn Howerton; Lyric Lewis; Mary Sohn; Jean Villepique; Tom Bennett; Patton Oswalt; Paula Pell
- Opening theme: "Listen to My Heart" by Ramones
- Composer: Jeff Cardoni
- Country of origin: United States
- Original language: English
- No. of seasons: 4
- No. of episodes: 42

Production
- Executive producers: Mike O'Brien; Seth Meyers; Lorne Michaels; Andrew Singer; Michael Shoemaker
- Producers: Hilary Marx; Katy Jenson; Shelly Gossman; Glenn Howerton; Barbara Stoll
- Cinematography: Blake McClure
- Editors: Adam Lichtenstein; Dane McMaster; Rob Burnett
- Camera setup: Single-camera
- Running time: 22 minutes
- Production companies: Broadway Video; Sethmaker Shoemeyers Productions; Human Rabbit (seasons 2–4); Universal Television

Original release
- Network: NBC
- Release: February 1, 2018 – June 13, 2019
- Network: Peacock
- Release: September 3, 2020 – September 2, 2021

A.P. Bio is an American television sitcom that premiered on February 1, 2018, on NBC as a mid-season replacement. It aired on NBC for two seasons until June 13, 2019, and moved to Peacock for its subsequent seasons. Set in Toledo, Ohio, the series centers on the everyday lives of the faculty and students of the fictitious Whitlock High School, in particular reluctant AP Biology teacher Jack Griffin (Glenn Howerton), who refuses to teach the subject out of fury that he was denied a prestigious professorship at Harvard University in philosophy. Instead of teaching, he either ignores his students altogether or recruits them into various schemes to help him leave or get revenge. Mike O'Brien created the series and is a recurring writer. O'Brien is also one of the executive producers alongside Seth Meyers, Lorne Michaels, Andrew Singer, and Michael Shoemaker. The show also features Lyric Lewis, Mary Sohn, Jean Villepique, Paula Pell, and Patton Oswalt.

A.P. Bio was met with mixed reviews in its first season; however, subsequent seasons garnered a much more positive reception. In December 2021, the series was cancelled after four seasons.

== Plot ==
When disgraced Harvard philosophy professor Jack Griffin (Glenn Howerton) loses his dream job to his rival Miles Leonard (Tom Bennett), he is forced to return to his hometown of Toledo, Ohio, to work as an advanced placement biology teacher at Whitlock High School and live in his late mother's home. He makes it clear to his class that he will not be teaching them any biology. Realizing he has a room full of honour-roll students at his disposal, he decides to use them to get revenge on Miles. Eager to prove that he is still in charge, Principal Durbin (Patton Oswalt) struggles to keep Jack under control. In the second season, Jack uses his students to find out how the people of Toledo find happiness in their daily lives, to gather information for what he believes will be a bestselling book.

== Cast ==
=== Main ===
- Glenn Howerton as Dr. Jack Carson Griffin, a disgraced, self-absorbed former philosophy professor who reluctantly takes a job as an AP biology teacher while constantly scheming to get out of the job and regain his former glory. He employs his students to help him carry out tasks and promises them good grades as a reward.
  - Tate Birchmore (season 3) and Olivier Paris (season 4) play younger versions of Jack.
- Lyric Lewis as Stef Duncan, a history teacher who is friends with Jack, Mary, and Michelle. In the series finale, she gives birth to a daughter she names Evelyn Jack Duncan.
- Mary Sohn as Mary Wagner, an art teacher who is friends with Jack, Stef, and Michelle.
- Jean Villepique as Michelle Jones, a health and home economics teacher who is friends with Jack, Stef, and Mary.
  - Michelle was played by Vanessa Bayer in the original unaired pilot episode.
- Tom Bennett as Miles Leonard, a philosophy scholar and professor at Stanford University, and Jack's nemesis (season 1).
- Patton Oswalt as Principal Ralph Durbin, the principal of Whitlock High School. While kind and working in the school's best interests, he is irresponsible and somewhat childlike. He plays the keyboard and sings, and was in a ska band in the 1990s.
- Paula Pell as Helen Demarcus, Principal Durbin's secretary (seasons 2–4, recurring season 1).

=== Recurring ===
While most of the students appear in a majority of episodes, they are all credited as recurring characters.

==== Students ====
- Aparna Brielle as Sarika Sarkar, an over-achieving "teacher's pet" who usually opposes Jack's schemes.
- Nick Peine as Marcus Kasperak, the student council president in Jack's class. He is noted as being Jack's "least favourite student" and is constantly made fun of by him as a result.
- Allisyn Snyder as Heather Wilmore, a mousy AP Biology student and the daughter of an equally eccentric butcher, who acts as one of Jack's most trusted students/underlings, as she is one of the few initially eager to collaborate with his plans.
- Eddie Leavy as Anthony Lewis, a smart, sassy, effeminate AP Biology student with immense strength and a talent for singing.
- Jacob Houston as Victor Kozlowski, an intensely awkward and slow-talking AP Biology student.
- Spence Moore II as Dan Decker, a former bully originally from Florida forcibly enrolled into Jack's class as a punishment for throwing Devin's backpack into a pond. He initially is confused about both what the class is and why he is enrolled in it. Early in the series, he becomes kinder and develops a romantic interest in Heather. His classmates admire him for his charisma, as well as for keeping a level head and looking out for them.
- Sari Arambulo as Grace, a cheery AP Biology student. Starting in the second season, she is shown to have a mysterious dark past and frequently makes morbid comments.
- Marisa Baram as Marissa (seasons 2–4, recurring season 1), an AP Biology student. Despite appearing in all seasons, she is not given much characterization until the third-season finale, in which she bonds with Jack over their disdain for Toledo's annual "Katie Holmes Day".
- Jacob McCarthy as Devin, a quiet, brooding AP Biology student whom Jack calls "Prince of Darkness" (season 1).
- Tucker Albrizzi as Colin McConnell, an AP Biology student (season 1).
- Miguel Lee as Eduardo, Victor's childhood best friend who transfers to Jack's class (seasons 2–4).
- Jacob Timothy Manown as Caleb, an AP Biology student also in the drama club. He writes in his free time and is a fan of Principal Durbin's old ska band (seasons 2–4).
- Yuyao Deng as Yuyao, a Chinese AP Biology student who gains a speaking role in the third season (seasons 2–4).

==== Others ====
- Collette Wolfe as Meredith, Jack's ex-girlfriend.
- Charlie McCrackin as Coach Dick Novak, a gym teacher who coaches the Whitlock Rams football team.
- David Neher as Dave Pugh, a friendly but clumsy science teacher constantly mocked and teased by the other teachers.
- Brendan Jennings as Dale, the school's custodian, later promoted to "head custodian" by Durbin in the second season.
- Patricia Belcher as Superintendent Bullard (seasons 1–2, 4), the no-nonsense head of Toledo's municipal education department.
- Elizabeth Alderfer as Lynette Marie Hoffstadter, a payroll accountant who befriends Jack as she challenges his views and later becomes his love interest (seasons 2–4).
- Jaime Moyer as Joyce (seasons 2–4), Lynette's coworker who spends much of her time talking to her social media followers on her smartphone.
- Brad Morris as Keith, Michelle's husband (seasons 2–4).
- Cheryl Lynn Bowers as Rosemary Griffin (seasons 3–4), Jack's late mother appearing in flashbacks. In life, she was a devout Catholic, although the irreligious Jack never takes down any of the iconography around her house.
- Jane Morris as Rhonda (seasons 3–4).
- Ashley Tapia and Chloe Csengery as Ashley (season 4).
- Allison Bills as Trudy (season 4).
- Hayley Marie Norman as Shayla Howard, Jack's new girlfriend after Lynette breaks up with him (season 4).

=== Guest stars ===
- Nikki Glaser as Chloe from Baltimore
- Niecy Nash as Kim Burke
- Taran Killam as Mr. Vining
- Anjali Bhimani as Sarika's carefree unnamed mother
- Mark Proksch as Philip
- Michael Gross as Brandon
- Christopher Lloyd as Melvin, Jack's prank-loving neighbor
- Erinn Hayes as Trish
- Tim Heidecker as Greg, Jack's high school bully, now a motivational speaker
- Brooks Wheelan as Seth
- Jon Lovitz as Robin Schwonk, a demanding book publisher
- Johnny Pemberton as a saloon pianist in the students' fanfiction
- Ron Funches as Hans, a janitor who secretly works as an underground wrestler
- Bruce Campbell as John Griffin, Jack's father, who ran away before Jack was born and later became engaged to a Wiccan
- Tess Aubert as Gwen, Victor's childhood friend, and later his love interest
- Laura Kightlinger as Gabrielle
- Joe Manganiello as Malachi, Shayla's longtime friend, who competes with Jack for her affections
- Janine Brito as Kylie
- Darrell Dennis as a Detective
- Angela Kinsey as Brenda, Ralph's former wife

== Episodes ==
A.P. Bio by season
Season	Episodes	Originally released		
Season	Episodes	First released	Last released	Network
1	13	February 1, 2018	May 3, 2018	NBC
2	13	March 7, 2019	June 13, 2019	NBC
3	8	September 3, 2020		Peacock
4	8	September 2, 2021		Peacock

=== Season 1 (2018) ===
A.P. Bio season 1, episodes
No. overall	No. in season	Title	Directed by	Written by	Original release date	Prod. code	U.S. viewers (millions)
1	1	"Pilot: Catfish"	Oz Rodriguez	Mike O'Brien	February 1, 2018	101	3.12
When Harvard philosophy scholar Jack Griffin finds himself teaching high school in Toledo, he tosses the syllabus and recruits his students to help mentally break his dream-job-stealing nemesis Miles Leonard. In this episode, Jack encourages his students to catfish Miles on social media.
2	2	"Teacher Jail"	Oz Rodriguez	Rob Klein	February 25, 2018 (broadcast); February 2, 2018 (online)	102	5.89
The students fake an injury when Jack leaves the class unattended, sending him into a lengthy arbitration process where he is not allowed back in class but has to go to "teacher jail" where he is paid to not teach. The students are first assigned Helen as the substitute teacher, who does a terrible job due to her utter lack of qualifications and awkwardness. The students request another substitute, who arrives in class and is excited to teach them biology. While in the arbitration process, Jack has moral qualms about hurting Principal Ralph's reputation and so decides to return to work.
3	3	"Burning Miles"	Oz Rodriguez	Luvh Rakhe	March 1, 2018 (broadcast); February 2, 2018 (online)	103	2.70
While Principal Durbin struggles with budget cuts, Jack discovers his students pity him — so he rallies, making a splash at the school bake sale and getting kicked out of the bookstore for life.
4	4	"Overachieving Virgins"	Julie Anne Robinson	John Blickstead & Trey Kollmer	March 1, 2018	104	2.60
Jack gets into a petty dispute with Marcus, the President of Student Council, who surprisingly refuses to back down, causing the situation to escalate much too far. Meanwhile, Stef sells makeup at school as a side business.
5	5	"Dating Toledoans"	Ryan Case	Aseem Batra	March 8, 2018	105	2.33
Jack, who has been taking buses to New York to meet dates, is convinced to let Stef, Mary, and Michelle show him how to enjoy Toledo. Meanwhile, Principal Durbin finds out that his announcements have not been as well received as he had previously believed when Helen covers for him and entertains everyone.
6	6	"Freakin' Enamored"	Oz Rodriguez	Shelly Gossman	March 15, 2018	106	3.07
When Jack is attracted to Colin's mother at a parent–teacher conference, he feigns interest in her son only to have it backfire. Meanwhile, a group of parents complain to Principal Durbin when they notice a piece of controversial student art from Mary's class, resulting in her inciting a protest.
7	7	"Selling Out"	Payman Benz	Donick Cary	March 22, 2018	107	2.87
After Jack receives an offer from Miles's publisher to write a book of feel-good philosophy, he enlists the help of Helen in hopes of using the deal as his ticket out of Toledo. Meanwhile, Principal Durbin accidentally sets off an emotional firestorm when he reveals who Mary chose as her emergency contact.
8	8	"We Don't Party"	Daniel Gray Longino	Nicole Sun	March 29, 2018	108	2.05
Jack finds out his ex-girlfriend needs a venue for a charity fundraiser and suggests a student's house. The students are inspired by Jack to party for the first time at the same event, but they take things too far and are forced to sneak out.
9	9	"Rosemary's Boyfriend"	Maggie Carey	Mike O'Brien & Charlie McCrackin	April 5, 2018	109	2.21
Jack is incensed when his late mother's former lover shows up and suggests they celebrate her birthday. Jack taps his students to help him retaliate, but they are busy caring for robot babies. Stef's kindness toward the janitor sends the wrong signals.
10	10	"Durbin Crashes"	Andrew DeYoung	Mike O'Brien & Rob Klein	April 12, 2018	110	2.05
Jack takes in Durbin after giving him marriage advice that backfires and gets him kicked out of the house. The students try to help Jack get revenge against Miles.
11	11	"Eight Pigs and a Rat"	Carrie Brownstein	Mike O'Brien & Zeke Nicholson	April 19, 2018	111	1.83
The class receives a shipment of fetal pigs for dissection, but Jack cancels the dissection and fails an attempt at shooting the pigs at Miles. The superintendent visits Whitlock High School in order to evaluate Durbin for an "Innovative Principal of the Year" nomination; she is disappointed when each teacher presents a volcano as a supposed part of their curriculum. Jack and Heather demonstrate a live dissection session, using a full-grown hog that Heather stole from her father's butcher shop, and the superintendent is satisfied.
12	12	"Walleye"	Tristram Shapeero	Mike O'Brien & Britt Matt	April 26, 2018	112	1.69
Jack successfully convinces Miles that Devin is his illegitimate son. Durbin, Mary, Stef and Michelle clash on the Sadie Hawkins dance theme.
13	13	"Drenching Dallas"	Lynn Shelton	Mike O'Brien & Jeff Vanderkruik & Brian Ashburn	May 3, 2018	113	2.03
Jack takes interest in a revenge mission on behalf of the students. Mary, Stef and Michelle believe they have discovered an otherworldly presence.

=== Season 2 (2019) ===
A.P. Bio season 2, episodes
No. overall	No. in season	Title	Directed by	Written by	Original release date	Prod. code	U.S. viewers (millions)
14	1	"Happiness"	Trent O'Donnell	Donick Cary	March 7, 2019	201	1.88
Jack attempts to unlock the secret of what makes ordinary people happy, leading him to an idea for a new book that he believes will be his ticket out of Whitlock High. Plus, Mary, Stef and Michelle celebrate a special day.
15	2	"Nuns"	Lynn Shelton	John Blickstead & Trey Kollmer	March 14, 2019	202	1.96
As the newly minted driver's education teacher, Jack sets out to get revenge on his mother's church when he discovers the last of her money was used to buy a statue of the Virgin Mary.
16	3	"Wednesday Morning, 8 AM"	John Solomon	Mike O'Brien	March 21, 2019	203	2.23
In the hectic 30 minutes that start every day at Whitlock, Jack tries to retrieve his massage chair from Whitlock's intriguing payroll accountant, Lynette. Durbin and Helen prepare for the morning announcements. Michelle gives a eulogy.
17	4	"Toledo's Top 100"	Maggie Carey	Emily Cutler	March 28, 2019	204	2.33
Jack is aghast to learn he did not make the top 10 in Toledo's Top 100 Bachelors, and Durbin did. Victor and Eduardo decide it is time to reveal their feelings to their crushes.
18	5	"J'accuse"	Andy DeYoung	Mike O'Brien & Charlie McCrackin	April 4, 2019	205	1.91
Jack tries to impress Lynette using Michelle's annual murder mystery party as a distraction. Plus, desperate students break into Whitlock High to steal the AP biology practice exams.
19	6	"Melvin"	Katie Locke O'Brien	Dan Klein	April 11, 2019	206	2.05
Jack's war with his neighbor Melvin (Christopher Lloyd) reaches a turning point when it threatens a potential date with Lynette. Plus, the school photographer increases his payment rate, so Durbin comes up with his own plan for school picture day.
20	7	"Personal Everest"	John Solomon & Andy DeYoung	Shelly Gossman	April 18, 2019	207	1.81
Jack is furious when his former high school bully is hired as a motivational speaker at Whitlock. Plus, Mary, Stef and Michelle set their own personal goals for female empowerment, accidentally causing a rift between Helen and Durbin.
21	8	"Sweet Low Road"	Richie Keen	Donick Cary & Emily Cutler	April 25, 2019	208	1.66
When budget cuts threaten to gut Whitlock and put his job in jeopardy, Jack recruits Mary, Stef and Michelle to take down the superintendent. Durbin plans an appeal to the heart, while the students plan an appeal to the soul.
22	9	"Dr. Whoopsie"	Blake McClure	Mike O'Brien & Rob Klein	May 2, 2019	209	1.79
When an embarrassing video of him falling off a stage goes viral, Jack plans a viral video of his own. Plus, Durbin, Helen and the teachers hunt down Whitlock's most notorious litterer known as The Sugar Daddy.
23	10	"Handcuffed"	Jennifer Arnold	Paula Pell	May 30, 2019	210	2.26
When he is kicked off his Harvard phone plan, Jack is offered a chance to leapfrog onto Mary's on one condition — he must help her break up with her scuzzy boyfriend. Anthony becomes Durbin's right-hand man.
24	11	"Spectacle"	Carrie Brownstein	Amy Hubbs	May 30, 2019	211	1.60
When his computer breaks, Jack rallies his class to win the annual Whitlock's Got Talent competition so he can use the prize money for a new laptop. Plus, Helen and Durbin host the show, while Mary, Stef and Michelle perform a hand-bell routine.
25	12	"Ride the Ram"	Mike O'Brien	Mike O'Brien & John Solomon	June 13, 2019	212	1.58
It is the most exciting time of the year at Whitlock: Durbin's birthday and Spirit Week. Jack does his best to steer clear of any school spirit as everyone else comes together to take down their hated rivals at Prairie High.
26	13	"Kinda Sorta"	Trent O'Donnell	Teleplay by : John Blickstead & Trey Kollmer; Story by : Shelly Gossman & Britt Matt	June 13, 2019	213	1.38
Sarika has an offer for Jack when the university fair comes to Whitlock — get her into Harvard and she will get his book to her publisher aunt. Plus, Stef prepares for a visit from a fling, while Helen applies to university.

=== Season 3 (2020) ===
A.P. Bio season 3, episodes
No. overall	No. in season	Title	Directed by	Written by	Original release date	Prod. code
27	1	"Tiny Problems"	Oz Rodriguez	Donick Cary	September 3, 2020	301
Hoping to continue a childhood tradition, Jack orders a new popcorn maker but is disappointed when he receives a prop for a dollhouse. Jack enlists his students to get revenge on the store that sold him the dollhouse prop, and decides to use a glitter bomb in one of her dollhouses. Helen goes back to school to get her high school degree and is one of Jack's students; he uses her to distract the storeowner to hide the glitter bomb. When Helen catches Jack making fun of her, he changes his mind and he and Helen break into the store to remove the glitter bomb, but Helen trips and destroys numerous dollhouses. Principal Durbin takes over Helen's secretarial roles in her absence and is quickly overwhelmed. Jack's girlfriend repairs his popcorn maker, and he is content to continue his old tradition.
28	2	"Disgraced"	Oz Rodriguez	Shelly Gossman	September 3, 2020	302
Mr. Pugh plans a field trip for the Toledo chapter of the Ohio Naturalists, but Victor is unable to get permission to go. He hacks Durbin's email and attempts to extort him to let the students go on the field trip, but confesses when Durbin is about to go through an embarrassing act on school television, and Durbin cancels the trip. Jack meets with Sarika's aunt, but finds that instead of publishing his book, she wants him to ghostwrite a book for famous author Robin Schwonk. Schwonk claims to hate Jack's work, causing Jack to hide his own chapters in Schwonk's book, with the hope that Schwonk will get in trouble for plagiarizing Jack's work. Schwonk reveals that he was simply tormenting Jack and loved the book, but then later discovered Jack's plot and bought the rights to Jack's book, keeping him out of trouble and stopping Jack's plans to publish his own book.
29	3	"Gary Meets Dave"	Richie Keen	Dan Schofield	September 3, 2020	303
Jack accidentally loses a significant amount of money and it falls into the hands of the students, who believe they are buying drugs when they are buying flour. The other teachers fear that they accidentally killed someone in their walking group and concoct an elaborate story to cover for it, despite him not being dead. Dale, the janitor, poses as a teacher when his wife visits him at work. Principal Durbin and Helen investigate who stole the money, and the students and teachers admit to their wrongdoings.
30	4	"Get Hoppy!"	Glenn Howerton	Jess Lacher	September 3, 2020	304
Principal Durbin takes it upon himself to help Jack advance his book with an appearance on Toledo's morning TV show, but lets his five minutes of fame get the best of him. The other teachers lead a competition within the Young Entrepreneurs Club.
31	5	"Mr. Pistachio"	Oz Rodriguez	Gilli Nissim	September 3, 2020	305
Jack has Mary drive him to the doctor, but a prank results in him getting the same procedure twice. At school, Durbin and Helen embarrass themselves, and the students compete over class superlative titles.
32	6	"That That That"	Richie Keen	Charlie McCrackin	September 3, 2020	306
As the school prepares for winter break, Jack tries to use the isolation to record a lecture on Thoreau's transcendentalism as a way into the University of Wisconsin's philosophy department. Frustrated and unable to finish the video, he falls asleep and has nightmares, which worsen when he accidentally inhales rat poison sprayed by fumigators. Jack learns that the company of others helps him keep his sanity, only to discover too late that he sent a video of himself acting chaotically during his hallucinations to the university.
33	7	"Aces Wild"	Oz Rodriguez	Shelly Gossman & Brendan Jennings	September 3, 2020	307
Principal Durbin and Helen sweep lockers. Jack finds out that Anthony has been lying about his extracurricular activities. Jack and Lynette follow Anthony to find out what he has really been up to. The search for Stef's baby donor intensifies.
34	8	"Katie Holmes Day"	Anu Valia	Debbie Jhoon & Michael J. Feldman	September 3, 2020	308
While the rest of the town prepares for the celebration of Toledo's annual Katie Holmes Day, Jack and Marissa plot to ruin the holiday pageant, which tells the story of how Holmes landed her breakout acting role on Dawson's Creek, by stealing everyone's decorations and gifts. Though Jack does not believe in miracles and sarcastically prays for a chance to spend one more moment with his mother, a mysterious old man with a long white beard arrives at Jack's house and delivers a VCR containing a message from his mother, igniting Jack's holiday spirit as the citizens hold the pageant regardless of his and Marissa's activity. Jack confesses the truth on stage and encourages everyone to let Marissa finally fulfil her chance to play Holmes in the pageant.

=== Season 4 (2021) ===
A.P. Bio season 4, episodes
No. overall	No. in season	Title	Directed by	Written by	Original release date	Prod. code
35	1	"Tornado!"	Katie Locke O'Brien	Mike O'Brien	September 2, 2021	401
A tornado puts the school on lockdown and Helen believes it is coming specifically for her. The students pass the time by writing fan fiction, "shipping" various combinations of faculty members. Mary, Stef and Michelle devise a plan to escape the school.
36	2	"Sweatpants"	Katie Locke O'Brien	Rob Klein	September 2, 2021	402
Jack has the students form a fake cult to sabotage Principal Durbin's new school uniforms, but to his horror, it soon starts operating like a real cult. Mary, Stef and Michelle prepare to see one of their favourite artists who is in town to perform.
37	3	"An Oath to Rusty"	Katie Locke O'Brien	Shelly Gossman	September 2, 2021	403
Jack attempts to get closer with the other men at work by inviting them over for a game night. Helen helps Principal Durbin be more confident and assertive. Stef and Mary try to coax information out of Michelle about the court case she was a juror on.
38	4	"Tons of Rue"	Katie Locke O'Brien	John Blickstead & Trey Kollmer	September 2, 2021	404
When the A.P. Bio students reunite Jack with his estranged father John, Jack plots revenge by trying to expose his allegedly reformed father, who is engaged to a Wiccan. The witch foretells of a grim future for Mary, Stef and Michelle that divides the women.
39	5	"The Perfect Date from Hell"	Oz Rodriguez	David Neher & Charlie McCrackin	September 2, 2021	405
When Jack discovers his new girlfriend's therapy homework requires dating him, he turns the tables on her. Principal Durbin goes undercover to determine which faculty member is most worthy of a very special prize.
40	6	"Love, for Lack of a Better Term"	Heath Cullens	Jess Lacher	September 2, 2021	406
Victor attempts to catch up to his peers and become a man by sending Ashlanda a risqué photo. Grace and Anthony try to "Parent Trap" Mary and Principal Durbin after overhearing a conversation that makes them take pity on the single adults.
41	7	"Malachi"	Heath Cullens	Debbie Jhoon & Michael J. Feldman	September 2, 2021	407
When Jack's girlfriend says she is going to dinner with a male friend, a jealous Jack tags along, and the two compete for her affections. Principal Durbin, Mary, Stef and Michelle take Helen out to cheer her up after a breakup.
42	8	"The Harvard Pen"	Oz Rodriguez	Teleplay by : Clayton English & Hadiyah Robinson; Story by : Brendan Jennings	September 2, 2021	408
Jack is enraged to find that the A.P. Bio students have stolen his beloved Harvard pen after he asked them not to touch it. Principal Durbin and Helen repeatedly fail the superintendent's inspections.

== Production ==
=== Development ===
The series was created by Mike O'Brien for NBC, to debut during the 2017–18 television season. On January 23, 2017, NBC officially ordered the pilot. The series was greenlit on May 11, 2017. The series premiered on February 1, 2018, at 8:30 p.m.

On May 8, 2018, NBC renewed the series for a second season, which premiered on March 7, 2019. On May 24, 2019, NBC cancelled the series after two seasons. In July 2019, NBC reversed this decision and renewed the series for a third season, which premiered on NBCUniversal's streaming service, Peacock, on September 3, 2020. On December 17, 2020, Peacock renewed the series for a fourth and final season, which premiered on September 2, 2021. On December 6, 2021, Peacock cancelled the series after four seasons.

=== Casting ===
In February 2017, it was announced that Mary Sohn and Lyric Lewis had joined the pilot's main cast. In March 2017, it was reported that Aparna Brielle, Glenn Howerton, Patton Oswalt, Nick Peine and Jacob McCarthy had joined the cast in their main roles. On June 12, 2017, it was announced that Tom Bennett had joined as a series regular. On August 1, 2017, it was announced that Jean Villepique had joined as a series regular.

== Reception ==
=== Critical response ===
The first season holds a score of 66% with an average rating of 6.34/10 on the review aggregation website Rotten Tomatoes, based on 32 reviews. The site's critical consensus states, "A.P. Bio has some genuine laughs, but audiences have already seen plenty of authority figures behaving badly — and have a right to expect more from this promising premise and talented cast." Metacritic, which uses a weighted average, assigned the series a score of 59 out of 100 based on 17 critics.

Writing in The Hollywood Reporter, Daniel Fienberg commented that A.P. Bio had a good cast and "the only thing holding it back is the small quibble that it's not actually all that funny." Margaret Lyons of The New York Times called A.P. Bio "an abrasive sitcom that isn't merely unfunny, it's also deeply unpleasant." Jen Chaney of Vulture said the series had bright spots but was "conceptually played-out" overall.

=== Ratings ===
==== Overall ====
Viewership and ratings per season of A.P. Bio
Season	Timeslot (ET)	Episodes	First aired		Last aired		TV season	Viewership rank	Avg. viewers (millions)
Season	Timeslot (ET)	Episodes	Date	Viewers (millions)	Date	Viewers (millions)	TV season	Viewership rank	Avg. viewers (millions)
1	Thursday 8:30 pm	13	February 1, 2018	3.12	May 3, 2018	2.03	2017–18	134	3.54
2	Thursday 8:30 pm	13	March 7, 2019	1.88	June 13, 2019	1.38	2018–19	149	2.50

==== Season 1 ====
Viewership and ratings per episode of A.P. Bio
No.	Title	Air date	Rating/share (18–49)	Viewers (millions)
1	"Catfish"	February 1, 2018	0.8/3	3.12
2	"Teacher Jail"	February 25, 2018	1.4/6	5.89
3	"Burning Miles"	March 1, 2018	0.7/3	2.70
4	"Overachieving Virgins"	March 1, 2018	0.7/3	2.60
5	"Dating Toledoans"	March 8, 2018	0.7/3	2.33
6	"Freakin' Enamored"	March 15, 2018	0.9/3	3.07
7	"Selling Out"	March 22, 2018	0.8/3	2.87
8	"We Don't Party"	March 29, 2018	0.6/2	2.05
9	"Rosemary's Boyfriend"	April 5, 2018	0.6/2	2.21
10	"Durbin Crashes"	April 12, 2018	0.6/3	2.05
11	"Eight Pigs and a Rat"	April 19, 2018	0.6/3	1.83
12	"Walleye"	April 26, 2018	0.5/2	1.69
13	"Drenching Dallas"	May 3, 2018	0.6/3	2.03

==== Season 2 ====
Viewership and ratings per episode of A.P. Bio
No.	Title	Air date	Rating/share (18–49)	Viewers (millions)
1	"Happiness"	March 7, 2019	0.5/3	1.88
2	"Nuns"	March 14, 2019	0.5/3	1.96
3	"Wednesday Morning, 8 AM"	March 21, 2019	0.5/3	2.23
4	"Toledo's Top 100"	March 28, 2019	0.5/3	2.33
5	"J'accuse"	April 4, 2019	0.5/3	1.99
6	"Melvin"	April 11, 2019	0.5/3	2.05
7	"Personal Everest"	April 18, 2019	0.5/3	1.81
8	"Sweet Low Road"	April 25, 2019	0.4/2	1.66
9	"Dr. Whoopsie"	May 2, 2019	0.5/3	1.79
10	"Handcuffed"	May 30, 2019	0.4/2	2.26
11	"Spectacle"	May 30, 2019	0.4/2	1.60
12	"Ride the Ram"	June 13, 2019	0.3/2	1.58
13	"Kinda Sorta"	June 13, 2019	0.3/2	1.38

== Home media ==
The first season of A.P. Bio was released on DVD in the United States on August 14, 2018 and in Australia on June 6, 2019.
