= Tracker (American TV series) =

American drama television series

- Genre: Action; Drama
- Based on: The Never Game by Jeffery Deaver
- Developed by: Ben H. Winters
- Starring: Justin Hartley; Robin Weigert; Abby McEnany; Eric Graise; Fiona Rene; Chris Lee (Note: Lee is credited as part of the starring cast starting from season 3, episode 13.); Cassady McClincy Zhang
- Music by: Tyler Bates; Joanne Higginbottom
- Country of origin: United States
- Original language: English
- No. of seasons: 4
- No. of episodes: 61 (list of episodes)

Production
- Executive producers: Ken Olin; Justin Hartley; Ben H. Winters; Elwood Reid; Sharon Lee Watson; Alex Katsnelson; Connie Dolphin; Ryan O'Nan; Travis Donnelly
- Production locations: Vancouver, British Columbia, Canada
- Cinematography: Yasu Tanida; Brian Pearson; Ronald Paul Richard; Cynthia Pusheck
- Editors: Nancy Morrison; Tim Mirkovich; Jeff Asher; Pietro Cecchini; Amanda Bliss Taylor
- Camera setup: Single-camera
- Production companies: Beekeeper Entertainment; Elwood Reid Inc.; Afterportsmouth Productions; ChangeUp Productions; 20th Television

Original release
- Network: CBS
- Release: February 11, 2024 – present

Tracker is an American action drama television series developed by Ben H. Winters and based on the 2019 novel The Never Game by Jeffery Deaver. The series stars Justin Hartley as Colter Shaw, a skilled survivalist and tracker who earns his living by assisting law enforcement and private citizens in exchange for reward money. Hartley is joined by principal cast members Robin Weigert, Abby McEnany, Eric Graise, and Fiona Rene.

The series is produced by 20th Television and was given a series order in December 2022, after initially being picked up for a pilot in July 2022. It was filmed in British Columbia, Canada, leveraging the scenic locales of the Vancouver metro area, and in Martini Film Studios. Winters and Hilary Weisman Graham served as showrunners.

Tracker premiered on February 11, 2024, following Super Bowl LVIII on CBS. In March 2024, the series was renewed for a second season, which premiered on October 13, 2024. In February 2025, the series was renewed for a third season which premiered on October 19, 2025. In January 2026, the series was renewed for a fourth season which premiered on October 4, 2026.

== Cast and characters ==
=== Main ===
- Justin Hartley as Colter Shaw, a lone-wolf survivalist with extensive tracking skills who travels the country as a "rewardist." Shaw makes his living aiding law enforcement and private citizens in exchange for reward money. According to the source novel, he "was named after the mountain man John Colter, with the Lewis and Clark expedition".
  - Prestyn Bates as young Colter Shaw
- Robin Weigert as Teddi Bruin (season 1), who acts as one of Colter's handlers, finding cases for him to take and doing background research for him while on cases
- Abby McEnany as Velma Bruin (seasons 1–2), Teddi's wife and Colter's second handler
- Eric Graise as Bobby Exley (seasons 1–2), a hacker who assists Shaw from a technical standpoint
- Fiona Rene as Reenie Greene, an attorney who assists Shaw in legal matters
- Chris Lee as Randy Davis (season 3–present; recurring seasons 2–3), Bobby's cousin who is also a hacker and fills in for Bobby while he is away and later replaces Bobby when Bobby leaves for another job opportunity
- Cassady McClincy Zhang as Melanie "Mel" Day (season 4; recurring season 3), Reenie's new assistant

=== Recurring ===
- Jensen Ackles as Russell Shaw, Colter's estranged older brother. From the source novel, "he was named after Osborne Russell, a frontiersman in Oregon."
  - Mathew Nelson-Mahood as young Russell Shaw
- Sofia Pernas as Billie Matalon. Billie is a rival rewardist who occasionally crosses paths with Colter on jobs.
- Brent Sexton as John Keaton (seasons 2–present), a former Tacoma detective who helps Colter with his "white whale" case
- Floriana Lima as Camille Picket (season 2), a woman that Colter has a history with who had a missing sister for years
- Pej Vahdat as Leonard Sharf (season 2), a client of Reenie who wants to throw one of his founding partners under the bus
- Mark Engelhardt as Emile Lang (season 3), a contract killer
- Kathleen Robertson as Maxine (season 3), a lawyer who hires Reenie to dig up dirt on a class action lawsuit
- Michael Malarkey as Adam (season 4)

=== Guest starring ===
- Lee Tergesen as Ashton Shaw, Colter's father
- Wendy Crewson as Mary Dove Shaw, Colter's mother
- Gil Birmingham as Gus, a friend of Reenie's father
- Peter Stormare as Valts
- Melissa Roxburgh as Dory Shaw, Colter's younger sister who is a physics professor at Wyoming Science University. From the source novel: "My kid sister's Dorion, after Marie Aioe Dorion, one of the first mountain women in North America. She and her two kids survived for two months in the dead of winter in hostile territory - Marie Aioe, not my sister."
- Jennifer Morrison as Lizzy Hawking, a family friend of Colter's
- David Ramsey as Hale Ripley (season 3), a stuntman who went missing
- Erica Durance as Laura (season 3), Hale's girlfriend
- Chris Jericho as Virgil Dean (season 3)
- Jon Beavers as James Clark (season 3)
- Jes Macallan as Willa Simms, detective (season 3)
- Josh Holloway as Luke Kelsol (season 4), a rival rewardist

== Episodes ==
Season	Episodes	Originally released		Rank	Average viewership (in millions)
Season	Episodes	First released	Last released	Rank	Average viewership (in millions)
1	13	February 11, 2024	May 19, 2024	3	10.84
2	20	October 13, 2024	May 11, 2025	1	17.34
3	22	October 19, 2025	May 24, 2026	2	16.3
4	TBA	October 4, 2026	TBA	TBA	TBA

== Production ==
=== Development ===
Tracker is produced by 20th Television and based on Jeffery Deaver's 2019 novel The Never Game. Due to a pre-existing agreement between 20th Television and CBS, the series was picked up to pilot by the network in July 2022. In December 2022, it was given a series order. In March 2023, the title of the series was changed to Tracker. On March 4, 2024, the series was renewed for a second season. On February 20, 2025, the series was renewed for a third season. On January 22, 2026, CBS renewed the series for a fourth season.

=== Casting ===
In January 2021, Justin Hartley joined the series as Colter Shaw. In September 2022, Mary McDonnell was cast as Mary Dove Shaw. That month, Robin Weigert, Abby McEnany, and Eric Graise had also joined the series. In April 2024, Melissa Roxburgh and Jensen Ackles were cast to guest star. In August 2024, it was reported that Weigert is not returning as a series regular for the second season. In September 2024, Floriana Lima was cast in a recurring role for the second season. In February 2025, Chris Lee joined the cast in a recurring capacity for the second season. In March 2025, Pej Vahdat was cast in a recurring role for the second season. In July 2025, Graise and McEnany left the series ahead of the third season. In December 2025, Kathleen Robertson and Mark Engelhardt joined the cast in recurring capacities for the third season. In January 2026, it was reported that Erica Durance and David Ramsey are set to guest star for an episode of the third season. In March 2026, Chris Jericho guest starred on the "Breakaway" episode. In the same episode, Lee was promoted to series regular. In September 2026, Cassady McClincy Zhang was promoted to series regular while Michael Malarkey joined the cast in a recurring role for fourth season.

=== Filming ===
Tracker is filmed in British Columbia, Canada, on location around the Vancouver metro area, and at Vancouver Film Studios. Filming for the second season began on July 16, 2024, and concluded on April 1, 2025. Filming for the third season began on July 17, 2025, and concluded on April 17, 2026. Production relocated to Los Angeles starting with the fourth season.

== Release ==
=== Broadcast ===
Tracker premiered on February 11, 2024, on CBS in the United States as the lead-out show following Super Bowl LVIII (except on Kansas City's KCTV, where Super Bowl postgame victory coverage led to the show airing on sister station KSMO-TV). In Canada, the series aired in simulcast on CTV. The second season premiered on October 13, 2024. The third season premiered on October 19, 2025. The fourth season premiered on October 4, 2026.

=== Streaming ===
As part of the global content licensing agreement between Disney Entertainment and Netflix, the first three seasons of the series are set to streaming on Netflix worldwide (outside the U.S.) starting February 26, 2027 under a multiyear agreement.

== Reception ==
=== Critical response ===
The review aggregator website Rotten Tomatoes reported an 89% approval rating with an average rating of 6.8/10, based on 19 critic reviews. The website's critics consensus reads, "Making great use of Justin Hartley's swaggering appeal, Tracker takes a spartan approach to a classic formula and yields a highly efficient entertainment." Metacritic, which uses a weighted average, assigned a score of 64 out of 100 based on 12 critics, indicating "generally favorable reviews".

=== Ratings ===
Viewership and ratings per season of Tracker
Season	Timeslot (ET)	Episodes	First aired		Last aired		TV season	Viewership rank	Avg. viewers (millions)	18–49 rank	Avg. 18–49 rating
Season	Timeslot (ET)	Episodes	Date	Viewers (millions)	Date	Viewers (millions)	TV season	Viewership rank	Avg. viewers (millions)	18–49 rank	Avg. 18–49 rating
1	Sunday 10:00 p.m. (1); Sunday 9:00 p.m. (2–5, 7, 9–13); Sunday 8:00 p.m. (6, 8)	13	February 11, 2024	18.44	May 19, 2024	7.65	2023–24	3	10.84	9 (Note: Tied with The Golden Bachelor and Chicago Fire.)	0.80
2	Sunday 8:00 p.m. (1, 4, 7, 9–20); Sunday 8:30 p.m. (2–3); Sunday 9:00 p.m. (5–6, 8)	20	October 13, 2024	8.31	May 11, 2025	8.27	2024–25	1	17.34	8	2.15
3	Sunday 8:00 p.m. (1, 4, 6, 8–9); Sunday 8:30 p.m. (2–3, 5, 7); Sunday 9:00 p.m. (10–18, 20–22); Sunday 8:59 p.m. (19)	22	October 19, 2025	8.03	May 24, 2026	TBD	2025–26	2	16.3	12	1.85
4	Sunday 9:30 p.m. (1); Sunday 9:00 p.m. (2+)	TBA	October 4, 2026	TBD	TBA	TBD	2026–27	TBD	TBD	TBD	TBD
