= List of Tracker episodes =

The following is an episode list for the American action drama television series Tracker developed by Ben H. Winters and based on the 2019 novel The Never Game by Jeffery Deaver, which premiered on CBS on February 11, 2024. The second season premiered on October 13, 2024. The third season premiered on October 19, 2025. The fourth season premiered on October 4, 2026.

As of November 15, 2026, 61 episodes of Tracker have aired, currently in its fourth season.

== Series overview ==
Season	Episodes	Originally released		Rank	Average viewership (in millions)
Season	Episodes	First released	Last released	Rank	Average viewership (in millions)
1	13	February 11, 2024	May 19, 2024	3	10.84
2	20	October 13, 2024	May 11, 2025	1	17.34
3	22	October 19, 2025	May 24, 2026	2	16.3
4	TBA	October 4, 2026	TBA	TBA	TBA

== Episodes ==
=== Season 1 (2024) ===
No. overall	No. in season	Title	Directed by	Written by	Original release date	Prod. code	U.S. viewers (millions)
1	1	"Klamath Falls"	Ken Olin	Ben H. Winters	February 11, 2024	1NHU01	18.44
Colter Shaw is a professional "tracker" who lives off reward money for finding missing people. After rescuing a hiker in Nevada, Colter receives a mission from his co-handler Teddi to find 14-year-old Gilbert Brown, believed to be with his non-custodial father Edward. Colter contacts tech expert Bobby and learns Gilbert agreed to meet with his father at a restaurant. After entering the security room, Colter learns Gilbert is not with his father before being arrested. Teddi contacts attorney Reenie, who gets Colter released. Bobby tells Colter that Edward died months ago and learns from Edward's rehab friends that the kidnapper is Jack Horvath, another patient who impersonated Edward so Gilbert would lead him to money Edward buried. Colter enters the forest and finds Gilbert handcuffed to a truck. Jack arrives, and Colter convinces him to hand over the handcuff key, but a police helicopter appears, leading Jack to shoot Colter in the shoulder and flee in his truck. Colter hops into the bed, and after a police chase Jack shoots himself, causing the truck to slide partially off a cliff. The two fall into the water below and survive. After calls from his brother Russell, Colter visits their father's grave.
2	2	"Missoula"	Ken Olin	Tegan Shohet & David Radcliff	February 18, 2024	1NHU04	6.87
Colter's mother tells him someone broke into his father's office. In Montana, accountant Jackson Cheong is missing after quitting his job. Colter learns from Bobby that Jackson's girlfriend Rebecca is a con artist. He goes to Rebecca's address and finds live security footage of various people, including Jackson. After being confronted by guards, Colter follows one to a conference where Rebecca is speaking to a cult led by a man named Seth. At the cult's commune, Colter agrees to meet Seth, who asks about Colter's father, before seeing Jackson. Jackson tells Colter he refuses to go home, so Colter gives him his number. Colter gets a text from Jackson to meet that night, but the cult leaders appear and tell him Jackson has been moved. Teddi tells Colter that Seth has photos of a former member he murdered when he tried to leave in his office. A cultist follows him, but Colter gains the upper hand and has the cultist drive him to Seth's office. He finds Jackson and shows him the photos, convincing him Rebecca is evil, but Rebecca finds them. Jackson tackles Rebecca, allowing Colter to get her gun. The cult leaders are arrested, and Jackson returns home.
3	3	"Springland"	Ken Olin	Elwood Reid	February 25, 2024	1NHU02	7.12
Near Cascade, Idaho, Colter sees a man confronting a woman for leaving a poster for her sister, vanlifer Mia Stine, on his car, with Colter getting stabbed when he intervenes. He meets Kira Stine and the sheriff, the latter of whom believes Mia simply left town. Colter finds a trail camera and calls Bobby, but is confronted by the man from before, who tells him Mia wasn't sleeping in her van. Colter suspects Matt Winslow, a resort heir and rock-climber, Mia had met. He goes to Matt's home, where he claims Mia ghosted him and gave him a note. Bobby tells Colter that Mia's van was found on the Winslow property. When Colter opens the van's door, he and Kira are shot at. He brings the sheriff to the van only to find it missing. Reenie arrives and tells Colter that a man who sued the Winslows died, and that Mia was set to testify. They confront Matt, who admits that his parents' driver killed the plaintiff. Colter accuses Matt's mother of killing Mia, which she admits to doing to prevent Matt from leaving Springland with her. Mia's body is found on Winslow's property, and Reenie tells Colter she got a call from Russell.
4	4	"Mt. Shasta"	Doug Aarniokoski	Steve Harper	March 3, 2024	1NHU03	7.61
Reenie's friend Erika believes her son Noah ran away from his boarding school, so Reenie calls Colter to investigate. Colter interviews the school's headmaster and security chief Ritter, who believes Noah relapsed and fled looking for drugs. Noah's friend tells Colter he saw Noah arguing with school employee Zeke, and security footage shows Noah in Zeke's van. Bobby finds Zeke made several phone calls to a home, so Colter visits the address and meets Noah's girlfriend. The girlfriend says Zeke snuck Noah out to confront her abusive ex-boyfriend and former drug dealer, Ray. Colter goes to the bar that Noah and Ray went to, and the bouncer says Ray drove after Noah and Zeke following an argument. Colter discovers Zeke was shot dead on a remote road and his crashed car nearby. He meets Ritter, and the two search for Noah before splitting. Colter encounters a wounded Noah and treats his injuries. Ritter is non-fatally shot by Ray, who finds Colter and Noah. Colter injures Ray in a shoot-out, and the two flee. Noah reunites with his mother, Ritter survives his injuries, and Colter leaves a memento for Noah for his survival skills before leaving for Manhattan, Kansas.
5	5	"St. Louis"	Gonzalo Amat	Travis Donnelly & Graham Thiel	March 17, 2024	1NHU05	7.55
16-year-old Stephanie Porter posts a reward to find a witness to testify at her father's second murder trial. Clay Porter was accused of killing his business partner, Avery Ingram after discovering him running an underground poker game. An anonymous comment on Stephanie's fundraiser claimed to witness the murder. Colter enters the poker game, but it's raided by the police. After Reenie Greene bails him out, Colter questions a woman from the game, who says her friend Mallory witnessed the murder. Clay says Mallory was Avery's girlfriend and describes her vehicle. Teddi says Mallory sold her car in Kansas City. Meanwhile, Clay is shanked by another inmate. Reenie learns from Clay's lawyer Loutreau that Stephanie has been emailing him. In Kansas City, Colter finds Mallory's address and heads to speak with Mallory, but is knocked out by her uncle. After Colter tells them his identity, Mallory identifies Avery's killer as Caesar Ashford and agrees to go back to St. Louis. Reenie tells Colter that Loutreau works for Caesar, but Loutreau kidnaps her. Realizing Loutreau and Caesar are tracking his phone, Colter heads to the meet point and knocks Caesar off the roof following a fight. Reenie is rescued, and with Mallory's testimony, Clay will be acquitted of murder.
6	6	"Lexington"	Marisol Adler	Sharon Lee Watson & Amanda Mortlock	March 24, 2024	1NHU06	7.28
Colter is tasked to find kidnapped racehorse Argo by its caretaker Hugh Laslow, one of its four owners. The kidnapper also stole documents that allow Argo to race. If the horse were to win an upcoming race, it would secure a spot in the Kentucky Derby. Colter runs into Billie, a rival tracker on the same mission. She previously betrayed him in Miami, stealing the reward money and fleeing. Colter encounters Billie at an event held by another co-owner, and the two break into a safe to no avail. Billie suggests teaming up, and Colter initially declines but changes his mind. Colter realizes the kidnapper rode Argo out of the farm. After questioning Argo's veterinarian, they investigate Argo's former trainer but find him murdered, with Colter finding a tranquilizer nearby. They learn Argo was sterile and couldn't race, determining he was kidnapped for insurance. Billie and Colter escape a burning barn. Bobby finds an address that leads them to Argo, but co-owner Stuart Tyler holds them hostage. They disarm him and return Argo to Hugh. Stuart and the vet, whom he was bribing, are arrested, and Argo's papers are found in Stuart's home, but the FBI freezes the bank account containing Billie and Colter's reward money.
7	7	"Chicago"	Aprill Winney	Ben H. Winters & Jai Franklin Sarki	March 31, 2024	1NHU07	6.80
Bobby asks Colter to find his friend, MMA fighter Sun Mai. Her gym's owner, Art Arfabo suspects she was deported, but ICE says they have no record of this. Sun's mother mentions immigration lawyer George Prine, who Teddi and Velma find is actually conman Mark Johnson. Colter confronts Johnson, who says Sun was kidnapped by loan sharks. Colter sneaks into their van. The van makes an unexpected stop to drop off the money. Colter has Bobby pick him up and follow the van, which Colter left his phone in. It leads them to an underground fighting ring, which Sun is part of. Bobby follows Colter inside without him knowing. Colter convinces Sun to leave, but one of the sharks holds him at gunpoint. Bobby helps subdue him, but Art, who was the ringleader of the fighting ring, appears and holds the three hostage. Colter manages to disarm Art, who flees but is cornered by Bobby in his vehicle. Art is arrested, as is Mark, and due to his fraud, Sun and her mother are eligible for U visas. Bobby offers to buy lunch for Colter and Reenie, but Colter leaves for a job in Sioux City.
8	8	"Camden"	Bethany Rooney	Travis Donnelly & Tegan Shohet	April 14, 2024	1NHU08	8.19
In Maine, Colter is tasked with finding missing dock worker Ethan "Sully" Sullivan, who vanished weeks before his wedding. His fiancée, Daniela, says she overheard him arguing with a co-worker, Ryan Hopkins. The sheriff finds Sully's car and a necklace, but Colter concludes he wasn't inside when it crashed. Colter speaks to Ryan, and Bobby confirms the necklace's owner as Sully's ex-girlfriend. Colter visits her home but finds her murdered. Colter learns Sully was speaking to a man named Dougie Clemons, and he becomes suspicious of diner owner Chelsea. Colter and the sheriff enter Clemons' home and find evidence of a scuffle. Teddi tells Colter that Sully and Clemons had previously been involved in a robbery together. Colter tails Chelsea and discovers Ryan and Clemons giving Sully a gun at a shipyard. He finds a warehouse where Sully moonlighted at and discovers a fentanyl robbery in progress. He finds Sully, whom Clemons forced to assist in the robbery by threatening Daniela. The gun they gave was unloaded and a test of loyalty, which he had failed. Sully takes another gun and leaves to kill Clemons, but Colter talks him down. Clemons and Ryan are arrested, and Daniela's father invites Colter to the wedding.
9	9	"Aurora"	Jon Huertas	Sharon Lee Watson	April 21, 2024	1NHU09	7.60
In Vermont, Jamie, a friend of missing teenager Lana Russo, is found drowned in a suspected suicide pact. Three years later, Lana's father, Gavin, requests Colter's help after seeing Lana in the background of a newspaper photo. Colter visits Harkwood, an abandoned mental hospital connected to a legend about a witch. Toby, an ex-classmate and member of the same film club as Lana and Jamie, suspects the Harkwood Witch killed them. Colter watches a video Toby filmed with the girls and determines that there was a person watching them. He returns to the hospital and finds a local transient, who says he only saw Lana and an unidentified person. Based on the description, the chief detective suspects it may be connected to a boy's murder from ten years prior. Colter interviews the murderer, Errol Price, who mentions the name Vic Pareema. He visits Price's sister Maeve, but realizes she is the accomplice, with Vic Pareema being an anagram for Maeve Price. He is able to restrain Maeve and finds Lana in a closet. After Maeve is arrested, the detective tells Colter that Maeve killed Jamie and had brought Lana to the county fair to avoid home inspectors.
10	10	"Into the Wild"	Larry Teng	Elwood Reid	April 28, 2024	1NHU10	7.70
Reenie visits Colter after a plane belonging to Gus McMillion, her father's friend, disappears in northern Idaho with his children, Maddie and Hank, and a client, Walter Bratton, inside. To find them, Colter skydives to the area where the plane last signaled. He finds the plane and a man dead by gunshot. Teddi tells Reenie that Bratton's car was registered to a fake name. Colter discovers a campsite and smashed smartphones. He calls Reenie, who finds a man who attempted to shoot Gus and fled by plane. Colter finds Maddie injured but alive. She says Hank is with Bratton, who was pursued by dealers he stole from, including the dead man. One dealer, Valtz, holds them at gunpoint in a ranger station until Maddie tells him Bratton is heading north to cabins in Canada. Colter and Reenie head to the cabins, where they discover several bodies, including Bratton. Colter finds Hank in one cabin just as Valtz arrives, forcing them to hide under the floor. Valtz notices them, but Colter shoots him first. The siblings return home, and Reenie invites Colter to go fishing sometime.
11	11	"Beyond the Campus Walls"	Joel Novoa	Travis Donnelly	May 5, 2024	1NHU11	7.64
Wyoming Science University student Blake Baker disappears after an off-campus party. His mother tells Colter her brother was diagnosed with schizophrenia when he was Blake's age. Colter visits his sister Dory, a professor, and gives her files on their father's murder. He speaks to Blake's professor Lyle Hewitt, who says he caught Blake copying research and revoked his lab access. Blake's friend Jada tells Colter that he was acting unusually and was at a party. Colter finds evidence that Blake was talking to a girl online, whom Bobby identifies as Irene Hertzel. Colter questions Irene, who says she was hired to catfish Blake for blackmail. Blake had arrived at Irene's business, where her husband Chuck put Blake in his car and drove off. Colter lures the client to a meeting, finding Blake's labmate Dex. Dex says Hewitt was the one falsifying data, and Blake had a flash drive with evidence. Dory determines Blake is in an old bomb shelter and brings Colter there. Hewitt kills Chuck and takes Blake hostage, but Colter shoots Hewitt in the shoulder. Hewitt and Dex are charged, Blake says he hid the drive in Jada's locker, and Colter fulfills an earlier promise to get dinner with Dory.
12	12	"Off the Books"	Clara Aranovich	Elwood Reid & Sharon Lee Watson	May 12, 2024	1NHU12	7.30
Russell visits Colter at his trailer and tells him he didn't kill their father. He asks for help finding an army friend, Doug Thompson, who ran away while getting gas in Roanoke, Virginia. His wife receives a package with a finger inside, which Bobby finds belongs to a recently deceased man, Len Klavens. The brothers break into the morgue but are arrested. After Reenie bails them out, Russell shows Colter a document he took showing where Klavens' body was found. They find the symbol from the package on the building, which is used for protective curses. The proprietors hold them at gunpoint, but the brothers disarm them and get the name Carlo Solano, which Russell connects to a job he did for Horizon contractors, where Doug killed Carlo's brother. They head to a safe house near Richmond and find a body. They break into a compound where Doug's kidnappers have him and rescue him. Russell tells Colter to return Doug home so he can take out Solano, which Colter reluctantly agrees to. Colter later visits Russell's motel, but learns he has already left but the owner gives Colter an envelope with Russell's pocket knife inside.
13	13	"The Storm"	Ken Olin	Elwood Reid & Sharon Lee Watson	May 19, 2024	1NHU13	7.65
In coastal Oregon, Colter's friend Lizzy Hawking asks him to find her daughter Katie and her boyfriend Dylan Fisher, amateur storm-trackers who vanished after a storm. After speaking to a friend, Colter heads into the water and finds Dylan's body. Sheriff Woods says Dylan drowned, but Colter believes he was murdered. Deputy Kelman mentions the Sampson brothers, whom Dylan fought with. Bobby tracks Katie's phone and finds she and Dylan were at an abandoned building days prior. Colter enters the building and finds the body of Haley Thomas, missing from Spokane. Colter deduces that the storm-trackers were trying to catch Thomas's killer. In Katie's home, Colter finds a voicemail from Vince Talbott, a rich out-of-towner whom Dylan and the Sampsons provided drugs to. He determines Thomas died at one of Talbott's parties. Colter notices Woods meeting Xavier Sampson, but Bo Sampson catches him. Bo admits he left Katie alive in the wilderness and lets Colter go. Colter finds Katie, but Woods holds Lizzy hostage. Kelman and Colter form a ruse to lure Woods outside, where the FBI arrests him. Elsewhere, the FBI arrests Talbott. Lizzy says her mother had files from Colter's father, but Lizzy sent them to Dory.

=== Season 2 (2024–25) ===
No. overall	No. in season	Title	Directed by	Written by	Original release date	Prod. code	U.S. viewers (millions)
14	1	"Out of the Past"	Ken Olin	Elwood Reid	October 13, 2024	2NHU01	8.31
Colter breaks into a house and confronts a man, Frank, whom he suspects is involved in the disappearance of a girl named Gina Picket. It is revealed that Colter has "visited" this man every year for ten years in search of Gina. Later, he investigates the case of a family disappearance in Pine Bluff, Arkansas. Initial suspicion was that the family had been kidnapped because the husband had recently won the lottery. Meanwhile, Reenie has set up her own law firm, and Velma is shown helping her set up the space where they work together to aid in Colter's missions. Reenie discovers that the wife was in the witness protection program. It turns out that the wife was in WITSEC for turning back on her ex-husband's crime family. With the help of US Marshals, Colter retrieves the family. Colter is later seen visiting the home of Gina's sister, who asks if there are updates. He tells her about a suspicious bag of dirt he finds in the man's freezer, which he believes to be connected to Gina in some way. The woman and Colter spend a romantic night together.
15	2	"Ontological Shock"	Aprill Winney	Sharon Lee Watson & Travis Donnelly	October 20, 2024	2NHU02	7.46
While tracking a missing man named Scott Palmer, on the hunt to find aliens, Colter goes missing. A worried Reenie calls in Colter's brother, Russell, to find him. Russell saves Colter, and the two team up to find the missing man. They discover the man's disappearance might be part of a government cover-up. In the end, they locate the man and bring him home to his daughter after Russell has an encounter with the abductor, who indicates Colter and Russell's Dad asked too many questions too.
16	3	"Bloodlines"	Doug Aarniokoski	Sharon Lee Watson & Travis Donnelly	October 27, 2024	2NHU03	8.49
Colter teams up again with fellow tracker, Billie, in her Nebraska hometown, looking for a young couple. The investigation leads them to a bio-hacking company that buys and sells blood. When police get involved, the original client cancels the job, and Billie decides to bow out of the investigation. As she drives away, a truck plows into her car, and she is taken to be held with the victim. Colter finds them and comes to the rescue.
17	4	"Noble Rot"	Aprill Winney	Alex Katsnelson & Amanda Mortlock	November 3, 2024	2NHU04	8.21
Reenie brings Colter to a Napa corporate retreat to search for the female head of a software company who appears to have been kidnapped. While searching the grounds for her, body parts start popping up.
18	5	"Preternatural"	Jeff T. Thomas	Ryan O'Nan & Annakate Chappell	November 10, 2024	2NHU05	8.41
Colter is hired to find a missing teenage girl named Emmaline, who recently moved to a mining town with her brother. After interviewing some of the townsfolk, Colter discovers that she is an herbalist and faith healer. It turns out Emmaline wandered onto the territory of the Drell Clan, drug dealers who wanted her to heal their father. Colter finds Emmaline, and they escape, only for Colter to take a bolt in the side. At the end of the episode, Colter goes to collect his reward, only to find that Emmaline and her brother have left town, leaving only his money and something for his wound.
19	6	"Trust Fall"	Jennifer Morrison	Travis Donnelly & Dominique A. Holmes	November 17, 2024	2NHU06	8.38
Colter is hired to find a group of four friends who disappeared during a camping trip. He finds one of them quickly, and while hiking to a waterfall that the other three were going to, he meets a retired cop named Keaton, who is determined to close a cold case. After Colter helps Keaton with his case, the latter tags along to help Colter finish his job. It turns out that the other three, Coop, Monika, and her husband, were involved in a hit and run, and Coop was about to come clean. Colter and Keaton stop Monika before she can throw Coop's body into a lake. At the end of the episode, Colter asks Keaton to look into the Picket case, and Reenie, who was in the area and helped a little, joins Colter for a drink.
20	7	"Man's Best Friend"	Ben Hernandez Bray	Alex Katsnelson & Jai Franklin Sarki	November 24, 2024	2NHU07	8.39
Colter finds a dog at a gas station and is able to lure him into his truck. After he returns from the station, he finds his car window smashed and the dog gone. He decides to check out the address from the dog's tags, and finds the door kicked in, and the owners tied up. They reveal that a masked man broke in, tied them up, and stole their dog. Colter finds the masked man's (Max) home and hooks up with a friend of his who is also looking for him. He fears Max has had a PTSD episode - and now they are searching for Max, his wife, and the dog. When they find him, they learn he is in search of stolen statues because his partner in the theft has kidnapped his wife pending the return of the statues.
21	8	"The Night Movers"	Ken Olin	Elwood Reid & Annakate Chappell	December 1, 2024	2NHU08	7.93
Colter takes on a case trying to find his client's dead brother. He quickly learns that the man is indeed alive and has made several visits to people he was in contact with. Colter follows the track to a woman who provided him with a fake ID and finds that her husband has been murdered. Together, they try to track him down and hit some twists and turns in the process.
22	9	"The Disciple"	Bethany Rooney	Sharon Lee Watson & Amanda Mortlock	February 16, 2025	2NHU09	6.48
Colter meets again with Keaton, who has made some progress in their search for Gina. Together they investigate a guy named Frank who was with Gina the night she disappeared, and he leads them to where he had taken her at the direction of his "Teacher". There they find a body (not Gina) and video tapes - one of Gina with the killer. Slowly, they uncover a ring of abduction and are finally able to close the cold case that has haunted Colter.
23	10	"Nightingale"	Jon Huertas	Ryan O'Nan & Dominique A. Holmes	February 23, 2025	2NHU10	8.24
A singer/musician named Angie goes missing after leaving a bar where she performed. Colter gets hired to find a missing grandson in the same town, and soon, he learns their paths crossed. He runs up against resistance from the local sheriff and a biker gang who have recently lost two members in a fight. It becomes hard to tell the good guys from the bad as his investigation progresses. Colter is assisted by Bobby's cousin Randy, who is also a skilled hacker.
24	11	"Shades of Gray"	Darren Grant	Travis Donnelly & Jordan Goodman	March 2, 2025	2NHU11	7.07
Reenie and Elliott get Colter hired by a woman named Ivy whose son, Matt, is having an affair with a married woman, and has gone missing. Colter finds Matt's girlfriend tied up and she tells him that Matt was kidnapped, and had previously warned her not to call the police if anything happened to him. The trail leads him to see that Ivy is involved with rival mafias and Matt was resisting it, and was taken by the other side. When Ivy receives a ransom call, Colter has to rush to save them both.
25	12	"Monster"	Tyne Rafaeli	Alex Katsnelson & Annakate Chappell	March 9, 2025	2NHU12	7.86
Colter Shaw is enlisted to help locate a missing mother who vanished after tucking in her young son, who was afraid of "monsters." As Colter investigates, he traces her phone and uncovers disturbing clues, eventually leading him to Alice's colleague's body. Inside the house, he finds therapy notes that reveal a chilling motive behind Alice's abduction. Colter asks Reenie for help and discovers that the missing woman had studied psychiatry but never obtained her license, though she had helped several patients. Realizing the kidnapper's delusional intentions, Colter races against time to rescue her before it's too late. Meanwhile, Alice fights for her life using the skills she gained from her psychiatry training.
26	13	"Neptune"	Lee Rose	Sharon Lee Watson & Ryan O'Nan	March 16, 2025	2NHU13	8.51
Tracker is asked to find Clare Dillard, who disappeared from a New York City dressing room. Colter speaks to her husband, Logan, who receives an alert of a burglary at their home. Colter arrives at the publishing company Clare works at, but finds five employees dead, with CEO Eileen Turner the only other one missing. After evading two armed cleaners, Colter determines that Clare was involved in espionage. Randy is hacked and Logan kidnapped; when Colter visits Logan's hotel room, he receives a threatening phone message. While following a suspicious busboy, Colter notices Clare in the parking garage. She explains to Colter that her section was compromised, and she realized Eileen was a mole. Eileen calls Clare to a meeting, where Eileen says she will release Logan if Clare helps her move a satellite. Colter gets to the kidnappers' house, killing the cleaners and rescuing Logan. After moving the satellite, Clare disarms Eileen and holds her at gunpoint. Colter convinces her to stand down. Reenie is sent a letter from a security official thanking Colter for his service, and Logan gets a note from Clare saying she will be waiting for him in Fiji.
27	14	"Exodus"	Lionel Coleman	Travis Donelly & Dominique A. Holmes	March 23, 2025	2NHU14	7.80
28	15	"The Grey Goose"	Ken Olin	Annakate Chappell & Jai Franklin Sarki	March 30, 2025	2NHU15	8.44
Colter returns to Aurora, Vermont to investigate an escaped prisoner who escaped during a medical transfer. The prisoner injured one guard and kidnapped another, who is also the niece of a detective who investigated the Lana Russo case. Billie goes undercover in the prison to investigate if someone there was involved, while Colter finds evidence that the kidnapped guard may be involved herself.
29	16	"The Mercy Seat"	David M. Barrett	Elwood Reid & Sharon Lee Watson	April 13, 2025	2NHU16	8.23
30	17	"Memories"	Yangzom Brauen	Alex Katnelson & Amanda Morlock	April 20, 2025	2NHU17	7.63
31	18	"Collision"	Joel Novoa	Travis Donnelly & Ryan O'Nan	April 27, 2025	2NHU18	7.67
32	19	"Rules of the Game"	Nimisha Mukerji	Sharon Lee Watson & Dominique A. Holmes	May 4, 2025	2NHU19	8.22
33	20	"Echo Ridge"	Ken Olin	Elwood Reid	May 11, 2025	2NHU20	8.27

=== Season 3 (2025–26) ===
No. overall	No. in season	Title	Directed by	Written by	Original release date	Prod. code	U.S. viewers (millions)
34	1	"The Process"	Ken Olin	Elwood Reid	October 19, 2025	3NHU01	8.03
Randy takes over for Bobby in assisting Colter. After getting into a fight at a bar in Larimer County, Colorado, Colter and Russell team up with a man to investigate the disappearance of his ex-wife and daughter, Lisa and Hailey Rodgers. They find Lisa's conman husband dead in the home. After hearing a report of a carjacking, Colter locates Lisa at a shopping plaza. She flees, but is struck and injured by a car, and Colter finds a disappearing text message telling her to deliver a package. Randy tracks the texts to a rock quarry and determines the sender is a local teacher. The brothers find the teacher and force him to disclose Hailey's location; he does so, but says his sister has been kidnapped and that the kidnappers said he was "part of The Process". The teacher is arrested and Hailey reunited with her father, but Reenie informs Colter that the teacher's sister was found dead in Denver. Shortly after, the brothers receive texts warning them that they have interrupted The Process.
35	2	"Leverage"	Jeff T. Thomas	Sharon Lee Watson	October 26, 2025	3NHU02	7.90
The teacher is murdered by a jail guard shortly after Reenie tries to interview him. Colter learns about The Process, where people with secrets are blackmailed into committing crimes or risk their loved ones murdered, a system that has operated for over a decade. After intercepting one victim, who was tasked with killing Russell, the brothers fake Russell's murder and the victim's next kidnapping. Colter learns The Process was created by a psychology professor, who ended the experiment for ethical reasons, but three of her graduate students continued it. Russell kills one of the students and Colter apprehends another, though the third is not found. The brothers destroy the server with algorithm that runs The Process, ending it.
36	3	"First Fire"	Aprill Winney	Ryan O'Nan & Annakate Chappell	November 2, 2025	3NHU03	8.85
A man escapes from a psychiatric facility on Halloween. Colter is hired by his parents to track him down, as they believe their son is dangerous and might hurt more people. Colter worries that he might be targeting one of his former victims, a young woman he'd been obsessed with before being committed. His investigation leads him to a connection between the missing man and a community outreach group at a local convent.
37	4	"No Man's Land"	Joel Novoa	Alex Katsnelson & Travis Donnelly	November 9, 2025	3NHU04	7.97
A woman in a small Texas town hires Colter to find a man who disappeared from his hotel room. He quickly discovers that the woman is really the sheriff's wife and that she was having an affair with the missing man. Two deputies kidnap Colter and take him into the desert to kill him. He escapes, but has to make it back to civilization on his own without supplies. While he initially thinks the sheriff is behind the whole situation, Colter begins to realize that something much more complicated is happening under the surface, involving a young man seeking revenge against a crime boss.
38	5	"The Old Ways"	Darren Grant	Elwood Reid & Dominque A. Holmes	November 16, 2025	3NHU05	7.72
39	6	"Angel"	Bethany Rooney	Sharon Lee Watson & Brian McCauley Johnson	November 23, 2025	3NHU06	8.14
Colter is hired to find a crime scene cleaner named Margo Webster, who is also a true crime buff. He eventually discovers that she was part of an amateur detective group, along with two men named Gunther and Eddie. The three men revisit the site of Margo's most recent job and discover that someone has been hiding in the house. They eventually realize that a string of unrelated deaths, all involving a patient and caregiver duo, are the work of an angel of mercy named Francis. Francis kidnapped Margo because she and her friends were getting too close to the truth. He is eventually thwarted by Colter. In the end, the detective group offer Colter a spot, and when he refuses, offer to serve as consultants.
40	7	"Eat the Rich"	Rob Seidenglanz	Travis Donnelly & Jai Franklin Sarki	November 30, 2025	3NHU07	N/A
41	8	"Eurydice"	Joel Novoa	Ryan O'Nan & Amanda Mortlock	December 7, 2025	3NHU08	N/A
When a young girl goes missing, her mother is suspected of murdering her. A year later, the missing girl's dress appears in her mother's backyard and she hires Colter to find out if her daughter is still alive. While Reenie works to keep the mother out of legal trouble, Colter investigates the girl's disappearance. What at first appears to be a simple kidnapping quickly evolves into a much more complicated situation, with Colter uncovering a potential link to the police department as he digs deeper.
42	9	"Good Trouble"	Jeff T. Thomas	Elwood Reid & Sharon Lee Watson	December 14, 2025	3NHU09	N/A
An old friend of Colter's, a retired police chief, requests his help in finding his former partner who has gone missing. The search lead them to tangle with an organized crime family, and in the chase they find the partner dying from a car accident. His last words lead them to the wife of someone murdered years ago. Soon Colter and the retired chief find themselves pursued, shot at and run off the road, and the episode ends with their car dropping into a gorge.
43	10	"The Fallout"	Ken Olin	Travis Donnelly & Annakate Chappell	March 1, 2026	3NHU10	N/A
44	11	"To the Bone"	Jon Huertas	Alex Katsnelson & Jordan Goodman	March 8, 2026	3NHU11	N/A
45	12	"Do No Harm"	Aprill Winney	Ryan O'Nan & Brian McCauley Johnson	March 15, 2026	3NHU12	N/A
46	13	"Breakaway"	David M. Barrett	Travis Donnelly & Dominique A. Holmes	March 22, 2026	3NHU13	N/A
47	14	"The Field Trip"	Melissa Hickey	Elwood Reid & Annakate Chapell	March 29, 2026	3NHU14	N/A
48	15	"No Good Deed"	Tori Garrett	Sharon Lee Watson & Thomas Heminger	April 5, 2026	3NHU15	N/A
49	16	"Struck"	Ben Hernandez Bray	Alex Katnelson & Amanda Mortlock	April 12, 2026	3NHU16	N/A
50	17	"Daughters"	Joel Novoa	Ryan O'Nan & Jai Franklin Sarki	April 19, 2026	3NHU17	N/A
51	18	"Alaskan Wild"	David M. Barrett	Travis Donnelly & Dominique A. Holmes	April 26, 2026	3NHU18	N/A
52	19	"Chain of Custody"	Nimisha Mukerji	Annakate Chappell & Neda Davarpanah	May 3, 2026	3NHU19	N/A
53	20	"Reclamation"	Darren Grant	Alex Katsnelson & Dominique A. Holmes	May 10, 2026	3NHU20	N/A
54	21	"Chrono Stasis"	Jeff T. Thomas	Sharon Lee Watson & Amanda Mortlock	May 17, 2026	3NHU21	N/A
55	22	"The Best Ones"	Ken Olin	Elwood Reid & Travis Donnelly	May 24, 2026	3NHU22	N/A

=== Season 4 (2026) ===
No. overall	No. in season	Title	Directed by	Written by	Original release date	Prod. code	U.S. viewers (millions)
56	1	"Safe Harbor"	Joel Novoa	Alex Katnelson & Annakate Chappell	October 4, 2026	4NHU03	N/A
57	2	"Switchback"	Jeff T. Thomas	Travis Donnelly & Ryan O'Nan	October 11, 2026	4NHU02	N/A
58	3	"Original Parts"	Ken Olin	Elwood Reid	October 18, 2026	4NHU01	N/A
59	4	"Purification"	Tori Garrett	Sharon Lee Watson & Dominique A. Holmes	October 25, 2026	4NHU04	TBD
60	5	"Need to Know"	David M. Barrett	Brian McCauley Johnson & Jai Franklin Sarki	November 1, 2026	4NHU05	TBD
61	6	"Blind Spot"	Jeff T. Thomas	Travis Donnelly & Amanda Mortlock	November 15, 2026	4NHU06	TBD
62	7	"That's The Job"	Joel Novoa	Alex Katsnelson & Jordan Goodman	November 22, 2026	TBA	TBD
63	8	"Hide and Seek"	Melissa Hickey	Annakate Chappell & Neda Davarpanah	November 29, 2026	TBA	TBD
64	9	"The Retreat"	Larry Teng	Sharon Lee Watson & Ryan O'Nan	December 6, 2026	TBA	TBD

== Ratings ==
=== Season 1 ===
Viewership and ratings per episode of List of Tracker episodes
No.	Title	Air date	Rating/share (18–49)	Viewers (millions)	DVR (18–49)	DVR viewers (millions)	Total (18–49)	Total viewers (millions)	Ref.
1	"Klamath Falls"	February 11, 2024	3.94	18.44	—N/a	—N/a	—N/a	—N/a	
2	"Missoula"	February 18, 2024	0.46/5	6.87	—N/a	—N/a	—N/a	—N/a	
3	"Springland"	February 25, 2024	0.48/5	7.12	—N/a	—N/a	—N/a	—N/a	
4	"Mt. Shasta"	March 3, 2024	0.50/6	7.61	—N/a	—N/a	—N/a	—N/a	
5	"St. Louis"	March 17, 2024	0.47/6	7.55	0.38	3.71	0.85	11.27	
6	"Lexington"	March 24, 2024	0.54/5	7.28	0.24	2.60	0.78	9.88	
7	"Chicago"	March 31, 2024	0.54/6	6.80	0.27	3.07	0.81	9.87	
8	"Camden"	April 14, 2024	0.56/7	8.19	0.28	2.94	0.84	11.13	
9	"Aurora"	April 21, 2024	0.42/4	7.60	0.34	3.72	0.76	11.32	
10	"Into the Wild"	April 28, 2024	0.45/5	7.70	0.34	3.58	0.79	11.27	
11	"Beyond the Campus Walls"	May 5, 2024	0.43/5	7.64	0.35	3.51	0.78	11.15	
12	"Off the Books"	May 12, 2024	0.42/4	7.30	0.44	3.80	0.85	11.11	
13	"The Storm"	May 19, 2024	0.46/5	7.65	—N/a	—N/a	—N/a	—N/a	

=== Season 2 ===
Viewership and ratings per episode of List of Tracker episodes
No.	Title	Air date	Rating/share (18–49)	Viewers (millions)	DVR (18–49)	DVR viewers (millions)	Total (18–49)	Total viewers (millions)	Ref.
1	"Out of the Past"	October 13, 2024	0.54/5	8.31	—N/a	—N/a	—N/a	—N/a	
2	"Ontological Shock"	October 20, 2024	0.49/4	7.46	0.32	3.32	0.81	10.78	
3	"Bloodlines"	October 27, 2024	0.53/5	8.49	0.28	3.11	0.81	11.59	
4	"Noble Rot"	November 3, 2024	0.47/4	8.21	0.30	3.12	0.77	11.30	
5	"Preternatural"	November 10, 2024	0.63/6	8.41	0.30	3.46	0.93	11.86	
6	"Trust Fall"	November 17, 2024	0.62/6	8.38	0.24	3.32	0.87	11.70	
7	"Man's Best Friend"	November 24, 2024	0.46/4	8.39	0.27	3.19	0.73	11.58	
8	"The Night Movers"	December 1, 2024	0.53/5	7.93	0.23	2.89	0.76	10.81	
9	"The Disciple"	February 16, 2025	0.36/4	6.48	0.30	3.53	0.67	10.01	
10	"Nightingale"	February 23, 2025	0.43/6	8.24	0.25	2.86	0.68	11.10	
11	"Shades of Gray"	March 2, 2025	0.43/5	7.07	0.26	3.02	0.69	10.09	
12	"Monster"	March 9, 2025	0.41/6	7.86	0.23	2.81	0.65	10.68	
13	"Neptune"	March 16, 2025	0.56/8	8.51	0.23	2.77	0.78	11.27	
14	"Exodus"	March 23, 2025	0.48/5	7.80	0.19	2.63	0.67	10.43	
15	"The Grey Goose"	March 30, 2025	0.63/9	8.44	0.25	2.57	0.88	11.00	
16	"The Mercy Seat"	April 13, 2025	0.51/7	8.23	0.21	2.65	0.71	10.89	
17	"Memories"	April 20, 2025	0.47/7	7.63	0.24	2.88	0.71	10.52	
18	"Collision"	April 27, 2025	0.32/4	7.67	0.22	2.65	0.54	10.32	
19	"Rules of the Game"	May 4, 2025	0.38/5	8.22	0.21	2.65	0.59	10.88	
20	"Echo Ridge"	May 11, 2025	0.50/7	8.27	0.20	2.86	0.70	11.12	

=== Season 3 ===
Viewership and ratings per episode of List of Tracker episodes
No.	Title	Air date	Rating/share (18–49)	Viewers (millions)	DVR (18–49)	DVR viewers (millions)	Total (18–49)	Total viewers (millions)	Ref.
1	"The Process"	October 19, 2025	0.45/5	8.03	0.15	2.13	0.60	10.17	
2	"Leverage"	October 26, 2025	0.54/5	7.90	0.23	2.76	0.77	10.65	
3	"First Fire"	November 2, 2025	0.60/6	8.85	0.21	2.97	0.80	11.82	
4	"No Man's Land"	November 9, 2025	0.41/4	7.97	0.16	2.66	0.57	10.63	
5	"The Old Ways"	November 16, 2025	0.56/5	7.72	TBD	TBD	TBD	TBD	
6	"Angel"	November 23, 2025	0.42/5	8.14	TBD	TBD	TBD	TBD	
