= Allen Sunshine =

- Theatrical release poster
- Directed by: Harley Chamandy
- Written by: Harley Chamandy
- Produced by: Chantal Chamandy; Laurent Allaire
- Starring: Vincent Leclerc
- Cinematography: Kenny Suleimanagich
- Music by: Ethan Rose
- Production companies: Mother and Son Films; Chasseurs Films
- Release date: November 12, 2024
- Running time: 75 minutes
- Countries: Canada; United States
- Language: English

Allen Sunshine is a 2024 drama film written and directed by Montreal-born filmmaker Harley Chamandy and produced through Mother and Son Films and Chasseurs Films by Chantal Chamandy and Laurent Allaire. Shot on Super 16 mm, the film earned the 2024 Werner Herzog Film Award after premiering internationally at the 41st Munich International Film Festival. The film was released on digital platforms worldwide on 12 November 2024.

== Plot ==
Former music-industry mogul Allen Sunshine (Vincent Leclerc) retreats to a secluded lakeside cabin after the suicide of his wife and artistic protégé, the singer Eloise Hayes. Accompanied only by his dog and a stock of analogue synths, Allen records the sounds of wind and water to weave into tentative new compositions while wrestling with guilt and creativity. His isolation is gradually broken when two irreverent locals, Dustin (Miles Phoenix Foley) and Kevin (Liam Quiring-Nkindi), start dropping by, followed by the compassionate delivery man Bill (Joseph Whitebird) and old friend Jocelyn (Catherine Souffront).

== Cast ==
- Vincent Leclerc as Allen Sunshine
- Miles Phoenix Foley as Dustin
- Liam Quiring-Nkindi as Kevin
- Catherine Souffront as Jocelyn
- Joseph Whitebird as Bill
- Renaud Lacelle-Bourdon as Allen's brother

== Production ==
Chamandy drafted the script when he was nineteen and shot the feature at twenty-two. Cinematographer Kenny Suleimanagich operated a single Arri 416 camera on location around Georgeville, while composer Ethan Rose built an ambient score from field recordings captured on set that mirrored the protagonist's creative process. Principal photography lasted 18 days in late summer 2022.

== Release ==
Allen Sunshine had its world première at the Munich International Film Festival. U.S. distribution followed through self-booking and event screenings beginning 13 November 2024 at New York's Village East, while day-and-date digital release on Apple TV and other VOD outlets began in November 2024.

== Reception ==
Writing for The Guardian, Phil Hoad praised the film's "cleansing plainness" and an "aura of benevolence" rare in contemporary drama. Paper magazine hailed Allen Sunshine as "an ode to optimism in a time of anxiety," positioning Chamandy as "an auteur to watch", while Document Journal highlighted its "meditative journey of transformation" and its fusion of electronic sound design with natural imagery. Writing for Washington Square News, Chloe Haack hailed Allen Sunshine as "a beacon of optimism," praising its "warm, nostalgic aesthetic" on 16 mm and its "gentle art of healing" approach to grief. Jordan Raup of The Film Stage described the drama as "an affecting, understated look at picking up a life destroyed" and lauded Chamandy's "painterly" 16 mm imagery, calling the 75-minute debut "a full-bodied exploration of grief with a world of feeling".

== Awards ==
The film received the Werner Herzog Film Award in 2024, along with the TRT First Cut+ Award for best work-in-progress at the Karlovy Vary International Film Festival in 2023, and the Young Jury Award and Best Sound Design at the 2024 Festival du Film Canadien de Dieppe in France.
