= Harley Chamandy =

Canadian filmmaker

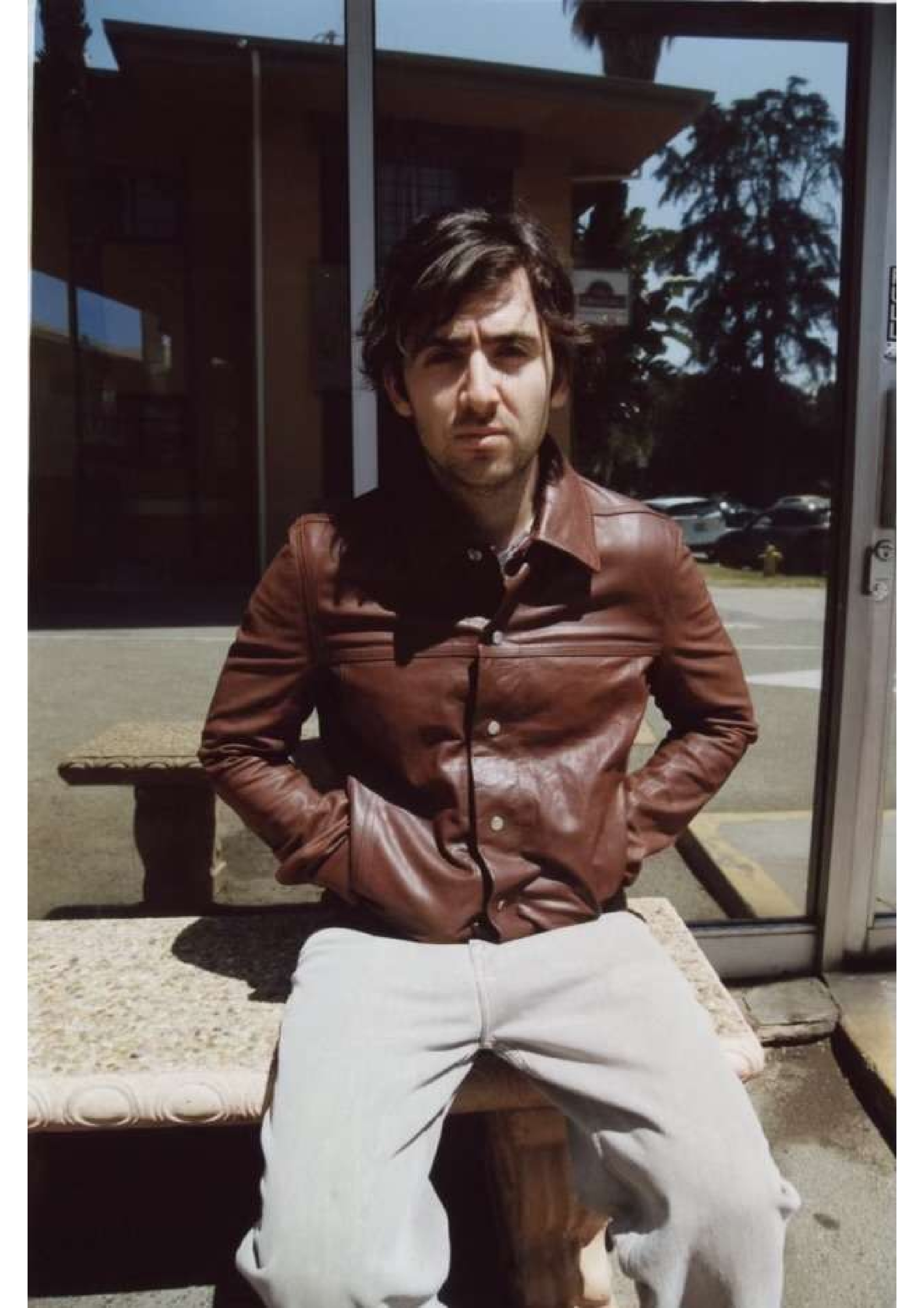
- Born: Montreal, Quebec, Canada
- Education: New York University
- Occupation: Filmmaker
- Mother: Chantal Chamandy

Harley Chamandy is a Canadian filmmaker who is known for writing and directing Allen Sunshine (2024), his debut feature film. Chamandy won the Werner Herzog Film Award in 2024 for Allen Sunshine.

== Early life and education ==
Chamandy was born in Montreal to a family of Lebanese and Greek-Egyptian heritage. His mother, Chantal Chamandy, is a singer who emigrated from Egypt to Canada. His maternal grandfather is a pianist. Chamandy began making short films at a young age and briefly worked as a child actor, appearing in a Syfy network TV movie and other minor roles.

At 17, his short film Mirage (2017) led to his participation in a ten-day workshop led by Werner Herzog at Cuba's Escuela Internacional de Cine y Televisión, where he was the youngest participant.

Chamandy attended New York University (NYU) and graduated with a degree in global liberal studies with a minor in producing, creative writing and Italian. He has cited a NYU seminar on visual culture, which included works like Roland Barthes’s Camera Lucida, as an influence.

== Career ==
At the age of 17, Chamandy directed the short film The Final Act of Joey Jumbler (2018) and worked with cinematographer Stéphanie Weber Biron on the project. The film was produced by his mother. In 2022, he wrote and directed the short film Where It’s Beautiful When It Rains.

His feature-film debut, Allen Sunshine (2024), which he wrote and directed, follows a reclusive music producer in rural Quebec. The film was shot on 16 mm stock in Quebec's Eastern Townships. His mother served as a lead producer through their company, Mother and Son Films, alongside Canadian co-producer Laurent Allaire of Chasseurs Films. The cinematographer, Kenny Suleimanagich, provided his own 16 mm camera for the production.

During post-production, Allen Sunshine was selected for the Karlovy Vary International Film Festival’s Eastern Promises industry program, where it won the First Cut+ Award in 2023. Academy Award-winning producer Alex Coco later joined the project as an executive producer. The film premiered at the 41st Munich International Film Festival in June 2024. The film subsequently screened theatrically in New York, Miami, London, Munich, Toronto, Halifax and P.E.I.

== Filmography ==
Short films

- Mirage (2016)
- The Final Act of Joey Jumbler (2018)
- The Maids Will Come on Monday (2019)
- Where It's Beautiful When It Rains (2022)

Feature films

- Allen Sunshine (2024)

== Recognition ==
In July 2023, Allen Sunshine won the First Cut+ Award at Karlovy Vary's Eastern Promises industry forum.

In 2024, Chamandy received the Werner Herzog Film Award for Allen Sunshine, becoming the award's youngest recipient at age 25. Chamandy accepted the award in Munich in December 2024. In the same year, Allen Sunshine was included as one of the best films of 2024 by The Film Stage.
