= Romantically Challenged =

2010 American TV series

- Genre: Sitcom
- Created by: Ricky Blitt
- Directed by: James Burrows
- Starring: Alyssa Milano; Josh Lawson; Kyle Bornheimer; Kelly Stables
- Composer: Daniel Licht
- Country of origin: United States
- Original language: English
- No. of seasons: 1
- No. of episodes: 7 (3 unaired)

Production
- Executive producer: Ricky Blitt
- Camera setup: Multi-camera
- Running time: 30 minutes
- Production companies: Candy Bar Productions; Bonanza Productions; Warner Bros. Television

Original release
- Network: ABC
- Release: April 19 – May 17, 2010

Romantically Challenged is an American sitcom television series that aired on ABC from April 19, 2010, to May 17, 2010. The series is set in Pittsburgh and was created by Ricky Blitt, who is also the show's head writer. It stars Alyssa Milano. On May 16, 2010, ABC officially canceled the series; six episodes were produced, but only four aired.

== Premise ==
Milano plays Rebecca Thomas, a recently divorced single mom attorney in Pittsburgh who hasn't dated "since Bill Clinton was president". The show will follow her transition from family life to primary bread winner. Milano had stated that the show would most likely be on beyond the 9 p.m. time slot, probably following Dancing with the Stars, saying: "I don't know if it's an 8 o'clock show . . . There are a lot of jokes about sex."

== Cast and characters ==
=== Main cast ===
- Alyssa Milano as Rebecca Thomas
- Kyle Bornheimer as Perry Gill
- Josh Lawson as Shawn Goldwater
- Kelly Stables as Lisa Thomas
- Israel Broussard as Justin Thomas
- Sierra McCormick as Scout Thomas

== Episodes ==
No.	Title	Directed by	Written by	Original release date	Prod. code	U.S. viewers (millions)
1	"Don't Be Yourself"	James Burrows	Ricky Blitt	April 19, 2010	2J5351	10.67
Perry goes to Rebecca's sister Lisa for advice, but this results in an awkward moment for him. Shawn is forced to help Justin with a school paper. Instead of helping him though, he gives Justin an old paper he has written himself, and is offended when it turns out the paper did not earn an A grade for Justin.
2	"The Charade"	James Burrows	Ricky Blitt	April 26, 2010	2J5353	9.06
Rebecca is appalled that her sister is dumping a guy she spent a date with because he is too nice. Rebecca tries to set them up again, but soon finds out it is maybe for the better that Lisa is not seeing him any longer. Meanwhile, Shawn forgets to pick up Perry from the dentist because he has met a girl on the streets. As a result, Perry feels neglected and breaks off their friendship.
3	"Perry and Rebecca's High School Reunion"	James Burrows	Ricky Blitt	May 3, 2010	2J5355	9.64
Rebecca intends to confront the guy who stood her up for the senior prom, but Perry makes up a lie so she won't find out the real reason why she was stood up. Shawn can't watch the championship games on his cable company, so he romances Lisa's friend, Vanessa, whose cable company is airing the games.
4	"Rebecca's One Night Stand"	James Burrows	Ted Cohen & Andrew Reich	May 17, 2010	2J5354	N/A
Lisa finally convinces Rebecca to have her first one-night stand. But the always polite Rebecca violates Lisa's number-one rule by calling her date, Leo, the morning after. Now Leo is into Rebecca, so Lisa gives her sister her own unusual brand of dating advice so Rebecca can break up with him. Meanwhile, an overworked Perry decides to take a stay-cation. But doing so gets on the nerves of his unemployed roommate, Shawn, to the point that Shawn decides to get a job.
5	"Perry Dates His Assistant"	James Burrows	Ted Cohen & Andrew Reich	Unaired	2J5352	N/A
Rebecca tries to take her relationship to the next level but when she discovers a giant tattoo, she changes her mind. Perry tries to fire Erin, his assistant but ends up in a relationship with her. Shawn doesn't want to watch Lisa's coworkers cute dog, until he discovers what a great chick magnet the dog is.
6	"Hey Now Hey Now Perry's Girlfriend's Back"	N/A	N/A	Unaired	2J5356	N/A
7	"Rebecca's Spunky Little Sister"	N/A	N/A	Unaired	2J5357	N/A

== Development and production ==
In January 2009, ABC announced a put pilot commitment with Ricky Blitt for a new comedy. Initially titled Threesome, the pilot revolved around a single 30-something man who is caught between his lazy best friend roommate and his single-mother girlfriend. Eric Christian Olsen was the first actor cast, in the leading role of Shawn. In early March 2009, it was reported that Alyssa Milano would also star in the comedy pilot as Shawn's girlfriend Rebecca. On why she accepted the role, Milano commented:

I was so attracted to the writing. Our creative showrunner is Ricky Blitt from Family Guy and I was struck at how funny the female characters were written. Usually the female characters are written pretty straightforward, like the straight-man but with Ricky’s writing, the women get to be equally as funny. That was what hooked me. James Burrows, who's our director, is another major part of what attracted me to the show. It just seemed like a really good package and something that I could commit to in the long-term.

The cast was filled in mid-March with the casting of Kyle Bornheimer as Shawn's roommate Perry, and Kelly Stables as Lisa, the best friend to Milano's character.

At the end of March, ABC announced the show as Single With Baggage in its 2009 program development guide, and finally as Romantically Challenged in May. In addition, in August 2009 the role of Lisa was described as Rebecca's sister instead of her best friend.

Also in August 2009, ABC announced Romantically Challenged was scheduled for a midseason 2010 run of 13 episodes. In November, this was decreased to a seven episode commitment. Meanwhile, producers chose to recast the role of Shawn, replacing Olsen with Josh Lawson. Filming started in January 2010 with James Burrows as director. Shooting took place at the old Seinfeld stage.

Romantically Challenged was initially scheduled for an April 12, 2010 premiere, but ABC delayed the start to April 19 to allow for a two-hour Dancing with the Stars episode.

== Setting ==
Milano has told the press that Pittsburgh was selected since the creator and executive producer Blitt wanted the show set in a "small-town city", and that he is also a "huge Pittsburgh Penguins fan". Director Burrows also endorsed Pittsburgh since his positive experience filming parts of the former sitcom Back to You in the city.

== Reception ==
=== Critical reception ===
The show's early reviews were mixed. It scored an average of 44 on Metacritic based on 15 reviews. An Entertainment Weekly critic wrote of the opening episodes: "At times relatably funny: The rules of one-night stands can be fairly confusing. But other times, characters say things like 'Who is that mansicle?'" Others were praising the performance of Milano but gave a negative review of the show, like USA Today: "As terrible as Romantically is, it is in the end more puzzling than insulting. Why would any studio or network waste a star like Milano on a show that would seem to have virtually no chance of survival?"

=== Ratings ===
The pilot delivered 'average ratings', with a total of 10.7 million viewers. Although a reasonable amount at another timeslot, the show's future was already feared to be cut short due to its lead-in from Dancing with the Stars, which captured 20.8 million viewers. The four aired episode averaged on 9.57 million viewers per episode and ranked 35th in total viewers and 59th in Adults 18–49 rating and share.
