= Contagious (film) =

1997 American television film

- Genre: Thriller
- Written by: Sandy Kroopf
- Directed by: Joe Napolitano
- Starring: Lindsay Wagner; Elizabeth Peña
- Music by: Stephen Graziano
- Country of origin: United States
- Original language: English language

Production
- Producer: Mary Eilts
- Production location: Vancouver
- Cinematography: Andreas Poulsson
- Editor: Tim Tommasino
- Running time: 103 minutes

Original release
- Release: January 22, 1997

Contagious is a 1997 American television film directed by Joe Napolitano and starring Lindsay Wagner as a doctor trying to prevent a cholera epidemic following an outbreak.

== Plot ==
A plane where shrimp tainted with cholera was served, arrives from South America to Los Angeles. Soon after, the first patient dies. Because this person was a cocaine dealer, there is some suspicion that the drugs may be infected with the disease. Therefore, a narcotics detective (Elizabeth Peña) is put on the case, while in the hospital an experienced doctor (Lindsay Wagner) tries to prevent the outbreak from turning into an epidemic.

== Cast ==
- Lindsay Wagner as Dr. Hannah Cole
- Elizabeth Peña as Detective Luisa Rojas
- Ken Pogue as George Ryburn
- Brendan Fletcher as Brian
- Tom Wopat as Sam
- Alexandra Purvis as Julie
- Matt Hill as Carl Freedman
- Gerard Plunkett as Sklar
- Jon Cuthbert as Vic
- Bill Croft as Gerard
- Jed Rees as Doug Lamoreaux
- Karen Elizabeth Austin as Norma Meyers
- P. Lynn Johnson as Jamie West
- David Lovgren as Tom Carlen
