= Deadpool (film) =

2016 film by Tim Miller

- Theatrical release poster
- Directed by: Tim Miller
- Written by: Rhett Reese; Paul Wernick
- Based on: Deadpool by: Fabian Nicieza; Rob Liefeld
- Produced by: Simon Kinberg; Ryan Reynolds; Lauren Shuler Donner
- Starring: Ryan Reynolds; Morena Baccarin; Ed Skrein; T.J. Miller; Gina Carano; Brianna Hildebrand
- Cinematography: Ken Seng
- Edited by: Julian Clarke
- Music by: Tom Holkenborg
- Production companies: 20th Century Fox; Marvel Entertainment; Kinberg Genre; The Donners' Company
- Distributed by: 20th Century Fox
- Release dates: February 8, 2016 (Le Grand Rex); February 12, 2016 (United States)
- Running time: 108 minutes
- Country: United States
- Language: English
- Budget: $58 million
- Box office: $782.6 million

Deadpool is a 2016 American superhero film based on the Marvel Comics character Wade Wilson / Deadpool. Directed by Tim Miller, in his feature directorial debut, and written by Rhett Reese and Paul Wernick, it is a spin-off of the X-Men film series and its overall eighth installment. Ryan Reynolds stars as the titular character, alongside Morena Baccarin, Ed Skrein, T.J. Miller, Gina Carano, and Brianna Hildebrand. In the film, Wade Wilson hunts the man responsible for giving him mutant abilities and a scarred physical appearance, becoming the antihero Deadpool.

Following a greenlight from 20th Century Fox in 2014 after test footage for a potential film was leaked, principal photography took place in Vancouver, British Columbia, between March and May 2015. Several vendors provided visual effects for the film, ranging from the addition of blood and gore to the creation of the CGI character Colossus. Deadpool premiered at the Le Grand Rex in Paris on February 8, 2016, and was released in the United States on February 12, following an unconventional marketing campaign.

The film achieved both critical and commercial success, earning $782.6 million against a $58 million budget, becoming the ninth-highest-grossing film of 2016 and breaking numerous records, including the highest-grossing film in the X-Men series and the highest-grossing R-rated film at the time. Critics praised Reynolds' performance, the film's style, faithfulness to the comics, and action sequences, though some criticized the plot as formulaic. The film received many awards and nominations, including two Critics' Choice awards and two Golden Globe nominations. Two sequels have been released: Deadpool 2 (2018) and Deadpool & Wolverine (2024), with the latter being part of Phase Five of the Marvel Cinematic Universe.

== Plot ==
The vigilante Deadpool, Wade Wilson, ambushes Ajax and his convoy on an expressway. Throughout the ambush, Wade shows the viewer the events leading to how he became Deadpool. After being dishonorably discharged from the Canadian special forces, Wade works as a freelance mercenary until he meets a sex worker named Vanessa. They become romantically involved, and a year later, she accepts his marriage proposal. Wade is later diagnosed with terminal cancer and is approached by a mysterious recruiter who offers him an experimental treatment that will heal his cancer.

Wade leaves Vanessa so she will not have to watch him die. He is taken to a laboratory run by Ajax and Angel Dust, who injects him with a serum designed to awaken latent mutant genes in his body. They subject Wade to days of torture to trigger any mutation but to no avail. When Wade discovers Ajax's real name is Francis and mocks him for it, Ajax leaves Wade in a hypobaric chamber that periodically takes him to the verge of asphyxiation over a weekend. This activates a regenerative healing factor that counteracts Wade's cancer but leaves him severely disfigured with burn-like tumors all over his body. He escapes from the chamber and attacks Ajax but relents when told his condition can be cured. In the chaos, Ajax subdues Wade and leaves him for dead.

Wade survives due to his new healing factor and seeks out Vanessa but does not reveal that he is alive out of fear that she will shun him because of his new scarred appearance. After consulting with his best friend Weasel, Wade decides to hunt down Ajax for the cure. He becomes a vigilante, adopting the name "Deadpool" (from Weasel picking him in a dead pool), and moves into the home of an elderly blind woman named Al. Throughout the following year, he questions and kills many of Ajax's associates until one, the recruiter, reveals Ajax's whereabouts. This information allows Wade to enact the ambush. He kills all of Ajax's henchmen, subdues Ajax, and demands the cure, but the X-Men Colossus and his trainee Negasonic Teenage Warhead interrupt him. Colossus attempts to convince Wade to mend his ways and join the X-Men, but Wade turns him down. Taking advantage of this distraction, Ajax escapes and regroups with Angel Dust. They then head to Weasel's bar, where Ajax hears of Vanessa.

Ajax kidnaps Vanessa and takes her to a decommissioned Helicarrier in a scrapyard. In response, Wade convinces Colossus and Negasonic to help him get her back. They battle Angel Dust and a group of Ajax's men while Wade fights his way to Ajax. During the battle, Negasonic accidentally destroys the supports keeping the Helicarrier stable. Deadpool protects Vanessa as the ship collapses around them, while Colossus carries Negasonic and Angel Dust to safety. Ajax attacks Wade again but is overpowered. He reveals that there is no cure, and despite Colossus's pleas, Wade kills Ajax. Vanessa angrily berates Wade for leaving her but reconciles with him after she sees his disfigured face and learns the reason why he never came back to her.

In a post-credits scene, Wade imitates the post-credits scene of Ferris Bueller's Day Off, stating they only have enough money left to announce that Cable will show up in the sequel and making casting suggestions for the character. (Note: As would later be depicted in Deadpool 2 (2018).)

== Cast ==
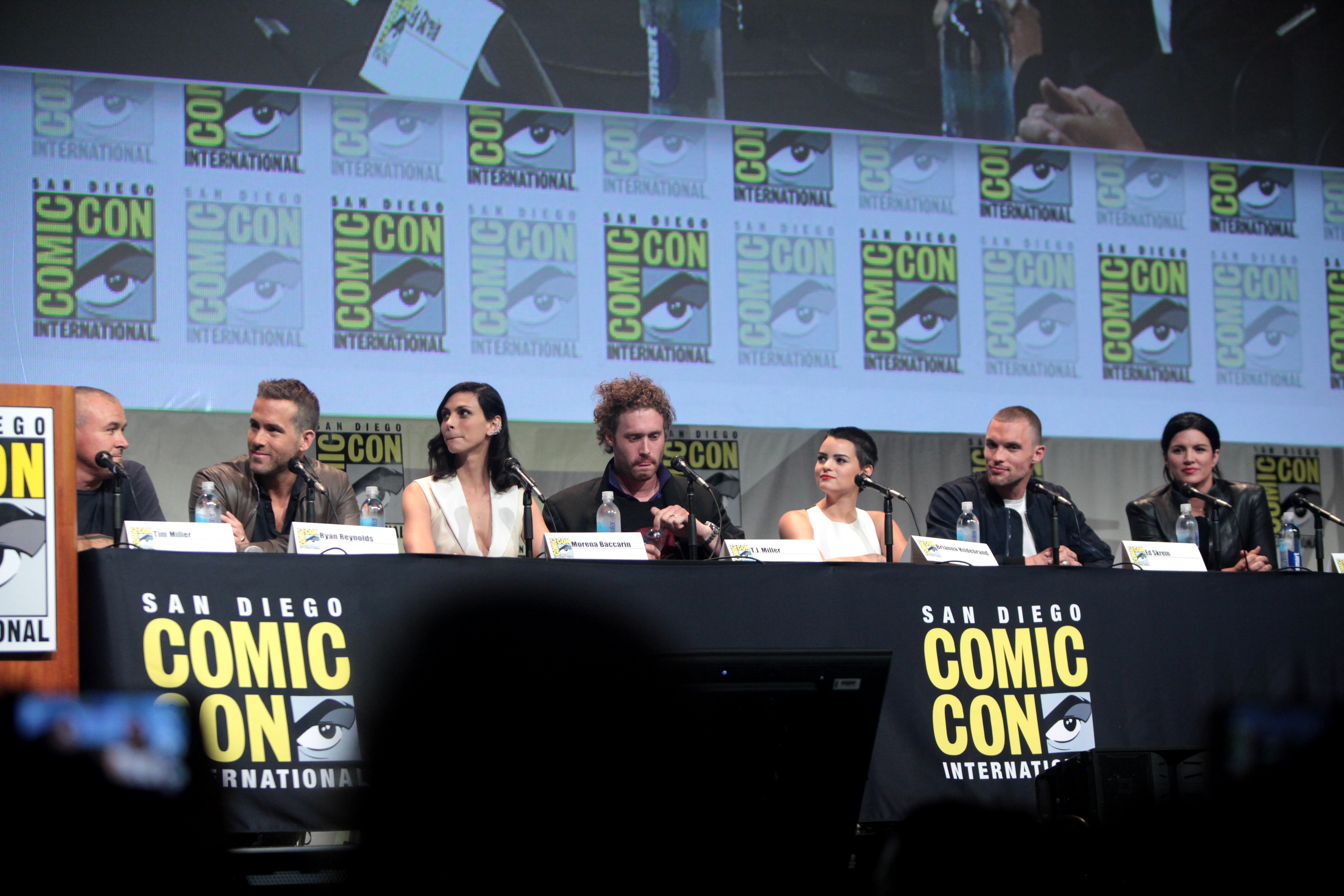
(L-R) Tim Miller, Reynolds, Baccarin, T. J. Miller, Hildebrand, Skrein, and Carano speaking at the 2015 San Diego Comic-Con

- Ryan Reynolds as Wade Wilson / Deadpool:
  A wisecracking mercenary with accelerated healing, but severe scarring over his body after undergoing an experimental cancer treatment. The writers described Deadpool as "fun to hang out with... in short doses". Reynolds promised a more "authentic" and comic-faithful version of the character than the one he portrayed in X-Men Origins: Wolverine (2009). Unlike the comic book character, the movie character is portrayed as an actor who embraces the fact that he's acting rather than a comic book character that acknowledges its true nature as a drawing.
- Morena Baccarin as Vanessa Carlysle:
  An escort and Wilson's fiancée. Baccarin described Vanessa as "scrappy" and not a damsel in distress. The character was initially designed as a "typical prostitute", but Baccarin worked with the costume and makeup teams to make her appearance more layered. The film does not explore the character's comic book alter ego Copycat, as the writers wanted to focus on Deadpool. Makeup designer Bill Corso, however, included some references to Copycat's blue appearance in the comics.
- Ed Skrein as Francis Freeman / Ajax:
  The artificially mutated leader of the program that creates Deadpool. He is immune to pain and has enhanced strength and reflexes. Director Tim Miller praised Skrein's dedication to the role, saying, "he worked really, really hard" for the fight sequences and completed around 80% of his own stunts in the film. Skrein was influenced by Rutger Hauer's Roy Batty from Blade Runner (1982), and serial killer Harold Shipman.
- T.J. Miller as Weasel:
  Wilson's best friend. Miller felt he was cast as the character because he "looks like his superhero power is spilling mustard on his shirt". Producer Simon Kinberg added that an actor was needed "who could keep up with" Reynolds comedically. Miller attempted to give the character a facial tic, but director Tim Miller rejected the idea.
- Gina Carano as Angel Dust:
  An artificially mutated member of the program that creates Deadpool. She uses her adrenaline as fuel to increase her strength and durability to superhuman levels. Director Miller personally called Carano and asked her to take the part. Carano felt the character's rage and "extreme adrenaline issues" made comparisons to the drug "angel dust" fitting. She had wanted to wear yellow contact lenses to match the character's look in the comics, but Corso turned the idea down, comparing it to something from the Twilight films.
- Brianna Hildebrand as Negasonic Teenage Warhead:
  A teenage X-Men trainee who can generate atomic bursts from her body. The filmmakers wanted to use the character based on her name and looked to change her comic abilities from telepathic and precognitive powers to "a literal warhead". They required permission from Marvel to do this, which Tim Miller obtained after talking with Marvel Studios president Kevin Feige. A deal was reached allowing the change in exchange for 20th Century Fox giving Marvel Studios the film rights to the character Ego the Living Planet for use by James Gunn in their film Guardians of the Galaxy Vol. 2 (2017).
- Leslie Uggams as Blind Al:
  An elderly blind woman and Deadpool's roommate. Uggams said that Al has "been through British Intelligence, she's done all kinds of wild and crazy things ... she's old, but she's feisty." Uggams added that Al has a "love/hate" relationship with Deadpool.
- Karan Soni as Dopinder: A taxi driver who befriends Deadpool.
- Jed Rees as The Recruiter:
  A recruiter for Ajax, who encourages Wade to join Ajax's program under the guise of a cure for Wade's cancer. The character is referred to by Deadpool as "Agent Smith" due to the similarity to the character from The Matrix franchise (1999–present).
- Stefan Kapičić as the voice of Colossus:
  An X-Men who can transform his entire body into organic steel. Writer Rhett Reese called him "a great foil to Deadpool because he's very self-serious and goody-two-shoes". Director Miller changed the character drastically from his previous film appearances, where he was portrayed by Daniel Cudmore. Miller felt the Cudmore version, which he described as "[t]hat dude with the shiny skin was not Colossus”. He wanted the character to be seven and a half feet tall. Andre Tricoteux was the body-double of Colossus on set, and Kapičić was cast to give the character an "authentic Russian accent" as he has in the comics.

Additionally, X-Men co-creator Stan Lee and Deadpool co-creator Rob Liefeld make cameo appearances as a strip club emcee and a patron of Weasel's bar, respectively. Rob Hayter makes a cameo appearance as Bob, Agent of Hydra, a recurring character in the comics alongside Deadpool. The rights for Bob are owned by Marvel Studios. They did not permit him to be used in the film, so his comic history and connections to the Hydra organization are not referenced in the film. He is explained, instead, as a former special-forces operative like Wilson. Hugh Jackman, who portrayed Logan / Wolverine in the X-Men film series, was very supportive of Deadpool and it making fun of himself and his character. He is seen in the film on a People magazine Sexiest Man Alive cover. A scene featuring Nathan Fillion as a bathroom attendant was cut, but was included in the deleted scenes of the home media release. Fillion would later voice Headpool in the 2024 sequel, Deadpool & Wolverine.

== Production ==
=== Development ===
Artisan Entertainment announced a deal with Marvel Entertainment in May 2000 to co-produce, finance, and distribute several films based on Marvel Comics' characters, including Deadpool. By February 2004, writer and director David S. Goyer and Ryan Reynolds were working on a Deadpool film at New Line Cinema. They had worked together on the Marvel film Blade: Trinity. Reynolds was interested in the part of Deadpool after learning that in the comics the character refers to his appearance as "Ryan Reynolds crossed with a Shar-Pei". New Line Cinema executive Jeff Katz, who thought Reynolds was the only actor suitable for the role, championed the idea. However, there were rights issues with 20th Century Fox and their X-Men films, and the project did not move forward.

By March 2005, Reynolds learned that Fox had expressed interest in a film featuring Deadpool. The character was set to make a cameo appearance in the 2009 film X-Men Origins: Wolverine, with Reynolds cast in the part. His role was expanded during the film's production. Katz was an executive at Fox at that point and said that Deadpool was "nicely set up to be explored in his own way" in a future film. The film's portrayal deviates from the original comic character, "imbuing him with several superpowers and sewing his mouth shut". Deadpool apparently dies in the film, though a post-credits scene showing him still alive was added to the film shortly before its release. After the successful opening weekend of Wolverine, Fox officially began development on Deadpool, with Reynolds attached to star and X-Men producer Lauren Shuler Donner involved. The spinoff was set to ignore the Wolverine version of Deadpool and return to the character's roots with a slapstick tone and a "propensity to break the fourth wall".

Rhett Reese and Paul Wernick were hired to write the script in January 2010. Reynolds, who worked closely with them, said they were chosen because, "Tonally, they got it. They just [understood Deadpool] right off the bat." By that June, Robert Rodriguez had been asked to direct the film. He confirmed this a month later, saying he had been sent a "really good" script and was considering taking on the project. By October he was no longer interested in it, and Adam Berg was being looked at to direct the film. In April 2011, Tim Miller was hired after working on the visual effects for some of the X-Men films, in part because of his work creating animated short films. These included the Academy Award-winning Gopher Broke and a DC Universe Online trailer, which was "epic and cinematic, everything [Fox wanted] their comic book movies to be". Miller would make his directorial debut with the film, while Reynolds closed a deal with Fox to produce the film.

Reynolds took on Green Lantern after Fox had no intention on making the project. The film was released later in 2011 and was a critical and commercial disappointment. This tainted the Deadpool project. Fox executives were already concerned about its R-rated content. After several meetings the studio agreed the film could not be reconfigured for a more traditional PG-13 rating, and gave Miller "a low-six-figure budget" to produce some test footage. He created the footage using CGI at his animation company Blur Studio in 2012, with Reynolds voicing Deadpool. The footage did not convince Fox to green-light the film. After the successful May release of Marvel Studios's The Avengers, Reese and Wernick thought Deadpool might be approved as an already developed superhero film. Fox was actually even more doubtful about the script, however, and began exploring ways to include Deadpool in an Avengers-esque team-up film. At different times during development, James Cameron and David Fincher, both friends of Miller, read the film's script and championed the project to Fox executives.

"Yes, I cheated a little [by leaking the test footage myself], but I think I was onto something that people would be interested in, [...] and I'm grateful that I listened to that instinct, and I'm grateful that I did the wrong thing in that moment."

— Star and producer Ryan Reynolds on leaking the test footage for Deadpool.

The test footage was leaked online in July 2014, and was met with an overwhelmingly enthusiastic response. That September, Fox gave Deadpool a release date of February 12, 2016. Production was set to begin in March 2015, with Simon Kinberg joining as producer. Reynolds attributed Fox's green-lighting of the film entirely to the leak. He, Miller, and the writers had previously discussed leaking the footage themselves, and Reynolds initially thought that Miller had done so. He later believed the leak came from someone at Fox. In exchange for being able to make the film the way they wanted, Fox gave the crew a much smaller budget than is typical for superhero films. In September 2025, during the Toronto International Film Festival, Reynolds admitted that he leaked the footage.

==== Writing ====
Reese and Wernick wrote a draft of the script every year for six years before completing the film, with around 70 percent of the first draft ending up in the final film. Reese described Reynolds as "the keeper of the Deadpool flame for many years ... if we ever do something that is off the Deadpool path, or if it doesn't feel like Deadpool, he catches it." The writers did not want the film to be an origin story, but Reynolds disagreed. They settled on a "modern" Deadpool story as well as the origin story connected by Deadpool's narration and fourth wall breaking. This helped to balance the darker origin story with the cartoon-like Deadpool scenes. It also allowed the opening fight sequence to be extended through the first half of the film (with the origin story told throughout), saving money on additional fight scenes. This fight sequence labeled the "Twelve Bullets Fight" reimagines the original test footage. Once the origin story is told, Deadpool uses a "fast-forward button" to return the audience to the present day.

In October 2014, Kinberg confirmed that Deadpool would be set in the same shared universe as the X-Men films, but would "stand independently". The writers wanted a traditional X-Man in the film as a foil to Deadpool and felt Colossus was a character who had not been explored much in previous films. Miller wanted "more superhero stuff", instead of "just Deadpool and a lot of guns". The character Negasonic Teenage Warhead was added as a trainee X-Men mentored by Colossus. She was chosen for her name from the list of comic characters available for use by Fox. The characters Garrison Kane, Wyre and Sluggo were included in the script at one point, but ultimately removed for budgetary reasons. These villains were replaced by a single character, Angel Dust. Cannonball, Emrys Killebrew, Patch and Tar Baby were also considered. The character Cable was also set to appear, but was eventually pushed to a potential sequel so this film could "get Deadpool on his feet" first.

The writers worked to keep the script's pop-culture references up-to-date throughout its development. Kinberg confirmed the film would make fun of Deadpool's portrayal in X-Men Origins: Wolverine. It also includes jokes at the expense of Green Lantern. While Miller felt it was okay for audience members not to understand all of the film's jokes, he wanted to avoid anything targeted specifically at comic fans. He was not in favor of any joke the audience "needs to look up on the internet" after the movie ends. The film's post-credits scene is a parody of the equivalent scene from Ferris Bueller's Day Off (1986), where the title character of that film breaks the fourth wall like Deadpool. In the parody scene, Deadpool wears a bath robe and tells the audience to go home. He also confirms that Cable will appear in the sequel. After reading the scene, a Fox executive described the film as a combination of Ferris Bueller's Day Off and Natural Born Killers (1994), a description the writers felt was accurate.

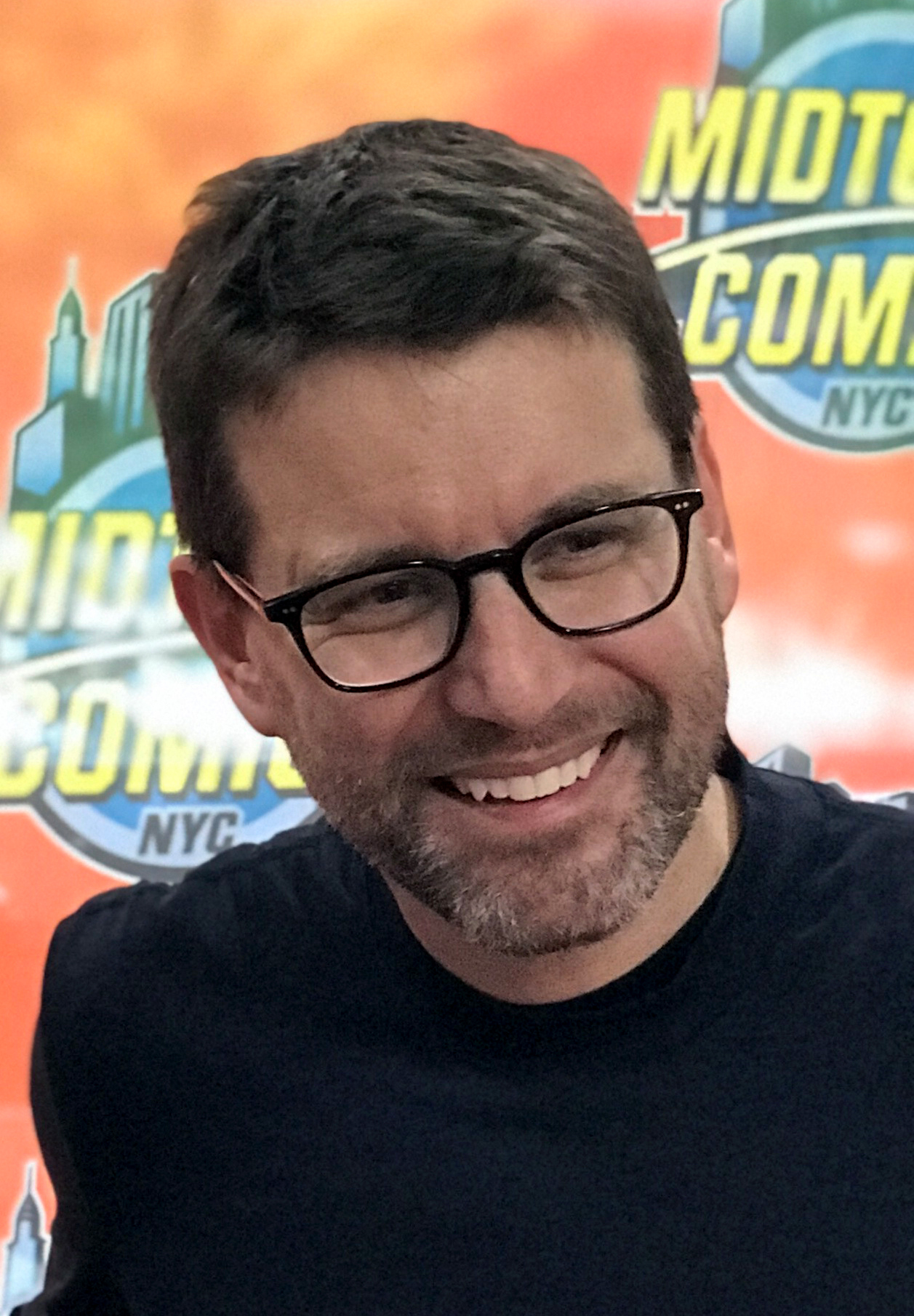
Co-writer Rhett Reese (pictured in 2018) said the studio's cuts to the film's budget made the script more efficient

Forty-eight hours before the film received the official green light from Fox, the studio cut its budget by $7–$8 million down to $58 million. This forced a last minute re-write that saw about nine pages cut from the 110-page script. Changes included the removal of a motorcycle chase at the end of the Twelve Bullets Fight and having Deadpool forget his bag of guns before the final battle sequence to avoid having to shoot a costly gun fight in the third act. Reese said, "It was that last, lean and mean chop that got us to a place where Fox was willing to make it. The script was very efficient and not too long. That was a function of budget more than anything, but I think it really made the movie pace nicely."

=== Pre-production ===
In January 2015, T.J. Miller and Ed Skrein were in talks to appear in the film, with Miller as "an additional comic voice" and Skrein as a villain. A month later, Fox was testing actresses to portray the female lead, including Morena Baccarin, Taylor Schilling, Crystal Reed, Rebecca Rittenhouse, Sarah Greene, and Jessica De Gouw. Gina Carano was cast as Angel Dust, and Miller was confirmed for an unspecified role. Baccarin was cast as Deadpool's love interest before the end of February. Colossus actor Daniel Cudmore said he would not be reprising the role for Deadpool, and declined an offer to provide reference for a CG version of the character to be voiced by another actor.

An immediate focus during pre-production was Deadpool's suit. Russ Shinkle and Film Illusions were hired to create the costume. Shinkle noted that "comic book art is fairly over the top in terms of physique", and he tried to balance that with reality. Reynolds did not wear a muscle suit under the costume, which Tim Miller felt gave it a slimmer, "quintessential Deadpool" look. Miller and Reynolds wept when they saw the completed costume. Reynolds explained, "we fought like hell... to make this the most faithful comic book to movie adaptation fans have ever seen. That's hard to accomplish and a feat, but we're just so happy with how this came out." The costume was designed with the film's stunts in mind. The mask's eye areas were removable so versions of the eyes better suited for the stunts could be used without having to change the whole mask. The suit was difficult for the visual effects team to replicate with CGI. Visual effects supervisor Jonathan Rothbart blamed this on the suit's fabric. He described it as mesh that allowed dirt to "get into the gutters and the cracks... [so when] the light hits it, it still takes that orangey hue but as soon as it goes in the shadow it dropped to this more blueish of the dirt." Film Illusions made six hero versions of the costume and twelve stunt-specific versions, along with three hero versions of Negasonic Teenage Warhead's costume.

Miller wanted Deadpool's scarred appearance to make him appear "fucking horrible" to justify his anger. Makeup designer Bill Corso had some leeway because in the comics "he's everything from a rotten corpse to a guy with a couple of lines on his face". Corso acknowledged the script's description of the character as "disfigured" but also wanted him to be "kind of charming and iconic". He wanted to avoid comparisons with Freddy Krueger and looked to Sin City (2005) for inspiration. The final makeup required nine silicone prosthetics to cover Reynolds' head, which took several hours to apply. For the scene where the character is naked, it took six hours to apply Reynolds' full-body makeup. Corso described the makeup for the rest of the film's characters as "pretty simple. Tim wanted to keep it really grounded."

=== Filming ===
Principal photography began on March 23, 2015, in Vancouver, British Columbia, under the working title Wham!. Filming took place at North Shore Studios and on location around the city. The production hired more than 2,000 locals as actors, extras and crew members. T. J. Miller and Baccarin were revealed to be playing Weasel and Vanessa, respectively. Skrein confirmed he was in the film, playing Ajax. Newcomer Brianna Hildebrand was cast as Negasonic Teenage Warhead.

Tim Miller and cinematographer Ken Seng wanted the film to look "grittier and less clean and glossy" than other superhero films. They decided to shoot with digital cameras but add film grain in post-production to give the images texture. Seng used Super Baltar lenses and Cooke zooms for the origin story timeline, and Panavision Primo lenses for the Deadpool scenes which gave them more clarity. The film's exterior scenes have a consistent overcast look, but location shooting came with "unpredictable" weather. For instance, the production had use of the Georgia Viaduct for two weeks and shot rain or shine before their permit expired. Seng used more lighting on cloudy days and less on sunny days to keep a consistent look. Production designer Sean Haworth, who had specific ideas for the sets, also worked closely with Miller. The production had to be very specific about which elements of each set were constructed to conserve the budget for visual effects. For the final scrapyard scene, garbage was built to a certain height to be extended with CGI. A gimbal was used for a tilting section of the yard that had to interact with many digital elements. The final sequence was filmed in a naval yard dressed with scrap metal. Rubber casts of the metal were made for stunts.

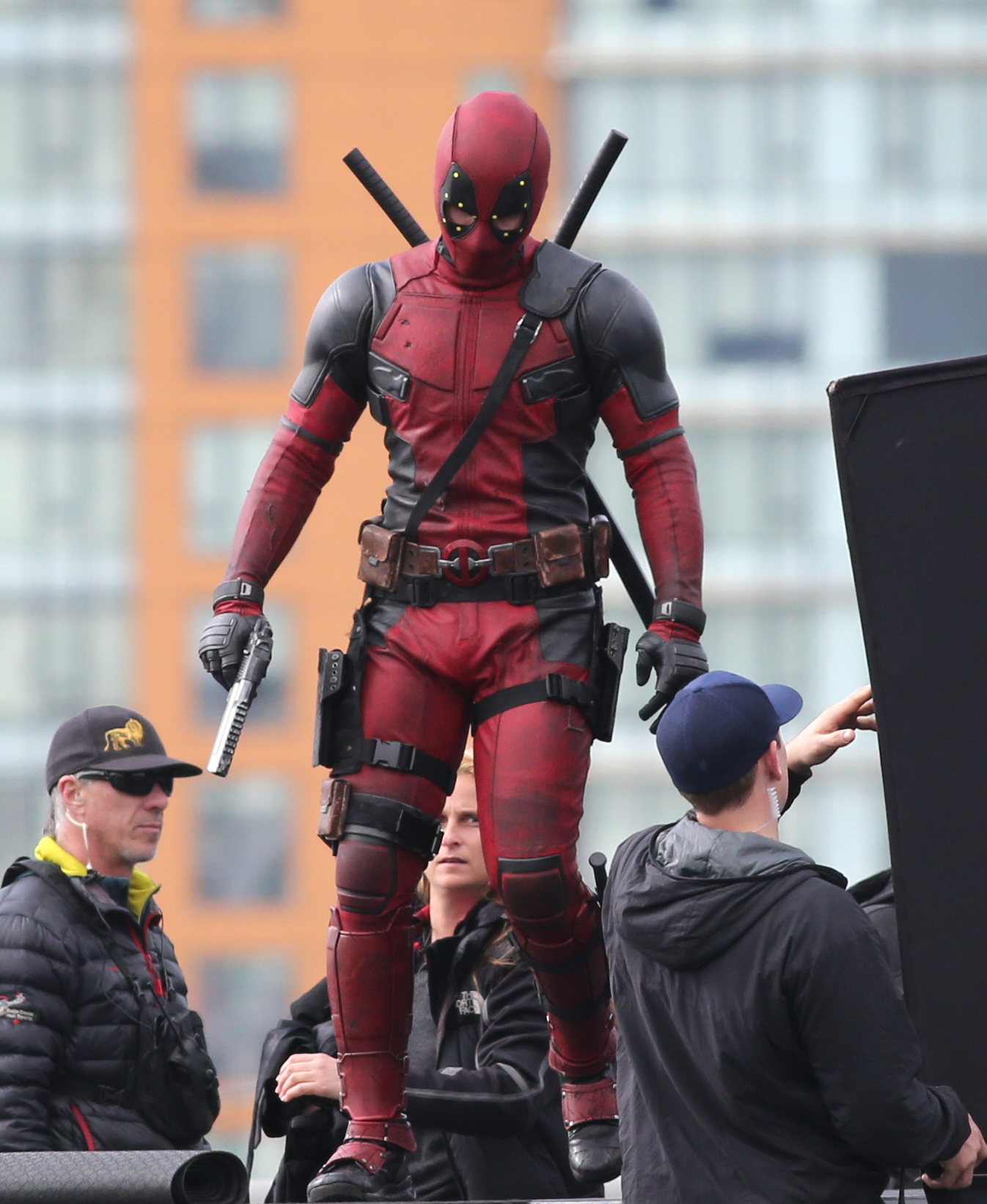
Stunt coordinator Philip J. Silvera in costume as Deadpool on set in Vancouver

When Fox was unwilling to pay Reese and Wernick to be on set every day, Reynolds paid their salaries. The writers had scripted the action very specifically, "every kill and almost down to every punch, kick, or shot", but Tim Miller and the stunt coordinators were free to change this. Robert Alonzo and Philip J. Silvera were the film's stunt coordinators; Silvera had provided motion capture reference for the test footage. The stunt team had a month before filming began to prepare the actors. Skrein worked "nonstop" to prepare. Silvera said Reynolds "has a photographic memory; he'd do something three or four times and remember it very well." A lot of the film's jokes were improvised on set, particularly by Reynolds. He said the actors often came up with around 15 alternate jokes for each one in the script, and were generally only limited to those because of time constraints. For example, Reese said Wernick had written some jokes for the scene where Deadpool visits Colossus and Negasonic. Instead Reynolds improvised the line on set, "It's funny that I only ever see two of you. It's almost like the studio couldn't afford another X-Men." This was based in truth and became then Fox chairman Jim Gianopulos's favorite line. Filming ended on May 29.

=== Post-production ===
Leslie Uggams said that she was in the film in July 2015 playing the role of Blind Al. Tim Miller stated that Jed Rees portrays "The Recruiter", and "did a good job of being creepy and syrupy sweet". Miller explained that Colossus would be a solely CGI creation in the film, with Andre Tricoteux cast to provide motion reference on set for the role along with the voice. In December, the voice of Colossus was recast, with Stefan Kapičić taking over the role. He completed his work eight weeks before the film was scheduled for release.

As soon as editor Julian Clarke began selecting shots for the film, they were color graded by EFILM's Tim Stipan to ensure they all matched. Stipan colored the characters slightly differently. He gave Deadpool a "dark, modern touch" and Colossus a "particular vibrancy and substance". Clarke edited each scene focusing on humor, choosing between alternate takes of jokes. He removed jokes made after Vanessa is kidnapped because they felt inappropriately timed. He cut down other scenes with fewer jokes, such as Wilson being tortured, as they were "too much". It would take the audience "too long to recover [and] get back in the irreverent spirit of the movie." During editing, a linear version of the film was produced. Clarke decided to go with interweaving the timelines to balance the different serious and silly tones.

One sequence removed from the film saw Wilson and Vanessa travel to Mexico looking for a cure after he turned down The Recruiter. It was removed for pacing reasons and replaced with a short scene of Wilson sitting beside his window that was originally filmed to show him thinking about his diagnosis. In its new context the scene implies him re-thinking The Recruiter's offer.

Because of the animation required for Deadpool's mask and Colossus, Reese and Wernick had more freedom than usual to keep adjusting the script during post-production. Reynolds recorded new dialogue using his iPhone, and then re-recorded the lines in an additional dialogue recording session once the film was finalized. Lines added after filming included Reynolds doing an impression of Wolverine star Hugh Jackman's natural Australian accent, and another where Deadpool asks whether the character Professor X is being portrayed by James McAvoy or Patrick Stewart at that point in the X-Men timeline. This became a favorite line in the film for many audience members.

==== Visual effects ====
Digital Domain (DD), Atomic Fiction, Blur Studio, Weta Digital, Rodeo FX, and Luma Pictures produced Deadpool's visual effects. Reynolds credited Miller and his visual effects experience with producing a film that looked like others made with bigger budgets. Motion capture supervisor Greg LaSalle agreed, noting that Miller held off working on the CGI for Colossus until after the film was edited to avoid spending money on shots that would not be used. Miller worked with visual effects supervisor Jonathan Rothbart to design and complete the film's 1500 effects shots—700 more than originally planned. 800 of them were completed in the last four weeks of production.

Top: Andre Tricoteux (center) on set as Colossus, wearing a gray tracking suit. Bottom: completed shot, with CGI Colossus by Digital Domain and environment by Atomic Fiction

Colossus's movements were re-recorded with performer T. J. Storm, as Tricoteux had been unable to move athletically because of the platform shoes he wore on set to replicate the character's height. LaSalle was used for his facial performance. DD mapped these performances onto a digital model that was designed to be comic-accurate. The team sought specific reference for Colossus's metallic finish to avoid looking "chromey", by visiting a metal company to look at samples. They settled on cold rolled steel, with the darker hot rolled steel used for his hair. The model also includes ridges which could be moved separately to keep them perfectly straight as in the comic books. DD also created the model of Deadpool that was used by all the VFX vendors. His mask was animated around the eyes to be expressive as in the comics. This helped balance out the "chinwag" coming through the bottom of the mask as Reynolds acted. Fully replacing Deadpool's head was going to be too costly, so Weta Digital warped each shot based on facial references from Reynolds and adjusted the lighting to reflect the changes instead. This was called an "ingenious 2D-ish solution".

Atomic Fiction created a freeway environment for the Twelve Bullets Fight, with a backdrop based on Detroit, Chicago, and Vancouver. They also created the vehicles used in the sequence. These assets were used by Blur for the opening titles, which move through a frozen moment where Deadpool is fighting thugs inside a crashing car. The amusing titles include "Directed by an overpaid tool" and "Produced by asshats". Reynolds, Miller, and the writers came up with their own credits hoping to set the tone for the film.

Luma contributed the film's blood and gore using practical footage as well as digital effects for more complex scenes. When Deadpool cuts off his own hand, DD did not want to be "outdone" by Luma and had "buckets of blood pouring out". Luma created the regrowing hand, inspired by the hand of a fetus. When Deadpool breaks both his hands, DD went through 20 or 30 different versions of what broken fingers could look like. For Deadpool's initial scarring from the warehouse fire, Rodeo FX referenced rotting fruit and maggot-eaten meat. The company added a CGI penis to Reynolds in this sequence, which visual effects supervisor Wayne Brinton said, "you don't even notice [but] when it wasn't there it looked really weird". Rodeo also augmented the practical fire in the scene.

The vendors all collaborated for the final battle sequence, which takes place in the wreckage of a helicarrier. Luma created the climactic fight between Deadpool and Ajax; DD created most of the Colossus effects until he is damaged when Blur Studio took over; DD created the effects for Negasonic Teenage Warhead's abilities as well as expanding the helicarrier's deck; Rodeo contributed matte paintings for the background; and Weta provided the facial animation for Deadpool. Negasonic's abilities were the only "supernatural effect-sy thing" in the film, and were based on fuel-air explosives and solar flares to try to ground them in reality. Setting the final sequence on the wrecked helicarrier was Miller's idea. This helped to expand the scope of the third act and include more connections to the comics and the wider Marvel Universe. To avoid rights issues with Marvel Studios, the helicarrier for Deadpool was designed to be "as different as possible from the one in The Avengers". Additionally a French animation artist with a "unique style" created 2D cartoon characters that dance around Deadpool after he is stabbed in the head during the fight.

== Music ==
Tom Holkenborg announced in October 2015 that he would compose the score for Deadpool. Noting that Deadpool only makes pre-1990 musical references, Holkenborg decided to use sounds from the 1980s in the movie's main theme, such as those of an Oberheim and a Synclavier. Several songs were written in to Reese and Wernick's script to be used in the film. Some of these ultimately did not work as intended. For example, the sex montage with Wilson and Vanessa was to play along with Frank Sinatra's version of "It Was a Very Good Year" in the script, but it was changed to Neil Sedaka's "Calendar Girl" during editing. A soundtrack album featuring Holkenborg's score and the songs heard in the film was released digitally on February 12, 2016, and physically on March 4 through Milan Records. The Deadpool rap was also featured, during the "Finding Francis" montage. Both the music of George Michael and his pop group Wham! are used throughout, with repeat reference to the Wham! album Make It Big.

== Marketing ==
Due to the film's limited marketing budget, Reynolds worked closely with Fox's marketing chief Marc Weinstock to use the Internet to their advantage and come up with cheaper, "Deadpool-based" ways to market the film. This included unique trailers, unconventional billboards, promotional tie-ins with Super Bowl 50 and Viacom, and an extensive social media presence. Reynolds kept one of the Deadpool costumes for himself, and appeared in it throughout the marketing campaign. Visual effects vendor Image Engine animated Deadpool's mask for these appearances, using a process similar to that used by Weta Digital for the film. Emma Grey Ellis at Wired.com described the campaign as "crazy and unrelenting" with Deadpool waging a "marketing siege of every platform you would think of". Bobby Anhalt at Screen Rant called it possibly "the best film marketing campaign in the history of cinema". HostGator's Jeremy Jensen attributed the campaign's success to Reynolds, and to Fox for embracing the film's R rating.

== Release ==
=== Theatrical ===
Deadpool's world premiere was held at the Grand Rex in Paris on February 8, 2016, before its initial theatrical release in Hong Kong the next day. This was followed by releases in 49 other markets over the next few days, including the United States on February 12. The film was released in several formats, including IMAX, 4DX, DLP, premium large formats, and D-Box.

Kinberg explained that unlike the previous X-Men films, Deadpool is "a hard R. It's graphic. Nothing is taboo. You either commit to a truly outrageous boundary-pushing kind of movie or you don't." China forbade the film's release because of this. Though R-rated American films are often "cleaned up" for release there, it was decided that doing so was impossible without affecting the plot. It was not released in Uzbekistan after theater owners in the country decided against showing the film because of its age restriction and how it violated the country's societal norms. Deadpool received seven "general cuts" to obtain approval for release in India. Deadpool was initially banned in China due to its violence and nudity for its initial release. The film eventually premiered in the country during the 2018 Beijing International Film Festival, which ran over a week from April 15–22. The original version of the film played at the festival without any edits being made specifically for Chinese censors.

=== Home media ===
Deadpool was released for digital download on April 26, 2016, moved up from the physical home media release, which came on May 10. The latter release, for Blu-ray and DVD, included behind-the-scenes featurettes, deleted scenes, a blooper reel, and two audio commentaries: one by Tim Miller and Deadpool co-creator Rob Liefeld, and another by Reynolds, Reese, and Wernick. On November 7, Fox rereleased the film and its special features on Blu-ray for the holiday season, as Deadpool's Holiday Blu-ray package. The film was re-released again in April 2018 in a Deadpool Two Year Anniversary Edition Blu-ray package, with collectible covers as well as "stickers, car decals, temporary tattoos and a set of paper dolls". A 4K UHD Steelbook version was also released exclusively through Best Buy featuring original artwork. Deadpool was made available on Disney+ in most regions excluding the United States on February 23, 2021, as part of the streamer's launch of the new Star hub which focused on adding more mature content. As of July 2022, the film was also made available to stream on Disney+ in the United States, alongside Logan (2017) and Deadpool 2, marking the first R-rated films available on the streaming service in the U.S. region.

== Reception ==
=== Box office ===
Deadpool grossed $363 million in the United States and Canada and $419.8 million in other countries for a worldwide total of $782.8 million, against a budget of $56.7 million. It broke many records with its opening weekend gross across the world, and went on to become the highest-grossing X-Men film, as well as the ninth-highest-grossing film of 2016. Deadline Hollywood calculated the net profit of the film to be $317 million, when factoring together all expenses and revenues for the film, making it the second-most profitable release of 2016. When discussing potential reasons for the film's surprise success, the site highlighted its marketing campaign. It also became the highest-grossing R-rated film of all time, dethroning The Matrix Reloaded (2003) until being beaten by Joker in 2019.

At the end of January 2016, the film was projected to earn $54.7–60 million over its opening weekend in the United States and Canada. Fox's rivals projected the film to earn closer to $80 million. It ultimately opened at No. 1, making $142.4 million for the weekend, and $172.7 million over the long Presidents' Day weekend. Trying to explain this surprise, Fox's domestic distribution chief, Chris Aronson, said, "It's hard to comp and predict. You're doing something that's never been done. It's like you throw the rulebook out the window." The weekend included $12.7 million from Thursday preview showings on February 11, $47.5 million on its opening day, $42.5 million on February 13, and $42.6 million on February 14, as well as $19.7 million on February 15 to end the long weekend. These were all day-of-the-week records for R-rated films and days in February for Thursday through Monday. $16.7 million of this came from IMAX screens, a record opening weekend for R-rated films and February releases in that format. Deadpool also broke Star Wars: Episode III – Revenge of the Sith's (2005) record for having the biggest opening weekend for any 20th Century Fox film. The film earned an additional $55 million in its second weekend. This kept it at No. 1, and made it the fastest R-rated film to cross $200 million, doing so in nine days. It became the highest-grossing X-Men film and R-rated comic book superhero film the next day. It remained in the No. 1 position for its third week, but fell behind Zootopia and London Has Fallen the following week. Deadpool's domestic run ended on June 17, after 126 days, with $373.1 million. This was shortly after it became the highest-grossing R-rated film worldwide. The film's U.S. audience, across its whole run, was 59% white, 21% Hispanic, 12% African-American, and 8% Asian. It was also 62% male, and had an average age of 35.

The film was released in 80 markets around the world, many of them in its first week. This included the United Kingdom, France, and Australia on its first day, February 9, where it was the No. 1 film and broke several records. The film also opened well in Asian countries, notably Taiwan—where Reynolds had traveled for promotion and made the "central hub" of South East Asia for the film—and Hong Kong, where the film had the biggest Chinese New Year single day ever. It went on to gross $132.2 million for its international opening weekend, which included $9 million from IMAX showings breaking opening weekend records for February releases and R-rated films in that format in several markets. It was the No. 1 film in all markets where it was released over the weekend, except Poland and Malaysia where it was No. 2 behind local films Planet Single and The Mermaid, respectively. The film broke the record for biggest opening weekend in Russia and Thailand, and set records for biggest R-rated film and February opening weekends in several other markets. It remained No. 1 for the international box office in its second weekend, making an additional $84.7 million from 77 markets. The film made No. 1 debuts in 17 new countries, including Korea, Spain, and Italy, and maintained its No. 1 position in countries like the UK, Germany, and Brazil. Its South East Asia performance was compared favorably to bigger superhero films like Guardians of the Galaxy and Captain America: The Winter Soldier (both 2014). Deadpool was No. 1 for a third consecutive weekend, before falling to No. 3 behind Ip Man 3 and Zootopia in its fourth. Deadpool opened in its final market, Japan, in June, and was the No. 1 film there, with a $6.5 million opening weekend.

=== Critical response ===
Deadpool received critical acclaim upon its release. On review aggregator Rotten Tomatoes, the film holds an approval rating of 85% based on 345 reviews, with an average rating of 7.1/10. The site's critical consensus reads, "Fast, funny, and gleefully profane, the fourth-wall-busting Deadpool subverts superhero film formula with wildly entertaining—and decidedly non-family-friendly—results." On Metacritic, the film has a weighted average score of 65 out of 100, based on 49 critics, indicating "generally favorable" reviews. Audiences polled by CinemaScore gave the film an average grade of "A" on an A+ to F scale. PostTrak reported an average positive score of 97%, with 45% of filmgoers saying the film exceeded their expectations.

Michael O'Sullivan of The Washington Post scored Deadpool three-and-a-half out of four, calling it a "voraciously self-aware comedy" and the first R-rated Marvel film "with real teeth". He praised the film's attitude and tone, Reynolds for making Deadpool a likeable character and the film's action scenes. TheWrap's Alonso Duralde said Deadpool "shouldn't work, but it absolutely does", feeling that it successfully balanced comedy with superhero action, and that the chemistry between Reynolds and Baccarin gave enough weight to the plot to support the tone and violence. Calvin Wilson at the St. Louis Post-Dispatch also gave the film three-and-a-half out of four, saying it was "smart, sexy, and outrageous", but that it would not work without Reynolds. The Guardian's Peter Bradshaw gave the film four out of five calling it "neurotic and needy—and very entertaining", comparing it to Kick-Ass (2010) and Kill Bill (2003). He did feel the film's villains were underused. Writing for Uproxx, Drew McWeeny described it as "the world's most violent and vulgar Bugs Bunny cartoon", and praised the film's unconventional plot structure, its personal stakes, the difference in tone and storytelling from other superhero films, and the cast. Variety's Justin Chang said the film is "terribly arch and juvenile [but] also startlingly effective", praising Reynolds' performance (and the film's willingness to hide his looks under prosthetics), the script, and director Miller for staying "out of the way of his script and his star". Todd McCarthy at The Hollywood Reporter felt the film took a while to get going, "but once it does, Deadpool drops trou to reveal itself as a really raunchy, very dirty and pretty funny goof on the entire superhero ethos".

Rolling Stone's Peter Travers said the film "goes on too long and repetition dulls its initial cleverness", but the "junky feel is part of its charm". He praised the cast, particularly Reynolds as well as Tim Miller's action sequences. At The Boston Globe, Tom Russo gave the film three stars. He criticized the "featherweight" plot, but said that there is enough humor to support it, and that Reynolds was "born to play" Deadpool. Chris Nashawaty graded the film a 'B' for Entertainment Weekly, saying it "doesn't have the most adrenalized action sequences or the deepest origin story" but makes up for that with R-rated fun. Nashawaty felt Reynolds was the perfect star for the film and is "a blast of laughing gas in a genre that tends to take itself way too seriously". Tasha Robinson at The Verge felt there was too much juvenile humor. She noted the film did not make homophobic, racist, or sexist jokes, and that its overall tone remained joyous despite the material. David Edelstein of Vulture said the film's jokes save it from a lack of subtext and strong villains and noted the "gratifyingly twisty" structure. Manohla Dargis at The New York Times was not impressed with the listing of the film's genre cliches in the opening credits before they were used. She highlighted the "human" elements in the film and the moments where Reynolds and Tim Miller did "more than hit the same bombastic notes over and over again". IndieWire's Kate Erbland gave the film a 'B−', praising its style, and Reynolds' Deadpool for breaking the superhero mold, but criticizing the overall film for following genre conventions and focusing on "numbing" violence and un-original swearing and nudity.

Writing for the Los Angeles Times, Kenneth Turan said that Deadpool "gets off to a fun start" but the character "eventually wears out his welcome". He noted that though the film has a complicated narrative, it is masking a conventional Marvel origin story. Turan did highlight the film's romantic element and Baccarin's performance. Jonathon Pile of Empire gave the film three out of five, saying the number of jokes "will soon numb you to their impact". He called the film a fun alternative to other superhero films. Robbie Collin at The Daily Telegraph also gave the film three out of five, saying it is not "the future of superhero movies", calling it "an enjoyably obnoxious detour". He felt some of the film's jokes about superhero cliches were out of date by the time the film was released. The San Francisco Chronicle's Mick LaSalle did not appreciate the humor, fourth wall breaking, or violence. He concluded the film is "bad, borderline garbage, but disturbing, too, in that it's just the kind of fake-clever awfulness that might be cinema's future".

=== Accolades ===
Deadpool has received many awards and nominations, recognizing the film as a whole, as well as: the cast's performance, particularly Reynolds as Deadpool; several technical areas, including the film's makeup, sound, and visual effects; and the film's unconventional marketing campaign. It was nominated for two Golden Globe Awards, four Critics' Choice Movie Awards (winning two), a Directors Guild of America Award, five Empire Awards, seven Golden Trailer Awards (winning two), a Hugo Award, two Key Art Awards for marketing (winning both), eight MTV Movie Awards (winning two), a Producers Guild of America Award, four People's Choice Awards (winning two), three Saturn Awards (winning one), six Teen Choice Awards (winning two), and a Writers Guild of America Award.

After being nominated for awards such as the Golden Globes, Critics' Choice, and Writers Guild of America, Deadpool was considered a serious contender by commentators for several Academy Awards, despite its content and tone. This included potential nominations for Best Adapted Screenplay and Best Makeup and Hairstyling, and after its Producers Guild of America nomination, Best Picture. When the film did not receive any Academy Award nominations, it was widely considered to have been "snubbed". Analyzing potential reasons for this, Screen Rant's Alex Leadbeater said that while the film "earned a solid thumbs up from most", it was generally not praised by top critics for offering any "depth or related subversion of its genre". He also noted an apparent bias that Academy voters have against superhero films; the lack of a targeted campaign for the awards by Fox, who did not seem to be expecting any of the film's previous awards either; and the number of other films in contention, as "2016 was, all in all, a pretty good year for movies". A variant cover for Marvel Comics' X-Men Gold #1, with art by Ron Lim and released in April 2017, references Deadpool's Oscar snub.

=== Cinematic impact ===
Before Deadpool's success, R-rated, comic-based films considered successful were 300 (2006) and Watchmen (2009), which earned about half the opening weekend gross of successful PG-13 superhero films. Kick-Ass, a film tonally similar to Deadpool, made even less with a $19.8 million opening. Many reasons were given why Deadpool went on to be more successful than these, including the popularity of the Marvel brand and Reynolds' performance. Tom Huddleston Jr. wrote for Fortune that Deadpool was proof to Hollywood that R-rated films can be as successful as PG-13 films, "particularly when fans see the rating itself as validation that the film is true to its source material".

A Hollywood executive not involved with the film felt it succeeded because it "has a self-deprecating tone that's riotous. It's never been done before. It's poking fun at Marvel. That label takes itself so seriously; can you imagine them making fun of themselves in a movie?" James Gunn, director of Marvel's Guardians of the Galaxy, rejected this saying Deadpool was a success because "it's original, it's damn good... and it wasn't afraid to take risks". Gunn hoped studios would learn "the right lesson" from the film and not just try to make more films like Deadpool. After Fox's Logan (2017) also became a success, Forbes' Paul Tassi reiterated Gunn's sentiments, saying the rating was "appropriate given the 'adult' nature of these two heroes", but "too much stock is being put into unrestrained violence rather than people examining what actually makes these movies work". Graeme McMillan of The Hollywood Reporter concurred, adding, "Why not take the freedom that comes from that rating and try to re-approach the mainstream genre with that attitude?"

In March 2017, a Warner Bros. executive said that an R-rated DC Extended Universe film could "absolutely" happen, while Sony Pictures began developing an R-rated adaptation of the character Venom with a smaller budget, inspired by Fox's success with Deadpool and Logan (even though Venom was released under the PG-13 rating). In June, Kevin Feige said in response to the successes that, though Marvel Studios was not planning any R-rated films for its Marvel Cinematic Universe, "it's not out of the question". After the proposed acquisition of 21st Century Fox by Disney was announced in December 2017, Disney CEO Bob Iger said that the company would be willing to make future R-rated Marvel films like Deadpool, potentially under a "Marvel-R" brand, "as long as we let the audiences know what's coming".

== Franchise ==
A sequel, Deadpool 2, was released in May 2018 to comparable critical and commercial success. Following the acquisition of 21st Century Fox by Disney, the character's film rights were returned to Marvel Studios alongside the X-Men and the Fantastic Four. Deadpool & Wolverine, a third film starring Reynolds and Hugh Jackman and integrating their characters into the Marvel Cinematic Universe (MCU), was released on July 26, 2024, as part of Phase Five of the MCU.

=== Sequel ===
Before Deadpool's release, Fox green-lit a sequel with Reese and Wernick returning to write the screenplay. The involvement of Reynolds and Tim Miller was confirmed at the 2016 CinemaCon in April, but Miller left the film at the end of October over "mutual creative differences" with Reynolds. The next month, David Leitch signed on to direct the sequel. Leitch first made a short film, No Good Deed, which was written by Reese and Wernick. Deadpool 2 was released on May 18, 2018, with Baccarin, T. J. Miller, Uggams, Hildebrand, and Kapičić all returning. Josh Brolin and Zazie Beetz joined them as Cable and Domino respectively, who are members of X-Force alongside Deadpool.

=== Marvel Cinematic Universe ===
In March 2017, Reese said that a future film focused on X-Force would be separate from Deadpool 3, "so I think we'll be able to take two paths. X-Force is where we're launching something bigger, but then Deadpool 3 is where we're contracting and staying personal and small." After the acquisition of Fox by Disney was announced in December 2017 and completed in March 2019, Disney's CEO Bob Iger stated that Deadpool and other Marvel properties at Fox would be integrated with the MCU under Marvel Studios. In December 2019, Reynolds confirmed that a third Deadpool film was in development at Marvel Studios; this was reiterated in January 2021 by Kevin Feige, who also confirmed that the film would be set in the MCU.

In March 2022, Shawn Levy (who previously collaborated with Reynolds on Free Guy and The Adam Project) joined as director, with Reese and Wernick returning to write the screenplay. The film was released on July 26, 2024, with Hugh Jackman reprising his role as Wolverine.
