= Marketing for Deadpool (film) =

Marketing campaign for the 2016 superhero film Deadpool

Deadpool is a 2016 American superhero film based on the Marvel Comics character of the same name, distributed by 20th Century Fox. It is the eighth installment of the X-Men film series. The film was directed by Tim Miller from a screenplay by Rhett Reese and Paul Wernick, and stars Ryan Reynolds in the title role alongside Morena Baccarin, Ed Skrein, T. J. Miller, Gina Carano, Leslie Uggams, Brianna Hildebrand, and Stefan Kapičić. In Deadpool, Wade Wilson hunts the man who gave him mutant abilities, but also a scarred physical appearance, as the wisecracking, fourth wall-breaking antihero Deadpool.

After spending 10 years in development hell, Deadpool received a greenlight from Fox with a much smaller budget than is usually given to a big superhero film, $58 million. This included giving the production team, including Miller in his directorial debut, the leeway they needed to create a comic-accurate film, after the less-faithful portrayal of the character in X-Men Origins: Wolverine was not well received. Focus was placed on reproducing the tone, humor, and violence of the comics. Deadpool was released in the United States on February 12, 2016, and became a critical and financial success, breaking numerous box office records around the world.

An extensive marketing campaign was carried out before the film's release, with Reynolds working closely with the Fox marketing team to take advantage of the internet and social media due to the film's much lower budget than other superhero films. Focus was put on the lead character and his signature humor and violence rather than solely the film, with Reynolds appearing in character as Deadpool for several different promotions.

== Approach ==
The marketing budget for Deadpool was smaller than usual, like the production budget, so Reynolds worked closely with Fox domestic marketing chief Marc Weinstock to use the internet to their advantage and come up with cheaper, "Deadpool-based" ways to market the film. Weinstock noted that it was unusual for an actor in a film to do this. Reynolds kept one of the Deadpool costumes for himself, and appeared in it throughout the marketing campaign. Visual effects vendor Image Engine animated Deadpool's mask for these appearances, using a similar process to that used by Weta Digital for the film.

== Promotion ==
=== Trailers ===
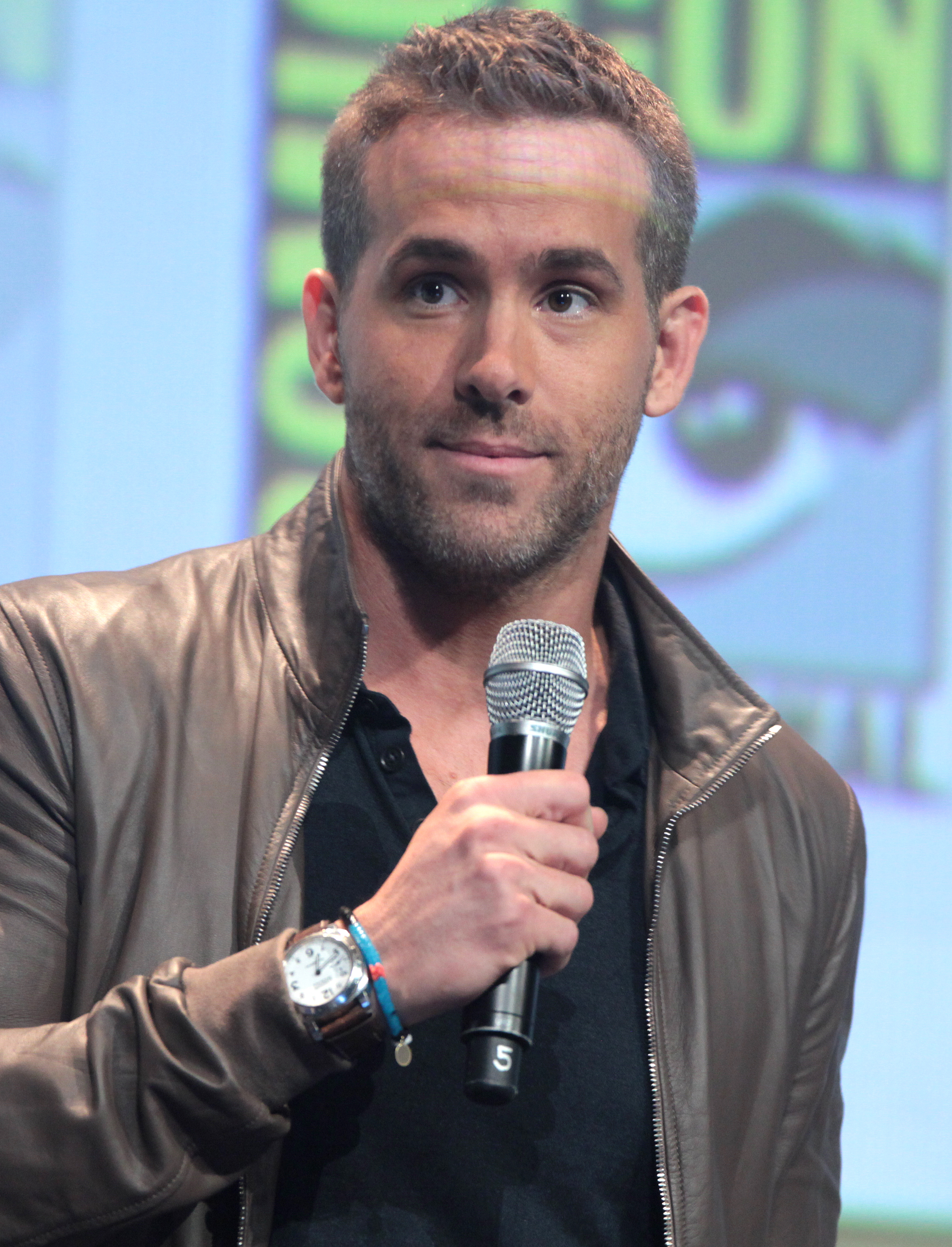
Reynolds promoting the film at the 2015 San Diego Comic-Con

In July, director Miller and several cast members attended the 2015 San Diego Comic-Con to present a trailer for the film, which received a standing ovation from attendees who requested that it be played again. Hugh Jackman was present at the panel when this occurred, during which he then ran backstage and said to the stage manager “if you don’t play the fucking footage, they are going to tear Hall H to the ground”, despite the panel’s tightly-timed schedule. Writing for Business Insider, Joshua Rivera praised the trailer for translating the humor, tone, and violence from the comics. Graeme McMillan of The Hollywood Reporter opined that Deadpool "looks like the first movie that talks to the fan audience in their own language", and praised Stan Lee's strip club cameo.

Two teasers were released on August 3 featuring Deadpool: one where he promises the arrival of the trailer and describes Fox as "the studio that inexplicably sewed his fucking mouth shut the first time", and a short tease at the end of a new trailer for Fox's Fantastic Four. The full trailer was then released, now with completed visual effects.

On December 14, a "12 Days of Deadpool" campaign began with "new images, a featurette, or maybe a new poster" released for the film each day by companies such as People, JoBlo.com, Fandango, and Mashable leading up to the release of a new trailer on Christmas Day.

=== Videos ===
For Halloween, Reynolds released a video with himself in the Deadpool costume, interacting with a group of children dressed as X-Men. He asks them questions such as "How many of you have taken a human life?"

Videos released for the film included a public service announcement parody instructing men on how to check for testicular cancer, played during an episode of The Bachelor; holiday messages for Chinese New Year and Australia Day; a cross-promotional video with Manchester United; a video starring Betty White; and an appearance on Conan where Deadpool gives Conan O'Brien a massage.

=== Billboards and posters ===
Additionally, unconventional billboards for the film were put up, including one selling it as a romance film because of the closeness of the film's release to Valentine's Day, and one featuring the emojis "💀💩L" which was described as both idiotic and brilliant.

=== Social media ===
Reynolds promoted the film on social media, taking part in a faux rivalry with Hugh Jackman on Twitter, Instagram, and Facebook. The campaign also took advantage of Snapchat, Tinder, and Pornhub. In the two weeks before the film's release, there was an average 10,000 to 20,000 tweets about it a day, which jumped to 90,000 after the early screenings. Weinstock said, "There's a lot of debate as to whether or not social media can really open a movie ... and this proves it can."

=== Other ===
In March 2015, Reynolds revealed the Deadpool costume in a parody of a famous magazine shoot of Burt Reynolds lying on a bear skin in front of a fireplace. The next month, Reynolds said in an interview on Extra with Mario Lopez that the film would be "family friendly", only to see Deadpool seemingly murder Lopez and announce that the video was an April Fools' joke and "Deadpool will of course be rated R."

In January, fan events in New York City and Los Angeles that promised "first look footage" were actually early screenings of the film. Reynolds attended the New York screening, while Tim Miller attended the Los Angeles screening with Deadpool co-creator Rob Liefeld, Lee, T.J. Miller, Reese, Wernick, and Hildebrand. For Super Bowl 50, Fox arranged for Reynolds to run a taco truck on the Friday before, serving Deadpool's favorite food chimichangas; on the Saturday, a location near the Super Bowl stadium was transformed into the bar from the film, with Reynolds and T.J. Miller present to socialize; and during the game, Fox bought a commercial for the film while Reynolds was given control of the company's Snapchat account. For the week beginning February 8, Fox teamed with Viacom to show Deadpool commercials on five different Viacom networks, covering series targeted at several different demographics, including: Teen Mom and Ridiculousness on MTV; Tosh.0, Workaholics, and @midnight on Comedy Central; Love & Hip Hop on VH1; The Golden Girls on Logo TV; and Cops on Spike. @midnight also featured a segment dedicated to the film.

== Reception ==
Discussing the campaign for Wired, Emma Grey Ellis called it "a relentless marketing siege of every platform you would think of—and some you didn't ... as crazy and unrelenting as it all is, isn't this exactly what we want from Deadpool?" Bobby Anhalt at Screen Rant called it possibly "the best film marketing campaign in the history of cinema", and noted that Deadpool's fourth wall breaking allowed "the marketing team [to] make stunts that appear as though the character himself is crafting them." HostGator's Jeremy Jensen attributed the campaign's success to Reynolds, as well as Fox embracing the film's R rating. He concluded that, "More than anything the Deadpool marketing campaign managed to create a relationship with the people who ended up going to see it. They were honest, creative, and completely relentless." Alisha Grauso of Forbes felt the campaign's success came from the marketing team understanding the character, having freedom from the usual creative constraints put on film marketers, and not revealing much of the film's actual content. Grauso also praised the marketing team for utilizing Reynolds, and said, "Audiences have been more than ready for the weird and wild, and that's the point—Fox was smart enough to see that and run with it. Most marketing campaigns don't give audiences credit for being all that intelligent or open-minded, but the campaign for Deadpool didn't hold back ... [it] was just like the character himself. Unpredictable, non sequitur, hilarious, perverse, and popping up in the strangest of places."
