= The Winner (TV series) =

- Genre: Period sitcom
- Created by: Ricky Blitt
- Written by: Ricky Blitt
- Directed by: Mark Cendrowski; Terry Hughes (pilot)
- Starring: Rob Corddry; Erinn Hayes; Keir Gilchrist; Linda Hart; Lenny Clarke
- Theme music composer: Walter Murphy
- Country of origin: United States
- Original language: English
- No. of seasons: 1
- No. of episodes: 6

Production
- Executive producers: Ricky Blitt; Seth MacFarlane
- Producers: Jeff Morton; Kevin Slattery
- Cinematography: Wayne Kennan
- Editor: Tim Ryder
- Camera setup: Multi-camera
- Running time: 22 minutes
- Production companies: Candy Bar Productions; Fuzzy Door Productions; 20th Century Fox Television

Original release
- Network: Fox
- Release: March 4 – March 18, 2007

The Winner is an American period sitcom created by Ricky Blitt that premiered on Fox on March 4, 2007. It is about a successful 43½-year-old man named Glen Abbott (portrayed by Rob Corddry) looking back to the time when he was in his 30s and living with his parents in 1994 Buffalo, New York.

Other cast members include Erinn Hayes as Alison, Keir Gilchrist as Alison's son, Josh, Lenny Clarke as Glen's father, Ron and Linda Hart as Glen's mother, Irene. The sitcom is produced by Ricky Blitt and Seth MacFarlane, who are also producers of Family Guy.

The working title of this series was Becoming Glen. A pilot was made for Fox in 2002 starring Johnny Galecki as Glen. It also starred Samantha Mathis, Gerald McRaney and Sally Struthers. The pilot was not picked up. However, the resurgence of Family Guy and the success of The 40-Year-Old Virgin in 2005 helped Blitt get a chance at making another pilot.

At Family Guy Live in Montreal on July 21, 2007, Seth MacFarlane said "It is looking like there could be a future life for The Winner." However, the series was officially cancelled on May 16, 2007.

== Characters ==
- Glen Abbott (Rob Corddry): A successful 43½-year-old man who looks back at when he was 31 and living with his parents. He had only just lost his virginity at 31 to his former English teacher. He also was trying to date his neighbor, Alison McKeller and made friends with her son, Josh McKeller.
- Ron Abbott (Lenny Clarke): The disappointed father of Glen Abbott and unhappy husband of Irene Abbott. His personality is comparable to Frank Barone of Everybody Loves Raymond or Frank Costanza of Seinfeld, although to a lesser degree.
- Josh McKeller (Keir Gilchrist): The son of Alison McKeller and friend of Glen Abbott. Glen and Josh are friends separated by several years of age leading to an unexpected friendship. Glen usually helps Josh with his relationship problems.
- Irene Abbott (Linda Hart): The loving mother of Glen. She appears to be much more supportive of Glen than her husband and is usually willing to help with dilemmas.
- Alison McKeller (Erinn Hayes): The mother of Josh and friend of Glen. Glen's exploits usually involve maintaining a relationship with her sometimes with Josh's help.

== Reception ==
With a Metacritic rating of 44/100, critical reaction was mostly negative. Labeled "dreadful" by the Miami Herald and "abrasive" by The New York Times, the show was widely criticized in the media and by audiences for its overuse of an overly-loud, "onerous" laugh track. Some reviewers, however, responded to the show's quirks; the New York Post described it as "the funniest new show this season." Ratings were dismal from the outset and only fell with each episode and Fox cancelled the show after only three weeks on the air.

== Episodes ==
Every episode of the series was written by Ricky Blitt, who is also the showrunner of the show. Additionally, Mark Cendrowski directed every episode with the exception of the pilot episode, which was directed by Terry Hughes instead.

No.	Title	Original release date	Prod. code
1	"Pilot"	March 4, 2007	1AMA79
In the magical summer of 1994, Bill Clinton was President, Snoop Dogg was climbing the charts, Olympic skater Nancy Kerrigan was clubbed on the knee by Tonya Harding and 32-year-old Glen Abbott was still living with his parents when the only girl he ever kissed, Alison McKellar, returned to town with her 14-year-old son Josh. The recently divorced Alison inspires Glen to become a grown-up to win her heart. Glen and Josh become fast friends and end up on a double date with Alison and Josh's dream girl.
2	"The Single Dates"	March 4, 2007	1AMA01
When Alison invites Glen over for dinner, Glen is elated until a co-worker convinces him that divorcees have urges and he will be expected to "put out." Embarrassed by his lack of a sexual past and fearful it will drive the love of his life away, Glen decides to visit a "massage parlor" to get a quick tutorial before his date with Alison.
3	"Broken Home"	March 11, 2007	1AMA02
With Glen spending more and more time away from home, his parents' marriage starts to unravel. Glen finds comfort in his new surrogate family, his dream girl Alison, her son and her boyfriend. When it becomes obvious he's overstayed his welcome at Alison's, Glen decides to call his first-ever "family meeting" and get his parents to fall in love with each other all over again.
4	"What Happens in Albany, Stays in Albany"	March 11, 2007	1AMA03
When Alison is unable to accompany Josh on a weekend trip to the State Spelling Bee in Albany, she asks Glen to chaperon. Since no one knows them this far from home, Glen and Josh decide to reinvent themselves. Glen wears a toupee and becomes Lance Manley, a studly airline pilot, while Josh pretends to be a cocky multiple-spelling bee champion.
5	"Glen's New Friend"	March 18, 2007	1AMA04
When Josh befriends a cool kid at school, Glen feels abandoned and replaced after he's left out of the fun. Meanwhile, Glen runs into trouble when he goes on a trip with a customer from the video store who mistakenly thinks he's gay.
6	"Hot for Teacher"	March 18, 2007	1AMA05
Series finale. When Glen poses as Josh's "dad" for a parent-teacher conference, he comes face-to-face with his old homeroom teacher, Miss Burko, who ends up giving him a private, albeit very belated, lesson in love.

== U.S. television ratings ==
Weekly rankings based on The Winner ratings.

#	Episode	Air Date	Timeslot (EST)	Season	Rating	Share	18–49	Viewers	Rank
1	"Pilot"	March 4, 2007	Sunday 8:30PM	2006–2007	4.3	7	3.5	6.39	# 51
2	"The Single Dates"	March 4, 2007	Sunday 9:30PM	2006–2007	4.8 *	7	3.1	5.56	# 71
3	"Broken Home"	March 11, 2007	Sunday 8:30PM	2006–2007	4.1	6	3.4	6.81	# 74
4	"What Happens in Albany, Stays in Albany"	March 11, 2007	Sunday 9:30PM	2006–2007	3.6	6	2.9	5.64	# 77
5	"Glen's New Friend"	March 18, 2007	Sunday 8:30PM	2006–2007	3.6	6	2.7	5.55	# 72
6	"Hot for Teacher"	March 18, 2007	Sunday 9:30PM	2006–2007	3.5	5	2.5	5.14	# 79

* Represents the average rating for Fox in the 9pm hour (which The Winner shared with Family Guy)

Key: Rating is the estimated percentage of all TVs tuned to the show, share is the percentage of all TVs in use that are tuned in. Viewers is the estimated number of actual people watching, in millions, while ranking is the approximate ranking of the show against all prime-time TV shows for the week (Monday through the following Sunday).
