= Ricky Blitt =

Canadian comedy screenwriter

- Born: Richard Michael Blitt
- Education: McGill University (BA); American Film Institute (MFA)
- Occupations: Writer, director, producer, actor
- Relatives: Barry Blitt (brother)

Richard Michael Blitt is a Canadian screenwriter, film director, producer, and actor who has been based in Los Angeles since 1994.

Early in his career, Blitt was a writer on The Jeff Foxworthy Show and Politically Incorrect with Bill Maher. He was one of the original writers on Family Guy, where he would go on to become a producer and write several episodes. He also appeared as an actor in Family Guy's first ever live action sequence alongside Alyssa Milano.

He co-wrote and starred in a Fox pilot in 2003 titled Blitt Happens starring Jim Parsons and directed by The Farrelly Brothers.

He created and was the executive producer of The Winner starring Rob Corddry for Fox. He also created the series Romantically Challenged, re-teaming with its star Alyssa Milano on ABC.

Ricky has been a series regular and writer for the Peter Farrelly-Bobby Mort created comedy Loudermilk for the past three seasons on the Audience network. He co-wrote Dear Santa (2024) with Farrelly.

In film, Blitt won a Perspectives of the Media award for his screenplay for Fox Searchlight's The Ringer. Blitt made his directing debut with his film Hit By Lightning starring Jon Cryer.

Blitt also owns a production company, Candy Bar Productions.

== Personal life ==
Blitt was raised in Côte Saint-Luc, Quebec, a municipality on the Island of Montreal. He is a graduate of McGill University and attended the AFI Conservatory. His older brother is magazine illustrator Barry Blitt. He is Jewish.
