= List of accolades received by Deadpool (film) =

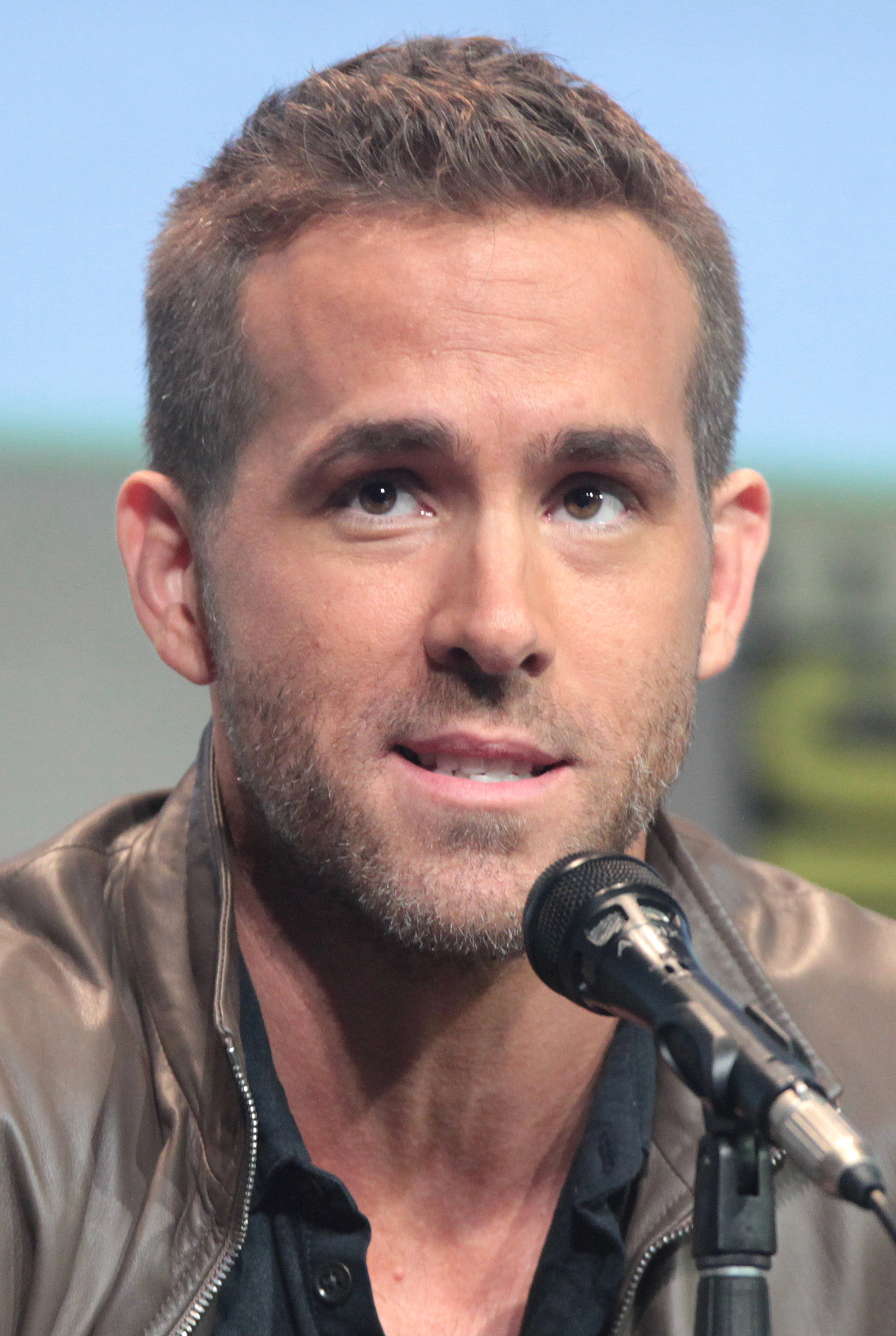
- Producer and star Ryan Reynolds received the most nominations for Deadpool with a total of sixteen.
Awards and nominations
Award	Wins	Nominations
All Def Movie Awards	1	1
American Cinema Editors Awards	0	1
Casting Society of America Artios Awards	0	1
Critics' Choice Movie Awards	2	4
Directors Guild of America Awards	0	1
Empire Awards	0	5
Golden Globe Awards	0	2
Golden Reel Awards	0	2
Golden Trailer Awards	2	6
Grand Clio Key Art Awards	2	2
Guild of Music Supervisors Awards	0	1
Hollywood Music in Media Awards	0	1
Hugo Awards	0	1
ICG Publicists Awards	1	1
Imagen Awards	0	1
Makeup Artists and Hair Stylists Guild Awards	0	1
MTV Movie & TV Awards	2	8
People's Choice Awards	2	4
Producers Guild of America Awards	0	1
San Diego Film Critics Society Awards	0	1
Satellite Awards	0	1
Saturn Awards	1	3
St. Louis Film Critics Association Awards	0	3
Teen Choice Awards	2	6
Visual Effects Society Awards	0	1
Writers Guild of America Awards	0	1

Totals (Note: Certain award groups do not simply award one winner. They acknowledge several different recipients, have runners-up, and have third place. Since this is a specific recognition and is different from losing an award, runner-up mentions are considered wins in this award tally. For simplification and to avoid errors, each award in this list has been presumed to have had a prior nomination.)
- Wins: 15
- Nominations: 60

Deadpool is a 2016 American superhero film based on the Marvel Comics character of the same name, distributed by 20th Century Fox. It is the eighth installment of the X-Men film series. The film was directed by Tim Miller from a screenplay by Rhett Reese and Paul Wernick, and stars Ryan Reynolds in the title role alongside Morena Baccarin, Ed Skrein, T.J. Miller, Gina Carano, Leslie Uggams, Brianna Hildebrand, and Stefan Kapičić. In Deadpool, Wade Wilson hunts the man who gave him mutant abilities, but also a scarred physical appearance, as the wisecracking, fourth wall-breaking antihero Deadpool.

After spending ten years in "development hell", Deadpool received a green light from Fox with a much smaller budget than is usually given to a big superhero film, $58 million. This gave the production team—including Miller in his directorial debut— the freedom to create the film that they desired, after Reynolds' portrayal of the character in X-Men Origins: Wolverine was not well received. Focus was placed on reproducing the tone, humor, and violence of the comics. Deadpool premiered at the Grand Rex in Paris on February 8, 2016, and was released in the United States on February 12, 2016. The film became a financial and critical success, grossing over $783 million and receiving an 85% approval rating on Rotten Tomatoes.

The film has received numerous awards and nominations, recognizing the performance of the cast, particularly Reynolds as Deadpool; several technical areas, including the film's makeup, sound, and visual effects; and the film's extensive marketing campaign. Deadpool was nominated for two Golden Globe Awards, as well as four Critics' Choice Movie Awards (winning two), a Directors Guild of America Award, five Empire Awards, seven Golden Trailer Awards (winning two), two Grand Clio Key Art Awards for marketing (winning both), eight MTV Movie Awards (winning two), a Producers Guild of America Award, four People's Choice Awards (winning two), six Teen Choice Awards (winning two), a Writers Guild of America Award, and three Saturn Awards (winning one). The film also has a Hugo Award nomination, and appeared on several critics' top ten lists for 2016.

== Accolades ==
Accolades received by Deadpool (film)
Award	Date of ceremony	Category	Recipient(s)	Result	Ref.
MTV Movie & TV Awards	April 10, 2016	Best Female Performance	Morena Baccarin	Nominated	
MTV Movie & TV Awards	April 10, 2016	Best Action Performance	Ryan Reynolds	Nominated	
MTV Movie & TV Awards	April 10, 2016	Best Comedic Performance	Ryan Reynolds	Won	
MTV Movie & TV Awards	April 10, 2016	Best Male Performance	Ryan Reynolds	Nominated	
MTV Movie & TV Awards	April 10, 2016	Best Kiss	Morena Baccarin and Ryan Reynolds	Nominated	
MTV Movie & TV Awards	April 10, 2016	Best Villain	Ed Skrein	Nominated	
MTV Movie & TV Awards	April 10, 2016	Best Fight	Ryan Reynolds vs. Ed Skrein	Won	
MTV Movie & TV Awards	April 10, 2016	Best Movie	Deadpool	Nominated	
Golden Trailer Awards	May 4, 2016	Best of Show	"Trailer B – Power Red"	Nominated	
Golden Trailer Awards	May 4, 2016	Best of Show	"DOM TRLR E: Power Red Online"	Nominated	
Golden Trailer Awards	May 4, 2016	Best Action	"DOM TRLR E: Power Red Online"	Won	
Golden Trailer Awards	May 4, 2016	Best Music	"Trailer B – Power Red"	Won	
Golden Trailer Awards	May 4, 2016	Most Original	"Trailer B – Power Red"	Nominated	
Golden Trailer Awards	May 4, 2016	Best Comedy TV Spot	"Night"	Nominated	
Golden Trailer Awards	May 4, 2016	Best Viral Video Campaign for a Movie	"The Gift of Deadpool"	Nominated	
Teen Choice Awards	July 31, 2016	Choice Movie: Action/Adventure	Deadpool	Won	
Teen Choice Awards	July 31, 2016	Choice Movie Actor: Action/Adventure	Ryan Reynolds	Nominated	
Teen Choice Awards	July 31, 2016	Choice Movie: Hissy Fit	Ryan Reynolds	Won	
Teen Choice Awards	July 31, 2016	Choice Movie Actress: Action/Adventure	Morena Baccarin	Nominated	
Teen Choice Awards	July 31, 2016	Choice Movie: Villain	Ed Skrein	Nominated	
Teen Choice Awards	July 31, 2016	Choice Movie: Breakout Star	Brianna Hildebrand	Nominated	
Imagen Awards	September 9, 2016	Best Actress – Feature Film	Morena Baccarin	Nominated	
Grand Clio Key Art Awards	October 20, 2016	Best Out of Home Marketing	"Emoji Billboard"	Won	
Grand Clio Key Art Awards	October 20, 2016	Best Integrated Marketing Campaign	Deadpool	Won	
Hollywood Music in Media Awards	November 17, 2016	Best Soundtrack Album	Deadpool	Nominated	
Hollywood Music in Media Awards	November 17, 2016	Outstanding Music Supervision – Film	John Houlihan	Nominated	
Critics' Choice Movie Awards	December 11, 2016	Best Action Movie	Deadpool	Nominated	
Critics' Choice Movie Awards	December 11, 2016	Best Comedy	Deadpool	Won	
Critics' Choice Movie Awards	December 11, 2016	Best Actor in an Action Movie	Ryan Reynolds	Nominated	
Critics' Choice Movie Awards	December 11, 2016	Best Actor in a Comedy	Ryan Reynolds	Won	
San Diego Film Critics Society Awards	December 12, 2016	Best Comedic Performance	Ryan Reynolds	Nominated	
Satellite Awards	December 18, 2016	Best Visual Effects	Deadpool	Nominated	
St. Louis Gateway Film Critics Association Awards	December 18, 2016	Best Action Film	Deadpool	Nominated	
St. Louis Gateway Film Critics Association Awards	December 18, 2016	Best Comedy	Deadpool	Nominated	
St. Louis Gateway Film Critics Association Awards	December 18, 2016	Best Scene	"Opening Credits"	Nominated	
Golden Globe Awards	January 8, 2017	Best Motion Picture – Musical or Comedy	Deadpool	Nominated	
Golden Globe Awards	January 8, 2017	Best Actor – Motion Picture Comedy or Musical	Ryan Reynolds	Nominated	
People's Choice Awards	January 18, 2017	Favorite Movie	Deadpool	Nominated	
People's Choice Awards	January 18, 2017	Favorite Action Movie	Deadpool	Won	
People's Choice Awards	January 18, 2017	Favorite Movie Actor	Ryan Reynolds	Won	
People's Choice Awards	January 18, 2017	Favorite Action Actor	Ryan Reynolds	Nominated	
Casting Society of America Artios Awards	January 19, 2017	Big Budget – Comedy	Ronna Kress, Jennifer Page, Corinne Clark	Nominated	
American Cinema Editors Awards	January 27, 2017	Best Edited Feature Film – Comedy or Musical	Julian Clarke	Nominated	
Producers Guild of America Awards	January 28, 2017	Best Theatrical Motion Picture	Simon Kinberg, Ryan Reynolds, Lauren Shuler Donner	Nominated	
Directors Guild of America Awards	February 4, 2017	Outstanding Directorial Achievement – First-Time Feature Film	Tim Miller	Nominated	
Visual Effects Society Awards	February 7, 2017	Outstanding Created Environment in a Photoreal Feature	Freeway Assault – Seth Hill, Jedediah Smith, Laurent Taillefer, Marc-Antoine Paquin	Nominated	
Guild of Music Supervisors Awards	February 16, 2017	Best Music Supervision for Films Budgeted Over $25 Million	John Houlihan	Nominated	
Golden Reel Awards	February 19, 2017	Feature English Language – Dialogue/ADR	Jim Brookshire, Wayne Lemmer, Teri Dorman, Ben Beardwood, Laura Graham, R.J. Kizer	Nominated	
Golden Reel Awards	February 19, 2017	Feature English Language – Effects/Foley	Wayne Lemmer, Jim Brookshire, Dan O’Connel, John T Cucci, Craig Henighan, Warren Hendriks, Ai Ling Lee	Nominated	
Makeup Artists and Hair Stylists Guild Awards	February 19, 2017	Feature Motion Picture: Best Special Makeup Effects	Bill Corso and Andrew Clement	Nominated	
Writers Guild of America Awards	February 19, 2017	Best Adapted Screenplay	Rhett Reese and Paul Wernick	Nominated	
All Def Movie Awards	February 22, 2017	Best Superhero Token Sidekick	Leslie Uggams	Won	
ICG Publicists Awards	February 24, 2017	Maxwell Weinberg Award	Deadpool	Won	
Empire Awards	March 19, 2017	Best Comedy	Deadpool	Nominated	
Empire Awards	March 19, 2017	Best Actor	Ryan Reynolds	Nominated	
Empire Awards	March 19, 2017	Best Film	Deadpool	Nominated	
Empire Awards	March 19, 2017	Best Screenplay	Deadpool	Won	
Empire Awards	March 19, 2017	Best Costume Design	Deadpool	Nominated	
Saturn Awards	June 21, 2017	Best Comic-to-Film Motion Picture	Deadpool	Nominated	
Saturn Awards	June 21, 2017	Best Actor in a Film	Ryan Reynolds	Won	
Saturn Awards	June 21, 2017	Best Film Screenplay	Rhett Reese and Paul Wernick	Nominated	
Hugo Awards	August 11, 2017	Best Dramatic Presentation – Long Form	Tim Miller, Rhett Reese, Paul Wernick	Nominated	
