= Hit by Lightning =

Hit By Lightning
- Directed by: Ricky Blitt
- Written by: Ricky Blitt
- Produced by: Chantal Chamandy; J. B. Rogers; Executive producer; Michael Ades
- Starring: Jon Cryer; Will Sasso; Stéphanie Szostak
- Cinematography: Arthur E. Cooper
- Edited by: Simon Webb
- Music by: Chantal Chamandy; Joel Campbell
- Production companies: Chantal Chamandy Entertainment; Zed Filmworks
- Distributed by: Spotlight Picture; Phase 4 Films
- Release date: July 23, 2014 (Montreal)
- Running time: 89 minutes
- Countries: Canada; United States
- Language: English
- Budget: $1 million

Hit By Lightning is a 2014 black comedy film written and directed by Ricky Blitt and produced by Chantal Chamandy, as his directorial debut and her film producer debut. Filmed on locations in Ottawa and Los Angeles, the film stars Jon Cryer, Will Sasso, Stéphanie Szostak, and Jed Rees.

== Plot ==
Ricky is a lonely, 40-something restaurant manager and is best friends with Seth, an equally single accountant. Seth is constantly trying to get him to be his wingman.

Tearing him away from his two black cats and hockey on TV, Ricky and Seth go to his restaurant, trying to pick up women by pretending to be looking for actresses for an upcoming film. Going to the wedding of the only other guy from their class who hadn't married, Ricky asks God to find him someone before he's hit by lightning or killed by terrorists.

Soon after Ricky sees a pop-up ad for E-Happily, he spontaneously signs up. The next day, the restaurant's 27-year-old busboy tells him he met his fiancée on the same site. Finally getting a response to his profile, he meets with Seth, telling him he found a match although admittedly he has no idea what she looks like.

Skeptical, Seth goes to the restaurant where Ricky is meeting Danita. They get along well, she appreciates his humor, is also a cat person, they both like hockey and have similar interests. He finally feels he has met his ideal woman. They sleep together, and she tells him he was the only person willing to meet her without a photo.

Seth shows up at Ricky's, seeking details. Shocked, he reiterates that Danita's a ten, and he's a four, so she must have a major flaw. Meeting for lunch, when he says she's perfect, she runs off, upset. Ten days later he's still in a funk. Seth tries to get him to go out and prowl.

Finally Danita calls. Meeting for lunch, she tells Ricky she responded on E-Happily because of his profile, his openness. However, one significant problem arises: she's been miserably married for nine years to an obsessive, abusive husband, so she says she can never see him again.

Danita invites Ricky to an open-air screening of a movie in the cemetery. She doesn't want to stop seeing him, so she states matter-of-factly that they must kill her husband so they can be together. Ricky is so smitten he agrees.

Visiting Seth at work, Ricky tells him about needing to kill Danita's obsessive husband. He insists they rewatch Body Heat, so Ricky rethinks doing it. As it doesn't work, upon Seth's insistence, they go to Danita's husband's book signing—the abusive husband Ben is an ex-rabbi-turned-author—which doesn't dissuade Ricky either.

Finally, Seth convinces Ricky to go and spy on the couple, as he has seen they go to a nearby restaurant chain every Saturday night. Recognizing Seth from the book signing, Ben invites them to join their table for dinner. When told Ricky has an unfinished novel, he offers to read it. Later on, Danita calls Ricky and upon discovering the guys went to spy on them, she hangs up, disappointed.

Seth signs up to E-Happily, and soon gets engaged. Meanwhile, Danita shows at Ricky's, confessing she may have initially planned to use him to murder Ben, but had sincerely fallen for him. Upset, he asks her to leave. Then, he asks her to swear on one of her cats that she loves him.

They plan on getting Ricky into their house under the guise of Ben proofing his book. Danita mentions the plot of the book is based on the actual story of him killing his first wife. After dinner, Ben takes them on a drive to the cemetery where they watched the movie together, as he'd seen them on their date. Both men pull their guns, but Ricky shoots Ben dead when he barrages him with insults.

Seth turns up to help dispose of the body. For the next two weeks Danita and Ricky secretly meet up in the Catholic church, then suddenly she leaves town. Nine months later, Ricky's cop cousin tells him a mass murderer confessed to killing Ben Jacobs. Again at the cemetery movie showing, Danita shows up, explaining she left because the police wouldn't leave her alone. The serial killer news brought her back. The happy couple do a testimonial ad for E-Happily.

== Cast ==
- Jon Cryer as Ricky Miller
- Will Sasso as Seth
- Stéphanie Szostak as Danita Jacobs
- Jed Rees as Rabbi Ben Jacobs
- Chantal Chamandy as Tracey
- Alexis Maitland as Ashlee
- Richard Roy Sutton as Dylan

== Production ==
When interviewed by CJAD radio of Montreal, Chantal Chamandy spoke toward the production of this film. One year after creation of her production company Chantal Chamandy Entertainment, Chamandy began production on the film Hit By Lightning. The film was shot over a 17-day period during summer 2013 in a studio in metro Ottawa, locations through the city, as well as locations in Los Angeles. The film was budgeted at Can$1 million provided by private funding and through Telefilm Canada, and had no cost overruns. Ricky Blitt had written the script and was invited to Montreal by Chamandy to direct the film as his directorial debut. Jon Cryer was production's first choice for the lead role, and he accepted the role after discussing the script with Blitt. The film is described by Cryer as "sort of a mixture of Body Heat meets The 40-Year-Old Virgin.

What I loved about the script was that it was a romantic comedy with a new twist. It's a really sweet story but it has a real darkness to it. I haven't done a romantic comedy in a long, long time and it took a lovely script to make me do this kind of thing again

— Jon Cryer

Will Sasso was production's first choice for the supporting role of Seth. After he and Cryer had met and discussed it, they clicked and he also came immediately aboard. Casting was completed within six months. To take advantage of Canadian tax credits, most of the project was filmed in Ottawa, and post-production and music scoring was done in Montreal.

== Release ==
Film's banner poster at the Just For Laughs Festival

The film had its world premiere at the Just For Laughs Festival on July 23, 2014 in Montreal, and is slated for VOD release in both Canada and the United States on October 31, 2014.

== Reception ==
Rotten Tomatoes, a review aggregator, reports that 11% of nine surveyed critics gave the film a positive review; the average rating was 3.1/10. Metacritic rated it 31/100 based on eight reviews. Sheri Linden of The Hollywood Reporter called it "a flat, awkward mashup" of romantic comedy and thriller. Ben Kenigsberg of The New York Times described it as "a laugh-deprived Seinfeld episode". Martin Tsai of the Los Angeles Times wrote that it "manages to make dark comedy fresh by combining two formulas."
