= Jed Rees =

Canadian actor (born 1970)

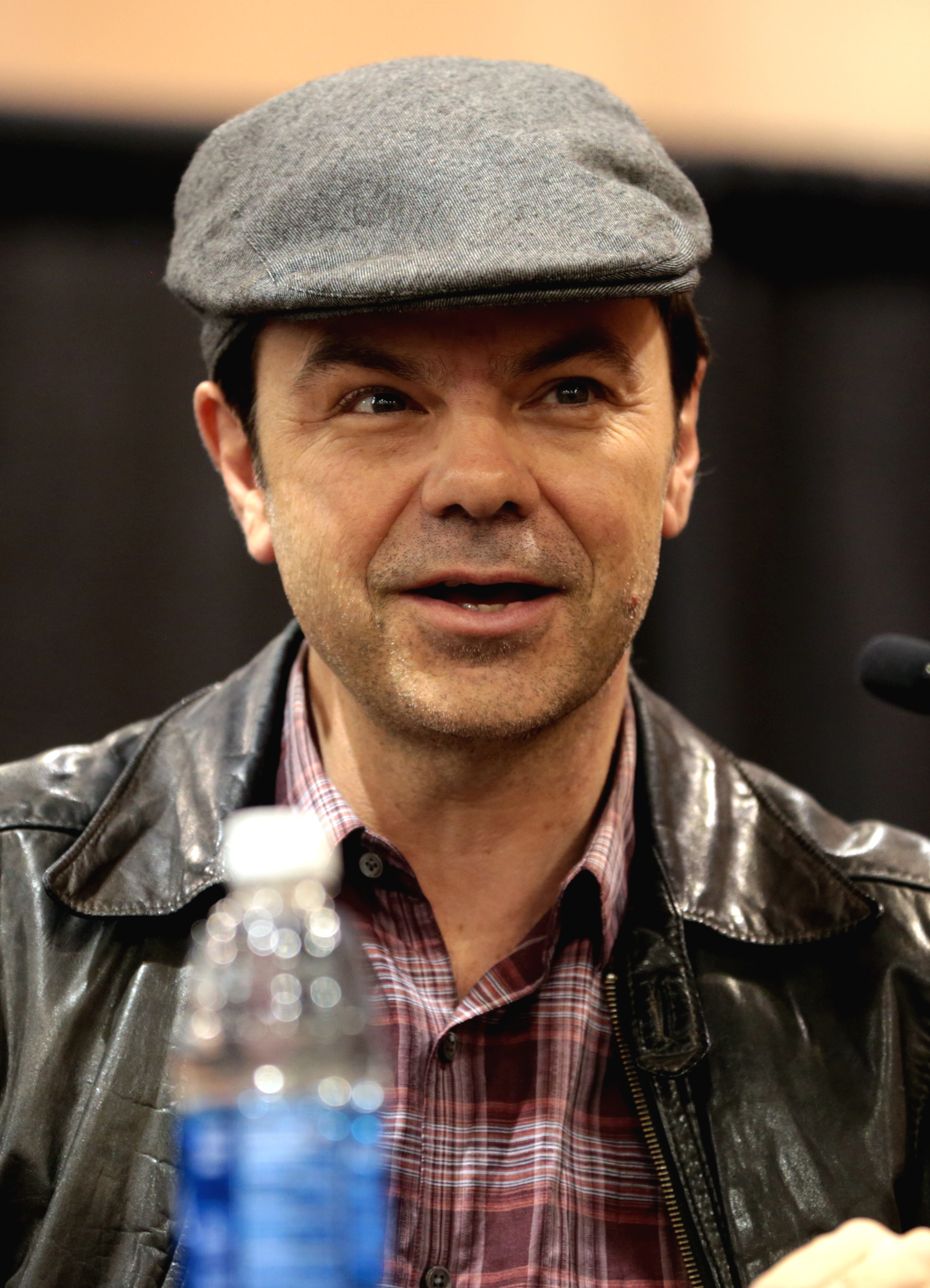
- Rees in November 2017
- Born: March 8, 1970 (age 56); Vancouver, British Columbia, Canada
- Occupation: Actor
- Years active: 1990–present

Jed Rees (born March 8, 1970) is a Canadian actor, best known for his roles in movies such as Galaxy Quest (1999), The Ringer (2005), Deadpool (2016), and American Made (2017).

== Early life ==
Rees studied music for two years in college before transferring into Business Administration under the misconception that it would teach him how to make money. During his final year in school, he discovered acting and moved to New York City, where he studied theatre for two years.

== Filmography ==
Year	Film	Role	Notes
1990–1992	Neon Rider		TV series; 2 episodes: "Night of the Living Ed" and "Hacker"
1991	21 Jump Street	George	TV series; 1 episode; "Under the Influence"
1994	Sleeping with Strangers	Young Gardener	
1994	Sin & Redemption	Boy #2	TV film
1994	Moment of Truth: Broken Pledges	Frank	TV film
1994–1995	Hawkeye	Peevey	TV series; 13 episodes
1995	Little Criminals	Chet	TV film
1995	The Final Cut	Morrisey	
1995	Eye Level		TV film
1996	Urban Safari	Delivery Boy	
1996	The Prisoner of Zenda, Inc.	Buddy	TV film
1996	Sliders	Hipster	TV series; 1 episode: "Time Again and World"
1996	Fear	Knobby	
1996	The Sentinel	Sal	TV series; 1 episode
1996	Lonesome Dove: The Outlaw Years		TV series; 1 episode
1997	Contagious	Doug Lamoreaux	TV film
1997–1999	The Outer Limits	J.D. Kelton	TV series; 2 episodes
1997	The X-Files	Lucas Menand	TV series; 1 episode: "Synchrony"
1997	Viper	Benny	TV series; 1 episode: "Cat and Mouse"
1997	Police Academy: The Series	Ben Gordon	TV series; 1 episode
1998	Goldrush: A Real Life Alaskan Adventure	Sailor	TV film
1998	The Net	Justin Newby	TV series; 1 episode: "Jump Vector"
1998	The Crow: Stairway to Heaven	Nytmare	TV series; 1 episode: "Never Say Die"
1998–1999	Night Man	Mac	TV series; 2 episodes: "Double Double" and "The Ultraweb"
1999	Lake Placid	Deputy Burke	
1999	Dudley Do-Right	Lavar	
1999	Daydrift	Vic Harlow	
1999	Galaxy Quest	Teb	
2001–2004	The Chris Isaak Show	Anson Drubner	TV series; 47 episodes
2002	Men With Brooms	Eddie Strombeck	Nominated for a Canadian Comedy Award
2003	Luck	Andrew	
2005	Elizabethtown	Chuck Hasboro	
2005	Ghost Whisperer	Marty Golden	TV series; 1 episode: "Undead Comic"
2005	The Ringer	Glen	
2007	CSI: Crime Scene Investigation	Jay Finch	TV series; 1 episode: "Leaving Las Vegas"
2008	The Onion Movie	Wizard Proteus	
2008	Chuck	Nathan Edward "Ned" Ryerson	TV series; 1 episode: "Chuck Versus Santa Claus"
2010	For Christ's Sake	Robert	
2010	Cold Case	Evan Mazer '10	TV series; 1 episode: "Almost Paradise"
2010	The Con Artist	Larry	
2011	Fanboy	Todd	Short film
2011	Brain Trust	Prof. Nelson Kirby	TV film
2011	Cookie	Bernard	Short film
2012	Family Guy	(voice)	Animated TV series; 1 episode: "Ratings Guy"
2013	Garbage	Lenny Eaton	Best Actor, WorldFest Houston
2013	Pretty Little Liars	Hector Lime	TV series; 2 episodes; "Cat's Cradle" & "Face Time" S4 Epi 3-4.
2013	Grand Theft Auto V	The Local Population	Video game
2014	Hit by Lightning	Rabbi Ben Jacobs	
2015	NCIS	Voight Hex	Episode: Status Update
2016	Deadpool	Jared / Agent Smith / The Recruiter	
2016	Castle	Mr. Flynn	Episode: "Crossfire"
2016	Dark Harvest	Skeezy	
2016	Pup Star	Roland	
2016	NCIS: Los Angeles	Gary Dinkle	TV series; 1 episode; “Crazy Train” Season 8 Ep. 7
2017	Pup Star: Better 2Gether	Roland	
2017	Bones	Alan	TV series; 1 episode; "The Brain In The Bot" Season 12 Ep. 2
2017	American Made	Louis Finkle	
2018	Pup Star: World Tour	Roland	
2018	Pup Star: Christmas	Roland	
2019	Pup Academy	King (voice)	TV series; 7 episodes
2020	Love, Guaranteed	Bill Jones	
2021	Maid	Gary Whippler	TV mini series; 1 episode
2022	Charmed	The Tallyman	TV series; 4 episodes
2021–2022	The Mysterious Benedict Society	Jeffers	TV series; 7 episodes
2023	Rabbit Hole	Manfred Larter	TV series; 3 episodes
2024	Reginald the Vampire	Altus	TV series; 4 episodes
2024	Tracker	Errol Price	TV series; Episode: "Aurora"
2025	Resident Alien	Sedrick	TV series; Episode: "Soul Providers"

== Awards and recognition ==
Award	Year	Film	Role	Result
Pretty Funny Male Performance	2003	Men With Brooms	Eddie Strombeck	Nominated
Best Actor Grand Award, WorldFest Houston	2012	Garbage	Lenny Eaton	Won
