= Chantal Chamandy =

- Origin: Alexandria, Egypt
- Genres: Adult Contemporary, Dance-pop, World
- Years active: 1980-present
- Label: Ninemuse
- Website: www.chantalchamandy.com

Chantal Chamandy is a Canadian singer and entertainer based in Montreal, Quebec. She previously performed under the names Chantal Condor and Chantal.

== Early life ==
Chamandy was born in Alexandria, Egypt. Her father was Greek and Egyptian and her mother was born in Egypt to Lebanese parents. The family moved to Montreal, Canada when Chamandy was six years old. She sang in her church choir.

== Career ==
Her first success was as part of Voggue, a disco duo she formed with Angela Songui. In 1980, the duo released its first self-titled album, which contains the singles "Love Buzz", "Here We Are" and their most successful single, "Dancin' the Night Away". In 1981, a second album was released on Matra Records, containing the singles "I Want To Dance" and "Sunstruck Lovers". Voggue disbanded in 1990.

After Voggue, Chantal recorded as a solo act, which led to an album deal with Epic Records, and she released the album Chantal Condor the following year. Off of the album came the singles "Marinero" (backed with "Don't You Want My Love") and "Nightmare". She received a Juno Award nomination in 1990 for Most Promising Female Vocalist of the Year.

She dropped use of her last name, releasing Chantal, on the Columbia Records label in 1989. The single "A Little Lovin'" became a charting single on Canada's RPM 100 Singles chart.

In 1991 she became a member of the French-Canadian dance quartet Collage and appeared on their first and only album, but soon left the group. They then became a trio and the album was re-released without Chantal on the cover.

She did not release new material again until 2006, when she released a series of singles on her own independent label Ninemuse.

She also used a number of unconventional strategies to get her name and material back into the public eye, including a marketing campaign on public transit and selling her single "Feels Like Love" for $1 a copy in the Dollarama chain of dollar stores, which resulted in the single selling over 10,000 copies and being picked up for sale in conventional record stores. She released Love Needs You in 2006 later the same year. "Feels Like Love" received airplay on U.S. Adult Contemporary radio.

On 7 September 2007, she performed a concert in front of the Great Pyramid of Giza in Egypt in conjunction with the Cairo Symphony Orchestra. That performance was released on album and DVD in 2008 as Beladi, and was also made available for broadcast on PBS in the United States.

Chamandy has done over 15 TV commercials as well as roles in films also credited with an appearance in 2014's Hit by Lightning, which she produced, and also wrote the score and included some of her songs in the sound track. She was also a producer on Allen Sunshine, the directorial debut of her son Harley Chamandy, through her firm Mother and Son Films.

== Albums ==
- Chantal Condor (1986)
- Chantal (1989)
- Love Needs You (August 15, 2006)
- Beladi (2008)

== Singles ==
- "Hands Up" (1987)
- "Marinero" (1985)
- "Nightmare" (1986)
- "A Little Lovin'" (1989)
- "Angel In Your Eyes" (1992)
- "You Want Me" (January 1, 2006)
- "Feels Like Love" (August 8, 2006)

=== Chantal album (1989) ===
List of track titles (writers) - Chantal performs lead vocals for all songs, unless noted otherwise.

- "A Little Lovin'" (Brian Macleod)
- "Angel in Your Eyes" (Brian Macleod)
- "Don't You Want My Love" (Aldo Nova)
- "Can't Dance Forever" (Ken LeRay)
- "Let Me Be the One" (Peter Wood, Chantal) - Duet with Chantal and Michael Ruff
- "Sometimes Love Can Heal a Broken Heart" (Peter Wood, Chantal)
- "Imagination" (Ross, Bayyan)
- "You've Got Potential" (Michael Jay, Alan Scott)
- "Some Kind of Magic" (M. Mangold, Aldo Nova)
- "Ready or Note?" (Peter Wood, Chantal)
- "Bells" (D. Allen, R. Van Hoy, M. Humpris)

Chantal was produced by Peter Wood

== DVDs ==
- Beladi: A Night at The Pyramids (2008)

== Filmography ==
- Discussions in Bioethics: Critical Choice (1987) (Short film)
- Miles to Go (1986) (TV movie) as Meg (as Chantal Condor)
- Wednesday's Children: Robert (1987) (Short film)
- Crazy Moon (1987) as Cleveland's Girlfriend (as Chantal Condor)
- Scanners III: The Takeover (1992) as Female Guest - one of the sequels to Scanners
- Hit By Lightning (2014) as Tracey
