= List of awards and nominations received by Al Pacino =

Al Pacino awards and nominations
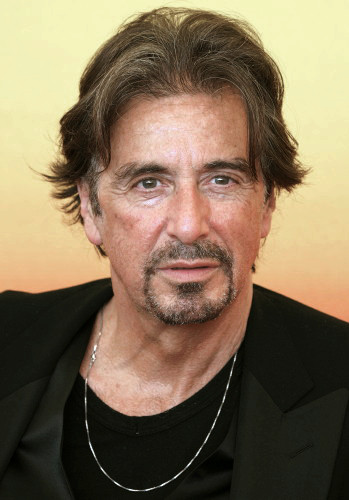
- Pacino at the 61st Venice International Film Festival in 2004
Awards and nominations
Award	Wins	Nominations
Academy Awards	1	9
Actor Awards	2	7
British Academy Film Awards	1	5
Primetime Emmy Awards	2	3
Golden Globe Awards	4	19
Tony Awards	2	3

Totals (Note: Certain award groups do not simply award one winner. They acknowledge several different recipients, have runners-up, and have third place. Since this is a specific recognition and is different from losing an award, runner-up mentions are considered wins in this award tally. For simplification and to avoid errors, each award in this list has been presumed to have had a prior nomination.)
- Wins: 41
- Nominations: 151

This article is a List of awards and nominations received by Al Pacino.

Al Pacino is an American actor known for his roles on stage and screen. He has received his numerous accolades including an Academy Award, a British Academy Film Award, two Primetime Emmy Awards, four Golden Globe Awards, two Actor Awards, and two Tony Awards as well as a nomination for a Grammy Award. His honorary awards include the Honorary Golden Lion at Venice Film Festival in 1994, the Golden Globe Cecil B. DeMille Award in 2001, the National Medal of Arts in 2011, and the Kennedy Center Honors in 2016.

Pacino won the Academy Award for Best Actor for his portrayal of a blind retired Lieutenant Colonel in the drama Scent of a Woman (1992). He was also Oscar-nominated for his roles as Michael Corleone in the epic gangster film The Godfather (1972), Frank Serpico in the crime film Serpico (1973), Michael Corleone in gangster film The Godfather Part II (1974), Sonny Wortzik in the crime drama Dog Day Afternoon (1975), a Baltimore defense attorney in the legal drama ...And Justice for All (1979), Alphonse "Big Boy" Caprice in the action crime film Dick Tracy (1990), Richard Roma in the tragedy Glengarry Glen Ross (1992), and Jimmy Hoffa in the epic crime film The Irishman (2019).

On television, Pacino won the Primetime Emmy Award for Outstanding Lead Actor in a Miniseries or a Movie, the Golden Globe Award for Best Actor – Miniseries or Television Film, and the Screen Actors Guild Award for Outstanding Actor in a Miniseries or Television Movie for his portrayals of Roy Cohn in the HBO miniseries Angels in America (2003) and the Jack Kevorkian the HBO biopic You Don't Know Jack (2010). He was Emmy-nominated for his performance as the title role in the HBO film Phil Spector (2013). He received a nomination for the Golden Globe Award for Best Actor – Television Series Drama for his dual role as a Nazi evading arrest in the Amazon Prime Video conspiracy drama Hunters (2020–2023).

On stage, he won two Tony Awards, his first for Best Featured Actor in a Play for playing a drug addict in the Don Petersen play Does a Tiger Wear a Necktie? (1969), and his second for Best Actor in a Play for playing a Vietnam War army trainee in the David Rabe play The Basic Training of Pavlo Hummel (1977). He was Tony-nominated for playing Shylock in the revival of the William Shakespeare play The Merchant of Venice (2011). He also received two Drama Desk Awards, an Obie Award, and a Theatre World Award for his performances on stage.

== Major awards ==
=== Academy Awards ===
Year	Category	Nominated work	Result	Ref.
1973	Best Supporting Actor	The Godfather	Nominated	
1974	Best Actor	Serpico	Nominated	
1975	Best Actor	The Godfather Part II	Nominated	
1976	Best Actor	Dog Day Afternoon	Nominated	
1980	Best Actor	...And Justice for All	Nominated	
1991	Best Supporting Actor	Dick Tracy	Nominated	
1993	Best Supporting Actor	Glengarry Glen Ross	Nominated	
1993	Best Actor	Scent of a Woman	Won	
2020	Best Supporting Actor	The Irishman	Nominated	

=== Actor Awards ===
Year	Category	Nominated work	Result	Ref.
2004	Outstanding Male Actor in a Miniseries or Television Movie	Angels in America	Won	
2011	Outstanding Male Actor in a Miniseries or Television Movie	You Don't Know Jack	Won	
2014	Outstanding Male Actor in a Miniseries or Television Movie	Phil Spector	Nominated	
2020	Outstanding Male Actor in a Supporting Role	The Irishman	Nominated	
2020	Outstanding Cast in a Motion Picture	The Irishman	Nominated	
2020	Outstanding Cast in a Motion Picture	Once Upon a Time in Hollywood	Nominated	
2022	Outstanding Cast in a Motion Picture	House of Gucci	Nominated	
2027	SAG-AFTRA Life Achievement Award	—N/a	Won	

=== BAFTA Awards ===
Year	Category	Nominated work	Result	Ref.
1973	Most Promising Newcomer to Leading Film Roles	The Godfather	Nominated	
1975	Best Actor in a Leading Role	Serpico	Nominated	
1976	Best Actor in a Leading Role	Dog Day Afternoon / The Godfather Part II	Won	
1991	Best Actor in a Supporting Role	Dick Tracy	Nominated	
2020	Best Actor in a Supporting Role	The Irishman	Nominated	

=== Emmy Awards ===
Year	Category	Nominated work	Result	Ref.
Primetime Emmy Award
2004	Outstanding Lead Actor in a Miniseries or Movie	Angels in America	Won	
2010	Outstanding Lead Actor in a Miniseries or Movie	You Don't Know Jack	Won	
2013	Outstanding Lead Actor in a Miniseries or Movie	Phil Spector	Nominated	

=== Golden Globe Awards ===
Year	Category	Nominated work	Result	Ref.
1973	Best Actor in a Motion Picture – Drama	The Godfather	Nominated	
1974	Best Actor in a Motion Picture – Drama	Serpico	Won	
1975	Best Actor in a Motion Picture – Drama	The Godfather Part II	Nominated	
1976	Best Actor in a Motion Picture – Drama	Dog Day Afternoon	Nominated	
1978	Best Actor in a Motion Picture – Drama	Bobby Deerfield	Nominated	
1980	Best Actor in a Motion Picture – Drama	...And Justice for All	Nominated	
1983	Best Actor in a Motion Picture – Musical or Comedy	Author! Author!	Nominated	
1984	Best Actor in a Motion Picture – Drama	Scarface	Nominated	
1990	Best Actor in a Motion Picture – Drama	Sea of Love	Nominated	
1991	Best Supporting Actor – Motion Picture	Dick Tracy	Nominated	
1991	Best Actor in a Motion Picture – Drama	The Godfather Part III	Nominated	
1993	Best Supporting Actor – Motion Picture	Glengarry Glen Ross	Nominated	
1993	Best Actor in a Motion Picture – Drama	Scent of a Woman	Won	
2001	Cecil B. DeMille Award		Recipient	
2004	Best Actor in a Miniseries or Motion Picture – Television	Angels in America	Won	
2011	Best Actor in a Miniseries or Motion Picture – Television	You Don't Know Jack	Won	
2014	Best Actor in a Miniseries or Motion Picture – Television	Phil Spector	Nominated	
2016	Best Actor in a Motion Picture – Musical or Comedy	Danny Collins	Nominated	
2020	Best Supporting Actor – Motion Picture	The Irishman	Nominated	
2021	Best Actor in a Television Series – Drama	Hunters	Nominated	

=== Grammy Awards ===
Year	Category	Nominated work	Result	Ref.
2001	Best Spoken Word Album	The Complete Shakespeare Sonnets	Nominated	

=== Tony Awards ===
Year	Category	Nominated work	Result	Ref.
1969	Best Supporting or Featured Actor in a Play	Does a Tiger Wear a Necktie?	Won	
1977	Best Leading Actor in a Play	The Basic Training of Pavlo Hummel	Won	
2011	Best Leading Actor in a Play	The Merchant of Venice	Nominated	

== Other theatre awards ==
Organizations	Year	Category	Work	Result	Ref.
Drama Desk Awards	1969	Best Performance	Does a Tiger Wear a Necktie?	Won	
Drama Desk Awards	1977	Best Leading Actor in a Play	The Basic Training of Pavlo Hummel	Won	
Drama Desk Awards	1984	Best Leading Actor in a Play	American Buffalo	Nominated	
Drama Desk Awards	2011	Best Leading Actor in a Play	The Merchant of Venice	Nominated	
Obie Awards	1966	Best Actor	Why Is A Crooked Letter	Nominated	
Obie Awards	1968	Best Actor	The Indian Wants the Bronx	Won	
Theatre World Awards	1969	Best Debut	Does a Tiger Wear a Necktie?	Won	

== Critics awards ==
Organizations	Year	Category	Work	Result	Ref.
Boston Society of Film Critics	1997	Best Leading Actor	Donnie Brasco	Won	
Chicago Film Critics Association	1991	Best Leading Actor	Dick Tracy	Nominated	
Chicago Film Critics Association	1993	Best Leading Actor	Scent of a Woman	Nominated	
Chicago Film Critics Association	1993	Best Supporting Actor	Glengarry Glen Ross	Nominated	
Chicago Film Critics Association	1998	Best Leading Actor	Donnie Brasco	Nominated	
Chicago Film Critics Association	2020	Best Supporting Actor	The Irishman	Nominated	
Columbus Film Critics Association	2019	Best Supporting Actor	The Irishman	Nominated	
Kansas City Film Critics Circle	1976	Best Leading Actor	Dog Day Afternoon	Won	
London Film Critics Circle	2003	Best Leading Actor	Insomnia	Nominated	
Los Angeles Film Critics Association	1975	Best Leading Actor	Dog Day Afternoon	Won	
National Board of Review	1972	Best Supporting Actor (Note: Tied with Joel Grey for Cabaret.)	The Godfather	Won	
National Board of Review	1973	Best Leading Actor (Note: Tied with Robert Ryan for The Iceman Cometh.)	Serpico	Won	
National Society of Film Critics	1973	Best Leading Actor	The Godfather	Won	
National Society of Film Critics	1974	Best Leading Actor	Serpico	Nominated	
National Society of Film Critics	1976	Best Leading Actor	Dog Day Afternoon	Nominated	
National Society of Film Critics	1991	Best Supporting Actor	Dick Tracy	Nominated	
National Society of Film Critics	1998	Best Leading Actor	Donnie Brasco	Nominated	
New York Film Critics Circle	1974	Best Leading Actor	Serpico	Nominated	
New York Film Critics Circle	1976	Best Leading Actor	Dog Day Afternoon	Nominated	
New York Film Critics Circle	1993	Best Leading Actor	Scent of a Woman	Nominated	
Television Critics Association	2004	Best Actor in a Drama	Angels in America	Nominated	

== Miscellaneous awards ==
Organizations	Year	Category	Work	Result	Ref.
American Comedy Awards	1991	Best Supporting Actor in a Film	Dick Tracy	Won	
American Movie Awards	1980	Best Leading Actor	...And Justice for All	Nominated	
Blockbuster Entertainment Awards	2000	Favorite Leading Actor in a Drama	Any Given Sunday	Nominated	
Capri Hollywood International Film Festival	2019	Best Ensemble Cast	Once Upon a Time in Hollywood	Won	
David di Donatello Awards	1973	Best Foreign Actor	The Godfather	Won	
David di Donatello Awards	1974	Best Foreign Actor	Serpico	Won	
David di Donatello Awards	1993	Best Foreign Actor	Carlito's Way	Nominated	
Directors Guild Awards	1997	Outstanding Documentary Directorial Achievement	Looking for Richard	Won	
Golden Raspberry Awards	1985	Worst Actor	Revolution	Nominated	
Golden Raspberry Awards	2003	Worst Supporting Actor	Gigli	Nominated	
Golden Raspberry Awards	2008	Worst Actor	88 Minutes | Righteous Kill	Nominated	
Golden Raspberry Awards	2011	Worst Supporting Actor	Jack and Jill	Won	
Hollywood Film Awards	2019	Hollywood Supporting Actor Award	The Irishman	Won	
Independent Spirit Awards	1997	Truer Than Fiction Award	Looking for Richard	Nominated	
Karlovy Vary International Film Festival	1980	Best Actor (Note: Tied with Uelese Petaia for Sons for the Return Home.)	...And Justice for All	Won	
MTV Movie Awards	1998	Best Villain	The Devil's Advocate	Nominated	
San Sebastián International Film Festival	1975	Best Actor	Dog Day Afternoon	Won	
Satellite Awards	2000	Best Leading Actor in a Drama Film	The Insider	Nominated	
Satellite Awards	2004	Best Leading Actor in a Miniseries or Television Film	Angels in America	Nominated	
Satellite Awards	2010	Best Leading Actor in a Miniseries or Television Film	You Don't Know Jack	Won	
Satellite Awards	2014	Best Leading Actor in a Miniseries or Television Film	Phil Spector	Nominated	
Saturn Awards	1991	Best Supporting Actor in a Film	Dick Tracy	Nominated	
Saturn Awards	1998	Best Leading Actor in a Film	The Devil's Advocate	Nominated	
Teen Choice Awards	2007	Choice Movie Villain	Ocean's Thirteen	Nominated	
Valladolid International Film Festival	1992	Best Actor (Note: Shared with the cast of Glengarry Glen Ross, Jack Lemmon, Ed Harris, Alan Arkin, Kevin Spacey, Alec Baldwin, and Jonathan Pryce.)	Glengarry Glen Ross	Won	

== Honorary awards ==
Organizations	Year	Notes	Result	Ref.
Venice Film Festival	1994	Golden Lion for Lifetime Achievement	Honored	
San Sebastián International Film Festival	1996	Donostia Award	Honored	
Gotham Awards	1996	Lifetime Achievement Award	Honored	
Film Society of Lincoln Center	2000	Gala Tribute	Honored	
Golden Globe Awards	2001	Cecil B. DeMille Award	Honored	
American Cinematheque	2005	American Cinematheque Award	Honored	
University Philosophical Society	2006	Honorary Patron of the Society	Honored	
American Film Institute	2007	Lifetime Achievement Award	Honored	
National Medal of Arts	2011	Medal	Honored	
Venice International Film Festival	2011	Glory to the Filmmaker Award	Honored	
Venice International Film Festival	2011	Queer Lion	Honored	
Jameson Dublin International Film Festival	2012	Volta Award	Honored	
Goldene Kamera	2013	Lifetime Achievement Award	Honored	
Kennedy Center Honors	2016	Medal	Honored	
American Icon Awards	2019	Statue	Honored	
Shakespeare's Globe	2026	Sam Wanamaker Award	Honored	
SAG-AFTRA	2027	SAG-AFTRA Life Achievement Award	Honored	

== Special citations ==
This list includes awards, votes, etc. where Al Pacino appears by websites, channels or magazines.

Vote or Rank
Voted the greatest movie star of all time in a Channel 4 poll.
Voted second best actor of all time at FilmFour.com (2004).
Ranked #4 in the Empire "The Top 100 Movie Stars of All Time" list (October 1997).
Premiere ranked him #37 on a list of the Greatest Movie Stars of All Time in their Stars in Our Constellation feature (2005).
Voted 41st Greatest Movie Star of All Time by Entertainment Weekly.
His performance as Michael Corleone in The Godfather Part II is ranked #11 on AFI's 100 Years...100 Heroes & Villains list of villains.
His line "Keep your friends close, but your enemies closer." from The Godfather Part II is ranked #58 on AFI's 100 Years...100 Movie Quotes list.
His performance as Michael Corleone in The Godfather Part II is ranked #20 on the list of 100 Greatest Performances of All Time by Premiere.
His character, Michael Corleone from The Godfather Part II, is ranked #21 on the list of 100 Greatest Movie Characters by Empire.
His line "Say hello to my little friend!" from Scarface is ranked #61 on AFI's 100 Years...100 Movie Quotes list.
His character, Tony Montana from Scarface, is ranked #27 on the list of 100 Greatest Movie Characters by Empire.
His character, Tony Montana from Scarface, is ranked #74 on the list of 100 Greatest Movie Characters of All Time by Premiere.
His line "Attica! Attica!" from Dog Day Afternoon is ranked #86 on AFI's 100 Years...100 Movie Quotes list.
His performance as Sonny Wortzik in Dog Day Afternoon is ranked #4 on the list of 100 Greatest Performances of All Time by Premiere.
His performance as Frank Serpico in Serpico is ranked #40 on AFI's 100 Years...100 Heroes & Villains list of heroes.

== Sources ==
- Awards for Al Pacino at IMDb
- Other Works and stage award of Pacino in IMDb.com
