= Al Pacino on stage and screen =

Catalog of performances by American actor Al Pacino

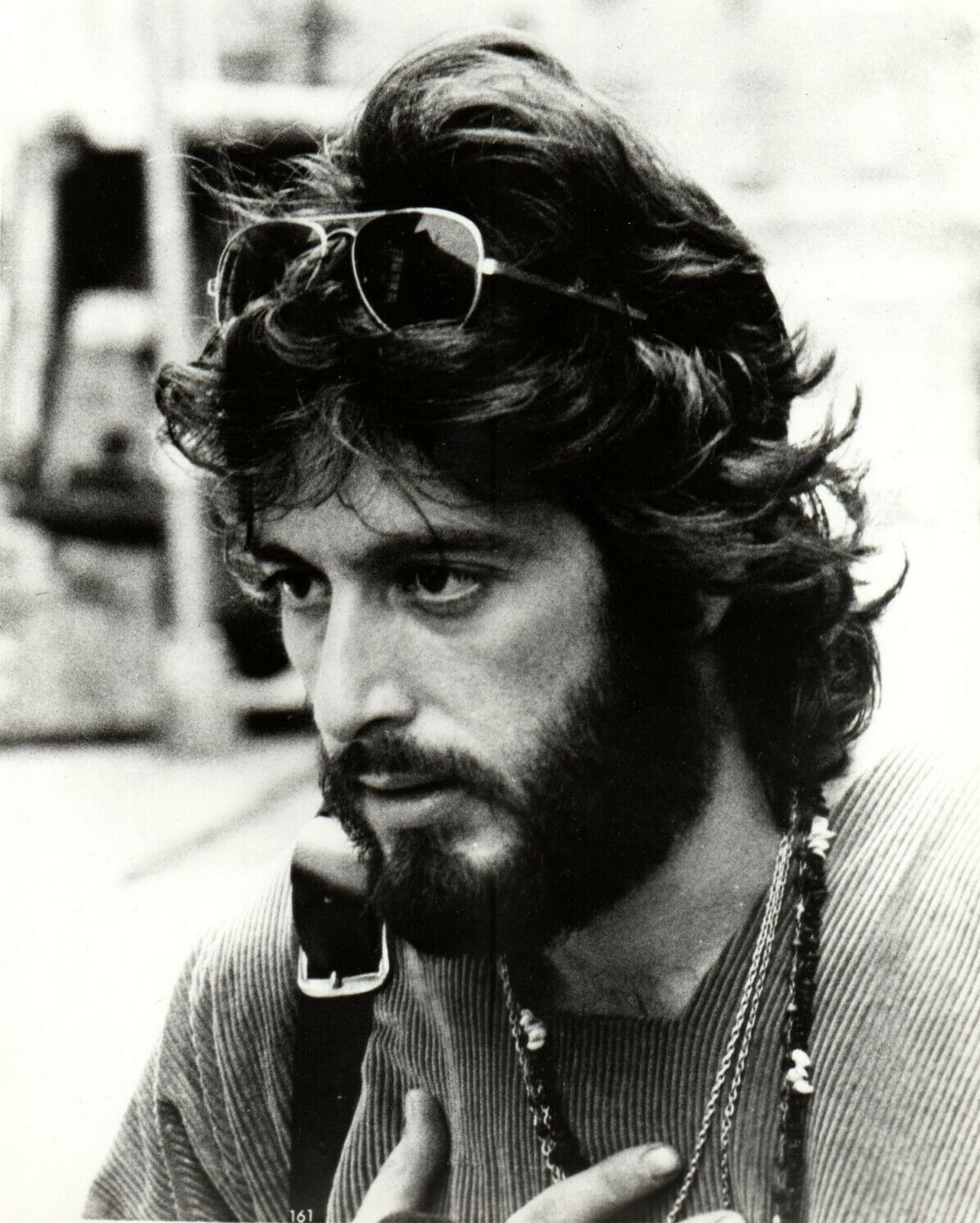
Pacino in Serpico (1973)

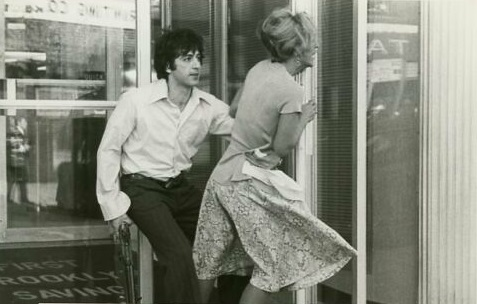
Pacino and Penelope Allen in Dog Day Afternoon (1975)

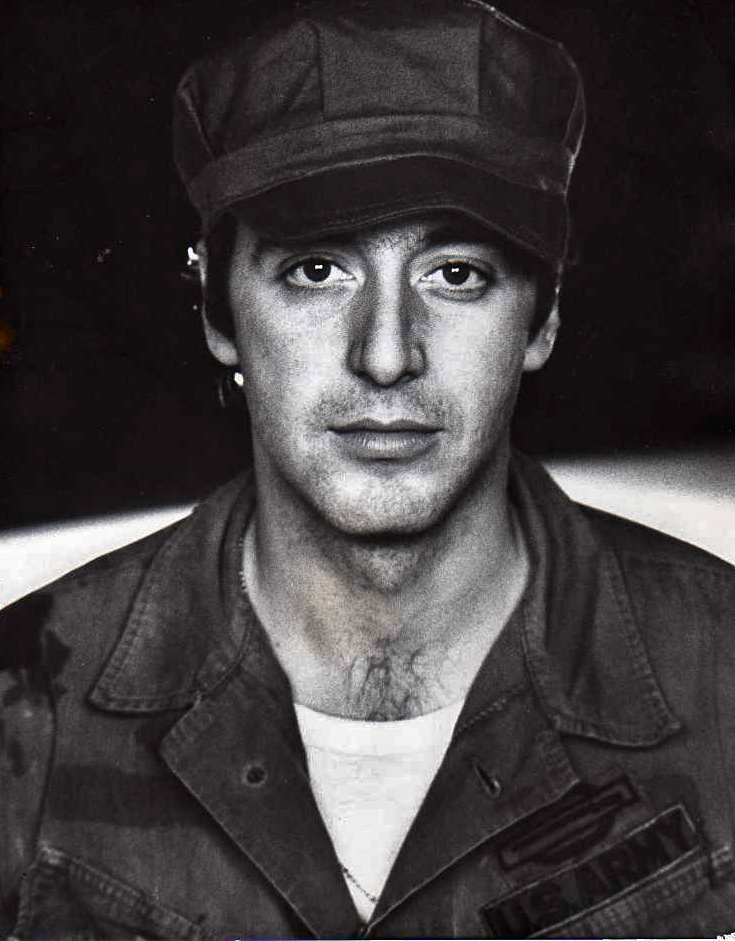
Pacino in The Basic Training of Pavlo Hummel (1977)

Al Pacino is an American screen and stage actor. His film debut was in 1969 with the comedy drama film Me, Natalie. He had his first lead role in the 1971 drama film The Panic in Needle Park. The following year, he played Michael Corleone in the crime film The Godfather (1972), a role he reprised in the sequels The Godfather Part II (1974) and The Godfather Part III (1990). For his performance in the 1973 film Serpico, in which he played Frank Serpico, he won the Golden Globe Award for Best Actor in a Motion Picture Drama. He received Academy Award nominations for Dog Day Afternoon (1975) and ...And Justice for All (1979). In 1983, he starred as Tony Montana in the crime drama film Scarface, a cult classic which is considered to be one of the greatest gangster films.

In the 1990s, Pacino starred in numerous films, including Dick Tracy (1990), Frankie and Johnny with Michelle Pfeiffer (1991), Glengarry Glen Ross (1992; as Richard Roma), Scent of a Woman with Chris O'Donnell (1992), Carlito's Way with Sean Penn (1993), Heat with Robert De Niro (1995), Donnie Brasco with Johnny Depp (1997), The Devil's Advocate with Keanu Reeves (1997), and Any Given Sunday with Cameron Diaz (1999). For his performance in Scent of a Woman, he won the Academy Award for Best Actor and his second Golden Globe Award for Best Actor in a Motion Picture Drama.

Since the early 2000s, he has co-starred in films such as Insomnia opposite Robin Williams (2002), Simone with Catherine Keener (2002), and the thriller film 88 Minutes (2007). In 2007, he was cast as Willie Bank in the heist comedy film Ocean's Thirteen, the third installment in the Ocean's franchise, and the final film in the Ocean's Trilogy. The following year, he appeared in the action thriller film Righteous Kill, again with De Niro. In 2019, he had a minor role in Quentin Tarantino's comedy drama film Once Upon a Time in Hollywood, and he portrayed Jimmy Hoffa in The Irishman, the fourth film on which he and De Niro worked together. In 2021, he portrayed Aldo Gucci in the biographical crime drama film House of Gucci directed by Ridley Scott.

Pacino's television work includes the 2003 HBO miniseries Angels in America, in which he played American lawyer and prosecutor Roy Cohn, and the 2010 made-for-television biopic You Don't Know Jack, in which he played American pathologist and euthanasia proponent Dr. Jack Kevorkian. For both roles, he received the Golden Globe Award for Best Actor – Miniseries or Television Film, making it his third and fourth Golden Globe Award. He also co-starred in the conspiracy drama streaming television series Hunters (2020–2023).

== Film ==
Key
†	Denotes films that have not yet been released

Year	Title	Role	Notes	Ref.
1969	Me, Natalie	Tony		
1971	The Panic in Needle Park	Bobby		
1972	The Godfather	Michael Corleone		
1973	Scarecrow	Francis Lionel "Lion" Delbuchi		
1973	Serpico	NYPD Police Detective Frank Serpico		
1974	The Godfather Part II	Michael Corleone		
1975	Dog Day Afternoon	Sonny Wortzik		
1977	Bobby Deerfield	Bobby Deerfield		
1979	...And Justice for All	Arthur Kirkland		
1980	Cruising	Steve Burns		
1982	Author! Author!	Ivan Travalian		
1983	Scarface	Tony Montana		
1985	Revolution	Tom Dobb		
1989	Sea of Love	NYPD Detective Frank Keller		
1990	The Local Stigmatic	Graham		
1990	Dick Tracy	Alphonse "Big Boy" Caprice		
1990	The Godfather Part III	Michael Corleone		
1991	Frankie and Johnny	Johnny		
1992	Glengarry Glen Ross	Richard "Ricky" Roma		
1992	Scent of a Woman	Frank Slade		
1993	Carlito's Way	Carlito "Charlie" Brigante		
1995	Two Bits	Grandpa		
1995	Heat	LAPD Lieutenant Vincent Hanna		
1996	City Hall	John Pappas		
1997	Donnie Brasco	Benjamin "Lefty" Ruggiero		
1997	The Devil's Advocate	John Milton / Satan		
1999	The Insider	Lowell Bergman		
1999	Any Given Sunday	Tony D'Amato		
2000	Chinese Coffee	Harry Levine	Also director	
2002	Insomnia	Detective Will Dormer		
2002	Simone	Viktor Taransky		
2002	People I Know	Eli Wurman		
2003	The Recruit	Walter Burke		
2003	Gigli	Starkman		
2004	The Merchant of Venice	Shylock		
2005	Two for the Money	Walter Abrams		
2007	88 Minutes	Dr. Jack Gramm		
2007	Ocean's Thirteen	Willie Bank		
2008	Righteous Kill	Det. David "Rooster" Fisk		
2011	The Son of No One	Detective Charles Stanford		
2011	Jack and Jill	Himself		
2012	Stand Up Guys	Val		
2013	Salomé	King Herod	Also director and writer	
2013	We Are Not Animals	The Agent		
2014	Manglehorn	A.J. Manglehorn		
2014	The Humbling	Simon Axler	Also producer	
2015	Danny Collins	Danny Collins		
2016	Misconduct	Abrams		
2017	The Pirates of Somalia	Seymour Tolbin		
2017	Hangman	Detective Ray Archer		
2019	Once Upon a Time in Hollywood	Marvin Schwarz		
2019	The Irishman	Jimmy Hoffa		
2021	American Traitor: The Trial of Axis Sally	James Laughlin		
2021	House of Gucci	Aldo Gucci		
2023	Knox Goes Away	Xavier		
2024	Modì, Three Days on the Wing of Madness	Maurice Gangnat	Also producer	
2025	The Ritual	Father Theophilus Riesinger		
2025	Billy Knight	Billy Knight		
2025	Dead Man's Wire	M.L. Hall		
2025	In the Hand of Dante	Uncle Carmine		
2025	Easy's Waltz	Mickey Albano		
2026	Killing Castro	Robert Maheu		
2026	Father Joe	Giu		
2026	Maserati: The Brothers	Vincenzo Vaccaro	Post-production	
TBA	Lear Rex †	Rey Lear	Post-production	
TBA	Captivated †	TBA	Post-production	

== Documentaries ==
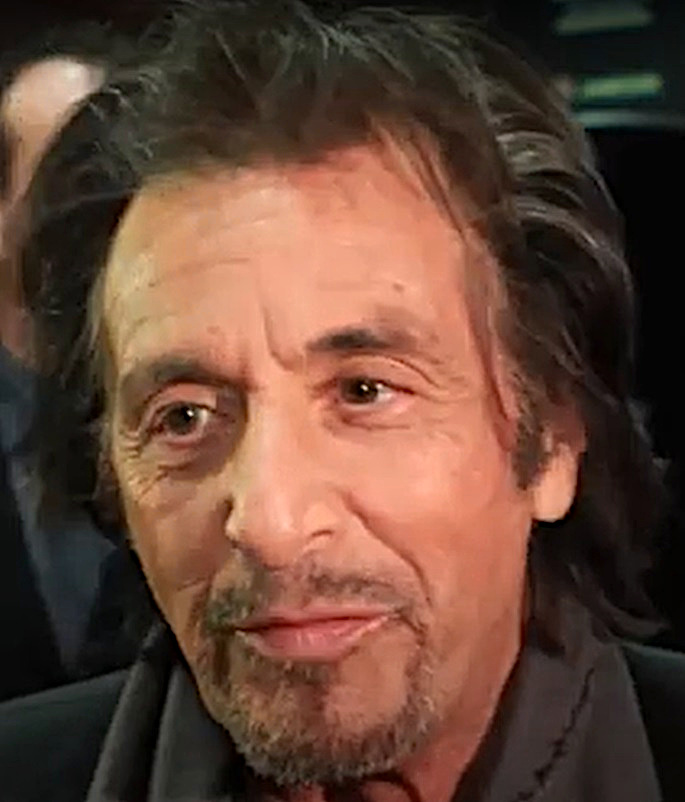
Pacino at JDIFF 2012 for Wilde Salomé

Year	Title	Role	Notes	Ref.
1991	Madonna: Truth or Dare	Himself		
1996	Looking for Richard	Himself / Richard III	Also director, writer and producer	
1997	Pitch	Himself		
2001	America: A Tribute to Heroes	Himself		
2007	Brando	Himself		
2009	I Knew It Was You	Himself		
2011	Wilde Salomé	Himself / King Herod / Oscar Wilde	Also director and writer	
2012	Casting By	Himself		
2017	Julian Schnabel: A Private Portrait	Himself		
2017	Frank Serpico	Himself		

== Television ==
Year	Title	Role	Notes	Ref.
1968	N.Y.P.D.	John James	Episode: "Deadly Circle of Violence"	
2003	Angels in America	Roy Cohn	6 episodes	
2010	You Don't Know Jack	Dr. Jack Kevorkian	Television film	
2013	Phil Spector	Phil Spector	Television film	
2018	Paterno	Joe Paterno	Television film	
2020–2023	Hunters	Meyer Offerman	18 episodes	

== Stage ==
Year	Title	Role	Theater	Notes	Ref(s)
1967	America, Hurrah	2nd Interviewer, Hal	Charles Playhouse, Boston		
1967	Awake and Sing!	Ralph Berger	Charles Playhouse, Boston		
1968	The Indian Wants the Bronx	Murph	Astor Place Theatre, Off-Broadway		
1969	Does a Tiger Wear a Necktie?	Bickham	Belasco Theatre, Broadway		
1969	The Local Stigmatic	Graham	Actors Playhouse, Off-Broadway		
1970	Camino Real	Kilroy	Vivian Beaumont Theatre, Broadway		
1972	The Basic Training of Pavlo Hummel	Pavlo Hummel	Open Circle Theater, Seattle, Washington		
1973	Richard III	Richard, Duke of Gloucester	Loeb Theater, Cambridge, Massachusetts		
1975	The Resistible Rise of Arturo Ui	Arturo Ui	Charles Playhouse, Boston		
1977	The Basic Training of Pavlo Hummel	Pavlo Hummel	Longacre Theatre, Broadway		
1979	Richard III	Richard, Duke of Gloucester	Cort Theatre, Broadway		
1980	American Buffalo	Walter "Teach" Cole	Long Wharf Theatre, New Haven, Connecticut		
1981–1982	American Buffalo	Walter "Teach" Cole	Circle in the Square Downtown, Off-Broadway		
1983–1984	American Buffalo	Walter "Teach" Cole	Booth Theatre, Broadway		
1984	American Buffalo	Walter "Teach" Cole	Duke of York's Theatre, West End		
1988	National Anthems	The Neighbor	Long Wharf Theatre, New Haven, Connecticut		
1988	Julius Caesar	Mark Antony	The Public Theater, Off-Broadway		
1992	Chinese Coffee	Harry Levine	Circle in the Square Theatre, Broadway		
1992	Salome	Herod Antipas	Circle in the Square Theatre, Broadway		
1996	Hughie	Erie Smith	Long Wharf Theatre, New Haven, Connecticut	Also director	
1996	Hughie	Erie Smith	Circle in the Square Theatre, Broadway	Also director	
1999	Hughie	Erie Smith	Mark Taper Forum, Los Angeles	Also director	
2002	The Resistible Rise of Arturo Ui	Arturo Ui	Schimmel Theatre, Off-Broadway		
2003	Salome	Herod Antipas	Ethel Barrymore Theatre, Broadway		
2005	Orphans	Harold	Greenway Court Theatre, Los Angeles		
2006	Salome	Herod Antipas	Wadsworth Theatre, Los Angeles		
2010–2011	The Merchant of Venice	Shylock	Broadhurst Theatre, Broadway		
2012–2013	Glengarry Glen Ross	Sheldon "Shelley" Levene	Gerald Schoenfeld Theatre, Broadway		
2015–2016	China Doll	Mickey Ross	Gerald Schoenfeld Theatre, Broadway		
2017	God Looked Away	Tennessee Williams	Pasadena Playhouse, Los Angeles		

== Audio ==
Year	Title	Role	Production company	Notes
1999	The Complete Shakespeare Sonnets	Reader	Airplay, Inc.	
2024	Sonny Boy: A Memoir	Author/Narrator	Penguin Random House	

== See also ==
- List of awards and nominations received by Al Pacino
