= Don Petersen =

Don Petersen may refer to:

- Don Petersen (playwright) (1927–1998), American playwright
- Donald Petersen (1926–2024), American businessman
