= Al Pacino =

American actor (born 1940)

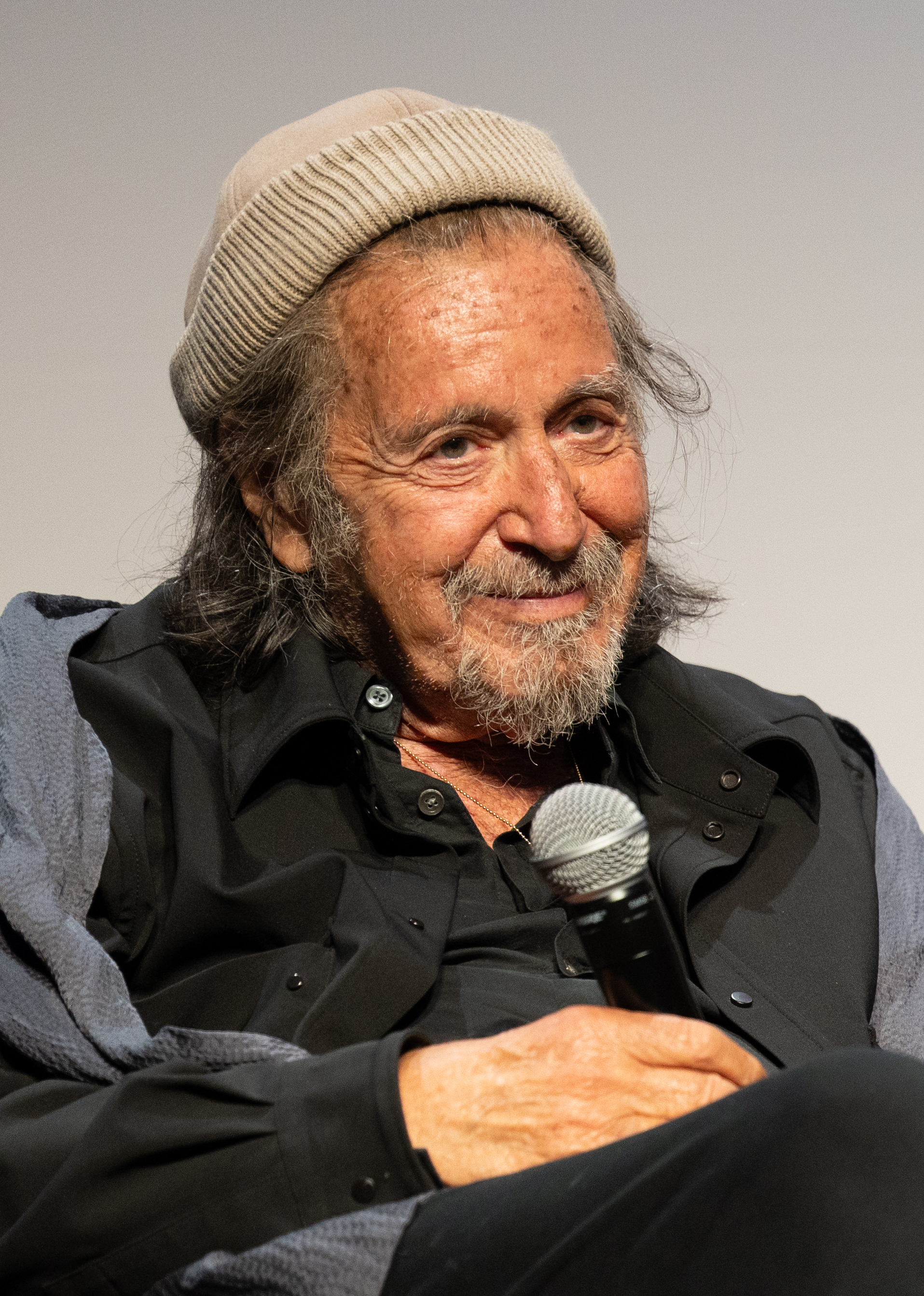
- Pacino in 2026
- Born: Alfredo James Pacino; April 25, 1940 (age 86); New York City, U.S.
- Education: Actors Studio; HB Studio
- Occupation: Actor
- Years active: 1967–present
- Works: Full list
- Partner(s): Lyndall Hobbs (1989–1996); Beverly D'Angelo (1997–2003); Lucila Polak (2008–2018)
- Children: 4, including Julie
- Awards: Full list

Alfredo James Pacino (/pəˈtʃiːnoʊ/ pə-CHEE-noh; Italian: [paˈtʃiːno]; born April 25, 1940) is an American actor. Known for his intense performances on stage and screen, Pacino is widely regarded as one of the greatest actors of all time. His career spans more than six decades, during which he has earned many accolades, achieving the Triple Crown of Acting by winning an Academy Award, two Tony Awards, and two Emmy Awards. He was honored with the Golden Lion for Lifetime Achievement in 1994, the Golden Globe Cecil B. DeMille Award in 2001, the AFI Life Achievement Award in 2007, the National Medal of Arts in 2011, the Kennedy Center Honor in 2016, the Sam Wanamaker Award in 2026 and the SAG-AFTRA Life Achievement Award in 2027. A method actor, Pacino studied at HB Studio and the Actors Studio where he was taught by Charlie Laughton and Lee Strasberg. Films in which he has appeared have grossed over $3 billion worldwide.

Pacino started acting in theater, ranging from underground to off-Broadway and out-of-town productions to Broadway. He won two Tony Awards for Best Featured Actor in a Play for Does a Tiger Wear a Necktie? (1969) and Best Actor in a Play for The Basic Training of Pavlo Hummel (1977). He also played "Teach" in Off-Broadway, Broadway, and West End productions of David Mamet's American Buffalo (1981–1984), starred in multiple productions of Oscar Wilde's Salome (1992, 2003, 2006), and earned a third Tony Award nomination for portraying Shylock in The Merchant of Venice (2010), a role he played in the 2004 feature film adaptation.

After garnering acclaim for his first lead film role in The Panic in Needle Park (1971), Pacino was cast as Michael Corleone in The Godfather (1972), reprising the role in its two sequels (1974, 1990). He was nominated for Academy Awards for the first two films. Pacino would go on to win an Academy Award for Best Actor for his role in Scent of a Woman (1992). His other Oscar-nominated roles were in Serpico (1973), Dog Day Afternoon (1975), ...And Justice for All (1979), Dick Tracy (1990), Glengarry Glen Ross (1992), and The Irishman (2019). Pacino has also starred in Scarecrow (1973), Scarface (1983), Sea of Love (1989), Carlito's Way (1993), Heat (1995), Donnie Brasco, The Devil's Advocate (both 1997), The Insider, Any Given Sunday (both 1999), Insomnia (2002), Ocean's Thirteen (2007), Once Upon a Time in Hollywood (2019), and House of Gucci (2021), among others. On television, Pacino has acted in multiple productions for HBO, including the miniseries Angels in America (2003) and the Jack Kevorkian made-for-television biopic You Don't Know Jack (2010), winning a Primetime Emmy Award for Outstanding Lead Actor in a Miniseries or a Movie for each. Pacino starred in the Amazon Prime Video conspiracy drama thriller series Hunters (2020–2023).

Pacino made his directorial debut with the documentary film Looking for Richard (1996), for which he won a Directors Guild of America Award for Outstanding Directorial Achievement in Documentary. He directed and starred in Chinese Coffee (2000), Wilde Salomé (2011), and Salomé (2013). He wrote his memoir Sonny Boy, which was published by Penguin Press in 2024. Since 1995, Pacino has been co-president of the Actors Studio (he was the co-artistic director from 1981 to 1983).

== Early life and education ==
Alfredo James Pacino was born in the East Harlem neighborhood of Manhattan, New York City, on April 25, 1940, the only child of Sicilian American parents Rose (née Gerardi) and Salvatore Pacino. His paternal grandparents had emigrated from San Fratello, Sicily. His parents divorced when he was two years old. Following the separation, his mother took him to the South Bronx and they lived with his maternal grandparents, Kate and James Gerardi, who had emigrated from Corleone, Sicily when young. Pacino's father moved to California to work as an insurance salesman and restaurateur in Covina, California. From the age of three or four, his mother would take him to the movies and he began to run the characters' lines through his head. "Sonny Boy" was his mother's nickname for Pacino, taken from the popular song by Al Jolson, which she often sang to him.

During his teenage years, Pacino's friends called him "Sonny," "Pacchi," and "Pistachio" (derived from his favorite flavor of ice cream). He had ambitions to become a baseball player and was also nicknamed "The Actor". Pacino began smoking and drinking at age nine and used cannabis casually at age 13, but he abstained from hard drugs. His two closest friends died from drug abuse at the ages of 19 and 30. Growing up in the South Bronx, Pacino got into occasional fights and was considered something of a troublemaker at school. Pacino said that his mother saved his life and kept him off drugs.

He attended Herman Ridder Junior High School, but soon dropped out of most of his classes except for English. Blanche Rothstein, who was his junior high school teacher, saw his acting potential at a young age, casting him in school plays and having him read the Bible passages at their student assemblies. She notably visited their family's tenement apartment to speak with his grandmother that he was "made to do this," which Pacino credited as the turning point in his life. He subsequently attended the High School of Performing Arts, after gaining admission by audition. His mother disagreed with his decision, believing that "poor people don't do acting." After an argument, he left home.

To finance himself and pursue his dreams, Pacino took low-paying jobs as a messenger, busboy, janitor, switchboard operator, usher, and postal clerk, as well as once working in the mailroom for Commentary. He acted in basement plays in New York's theatrical underground. As a teenager, he tried to join the membership organization Actors Studio but was rejected. Instead, Pacino joined HB Studio, where he met acting teacher Charlie Laughton, (Note: Not to be confused with the British actor Charles Laughton.) who became his mentor and best friend. The studio let him go to classes for free, in exchange for cleaning the hallways and dance studios. At night, Pacino would practice Shakespeare soliloquies while wandering the streets. In this period, he was often unemployed or homeless, and sometimes slept on the street, in theaters, or at a friend's home.

In 1962, Pacino's mother died at the age of 43. The following year, his maternal grandfather also died. Pacino recalled it as the lowest point of his life and said, "I was 22 and the two most influential people in my life had gone, so that sent me into a tailspin."

After four years at HB Studio, Pacino successfully auditioned for the Actors Studio. Pacino studied "method acting" under acting coach Lee Strasberg, who later appeared with Pacino in the films The Godfather Part II (1974) and in ...And Justice for All (1979). During later interviews, he spoke about Strasberg and the Studio's effect on his career. "The Actors Studio meant so much to me in my life. Lee Strasberg hasn't been given the credit he deserves ... Next to Charlie, it sort of launched me. It really did. That was a remarkable turning point in my life. It was directly responsible for getting me to quit all those jobs and just stay acting." In another interview, he added, "It was exciting to work for him [Lee Strasberg] because he was so interesting when he talked about a scene or talked about people. One would just want to hear him talk, because things he would say, you'd never heard before ... He had such a great understanding ... he loved actors so much."

== Career ==
=== 1967–1971: Theater roles and film debut ===
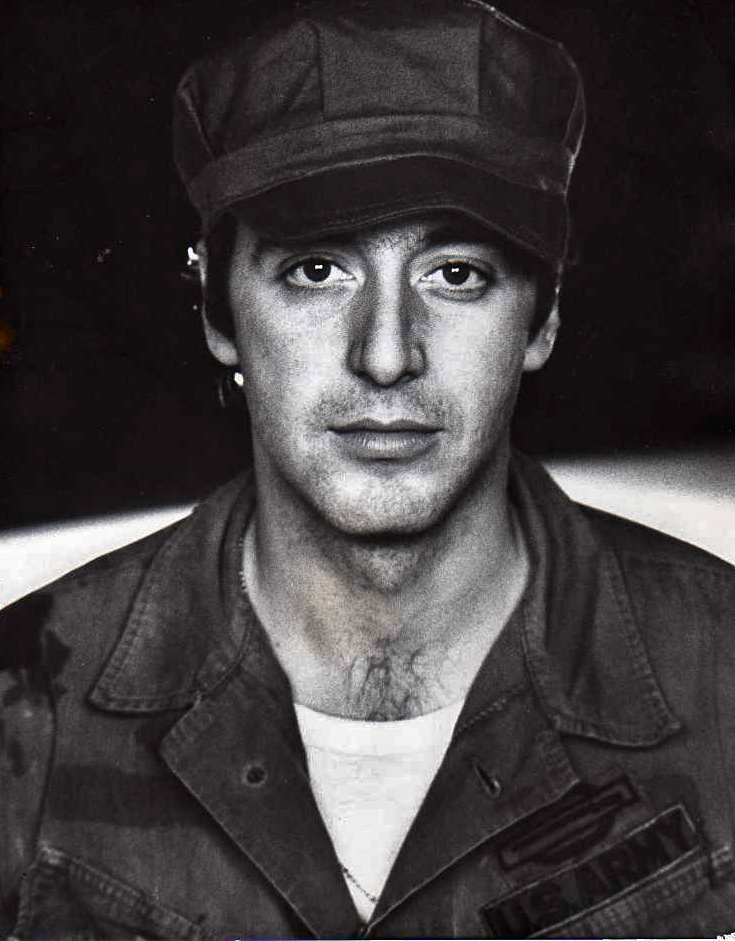
Pacino in the play The Basic Training of Pavlo Hummel in 1977

In 1967, Pacino spent a season at the Charles Playhouse in Boston, performing in Clifford Odets' Awake and Sing! (his first major paycheck: US$125 a week); and in Jean-Claude Van Itallie's America Hurrah. He met actress Jill Clayburgh on this play. They had a five-year romance and moved back to New York City. In 1968, Pacino starred in Israel Horovitz's The Indian Wants the Bronx at the Astor Place Theatre, playing Murph, a street punk. The play opened January 17, 1968, and ran for 177 performances; it was staged in a double bill with Horovitz's It's Called the Sugar Plum, starring Clayburgh. Pacino won an Obie Award for Best Actor for his role, with John Cazale winning for Best Supporting Actor and Horowitz for Best New Play. Martin Bregman saw the play and became Pacino's manager, a partnership that became fruitful in the years to come, as Bregman encouraged Pacino to do The Godfather, Serpico, and Dog Day Afternoon. About his stage career, Pacino said, "Martin Bregman discovered me ... I was 26, 25 ... he discovered me and became my manager. And that's why I'm here. I owe it to Marty, I really do".

Pacino took the production of The Indian Wants the Bronx to Italy for a performance at the Festival dei Due Mondi in Spoleto. It was Pacino's first journey to Italy; he later recalled that "performing for an Italian audience was a marvelous experience". Pacino and Clayburgh were cast in "Deadly Circle of Violence", an episode of the ABC television series NYPD, premiering November 12, 1968. Clayburgh at the time was also appearing on the soap opera Search for Tomorrow, playing the role of Grace Bolton. Her father would send the couple money each month to help with finances.

On February 25, 1969, Pacino made his Broadway debut in Don Petersen's Does a Tiger Wear a Necktie? at the Belasco Theater, produced by A&P heir Huntington Hartford. It closed after 39 performances on March 29, 1969, but Pacino received rave reviews and won the Tony Award on April 20, 1969. Pacino continued performing onstage in the 1970s, winning a second Tony Award for The Basic Training of Pavlo Hummel and performing the title role in Richard III. In the 1980s, Pacino again achieved critical success on stage while appearing in David Mamet's American Buffalo, for which Pacino was nominated for a Drama Desk Award. Since 1990, Pacino's stage work has included revivals of Eugene O'Neill's Hughie, Oscar Wilde's Salome and in 2005 Lyle Kessler's Orphans. Pacino found acting enjoyable and realized he had a gift for it while studying at The Actors Studio. However, his early work was not financially rewarding. After his success on stage, Pacino made his film debut in 1969 with a brief appearance in Me, Natalie, an independent film starring Patty Duke. In 1970, Pacino signed with the talent agency Creative Management Associates (CMA). Pacino made his feature film debut portraying a heroin addict in The Panic in Needle Park (1971).

=== 1972–1983: Stardom and acclaim ===
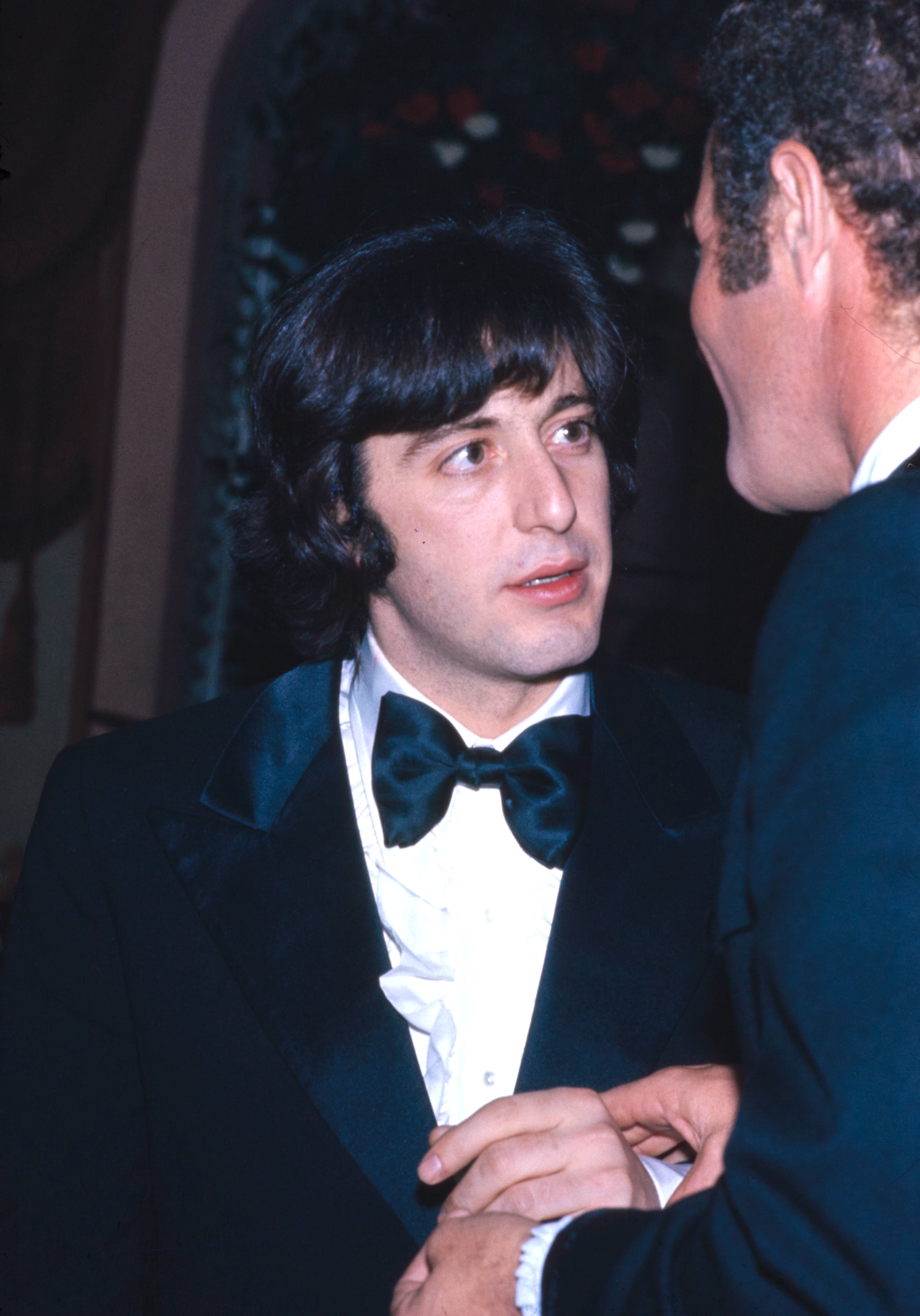
Pacino with James Caan, c. 1972

Francis Ford Coppola cast him as Michael Corleone in what became a blockbuster Mafia film, The Godfather (1972). Although Jack Nicholson, Robert Redford, Warren Beatty, and the little-known Robert De Niro tried out for the part, Coppola selected Pacino, to the dismay of studio executives who wanted someone better known. Pacino's performance earned him an Academy Award nomination, and offered a prime example of his early acting style, described by Halliwell's Film Guide as "intense" and "tightly clenched". The longstanding rumor was that Pacino boycotted the Academy Award ceremony, insulted at being nominated for the Supporting Acting award as he had more screen time than co-star and Best Actor winner Marlon Brando—who also boycotted the awards, but for unrelated reasons. However, in Pacino's memoir released in 2024, he said it was appalling to learn about the rumor now and clarified that he skipped the ceremony due to his struggles with fame. He was terrified, and it overlapped with him working in Boston in the theatre.

In 1973, Pacino co-starred in Scarecrow with Gene Hackman, which won the Palme d'Or at the Cannes Film Festival. That same year, Pacino was nominated for an Academy Award for Best Actor after starring in Serpico, based on the true story of New York City policeman Frank Serpico, who went undercover to expose the corruption of fellow officers. In 1974, Pacino reprised his role as Michael Corleone in The Godfather Part II, which was the first sequel to win the Best Picture Oscar; Pacino was nominated a third time for an Oscar, this second nomination for the Corleone role being in the lead category. Newsweek has described his performance in The Godfather Part II as "arguably cinema's greatest portrayal of the hardening of a heart".

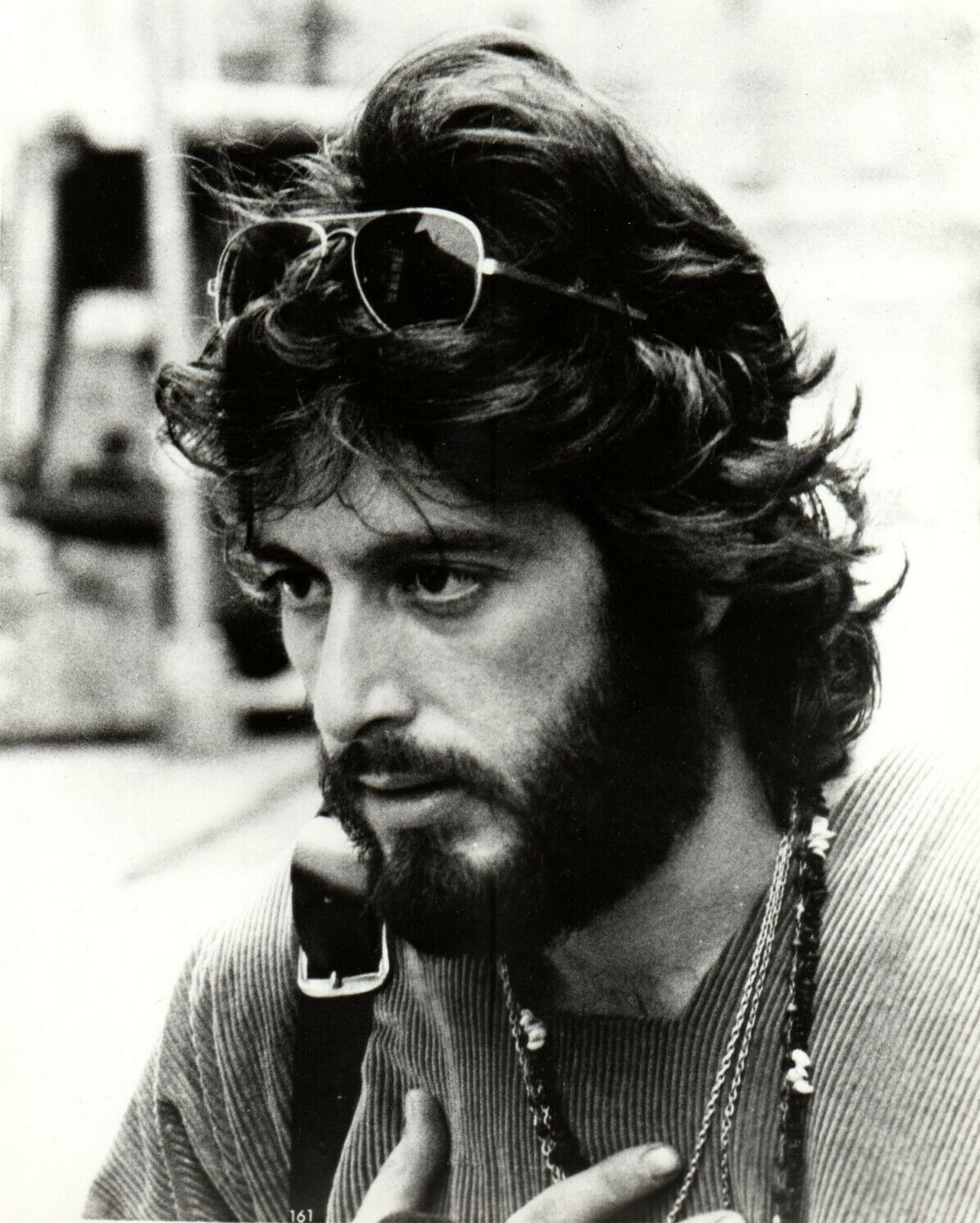
Pacino as Frank Serpico in 1973

In 1975, he enjoyed further success with the release of Dog Day Afternoon, based on the true story of bank robber John Wojtowicz. It was directed by Sidney Lumet, who had directed him in Serpico a few years earlier, and Pacino was again nominated for Best Actor. In 1977, Pacino starred as a race-car driver in Bobby Deerfield, directed by Sydney Pollack, and received a Golden Globe nomination for Best Actor – Motion Picture Drama for his portrayal of the title role. His next film was the courtroom drama ...And Justice for All. Pacino was lauded by critics for his wide range of acting abilities, and nominated for the Best Actor Oscar for a fourth time. He lost out that year to Dustin Hoffman in Kramer vs. Kramer—a role that Pacino had declined. During the 1970s, Pacino had five Oscar nominations, including four for Best Actor for his performances in Serpico, The Godfather Part II, Dog Day Afternoon, and ...And Justice for All.

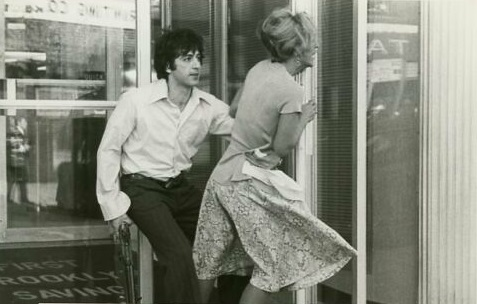
Pacino in Dog Day Afternoon (1975)

Pacino's career slumped in the early 1980s; his appearances in the controversial Cruising, a film that provoked protests from New York's gay community, and the comedy-drama Author! Author!, were critically panned. However, his performance in Scarface (1983), directed by Brian De Palma, proved to be a career highlight and a defining role. Upon its initial release, the film was critically panned due to violent content, but later received critical acclaim. The film performed well at the box office, grossing over US$45 million domestically. Pacino earned a Golden Globe nomination for his role as Cuban drug lord Tony Montana.

In 1983, Pacino became a major donor for The Mirror Theater Ltd, alongside Dustin Hoffman and Paul Newman, matching a grant from Laurance Rockefeller. The men were inspired to invest by their connection with Lee Strasberg, as Strasberg's daughter-in-law Sabra Jones was the founder and Producing Artistic Director of The Mirror.

=== 1984–1988: Setback and hiatus ===
His 1985 film Revolution about a fur trapper during the American Revolutionary War, was a commercial and critical failure, which Pacino blamed on a rushed production, resulting in a four-year hiatus from films. At this time Pacino returned to the stage. He mounted workshop productions of Crystal Clear, National Anthems and other plays; he appeared in Julius Caesar in 1988 in producer Joseph Papp's New York Shakespeare Festival. Pacino remarked on his hiatus from film: "I remember back when everything was happening, '74, '75, doing The Resistible Rise of Arturo Ui on stage and reading that the reason I'd gone back to the stage was that my movie career was waning! That's been the kind of ethos, the way in which theater's perceived, unfortunately."

In 1985, Pacino offered The Mirror Theater Ltd his production of Hughie by Eugene O'Neill, but the company was unable to do it at the time due to the small cast. In 1985, Pacino worked on his personal project, The Local Stigmatic, a 1969 off-Broadway play by the English writer Heathcote Williams. He starred in the play, remounting it with director David Wheeler and the Theater Company of Boston in a 50-minute film version. The film was not released theatrically, but was later released as part of the Pacino: An Actor's Vision box set in 2007.

=== 1989–1999: Resurgence ===
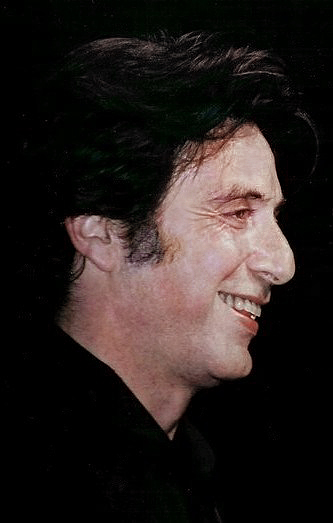
Pacino at the 1996 Cannes Film Festival

Pacino returned to film in 1989's Sea of Love, when he portrayed a detective hunting a serial killer who finds victims through the singles column in a newspaper. The film earned solid reviews. Pacino received an Academy Award nomination for playing Big Boy Caprice in the box office hit Dick Tracy in 1990, of which critic Roger Ebert described Pacino as "the scene-stealer". Later in the year he followed this up in a return to one of his most famous characters, Michael Corleone, in The Godfather Part III (1990).

In 1991, Pacino starred in Frankie and Johnny with Michelle Pfeiffer, who co-starred with Pacino in Scarface. Pacino played a recently paroled cook who begins a relationship with a waitress (Pfeiffer) in the diner where they work. It was adapted by Terrence McNally from his own off-Broadway play Frankie and Johnny in the Clair de Lune (1987), that featured Kenneth Welsh and Kathy Bates. The film received mixed reviews, although Pacino later said he enjoyed playing the part. Janet Maslin in The New York Times wrote, "Mr. Pacino has not been this uncomplicatedly appealing since his Dog Day Afternoon days, and he makes Johnny's endless enterprise in wooing Frankie a delight. His scenes alone with Ms. Pfeiffer have a precision and honesty that keep the film's maudlin aspects at bay." For his portrayal of the irascible, blind U.S. Army Lieutenant Colonel Frank Slade in Martin Brest's Scent of a Woman (1992) Pacino won the Academy Award for Best Actor next year. He was also nominated for Best Supporting Actor for Glengarry Glen Ross, making Pacino the first male actor ever to receive two acting nominations for two movies in the same year, and to win for the lead role.

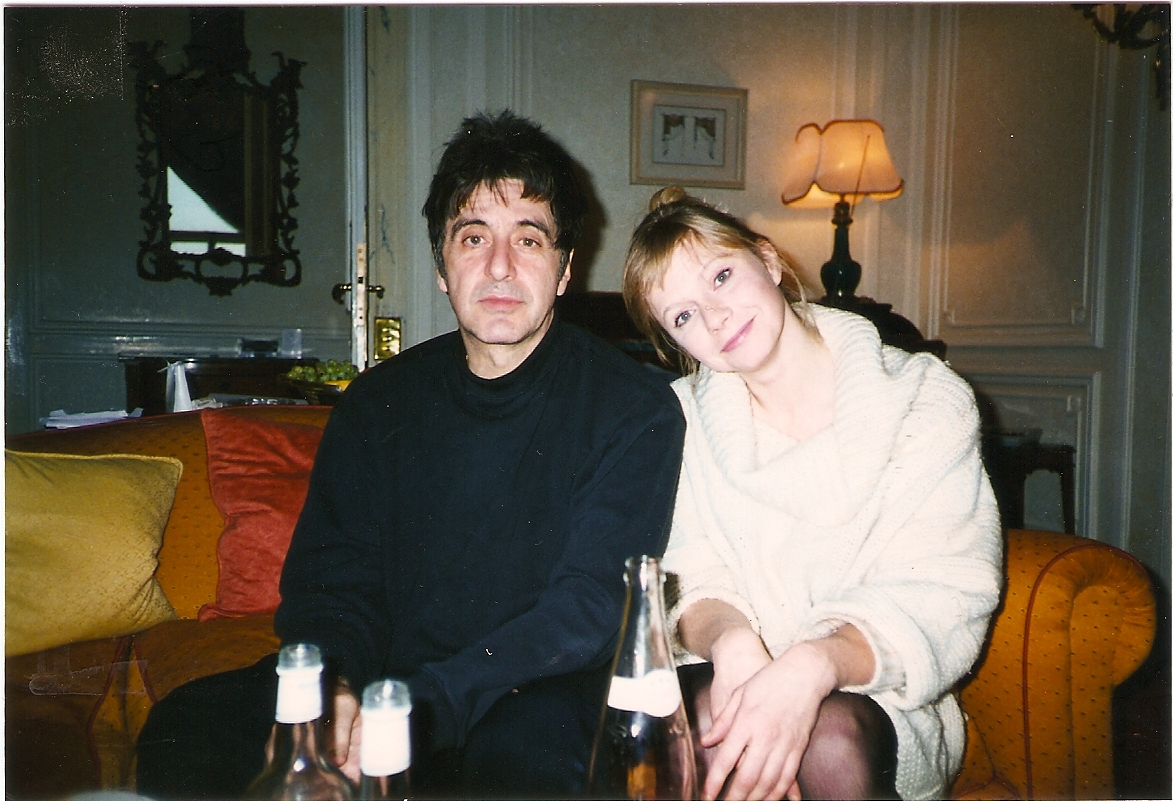
Pacino with Felicity Dean in 1999

Pacino starred alongside Sean Penn in the crime drama Carlito's Way in 1993, in which he played Carlito Brigante, a gangster released from prison with the help of his corrupt lawyer (Penn) and vows to go straight. Pacino starred in Michael Mann's Heat (1995), in which he and Robert De Niro appeared on-screen together for the first time (though both Pacino and De Niro starred in The Godfather Part II, they did not share any scenes). In 1996, Pacino starred in his theatrical docudrama Looking for Richard, a performance of selected scenes of William Shakespeare's Richard III and a broader examination of Shakespeare's continuing role and relevance in popular culture. The cast brought together for the performance included Alec Baldwin, Kevin Spacey, and Winona Ryder.

Pacino played Satan in the supernatural thriller The Devil's Advocate (1997) which co-starred Keanu Reeves. The film was a success at the box office, taking US$150 million worldwide. Roger Ebert wrote in the Chicago Sun-Times, "The satanic character is played by Pacino with relish bordering on glee." In 1997's Donnie Brasco, Pacino played gangster "Lefty" in the true story of undercover FBI agent Donnie Brasco (Johnny Depp) and his work in bringing down the Mafia from the inside. In 1999, Pacino starred as 60 Minutes producer Lowell Bergman in the multi-Oscar nominated The Insider opposite Russell Crowe, and in Oliver Stone's Any Given Sunday.

=== 2000–2018: Television roles and return to Broadway ===
Pacino won three Golden Globes since 2000; the first being the Cecil B. DeMille Award in 2001 for lifetime achievement in motion pictures. In 2000, Pacino starred alongside Jerry Orbach in a low-budget film adaptation of Ira Lewis' play Chinese Coffee, which was released to film festivals. Shot almost exclusively as a one-on-one conversation between two main characters, the project took nearly three years to complete and was funded entirely by Pacino. Chinese Coffee was included with Pacino's two other rare films he was involved in producing, The Local Stigmatic and Looking for Richard, on a special DVD box set titled Pacino: An Actor's Vision, which was released in 2007. Pacino produced prologues and epilogues for the discs containing the films.

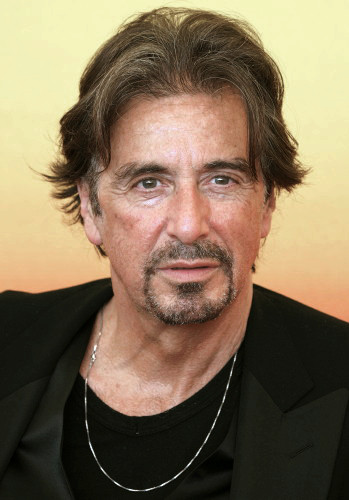
Pacino at the 2004 Venice Film Festival

In October 2002, Pacino starred in Bertolt Brecht's The Resistible Rise of Arturo Ui for the National Actor's Theater and Complicité. Directed by Simon McBurney, the production starred a host of Hollywood names, including John Goodman, Charles Durning, Tony Randall, Steve Buscemi, Chazz Palminteri, Paul Giamatti, Jacqueline McKenzie, Billy Crudup, Lothaire Bluteau, Dominic Chianese, and Sterling K. Brown. The production was a critical success in which "Pacino grabs and holds the attention like a coiled spring about to snap. He is all brooding menace and crocodile grimace, butchering his way to the top with unnervingly sinister glee." Director Christopher Nolan worked with Pacino on Insomnia, a remake of the Norwegian film of the same name, co-starring Robin Williams. Newsweek stated that "he [Pacino] can play small as rivetingly as he can play big, that he can implode as well as explode". The film and Pacino's performance were well received, gaining a favorable rating of 93 percent on the review aggregation website Rotten Tomatoes. The film did moderately well at the box office, taking in $113 million worldwide. His next film, S1m0ne, however, did not receive much critical praise or box office success. He played a publicist in People I Know (2002), a small film that received little attention despite Pacino's well-received performance.

Rarely taking a supporting role since his commercial breakthrough, he accepted a small part in the critical and box office flop Gigli, in 2003, as a favor to director Martin Brest. The Recruit, released in 2003, featured Pacino as a CIA recruiter and co-stars Colin Farrell. The film received mixed reviews, and has been described by Pacino as something he "personally couldn't follow". Pacino next starred as lawyer Roy Cohn in the 2003 HBO miniseries Angels in America, an adaptation of Tony Kushner's Pulitzer Prize winning play of the same name. For this performance, Pacino won his third Golden Globe, for Best Performance by an Actor, in 2004.

Pacino starred as Shylock in Michael Radford's 2004 film adaptation of The Merchant of Venice. Critics praised him for bringing compassion and depth to a character traditionally played as a villainous caricature. In Two for the Money, Pacino portrays a sports gambling agent and mentor for Matthew McConaughey, alongside Rene Russo. The film was released on October 8, 2005, to mixed reviews. Desson Thomson wrote in The Washington Post, "Al Pacino has played the mentor so many times, he ought to get a kingmaker's award ... the fight between good and evil feels fixed in favor of Hollywood redemption." Pacino turned down an offer to reprise his role as Michael Corleone in the video game version of The Godfather (2006). As a result, Electronic Arts was not permitted to use Pacino's likeness or voice in the game, although his character does appear in it. He did allow his likeness to appear in the video game adaptation of 1983's Scarface, the quasi-sequel Scarface: The World is Yours. On October 20, 2006, the American Film Institute named Pacino the recipient of the 35th AFI Life Achievement Award. On November 22, 2006, the University Philosophical Society of Trinity College Dublin awarded Pacino the Honorary Patronage of the Society.

Pacino starred in Steven Soderbergh's Ocean's Thirteen (2007), alongside George Clooney, Brad Pitt, Matt Damon, Elliott Gould, and Andy García, as the villain Willy Bank, a casino tycoon targeted by Danny Ocean and his crew. The film received generally favorable reviews. 88 Minutes was released on April 18, 2008, in the United States, after having been released in various other countries in 2007. The film co-starred Alicia Witt and was critically panned, although critics found fault with the plot, and not Pacino's acting. In Righteous Kill, Pacino and Robert De Niro co-star as New York detectives searching for a serial killer. The film was released to theaters on September 12, 2008. While it was an anticipated return for the two stars, it was not well received by critics.

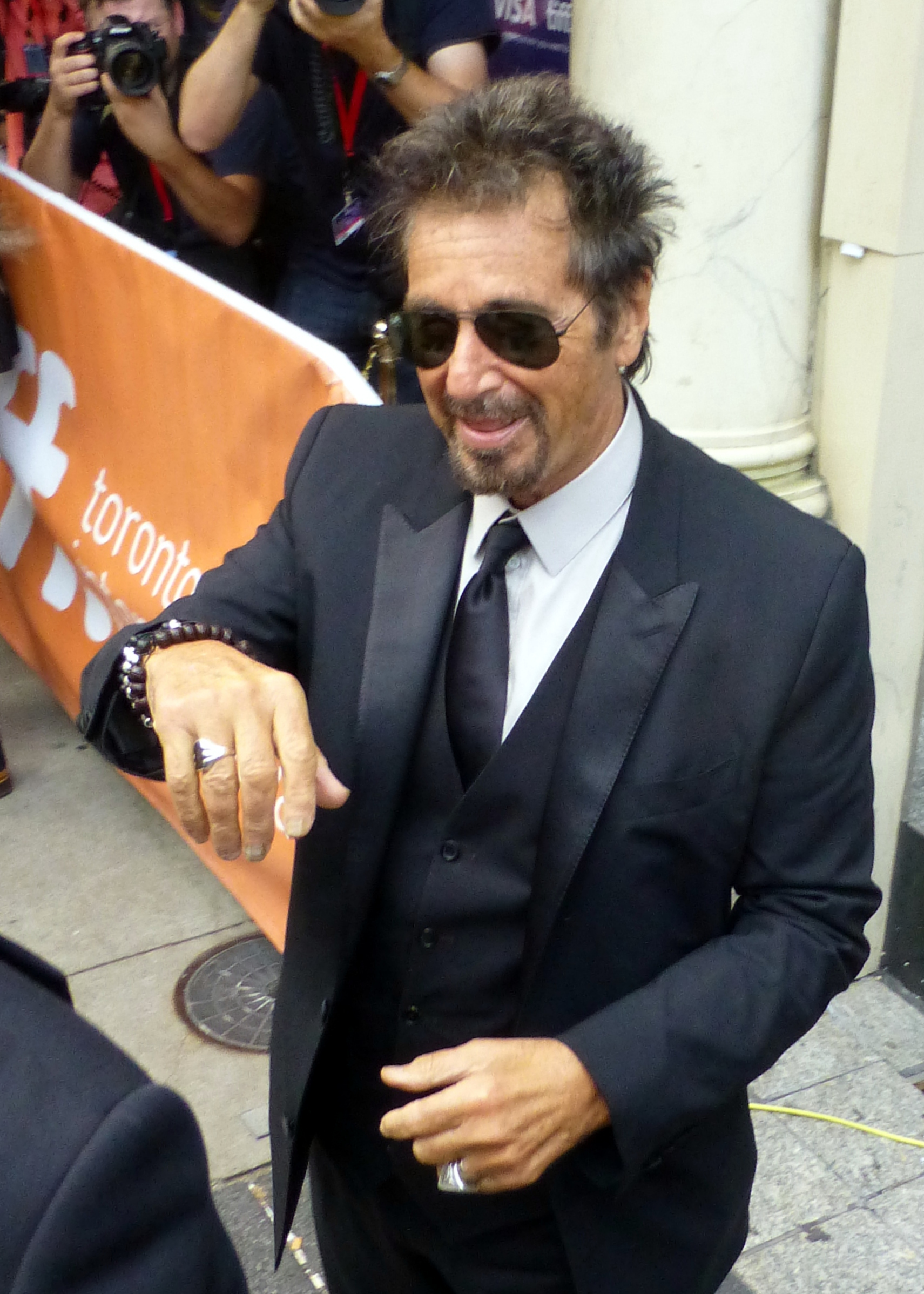
Pacino at the 2014 Toronto International Film Festival

Pacino returned to the stage in the summer of 2010, playing Shylock in the Shakespeare in the Park production, The Merchant of Venice. The acclaimed production moved to Broadway at the Broadhurst Theatre in October, earning US$1 million at the box office in its first week. The performance also garnered him a Tony Award nomination for Best Leading Actor in a Play. Pacino played Jack Kevorkian in an HBO Films biopic titled You Don't Know Jack, which premiered April 2010. The film is about the life and work of the physician-assisted suicide advocate. The performance earned Pacino his second Emmy Award for lead actor and his fourth Golden Globe award. He co-starred as himself in the 2011 comedy film Jack and Jill. The film was panned by critics, and Pacino "won" the Golden Raspberry Award for Worst Supporting Actor at the 32nd ceremony. Elaborating on his decision to join the cast of the film, he stated: "It came at a time in my life that I needed it, because it was after I found out I had no more money. My accountant [Kenneth I. Starr] was in prison, and I needed something quickly. So I took Jack and Jill."

He was presented with Jaeger-LeCoultre Glory to the Filmmaker Award on September 4, 2011, prior to the premiere of Wilde Salomé, a 2011 American documentary-drama film written, directed by and starring Pacino. Its US premiere on the evening of March 21, 2012, before a full house at the 1,400-seat Castro Theatre in San Francisco's Castro District, marked the 130th anniversary of Oscar Wilde's visit to San Francisco. The event was a benefit for the GLBT Historical Society. Pacino, who plays the role of Herod in the film, describes it as his "most personal project ever". In February 2012, President Barack Obama awarded Pacino the National Medal of Arts. In September 2012, Deadline Hollywood reported that Pacino would play the former Penn State University football coach Joe Paterno in the television film Paterno based on a 2012 biography by sportswriter Joe Posnanski. Paterno premiered on HBO on April 7, 2018. Pacino starred in the 30th-anniversary Broadway revival of David Mamet's play, Glengarry Glen Ross, which ran from October 2012 to January 20, 2013. He also starred in a 2013 HBO biographical picture about record producer Phil Spector's murder trial, titled Phil Spector.

In 2015, Pacino took the title role in the comedy-drama Danny Collins. His performance as an aging rock star garnered him a Golden Globe Award for Best Actor – Motion Picture Musical or Comedy nomination. He starred on Broadway in China Doll, a play written for him by Mamet, which opened on December 5, 2015, and closed on January 21, 2016, after 97 performances. The previews were done in October 2015.

In 2016, Pacino received the Kennedy Center Honor. The tribute included remarks by his former costars Sean Penn, Kevin Spacey, Bobby Cannavale and Chris O'Donnell. Speaking about the possibility of retiring, Pacino said: "Acting, especially if you've done it as long as I have, it becomes such a part of your nature you rarely ever think about quitting or anything like that."

=== 2019–present: Late career ===
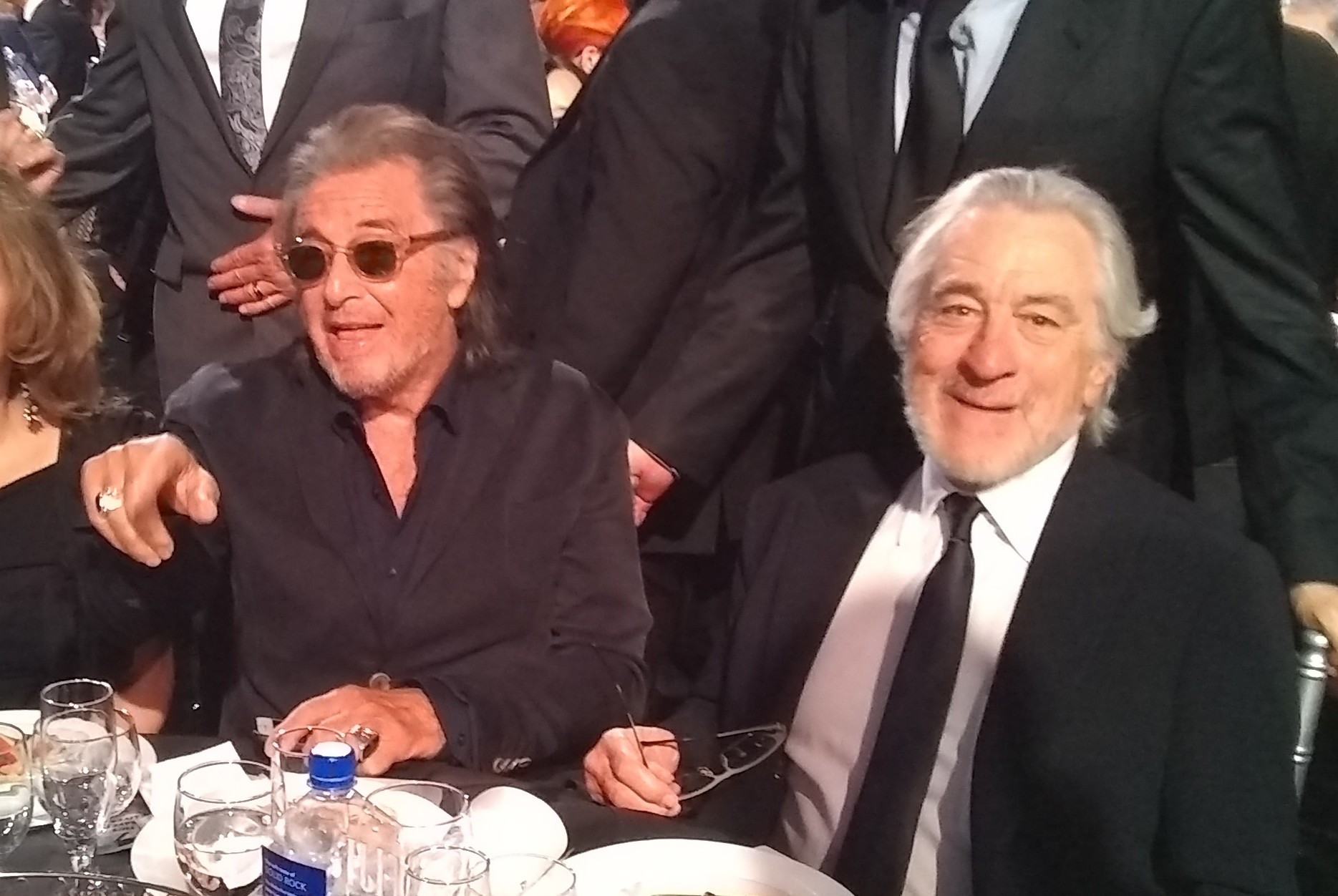
Pacino (left) and Robert De Niro during the 25th Critics' Choice Awards in January 2020

Pacino starred alongside Brad Pitt and Leonardo DiCaprio in Quentin Tarantino's comedy-drama Once Upon a Time in Hollywood, which was released on July 26, 2019. Later in 2019, Pacino played Teamsters chief Jimmy Hoffa, alongside Robert De Niro and Joe Pesci, in Martin Scorsese's Netflix film The Irishman, based on the 2004 book I Heard You Paint Houses by Charles Brandt. This was the first time Pacino was directed by Scorsese, and he received a Best Supporting Actor nomination at the 92nd Academy Awards—his ninth to date. Pacino's performance received positive reviews. Peter Bradshaw described it as "glorious" in The Guardian. Justin Chang wrote, "De Niro, Pesci and Pacino are at the top of their game, in part because they aren't simply rehashing the iconic gangster types they've played before."

In February 2020, Pacino starred as Meyer Offerman, a fictional Nazi hunter, in the Amazon Prime Video series Hunters. This is Pacino's first television series since Angels in America (2003). Hunters was renewed for a second season in August 2020. In 2021, Pacino played Aldo Gucci in Ridley Scott's House of Gucci. The film received mixed to positive reviews, with Pacino's performance being highlighted as a standout, along with Lady Gaga's and Jared Leto's. That same year, he played the lead defense attorney in American Traitor: The Trial of Axis Sally.

In 2023, Pacino returned to the screen in a supporting role by playing a thief and fixer Xavier Crane in Michael Keaton's Knox Goes Away, a noir thriller that follows a contract killer diagnosed with a fast-moving form of dementia, which premiered at the 48th Toronto International Film Festival.

In 2024, Pacino starred in Modì, Three Days on the Wing of Madness, a film about Amedeo Modigliani, which he co-produced alongside Johnny Depp and Barry Navidi. The film is based on a play by Dennis McIntyre, which was previously adapted for the 2004 film of the same name. Principal photography commenced in September 2023. On March 10, 2024, Pacino presented the Academy Award for Best Picture at the 96th Academy Awards, the third time he presented the Academy Award for Best Picture (first in 1995 with Robert de Niro and second in 1997). On October 15, 2024, Pacino released his bestselling memoir titled Sonny Boy with Penguin Press that covers his life from a challenging childhood in the South Bronx to becoming an iconic actor.

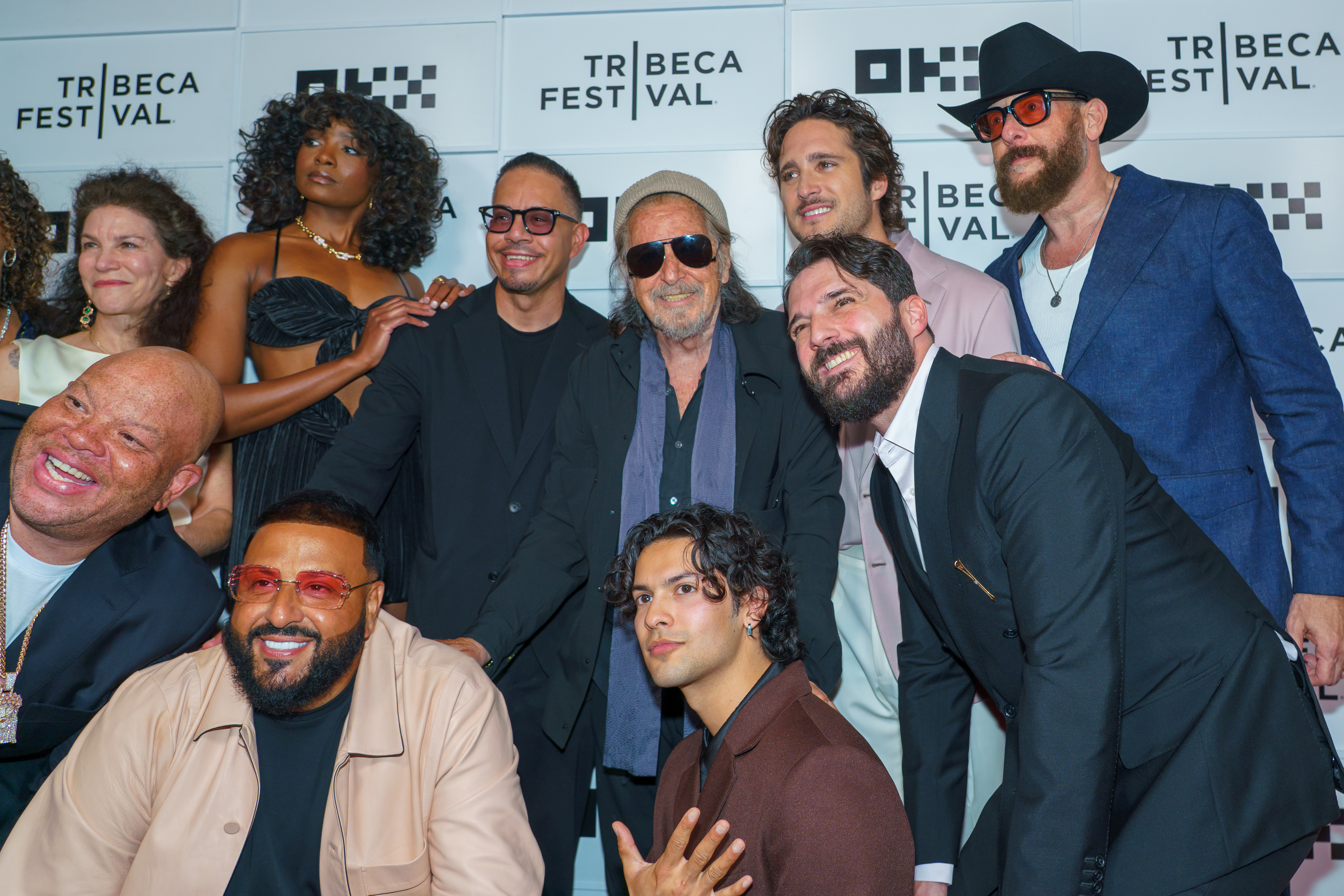
Cast of "Killing Castro" Tribeca Film Festival

Pacino appeared in five independent films in 2025. The first was the horror film The Ritual, in which he played priest Theophilus Riesinger with Dan Stevens. The film received negative reviews from critics. The second was Billy Knight, a coming-of-age drama that follows aspiring filmmakers' journey between youthful ambition and artistic expression co-starring Charlie Heaton and Diana Silvers. It made its premiere at the Rhode Island International Film Festival 2025 and was acquired by Mise-En-Scène Company for worldwide sales. In September 2025, he played minor roles in two films: Dead Man's Wire and In the Hand of Dante, both of which made their world premiere out of competition at the 82nd Venice International Film Festival. The first film acquired by Row K Entertainment featured him as a wealthy mortgage broker, described by co-star Cary Elwes as an intentional, "Easter egg," and a "full-circle moment" referencing his iconic performance in Dog Day Afternoon. His brief cameo in the second film, acquired by Netflix, was praised by Caryn James of The Hollywood Reporter as "among the film's sharpest and best." Pacino's last 2025 film participation was Nic Pizzolatto's Easy's Waltz opposite Vince Vaughn, which premiered at the Toronto International Film Festival as a Special Presentation. In the same year, Pacino became the first movie star to meet with Pope Leo XIV.

In 2026, Pacino's locker room monologue from Any Given Sunday was used in a national campaign for Pfizer. In June 2026, he starred as CIA Agent Robert Maheu in the film Killing Castro, which premiered at the Tribeca Festival. In the same month, Shakespeare's Globe named Pacino as the 2026 recipient of the Sam Wanamaker Award, recognizing his contribution to theatre and film, particularly his performances in Shakespeare's works.

== Other ventures ==
=== Speaking engagements ===
Pacino made several appearances as a guest and keynote speaker at universities and film schools, often sharing his acting expertise and reflections on his career. On November 19, 1999, he visited Yale University to conduct a master class for the Yale Dramatic Association, attend a question-and-answer session following screenings of his films, The Insider and Looking for Richard, and receive an award in recognition of his contribution to acting. On November 22, 2006, he visited Trinity College Dublin to accept the honorary patronage of the University Philosophical Society for his contribution to theatre and for bringing the work of Oscar Wilde to Broadway audiences. He gave a speech, including a dramatic monologue, followed by a Q&A session with students.

On October 16, 2010, he was the distinguished speaker at the Rochester Institute of Technology's Brick City Homecoming and Family Weekend to a sold-out crowd of 4,800. On December 4, 2014, he appeared as the guest speaker to share stories and experience with the New York Film Academy students after a special advanced screening of his film, The Humbling and participated in a Q&A with them.

=== Philanthropy ===
Pacino has participated in several benefit productions and staged readings to raise funds for theater companies and arts programs. In 1992, he appeared in the double-bill of Salome and Chinese Coffee, which served as a $50-a-show fundraiser for the Circle in the Square Theatre to reduce its debt and was a successful run. In 1996, he continued his support for the theater by directing and starring in the revival of Eugene O'Neill's Hughie production. In 2019, he joined Geoffrey Rush for Simply Shakespeare: The Merchant of Venice, a one-night-only staged benefit reading to support the Shakespeare Center of Los Angeles. In 2020, he participated in the same activity for David Rabe's The Basic Training of Pavlo Hummel at the Wallis Annenberg Center for the Performing Arts. Proceeds from the reading supported the National Association of Veteran-Serving Organizations and the SCLA's Veterans in Art program. In 2022, he did a one-night-only fundraiser, Al Pacino Live on Stage, featuring a career retrospective and Q&A session, to support SCLA.

Pacino has also appeared in public service announcements and campaigns supporting social causes and charitable initiatives. In 2001, alongside other actors, he volunteered in the America: A Tribute to Heroes charity telethon to take telephone pledges from the public during the live broadcast to raise funds for the victims and families impacted by the September 11 attacks. In 2005, he was involved with the ONE Campaign, which focuses on fighting extreme poverty, hunger, and AIDS, through their Make Poverty History television and print campaigns with other personalities. In 2012, he joined public figures in appealing for financial support for Hurricane Sandy relief in a PSA. In 2023, Pacino agreed with the Halftime campaign, releasing a new version of the famous 'inch by inch' locker room speech delivered by him from the film Any Given Sunday, which highlighted the importance of the United Nations' Sustainable Development Goals reaching the halfway mark.

In 2009, Pacino received the "Jane Wyman Humanitarian Award," the highest honor given by the Southern California Chapter of the Arthritis Foundation for his history of charitable giving and lifelong contributions and support to the foundation's mission to find a cure. Pacino, who has supported many causes anonymously, spoke of its importance in a rare interview with CBS News: "I don't think people are aware of how it strikes children and how it manifests," adding that if speaking out can help those with arthritis, then it's worth it.

In 2024, Pacino revealed in his memoir Sonny Boy that he felt that the 1980 film Cruising was "exploitative" of the LGBTQ+ community after seeing the finished product. He did not promote the film, and he anonymously donated the money he earned from it to an irrevocable trust fund for charitable purposes.

=== Production company ===
Pacino was the owner of Chal Productions, a production shingle for theater and film based in New York, co-founded with his friend and mentor Charlie Laughton. Founded roughly two decades prior to 2001, it operates as a flexible development company adjusting its focus based on Pacino's work. Its following credits included Looking for Richard, Chinese Coffee, People I Know, and Wilde Salomé.

== Reception and legacy ==
Al Pacino is widely regarded as one of the greatest and most influential actors in the history of cinema and theatre. Known for his "signature intensity," "tightly clenched," and "explosive" performances, he emerged as a defining titan of the New Hollywood era. The Globe and Mail identified him as the quintessential "icon for the early 1970s counterculture generation," while Newsweek highlighted his "haggard, life-wrestling beauty and a street eloquence" that set him apart from his contemporaries. Film critics have frequently noted how his rise reshaped the traditional ideal of American masculinity. The Atlantic observed that his appearance and introverted demeanor broke the mold of the historically dominant Anglo-Saxon Protestant leading man. Film scholar Karina Longworth said that his status as an unconventional sex symbol in the 1970s fundamentally transformed American popular culture.

Central to Pacino's artistic identity is his deep-seated devotion to the stage. Both Ron Rosenbaum and Oliver Stone have described him as the "Hamlet of Hollywood" for his ability to bring "Shakespearean depths of tragic grandeur" to his roles. Grounded in Lee Strasberg's method acting, Pacino's craft relies on intuition and intense internal excavation. Strasberg once remarked, "Some actors play characters. Al Pacino becomes them. He assumes their identity so completely that he continues to live a role long after a play or movie is over." Collaborators have pointed to this instinctive talent; Sydney Pollack noted that once Pacino locks onto a character, "it's like a dog picking up a scent," while Michael Mann compared his deliberative preparation to Pablo Picasso "staring at an empty canvas for many hours in intense concentration." Playwright David Mamet likened Pacino's off-script improvisations to jazz legend Louis Armstrong, noting that the actor is "incapable of doing it the same way twice." For his part, Pacino views his technique as "an extension of [his] emotional state." Chicago Reader commended this approach, characterizing him as an "outsize method actor who's never afraid to embarrass himself in the pursuit of spontaneous expression."

Critics and directors alike have long analyzed Pacino's screen presence, which Encyclopædia Britannica defined by his "brooding seriousness and explosive rage." Smithsonian attributed his early popularity to playing troubled figures "on the edge of crazy, or going over it," while Georgia Dullea of The New York Times observed that he prioritized raw authenticity over likeability to make complex human beings understandable. Variety likewise observed that while contemporaries like Jack Nicholson played cool anti-heroes, Pacino specialized in "doomed ethnic outsiders (often immigrants), emotionally explosive men who carry themselves with blustery bravado despite defeating surroundings." Directors who worked closely with him highlighted this intense internal energy, with Sidney Lumet describing an "incredible core inside of him [...] like getting somewhere near the center of the earth," while Francis Ford Coppola emphasized his intelligence and mastery over his gifts, pointing to "this striking magnetic quality, this smoldering ambiance." Marcia Lucas, who edited his early screen tests, recalled that Pacino "undresses you with his eyes," a gaze film critic Tom Shone of Prospect expanded on, noting that while the visceral power of a Pacino performance often stems from his voice, "the subtlety is often to be found in his eyes," allowing the audience to witness fleeting moments of panic or premeditation across his face, adding that "he has the peripheral vision of a deer."

Life's on the wire, man. That's my acting, my life. When I work, I'm on the wire. When I'm going for it. When I'm taking chances. I want to take chances. I want to fly and fail. I want to bang into something when I do it, because it's how I know I'm alive. It's what's kept me alive.

— Pacino on acting emanated from The Flying Wallendas's quote, "Life is on the wire. The rest is just waiting."

Despite his commanding screen persona, Pacino is reclusive in his personal life. Described by The New York Times as "Hollywood's legendary shy guy," his longtime advisor Charlie Laughton nicknamed him "the wild square" due to the sharp contrast between his bohemian public image and his quiet, traditional private life. Those who know him off-camera consistently describe him as gentle, compassionate, and "sort of the opposite of his characters." The Daily Telegraph stated that he has a way of "making you forget, very quickly, that he's Al Pacino," remaining "low-key, easygoing and incongruously humble." Pacino has historically avoided the Hollywood spotlight, opting for long periods without a press agent, refraining from commercial endorsements in the United States, and abstaining from political commentary. One of his biographers, Lawrence Grobel, commented that Pacino's rare interviews reveal a man far more consumed by the process of acting than by the trappings of fame.

Pacino’s body of work has earned him widespread acclaim and top spots on acting rankings. In 2003, British viewers voted him the Greatest Movie Star of All Time in a Channel 4 poll, and VH1 named him among the 200 Greatest Pop Culture Icons. Major publications have also frequently recognized his stature: Empire placed him fourth among all-time movie stars in 1997 and among the 50 greatest actors in a 2022 reader poll, while Esquire ranked him sixth on its 2022 list of history's greatest actors and named him among the "10 Best Living Actors" in 2023. A number of his films are considered classics of American cinema: four (The Godfather, The Godfather Part II, Dog Day Afternoon, and Scarface) are preserved in the U.S. National Film Registry of the Library of Congress, while three were selected for Time Out magazine's list of 100 best movies as chosen by industry actors.

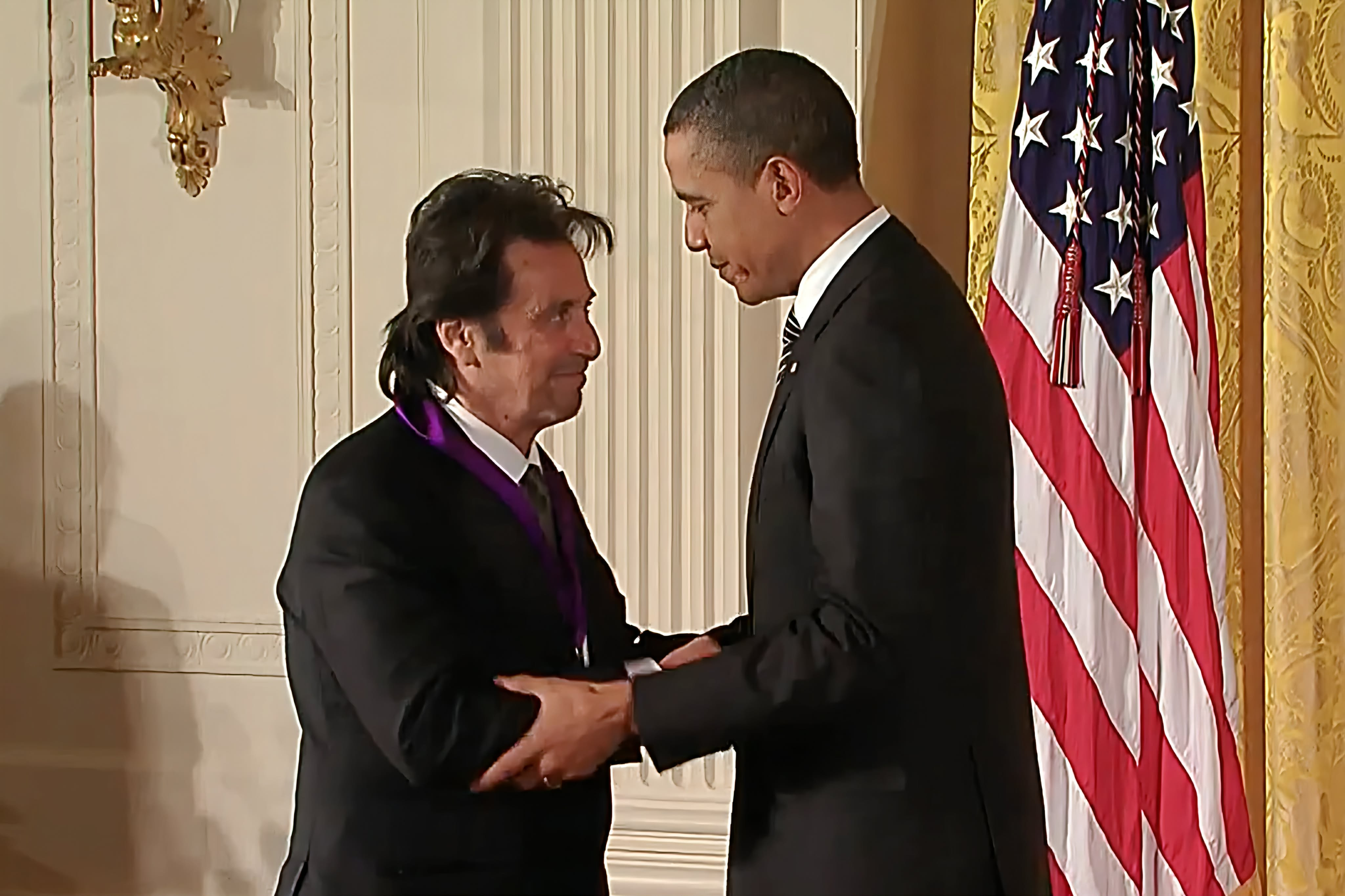
Pacino received the National Medal of Arts from President Barack Obama in 2011

Beyond individual films, his career has been celebrated with major institutional honors, including the Golden Globe Cecil B. DeMille Award (2001), the American Film Institute Life Achievement Award (2007), and the National Medal of Arts (2011). He received the Kennedy Center Honors in 2016, where President Barack Obama praised him for prioritizing his artistic devotion over the celebrity spotlight: "Al Pacino calls the theater his flashlight. It's how he finds himself, where he sees truth. And since Al first hit Broadway in 1969, his singular talent has been the gold standard for acting [...] Through it all, Al has always cared more for his flashlight than the spotlight. He says he's still getting used to the idea of being an icon, but his gift for all the inspiration and intensity that he brings to his roles is that he lets us into what his characters are feeling. And for that, we are extraordinarily grateful." Recognizing his lifelong commitment to classical theatre, he was also presented with the Sam Wanamaker Award by Shakespeare's Globe in 2026.

=== In popular culture ===
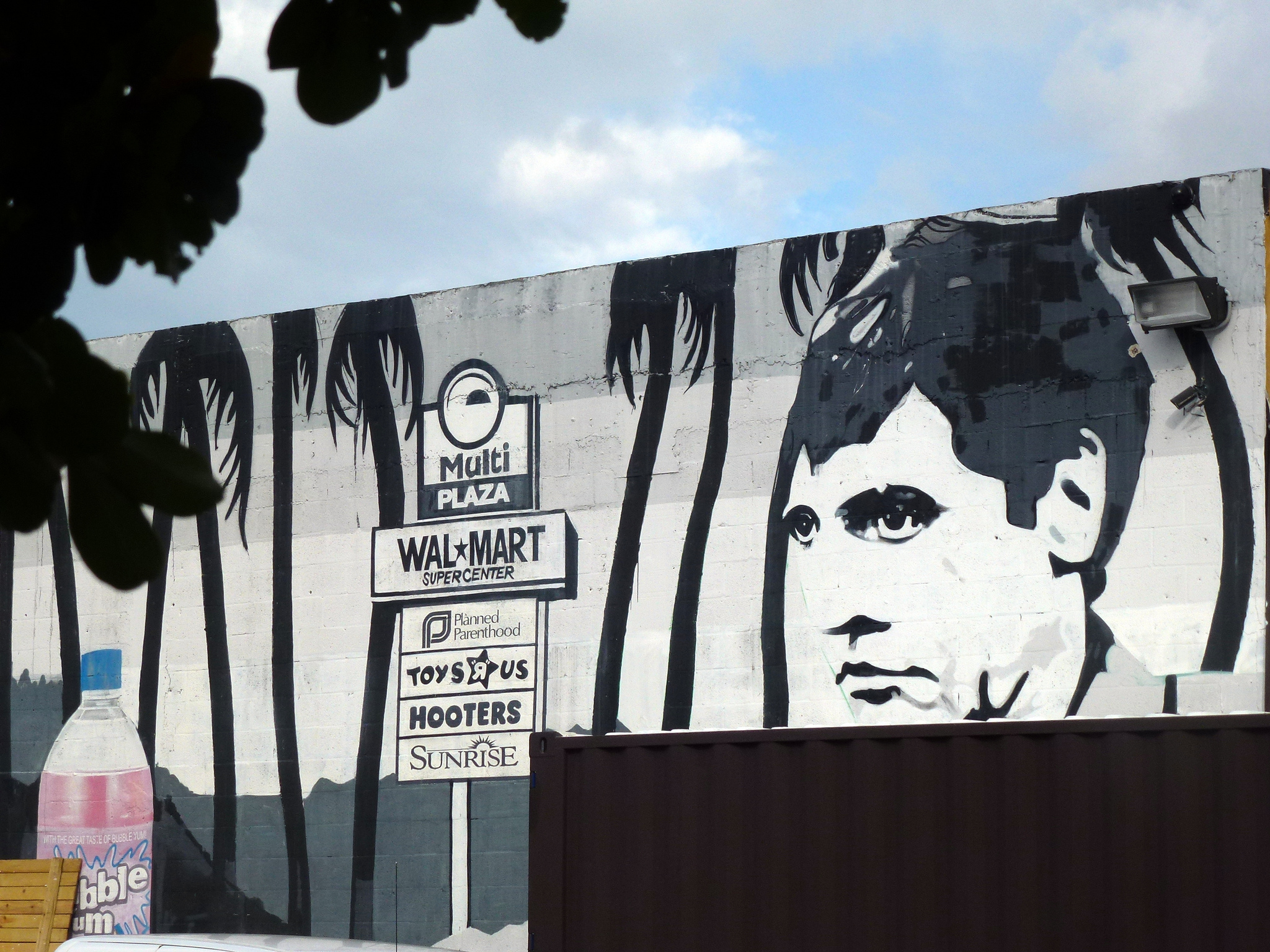
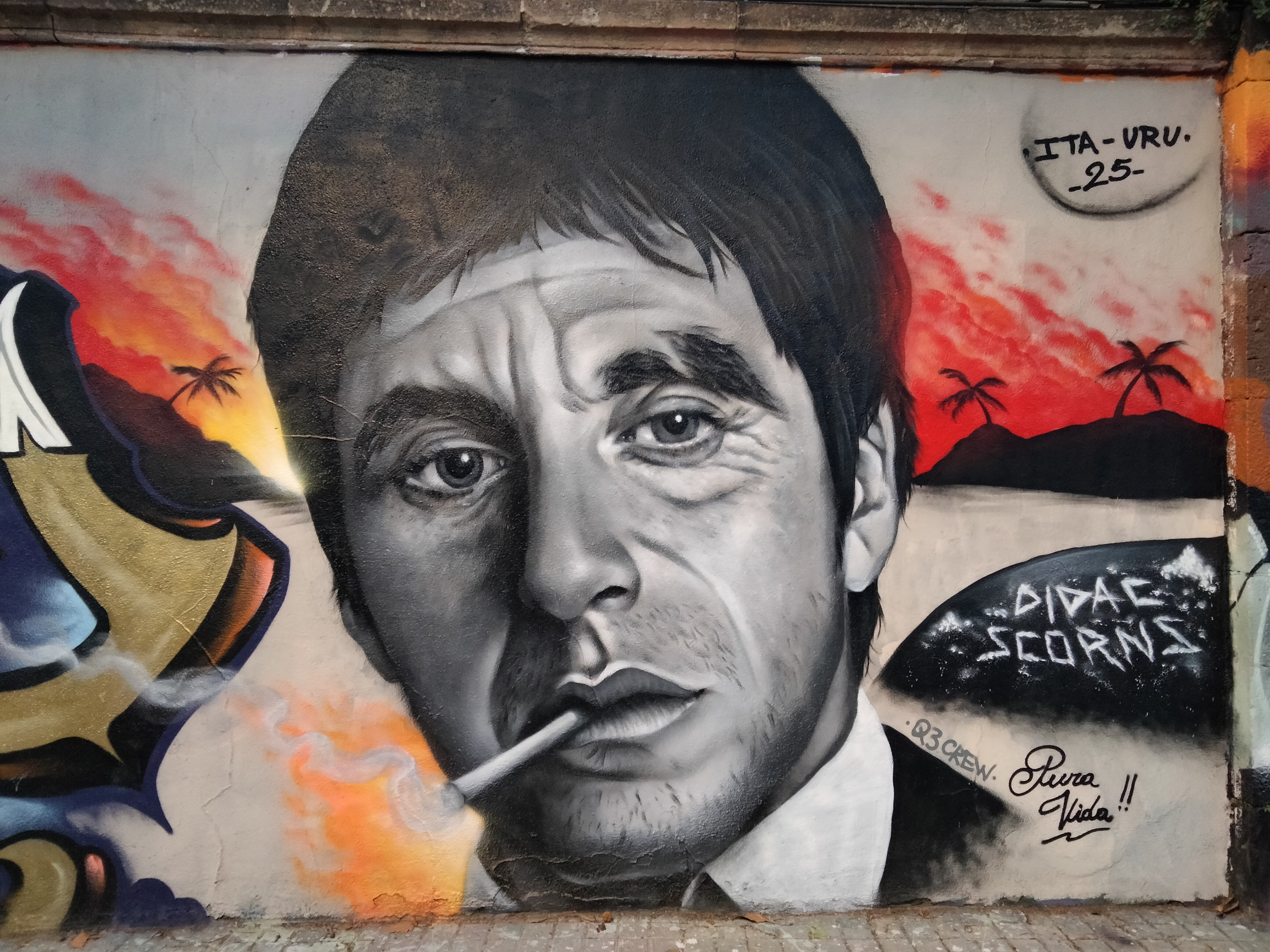
Murals of Pacino's "Tony Montana" character in Wynwood, U.S. in 2012 and in Barcelona, Spain in 2025

Pacino has been heavily referenced across television, music, film, and wider pop culture, largely due to roles that have made him an enduring touchstone for grit and power. As Vulture affirmed, "It's tempting to call him 'the inimitable Al Pacino,' although he is the most imitated actor in the world." Echoing this view, Entertainment Weekly remarked that his performative idiosyncrasies "gave gainful employment to entire generations of comedic impersonators." Among his most notable impersonators are Kevin Spacey and Alec Baldwin. Spacey once explained, "The reason we all love to do an impersonation of Al Pacino is because he has created characters that are unforgettable, and that's because for Al Pacino it's not just business, it's craft."

His iconic portrayals are prominently featured across the American Film Institute 100 Years... series, including two entries on the list of the 100 greatest screen characters—Frank Serpico as a hero and Michael Corleone as a villain—and three entries on the list of the top 100 movie quotations: "Keep your friends close, but your enemies closer" (Michael Corleone), "Say 'hello' to my little friend!" (Tony Montana), and "Attica! Attica!" (Sonny Wortzik). Other lines of his that transcended the screen include "The whole trial is out of order!" from ...And Justice for All, "Hoo-ah!" from Scent of a Woman, and "Just when I thought I was out, they pull me back in" from The Godfather Part III. As The Washington Post observed, "More indelible lines of dialogue are associated with him than with almost any other actor, a testament not only to the way the roles were written but to how he came to own them." Readers of Empire voted both Michael Corleone and Tony Montana onto the magazine's list of the greatest movie characters of all time, while Entertainment Weekly highlighted his portrayal of Lefty Ruggiero in Donnie Brasco among the "100 Greatest Performances that should have won Oscars but didn't."

Pacino's influence extends into music, with artists across genres paying homage to him, particularly to his role as Tony Montana in Scarface. Hip-hop figures including Jay-Z, the Notorious B.I.G., Nas, Future, August D., Nicki Minaj, Drake, and Tony Yayo have all referenced him in their work. Bob Dylan also referenced the actor on his 2020 album Rough and Rowdy Ways, singing on the track "My Own Version of You": "I'll take the Scarface Pacino and the Godfather Brando / Mix 'em up in a tank and get a robot commando."

Within the acting community, Pacino has been acknowledged as a primary influence by numerous performers, such as Steve Buscemi, Jeffrey Wright, Bobby Cannavale, Javier Bardem, Michael Imperioli, and Jamie Foxx. Other actors, such as John Cusack, Russell Crowe, Johnny Depp, Colin Farrell, and Matthew McConaughey, have all agreed to participate in film projects after his involvement was confirmed.

== Personal life ==
=== Relationships and children ===
Pacino had a relationship with his The Godfather trilogy co-star Diane Keaton. Their on-again, off-again relationship ended after the filming of The Godfather Part III. He has had relationships with Jill Clayburgh, Tuesday Weld, Marthe Keller, Veruschka, Kathleen Quinlan, Lyndall Hobbs, Penelope Ann Miller, and Meital Dohan. Pacino had a ten-year relationship with Argentine actress Lucila Polak from 2008 to 2018.

Pacino has four children. The eldest, Julie Marie (born October 16, 1989), is his daughter with acting coach Jan Tarrant. He has twins conceived through IVF and born January 25, 2001, with actress Beverly D'Angelo, with whom he had a relationship from 1997 until 2003. He has a son, born June 15, 2023, with producer Noor Alfallah, with whom he had a relationship from 2022 to 2024. Pacino, at age 83, is one of the oldest fathers on record. He has never been married.

=== Health and addiction ===
Pacino has admitted to abusing alcohol and pills (specifically downers) early in his career, partly because he found his sudden rise to fame after The Godfather difficult to cope with. He achieved sobriety in 1977. In his memoir, Pacino stated that he has never taken cocaine in his life, even though there's the "general belief" that he is a cocaine addict due to his roles in films like Scarface.

Pacino said in 2024 that he almost died of COVID-19 in 2020; his near-death experience has led him to doubt the existence of an afterlife.

== Acting credits and accolades ==
Pacino has won and been nominated for many awards during his acting career, including nine Oscar nominations (winning one) and five BAFTA nominations (winning one) for his film work; 19 Golden Globe nominations (winning four) and seven SAG Award nominations (winning two), each recognizing both his film and TV work; three Primetime Emmy Award nominations (winning two) solely for his work on television; and three Tony Award nominations (winning two) for his stage work.

Pacino is one of the few performers to have achieved the Triple Crown of Acting and has received awards and nominations from the highest honors in American film, television, and theater for the following performances:

Academy Awards

- 45th Academy Awards (1973): Best Supporting Actor, nomination, for The Godfather
- 46th Academy Awards (1974): Best Actor, nomination, for Serpico
- 47th Academy Awards (1975): Best Actor, nomination, for The Godfather Part II
- 48th Academy Awards (1976): Best Actor, nomination, for Dog Day Afternoon
- 52nd Academy Awards (1980): Best Actor, nomination, for ...And Justice for All
- 63rd Academy Awards (1991): Best Supporting Actor, nomination, for Dick Tracy
- 65th Academy Awards (1993): Best Supporting Actor, nomination, for Glengarry Glen Ross
- 65th Academy Awards (1993): Best Actor, win, for Scent of a Woman
- 92nd Academy Awards (2020): Best Supporting Actor, nomination, for The Irishman

Primetime Emmy Awards

- 56th Primetime Emmy Awards (2004): Outstanding Lead Actor in a Limited or Anthology Series or Movie, win, for Angels in America
- 62nd Primetime Emmy Awards (2010): Outstanding Lead Actor in a Limited or Anthology Series or Movie, win, for You Don't Know Jack
- 65th Primetime Emmy Awards (2013): Outstanding Lead Actor in a Limited or Anthology Series or Movie, nomination, for Phil Spector

Tony Awards

- 23rd Tony Awards (1969): Best Featured Actor in a Play, win, for Does a Tiger Wear a Necktie?
- 31st Tony Awards (1977): Best Actor in a Play, win, for The Basic Training of Pavlo Hummel
- 65th Tony Awards (2011): Best Actor in a Play, nomination, for The Merchant of Venice

== Bibliography ==
- Pacino, Al (2024). Sonny Boy: A Memoir (First hardcover ed.). New York: Penguin Press. ISBN 9780593655115. OCLC 1425980020.

== See also ==
- List of Italian-American actors
- List of people from New York City
- List of actors with Academy Award nominations
- List of actors with more than one Academy Award nomination in the acting categories
- List of Primetime Emmy Award winners
- List of Golden Globe winners

== Explanatory notes ==
Preceded by Paul Newman	President of the Actors Studio; 1994–present With: Ellen Burstyn; Harvey Keitel	Incumbent
Preceded by Lee Strasberg	Artistic Director of the Actors Studio; 1982; With: Ellen Burstyn	Succeeded by Ellen Burstyn
