= An Almost Perfect Affair =

1979 film

- DVD release cover
- Directed by: Michael Ritchie
- Written by: Walter Bernstein; Don Petersen
- Produced by: Terry Carr
- Starring: Keith Carradine; Monica Vitti; Raf Vallone
- Cinematography: Henri Decaë
- Edited by: Richard A. Harris
- Music by: Georges Delerue
- Distributed by: Paramount Pictures
- Release date: April 27, 1979
- Running time: 93 minutes
- Country: United States
- Language: English
- Budget: $2.5 million
- Box office: $85,493 (US)

An Almost Perfect Affair is a 1979 romantic comedy film directed by Michael Ritchie and starring Keith Carradine and Monica Vitti. The plot is about an affair between filmmaker Hal Raymond and film producer Freddie Barone's wife Maria, set during the Cannes Film Festival.

Despite several favorable reviews the film did not perform well upon release, and Paramount Pictures quickly withdrew it from circulation. It thus has a reputation as a 'lost' movie, although it has since been broadcast on television and is now available on DVD.

== Plot ==
Hal Raymond, a young tyro filmmaker fresh from graduate school, arrives in France to attend the Cannes Film Festival, where he hopes to sell a movie he has made about the life and times of famed murderer Gary Gilmore. Unbeknown to him, he has failed to observe the proper bureaucratic procedures when bringing his film reels into the country, which forces customs officials at Nice Airport to seize them until further notice. In another queue at the airport is Maria Barone, a glamorous former actress and the wife of leading Italian film producer Federico "Freddie" Barone. Maria's dog Mortimer is also retained at customs, after she is found to have concealed the animal in her hand luggage.

The following day, Hal returns to the airport to attend an interview at the customs agency with Lt. Montand, who tells him that the reels will not be released until the film censor has viewed them, which may not happen for another month. Leaving the office in a fury, Hal bumps into Maria, who has just been reunited with her dog. Informing her of his plight, she encourages him to persevere. The following day, Hal again encounters Maria in the lobby of the Hotel Carlton and invites her to lunch. Charmed by the young man's attention, Maria reckons that she can persuade her husband to contact the customs authorities and intervene on Hal's behalf. She then takes Hal to meet Freddie, who graciously agrees to phone the airport immediately.

In gratitude, Hal invites them both to a party in Nice being hosted by his friend, Andrew Jackson – a sardonic director-producer, in town to publicize his own blaxploitation film. Although a visibly flustered Maria declines the invitation, when the party is in full swing later that evening she suddenly turns up unannounced. Hal and Maria dance and talk, later going back to Hal's room at the local Novotel to make love. Lying in bed afterwards, Maria admits that this is the first time she has cheated on her spouse. Unimpressed by Hal's spartan accommodation, back in Cannes the next day she arranges to meet him at the Palm Beach casino, where she wins big at craps – enough money for her to book Hal into a fancy boutique hotel further along the coast. As they are entering the hotel Hal spies Montand sitting at a nearby restaurant, who delivers the good news that the censor will now view his film.

Hal and Maria then enjoy a blissful day out in the country, at the end of which he complains about not being able to spend an entire night with her. Although distressed at having to deceive her husband, Maria asks Freddie if she can spend two days away in Paris prior to his film's gala premiere – a request to which the latter agrees without complaint. Hal, meanwhile, having already found that Jackson has muscled in on his film and taken control of its publicity campaign – including changing the title from the bland Choice of Ending to the more lurid Shoot Me Before I Kill Again – now has to endure the censor's screening before he and Maria can meet for their planned few days together. After nervously introducing it to a seemingly nonplussed audience, Hal finds his film has inspired positive reactions – Jackson pronounces it "sensational", while Montand agrees that the film can finally be brought into the country. But Maria, who is also in attendance, is much less enthusiastic about what she has seen, and upon being forced to reveal her true feelings afterwards she and Hal have a row, causing him to abandon her and hitchhike alone back to Cannes.

Hal is overcome with remorse by the next morning and returns to the Carlton, where he is able to follow Maria's limousine as it heads to the Barone family yacht for an outing prior to Freddie's evening gala premiere. Pursuing her onto a speedboat, Hal manages to separate Maria from her companions and drives the boat out into the middle of the bay, where it runs out of fuel. In an effort to prove his love, he throws his precious film reels into the water. Maria is unimpressed, however, pointing out that he still has the original 16mm negative, so the gesture means nothing. Only after Hal begrudgingly proclaims out loud that he loves her more than his film are the two reconciled. Eventually whisked away to attend the gala premiere by her security detail, Maria leaves Hal to make his own way back to the shore. Realizing that Maria is set to leave the festival for good after the premiere is over, once on land Hal persuades Jackson to drive him to the airport. There he stops Maria and Freddie before they board their private jet. Maria explains that, although she loves him, she needs someone who considers her "more important than anything". After the jet has taken off into the night sky, Jackson improves Hal's mood by informing him that his film has been included in a package deal, and hands him a contract to sign.

== Cast ==
- Keith Carradine as Hal Raymond
- Monica Vitti as Maria Barone
- Raf Vallone as Federico "Freddie" Barone
- Christian De Sica as Carlo Barone
- Dick Anthony Williams as Andrew Jackson
- Anna Maria Horsford as Amy Zon
- Katya Berger as Maria and Freddie's Daughter
- Henri Garcin as Lt. Montand
- Andy Ho as Chinese Tycoon
- Sady Rebbot as Customs Official
- Michael Ritchie as Bus Passenger (uncredited)
- Rona Barrett as herself (uncredited)
- Roger Ebert as himself (uncredited)
- Farrah Fawcett as herself (uncredited)
- Marco Ferreri as himself (uncredited)
- Sergio Leone as himself (uncredited)
- Paul Mazursky as himself (uncredited)
- George Peppard as himself (uncredited)
- Rex Reed as himself (uncredited)
- Brooke Shields as herself (uncredited)
- Edy Williams as herself (uncredited)

== Production ==
Director Michael Ritchie was first inspired to make a movie about the film industry after visiting the Venice Film Festival in 1972 while promoting The Candidate. Upon learning of George Lucas's own experiences when at the 1971 Cannes Film Festival for a screening of THX 1138, Ritchie enlisted Don Petersen to help write a screenplay that captured the giddy euphoria of a young director attending an international film festival for the first time. As he later divulged to The New York Times, he chose to make the film "small-scale" and low budget so that he could persuade Paramount to let him assume the right to script approval and control over the final cut as a quid pro quo. Once a basic outline of the film's story was complete, Ritchie travelled to the 1978 Cannes Film Festival with a second-unit crew to shoot documentary footage that would provide some background flavour, encouraging his cameraman to mix with movie celebrities, eavesdrop on conversations, and record any interesting scenes that developed – such as, memorably, the sight of newscaster Rona Barrett slipping and falling while presenting an item directly to camera. During the Festival, Ritchie recruited Keith Carradine to play the part of Hal Raymond, and once Monica Vitti was cast as Maria Barone, both Petersen and his fellow screenwriter Walter Bernstein (who also co-wrote Ritchie's previous film, Semi-Tough) redrafted the script to ensure that these two leading roles closely matched the personalities of the actors.

Principal photography began in August 1978, continuing through to the following month. The film was shot under the working title of Cannes Game (a pun: "Cannes" is frequently mispronounced by Americans as "con") on location in Nice, Cannes, and the Côte d'Azur. Ritchie was able to include in his sets several posters and signage for films that had been advertised during the 1978 Cannes Film Festival – including, for example, Revenge of the Pink Panther and The Shout – having made arrangements with the owners to buy such material at the time and keep it in storage until production commenced. (He recalled years later that when posters had been put up at the Festival advertising Shoot Me Before I Kill Again, the fictitious movie at the heart of the film's story, many producers "popped up to try to invest" in it in the seeming belief that it was real.) The production crew, including veteran cinematographer Henri Decaë and art director Willy Holt, were based in France; as Ritchie could not speak French, he had to resort to using sign language instead. Communication issues did not abate there, however, as Ritchie had to hire a dialogue coach so that Vitti (starring in her first Anglophone production since Modesty Blaise thirteen years earlier) could improve her command of English; he later reported that there were "still times one had to strain to understand her."

== Reception ==
=== Critical response ===
The film divided critics upon its release. Some praised it simply for being enjoyable entertainment, with the Toronto Globe and Mail describing it as a "charming diversion" and "a well-crafted, nicely balanced film". Many enthused about the Cannes backdrop: Richard Grenier of Cosmopolitan extolled Ritchie for capturing the "wonderful madness of Cannes in all its gaudy splendor", while Boxoffice magazine considered the setting to be "one of the stars of the film". Charles Champlin of the Los Angeles Times concurred, noting that "Ritchie's unexpectedly acute and sensitive story" was adept at reflecting the glamour and "shady opportunism" of the festival. The performances of several of the cast were also warmly received, with Monica Vitti coming in for particular praise: David Ansen of Newsweek felt that "The revelation of the film is that the throaty, glamorous Vitti is a marvelous comedienne – a chic Magnani bubbling with earthy, sensuous mischief and infectious high spirits", while "Poll" of Variety – in an otherwise skeptical review – praised her "fine, meticulous performance". Frank Rich, writing in Time, even described Raf Vallone's portrayal of Freddie Barone (which many film critics suggested was based either on Dino De Laurentiis or Carlo Ponti) as "so appealing that it is hard to know why Vitti would forsake him."

On the other hand, several reviews concluded that the film was too slight to be memorable, frequently ruing Ritchie's apparent inability to make the most of satirizing the machinations that occupy the film industry behind closed doors. Alexander Keneas of Newsday epitomized this view when he opined that "It is perhaps unfair to criticize An Almost Perfect Affair... for not living up to a preconceived idea. But a better Cannes would have made for a better movie, especially since the festival isn't merely a backdrop: the love story is supposed to mirror, in microcosm, the high-powered, everything-is-movies atmosphere." Variety, in turn, rebuked the love affair for "never commanding as much interest" as the "dizzy hoopla" of its background. Only Janet Maslin, writing for The New York Times, struck a dissenting note, remarking that the two lovers were "funny, sexy and sublimely incompatible... whenever the scene shifts to the festival in overview, Mr. Carradine, Miss Vitti and their spooning are sorely missed."

=== Publicity and box office ===
Even before the film was released it ran into trouble. The Motion Picture Association initially classified the film as 'R' (restricted), on the grounds that it included "sexually derived expletives", a decision that was only overturned on appeal; the film was subsequently reclassified as 'PG' (parental guidance). It was then reported that Monica Vitti was unwilling to publicize the film in the United States on account of her fear of flying, a position she apparently maintained even after Paramount offered to book her a place on an Atlantic ship and charter a train to transport her across America; consequently, the studio had to cancel the first leg of the film's North American publicity tour in its entirety. Michael Ritchie also had to deny speculation that the love affair in the film was derived from his own personal experience.

An Almost Perfect Affair was released in only three American cities: New York City, San Francisco and Los Angeles. One New York movie theatre, the Trans-Lux East, hosted an exclusive run, but after four weeks Paramount decided to withdraw the film from general release. According to Jon Gould, then Director of Marketing Administration at Paramount, the film had "no word of mouth" even though "there was a high awareness level for it and a striking campaign. You try to make it work and if it doesn't, you pull it." Paramount's decision not to launch a back-up campaign to gain momentum disappointed Ritchie, who believed that An Almost Perfect Affair was the victim of the studio's decision to release Robert Altman's similarly themed and titled movie A Perfect Couple just three weeks beforehand. Ritchie later commented ruefully that the film was "one of his own favorite pieces of work", but virtually nobody among the cinemagoing public could be persuaded to watch it: "It wasn't that they went to see it and hated it. They didn't even go to see it on the first day."

The film was distributed in no country other than the US, aside from a brief release in Toronto, Canada, at the end of 1979. Despite the presence of two major Italian film stars (Vitti and Vallone) among its cast, Ritchie later jocularly explained that it could only have been shown in Italy if an additional scene was filmed depicting Vallone, as the cuckold Freddie, punching Hal (Carradine) in the face. The first time it was broadcast in the United Kingdom was on Channel Four Television in January 1985, where it attracted 3.6 million viewers.

== DVD release ==
An Almost Perfect Affair was released by Paramount Pictures on Region 1 DVD in September 2003.

== Soundtrack ==
The film's score was composed by Georges Delerue. It was released as a limited-edition album on CD by Varèse Sarabande in 2006.
