= Don Petersen (playwright) =

American dramatist (1927–1998)

- Born: August 8, 1927; Davenport, Iowa, United States
- Died: April 25, 1998 (aged 70); Pittsfield, Massachusetts, United States
- Citizenship: United States
- Occupation: Writer
- Writing career
- Language: English
- Genres: Theatre, screenwriting

Don Petersen (August 8, 1927 – April 25, 1998) was an American playwright and screenwriter. Born in Davenport, Iowa, Petersen wrote the play Does a Tiger Wear a Necktie?, which debuted on Broadway on February 25, 1969, and ran for only 39 performances after 19 previews. Though a failure at the box office, the play was a succès d'estime, garnering Al Pacino a Tony Award and a Drama Desk Award.

Actor Ron Thompson would later go on to win the Los Angeles Drama Critics Circle Award for his 1973 theatre lead performance in Does a Tiger Wear a Necktie?

Petersen's second Broadway play, The Enemy is Dead, was a flop, opening and closing after one performance on January 14, 1973.

Petersen was credited with the screenplays for Deadly Hero (1975), An Almost Perfect Affair (1979) and Target (1985).

He died on April 25, 1998, at the age of 70 in Pittsfield, Massachusetts.
