= ...And Justice for All (film) =

1979 film by Norman Jewison

...And Justice for All.
- Theatrical release poster
- Directed by: Norman Jewison
- Written by: Valerie Curtin; Barry Levinson
- Produced by: Norman Jewison; Patrick Palmer
- Starring: Al Pacino; Jack Warden; John Forsythe; Lee Strasberg
- Cinematography: Victor J. Kemper
- Edited by: John F. Burnett
- Music by: Dave Grusin
- Distributed by: Columbia Pictures
- Release dates: September 15, 1979 (Toronto); October 19, 1979 (United States)
- Running time: 119 minutes
- Country: United States
- Language: English
- Budget: $4 million
- Box office: $33.3 million

...And Justice for All. is a 1979 American legal drama film directed by Norman Jewison and starring Al Pacino, Jack Warden and John Forsythe. Lee Strasberg, Jeffrey Tambor, Christine Lahti, Craig T. Nelson, Thomas Waites and Sam Levene (in his final screen performance) appear in supporting roles. The Academy Award-nominated screenplay was written by Valerie Curtin and Barry Levinson. It was filmed in Baltimore, including the courthouse area. It received two Academy Award nominations: Best Actor (Pacino) and Best Original Screenplay (Curtin and Levinson).

== Plot ==
Arthur Kirkland, a Baltimore defense attorney, is in jail on a contempt-of-court charge after throwing a punch at Judge Henry T. Fleming while arguing the case of Jeff McCullaugh. McCullaugh was stopped for a minor traffic offense, then mistaken for a killer of the same name and has already spent a year and a half in jail without being convicted of a crime. Although there is strong new evidence that McCullaugh is innocent, Fleming refuses to consider his appeal due to its late submission, so he remains in prison. Kirkland starts a new case defending Ralph Agee, a young black cross-dresser arrested for a robbery who is terrified of being sent to prison.

Kirkland regularly visits his grandfather Sam, who is becoming increasingly senile, in a nursing home. It is revealed that Sam put Kirkland through law school. Kirkland also begins a romance with legal ethics committee member Gail Packer. Kirkland has a friendly relationship with Judge Francis Rayford, who takes him on a ride in his personal helicopter, in which Rayford flies recklessly. Rayford, a Korean War veteran, is borderline suicidal; at all times, he keeps a rifle in his chambers at the courthouse and an M1911 pistol in his shoulder holster. He even eats his lunch on a ledge outside his office window, four stories up.

One day, Kirkland is unexpectedly requested to defend Judge Fleming, who has been accused of brutally assaulting and raping a young woman, Leah Shepard. Although the two loathe each other, Fleming feels that having the person who publicly hates him argue his innocence will be to his advantage. Fleming blackmails Kirkland with an old violation of attorney-client confidentiality, for which Kirkland will likely be disbarred if it were to come to light. Kirkland's friend and partner Jay Porter is also unstable. He feels guilt for gaining acquittals for defendants who were truly guilty of violent crimes. Porter soon shaves his head, claiming that it will make his hair grow back thicker, but he keeps shaving it. After a violent breakdown inside the courthouse, wherein he ends up throwing dinner plates at everybody in the hallway, Porter is taken to a psychiatric hospital.

Before leaving in the ambulance, Kirkland asks another partner, Warren Fresnell, to handle Agee's court hearing in his absence. Kirkland gives Fresnell a corrected version of Agee's probation report and stresses that it must be shown to the judge, so that Agee will receive probation rather than serve jail time. Fresnell is distracted by another immediate case when he arrives at the courthouse and forgets to give Judge Burns the corrected version, causing Agee to be sentenced to three years in jail. Kirkland is livid and attacks Fresnell's car, revealing that thirty minutes after he was sentenced, Agee killed himself. Later, McCullaugh, who has been sexually and physically assaulted by other inmates, finally snaps and takes two hostages after stealing a gun. Kirkland pleads with him to surrender, promising to get him out but a police sniper shoots and kills McCullaugh when he moves in front of a window.

A clearly disturbed Kirkland takes on Judge Fleming's case. Prosecuting attorney Frank Bowers hopes to make his reputation by convicting a judge. Kirkland's client Carl Travers hopes to receive free legal services by offering photos of Judge Fleming engaged in BDSM with Shepard the night of her beating. Gail reminds Kirkland of his professional obligations to defend the judge. Kirkland shows the pictures to Fleming, who admits that he is guilty.

At the trial, Fleming jokes that he would like to see Shepard sometime. In his opening statement, Kirkland sarcastically muses about the legal system and Bowers's ambition. He surprises the court by revealing to the court that Fleming is guilty and that he, in his own words, "should go right to fucking jail; the son of a bitch is guilty!". Kirkland is dragged out of the courtroom, venting his rage the whole way, saying that the Judge hurts people. Gail leads the spectators in cheering for Kirkland, as Fleming sits down in defeat and a fed-up Rayford storms out. As an exhausted Kirkland sits on the courthouse steps, Porter passes on his way back to work, tipping his wig to Kirkland.

== Cast ==
- Al Pacino as Arthur Kirkland
- Jack Warden as Judge Francis Rayford
- John Forsythe as Judge Henry T. Fleming
- Lee Strasberg as Sam Kirkland
- Jeffrey Tambor as Jay Porter
- Christine Lahti as Gail Packer
- Sam Levene as Arnie
- Robert Christian as Ralph Agee
- Thomas Waites as Jeff McCullaugh
- Larry Bryggman as Warren Fresnell
- Craig T. Nelson as Frank Bowers
- Dominic Chianese as Carl Travers
- Victor Arnold as Leo Fauci
- Vincent Beck as Officer Leary
- Baxter Harris as Larry
- Joe Morton as Prison Doctor
- Alan North as Deputy Sheriff
- Tom Quinn as Kiley
- Beverly Sanders as Sherry
- Connie Sawyer as Gitel
- Charles Siebert as ADA Keene
- Robert Symonds as Judge Burns
- Keith Andes as Marvin Bates
- Vasili Bogazianos as Avilar
- Darrell Zwerling as William Zinoff
- J. G. Hertzler as Driver
- Teri Wooten as Leah Shepard
- Sidney Clute as Polic
- Johnny Haymer as Crenna
- Donald Saonitz as Defense Attorney

== Production ==
Norman Jewison said that he was attracted to the script because it clarified for him the reality that the courtroom is a kind of stage where a drama is played out. He was intrigued by the satirical possibilities of the scenario. He also drew parallels to contemporary politics. "There was a time when the legal profession was inviolate," he said. "Then came Watergate...We're starting to realize that being in the law doesn't mean being above the law." He was careful to delineate the film's genre. "It's difficult at times to pull the audience back. Sometimes they start to go with the film as a melodrama. We were then able to pull them back with something almost absurd, to shock them out of it because I didn't want it to become a message picture."

Barry Levinson's high school friend Donald Saiontz, a practicing attorney, advised him on the screenplay. When the production got off the ground, Saointz served as an advisor for Al Pacino and John Forsythe. He appears in the film as a defense attorney. Lee Strasberg took a small role as a way of helping his student and friend. He was worried that Pacino was being typecast and wanted to see him branch out. Jewison felt that Pacino's role of Arthur Kirkland was an inversion of his usual, where Kirkland was the sane person surrounded by nutcases. Pacino liked the fact that Kirkland "was a part of things, not a loner. The sort of characters I usually play are anti-heroes."

The film was shot in Baltimore, including the courthouse area, the Washington Monument of the Mount Vernon district and Fort McHenry. Pacino practiced the "You're out of order!" scene 26 times at the building ledge. Mayor William Donald Schaefer and the city film commission fully supported the production, which spent $1.5 million locally.

== Release ==
The film premiered as the closing night gala presentation at the 1979 Toronto International Film Festival on September 15, 1979.

== Reception ==
...And Justice for All scores 78% on Rotten Tomatoes, 58/100 on Metacritic and 23/30 on Zagat. Empire magazine calls it a "solid but slightly clichéd courtroom drama" and rates it 3 stars out of 5. The film was a box-office success. Produced on a modest budget of $4 million, it grossed more than $33.3 million in North America, making it the 24th highest-grossing film of 1979.

Robert Osborne of The Hollywood Reporter raved, "The film is loaded with virtues...it has all the makings of an enormously popular movie." Roger Regent, a French critic, called it one of the most remarkable and important films of the season. Dewey E. Chester of the New Pittsburgh Courier drew parallels to the Watergate scandal and the recent arrest of a state politician on a sodomy charge.

According to Newsday, most critics did not like the film. Roger Ebert of the Chicago Sun-Times felt that the film was so overstuffed that it was an "anthology" held together by "one of those high-voltage Al Pacino performances that's so sure of itself we hesitate to demur." He concluded, "The closing courtroom scenes are constructed as a machine to make the audience cheer, and the machine works." Vincent Canby of The New York Times described the general hysteria of the actors as if they had been directed to play "the last act of Three Men on a Horse". He calls Pacino's character Kirkland "a hyperventilating idiot" and speculates that everyone in the film has "such low thresholds of emotional distress that I wouldn't trust one of them to see The Sound of Music unless accompanied by a parent or adult guardian." Variety said that the film's blend of comedy and drama was unsuccessful but not incompetent.

One critic mused that it was as "commercial as a 60-second K-tel ad and as utterly devoid of substance as a lawyer's opening statement." The Jewish Advocate compared the film unfavorably to The Hospital for its inability to match Paddy Chayefsky's mordant screenplay. The reviewer described the ending as "a bad Perry Mason television show". The Boston Globe lamented the film's inability to be a legal version of Catch-22 and faulted the director. "...And Justice For All spills its potential drama all over the screen and Jewison never stops to clean up the mess."

The film has been read as a commentary on the outsider status of Jews in the WASP-dominated judicial system. William Schoell pointed to Kirkland's reaction to Ralph Agee (Robert Christian)'s suicide as one of the "strongest scenes Pacino has ever played" and gives the actor credit for "triumphing over an impossible script". Brian W. Fairbanks also called the film's screenplay "overly contrived".

The film received two Academy Award nominations. Al Pacino was nominated for Best Actor and Valerie Curtin and Barry Levinson were nominated for Best Original Screenplay at the 52nd Academy Awards. Pacino was also nominated for a Golden Globe Award for Best Actor in a Motion Picture – Drama for his performance at the 37th Golden Globes.

== Themes ==
And Justice for All has been discussed in a variety of ways in academic criticism. One critic sees the film as both a spin on archetypes culled from Arthurian mythology and as a vehicle for Jewison's social critique, citing how the director had "wanted to tell a story that made people think about whether the system still allowed for justice". Another critic sees the film as an exploration of the potential "futility of virtue" as represented by the film's idealist protagonist. A third critic sees the film as engaging with 1970s skepticism of public institutions, noting that the film professes a belief in the idealist lawyer while also rejecting any belief or trust in the criminal justice system as a whole. One critic has also noted that the film's opening juxtaposition of the majestic courthouse, with grubby interiors and children mangling the Pledge of Allegiance, suggests that "the promise of law ... nearly impossible to experience or achieve".

== Legacy ==
Kirkland's opening statement during the film's climax contains its most famous moment, including the outburst, "You're out of order! You're out of order! The whole trial is out of order! They're out of order!" This scene has been parodied many times in popular media, such as in The Simpsons, Chappelle's Show, Family Guy, The Mentalist and The Big Bang Theory. Charles Champlin viewed this scene as the most "rousing finale since Rocky I" and Filmsite named this scene one of the Best Film Speeches and Monologues. MSN Canada noted that the whole phrase is one of the top 10 "misquoted movie lines". Metallica's 1988 album ...And Justice for All takes its name from the film.

=== Television series adaptation ===
In June 2026, a television series adaptation of the film has been announced to be in the works at Netflix, with Jeremy Miller and Dan Cohn attached as writers.
