= Does a Tiger Wear a Necktie? =

1969 play by Don Petersen

- Original theatre poster
- Original language: English
- Written by: Don Petersen
- Characters: Bickham, Fullendorf, Conrad
- Setting: A rehabilitation center for juvenile narcotics addicts located on an island in a river bordering on a large industrial city. Present time.

Premiere
- Date: February 25, 1969
- Place: Belasco Theatre, New York City

Does a Tiger Wear a Necktie? (1969) was written by American playwright and screenwriter Don Petersen and premiered at the Belasco Theatre in New York. It helped to launch the careers of actors Al Pacino, Roger Robinson and Ron Thompson.

== Title ==
The character Fullendorf says, "Does a tiger wear a necktie? It ain't for us to go straight. We're like the tigers. We always chucked on raw meat. We was raised on it, and we like it."

"Does a tiger wear a necktie? No, it would be against his nature – and reform is against the nature of addicts like Bickham", Clive Barnes explained in his New York Times review.

== Plot ==
The story is a racially charged drama about teen drug addicts at a rehabilitation center, located on an island in a river bordering a large industrial city.

An English teacher tries to make a difference in his students' lives. He encounters barriers in trying to do this—the same barriers created by the system that hinders the addicts' development and keeps them coming back.

One addict, Bickham, is a tough white teenager who searched for his father and found him working in a seedy barber shop. Upon meeting his son, the barber shows him a dirty photograph.

Contrasting Bickham is Conrad, an African-American addict. Conrad wants to recover and marry his love Linda. During the play, his character leaves the rehabilitation group to live with his sister, who is also an addict.

Aside from the students, there are only four characters in the rehabilitation center – a teacher, a psychiatrist, a policeman, and the center's principal.

== Production ==
Does a Tiger Wear a Necktie? was directed by Michael Schultz in his Broadway debut after years of professional work with the Negro Ensemble Company, and was produced by Huntington Hartford, an heir to the A&P supermarket empire.

The original 1969 production was at the Belasco Theatre. It had nine previews and thirty-nine performances.

The play enjoyed a 2002 revival at the Looking Glass Theatre in New York, where it was directed by Michael LoPorto. It is a regular on the community and school theater circuit and in acting classes.

=== Cast ===
The play helped launch the career of Al Pacino, who won a Tony Award for Best Dramatic Actor in a Supporting Role for his portrayal of Bickham. Jack Kroll in Newsweek wrote that Pacino had "the choreography of a hood, with a poetic soul."

A poll by Variety of drama critics named Pacino the "most promising new Broadway actor" for his performance.

Hal Holbrook played Mr. Winters, the teacher who cared enough to reach his students. He shared above-the-title billing with David Opatoshu, who played the psychiatrist who is threatened by Bickham. Lauren Jones received a 1969 Tony nomination for playing Linda. Michael Brandon played Prince, and Conrad was portrayed by Roger Robinson.

Actor Ron Thompson later won the Los Angeles Drama Critics Circle Award for his 1973 theater lead performance in Does a Tiger Wear a Necktie?

== Awards and nominations ==
=== Original Broadway production ===
Year	Award	Category	Nominee	Result
1969	Tony Award	Best Featured Actor in a Play	Al Pacino	Won
1969	Tony Award	Best Featured Actress in a Play	Lauren Jones	Nominated
1969	Tony Award	Best Direction of a Play	Michael Schultz	Nominated
1969	Drama Desk Award	Outstanding Performance	Al Pacino	Won
1969	Drama Desk Award	Outstanding Director	Michael Schultz	Won
1969	Theatre World Award		Lauren Jones	Won
1969	Theatre World Award		Al Pacino	Won

== Impact ==
The play portrays addicts as the victims of loveless upbringings. They fail in isolation or find strength in love.

The play, however, was characterized as more of a documentary about the lives of addicts and our rehabilitation system. It does not provide morality or solutions. It leaves judgment to the audience.
