= The Basic Training of Pavlo Hummel =

1971 play by David Rabe

- Original Broadway windowcard (1977). Due to popular demand, the limited run was extended to September 3.
- Original language: English
- Written by: David Rabe
- Series: Rabe's Vietnam trilogy
- Genre: Drama

Premiere
- Date: May 19, 1971
- Place: The Public Theater, New York City

The Basic Training of Pavlo Hummel is a play by American playwright and screenwriter David Rabe.

Rabe's first play in his Vietnam War trilogy that continued with Sticks and Bones and Streamers, its story is bracketed by scenes depicting the death of the everyman-like title character, who mindlessly grabs at a live hand grenade tossed into the Saigon brothel he is visiting. A born loser who is drafted into the United States Army, Hummel immediately encounters difficulties with both his sergeants and fellow recruits, none of whom trust him. As he stumbles through basic training and comes ever closer to the battlefield, he is guided by Ardell, a mysteriously ambiguous character who seemingly is an officer but serves as Hummel's conscience and a Greek chorus-like figure as well. Although injured repeatedly, Hummel is so determined to be a soldier he passes up a chance to go home, a decision that ultimately proves fatal.

== Productions ==
Under the auspices of the New York Shakespeare Festival, the play premiered Off-Broadway at The Public Theater on May 19, 1971. Directed by Jeff Bleckner, the cast included William Atherton as Hummel, Albert Hall as Ardell, and Joe Fields as Sgt. Tower

The play opened on Broadway at the Longacre Theatre on April 14, 1977 in previews, officially on April 24, 1977 and closed on September 3, 1977 after 117 performances. Directed by David Wheeler, the cast included Al Pacino as Hummel, Gustave Johnson as Ardell, and Joe Fields reprising his role as Sgt. Tower.

== Cast ==
=== Off Broadway production ===
Actor	Role
William Atherton	Pavlo Hummel
Victoria Racimo	Yen / Second Viet Cong
Albert Hall	Ardell
Joe Fields	Sgt. Tower
Earl Hindman	Kress
Peter Cameron	Parker
Rovert Lehman	Pierce
Anthony R. Charnota	Cpl. Ferrara
Edward Herrmann	Hinkle
Frederick Coffin	Mickey
Sloane Shelton	Mrs. Hummel
Garrett Moris	Jones
Christal Kim	Mama-san
Lee Wallace	Sgt. Brisbey
John Benson	Sgt. Wall
Bob Delegall	Parham
Edward Cannan	Captain Saunders / Captain Miller / Lieutenant Smith
Steven Clarke	Burns
Edward Cannan	Captain Saunders
John Walter Davis	Ryan
D. Franklyn Lenthall	Hendrix
Hoshin Seki	First Viet Cong / Farmer

=== Broadway production ===
Cast	Role
Al Pacino	Pavlo Hummel
Tisa Chang	Yen / Second Viet Cong
Gustave Johnson	Ardell
Joe Fields	Sgt. Tower
Larry Bryggman	Kress
Max Wright	Parker
Lance Henriksen	Pierce
Jack Kehoe	Corporal Jackson
Paul Guilfoyle	Hinkle
Ron Hunter	Mickey
Andrea Masters	Mrs. Sorrentino
Rebecca Drake	Mrs. Hummel
Don Blakely	Jones
Anne Miyamoto	Mama-san / Farmer
Richard Lynch	Sgt. Brisbey
Sully Boyar	Sgt. Wall
Damien Leake	Parham
Cameron Mason	Various Vietnamese
Gary Bolling	Burns / Private Grennel
Brad Sullivan	Captain Saunders
Michael Dinelli	Ryan
John Aquino	Hendrix
Kevin Maung	Gomez / First Viet Cong / Vietnamese Boy

== Awards and nominations ==
Source: Playbill Vault

Awards

- 1971 Drama Desk Award for Most Promising Director – Jeff Bleckner
- 1971 Drama Desk Award for Most Promising Playwright – David Rabe
- 1971 Obie Award for Distinguished Direction – Jeff Bleckner
- 1971 Theatre World Award – William Atherton
- 1977 Drama Desk Award for Outstanding Actor in a Play – Al Pacino
- 1977 Theatre World Award - Joe Fields
- 1977 Tony Award for Best Actor in Play – Al Pacino

Nominations

- 1977 Tony Award for Best Featured Actor in a Play – Joe Fields
