= Pilot and Chapter Two =

"Pilot" and "Chapter Two"
- The Firm episodes
- Episode nos.: Season 1 Episodes 1/2
- Directed by: David Straiton
- Written by: Lukas Reiter
- Editing by: Jane Kass
- Original air date: January 8, 2012
- Running time: 86 minutes

Episode chronology
← Previous —	Next → "Chapter Three"

"Pilot" and "Chapter Two" is the two-hour pilot episode of the NBC legal drama The Firm. The episode is set ten years after the John Grisham's 1991 novel and its 1993 film adaptation. It aired on January 8, 2012, as a two-hour series premiere.

According to The Hollywood Reporter's Tim Goodman, the pilot establishes several character traits: Lucas immediately delivers the impression that he is a good actor, who is both conventionally attractive and believable. Abby McDeere (Molly Parker) is a dutiful wife, but she has concerns about the finances of Mitch’s upstart solo firm. Claire McDeere (Natasha Calis), Mitch’s daughter, regrets the turmoil of a life on the run. Ray McDeere (Callum Keith Rennie) has a serious police record and serves Mitch as a private investigator. Tammy (Juliette Lewis), the office assistant and Ray's girlfriend, is a smoker, a nag and a provocative dresser.

The Pilot episode received mediocre reviews.

== Plot ==
The episode opens with a bleached-out opening sequence of a chase scene of Mitch McDeere (Josh Lucas) being chased in Washington, DC by three men in suits. It uses flashbacks to help the viewer get up to speed on Mitch's history, including some pedestrian legal cases. Following the chase, he makes his escape by jumping into the bed of a pickup truck. At one point in the chase scene, Mitch is able to call his wife on a payphone to give her the danger signal: "It’s happening again." Once he tells her that they have to go back to being on the run, the story flashes back to the recent past when the family emerged from witness protection. The flashback takes us six weeks prior and is presented in normal lighting. Among the essential facts quickly conveyed is that Mitchell McDeere was the whistle-blower who brought down a law firm that was a mob front without breaking the law or betraying his gangster clients. Yet, the mob kingpin responded to his own arrest by arranging a hit on McDeere, compelling his family to participate in the witness protection program until his death. They left the program because the witness protection program had them on the run for too long.

Mitch demonstrates his willingness and determination to solve problems for pro bono customers despite his dire financial situation when he is dealt the case of a high-school kid accused of murdering a classmate. Mitch was compelled by a benevolent judge to play the defense lawyer in a schoolyard killing. His idealism leads him to uphold his oath and ignore his client's innocence or guilt as well as his truthfulness. Once his client is released to his father's custody until the trial, Mitch experiences trials and tribulations such as a hit that is put out on the kid. Mitch has Ray be a fake hit man who solicits the hit after hearing the father of the slain student put the hit out.

At the end of the episode, Mitch engages in a business relationship with another firm.

== Production ==
Lucas performed several takes of the opening chase scene at the Lincoln Memorial on September 13, 2011.

== Reception ==
Los Angeles Times television critic Mary McNamara describes the pilot as "overstuffed with story and overburdened by the 20 years since the John Grisham novel was published". McNamara notes that despite the initial frenetic chase, the show gets mired in flashbacks and abundant story lines that it is burdened with to explain the current setting. Mike Hale of The New York Times considers the premiere to be uncoordinated: "In the premiere, unfortunately, the case of the week and the background story seem to be competing to see which can be sillier." Gail Pennington of the St. Louis Post-Dispatch complains that its attempt to be edgy is more often trite: "With its frantic pace, jumpy cameras and pounding soundtrack right out of a videogame loop, 'The Firm' is determined to prove right out of the gate how edgy it is. What it is, more often, is trite." David Wiegand of the San Francisco Chronicle notes that although the show has largely credible attention to details, the opening chase scene has one exception: "Reaching the edge of the Reflecting Pool, at the Capitol, Mitch steps over a low barrier and crosses the shallow water to the other side." Oddly the pursuers "...go all the way around the basin to try to head him off instead of running after him through the water..." Pennington notes that as the chase ends with him "leaping cartoonishly into the bed of a pickup. All that's missing is the truck careening into a fruit stand." Robert Bianco of the USA Today claims that "a show that opens with that kind of casual, incompetent stupidity is telling you how little effort it plans to expend on telling its story, and how little respect it has for your intelligence."

=== Ratings ===
"Pilot/Chapter Two" was seen by 6.32 million American viewers, and received a 1.4/3 Nielsen rating/share in the 18–49 demographic. The premiere episode earned the worst ratings in the history of NBC for an NBC regular season drama debut and "lost viewers with each succeeding half-hour".
