= Bodhi Tree Bookstore =

Independent bookstore in West Hollywood, California, US

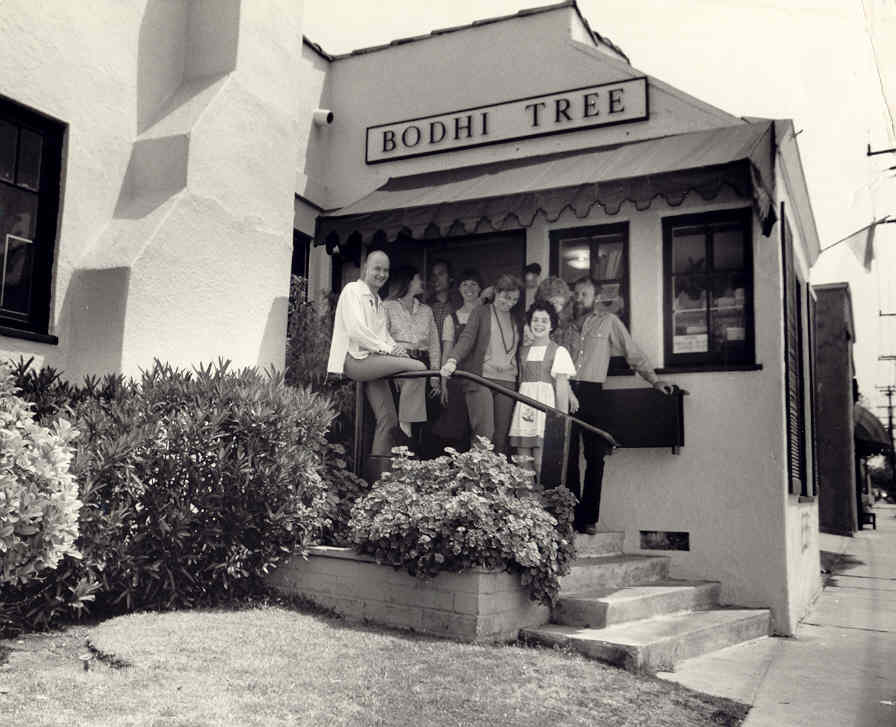
- Entryway to the Bodhi Tree Bookstore (1970s).
- Company type: Independent bookstore
- Founded: 1970
- Founder: Stan and Fran Madson; Dan and Marj Morris; and Phil and Elsa Thompson
- Headquarters: 8585 Melrose Avenue, West Hollywood, California, United States

The Bodhi Tree Bookstore, originally Bodhi Tree Book and Tea Shop, was an independent bookstore specializing in world religions, wisdom traditions, metaphysics, psychology, philosophy, and health. It opened in 1970 in Los Angeles, California (now West Hollywood, California). According to Buddhist tradition, the Bodhi Tree was the tree under which Siddhārtha Gautama sat in meditation until he attained enlightenment and became a Buddha. The motto of the bookstore was: "Books to Illuminate the Heart and Mind".

The bookstore became widely known through the 1983 book Out On A Limb by Shirley MacLaine and the subsequent eponymous 1987 television series. In her book, MacLaine declares that her "decision to visit an unusual bookstore [the Bodhi Tree Bookstore] was one of the most important decisions of my life". The Bodhi Tree Bookstore was on Melrose Avenue in West Hollywood, near the Pacific Design Center. The bookstore closed its physical location on December 31, 2011 and continued under new ownership as an online bookstore thereafter.

In May 1994, the bookstore and the co–owners received numerous commendations: the bookstore was named Business of the Year in 1994 by the West Hollywood Chamber of Commerce; the co–owners – Stan Madson and Phil Thompson – were both honored with Certificates of Recognition from the California State Senate – signed by California State Senator Tom Hayden – in recognition of their "extraordinary contribution of knowledge in art and spirituality and excellence in service to the city of West Hollywood and its citizens"; and the co–owners were named the 1994 Business Persons of the Year by the City of West Hollywood. The bookstore served as a community center for information about events, teachers, practitioners, and places for the spiritual community at large. It had the reputation of being "the spiritual heart" of Los Angeles, "the spiritual superstore, the grand central station for New Agers," and "L.A.'s premier New Age shop".

== Founding and early years (1970s) ==
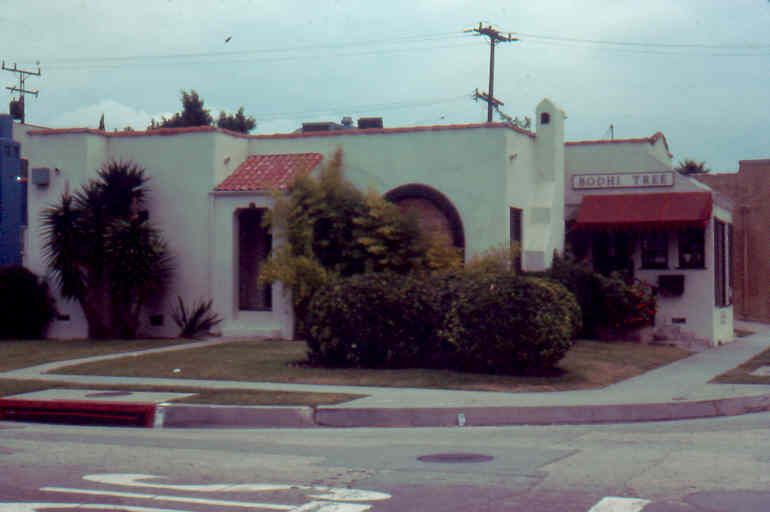
Exterior of the Bodhi Tree Bookstore as seen from Westbourne Avenue in the early 1970s.

The Bodhi Tree Bookstore was founded on July 10, 1970 by Dan and Marj Morris, Stan and Fran Madson, and Phil and Elsa Thompson. The original name of the bookstore was the Bodhi Tree Book and Tea Shop. When the bookstore incorporated in 1972, the name changed to the Bodhi Tree Bookstore.

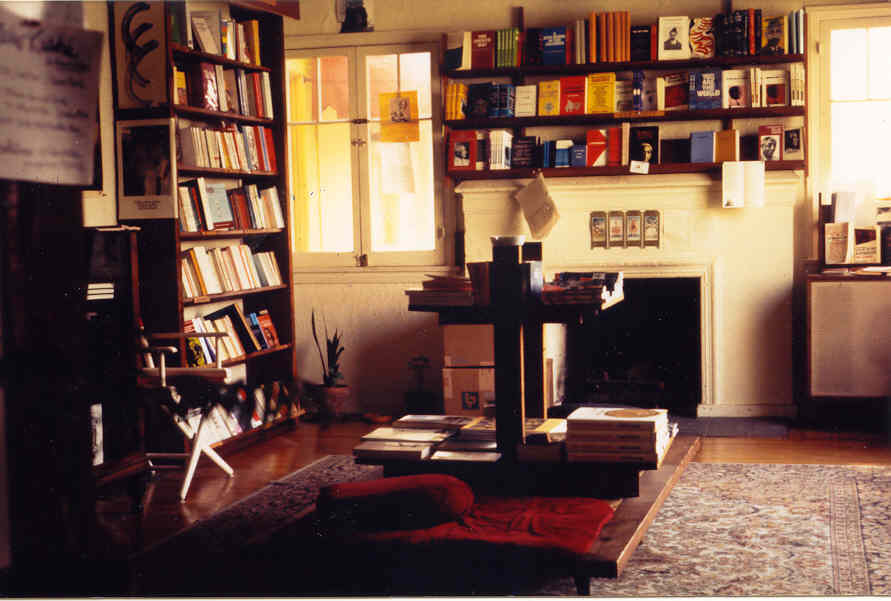
Interior of the Bodhi Tree Bookstore as it was circa 1970s.

In the 1970s in America, spiritual books were not readily available in most bookstores. The Bodhi Tree Bookstore gathered them together and made them accessible. The Bodhi Tree bookstore was located at 8585 Melrose Avenue, West Hollywood, CA. It was a stucco, flat–roofed building, originally a two–bedroom residence that had been converted into commercial property. The neighborhood was residential but Melrose Avenue itself was low key commercial, consisting of a number of one– or two–story buildings containing a variety of businesses, primarily antique shops.

Starting in 1971, the Bodhi Tree Bookstore featured a number of bookstore Tuesday and Sunday public events where authors, educators, spiritual leaders, or musicians would make presentations. On one evening, Nan Fuchs, the famous Herb Lady, spoke on Herbs and the Body. On another evening, D. W. Harding, author of On Having No Head, gave an informal lecture on the possibilities of losing one's own head (or ego). Another well-attended event was by Herb Soloman, who gave an introduction and demonstration of the Arica Work. Vimala Thakar gave a talk called Towards Total Transformation. Chӧgyam Trungpa made two public talks, The Battle of the Ego and The Open Way, at the Embassy Auditorium in downtown Los Angeles and presented a talk at the Bodhi Tree Bookstore. Maezumi Roshi, head of the Los Angeles Zen Center, presented Zen Buddhism in America: What is Zen in America Today and How Is It Practiced. The Yasutani Roshi (1885–1973) gave a dharma talk.

One of the founding members, Dan and Marj Morris decided to leave the bookstore for personal reasons. Stan and Fran Madson and Phil and Elsa Thompson formed the corporation "Bodhi Tree Bookstore, Inc." on November 30, 1972.

One of the earliest pieces of news coverage was an article called "Spellbinders for the Ancient Mystic Arts" by John Fleischman. The article reported on the rise of interest in the 'occult', 'esoterica', or 'mysticism' in the Los Angeles area, stating, "The Bodhi Tree Book and Tea Shop... is the city's key occult specialty bookstore." The February 1975 issue of Los Angeles Magazine featured an article by Devra Hill Zucker about "Romantic Places" in Los Angeles in which she included The Bodhi Tree Bookstore: "Three aerospace engineers converted this Spanish–style Melrose Avenue home into a bookstore with a strong Eastern bent. The Bodhi Tree embraces all directions of spiritual awakening and is also a place to read among plants and sip a complimentary herb tea." In 1976, a profile appeared in The Movement, published by Movement of Spiritual Inner Awareness. The author described the article as being, "about the people who created this sanctuary or book oasis in the middle of Los Angeles. Today, the Bodhi Tree can be considered one of, if not the main source of literature on consciousness, a term which extends from occult sciences and mysticism (East and West) to psychology, self-healing, tai chi, and more."

=== Bodhi Tree Used Bookstore (1975) ===
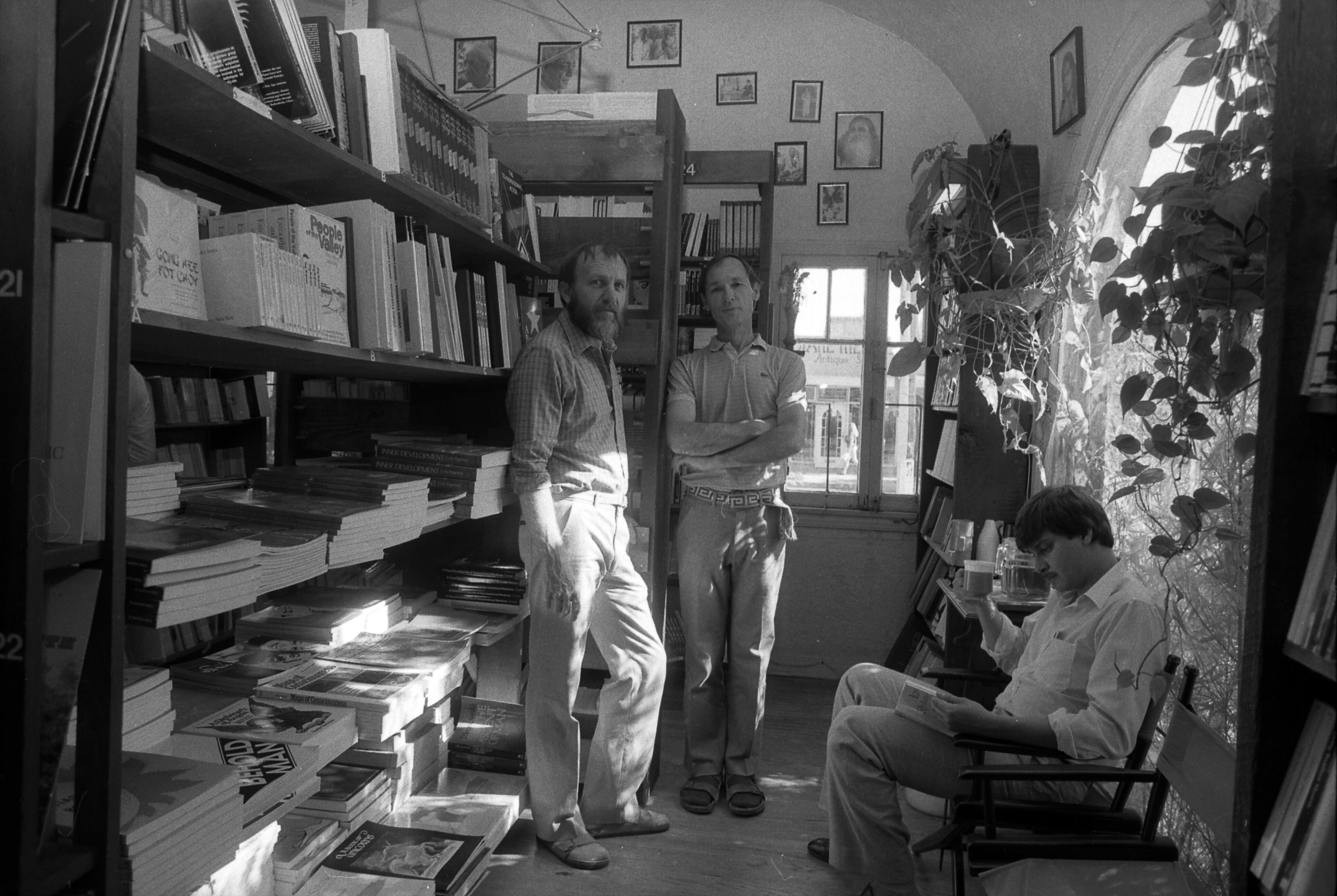
Owners Stan Madson (left) and Phil Thompson, 1981

In 1975, Areta Ferrell closed her clothing store next to the Bodhi Tree Bookstore, which then assumed the lease. On September 18, 1975, the bookstore opened its used books section.

The store developed into a prominent landmark within the spiritual community. It comprised four buildings: a New Books building on Melrose Avenue, a Used Books building on Westbourne Drive, and two storage buildings. In 1979, the property was purchased.

That same year, the Bodhi Tree Bookstore was listed in Brady & Lawless's Favorite Bookstores.

== Expansion and increased notoriety (1980s and 1990s) ==
The Bodhi Tree Bookstore was an information center for the spiritual community. In 1980, the booklet Bodhi Tree Directory: a Guide to Community Resources was published and updated yearly. The Bodhi Tree Directory grew to have over 51 subject areas and had a print run of 2,000 copies per issue.

In 1981, the Los Angeles Times published an article by John Dart, in which he wrote, "As a bookstore, the Bodhi Tree can be a sensuous experience, offering the taste of free herb tea, the sound of soft 'un-elevator' music, the chance to sit while book browsing, and the scent of incense. As a well–stocked 'New Age' way station, it provides a psychic rest stop between gurus or a simple refueling for the eclectic wisdom seeker. In this unofficial way-station role, the bookstore is also a sensory device (to blend metaphors) for picking up the direction of mystical–metaphysical traffic and the spiritual–speculative signal away from mainline religion."

A major remodel started in 1982, designed by architect Barry Gittelson. The project added significant floor space and a second story addition and improved the Used Book building. The two storage buildings were removed, opening up the rear area for parking. The remodeled result was a distinctive modernist rounded–edge rectangle with a big, round window facing Melrose Avenue near the entrance door, along with a pyramid skylight in the West wing.

In a small area to the rear of the bookstore, grew a Ficus religiosa (Bodhi Tree), given to the bookstore in the early 1970s by a neighbor who had raised it from a seed. By 2008, it stood at nearly three stories high.

Shirley MacLaine's book Out On A Limb discussed her experiences at the bookstore. A subsequent mini-series was filmed partially at the bookstore. Subsequently, the bookstore gained a local, national, and international identity and the number of customers increased dramatically. Many customers desired to explore the same subjects that inspired Shirley MacLaine.

=== Bodhi Tree Book Review magazine (1991–2002) ===
The bookstore published a book review magazine with the first issue appearing in late 1991. Bodhi Tree Bookstore staffers Dana LaFontaine and Mark Kenaston were the creators and first editors along with editorial assistant Mariam Angel. The magazine contained feature articles by noteworthy authors, best seller lists, and short reviews of recently published books, CDs, and video cassettes. The magazine started as a quarterly but eventually was published two times a year (semi-annually), in the spring and fall. At its peak, 40,000 copies of each issue were printed. About 50% were mailed out to customers and the other 50% given away to customers at the store. The first issues of the magazine featured interviews initiated by the editors, Mark Kenaston and Dana LaFontaine. A complete archive of the magazine is freely available online.

- Issue 1 (Fall 1991) contained an interview with the guitar duo of Strunz & Farah that give texture and shape to the sound of their world music.
- Issue 2 (Spring 1992) included a feature article that was an interview with Marianne Williamson.
- Issue 3 (Summer 1993) the feature article was an interview of Huston Smith by Mark Kenaston.

In 1993, Dana LaFontaine left the bookstore and Mark Kenaston assumed the role of head editor. The following year, Mark Kenaston departed and the primary editor of the book review became Stan Madson with co–editors James Culnan and Camilla Denton. Subsequent book reviews were written by staff (both current and former). Publication of the Bodhi Tree Book Review ceased with the Fall 2002 issue – Issue 28. (Note: The entire run of the publication has been made available by the publishers on Internet Archive - https://archive.org/details/bodhi-tree-book-review.)

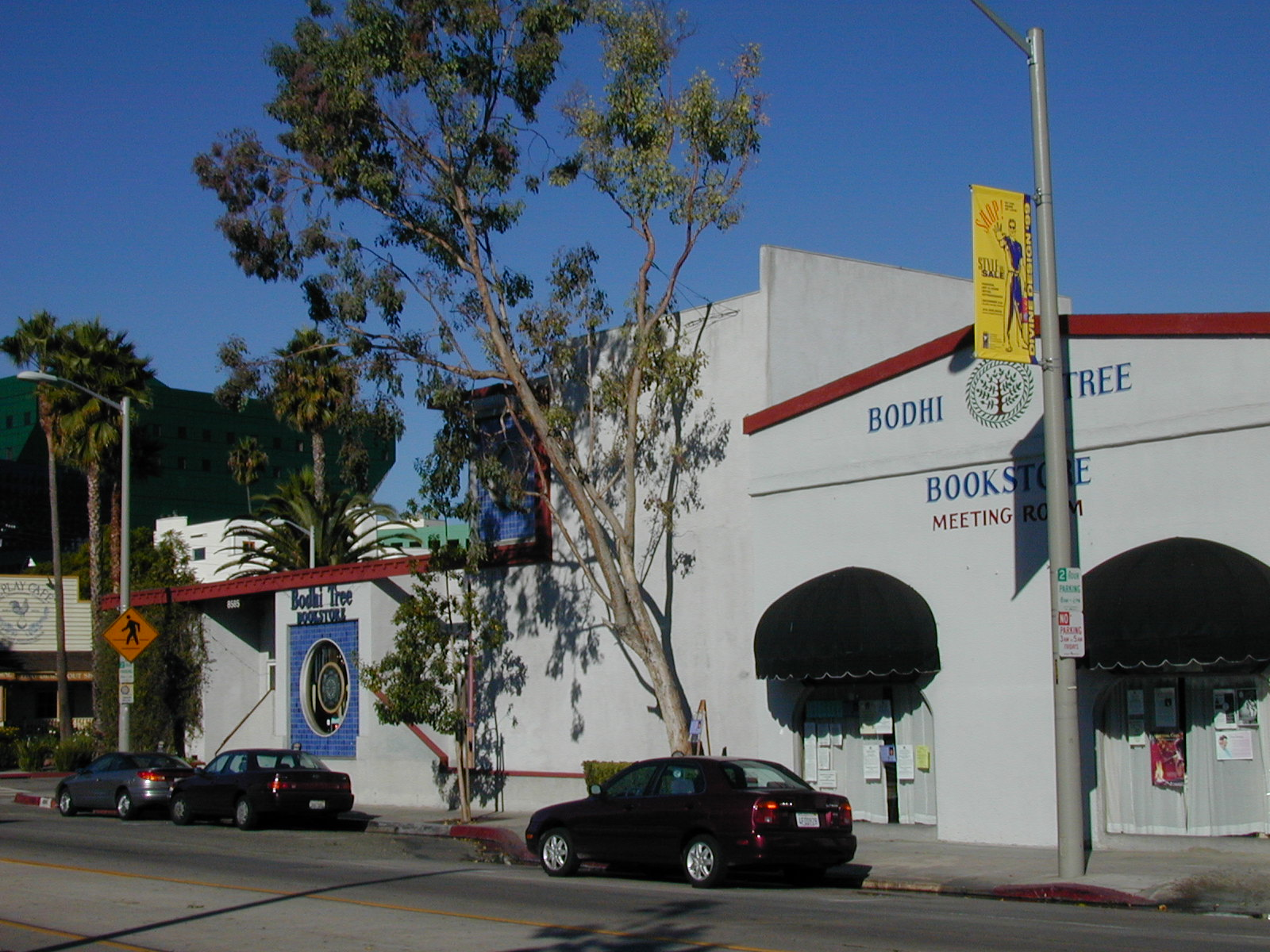
The front facade of the bookstore as seen from Melrose Avenue as it was after the remodel and renovations (circa 2000s). Depicted in this photo are the meeting room (on the right) and the store (on the left).

=== The Bodhi Tree Bookstore meeting room ===
In 1994, the bookstore acquired the adjacent storefront at 8383 Melrose Avenue. This building became a meeting room for author readings, book signing events, and a wide variety of workshops.

The Bodhi Tree Bookstore offered almost daily events or workshops in the Annex building. "The Artist’s Way Workshop" conducted by Kelly Morgan was a twelve-week lecture series, drawing on the work pioneered by Julia Cameron. The program, designed for creative people in all walks of life, integrated the spiritual path of the artist into ones daily routine using exercises and a supportive group to recover creative flow from excessive self–criticism, perfectionism, jealousy, limiting beliefs, addictions and other inhibiting blocks. Educator Roger Weir taught several cycles of his "Yoga of Civilization" (a 2-year long, weekly course). Weir was noted for his dynamic, broad–reaching cosmic lectures that ranged from the most esoteric spiritual teachings to the latest in scientific exploration while planting the seeds of dynamic personal transformation and nurturing self–education. The Krishnamurti Foundation of America conducted monthly workshops, starting in 2002. They explored the work of J. Krishnamurti, one of the most influential and independent spiritual teachers of the 1900s, by showing one of his archived talks followed by a dialogue discussion. Yudhishtara, the spiritual son of Poonjaji, an enlightened Indian master, conducted monthly meetings (Satsang) to a large group of devotees (typically 30 to 50 people) in the Bodhi Tree Bookstore meeting room. Sacred Poetry, produced by poet Doraine Poretz, presented reading performances of sacred poetry from a variety of traditions and eras of world spirituality.

Some of the notable authors who made book presentations at the bookstore were: Margot Anand, Ted Andrews, Stephen Batchelor, Harold Bloomfield, Julia Cameron, Mantak Chia, Paulo Coelho, Phyllis Curott, Nancy Cooke de Herrera, Guy Finley, Thom Hartmann, Andrew Harvey, Jamake Highwater, James Hillman, Lex Hixon, Jean Houston, Jon Kabat-Zinn, Rodger Kamenetz, Jonathan Kirsch, Thomas Laird, Terence McKenna, Michael Meade, Dan Millman, Robert Moss, Michael Murphy, Caroline Myss, Robin Norwood, Judith Orloff, Daniel Quinn, James Redfield, Layne Redmond, Malidoma Patrice Somé, Hyemeyohsts Storm, Frank Tipler, Kriyananda (J. Donald Walters), Andrew Weil, Roger Weir, and Marianne Williamson among numerous others.

=== Los Angeles area book fairs ===
The Bodhi Tree Bookstore was a founding and participating member of the Los Angeles Times Book Fair when it began in 1996 but ceased participating in 2008.

In 2002, the City of West Hollywood started a regional West Hollywood Book Fair, modeled upon the highly successful annual Los Angeles Times Book Fair. The Bodhi Tree Bookstore had a booth at the book fair until the physical bookstore closed at the end of 2011.

=== Bookstore cats ===
The Bodhi Tree Bookstore had a reigning cat for several years. The first holder of the crown was "Chubby", a large orange colored male cat. He joined the staff in the 1970s. The second reigning cat was "Little Girl", a friendly long-haired multi-colored cat. "Little Girl" was much admired. In 1998, LA Weekly's Best of LA identified "Little Girl" as number 2 for the Best Bookstore Cat. She was given the distinction as "the cat with the most karma."

== Expansion and maturity (2000s and beyond) ==
In 2000, the Bodhi Tree Bookstore became the official book supplier for Jim Strohecker's Health World Online. For a time, the Bodhi Tree Bookstore was designated to receive online orders, packaged and shipped orders, and took payment for Health World Online. (Note: Health World Online has gone through a few different names through the years but Jim Strohecker remains at the helm.)

For a few months in 2002, the bigger than life–size angel statues were sponsored and placed about Los Angeles. Each of them were hand–painted by individual artists. It was called A Community of Angels. One of the artists for the A Community of Angels 2002 project was Diane A. Curran who lived near the Bodhi Tree Bookstore and was a bookstore customer. Her painted angel statue was placed on the front porch of the Used Book Building where it remained for several months. It was named "Planetary Angel" and on its wings were cosmic symbols on a blue background.

In 2005, West Hollywood officially recognized the Bodhi Tree Bookstore as one of West Hollywood's oldest landmarks and a cultural treasure.

In 2009 the Bodhi Tree Bookstore was operating below financial break-even and had been experience a decline in sales for several years. It was about 40% less than peak sales in the late 1980s. Book sales were moving more and more to other retail establishments and to online booksellers such as Amazon. The Bodhi Tree Bookstore owners decided to retire.

The story about the sale of the bookstore property become widely known and within a few days, with articles appearing in the local press. The Los Angeles Times reported, "the store on Melrose Avenue, a mecca for spiritualist and philosophers since 1970 has been sold. Its owners hope to find someone to buy their inventory and reopen the store in a new location." The LA Weekly article pointed out that the history of the Bodhi Tree was, in a sense, a history of Los Angeles – modest store fronts became large glass fronted show rooms; Melrose Avenue became a destination drawing in both locals and tourists; the neighborhood became pricey; change was inherent and inevitable. For all things, there was a time for growth, for sustaining, then decline and transition. The Bodhi Tree Bookstore was still in business. until the end of 2011.

Many paid tribute to the bookstore. The July 2011 issue of Los Angeles Magazine contained an article by Dave Gadetta called "Bodhi Tree, the Bookstore that Enlightened New Age L.A., Readies For Its Final Exit". He described how the Bodhi Tree created a template for New Age browsing when it opened in the 1970s, spawning many similar New Age bookshops throughout Los Angeles and around the country.

The Los Angeles Magazine article was followed by another article in The Whole Person Calendar of Events in Southern California (July/August 2011) that surveyed the span and legacy of the Bodhi Tree Bookstore. Sharon Hall wrote, "Bookstores were a place where people of like minds could gather; they were a place where spiritual communities formed and strengthened. Now, after 40 years as proprietors of what may be the best known metaphysical bookstore in the country, the owners are retiring. The beloved Bodhi Tree is moving on to its next incarnation." Stan Madson was quoted as saying, "Things change. There’s the possibility that new energy will take it [the bookstore] in new directions – positive energy. There’s such a change in the world these days with the Internet and communications . . . even the New Age isn’t new age anymore . . . Change is important and it’s inevitable. It would be nice if things went on forever, but they don’t. Certain good things are disappearing or changing into something else. But what is out there is quite exciting and new."

Early in 2011, the Used Book building was closed. In December 2011, the physical bookstore entered its last month – closing on December 31, 2011. On the day of closing, the Los Angeles Times ran a front–page story about the closing of the bookstore by Teresa Watanabe. She wrote, "The cozy store on Melrose Avenue — with its incense, herbal teas and portraits of sages on the walls — has served as a spiritual mecca for seekers of all persuasions, including Jerry Brown, Ringo Starr and Shirley MacLaine. Its owners hope it can be reborn at a different location."

The new owner of the Bodhi Tree Bookstore business was Jasmine Fayad. The plan was to establish a new location and build on the look and sense of the old Bodhi Tree Bookstore. Eventually, plans for a new physical bookstore were abandoned in favor of developing an online presence. The new Bodhi Tree Bookstore continued as an online bookstore and extended its roots into digital and e–learning products with a line of educational courses.

== Publications ==
- Bodhi Tree Directory of Community Resources
- Basic Book List
- Bodhi Tree Book Review (published 1991–2002, twice a year, a total of 28 issues)
- Astrology Charts
- How To Run A Bookstore
- Hsin Hsin Ming Sengstan booklet
- Channeling and Mediumship–A Guide
- Crystals, Minerals, and Stones Reference List
- I Ching: How to Use
- Crystal, Mineral, and Gem Stones
- Ear Conning Instructions
- Incense: A Description of Incense and Fragrance List including How to Use
- Mala Stones & Beads
- Malas, Rosary, Prayer or Meditation Beads
