= Sticks and Bones (film) =

- Created by: David Rabe
- Based on: Sticks and Bones by David Rabe
- Screenplay by: Robert Downey Sr.
- Directed by: Robert Downey Sr.
- Starring: Tom Aldredge; Cliff DeYoung; Anne Jackson; Brad Sullivan
- Theme music composer: Jack Nitzsche
- Country of origin: United States
- Original language: English

Production
- Producer: Joseph Papp
- Editor: Bud S. Smith
- Running time: 105 minutes

Original release
- Network: CBS
- Release: August 17, 1973

Sticks and Bones is a television film adapted from the Tony Award-winning play of the same title by David Rabe. The black comedy focuses on David, a blind Vietnam War veteran who finds himself unable to come to terms with his actions on the battlefield and alienated from his family because they neither can accept his disability nor understand his wartime experience. Rabe explores the conflicted feelings of many civilians during the era by parodying the ideal American family as it was portrayed on the television sitcom The Adventures of Ozzie and Harriet. Beneath the perfect facade of the playwright's fictional Nelson family are layers of prejudice, bigotry, and self-hatred that are peeled away slowly as they interact with their physically and emotionally damaged son and brother.

Sticks and Bones was the second play in Rabe's Vietnam trilogy, following The Basic Training of Pavlo Hummel and preceding Streamers. A veteran himself, he wrote it while a graduate student at Villanova University, where it was staged in 1969. The off-Broadway production, directed by Jeff Bleckner, opened on November 7, 1971 at Joseph Papp's Public Theater, where it ran for 121 performances. The cast included David Selby as David, Tom Aldredge as Ozzie, Elizabeth Wilson as Harriet, and Cliff DeYoung as Rick.

In 1973, Robert Downey Sr. wrote the teleplay for and directed a CBS television film based on Rabe's play. The cast included DeYoung as David, Aldredge as Ozzie, and Anne Jackson as Harriet (for TV the parents were renamed "Andy" and "Ginger"). The subject matter was so controversial that 94 of the network's affiliates refused to broadcast the film.
