= Sticks and Bones =

Theatre play, a 1971 black comedy about a blind American Vietnam War veteran

- 1972 Broadway playbill cover
- Original language: English
- Written by: David Rabe
- Characters: David; Ozzie; Harriet; Rick; Zung; Sergeant Major; Priest
- Genre: Drama
- Setting: The Nelson family home Autumn 1968

Premiere
- Date: 1969, November 7, 1971
- Place: The Public Theater

Sticks and Bones is a 1971 play by David Rabe. The black comedy focuses on David, a blind Vietnam War veteran who finds himself unable to come to terms with his actions on the battlefield and alienated from his family because they neither can accept his disability nor understand his wartime experience. Rabe explores the conflicted feelings of many civilians during the era by parodying the ideal American family as it was portrayed on the television sitcom The Adventures of Ozzie and Harriet. Beneath the perfect facade of the playwright's fictional Nelson family are layers of prejudice, bigotry, and self-hatred that are peeled away slowly as they interact with their physically and emotionally damaged son and brother.

== History ==
Sticks and Bones was the second play in Rabe's Vietnam trilogy, following The Basic Training of Pavlo Hummel and preceding Streamers. A veteran himself, he wrote it while a graduate student at Villanova University, where it was staged in 1969. The off-Broadway production, directed by Jeff Bleckner, opened on November 7, 1971 at Joseph Papp's Public Theater, where it ran for 121 performances. The cast included David Selby as David, Tom Aldredge as Ozzie, Elizabeth Wilson as Harriet (played later by Rue McClanahan), Cliff DeYoung as Rick, and Charles Siebert as Father Donald.

Critical reaction and audience response were positive, and Papp decided to move the play uptown. With Drew Snyder replacing Selby but the rest of the cast intact, the Broadway production opened on March 1, 1972 at the John Golden Theatre, where it ran for 246 performances.

In 1973, David Rabe wrote the teleplay for and Robert Downey Sr. directed a CBS television movie based on Rabe's play. The cast included DeYoung as David, Aldredge as Ozzie, and Anne Jackson as Harriet. The subject matter was so controversial half of the network's affiliates refused to broadcast the film.

== Awards and nominations ==
Awards

- 1972 Tony Award for Best Play
- 1972 Tony Award for Best Performance by a Featured Actress in a Play (Elizabeth Wilson)
- 1972 Drama Desk Award for Outstanding Actor in a Play (Tom Aldredge)
- 1972 Drama Desk Award for Outstanding Director of a Play (Jeff Bleckner)
- 1972 Drama Desk Award for Outstanding Set Design (Santo Loquasto)
- 1972 Outer Critics Circle Award for Best Play

Nominations

- 1972 Tony Award for Best Direction of a Play (Jeff Bleckner)
- 1972 Tony Award for Best Performance by a Leading Actor in a Play (Tom Aldredge)

== Influence ==
The play was parodied by Christopher Durang in his 1977 play The Vietnamization of New Jersey.

== Revival ==
In 2014, Sticks and Bones was revived at The Pershing Square Center, with the production opening November 6. Directed by Scott Elliott, the production starred Bill Pullman and Holly Hunter as Ozzie and Harriet, with Ben Schnetzer as David and Richard Chamberlain as Father Donald.

In 2023, Sticks and Bones was revived by The Contemporary Theatre Boston, directed by Chris Cavalier and starring Dusko Petkovich as Ozzie Nelson.
