= Mitch McDeere =

- The Firm character
- First appearance: The Firm
- Created by: John Grisham
- Portrayed by: Tom Cruise (1993 film); Josh Lucas (2012 TV series)

In-universe information
- Full name: Mitchell Y. McDeere
- Gender: Male
- Occupation: Lawyer
- Spouse: Abby Sutherland
- Religion: Methodist

Mitchell Y. McDeere is a fictional character and the protagonist of John Grisham's 1991 novel The Firm. Mitch McDeere is a Harvard-educated tax lawyer who has a certified public accountant credential. He is also the husband of Abby McDeere, a Western Kentucky University–educated elementary school teacher. The character was portrayed by Tom Cruise in the 1993 film adaptation of the novel, and more recently by Josh Lucas for Entertainment One Television's sequel television show.

Mitch McDeere’s story picks up in Grisham’s 2023 novel The Exchange: After The Firm, which is set 15 years after the events in The Firm.

== General background ==
He is regarded as "an old-school, self-made hero" by Entertainment Weekly critic Melissa Maerz. The novel sold 7 million copies and the movie, which starred Tom Cruise, grossed over $158 million ($352 million in 2013 dollars) domestically and $111 million internationally ($270 million worldwide in 1993 dollars). Additionally, it was the largest grossing R-rated movie of 1993 and of any film based on a Grisham novel. The film was released while Grisham was at the height of his popularity. That week, Grisham and Michael Crichton evenly divided the top six paperback spots on The New York Times Best Seller list.

Both the novel and the film recount the story of an upstart attorney who was hired out of college by Bendini, Lambert & Locke, a small tax firm in Memphis that is really part of the white-collar crime division of an organized crime family's enterprise. After graduating third in his Harvard Law School class, he became a whistleblower to the Federal Bureau of Investigation and brought down both the firm and the crime family. The TV series begins as the McDeere family emerges from witness protection to encounter old and new challenges. The television show picks up on the story of McDeere and his family ten years after the events of the novel.

His father had been a coal miner and his mother was a waitress. In high school, Mitch had been a star quarterback with several scholarship offers. He injured his knee in his last high school game, and the only school that upheld its scholarship offer was Western Kentucky University. He matriculated and played quarterback as an infrequent starter, while making straight A's and earning a degree in accounting. He and his wife Abby were high school sweethearts who got married after they graduated from Western Kentucky. While Mitch was in law school, she taught kindergarten. They are Methodist. In the novel, he had driven a Mazda hatchback prior to being offered a BMW to work at Bendini. However, in the movie, Mitch and Abby are seen driving from Harvard to Memphis in a red 1983 Toyota Celica with a Boston University front plate, suggesting Mitch went to BU for his undergraduate degree; and is given a Mercedes by the firm. In the novel, his remarried mother lived in a trailer park in Panama City Beach, but he had been raised by his brother Ray.

== Critical response ==
=== Book ===
The character has an ambitious, go-getting nature. Marilyn Stasio of The New York Times describes him as 25 years old and fresh out of Harvard Law School.

=== Film ===
The Tyrone Power of his generation, Cruise hits notes of determination, all-nighter energy and gradually developing standards and smarts that he has hit before, particularly in most recent role, but one couldn't imagine anyone better for this sort of star turn except for Robert Redford 25 years ago.

— Todd McCarthy, Variety

The movie role is described as a highly sought-after, cocky, ambitious young Harvard law school grad by Joe Brown of The Washington Post that is not "just another variation on Cruise's patented young hot-shot roles of the past decade". However, Todd McCarthy of Variety says that Cruise's McDeere "could be a brother to his character in A Few Good Men", which had been released six months before. He also describes the character as sought-after. Owen Gleiberman of Entertainment Weekly notes that McDeere is "a brilliant, financially strapped Harvard Law School senior who dreams of working on Wall Street." Vincent Canby of The New York Times describes the character as "a bright young man, born poor and deprived, [who] lusts for the good things in life" and notes that he "...plays each side against the other in a manner that becomes increasing mysterious..." Roger Ebert of the Chicago Sun-Times describes McDeere as "...a poor boy who is ashamed of his humble origins now that he has graduated from Harvard Law fifth in his class." Empire's Matt Mueller describes him as "brash, grin-flashing hotshot, top in his Harvard law class and Wall Street-bound".

Brown described the role as one that Cruise was born to play: "Cruise was born to play company man, and the role is an opportunity to sum up his old roles and transcend them with his most potently emotional work." Gleiberman notes that Cruise uses "the sneaky-minded agility of a true conspiracy-buster". Ebert describes the natural fit of Cruise for this role: "One look at Cruise and we feel comfortable, because he embodies sincerity. He is also, in many of his roles, just a little slow to catch on; his characters seem to trust people too easily, and so it's convincing when he swallows the Firm's pitches and pep talks."

=== Television ===
The television character is consistently described as idealistic. The Hollywood Reporter's Tim Goodman describes Lucas' take as "more idealistic than eager", while Mike Hale of The New York Times also notes his "newfound storefront idealism". David Wiegand of the San Francisco Chronicle also describes him as an "idealistic lawyer" who "is a good lawyer and a good man".

Lucas' performance was repeatedly compared to Cruise's. Chris Lackner of The Gazette describes Lucas as a "less artificial, more nuanced, more credible version" of McDeere than Cruise. Los Angeles Times television critic Mary McNamara opines that Lucas' "...McDeere has no edge, neither the overweening ambition of the Tom Cruise version nor the bitter weariness one might expect to rise in its place after a decade on the run." Robert Bianco of the USA Today notes that Lucas is "...lost in a role that helped cement Tom Cruise as a movie star". Hale notes that Lucas' performance is composed of "a bland competence but not much fire".
