= Good for Otto =

Broadway plays

- Original language: English
- Written by: David Rabe
- Genre: Drama
- Setting: A rural mental health center

Premiere
- Date: 2015

Good for Otto is an American play by David Rabe.

== Plot ==
Dr. Michaels and fellow counselor Evangeline counsel six patients at a rural mental health center.

== Cast and characters ==
Off-Broadway	2018
Dr. Robert Michaels	Ed Harris
Evangeline Ryder	Amy Madigan
Timothy	Mark Linn-Baker
Frannie	Rileigh McDonald
Nora	Rhea Perlman
Mom	Charlotte Hope
Marcy	Nancy Giles
Denise	Lily Gladstone
Barnard	F. Murray Abraham
Alex	Maulik Pancholy
Jerome	Kenny Mellman
Jane	Kate Buddeke
Jimmy	Michael Rabe
Mrs. Garland/Teresa	Laura Esterman

== Critical reception ==
The Guardian awarded the play three stars out of five, calling it "Intimately staged yet strangely old-fashioned."

The Hollywood Reporter said in a review, "This shapeless play loses rather than gathers steam, ultimately seeming more like a docudrama patchwork with messy stitching than a satisfying, fully realized theatrical work."
