= Recital of the Dog =

1993 novel by David Rabe

- Author: David Rabe
- Publisher: Grove Press
- Publication date: January 1, 1993
- ISBN: 0-8021-1488-1

Recital of the Dog is a 1993 novel by American writer David Rabe. It is about a painter who kills his elderly neighbor's dog, then loses his grip on reality, descends into madness and begins behaving as if he were the neighbor's dog, leading him to commit a series of grisly murders.

== Plot summary ==
A painter becomes annoyed by a neighboring dog that's harassing his cows. One day, he shoots the dog and buries it in the woods. However, he takes pity on his neighbor, an Old Man who is miserable without the dog, believing it to have been kidnapped. The painter makes visits to the Old Man's home, in an attempt to keep him company, but when Old Man treats him sadistically, the painter soon finds himself impulsively acting like the Old Man's dog.

By the time the painter has returned home, he has so lost his sanity that he begins to suspect his wife of mistreating their 5-year-old son, Tobias. Planning a violent confrontation with his wife, he decides to prime himself by going on dates with various women, often murdering them. At times, he feels as though he is witnessing a mysterious male figure interrupting the crime scenes; this may be Death incarnate.

Having felt remorse about his earlier crime, the painter returns to the Old Man and confesses to having killed his dog. As a form of parity, the Old Man resolves to force the painter to kidnap his son, Tobias, and bury him alive inside a suitcase underground. After Tobias is buried alive, a fight ensues between the painter and the Old Man, ending with the Old Man getting killed in a car wreck. The painter immediately returns to the burial site and digs up Tobias, who, apparently, is still alive—but hysterical. The police show up and arrest the painter.

The painter is sentenced to be executed on the electric chair at Death Row. One of his last acts in life is to paint a self-portrait, on his cell walls, of himself with a dog's face, and the hair of his female victims. He looks forward to this, as he has inexplicably become cold on a constant basis, and believes that death by electrocution will provide him with warmth.

== Background ==
In a televised interview with Charlie Rose, Rabe explained that he got the idea for the story after a friend told him about having to deal with an acquaintance who'd shot his neighbor's dog.

== Reception ==
Publishers Weekly delivered a harsh review stating that the author's "attempt to show psychopathic derangement is boring and self-indulgent, and scenes of rape and child abuse may be too violent for many readers." And Kirkus agreed in their review commenting that the author's "clotted, self-indulgent prose renders that drama nonexistent."
