= Out on a Limb (book) =

1983 autobiography of Shirley MacLaine

- First edition
- Author: Shirley MacLaine
- Subject: Spirituality
- Genre: Non-fiction
- Publisher: Bantam Books
- Publication date: 1983
- ISBN: 0-553-24095-1
- OCLC: 10625894

Out on a Limb is an autobiographical book written by American film actress and dancer Shirley MacLaine in 1983. It details MacLaine's journeys through New Age spirituality. The book follows her from southern California to various locations including New York City, Europe, and Hawaii, culminating in a life-changing trip to the Andes Mountains in Peru. Central characters include David who is, according to MacLaine, a composite character; Gerry Stamford, a married man and fictionalized Labour member of the British House of Commons, with whom MacLaine claimed she had a love affair; and real-life close friend and politician, Bella Abzug.

The book received both acclaim and criticism for its candor in dealing with such topics as reincarnation, meditation, mediumship (trance-channeling), and even unidentified flying objects. It made Shirley MacLaine the butt of many jokes, especially by late-night television comedians. Once, when David Letterman would not let up on the New Age subject, she responded by saying, "Maybe Cher was right; maybe you are an asshole!" The claim about an affair with the MP gained attention in the UK when the book was published there.

Out on a Limb was adapted for television broadcast in 1987. The five-hour ABC miniseries starred MacLaine (as herself), John Heard as David Manning, and Charles Dance as Gerry Stamford. Anne Jackson played Bella Abzug, and Jerry Orbach played Shirley's agent. MacLaine kept a diary during the filming of the miniseries. The notes were later turned into the book It's All In the Playing.

After the publication the former President Jimmy Carter asked MacLaine to talk about UFOs.

...Looking back, I can say that making that simple, lazy afternoon decision to visit an unusual bookstore [the Bodhi Tree Bookstore in West Hollywood] was one of the most important decisions of my life.

— Shirley Maclaine (from Out on a Limb)
