= The Firm (2012 TV series) =

Television sequel to the book

- Genre: Legal drama; Thriller
- Created by: Lukas Reiter
- Based on: The Firm by John Grisham
- Starring: Josh Lucas; Molly Parker; Callum Keith Rennie; Juliette Lewis; Natasha Calis
- Countries of origin: United States; Canada
- Original language: English
- No. of seasons: 1
- No. of episodes: 22

Production
- Executive producers: John Grisham; John Morayniss; Michael Rosenberg; Noreen Halpern; Lukas Reiter
- Production location: Toronto
- Running time: 40–45 minutes
- Production companies: AXN Original Production; Shaw Media; Paramount Pictures; Lukas Reiter Productions; Entertainment One

Original release
- Network: NBC
- Release: January 8 – July 14, 2012

Related
- The Firm (novel); The Firm (1993 film)

The Firm is a legal thriller television series created by Lukas Reiter that began airing in February 2012 on AXN, and is a sequel to the 1991 John Grisham novel of the same name and its 1993 film adaptation. It was also picked up for first run syndication by Global in Canada and NBC in the US before release. The television adaptation is set ten years after the novel and film.

On February 3, 2012, NBC announced that the series would be pulled from its Thursday 10/9c slot immediately, and placed on Saturdays at 9/8c starting on February 18; Global continued to air the series at the former time slot until March 3, when the show was moved to Saturdays. AXN began broadcasts in over 125 territories and countries on February 19.

On May 13, 2012, NBC canceled the series after one season.

== Plot ==
The 2012 television show picks up on the story of Mitchell Y. McDeere and his family ten years after the fictional setting of the 1991 novel and 1993 film. In the original film and book, McDeere helped topple the Memphis law firm of Bendini, Lambert & Locke that protected a Chicago organized crime syndicate, resulting in mob convictions. The television adaptation attempts to remain true to the conspiracy element of its predecessors. Once McDeere is out of witness protection and building a new law firm, Kinross & Clark, a shady law firm, pushes to acquire McDeere's. Although McDeere's law firm is considered scrappy, he has become leery of being watched, which makes focusing on his job difficult. McDeere has a ten-year-old daughter Claire (Natasha Calis) and he begins the remaking of his career in the Washington Metropolitan Area. Mitch's brother and his brother's girlfriend work for his upstart law firm, which works out of a tiny former travel agency office. The first season revolves around a conspiracy and Kinross & Clark's interest in a McDeere client accused of murder. Throughout the season, the deceased mob boss' son contemplates seeking revenge on Mitch who was a cause of his father's prison term.

== Cast and characters ==
The following are the regular and recurring cast members in The Firm:

Regular

- Josh Lucas as Mitchell Y. "Mitch" McDeere, a Harvard-educated lawyer
- Molly Parker as Abigail Sutherland "Abby" McDeere, Mitch McDeere's blue-blood wife and an elementary school teacher
- Callum Keith Rennie as Raymond "Ray" McDeere, Mitch McDeere's ex-con brother and investigator
- Juliette Lewis as Tamara Inez "Tammy" Hemphill Ray McDeere's girlfriend and Mitch's secretary
- Natasha Calis as Claire McDeere, Mitch and Abby McDeere's daughter

Recurring

- Tricia Helfer as Alex Clark
- Martin Donovan as Kevin Stack
- Gianpaolo Venuta as Joey Morolto Jr.
- Shaun Majumder as Andrew Palmer
- Paulino Nunes as U.S. Marshal Louis Coleman
- Edward Glen as Duty Captain

== Production ==
=== Development ===
The concept of bringing these characters to television had been in the works for a few years with CBS having formerly been the expected network. Reiter conceived the recreation of the series 10 years into the future and proposed it to Grisham. Grisham oversaw the first three or four episode scripts and then became confident with its development.

Sony Pictures Television ordered 22 episodes of the show from Entertainment One Television in late April 2011 for broadcast on their AXN stations in 125 markets outside of Canada and the U.S. Shortly thereafter, NBC and Shaw Media confirmed that they had acquired broadcast rights in the U.S. and Canada respectively. The show's 22 episode order was the largest of any of NBC's newly picked up shows.

The show was filmed in Toronto and was produced by Entertainment One in association with Sony Pictures Television and Paramount Pictures. Filming of Season 1 took place between August 4, 2011 and April 30, 2012. The pilot was directed by David Straiton.

Grisham served as an executive producer of the television series. Lukas Reiter, a former Law & Order producer, wrote the pilot and was the showrunner. Some of the other legal shows he has produced are The Practice and Boston Legal. Other executive producers were Entertainment One's John Morayniss, Michael Rosenberg, Noreen Halpern, and Helen Shaver. The show's writers included Alyson Feltes, Peter Noah, David Feige, William Rothko, Vincent Angell, and Jonathan Shapiro.

On June 8, 2011, it was announced that Josh Lucas had been cast in the lead role of Mitch McDeere. On July 12, Entertainment One announced the casting of Callum Keith Rennie as Ray McDeere and Juliette Lewis as Tammy. The addition of Molly Parker as Abby McDeere was announced on July 29. Natasha Calis was cast as Claire McDeere, Mitch and Abby McDeere's daughter. Parker had previously played Calis' mother in the 2011 Lifetime film, Gone. Then, Tricia Helfer and Shaun Majumder were added in recurring roles as Alex Clarke and Andrew Palmer on August 19 and 22. As of 22 August 2011, the show was under production. Although mostly shot in Toronto, the production has included other host cities such as Washington, D.C. As of 3 November 2011, eight of the 22 episodes had been shot, according to Grisham.

On July 19, 2011, CBS filed a lawsuit against Reiter and Entertainment One "for tortious interference with contract, breach of contract, and breach of the implied covenant of good faith and fair dealing" because after CBS declined to commission a series from his script after paying him for it, Reiter reworked it, and Entertainment One agreed to produce it.

=== Background ===
Both the novel and the film recount the story of an upstart attorney who unknowingly was hired by an organized crime enterprise's legal team. He became a whistleblower to the Federal Bureau of Investigation and brought down the corrupt Memphis law firm with Chicago mob ties. The TV series begins as the McDeere family emerge from witness protection to encounter old and new challenges. The novel sold seven million copies. The film starring Tom Cruise grossed over $158 million ($352 million in 2025 dollars) domestically and $111 million internationally ($270 million worldwide in 1993 dollars). It was the largest grossing R-rated movie of 1993 and of any film based on a Grisham novel. The week the film was released, Grisham and Michael Crichton evenly divided the top six paperback spots on The New York Times Best Seller list.

In reporting about the television series, Bill Keveney of USA Today said, "The book ends with him [Mitch McDeere] on the run, his law career apparently over; the movie ends with him and his wife, Abby, on their way back to Boston, hoping for a new start in life and law." Keveney said that the television show more closely resembles the film in this regard. Mike Hale of The New York Times, however, notes that conflict with the mob "...doesn’t jibe with the film, which ended with his having reached a détente with them while avoiding witness protection." He does note that "It takes a couple of jarring, revisionist flashbacks in the first 10 minutes of the premiere to reconcile these details."

The Firm marks the third television adaptation of a John Grisham novel. The Client was a 1995 adaptation of the 1993 novel of the same name that aired 21 episodes on CBS between September 17, 1995, and April 16, 1996, during the 1995–96 United States television season. Grisham was not credited for the development of that adaptation. The Street Lawyer was a 2003 adaptation of the 1998 novel of the same name that never aired on ABC that was developed for the 2003–04 United States television season. The novel Ford County was also in development as an NBC series at one time.

== Episodes ==
No.	Title	Directed by	Written by	Original release date	US viewers (millions)	CAN. viewers (millions)
1	"Pilot"	David Straiton	Lukas Reiter	January 8, 2012	6.32	1.075
2	"Chapter Two"	David Straiton	Lukas Reiter	January 8, 2012	6.32	1.075
Mitch carries a briefcase as three men in suits chase him. Six weeks earlier, it is Mitch and Abby's daughter Claire's tenth birthday. She had been at her new school for half a year and was worried that some of the kids she invited would not come; The beginning of Mitch and Abby's lives through the witness protection program ten years ago is revealed; Joey Morolto died in prison nine months earlier, and now Joey Morolto Junior has been made the boss of the Morolto family; Tammy is irritated at Ray; Mitch confronts Sarah Holt, who is accused of murdering a 71-year-old woman in her sleep; Mitch defends 14-year-old Donnell Heywood, who is in the eighth grade, and was at school when the police say that he murdered classmate, Nathan Williams; a man comes to Mitch's office named Derek, a workmate of Richard, Nathan's father, and Derek tells Mitch and Ray that Richard offered him $10,000 to kill Donnell; Claire is worried that now she has friends, her parents would have to move; Mitch tries to get proof that Richard hired Derek to kill Donnell, so he sends Ray to pose as one of Derek's workmates bringing a tape recorder to get Richard to bring up the subject of the matter; in Chicago, Joey Morolto Junior discovers that the Mob knows how to find the McDeere family; Tammy tries to find a settlement in the Althea Sanderson case; Mitch decides to join the Clark & Kinross firm; six weeks later, security breaks down a hotel door after Martin Moxon jumped to his death.
3	"Chapter Three"	Helen Shaver	Lukas Reiter	January 12, 2012	4.23	0.835
Mitch defends Brian Strickland, whose girlfriend, Amy Sackheim, has gone missing and the police suspect that Brian is involved. The night Amy disappeared, she and Brian were on a date at a restaurant and he proposed, but she said no, which led to a loud fight at the public restaurant. Though it looks like Brian has done something, Mitch must prove his innocence; in class, Claire sees one of her popular classmates, Heather, cheating with answers on her arm. Heather notices and threatens Claire; a man named Clavin claims he killed Amy Sackheim; Sarah Holt is arrested for murdering Margaret Whitaker.
4	"Chapter Four"	Fred Gerber	Lukas Reiter & Peter Noah	January 19, 2012	3.42	0.825
Sarah Holt is surprised with an unexpected visit from Mitch, who questions her concerning Margaret Whitaker. Mitch defends a psychotherapist, Dr. Elle Larson, who is a suspect in the murder of Greg Tillman, her former patient who was very violent and obsessive, and was stalking her for quite some time. Mitch sees a man in the court room who strangely stares at Mitch and then leaves into the hallway. Ray suspects that Margaret's son killed Margaret Whitaker. Tammy is given Sarah Holt's laptop, but finds out when she turns it on that its files have been mysteriously erased.
5	"Chapter Five"	Sturla Gunnarsson	Lukas Reiter & Jonathan Shapiro	January 26, 2012	3.80	0.896
Abby and Mitch deal with the Althea Sanderson case and hope to show Andrew at Kinross & Clark a book Abby has been keeping for months, so that they can persuade them into a settlement higher that $210,000; Mitch defends Judd Grafton, a 25-year-old lawyer who opened an illegal casino instead of practicing his profession. He killed gangster Jimmy Riggs out of self-defense and he is innocent. Except Mitch does not have a clue what he is about to discover—Jimmy is a lot more innocent that everybody thinks; Ray believes that Sarah is hiding something, so he sneaks into her apartment; Tammy tapes together the shredded piece of paper Ray found in Sarah Holt's apartment, to find a list of the four previous nurses fired by Margaret.
6	"Chapter Six"	Helen Shaver	David Feige & Alyson Feltes	February 2, 2012	2.97	0.841
When a cab driver, Zoran Mirko, and his new wife celebrate the birth of their new baby at a nightclub, another patron insults Zoran's wife and Zoran started a fight and was thrown out. A few hours later, the club went into flames and a firefighter is hurt. If he dies, a murder charge would be on top of arson. Zoran claims to be innocent, but Zaron's prints were found on a paint thinner in the bathroom, and he is a suspect; Claire is upset because she wants a phone; Ray and Tammy go over the shredded paper Ray found in Sarah Holt's apartment that contains the list of Margaret Whitaker's four previously fired nurses; Abby must bring her class to a museum as a field trip and Claire goes missing; Joey Morolto discovers that the McDeere family is out in the open.
7	"Chapter Seven"	Holly Dale	Lukas Reiter & Jamie Gorenberg	February 9, 2012 (on Global); February 18, 2012 (on NBC)	2.73	0.592
Tammy discovers that Nate Murphy, the delivery kid from the deli down the street, had been arrested for murder and armed robbery along with two other people, so Mitch defends Nate in court, discovering the U.S. Attorney's office wants either Shawn (Nate's brother) or Nate to testify for the prosecution, being only one of them. The other brother must go down with Ed, who is the person who actually committed the murder; Abby cannot decide if she really wants to call her parents because of the last time they saw her—the time they boycotted Abby and Mitch's wedding; Abby plans Martin Moxon and Mitch to privately meet at a hotel to discuss the list of numbers that Moxon gave to Mitch, which leads Mitch to a dangerous chase, and a murder charge.
8	"Chapter Eight"	George Mihalka	Vincent Angell & William Rotko and Lukas Reiter	February 16, 2012 (on Global); February 25, 2012 (on NBC)	2.37	0.589
Mitch is cleared as a suspect in Martin Moxon's death and he discovers that the mysterious list containing unknown numbers is still left in his briefcase; Mitch contacts Sarah Holt, who is uncooperative with Mitch; Mitch must deal with a case concerning a CEO of a company working on a cure for Alzheimer's, who believes that his ex-girlfriend, who works for a rival company, stole his idea and was researching it for her company, stealing his work; Mitch unfolds a cover-up that Alex and Stack created; Tammy works on the list of numbers left behind from Moxon, discovering that they were switched when Mitch got the briefcase back.
9	"Chapter Nine"	Holly Dale	Lukas Reiter & Jonathan Shapiro	February 23, 2012 (on Global); March 3, 2012 (on NBC)	2.21	0.659
U.S. Army sergeant Leonard Debs confronts Ray and Mitch so that they can investigate his son Rashad's murder that he believes happened three days earlier. He went to the police to file a missing persons report, but he does not have his son's body to prove he is dead, but he is positive that Rashad is dead; Tammy lands a new job in order to help investigate further into the Sarah Holt case; Ray tells Mitch that he plans to propose to Tammy; Abby believes the story Mitch was told concerning Martin Moxon's life was a cover-up, so she befriends Moxon's wife, Danielle Moxon.
10	"Chapter Ten"	David Frazee	Ben Lee & Alyson Feltes	March 10, 2012	3.46	0.393
Mitch must defend a woman who is accused of kidnapping Tyler Kent, the son of a man who is confused when to determine who is the mother; Abby suspects that one her students, Kyle, is being abused by his parents. She believes that if she does not speak soon enough, then she could lose her job, until Kyle comes to her with persuasion from Claire, and Kyle tells her something even more shocking; Joey Morolto Junior's family thinks that he should have already killed Mitch for putting his father in prison, so one of their own goes after him, pushing him to set matters straight; Tammy discovers what the list of numbers that Moxon left behind meant—a list of numbers consisting of the patient numbers who died—one of them being Margaret Whitaker.
11	"Chapter Eleven"	Helen Shaver	David Feige	March 24, 2012	2.83	N/A
Mitch represents a death-row inmate who wants to help the family he wronged in an unusual way—by donating his heart—which causes problems in the case; Tammy inherits a house from a deceased aunt, which Ray immediately assumes that they were going to sell and keep Ray's apartment; developments in the Sarah Holt case unfold as Tammy and Abby try to contact the patient's families from the list that Martin Moxon gave to Mitch; Ray discovers that Sarah Holt was in the military after getting a confirmation from her ex-husband; Mitch is stuck in a hostage situation; Ray reveals to Tammy his cancelled plans for marriage; Mitch and the others learn that Kevin Stack is connected to Sarah Holt through the military.
12	"Chapter Twelve"	Kelly Makin	Lukas Reiter & Jamie Gorenberg	March 31, 2012	2.23	N/A
Spanning a two week time period, Mitch, Abby, Tammy, and Ray work hard to get to the bottom of the Sarah Holt case and what they discover is more than just Margaret Whitaker's murder—it is a group of hired serial killers all hired by a mysterious leader; Mitch must defend a man accused with burglary and attempted murder when his DNA are on the weapon and he claims he was not even at the scene; Abby talks to Martin's wife and discovers a secret safe deposit box with half a million dollars and files upon files of deceased patients; Tammy hires a hacker to recover the files on Sarah Holt's laptop; Ray spies on the two men who chased Mitch when Moxon died; Mitch finds the bug in his briefcase, handled by Kevin Stack; Sarah Holt turns up dead as Mitch discovers Kevin Stack heard their private conversation in prison; Andrew discovers Kevin Stack's next move to kill Mitch, and Andrew warns Mitch to leave his house; Mitch and his family along with Tammy and Ray escape Kevin Stack's people; Andrew sets Mitch to meet him at the first place they met.
13	"Chapter Thirteen"	Helen Shaver	Peter Noah	April 14, 2012	1.99	N/A
Mitch, Ray, and Tammy meet up with Andrew, at the place Mitch and Andrew first met. At first, they do not trust him, but eventually he convinces them. In the process, Abby and Claire are taken in with Witness Protection and brought to safety; Mitch, Ray, and Tammy work with a friend to try and convince the authorities of the conspiracy that is going on revolving around Kevin Stack. They attempt to steal a hard drive in Kinross & Clark with the help from Andrew. The hard drive is supposed to have evidence that can prove the conspiracy true, and Andrew must go at great lengths to help them steal the code to access the hard drive; Andrew tricks Kevin Stack into a phone call with Alex and gets peanut oil all over the phone—a substance Kevin Stack is allergic to. Kevin Stack has an allergic reaction and Andrew tries to get the code before he wakes up—and before Andrew could lose his life; in the end, the gang manages to get the hard drive, but Andrew is caught, Claire is in danger, and Abby is being kidnapped by one of Kevin Stack's people in an attempt to exchange Abby for the hard drive.
14	"Chapter Fourteen"	Lynne Stopkewich	Lukas Reiter & Jonathan Shapiro	April 21, 2012	1.74	0.406
Shaken by the fact that Abby has been kidnapped by Kevin Stack's men, Mitch begrudgingly makes a deal with him to trade key evidence in the Kevin Stack case to keep her safe. Mitch is all hands on deck when it comes to handing over the hard drive to Kevin Stack but Ray fools him during a switch and instead brings a decoy. A change in plans go way too far, when the FBI find Mitch and Ray with the hard drive. Little does Mitch know, it is a fake. Now, Ray and Mitch are in prison and while Abby is still abducted, a lawyer that Mitch previously begged to look into the case in which a conspiracy revolving around Kevin Stack involves mass murder and unexplained events. Now suspicious, this lawyer who Mitch sought help from discovers information about the hard drive which she believes is concrete evidence about what Mitch was talking about. But Mitch cannot say a thing—or Abby will take the fall. Alex eventually decides to be Mitch and Ray's lawyer and the FBI eventually discovers the hard drive is blank; in the process of everything, Claire is traumatized and worried as Abby faces torture before her death; in the end, Mitch and Ray are about to make the switch with Stack but Abby has already escaped.
15	"Chapter Fifteen"	Peter Wellington	Lukas Reiter	April 28, 2012	2.01	0.358
In the process of starting to make the switch, the hard drive for Abby's life, Mitch came to realization that Kevin Stack had not brought Abby. Fleeing from the setup, Mitch believes now that Abby is dead. Still in possession of the hard drive, Mitch gets a call from Louis, who tells him that Abby has been found. Mitch, Tammy, Ray, and Claire rush to her and find her sleeping. Mitch is the first one to see her awake. She is extremely traumatized from the experience of watching Stack call the order for Andrew's death, being treated as if she was drowning, and fearing for her life. With high levels of anxiety, Abby decides to wait until telling Mitch anything. Later in a conversation with Tammy, Abby reveals that it is better not telling Mitch about it because Abby says that Mitch finds these problems and will not let go of them, (and putting their family in danger), so Abby keeps quiet. In the meantime, the feds arrest Kevin Stack, and later, Alex is off the hook with no evidence linking to her, and then Kevin threatens Alex that if he goes down in prison, so will Alex. So Alex represents him in court and is good enough to release Kevin from a prison sentence. As one case closes, Louis tells Abby that she was a witness when Kevin Stack gave the order for Andrew's death, and so Louis starts up another case as Mitch uncovers this. He hugs Abby as she does not look so happy....
16	"Chapter Sixteen"	Lee Rose	Lukas Reiter	May 5, 2012 (on Global); May 12, 2012 (on NBC)	2.19	0.445
When Abby takes the stand in the government's case against Kevin Stack, her testimony becomes the only thing that can keep him behind bars. Determined to make sure Stack does not evade justice, Mitch learns all the details of his master plan. After a probable cause hearing for the murder of Andrew Palmer, in which it is ruled that probable cause does indeed exist, Kevin Stack escapes from a holding cell by impersonating a guard. While walking outside, Mitch notices something is not right about the guard and calls after Stack, who takes him hostage. Stack explains his reasoning for planning the Noble Conspiracy: terminal care patients sapped Noble's finances, driving co-pays up for such necessaries as prenatal care, forcing indigent mothers to go without, leading to a higher prenatal death rate. Broken men from the U.S. Army Medical Corps—Stack's own unit—found a reason to live again. Stack was willing to sacrifice the one to save the hundred in his mission to save money for Noble. When a soldier requests permission to kill Mitch, Stack refuses, reiterating that he, and his unit, only kill to save. As the police storm the hangar where Mitch is held hostage, Kevin Stack commits suicide.
17	"Chapter Seventeen"	David Straiton	Alyson Feltes & Ben Lee	May 12, 2012 (on Global); May 26, 2012 (on NBC)	2.46	0.326
Mitch takes Abby and Claire to the train station from where Abby and Claire leave for Kentucky to visit Abby's parents. While exiting the train station, Mitch finds an innocent young girl named Jenny Lafleur being charged with solicitation, so he takes the case and agrees to be her lawyer. Little does he know that she holds a dangerous secret; Ray asks Tammy to marry him and she accepts. Tammy later finds that her ex-husband Elvis never signed the divorce papers, so she tells Ray that she must fix things and get Elvis' signature, while Ray discovers that the ring he got from his friend in prison is having some trouble keeping his theft a secret, so Ray tells Tammy he needs it back for a better proposal. Alex is fired from her position at Kinross & Clark thanks to a piece of evidence from Mitch proving she was involved with Kevin Stack. Abby's mother suspects that Abby is having trouble in her marriage, so Abby stands up for herself claiming that is false. In the process, it is revealed that Abby has been taking drugs for the past 10 years in Witness Protection and is still presently doing so. At the end of the episode, Mitch calls Abby as Abby does not answer.
18	"Chapter Eighteen"	Holly Dale	Lukas Reiter & Jamie Gorenberg	May 19, 2012 (on Global); May 26, 2012 (on NBC)	2.21	N/A
Mitch defends a neurotic, reclusive novelist Henry Kettle, who is charged with murdering his sister Margaret; back in Kentucky, Maxine invites Abby and Claire to go to the dance at the community center and they accept the invitation. Abby meets Benjamin Wilson, Abby's mother's therapist. Abby stands her ground in staying away from Ben, knowing that he has a thing for her but, slowly and eventually, she gives in and she and Ben end up kissing. Mitch does not know a thing, and this has made things worse for the communication flow between Mitch and Abby; Mitch finally wins and gets Henry free of the charge because they caught the real killer. At the end of the episode, Mitch is about to leave the office when someone comes in. He assumes it is going to be Ray, but it is Joey Morolto. Expecting Joey wants revenge for the prison sentence of his father, Mitch is surprised to find that instead of Joey killing Mitch, Joey wants to hire him.
19	"Chapter Nineteen"	David Straiton	Lukas Reiter & Peter Noah & Jonathan Shapiro	May 26, 2012 (on Global); June 23, 2012 (on NBC)	2.20	N/A
Joey Morolto gives Mitch an offer he cannot refuse – if Mitch defends his best friend from a murder charge, the McDeeres and the Moroltos will be square; as Abby tries to save her mother's charity from a crooked accountant, she makes an unexpected realization about herself.
20	"Chapter Twenty"	Lynne Stopkewich	Lukas Reiter & Jamie Gorenberg & Vincent Angell	June 9, 2012 (on Global); June 30, 2012 (on NBC)	2.56	0.317
A young lady accuses Patrick Walker of rape, and Mitch must defend him against these charges. Eventually, he learns that the accusation was all part of Joey's ploy to remove the district prosecutor from the case. Mitch saves Joey's life after one of Joey's hunchos goes rogue and hires someone to shoot Joey.
21	"Chapter Twenty-One"	Holly Dale	Peter Noah & Andrew Matisziw & Katie Swain	June 16, 2012 (on Global); July 7, 2012 (on NBC)	2.24	0.349
Mitch starts choosing the jury for Patrick Walker's case. Joey, scared of being exposed as the leader of the Mob, refuses to take the stand to assist his friend's defense that he was framed for the murder by Joey's consigliere. A flash-forward two days into the future gives clues on who killed the woman that Walker is accused of killing.
22	"Chapter Twenty-Two"	Helen Shaver	Lukas Reiter	June 30, 2012 (on Global); July 14, 2012 (on NBC)	1.72	0.285
Tammy and Ray's wedding is cut short when Mitch is kidnapped by a member of Russian mob, the one whom Mitch suspects of having killed Charlotte. The mobster does not kill Mitch; he only intends to scare him—by pushing him off a cliff and into the water below. Meanwhile, the Russian mob has plans to kill a top American diplomat; the mobster who pushed Mitch off the cliff is actually an informant for the FBI. What is more, the FBI is willing to allow Walker to take the fall for Charlotte's death in order to protect their source. Meanwhile, Mitch makes progress in the courtroom. He interrogates the detective who allowed Walker to smoke during his interrogation, accusing him of using Walker's DNA to frame Walker for Charlotte's murder. In McDeere's living room, Mitch's US marshal friend tells him about the FBI's plans with the Russian mob ... the McDeeres will have to go against the Russians and the FBI to win their case. The camera transitions from the McDeere's living room to Joey sitting at a table drinking then to Mitch six weeks later fleeing a building with a briefcase.

== Broadcast ==
In May 2011, it was announced that in the United States, The Firm would air during the 2011–12 network television season on Sundays at 10:00 pm. It was intended to premiere as a 2012 mid-season replacement following The Apprentice. However, in November 2011, it was announced that in the United States, The Firm would air on Thursdays 10:00 pm. It premiered as a 2012 midseason replacement following Up All Night, taking over the time slot from Prime Suspect. It premiered with a two-hour special on Sunday January 8, 2012 before debuting in its regular one-hour time slot on January 12. The premiere drew NBC's worst ratings in the key advertising demographic ever for a regular season drama debut. On February 3, 2012, NBC announced that The Firm was being rescheduled to Saturdays at 9/8c, with its original Thursday 10/9c slot being taken by Awake.

In Canada, the show premiered on January 8 and was shown in simulcast with NBC for the first six episodes. With the acquisition of Awake, Shaw has moved The Firm to Saturdays at 10:00 pm on Global, beginning with "Chapter 10" on March 10, 2012. The Firm repeats on Showcase on Friday night, Saturday morning and night, as well as morning and night of the following Tuesday. The series is also shown Sundays on Mystery TV.

With its debut on February 19, The Firm marks the first time that AXN has premiered a show on the same day in all of its markets. The AXN broadcast broadens the shows markets to over 125 territories and countries across Africa, Asia, Latin America, Central Europe, Germany, Italy, Japan, Portugal, Russia, and Spain. Worldwide distribution is handled by Entertainment One, who owns the basic and pay television, broadcast television, and digital/DVD rights for the show outside of AXN markets.

On March 17, 2012, the show was pre-empted by the new NBC reality show Fashion Star for one week. On May 4, 2012 NBC announced on the show's Facebook page that they were delaying episode 16 until May 12 due to the holiday Cinco de Mayo. Episode 16 was broadcast in Canada on May 5, resulting in NBC being one week behind the Canadian broadcast.

In May 2012, it was confirmed that NBC would not be continuing with the show beyond the one season.

As of 2021, the series is currently being heavily promoted by Scottish Television (STV) for its STV Player service.

== Ratings ==
Season	Network	Timeslot (ET/PT)	# Ep.	Premiered		Ended		TV Season	Rank	Viewers (in millions)
Season	Network	Timeslot (ET/PT)	# Ep.	Date	Premiere Viewers (in millions)	Date	Finale Viewers (in millions)	TV Season	Rank	Viewers (in millions)
1	Global	Thursday 10:00 PM (January 12, 2012 – February 23, 2012); Saturday 10:00 PM (March 10, 2012 – June 30, 2012)	22	January 8, 2012	1.075	June 30, 2012	0.285	2011–12	TBA	TBA
1	NBC	Thursday 10:00 PM (January 12, 2012 – February 2, 2012); Saturday 9:00 PM (February 18, 2012 – May 26, 2012); Saturday 10:00 PM (May 26, 2012 – July 14, 2012)	22	January 8, 2012	6.32	July 14, 2012	1.72	2011–12	#135	4.36
1	AXN	Time varies by location	22	February 19, 2012		TBA		2012	TBA	TBA

== Reception ==
The series received an approval rating of 39% on review aggregator Rotten Tomatoes, based on twenty three reviews, its consensus reads, "A typical, old-fashioned legal crime show, The Firm grows tedious from the first episode." Prior to its initial airing, Entertainment Weekly critic Melissa Maerz gave the show a B rating, stating that "For a supposed update, The Firm sometimes feels like a relic from a bygone era." However, she notes that McDeere is "an old-school, self-made hero" that you can't help rooting for and that The Firm is a "straightforward, one-man-against-the-system story" of "the scrappy, Everyman lawyer fighting against Big Corruption" that is naturally compelling. The Hollywood Reporter's Tim Goodman describes the show as "a solid if unspectacular story about one of the most unlucky lawyers ever depicted on television" and uses the phrase "Average ... as a Television Series" in the review title. Los Angeles Times television critic Mary McNamara presents arguments that the show has low prospects for success: "It isn't the flashbacks or muddled storytelling, the liberal white moralizing or ridiculous inconsistencies that threaten to deep-six 'The Firm,' it's the washed-out sepia tone of the legal thriller itself." McNamara does not totally dismiss the possibility that Reiter, the man she says "all but invented the legal thriller derivative", may be able to mold this show into what she calls a "solid procedural hybrid", but questions the demand for such a show in the face of The Good Wife and Damages. Hale complains that the television show is not self-contained: "...if you haven’t seen the film (or read the John Grisham novel on which both are based), the TV show will be especially bewildering." He also complains that the weekly plot "...is notably slight and unbelievable, even for a TV legal drama." While giving 1.5 out of 4 stars, Robert Bianco of the USA Today claims that the show "is part weekly procedural, part season-long conspiracy, and wholly unsatisfying" and notes that it would not let a chance to present a clichéd moment slip by.

While giving the show two stars, Gail Pennington of the St. Louis Post-Dispatch says "'The Firm' is tedious but not terrible; whether it will be watchable depends, one, on how much you like legal procedurals and, two, how the ongoing McDeeres-in-jeopardy plot is handled in future episodes." By way of comparison, she describes the show as "Harry's Law minus all charm" and as a show that "really wants to be Damages circa 2007". She also notes that because of the financing deal, the show is unlikely to be cancelled before the 22-episode run is completed.

Not all the reviews were negative. David Wiegand of the San Francisco Chronicle describes the show as "old-fashioned" in a good way. He speaks highly of things ranging from retro opening credits that he described as slick to the payphone that he mentions as if it is quaint. He also notes that the characters incorporate "nods to classic thrillers of the past" in a manner that is "in keeping with that old-fashioned element that wafts through the show". Wiegand considers the unusual 22-episode investment a safe one because "The cast is appealing and the story line is not only compelling but also deals with fascinating moral complexities."
