= Empath =

Concept in popular psychology

In psychology, empaths (/ˈɛmpæθ/; from Ancient Greek ἐμπάθ(εια) (empáth(eia)) 'passion') are people who have a higher than usual level of empathy, called hyperempathy. While objective empathy level testing is difficult, tests such as the EQ-8 have gained some acceptance as tests for being empathic. Highly sensitive person is also often synonymous, but is used to describe sensory processing sensitivity as well.

The term empath is sometimes used in a broader sense to describe someone who is more adept at understanding, i.e. is more sensitive to the feelings of others than the average person; or as a descriptor for someone who is higher on an empathetic "spectrum" of sorts.

The term also refers to a concept in parapsychology, wherein the mechanism for being an empath is said to be psychic channeling. Psychics and mediums often say that they channel the emotional states and experiences of other living beings, or the spirits of dead people, in the form of "emotional resonance". Studies of such claims have found them to be the result of mundane empathy and charisma, with no actual supernatural capabilities involved.

== Neurology ==
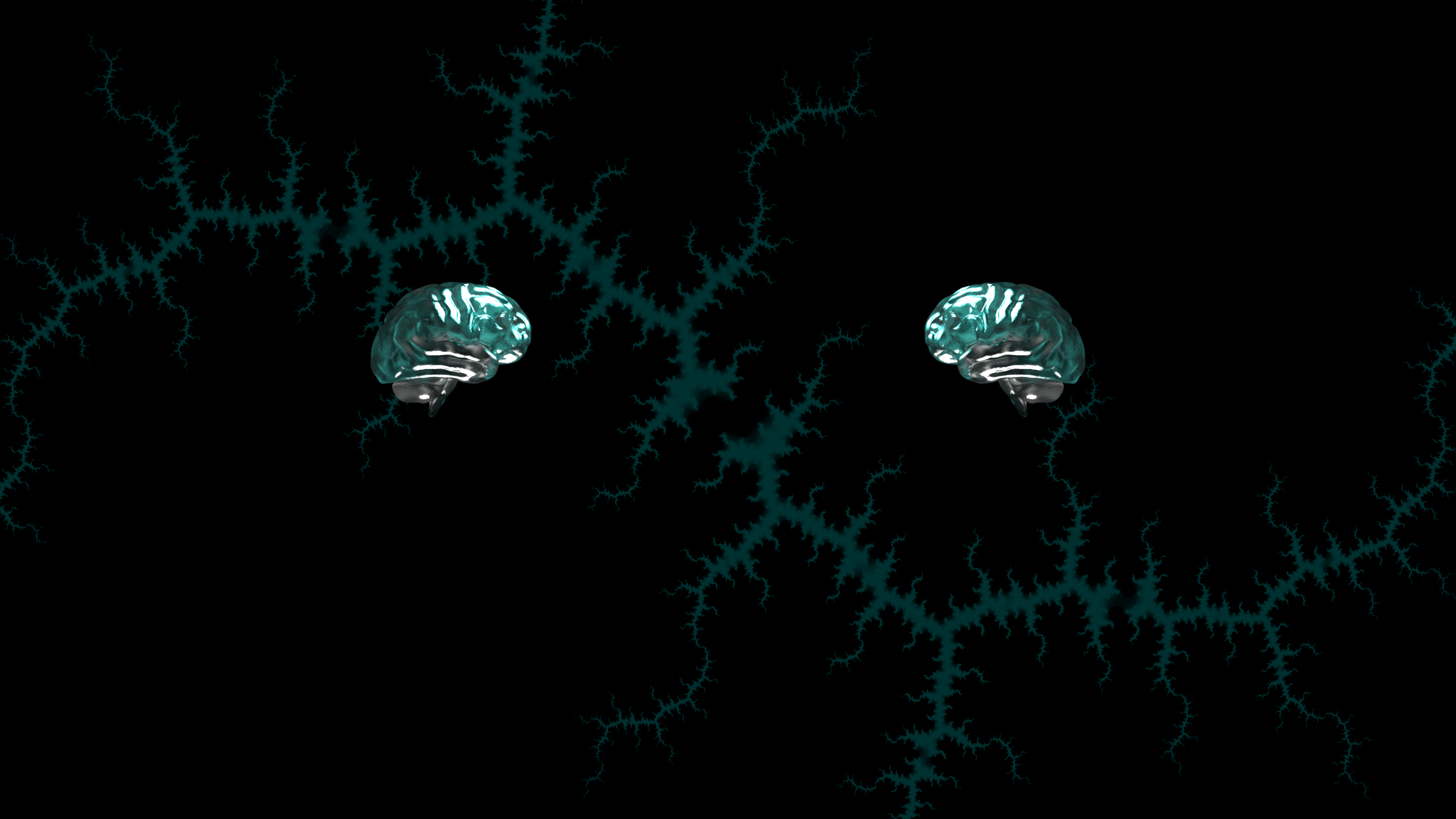
An artistic interpretation of mirror neurons, the overactivity of which is a possible explanation for hyperempathy, active in two human brains

Neuroscientists have found evidence to suggest that some people have greater or lesser ability to share and feel the emotions of others. Mirror neurons are neurons that fire both when an animal acts and when the animal observes the same action performed by another. Interfering with the level of activation of mirror neurons via transcranial magnetic stimulation (TMS) has been experimentally studied.

== Other concepts ==
=== Dark empath ===
"Dark empath" is a proposed term for a person who has elevated antagonistic or "dark" personality traits, and is able to imagine and understand other people's mental state and emotions. They may use that skill to manipulate others and further their own goals. The concept was first proposed by Nadja Heym, and is related to the so-called dark triad traits. The concept differs from "affective empathy", when one person can feel what another person is feeling.

Heym and her colleagues use the term to describe individuals who appear to have elevated empathic capacities alongside their callous, manipulative and antagonistic nature. In their study, which included 991 participants, the researchers identified four key personality groups or profiles: traditional Dark Triad (DT) individuals, who have high dark traits and low empathy; Dark Empaths, who share high dark traits but also have high empathy; Empaths, who have high empathy and low dark traits; and Typicals, who have average empathy and low dark traits. Overall, the study suggests that Dark Empaths are a distinct group with a mix of positive and negative traits, showing that high empathy does not necessarily make someone less capable of having dark, manipulative and aggressive tendencies.

Adler University professor Jason Walker describes dark empaths as able to charm others but that they see relationships as transactional; they are able to understand the hopes and dreams of others, but will use that information for personal gain or to withhold support in crucial moments. Walker states that they will guilt-trip others and act passive-aggressively, and that dark empaths can adopt multiple roles in a relationship, adjusting their behavior to benefit themselves, thus displaying inconsistency in character.

== Paranormal usage ==
The term's paranormal usage flows mostly from the work of American psychiatrist Judith Orloff. Orloff uses the term to describe people who have an innate ability to read the emotional state of others. She believes that empaths are able to sense the thoughts, feelings and energy of those around them, and that they are able to use this ability to provide healing or comfort to others, if they manage their condition correctly.

Orloff's work is controversial, as she says that she is a clairvoyant (psychic). Her definition and classification of types of empaths is not recognized by mainstream psychiatry, nor is it included in the DSM-5. For her part, Orloff believes her psychiatric colleagues to be "stuck in the Dark Ages".

Two studies focused on such claims of telepathy have found them to be the result of mundane empathy and charisma, not supernatural capabilities.

== In popular culture ==
Online, self-describing empaths are sometimes mocked for using the moniker. Shane Dawson was mocked for using the term to describe himself after a poorly-received apology YouTube video in 2018.

Empaths have also featured in various works of fiction, such as the Marvel Comics character Empath Forest Whitaker's character Dan Smithson in Species (film) (1995) and the Star Trek: The Next Generation character Deanna Troi. The concept is further explored in Star Trek: The Original Series, Season 3, Episode 12, titled "The Empath".

== See also ==
- Artificial empathy
- Empathy-altruism
- Empathy gap
- Mirror-touch synesthesia
- Pathological altruism
