= David Rabe =

American playwright and screenwriter (born 1940)

- Born: David William Rabe; March 10, 1940 (age 86); Dubuque, Iowa, U.S.
- Education: Villanova University, MA
- Spouses: Elizabeth Pan (m. 1969; div. 1974); Jill Clayburgh (m. 1979; died 2010)
- Children: 3, including Lily
- Writing career
- Notable awards: Tony Award for Best Play, 1972 (Sticks and Bones); Obie Award for distinguished playwriting, 1973 (The Basic Training of Pavlo Hummel); National Institute and American Academy Award in Literature, 1976; Guggenheim Fellowship, 1976; PEN/Laura Pels Award Master American Dramatist, 2014

David William Rabe (born March 10, 1940) is an American playwright and screenwriter. He won the Tony Award for Best Play in 1972 (Sticks and Bones) and also received Tony Award nominations for Best Play in 1974 (In the Boom Boom Room), 1977 (Streamers) and 1985 (Hurlyburly).

== Early life ==
Rabe was born on March 10, 1940, in Dubuque, Iowa, of German and Irish descent, the son of Ruth (née McCormick), a department store worker, and William Rabe, a teacher and meat packer. He was raised in a devout Catholic family.

== Career ==
Rabe was drafted into the U.S. Army in 1965 and served in a medical unit during the Vietnam War. After leaving the Army in 1967, Rabe returned to Villanova University, studying writing and earning an M.A. in 1968.

During this time, he began work on the play Sticks and Bones, in which the family represents the ugly underbelly of the seemingly stereotypical Nelson family (whose names match the main characters of the sunny 1950s television series—Ozzie, Harriet, David and Ricky) when they are faced with their embittered and hopeless son David returning home from Vietnam as a blinded vet.

Rabe is known for his loose trilogy of plays drawing on his experiences as an Army draftee in Vietnam, Sticks and Bones (1969), the Tony Award-winning The Basic Training of Pavlo Hummel (1971), and Streamers (1976), the latter of which was included in Harold Bloom's Western Canon.

He also wrote Hurlyburly (both the play and the screenplay for the film version), and the screenplays for the Vietnam War drama Casualties of War (1989) and the film adaptation of John Grisham's The Firm (1993). Rabe also wrote a screenplay for First Blood for producer Martin Bregman with Mike Nichols interested in directing and the role of John Rambo written for Al Pacino, but it was not filmed because Pacino found it "too extreme" and declined to appear in it.

A collection of Rabe's manuscripts is housed in the Mugar Memorial Library, at Boston University.

== Awards and honors ==
- 1967 Rockefeller Foundation Grant
- 1970 Associated Press Award, for a series on Daytop addict rehabilitation program
- 1971 Obie Award for distinguished playwriting for The Basic Training of Pavlo Hummel
- 1971 Drama Desk Award for The Basic Training of Pavlo Hummel
- 1971 Elizabeth Hull/Kate Warriner Award from Dramatists Guild for The Basic Training of Pavlo Hummel and Streamers
- 1972 New York Drama Critics Circle Special Citation for Sticks and Bones
- 1972 Outer Critics Circle Award for Best Play in 1972 for Sticks and Bones
- 1972 Tony Award for Best Play in 1972 for Sticks and Bones
- 1974 Tony Award nominee for Best Play for In the Boom Boom Room
- 1976 National Institute and American Academy Award in Literature
- 1976 Guggenheim Fellowship
- 1977 Tony Award nominee for Best Play for Streamers
- 1977 New York Drama Critics' Circle Award for Best American Play for Streamers
- 1985 Tony Award nominee for Best Play for Hurlyburly
- 2014 PEN/Laura Pels International Foundation for Theater Award Master American Dramatist

== Works ==
=== Plays ===
- Chameleon (1959)
- The Basic Training of Pavlo Hummel (1971)
- Sticks and Bones (1971)
- The Orphan (1972)
- In the Boom Boom Room (1973)
- Burning (1974)
- The Crossing (1975)
- Streamers (1976)
- Goose and Tomtom (1982)
- Hurlyburly (1984)
- Those the River Keeps (1991)
- A Question of Mercy: Based upon the Journal by Richard Selzer (1997)
- The Dog Problem (2001)
- The Black Monk (2004)
- An Early History of Fire (2012)
- Good for Otto (2015)
- Visiting Edna (2016)

=== Screenplays ===
- I'm Dancing as Fast as I Can (1982)
- Streamers (1983)
- Casualties of War (1989)
- State of Grace (with Dennis McIntyre, 1990)
- The Firm (with Robert Towne and David Rayfiel, 1993)
- Hurlyburly (1998)
- In the Boom Boom Room (adapted from his play, 1999)

=== Fiction ===
- Recital of the Dog (1993)
- The Crossing Guard (novelization of the screenplay by Sean Penn, 1995)
- A Primitive Heart (2005)
- Dinosaurs on the Roof (2008)
- Mr. Wellington (children's book, illustrated by Robert Andrew Parker, 2009)
- Girl by the Road at Night: A Novel of Vietnam (2010)
- Listening for Ghosts: A Novella and Four Short Stories (2022)
