= Judith Orloff =

American psychiatrist and clairvoyant

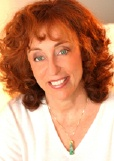
- Born: June 25, 1951 (age 75); Philadelphia, Pennsylvania, U.S.
- Education: University of California, Los Angeles (BS); University of Southern California (MD)

Judith Orloff (born June 25, 1951) is an American board-certified psychiatrist, self-claimed clairvoyant (psychic), and the author of five books.

== Early life and education ==
Orloff was born in Philadelphia, Pennsylvania, to Jewish parents Theodore and Maxine Orloff, both of whom were physicians. Her family includes many physicians. She grew up in Beverly Hills, where she later said that she had experienced strong intuitions as a child.

Orloff earned her Doctor of Medicine (M.D.) degree from the University of Southern California in 1979. She completed a medical internship at Wadsworth Veteran's Hospital in Los Angeles in 1980 and held a psychiatric residency at the UCLA Neuropsychiatric Institute from 1979 to 1983.

== Career ==
Orloff held staff positions at hospitals in the Los Angeles area (Cedars Sinai Medical Center, St Johns Medical Center, the Daniel Freeman Hospital, and Brotman Medical Center). She opened a private practice in Los Angeles in 1983. She has taken part in what she calls "intuitive research" projects with Thelma Moss, Mobius Group and the Institute of Noetic Sciences, and is a member of the American Psychiatric Association and the Southern California Psychiatric Society. Orloff is an assistant clinical professor of psychiatry at UCLA, and leads workshops on the relationships between medicine, intuition, and spirituality.

Orloff published her first book, Second Sight, in 1996. The Publishers Weekly review said "Orloff's unconventional attempt to bridge the worlds of Freud and the paranormal will appeal to open-minded readers." In her book, Orloff claims to have second sight, and uses the term energy psychiatry to describe her novel psychotherapy model. She also claims to have worked with police departments using her psychic abilities. In 2001, Second Sight was named in testimony before the United States Senate Special Committee on Aging as an example of "irresponsible unscientific work". An updated edition was published by Three Rivers Press in 2010 with a revised subtitle: An intuitive psychiatrist tells her extraordinary story and shows you how to tap your inner wisdom. Orloff has written three more books; her 2009 Emotional Freedom is a New York Times bestseller that has been translated into 15 languages.

Orloff has spoken at medical schools, hospitals, the American Psychiatric Association, Fortune magazine's Most Powerful Women Summit; and at alternative and traditional health forums such as National Alliance for the Mentally Ill in Los Angeles, Columbia Presbyterian Hospital Medical Center in New York, the UCLA Pediatric Pain Program in Los Angeles, and the Maria Shriver's First Lady's Women's Conference also in Los Angeles. She formerly published a blog on The Huffington Post's HuffPost Contributor platform.

== Bibliography ==
- Second Sight. Warner Books. 1996. ISBN 978-0-446-51842-0.
- Dr. Judith Orloff's Guide to Intuitive Healing. Three Rivers Press. 2001. ISBN 978-0-8129-3098-6.
- Positive Energy: 10 Extraordinary Prescriptions for Transforming Fatigue, Stress, and Fear into Vibrance, Strength, and Love. Three Rivers Press. 2005. ISBN 978-1-4000-8216-2.
- Emotional Freedom: Liberate Yourself from Negative Emotions and Transform Your Life. Random House. 2009. ISBN 978-0-307-33819-8.
- The Power of Surrender: Let Go and Energize Your Relationships, Success, and Well-Being. Harmony Books. 2015. ISBN 978-0-307-3382-11.
- The Empath's Survival Guide. Sounds True. 2017. ISBN 1683642112.
