= The Firm (1993 film) =

American legal thriller film by Sydney Pollack

- Theatrical release poster
- Directed by: Sydney Pollack
- Screenplay by: David Rabe; Robert Towne; David Rayfiel
- Based on: The Firm by John Grisham
- Produced by: Scott Rudin; John Davis; Sydney Pollack
- Starring: Tom Cruise; Gene Hackman; Jeanne Tripplehorn; Ed Harris; Holly Hunter; Hal Holbrook; David Strathairn
- Cinematography: John Seale
- Edited by: William Steinkamp; Fredric Steinkamp
- Music by: Dave Grusin
- Production companies: Davis Entertainment; Scott Rudin Productions; Mirage Enterprises
- Distributed by: Paramount Pictures
- Release date: June 30, 1993
- Running time: 154 minutes
- Country: United States
- Language: English
- Budget: $42 million
- Box office: $270.2 million

The Firm is a 1993 American legal thriller film directed by Sydney Pollack, and starring Tom Cruise, Jeanne Tripplehorn, Gene Hackman, Ed Harris, Holly Hunter, Hal Holbrook, David Strathairn and Gary Busey. The film is based on the 1991 novel by John Grisham.

Released by Paramount Pictures on June 30, 1993, the film was a major commercial success, grossing $270.2 million against a budget of $42 million, making it the highest-grossing film adapted from a Grisham novel and the fifth highest-grossing and the highest-grossing R-rated film of 1993. It received generally positive reviews for the performances (particularly from Cruise and Hunter), although the screenplay received some criticism. Hunter received a nomination for the Academy Award for Best Supporting Actress, while the soundtrack by Dave Grusin received a nomination for Best Original Score.

== Plot ==
Mitch McDeere, a top Harvard Law School graduate, accepts a lucrative offer from Bendini, Lambert & Locke, a small boutique law firm of forty-one lawyers in Memphis, Tennessee that also takes a great interest in the notions of family. After relocating to Memphis with his wife Abby, a schoolteacher, Mitch prepares for the bar exam. Senior partner Avery Tolar mentors Mitch on the firm's strict culture of loyalty, confidentiality, and high fees. In addition to the high-figure salary and guaranteed increase after the first year of employment, the firm's benefits include a new house with a low interest-rate mortgage, a new Mercedes-Benz complete with choice of color, and paid-off student loans; Mitch, who managed to work his way up from a poor family, is dazzled by his apparent good fortune, but Abby, who has had a more privileged background, resents the firm's meddling in employees' personal lives. On the day of a social visit to the house of Mitch's friend and colleague Lamar Quinn, the McDeeres are tearfully informed by Lamar's wife Kay that two of the firm's associates have been killed in an explosion whilst scuba-diving during a work trip to the Cayman Islands; during the drive home, Abby voices her belief that Kay seemed "scared".

Mitch's determination and enthusiasm, along with the demands from the firm, result in him working grueling hours, straining his marriage. Under Avery's guidance, Mitch discovers the firm's primary work involves helping wealthy clients hide money in offshore shell corporations and other questionable tax-avoidance schemes. During a nighttime study period at a cafe, Mitch is unnerved by FBI Agents Wayne Tarrance and Thomas Richie, who voice their observations about the recent deaths resulting in four dead lawyers over a ten-year period, and all under the age of forty-five: as the agents leave, Tarrance tells Mitch that they will probably see him again soon. At the funeral, Avery, whose marriage is in ruins, meets Abby for the first time and develops an attraction to her. Abby notices Avery's apparent lack of grief about the recent deaths, to which Avery responds by telling her that people grieve in different ways.

During his first work trip to the Caymans with Avery, Mitch overhears client Sonny Capps mentioning how the firm's Chicago associates "break legs". At the firm's condominium, he finds documents linked to the four deceased lawyers. Returning to the condo ahead of Avery after attending an outdoor party, Mitch witnesses a woman on the beach apparently being harassed by her boyfriend, and after the other man flees the woman seduces Mitch into having sex. After returning from the Caymans, Mitch turns to help from his brother Ray, who is in prison for manslaughter and whose existence Mitch did not acknowledge to the firm during his interview: at his suggestion, Mitch hires Ray's former cellmate and freelance private investigator Eddie Lomax to look into the associates' killings, but Lomax is murdered shortly afterwards by two hitmen, witnessed by his secretary and lover Tammy Hemphill. Meanwhile, the firm's security chief, Bill DeVasher, drives Mitch to an undisclosed location and uses incriminating photos of his one-night stand in the Caymans to blackmail him into silence.

Impressed by Mitch's handling of Capps in the Caymans, Avery persuades the senior partners to send him to a seminar in Washington instead of Lamar. Mitch is then informed of Lomax's murder by Tarrance, and is directed to meet FBI Director F. Denton Voyles at the Lincoln Memorial Reflecting Pool. Voyles reveals to Mitch that BL&L's top client is the Morolto crime family of the Chicago Outfit, and most of the firm's lawyers are involved in tax fraud and money laundering; Voyles further warns Mitch that his home is bugged and his phonelines are tapped, and pressures him to provide evidence against the firm and the Moroltos. Mitch realises he is in a no-win situation: cooperating with the FBI will not only result in having to be placed in witness protection but also being disbarred from practicing law ever again, as acquiring the necessary evidence for the FBI will involve Mitch violating his sworn oath to attorney–client privilege; not cooperating will result in Mitch going to prison along with the other members of the firm, and walking away is not an option due to the murdered associates having tried and failed to do so themselves. Upon his return to Memphis, Mitch tells Abby what he has learned. and tells her that they have to carry on behaving in a way that will not arouse any suspicions. Tammy then arrives in Memphis and tells Mitch the details about Lomax's murder, including descriptions of the two hitmen. Mitch then confesses his infidelity to Abby, who plans to leave him and return to her parents after giving her notice to the school.

Dealing with a disgruntled client, Mitch discovers the firm regularly overbills its hours, a form of mail fraud that exposes them to RICO charges. Mitch meets with Terrance at a greyhound racetrack and agrees to cooperate for $1.5 million and his brother Ray's release from prison. The FBI release Ray and transfer half the money to a Swiss bank account. The FBI secretly intend to return Ray to jail after Mitch provides the incriminating files. Assisted by Tammy, Mitch begins to copy the billing records, but needs additional files from the firm's Cayman condo. Avery changes his scheduled visit to the Caymans, jeopardizing Mitch's plan. Under the pretence of Avery's earlier offer to accompany him to the condo during a goodbye visit to her school, Abby flies out to the Caymans herself, insisting to Tammy that she does not tell Mitch; she subsequently seduces and drugs Avery to get the files. The firm's phone tap records Abby warning Tammy, leading DeVasher's hitmen to pursue them. After Abby copies the files, a groggy Avery comes to and tells her that the woman who seduced Mitch on the beach was a prostitute used as part of a set-up by the firm. He warns Abby to leave and is later killed by DeVasher's hitmen, staging his death as a bathtub drowning.

Mitch's plans are compromised when a prison guard on the Moroltos' payroll tips off DeVasher about Ray's transfer to FBI custody. Alerted by Tarrance, Mitch is forced to retreat through downtown Memphis, pursued by DeVasher and his Nordic hitman. A lengthy footchase leads to a derilect building where DeVasher mistakenly shoots the assassin and Mitch beats DeVasher unconscious. Mitch then meets with the visiting Moroltos at the Peabody Hotel, presenting himself as a loyal attorney who uncovered the illegal overbilling. He asks for permission to turn over their invoices to help the FBI prosecute the firm, but assures them that any information about their legal affairs remains protected by attorney–client privilege, likening himself to "a ship carrying a cargo that will never reach any port". The Moroltos reluctantly guarantee Mitch's safety, and he hands over the evidence to the FBI.

Back at his home, which had been ransacked by the firm, Mitch is confronted by Tarrance, who is angered by his decision to work with the Moroltos, but Mitch reminds him that the evidence supports a RICO case against the firm's senior members. Having provided the FBI with the necessary evidence and maintained his professional integrity without violating his oath, Mitch is able to resume his legal career. Abby returns as Tarrance leaves, and Mitch admits to her that his not disclosing the full extent of his plan was borne out of concern for her safety and the knowledge that she needed to leave; Abby says that while she will tell Mitch what happened in the Caymans "someday", she uses the tragic nature of Avery being "pretty decent... and corrupt, and ruined, and so unhappy" as an indication to the road that Mitch was heading down. The reconciled McDeeres return to Boston in their old car, wondering if they will make it, and during the end credits Ray, now with Tammy, is shown enjoying his new life in the Caymans with the money Mitch obtained for him.

== Cast ==
- Tom Cruise as Mitch McDeere, a promising recent Harvard Law graduate
- Jeanne Tripplehorn as Abby McDeere, Mitch's wife
- Gene Hackman as Avery Tolar, Mitch's mentor at the Firm
- Holly Hunter as Tammy Hemphill, Eddie's secretary and lover who aids Mitch in copying and stealing the files in Memphis and the Cayman Islands
- Ed Harris as FBI Agent Wayne Tarrance, the agent in charge of the investigation into the Firm; Mitch's primary contact with the FBI
- Hal Holbrook as Oliver Lambert, senior partner at the Firm
- Jerry Hardin as Royce McKnight, managing partner at the Firm
- David Strathairn as Ray McDeere, Mitch's brother who was in jail for a manslaughter conviction
- Terry Kinney as Lamar Quinn, Mitch's friend who works at the Firm
- Wilford Brimley as Bill DeVasher, officially the head of security at the Firm—unofficially the Firm's main hitman
- Sullivan Walker as Thomas Abanks, the owner of a scuba diving business
- Gary Busey as Eddie Lomax, a private investigator and former cell-mate of Ray McDeere
- Barbara Garrick as Kay Quinn, Lamar Quinn's wife who befriends both Abby and Mitch
- Steven Hill as FBI Director F. Denton Voyles
- Margo Martindale as Nina Huff, Mitch's secretary
- Paul Sorvino as Tony Morolto
- Joe Viterelli as Joey Morolto
- Jerry Weintraub as Sonny Capps
- Tobin Bell as The Nordic Man, Morolto Hitman
- Dean Norris as The Squat Man, Morolto Hitman
- Karina Lombard as the prostitute on the beach who seduces Mitch
- John Beal as Nathan Locke
- Paul Calderon as FBI Agent Thomas Richie

== Production ==
Paramount Pictures initially budgeted the film at $15 million with Charlie Sheen or Jason Patric considered for the lead with a scheduled release date of Christmas 1992. However, producers Scott Rudin and John Davis wanted it to be a bigger production and talked to Tom Cruise on the set of A Few Good Men, who indicated that he wanted to star and direct. With the release date at risk, Rudin and Davis were given one week to sign a director and signed John Badham for $3 million. Soon after, John McTiernan expressed an interest in directing with Cruise starring, which the studio was keen on; however, McTiernan wanted Rudin removed as producer. Paramount Communications president Stanley Jaffe decided to keep Rudin, so McTiernan went off to make Last Action Hero and Jaffe brought in Sydney Pollack.

Principal photography took place from November 9, 1992, to March 20, 1993, and though it was primarily filmed in Memphis, Tennessee, including a chase scene on the Mud Island Monorail. Some scenes were filmed in Marion, Arkansas, and the Cayman Islands.

The film's soundtrack is almost exclusively solo piano by Dave Grusin.

Gene Hackman's name did not appear on the film's release poster. Hackman joined the film late, when it was already well into production, because the producers had originally wanted to change the gender of the character and cast Meryl Streep, until author John Grisham objected and Hackman was eventually cast. Tom Cruise's deal with Paramount already stated that only his name could appear above the title. Hackman also wanted his name to appear above the title, but when this was refused, he asked for his name to be removed completely from the poster.

This is also the final film for Steven Hill and John Beal.

== Release ==
=== Theatrical ===
The film was released while Grisham was at the height of his popularity. That week, Grisham and Michael Crichton evenly divided the top six paperback spots on The New York Times Best Seller list. It opened on June 30, 1993, in 2,393 theatres, and landed at #1 at the box office, grossing $25.4 million over the 4th of July weekend. It remained in the #1 spot at the box office for 3 weeks. After 12 weeks in theatres, the film was a huge success, making over $158 million domestically and $111 million internationally ($270 million worldwide). Additionally, it was the largest grossing R-rated movie of 1993 and of any film based on a Grisham novel.

The Firm was one of two films released in 1993 that were adapted from a Grisham novel, the other being The Pelican Brief.

=== Home media ===
The film was released on VHS in December 1993, with the cassettes specially made of blue plastic. It was released on LaserDisc in the United States on December 16, 1993, in both widescreen and pan and scan formats. The DVD was released on May 23, 2000. The special features include only the teaser and theatrical trailers. A Blu-ray edition was released on September 11, 2012. A 4K UHD version was released on June 20, 2023.

== Reception ==
=== Critical reception ===
On Rotten Tomatoes, the film holds an approval rating of 77% based on 60 reviews, with an average of 6.40/10. The site's critics consensus states: "The Firm is a big studio thriller that amusingly tears apart the last of 1980s boardroom culture and the false securities it represented." Metacritic, which uses a weighted average, assigned the film a score of 58 out of 100, based on 16 critics, indicating "mixed or average" reviews. Audiences polled by CinemaScore gave the film an average grade of "B+" on an A+ to F scale.

Roger Ebert gave The Firm three stars out of four, remarking: "The movie is virtually an anthology of good small character performances. [...] The large gallery of characters makes The Firm into a convincing canvas [... but] with a screenplay that developed the story more clearly, this might have been a superior movie, instead of just a good one with some fine performances."

The film earned some negative reviews as well, notably from James Berardinelli, who said that "[v]ery little of what made the written version so enjoyable has been successfully translated to the screen, and what we're left with instead is an overly-long [and] pedantic thriller." Grisham enjoyed the film, remarking: "I thought [Tom Cruise] did a good job. He played the innocent young associate very well."

=== Awards ===
The film earned two Academy Award nominations including Best Supporting Actress for Holly Hunter (losing to Anna Paquin for The Piano, though she did win an Oscar at that year's ceremony for Best Actress in the same film as Paquin) and Best Original Score for Dave Grusin (losing to John Williams for Schindler's List).

== In other media ==
In April 2011 Entertainment One announced that a sequel to The Firm was being produced with Sony Pictures Television and Paramount Pictures. The series picked up the story of Mitch and his family ten years after the events of the novel and film. The first season was 22 episodes long and began production in Canada in July 2011. In May 2011, NBC confirmed that they had acquired the U.S. broadcast rights to the show and that they planned to début it in January 2012. The show was cancelled after its first season.
