= The Exchange: After The Firm =

2023 novel by John Grisham

The Exchange
- Front cover
- Author: John Grisham
- Language: English
- Genre: Legal thriller
- Publisher: Doubleday
- Publication date: October 17, 2023
- Publication place: United States
- Media type: Print, ebook, audiobook
- Pages: 338
- ISBN: 978-0-385-54895-3
- Preceded by: The Firm
- Website: www.jgrisham.com

The Exchange: After The Firm is a legal thriller novel by John Grisham, serving as a sequel to his famous work The Firm. The book delves into the life of Mitch McDeere, the protagonist of The Firm, exploring his new challenges fifteen years after the events of the first novel.

== Plot ==
Set in 2005 (fifteen years after The Firm), the story revolves around Mitch McDeere and his life in Manhattan. Now a partner at the world's largest law firm, Scully and Pershing, Mitch faces a complicated legal challenge when his mentor, Luca Sandroni, asks him to take over a case involving the Libyan government. The case, initially handled by Luca, who is dying of pancreatic cancer, concerns a Turkish construction company's lawsuit against the Libyan government over unpaid dues for building the Great Gaddafi Bridge. Mitch and Giovanna, Luca's daughter, travel to Libya to inspect the bridge, as part of their case. Due to food poisoning, Mitch is unable to make the trip. While traveling to the bridge, Giovanna and the security team are ambushed by terrorists disguised as Libyan soldiers. Giovanna is taken hostage and the members of the security team are beheaded with a chainsaw. A video of the execution is published to the internet. Weeks later, Mitch's wife. Abby, is approached by an ominous woman named Noura, who establishes Abby as the point of contact. The demand is revealed to be $100 million for ransom - to be paid in less than ten days. Desperate, Mitch and Luca reach out to every possible asset. As the deadline comes closer, they realize they will not get all of the money in time. All hope therefore rests on Abby McDeere's ability to convince her contact to accept $85 million instead. In the end, the terrorists accept and receive the money and Giovanna is released alive. Mitch, disappointed in the senior partners of Scully and Pershing, who would not stand up for the majority of the ransom although they could, quits and joins Luca's small law firm.

== Publication ==
The novel was published on October 17, 2023. It is available in various formats including hardcover, ebook, and audiobook. The audiobook version, which is 542 minutes long, was released on the same day as the ebook and hardcover. A large print version was also released on October 24, 2023.

== Reception ==
A review on PhDiva's blog expressed a liking for the book, praising its thrilling premise and engaging plot. However, the reviewer also noted a sense of disappointment in terms of how the novel connected with The Firm, feeling that it didn't fully capitalize on the potential of Mitch McDeere's character development. The review recommended the audiobook version for its excellent narration, which added depth to the story.
