= Anne Jackson =

American actress (1925–2016)

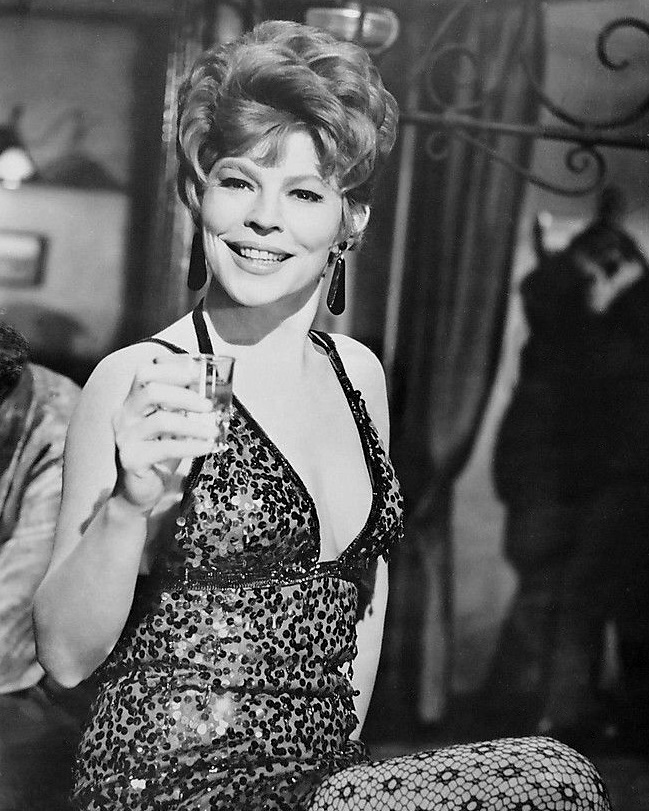
- Jackson in 1968
- Born: September 3, 1925; Millvale, Pennsylvania, U.S.
- Died: April 12, 2016 (aged 90); New York City, U.S.
- Education: Actors Studio
- Occupation: Actress
- Years active: 1945–2008
- Spouse: Eli Wallach (m. 1948; died 2014)
- Children: 3

Anne Jackson (September 3, 1925 – April 12, 2016) was an American actress of stage, screen, and television. She was the wife of actor Eli Wallach, with whom she often co-starred. In 1956, she was nominated for the Tony Award for Best Featured Actress in a Play for her performance in Paddy Chayefsky's Middle of the Night. In 1963, she won an Obie Award for Best Actress for her performance in two Off-Broadway plays, The Typists and The Tiger.

== Early life ==
Jackson was born in Millvale, Pennsylvania in 1925, the daughter of Stella Germaine (née Murray) and John Ivan Jackson, a barber. She was the youngest of three daughters, after Catherine, eight years older, and Beatrice, three years older. Her year of birth had been misreported for years as 1926, the year Jackson gave in a 1962 interview. Jackson's mother was of Irish Catholic descent and her father, whose original name was Ivan Jakšeković, had emigrated from Croatia (then part of Austria-Hungary) in 1918. Her family moved to Brooklyn, New York when she was eight years old. She attended Franklin K. Lane High School.

== Career ==
In New York, Jackson trained at the Neighborhood Playhouse and the Actors Studio. She made her Broadway debut in 1945. Her theater credits included Summer and Smoke, Arms and the Man, Luv, The Waltz of the Toreadors, Mr. Peters' Connections and Lost in Yonkers.

Jackson's screen credits include The Tiger Makes Out, The Secret Life of an American Wife, How to Save a Marriage and Ruin Your Life, Lovers and Other Strangers, Dirty Dingus Magee, Folks!, and The Shining. Her many television appearances include Armstrong Circle Theatre, Academy Theatre, The Philco Television Playhouse, Studio One, The Untouchables, The Defenders, multiple appearances, as different, similar, characters on Gunsmoke, Marcus Welby, M.D., Rhoda, The Facts of Life, Highway to Heaven, Law & Order, and ER. She narrated Stellaluna on an episode of the PBS series Reading Rainbow.

In March 2017, the Harry Ransom Center announced the acquisition of Anne Jackson's archive along with her husband's. It opened for research in 2018.

== Personal life ==
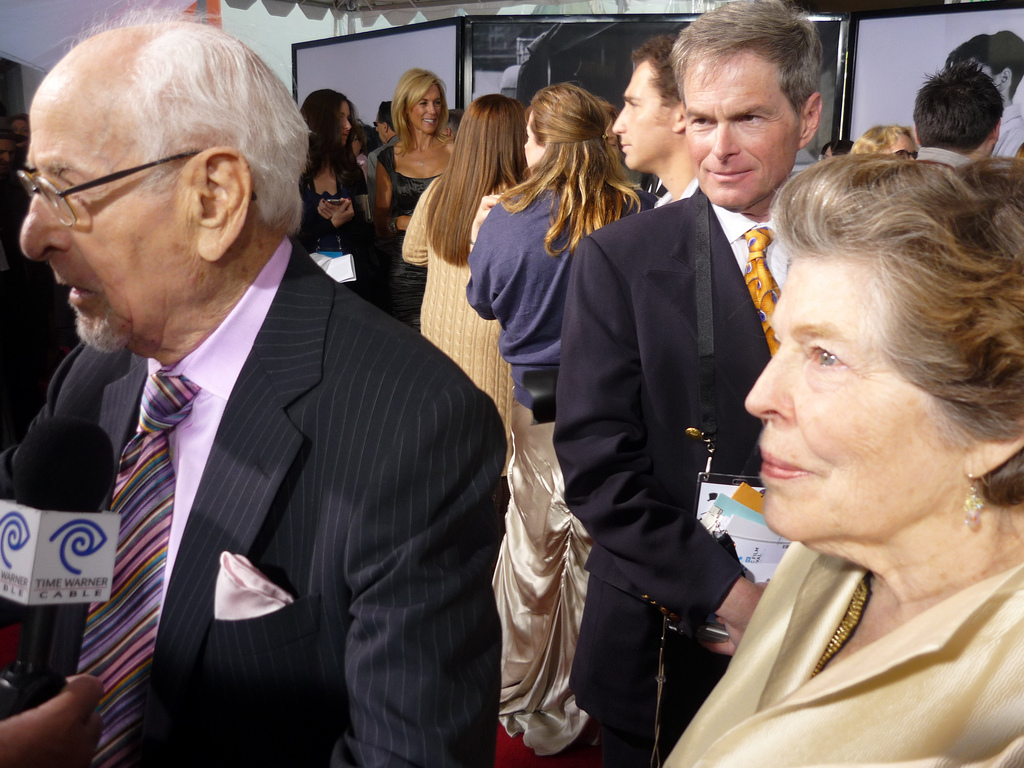
Jackson and her husband Eli Wallach in 2010

Jackson was married to actor Eli Wallach, with whom she acted frequently, from March 5, 1948, until his death on June 24, 2014. They had three children, including Roberta. Her marriage to Wallach was one of the longest and most successful in the industry. She later taught at the HB Studio in Manhattan, and continued to act in cameo roles.

== Death ==
Jackson died at her home in Manhattan on April 12, 2016, aged 90.

== Filmography ==
=== Film ===
Anne Jackson film credits
| Year | Title | Role | Notes |
|---|---|---|---|
| 1950 | So Young So Bad | Jackie Boone | |
| 1959 | The Journey | Margie Rhinelander | |
| 1960 | Tall Story | Myra Sullivan | |
| 1967 | The Tiger Makes Out | Gloria Fiske | |
| 1968 | How to Save a Marriage and Ruin Your Life | Muriel Laszlo | |
| 1968 | The Secret Life of an American Wife | Victoria Layton | |
| 1970 | Zig Zag | Jean Cameron | |
| 1970 | The Angel Levine | Customer in Delicatessen | cameo |
| 1970 | Lovers and Other Strangers | Kathy | |
| 1970 | Dirty Dingus Magee | Belle Nops | |
| 1976 | Independence | Abigail Adams | Docudrama |
| 1977 | Nasty Habits | Sister Mildred | |
| 1979 | The Bell Jar | Dr. Nolan | |
| 1980 | The Shining | Doctor | Scenes not in the European cut |
| 1984 | Sam's Son | Harriet Orowitz | |
| 1990 | Funny About Love | Adele | |
| 1992 | Folks! | Mildred Aldrich | |
| 1999 | Man of the Century | Margaret Twennies | |
| 2000 | Something Sweet | Grandma | |
| 2008 | Vote and Die: Liszt for President | Partisan woman | |
| 2008 | Lucky Days | Corkie | |

=== Television ===
Anne Jackson television credits
| Year | Title | Role | Notes |
|---|---|---|---|
| 1951 | Armstrong Circle Theatre | Lena | |
| 1952 | Lux Video Theatre | Sara | |
| 1952–1953 | The Doctor | Mary / Agatha Bunnerman | |
| 1953–1954 | The Philco Television Playhouse | Daughter | |
| 1955 | Studio One | Fredda Walters / Mattie Hobbs | |
| 1956–1962 | General Electric Theater | Jenny Dutton | |
| 1960 | Play of the Week | Eadie Horton | |
| 1960 | Lullaby | Eadie Horton | TV movie |
| 1962 | The Untouchables | Edna Gordon | |
| 1964 | The Defenders | Sally Brandt | |
| 1967 | CBS Playhouse | Vivian Spears | |
| 1971 | The Typists | Sylvia Payton | TV movie |
| 1972 | Gunsmoke | Phoebe Preston | Episode: "Blind Man's Bluff" |
| 1972 | Marcus Welby, M.D. | Alicia Blair | |
| 1973 | Sticks and Bones | Harriet | TV movie |
| 1974 | Orson Welles' Great Mysteries | Vivienne Carson | |
| 1975 | Play for Today | Helene Hanff | 84 Charing Cross Road |
| 1977 | Rhoda | Bea | |
| 1979 | The Family Man | Maggie Madden | TV movie |
| 1980 | A Private Battle | Katie Ryan | TV movie |
| 1980 | Blinded by the Light | Frances Bowers | TV movie |
| 1981 | Leave 'em Laughing | Shirlee | TV movie |
| 1982 | A Woman Called Golda | Lou Kaddar / Narrator | TV movie |
| 1985 | The Equalizer | Mrs. Henrietta Fields | Episode: "The Confirmation Day" |
| 1985 | The Facts of Life | Gwen | |
| 1986 | Tall Tales & Legends | Mother Nature | |
| 1987 | Out on a Limb | Bella Abzug | TV mini-series |
| 1987 | Worlds Beyond | Marian Burgess | |
| 1987 | Highway to Heaven | Marge Malloy | |
| 1987 | Everything's Relative | Rae Beeby | |
| 1988 | Baby M | Lorraine Abraham | TV miniseries |
| 1997 | Rescuers: Stories of Courage: Two Women | Maman | TV movie |
| 1997 | Law & Order | Judge Jane Simons | Episode: "Burned" |
| 2002 | The Education of Max Bickford | Pat | |
| 2003 | ER | Mrs. Langston | |
