= Mantak Chia =

Thai author and tantric practitioner

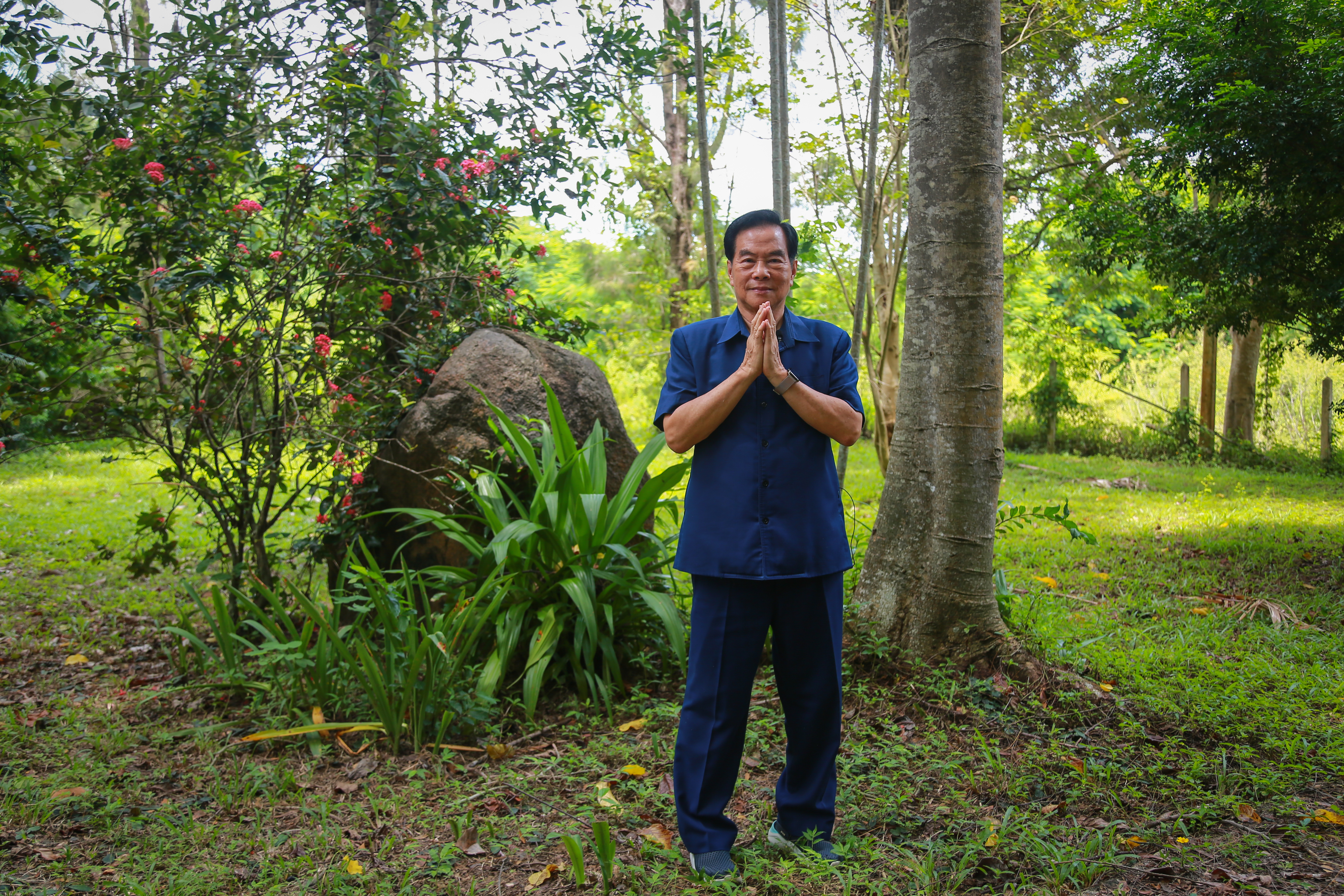
- Chia in 2022
- Born: 24 April 1944 (age 82); Bangkok, Thailand
- Occupations: Author, teacher, and energy healer
- Known for: Taoism, Qigong and Energy Medicine
- Website: mantakchia.com

Mantak Chia (Chinese: 謝明德, Pinyin: Xiè Míngdé, born April 24, 1944, in Bangkok, Thailand) is a Taoist practitioner, self-help guru and author.

== Biography ==
Chia was born to a Chinese family in Thailand in 1944. He was raised in a Christian household, with his grandfather a Baptist minister and his mother a missionary. He began studying Buddhist meditation at the age of six, and later studied Muay Thai, Tai chi, Kung fu and Taoist meditation practices from several other masters. Chia claimed the most influential Master upon his education was Yi Eng (White Cloud), an eremitic member of the Dragon's Gate sect of the Quanzhen (Complete Perfection) school of Taoism, who taught Chia a Taoist training system and authorized him to teach.

Chia established his first Universal Healing Tao school in Thailand in 1974. He later founded the Universal Healing Tao Center (originally named the Taoist Esoteric Yoga Center) in New York in 1979. Chia returned to Thailand in 1994 and established the Universal Tao Training Center (Tao Garden) in Chiang Mai.

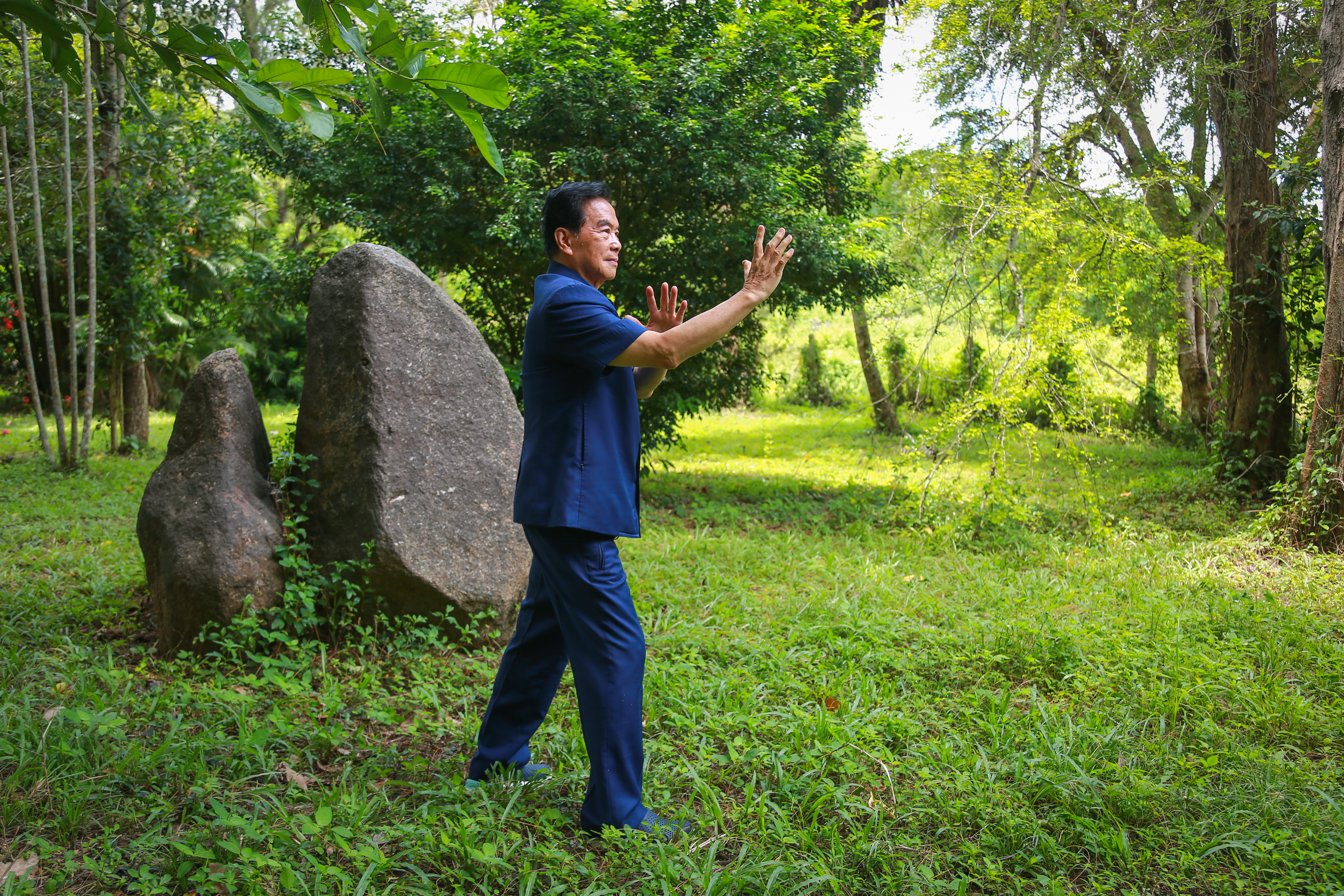
Chia practicing Tai Chi.

== Nine Formulas ==
Chia teaches a form of Taoism which he has branded "Nine Formulas". He argues that the purpose of the first two formulas is to "invoke one's awareness of Qi, to strengthen it, and to open important qi channels in one's body, such as the governor and functional channels". Chia claims these practices build a solid foundation for later formulas and that sexual energy plays important roles in qi cultivation.

The third formula, Fusion, begins what Chia calls "inner alchemy" practices. Chia claims inner alchemy traditionally has three stages: transforming jing to qi, transforming qi to shen, returning shen to void. Qi and shen are inner life energies with shen being a more refined level, and both originate from the same original universe force.

In later Kan Li practices, Chia argues one should have developed strong qi of all kinds so that intercourses of different qi take place resulting in a qi entity, call qi pearl (Chinese: 內丹), inside one's own body. This process is often described by the analogy of intercourses of a female and a male which leads to a fertilized egg. Chia argues the intensive qi activities create an internal energy body which becomes the center of further practices, and eventually, the internal body leads to Tao, reaching "immortality". Cultivating the internal body and merging into Tao are the central practices of Taoist inner alchemy.

There is no scientific evidence to support either Qi, Taoist practices or Chia's Nine Formula claims.

== Reception ==
James Miller has argued that Chia's teachings of qi and cosmology is similar to the Taoist instructor Hua-ching Ni, whereas Chia's books lack any traditional discussion of philosophy, ethics or practical advice. Miller argues the system Chia presents is a narrowly focused system of qigong rooted firmly in neidan.

Academics Machacek and Wilcox comparatively argued Chia's presenting of Taoist sexuality was written in a style intended for a Western audience which prefers a combination of theoretical knowledge and personal experience leading to a proliferation of "love manuals" on "the Taoist way of love".

Peter B. Clarke has argued that Chia's "Healing Tao" is one of the few Thai new religious movements to have achieved an international following.

== See also ==
- Energy medicine
- Pseudoscience
- Taoist sexual practices
- Traditional Chinese medicine
