= The Firm (novel) =

1991 novel by John Grisham

- First edition cover
- Author: John Grisham
- Language: English
- Series: Mitch McDeere series
- Release number: 1
- Genre: Legal thriller
- Publisher: Random House (1st edition)
- Publication date: February 1, 1991 (1st edition)
- Publication place: United States
- Media type: Print (hardback)
- Pages: 432 (hardcover 1st edition)
- ISBN: 0-385-41634-2 (hardcover 1st edition)
- OCLC: 22108726
- Dewey Decimal: 813/.54 20
- LC Class: PS3557.R5355 F57 1991
- Followed by: The Exchange

The Firm is a 1991 legal thriller by American writer John Grisham. It was his second book and the first that gained wide popularity. In 1993, after selling 1.5 million copies, it was adapted into a film of the same name starring Tom Cruise, Gene Hackman and Jeanne Tripplehorn. Grisham's first novel, A Time to Kill, came into prominence afterwards due to this novel's success.

A sequel novel, The Exchange, was published in October 2023.

== Plot ==
Mitch McDeere is a graduate of Western Kentucky University with a degree in accounting, who passed his Certified Public Accountant exam on the first attempt and graduated third in his class at Harvard Law School. Mitch is married to his high-school sweetheart, Abby McDeere. His older brother Ray is imprisoned for manslaughter, and his other brother, Rusty, died in Vietnam. His mother has mental health issues and lives in Florida.

Mitch receives an unusual offer from Bendini, Lambert and Locke, a small tax law firm based in Memphis. The offer includes a large salary, a new car, and a low-interest mortgage on a house. Soon after he joins as an associate, he passes his bar exam.

Two of Mitch's colleagues, Marty Kozinski and Joe Hodge, die in a scuba diving accident in the Cayman Islands a few days before he starts at the firm. During a memorial service at the firm, Mitch notices plaques commemorating three other attorneys who died while working at the firm, one in a car accident, one in a hunting accident, and one by suicide. Suspicious, he hires a private investigator, Eddie Lomax, an ex-cellmate of Ray, to investigate the deaths.

Lomax discovers that the three attorneys died under suspicious circumstances. He cautions Mitch to be careful and is later murdered. FBI agent Wayne Tarrance confronts Mitch, telling him the FBI is watching the firm.

While Mitch is in Washington, D.C. on business, Tarrance approaches him again, this time alongside FBI Director F. Denton Voyles. They reveal the firm is a front for the Morolto crime family of Chicago. The firm's founder, Anthony Bendini, was the son-in-law of Morolto. For almost 50 years, the firm has lured young lawyers from humble backgrounds. Although Mitch's work has been legitimate, the partners and senior associates are deeply immersed in a tax fraud and money laundering operation that accounts for up to 75% of the firm's business. Any firm member that tries to leave is killed before they can talk. Kozinski and Hodge were in contact with the FBI at the time of their murders, leading Voyles to take personal charge of the investigation.

Mitch learns his house, office, and car are bugged. The FBI tells Mitch that in order to get enough evidence to bring down the firm, he must reveal information about his clients, including his legitimate clients, potentially ending his legal career. The FBI warns Mitch that he will almost certainly go to prison if he chooses to ignore them. The firm also investigates Mitch; the firm's security chief, DeVasher, suspects he is talking to the FBI.

Ultimately, Mitch and Abby decide to cooperate. Mitch promises to collect enough evidence to bring down the firm in return for $2 million and Ray's release. However, they secretly decide to flee after turning over enough evidence to topple the firm, since they do not trust the FBI.

Working with Lomax's secretary and lover, Tammy Hemphill, Mitch obtains and copies over 10,000 firm documents detailing decades of illegal transactions. Mitch tells Tarrance that they contain enough evidence to indict roughly half the firm's active members and several retired partners. This will also give the FBI probable cause to obtain a search warrant for the firm's building and files, providing enough evidence for a RICO indictment that will bring down the firm and cripple the Morolto family.

The firm becomes suspicious of Mitch. A top FBI official, who works as a mole for another crime family, confirms that Mitch is an informant. Exposed, Mitch flees to Panama City Beach with Ray and Abby while the Moroltos and FBI chase them. On the way, he steals $10 million from one of the firm's bank accounts, sending some of the money to his mother and in-laws, depositing some in a Swiss bank account for his use, and leaving the rest for Tammy.

Mitch, Abby and Ray manage to escape to the Cayman Islands with the help of Barry Abanks, whose son died in the incident that killed Kozinski and Hodge. With Mitch's evidence, the FBI indicts 51 active and former members of the Bendini firm, as well as 31 alleged members of the Morolto family. Mitch, Abby and Ray enjoy their newfound wealth in the Cayman Islands.

== Origins ==
Grisham himself had planned to become a tax lawyer before pivoting to trial law.

He told NBC in 2011:

My first book was published in 1989, A Time to Kill. When it came out, it didn't sell. I was very busy then as a lawyer and I told myself, “I’m going to write one more book.” When I was in law school I had a friend who was a top student and this guy was heavily recruited and would go off to visit law firms, and he came back from a trip and he said, “You know, I didn't really feel good about that firm. I got the impression that once you joined the firm you never leave, like it's owned by the Mafia or something.” Well that was ten years earlier but the idea stuck.

Grisham began writing The Firm the day after he finished A Time to Kill.

When he sent the draft to his agent, bootleg copies were made and the story was shopped around Hollywood without Grisham’s knowledge and purchased by Paramount Pictures for $600,000. The existence of a movie deal drove demand for the book deal and the book was purchased by Doubleday.

== Reception ==
The book spent 47 weeks on The New York Times Best Seller list and was the No. 1 novel of 1991.

Marilyn Stasio of The New York Times wrote that "Mr. Grisham, a criminal defense attorney, writes with such relish about the firm's devious legal practices that his novel might be taken as a how-to manual for ambitious tax-law students."

The success of the novel and the 1993 film led to a 2012 television show set ten years after the events of the original story and ended up running for one season.

== Differences with movie adaptation ==
The film based on Grisham's book kept the earlier part of the plot, but has a completely different ending. In the film, Mitch makes a deal with the FBI for his brother's release along with large sums of money in exchange for information about his firm's clients. But rather than betray his oath as a lawyer by turning the confidential files over to the FBI, Mitch finds a devious legal way to keep both the FBI and the Mafia off his back so he can continue to practice as a lawyer though not in Tennessee. Reviewer George Crown noted that:

"In this case, I have the distinct feeling that the film improved on the book. The book's Mitch undergoes a very sudden transformation - plodding lawyer to dashing action hero. Virtually nothing in what had gone before has given us any idea that he had that in him. The film's Mitch, conversely, stays very much in character. He was a clever young lawyer to start with, that was why The Firm took him on in the first place - but he just gives them a bit more than they bargained for. His way of getting out of the predicament is the quintessential lawyer's way: a very neat, devious (and a bit dubious) legal solution, which only somebody with a good legal mind could have come up with."

== Sequel ==
The Exchange: After The Firm features the return of Mitch McDeere as the protagonist. It was released by Doubleday on October 17, 2023.
