= Streamers (play) =

Play written by David Rabe

- Broadway poster by Paul Davis
- Original language: English
- Written by: David Rabe
- Characters: Roger; Richie; Carlyle; M.P.; Martin; Sgt. Rooney; Clark, M.P.; Hinson, M.P.; Billy; M.P. Officer; Sgt. Cokes
- Genre: Drama
- Setting: a Virginia army base

Premiere
- Date: April 21, 1976
- Place: Mitzi E. Newhouse Theater; Off-Broadway

Streamers is a play by David Rabe. It was included by Harold Bloom in his list of works constituting the Western Canon.

== Plot synopsis ==
The last in his Vietnam War trilogy that began with The Basic Training of Pavlo Hummel and Sticks and Bones, it focuses on the interactions and personal conflicts of a group of soldiers preparing to ship out to fight in the Vietnam War in 1965. Among them are middle class African American Roger, upper class Manhattanite Richie, who is struggling with his sexual orientation, conservative Wisconsin country boy Billy, and fearful loose cannon Carlyle, a streetwise Black man. In charge of their barracks are abrasive alcoholic Sgt. Cokes, who already has served overseas, and aggressive Sgt. Rooney, who is anxious to get into combat.

== Background ==
The title is a reference to parachutes that fail to open. Streamers originally was a one-act play entitled Knives Rabe completed in the late 1960s prior to writing the first two-thirds of his trilogy. While working as a journalist in New Haven, Connecticut, he expanded it into a full-length play. Under the direction of Mike Nichols, it premiered at the Long Wharf Theatre on January 30, 1976. The cast included Herbert Jefferson, Jr. as Roger, Peter Evans as Richie, John Heard as Billy, Joe Fields as Carlyle, Dolph Sweet as Cokes, and Kenneth McMillan as Rooney.

== Productions ==
Streamers premiered at the Long Wharf Theatre in New Haven, Connecticut in 1976. The play transferred to the Off-Broadway Lincoln Center Mitzi E. Newhouse Theater opening on April 21, 1976, and closing on June 5, 1977 after 478 performances. The cast included Terry Alexander as Roger, Paul Rudd as Billy and Dorian Harewood as Carlyle, with Evans, Sweet, and McMillian reprising their Long Wharf roles. Later in the run Mark Metcalf replaced Rudd as Billy.

=== Revival ===
Streamers was revived by the Roundabout Theatre Company. The play opened at the Off-Broadway Laura Pels Theatre on October 17, 2008 in previews, officially on November 11, in a limited engagement to January 11, 2009. This production was based on the one presented by the Huntington Theatre in 2007.

It was directed by Scott Ellis. The cast included J.D. Williams as Roger, Hale Appleman as Richie, Brad Fleischer as Billy, Ato Essandoh as Carlyle, Larry Clarke as Sgt. Cokes, and John Sharian as Sgt. Rooney.

== Awards and nominations ==
Source: Playbill Vault

Awards

- 1976 Drama Desk Award for Outstanding Play
- 1976 New York Drama Critics' Circle Award for Best American Play

Nominations

- 1977 Tony Award for Best Play
- 1977 Tony Award, Direction of a Play (Mike Nichols)
- 1976 Drama Desk Award, Outstanding Actor in a Play (Peter Evans)
- 1976 Drama Desk Award, Outstanding Director of a Play (Mike Nichols)

== Film adaptation ==
In 1983, Rabe adapted his play for a feature film directed by Robert Altman and produced by Robert Michael Geisler and John Roberdeau (The Thin Red Line). The cast included David Alan Grier as Roger, Mitchell Lichtenstein as Richie, Matthew Modine as Billy, Michael Wright as Carlyle, George Dzundza as Cokes, and Guy Boyd as Rooney. The movie was awarded a Golden Lion for its entire ensemble cast at the Venice Film Festival. The film was released on DVD via Shout! Factory in January, 2010.
