= Author! Author! (film) =

1982 film by Arthur Hiller

- Theatrical release poster
- Directed by: Arthur Hiller
- Written by: Israel Horovitz
- Produced by: Irwin Winkler
- Starring: Al Pacino; Dyan Cannon; Tuesday Weld; Bob Dishy; Alan King
- Cinematography: Victor J. Kemper
- Edited by: William Reynolds
- Music by: Dave Grusin
- Distributed by: 20th Century Fox
- Release date: June 18, 1982
- Running time: 108 minutes
- Country: United States
- Language: English
- Box office: $13.1 million (US)

Author! Author! is a 1982 American autobiographical comedy-drama film directed by Arthur Hiller, written by Israel Horovitz and starring Al Pacino.

== Plot ==
Armenian-American playwright Ivan Travalian has a Broadway play (English with Tears) in rehearsal, and the backers want rewrites. His wife Gloria moves out, leaving him with custody of five children: four from her previous marriages and his son from a previous marriage, Igor. His two stepdaughters Debbie and Bonnie Slessinger and his stepson Spike return to their respective fathers, but two of the boys, Igor and his stepson Geraldo, accompany Ivan.

The stage producer lies to the investors, claiming that popular film actress Alice Detroit has signed to play the lead on Broadway. Ivan meets with Alice, and she confesses that she is a big fan of his and would love to perform in his new play. They start dating, and she eventually moves in with him, Igor and Geraldo. One night, Ivan explains to her that he was an abandoned baby who was adopted by a family with the Armenian name Travalian. Alice becomes depressed because she misses her former social life, so she and Ivan agree that their relationship has run its course, and she moves out.

Debbie and Bonnie run away from their father Roger's home to live with Ivan, and the police come to retrieve them, but Ivan and the children stage a standoff on the roof of their building, convincing the police and Roger to let the girls stay. Spike returns to the house with his father's blessing, meaning that all the children can stay with Ivan. Ivan decides that Gloria should return as well, so he takes a taxi to Gloucester, Massachusetts, to retrieve her.

Ivan finds Gloria painting on a snowy dock with her new boyfriend Larry Kotzwinkle, where she resists his efforts to force her to return for the good of the children. Realizing her selfishness, Ivan leaves her in Gloucester, returns to New York City, and promises his stepchildren that they will always have a home with him. They attend the opening night of the play, which receives a rave review in The New York Times.

== Cast ==
- Al Pacino as Ivan Travalian
- Dyan Cannon as Alice Detroit
- Tuesday Weld as Gloria Travalian
- Alan King as Arnold Kreplich
- Bob Dishy as Morris Finestein
- Bob Elliott as Patrick Dicker
- Ray Goulding as Jackie Dicker
- Eric Gurry as Igor Travalian
- Elva Leff as Bonnie Slessinger
- B. J. Barie as Spike
- Ari Meyers as Debbie Slessinger
- Benjamin H. Carlin as Geraldo
- Ken Sylk as Roger Slessinger
- Richard Belzer as Seth Shapiro
- Frederic Kimball as Larry Kotzwinkle
- Margo Winkler as Millie
- Rachel Horovitz as Young Lady
- Matthew Horovitz as Drug Dealer
- Adam Winkler as Bystander

== Production ==
Israel Horovitz first worked with Al Pacino in 1968, when Pacino starred in his play The Indian Wants the Bronx, for which they both received Obie Awards. They spent time together over the years and jumped at the chance to work again on the film.

Author! Author! is based on Horovitz's personal experience as a divorced father responsible for two of his three children. "I felt there was a lot of room to explore the ease with which people get married in this country, the way kids come along in huge bunches and the irresponsibility of parents in taking care of those children." He also talked with his three children for inspiration. He said, "The film had to be written in a comic mode, because otherwise it's too painful to deal with." Horovitz made the protagonist Ivan Travalian an Armenian American so that the character would have a strong ethnic identity parallel to his own Jewish background.

The film was released by 20th Century Fox, and Arthur Hiller served as a director. He was drawn to the project because it is about an extended family, and that it showed "that love is what makes a family strong, not necessarily who's the natural parent".

=== Casting ===
Dyan Cannon was originally asked to play Gloria Travalian, but turned it down because she thought the character was "bitchy" and had played that kind of role before. She was subsequently asked to play Alice Detroit and agreed because she loved the character. Cannon enjoyed making the film and compared the experience to "being on a cruise". Alan King also enjoyed filming, and said that his character was a cross between Hal Prince and Zero Mostel.

Bob Elliott and Ray Goulding, the longtime comedy duo of "Bob and Ray", were billed together in the opening credits. Reflecting the film's theme of family, producer Irwin Winkler's wife, actress Margo, and then-teenaged son, future UCLA School of Law professor Adam, as well as the film's autobiographical screenwriter Horovitz's children (future film producer Rachel and future television producer Matthew), make brief appearances.

Pacino did not get along with Hiller while filming. Pacino said, "Sometimes people who are not really meant to be together get together in this business for a short time. It's very unfortunate for all parties concerned." Pacino said that he made the film because he thought that he would enjoy making a film "about a guy with his kids, dealing with New York and show business. I thought it would be fun." Pacino said that he enjoyed working with the actors, who spent time with his children.

== Reception ==
In The Globe and Mail review, Jay Scott criticized the performances of the child actors. He wrote, "The brood is composed of the most appalling set of exhibitionistic child actors this side of Eight Is Enough", and he felt "that this comedy is not funny is bad enough; that it is resolutely and maliciously anti-female is unforgivable".

Newsweek's Jack Kroll wrote, "There's nothing sadder than a movie that tries to be adorable and isn't. Author! Author! tries so hard that the screen seems to sweat."

In his review for The Washington Post, Gary Arnold criticized Pacino's performance: "Pacino's maddening articulation would seem to argue against further flings at comedy. Line after line is obscured by his whispery mumble, and this mangled speech seems particularly inappropriate in a character who's supposed to be a playwright."

Roger Ebert of the Chicago Sun-Times was also unimpressed, giving the film two stars out of four, and prompting him to ask, "What's Pacino doing in this mess? What's happening to his career?".

The film was nominated for a Golden Raspberry Award for Worst Original Song for "Comin' Home to You" at the 3rd Golden Raspberry Awards. Critic Leonard Maltin, however, gave the film a warm review, awarding it 3 stars out of 4, calling it a "slight but winning comedy". Pacino was nominated for a Golden Globe Award for Best Actor in a Motion Picture – Musical or Comedy at the 40th Golden Globe Awards.
