= David Wheeler (stage director) =

US theatrical director

- Born: David Findley Wheeler; October 7, 1925; Belmont, Massachusetts
- Died: January 4, 2012 (aged 86); Boston, Massachusetts
- Occupations: Theatre director, teacher
- Years active: 1955–2012
- Employer: American Repertory Theater (Associate Artist)
- Website: American Repertory Theater page

David Findley Wheeler (October 7, 1925 – January 4, 2012) was an American theatrical director. He was the founder and artistic director of the Theater Company of Boston (TCB) from 1963 to 1975. He served as its artistic director until its closure in 1975. Actors including Al Pacino, Robert De Niro, Dustin Hoffman, Robert Duvall, Jon Voight, Stockard Channing, James Woods, Blythe Danner, Larry Bryggman, John Cazale, Hector Elizondo, Spalding Gray, Paul Guilfoyle, Ralph Waite and Paul Benedict were part of the company.

Wheeler also taught directing and theatre at Harvard University, Boston University, and Brandeis University. He was an Associate Artist at the American Repertory Theater from 1982 until his death in January 2012. Following his death, Pacino described him as "one of the lights of my life".

== Theatre ==
=== Broadway ===
Wheeler directed twice on Broadway, staging David Rabe's Vietnam play The Basic Training of Pavlo Hummel (1977), for which Al Pacino won a Tony Award and Drama Desk Award for Best Actor, and Shakespeare's Richard III (1979), also with Pacino. Both productions originated at Theatre Company of Boston and were remounted on Broadway.

=== Theatre Company of Boston ===
In 1963, Wheeler founded the Theatre Company of Boston (TCB) with producer Naomi Thornton, and served as its Artistic Director until 1975.

During the 1960s, TCB was one of only two resident theatre companies in Boston, along with the Charles Playhouse. While the Charles produced well-known classics by authors such as Tennessee Williams and Arthur Miller, TCB produced adventurous new works by controversial playwrights such as Harold Pinter, Samuel Beckett, Sam Shepard, Edward Albee, Bertolt Brecht, Ed Bullins, Jeffrey Bush, John Hawkes, and Adrienne Kennedy. During his tenure at TCB, Wheeler directed over 80 of these productions (among them ten by Pinter, seven by Brecht, five by Albee, nine by Beckett, two by O'Neill).

Wheeler cast his plays out of Boston and New York, helping to launch the careers of then unknown young actors including Paul Benedict, Hannah Brandon, Larry Bryggman, John Cazale, Stockard Channing, Blythe Danner, Robert De Niro, Robert Duvall, Hector Elizondo, Spalding Gray, Paul Guilfoyle, Dustin Hoffman, Al Pacino, Jon Voight, Ralph Waite, and James Woods.

=== American Repertory Theater ===
Wheeler joined the American Repertory Theater (A.R.T.) in Cambridge, Massachusetts as Resident Director in 1984, where he directed over 20 productions, including Harold Pinter's The Homecoming and The Caretaker; George Bernard Shaw's Man and Superman, Heartbreak House, Misalliance, and The Doctor's Dilemma; Don DeLillo's Valparaiso (world premiere, with Will Patton) and The Day Room; Othello, How I Learned to Drive starring Debra Winger and Arliss Howard, Nobody Dies on Friday, Waiting For Godot (1995), Picasso at the Lapin Agile, What the Butler Saw, True West, Angel City, Cannibal Masque, Gillette, Two by Korder: Fun and Nobody, and David Mamet's adaptation of Chekhov's Uncle Vanya (with Christopher Walken as Astrov and Lindsay Crouse).

At the A.R.T., he directed Harold Pinter's No Man's Land in 2007, starring Paul Benedict and Max Wright, which won Elliot Norton Awards for Wheeler for Best Director and for Max Wright as Best Actor. No Man's Land was Wheeler's 14th Pinter production, which included the American premieres of The Dwarfs, A Slight Ache, and The Room.

=== Other regional theatres ===
Wheeler also directed at regional theatres including the Guthrie Theater, Alley Theatre, Paper Mill Playhouse, Berkeley Repertory Theatre, Arizona Theatre Company, Pittsburgh Playhouse, Wellfleet Harbor Actors Theater, Gloucester Stage, and the Théâtre Charles de Rochefort in Paris, where he directed the French premiere of Edward Albee's The Zoo Story.

At Trinity Repertory Company, Wheeler directed seventeen productions (from 1982–1993), including the world premiere of Tom Griffin's The Boys Next Door (later remounted at the A.R.T.), Hurlyburly, Fool for Love (with Richard Jenkins), A Lie of the Mind, Burn This, and The House of Blue Leaves.

== Good Will Hunting ==
Wheeler taught a theatre directing class at Harvard in which Matt Damon was a student. Damon brought in his friend Ben Affleck (whose father Timothy Affleck happened to be an actor and stage manager of the Theatre Company of Boston) to perform scenes in class from a draft of what would become their 1997 film Good Will Hunting. Wheeler appears in the end credits of the movie in the "Thanks to" section. At a benefit in 2000 for the American Repertory Theater that Affleck, brother Casey Affleck and Damon attended – where all three performed scenes directed by Wheeler from playwrights David Mamet, Steve Martin and Christopher Durang – Affleck said "David is why we're here. He was our acting coach."

== Filmography ==
Director

- The Local Stigmatic (1990) (with Al Pacino) - released on DVD in 2008

Actor

- The Little Sister (1986) as Falcone - directed by former Theater Company of Boston (TCB) actor and assistant Jan Egleson

== Awards and honors ==
Wheeler's honors included:

- 2008 Elliot Norton Award for Outstanding Director for No Man's Land at the A.R.T.
- 1998 Elliot Norton Award for Outstanding Production for Man and Superman at the A.R.T.
- Boston Theatre Critics Association Elliot Norton Award for Sustained Excellence (1992)
- St. Botolph Club Foundation's Distinguished Artist Award (Performing Arts) 1991
- Boston Theatre Critics Award for True West at A.R.T. (1982)
- Rodgers and Hammerstein Award, for "Having Done the Most in the Boston Area for the American Theatre," voted by the Committee of Presidents of Colleges in the Greater Boston Area (1963)
