= Theater Company of Boston =

Theater Company of Boston (TCB) was co-founded by David Wheeler and Naomi Thornton in 1963. Wheeler served as its artistic director until its closure in 1975. Actors including Al Pacino, Robert De Niro, Dustin Hoffman, Robert Duvall, Jon Voight, Stockard Channing, James Woods, Blythe Danner, Larry Bryggman, John Cazale, Hector Elizondo, Spalding Gray, Paul Guilfoyle, Ralph Waite, Charles Siebert and Paul Benedict were part of the company. Following Wheeler's death, Pacino described him as "one of the lights of my life".
