= Occupant (play) =

Occupant is a play by Edward Albee, published in 2001.

== Productions ==
The play was originally set to premiere in 2002 at Signature Theatre Company in New York City in a production starring Anne Bancroft. Bancroft fell ill with pneumonia, causing the production to be cancelled. The play premiered at the Peter Norton Space of Signature Theatre Company in 2008 in a production starring Mercedes Ruehl, Larry Bryggman and directed by Pam MacKinnon.

Cesear's Forum, Cleveland's minimalist theatre company, presented the play in the intimate Kennedy's Theatre at Playhouse Square in the fall of 2014. The production featured Julia Kolibab and George Roth.

== Synopsis ==
The entire play consists of a hypothetical interview of 20th century sculptor Louise Nevelson that takes place years after her death in 1988. The interviewer is an unnamed man that may possibly be a stand-in for the playwright or Maria Nevelson, Founder of the Louise Nevelson Foundation. The first half of the play deals with Nevelson's childhood in a family of Russian Jewish immigrants in Rockland, Maine as well as her failed marriage to Charles Nevelson. The second half chronicles her life as an artist, rise to fame, and her eventual death. Throughout the play, the interviewer takes on an active role, often questioning Nevelson's version of reality and prying into details of her personal life. The play ends with Nevelson "occupying" her place as a preeminent American sculptor.

== Themes ==
The play repeatedly deals with themes of reality versus illusion, and the reliability of memory. The play also explores feminist and Jewish identity, highlighting the challenges Nevelson faced as a Jewish woman in the art world.

== Critical reception ==
Ben Brantley writing in The New York Times described the play as having "a conversational flow that quickly carries you past fears of being trapped in a lecture hall." The review also praised Ruehl's performance as having a "seductive humility."

Andrea Simakis, in her Cleveland Plain Dealer review, wrote "In this engaging, ethereal Q&A, Albee both eulogizes his friend and fans the flame of her legend."

Christine Howey, however, in her Rave and Pan blogspot review, notes: "one wishes that more time was spent on the struggle of this inspired woman to work her way through the male-dominated art scene, and on her particular artistic vision." She praises Albee's "wit and deft conversational feints" but adds: "With apologies to Mr. Albee, the best thing about this production is the acting."
