= I Knew It Was You =

- Film poster
- Directed by: Richard Shepard
- Produced by: Brett Ratner; Stacey Reiss; Richard Shepard
- Cinematography: Jim Mullen; Kort Waddell
- Edited by: Adam Lichtenstein
- Music by: Adam Gorgoni
- Distributed by: HBO; Oscilloscope Laboratories
- Release date: January 16, 2009 (Sundance)
- Running time: 39 minutes
- Country: United States
- Language: English

I Knew It Was You: Rediscovering John Cazale is a 2009 American short documentary film about actor John Cazale, directed by Richard Shepard and produced by Brett Ratner, Stacey Reiss and Shepard.

== Background ==
The film received its title from a line from The Godfather Part II directed toward Cazale's character of Fredo Corleone. It serves as a retrospective of Cazale's distinguished acting career, which was cut short at age 42 when he died of lung cancer.

The film was produced with the cooperation of Meryl Streep, who was living with Cazale at the time of his death. It features interviews with a number of his notable co-stars and directors.

Streep, Al Pacino, Gene Hackman, Robert De Niro, and directors Francis Ford Coppola and Sidney Lumet all gave interviews. But Michael Cimino, who had directed Cazale in The Deer Hunter, refused to participate in any capacity, despite his compassion and respect for the actor.

== Release and recognition ==
I Knew It Was You debuted at the 2009 Sundance Film Festival, and had its television premiere in Spain on June 9, 2009. It was released on DVD in Fall 2010 by Oscilloscope Laboratories.

=== Critical response ===
Victoria Large wrote that "while I Knew it Was You works as a wonderful career retrospective for fans or a great primer for newcomers, the real power of the piece lies in the juxtaposition of the highlights of Cazale's career with the warm remembrances of his friends and the biographical facts of his life." Don R. Lewis of Film Threat felt that the film did not properly cover Cazale's early life, writing, "From its awkward running time of 40 minutes to the way director Richard Shepard completely skims over the man's life outside of acting, I just didn't feel there was enough going on to make this doc truly special. That being said, I Knew It Was You is an excellent tribute piece to a fine actor and a great way to learn more about the roles and work ethic of Cazale."

=== Awards and nominations ===
2009: Won audience award at Newport International Film Festival.
