= My Old Lady (film) =

2014 film

- U.S. theatrical poster
- Directed by: Israel Horovitz
- Written by: Israel Horovitz
- Based on: My Old Lady by Israel Horovitz
- Produced by: Rachael Horovitz; Gary Foster; Nitsa Benchetrit; David C. Barrot
- Starring: Kevin Kline; Kristin Scott Thomas; Maggie Smith; Stéphane Freiss; Dominique Pinon; Noémie Lvovsky
- Cinematography: Michel Amathieu
- Edited by: Jacob Craycroft; Stephanie Ahn
- Music by: Mark Orton
- Production companies: Cohen Media Group; BBC Films; Protagonist Pictures; Tumbledown Productions; Deux Chevaux; Katsize Films; Krassnoff/Foster Entertainment; Ingenious Media; Cinetic
- Distributed by: Curzon Film World (UK); Cohen Media Group (U.S.)
- Release dates: September 2014 (TIFF); 10 September 2014 (U.S.); 21 November 2014 (UK)
- Running time: 107 minutes
- Countries: United Kingdom; United States; France
- Languages: English; French
- Budget: $5 million
- Box office: $8.6 million

My Old Lady is a 2014 comedy-drama film written and directed by Israel Horovitz in his feature directorial debut, based on his 1996 play of the same name. The film stars Maggie Smith, Kevin Kline, Kristin Scott Thomas, and Dominique Pinon. It was screened in the Special Presentations section of the 2014 Toronto International Film Festival.

== Plot ==
Mathias Gold, a down-and-out New Yorker, inherits a large, valuable apartment in Paris from his estranged father. He spends all the money he has on an airplane ticket to Paris, planning to sell the apartment. Once there, however, he discovers that an elderly woman, Mathilde Girard, lives in the apartment and that his father purchased it from her 43 years ago under a contract known in French property law as a "viager": the buyer pays a reduced price for the apartment, but the seller may continue living in it for the remainder of their life, during which time the buyer must pay the seller a fixed monthly amount. Mathias, as the owner, will thus be required to pay Mathilde €2,400 a month until she dies, unless he sells the contract to someone else.

Mathias has no money, but Mathilde allows him to stay in the apartment in exchange for his father's gold watch. That night, Mathias encounters Mathilde's daughter, Chloé, and learns she is living there, too; she is initially hostile toward him. Chloé invites Mathias to a café, and he invites developer François Roy, who has already discussed buying the apartment with him, to join them. Roy, whom Chloé already knows and despises, offers to buy Mathias's contract from him; Mathias asks for a week to consider the offer. Chloé tells Mathias that if he accepts the offer, she will be thrown out on the street when her mother dies. Mathias eventually accepts Roy's offer pending signature of the contract.

Mathias learns Mathilde and his father had a long-lasting affair that began when they were young; she was married to a wealthy businessman, while Mathias's father was penniless and had only just met his mother. Mathilde stayed with her husband for Chloé's sake. Mathias tells Mathilde how her affair with his father affected him: he felt unloved and ignored, so he turned to drink and had a string of failed marriages, even trying to commit suicide at age 40. Mathilde says she never saw his father again after Mathias's mother died.

Chloé is having an affair with a married man, which Mathias discovers and even tries to use to blackmail her into waiving his monthly payments. Reflecting upon how her mother's affair affected her and Mathias, Chloé breaks off her own. She tells Mathias she was 10 when she became aware of what was going on, but could do nothing about it. Mathias replies that at that same age, he had to act to prevent his mother from committing suicide. She tries to console him, but he pushes her away.

Mathilde seeks to assuage her guilt by claiming that Mathias's mother must have known and even approved of her affair with his father. When he informs Mathilde that his mother attempted suicide several times before finally succeeding when he was 19, she collapses from shock, having been told his mother died from an illness.

Mathias and Chloé share a kiss and spend the night together. The next morning, Mathias overhears a confrontation between Chloé and Mathilde in which Chloé asks if she and Mathias have the same father; Mathilde responds that she does not know. Mathias goes for blood tests, and Chloé's doctor confirms that they are not related.

Rather than signing Roy's contract, Mathias decides to stay with Chloé. Mathilde returns his father's watch to him, telling him it was she who gave it to his father in the first place. She points out that he and Chloé will not have to worry about money, as they will soon be able to sell the apartment under a viager; although they will not get full value for it, they will always have a roof over their heads.

== Cast ==
- Kevin Kline as Mathias "Jim" Gold
- Kristin Scott Thomas as Chloé Girard
- Maggie Smith as Mathilde Girard
- Stéphane Freiss as François Roy
- Dominique Pinon as Monsieur Lefebvre
- Stéphane De Groodt as Philippe
- Christian Rauth – Furniture Dealer
- Delphine Lanson – Femme de Ménage (house keeper)
- Noémie Lvovsky as Dr. Florence Horowitz (Mathilde's doctor)
- Sophie Touitou as Female Opera Singer
- Nathalie Newman as Philippe's Wife
- Ora Yermia as Girl with Roses
- Gillian Horovitz as Gardienne
- Balkissa Touréh as Messenger

== Development ==
The film My Old Lady is an adaptation of Horovitz's play of the same name, which premiered in 1996 at the Gloucester Stage Co., founded by Horovitz in East Gloucester, Massachusetts.

Horovitz, principally a playwright and theatre director, had previously directed only one film, 3 Weeks After Paradise, a 51-minute testimonial from 2002 about his family's experiences following the September 11, 2001, terrorist attacks on New York's World Trade Center.

== Production ==
My Old Lady is a British–French–American film production venture between BBC Films, Cohen Media Group, and Deux Chevaux Films. The film is produced by Rachael Horovitz (Moneyball), Gary Foster (Sleepless in Seattle), Nitsa Benchetrit and David Barrot. Film production began filming on location in Paris and its surrounding suburbs on 26 September 2013.

== Reception ==
On Rotten Tomatoes the film has an approval rating of 61% based on 89 reviews. The site's consensus reads, "Although My Old Lady doesn't quite live up to its stars' talents, Kevin Kline and Maggie Smith carry the film capably whenever they're together onscreen." On Metacritic, the film has a score of 53 out 100 based on reviews from 19 critics, indicating "mixed or average reviews".

John DeFore of The Hollywood Reporter wrote: "Kline remains a pleasure to watch, surviving the character's deepening self-pity and making his suspiciously unwriterly carelessness with words (he refers to the trophy head of a wild boar as a "pig") almost charming." Variety's Andrew Barker gave a mixed review: "Its translation from stage to screen looks to have been a bit rocky, and the film never manages to transcend its actors-workshop aura and develop into something deeper."
