= 13th Street Repertory Theatre =

Theater in New York City

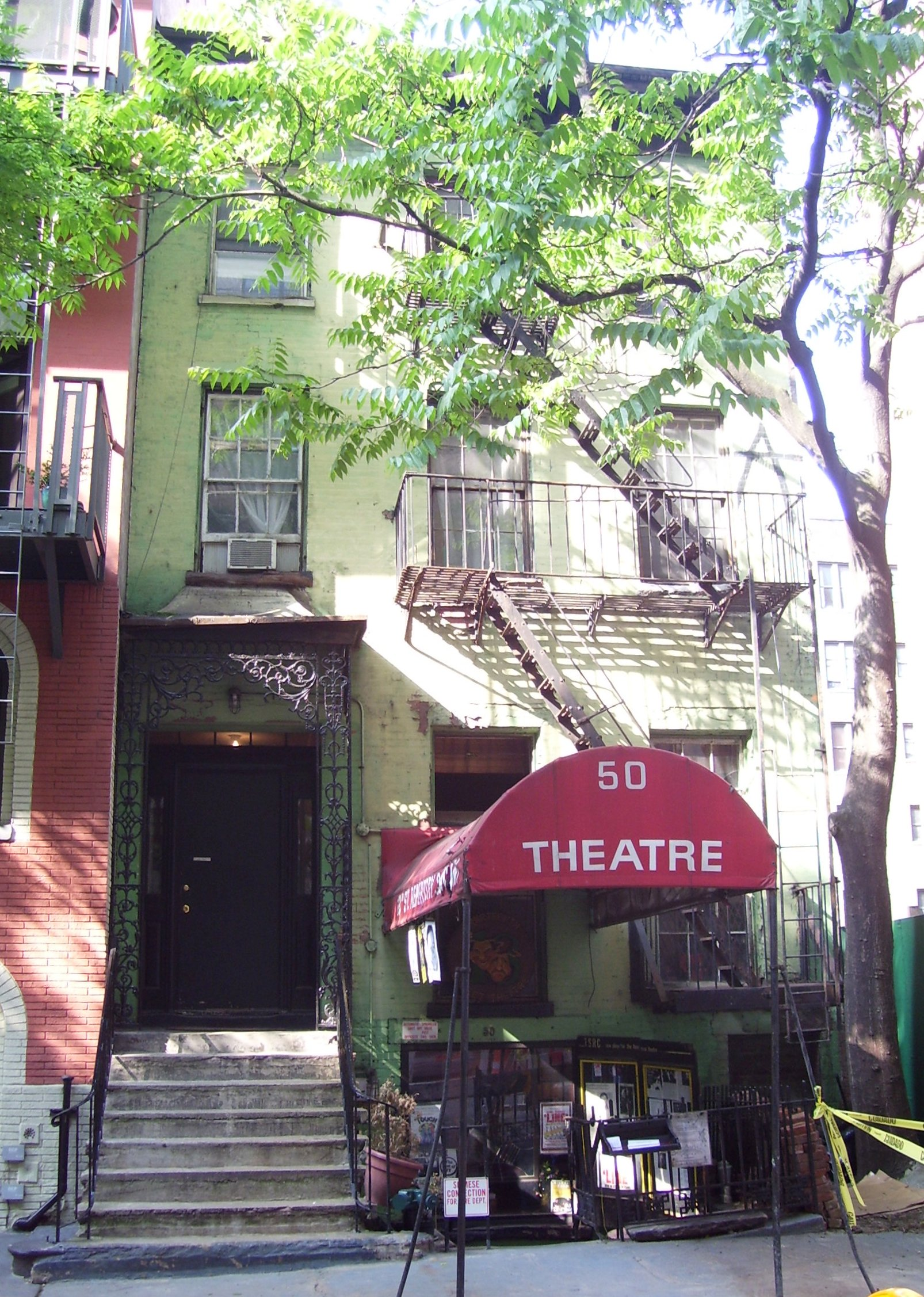
- Interactive map of 13th Street Repertory Theatre
- Former names: 13th Street Theatre
- Address: 50 West 13th Street; Manhattan, New York City; United States
- Coordinates: 40.7362°N 73.9965°W
- Capacity: 65
- Type: Off-off-Broadway theater

Construction
- Opened: 1960s
- Closed: 2023

13th Street Repertory Theatre (originally the 13th Street Theatre) was an off-off-Broadway theater located in the basement of a townhouse at 50 West 13th Street in Manhattan's Greenwich Village. Established as a performance venue in the early 1960s, it became a part of New York City's off-off-Broadway movement, hosting experimental theatre companies, emerging playwrights and performers. The theater hosted early productions by the Ridiculous Theatre Company and the first musical by Barry Manilow.

Under the ownership of producer Edith O'Hara, the venue was renamed 13th Street Repertory Theatre and became known for nurturing new theatrical works. Its most notable production was Line by Israel Horovitz, which became the longest-running play in off-off-Broadway history. The theater closed in 2023. In 2024, the New York City Landmarks Preservation Commission designated the building a New York City landmark.

== History ==
The theater was in the basement level of a townhouse located at 50 West 13th Street, Manhattan, parts of which date back to the late 1700s. A trap door in what was formerly a carriage house, now the theater's backstage dressing room, leads down to a cellar dating back to the Pre-Civil War Era. That cellar was a Greenwich Village way station on the Underground Railroad. In the 1940s, the building was a ceramics studio and hub for artists.

From the early 1960s, the building's basement level became a performance space called the 13th Street Theatre, one of many small venues that were springing up in the early years of the off-off-Broadway movement. The Drunkard, the first musical by then 19-year-old composer Barry Manilow, was performed at the space on weekends from 1964 to 1970, promising its audiences "free beer or root beer" during its two shows each night.

In the early 1970s, the 13th Street Theatre was home to the Ridiculous Theatre Company. They presented productions such as Corn in December 1972, Shanghai Loca by Alexis Del Lago in March 1973, and Camille in June 1973. In 1973, producer Edith O'Hara presented Hot and Cold Heroes at the theater. The play, written by Albert Poland, contained a "segment spoofing such practitioners of the Off-Off-Broadway theater scene as author-composer Al Carmines and the Playhouse of the Ridiculous."

O'Hara became the owner of the theater and renamed it 13th Street Repertory Theatre. She intended to make it a place for actors, directors, playwrights and designers to develop and create theater arts in a supportive environment. In 1974, O'Hara presented Israel Horovitz's expressionistic comedy Line, which went on to become the longest-running play in off-off Broadway history. Its final performances in 2018 were directed by Jay Michaels and co-produced by Mary Elizabeth Micari, using the show's original production scheme.

Comic monologuist and TV personality Brother Theodore performed his "stand up tragedy" act at the theater on and off for over twenty years. The Accidental Pervert, a play about a boy’s coming of age via a childhood studded with perpetual pornography, ran at 13th Street Repertory Theatre from 2012 to 2015. It starred Andrew Goffman and was directed by Charles Messina. The theater ran its first contracted off-Broadway show in July 2018, the BAHR production of Jerry Small's Before We're Gone, directed by Joe John Battista, the theater's artistic director starting in 2015. A 2019 revival of Tom Eyen's Women Behind Bars was directed by Battista. The theater closed in 2023.

Following a four-year preservation campaign, the New York City Landmarks Preservation Commission designated the building a New York City landmark in October 2024. The designation, under the name "Jacob Day Residence", recognized its associations with abolitionist and civil rights leader Jacob Day, suffragist Sarah Smith Garnet and 13 Street Repertory Theatre.

== Edith O'Hara ==
Edith O'Hara (born Edith Mildred Hopkins; February 15, 1917 – October 16, 2020), a former newspaper reporter and schoolteacher from Idaho, she became a theater producer in the 1950s in Pennsyolvania in the 1950s. Arriving in New York by the 1960s, her earliest production in New York was Kenn Long and Jim Crozier's musical Touch. She founded 13th Street Repertory Theatre in 1972 and was co-owner of the building from the early 1980s, living in an apartment upstairs from the theater. O'Hara championed one of the first productions on the subject of same sex marriage, Bill Solly and Donald Ward's Boy Meets Boy. Besides presenting new theater works, O'Hara sought to entertain young audiences and educate young artists. Her after-school programs for children included Mama Hare's Tree and the Kid City Theater. Her two daughters, Jill O'Hara and Jenny O'Hara, are theater and film actors. Her son is singer/songwriter Jack O'Hara, a founding member of the country rock band Eggs Over Easy. She died at the age of 103.
