= Michael Jackson (television executive) =

British television producer and executive (born 1958)

- Born: Michael Richard Jackson; 11 February 1958 (age 68); Macclesfield, Cheshire, England
- Education: University of Westminster
- Title: Controller of BBC2 (1993–1996); Controller of BBC1 (1996–1997); Chief Executive of Channel 4 (1997–2001); Chairman of Universal Television (2002–2004)
- Spouse: Rachael Horovitz
- Children: 2

Michael Richard Jackson (born 11 February 1958) is a British television producer and executive. He is known for being one of only three people to have been Controller of both BBC1 and BBC2, the main television channels of the British Broadcasting Corporation, and for being the first media studies graduate to reach a senior level in the British media. He was also the Chief Executive of British television station, Channel 4, between 1997 and 2001. In 2018, he co-founded Two Cities TV, with Wall to Wall Media founder and ex-CEO Alex Graham.

== Early life and career ==
Born in Macclesfield, Cheshire, Jackson was the son of Ernest Jackson, a baker, and his wife Margaret. He was educated at The King's School, at the time a direct-grant grammar school, and now an independent school in Macclesfield, Cheshire and his sister, Hilary, later claimed in a newspaper feature that he was already focused on a media career by the age of twelve. Following school, Jackson studied at the Polytechnic of Central London (renamed the University of Westminster in 1992), from which he graduated with a First Class Honours BA in Media Studies in 1979. The media studies degree at the Polytechnic of Central London had been launched by David Cardiff in 1969, when the institution was still known by its former title of Regent Street Polytechnic, and was the first such degree course ever to have been established in the United Kingdom.

Immediately after graduating, Jackson became the organiser of "The Channel Four Group", having written his final year dissertation at college on the prospect of a fourth national television channel in Britain. The Channel Four Group was a collective of television producers lobbying the British Government to establish a new independent television channel outside of the BBC / ITV duopoly, to act as a "publisher" of programmes produced by independent production companies rather than using the almost exclusively in-house production methods the existing channels then employed. This channel, named Channel 4, was eventually launched in 1982, and Jackson was the producer of one of its first major documentary series, The Sixties, screened that year.

The following year he joined the staff of the independent production company Beat Productions Ltd, where he continued to make programmes for Channel 4. Two of the programmes he worked on for the channel during the 1980s were Open the Box, which looked at the way television programmes were both produced and viewed and the attitudes held towards them, and The Media Show, of which he was founding editor when it launched in 1987. The Media Show was described by Waldemar Januszczak in The Guardian newspaper in 1997 as "one of the defining television programmes of the 1980s... In Michael Jackson, its first producer, it gave us a media-genius."

Despite his success in the independent sector however, in 1988 Jackson was persuaded by Alan Yentob, the then Controller of BBC Two, to join the staff of the BBC. Jackson came to be seen as something of a protégé of Yentob's during his time at the corporation, both coming from a background in arts and media programming, and Yentob immediately installed Jackson as the founding editor of the new late-night BBC 2 arts magazine series The Late Show.

== BBC ==
Prior to the launch of The Late Show in January 1989, there was some scepticism as to whether or not the programme, running four nights per week on BBC 2 in a late night slot after Newsnight, would be a success. In a feature for The Times newspaper on television arts coverage, published two months prior to the show's launch, Bryan Appleyard wrote that: "the real tension is building up around The Late Show and its young creator, Michael Jackson." Appleyard pointed out that: "the investment financial, intellectual and egotistical in the programme is enormous... Yentob is determined to put his own cultural stamp on BBC2 and Jackson has everything to prove." However, the programme went on to be a success, running for six years. Looking back at The Late Show and other television arts programming in a feature for The Guardian in 2003, David Herman felt that the programme represented the last great era of television arts coverage. "The Late Show cast its net wider in terms of formats... What drove it was the enthusiasm and passions of its presenters, producers and editors, and this built a certain eclecticism and unashamed highbrowness into its agenda... It could be argued that the real high point of intellectual life on British television was not the 1960s or the 1970s, but the decade between the beginning of Channel 4 and the end of The Late Show in 1995."

Jackson remained as editor of The Late Show for the next two years, until in 1991 he was promoted to become BBC television's Head of Music and Arts. At the age of thirty-three, he was the youngest Head of department in the history of the BBC.

In 1993, at the age of thirty-five, he became the second youngest Channel Controller in the BBC's history when he was promoted to succeed Yentob, who had been promoted to Controller of BBC 1, as Controller of BBC 2. Jackson's time at BBC 2 was generally seen as a great success — he was described by The Guardian in 1996 as "one of the best controllers BBC2 has ever had." During his time in charge of the channel it increased its average audience share from 10% to 11%, and was the only channel during that period to increase its audience share in households which had cable or satellite television.

Jackson enjoyed particular success with drama at BBC 2, finally commissioning the production of Peter Flannery's serial Our Friends in the North (1996) in 1994 after the drama had spent a decade in development and been commissioned and then cancelled on two previous occasions. Its £7 million budget was a record for BBC 2, but the serial was a great success, garnering huge critical acclaim and many accolades at the British Academy Television Awards (BAFTAs), Royal Television Society Awards and others. Other drama successes came with This Life (1996–97) and the American import The X-Files (1994–96; its ratings success on BBC 2 saw it transferred to BBC 1).

Other successes Jackson oversaw at the channel included the documentary series The Death of Yugoslavia (1995) and The House (1996), the daytime television series Ready Steady Cook (1994–2010) and Esther (1996–98) and the comedies The Day Today (1994), Knowing Me, Knowing You with Alan Partridge (1994) and The Fast Show (1994–2000). However, he also took the decision to cancel The Late Show, the series he himself had initiated, in 1995. "I think it simply boils down to Michael not wanting to spend that much money that late," was how one "insider" described the decision to The Sunday Times newspaper. He also delayed the transmission of the second series of the sitcom Joking Apart; this has been seen as ruining the momentum that the series needed to become established.

Jackson's next move came somewhat unexpectedly in the summer of 1996, when the Director-General of the BBC, John Birt, unveiled a series of major — and controversial — changes to the structure of the corporation. The administration of the BBC was to be split into two main divisions; BBC Broadcast, responsible for the commissioning of programmes and the running of the channels, and BBC Production, responsible for producing in-house programme content. Some of these changes were made very suddenly — Alan Yentob was informed that he was to be moved on from his post as Controller of BBC 1, and allegedly given just forty-eight hours to decide whether he wanted to run BBC Broadcast as Director of Television or BBC Production as Director of Programmes.

Yentob chose the latter, which although technically a promotion was interpreted by some as him having effectively been sidelined. In his place, Jackson was promoted to a dual role as both Controller of BBC 1 and Director of Television, responsible overall for all BBC television broadcasting as well as the implementation of planned future services on the new digital television platforms. The Guardian suggested, in reference to Jackson's replacement of Yentob at BBC 1, that "in the end Yentob was eclipsed by his protege."

Jackson had little time to make a significant impact in his new senior role at BBC One, however. He did commission a new range of idents for the channel, keeping the traditional "globe" theme used since 1963, but now based around the globe in the form of a roaming hot air balloon. But in May 1997, after less than a year in his new post and in what The Guardian described as "a hammer blow" to the BBC, Jackson was tempted away from the corporation to succeed Michael Grade as the Chief Executive of Channel 4. He took up the post at the end of June.

== Channel 4 ==
At Channel 4, Jackson enjoyed several successes. In 1998 the channel won the rights to broadcast the England cricket team's home Test matches in a £103 million deal, for the first time in history taking the coverage away from the BBC, which had broadcast television coverage of such matches since 1938. Channel 4's coverage of the sport went on to win a British Academy Television Award (BAFTA) for Best Sports Coverage in 2000.

The channel's comedy output faced particular success under Jackson's aegis, with the sitcoms Spaced (1999–2001), Black Books (2000–2004), sketch show Smack the Pony (1999–2003), the satire Da Ali G Show (2000), and So Graham Norton (1998–2002) all proving to be popular successes. However, it was the launch of the British version of Big Brother (2000–2018) that proved to be his longest-lasting legacy, with the reality television series becoming an immediate popular culture event and proving to be a returning mainstay of the Channel 4 schedules.

Jackson is often cited as the reason for the channel's once flagship soap opera Brookside being removed from primetime in 2002 before finally being axed in 2003 after 21 years, so much so that the main antagonist in the soap's final few episodes was named Jack Michaelson, a drug dealer who was hated by the residents of the Close and eventually hanged from a bedroom window in the final episode.

In drama, Jackson was at times criticised for relying more on US imports than home-grown material, with Ally McBeal, The West Wing and Sex and the City all arriving at the broadcaster during his time there. In 1999, he also spent £100 million reacquiring the rights to the US drama series ER — in a joint deal which also included the sitcom Friends — which Channel 4 had lost first-run rights for to rival broadcaster Sky1 in 1996. Home-grown drama successes were rarer, as he himself admitted in a 2001 interview with The Guardian. He did, however, point to significant British drama successes with Queer as Folk (1999–2000) and Teachers (2001–04), describing the former as one of the "signature shows" of his time at the channel.

The high spending on imported shows, however, contributed to a financial shortfall at Channel 4 that saw the channel negotiating a £55 million overdraft in his final year in charge, and by October that year having already used up most of a £49 million reserve it had set aside for the year. Jackson also later admitted that he had made a mistake in setting up the channel's independent film production company FilmFour Limited in 1998. Channel 4 had participated in feature film production ever since its launch in 1982, backing successful films such as Four Weddings and a Funeral (1994), but FilmFour Limited was an attempt to set up a full-blown rival to Hollywood studio productions. The studio saw several of its big-budget films flop, and was eventually closed down in 2002, with the channel going back to its original more modest film backing strategy. More successful spin-offs from the main channel under Jackson's control were the establishment of the offshoot digital television channels E4 and Film4, which continued to grow successfully.

In 2001 Channel 4 won eleven BAFTAs, but on 23 July that year Jackson shocked many in the British television industry when he announced that he had decided to leave the channel to work for Barry Diller's USA Entertainment company. Jackson had first been approached by Diller in 2000, but had declined his initial offer as he had wanted to remain at Channel 4 to oversee the launch of the E4 digital channel. The reaction to Jackson's departure was similar to that which had greeted his equally unexpected move from the BBC four years previously. One producer for Channel 4 told The Independent the week that his decision was announced that: "We are devastated."

== Move to the United States ==
Jackson's initial role in the US was as president and Chief Executive of USA Entertainment. In this role he was responsible for overseeing the cable television networks USA Network and Sci-Fi, as well as the feature film production company USA Films. After various mergers, his job became Chairman of Universal Television, and in this role he commissioned the successful drama series Monk (2002–2009) and The Dead Zone (2002–2007) and Battlestar Galactica (2004–2009) In January 2006, he was made President of Programming of Barry Diller's IAC/InterActiveCorp internet business responsible for developing and acquiring content-based web businesses. While at IAC he acquired majority control of Connected Ventures, comprising Collegehumor.com and Vimeo.com for a reported $25M. In 2021 Vimeo was spun out of IAC with a market capitalisation of $8B.

Since his move to the US, Jackson has been linked at various times with a return to a senior media position in the United Kingdom. In 2006, he was offered the role of CEO of ITV as a part of a proposed merger between the NTL cable company (now Virgin Media) and ITV plc, however BSkyB effectively blocked the merger by controversially buying a 17.9% stake in ITV plc.

== Independent producer and board member ==
Since 2010, Jackson has been an active producer while also sitting on a number of boards.

He has executive produced factual programmes including Arena: Flames of Passion (BBC, 2007, 1x90m) about the under-appreciated parts of British cinema; The Genius of Photography (BBC, 2007, 6x1hr), the first television history of photography; America: The Story of US (The History Channel, 2011, 9x1hr); Civilisations (BBC, 2018, 9x1hr); and Creativity [Working Title] (BBC, 2022, 6x1hr).

Board positions during his career have included EMI Group plc (1999–2002); Nutopia (2008–2016); Scottish Television plc (2009–2018); DIC Entertainment 2006–2009), Peters Fraser and Dunlop 2015–2020). He was chairman of the leading UK photography non-profit The Photographers Gallery between 1998 and 2001.

== Two Cities Television Ltd ==
In 2018, Jackson was executive producer on his first drama series – Patrick Melrose, starring Benedict Cumberbatch (Sky Atlantic/Showtime, 2018, 5x1hr). The series was nominated for four Emmy awards including Best Drama Series and won four BAFTAs including Best Mini-series. Patrick Melrose was produced by Two Cities TV, Sunnymarch, Rachael Horovitz' company West Fourth Films, and Little Island.

Two Cities TV was founded in 2018 by Jackson, Stephen Wright and Alex Graham with funding from BBC Studios, based in Belfast, London, and New York. In 2020, Scottish Television became Two Cities' backer and Graham left the company. Also in 2020, Two Cities was commissioned by BBC One to make the Belfast-based police drama Blue Lights.

Jackson is a Fellow of the Royal Television Society (1997) and holds an Honorary DLitt from the University of Westminster (1995).

Media offices
Preceded by Michael Grade	Chief Executive of Channel 4; 1997-2001	Succeeded by Mark Thompson
Preceded by Alan Yentob	Controller of BBC1; 1996-1997	Succeeded by Peter Salmon
Preceded by Alan Yentob	Controller of BBC2; 1993-1996	Succeeded by Mark Thompson
