= Romance (Mamet play) =

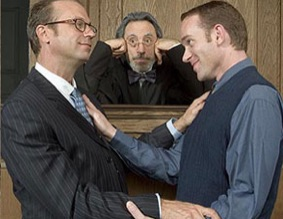
Gable Stage 2007

Romance is a play by David Mamet. It premiered Off-Broadway in 2005 and also ran in London.

== Productions ==
Romance opened Off-Broadway at the Atlantic Theater Company on March 1, 2005, and closed on May 1, 2005. Directed by Neil Pepe, the cast included Bob Balaban (The Prosecutor), Larry Bryggman (The Judge), and Keith Nobbs (Bernard). The play received a nomination for the Lucille Lortel Award, Outstanding Lead Actor (Bryggman), and nominations for the Outer Critics Circle Award, Outstanding Off-Broadway Play and Outstanding Featured Actor in a Play (Bryggman).

The play was also performed at London's Almeida Theatre, starring John Mahoney as the Judge, in September 2005.

The play has had regional productions at the Goodman Theatre Chicago in 2006, at the American Repertory Theatre, Boston in 2009 and at the Bay Street Theater, Sag Harbor, New York in 2010 with Richard Kind as the Judge.

== Synopsis ==
A courtroom is presided over by The Judge, whose allergy medications make him so drowsy he repeatedly falls asleep. Later, he becomes so manic he eventually ends up stripping in the middle of the court. Meanwhile, The Prosecutor has to deal with his flamboyant and often difficult-to-control boyfriend Bernard, nick-named Bunny. Bunny unexpectedly comes to the court room, "bringing out the inner Queer Guy in the Judge and his Bailiff. The gentile Defense Attorney is swapping racial slurs with his Jewish client, The Defendant. The Defendant suddenly comes up with a brilliant idea to solve all the problems in the Middle East.

Note: only Bernard has a given name

== Critical response ==
Ben Brantley, in his review for The New York Times wrote:"In 'Romance,' the latest work from this most imitated and parodied of living American playwrights, Mr. Mamet knocks the four-letter stuffing out of his own staccato style. He then proceeds to beat up on classic farce, ethnic and sexual stereotypes and, it might be argued, his audience. It's a take-no-prisoners approach that, unfortunately, doesn't capture laughs either."

The CurtainUp reviewer wrote:"The whole idea for Mr. Mamet's main intent (besides his obvious intent to have fun and entertain) is to use a zany trial of a case that remains purposefully vague as a launch pad to skewer everything from our justice system to politics, homosexuality, pedophile priests and religious prejudice.... The Atlantic Theater's artistic director Neil Pepe keeps the screwball elements bouncing along with laugh a minute momentum and the cast fully captures the madcap spirit."
