= Line (play) =

1967 one-act play by Israel Horovitz

- Original language: English
- Written by: Israel Horovitz
- Genre: One-act play • Theatre of the Absurd

Premiere
- Date: November 11, 1967
- Place: La MaMa; New York City

Line is a 1967 one-act play by Israel Horovitz, his first play produced. It is an absurdist drama about 5 people waiting in line for an event (what event it is, is never made clear—several of the characters' stated expectations contradict the others). Each of the characters uses their wiles in an attempt to be first in line, getting more and more vicious as the play continues.

A revival of Line is the longest-running Off-Off-Broadway show on the boards, having played continuously at the 13th Street Repertory Theatre from 1974 to 2018. After 43 years of the revival (the original production opened at LaMama in 1967), the show closed January 1, 2018 at the 13th Rep in a production directed by Jay Michaels and produced by Mary Elizabeth Micari.

== Characters ==
- Fleming - A baseball fan, he has been waiting all night at the front of the line (apparently for tickets to a baseball game). He is rather slow-witted and easily manipulated out of first place.
- Stephen - A young handsome man who looks like James Dean (according to Molly). He is an obsessive fan of Mozart. He is very verbal and confuses people (especially Fleming) with doubletalk.
- Molly - The lone female of the piece, a voluptuous woman. She uses her sexuality to lure the men out of the front spot. This is stylized by her dancing and singing with each man.
- Dolan - A philosopher who only looks out for himself. He puts forth his "Underdog" theory- when you're under the dog, that's the easiest time to kick him in the balls.
- Arnall - Molly's cuckold husband. A milquetoast who is afraid of germs. The one time in the play he actually gets to the front of the line, he abdicates in favor of another so he won't be hurt. He claims his parents and grandmother made up his name because they couldn't decide whether to name him ARthur, NAthan, or LLoyd.

== Notable former cast members ==
- Stephen - Liche Ariza / Richard Dreyfuss / Jonathan Harper Schlieman / Ben Davis / Michael Mercandetti / Emmanuel Todorow / Jason Rosette / Darin Guerasio / Gavin Walker Smith/ Kyle Cassady / Cory Moreno / Gary Clare
- Molly - Eloise Ayala / Ruthellen Cheney / Amy Hoerler / Duvall O'Steen / Deidre Schweisow / Sarah Wolfman-Robichaud / Jennifer Johnson / Naheed Khan / Heather Knox / Therese Fretwell / Hella Bel / Lowrie Fawley / Giulia Martinelli
- Arnall - Kevin Herbst / Travis Pappy / Timothy J. Cox / Roy Aaron / Gavin Walker Smith / Blake Catherwood / Neil Feigeles / Dirk Burns / Eric Paterniani / Freddie Stevens / Trip Collins / Mark Koenig / Steven F. Samuelian
- Fleming - Joe Wortman / Brian Lang / Chazz Palminteri / Jeremy Rosen / Patrick Maloney/ David Cochrane / E Gavin Walker Smith / Kristian Leavy / Brad Holbrook / Jose Antonio / Nick Luna / Jeffrey Hahn/ Ed Crane
- Dolan - John Cazale / Christopher Meloni / Reinhard Lentes / David Cochrane / Nixon Cesar / John Palotta / Gavin Walker Smith / Timothy J. Cox / Kenneth McKenzie / Tom O'Neil / Jose Antonio / Mikal Saint George / Alex Falcao /John Fitzgerald/ Greg Vorob

=== Cast notes ===
- Playwright Israel Horovitz appeared as Stephen in the first production of the play at La MaMa Experimental Theatre Club, when another actor had to drop out at the last minute.
- This was Richard Dreyfuss's first play as an actor.

== See also ==
- Long-running plays
