= Israel Horovitz =

American playwright (1939–2020)

- Born: March 31, 1939; Wakefield, Massachusetts, U.S.
- Died: November 9, 2020 (aged 81); New York City, U.S.
- Occupations: Playwright, director, actor
- Spouse(s): Doris Keefe; Elaine Abber; Gillian Adams
- Children: 6, including Adam and Rachael
- Website: www.israelhorovitz.com

Israel Horovitz (March 31, 1939 – November 9, 2020) was an American playwright, director, actor and co-founder of the Gloucester Stage Company in 1979. He served as artistic director until 2006 and later served on the board, ex officio and as artistic director emeritus until his resignation in November 2017 after The New York Times reported allegations of sexual misconduct.

Horovitz wrote more than 70 plays, many of which were translated and performed in various languages. He was the founder of the New York Playwrights Lab, and his best-known plays include Line, Park Your Car in Harvard Yard, and The Indian Wants the Bronx. Horovitz also had a film career, with notable works including the 1982 film Author! Author! and the 2014 film My Old Lady. Throughout his career, he received numerous awards and recognitions for his work in theatre and film. However, he faced multiple sexual assault and harassment accusations from women associated with his theatre companies.

== Early life and career ==
Horovitz was born to a Jewish family in Wakefield, Massachusetts, the son of Hazel Rose (née Solberg) and Julius Charles Horovitz, a lawyer. At age 13, he wrote his first novel, which was rejected by Simon & Schuster but complimented for its "wonderful, childlike qualities." At age 17, he wrote his first play, entitled The Comeback, which was performed at nearby Suffolk University. He worked as a taxi driver, a stagehand and an advertising executive before having his first success in the theatre with his play The Indian Wants the Bronx, which featured two yet-undiscovered future film stars: John Cazale and Al Pacino. The play premiered in 1966 at the Eugene O'Neill Theater Center in Waterford, Connecticut. Pacino and Cazale starred; it was the first of six collaborations between them. The play was then staged in conjunction with the playwright's It's Called the Sugar Plum and directed by James Hammerstein as the opening production of the new off-Broadway Astor Place Theatre, where it opened on January 17, 1968, and ran for 177 performances. Following his debut, about which The New York Post's Jerry Tallmer wrote "Welcome, Mr. Horovitz," Random House published a collection of four of his plays, entitled First Season (1968).

Horovitz wrote two novels: Cappella (Harper and Row) and Guignol's Legacy (Three Rooms Press); a novella, Nobody Loves Me (Les Editions de Minuit); and a collection of poetry, Heaven and Others Poems (Three Rooms Press). His memoir, Un New-Yorkais a Paris (Grasset), was published in France in 2011.

== Theatre career ==
Horovitz wrote more than 70 produced plays, many of which have been translated and performed in more than 30 languages worldwide. Among Horovitz's best-known plays are Line (a revival of which opened in 1974 and is NYC's longest-running play, closing in 2018 after 43 years of continuous performance at Off-Off-Broadway's 13th Street Repertory Theatre), Park Your Car in Harvard Yard, The Primary English Class, The Widow's Blind Date, What Strong Fences Make, and The Indian Wants the Bronx, for which he won the Obie Award for Best Play.

Horovitz divided his time between the US and France, where he often directed French-language productions of his plays. On his 70th birthday, Horovitz was decorated by the French government as Commandeur de l'Ordre des Arts et des Lettres. The 70/70 Horovitz Project was created by NYC Barefoot Theatre Company to celebrate Horovitz's 70th birthday. During the year following March 31, 2009, 70 of Horovitz's plays had productions and/or reading by theatre companies around the globe, including the national theatres of Nigeria, Benin, Greece and Ghana. He is the most-produced American playwright in French theatre history.

In 1979 Horovitz founded the Gloucester Stage Company in Gloucester, Massachusetts, and continued to serve as its artistic director for 28 years. He also founded The New York Playwrights Lab in 1975, and served as the NYPL's artistic director. He was co-director of Compagnia Horovitz-Paciotto, an Italian theatre-company that produces Horovitz's plays, exclusively. In addition, Horovitz was one of a select group of non-actors awarded membership in The Actors Studio.

Horovitz had a long-term friendship with Irish playwright Samuel Beckett and often found in Beckett a thematic and stylistic model and inspiration for his own work. Horovitz has also worked with The Byre Theatre of St Andrews, Scotland.

== Film career ==
His screenplay for the 1982 film Author! Author!, starring Al Pacino, is a largely autobiographical account of a playwright dealing with the stress of having his play produced on Broadway while trying to raise a large family. Other Horovitz-penned films include the award-winning Sunshine, co-written with Istvan Szabo (European Academy Award – Best Screenplay), 3 Weeks After Paradise (which he directed and in which he starred), James Dean, an award-winning biography of the actor, and The Strawberry Statement (Prix du Jury, Cannes Film festival, 1970), a movie adapted from a journalistic novel by James Simon Kunen that deals with the student political unrest of the 1960s. Horovitz adapted his stage play My Old Lady for the screen, which he directed in summer, 2013, starring Maggie Smith, Kevin Kline, Kristin Scott-Thomas and Dominique Pinon. The film was released in cinemas worldwide in fall 2014.

== Awards ==
He has won numerous awards for his work, including two Obies, the Drama Desk Award, The European Academy Award – Best Screenplay (for Sunshine), and The Sony Radio Academy Award (for Man In Snow on BBC-Radio 4). He also won an Award in Literature from The American Academy of Arts and Letters; The Governor of Massachusetts' Leadership Award; The Prix de Plaisir du Theatre; The Prix Italia (for radio plays); The Writers Guild of Canada Best Screenwriter Award; The Christopher Award; the Elliot Norton Prize; a Lifetime Achievement Award from B'nai B'rith; the Literature Prize of Washington College; an honorary Doctorate in Humane Letters from Salem State College; Boston Public Library's Literary Lights Award; the Walker Hancock Prize, and many others.

== Sexual assault accusations ==
In 1993, The Boston Phoenix published an article which covered a series of accusations against Horovitz by six different women associated with the GSC. The actresses and staff members alleged that the playwright used offensive language, kissed, and/or fondled them. In response, Horovitz said, "it's rubbish. Someone was fired, and this is their revenge." At the time, no charges or lawsuits were filed against Horovitz, nor was any disciplinary action taken by the GSC's board.

On November 30, 2017, a New York Times article stated that nine women said that Horovitz had sexually assaulted or harassed them between 1986 and 2016. Some of the women were under the age of legal consent at the time. As a result, Horovitz left the Gloucester Stage Company (GSC), the theater company he had founded. His son Adam Horovitz said, "I believe the allegations against my father are true, and I stand behind the women that made them."

The February 5, 2018 episode of the Hidden Brain podcast Why Now? features in-depth interviews with women who have accused Horovitz of sexual assault. On February 19, actress Heather Graham, who briefly dated Horovitz's son Adam, appeared on Marc Maron's podcast WTF and said that the elder Horovitz made predatory advances toward her following an audition for one of his plays in 1989.

== Personal life ==
He was married three times:

- Elaine Abber (m. 1959–1960); one child:
  - Julie
- Doris Keefe (m. 1960–1972) a painter of Irish descent and Catholic faith. They had three children, who were raised secularly:
  - Rachael Horovitz (born 1961), a film producer known for producing the films About Schmidt and Moneyball
  - Matthew Horovitz (born 1964), a television producer-director known for producing the NBA Network
  - Adam Horovitz (born 1966), member of Beastie Boys
- Gillian Adams, an Anglican (born 1955) and one-time winner of the Paris Marathon with whom he had two children, raised in the Jewish faith: twins Hannah and Oliver Horovitz (born 1985).

Horovitz died on November 9, 2020, from cancer in Manhattan.

== Filmography ==
=== Screenwriter ===
Year	Film	Role	Notes
1969	Machine Gun McCain	Dialogue	
1969	ITV Saturday Night Theatre (TV series) – "It's Called the Sugar Plum"	Writer	
1970	The Strawberry Statement	Screenplay	Prix du Jury, Cannes Film Festival, 1970
1971	NET Playhouse (TV series) – "Foul!/Actor's Choice" (Segment: "Play for Trees")	Writer	
1971	Believe in Me	Screenplay	
1972	VD Blues	Director and producer	
1981	La Poube (TV movie) (play)	Writer	
1982	Author! Author!	Playwright	
1991	The General Motors Playwrights Theater (TV series) – "It's Called the Sugar Plum" (play)	Writer	
1997	North Shore Fish (TV movie)	Screenplay	
1999	Sunshine	Co-writer, screenplay	European Academy Award – Best Screenplay
2001	James Dean	Writer	
2002	3 Weeks After Paradise	Director and actor	
2007	Rats (video short)	Writer	
2007	"Security" (short)	Writer	
2009	New York, I Love You (adaptation/segments "Jiang Wen", "Shunji Iwai")	Translations written by	
2014	My Old Lady	Writer and director	
