= Mercy (1995 film) =

- Directed by: Richard Shepard
- Written by: Richard Shepard
- Produced by: Rolfe Kent; Rocky Collins; Richard Shepard
- Starring: John Rubinstein; Sam Rockwell
- Music by: Rolfe Kent
- Distributed by: Ardustry Home Entertainment LLC; Unapix Entertainment Productions
- Release date: February 22, 1995
- Running time: 85 minutes
- Country: United States
- Language: English

Mercy is a 1995 independent thriller starring John Rubinstein, Amber Kain and Sam Rockwell, and written and directed by Richard Shepard. It was filmed in the boroughs of Manhattan and Queens, New York City.

== Plot ==
Two people kidnap the daughter of a famous lawyer. They want money to give her back, but it's not just money they want. It's revenge.

== Release ==
Mercy premiered on February 22, 1995, after which it received a theatrical release in the United States during 1996.

== Reception ==
Critical reception has been mixed. The film received reviews from the Daily News and The Daily Times. Lawrence Van Gelder also reviewed Mercy for The New York Times, criticizing it for having a "monotonous focus on nasty people and ugly incidents".
