= Boy Meets Boy (musical) =

- Original Off-Broadway Cast Recording
- Music: Bill Solly
- Lyrics: Bill Solly
- Book: Bill Solly and Donald Ward
- Productions: 1975 Off-Broadway; 2012 London

Boy Meets Boy is a musical comedy with music and lyrics by Bill Solly, as well as a book by Bill Solly and Donald Ward. Edith O'Hara and Jim Payne originally produced the show in February 1975, at the13th Street Theatre, New York City. After a seven-month run, O'Hara and Payne moved the show off-Broadway to the Actor's Playhouse, opening on Sept. 17, 1975 in association with Christopher Larkin and Lee Barton.

The show is a fast-paced, light-hearted musical comedy, featuring a 1930s-style Astaire/Rogers romance between two men, and a same-sex marriage. The world of the play posits that in 1936, same-sex relationships are considered as normal as heterosexual ones. The play begins against the background of the abdication of Edward VIII and ends with the Duke of Windsor's (and the protagonists') June 1937 weddings. This is appropriate, as one of the major themes is "Giving It Up for Love." The action occurs in the Savoy Hotel, a few elegant nightspots in London, a bar in Spain, and a black-sheep aunt's disreputable establishment in Paris.

The original New York cast included David Gallegly as Guy Rose, Joe Barrett as Casey O’Brien and Raymond Wood as Clarence Cutler. Edith O'Hare and Jim Payne took the show and most of the cast to the Las Palmas Theatre in Los Angeles, as well as to the Chi Chi Club in San Francisco, in 1976. The show had its London premiere in December 2012. There, the cast included Olivier Award winner Stephen Ashfield as Casey O'Brien with Johnjo Flynn as Guy Rose and Ben Kavanagh as Clarence Cutler.

== Critical reception ==
The original production at the Actor's Playhouse in New York received admiring reviews - save for a criticism in the New York Times by Mel Gussow (about the acceptance of gay marriage in the 30s, he wrote, "So much for thirties realism."). “The brightest, tunefullest, wittiest, most elegant, refined, gracious and entertaining musical in years!" wrote Carll Tucker in The Village Voice. In New York magazine, Alan Rich wrote that the play had “an uncommonly light and antic touch. The first of its kind that could happily play in an old ladies’ home in Dubuque...delightful”; while Robert Patrick said that "it rewrites the past and presents it just as entertainment, not in the Orwellian sense of trying to convince anyone the past was like that but saying that it ought to have been”. The production ran for two years. Subsequent productions in Los Angeles and San Francisco received positive reactions. It has often been revived regionally.

The 2012 production at the Jermyn Street Theatre in London was well received by the British press. Libby Purves in the Times called it “Funny, silly and, with gay marriage on the horizon, slyly topical." Emma Slater wrote that it was "an unexpected gem of a musical. The score is varied in style and form, the lyrics clever, and the script highly intelligent and very funny. Both the script and lyrics have elements of Wilde’s wit and Coward’s charm. A festive treat – highly recommended!”. Meanwhile, in the New Statesman, Ryan Gibely thought that while "in 1975 this lithe blasé vision of an alternative reality must have felt subversive [the] surprise is that it still does."

== Musical numbers ==
Prologue

- "Boy Meets Boy" - Chorus
- “Party in Room 203” - Chorus

Act I

- "Giving it Up for Love" - Casey, Andrew
- "Me" - Clarence
- "The English Rose" - Reporters
- "Marry an American" - Waitresses
- "Marry an American" - Waiters
- “It’s a Boy’s Life” - Casey, Guy
- "Does Anybody Love You?" - Guy
- "You’re Beautiful" - Guy
- "Let's!" - Guy, Casey

Act II

- “Paris” - Josephine, Guy (song added for London production)
- "Just My Luck" - Clarence, Casey
- "It's a Dolly" - Josephine, Chorus
- "What Do I Care" - Guy
- “In Love Never” - Casey (song added for London production)
- “Clarence’s Turn - Clarence
- “It’s a Dolly: Reprise” - Josephine, Chorus
- "Does Anybody Love You: Reprise" - Guy, Casey
- "Finale" - Cast
