= Patrick Melrose (miniseries) =

2018 drama miniseries

- Official poster
- Genre: Drama
- Based on: Patrick Melrose by Edward St Aubyn
- Written by: David Nicholls
- Directed by: Edward Berger
- Starring: Benedict Cumberbatch; Jennifer Jason Leigh; Hugo Weaving
- Composer: Hauschka
- Countries of origin: United Kingdom; United States
- No. of series: 1
- No. of episodes: 5

Production
- Executive producers: Rachael Horovitz; Michael Jackson; Adam Ackland; Benedict Cumberbatch; Helen Flint
- Producer: Stephen Smallwood
- Cinematography: James Friend
- Editor: Tim Murrell
- Production companies: Two Cities Television; SunnyMarch; Rachel Horovitz Productions; Little Island Productions

Original release
- Network: Showtime (United States); Sky Atlantic (United Kingdom)
- Release: May 12 – June 9, 2018

Patrick Melrose is a drama television miniseries starring Benedict Cumberbatch in the title role. All five episodes were directed by Edward Berger and written by David Nicholls, who adapted the Patrick Melrose series of semi-autobiographical novels by Edward St Aubyn.

== Premise ==
Over five decades from the 1960s to the early 2000s, wealthy Englishman Patrick Melrose attempts to overcome his addictions and demons rooted in abuse by his cruel father and negligent mother.

== Cast ==
- Benedict Cumberbatch as Patrick Melrose
  - Sebastian Maltz as young Patrick Melrose
- Jennifer Jason Leigh as Eleanor Melrose
- Hugo Weaving as David Melrose
- Jessica Raine as Julia
- Pip Torrens as Nicholas Pratt
- Prasanna Puwanarajah as Johnny Hall
- Holliday Grainger as Bridget Watson-Scott
- Indira Varma as Anne Moore
- Anna Madeley as Mary Melrose
- Blythe Danner as Nancy
- Celia Imrie as Kettle
- Harriet Walter as Princess Margaret
- Allison Williams as Marianne
- Morfydd Clark as Debbie Hickman
- Amanda Root as Virginia Watson-Scott
- Marcus Smith as Robert Melrose

== Production ==
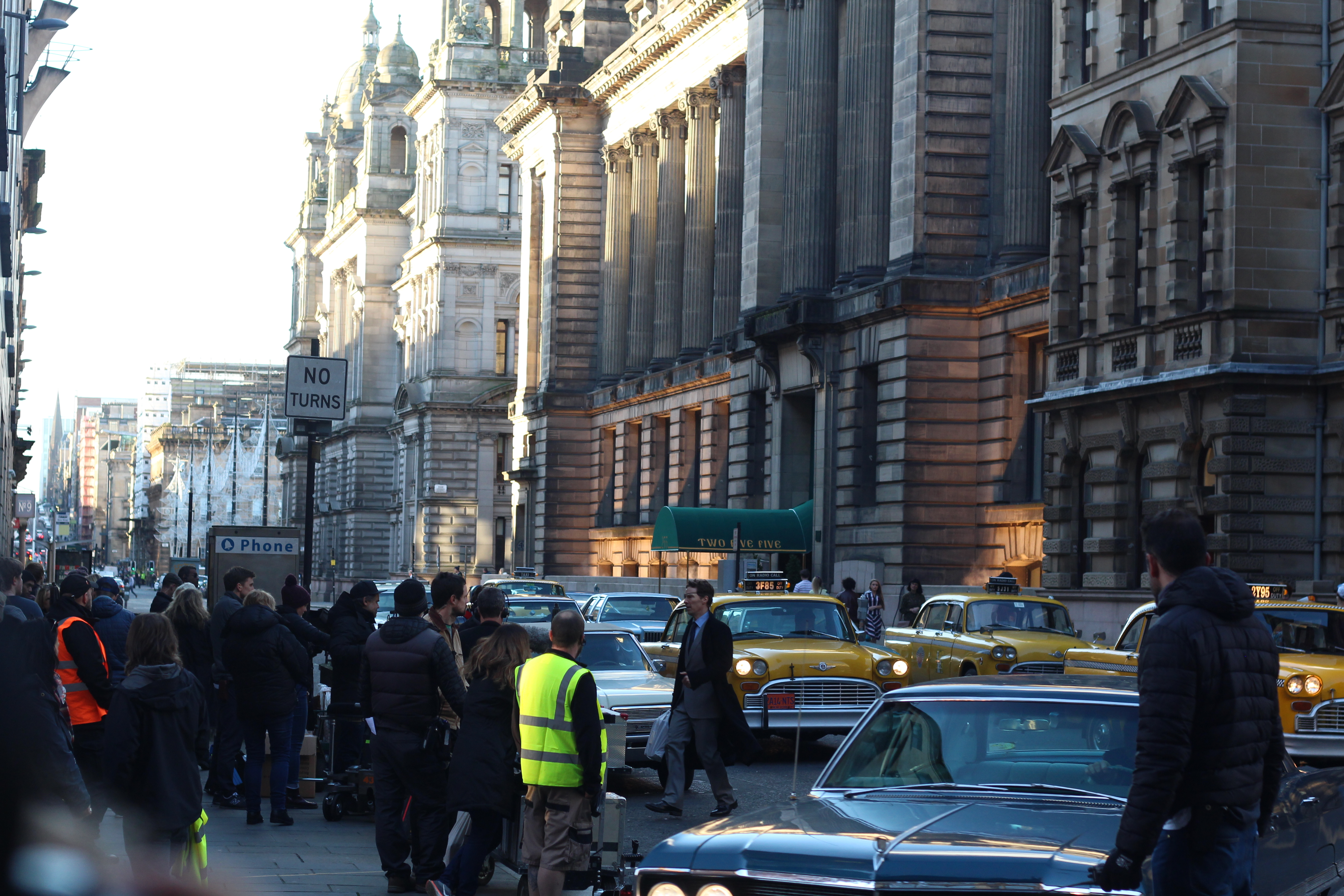
Shooting of Patrick Melrose in Glasgow, November 2017

It was announced in February 2017 that Benedict Cumberbatch would star in and produce a television adaptation of Edward St Aubyn’s Patrick Melrose book series, that would air on Showtime in the United States and Sky Atlantic in the United Kingdom. David Nicholls wrote the five episodes of the series, with Edward Berger directing. In July, Jennifer Jason Leigh and Hugo Weaving joined as Patrick’s mother and father, and Anna Madeley was cast as Patrick’s wife. Allison Williams and Blythe Danner joined in August 2017, with filming begun by October in Glasgow.

== Release ==
The first trailer debuted in April 2018, and the series premiered on May 12 on Showtime. The series consecutively streamed new episodes on CraveTV in Canada. It was shown on Sky Atlantic in the UK, and Sky Vision handled international sales of the series.

== Episodes ==
No.	Title	Directed by	Written by	Original release date	U.S. viewers (millions)
1	"Bad News"	Edward Berger	David Nicholls	May 12, 2018	0.219
In 1982, Englishman Patrick Melrose is dispatched to New York City to retrieve the ashes of his estranged father David. During his time in New York, Patrick decides to quit his longtime addiction but finds himself unable to do so as he recollects memories of his father's abuse and encounters many of David’s associates. Patrick resorts to using heroin, alcohol, and other drugs before he finally breaks down with a botched suicide attempt. Patrick places a call to his friend Johnny telling him he wishes to finally get sober.
2	"Never Mind"	Edward Berger	David Nicholls	May 19, 2018	0.186
While going through withdrawal, Patrick recalls a traumatic day in 1967 he experienced as a young boy while on holiday in France with his parents. David is manipulative and cruel while his mother Eleanor, an alcoholic, neglects Patrick and is terrified of her husband. It is revealed through a series of flashbacks that Patrick was sexually assaulted by his father while his mother was away.
3	"Some Hope"	Edward Berger	David Nicholls	May 26, 2018	0.236
It's 1990 and Patrick has been invited to a party where Princess Margaret will be present. Patrick is trying to put his substance abuse in the past and has help from his friend Johnny, who is in a therapy group. At the party, Princess Margaret behaves unpleasantly and humiliates the French ambassador. She also dismisses the hostess' daughter from meeting her and this reminds Patrick of himself as a boy when his father wouldn't allow his mother to talk to him during dinner in France. Patrick later reveals to Johnny that he was sexually abused by his father for a number of years as a young boy. The episode ends with Patrick meeting Chilly Willy, who sold him drugs during his stay in New York, and is now leaving after playing in the band at the party.
4	"Mother's Milk"	Edward Berger	David Nicholls	June 2, 2018	0.264
In 2003, Patrick is now fully sober and has become a lawyer. He brings his wife Mary and two children to South France where they visit his gravely ill mother, who has suffered a stroke. Eleanor has been taken in by a shady guru named Seamus, who has convinced her to sign the deed to the house over to the "foundation" which he leads. Being disinherited conjures up Patrick's buried resentment toward his mother, causing him to begin drinking and using prescription drugs again. His marriage to Mary is also in trouble, which he makes worse by engaging in an affair with his old girlfriend Julia when she visits. Patrick comes to terms with the loss of his childhood home and gives his blessing to his mother's plans, offering to arrange for her to be brought to London. Before leaving, Patrick is asked a favour by his ailing mother. Thereafter Patrick brings his family to Connecticut to see his snobbish aunt Nancy, where his drinking spirals out of control. After an angry confrontation with Nancy, Mary confronts Patrick and gives him an ultimatum: sober up or leave.
5	"At Last"	Edward Berger	David Nicholls	June 9, 2018	0.197
By 2005, Eleanor has died and Patrick presides over her funeral. There are flashbacks of Patrick's life over the past two years, in which his drinking problem continued unabated after separating from Mary and his children. Eventually he returns to a rehab center, and after initially resisting the process and even escaping, he returned to focus on his recovery. His mother, bedridden in a London nursing home, insisted on being euthanised, so Patrick petitioned the British government to allow her to be brought to Switzerland. After gaining approval, Eleanor changes her mind at the last minute. There is also a flashback to years earlier, when Mary and Patrick realize that his father was a child molester, and Patrick for the first time confronts his mother about the abuse; Eleanor claims to have suffered domestic violence at David's hands, and turned a blind eye to him molesting Patrick; she thought that, as long as David was hurting Patrick, he wouldn't hurt her. In the present day, Eleanor's funeral and wake turn into a bizarre show as old faces converge. Patrick struggles to reconcile the positive portrait of Eleanor from the others with his own experience of her as a neglectful mother.

== Reception ==
=== Critical response ===
The series currently has a 90% score on review aggregator Rotten Tomatoes, based on 69 critic reviews with an average rating of 7.9 out of 10. The website's critics consensus reads, "Patrick Melrose is a scathing indictment of British high society's inherited dysfunction, cruelty, and the wealth that enables them. The Crown this ain't." Metacritic, which uses a weighted average, gave the film a score of 80 out of 100 based on 32 critics. In 2019, the series was ranked 51st on The Guardian newspaper's list of the 100 best TV shows of the 21st century.

=== US ratings ===
Viewership and ratings per episode of Patrick Melrose
No.	Title	Air date	Rating (18–49)	Viewers (millions)
1	"Bad News"	May 12, 2018	0.03	0.219
2	"Never Mind"	May 19, 2018	0.03	0.186
3	"Some Hope"	May 26, 2018	0.04	0.236
4	"Mother's Milk"	June 2, 2018	0.04	0.264
5	"At Last"	June 9, 2018	0.03	0.197

=== Accolades ===
Year	Award	Category	Nominee(s)	Result	Ref.
2018	British Screenwriters' Awards	Best British TV Drama Writing	David Nicholls	Won	
2018	British Society of Cinematographers	Best Cinematography in a Television Drama	James Friend (for "Bad News")	Won	
2018	British Society of Cinematographers	Operators Award – Television Drama	Daniel Bishop	Nominated	
2018	International Online Cinema Awards	Best Actor in a Limited Series or TV Movie	Benedict Cumberbatch	Nominated	
2018	National Film and Television Awards	Best Actor	Benedict Cumberbatch	Nominated	
2018	Online Film & Television Association Awards	Best Limited Series		Nominated	
2018	Online Film & Television Association Awards	Best Actor in a Motion Picture or Limited Series	Benedict Cumberbatch	Runner-up	
2018	Online Film & Television Association Awards	Best Supporting Actress in a Motion Picture or Limited Series	Jennifer Jason Leigh	Nominated	
2018	Online Film & Television Association Awards	Best Direction of a Motion Picture or Limited Series		Nominated	
2018	Online Film & Television Association Awards	Best Writing of a Motion Picture or Limited Series		Nominated	
2018	Online Film & Television Association Awards	Best Ensemble in a Motion Picture or Limited Series		Nominated	
2018	Primetime Emmy Awards	Outstanding Limited Series	Rachael Horovitz, Michael Jackson, Adam Ackland, Benedict Cumberbatch, Helen Flint, and Stephen Smallwood	Nominated	
2018	Primetime Emmy Awards	Outstanding Lead Actor in a Limited Series or Movie	Benedict Cumberbatch	Nominated	
2018	Primetime Emmy Awards	Outstanding Directing for a Limited Series, Movie or Dramatic Special	Edward Berger	Nominated	
2018	Primetime Emmy Awards	Outstanding Writing for a Limited Series, Movie or Dramatic Special	David Nicholls	Nominated	
2018	Primetime Creative Arts Emmy Awards	Outstanding Casting for a Limited or Anthology Series or Movie	Nina Gold and Martin Ware	Nominated	
2018	Television Critics Association Awards	Outstanding Achievement in Movies, Miniseries and Specials		Nominated	
2018	World Soundtrack Awards	Television Composer of the Year	Hauschka	Nominated	
2019	American Society of Cinematographers Awards	Outstanding Achievement in Cinematography in Motion Picture, Miniseries, or Pilot Made for Television	James Friend (for "Bad News")	Won	
2019	Artios Awards	Outstanding Achievement in Casting – Limited Series	Nina Gold	Nominated	
2019	British Academy Television Awards	Best Mini-Series	Michael Jackson, Rachael Horovitz, Edward Berger, Helen Flint, and David Nicholls	Won	
2019	British Academy Television Awards	Best Leading Actor	Benedict Cumberbatch	Won	
2019	British Academy Television Craft Awards	Best Writer – Fiction	David Nicholls	Won	
2019	British Academy Television Craft Awards	Best Original Music	Hauschka	Nominated	
2019	British Academy Television Craft Awards	Best Production Design	Tom Burton	Won	
2019	British Academy Television Craft Awards	Photography & Lighting – Fiction	James Friend	Nominated	
2019	Broadcast Awards	Best Drama Series or Serial		Nominated	
2019	Broadcasting Press Guild Awards	Best Single Drama		Nominated	
2019	Broadcasting Press Guild Awards	Best Actor	Benedict Cumberbatch	Nominated	
2019	Broadcasting Press Guild Awards	Best Writer	David Nicholls	Nominated	
2019	Broadcasting Press Guild Awards	Best of Multichannel		Nominated	
2019	Camerimage	First Look Award	James Friend	Won	
2019	Golden Globe Awards	Best Actor in a Limited Series or a Motion Picture Made for Television	Benedict Cumberbatch	Nominated	
2019	Golden Reel Awards	Outstanding Achievement in Sound Editing – Sound Effects and Foley for Episodic Long Form Broadcast Media	Tony Gibson, Glen Gathard, Lewis Todd, Lilly Blazewicz, Peter Burgis, Zoe Freed, and Jason Swanscott (for "Bad News")	Nominated	
2019	Music + Sound Awards	Best Sound Design – Television Programme	Tony Gibson, Filipa Príncipe, Claire Ellis, Lewis Todd, Louisa Kearns, Stephen Smallwood, Nigel Squibbs, Jason Swanscott, Zoe Freed, and Peter Burgis	Won	
2019	Royal Television Society Awards	Best Writer – Drama	David Nicholls	Nominated	
2019	Royal Television Society Craft & Design Awards	Best Sound – Drama	Nigel Squibbs, John Mooney, Filipa Principe, and Tony Gibson	Nominated	
2019	Satellite Awards	Best Miniseries & Limited Series		Nominated	
2019	Satellite Awards	Best Actor in a Miniseries or a Motion Picture Made for Television	Benedict Cumberbatch	Nominated	
2019	Satellite Awards	Best Supporting Actor in a Series, Miniseries or a Motion Picture; Made for Television	Hugo Weaving	Won	
2019	Satellite Awards	Best Supporting Actress in a Series, Miniseries or a Motion Picture; Made for Television	Jennifer Jason Leigh	Nominated	
2019	USC Scripter Awards	Television	David Nicholls; Based on the series of novels by Edward St Aubyn	Nominated	
2020	IMAGO International Awards	Best Cinematography in TV Drama	James Friend (for "Bad News")	Won	
