= John Cazale =

American actor (1935–1978)

- Cazale in Dog Day Afternoon (1975)
- Born: John Holland Cazale; August 12, 1935; Revere, Massachusetts, U.S.
- Died: March 13, 1978 (aged 42); New York City, U.S.
- Education: Oberlin College; Boston University (BFA)
- Occupation: Actor
- Years active: 1959–1978
- Partner: Meryl Streep (1976–1978)

Signature
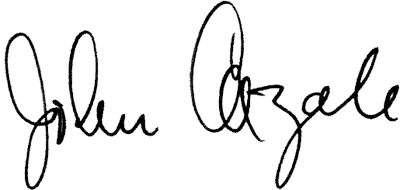

John Holland Cazale (/kəˈzæl/ kə-ZAL; August 12, 1935 – March 13, 1978^{A}) was an American actor. He appeared in five films over seven years. Cazale started as a theater actor in Boston, ranging from regional, to off-Broadway, to Broadway acting alongside Al Pacino, Meryl Streep, and Sam Waterston. Cazale soon became one of Hollywood's premier character actors, starting with his role as the doomed, weak-minded Fredo Corleone alongside longtime friend Pacino in Francis Ford Coppola's The Godfather (1972) and The Godfather Part II (1974). He also appeared in Coppola's The Conversation (1974) and Sidney Lumet's Dog Day Afternoon (1975), the latter of which earned him a Golden Globe Award nomination. In 1977, Cazale was diagnosed with lung cancer, but chose to complete his role in The Deer Hunter (1978). Shortly after filming was completed, he died in New York City on March 13, 1978, aged 42. Archive footage of Cazale in the role of Fredo appears in The Godfather Part III (1990).

Theatrical producer Joseph Papp called Cazale "an amazing intellect, an extraordinary person and a fine, dedicated artist". David Thomson writes, "It is the lives and works of people like John Cazale that make filmgoing worthwhile." A documentary tribute to Cazale, I Knew It Was You, was screened at the 2009 Sundance Film Festival featuring interviews with Pacino, Streep, Robert De Niro, Gene Hackman, Richard Dreyfuss, Francis Ford Coppola, Sidney Lumet, and Steve Buscemi. Cazale starred in five feature films in his career, with each film being nominated for the Academy Award for Best Picture.

== Early life ==
John Holland Cazale was born in Revere, Massachusetts, to John Joseph Cazale and Cecilia Holland. He had an older sister, Catherine, and a younger brother, Stephen. He grew up in Winchester and attended high school at the Buxton School in Williamstown, where he joined the drama club. He studied drama at Oberlin College in Ohio, transferring to Boston University, where he studied under Peter Kass.

== Career ==
=== Theater career ===
Upon graduation, Cazale worked as a cab driver, as he started his theatrical career at the Charles Playhouse in Boston, appearing in Hotel Paradiso and Our Town in 1959. Reviewing his performance as George Gibbs in Our Town, critic Jean Pierre Frankenhuis said: "[Cazale's] portrayal is absolutely stupendous, hilarious, touching, thrilling. We found ourselves wishing that there were more scenes with him, such is the enjoyable performance he gives: a comedian of the first order!" Cazale moved to New York City and supported himself as a photographer while looking for acting work. He made one of his first appearances there in the Equity Library's production of Sidney Howard's Paths of Glory.

An off-Broadway production of Archibald MacLeish's J.B. by the Equity Library Theatre followed on March 17, 1962, at the Master Theater. He also acted in a 1962 short film titled The American Way, directed by Marvin Starkman.

In 1965, Cazale was part of the National Tour of Lorraine Hansberry's The Sign in Sidney Brustein's Window.

He worked as a messenger at Standard Oil, where he met Al Pacino, another aspiring actor. Pacino recalled: "When I first saw John, I instantly thought he was so interesting. Everybody was always around him because he had a very congenial way of expressing himself." In 1966, the two were cast in a play by Israel Horovitz, The Indian Wants the Bronx, playing at the Eugene O'Neill Theatre Center in Waterford, Connecticut. They reprised their roles in 1968 at the off-Broadway Astor Place Theatre, for which they both won Obie Awards. That same year, Cazale won another Obie for his role as Dolan in Horovitz's Line.

In 1968, Cazale appeared in his only television role, playing Tom Andrews in the episode "The Peep Freak" on the cop drama N.Y.P.D.

In 1969, Cazale joined the Long Wharf Theatre Company, where he appeared for the next three seasons in a number of productions, including Tartuffe, The Country People, The Skin of Our Teeth, The Iceman Cometh, and You Can't Take It With You.

Cazale reprised his role in Line in a 1971 production at the Theatre De Lys. Appearing with him were Richard Dreyfuss as Stephen, Barnard Hughes as Arnall, John Randolph as Fleming, and Ann Wedgeworth as Molly. During this run, Cazale was spotted by casting director Fred Roos, who then suggested him to director Francis Ford Coppola for the role of Fredo Corleone in The Godfather (1972).

=== Film career ===
A character actor, Cazale holds the unique distinction of only appearing in feature films that were nominated for the Academy Award for Best Picture.

After appearing in a short film and an episode of the television series N.Y.P.D., Cazale made his feature film debut as Fredo Corleone in the Francis Ford Coppola-directed The Godfather (1972). Two years later, he reprised the role in The Godfather Part II. In 1974, he appeared in The Conversation, also directed by Coppola. In 1975, he starred as Salvatore Naturile opposite Pacino in the bank robbery film Dog Day Afternoon. His performance garnered him a Golden Globe nomination for Best Supporting Actor.

==== Coppola films (1972–1974) ====
The Godfather was Cazale's feature-film debut. The film's star, Marlon Brando, was one of Cazale's idols. The film broke box-office records and made Cazale and several other previously unknown co-stars famous. Coppola, impressed with Cazale's abilities in the small role, wrote the part of Stan for him in his next film, The Conversation (1974), in which he co-starred with Gene Hackman. In 1974, he reprised his role as Fredo Corleone, now significantly expanded, in The Godfather Part II. Bruce Fretts, in Entertainment Weekly, wrote, "Cazale makes his character’s wounded pride hauntingly palpable".

==== Dog Day Afternoon (1975) ====
He again starred alongside Pacino in Sidney Lumet's 1975 film Dog Day Afternoon. The film's screenwriter, Frank Pierson, said, "the film had been cast with many of the actors that Al Pacino had worked with in New York, including John Cazale, who was a close friend and collaborator in The Godfather". For his role as Sal, he was nominated for the Golden Globe Award for Best Supporting Actor. Lumet declared:

One of the things that I love about the casting of John Cazale was that he had a tremendous sadness about him. I don't know where it came from; I don't believe in invading the privacy of the actors that I work with, or getting into their heads. But, my God—it's there—every shot of him. And not just in this movie, but in Godfather II also.

=== Return to theater ===
In 1976, he starred in an off-Broadway production of Measure for Measure, opposite Meryl Streep, as well as a production of The Local Stigmatic. His final appearance on stage was as Agamemnon in the eponymous play in 1977. In 1978, he starred alongside Robert De Niro and Christopher Walken in The Deer Hunter. The film was released posthumously. A film documentary tribute to Cazale, I Knew It Was You, was screened at the 2009 Sundance Film Festival.

==== Public theater (1975–1976) ====
While achieving success in film, Cazale's commitment to the stage continued. In addition to his work with the Long Wharf Theatre, he appeared in a number of plays by Israel Horovitz. In May 1975, he returned to the Charles Playhouse to support Pacino in The Resistible Rise of Arturo Ui. Ross Wetzston of The Village Voice, reporting on the production, said Cazale "may be the finest actor in America today". In 1976, ten years after their first collaboration, Cazale and Pacino appeared together for the final time in the Public Theater's production of The Local Stigmatic.

==== Measure for Measure (1976) ====
In the summer of that year, Cazale starred at the Delacorte Theater in Central Park with Sam Waterston in Shakespeare's Measure for Measure. His leading lady was the recent Yale School of Drama graduate Meryl Streep. Mel Gussow of The New York Times wrote: "Mr. Cazale, often cast as a quirky, weak outsider, as in The Godfather, here demonstrates sterner mettle as a quietly imperious Angelo who sweeps down, vulture-like, to deposit virtue." During the run of the play, Cazale and Streep began a romance and moved in together. Streep humorously praised her co-star's abilities by saying, "The jerk made everything mean something." Then she added, "Such good judgment, such uncluttered thought!".

==== Agamemnon (1977) ====
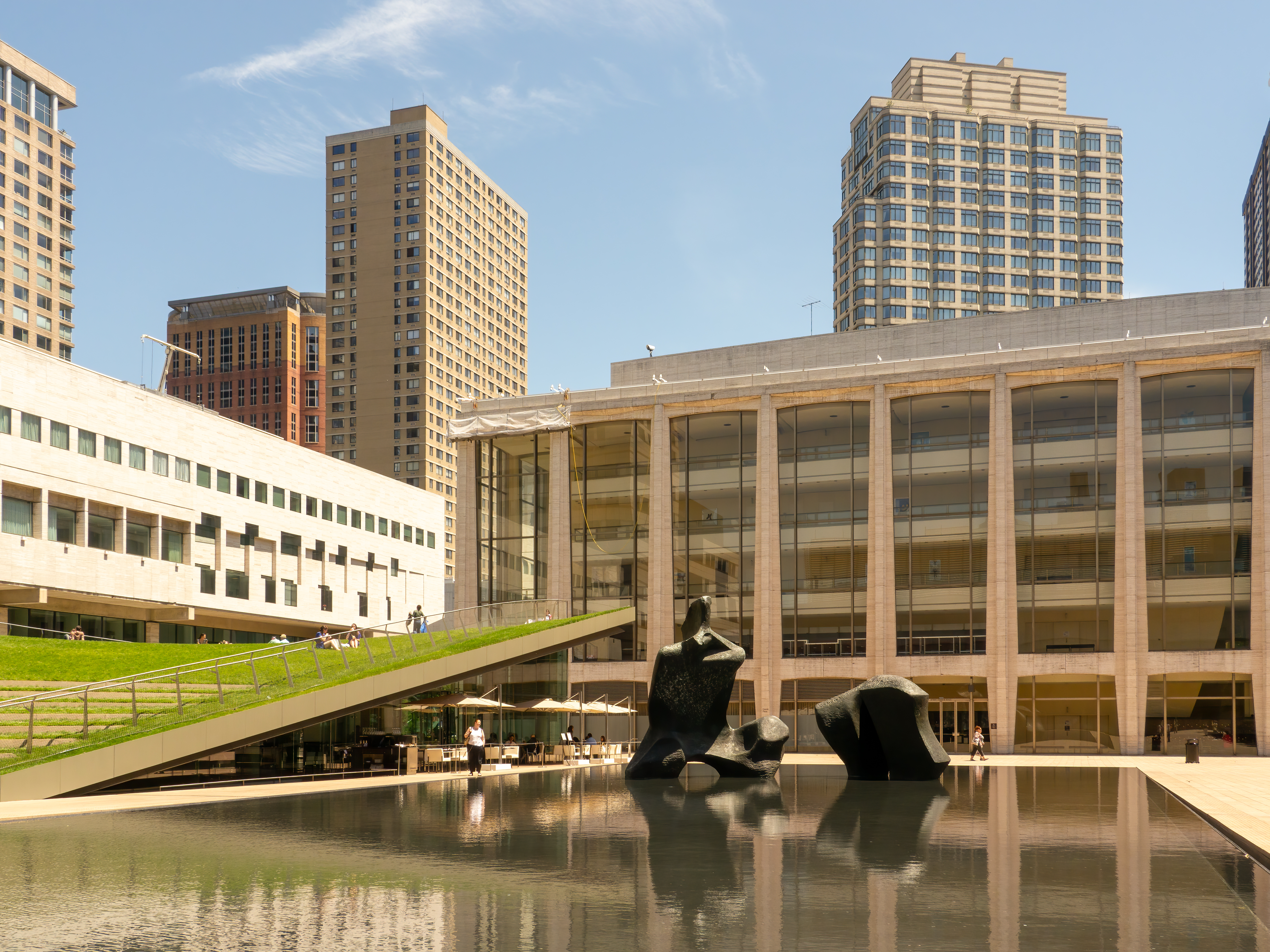
Cazale's final theatre performance was at the Vivian Beaumont Theatre (pictured).

Cazale's final stage appearance was on April 29, 1977, in the title role of Agamemnon at the Vivian Beaumont Theater. He appeared only in the first preview. After the performance, he became ill and withdrew from the show. It was his only Broadway performance. Shortly afterwards, he was diagnosed with lung cancer.

=== Final film role: The Deer Hunter (1978) ===
Despite the terminal-disease diagnosis, Cazale continued work with his romantic partner, Meryl Streep, along with Robert De Niro, Christopher Walken, and John Savage in The Deer Hunter. According to author Andy Dougan, director Michael Cimino "rearranged the shooting schedule with Cazale and Streep's consent, so that he could film all his scenes first". He completed his scenes, but died before the film was released. Cazale was considered all but uninsurable due to his illness, jeopardizing his participation in the film, but according to Streep, the costs were paid by De Niro, who wanted Cazale to be in it.

== Death ==
Cazale was diagnosed with lung cancer in 1977, likely related to his history of chain smoking. Despite trying a number of treatments and protocols, he rapidly declined as the cancer metastasized to his bones. Cazale died at the age of 42 in the early hours of March 13, 1978. Meryl Streep, with whom he had been living, was at his side, as the actress had been throughout his illness. Close friend and Godfather co-star Al Pacino said, "I've hardly ever seen a person [Streep] so devoted to someone who is falling away like John was. To see her in that act of love for this man was overwhelming." Pacino later lamented that Cazale was not better recognized for his skill, saying that Cazale "was one of the great actors of our time—that time, any time."

Cazale's close friend and frequent collaborator, Israel Horovitz, wrote a eulogy, published in The Village Voice on March 27, 1978. In it, he said:

John Cazale happens once in a lifetime. He was an invention, a small perfection. It is no wonder his friends feel such anger upon waking from their sleep to discover that Cazale sleeps on with kings and counselors, with Booth and Kean, with Jimmy Dean, with Bernhardt, Guitry, and Duse, with Stanislavsky, with Groucho, Benny, and Allen. He will make fast friends in his new place. He is easy to love.

Cazale was buried at Holy Cross Cemetery in Malden, Massachusetts.

== Filmography ==
Year	Title	Role	Director	Notes
1962	The American Way	Beatnik	Marvin Starkman	Short film
1968	N.Y.P.D.	Tom Andrews	David Pressman	Episode: "The Peep Freak"
1972	The Godfather	Fredo Corleone	Francis Ford Coppola	
1974	The Conversation	Stan	Francis Ford Coppola	
1974	The Godfather Part II	Fredo Corleone	Francis Ford Coppola	
1975	Dog Day Afternoon	Salvatore Naturile	Sidney Lumet	
1978	The Deer Hunter	Stan Stosh	Michael Cimino	Posthumous release; final film role

== Theater credits ==
Year	Title	Role	Theater
1962	J.B	Performer	Master Theater, New York
1968	The Indian Wants the Bronx	Gupta	Astor Place Theatre, Off-Broadway
1968	It's Called the Sugar Plum	East Indian	Astor Place Theatre, Off-Broadway
1969	Line	Dolan	Astor Place Theatre, Off-Broadway
1970	Spoon River Anthology	Performer	Long Wharf Theatre, Off-Broadway
1970	Country People	Vassya	Long Wharf Theatre, Off-Broadway
1970	Black Comedy & The White Liars	Performer	Long Wharf Theatre, Off-Broadway
1971	Acrobats & Line	Dolan (line)	Lucille Lortel Theatre, Off-Broadway
1972	The Iceman Cometh	Performer	Long Wharf Theatre, Off-Broadway
1973	Alfred The Great	Will	Pittsburgh Playhouse, Off-Broadway
1975	The Resistible Rise of Arturo Ui	Performer	The Public Theater, Off-Broadway
1976	The Local Stigmatic	The Public Theater, Off-Broadway	
1976	Measure for Measure	Angelo	Delacorte Theater, Off-Broadway
1977	Agamemnon	Agamemnon / Aegisthu. Replaced by Jamil Zakkai after first preview	Vivian Beaumont Theater, Broadway

== Awards and nominations ==
Cazale was awarded twice for "Distinguished Performance" by the Off-Broadway Obie Awards in the 1967−1968 season for his performances in Israel Horovitz's plays The Indian Wants the Bronx and Line. His only major film acting recognition came in 1976, when he was nominated for a Golden Globe for Best Supporting Actor for Dog Day Afternoon. He lost to Richard Benjamin, who won the award for his work in The Sunshine Boys.

Although Cazale never received an Oscar nomination, according to Bruce Fretts, he "was the walking embodiment of the aphorism, 'acting is reacting', providing the perfect counterbalance to his recurring co-stars, the more emotionally volatile Al Pacino and Robert De Niro". Cazale had learned to put the lack of recognition into context. While filming The Deer Hunter, he said to Pittsburgh Press reporter Edward L. Blank:

If you have any inclination toward paranoia, that sort of thing will bring it out in you. You say to yourself, "What do I have to do to get recognition of that sort?" Then you put it back into perspective and ask yourself how much that or any award really matters.

== Legacy ==
Cazale was described by those close to him to be "often shy" and "very emotionally sensitive". He collaborated with a number of artists repeatedly: Israel Horovitz dedicated the entire cycle of his "Wakefield Plays" to Cazale's memory, saying he "played in most of my plays, from 67–77, including Alfred the Great and Our Father's Failing". Directors James Hammerstein and Arvin Brown used him multiple times. He did two plays for Joseph Papp. Francis Ford Coppola was responsible for the majority of Cazale's film roles, having cast him three times. Meryl Streep acted with him twice. Close friend and frequent co-star Al Pacino collaborated with him six times: on three films and three stage productions. Pacino once commented: "All I wanted to do was work with John for the rest of my life. He was my acting partner."

In an interview celebrating The Godfather 50th anniversary, when asked about actors that did not get enough credit, Al Pacino said:

John Cazale, in general, was one of the great actors of our time — that time, any time. I learned so much from him. I had done a lot of theater and three films with him. He was inspiring, he just was. And he didn't get credit for any of it. He was in five films, all Oscar-nominated films, and he was great in all of them. He was particularly great in Godfather II and I don't think he got that kind of recognition.

In following generations, celebrated actors such as Philip Seymour Hoffman, Steve Buscemi, Sam Rockwell, and Michael Fassbender named Cazale as an influence.

The Boston Globe asked: "Why was Cazale so influential? In part, it was because of his commitment to the craft of acting." To Streep, he was "monomaniacal", which had an effect on his co-stars, who were then "challenged to take their own games up a notch".

The McGinn/Cazale Theater in New York City is co-named for Cazale and his friend, the actor Walter McGinn, who had died in a car accident in 1977. The theater was dedicated on March 12, 1984.

His life and career were profiled in the documentary film, I Knew It Was You, directed by Richard Shepard, which premiered at the 2009 Sundance Film Festival.

== Notes ==
A. Cazale died at approximately 3 a.m. on Monday, March 13, 1978, which is the date on his gravestone and confirmed by his brother, Stephen. His date of death has been commonly reported as March 12, 1978, due to contemporary newspaper reports referencing his death occurring on "Sunday night".
