= The Indian Wants the Bronx =

One-act play by Israel Horovitz

The Indian Wants the Bronx is a one-act play by Israel Horovitz.

Gupta, the Indian of the title, has just arrived in New York City from his native country to visit his son and speaks only a few words of English. While waiting for a bus to The Bronx, he is approached by two young punks, Joey and Murph, who begin teasing him. Name-calling taunts eventually result in acts of rage and violence.

The play premiered in 1966 at the Eugene O'Neill Theater Center in Waterford, Connecticut. Al Pacino and John Cazale starred; it was the first of six collaborations between them. Cazale was cast after the original actor, an Indian, was judged not to be able to handle the role. Horovitz later wrote on the subject, "True, John's Italian, not Hindu… from Winchester, Massachusetts, not Delhi. But it's also true that John Cazale is a fine, sensitive actor."

The play was staged in conjunction with the playwright's It's Called the Sugar Plum by James Hammerstein as the opening production of the new off-Broadway Astor Place Theatre, where it opened on January 17, 1968 and ran for 177 performances. The cast included Al Pacino, Marsha Mason, John Cazale, and Matthew Cowles. It won the Obie Award for Best Play, Best Actor (Pacino), and Best Supporting Actor (Cazale).

In 1976, the play was mounted by the Chicago theatre company Steppenwolf as part of its first full season. The production was directed by John Malkovich and starred Terry Kinney, Gary Sinise, and H.E. Baccus.
