= Rachael Horovitz =

American film producer (born 1962)

- Born: 1962 (age 63–64); New York City, U.S.
- Education: University of North Carolina at Chapel Hill; Phillips Academy Andover
- Occupation: Film producer
- Known for: Moneyball; Patrick Melrose
- Spouse: Michael Jackson
- Awards: AFI Movie of the Year; Critics Choice Award for Best Adapted Screenplay.

Rachael Horovitz (born 1962) is an American film producer. She is known for producing the film Moneyball, and the miniseries Patrick Melrose.

== Early life ==
Horovitz is the daughter of playwright Israel Horovitz and the late painter Doris (née Keefe), and the sister of the musician Adam Horovitz. Her father is Jewish, whereas her mother, who was of Irish descent, was Catholic.

Raised in Greenwich Village in an eclectic household filled with artists, musicians, writers, and seamstresses, Horovitz graduated from Phillips Academy Andover. She also attended the University of North Carolina at Chapel Hill where she was a member of St. Anthony Hall. After college, she lived in Paris where, at the suggestion of family friend playwright Samuel Beckett, she went to work at Shakespeare and Co. bookstore on the Left Bank. Following her return to New York, she worked in Mayor Edward I. Koch's administration as an assistant to Parks Commissioner Henry J. Stern.

== Career ==
Horovitz began working in film in 1985 when she was hired to work at Dino De Laurentiis Productions in publicity. While at the company, she worked on campaigns for David Lynch's Blue Velvet, Michael Cimino's The Sicilian and Roman Polanski's Pirates, among other films.

In 1988 she began producing short works by young playwrights such as Kenneth Lonergan and Jon Robin Baitz at the Naked Angels theatre company, and also produced the Rushmore Festival, known for its commissions of new American translations of classical plays. During her tenure, she commissioned and produced the award-winning Paul Schmidt translation of Anton Chekov's The Cherry Orchard, which had its premiere at the festival. Horovitz's film projects at that time included developing screenplays with emerging writer/directors Lonergan, Noah Baumbach and Brad Anderson. In 1990, Horovitz produced her first feature, No Telling. She also developed and co-produced Next Stop Wonderland.

Horovitz joined New Line Cinema as Vice President of Fine Line Features where she developed Wes Anderson and Owen Wilson's screenplay Rushmore. She and acquired dozens of films including works by Woody Allen, Bernardo Bertolucci and Michel Gondry. She was also responsible for bringing into the company and supervising award-winning comedy State and Main, which she co-produced, as well as About Schmidt, which she executive produced. The film won Golden Globe Awards for Nicholson and the screenplay, and was nominated for two Academy Awards.

In 2001, Horovitz left New Line to work as a senior executive in Revolution Studios' New York office. While there, she worked closely with Julia Roberts' production company on such projects as Mona Lisa Smile and Maid in Manhattan. She was involved in films as Little Black Book (executive producer), Next Stop Wonderland (co-producer), No Telling (producer), and Samantha: An American Girl Holiday (executive producer).

Horovitz formed Specialty Films her own production company in 2003. She was the executive producer of HBO's Grey Gardens for which she received an Emmy Award, a Golden Globe Award, the Broadcast and Television Critics Awards for best film, and the 2010 David Wolper Producer of the Year Award from the Producers Guild. The film stars Drew Barrymore and Jessica Lange and won major awards for both actresses.

The first big-screen project she put into development via Specialty Films was Michael Lewis' best-selling book Moneyball, which she set up at Sony Pictures in 2004. The film was directed by Bennett Miller in 2010 and was released in September 2011, starring Brad Pitt and Jonah Hill. It was nominated for six Oscars. It was an AFI Movie of the Year and won the Critics Choice Award for Best Adapted Screenplay.

Around 2012, she began a partnership with her father on the movie My Old Lady (2014). Horovitz was producer and her father, Israel Horovitz, was director. Her 2018 production for Showtime/Sky Atlantic was the Patrick Melrose miniseries starring Benedict Cumberbatch. It won a BAFTA award for best miniseries.

== Honors ==
In 2012, Horovitz received an award from the Athena Film Festival at Barnard College in New York City for her exceptional talents as a Motion Picture Producer.

== Personal life ==
She is the partner of British television executive Michael Jackson, with whom she has twin sons, Eli and Joe. They live in New York City, but have been in London since 2017.

Active in New York City and its causes throughout her working life, Horovitz has served for many years on the Board of Directors of the Ghetto Film School and Maysles Documentary Center in Harlem, through which she helped found in 2009 The Cinema School, the country's first public high school specializing in film.
