= The Local Stigmatic =

- Directed by: David F. Wheeler
- Screenplay by: Heathcote Williams
- Based on: The Local Stigmatic by Heathcote Williams
- Produced by: Michael Hadge
- Starring: Al Pacino; Paul Guilfoyle; Joseph Maher
- Cinematography: Edward Lachman
- Edited by: Norman Hollyn
- Music by: Howard Shore
- Release date: 19 September 1990
- Running time: 54 minutes
- Country: United States
- Language: English

The Local Stigmatic is a 1990 film directed by David Wheeler, produced by and starring Al Pacino. It was filmed and edited during the late 1980s. It had a showing at the Museum of Modern Art in New York City in March 1990, but was never released theatrically. It was released on DVD as part of The Al Pacino Box Set in June 2007. The film is 54 minutes in length.

It follows the story of two British friends who spend their time walking around London discussing dog-track racing.

The Local Stigmatic is based on a stage play by Heathcote Williams.

== Plot ==
Two men sit in a bar and engage in a conversation about their lives, friendships, and their feelings of being overlooked and misunderstood by society. They are disillusioned with the world around them and are consumed by bitterness.

The two friends dream of committing acts of violence against those whom they see as symbols of their frustration and alienation. Their fixation on a local celebrity, who becomes a target of their anger, leads them down a dark path that explores themes of identity, social alienation, and the desire for recognition.

== Cast ==
- Al Pacino - Graham
- Paul Guilfoyle - Ray
- Joseph Maher - David

== Reception ==
The movie was not a critical success.
