= Larry Bryggman =

American actor (born 1938)

- Born: Arvid Laurence Bryggman; December 21, 1938 (age 87); Concord, California, U.S.
- Occupation: Actor
- Years active: 1962–present
- Spouses: Barbara Creed (m. 1962; div. 1982) Jacqueline Schultz (m. 1982; div. 1987) Tracey Hanley (m. 1999)
- Children: 5

Arvid Laurence Bryggman (born December 21, 1938) is an American actor. He is known for playing the role of Dr. John Dixon on the CBS Daytime soap opera As the World Turns (1969 to 2004, 2010). He won the Daytime Emmy Award for Outstanding Lead Actor in a Drama Series for his work on As the World Turns in 1984 and 1987. He received six other Daytime Emmy Award nominations. He has had roles in many theatrical productions, including Ulysses in Nighttown (1974), The Basic Training of Pavlo Hummel (1977), Prelude to a Kiss (1990), Picnic (1994), Proof (2000), Romance (2005), Festen (2006), and Harvey (2012). He has received two Tony Award nominations and won two Obie Awards. He has also appeared in the films ...And Justice for All (1979), Hanky Panky (1982), Die Hard with a Vengeance (1995) and Spy Game (2001).

== Early life ==
Bryggman was born on December 21, 1938 in Concord, California. He was raised in Oakland. He is of Swedish descent. His father worked for a neon sign company and his mother was a piano teacher. Bryggman learned to play the piano, drums and various woodwinds, including the bassoon. He also learned to play the accordion, at his father's request.

He graduated from Piedmont High School. He attended the City College of San Francisco, earning a Bachelor's Degree.

== Career ==
=== 1959-1969: As the World Turns ===
Bryggman moved to New York in 1959. In the early 1960s, he co-starred with Mildred Dunnock and Albert Dekker in a touring production of Death of a Salesman. He made his off-Broadway debut in 1962, appearing on stage in A Summer Ghost. He played a police sergeant in Live Like Pigs and Pozzo in Waiting for Godot, both produced by the Theater Company of Boston. He spent five years as a principal member of the company.

In 1969, Bryggman made his debut at the New York Shakespeare Festival, performing in Mod Donna. He co-starred with Elke Sommer in a touring production of the musical Irma La Douce. On television, he had a brief role on Love Is a Many Splendored Thing.

Bryggman was cast as Dr. John Dixon on the CBS soap opera As the World Turns, first airing on July 18, 1969. He was initially only supposed to appear in three episodes, but the show's producers saw potential in the character and he was offered a contract. In his early years on the show, John was a villain who blackmailed and raped his wife, Kim Sullivan Hughes (then known as Kim Dixon). Bryggman was confronted by angry fans when he was out in public, including a woman who almost hit him in front a supermarket. The character was eventually redeemed and became a trusted doctor in the fictional city of Oakdale.

=== 1972-1979: ...And Justice for All ===
Bryggman appeared on Broadway in The Lincoln Mask in 1972. He also appeared in the short film The Witches of Salem: The Horror and the Hope (1972). In 1974, he had multiple roles in the Broadway play Ulysses in Nighttown, directed by Burgess Meredith and co-starring Zero Mostel. He had a role in the television film Strike Force (1975). He played Dr. Sheldon Henning in the original Broadway production of Checking Out. The play ran from September 14 to September 25, 1976 at the Longacre Theatre in New York.

In February 1977, Bryggman played Frank Schaeffer in Marco Polo Sings a Solo at The Public Theater, co-starring with Madeline Kahn. He played Kress in a Broadway revival of The Basic Training of Pavlo Hummel, co-starring with Al Pacino. The play ran from April 24 to September 3, 1977 at the Longacre Theatre. In December 1977, he appeared in Two Small Bodies at Playwrights Horizons.

In February 1978, he played the Guard in the play Museum at The Public Theater. He was cast as Lord Stanley, Earl of Derby in a Broadway revival of Richard III, co-starring again with Al Pacino. The play ran from June 10 to July 15, 1979 at the Cort Theatre. Bryggman played Warren Fresnell in the drama film ...And Justice for All (1979), co-starring with Pacino a third time. In October 1979, he played Fool in The Winter Dancers at the Phoenix Theatre.

=== 1981-1987: Hanky Panky ===
In 1981, he was nominated for a Daytime Emmy Award for Outstanding Lead Actor in a Drama Series for his work on As the World Turns. In November 1981, he appeared in The Resurrection of Lady Lester at the Manhattan Theatre Club. For his work on As the World Turns, he received another Daytime Emmy Award nomination for Outstanding Lead Actor in a Drama Series in 1982. Bryggman played Stacy in the comedy film Hanky Panky (1982), directed by Sidney Poitier and co-starring with Gene Wilder and Gilda Radner. In January 1983, he played Arturo in The Modern Ladies of Guanabacoa at the Ensemble Studio Theatre.

In 1984, Bryggman won a Daytime Emmy Award for Outstanding Lead Actor in a Drama Series for his work on As the World Turns. In November 1984, he appeared in The Ballad of Soapy Smith at The Public Theater. In March 1985, Bryggman appeared as Bijou in the play Walk the Dog, Willie. In May 1985, he played Hank in Life Under Water at the Ensemble Studio Theatre, co-starring with Jill Eikenberry. Bryggman received another Daytime Emmy Award nomination for Outstanding Lead Actor in a Drama Series, for his work on As the World Turns.

He appeared in Rum and Coke at The Public Theater in January 1986. He was nominated again for a Daytime Emmy Award for Outstanding Lead Actor in a Drama Series for his work on As the World Turns. In December 1986, he played multiple roles in Bodies, Rest and Motion at the Newhouse Theater. In 1987, Bryggman won the Daytime Emmy Award for Outstanding Lead Actor in a Drama Series for his work on ATWT. In November 1987, he appeared in Blood Sports at the Perry Street Theater in New York.

=== 1988-1994: Picnic ===
In May 1988, Bryggman appeared as Andrew in the play Spoils of War, co-starring with Kate Nelligan. In November 1988, he played Sicinius Vellutus in Coriolanus at The Public Theater, co-starring with Christopher Walken. In 1988 and 1989, he received Daytime Emmy Award nominations for Outstanding Lead Actor in a Drama Series for his work on As the World Turns.

In January 1990, he played Banquo in Macbeth at The Public Theater. He played Dr. Boyle in the original Broadway production of Prelude to a Kiss, co-starring with Mary-Louise Parker. The play ran from April 29 to May 19, 1990 at the Hayes Theater. In February 1991, he played the title role in Henry IV, Part 1 and Henry IV, Part 2 at The Public Theater. In October 1991, he appeared as Robert Mohr in the play The White Rose. In July 1992, he played Duke Frederick in As You Like It at the Delacorte Theater.

In 1993, he received an Obie Award for Sustained Excellence of Work for his theatrical performances. Bryggman was cast as Howard Bevans in the original Broadway production of Picnic, co-starring with Ashley Judd and Kyle Chandler. The play ran from March 30 to May 29, 1994 at Criterion Center Stage Right. For his work in the show, he was nominated for a Tony Award for Best Featured Actor in a Play.

=== 1995-2001: Proof ===
In July 1995, he played Alonso in The Tempest at the Delacorte Theater. He appeared as Arthur Cobb in the action film Die Hard with a Vengeance, co-starring with Bruce Willis. Bryggman played twins Harry and Alfred Baker in New England at the Manhattan Theatre Club in November 1995. He played Tom in The Ride Down Mount Morgan at the Williamstown Theatre Festival in July 1996. Bryggman appeared in the film Looking for Richard, written and directed by Al Pacino.

In July 1997, Bryggman played the Duke of Buckingham in Henry VIII at The Public Theater. In June 1998, he appeared as Herman Glogauer in Once in a Lifetime for the Atlantic Theater Company. In November 1998, he played Ray Armstrong in Wolf Lullaby for the same company. He appeared in The Hothouse, another production for the Atlantic Theater Company, in February 1999.

Bryggman was cast as Robert in the original Broadway production of Proof, co-starring again with Mary-Louise Parker. The play opened in previews on October 10, 2000 at the Walter Kerr Theatre. Bryggman left the production on June 10, 2001. He was replaced in the role with Patrick Tovatt, his As the World Turns co-star. For his work in the show, Bryggman was nominated for a Tony Award for Best Featured Actor in a Play. He was also nominated for an Outer Critics Circle Award for Outstanding Featured Actor in a Play. In 2001, he also appeared as Troy Folger in the action film Spy Game, co-starring with Robert Redford and Brad Pitt. He guest starred on Law & Order.

=== 2003-2005: Leaving ATWT ===
In June 2003, he played Emil in A Bad Friend at the Mitzi E. Newhouse Theater. He guest starred on Law & Order: Special Victims Unit in 2003. He starred as Jon in Roulette at the John Houseman Theater in February 2004. In October 2004, he appeared in Twelve Angry Men at the American Airlines Theatre.

In December 2004, it was announced that Bryggman would be leaving the role of John Dixon on As the World Turns. Due to budget cuts, he had reportedly been offered recurring status, which he declined. His last airdate was December 14, 2004. In June 2005, he played Gayev in The Cherry Orchard for the Atlantic Theater Company.

In 2005, Bryggman starred as the Judge in the Atlantic Theater Company's off-Broadway and Los Angeles productions of the David Mamet farce Romance. For his work in the play, he was nominated for a Drama Desk Award for Outstanding Featured Actor in a Play. He also received an Outer Critics Circle Award nomination for Outstanding Featured Actor in a Play and won an Obie Award.

=== 2006-present ===
He returned to Broadway, starring as Helge in an original production of Festen. The play ran from March 23, 2006 to May 20, 2006 at the Music Box Theatre. He co-starred with Julianna Margulies. In March 2007, he played the Earl of Gloucester in King Lear at The Public Theater. In July 2007, he starred as Hank in Surface to Air at Symphony Space. In June 2008, he played the Man in Occupant at the Peter Norton Space, co-starring with Mercedes Ruehl. He co-starred with Debra Monk in Mrs. Miller Does Her Thing at the Vineyard Playhouse in September 2008.

He played Salty in the comedy film Side by Each (2008), co-starring with Blythe Danner. In May 2009, he appeared as Smith in the play Groundswell. In March 2010, he appeared in Top Secret: The Battle for the Pentagon Papers at the New York Theatre Workshop. Beginning on August 27, 2010, Bryggman returned to ATWT for 12 of the final 16 episodes, as the show finished its run on September 17, 2010. For these final episodes of the series, it was explained that Dixon had been working at Johns Hopkins for an undisclosed period of time, but had been asked by Dr. Reid Oliver to return to Oakdale Memorial to consult on the ailing Christopher Hughes.

In November 2010, Bryggman starred in Harold Pinter's The Collection and A Kind of Alaska at the Classic Stage Company. In June 2011, he performed in the Atlantic Theater Company's 10x25 festival of ten-minute plays. He guest starred on The Good Wife in 2011. He starred in CQ/CX at the Peter Norton Space in February 2012. Bryggman played Judge Omar Gaffney in a Broadway revival of Harvey, co-starring with Jim Parsons. The play ran from May 18, 2012 to August 5, 2012 at Studio 54.

Bryggman starred as Lyman Wyeth in Other Desert Cities at Washington, D.C.'s Arena Stage in May 2013. He guest starred on Person of Interest in 2013. In December 2013, he joined a play reading of Alexander Ostrovsky's Too Clever By Half, co-starring with Jonathan Groff and Grace Gummer. Bryggman appeared in Father Comes Home From the Wars at The Public Theater in March 2014. In February 2017, he starred as Lou in the play If I Forget for the Roundabout Theatre Company. The production was recorded by BroadwayHD and became available On Demand. Bryggman guest starred on The Blacklist and Law & Order: Special Victims Unit in 2019.

== Personal life ==
In 1960, Bryggman had a relationship with a woman he met while working in summer theater in Massachusetts. They had a daughter, whom he first met when she came to see him perform in The Basic Training of Pavlo Hummel in 1977.

He was married to dancer Barbara Creed and they had two sons, born in 1966 and 1970. They later divorced.

Bryggman married his As the World Turns co-star, Jacqueline Schultz, in 1982. They divorced in 1987.

He married Tracey Hanley Bryggman, an assistant director on Guiding Light, in the late 1990s. They have a son, born in 2000, and a daughter, born in 2003.

== Filmography ==
=== Film ===
Year	Title	Role	Notes
1971	The One Arm Bandit	Man with Briefcase	Short film
1972	The Witches of Salem: The Horror and the Hope	Reverend Burroughs	Short film
1979	...And Justice For All	Warren Fresnell	
1982	Hanky Panky	Stacy	
1995	Die Hard with a Vengeance	Walter Cobb	
1996	Looking for Richard	Himself/Lord Stanley	
2000	Crash Pad!	The Husband	Short film
2001	Spy Game	Troy Folger	
2008	Side by Each	Salty	
2013	Blood from a Stoner	Bernard	Short film
2017	If I Forget	Lou Fischer	
2018	Family Games	Roan	
2024	Poems Without Words	Husband	Short film collection

=== Television ===
Year	Title	Role	Notes
1969–2004; 2010	As the World Turns	Dr. John Dixon	Contract role: 1969–2004, Recurring role: 2010
1975	Strike Force	Pharmacist	Television film Uncredited
2001	Law & Order	Defense Attorney Rowan	Episode: "Myth of Fingerprints"
2003; 2019	Law & Order: Special Victims Unit	Defense Attorney Rowan; D.A. Patrick Keane	Episodes: "Mercy", "Murdered at a Bad Address"
2011	The Good Wife	Professor Noah Fineman	Episode: "A New Day"
2013	Person of Interest	Martin Baxter	Episode: "Trojan Horse"
2016	Crisis in Six Scenes	Doctor	Miniseries
2019	The Blacklist	Rod Uhlman	Episode: "The Pawnbrokers (No. 146/147)"
2021	New Amsterdam	George Helms	Episode: "The Legend of Howie Cournemeyer"

== Awards and nominations ==
Year	Award	Category	Title	Result	Ref.
1981	Daytime Emmy Award	Outstanding Lead Actor in a Drama Series	As the World Turns	Nominated	
1982	Daytime Emmy Award	Outstanding Lead Actor in a Drama Series	As the World Turns	Nominated	
1984	Daytime Emmy Award	Outstanding Lead Actor in a Drama Series	As the World Turns	Won	
1985	Daytime Emmy Award	Outstanding Lead Actor in a Drama Series	As the World Turns	Nominated	
1986	Daytime Emmy Award	Outstanding Lead Actor in a Drama Series	As the World Turns	Nominated	
1986	Soap Opera Digest Award	Outstanding Contribution by an Actor/Actress in a Continuing Drama on a Daytime Serial	As the World Turns	Nominated	
1986	Soap Opera Digest Award	Outstanding Villain on a Daytime Serial	As the World Turns	Nominated	
1986	Soap Opera Digest Award	Outstanding Actor in a Leading Role on a Daytime Serial	As the World Turns	Nominated	
1987	Daytime Emmy Award	Outstanding Lead Actor in a Drama Series	As the World Turns	Won	
1988	Daytime Emmy Award	Outstanding Lead Actor in a Drama Series	As the World Turns	Nominated	
1988	Soap Opera Digest Award	Outstanding Actor in a Leading Role: Daytime	As the World Turns	Nominated	
1989	Daytime Emmy Award	Outstanding Lead Actor in a Drama Series	As the World Turns	Nominated	
1989	Soap Opera Digest Award	Outstanding Actor in a Leading Role: Daytime	As the World Turns	Nominated	
1991	Soap Opera Digest Award	Outstanding Lead Actor: Daytime	As the World Turns	Nominated	
1993	Obie Award	Sustained Excellence of Work		Won	
1994	Tony Award	Best Featured Actor in a Play	Picnic	Nominated	
2001	Outer Critics Circle Award	Outstanding Featured Actor in a Play	Proof	Nominated	
2001	Tony Award	Best Featured Actor in a Play	Proof	Nominated	
2005	Outer Critics Circle Award	Outstanding Featured Actor in a Play	Romance	Nominated	
2005	Drama Desk Award	Outstanding Featured Actor in a Play	Romance	Nominated	
2005	Obie Award	Performance	Romance	Won	
