= Richard Shepard =

American screenwriter (born 1965)

- Born: 1965 (age 60–61); New York City, New York, U.S.
- Occupations: Director, writer, producer
- Partner: Jennifer Konner

Richard Shepard (born 1965) is an American film and television director and screenwriter.

== Biography ==
Shepard was born in New York City, New York. Shepard's father was from an Austro-Hungarian-Jewish background and his mother was of Armenian descent.

In 2007, Shepard received a Directors Guild of America Award and an Emmy Award for Outstanding Directing for the television pilot for Ugly Betty. Shepard's next film, The Perfection, was financed by Miramax, and started its production in early 2018. It was released in 2019 by Netflix.

== Filmography ==
Film

Year	Title	Director	Writer	Producer	Notes
1989	Cool Blue	Yes	Yes	No	Co-directed with Mark Mullin
1991	The Linguini Incident	Yes	Yes	No	
1995	Mercy	Yes	Yes	Yes	
1997	Below Utopia	No	Yes	No	aka Body Count
1999	Oxygen	Yes	Yes	Yes	
2000	Mexico City	Yes	Yes	Yes	
2005	The Matador	Yes	Yes	No	
2007	The Hunting Party	Yes	Yes	No	
2013	Dom Hemingway	Yes	Yes	No	
2018	The Perfection	Yes	Yes	Yes	

Documentary film

Year	Title	Director	Producer	Writer
2009	I Knew It Was You	Yes	Yes	No
2023	Film Geek	Yes	Yes	Yes

Television

Year	Title	Director	Executive Producer	Notes
1996	The Royale	Yes	No	TV movie
2001	Class Warfare	Yes	No	TV movie
2006	Ugly Betty	Yes	No	Episode "Pilot"; Primetime Emmy Award for Outstanding Directing for a Comedy Series
2008	30 Rock	Yes	No	Episode 210
2011	Danni Lowinski	Yes	No	Unaired pilot
2011	Ringer	Yes	Yes	Episode "Pilot"
2013	Girls	Yes	No	12 episodes
2013	Golden Boy	Yes	Yes	Episode "Pilot"
2014	Salem	Yes	Yes	Episode "The Vow"
2018	Sweetbitter	Yes	Yes	Episode "Salt"
2019	The Twilight Zone	Yes	No	Episode "The Wunderkind"
2020	Zoey's Extraordinary Playlist	Yes	Yes	Episode "Pilot", film "Zoey's Extraordinary Christmas"
2021	The Handmaid's Tale	Yes	No	Episodes "Vows" and "Home"
2021	Acapulco	Yes	Yes	Episode "Pilot"
2022	Welcome to Chippendales	Yes	No	Episodes "Paper Is Paper" and "Switzerland"
TBA	Blank Slate	Yes	Yes	Episode "Pilot"
