= Carlito's Way: Rise to Power =

2005 American film

- Promotional poster
- Directed by: Michael Bregman
- Screenplay by: Michael Bregman
- Based on: Carlito's Way by Edwin Torres
- Produced by: Martin Bregman
- Starring: Jay Hernandez; Mario Van Peebles; Luis Guzmán; Sean Combs
- Cinematography: Adam Holender
- Edited by: David Ray
- Music by: Joe Delia
- Production companies: Rogue Pictures; Gravesend Pictures; Martin Bregman Productions
- Distributed by: Universal Pictures
- Release date: September 7, 2005
- Running time: 93 minutes
- Country: United States
- Language: English
- Budget: $9 million

Carlito's Way: Rise to Power is a 2005 prequel to Brian De Palma's 1993 film Carlito's Way. It is based on the 1975 novel Carlito's Way by Edwin Torres. The previous film was based on the 1979 Torres novel After Hours, but was retitled to avoid confusion with Martin Scorsese’s 1985 film of the same name. The film was written and directed by Michael Bregman, who produced the first film. His father, Martin Bregman, produced both films. The film was released in limited theaters 20 days prior to being released on DVD.

Carlito's Way: Rise to Power stars Jay Hernandez as Carlito Brigante, and chronicles Brigante's rise as a heroin dealer in 1960s Harlem, New York. The film also features Mario Van Peebles, Michael Joseph Kelly, Luis Guzmán, Jaclyn DeSantis, Sean Combs, Burt Young, and Domenick Lombardozzi.

Critically panned, the film nevertheless received Torres' commendation as an accurate adaptation of the first half of his novel.

== Plot ==
The story begins in the 1960s with three inmates in a New York prison — Earl (Van Peebles), Rocco (Kelly), and Carlito (Hernandez) — controlling their criminal empire within their cell. Upon their release, they all look to control the drug trade in Harlem, which is currently in a power dispute between the Italian Bottolota crime family and black gangsters led by Hollywood Nicky (Combs). Rocco takes them to Artie Bottolota (Young) who at first is reluctant to work with blacks and Puerto Ricans, but who eventually cuts a deal with them in heroin distribution. The friends also meet Artie's son, Artie Jr. Soon, Earl's troubled younger brother Reggie joins them. It does not take long for Reggie to cause trouble; eventually endangering both himself and Carlito's deal with the Bottolotas.

Artie Jr. attempts to kill Reggie with a straight razor, while Carlito is restrained. Rocco pulls up and tells Artie Jr. to let him go, reasoning they will "take care of him." Carlito also meets a young lady named Leticia and meets her brother Sigfredo. Sigfredo knows who and what Carlito really is, which leads to confrontation. Carlito eventually proves himself to Leticia's family, but Sigfredo leaves.

Reggie, after being kicked off the crew by Carlito, attacks and kidnaps Artie Jr. outside of his house, with the help of two other thugs. After Reggie gets the ransom, Artie Jr. is released by police and returns to his family.

The Bottolotta Family blames Carlito, Rocco, and Earl for assisting Reggie in the kidnapping. Artie Sr. puts out a contract on the trio. The hitman contracted to kill them, Nacho Reyes (Luis Guzmán), and Carlito's accomplice, Colorado help them find the hoodlums with Reggie. Reggie's location is learned.

Carlito and Nacho find Reggie in an apartment, along with Earl. The four men draw guns, Nacho holding two revolvers and Carlito holding a revolver and Reggie threatening Carlito, taking no responsibility for the trouble he has caused. Reggie is killed, and Nacho leaves. Carlito, Earl and Rocco continue working for the Bottolotta Family, dealing heroin.

Carlito and Earl pay off corrupt cops in Harlem to raid and kill the entire Bottolotta Family. Carlito, Rocco and Earl fly to the islands with Earl for his wedding. Earl retires, and Carlito reunites with Leticia, retiring temporarily.

== Casting ==
The character of Hollywood Nicky played by Sean Combs is based on real New York City drug lord Nicky Barnes.

In the film, the character Earl played by Mario Van Peebles makes a reference to Governor Rockefeller setting some new drug laws into effect. This is in reference to the Rockefeller drug laws which are tough mandatory sentencing laws for drug dealers.

Three actors appear in both Carlito's Way films: Luis Guzmán plays Pachanga in Carlito's Way and Nacho in Carlito's Way: Rise to Power, Jaime Sánchez plays Rudy in Carlito's Way and Eddie in Carlito's Way: Rise to Power, Jaime Tirelli plays Valentin in Carlito's Way and Mr. Cruz (Leticia's Father) in Carlito's Way: Rise to Power.

== Cast ==
- Jay Hernandez as Carlito "Charlie" Brigante
- Mario Van Peebles as Earl
- Michael Kelly as Rocco
- Sean Combs as Nicky "Hollywood Nicky"
- Luis Guzmán as "Nacho" Reyes
- Jaclyn DeSantis as Leticia Cruz
- Mtume Gant as Reggie
- Burt Young as Artie Bottolota Sr.
- Domenick Lombardozzi as Artie Bottolota Jr.
- Juan Carlos Hernández as Sigfredo Cruz
- Giancarlo Esposito as Detective Jeff "Little Jeff"
- Chad L. Coleman as Clyde Bassie
- Jaime Sánchez as Eddie

== Reception ==
On Rotten Tomatoes it has a score of 33% based on reviews from 6 critics.
