= Joseph Siravo =

American actor (1955–2021)

- Born: March 11, 1955; Washington, D.C., U.S.
- Died: April 11, 2021 (aged 66)
- Education: Stanford University (BA); New York University (MFA)
- Occupation: Actor
- Years active: 1991–2020
- Children: 1

Joseph Siravo (March 11, 1955 – April 11, 2021) was an American actor. He acted on Broadway in the Tony Award-winning productions of Oslo and The Light in the Piazza. His roles in film and television included Johnny Soprano in The Sopranos and Fred Goldman in The People v. O. J. Simpson: American Crime Story.

== Early life ==
Siravo was born on March 11, 1955, in Washington, D.C., where he was also raised. He was a graduate of both Stanford University and the Tisch School of the Arts.

== Career ==
Siravo's screen debut was in the 1993 film Carlito's Way. His character, Vincent "Vinnie" Taglialucci, seeks revenge for the death of his father and brother at the hands of a corrupt lawyer (Sean Penn) while accusing Carlito Brigante (Al Pacino) of assisting in the murder. Siravo appeared briefly in the Law & Order episode entitled "Burned" (S8; Ep9) in 1997. Siravo was cast in 1999 to play the role of Johnny Soprano, father of Tony Soprano, on The Sopranos. His character was included in five episodes during the series' run.

In the First National Tour of Jersey Boys, he played more than 2000 performances as Angelo DeCarlo.

He portrayed mobster John Gotti in the 2015 film The Wannabe as well as Gene Gotti in the 1998 made-for-TV film Witness to the Mob. He played the role of Niko in seasons one and two of the NBC show The Blacklist, and in 2015 played the role of Nicholas Bianco, the husband of Anna Bianco (Kathrine Narducci), in "Love Stories", the 13th episode of the fifth season of the CBS police procedural drama Blue Bloods. In the 2016 FX miniseries The People v. O.J. Simpson: American Crime Story, Siravo portrayed Fred Goldman, father of murder victim Ronald Goldman. In 2019, he played the role of Cardinal Mancini, a senior Vatican official in charge of the Pope's security on his visit to New York, in the 15th episode of the first season of the medical drama New Amsterdam.

Siravo appeared as John A. Rizzo, former Acting General Counsel of the CIA in the 2019 film, The Report, executive produced by Steven Soderbergh and directed by Scott Z. Burns.

== Death ==
Siravo died from cancer on April 11, 2021, at the age of 66. He had been diagnosed with stage four prostate cancer in 2017, which subsequently spread to his colon.

== Filmography ==
=== Film ===
- Carlito's Way (1993) - Vinnie Taglialucci
- The Search for One-eye Jimmy (1994) - Father Julio
- Animal Room (1995) - Dr. Rankin
- Walking and Talking (1996) - Amelia's Therapist
- Snow Day (1999) - Fredo Andolini
- 101 Ways (The Things a Girl Will Do to Keep Her Volvo) (2000) - Valentino
- Labor Pains (2000) - Mario
- A Day in Black and White (2001)
- Thirteen Conversations About One Thing (2001) - Bureau Chief
- WiseGirls (2002) - Gio Esposito
- Maid in Manhattan (2002) - Delgado
- Shark Tale (2004) - Great White #5 (voice)
- 16 Blocks (2006) - District Attorney Haynes (uncredited)
- The Wild (2006) - Carmine (voice)
- Rockaway (2007) - Blitzer
- Turn the River (2007) - Warren
- Enchanted (2007) - Bartender
- The Wannabe (2015) - John Gotti
- Equity (2016) - Frank
- The Report (2019) - John Rizzo
- Motherless Brooklyn (2019) - Union Boss Speaker (final film role)

=== Broadway ===
- Conversations with My Father
- The Boys from Syracuse
- The Light in the Piazza
- Oslo

=== Off-Broadway ===
- Oslo *OBIE Award for Best Ensemble, dir. Bartlett Sher
- Mad Forest *Drama Desk nomination for Best Ensemble, dir. Mark Wing-Davey
- My Night with Reg, dir. Jack Hofsiss
- Gemini, dir. Mark Brokaw
- Tennessee & Me, dir. Bob Balaban
- Dark Rapture, dir. Scott Ellis
- Major Crimes, dir. Arthur Penn
- New York Actor, dir. Jerry Zaks
- The Barber of Seville, dir. John Rando
