= Martin Bregman =

American film producer

- Born: Martin Leon Bregman; May 18, 1926; New York City, U.S.
- Died: June 16, 2018 (aged 92); New York City, U.S.
- Resting place: Kensico Cemetery
- Occupation: Film producer
- Spouses: Elizabeth Driscoll (divorced); Cornelia Sharpe (m. 1981)
- Children: 3

Martin Leon "Marty" Bregman (May 18, 1926 – June 16, 2018) was an American film producer and personal manager. He produced many films, including Serpico (1973), Dog Day Afternoon (1975), Venom, The Four Seasons (both 1981), Scarface (1983), Sea of Love (1989), Betsy's Wedding (1990), Carlito's Way (1993), The Bone Collector (1999), The Adventures of Pluto Nash (2002), and Carlito's Way: Rise to Power (2005).

== Early life ==
Bregman was born in New York City to Leon and Ida (Granowski) Bregman. He was Jewish and grew up in the Bronx. As a child, he suffered from polio. He began his career selling insurance and first got into the entertainment business as a night club agent.

== Career ==
Bregman ventured into film producing in 1973, building projects around Pacino, initially with the Sidney Lumet directed Serpico. The film's acclaim set the path for many more highly acclaimed collaborations with Pacino, including 1975's Dog Day Afternoon, 1983's Scarface, 1989's Sea of Love and 1993's Carlito's Way. In the 1970s Bregman nearly directed David Rabe's screenplay for First Blood with Pacino starring as John Rambo, but Pacino declined to appear because he found the story too dark. Beginning in 1979 with The Seduction of Joe Tynan, and for most of the 1980s, Bregman enjoyed a successful run of films with writer/director Alan Alda. Their creative and business partnership yielded such well received films as The Four Seasons in 1981, Sweet Liberty in 1986, A New Life in 1988 and Betsy's Wedding in 1990. Other films include 1999's The Bone Collector with Denzel Washington and 2002's The Adventures of Pluto Nash, starring Eddie Murphy, one of the producer's rare box-office failures. While in 1983, both Alda and Bregman signed deals with Universal Pictures, he was moved off to movie production studio Lorimar Motion Pictures in 1986. The deal never lasted that long as he returned to Universal in the late 1980s. In 1992, Bregman partnered with Capella Films executive Willi Baer to form Bregman/Baer Productions at Universal Pictures, the deal would later be dissolved in 1997.

Bregman also produced two short-lived television shows, 1980's S*H*E and 1984's The Four Seasons, with Alda, based on the films.

== Personal life ==
Bregman lived in New York City and had two sons with former wife Elizabeth Driscoll, Christopher Bregman (Real Estate Entrepreneur), film producer Michael (Sea of Love, Carlito's Way), and a daughter, singer Marissa Bregman, with another wife, actress Cornelia Sharpe (Serpico, Open Season, The Reincarnation of Peter Proud, The Next Man, S*H*E, Venom). He died from a cerebral hemorrhage, aged 92, on June 16, 2018.

== Filmography ==
He was a producer in all films unless otherwise noted.

=== Film ===
Year	Film	Credit	Notes	Other notes
1973	Serpico			
1975	Dog Day Afternoon			
1976	The Next Man			
1979	The Seduction of Joe Tynan			
1980	S*H*E			
1980	Simon			
1981	The Four Seasons			
1981	Venom			
1983	Eddie Macon's Run			
1983	Scarface			
1986	Sweet Liberty			
1987	Real Men			
1988	A New Life			
1989	Sea of Love			
1990	Betsy's Wedding			
1992	Whispers in the Dark			
1992	Blue Ice			
1993	The Real McCoy			
1993	Carlito's Way			
1994	The Shadow			
1995	Gold Diggers: The Secret of Bear Mountain			
1996	Matilda	Executive producer		
1997	Nothing to Lose			
1998	One Tough Cop			
1999	The Bone Collector			
2002	The Adventures of Pluto Nash			
2003	Carolina			
2005	Carlito's Way: Rise to Power		Direct-to-video	Final film as a producer

As an actor

Year	Film	Role	Notes
1976	The Next Man	None	Uncredited

=== Television ===
Year	Title	Credit
1984	The Four Seasons	Executive producer
