= Jay Hernandez =

American and Mexican actor (born 1978)

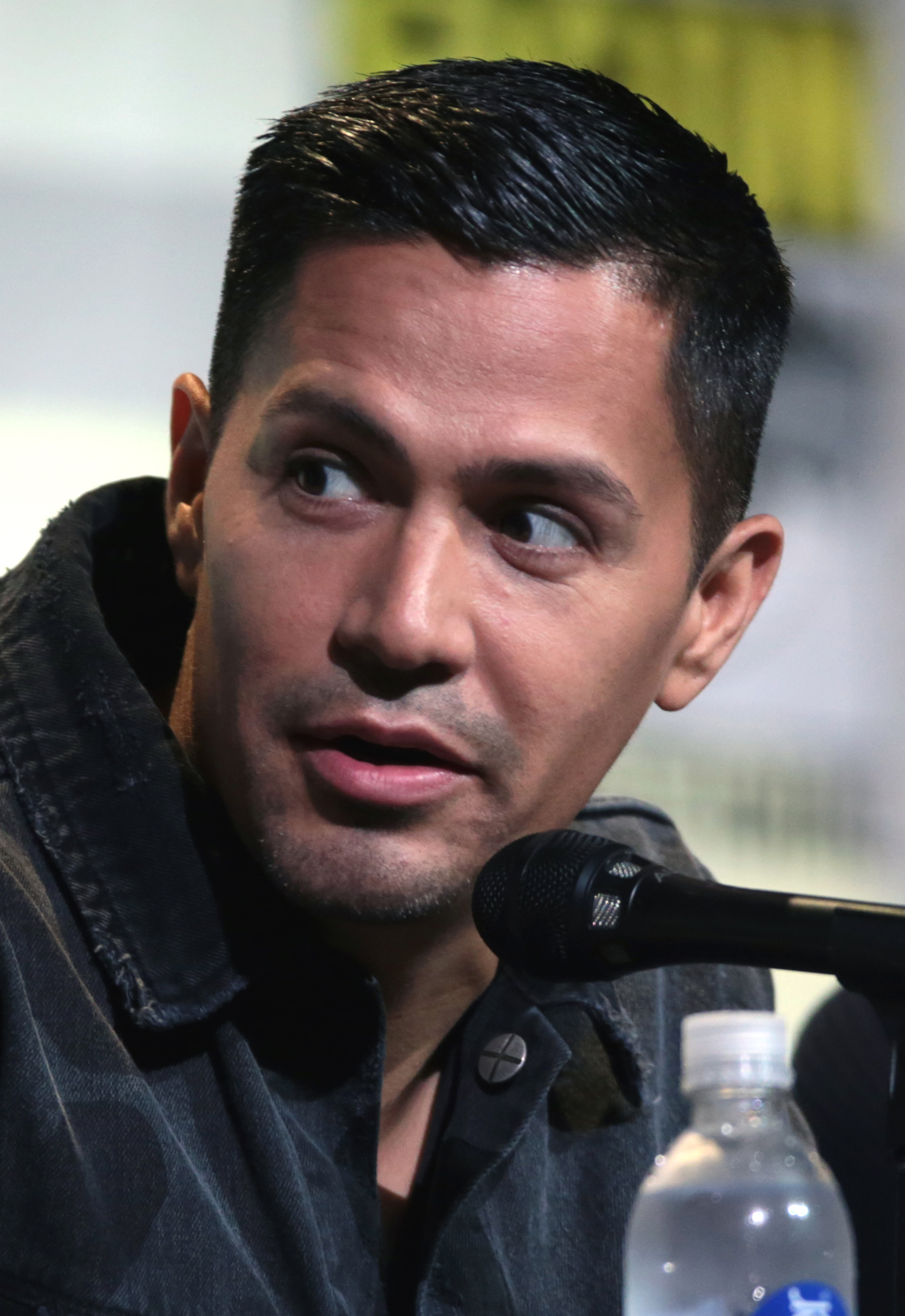
- Hernandez at the 2016 San Diego Comic-Con
- Born: Javier Manuel Hernandez; February 20, 1978 (age 48); Montebello, California, U.S.
- Citizenship: United States; Mexico
- Occupation: Actor
- Years active: 1998–present
- Spouse: Daniella Deutscher (m. 2006)

Javier Manuel "Jay" Hernandez (born February 20, 1978) is an American and Mexican actor. After making his television debut in NBC's Hang Time, he made his film debut opposite Kirsten Dunst in the romantic drama Crazy/Beautiful (2001). He has since starred in numerous films, including Torque (2004), Friday Night Lights (2004), Hostel (2005), Bad Moms (2016), and as Chato Santana / El Diablo in Suicide Squad (2016). From 2018 to 2024, he played Thomas Magnum in the CBS television series Magnum P.I.

== Early life ==
Hernandez was born on February 20, 1978, in Montebello, California to Mexican parents, his mother Isis (née Maldonado), a secretary and accountant, and his father Javier Hernandez Sr., a mechanic. He has a younger sister, Amelia, and two older brothers, Michael and Gabriel. He attended Don Bosco Technical Institute in Rosemead, California, but transferred to Schurr High School in Montebello for his senior year. While riding an elevator in a high-rise in Los Angeles, he was approached by talent manager Howard Tyner who suggested he had what it took to have a successful career in Hollywood. He enrolled Hernandez into acting school and sent his pictures to casting agents. He is first generation Mexican-American; his parents are immigrants from Michoacán, Mexico who both came to the US in 1970.

== Career ==
From 1998 to 2000, Hernandez played Antonio Lopez on the NBC series Hang Time. His name break came with his role opposite Kirsten Dunst in the 2001 Touchstone Pictures feature Crazy/Beautiful. He has since appeared in several major Hollywood films, including lead roles in Carlito's Way: Rise to Power, the 2005 horror film Hostel and World Trade Center. He appeared in the action/crime film Takers (2010).

He appeared in the 2005 crime prequel Carlito's Way: Rise to Power as Carlito Brigante, the role originated by Al Pacino in the 1993 film of the same name.

Hernandez portrayed Paxton in Eli Roth's Hostel (2005) and its 2007 sequel, Hostel: Part II.

In 2015, he appeared in Max as a US military sergeant assigned with the titular rescue dog, which was traumatized by his previous handler's death.

In 2016, he starred as Jessie Harkness in the comedy film Bad Moms, and as metahuman ex-gangster El Diablo in the superhero film Suicide Squad.

On February 20, 2018, Hernandez was cast as Thomas Magnum in CBS drama series Magnum P.I. reboot. It premiered on September 24, 2018. After four seasons, it was canceled in May 2022, before being rescued by NBC with a two-season order that June.

In 2024 it was announced that Hernandez was to direct his first film, Night Comes, an apocalyptic horror film starring Dafne Keen, Samantha Lorraine and Alexander Ludwig. Principal photography took place in Vancouver, Canada in 2024.

== Personal life ==
In 2006, Hernandez married his former Hang Time co-star Daniella Deutscher.

== Filmography ==
=== Film ===
Year	Film	Role	Notes
2000	Living the Life	Kikicho	
2001	Crazy/Beautiful	Carlos Nuñez	
2001	Joy Ride	Marine	Cameo
2002	The Rookie	Joaquin "Wack" Campos	
2004	Torque	Dalton	
2004	Ladder 49	Keith Perez	
2004	Friday Night Lights	Brian Chavez	
2005	Hostel	Paxton Rodriguez	
2005	Carlito's Way: Rise to Power	Carlito Brigante	
2006	Nomad	Erali	
2006	Karas: The Prophecy	Nue	Voice role
2006	World Trade Center	Dominick Pezzulo	
2007	Grindhouse	Bobby	Teaser trailer segment: "Thanksgiving"
2007	Live!	Pablo	
2007	Hostel: Part II	Paxton Rodriguez	
2008	American Son	Junior	
2008	Lakeview Terrace	Detective Javier Villareal	
2008	Quarantine	Jake	
2008	Nothing like the Holidays	Ozzy	
2010	Takers	Eddie "Hatch" Hatcher	
2012	LOL	James	
2013	Trooper	Carlos Coto	
2015	Max	Sgt. Reyes	
2015	The Night Is Young	Dean	
2016	Bad Moms	Jessie Harkness	
2016	Suicide Squad	Chato Santana / El Diablo	
2017	A Bad Moms Christmas	Jessie Harkness	
2017	Bright	Rodriguez	
2019	Toy Story 4	Bonnie's Dad	Voice role
2023	The Long Game	JB Peña	
2025	Aztec Batman: Clash of Empires	Yohualli Coatl / Batman	Voice role; Direct-to-Video
2026	Toy Story 5	Bonnie's Dad	Voice role
2027	The Revenge of La Llorona †	TBA	Post-production
TBA	Night Comes †	—N/a	Directorial debut

=== Television ===
Year	Title	Role	Notes
1998–2000	Hang Time	Antonio Lopez	Guest star (Season 4) Main cast member (Seasons 5–6)
1999	USA High	Jose	1 episode
2000	Undressed	Eddie	Unknown episodes
2000	One World	Octavio	1 episode
2002	American Family	Cisco	2 episodes
2006–2007	Six Degrees	Carlos Green	14 episodes
2012	Last Resort	Paul Wells	7 episodes
2013	Nashville	Dante Rivas	6 episodes
2013	Ghost Ghirls	Agent Sanchez	1 episode
2014	Gang Related	Daniel Acosta	13 episodes
2015–2016	The Expanse	Dimitri Havelock	5 episodes
2017	Scandal	Curtis Pryce	Recurring role, Season 7
2018–2024	Magnum P.I.	Thomas Magnum	Main role, 96 episodes; producer (2021–2024)
2019	BoJack Horseman	Himself/Mario	Voice role; Episode: "A Horse Walks into a Rehab"
2020	Hawaii Five-0	Thomas Magnum	Episode: "Ihea 'oe i ka wa a ka ua e loku ana?"

== Awards and nominations ==
Year	Association	Category	Result	Work
2002	ALMA Awards	Outstanding Actor in a Motion Picture	Nominated	Crazy/Beautiful
2006	Fangoria Chainsaw Awards	Dude You Don't Wanna Mess With (Best Hero)	Nominated	Hostel
2006	Teen Choice Awards	Movie – Choice Scream	Nominated	Hostel
2020	National Hispanic Media Coalition Impact Awards	Outstanding Performance in a Television Series	Won	Magnum P.I.
