= Ted Beniades =

American character actor

- Cropped Photo of Ted Beniades
- Born: Theodore Cleanthis Beniades; November 17, 1922; New York City, U.S.
- Died: October 24, 2014 (aged 91); Brookville, Pennsylvania, U.S.
- Occupation: Character actor
- Spouse: Marion Lauer (died. 2009)

Theodore Cleanthis Beniades (November 17, 1922 – October 24, 2014) was an American character actor of screen and stage who was best known for appearing in Brian De Palma's Scarface (1983) as the undercover police officer Seidelbaum.

Beniades was born on November 17, 1922, in New York City, the son of Greek immigrants Mary and Cleanthis Beniades. He joined the United States Army on March 1, 1943, as an enlisted soldier and was discharged in September 1944. After his military service, he began studying acting at the Dramatic Workshop in New York. He appeared in such films as The Odd Couple (1968), Serpico (1973) and The Next Man (1976) and such television series as Dark Shadows, N.Y.P.D., The Jackie Gleason Show, Kojak, The Andros Targets, and The Equalizer.

Beniades died on October 24, 2014, at the age of 91.

== Filmography ==
Ted Beniades film and television credits
Year	Title	Role	Notes
1966	A Man Called Adam	Minor Role	
1967	Reflections in a Golden Eye	Sergeant	Uncredited
1968	The Odd Couple	The Bartender	Uncredited
1968	The Detective	Reporter	Uncredited
1971	The Pursuit of Happiness	Traffic Cop	
1971	They Might Be Giants	Taxi Driver	
1971	The Gang That Couldn't Shoot Straight	Man In Black Suit	
1973	Serpico	Sarno	
1976	The Next Man	Frank DeDario	
1983	Scarface	Officer Seidelbaum	
1987	The Equalizer	Police Officer	Episode: "Blood & Wine"
