= Edwin Torres (judge) =

New York State Supreme Court justice and novelist

- Born: January 7, 1931 (age 95); Manhattan, New York, U.S.
- Occupations: attorney, New York State Supreme Court justice, writer

Edwin Torres (born January 7, 1931) is a former New York State Supreme Court justice and novelist of Puerto Rican descent. Torres wrote Carlito's Way and its sequel After Hours, which was adapted into the 1993 film Carlito's Way, starring Al Pacino.

== Early years ==
Both of Torres's parents emigrated from Jayuya, Puerto Rico, and settled in the barrio in Manhattan's Spanish Harlem, where Torres was born. Growing up in poverty, Torres graduated from Stuyvesant High School. From there he attended City College of the City University of New York, followed by Brooklyn Law School.

== Legal career ==
In 1958, Torres was admitted to the New York State Bar. In 1959, as an assistant district attorney, he participated in the prosecution of Sal "the Capeman" Agron. Shortly thereafter, Torres became a criminal defense lawyer.

In 1977, Torres was appointed to the New York State Criminal Court. Three years later, he was elected to the New York State Supreme Court, where he served as a justice representing the Twelfth Judicial District in New York City. The Criminal Branch of the New York State Supreme Court tries felony cases in the five counties of New York City, and Torres presided over a number of high profile murder cases during his tenure.

The New York Times called Torres “one of the city’s most experienced and sternest judges and a man known for a crackling eloquence both in and out of the courtroom.” A famous exchange involved Torres telling a convicted murderer, "Sucker, your parole officer ain't been born yet."

In the Law & Order: Criminal Intent season 1 episode "Semi-Professional", the character Judge Raoul Sabatelli is said to have been inspired by Justice Torres.

Torres retired from the bench in 2008 and since then has served on the New York State Athletic Commission.

== Writer of crime fiction ==
Torres' tough upbringing in Manhattan and his work in the criminal justice system enabled him to create realistic crime fiction characters and plots. Richie Narvaez called him "the Granddaddy—¡El Abuelo!—of Latino crime fiction in the U.S. For a brief while in the 1970s, Torres picked up the mantle of Chester Himes and Miguel Piñero, keeping the door cracked open for crime fiction writers who happen to be ethnically diverse. Without Torres we might not have gotten Ernesto Quiñonez' Bodega Dreams, Carolina Garcia-Aguilera's Lupe Solano series, or even Walter Mosley's Devil in a Blue Dress."

Torres wrote Carlito's Way in 1975 and its sequel After Hours in 1979. Both novels follow the exploits of Carlito Brigante, a fictional Puerto Rican drug kingpin and hustler who ends up doing time in Sing-Sing and struggles to "go straight" after his release. The New Yorker praised Carlito's Way: "It is in the grisly tradition of Little Caesar, The Jones Men, and The Friends of Eddie Coyle, and it is the equal of any of them."

Another novel, Q & A (1977), portrays the investigation of a decorated New York City police lieutenant suspected of corruption. Of the book, The New York Times noted, "Judge Torres infuses these nearly current events with so much life and style that you can almost smell the musty air of 100 Centre Street."

=== Film adaptations ===
A film adaptation of Q & A was released in 1990, directed by Sidney Lumet and starring Nick Nolte and Armand Assante. After Hours was filmed in 1993, but used the title Carlito's Way to avoid being confused with Martin Scorsese's 1985 film After Hours. The film stars Al Pacino and Sean Penn, under the direction of Brian De Palma. The novel Carlito's Way was filmed in 2005 and released under the title Carlito's Way: Rise to Power.

== See also ==
- List of Hispanic and Latino American jurists
- List of Puerto Rican writers
- List of Puerto Ricans
- Puerto Rican literature
