= Venom (1981 film) =

- Theatrical release poster
- Directed by: Piers Haggard
- Screenplay by: Robert Carrington
- Based on: Venom by Alan Scholefield
- Produced by: Martin Bregman
- Starring: Sterling Hayden; Klaus Kinski; Sarah Miles; Nicol Williamson; Cornelia Sharpe; Susan George; Lance Holcomb; Oliver Reed
- Cinematography: Denys Coop; Gilbert Taylor
- Edited by: Michael Bradsell
- Music by: Michael Kamen
- Production companies: Morison Film Group; Venom Productions
- Distributed by: Paramount Pictures (United States and Canada); HandMade Films (international); 20th Century Fox (germany)
- Release dates: 28 November 1981 (Japan); 19 January 1982 (United Kingdom)
- Running time: 92 minutes
- Country: United Kingdom
- Language: English
- Budget: US$5.5 million UK£7.5 million
- Box office: $5.2 million

Venom is a 1981 British natural horror-thriller film directed by Piers Haggard and written by Robert Carrington. It stars Sterling Hayden, Klaus Kinski, Sarah Miles, Nicol Williamson, Cornelia Sharpe, Susan George, Lance Holcomb, and Oliver Reed. The film is based on Alan Scholefield's novel of the same name.

== Plot ==
International criminal Jacques Müller and his girlfriend Louise Andrews plan to kidnap Philip Hopkins, the grandson of Howard Anderson, a retired hunter and the wealthy owner of a hotel chain. Louise goes undercover as a maid working for Philip's mother Ruth and seduces her chauffeur Dave Averconnelly, convincing him to help in the kidnapping. On the day of the kidnapping, Müller tricks Howard and Ruth into leaving home while Louise and Dave kidnap the boy. Philip leaves briefly to retrieve a pet snake, which is accidentally swapped with a black mamba meant for toxicologist Dr. Marion Stowe. Howard returns home early, and the black mamba is released and bites Louise in the face repeatedly before fleeing into the ventilation system.

Müller and Dave take Howard and Philip hostage, while Louise dies from the black mamba's venom. Stowe contacts the police, having discovered the mix-up, and a police officer is dispatched to the Hopkins residence. The officer is shot and killed by Dave with one of Howard's rifles, but the officer manages to call for backup before he dies. More police officers arrive, led by Commander William Bulloch, and after learning about the hostages, Bulloch has the street sealed off and tries to negotiate with Müller, but refuses to give in to Müller's demands for transportation and one million in different currencies. Stowe arrives with a case of anti-venom and informs Bulloch of the black mamba. Bulloch and Stowe warn both the kidnappers and hostages of the snake, and Müller lies that Louise is still alive, and orders Stowe to come to the front door with the anti-venom to treat her. Stowe complies and is taken hostage.

Bulloch discovers a secret entrance through the cellar, and he and two other officers try to enter. Stowe suggests turning off the central heating source, as this would send the black mamba into a coma. Dave and Howard climb into the cellar at the same time Bulloch and the officers enter. Bulloch shoots and injures Dave, and the black mamba attacks, forcing Bulloch and the officers to flee while Howard flees from the cellar and back onto the first floor. Dave is unable to escape and is killed by the black mamba.

Müller gives Bulloch a severed finger, which he falsely claims belongs to Stowe. Unable to enter the cellar with the black mamba inside, Bulloch gives in to Müller's demands and brings him his getaway car, which was previously confiscated. Bulloch demands to see the hostages, and Müller forces Stowe onto a balcony, forcing her to tell Bulloch that Howard and Philip are fine. Philip and Howard notice the black mamba and allow it to attack Müller, who stumbles onto the balcony while grappling with the snake. Howard pulls Stowe out of the line of fire, and police snipers proceed to shoot Müller and the snake multiple times, and Müller and the black mamba tumble off the balcony. The hostages are rescued and Ruth embraces Philip. The final shot of the film reveals that the black mamba had laid an egg in the vents, which hatches and slithers off.

== Cast ==
- Klaus Kinski as Jacques Müller
- Oliver Reed as Dave Averconnelly
- Nicol Williamson as Commander William Bulloch
- Sarah Miles as Dr. Marion Stowe
- Sterling Hayden as Howard Anderson
- Cornelia Sharpe as Ruth Hopkins
- Lance Holcomb as Philip Hopkins
- Susan George as Louise Andrews
- Mike Gwilym as Detective Constable Dan Spencer
- Paul Williamson as Detective Sergeant Glazer
- Michael Gough as David Ball
- Hugh Lloyd as Taxi Driver
- Rita Webb as Mrs. Loewenthal
- Edward Hardwicke as Lord Dunning
- John Forbes-Robertson as Sergeant Nash
- Maurice Colbourne as Sampson

== Production ==
Tobe Hooper was originally attached to direct but quit because of "creative differences", and Piers Haggard replaced him.

Kinski chose to do this film instead of Raiders of the Lost Ark because the salary was higher. In his autobiography, Kinski Uncut (1996), he also stated that the script for the Spielberg movie was "moronically shitty".

Haggard later recalled:

I took over that at very short notice. Tobe Hooper had been directing it and they had stopped for whatever reason. It hadn't been working. I did see some of his stuff and it didn't look particularly good plus he also had some sort of nervous breakdown or something. So anyway they stopped shooting and offered it to me. Unfortunately I had commitments, I had some commercials to shoot. But anyway I took it over with barely ten days of preparation—which shows. It doesn't become my picture, it's a bit in-between... [Oliver Reed was] scary at first because he was always testing you all the time. Difficult but not as difficult as Klaus Kinski. Because Oliver actually had a sense of humour. I was rather fond of him; he could be tricky but he was quite warm really. He just played games and was rather macho and so on. Klaus Kinski was very cold. The main problem with the film was that the two didn't get on and they fought like cats. Kinski of course is a fabulous film actor and he's good in the part, the part suits him very well. They were both well cast but it was a very unhappy film. I think Klaus was the problem but then Oliver spent half the movie just trying to rub him up, pulling his leg all the way. There were shouting matches because Oliver just wouldn't let up. None of this is about art. All the things that you're trying to concentrate on tend to slip. So it was not a happy period.

Filming took place in October 1980. In December 1981 it was announced Martin Bregman sold the film to Paramount. It was released in the UK by HandMade Films. Ray Cooper of HandMade later said "We bought it on the strength of its cast and couldn't believe how awful it was. We are making mistakes with HandMade but we have the humility to learn from them."

== Release ==
The film was released theatrically in the United States by Paramount Pictures on 29 January 1982. It grossed $5,229,643 at the box office.

The film was released on special edition DVD by Blue Underground on 29 July 2003. It features audio commentary by Haggard.

== Critical reception ==
On Rotten Tomatoes the film has an approval rating of 33% based on 9 reviews with an average rating of 5.3/10. Vincent Canby of The New York Times wrote, "If Venom doesn't turn out to be the silliest film of 1982, it's a good bet that it will land within a hoot and a holler of that distinction."

== See also ==
- List of killer snake films
