= Q & A (film) =

1990 film by Sidney Lumet

- Theatrical release poster
- Directed by: Sidney Lumet
- Written by: Sidney Lumet
- Based on: Q & A by Edwin Torres
- Produced by: Burtt Harris; Arnon Milchan
- Starring: Nick Nolte; Timothy Hutton; Armand Assante
- Cinematography: Andrzej Bartkowiak
- Edited by: Richard P. Cirincione
- Music by: Rubén Blades
- Production companies: Odyssey Distributors; Regency International Pictures
- Distributed by: Tri-Star Pictures
- Release date: April 27, 1990 (United States)
- Running time: 132 minutes
- Country: United States
- Language: English
- Budget: $6 million
- Box office: $11.2 million

Q & A is a 1990 American crime drama film written and directed by Sidney Lumet, based on a novel by New York State Supreme Court judge Edwin Torres. It stars Nick Nolte, Timothy Hutton, Armand Assante and Lumet's daughter, Jenny Lumet.

== Plot ==
Mike Brennan, a tough, crude, decorated New York City Police Department detective lieutenant, has a dark side and a partnership with certain organized crime figures. Brennan executes a small-time Puerto Rican criminal and then threatens witnesses to testify that he acted in self-defense. The head of the District Attorney's Homicide Bureau, Kevin Quinn, assigns the case to Deputy District Attorney Aloysius "Al" Francis Reilly, a young lawyer and past police officer and the son of an NYCPD cop killed in the line of duty. Reilly collects a deposition from Brennan, who claims to have been acting on an informant's tip and to have fired in self-defense. Reilly's information leads him to "Bobby Tex", a Puerto Rican crime boss called Texador, whose wife Nancy Bosch is an ex of Reilly's. She ended their relationship years ago after interpreting Al's surprise when she introduced him to her black father as racism. Al tries to rekindle their romance, but she rejects him because with Bobby she feels loved, protected and accepted for who and what she is.

Al, along with detectives Sam "Chappie" Chapman and Luis Valentin, has doubts about the shooting, knowing the environment of the Puerto Rican underworld. Investigations reveal a link between Quinn and Brennan. Brennan seeks out Roger "the Dodger" Montalvo, the only witness who can disprove his testimony. Brennan tries bribing and threatening Valentin and Chappie for help in finding and silencing Montalvo. Meanwhile, Bobby Tex is "invited" by the Mafia to step aside as a drug dealer, as Brennan's support remains useful to them. Bobby, in turn, begins looking for Montalvo as leverage against Brennan. He also begins shutting down his business to retire with Nancy in Puerto Rico.

Bobby finds Montalvo before Brennan does and they leave for Puerto Rico, where Bobby owns a mansion and a yacht. Bobby summons Al to Puerto Rico. Meanwhile, Brennan finds Montalvo's lover, the transgender José Malpica, and kills Malpica after listening to a message from Montalvo on his answering machine that reveals his location on a boat in Puerto Rico. Al, after informing Chief Deputy District Attorney Bloomenfeld, flies to the island, pursued by Brennan. There Bobby tells Al that Quinn (nicknamed "Skinny") was once part of Bobby's street gang and shot a rival gang member. Brennan is hunting down the gang's former members on Quinn's orders; Quinn wants to erase his past so he can fulfill his ambition to run for New York State Attorney General. Brennan has no choice because Quinn holds an abuse of authority charge over him from his early years on the force.

Brennan finds Montalvo and strangles him. He then slices the boat's fuel line and waits for Bobby to arrive. A phone call made by Al saves Nancy, but Bobby is killed in the explosion. Al procures an arrest warrant for Brennan but fails to catch him at the airport. He returns to the District Attorney's office to find Brennan waiting. Brennan reveals the truth about Al's father: that he was a bagman who was part of a "line" to protect regular people from criminals. Brennan shoots Chappie when he tries to intervene; Brennan in turn is then shot dead by another officer during the resulting gunfight.

Al is summoned by Quinn, who informs him that he is aware of his activities, but the Department is going to hush up the incident to avoid embarrassment given the upcoming mayoral election. When Al threatens to go to the papers, Bloomenfeld tells him that he has ways of preventing that and reminds Al that sources in the mayor's office could leak evidence of misconduct on the part of his late father, which would deny his mother her widow's service pension. Feeling betrayed and disillusioned, Al trashes his office and resigns. He searches for Nancy in Puerto Rico, hoping she will return to him, but when he finds her, she meets his marriage proposal with silence as she is mourning Bobby's death.

== Cast ==
- Nick Nolte as Lieutenant Mike Brennan
- Timothy Hutton as Deputy District Attorney Aloysius Francis "Al" Reilly
- Armand Assante as Roberto "Bobby Tex" Texador
- Paul Calderon as Roger Montalvo
- Charles Dutton as Detective Sam "Chappie" Chapman
- Luis Guzman as Detective Luis Valentin
- Jenny Lumet as Nancy Bosch
- Patrick O'Neal as Kevin Quinn
- Lee Richardson as Leo Bloomenfeld
- Fyvush Finkel as Preston Pearlstein
- John Capodice as Hank Mastroangelo
- Dominic Chianese as Pesch
- International Chrysis as Josè Malpica
- Vincent Pastore as Man sitting at bar

== Production ==
To prepare for his role in the film, Timothy Hutton went on squad-car runs with New York City Police officers in order to get an idea of the challenges they faced on the streets. Hutton said, "In many cases the hands of the officer on the street are tied". Nick Nolte put on 40 pounds (18 kg) for the film because he felt that the character he played required it: "Just the sheer mass of brutality. I felt that would be the right kind of thing. He had to be on the edge of his own dissipation".

== Reception ==
Q & A received positive reviews from critics, as the film holds an 88% rating on Rotten Tomatoes based on 24 reviews.

Roger Ebert gave the film three-and-a-half stars out of four and wrote, "It is fascinating the way this movie works so well as a police thriller on one level, while on other levels it probes feelings we may keep secret even from ourselves". In his review for The New York Times, Vincent Canby wrote, "Great little scenes overshadow bigger, more important ones. Characters come and go at speed. Watching the movie is an entertaining ride, but when it is over it is difficult to remember where, exactly, one has been".

Rolling Stone magazine's Peter Travers wrote, "Lumet tries to cram too much in ... But he's onto something, and you can sense his excitement. This is Lumet's boldest film in years -- a combustible drama with a vivid, shocking immediacy. The director is back at the top of his game".

In his review for The Washington Post, Hal Hinson praised Nick Nolte's performance: "This actor doesn't flinch in the least from his character's unsavoriness; instead he seems to glory in his crumpled suits and unwashed hair, as if they were a kind of spiritual corollary. Nolte gives Brennan a kind of monumental brutishness -- he makes him seem utterly indomitable".

USA Today gave the film two-and-a-half stars out of four and wrote, "Overkill ultimately wears Q & A down, despite two bravura performances and some Hutton understatement that's adequate to the task. So, too, does unrelenting sordidness, a deadly love angle and a score (Ruben Blades) almost as awful as Cy Coleman's sabotage of Lumet's Family Business".

In his review for The Globe and Mail Rick Groen praised Armand Assante's performance: "in a role that could easily descend into cliche – the crook with a moral code – Assante does his best work to date, always keeping on the safe side of the stereotype". Newsweek magazine's David Ansen wrote, "Nolte, with a big paunch and a walrus mustache, is a truly dangerous presence here; he uses his threatening body and a high, strained voice to stunning, scary effect. Like the movie, Nolte really gets in your face and, for a long time afterwards, sticks in your craw".

Entertainment Weekly gave the film an "A−" rating and Owen Gleiberman wrote, "Q & A is a major film by one of our finest mainstream directors. As both a portrait of modern-day corruption and an act of sheer storytelling bravura, it is not to be missed".
