= The Next Man =

1976 film by Richard C. Sarafian

- Original poster
- Directed by: Richard C. Sarafian
- Screenplay by: Morton S. Fine; Alan Trustman; David M. Wolf; Richard C. Sarafian
- Story by: Alan Trustman; David M. Wolf
- Produced by: Martin Bregman
- Starring: Sean Connery; Cornelia Sharpe; Albert Paulsen; Adolfo Celi; Marco St. John; Ted Beniades; Charles Cioffi
- Cinematography: Michael Chapman
- Edited by: Aram Avakian; Robert Q. Lovett
- Music by: Michael Kamen
- Production company: Artists Entertainment Complex
- Distributed by: Allied Artists Pictures Corporation
- Release date: November 10, 1976
- Running time: 108 minutes
- Country: United States
- Language: English

The Next Man (also known as The Arab Conspiracy and Double Hit) is a 1976 American political action thriller film starring Sean Connery, Cornelia Sharpe, Albert Paulsen, and Charles Cioffi. Music for the film features New York City guitarist Frederic Hand. It was the film score debut for composer Michael Kamen.

== Plot ==
The film is set in November 1976, shortly after the Arab Oil Embargo of 1973–1974. A group of politicians within the Arab world support a radical agenda including a cap on international oil prices. Within 48 hours of this plan's becoming known to the Americans and Russians, the three top men in the group are assassinated — the Kuwaiti is defenestrated, the Saudi is shot, and the Tunisian (Adolfo Celi) is seduced, drugged, and asphyxiated. In the first two cases, the assassins themselves are killed shortly after leaving the scene — in one case by another assassin named Gregory Zolnikov (director Richard C. Sarafian in an uncredited role), and in the other by the victim's bodyguard Hamid (Albert Paulsen). In the third case, the seductress is Irish aristocrat and part-time assassin Nicole Scott (Cornelia Sharpe).

Due to his predecessor's assassination, Khalil Abdul-Muhsen (Sean Connery) becomes the new Saudi Arabian minister of state — the "next man." He delivers a speech to the United Nations in which he calls for a "new global socio-political order," including not only the oil price cap but the exploration of new energy sources, the international recognition of Israel, the creation of a Palestinian state, and Saudi Arabian aid to needy Third World nations. He ends by quoting Yasser Arafat's 1974 UN General Assembly speech: "I hold neither a symbol nor a gun. My hands are empty. They reach out to you. Which of you will take them?" His police bodyguard informs him that this speech has raised his risk of assassination from a "C-minus" to an "A."

Meanwhile, Nicole Scott has flown to New York and arranges to meet Abdul-Muhsen at a soirée. They flirt again at an auction, where Scott is outbid on a snuffbox but Abdul-Muhsen wins the bid at $5000 and delivers it to her as a gift. They meet for drinks and backgammon; then on the spur of the moment fly to the Bahamas to escape New York's winter weather. In the Bahamas, a team of commandos posing as Palestinian terrorists attempts to assassinate Abdul-Muhsen, but he survives with help from Hamid and from Scott, who has a chance to kill Abdul-Muhsen but chooses to shoot his attacker instead.

Abdul-Muhsen returns to the UN, where he delivers a second impassioned speech, this time announcing that Saudi Arabia will invite Israel to join OPEC. Scott receives a note from her handler with a single word: "Now!" Nevertheless, Scott doesn't act. Abdul-Muhsen confesses his love for her and urges her to return with him to Saudi Arabia. Meanwhile, the NYPD learns that Zolnikov has arrived in New York. As Abdul-Muhsen and his entourage depart the Saudi Arabian embassy en route to the airport, his enemies place four suitcase bombs among the protesters in the street outside. The bombs explode around Abdul-Muhsen's limousine, but due to the wisdom of his police escort, Abdul-Muhsen is in fact riding with Hamid and Scott in the unmarked car ahead of the limousine. Their car gets stuck in a traffic jam. Hamid turns around in the driver's seat, revealing a gun, and tells Scott, "Now. Kill him now." Hamid's gun moves toward Abdul-Muhsen. Scott shoots Hamid in the temple, then turns to Abdul-Muhsen and shoots him as well as she tells him "soft brown eyes," a phrase used to describe her.

The final scene shows Scott arriving with the snuffbox coming through customs in London, explaining that it was "a gift." As she leaves the airport, Zolnikov is seen following her.

== Cast ==
- Sean Connery as Khalil Abdul-Muhsen
- Cornelia Sharpe as Nicole Scott
- Albert Paulsen as Hamid
- Adolfo Celi as Al Sharif
- Marco St. John as Justin
- Ted Beniades as Frank DeDario
- Charles Cioffi as Fouad
- Jaime Sánchez as New York Security

== Production ==
Connery's casting was announced in January 1976.

Cornelia Sharpe later spoke fondly of her co-star Connery: "He’s fabulous. He’s just like you and me. He’s very warm and a terrific guy who’s got his act together and deals with success beautifully."

The film was shot at the Astoria Studios in New York City.

== Reception ==
The film on its release was not received particularly well by critics. Roger Ebert began his review: "When good directors work with bad material, Pauline Kael once said, [...] they shove art into the crevices of dreck. That would do as a description of The Next Man, a movie with an impenetrable plot that nevertheless has its moments." Ebert was impressed by Sharpe's performance, describing her as a "cool beauty."

Vincent Canby of The New York Times described the film as a "suspense melodrama made by people whose talent for filmmaking and knowledge of international affairs would both fit comfortably into the left nostril of a small bee." Like Ebert, he criticized the plot, remarking that "The Next Man is obsessed with political assassination but it never really identifies its villains, preferring, instead, to cop out by playing on natural paranoia that assumes that everyone everywhere is on the take from someone somewhere. This attitude is too easy to represent true cynicism." Canby also criticized locations in the film that added to the confusing nature of the plot, commenting "The Next Man moves rootlessly around the world like a fretful tourist, from New York City to the Middle East, the south of France, London, Ireland, Bavaria, and the Bahamas, though nothing much happens in any one of these places that couldn't as easily happen somewhere else."

Variety was not impressed, commenting, "The Next Man emerges more a slick travesty with political overtones than the cynical suspense meller it was designed to be ... No less than four writers compiled the screenplay and it shows."

Producer Martin Bregman received an official protest from the Saudi government after the film was released.

The film came third for the week at the U.S. box office, behind Two-Minute Warning and Car Wash.
