= Cover Girls (film) =

1977 film by Jerry London

- Genre: Crime; Drama; Mystery; Thriller
- Written by: Mark Rodgers
- Directed by: Jerry London
- Starring: Cornelia Sharpe; Jayne Kennedy; Don Galloway
- Music by: Richard Shores
- Country of origin: United States
- Original language: English

Production
- Executive producer: David Gerber
- Producers: Charles B. Fitzsimons; Mark Rodgers
- Cinematography: William B. Jurgensen
- Editors: Arthur Hilton (as Arthur Hilton); Stanley Wohlberg
- Running time: 73 minutes
- Production companies: David Gerber Productions; Columbia Pictures Television

Original release
- Network: NBC
- Release: May 18, 1977

Cover Girls is a 1977 American made-for-television crime drama film directed by Jerry London and starring Cornelia Sharpe, Jayne Kennedy and Don Galloway.

== Plot ==
Two world class models, Linda and Monique, work for an American intelligence agency. They are given a mission to track down an embezzler who is also being chased by a criminal, Michael. Linda falls for the embezzler.

== Cast ==
- Cornelia Sharpe as Linda Allen
- Jayne Kennedy as Monique Lawrence
- Don Galloway as James Andrews
- Michael Baseleon as Paul Richards
- DeVeren Bookwalter as Karl
- Jerry Douglas as Fritz Porter
- Sean Garrison as Sven
- Don Johnson as Johnny Wilson
- George Lazenby as Michael
- Bill Overton as Football Player
- Ellen Travolta as The Photographer
- Vince Edwards as Bradner
- Lenore Stevens as Maria
- Eric Holland as Bodyguard #1
- Paul Dumont as Georg
- Maurice Marsac as Mireau
- James Almanzar as Hans
- Todd Martin as Bodyguard #2
- Fritzi Burr as Seamstress #1
- June Whitley Taylor as Seamstress #2
- Peter Gunneau as French Detective
- Brian Baker as Uniform Sergeant
- Ben Frommer as Tourist In Bus
- Kieu Chinh as Chinese Model
- Carolyn Brandt as Girl Singer
- Bob Hastings as Joe

== Production ==
The success of Charlie's Angels in the 1976-77 ratings season prompted all the American TV networks to feature more sexy young women in action-orientated roles, either adding them to existing programs or introducing new shows that focused on them. NBC picked up The Bionic Woman from ABC and also added young female characters to the 1977–78 seasons of Baa Baa Black Sheep and BJ and the Bear. They introduced several new shows with female sex symbol leads such as Quark, The Roller Girls and Who's Watching the Kids?, as well as commissioning pilots for several series which were direct imitations of Charlie's Angels: The Secret War of Jackie's Girls, The Hunted Lady and Cover Girls.

== Reception ==
The Los Angeles Times said "the only things not negligible about" the movie was "are the radiant beauty of its stars, Grady Hunt's elegant costumes for them and a creditable acting job by Vince Edwards."

Writer Marcia Hilmes contrasted the film negatively with Charlie's Angels, arguing that in Angels the lead characters were always first and foremost detectives, with any sexual objectification as an aid to their detective work, whereas in Cover Girls the leads seemed to place as much emphasis on their modelling as their crime fighting. She also pointed out that Cover Girls included scenes implying an erotic relationship between the two leads, further objectifying them sexually.

== See also ==
- List of American films of 1977

== Notes ==
- Hilmes, Mary (2007). NBC: America's Network. University of California Press. ISBN 9780520250819.
