= José Antonio Sainz de Vicuña =

Spanish film company

José Antonio Sáinz de Vicuña created IMPALA in the 1960s, a company which has produced over one hundred films directed by several of Spain's top directors. At present it owns sixty five negatives, several of them considered classics.

He is a graduate of Yale University, where he was a senior editor of campus humor magazine The Yale Record.

He was President of Warner Española, a company which was in partnership with Warner Bros. and during thirty years distributed all WB products in Spain. Was also President of Warner Home Video in Spain during ten years.

As Vice President of Incine, he was also involved in the distribution of 20th Century Fox films between 1970 and 1988. At different times during those last decades also distributed Columbia Pictures, Disney and PolyGram while this company remained active.

He was on the Board of Cinesa, Spain's leading theatrical chain, as well as on the Board of Warner-Lusomundo Theaters.

He created CINEPAQ together with Canal+ France. In 1992 CINEPAQ merged with IDEA, a company belonging to the PRISA GROUP, and formed SOGEPAQ. He was President of SOGEPAQ, a company which financed most of Spain's top box office films during the last twenty years as well as creating the largest modern catalogue of Spanish feature films.

From 1997 to 2000 he was a member of the Board of the European Film Academy.

In 2000 he became President of PLURAL, a new PRISA audiovisual production company.

Together with Luis García Berlanga and Alfredo Matas, conceived and promoted.

Ciudad de la Luz Studios in Alicante, one of Europe's most modern Studios .35 films have been shot in CDLL since it began operating in 2005.

In 2006 decided to revive Impala's activities while remaining as a consultant to PLURAL. Besides films IMPALA is now involved in developing TV series and programs – at present it is developing a Mexican co production with TVE – and theatrical plays together with SABRE, a company with a long record of successes in the theater.

In 2007 he was awarded EGEDA's Gold Medal.

In 2010 he started the creation of a new branch of IMPALA, IMPALA Digital, producing content for the Internet including Social media.

As a producer, distributor and initiator of several audiovisual ventures, Jose Vicuña's main objective during his career has always been to promote Spanish creative talent both inside and outside Spain.

== Filmography ==
Year	Title	Director(s)
2008	8 citas	Peris Romano y Rodrigo Sorogoyen
2007	Goal II, viviendo el sueño	Jaume Collet Serra
2005	Los dos lados de la cama	Emilio Martínez Lázaro
2003	Dos tipos duros	Juan Martínez Moreno
2002	El otro lado de la cama	Emilio Martínez Lázaro
2001	Algunas chicas doblan las piernas cuando hablan	Ana Díez
2001	Hacerse el sueco	Daniel Díaz Torres
2000	Gitano	Manuel Palacios
1997	99.9	Agustí Villaronga
1993	Amor y deditos del pie	Luis Felipe Rocha
1992	El laberinto griego	Rafael Alcázar
1992	Sevilla connection	José Ramón Larraz
1991	Ni se te ocurra	Luis María Delgado
1991	Nunca estuve en Viena	Antonio Larreta
1991	El invierno en Lisboa	Jose A. Zorrilla
1990	Aquí huele a muerto	Álvaro Sáenz de Heredia
1990	Dancing Machine	Gilles Behat
1990	Álbum de familia	Luis Galvao
1987	Policía	Álvaro Saenz de Heredia
1985	Yo, el vaquilla	Jose Antonio de la Loma
1985	Flesh and blood	Paul Verhoeven
1985	La rapsodia de los cuatreros	Hugh Wilson
1984	Café, coca y puro	Antonio del Real
1984	Violines y trompetas	Rafael Romero Marchent
1984	Las fantasías de Cuny	Joaquín Luis Romero Marchent
1984	Camila	María Luisa Bemberg
1984	Las bicicletas son para el verano	Jaime Chávarri
1982	La Biblia en pasta	Manuel Summers
1982	Freddy el croupier	Álvaro Saenz de Heredia
1982	Cecilia	Humberto Solás
1982	El cabezota	Francisco Lara Polop
1982	Pares y nones	José Luis Cuerda
1981	Asesinato en el Comité Central	Vicente Aranda
1981	El crack	José Luis Garci
1980	La mano negra	Fernando Colomo
1980	El divorcio que viene	Pedro Masó
1980	Ángeles gordos	Manuel Summers
1980	Sentados al borde de la mañana con los pies colgando	Antonio J. Betacor
1980	127 millones libres de impuestos	Pedro Masó
1979	La miel	Pedro Masó
1979	La familia bien, gracias	José Luis López Vázquez
1978	Hierba salvaje	Luis Mª Delgado
1978	Los restos del naufragio	Ricardo Franco
1977	Tengamos la guerra en paz	Eugenio Martín
1977	La escopeta nacional	Luis García Berlanga
1977	Pepito piscinas	Luis Mª Delgado
1977	Nunca es tarde	Jaime de Armiñán
1977	Niñas… al salón	Vicente Escrivá
1977	Ensalada Baudelaire	Leopoldo Tusquets
1977	Los días del pasado	Mario Camus
1977	La coquito	Pedro Masó
1977	Cacique Bandeira	Héctor Olivera
1976	Cambio de sexo	Vicente Aranda
1976	La espada negra	Francisco Rovira Beleta
1976	Señoritas de uniforme	Luis Mª Delgado
1976	La menor	Pedro Masó
1976	La lozana andaluza	Vicente Escrivá
1976	El bengador justiciero y su pastelera madre	Forges
1976	Call girl (vida privada de la Srta. Julia)	Eugenio Martín
1975	Jo, papá	Jaime de Armiñán
1975	Las adolescentes	Pedro Masó
1975	Zorrita Martínez	José Luis López Vázquez
1975	La joven casada	Mario Camus
1975	País, S.A.	Forges
1975	Clara es el precio	Vicente Aranda
1974	Yo la vi primero	Fernando Fernán Gómez
1974	Un hombre como los demás	Pedro Masó
1974	El comisario G	Fernando Merino
1974	Open season (los cazadores)	Peter Collinson
1973	Pisito de solteras	Fernando Merino
1973	El amor del capitán Brando	Jaime de Armiñán
1973	Mi profesora particular	Jaime Camino
1973	Un trabajo tranquilo	Pasquale Festa Campanile
1973	Los pájaros de Baden Baden	Mario Camus
1972	Experiencia Prematrimonial	Pedro Masó
1969	La Lola dicen que no vive sola	Jaime de Armiñán
1969	Urtain, el rey de la selva o así	Manuel Summers
1968	¿Por qué te engaña tu marido?	Manuel Summers
1967	Una señora estupenda	Eugenio Martín
1966	Con el viento solano	Mario Camus
1965	Joaquín Murrieta	George Sherman
1964	El extraño viaje	Fernando Fernán Gómez
1964	La niña de luto	Manuel Summers
1963	Del rosa al amarillo	Manuel Summers
