= Cornelia Sharpe =

American actress and model

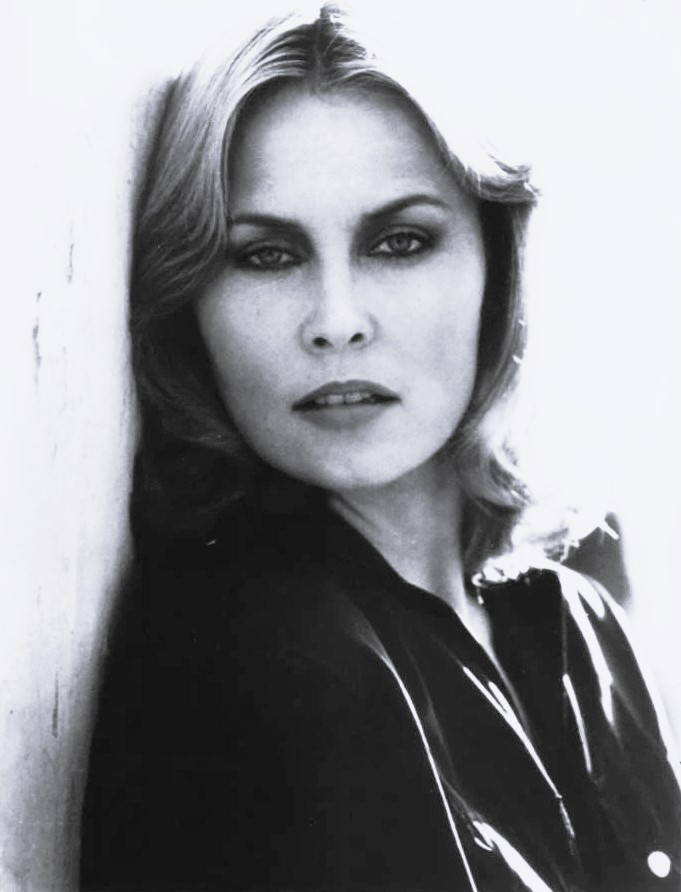
Cornelia Sharpe

Cornelia Sharpe is an American former actress and model. A frequent star in commercials in the late 1960s and early 1970s, she had lead roles in films such as Serpico (1973), The Next Man (1976), Cover Girls (1977), and S*H*E (1980). She was married to producer Martin Bregman.

== Early life and background ==
Sharpe was born in Selma, Alabama, to Warner Jack Sharpe Jr., a dental‑supplier, and Evelyn Horne Sharpe, a dental hygienist and secretary. She grew up in Jacksonville, Florida in a large, close-knit family; her mother was one of seven siblings, and her father one of five and she had many cousins. Sharpe has spoken candidly about her youthful tomboyish behavior as a child, recounting mischievous antics such as putting soap suds in swimming pools and egging a former boyfriend’s house. She graduated from Robert E. Lee High School in Jacksonville in 1961.

== Early career ==
Sharpe initially aspired to become a dental hygienist like her mother, but her interest in the performing arts was sparked early on by a cousin who was studying ballet. At sixteen, after being discovered by choreographer George Balanchine during his Florida tour, Sharpe moved to New York to pursue ballet. A chance opportunity to appear in a television commercial for Newport Cigarettes sparked her modeling career. Her outgoing personality distinguished her in the industry, and she subsequently appeared in around 200 commercials in eight years, a feat noted in Time magazine.

In 1969, Sharpe unexpectedly landed a role in the Broadway play The Penny Wars after an impromptu audition arranged by her agent. Despite no formal acting training at the time, she performed alongside notable figures such as David Merrick and Barbara Harris. This experience motivated her to study acting seriously, leading to additional stage roles including Woody Allen's Play It Again, Sam (1969).

== Film and television career ==
Sharpe's screen career began in the early 1970s. Her earliest credited film appearance is Kansas City Bomber (1972), in which she had a minor role as Tammy O’Brien. In 1973, she starred as Leslie, Al Pacino's girlfriend in Serpico. The film's producer, Martin Bregman, had insisted that the role be given to Sharpe in the film.

In 1974, Sharpe appeared in Open Season opposite Peter Fonda, John Phillip Law and Richard Lynch as Vietnam veterans who kidnap her and her older lover's characters and torment them in an isolated cabin in the woods. Sharpe also played Nora in The Reincarnation of Peter Proud. In 1976 she played Nicole Scott, a spy/assassin tasked with observing and possibly assassinating Sean Connery’s Saudi Arabian minister character in The Next Man. Sharpe said of her co-star: "He’s fabulous. He’s just like you and me. He’s very warm and a terrific guy who’s got his act together and deals with success beautifully." Roger Ebert of the Chicago Sun-Times, though critical of the plot, was impressed by Sharpe's performance, describing her as a "cool beauty." This was followed by Cover Girls (1977), a crime television film made for NBC in which she portrayed Linda Allen, a model caught up in an embezzlement ordeal.

In 1980, Sharpe played Lavinia Kean, the eponymous secret agent in the spy film S*H*E (1980). Her role was described as that of a "female James Bond". She then appeared opposite Sterling Hayden, Klaus Kinski and Sarah Miles in the British horror thriller Venom (1981), a film produced by Bregman, which was one of her last substantive film roles of that era. Films in Review wrote that Sharpe was "appallingly bad as the child's mother".

After Venom, Sharpe had fewer film appearances but resurfaced in small roles, such as in The Adventures of Pluto Nash (2002).

== Personal life ==
Sharpe married producer Martin Bregman in 1981, who died in 2018. The couple had one daughter.
