= Carlito's Way =

1993 film directed by Brian De Palma

- Theatrical release poster
- Directed by: Brian De Palma
- Screenplay by: David Koepp
- Based on: Carlito's Way and After Hours by Edwin Torres
- Produced by: Martin Bregman; Willi Baer; Michael S. Bregman
- Starring: Al Pacino; Sean Penn; Penelope Ann Miller
- Cinematography: Stephen H. Burum
- Edited by: Bill Pankow; Kristina Boden
- Music by: Patrick Doyle
- Production companies: Epic Productions; Bregman/Baer Productions
- Distributed by: Universal Pictures
- Release date: November 12, 1993
- Running time: 144 minutes
- Country: United States
- Language: English
- Budget: $30 million
- Box office: $64 million

Carlito's Way is a 1993 American crime drama film directed by Brian De Palma and written by David Koepp, based on the novels Carlito's Way (1975) and After Hours (1979) by Judge Edwin Torres. It stars Al Pacino, Sean Penn, Penelope Ann Miller, Luis Guzman, John Leguizamo, Jorge Porcel, Joseph Siravo and Viggo Mortensen.

Pacino portrays Carlito Brigante, a Nuyorican criminal who vows to go straight and to retire in Paradise. However, his criminal past proves difficult to escape, and he is unwillingly dragged into the same activities that got him imprisoned in the first place. The film is based mainly on After Hours, but it used the title of the first novel to avoid it being confused with Martin Scorsese's 1985 film. This is the second film collaboration with Pacino and De Palma, after Scarface (1983).

Carlito's Way was released on November 12, 1993, by Universal Pictures. It initially received mixed reviews from critics and lukewarm results at the box office, although general reception to the film has improved in subsequent years. The film has gained a strong cult following, and it is generally considered to be one of De Palma's most enduring films. Both Penn and Miller received Golden Globe nominations for their performances. A prequel titled Carlito's Way: Rise to Power, based on the first novel, was released direct-to-video in 2005.

== Plot ==
In 1975 in New York City, after having served five years of a thirty-year prison sentence, career criminal, Carlito Brigante, is freed on a legal technicality that has been exploited by his lawyer, and close friend, Dave Kleinfeld. Carlito vows to end his unlawful activities, but is persuaded to accompany his young cousin, Guajiro, to a drug deal at an illegal speakeasy. Guajiro's suppliers betray and kill him, forcing Carlito to shoot his way out. Carlito takes Guajiro's $30,000 from the botched deal and uses it to buy a stake in a nightclub that is owned by a gambling addict named Reinaldo Saso, intending to save $75,000 to retire to the Caribbean.

Carlito declines several offers for a business partnership with a hot-headed young gangster from the Bronx named Benny Blanco. Carlito also rekindles his romance with his former girlfriend Gail, a ballet dancer who moonlights as a stripper. Kleinfeld develops a love interest with Benny's girlfriend Steffie, a waitress at the club. Benny's frustration with Carlito's rejections comes to a head, and he confronts Carlito at his table. Carlito publicly humiliates Benny, who reacts by manhandling Steffie. Fueled by his now-extensive use of alcohol and cocaine, Kleinfeld brazenly pulls out a gun and threatens to kill Benny, but Carlito intervenes. Despite being personally threatened by Benny, Carlito lets him go unharmed, a decision that alienates him from his friend and bodyguard Pachanga.

Kleinfeld, who stole $1 million in a payoff from his client, Mafia boss Anthony "Tony T" Taglialucci, is coerced into providing his yacht to help Taglialucci break out of the Rikers Island prison barge. Kleinfeld begs for Carlito's assistance in the prison break, and Carlito reluctantly agrees. That night, Carlito, Kleinfeld and Taglialucci's son Frankie sail to a floating buoy outside of the barge where Taglialucci is waiting. As they pull Taglialucci aboard, Kleinfeld kills him and Frankie, then dumps their bodies in the East River, claiming to Carlito that the two would have killed him. Realizing that mob retaliation is imminent, Carlito severs his ties with Kleinfeld and decides to leave town with Gail. The next day, Kleinfeld is hospitalized after a mob hitman stabs him several times.

The police apprehend Carlito and take him to the office of District Attorney Bill Norwalk, where he learns that Kleinfeld has already agreed to perjure himself should Carlito be tried again. Despite being threatened with charges of being an accomplice to the Taglialucci murders, Carlito refuses to betray Kleinfeld. In the hospital, Carlito visits Kleinfeld, who confesses to selling him out. Having noticed a suspicious man dressed in a police uniform waiting in the lobby, Carlito secretly unloads Kleinfeld's revolver and leaves. The man is Taglialucci's other son Vinnie seeking vengeance for his brother and father. After sending away the real officer who is standing guard, Vinnie enters Kleinfeld's room. Kleinfeld tries to defend himself but his revolver is empty, and he gets shot to death.

Carlito buys train tickets to Miami for himself and Gail, now pregnant with their child. When he visits his club to get the stashed money, he is met by a group of East Harlem Italian gangsters led by Vinnie. The Italians plan to kill Carlito, but he manages to slip out through a secret exit. The Italians pursue him through the city's subway system into Grand Central Terminal, where they engage in a gunfight. Carlito kills all of his pursuers except Vinnie, whom the police shoot and kill.

As Carlito runs to catch the train where Gail and Pachanga are waiting for him, Benny ambushes him and fatally shoots him several times with a silenced gun. Pachanga admits to Carlito that he is now working for Benny, but the latter shoots Pachanga as well. Carlito hands a tearful Gail the money and tells her to escape with their unborn child and start a new life. As he dies, Carlito stares at a billboard with a Caribbean beach and a picture of a woman. The billboard comes to life in his mind, and the woman, now Gail, starts dancing.

== Cast ==
- Al Pacino as Carlito Brigante (called "Charlie" by Gail). Pacino came to Carlito's Way directly from his Academy Award-winning role in Scent of a Woman. To get into the character, he accompanied Edwin Torres through East Harlem to absorb the sights and atmosphere. Pacino first envisioned Carlito with a ponytail, but after visiting Harlem, he quickly realized that such a hairstyle was uncommon among the local men. The beard was Pacino's idea. The black leather coat fit into the period setting.
- Sean Penn as Dave Kleinfeld. For the pivotal role of Carlito's sleazy lawyer and best friend, Penn was lured back from early retirement by the challenge of playing the corrupt lawyer. Taking the role meant that he could finance his movie The Crossing Guard and work with Pacino. De Palma and Penn discussed what 1970s mob lawyers looked like. Penn shaved the hair on the front of his forehead to give the appearance of a receding hairline. He permed the rest. Alan Dershowitz, believing that Penn was attempting to look like him, threatened the filmmakers with a defamation lawsuit.
- Penelope Ann Miller as Gail. Casting for Gail proved difficult because of the character's striptease scenes. The character needed someone who was both a talented dancer and actor.
- John Leguizamo as Benny Blanco, "from the Bronx", an up-and-coming gangster who is determined to exceed Carlito's reputation but lacks any sense of ethics.
- Luis Guzmán as Pachanga. In David Koepp's first draft of the screenplay, Pachanga spoke in a very heavy slang style. Following rumbles from the Latino cast and crew, Koepp toned this down.
- James Rebhorn as District Attorney Bill Norwalk
- Viggo Mortensen as Lalin Miasso
- Richard Foronjy as Pete Amadesso
- Joseph Siravo as Vincent "Vinnie" Taglialucci, son of Tony T
- Adrian Pasdar as Frank "Frankie" Taglialucci, son of Tony T
- Jorge Porcel as Reinaldo "Ron" Saso
- Ingrid Rogers as Steffie
- Frank Minucci as Anthony "Tony T" Taglialucci
- John Agustin Ortiz as Guajiro
- Ángel Salazar as Walberto
- Al Israel as Rolando Rivas
- Rick Aviles as Quisqueya
- Jaime Sánchez as Rudy
- Edmonte Salvato as Joe Battaglia
- Paul Mazursky as Judge Feinstein
- Caesar Cordova as Barber
- Jon Seda as Dominican
- Chuck Zito as Bouncer
- Richard E. Council as Diamond Room Man
- Mel Gorham as Pachanga's Date
- Rocco Sisto as Panama Hatman
- John Finn as Detective Duncan
- Brian Tarantina as Detective Speller
- Jaime Tirelli as Detective Valentin
- John Michael Bolger as Cop
- Orlando Urdaneta as Bartender
- Michael P. Moran as Party Guest
- Vincent Pastore as Copa Wiseguy
- Garry Pastore as Copa Wiseguy
- Cynthia Lamontagne as Elevator Woman
- Bo Dietl as Casino Man
- Marc Anthony as Singer

== Production ==
Al Pacino first heard about the character Carlito Brigante in a YMCA gym in New York City in 1973. Pacino was doing physical training for his movie Serpico when he met New York State Supreme Court Judge Edwin Torres, the author writing the novels Carlito's Way and After Hours. When the novels were completed, Pacino read them and liked them, especially the character of Carlito.

Inspiration for the novels came from Torres' background: the East Harlem barrio where he was born and its atmosphere of gangs, drugs and poverty. In 1989, Pacino faced a $6 million lawsuit from film producer Elliott Kastner, who claimed that Pacino had reneged on an agreement to star in his version of a Carlito movie with Marlon Brando as criminal lawyer David Kleinfeld. The suit was dropped, and the project was abandoned.

Pacino went to producer Martin Bregman with the intention of getting a Carlito Brigante film made, and showed him an early draft of a screenplay. Bregman rejected the screenplay, but both Bregman and Pacino agreed that the character of Carlito would provide a suitable showcase for Pacino's talents. Bregman approached screenwriter David Koepp, who had just finished writing the script for Bregman's forthcoming film The Shadow, and asked him to write the script for Carlito's Way. It was decided that the screenplay would be based on the second novel After Hours. At that stage in his life, Carlito would be closer to Pacino's age. Although based primarily on the second novel, the title Carlito's Way remained, mainly to avoid confusion with Martin Scorsese's 1985 film After Hours. Bregman worked closely with Koepp for two years to develop the shooting script for Carlito's Way.

Koepp wrestled with the voice-over throughout the writing process. Initially, the voice-over was to take place in the hospital, but De Palma suggested the train station platform. The hospital scenes were rewritten 25 to 30 times because the actors had trouble with the sequence, with Pacino thinking that Carlito would not even go to the hospital. With one final rewrite, Koepp managed to make the scene work to Pacino's satisfaction. Kleinfeld does not die in the novels, but De Palma has a strong sense of justice and retribution — he could not stand to see Carlito killed and let Kleinfeld live.

At one point, The Long Good Friday director John Mackenzie was linked to the film. When Carlito's Way and its sequel After Hours were optioned, Martin Bregman had Abel Ferrara in mind to direct. When Bregman and Ferrara parted ways, De Palma was recruited. Bregman explained that this decision was not about "getting the old team back together," but rather making use of the best talent available. De Palma reluctantly read the script, but when Spanish-speaking characters became evident, he feared that it would be Scarface again. De Palma said that he did not want to make another Spanish-speaking gangster film.

When De Palma finally read it all the way through, he realized that the script was not what he thought it was. De Palma liked the script, and envisioned it as a film noir. Bregman supervised casting throughout the various stages of pre-production, and carefully selected the creative team who would make the film a reality. This included production designer Richard Sylbert, film editor Bill Pankow, costume designer Aude Bronson-Howard and director of photography Stephen Burum.

Filming initially began on March 22, 1993, although the first scheduled shoot, the Grand Central Station climax, had to be changed when Pacino arrived on crutches. Instead, the tension-building pool hall sequence, where Carlito accompanies his young cousin Guajiro (John Ortiz) on an ill-fated drug deal, started the production. De Palma felt that because the film was heavily character-based and featured little action, the early pool sequence had to be elaborate. A huge amount of time was spent setting up and filming it. After viewing a cut of the pool hall sequence, studio executives had a note passed to the crew stating that they felt the scene was too long. De Palma spent more time adding to the sequence, and made it work with the help of editor Bill Pankow.

Apart from the poster sequence, which was shot in Florida, the entire movie was filmed on location in New York. De Palma roamed Manhattan searching for suitable locations. A tenement on 115th Street became the site of Carlito's homecoming: the barrio scene. The courtroom scene, in which Carlito thanks prosecutor Bill Norwalk (James Rebhorn), was shot in Torres' workplace, the State Supreme Court Building at 60 Centre Street. The club Paradise was modeled on a West Side brownstone, but that was considered too cramped for filming. A multi-level bistro club designed by De Palma took shape at the Kaufman Astoria Studios in Long Island City, in the style of a 1970s art deco discotheque.

Tony Taglialucci (Frank Minucci)'s escape from Rikers Island, set in a river at night, was considered impossible to shoot on location. Instead, the production used a Brooklyn shipyard where Kleinfeld (Sean Penn)'s boat was lowered into an empty lock into which river water was pumped. Smoke machines and towers of space lights were installed.

For the climactic finale, De Palma staged a chase from the platform of the Harlem-125th Street station to the escalators of Grand Central Terminal. For the shoot, trains were re-routed and timed for Pacino and his pursuers to dart from car to hurtling car. The length of the escalator scene during the climactic gunfight at Grand Central Station caused a headache for editor Pankow. He had to piece together the sequences so that the audience would be so tied up in the action that they would not think about how long the escalator was running.

== Reception ==
Carlito's Way wrapped production on July 20, 1993, and was released on November 3, 1993. Opening weekend box office ticket sales totaled over $9 million. At the end of its theatrical run, the film had grossed more than $37 million in the United States and Canada, and $27 million overseas, for a total of $64 million.

Critical response to the theatrical release was somewhat lukewarm. The film was criticized for retreading old ground, mainly in regard to De Palma's earlier films Scarface and The Untouchables.

The film has an approval rating of 84% on Rotten Tomatoes, based on 51 reviews. The site's consensus states: "Carlito's Way reunites De Palma and Pacino for a more wistful take on the crime epic, delivering a stylish thriller with a beating heart beneath its pyrotechnic performances and set pieces." On Metacritic, the film holds a weighted average score of 66/100 based on 25 critics, indicating "generally favorable" reviews. Audiences polled by CinemaScore gave the film an average grade of "B+" on an A+ to F scale.

Roger Ebert of the Chicago Sun-Times stated in his review that the film was one of De Palma's finest, with some of the best set pieces he had done. On the syndicated At the Movies television show, Ebert gave the film a thumbs up, while Gene Siskel of the Chicago Tribune gave it a thumbs down.

Peter Travers of Rolling Stone criticized the film for Pacino's "Rican" accent that slips into his "Southern drawl from Scent of a Woman," De Palma's "erratic pacing and derivative shootouts," and wondered "what might have been if Carlito's Way had forged new ground and not gone down smokin' in the shadow of Scarface."

Owen Gleiberman of Entertainment Weekly described the film as "a competent and solidly unsurprising urban-underworld thriller," and as "okay entertainment," but went on to say that the plot would have worked better "as a lean-and-mean Miami Vice episode."

Patrick Doyle was praised for his film score, which was described as "elegiac" and "hauntingly beautiful," and was said to display Doyle as "one of the major talents of modern film scoring."

Bregman was surprised by some of the negative reviews, but stated that some of the same reviewers had since "retracted" their views in further discussions of the film. A few weeks before the film's premiere, De Palma told the crew not to get their hopes up about the film's reception. He correctly predicted that Pacino, having just won an Academy Award, would be criticized; Koepp, having just done Jurassic Park, would "suck"; Penn would be "brilliant" because he had not done anything for a while; and De Palma, having not been forgiven for The Bonfire of the Vanities, would not quite be embraced.

Sean Penn and Penelope Ann Miller both received Golden Globe nominations for their respective roles as Kleinfeld and Gail. More recent appreciation of the film was highlighted when the French publication Cahiers du Cinéma named it as one of the three best films of the 1990s, along with The Bridges of Madison County and Goodbye South, Goodbye.

=== Accolades ===
Award	Category	Subject	Result
CFCA Award	Best Supporting Actor	Sean Penn	Nominated
David di Donatello Awards	Best Foreign Actor	Al Pacino	Nominated
Golden Globe Awards	Best Supporting Actor – Motion Picture	Sean Penn	Nominated
Golden Globe Awards	Best Supporting Actress – Motion Picture	Penelope Ann Miller	Nominated
Nastro d'Argento	Best Male Dubbing	Giancarlo Giannini (for dubbing Al Pacino in the Italian version)	Won

== Music ==
Patrick Doyle composed the original score, while musical supervisor Jellybean Benitez supplemented the soundtrack with elements of salsa, merengue and other authentic styles.

=== Score ===
Carlito's Way: Original Motion Picture Score
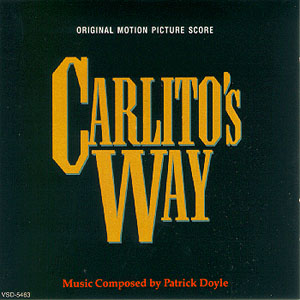

Film score by Patrick Doyle
- Released: 1993
- Genre: Soundtrack
- Label: Varese Sarabande

Professional ratings
Review scores
Source	Rating
AllMusic	4/5 stars
Music Week	3/5 stars

No.	Title	Length
1.	"Carlito's Way"	05:17
2.	"Carlito and Gail"	04:05
3.	"The Cafe"	01:59
4.	"Laline"	02:36
5.	"You're Over, Man"	02:09
6.	"Where's My Cheesecake?"	02:12
7.	"The Buoy"	04:04
8.	"The Elevator"	01:45
9.	"There's an Angle Here"	02:18
10.	"Grand Central"	10:08
11.	"Remember Me"	04:52

=== Soundtrack ===
Carlito's Way: Music From The Motion Picture

Soundtrack album by Various Artists
- Released: November 9, 1993
- Genre: Soundtrack
- Label: Sony

No.	Title	Artist	Length
1.	"I Love Music"	Rozalla	4:52
2.	"Rock the Boat"	The Hues Corporation	3:09
3.	"That's the Way (I Like It)"	KC and the Sunshine Band	3:06
4.	"Rock Your Baby"	Ed Terry	3:44
5.	"Parece Mentira"	Marc Anthony	5:26
6.	"Back Stabbers"	The O'Jays	3:09
7.	"TSOP (The Sound of Philadelphia)"	MFSB	3:38
8.	"Got to Be Real"	Cheryl Lynn	5:07
9.	"Lady Marmalade"	Labelle	3:57
10.	"Pillow Talk"	Sinoa	3:49
11.	"El Watusi"	Ray Barretto	2:40
12.	"Oye Como Va"	Santana	4:17
13.	"You Are So Beautiful"	Billy Preston	4:50

== Releases ==
The film was released on VHS and LaserDisc in fullscreen and widescreen versions. For the LaserDisc version, this would be a THX certified release. It was eventually released on DVD in 2004, with an Ultimate Edition in 2005. The Ultimate Edition DVD includes deleted scenes, an interview with De Palma, a "making-of" documentary, and more. In 2007, an HD DVD version was released that features the same bonus material as the Ultimate Edition. The film was released on Blu-ray on May 18, 2010.

== Prequel ==
A prequel based on Edwin Torres' first novel was released direct-to-video in 2005, with the title Carlito's Way: Rise to Power. Critically panned, the film nevertheless received Torres' blessing as an accurate adaptation of the first novel.

== Bibliography ==
- Universal Pictures, Carlito's Way "Press Pack," 1993.
- Highbury Entertainment, "The Making Of Carlito's Way," Hotdog Magazine, 2000.
