= S*H*E =

1980 film by Robert Lewis

- Theatrical release poster
- Written by: Richard Maibaum
- Directed by: Robert Michael Lewis
- Starring: Cornelia Sharpe; Omar Sharif
- Music by: Michael Kamen
- Countries of origin: West Germany; United States
- Original language: English

Production
- Producer: Martin Bregman
- Cinematography: Jules Brenner
- Editor: Michael Economou
- Running time: 100 minutes

Original release
- Release: February 23, 1980

S*H*E* or S+H+E: Security Hazards Expert is a 1980 spy film concerning a sexy undercover female espionage agent. Starring Cornelia Sharpe and Omar Sharif, it was written by Richard Maibaum and is a Martin Bregman production. The main title song was performed by Linda Gaines.

== Cast ==
- Cornelia Sharpe as Lavinia Kean aka S*H*E*
- Omar Sharif as Baron Cesare Magnasco
- Robert Lansing as Owen Hooper aka Hunt
- Anita Ekberg as Dr. Elsa Biebling
- Fabio Testi as Rudolf Caserta
- William Traylor as Lacey
- Isabella Rye as Fanya
- Thom Christopher as Eddie Bronzi
- Mario Colli - Mucci
- Claudio Ruffini as La Rue
- Geoffrey Copleston as the U.N. Speaker
- Fortunato Arena -as a Paesano
- Gino Marturano as Major Danilo
- Emilio Messina as Zec
- Rory Maclean
- Fritz Hammer

== Production ==
Director Lewis says he did the film "because it was three months in Rome on someone else's money" but that he felt Maibaum's script "was awful and I think I almost had nothing to do with him. My ex wife did the rewrite and off we went.

Lewis says Ekberg was "very difficult" to work with but executive producer Martin Bergman refused to fire her. Lewis decided to fire her anyway but rehired her when she promised to behave which she did. He also said Cornelia Sharpe needed a lot of takes, which caused friction with Omar Sharif who did not.
