= Open Season (1974 film) =

1974 film directed by Peter Collinson

- US film poster
- Directed by: Peter Collinson
- Screenplay by: David Osborn; Liz Charles-Williams
- Based on: The All Americans by David Osborn
- Produced by: José S. Vicuña
- Starring: Peter Fonda; Cornelia Sharpe; John Phillip Law; Richard Lynch; Alberto Mendoza; William Holden
- Cinematography: Fernando Arribas
- Edited by: Alan Pattillo
- Music by: Ruggero Cini
- Production companies: Arpa Productions; Impala
- Distributed by: Columbia Pictures
- Release date: 1974
- Running time: 104 minutes
- Countries: United Kingdom; Spain
- Language: English

Open Season is a 1974 thriller film directed by Peter Collinson. It stars Peter Fonda, John Phillip Law, William Holden, Mabel Escaño and Cornelia Sharpe. The film was shot in both Spain and England, with parts of those countries used to portray the American backwoods. The screenplay was by David Osborn and Liz Charles Williams, based on Osborn's novel.

== Plot ==
The film follows three Vietnam veterans who are stimulated by violence, and by the subjugation and debasement of those they victimize. Every year they go on vacation in the wilderness, where they engage in a spree of brutality and violence. They choose unsuspecting pairs of victims and hunt them down like wild animals. This year, they decide to kidnap a middle-aged man and his young mistress. After enduring an intense period of sexual manipulation, beatings, and humiliation, the two victims are eventually given time to try and escape after which they will be tracked down and killed. Both make a break, separately, but are found and killed by their tormentors. At the end, one by one, the killers themselves are eliminated by an unknown stalker. He is revealed to be the father of a girl who was raped by the group prior to their military service, and who subsequently committed suicide after giving birth.

== Cast ==
- Peter Fonda as Ken
- Cornelia Sharpe as Nancy Stillman
- John Phillip Law as Greg
- Richard Lynch as Art
- Alberto de Mendoza as Martin
- William Holden as Hal Wolkowski
- May Heatherly as Alicia Rennick
- Mabel Escaño as waitress

== Production ==
Fonda later said "I had a good time on that one. That was my first chance to play a really evil guy. I liked working with Richard Lynch and John Phillip Law. We shot it just outside Madrid and in Detroit. "

- Theme song 'Casting Shadows' composer and performer: John Howard
