= Carlito's Way (novel) =

1975 novel by Edwin Torres

- First edition
- Author: Edwin Torres
- Language: English
- Genre: Crime
- Published: 1975
- Publisher: E. P. Dutton & Co.
- Publication place: United States

Carlito's Way is a 1975 American crime novel written by Edwin Torres. The novel and its 1979 sequel After Hours were the basis of the 1993 Brian De Palma film Carlito's Way as well as the 2005 prequel film Carlito's Way: Rise to Power.

== Production ==
Torres has stated that Brigante was a combination of several men he knew in his street days, as well as a compilation of several of his own personal characteristics.

== Plot ==
The life and times of a Nuyorican gangster, Carlos Brigante Jr., better known as Carlito Brigante, spanning from the 1930s till the year 1970.

== Film ==
Brigante has been portrayed by Al Pacino in the 1993 film Carlito's Way, and by Jay Hernandez in the prequel Carlito's Way: Rise to Power.
