= After Hours (novel) =

1979 Edwin Torres crime novel

- First edition
- Author: Edwin Torres
- Language: English
- Genre: Crime
- Published: 1979
- Publisher: The Dial Press
- Publication place: United States

After Hours is a 1979 American crime novel written by Edwin Torres and is the sequel to Carlito's Way (1975). Both novels served as the basis of the 1993 Brian De Palma film Carlito's Way.

== Plot ==
An ex-con, Carlito Brigante, tries one more round in the rackets before going straight.
