= Serpico =

1973 film directed by Sidney Lumet

- Theatrical release poster
- Directed by: Sidney Lumet
- Screenplay by: Waldo Salt; Norman Wexler
- Based on: Serpico: The Cop Who Defied the System (1973 biography) by Peter Maas
- Produced by: Martin Bregman
- Starring: Al Pacino
- Cinematography: Arthur J. Ornitz
- Edited by: Dede Allen
- Music by: Mikis Theodorakis
- Production companies: De Laurentiis International Manufacturing Company; Artists Entertainments Complex
- Distributed by: Paramount Pictures
- Release dates: December 5, 1973 (New York City); December 18, 1973 (Los Angeles); February 6, 1974 (United States)
- Running time: 130 minutes
- Country: United States
- Language: English
- Budget: $3.3 million
- Box office: $29.8 million (US/Canada) $23.4 million (worldwide rentals)

Serpico is a 1973 American biographical crime drama film directed by Sidney Lumet and starring Al Pacino in the title role, former New York City police officer Frank Serpico. The screenplay was adapted by Waldo Salt and Norman Wexler from the book written by Peter Maas, with the assistance of its subject. The story details Serpico's struggle with corruption within the New York City Police Department during his eleven years of service, and his work as a whistleblower which led to the investigation by the Knapp Commission.

Producer Dino De Laurentiis purchased the rights from Maas. Agent Martin Bregman joined the film as co-producer. Bregman suggested Pacino for the main part, and John G. Avildsen was hired to direct the film. Pacino met with Serpico to prepare for the role early in the summer of 1973. After Avildsen was dismissed, Lumet was hired as his replacement. On a short notice, he selected the shooting locations and organized the scenes; the production was filmed in July and August.

On its release, Serpico became a critical and commercial success. At the same time, the film drew criticism from police officers. It received nominations at the Academy Awards and BAFTA Awards. Pacino earned the Golden Globe Award for Best Actor – Motion Picture Drama, while Salt and Wexler received the Writers Guild of America Award for Best Adapted Screenplay.

== Plot ==
On the evening of February 3, 1971, NYPD Detective Frank Serpico is rushed to the hospital, having been shot in the face. Police Chief Sidney Green fears that Serpico was shot by another cop. Serpico's story is shown in a flashback.

Serpico graduates from the police academy on March 5, 1960, with big ideas for improving the police force's community relations. He dresses like an actual civilian instead of wearing the department's standard plainclothes dress, which is easily recognizable. While he is chasing a burglar, other officers fail to recognize him as one of their own and shoot at him. He survives, but realizes that deviating from protocols can be dangerous.

In 1967, Serpico reports an attempted bribe to a high-ranking investigator, who chuckles and advises him to keep the money. Serpico soon learns that corruption is rampant in the department. Forced to accompany officers as they collect payoffs from criminals and small businesses, Serpico refuses to accept his share of the money. He makes several attempts to alert superiors to the corruption but is rebuffed every time. Other officers learn that he is reporting them, and he begins to fear for his life.

Serpico and his well-connected friend Blair go to the mayor's assistant, who promises a real investigation and support but is stymied by political pressure. Ostracized, frustrated and fearful, Serpico sinks into depression, which ruins his relationship with his girlfriend. He begins brutalizing well-connected suspects who had been bribing his superiors and thought themselves protected. Finally, Serpico informs his Captain that he reported his experiences to agencies outside of the NYC police force. Furious, the captain informs the other officers.

Blair uses his connections to arrange a personal interview with the district attorney, who tells Serpico that if he testifies to a grand jury, a major investigation will follow. The DA limits his questions and prevents Serpico from revealing the ubiquity of corruption in the police force. Serpico and Blair take their story to The New York Times on April 25, 1970. After his allegations are published, his superiors retaliate by assigning Serpico to a high-risk Brooklyn narcotics squad.

During a raid on a drug trafficker's apartment on February 3, 1971, Serpico's partners hold him back at a critical moment, and he gets shot in the face. After a long, painful recovery, he testifies before the Knapp Commission, a governmental inquiry into NYPD corruption. Afterward, Serpico resigns from the NYPD on June 15, 1972, and is awarded the NYPD Medal of Honor for "conspicuous bravery in action". He then leaves the U.S. and settles in Switzerland.

== Cast ==
- Al Pacino as NYPD Police Detective Frank Serpico
- John Randolph as NYPD Police Chief Sidney Green
- Jack Kehoe as Tom Keough
- Biff McGuire as Captain McClain
- Barbara Eda-Young as Laurie
- Cornelia Sharpe as Leslie
- Tony Roberts as Bob Blair
- Allan Rich as D.A. Tauber
- Norman Ornellas as Rubello
- Edward Grover as Inspector Lombardo
- Albert Henderson as Peluce
- Hank Garrett as Malone
- Damien Leake as Joey
- Joseph Bova as Potts
- Gene Gross as Captain Tolkin
- Woodie King as Larry
- James Tolkin as Steiger
- Bernard Barrow as Palmer
- Nathan George as Smith
- Alan North as Brown
- Lewis J. Stadlen as Berman
- Ted Beniades as Sarno
- John Lehne as Gilbert
- M. Emmet Walsh as Chief Gallagher
- Charles White as Delaney
- F. Murray Abraham as Serpico's Partner (uncredited)
- Judd Hirsch as a cop
- Tracey Walter as Street Urchin (uncredited)
- Sully Boyar as Principal (uncredited)

== Background ==
After Frank Serpico recovered from being shot, he helped Peter Maas write Serpico. Detective David Durk, who also appeared in front of the Knapp Commission, planned to sell the rights of their story for a film adaptation. Early negotiations included Paul Newman in the role of Durk, and Robert Redford as Serpico. Serpico distanced himself from the project, as he felt that he would be merely portrayed as a sidekick. Script writer John Gregory Dunne turned down the project, for he felt that "there was no story". Director Sam Peckinpah, as well as Newman and Redford, left the project.

After the success of several of his films in the 1960s, and the first years of the 1970s, producer Dino De Laurentiis decided to move from Italy to the United States. The change in financing laws further regulated the Italian film industry, and the producer settled in New York City. Following their collaboration on The Valachi Papers, De Laurentiis purchased the rights to Maas's book. Maas received US$400,000 (equivalent to $2.9 million in 2025) and participation in the film, while the rights for his work were secured before the March 1973 publication of the book. Initially, De Laurentiis found resistance to the project from Paramount Pictures. The studio considered that "enough cop movies" had been made. In turn, De Laurentiis was supported by Charles Bluhdorn, president of Gulf+Western, who wanted the film to be made. De Laurentiis later declared that "no American producer would have had the courage" to depict police corruption in a motion picture.

Maas's agent Sam Cohn was approached by agent Martin Bregman. Bregman expressed his interest to produce the film after reading an article in New York magazine about the book. Bregman proposed one of his signed actors, Al Pacino, to play the lead. Waldo Salt was chosen to write the screenplay adaptation. The first draft did not impress Maas, De Laurentiis nor Bregman. Bregman felt that the result was "very political", and that the story did not reflect what the producers desired to portray in the film. Bregman and Maas directed Salt to the parts of the book that they envisioned to be reflected on the screenplay. The second draft was considered to be a substantial improvement by the production team. Bregman took the treatment to Pacino, who initially did not find the film interesting. Salt visited Pacino with the re-worked script that convinced him to consider the part. A meeting with Serpico, Maas and Pacino was arranged for the actor to meet the subject of the film. After meeting him, Pacino was fully convinced to accept the part. John G. Avildsen was chosen to direct the film.

One time we were out at my rented beach house in Montauk. We were sitting there looking at the water. And I thought, Well, I might as well be like everybody else and ask a silly question, which was, "Why, Frank? Why did you do it?" He said, "Well, Al, I don't know. I guess I have to say it would be because...if I didn't, who would I be when I listened to a piece of music?" I mean, what a way of putting it! That's the kind of guy he was. I enjoyed being with him. There was mischief in his eyes.

— Al Pacino

Salt's work did not satisfy Avildsen, who threatened to leave the project unless he could bring Norman Wexler to write the screenplay. They had previously worked together in Avildsen's Joe. Both traveled to Switzerland to visit Serpico at home and work the details. Time to work on the production was constricted due to Pacino's commitment to The Godfather Part II. Further disagreement arose between Avildsen and Bregman regarding the script and the selection of the filming locations. In response to resistance to his plans, Avildsen threatened Bregman of quitting multiple times. An aggravated Bregman called for a meeting with the production team to cause the director to quit in front of witnesses.

Avildsen had insisted on a meeting with Bregman and De Laurentiis to shoot a scene in the real home of Serpico's parents for authenticity. The producers felt that the structure could not accommodate the production team and equipment efficiently. The escalating tension on the meeting resulted in De Laurentiis firing Avildsen, and the director quit in return. Avildsen's account for the reason of his dismissal was that he refused to cast Bregman's then-girlfriend (and later wife) Cornelia Sharpe as Leslie. Avildsen would later declare that he should have treated the situation "with more finesse". Sidney Lumet was hired to complete the job for his reputation as an effective director under a tight schedule.

Pacino was shortly distracted from the project by an offer to play the lead in Lenny, but ultimately he turned it down. To prepare for Serpico, he rode with police officers for a night, but he decided that it was not enough. A method actor, he felt that he needed to spend time with Serpico. Pacino and Serpico met several times in Montauk, New York, where the actor rented a house for the summer. Pacino was moved by Serpico's conviction to reform the NYPD, and became more committed to the project. In character, Pacino often walked through areas of the city that were considered dangerous at the time. While waiting in traffic, he attempted to arrest a truck driver, for he was enraged by the exhaust fumes. He was refused service at a Manhattan restaurant for the appearance that he kept for the film.

== Production ==
Sidney Lumet organized the 107 speaking parts that took place in 104 different locations. The longest scenes took up two-and-a-half pages of the screenplay, while the average was one page.

A budget of $3.3 million (equivalent to $23.9 million in 2025) was assigned. Two weeks of rehearsals were held. Pacino had learned Salt's screenplay, and he agreed with Lumet that Wexler's revised version improved the structure, but that the dialogue was impoverished. Lumet allowed the actors to improvise certain dialogues, and he also allowed their creative input for the scenes. The cast selected dialogues from both scripts as the filming progressed. Although he already had a good knowledge of New York locations, Lumet considered the work "physically brutal, and emotionally tough".

The principal photography on Serpico began in early July 1973. The film was planned to be released before Christmas, with four-and-a-half months for the crew to complete the movie. Filming took place in July and August. The story of the film encompassed 11 years, from 1960 through 1971.

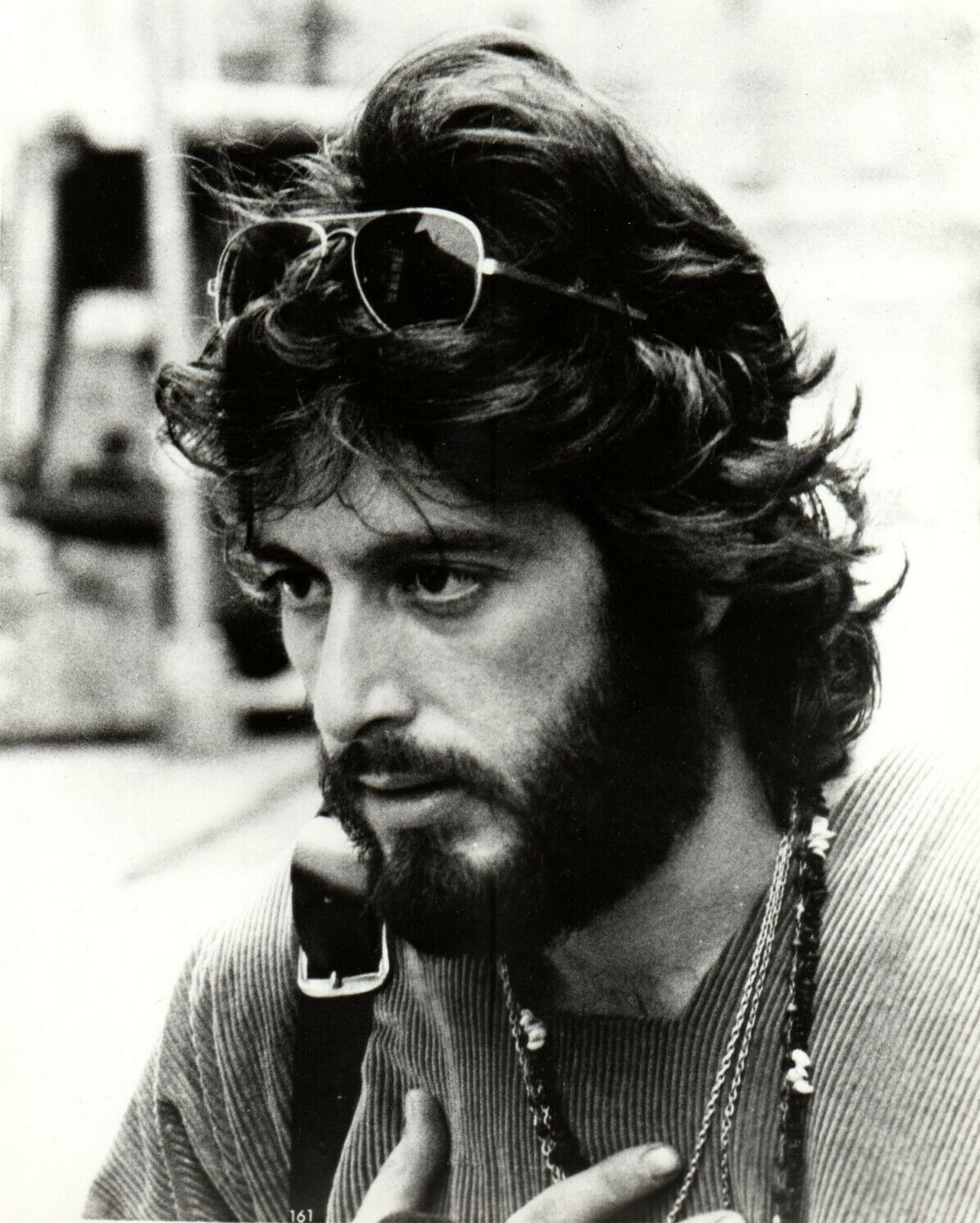
Pacino as Frank Serpico in a publicity portrait

To accommodate the scenes around Pacino's facial hair, the film was shot in reverse. Pacino started with long beard and hair. He was shaved to a mustache, and eventually, his hair was cut and he was clean-shaven for the beginning of the film. Lumet decided each day if Pacino was to be further shaven, and the crew prepared fake beards in case they were required. Winter conditions were simulated, as the team had to defoliate trees and cut shrubs. Special makeup was used to absorb the sweat, and to keep the actors' skin dry. The cast wore winter coats, and their skin was made to look bluish, while their breath had to be visible.

The director followed Serpico's desire for the winter to look "cold and heavy", and the summer "idyllic and hazy". The team had difficulty to find locations suitable for the scenes set in the 1960s, since graffiti did not become common until 1970. Lumet shot up to 35 different setups daily. The team had to move three times a day on average. Each location had to be cleared of cars that did not belong to the particular period, and extras could not feature long hair nor non-period wardrobe. Hairdressers were present with the crew. Multiple locations in the city including Harlem, the South Bronx, Bedford–Stuyvesant, Brooklyn and Astoria, Queens, were used. Lewisohn Stadium was featured shortly before its demolition. The party scene was shot at Sidney Kingsley's Fifth Avenue loft. The NYPD cooperated with the director and allowed him to film in four active police stations.

Serpico's apartment had to be built by the crew. It featured a fixed ceiling and movable walls. As with Serpico's original apartment, it was located in Greenwich Village. Through lighting, Lumet and cinematographer Arthur Ornitz chose to maintain a "warm look" on the location. Different techniques were used to reflect moods, and the changes of the years through which the character went.

Lumet focused on portraying Serpico's struggle to balance his work and personal life, and his increased isolation and alienation, as his efforts produced slow results. The director decided to portray him "darker and darker". As the film progressed, the cast costumes became darker in color, until the courtroom scene in which all the actors wore dark tones. Lumet told Charles Champlin, "I was trying to negate color, to make a picture in color that was not colorful." Meanwhile, he wanted Serpico's fellow officers to be "men with charm, who were all the more evil for being human and understandable". Lumet finished shooting the film in 51 days, on budget.

The film is edited by Dede Allen. Allen received the scenes from Lumet directly after they were shot. She had a limit of 48 hours to finish her work for its delivery to the sound department. Lumet did not want to add a score to the picture, but he decided that he would do it before De Laurentiis commissioned one. He learned that Mikis Theodorakis was released from prison in Greece. He was able to locate him in Paris, as the composer quickly left his country of origin. Theodorakis accepted Lumet's offer, and flew to New York City the next day. He met with the director, who played the movie for him the day of his arrival. Theodorakis agreed that it should not have a soundtrack, but he offered a composition of his to add to the film. Theodorakis had arranged a tour of the United States with a Greek orchestra and told Lumet that he could not be present for the spotting session. Lumet offered the help of Bob James, who would sit with the director for the spotting. To inform of the progress of the sessions and possible changes on the arrangements, James flew to the cities where Theodorakis appeared to work the details.

== Release ==
The film was released on December 5, 1973, in New York and on December 18 in Los Angeles. The opening week in New York garnered $123,000. Serpico was released nationwide on February 6, 1974. The film was a critical and commercial success. It grossed $29.8 million in the United States and Canada, generating $14.6 million in theatrical rentals. It earned theatrical rentals worldwide of $23.4 million.

Serpico attended the premiere of the film, but he did not finish watching it. Serpico felt "distant" from the results. In an interview with Pauline Kael for The New Yorker, he concluded that it "didn't give a sense of the frustration you feel when you're not able to do anything".

According to Lumet's account, he met Serpico shortly before the production. The director asked him to stay clear of the set, to not make Pacino "self-conscious" regarding his portrayal. Serpico watched the film in its entirety for the first time in 2010. In a later interview, he declared that Lumet barred him from the set after he interrupted the shooting of a scene that in real life "never happened". Serpico also criticized the dismissal of Avildsen by the production team. Serpico and Avildsen remained friends, and shared a property on Long Island for three years in the 1980s.

New York City Police Commissioner Michael Codd stated that the film "tends to imply that Serpico was the only honest cop in the whole department". Detective Durk was not pleased with Serpico. Durk, who was depicted in the character of Bob Blair, felt that the movie would deter other policemen to denounce corruption. In an interview with The New York Times, he considered the movie to be unfair to honest police officers. Durk stated that the end of the film conveyed that "the cost of honesty is martyrdom", and Serpico's departure for Switzerland showed him "wounded and frustrated".

Meanwhile, Bronx district attorney Burton B. Roberts declared that it "bears absolutely no relationship to the truth". Lumet defended his artistic license on the portrayal of the story, as he felt he desired to make a film that "people believed in". Bregman dismissed the critics, as he felt that the real names were not relevant for viewers in cities outside New York. Maas dismissed Durk's claims regarding honest policemen and asked, "Where were they?"

== Critical reception ==
=== Premiere reception ===
The New York Times felt that the film was "galvanizing" for Pacino's performance and the "tremendous intensity" of Lumet's direction. The publication also considered the film "disquieting" for its use of fictional names, as the reviewer felt that it diminished the role of Durk. Meanwhile, it called Theodorakis's soundtrack "redundant and dumb".

The New York Daily News delivered a favorable review of the film. It rated it four stars out of five, and called it "a triumph of intelligence, compassion and style". A follow-up critique by the publication deemed Pacino's acting a "masterful performance", as the reviewer remarked that "he walks like a cop. He talks like a cop. He even seems to think as a cop." The review also praised Lumet and his "talent for achieving social realism".

The Record considered it "one of the finest films of the year". Although it felt that the portrayal of Serpico was "too righteous and obsessive", the review favored Pacino, but felt that his performance was "sometimes a little too intense". It praised the photography of New York City as authentic, and credited Ornitz and Allen's work for it.

The Village Voice wrote a mixed review. It criticized the focus of the film on Serpico, and the minor role that the screenplay writers gave to the character that represented Durk. The reviewer considered that Serpico was "worth seeing" for Pacino's performance.

Variety deemed Pacino's acting "outstanding", and Lumet's a combination of "gritty action and thought-provoking comment".

For Newhouse News Services, it was an "exciting movie", but the review remarked that it was "weakened" by its focus on Serpico. The news agency attributed the minimization of the other characters to avoid "possible lawsuits".

The Los Angeles Times acclaimed Serpico. Charles Champlin called Pacino "one of the handful of genuine star actors in American films". Salt and Wexler's screenplay was hailed as "almost documentary reality", and its treatment of the main character "a complex and evolving portrait". The reviewer also remarked that the romances and break-ups were presented with "unhackneyed honesty". The contributions of the supporting cast were well noted. Champlin felt that Allen's work was considered to be "high on the list" for an Academy Award nomination, and deemed Theodorakis's music "effective".

=== Wide release reception ===
Gene Siskel of the Chicago Tribune gave the film three-and-a-half stars out of four, noting its treatment of corruption as its "principal strength and weakness", and adding that Serpico "loses the perspective" that "corruption ... begins and ends with individuals making active and passive decisions".

The Philadelphia Inquirer celebrated the film's critique of police corruption, despite its "embellishments and omissions" on the story. Pacino's performance was called "riveting", and the piece praised the "sharply individualized characterizations" by Tony Roberts, Jack Kehoe, John Randolph, Biff McGuire, Barbara Eda-Young and Cornelia Sharpe.

Meanwhile, also for Philadelphia Inquirer, investigative journalist Greg Walter lamented its portrayal of police officers as "snarling, insipid ass(es)". Walter felt that Maas's book was "coldly objective", but that the director's work delivered characters that were "one-dimensional caricatures".

The Boston Globe welcomed Lumet's "melodramatic efficiency". The publication considered the story "heavily repetitious", but favored its "quick pace". It regarded Ornitz's camerawork as "the right documentary look", while it lamented Theodorakis's score as "disruptive" and "out of character".

Esquire further criticized Theodorakis, as the reviewer opined that his "composing voice ought to be silenced". Meanwhile, the piece praised Allen's work.

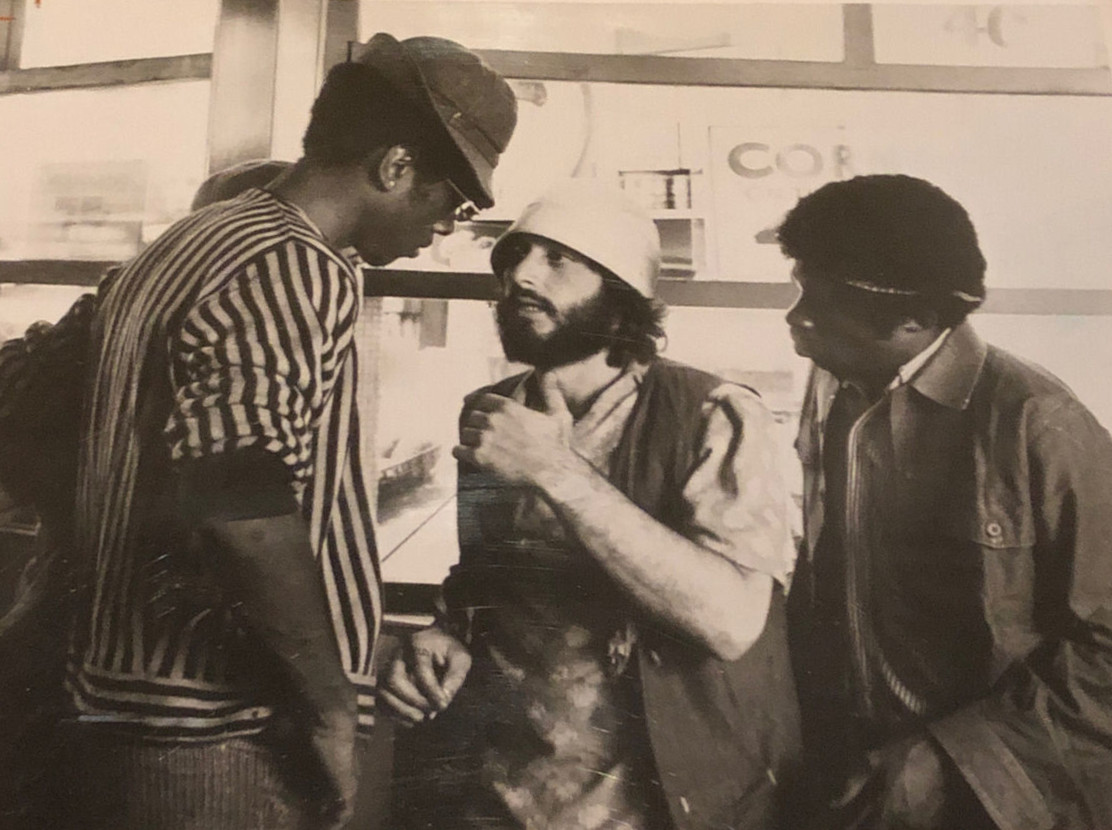
Pacino sporting a beard and undercover outfit in a scene

The Miami Herald hailed the use of "street talk" instead of the "language of actors and actresses" by Salt, Wexler and Maas. It praised Lumet and Ornitz's photography that "generate the smells, sounds and styles of the city". It considered Pacino's acting "predictably excellent", and it favored Theodorakis's music.

The Detroit Free Press suggested that Serpico would be a breakthrough role for Pacino as an actor, and called his work "fascinating". The newspaper defined the film as an "encouraging morality tale".

Meanwhile, San Francisco Examiner observed Pacino's acting to be "a brilliant, solidly thought out performance". The publication added that the supporting cast's contributions "never satisfactorily fleshed out". Regarding Lumet, the reviewer felt that he directed the film with "skill and vigor".

The Cincinnati Enquirer attributed the commercial success of the film to Pacino's acting, and to the film's depiction of "hard, cold, grit and grime reality".

For The Evening Sun reviewer, Lou Cedrone expressed his doubts about Durk's "gratis talk of defamation of the police image". Cedrone considered that Durk "comes off very nicely" on the film, and defended Lumet's choice to "emphasize the action rather than the definition". Meanwhile, it viewed the use of "Neapolitan" music as "foolish perhaps, but not touching". It declared Pacino's contribution "a magnificent performance".

The Pittsburgh Post-Gazette found Serpico to be "meticulously crafted, intelligently written, unflinchingly honest". The publication noted the "fidelity" with which the director captured New York, and that the city "becomes more than just a background". It summed Pacino's acting as "naturalistic, flawlessly convincing".

The Honolulu Advertiser attributed Pacino's "brilliant portrayal" to turn an "ordinary cop movie" into "extraordinary". The review favored Lumet, the writers and the supporting cast.

The Austin American-Statesman highlighted realism in producing a "fascinating film".

The Fort Worth Star-Telegram celebrated Pacino's "towering performance". Roberts's performance was noted as a "standout". Sharpe and Eda Young's appearances as Serpico's love interests were deemed to be "played with restrained excellence". The newspaper opined that the film was "15 minutes too long", but that viewers would not "realize the length until you're outside looking at your watch".

The Kansas City Star detailed the criticism that the film received from police officers, and Serpico's discontent with the production. The piece noted that despite the fictional additions, Serpico was a "superrealistic dramatization". Meanwhile, Wexler and Salt were praised for the authentic use of profanity in the dialogues.

The Times in Shreveport, Louisiana, opened its review applauding Serpico's denunciation of police corruption, while it pointed out that the film "exceeds (the) expectations" of the viewers for it to be "powerfully dramatic". Lumet's "accurate eye for surroundings" was remarked, and the reviewer hailed Pacino and the supporting cast.

=== Later reviews ===
Rotten Tomatoes rated it 93% "Fresh", with an average score of 8.4/10, based on reviews from 55 critics. The consensus reads: "An engrossing, immediate depiction of early '70s New York, Serpico is elevated by Al Pacino's ferocious performance." On the review aggregator Metacritic, the movie garnered a score of 83 out of 100, based on 16 reviews from mainstream critics. The result indicated "universal acclaim".

AllMovie gave Serpico five stars out of five. The review described the situation in the United States following the Watergate scandal, and how the "bureaucratic depravity touched a cultural nerve". It welcomed the film's "documentary-style realism".

The A.V. Club received it positively; the reviewer felt that Serpico expressed "artful, character-driven slices of life".

In its later review, The Village Voice declared that the "Watergate-era time capsule of hippie fashions" that the film presented "ought to look pretty dated", but that the story "feels depressingly relevant".

A 2023 article found that "the movie, like the life of its hero, remains a clear public good". The article commented that a film about a cop facing impossible, potentially fatal, obstacles for simply doing his job on the level "feels impossible in the Hollywood of today".

== Legacy ==
On September 21, 1975, Serpico premiered on television on The ABC Sunday Night Movie.

It was released on VHS in 1991, and on DVD in 2002. The film was made available on Blu-ray in 2013. Masters of Cinema released Serpico in the United Kingdom on Blu-ray in 2014. It contains three video documentaries about the film, a photo gallery with an audio commentary by Lumet, and a forty-four page booklet.

A television series based on Maas's book and the motion picture was broadcast on NBC between September 1976 and January 1977, with David Birney as Serpico. Fourteen episodes were broadcast, but the fifteenth was not aired. The series was preceded by the pilot film Serpico: The Deadly Game, which was broadcast in April 1976.

The main character in the 1976 Italian film The Cop in Blue Jeans was inspired by Serpico. In the 1977 film Saturday Night Fever, a poster of Serpico is featured in the room of its main character, Tony Manero. The film is referenced in 1994's Natural Born Killers by the character Dwight McClusky. The poster of the film is featured in the room of the main character of 1997's Boogie Nights. Serpico was mentioned in the 1995 film Get Shorty.

In a 2004 Corner Gas episode "The Taxman", local cops Davis and Karen talk about the film, and Karen tries to rent it at the video store. In the 2007 episode of It's Always Sunny in Philadelphia "Bums: Making a Mess All Over the City", Charlie imitates Pacino's performance after the gang buys an out-of-commission police car. The film is referenced in a 2016 episode of El ministerio del tiempo as the reason for the nickname of one of its main characters, "Pacino". Among other police films, Serpico influenced the Hong Kong action cinema.

== Accolades ==
The film received Academy Awards nominations for Best Actor (Al Pacino) and Best Adapted Screenplay. The script won the Writers Guild of America Award for Best Adapted Screenplay. Theodorakis was nominated for both the Grammy Award for Best Score Soundtrack for Visual Media and the BAFTA Award for Best Film Music. Sidney Lumet was nominated for the BAFTA Award for Best Direction and the Directors Guild of America Award. The film was nominated for the Golden Globe Award for Best Motion Picture – Drama. Pacino won his first Golden Globe award for Best Actor in 1974. For his performance, he also received a BAFTA nomination for Best Actor in a Leading Role.

Pacino's role as Frank Serpico ranks at number forty on the American Film Institute's AFI's 100 Years...100 Heroes & Villains. Meanwhile, Serpico also ranks at number eighty-four on AFI's AFI's 100 Years...100 Cheers, a list of America's most inspiring films.

Award	Category	Nominee	Result	Ref.
46th Academy Awards	Best Actor	Al Pacino	Nominated	
46th Academy Awards	Best Adapted Screenplay	Waldo Salt and Norman Wexler	Nominated	
28th British Academy Film Awards	Best Direction	Sidney Lumet	Nominated	
28th British Academy Film Awards	Best Actor in a Leading Role	Al Pacino	Nominated	
28th British Academy Film Awards	Best Original Music	Mikis Theodorakis	Nominated	
31st Golden Globe Awards	Best Motion Picture – Drama	Serpico	Nominated	
31st Golden Globe Awards	Best Actor – Motion Picture Drama	Al Pacino	Won	
26th Directors Guild of America Awards	Outstanding Directing – Feature Film	Sidney Lumet	Nominated	
26th Writers Guild of America Awards	Best Adapted Screenplay	Waldo Salt and Norman Wexler	Won	
17th Annual Grammy Awards	Best Score Soundtrack for Visual Media	Mikis Theodorakis	Nominated	
