= Social media in the 2012 United States presidential election =

The use of social media in political campaigning was made popular by Barack Obama in the 2008 presidential elections and the impact of social media in deciding the 2008 presidential elections was evident in the research and analysis produced. The 2008 elections and 2012 elections exist in different landscapes, during the 2008 elections Obama's campaign was considered "an experimental innovator" but by 2012 the merits of social media had been repeatedly proven.

The period of time leading up to, during and after elections consisted of news feeds filled with candidate advertisements, news surrounding the candidates or articles informing on the policy of the candidates. This meant that people were in constant connection to the happenings of the political landscape in the US, research done by Pew Research Centre shows that the overall use of social media to convince others to vote or promote themselves as having voted increased drastically from 2008 to 2012.

Candidates would often make use of multiple social media accounts such as YouTube, Facebook, Twitter and Tumblr. Depending on the digital architecture of each platform candidates would post, re-share articles to further their campaign and halter opposing candidates in their run for front office, this was done by fact checking, discrediting and responding to their respective posts, all this in constant view of the public. This unique relationship with the public, helped candidates influences the portrayal of themselves in the news and in their own accounts. These social media accounts helped candidates create their own electoral coalitions, which identify voters and in turn raise money. Social media has made it easier for candidates to mobilise voters and boost their electoral impact.

== Background ==
Social media has required a reconstruction in the way political campaigns are run. Statistics from social media use has shed light on its effectiveness as an instrument to campaign politically. At the exit polls on election day (6 November) 69% of the people who voted reportedly used social media to promote the fact that they voted at the 2012 presidential campaign. This statistic means a lot more when looking back at the percentage of adults that utilised social media in the 2008 US presidential election which was 37%. Facebook has its own method of promoting the election campaign by giving its users a method to share the fact that they voted on other people's newsfeeds, this feature was used by a large number voters. The researchers at Pew research center reported that out of all the registered voters a percentage of 55% have utilised the Internet to watch videos related to the election. 22% of registered voters have used Facebook and Twitter and other social media platforms to let their family and friends know how they voted. There is also a difference seen in the voting tendencies of liberals vs. conservatives and in the way they utilised social media; 79% of liberals report using social media while on the other hand 60% of conservatives admitted to using social media. On the other hand, the percentage of liberals using Twitter is 25% with 10% moderate for those voters that frequent the social media site sharing their thoughts.

== Main campaigns during the 2012 elections ==
=== Barack Obama's campaign ===
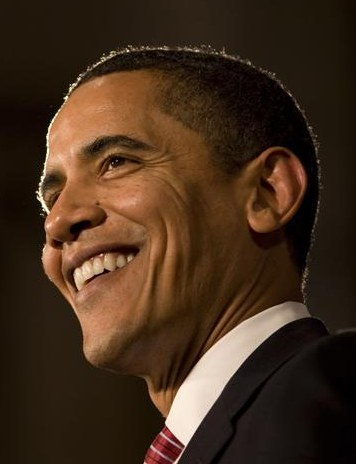
President Barack Obama photographed at the first presidential debate on the 3rd of October.

Barack Obama has a history of successfully using social media, breaking several records with his posts on Facebook and tweets on Twitter. Leading up to the 2008 elections Barack Obama was the first pioneer in choosing to rely on social media to build his campaign, Obama built his own social networking site called my.barackobama.com or MyBO for short and hired the help of Chris Hughes who is also co founded Facebook, with his help Obama developed his platform and planned his social networking strategy.

Similarly going into the 2012 presidential elections Obama hired organisations to keep an eye on the inflow and outflow of data on their social networking sites and pages. These organisations analysed a person's Internet activity and strategically delivered campaign promotions that appealed to that individual's online portfolio.

=== Mitt Romney's campaign ===
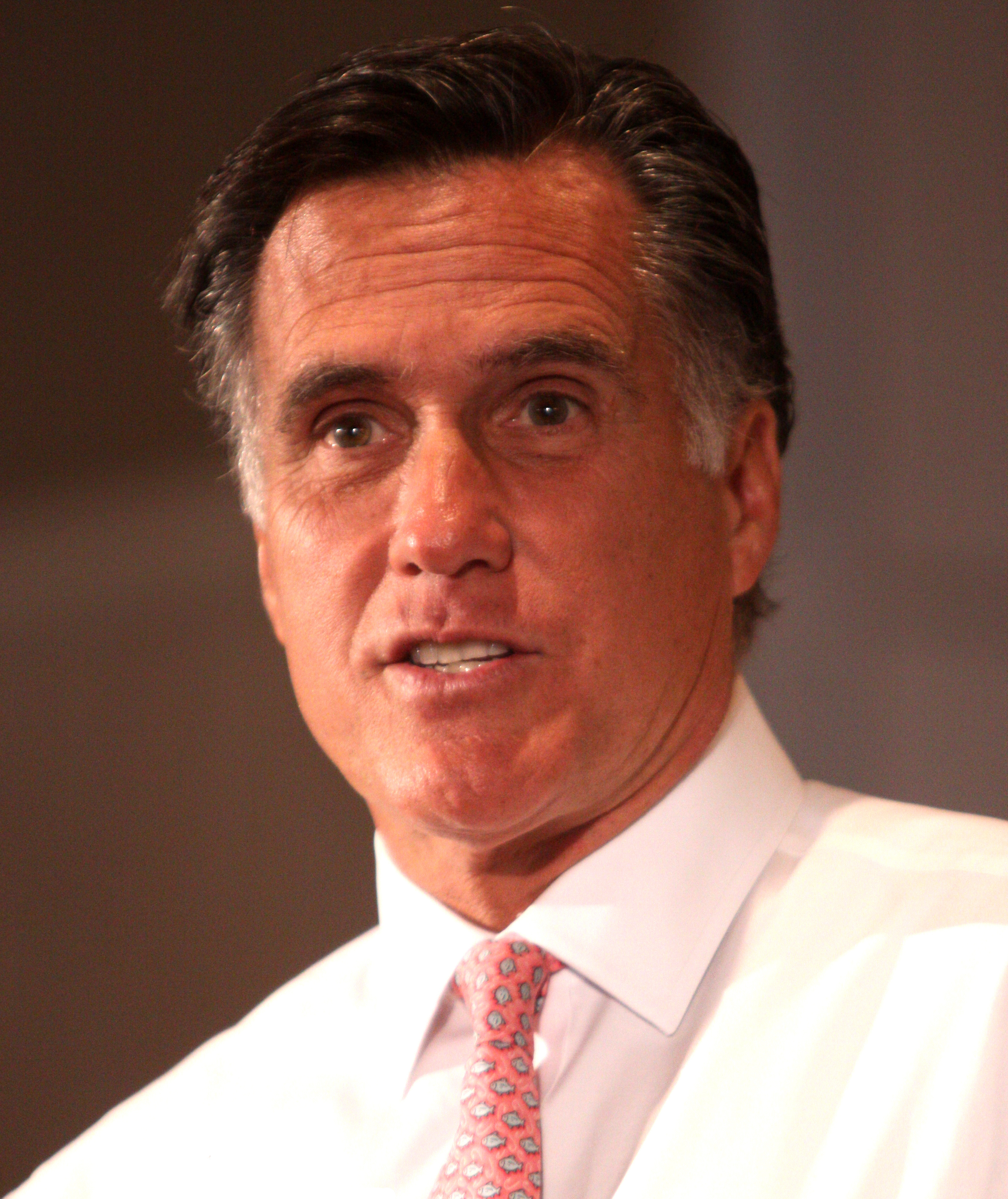
Republican presidential candidate, Mitt Romney addresses members of the National Guard Association of the United States at this year's annual convention held in Reno, Nevada.

Romney leading up to the elections put his campaign team forward to close the digital gap between Obama and him, reports from Pew Research Center show that Obama leads Romney in digital activity on the eve of the conventions for the 2012 campaigns. The number one issue that was the topic of discussion was the troubled economy as reported by several media outlets. Romney's campaign focused on jobs, with 24% of the content on his social media being about the economy. Romney's website contained a page summarising accounts of news media stories about candidates, although only those showing Romney in a positive light and Obama in a negative manner.

Mitt Romney was at the brunt of many online 'memes' that frequented social media. One such in incident was when the popular YouTube channel 'Bad Lip Reading' created a video that poked fun at the fact that 'Romney' was a homophone for a verb that meant 'defecating in terror' and the aforementioned 'binders of woman' phrase that Romney used in response to a question at the presidential debate. Another instance that made Romney the butt of all jokes during the election was the 'Little Face Mitt' which was created by Wisconsin humorist Reuben Glaser, Romney's facial features were shrunken in a comedic manner and centred in the outline of his face, in a short period of time this meme was all over everyones social media feeds and also was popularised by media websites like; CollegeHumor, Tumblr and BuzzFeed.

== Social Media use in comparison ==
=== Difference in strategy ===
President Obama and Mitt Romney utilised unique strategies when approaching their online campaigns, social media had an important role in the 2012 US presidential elections, this can be seen in the difference in the way these platforms to capture the attention of these voters, for example Mitt Romney felt the repercussions of his actions after he utilised the social media site Twitter to share his feelings about the percentage of Americans who don't pay income taxes (47%), as well as his "binders full of women", these tweets didn't fare well with the online community. Which was seen in the way they reacted in the form of tweets, comments and posts on their respective social media profiles. Other than political views candidates also used social media to build a relationship with the US population.

Throughout the campaign, candidates debated over topics like enhancing the economy, social security, taxes, federal deficit, immigration, healthcare and Medicaid the list is endless. In the hopes to increase familiarity and become more relatable candidates posted pictures of their family, trivial things around them, fans from their campaign stops and snapshots from their daily lives. Overall, these and many other events on social media contributed to the outcome of the 2012 election.

The Obama campaign in terms of successful use of social media in boosting campaign success was better than Romney's efforts. On all sites Facebook, Twitter, Pinterest and YouTube, the views, follows, likes and pins Obama was getting was hugely different to Romney's statistics. Obama having 21, 254, 754 million followers on Twitter in comparison to Romney's 1,559,035 million followers in October of the election year should have been a sign for Mitt Romney's campaign team. In terms of campaign output on social media Obama had a huge advantage against Romney, research carried out by Pew Research Center indicate.

=== Facebook and Twitter ===
Mitt Romney's campaign team lead Obama in posts on Facebook but Obama's posts had a higher number of responses than Romney's posts, during the buildup towards the election, Obama's social media campaign team created 614 posts on social media sites versus Romney's campaign team published only 168 posts. The biggest difference in success on social media was seen on Twitter, for example, Romney's campaign team had 1 tweet per day while Obama's campaign team published 29 tweets, 17 on @BarackObama the account focused on his presidency and 12 on his campaign account. On Twitter 3% of Obama's 490 tweets were retweets whereas Romney only retweeted a single tweet that was created by his son. Social media coverage was reported to favour Obama over Romney by Pew Research Center. Their study looked at how many statements of belief were made about Obama and Romney respectively during two national conventions (Republican and Democratic) and whether these posts about each candidate had a positive or negative tone. There were 11,179,537 tweets about Obama versus 7,740,992 tweets about Romney, similarly in terms of Facebook posts there were 442,524 about Obama and 249,567 about Romney. Pew Research Centre found that on Twitter, 17% of overall tweets were considered having a positive tone whereas 59% were negative. On the other hand, tweets about Obama were found to be 25% positive and 44% negative.

=== Tumblr and candidate websites ===
Obama's presence on social media sites were not limited to just Facebook and Twitter but also targeted blog sites that were known to be frequented by teenagers like Pinterest and Tumblr. According to a page on Union Metrics, Obama's Tumblr had five times the user engagement a period of time than Romney did, through the use of animated GIFs, pop culture references and clever images of Obama were used to attract the attention of 319,000 Tumblr users, receiving 555,700 notes in the month of October alone with 191 posts. Romney's presence on Tumblr was smaller in comparison to Obama, in October his team posted 33 times and received 17,800 notes from 15,800 Tumblr users; people reblogged his posts a total of 339 times per post and each post received 199 likes per post.

Romney's Tumblr posts were mainly large pictures with slogans on them like 'No we can't'. One of Obama's notable posts on Tumblr was a post aimed at reminding the United States population about the first presidential debate, Obama's social media team utilised a GIF from Mean Girls that had the text 'It's October 3', this post alone has 69,000 notes to this day. Obama's Tumblr page consisted of historical photos that outlined significant dates in the history of the United States Of America, pictures of Obama at his desk sending out tweets on his computer also commonly appeared on the page. The layout of the page was highly customisable, with eye catching colours and a bold header to make sure people knew whose page it was. Romney's campaign team had opted for using the basic html format which limited how customisable the website was, his site was plain white with a small image and a caption decorating it.

The two candidate websites also differed in terms of functionality, Obama's candidate website allowed visitors to select the constituency group they felt they belonged to, with 18 different options that include, veterans, African Americans, LGBT, Latinos etc. This allowed Obama's campaign team to deliver content particular to the specific constituency group. Romney's candidate website did not have the same option in June, but in a couple months his team introduced nine different options for visitors to segregate themselves into.
