= 2012 United States presidential election =

Re-election of Barack Obama

- November 6, 2012

538 members of the Electoral College 270 electoral votes needed to win
- Opinion polls
- Turnout: 58.6% (▼3.0 pp)

Nominee	Barack Obama	Mitt Romney
Party	Democratic	Republican
Home state	Illinois	Massachusetts
Running mate	Joe Biden	Paul Ryan
Electoral vote	332	206
States carried	26 + DC	24
Popular vote	65,915,795	60,933,504
Percentage	51.1%	47.2%
- Presidential election results map. Blue denotes states won by Obama/Biden and red denotes those won by Romney/Ryan. Numbers indicate electoral votes cast by each state and the District of Columbia.
President before election
Barack Obama
Democratic
Elected President
Barack Obama
Democratic

A presidential election was held in the United States on November 6, 2012. Incumbent Democratic president Barack Obama and his running mate, incumbent vice president Joe Biden, were re-elected to a second term; they defeated the Republican ticket of former Massachusetts governor Mitt Romney and Wisconsin Congressman Paul Ryan.

Obama and Biden were re-nominated by their party without strong opposition in the way. Meanwhile, the Republican Party experienced a competitive primary, with Romney consistently competitive in the polls and winning the support of many party leaders, but facing challenges from a number of more conservative contenders. Romney secured his party's nomination in May, defeating former senator Rick Santorum, former speaker of the House and Georgia congressman Newt Gingrich, and Texas Congressman Ron Paul, among other candidates.

The campaigns focused heavily on domestic issues, and debate centered largely around sound responses to the Great Recession along with long-term federal budget issues, the future of social insurance programs, and the Affordable Care Act. Foreign policy was also discussed, including the end of the Iraq War in 2011, military spending, the Iranian nuclear program, and appropriate counteractions to terrorism. Romney claimed Obama's domestic policies were ineffective and financially insolvent while Obama's campaign sought to characterize Romney as a plutocratic businessman who was out of touch with the average American. The campaign was marked by a sharp rise in fundraising, including from nominally independent Super PACs.

Obama defeated Romney, winning 332 Electoral College votes and 51.1% of the popular vote to Romney's 206 electoral votes and 47.2% of the popular vote. He became the third sitting president in a row (after Bill Clinton and George W. Bush) to win a second consecutive term. Obama carried all 18 "blue wall" states and defeated Romney in crucial swing states that Republicans had previously won in 2000 and 2004, namely Colorado, Florida, Nevada, Ohio, and Virginia. Despite his loss, Romney managed to flip Indiana, North Carolina, and Nebraska's 2nd congressional district from the 2008 election. Ultimately, Obama won eight of the nine main swing states, losing only North Carolina. This is the most recent presidential election in which the incumbent party won. As of 2024, this was the most recent election in which the Democratic nominee won Florida, Iowa, Ohio, and Maine's 2nd congressional district.

== Background ==
=== State changes to voter registration and electoral rules ===
In 2011, several state legislatures passed new voting laws, especially pertaining to voter identification, with the stated purpose of combating voter fraud; however, the laws were attacked by the Democratic Party as attempts to suppress voting among its supporters and to improve the Republican Party's presidential prospects. Florida, Georgia, Ohio, Tennessee, and West Virginia's state legislatures approved measures to shorten early voting periods. Florida and Iowa barred all felons from voting. Kansas, South Carolina, Tennessee, Texas, and Wisconsin state legislatures passed laws requiring voters to have government-issued IDs before they could cast their ballots. This meant typically that people without driver's licenses or passports had to gain new forms of ID. Former president Bill Clinton denounced them as resembling a return of the type of disenfranchisement seen at the turn of the 20th century, saying, "There has never been in my lifetime, since we got rid of the poll tax and all the Jim Crow burdens on voting, the determined effort to limit the franchise that we see today". Clinton said the moves would effectively disenfranchise core voter blocs that trend liberal, including college students, black people, and Latinos.

The Obama campaign fought against the Ohio law, pushing for a petition and statewide referendum to repeal it in time for the 2012 election. In addition, the Pennsylvania legislature proposed a plan to change its representation in the electoral college from the traditional winner-take-all model to a district-by-district model. As the governorship and both houses of its legislature were Republican-controlled, the move was viewed by some as an attempt to reduce Democratic chances. Ultimately, they did not do it, leaving their winner take all format intact as of 2020.

== Nominations ==
=== Democratic Party ===
==== Candidate ====
Democratic Party (United States) 2012 Democratic Party ticket
Barack Obama	Joe Biden
for President	for Vice President
44th President of the United States (2009–2017)	47th Vice President of the United States (2009–2017)
Campaign

==== Primaries ====
With an incumbent president running for re-election against token opposition, the race for the Democratic nomination was largely uneventful. The nomination process consisted of primaries and caucuses, held by the 50 states, as well as Guam, Puerto Rico, Washington, D.C., U.S. Virgin Islands, American Samoa, and Democrats Abroad. Additionally, high-ranking party members known as superdelegates each received one vote in the convention. A few of the primary challengers surpassed the president's vote total in individual counties in several of the seven contested primaries, though none made a significant impact in the delegate count. Running unopposed everywhere else, Obama cemented his status as the Democratic presumptive nominee on April 3, 2012, by securing the minimum number of pledged delegates needed to obtain the nomination.

=== Republican Party ===
==== Candidate ====
Republican Party (United States) 2012 Republican Party ticket
Mitt Romney	Paul Ryan
for President	for Vice President
70th Governor of Massachusetts (2003–2007)	U.S. Representative from Wisconsin (1999–2019)
Campaign

==== Withdrawn candidates ====
Candidates in this section are sorted by popular vote from the primaries
Rick Santorum	Newt Gingrich	Ron Paul	Jon Huntsman Jr.	Rick Perry	Michele Bachmann
U.S. Senator from Pennsylvania (1995–2007)	50th Speaker of the United States; House of Representatives (1995–1999)	U.S. Representative from Texas (1997–2013)	U.S. Ambassador to China (2009–2011)	47th Governor of Texas (2000–2015)	U.S. Representative from Minnesota (2007–2013)
Campaign	Campaign	Campaign	Campaign	Campaign	Campaign
W: April 10; 3,816,110 votes	W: May 2; 2,737,442 votes	W: N/A; 2,017,957 votes	W: Jan 16; 83,173 votes	W: Jan 19; 42,251 votes	W: Jan 4; 35,089 votes
Buddy Roemer	Herman Cain	Fred Karger	Gary Johnson	Thaddeus McCotter	Tim Pawlenty
52nd Governor of Louisiana (1988–1992)	Chair of the Federal Reserve; Bank of Kansas City (1995–1996)	Political; Consultant	29th Governor of New Mexico (1995–2003)	U.S. Representative from Michigan (2003–2012)	39th Governor of Minnesota (2003–2011)
Campaign	Campaign	Campaign	Campaign	Campaign	Campaign
W: Feb 22; 33,212 votes	W: Dec 3, 2011; 13,538 votes	W: June 29, 2012; 12,776 votes	W: Dec 28, 2011; 4,286 votes	W: Sep 22, 2011; 0 votes	W: Aug 14, 2011; 0 votes

==== Primaries ====
Candidates with considerable name recognition who entered the race for the Republican presidential nomination in the early stages of the primary campaign included U.S. representative and former Libertarian nominee Ron Paul, former Minnesota governor Tim Pawlenty, who co-chaired John McCain's campaign in 2008, former Massachusetts governor Mitt Romney, the runner-up for the nomination in the 2008 cycle, and former Speaker of the House Newt Gingrich.

The first debate took place on May 5, 2011, in Greenville, South Carolina, with businessman Herman Cain, former New Mexico governor Gary Johnson, Ron Paul, Tim Pawlenty, and former Pennsylvania senator Rick Santorum participating. Another debate took place a month later, with Newt Gingrich, Mitt Romney, former Utah governor Jon Huntsman, and Minnesota congresswoman Michele Bachmann participating, and Gary Johnson excluded. A total of thirteen debates were held before the Iowa caucuses.

The first major event of the campaign was the Ames Straw Poll, which took place in Iowa on August 13, 2011. Michele Bachmann won the straw poll (this ultimately proved to be the acme of her campaign). Pawlenty withdrew from the race after a poor showing in the straw poll, as did Thaddeus McCotter, the only candidate among those who qualified for the ballot who was refused entrance into the debate.

It became clear at around this point in the nomination process that while Romney was considered to be the likely nominee by the Republican establishment, a large segment of the conservative primary electorate found him to be too moderate for their political views. As a result, a number of potential "anti-Romney" candidates were put forward, including future president Donald Trump, former Alaska governor and 2008 vice-presidential nominee Sarah Palin, New Jersey governor Chris Christie, and Texas governor Rick Perry, the last of whom decided to run in August 2011. Perry did poorly in the debates, however, and Herman Cain and then Newt Gingrich came to the fore in October and November.

Due to a number of scandals, Cain withdrew just before the end of the year, after having ballot placement in several states. Around the same time, Johnson, who had been able to get into only one other debate, withdrew to seek the Libertarian Party nomination.

For the first time in modern Republican Party history, three different candidates won the first three state contests in January (the Iowa caucuses, the New Hampshire primary, and the South Carolina primary). Although Romney had been expected to win in at least Iowa and New Hampshire, Rick Santorum won the non-binding poll at caucus sites in Iowa by 34 votes, as near as could be determined from the incomplete tally, earning him a declaration as winner by state party leaders, although vote totals were missing from eight precincts. The election of county delegates at the caucuses eventually led to Ron Paul earning 22 of the 28 Iowa delegates to the Republican National Convention. Newt Gingrich won South Carolina by a surprisingly large margin, and Romney won only in New Hampshire.

A number of candidates dropped out at this point in the nomination process. Bachmann withdrew after finishing sixth in the Iowa caucuses, Huntsman withdrew after coming in third in New Hampshire, and Perry withdrew when polls showed him drawing low numbers in South Carolina.

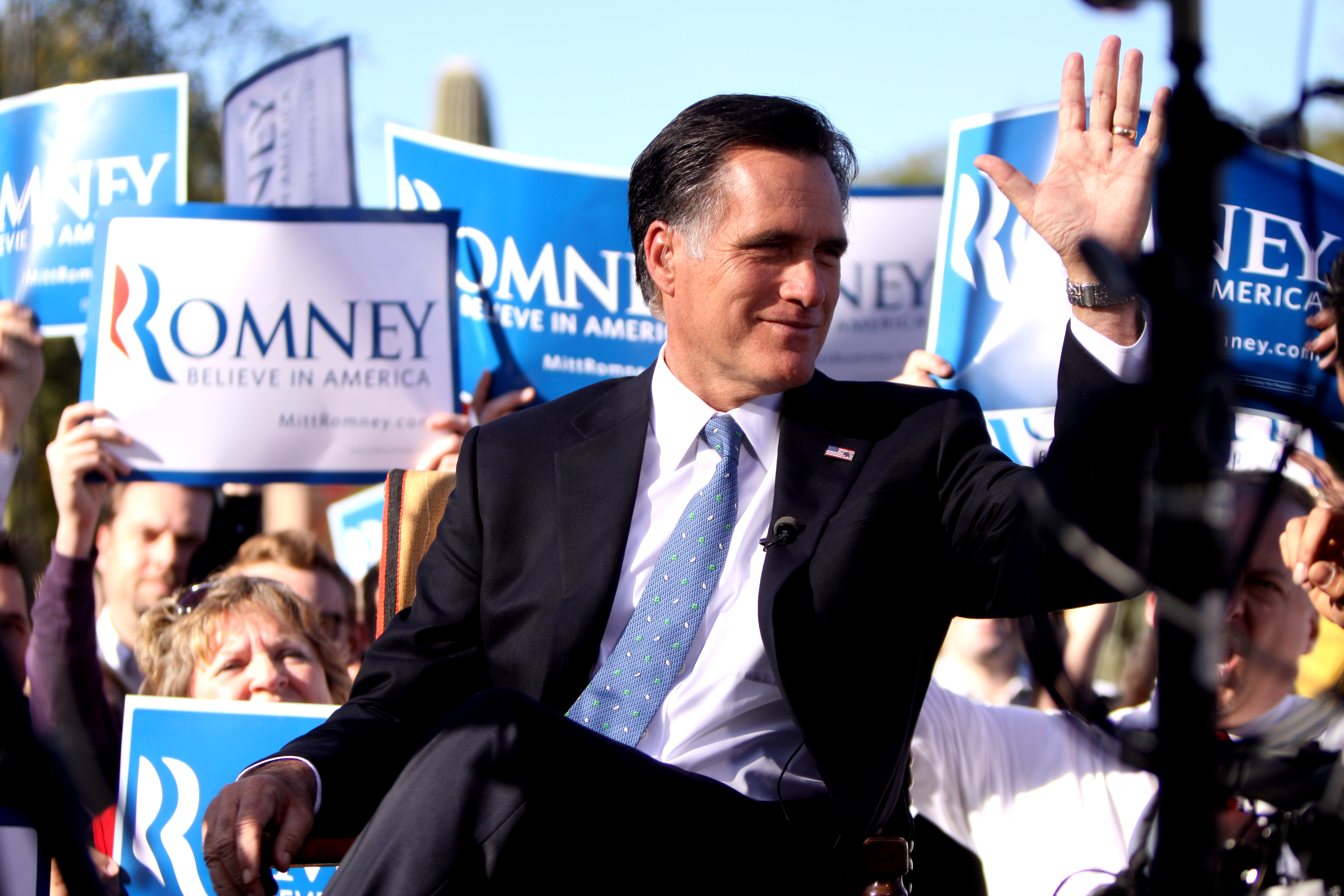
Mitt Romney on the campaign trail

Santorum, who had previously run an essentially one-state campaign in Iowa, was able to organize a national campaign after his surprising victory there. He unexpectedly carried three states in a row on February 7 and overtook Romney in nationwide opinion polls, becoming the only candidate in the race to effectively challenge the notion that Romney was the inevitable nominee. However, Romney won all of the other contests between South Carolina and the Super Tuesday primaries, and regained his first-place status in nationwide opinion polls by the end of February.

The Super Tuesday primaries took place on March 6. Romney carried six states, Santorum carried three, and Gingrich won only in his home state of Georgia. Throughout the rest of March, 266 delegates were allocated in 12 events, including the territorial contests and the first local conventions that allocated delegates (Wyoming's county conventions). Santorum won Kansas and three Southern primaries, but he was unable to make any substantial gain on Romney, who became a formidable frontrunner after securing more than half of the delegates allocated in March.

On April 10, Santorum suspended his campaign due to a variety of reasons, such as a low delegate count, unfavorable polls in his home state of Pennsylvania, and his daughter's health, leaving Mitt Romney as the undisputed front-runner for the presidential nomination and allowing Gingrich to claim that he was "the last conservative standing" in the campaign for the nomination. After disappointing results in the April 24 primaries (finishing second in one state, third in three, and fourth in one), Gingrich dropped out on May 2 in a move that was seen as an effective end to the contest for the nomination. After Gingrich's spokesman announced his upcoming withdrawal, the Republican National Committee declared Romney the party's presumptive nominee. Ron Paul officially remained in the race, but he stopped campaigning on May 14 to focus on state conventions.

On May 29, after winning the Texas primary, Romney had received a sufficient number of delegates to clinch the party's nomination with the inclusion of unpledged delegates. After winning the June 5 primaries in California and several other states, Romney had received more than enough pledged delegates to clinch the nomination without counting unpledged delegates, making the June 26 Utah Primary, the last contest of the cycle, purely symbolic. CNN's final delegate estimate, released on July 27, 2012, put Romney at 1,462 pledged delegates and 62 unpledged delegates, for a total estimate of 1,524 delegates. No other candidate had unpledged delegates. The delegate estimates for the other candidates were Santorum at 261 delegates, Paul at 154, Gingrich at 142, Bachmann at 1, Huntsman at 1, and all others at 0.

On August 28, 2012, delegates at the Republican National Convention officially named Romney the party's presidential nominee. Romney formally accepted the delegates' nomination on August 30, 2012.

=== Third party and other nominations ===
Four other parties nominated candidates that had ballot access or write-in access to at least 270 electoral votes, the minimum number of votes needed in the 2012 election to win the presidency through a majority of the electoral college.

==== Libertarian Party ====
2012 Libertarian Party ticket
Gary Johnson	Jim Gray
for President	for Vice President
29th governor of New Mexico (1995–2003)	Jurist and writer from California

Gary Johnson, former governor of New Mexico. Vice-presidential nominee: Jim Gray, retired state court judge, from California.

==== Green Party ====
2012 Green Party ticket
Jill Stein	Cheri Honkala
for President	for Vice President
Physician from Lexington, Massachusetts	social organizer from Pennsylvania

Jill Stein, medical doctor from Massachusetts, made her first run for president in 2012, with Vice-presidential nominee Cheri Honkala, social organizer, from Pennsylvania.

==== Constitution Party ====
- Virgil Goode, former representative from Virginia. Vice-presidential nominee: Jim Clymer from Pennsylvania.

==== Justice Party ====
- Rocky Anderson, former mayor of Salt Lake City and founding member of the Justice Party, from Utah. Vice-presidential nominee: Luis J. Rodriguez from California.

== Campaigns ==
=== Ballot access ===
Presidential ticket	Party	Ballot access			Votes	Percentage
Presidential ticket	Party	States	Electors	% of voters	Votes	Percentage
**Obama / Biden**	**Democratic**	**50 + DC**	**538**	**100%**	**65,915,795**	**51.1%**
**Romney / Ryan**	**Republican**	**50 + DC**	**538**	**100%**	**60,933,504**	**47.2%**
**Johnson / Gray**	**Libertarian**	**48 + DC**	**515**	**95.1%**	**1,275,971**	**1.0%**
**Stein / Honkala**	**Green**	**36 + DC**	**436**	**83.1%**	**469,627**	**0.4%**
Goode / Clymer	Constitution	26	257	49.9%	122,388	0.1%
Anderson / Rodriguez	Justice	15	145	28.1%	43,018	nil
Lindsay / Osorio	Socialism & Liberation	13	115	28.6%	7,791	nil

Candidates in bold were on ballots representing 270 electoral votes.

All other candidates were on the ballots of fewer than 10 states, 100 electors, and less than 20% of voters nationwide.

=== Financing and advertising ===
The United States presidential election of 2012 broke new records in financing, fundraising, and negative campaigning. Through grassroots campaign contributions, online donations, and Super PACs, Obama and Romney raised a combined total of more than $2 billion. Super PACs constituted nearly one-fourth of the total financing, with most coming from pro-Romney PACs. Obama raised $690 million through online channels, beating his record of $500 million in 2008. Most of the advertising in the 2012 presidential campaign was decidedly negative—80% of Obama's ads and 84% of Romney's ads were negative. The tax-exempt non-profit Americans for Prosperity, a so-called "outside group", that is, a political advocacy group that is not a political action committee or super-PAC, ran a television advertising campaign opposing Obama described by The Washington Post as "early and relentless". Americans for Prosperity spent $8.4 million in swing states on television advertisements denouncing the American Recovery and Reinvestment Act of 2009 loan guarantee to Solyndra, a manufacturer of solar panels that went bankrupt, an advertising campaign described by The Wall Street Journal in November 2011 as "perhaps the biggest attack on Mr. Obama so far".

=== Party conventions ===
Sites of the 2012 national party conventions
- April 18–21, 2012: 2012 Constitution Party National Convention held in Nashville, Tennessee; Virgil Goode won the nomination.
- May 3–6, 2012: 2012 Libertarian National Convention held in Las Vegas, Nevada; Gary Johnson won the nomination.
- July 13–15, 2012: 2012 Green National Convention held in Baltimore, Maryland; Jill Stein won the nomination.
- August 27–30, 2012: 2012 Republican National Convention held in Tampa, Florida; Mitt Romney won the nomination.
- September 3–6, 2012: 2012 Democratic National Convention held in Charlotte, North Carolina; Barack Obama won the nomination.

=== Presidential debates ===
The Commission on Presidential Debates held four debates during the last weeks of the campaign: three presidential and one vice-presidential. The major issues debated were the economy and jobs, the federal budget deficit, taxation and spending, the future of Social Security, Medicare, and Medicaid, healthcare reform, education, social issues, immigration, and foreign policy.

Debate schedule:

Debates among candidates for the 2012 U.S. presidential election
No.	Date	Host	City	Moderator	Participants	Viewership (million)
P1	Wednesday, October 3, 2012	University of Denver	Denver, Colorado	Jim Lehrer	Barack Obama; Mitt Romney	67.2
VP	Thursday, October 11, 2012	Centre College	Danville, Kentucky	Martha Raddatz	Joe Biden; Paul Ryan	51.4
P2	Tuesday, October 16, 2012	Hofstra University	Hempstead, New York	Candy Crowley	Barack Obama; Mitt Romney	65.6
P3	Monday, October 22, 2012	Lynn University	Boca Raton, Florida	Bob Schieffer	Barack Obama; Mitt Romney	59.2

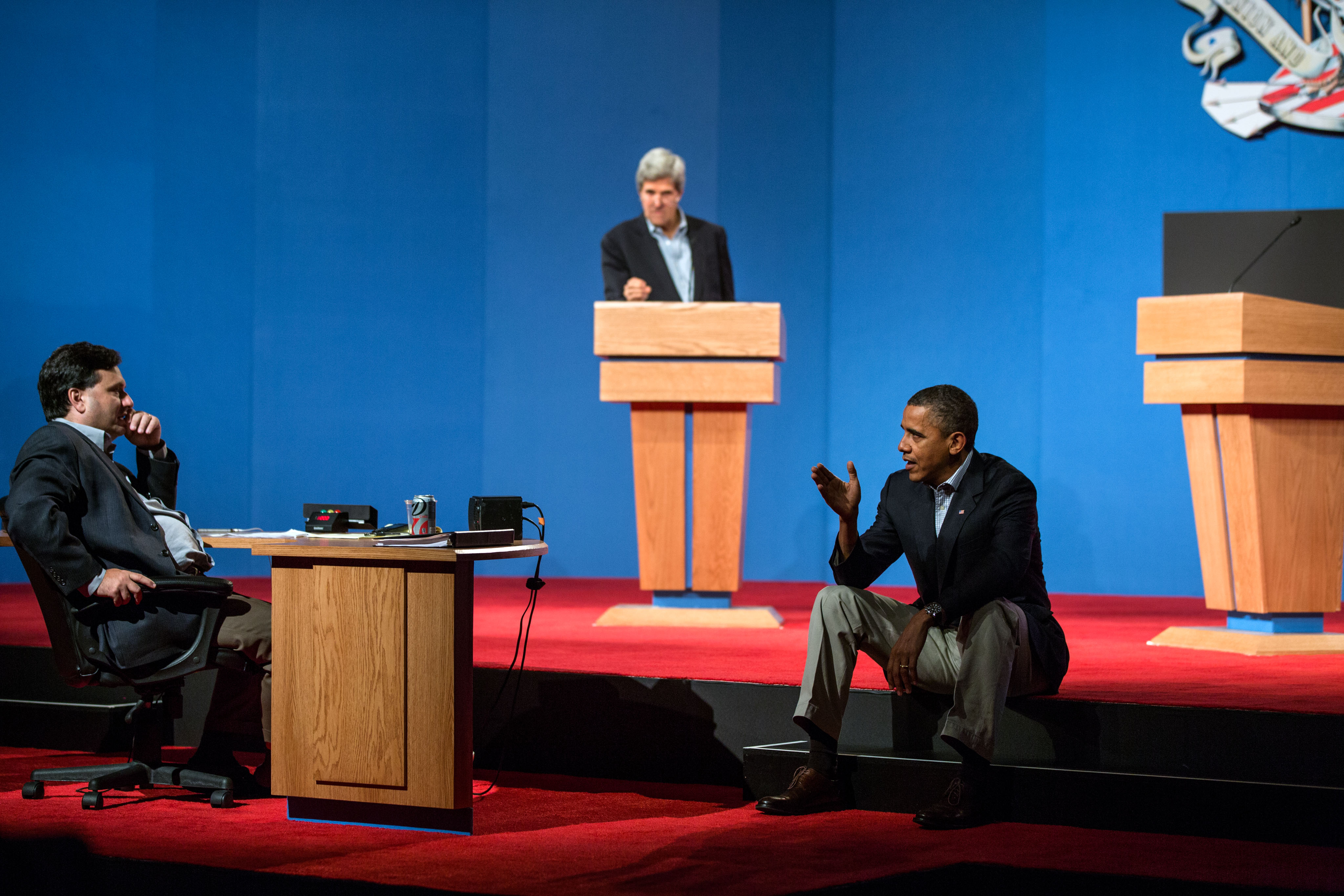
President Obama talks with Ron Klain during presidential debate preparations. Senator John Kerry, at podium, played the role of Mitt Romney during the preparatory sessions.

An independent presidential debate featuring minor party candidates took place on Tuesday, October 23 at the Hilton Hotel in Chicago, Illinois. The debate was moderated by Larry King and organized by the Free & Equal Elections Foundation. The participants were Gary Johnson (Libertarian), Jill Stein (Green), Virgil Goode (Constitution), and Rocky Anderson (Justice). A second debate between Stein and Johnson took place on Sunday, November 4, and was moderated by Ralph Nader.

=== Notable expressions, phrases, and statements ===
- **Severely conservative** – In a speech he made at the Conservative Political Action Conference in February 2012, Romney claimed that he had been a "severely conservative Republican governor". Romney's description of his record as "severely conservative" was widely criticized by political commentators as both rhetorically clumsy and factually inaccurate. Later, the phrase "severely conservative" was frequently brought up by Democrats to make fun of Romney's willingness to associate himself with the far-right of the Republican Party as well as his apparent lack of sincerity while doing so. Conservative radio host Rush Limbaugh, who played the clip on his radio show, said: "I have never heard anybody say, 'I'm severely conservative.' "
- **You didn't build that** – A portion of a statement that Obama made in a July 2012 campaign speech in Roanoke, Virginia. Obama said that businesses depend on government-provided infrastructure to succeed, but critics of his remarks argued that he was underplaying the work of entrepreneurs and giving the government credit for individuals' success. The Romney campaign immediately used the statement in an effort to contrast Romney's economic policies with Obama's and to appeal to small business owners/employees. A major theme of the 2012 Republican National Convention was "We Built It".
- **47 percent** – An expression Romney used at a private campaign fundraising event, which was secretly recorded and publicly released. At the private event, Romney said that 47 percent of the people would vote for Barack Obama no matter what Romney said or did because those people "...are dependent upon government... I'll never convince them they should take personal responsibility and care for their lives."
- **The 1980s are now calling to ask for their foreign policy back** – A portion of a statement that Obama made in an October 2012 debate. In the debate, Obama was deriding an earlier Romney statement in the campaign that Russia is "without question, our No. 1 geopolitical foe."
- **Binders full of women** – A phrase that Romney used in the second presidential debate to refer to the long list of female candidates that he considered when choosing his cabinet members as Governor of Massachusetts.
- **Horses and bayonets** – After Romney said in the third presidential debate that the U.S. Navy was smaller than at any time since 1917, Obama replied, "We have fewer ships than we did in 1916. Well, governor, we also have fewer horses and bayonets, because the nature of our military's changed."
- **Shovel-ready** jobs – a phrase used to describe some stimulus projects promoted by the administration. During the debate on September 23, 2011, Gary Johnson quipped, "My next-door neighbor's two dogs have created more shovel-ready jobs than this president."
- **Romnesia** – A term coined by a blogger in April 2011 and used by Obama late in the campaign to describe Romney's alleged inability to take responsibility for his past statements.
- **$10,000 bet** – During a Republican debate, Romney facetiously bet Texas governor Rick Perry $10,000 that he (Perry) was wrong about Romney's position on the individual mandate under the Affordable Healthcare Act. The statement was vilified by Democrats as exemplary of Romney being out of touch with working-class and middle-class Americans.
- **Romneyshambles** – a word used by the British press after Romney criticized British preparations for the 2012 Summer Olympics. The word is a play on omnishambles, and it became a popular hashtag on Twitter. It was subsequently chosen as one of Collins English Dictionary's words of the year.
- **Malarkey** – a word used by Joe Biden in his debate with Paul Ryan to mean bullshit. Biden later used the word in his own campaign in 2020.

=== Electoral College forecasts ===
Elections analysts and political pundits issue probabilistic forecasts of the composition of the Electoral College. These forecasts use a variety of factors to estimate the likelihood of each candidate winning the Electoral College electors for that state. Most election predictors use the following ratings:

- "tossup": no advantage
- "tilt" (used by some predictors): advantage that is not quite as strong as "lean"
- "lean" or "leans": slight advantage
- "likely": significant, but surmountable, advantage
- "safe" or "solid": near-certain chance of victory

Below is a list of states considered by one or more forecast to be competitive; states that are deemed to be "safe" or "solid" by forecasters RealClearPolitics, Sabato's Crystal Ball, and FiveThirtyEight.

State	EVs	RealClearPolitics November 6, 2012	Sabato's Crystal Ball November 6, 2012	538 November 6, 2012
Arizona	11	Lean R	Solid R	Safe R
Colorado	9	Tossup	Lean D	Likely D
Florida	29	Tossup	Lean R (flip)	Lean D
Iowa	6	Tossup	Lean D	Likely D
Indiana	11	Lean R (flip)	Solid R (flip)	Likely R (flip)
Maine	1	Lean D	Likely D	Safe D
Michigan	16	Tossup	Likely D	Safe D
Minnesota	10	Lean D	Likely D	Safe D
Missouri	11	Lean R	Solid R	Safe R
Nevada	6	Tossup	Likely D	Safe D
New Hampshire	4	Tossup	Lean D	Likely D
New Mexico	5	Lean D	Likely D	Safe D
North Carolina	15	Tossup	Likely R (flip)	Lean R (flip)
Ohio	18	Tossup	Lean D	Safe D
Oregon	7	Lean D	Likely D	Safe D
Pennsylvania	20	Tossup	Lean D	Safe D
Washington	12	Lean D	Solid D	Safe D
Virginia	13	Tossup	Lean R (flip)	Likely D
Wisconsin	10	Tossup	Lean D	Safe D

== Results ==
=== Electoral results ===
On the day of the election, spread betting firm Spreadex offered an Obama Electoral College Votes spread of 296–300 to Romney's 239–243. In fact Obama's victory over Romney was greater, winning 332 electoral votes to Romney's 206. Obama received 51 percent of the national popular vote to Romney's 47 percent and carried eight of the nine states considered to be electoral battlegrounds.

Altogether, Obama won in 26 states plus the District of Columbia, while Romney carried 24 states. Of the 3,154 counties/districts/independent cities making returns, Romney won the most popular votes in 2,447 (77.58%) while Obama carried 707 (22.42%).

The results of the electoral vote were certified by Congress on January 4, 2013.

Popular vote totals are from the Federal Election Commission report.

Electoral results
Presidential candidate	Party	Home state	Popular vote		Electoral vote	Running mate		
Presidential candidate	Party	Home state	Count	Percentage	Electoral vote	Vice-presidential candidate	Home state	Electoral vote
Barack Obama (incumbent)	Democratic	Illinois	65,915,795	51.06%	332	Joe Biden (incumbent)	Delaware	332
Mitt Romney	Republican	Massachusetts	60,933,504	47.20%	206	Paul Ryan	Wisconsin	206
Gary Johnson	Libertarian	New Mexico	1,275,971	0.99%	0	Jim Gray	California	0
Jill Stein	Green	Massachusetts	469,627	0.36%	0	Cheri Honkala	Minnesota	0
Virgil Goode	Constitution	Virginia	122,389	0.09%	0	James N. Clymer	Pennsylvania	0
Roseanne Barr	Peace and Freedom	Hawaii	67,326	0.05%	0	Cindy Sheehan	California	0
Rocky Anderson	Justice	Utah	43,018	0.03%	0	Luis J. Rodriguez	Texas	0
Tom Hoefling	America's	Nebraska	40,628	0.03%	0	J.D. Ellis	Tennessee	0
Other			217,152	0.19%	—	Other		—
Total			129,085,410	100%	538			538
Needed to win					270			270

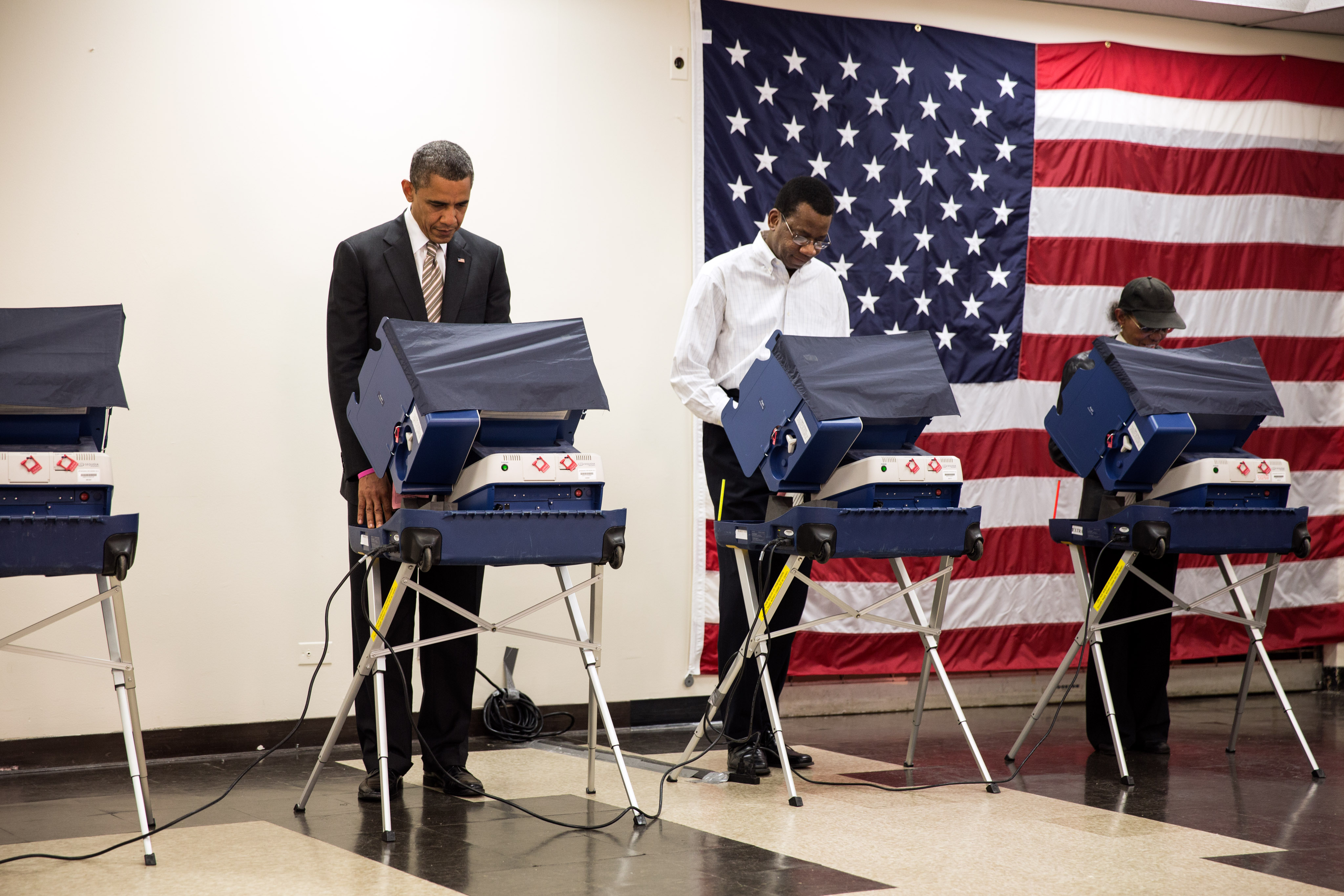
President Obama casts his ballot at the Martin Luther King Jr. Community Center in Chicago.

Popular vote
Obama	51.06%
Romney	47.20%
Johnson	0.99%
Stein	0.36%
Others	0.39%

Electoral vote
Obama	61.71%
Romney	38.29%

=== Results by state ===
The table below displays the official vote tallies by each state's Electoral College voting method. The source for the results of all states, except those that amended their official results, is the official Federal Election Commission report. The column labeled "Margin" shows Obama's margin of victory over Romney (the margin is negative for every state that Romney won).

Legend
States/districts won by Obama/Biden
States/districts won by Romney/Ryan
†	At-large results (for states that split electoral votes)

State or district	Obama/Biden Democratic			Romney/Ryan Republican			Johnson/Gray Libertarian			Stein/Honkala Green			Others			Margin		Margin Swing (Note: Percentage point difference in margin from the 2008 election)	Total votes	
State or district	#	%	EV	#	%	EV	#	%	EV	#	%	EV	#	%	EV	#	%	%	Total votes	
Alabama	795,696	38.36%	–	1,255,925	60.55%	9	12,328	0.59%	–	3,397	0.16%	–	6,992	0.33%	–	−460,229	−22.19%	−0.61%	2,074,338	AL
Alaska	122,640	40.81%	–	164,676	54.80%	3	7,392	2.46%	–	2,917	0.97%	–	2,870	0.96%	–	−42,036	−13.99%	7.55%	300,495	AK
Arizona	1,025,232	44.59%	–	1,233,654	53.65%	11	32,100	1.39%	–	7,816	0.34%	–	452	0.02%	–	−208,422	−9.06%	−0.54%	2,299,254	AZ
Arkansas	394,409	36.88%	–	647,744	60.57%	6	16,276	1.52%	–	9,305	0.87%	–	1,734	0.16%	–	−253,335	−23.69%	−3.84%	1,069,468	AR
California	7,854,285	60.24%	55	4,839,958	37.12%	–	143,221	1.10%	–	85,638	0.66%	–	115,445	0.88%	–	3,014,327	23.12%	−0.94%	13,038,547	CA
Colorado	1,323,102	51.49%	9	1,185,243	46.13%	–	35,545	1.38%	–	7,508	0.29%	–	18,121	0.71%	–	137,858	5.36%	−3.59%	2,569,518	CO
Connecticut	905,083	58.06%	7	634,892	40.73%	–	12,580	0.81%	–	863	0.06%	–	5,542	0.36%	–	270,191	17.33%	−5.04%	1,558,960	CT
Delaware	242,584	58.61%	3	165,484	39.98%	–	3,882	0.94%	–	1,940	0.47%	–	31	0.01%	–	77,100	18.63%	−6.37%	413,921	DE
(Washington, D.C.) District of Columbia	267,070	90.91%	3	21,381	7.28%	–	2,083	0.71%	–	2,458	0.84%	–	772	0.26%	–	245,689	83.63%	−2.29%	293,764	DC
Florida	4,237,756	50.01%	29	4,163,447	49.13%	–	44,726	0.53%	–	8,947	0.11%	–	19,303	0.22%	–	74,309	0.88%	−1.94%	8,474,179	FL
(Georgia (U.S. state)) Georgia	1,773,827	45.48%	–	2,078,688	53.30%	16	45,324	1.16%	–	1,516	0.04%	–	695	0.05%	–	−304,861	−7.82%	−2.61%	3,900,050	GA
Hawaii	306,658	70.55%	4	121,015	27.84%	–	3,840	0.88%	–	3,184	0.73%	–	–	–	–	185,643	42.71%	−2.55%	434,697	HI
Idaho	212,787	32.40%	–	420,911	64.09%	4	9,453	1.44%	–	4,402	0.67%	–	9,189	1.40%	–	−208,124	−31.69%	−6.26%	656,742	ID
Illinois	3,019,512	57.60%	20	2,135,216	40.73%	–	56,229	1.07%	–	30,222	0.58%	–	835	0.02%	–	884,296	16.87%	−8.27%	5,242,014	IL
Indiana	1,152,887	43.93%	–	1,420,543	54.13%	11	50,111	1.91%	–	625	0.02%	–	368	0.01%	–	−267,656	−10.20%	−11.26%	2,624,534	IN
Iowa	822,544	51.99%	6	730,617	46.18%	–	12,926	0.82%	–	3,769	0.24%	–	12,324	0.77%	–	91,927	5.81%	−3.72%	1,582,180	IA
Kansas	440,726	37.99%	–	692,634	59.71%	6	20,456	1.76%	–	714	0.06%	–	5,441	0.48%	–	−251,908	−21.72%	−6.75%	1,159,971	KS
Kentucky	679,370	37.80%	–	1,087,190	60.49%	8	17,063	0.95%	–	6,337	0.35%	–	7,252	0.4%	–	−407,820	−22.69%	−6.46%	1,797,212	KY
Louisiana	809,141	40.58%	–	1,152,262	57.78%	8	18,157	0.91%	–	6,978	0.35%	–	7,527	0.4%	–	−343,121	−17.20%	1.43%	1,994,065	LA
Maine^{†}	401,306	56.27%	2	292,276	40.98%	–	9,352	1.31%	–	8,119	1.14%	–	2,127	0.3%	–	109,030	15.29%	−2.03%	713,180	ME–AL
ME-1	223,035	59.57%	1	142,937	38.18%	–	4,501	1.2%	–	3,946	1.1%	–	–	–	–	80,098	21.39%	−1.43%	374,419	ME1
ME-2	177,998	52.94%	1	149,215	44.38%	–	4,843	1.4%	–	4,170	1.2%	–	–	–	–	28,783	8.56%	−2.69%	336,226	ME2
Maryland	1,677,844	61.97%	10	971,869	35.90%	–	30,195	1.12%	–	17,110	0.63%	–	10,309	0.4%	–	705,975	26.07%	0.63%	2,707,327	MD
Massachusetts	1,921,290	60.65%	11	1,188,314	37.51%	–	30,920	0.98%	–	20,691	0.65%	–	6,552	0.21%	–	732,976	23.14%	−2.67%	3,167,767	MA
Michigan	2,564,569	54.21%	16	2,115,256	44.71%	–	7,774	0.16%	–	21,897	0.46%	–	21,465	0.5%	–	449,313	9.50%	−6.97%	4,730,961	MI
Minnesota	1,546,167	52.65%	10	1,320,225	44.96%	–	35,098	1.20%	–	13,023	0.44%	–	22,048	0.8%	–	225,942	7.69%	−2.55%	2,936,561	MN
Mississippi	562,949	43.79%	–	710,746	55.29%	6	6,676	0.52%	–	1,588	0.12%	–	3,625	0.3%	–	−147,797	−11.50%	1.67%	1,285,584	MS
Missouri	1,223,796	44.38%	–	1,482,440	53.76%	10	43,151	1.56%	–	–	–	–	7,936	0.3%	–	−258,644	−9.38%	−9.25%	2,757,323	MO
Montana	201,839	41.70%	–	267,928	55.35%	3	14,165	2.93%	–	–	–	–	116	nil	–	−66,089	−13.65%	−11.39%	484,048	MT
Nebraska^{†}	302,081	38.03%	–	475,064	59.80%	2	11,109	1.40%	–	–	–	–	6,125	0.77%	–	−172,983	−21.77%	−6.84%	794,379	NE–AL
NE-1	108,082	40.83%	–	152,021	57.43%	1	3,847	1.2%	–	–	–	–	762	0.3%	–	-43,949	-16.60%	−6.83%	264,712	NE1
NE-2	121,889	45.70%	–	140,976	52.85%	1	3,393	1.3%	–	–	–	–	469	0.2%	–	-19,087	-7.15%	−5.94%	266,727	NE2
NE-3	72,110	27.82%	–	182,067	70.23%	1	3,869	1.5%	–	–	–	–	1,177	0.5%	–	−109,957	−42.41%	−3.40%	259,223	NE3
Nevada	531,373	52.36%	6	463,567	45.68%	–	10,968	1.08%	–	–	–	–	9,010	0.89%	–	67,806	6.68%	−5.81%	1,014,918	NV
New Hampshire	369,561	51.98%	4	329,918	46.40%	–	8,212	1.16%	–	324	0.05%	–	2,957	0.4%	–	39,643	5.58%	−4.03%	710,972	NH
New Jersey	2,125,101	58.38%	14	1,477,568	40.59%	–	21,045	0.58%	–	9,888	0.27%	–	6,690	0.2%	–	647,533	17.79%	2.22%	3,640,292	NJ
New Mexico	415,335	52.99%	5	335,788	42.84%	–	27,788	3.55%	–	2,691	0.34%	–	2,156	0.3%	–	79,547	10.15%	−4.98%	783,758	NM
(New York (state)) New York	4,485,741	63.35%	29	2,490,431	35.17%	–	47,256	0.67%	–	39,982	0.56%	–	17,749	0.3%	–	1,995,310	28.18%	1.32%	7,081,159	NY
North Carolina	2,178,391	48.35%	–	2,270,395	50.39%	15	44,515	0.99%	–	–	–	–	12,071	0.27%	–	−92,004	−2.04%	−2.37%	4,505,372	NC
North Dakota	124,827	38.69%	–	188,163	58.32%	3	5,231	1.62%	–	1,361	0.42%	–	3,045	0.9%	–	−63,336	−19.63%	−10.99%	322,627	ND
Ohio	2,827,709	50.67%	18	2,661,437	47.69%	–	49,493	0.89%	–	18,573	0.33%	–	23,635	0.4%	–	166,272	2.98%	−1.61%	5,580,847	OH
Oklahoma	443,547	33.23%	–	891,325	66.77%	7	–	–	–	–	–	–	–	–	–	−447,778	−33.54%	−2.15%	1,334,872	OK
Oregon	970,488	54.24%	7	754,175	42.15%	–	24,089	1.35%	–	19,427	1.09%	–	21,091	1.2%	–	216,313	12.09%	−4.26%	1,789,270	OR
Pennsylvania	2,990,274	51.97%	20	2,680,434	46.59%	–	49,991	0.87%	–	21,341	0.37%	–	11,630	0.2%	–	309,840	5.38%	−4.94%	5,753,670	PA
Rhode Island	279,677	62.70%	4	157,204	35.24%	–	4,388	0.98%	–	2,421	0.54%	–	2,359	0.5%	–	122,473	27.46%	−0.35%	446,049	RI
South Carolina	865,941	44.09%	–	1,071,645	54.56%	9	16,321	0.83%	–	5,446	0.28%	–	4,765	0.24%	–	−205,704	−10.47%	−1.49%	1,964,118	SC
South Dakota	145,039	39.87%	–	210,610	57.89%	3	5,795	1.59%	–	–	–	–	2,371	0.65%	–	−65,571	−18.02%	−9.61%	363,815	SD
Tennessee	960,709	39.08%	–	1,462,330	59.48%	11	18,623	0.76%	–	6,515	0.26%	–	10,400	0.4%	–	−501,621	−20.40%	−5.33%	2,458,577	TN
Texas	3,308,124	41.38%	–	4,569,843	57.17%	38	88,580	1.11%	–	24,657	0.31%	–	2,647	nil	–	−1,261,719	−15.79%	−4.02%	7,993,851	TX
Utah	251,813	24.75%	–	740,600	72.79%	6	12,572	1.24%	–	3,817	0.38%	–	8,638	0.9%	–	−488,787	−48.04%	−19.75%	1,017,440	UT
Vermont	199,239	66.57%	3	92,698	30.97%	–	3,487	1.17%	–	594	0.20%	–	3,272	1.1%	–	106,541	35.60%	−1.41%	299,290	VT
Virginia	1,971,820	51.16%	13	1,822,522	47.28%	–	31,216	0.81%	–	8,627	0.22%	–	20,304	0.5%	–	149,298	3.88%	−2.42%	3,854,489	VA
(Washington (state)) Washington	1,755,396	56.16%	12	1,290,670	41.29%	–	42,202	1.35%	–	20,928	0.67%	–	16,320	0.5%	–	464,726	14.87%	−2.31%	3,125,516	WA
West Virginia	238,269	35.54%	–	417,655	62.30%	5	6,302	0.94%	–	4,406	0.66%	–	3,806	0.57%	–	−179,386	−26.76%	−13.64%	670,438	WV
Wisconsin	1,620,985	52.83%	10	1,407,966	45.89%	–	20,439	0.67%	–	7,665	0.25%	–	11,379	0.4%	–	213,019	6.94%	−6.96%	3,068,434	WI
Wyoming	69,286	27.82%	–	170,962	68.64%	3	5,326	2.14%	–	–	–	–	3,487	1.40%	–	−101,676	−40.82%	−8.58%	249,061	WY
Total	65,915,795	51.06%	332	60,933,504	47.20%	206	1,275,971	0.99%	–	469,627	0.36%	–	490,510	0.4%	–	4,982,291	3.86%	−3.41%	129,085,410	
	Obama/Biden Democratic			Romney/Ryan Republican			Johnson/Gray Libertarian			Stein/Honkala Green			Others			Margin		Margin swing	Total votes	

Maine and Nebraska each allow for their election results votes to be split between candidates. The winner within each congressional district gets one electoral vote for the district. The winner of the statewide vote gets two additional electoral votes. In the 2012 election, all four of Maine's electoral votes were won by Obama and all five of Nebraska's electoral votes were won by Romney.

==== States and EV districts that flipped from Democratic to Republican ====
- Indiana
- Nebraska's 2nd congressional district
- North Carolina

=== Close states ===
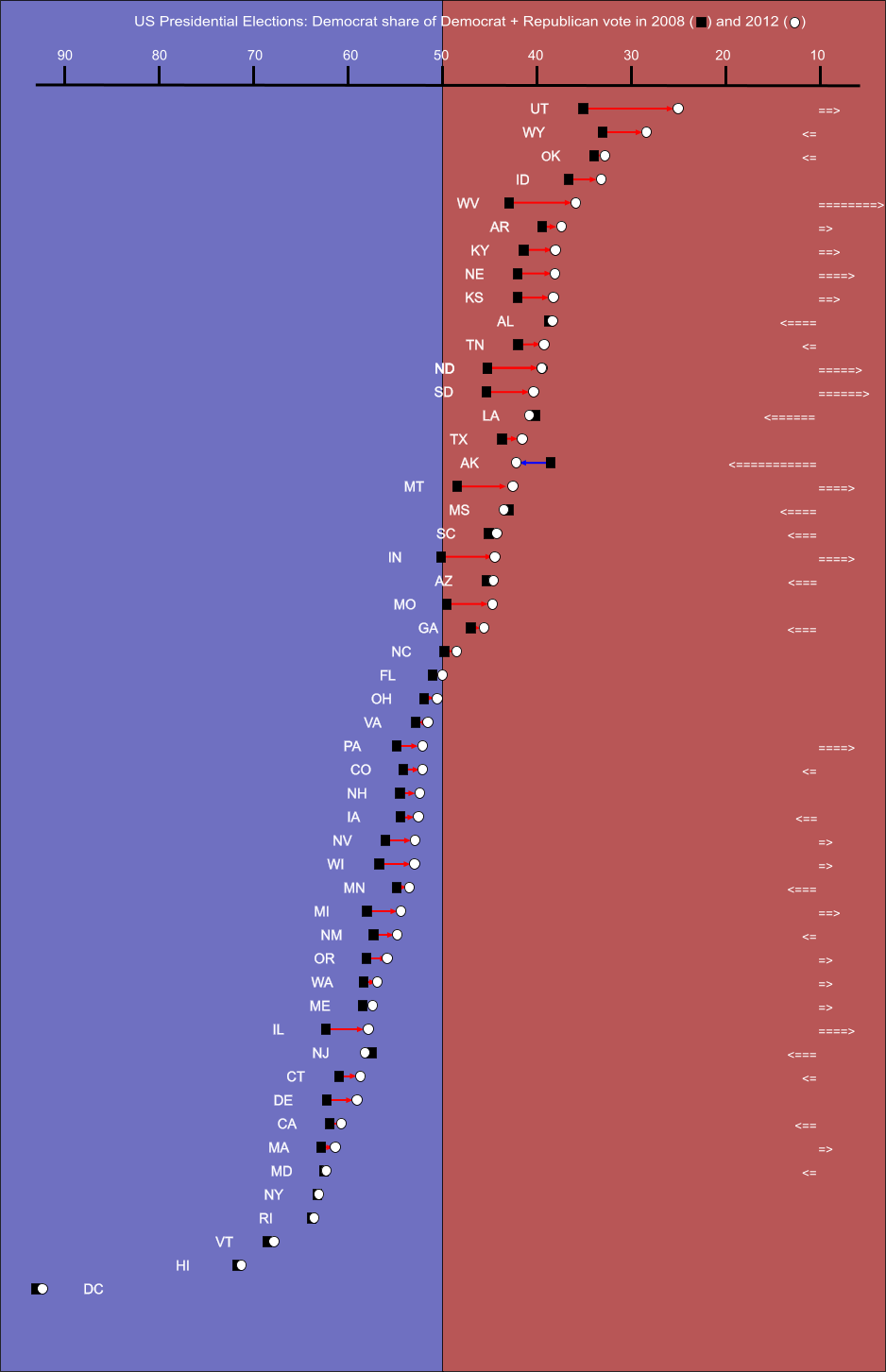
Swing from 2008 to 2012 in each state. Only six states swung more Democratic in 2012: Alaska, Louisiana, Maryland, Mississippi, New Jersey, and New York. The arrows to the right represent how many places up or down on the list the state moved since 2008. States are listed by (increasing) percentage of Democratic votes.

Red denotes states (or congressional districts that contribute an electoral vote) won by Republican Mitt Romney; blue denotes those won by Democrat Barack Obama.

State where the margin of victory was under 1% (29 electoral votes):

1. Florida, 0.88% (74,309 votes)

States where the margin of victory was under 5% (46 electoral votes):

1. North Carolina, 2.04% (92,004 votes)
2. Ohio, 2.98% (166,272 votes)
3. Virginia, 3.88% (149,298 votes)

States/districts where the margin of victory was between 5% and 10% (120 electoral votes):

1. Colorado, 5.36% (137,858 votes) (tipping point state)
2. Pennsylvania, 5.38% (309,840 votes)
3. New Hampshire, 5.58% (39,643 votes)
4. Iowa, 5.81% (91,927 votes)
5. Nevada, 6.68% (67,806 votes)
6. Wisconsin, 6.94% (213,019 votes)
7. Nebraska's 2nd Congressional District, 7.15% (19,087 votes)
8. Minnesota, 7.69% (225,942 votes)
9. Georgia, 7.82% (304,861 votes)
10. Maine's 2nd Congressional District, 8.56% (28,783 votes)
11. Arizona, 9.06% (208,422 votes)
12. Missouri, 9.38% (258,644 votes)
13. Michigan, 9.50% (449,313 votes)

==== Statistics ====
Counties and county-equivalents with highest percentage of Democratic vote:

1. Shannon County, South Dakota 93.39%
2. Kalawao County, Hawaii 92.59%
3. Bronx County, New York 91.45%
4. Washington, D.C. 90.91%
5. Petersburg, Virginia 89.79%

Counties with highest percentage of Republican vote:

1. King County, Texas 95.86%
2. Madison County, Idaho 93.29%
3. Sterling County, Texas 92.91%
4. Franklin County, Idaho 92.77%
5. Roberts County, Texas 92.13%

=== Romney's concession ===
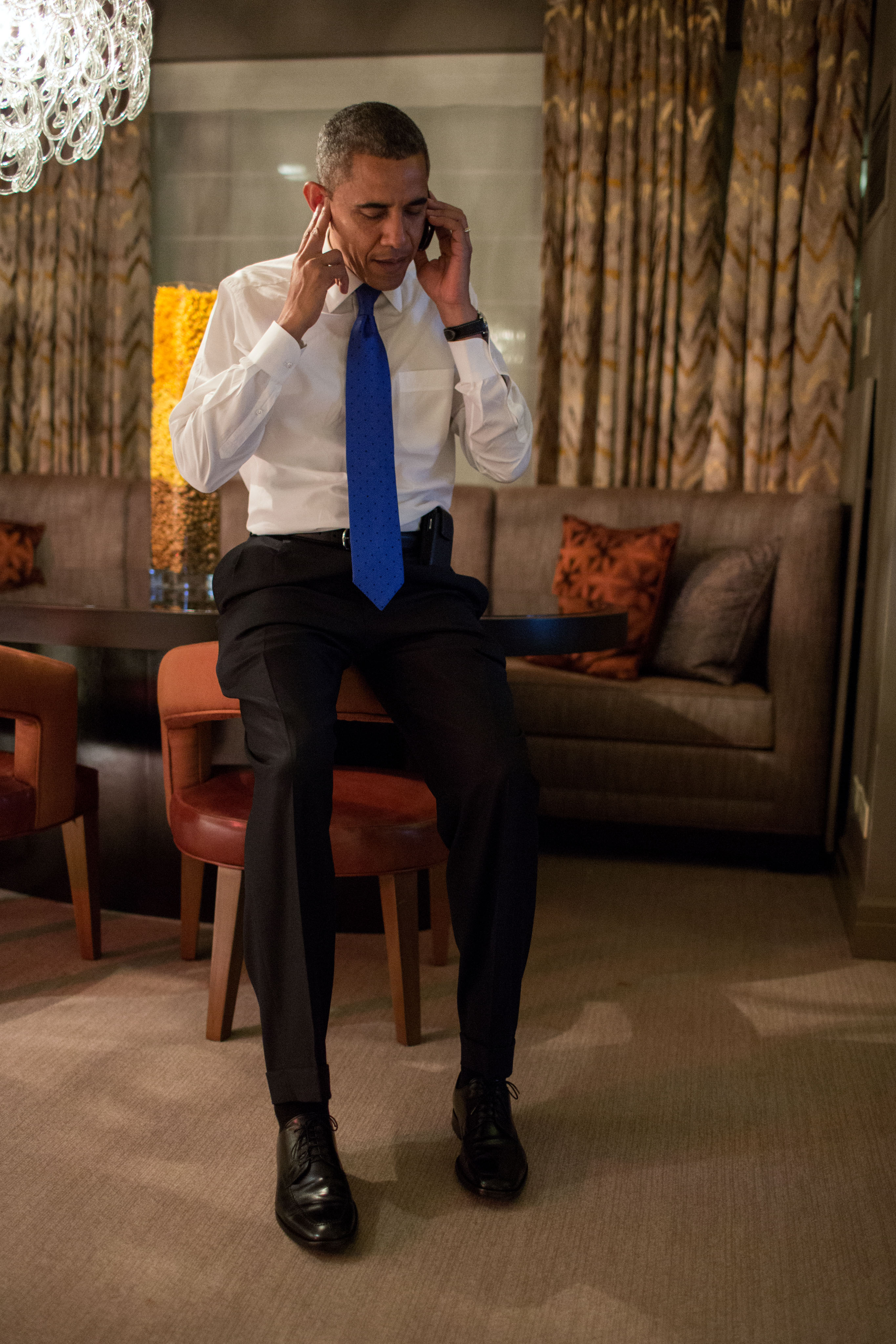
Obama takes a phone call from Romney conceding the election early Wednesday morning in Chicago.

After the networks called Ohio for Obama at around 11:15 pm EST on Election Day, Romney was ready to concede the race, but hesitated when Karl Rove strenuously objected on Fox News to the network's decision to make that call. Ohio was arguably the most critical state for Romney, as no Republican has ever won the presidency without carrying it, as of 2026.

However, after Colorado and Nevada were called for the President (giving Obama enough electoral votes to win even if Ohio were to leave his column), in tandem with Obama's apparent lead in Florida and Virginia (both were eventually called for Obama), Romney acknowledged that he had lost and conceded at around 1:00 am EST on November 7.

Despite public polling showing Romney behind Obama in the swing states of Nevada, Colorado, Iowa, Wisconsin, Ohio, and New Hampshire, tied with Obama in Virginia, and just barely ahead of Obama in Florida, the Romney campaign said they were genuinely surprised by the loss, having believed that public polling was oversampling Democrats. The Romney campaign had already set up a transition website, and had scheduled and purchased a fireworks display to celebrate in case he won the election.

On November 30, 2012, it was revealed that shortly before the election, internal polling done by the Romney campaign had shown Romney ahead in Colorado and New Hampshire, tied in Iowa, and within a few points of Obama in Wisconsin, Pennsylvania, Minnesota, and Ohio. In addition, the Romney campaign had assumed that they would win Florida, North Carolina and Virginia. The polls had made Romney and his campaign team so confident of their victory that Romney did not write a concession speech until Obama's victory was announced.

=== Reactions ===
Foreign leaders reacted with both positive and mixed messages. Most world leaders congratulated and praised Obama on his re-election victory. However, Venezuela and some other states had tempered reactions. Pakistan commented that Romney's defeat had made Pakistan-United States relations safer. Stock markets fell noticeably after Obama's re-election, with the Dow Jones Industrial Average, NASDAQ, and the S&P 500 each declining over two percent the day after the election.

All 50 states had a petition on the White House website We The People calling for their state to secede from the union. These petitions were created by individual people, with some gaining thousands of signatures.

== Voter demographics ==
2012 presidential election by demographic subgroup
Demographic subgroup	Obama	Romney	Other	% of total vote
Total vote	51	47	2	100
Ideology
Liberals	86	11	3	25
Moderates	56	41	3	41
Conservatives	17	82	1	35
Party
Democrats	92	7	1	38
Republicans	6	93	1	32
Independents	45	50	5	29
Gender
Men	45	52	3	47
Women	55	44	1	53
Marital status
Married	42	56	2	60
Unmarried	62	35	3	40
Sex by marital status
Married men	38	60	2	29
Married women	46	53	1	31
Single men	56	40	4	18
Single women	67	31	2	23
Race/ethnicity
White	39	59	2	72
Black	93	6	1	13
Asian	73	26	1	3
Other	58	38	4	2
Hispanic	71	27	2	10
Religion
Protestant or other Christian	42	57	1	53
Catholic	50	48	2	25
Mormon	21	78	1	2
Jewish	69	30	1	2
Muslim	85	4	11	1
Other	74	23	3	7
None	70	26	4	12
Religious service attendance
More than once a week	36	63	1	14
Once a week	41	58	1	28
A few times a month	55	44	1	13
A few times a year	56	42	2	27
Never	62	34	4	17
White evangelical or born-again Christian?
White evangelical or born-again Christian	21	78	1	26
Everyone else	60	37	3	74
Age
18–24 years old	60	36	4	11
25–29 years old	60	38	2	8
30–39 years old	55	42	3	17
40–49 years old	48	50	2	20
50–64 years old	47	52	1	28
65 and older	44	56	0	16
Age by race
Whites 18–29 years old	44	51	5	11
Whites 30–44 years old	38	59	3	18
Whites 45–64 years old	38	61	1	29
Whites 65 and older	39	61	n/a	14
Blacks 18–29 years old	91	8	1	3
Blacks 30–44 years old	94	5	1	4
Blacks 45–64 years old	93	7	n/a	4
Blacks 65 and older	93	6	1	1
Latinos 18–29 years old	74	23	3	4
Latinos 30–44 years old	71	28	1	3
Latinos 45–64 years old	68	31	1	3
Latinos 65 and older	65	35	n/a	1
Others	67	31	2	5
LGBT
Yes	76	22	2	5
No	49	49	2	95
Education
Not a high school graduate	64	35	1	3
High school graduate	51	48	1	21
Some college education	49	48	3	29
College graduate	47	51	2	29
Postgraduate education	55	42	3	18
Family income
Under $30,000	63	35	2	20
$30,000–49,999	57	42	1	21
$50,000–99,999	46	52	2	31
$100,000–199,999	44	54	2	21
$200,000–249,999	47	52	1	3
Over $250,000	42	55	3	4
Union households
Union	58	40	2	18
Non-union	49	48	3	82
Issue regarded as most important
Economy	47	51	2	59
Federal budget deficit	32	66	2	15
Foreign policy	56	33	11	5
Health care	75	24	1	18
Region
Northeast	59	40	1	18
Midwest	50	48	2	24
South	46	53	1	36
West	54	43	3	22
Community size
Big cities (population over 500,000)	69	29	2	11
Mid-sized cities (population 50,000 to 500,000)	58	40	2	21
Suburbs	48	50	2	47
Towns (population 10,000 to 50,000)	42	56	2	8
Rural areas	37	61	2	14

=== Hispanic vote ===
The United States has a population of 50 million Hispanic and Latino Americans, 27 million of whom are citizens eligible to vote (13% of total eligible voters). Traditionally, only half of eligible Hispanic voters vote (around 7% of voters); of them, 71% voted for Barack Obama (increasing his percentage of the vote by 5%); therefore, the Hispanic vote was an important factor in Obama's re-election, since the vote difference between the two main parties was only 3.9%

Exit polls were conducted by Edison Research of Somerville, New Jersey, for the National Election Pool, a consortium which at the time consisted of ABC News, Associated Press, CBS News, CNN, Fox News, and NBC News.

== Analysis ==
Upon his re-election in 2012, Obama became the third consecutive president to be elected to a second term (after his immediate predecessors Bill Clinton and George W. Bush). This only happened once before, when James Monroe was re-elected in 1820, after Thomas Jefferson and James Madison had served two terms each. The 2012 election was the first election since 1928 in which neither major-party ticket featured a presidential or vice presidential candidate with any military experience. The election was arguably decided by three counties: Miami-Dade County (Florida); Cuyahoga County (Ohio) and Philadelphia (Pennsylvania). If these three counties had cast zero votes, Obama would have lost all three states and the election.

Obama won three states that have not voted Democratic since: Florida, Ohio, and Iowa. This was also the last election that the Democratic candidate won Maine's 2nd congressional district. This election marked the first time since Franklin D. Roosevelt's last two re-elections in 1940 and 1944 that the Democratic nominee won a majority of the popular vote (as opposed to a plurality) in two consecutive elections. Obama also became the first president of either party to secure a majority of the popular vote in two consecutive elections since Ronald Reagan in 1980 and 1984. Obama is the third Democratic president to secure at least 51% of the vote twice, after Andrew Jackson and Franklin D. Roosevelt. Romney won the popular vote in 226 congressional districts making this the first time since 1960 that the winner of the election did not win the popular vote in a majority of the congressional districts. This is the last time that the Democratic nominee won a majority of states in a presidential election.

Romney lost his home state of Massachusetts, becoming the first major party presidential candidate to lose his home state since Democrat Al Gore lost his home state of Tennessee to Republican George W. Bush in 2000. Romney lost his home state by more than 23%, the worst losing margin for a major party candidate since John Frémont in 1856. Even worse than Frémont, Romney failed to win a single county in his home state, something last seen by Theodore Roosevelt in 1912. In addition, since Obama carried Ryan's home state of Wisconsin, the Romney–Ryan ticket was the first major party ticket since 1972 to have both of its nominees lose their home states. Romney won the popular vote in every county of three states: Utah, Oklahoma, and West Virginia; Obama did so in four states: Vermont, Massachusetts, Rhode Island, and Hawaii.

Romney's loss prompted the Republican National Committee to try to appeal to the American Latino population by concentrating on different approaches to immigration. These were short-lived due to activity and anger from the Republican base and may have contributed to the selection of Donald Trump as their party's presidential nominee four years later.

Gary Johnson's popular vote total set a Libertarian Party record, and his popular vote percentage was the second-best showing for a Libertarian in a presidential election, trailing only Ed Clark's in 1980. Johnson would go on to beat this record in the 2016 presidential election, winning the most votes for the Libertarian ticket in history. At the time, Green Party candidate Jill Stein's popular vote total made her the most successful female presidential candidate in a general election in United States history. This was later surpassed by Hillary Clinton in 2016.

Obama is the fifth incumbent Democratic president to have won re-election to a second term, along with Andrew Jackson, Woodrow Wilson, Franklin D. Roosevelt, and Bill Clinton. (Note: In 1892, Democrat Grover Cleveland won a second non-consecutive term, after losing his re-election campaign in 1888.) Obama is also the most recent incumbent Democratic president to have won re-election to a second term. This presidential election was the most recent in which no state split its electoral votes, and the most recent in which a candidate received over 60% of the Electoral College vote. This is the most recent election in which two major party nominees would go on to become president (namely, Obama and Biden).

Obama's vote total was the fourth most votes received (behind Obama's 2008 victory and both major candidates in 2020) prior to 2024 and the most ever for a re-elected incumbent president. (Note: In 2024, Donald Trump was elected to a second non-consecutive term. Trump's vote total in 2024 was the second most votes received (behind only Biden's vote total in 2020).) The election marked the first time since 1988 in which no state was won by a candidate with a plurality of the state's popular vote. Furthermore, it is the only post-World War II presidential election in which no states were won by margins smaller than 30,000 votes. Obama's narrowest victories were in New Hampshire by 39,643 votes, followed by Florida by 74,309 votes. Every other presidential election in modern history has seen states narrowly won by several thousand votes. As of 2026, this is also the most recent election in which both all of Maine and Nebraska's electoral votes were won by one candidate.

So far, this is the only presidential election in history where both the Republican and Democratic vice presidential candidates are practicing Roman Catholics. It is also the only presidential election where there are no white Protestants on a major party ticket. As of 2026, Obama is the most recent incumbent president to have won re-election to a second term, (Note: Donald Trump was elected to a second non-consecutive term in 2024, after losing his re-election campaign in 2020.) and this is also the most recent election where any major party won consecutive elections.

Obama was the first Democrat since Franklin D. Roosevelt to win a majority of the popular vote more than once. While Obama was the first president since Dwight D. Eisenhower in 1952 and 1956 to receive more than 51% of the popular vote twice, he was also the first president since Franklin D. Roosevelt in 1936, 1940, and 1944 to win consecutive presidential elections with declining percentages of the popular vote. (Note: While elected to non-consecutive terms, Grover Cleveland won the 1892 presidential election while receiving a smaller percentage of the popular vote than he received when he won in 1884. While Andrew Jackson received a smaller percentage of the popular vote in 1832 than he received in 1828, the presidential electors of Delaware in 1828 and South Carolina in both elections were appointed at the discretion of the state legislature rather than by popular vote.)

Obama was the most recent of just four presidents in United States history to win re-election with a lower percentage of the electoral vote than in their prior elections, the other three were James Madison in 1812, Woodrow Wilson in 1916 and Franklin D. Roosevelt in 1940 and 1944. Additionally, Obama was the fifth of only five presidents to win re-election with a smaller percentage of the popular vote than in prior elections, the other four are James Madison in 1812, Andrew Jackson in 1832, Grover Cleveland in 1892, and Franklin D. Roosevelt in 1940 and 1944.

All four major candidates for president and vice president went on to hold significant public office after this election. Obama and Biden served their second terms as president and vice president, respectively. Biden initially retired from politics after leaving office, but later was elected president in 2020, defeating Trump, and served one term. Romney moved to Utah in 2014 and was elected to the Senate there in 2018, succeeding Orrin Hatch, and served one term. Ryan served three more terms in the House and eventually served as Speaker from 2015 until his retirement from politics in 2019.

=== Maps ===
Results by state, shaded according to winning candidate's percentage of the vote

Results by state and the District of Columbia, scaled by number of electors per state

Cartogram of the electoral vote results, with each square representing one electoral vote

Results by county. (Note: Alaska and Louisiana do not have counties. Alaska's boroughs and census areas and Louisiana's parishes are pictured.) Blue denotes counties that went to Obama; red denotes counties that went to Romney. Hawaii, Massachusetts, Rhode Island, and Vermont had all counties go to Obama. Oklahoma, Utah, and West Virginia had all counties go to Romney.

Results by county, shaded according to winning candidate's percentage of the vote

Results by county flips from 2008 to the 2012 presidential election

Margin swing in each state between the 2008 and 2012 presidential elections

County swing from 2008 to 2012

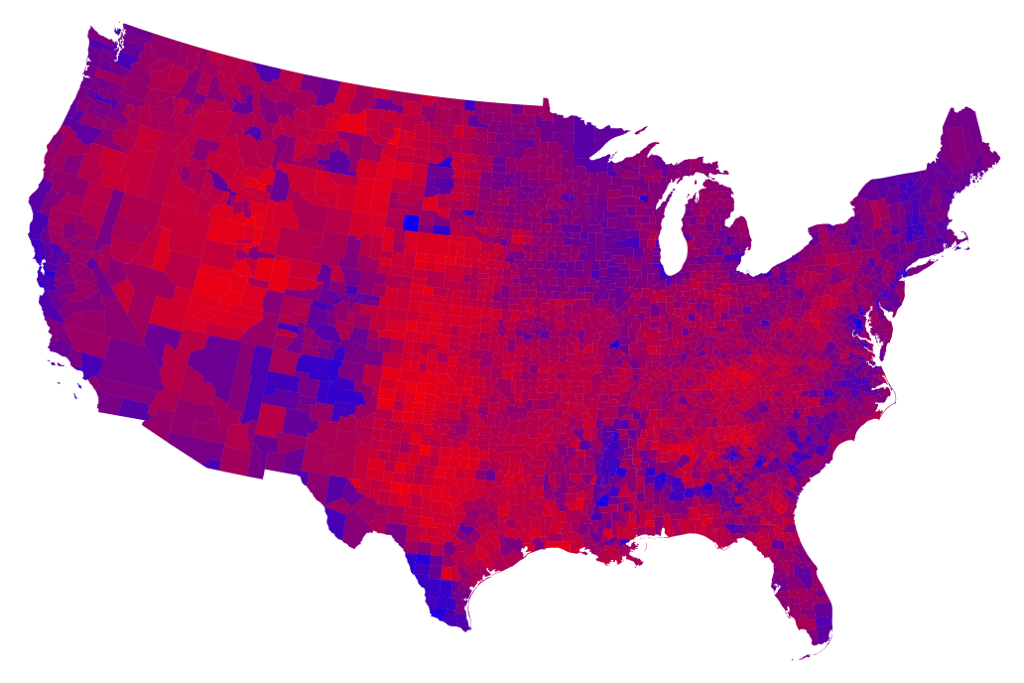
Popular vote by county shaded on a scale from red/Republican to blue/Democratic

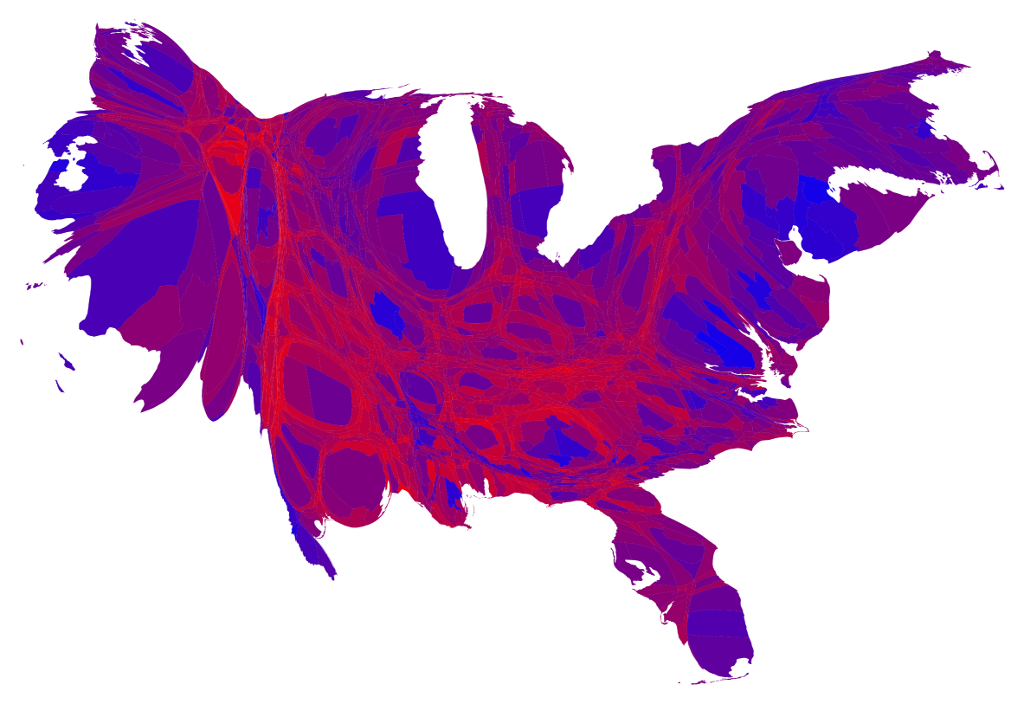
Cartogram of popular vote by county shaded on a scale from red/Republican to blue/Democratic where each county has been rescaled in proportion to its population

Results by congressional district

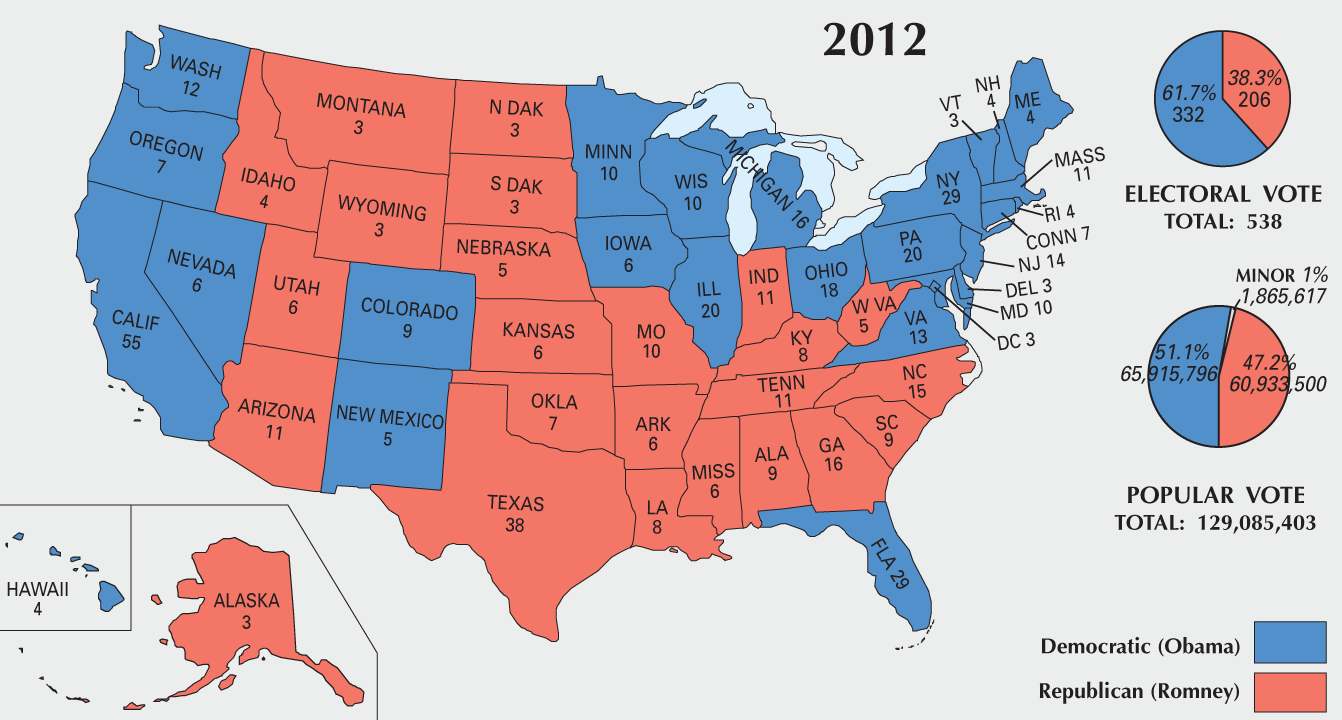
Results by state with pie charts for the electoral college and popular vote.

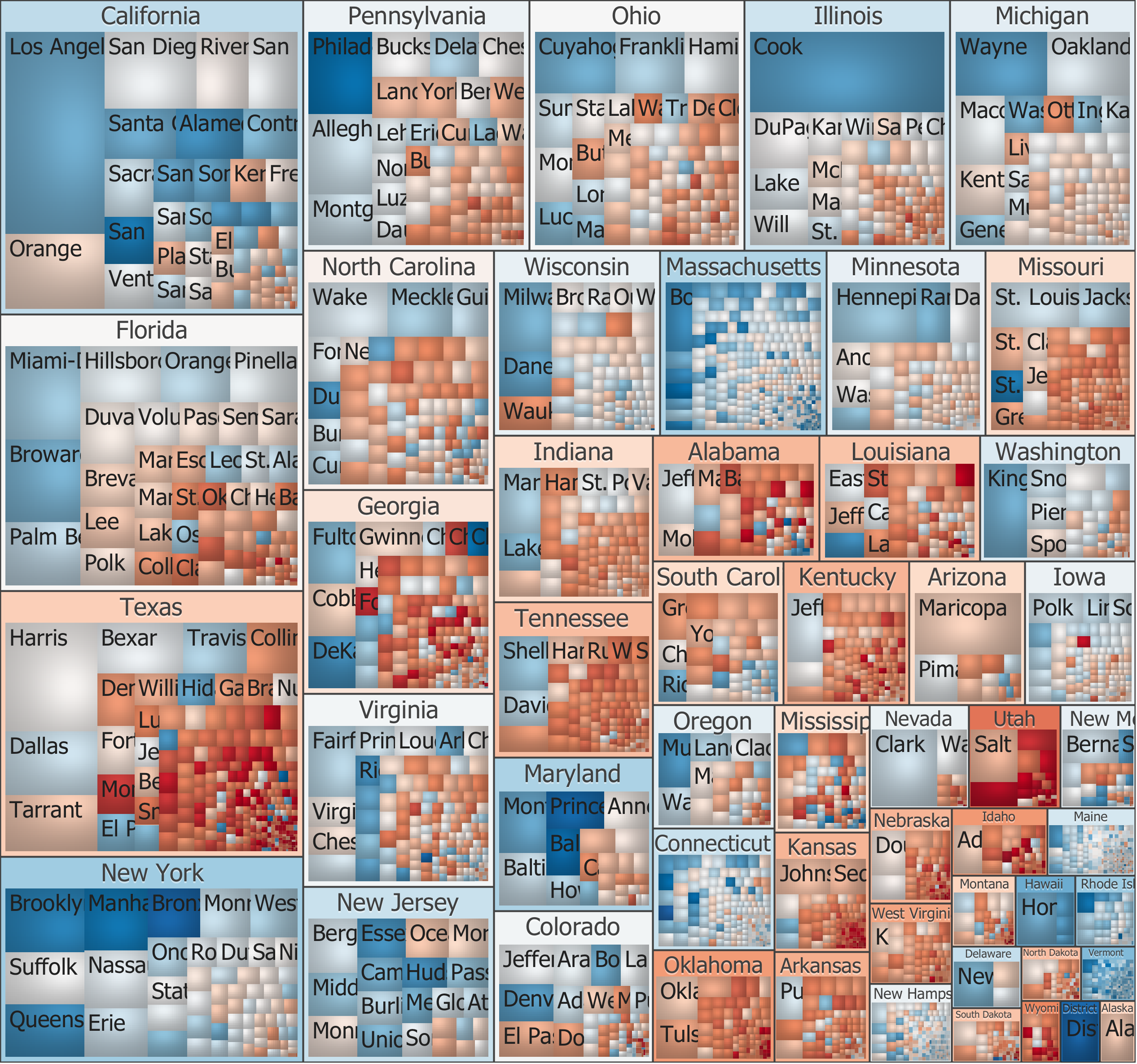
Treemap of the popular vote by county, state, and locally predominant recipient

== Gallery ==
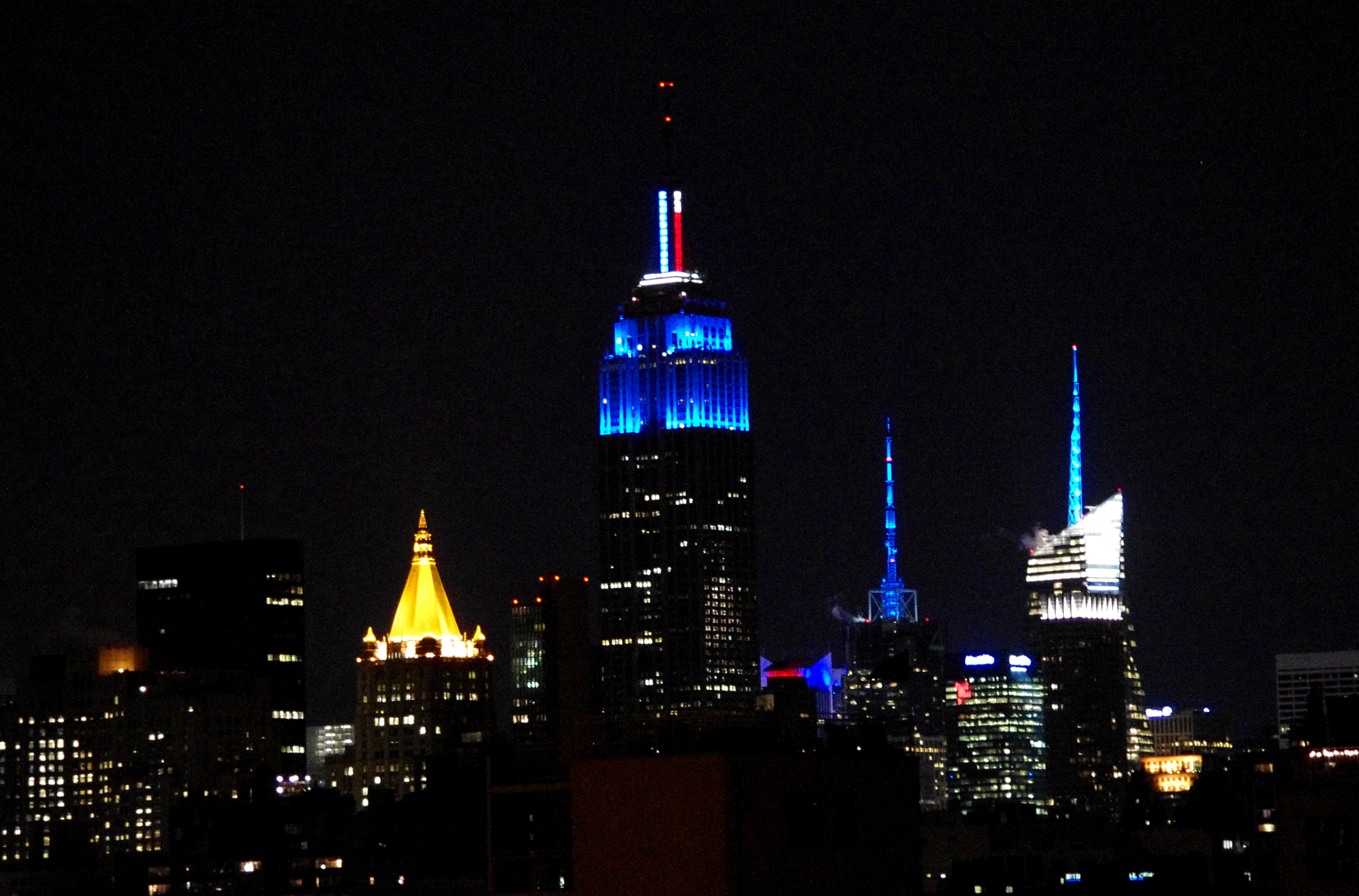
The Empire State Building in New York City was lit blue when CNN called Ohio for Obama, projecting him the winner of the election. Red would have been used if Romney won.

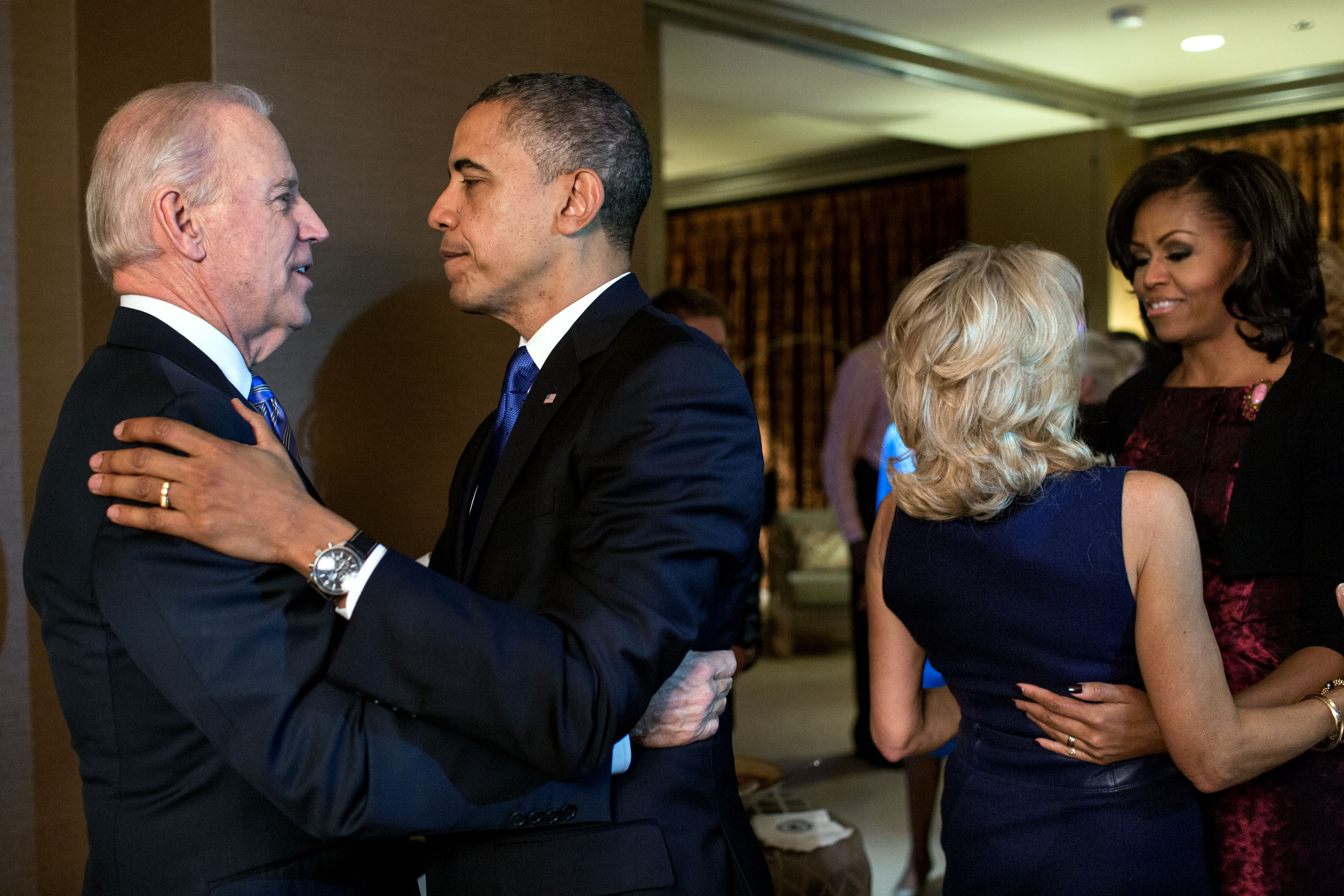
The Obamas and the Bidens embrace following the television announcement of their re-election victory.

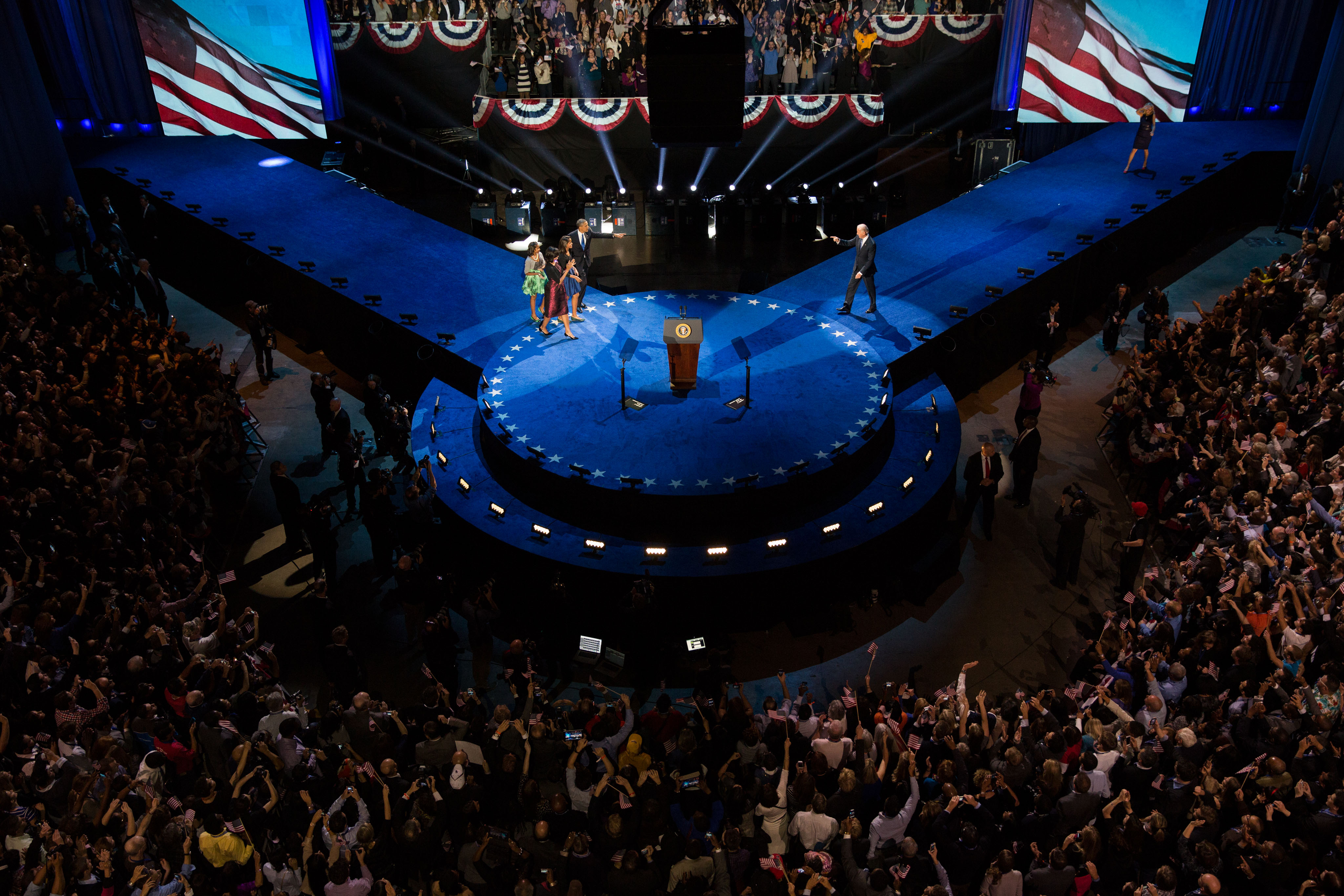
The Obamas and the Bidens walk on stage at the election night victory celebration at McCormick Place in Chicago.

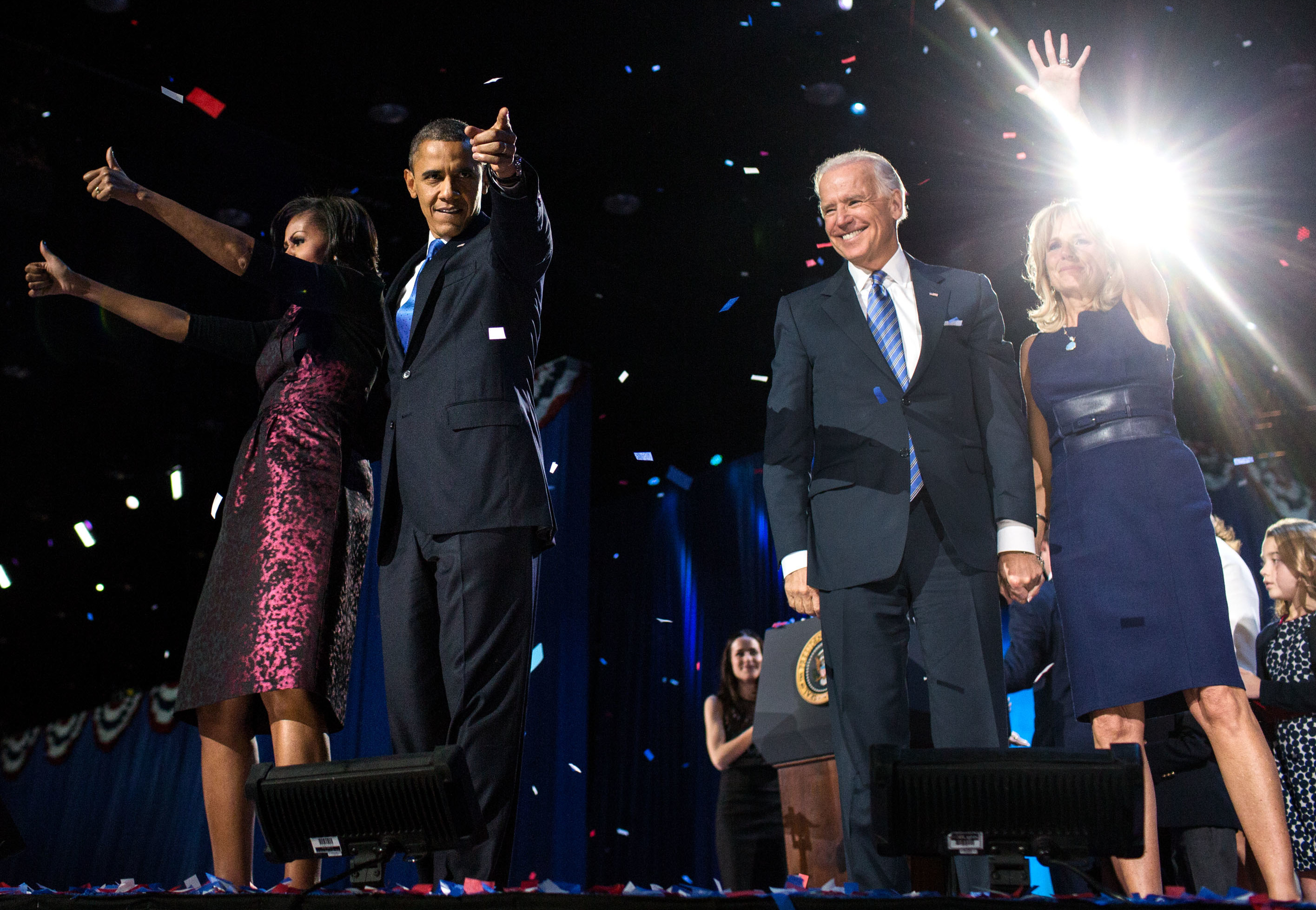
The Obamas and the Bidens celebrate their re-election victory.

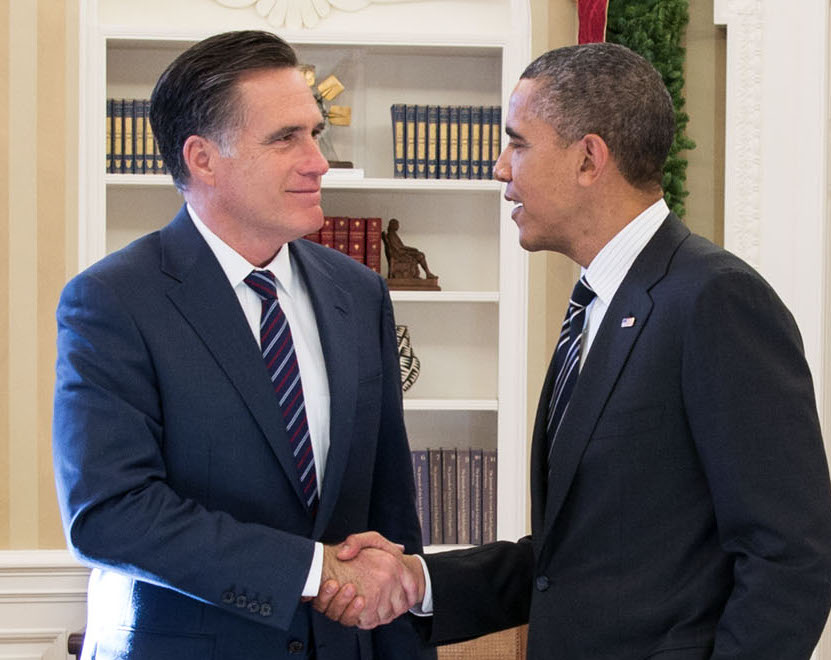
Former governor Romney meets with President Obama at the White House after the 2012 presidential election.

== See also ==
- Planned presidential transition of Mitt Romney
- Bill Clinton's speech at the 2012 Democratic National Convention
- 2012 United States Senate elections
- 2012 United States House of Representatives elections
- 2012 United States gubernatorial elections
- Nationwide opinion polling for the 2012 United States presidential election
- Statewide opinion polling for the 2012 United States presidential election
- Timeline of the 2012 United States presidential election
- Second inauguration of Barack Obama
