= 2012 United States presidential debates =

Part of the 2012 U.S. presidential election

- October 3, 2012; October 16, 2012; October 22, 2012

Nominee	Barack Obama	Mitt Romney
Party	Democratic	Republican
Home state	Illinois	Massachusetts
- 2012 United States vice presidential debate
- October 11, 2012
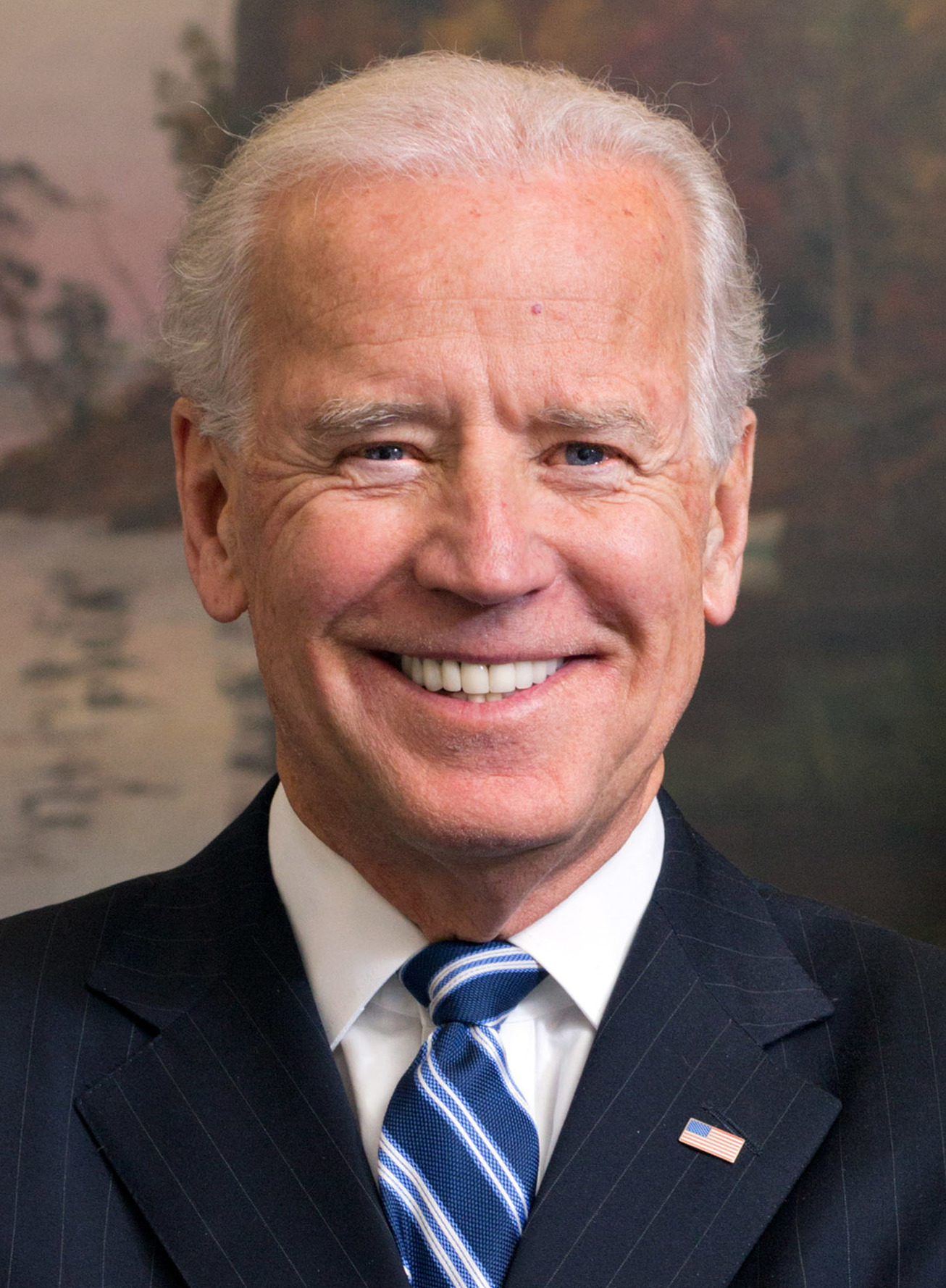

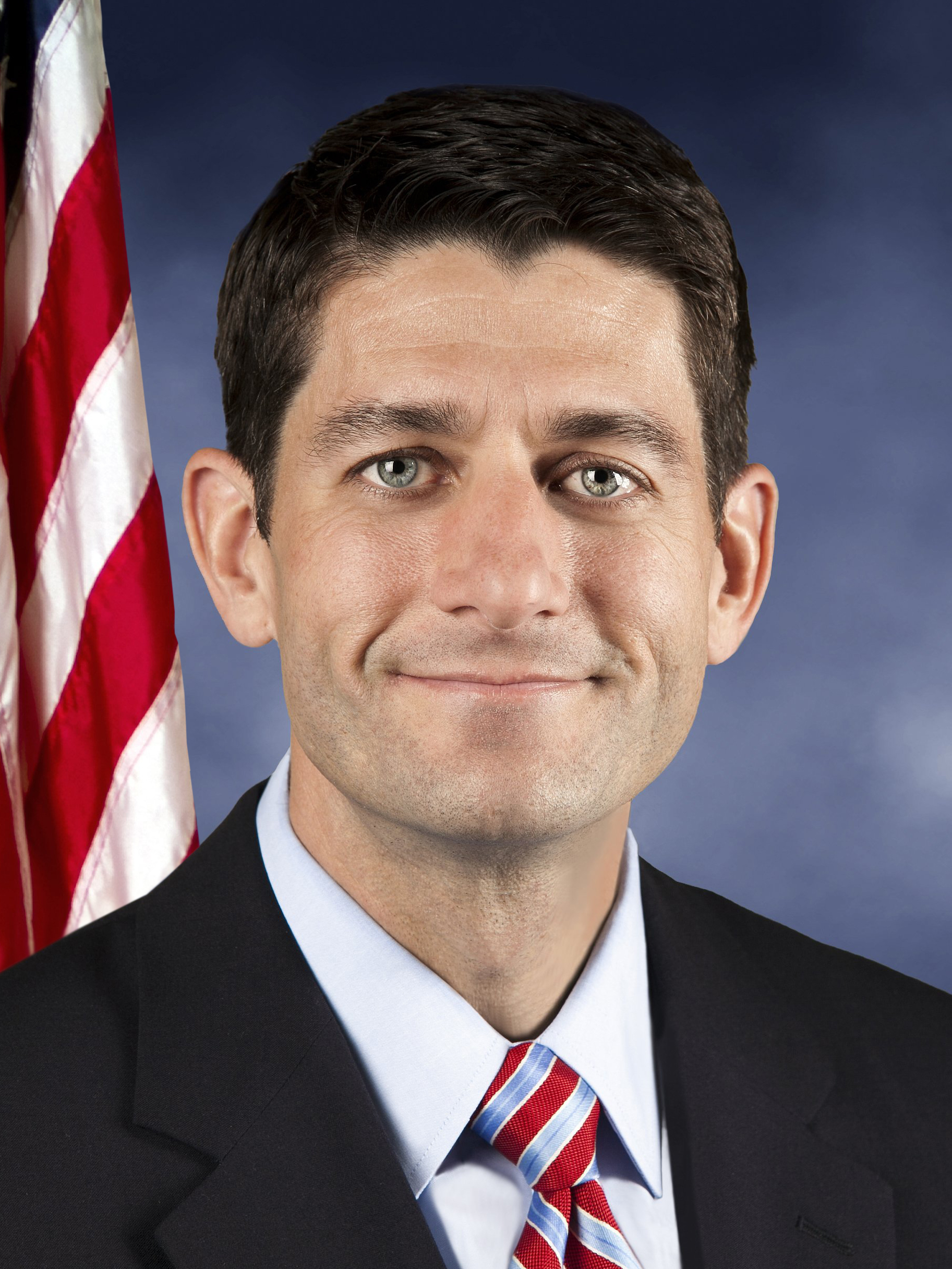
Nominee	Joe Biden	Paul Ryan
Party	Democratic	Republican
Home state	Delaware	Wisconsin

The 2012 United States presidential debates were a series of debates held during the 2012 presidential election.

The Commission on Presidential Debates (CPD), a bipartisan organization formed in 1987, organized four debates among the major party candidates, sponsored three presidential debates and one vice presidential debate. Only Democratic nominee Barack Obama and Republican nominee Mitt Romney met the criteria for inclusion in the debates, and thus were the only two to appear in the debates sponsored by the Commission on Presidential Debates. The CPD-sponsored vice presidential debate took place between their respective vice presidential running mates, Joe Biden and Paul Ryan.

The CPD stipulates three criteria for eligibility: constitutionally eligible, appearance on enough ballots to potentially reach 270 electoral votes, and average at least 15% on five selected national polls. Obama and Romney satisfied all requirements to participate. The moderators for the debates were announced on August 13, 2012.

All four debates took place between 9 p.m. and 10:30 p.m. EDT. Subsequently, on October 3, both campaigns executed a memorandum of understanding governing technical and administrative details of the debate. The agreement describes the role of the moderator, rules applicable to each debate, staging and seating arrangements, and ticket distribution, and was signed by Robert Bauer and Benjamin Ginsberg, general counsel of the Obama and Romney campaigns, respectively.

Several non-CPD sanctioned debates among third party candidates took place. The first, moderated by Larry King and organized by the Free and Equal Elections Foundation, took place on October 23 between Rocky Anderson, Virgil Goode, Gary Johnson, and Jill Stein. Stein and Johnson were selected using instant-runoff voting for a second Free and Equal debate, which was hosted by RT and took place on November 5. Ralph Nader hosted and moderated a debate between Anderson, Stein, Goode, and Johnson on November 4.

== Debate schedule ==
2012 United States presidential election debates
No.	Date & Time	Host	Location	Moderator	Participants	
Key: P Participant. N Non-invitee.					Democratic	Republican
Key: P Participant. N Non-invitee.					President Barack Obama of Illinois	Governor Mitt Romney of Massachusetts
1	Wednesday October 3, 2012, 9:00 – 10:30 p.m. EDT	University of Denver	Denver, Colorado	Jim Lehrer of PBS	P	P
2	Tuesday, October 16, 2012, 9:00 – 10:30 p.m. EDT	Hofstra University	Hempstead, New York	Candy Crowley of CNN	P	P
3	Monday, October 22, 2012, 9:00 – 10:30 p.m. EDT	Lynn University	Boca Raton, Florida	Bob Scheiffer of CBS	P	P
2012 United States vice presidential debate
No.	Date & Time	Host	Location	Moderator	Participants	
Key: P Participant. N Non-invitee.					Democratic	Republican
Key: P Participant. N Non-invitee.					Vice President Joe Biden of Delaware	Congressman Paul Ryan of Wisconsin
VP	Thursday, October 11, 2012, 9:00 – 10:30 p.m. EDT	Centre College	Danville, Kentucky	Martha Raddatz of ABC	P	P

First presidential debate (domestic policy)

Wednesday, October 3; Magness Arena, University of Denver, Denver, Colorado
Moderator: Jim Lehrer – PBS
Video: C-SPAN, BBC, YouTube
Transcripts: CPD, CNN, NPR w/audio, Washington Post, LA Times, The New York Times
Fact-checking: FactCheck.org, Washington Post

Vice presidential (domestic and foreign policy)

Thursday, October 11; Norton Center for the Arts, Centre College, Danville, Kentucky
Moderator: Martha Raddatz – ABC
Video: C-SPAN, BBC, YouTube
Transcripts: CPD, CNN, NPR w/audio, Washington Post
Fact-checking: FactCheck.org, PolitiFact.com, Washington Post

Second presidential debate (town hall format)

Tuesday, October 16; David S. Mack Sports and Exhibition Complex, Hofstra University, Hempstead, New York
Moderator: Candy Crowley – CNN
Video: C-SPAN, BBC, YouTube
Transcripts: CPD, CNN, NPR w/audio, McClatchy, Washington Post
Fact-checking: Boston.com, FactCheck.org, Politico, PolitiFact.com, The New York Times, The Washington Post

IVN.us online presidential debate (third party)

Thursday, October 18; Google+ hangout
Moderator: Stephen Peace - IVN.us
Video: YouTube

Third presidential debate (foreign policy)

Monday, October 22; Wold Performing Arts Center, Lynn University, Boca Raton, Florida
Moderator: Bob Schieffer – CBS
Video: C-SPAN, BBC, YouTube
Transcripts: CPD, CNN, NPR w/audio, McClatchy, Washington Post
Fact-checking: Boston.com, FactCheck.org, Politico, PolitiFact.com, The New York Times, The Washington Post

First Free and Equal Elections Foundation debate (third party)

Tuesday, October 23; Hilton Chicago, Chicago, Illinois
Moderator: Larry King – Ora.TV
Video: C-SPAN, Video on YouTube
Fact-checking: The Washington Post

Ralph Nader presidential debate (third party)

Sunday, November 4; Busboys and Poets, Washington, D.C.
Moderator: Ralph Nader
Video: Video on YouTube

== October 3: First presidential debate (University of Denver) ==
First presidential debate
- Date(s): October 3, 2012
- Duration: 90 minutes
- Venue: University of Denver
- Location: Denver, Colorado
- Participants: Barack Obama; Mitt Romney
- Moderator(s): Jim Lehrer of PBS

=== Format ===
According to the memorandum of understanding agreed to by both campaigns prior to the debate, and announced to the public prior to the start, both candidates would have no opening statement. There were six 15-minute segments, with the moderator introducing a topic and giving one candidate two minutes, the other candidate two minutes, and approximately 8 minutes and 45 seconds of facilitated discussion between the two candidates, with both candidates receiving approximately equal time. However, due to candidate responses extending beyond the limit, the last few segments were markedly shorter. Both candidates spoke in front of a lectern. Other than applause at the beginning and end of the debate, there was no audience participation.

The segments were on the economy and job creation, the federal deficit, entitlements and differences between the candidates on Social Security, health care and the Affordable Care Act, the role and mission of the federal government of the United States, and governing in a presidential system and dealing with gridlock.

=== Reception ===
More than 67 million Americans watched the debate, making it the most widely viewed first presidential debate in 32 years. A CBS poll of uncommitted voters found that 46% thought that Romney had done better, 22% thought Obama had done better, and 32% thought that it was a tie. A CNN poll found a greater advantage for Romney among debate watchers overall, with 67% believing the former Massachusetts governor had done better, 25% believing that the president had done better, and 8% believing that it was a tie. A Gallup poll found that 72% of the debate watchers believed Romney was the clear winner, 20% believed that Obama had won, and 9% believed it was a tie or had no opinion; the widest margin of victory for any presidential debate in Gallup history. Time magazine's Joe Klein stated, "It was, in fact, one of the most inept performances I've ever seen by a sitting President."

The primary critiques of Obama's performance were that he looked detached; seldom addressed his opponent directly; and was often looking down while Romney was speaking.

Several independent fact checkers noted that a number of factual discrepancies were found in various statements made by both Obama and Romney in the debate. The Houston Chronicle reported that its "study of post-debate reports from factcheck.org, politifact.com, CBS, CNN, The Washington Post, and Politico found that both Obama and Romney stretched the facts [in the debate]. But Obama did it a little less."

=== Moderation ===
The performance of Jim Lehrer as the moderator was widely criticized for frequently allowing the candidates to speak over their time limits. He said that he intended to have a looser format and was not trying to restrict the candidates.

Fox News wrote, "The only consolation President Barack Obama had for his poor showing during Wednesday's debate was that moderator Jim Lehrer did even worse." Dan Abrams of ABC News tweeted, "Regardless of who is winning this debate, Jim Lehrer is losing".

Lehrer defended his performance saying, "I've always said this and finally I had a chance to demonstrate it: The moderator should be seen little and heard even less. It is up to the candidates to ask the follow-up questions and challenge one another." Unlike many others, both Romney and Obama made favorable remarks about Lehrer.

== October 11: Vice presidential debate (Centre College) ==
Vice presidential debate
- Date(s): October 11, 2012
- Duration: 90 minutes
- Venue: Centre College
- Location: Danville, Kentucky
- Participants: Joe Biden; Paul Ryan
- Moderator(s): Martha Raddatz of ABC

=== Format ===
The only vice presidential debate between Vice President Joe Biden and Congressman Paul Ryan focused on domestic and foreign policy, and was broken down into nine 10-minute segments. The foreign policy segments included questions on the attack on the American consulate in Libya, Iran, the civil war in Syria, and Afghanistan. The domestic policy segments included questions on health care, abortion, the national debt, Social Security, Medicare, and taxes.

=== Reception ===
A CBS poll of uncommitted voters found that 50% of those viewers thought Biden did better, 31% thought Ryan did better, and 19% thought they tied. A Reuters poll indicated Biden the superior candidate, 42% to 35% with 23% undecided or believing they tied. A CNN poll of debate watchers found that 48% of viewers believed Ryan had done better, 44% believed Biden had done better, and 8% believed they tied or had no opinion; CNN noted that the debate audience polled was about eight percentage points more Republican than the general population. Nate Silver's analysis of polling after the debate led to his concluding that, though both debaters performed adequately, Biden's performance helped to slow the momentum of the Romney campaign following the first presidential debate.

The debate was watched by over 51 million people, making it the third most-watched vice presidential debate, behind that of 1984 (57 million) and 2008 (70 million).

=== Moderation ===
Raddatz was generally praised for her moderation during this debate. Sarah Palin, the former Alaska Governor and 2008 Republican vice presidential nominee, criticized her for being too "tough" on Paul Ryan.

== October 16: Second presidential debate (Hofstra University) ==
Second presidential debate
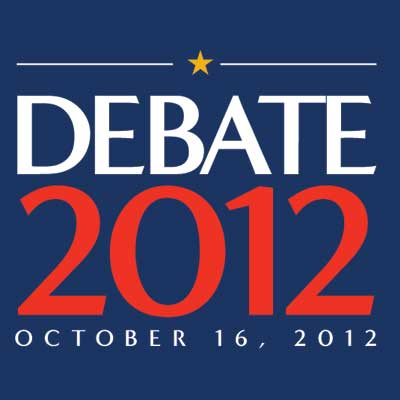
- Date(s): October 16, 2012
- Duration: 90 minutes
- Venue: Hofstra University
- Location: Hempstead, New York
- Participants: Barack Obama; Mitt Romney
- Moderator(s): Candy Crowley of CNN

The second presidential debate took place on Tuesday, October 16, 2012, at New York's Hofstra University, and was moderated by Candy Crowley of CNN. The debate followed a town hall format, with a group of noncommitted voters asking questions to the candidates, after which the moderator would ask follow-up questions.

The second debate dealt primarily with domestic affairs, but, unlike the first debate, did include some segues into foreign policy. Topics discussed included taxes, unemployment, job creation, the national debt, energy and energy independence, women's rights, both legal and illegal immigration, and the recent attack on the U.S. consulate in Benghazi, Libya.

=== Format ===
The Gallup Organization selected 82 undecided voters from the New York area to attend the debate. According to the rules set out by the Commission on Presidential Debates and codified in a memorandum of understanding between both candidates, each candidate received two minutes to answer the question, followed by a two-minute rebuttal. The candidates often engaged each other during the rebuttal period, and Crowley also followed up with candidates.

Although moderator Crowley had intended to allow 15 voters to ask their questions, due to the length of candidate responses, 11 voters had time to ask questions of the candidates. Obama was asked 5 questions, and Romney was asked 6 questions. The questions were:

- To Romney, from a college student concerned about not being able to support himself after graduation
- To Obama, on the role of the Secretary of Energy in reducing gasoline prices
- To Romney, on his tax rate reduction plan and the potential of restricting or eliminating deductions and credits as a result
- To Obama, on inequalities between men and women in the workplace, specifically women earning less than men for the same work
- To Romney, on the differences between him and former president George W. Bush
- To Obama, on what he has done or accomplished to earn the questioner's vote in 2012
- To Romney, on his plans for immigrants without permanent residency in the United States
- To Obama, on who denied enhanced security prior to the attack on the U.S. diplomatic mission in Benghazi
- To Obama, on his accomplishments in reducing availability of assault weapons
- To Romney, on outsourcing and his plans on obtaining and retaining jobs in the United States
- To Romney, on the biggest misperceptions about him

=== Reception ===
A CNN poll of debate watchers found that 46% of respondents believed that Obama had done better, 39% believed that Romney had done better, and 11% had no opinion or believed they tied; CNN noted that the debate audience polled was about eight percentage points more Republican than the general population, similar to the vice presidential debate. A CBS poll of uncommitted voters found that 37% believed Obama was superior in the second debate, 30% said that Romney was superior, and 33% called the debate a tie. 55% of the voters CBS polled said that Obama gave direct answers, while 49% said this about Romney.

The consensus among liberals as well as some conservatives was that Obama's showing in the second debate was considerably stronger in comparison with his performance in the first debate. Analysts characterized him as more assertive and "tough" in the second debate. Romney was perceived to have not done as well as his previous performance, missing several opportunities to rebut Obama. In answer to a question about equal pay for women, Romney said that as Governor of Massachusetts, he had solicited "binders full of women" qualified to serve in his administration. His comment became an Internet meme and was parodied with pages on social networking sites. It was also adopted as a political attack line on Romney's attitude towards women issues. Women's groups, such as MassGAP, responded that they had approached Romney with suggestions for qualified candidates to have him commit to including more women. MassGAP stated they had done the same for his opponent. Commentators criticized him for appearing edgy, tense and irritable, off his game, and interrupting too much.

Polls conducted by CBS, CNN, and Reuters/Ipsos found a plurality felt Obama had done better than Romney, and a slight majority felt the same in a Gallup poll.

=== Please proceed, governor ===
The discussion of the 2012 Benghazi attack produced an exchange known for the phrase Please proceed, governor, later described by Frank Rich as hilarious, and covered by Jon Stewart at The Daily Show.

The candidates disagreed as to whether Obama declared the Libyan consular attack as terrorism the day after the event or, as Romney claimed, erroneously said it was a protest caused by an anti-Muslim video for two weeks before identifying it as a terrorist attack.

The end of that exchange was a comment by moderator Candy Crowley where she affirmed the facts of Obama's statement, referring to a transcript of his speech. Crowley said in part, during the debate, "He did call it an act of terror." In his Rose Garden closing remarks, the President had said in part, "No acts of terror will ever shake the resolve of this great nation."

== October 22: Third presidential debate (Lynn University) ==
Third presidential debate
- Date(s): October 22, 2012
- Duration: 90 minutes
- Venue: Lynn University
- Location: Boca Raton, Florida
- Participants: Barack Obama; Mitt Romney
- Moderator(s): Bob Schieffer of CBS

The third and final presidential debate took place on Monday, October 22, 2012, at Florida's Lynn University, and was moderated by Bob Schieffer of CBS. Topics discussed included the recent attack on the U.S. consulate in Benghazi, Libya, Iran's nuclear program, the Arab Spring, especially the Syrian civil war, relations with Israel, relations with Pakistan, the war on terror, the withdrawal of U.S. troops from Afghanistan, the withdrawal of United States troops from Iraq, the size and scope of the U.S. military, and relations and trade with China, as well as the rise of that nation. Governor Romney also briefly broached the subject of the ongoing insurgency in Mali. Although the debate was supposed to strictly concern only foreign policy, the candidates did manage to fit a few domestic policy issues, such as job creation, the federal deficit, and education into the discussion.

=== Format ===
The format of this debate was identical to that of the first debate. There were six 15-minute segments, with the moderator introducing a topic and giving each candidate two minutes to respond, before allowing the candidates to discuss the topics.

=== Reception ===
A CBS poll of uncommitted voters found that 53% believed that Obama won, 23% believed that Romney won, and 24% called the debate a tie. A CNN poll of debate watchers found that 48% of respondents called Obama the winner, 40% called Romney the winner, and 12% had no opinion or thought they tied; CNN noted that the debate audience polled was about five percentage points more Republican than the general population.

=== Moderation ===
Schieffer's moderation, which was perceived as confident but affable, received praise.

== Protests over excluded candidates ==
=== Lawsuit ===
Libertarian presidential nominee Gary Johnson and Green Party presidential nominee Jill Stein sued the Commission on Presidential Debates, the Republican National Committee and the Democratic National Committee, alleging that the commission's failure to extend them an invitation to the debates violated the Sherman Antitrust Act and the First Amendment. Johnson and Stein's suit was dismissed by the federal courts; the U.S. Court of Appeals for the D.C. Circuit ruled in 2017 that the two candidates lacked a valid legal claim or a cognizable injury.

=== Arrest of Green Party candidates outside second debate and lawsuit ===
On October 16, 2012, Green Party presidential nominee Jill Stein and vice-presidential nominee Cheri Honkala were arrested for disorderly conduct while trying to take part in the second presidential debate at Hofstra University in Hempstead, New York. The two women claim they were taken to a warehouse, and strapped for eight hours to chairs with plastic wrist restraints before being released.

=== Withdrawal of sponsors ===
Three of the debate sponsors dropped out ahead of the first presidential debate due to the exclusion of major third-party candidates. These companies were BBH New York, YWCA USA and Philips Electronics.

== Third party debates ==
Several third-party debates were held in 2012.

Third-party debates, 2012
N°	Date	Host	Location	Moderator(s)	Participants					
P Participant. N Non-invitee. A Absent invitee.					Democratic	Republican	Libertarian	Green	Constitution	Justice
P Participant. N Non-invitee. A Absent invitee.					President Barack Obama of Illinois	Former Governor Mitt Romney of Massachusetts	Former Governor Gary Johnson of New Mexico	Dr. Jill Stein of Massachusetts	Former Congressman Virgil Goode of Virginia	Former Mayor Rocky Anderson of Utah
D1	October 18, 2012	Google+ Hangout	Online	Stephen Peace of IVN.us	N	N	P	P	N	N
D2	October 23, 2012	Hilton Chicago	Chicago, Illinois	Larry King of Ora.TV; Free and Equal Elections Foundation (sponsor)	A	A	P	P	P	P
D3	November 4, 2012	Busboys and Poets	Washington, D.C.	Ralph Nader (Moderator & Sponsor)	N	N	P	P	P	P
D4	November 5, 2012	RT America	Washington, D.C.	Thom Hartmann of RT; Free and Equal Elections Foundation (sponsor)	N	N	P	P	N	N

=== October 18: IVN.us online presidential debate ===
IVN.us hosted an online presidential debate on October 18, 2012. It featured two third-party candidates, Gary Johnson and Jill Stein.

=== October 23: First Free and Equal Elections Foundation debate (Hilton Chicago) ===
The Free and Equal Elections Foundation organized a debate featuring third-party candidates Gary Johnson, Jill Stein, Virgil Goode and Rocky Anderson, which was held in Chicago at 9:00pm EDT on October 23, 2012. Veteran broadcaster Larry King of Ora.TV served as moderator for the debate, which was streamed live online. It was also streamed live by Ora.TV on YouTube and was broadcast live by C-SPAN, Link TV, Russia Today and Al Jazeera English.

==== Format ====
Each candidate was given an opportunity to make a two-minute opening statement. Then, six questions were asked to each of the four candidates and the candidates were given one minute to answer. However, the moderator accidentally started with the first question instead of allowing the candidates to do the opening statement. The opening statements had to follow their answers to the first question. The questions were:

- The candidates' thoughts on the top-two primary system
- How the candidates would tackle the war on drugs
- How the candidates would handle military spending and foreign policy
- Their opinions on section 1021 of the National Defense Authorization Act for Fiscal Year 2012
- The stance of the candidates on issues relating to the economy
- The constitutional amendment they would offer if they knew it would pass

==== Reception ====
The Free and Equal Elections Foundation conducted a post-debate poll to determine which candidates would progress to their second debate. The poll found 55% of viewers thought Johnson had done the best, 31% thought Stein had done the best, 8% had felt Anderson had done the best, and 6% had felt Goode had done the best. The second round of the instant run-off vote showed that the top two candidates were still Johnson and Stein; these candidates were allowed to progress to the second debate.

==== Moderation ====
The moderator Larry King received some criticism for his mishap at the beginning of the debate. Some commentators thought this showed the debate's irrelevance.

=== November 4: Ralph Nader presidential debate (Busboys and Poets) ===
Ralph Nader hosted and moderated a debate that took place on November 4, 2012, at Busboys and Poets in Washington, D.C., between 7:30 p.m. and 9:30 p.m. Gary Johnson, Virgil Goode, Rocky Anderson and Jill Stein participated.

=== November 5: Second Free and Equal Elections Foundation debate (RT America studio) ===
After the previous Free and Equal Elections Foundation debate, a second debate was announced, this time focusing on foreign policy. The debate was hosted by RT at the RT America Studio in Washington, D.C., and took place on November 5, 2012, between 9 p.m. and 10:30 p.m. It was initially to be held on October 30, 2012, but was delayed due to Hurricane Sandy. The candidates that participated were those that won the instant-runoff vote after the previous debate—Gary Johnson and Jill Stein.

== See also ==
- Barack Obama 2012 presidential campaign
- Mitt Romney 2012 presidential campaign
- 2012 United States presidential election
- The Rumble in the Air-Conditioned Auditorium
