= Binders full of women =

Phrase used by Mitt Romney in 2012

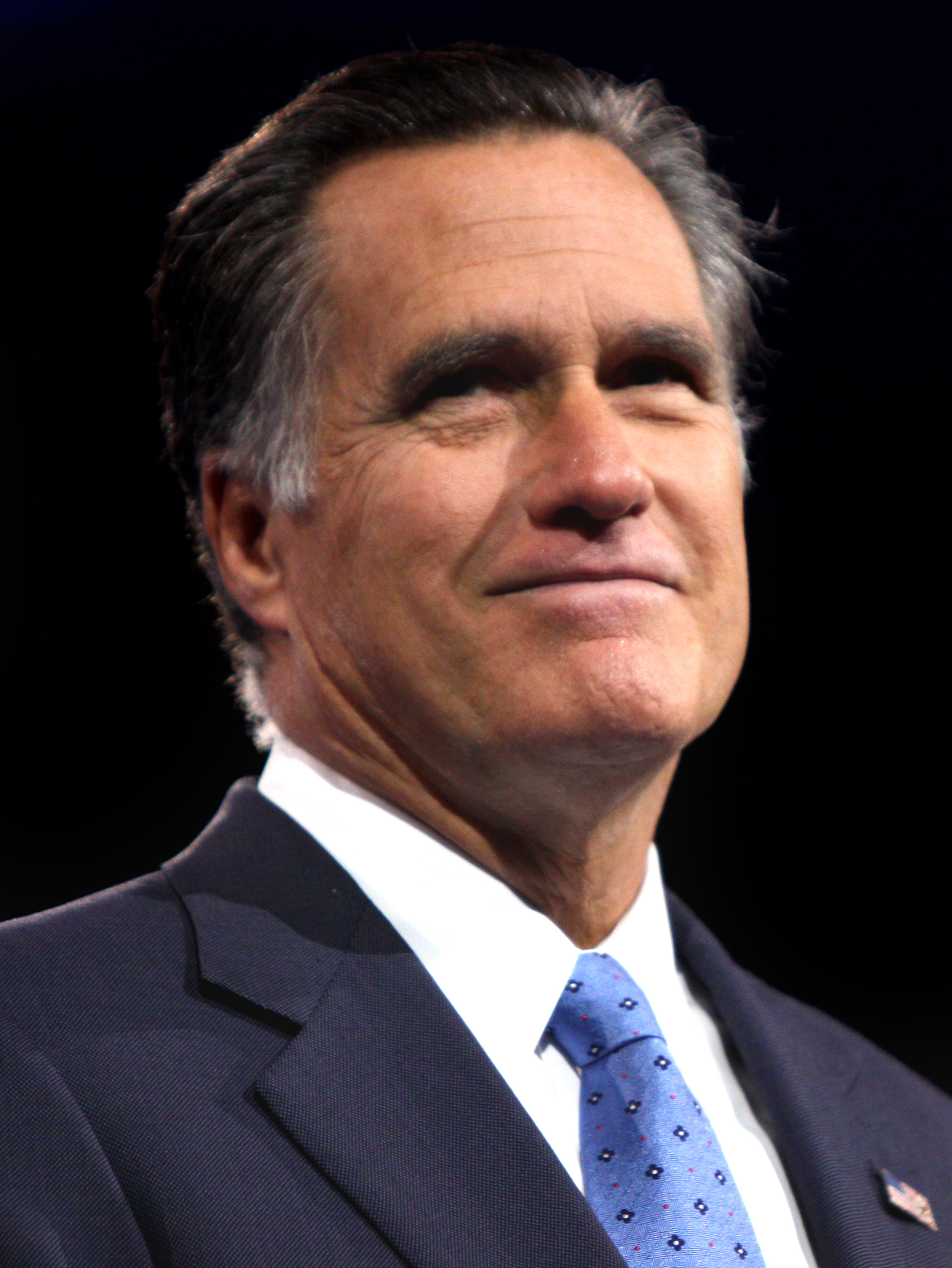
Mitt Romney, former Massachusetts governor and 2012 presidential nominee

"Binders full of women" is a phrase that was used by Mitt Romney on October 16, 2012, during the second U.S. presidential debate of 2012. Romney used the phrase in response to a question about pay equity, referring to ring binders with résumés of female job applicants submitted to him as governor of Massachusetts. The phrase was depicted by Romney's detractors and the Obama campaign as demeaning and insensitive toward women and was widely mocked. This prompted the phrase's use for political attacks on Romney's positions on "women's issues", as well as the development of an Internet meme.

The comment was cited as part of a larger accusation of tone deafness against Romney, along with his comments regarding women needing support so that they could get home each day to cook dinner for their families.

== Description ==
When asked about pay equity for women at the debate, Romney said:

I had the chance to pull together a cabinet, and all the applicants seemed to be men. [...] I went to a number of women's groups and said, "Can you help us find folks?" And they brought us whole binders full of women.

Even while the debate was ongoing, comedic commentary about the phrase had begun to be published online.

== Reactions ==
=== Internet meme ===
By the day after the debate, a Tumblr blog and posts had been creating illustrated commentary on the phrase, tweets and original works of art had been produced, and a Facebook page about "Binders Full of Women" had received 274,000 likes. Amazon.com received a barrage of satirical reviews for generic binders, with thousands of users marking the reviews as "helpful", moving them to the top of the review pages. A parody Twitter account that portrayed itself as a binder owned by Romney attracted 30,000 followers before the debate was even over.

At a campaign stop Barack Obama referenced the phrase: "I've got to tell you, we don't have to collect a bunch of binders to find qualified, talented, driven young women". The Washington Post stated that "Mitt Romney's 'binders full of women' comment during the second presidential debate did more than go viral; it put women's issues back in the campaign spotlight."

=== MassGAP response ===
Romney's statement that he was the one who initiated the recruitment of so many women was challenged by MassGAP, a coalition of women's groups affiliated with the Massachusetts Women's Political Caucus. The coalition issued a statement saying that they had approached the campaigns of both Romney and his opponent prior to the election to ask for a commitment to appoint more women to the Massachusetts government. The group compiled the names of female applicants and offered them to both Romney and his Democratic opponent Shannon O'Brien before the election.

== Legacy ==
On February 25, 2013, the game show Jeopardy! referenced the meme with a category titled "A Binder Full of Women". The clues were about famous or powerful women.

In 2017, a former Romney aide recovered the binders Romney was referring to and gave them to The Boston Globe. The two three-ring binders weighed 15 pounds, 6 ounces, and contained almost 200 résumés and cover letters.

Also in 2017, Charles C. W. Cooke of National Review criticized media coverage of the scandal, saying that "I am yet to hear an explanation of what was wrong with Romney's line that isn't wholly incoherent."

On June 5, 2019, the phrase "binders full of women" was spoken in Season 3, Episode 3 of the television show The Handmaid's Tale by the character Commander Lawrence, a commander in a totalitarian patriarchal theocracy.

== See also ==
- We finally beat Medicare
- Nasty woman
- 2012 United States presidential debates
