= Killing Crazy Horse =

2020 non-fiction book by Bill O'Reilly and Martin Dugard

- Author: Bill O'Reilly; Martin Dugard
- Language: English
- Subject: American Indian Wars, Crazy Horse
- Publisher: Henry Holt and Company
- Publication date: September 8, 2020
- Publication place: United States
- Media type: Hardcover
- Pages: 304
- ISBN: 978-1-62779-704-7
- Preceded by: Killing the SS
- Followed by: Killing the Mob

Killing Crazy Horse: The Merciless Indian Wars in America is a book written by Bill O'Reilly and Martin Dugard about clashes with Native Americans during the American Indian Wars of the 1800s. It is the ninth book in the Killing series, following Killing Lincoln, Killing Kennedy, Killing Jesus, Killing Patton, Killing Reagan, Killing the Rising Sun, Killing England and Killing the SS. The book was released on September 8, 2020.

== Synopsis ==
Killing Crazy Horse focuses on the American frontier during the 1800s and the clashes between settlers and Native Americans. O'Reilly and Dugard tell the story of American expansion out West through Native American warriors such as Crazy Horse, Sitting Bull, Chief Joseph, Cochise, Black Hawk and Red Cloud; U.S. Presidents Andrew Jackson and Ulysses S. Grant; and General George Armstrong Custer leading up to his encounter with Crazy Horse at the Battle of the Little Bighorn.

== Reception ==
Killing Crazy Horse spent 10 weeks on the New York Times Top 10 Best Sellers Combined Print & E-Book Nonfiction list and 15 weeks on the Top 10 Best Sellers Hardcover Nonfiction list.
