= Killing the SS =

2018 book by Bill O'Reilly and Martin Dugard

- First edition
- Author: Bill O'Reilly; Martin Dugard
- Language: English
- Subject: Nazi hunters, Schutzstaffel
- Publisher: Henry Holt and Company
- Publication date: October 9, 2018
- Publication place: United States
- Media type: Hardcover
- Pages: 320
- ISBN: 978-1-25016-554-1
- Preceded by: Killing England
- Followed by: Killing Crazy Horse

Killing the SS: The Hunt for the Worst War Criminals in History is a book written by Bill O'Reilly and Martin Dugard about hunting Nazi war criminals after World War II. It is the eighth book in the Killing series, following Killing Lincoln, Killing Kennedy, Killing Jesus, Killing Patton, Killing Reagan, Killing the Rising Sun, and Killing England. The book was released on October 9, 2018.

== Synopsis ==
Killing the SS focuses on the hunt for Nazi war criminals, who escaped capture after World War II, and bringing them to justice. The main focus is on war criminals Josef Mengele, the physician who conducted medical experiments at Auschwitz concentration camp; Martin Bormann, Adolf Hitler's personal secretary; Klaus Barbie, known as the "Butcher of Lyon"; and Adolf Eichmann, one of the major organizers of the Holocaust. Other former SS members include, Obersturmbannführer Otto Skorzeny and Elfriede Rinkel, who was a guard at Ravensbrück, the Nazis' largest concentration camp for women.

== Reception ==
USA Today gave the book two out of four stars and said, "There's nothing particularly new here about the search for Adolf Hitler's most notorious henchmen and women," but, it'll "no doubt, be a welcome addition to the best-selling series."

As of October 22, 2018, Killing the SS was among Amazon's best sellers and at number one on the New York Times list of best-selling nonfiction. It also held the number one spot on the New York Times Combined Print & E-Book Nonfiction list.
