= Killing England =

Book by Bill O'Reilly and Martin Dugard

- Author: Bill O'Reilly; Martin Dugard
- Language: English
- Subject: American Revolution
- Publisher: Henry Holt and Company
- Publication date: September 19, 2017
- Publication place: United States
- Media type: Hardcover
- Pages: 336
- ISBN: 978-1-62779-064-2
- Preceded by: Killing the Rising Sun
- Followed by: Killing the SS

Killing England: The Brutal Struggle for Independence is a book written by Bill O'Reilly and Martin Dugard about the American Revolution. It is the seventh book in the Killing series, following Killing Lincoln, Killing Kennedy, Killing Jesus, Killing Patton, Killing Reagan, and Killing the Rising Sun. The book was released on September 19, 2017.

== Synopsis ==
In Killing England the authors tell the story of the American Revolution through the eyes of George Washington, Benjamin Franklin, Thomas Jefferson, and Great Britain's King George III. O'Reilly and Dugard also focus on major battles such as Bunker Hill, Long Island, Saratoga and Yorktown.

== Sales ==
Initial sales of Bill O'Reilly and Martin Dugard's seventh book in their Killing series struggled in comparison to the other books in the series. Killing England sold just under 65,000 hardcover copies in its initial week on sale. Killing the Rising Sun (2016) sold over 144,000 copies in its first week, while Killing Reagan (2015) sold 112,000 copies. Killing Patton (2014) drew the most buyers to the series with over 163,000 copies sold.
