= Killing Jesus (2015 film) =

American television film

- Promotional poster
- Genre: Docudrama; Biography
- Based on: Killing Jesus by Bill O'Reilly and Martin Dugard
- Written by: Walon Green
- Directed by: Christopher Menaul
- Starring: Haaz Sleiman; Kelsey Grammer; Stephen Moyer; Emmanuelle Chriqui; John Rhys-Davies
- Theme music composer: Trevor Morris
- Country of origin: United States
- Original language: English

Production
- Producers: Ridley Scott; David W. Zucker; Mary Lisio; Teri Weinberg; Mark Huffam
- Cinematography: Ousama Rawi
- Editor: Xavier Russell
- Running time: 132 minutes
- Production company: Scott Free Productions

Original release
- Network: National Geographic Channel
- Release: March 29, 2015

Killing Jesus is an American television film inspired by the 2013 book of the same title by Bill O'Reilly and Martin Dugard. This is National Geographic's third installment of television adaptations of O'Reilly's non-fiction books, which include Killing Lincoln and Killing Kennedy. The cast includes Haaz Sleiman, Kelsey Grammer, Stephen Moyer, Emmanuelle Chriqui, and John Rhys-Davies.

It debuted on the National Geographic Channel on March 29, 2015.

== Premise ==
The film chronicles the life of Jesus of Nazareth through the retelling of the political, social, and historical conflicts during the Roman Empire that ultimately led to his crucifixion.

== Cast ==
- Haaz Sleiman as Jesus
- Alexis Rodney as Peter
- Joe Doyle as Judas Iscariot
- Aneurin Barnard as James
- Abhin Galeya as John the Baptist
- Rufus Sewell as Caiaphas
- John Lynch as Nicodemus
- John Rhys-Davies as Annas
- Stephen Moyer as Pontius Pilate
- Tamsin Egerton as Claudia
- Kelsey Grammer as Herod the Great
- Eoin Macken as Herod Antipas
- Emmanuelle Chriqui as Herodias
- Stephanie Leonidas as Salome
- Vernon Dobtcheff as Isaiah
- Klára Issová as Mary Magdalene
- Mehdi Pyro as Andrew

== Development ==
In March 2014, it was announced Killing Jesus was being adapted into a four-hour miniseries, and Walon Green has been tapped to write and executive produce the project. Also returning as executive producers are Ridley Scott, David W. Zucker, and Mary Lisio, who previously produced Killing Kennedy. In August 2014, Christopher Menaul was attached to direct the miniseries.

== Reception ==
The review aggregation website Rotten Tomatoes gave the series a 43% approval rating based on 7 reviews, with an average rating of 5.70/10.

=== Viewership ===
On its premiere airing, the film was watched by 3.7 million viewers, averaging a 1.0 rating among adults in the 25-54 demographic. The viewership surpassed the record previously held by Killing Kennedy.

=== Accolades ===
Year	Association	Category	Nominee(s)	Result
2015	Critics' Choice Television Awards	Best Movie/Miniseries	Killing Jesus	Nominated
2015	Primetime Emmy Awards	Outstanding Television Movie	Killing Jesus	Nominated
2016	Satellite Awards	Best Miniseries or Television Film	Killing Jesus	Nominated

== See also ==
- List of Easter films
