= List of The New York Times number-one books of 2016 =

The American daily newspaper The New York Times publishes multiple weekly lists ranking the best-selling books in the United States. The lists are split into three genres—fiction, nonfiction and children's books. Both the fiction and nonfiction lists are further split into multiple lists.

== Fiction ==
The following list ranks the number-one best-selling fiction books, in the combined print and e-books category. The most frequent weekly best seller of the year was The Girl on the Train by Paula Hawkins with 10 weeks at the top of the list, followed by Me Before You by Jojo Moyes with 7 weeks.

Date	Book	Author
January 3	Rogue Lawyer	John Grisham
January 10	Rogue Lawyer	John Grisham
January 17	The Girl on the Train	Paula Hawkins
January 24	The Girl on the Train	Paula Hawkins
January 31	Scandalous Behavior	Stuart Woods
February 7	Blue	Danielle Steel
February 14	NYPD Red 4	James Patterson and Marshall Karp
February 21	Brotherhood In Death	J. D. Robb
February 28	Morning Star	Pierce Brown
March 6	Cometh the Hour	Jeffrey Archer
March 13	Me Before You	Jojo Moyes
March 20	The Gangster	Clive Cussler and Justin Scott
March 27	Fire Touched	Patricia Briggs
April 3	Private Paris	James Patterson and Mark Sullivan
April 10	Fool Me Once	Harlan Coben
April 17	Fool Me Once	Harlan Coben
April 24	One with You	Sylvia Day
May 1	The Obsession	Nora Roberts
May 8	The Last Mile	David Baldacci
May 15	Extreme Prey	John Sandford
May 22	15th Affair	James Patterson and Maxine Paetro
May 29	Me Before You	Jojo Moyes
June 5	Me Before You	Jojo Moyes
June 12	Me Before You	Jojo Moyes
June 19	Me Before You	Jojo Moyes
June 26	End of Watch	Stephen King
July 3	Bay of Sighs	Nora Roberts
July 10	Me Before You	Jojo Moyes
July 17	The Games	James Patterson and Mark Sullivan
July 24	Me Before You	Jojo Moyes
July 31	The Black Widow	Daniel Silva
August 7	The Girl on the Train	Paula Hawkins
August 14	Truly Madly Guilty	Liane Moriarty
August 21	Bullseye	James Patterson and Michael Ledwidge
August 28	Insidious	Catherine Coulter
September 4	The Girl on the Train	Paula Hawkins
September 11	The Girl on the Train	Paula Hawkins
September 18	A Great Reckoning	Louise Penny
September 25	Apprentice in Death	J. D. Robb
October 2	The Girl on the Train	Paula Hawkins
October 9	The Girl on the Train	Paula Hawkins
October 16	The Girl on the Train	Paula Hawkins
October 23	The Girl on the Train	Paula Hawkins
October 30	The Girl on the Train	Paula Hawkins
November 6	Escape Clause	John Sandford
November 13	The Whistler	John Grisham
November 20	The Wrong Side of Goodbye	Michael Connelly
November 27	Night School	Lee Child
December 4	Turbo Twenty-Three	Janet Evanovich
December 11	Cross the Line	James Patterson
December 18	The Whistler	John Grisham
December 25	Island of Glass	Nora Roberts

== Nonfiction ==
The following list ranks the number-one best-selling nonfiction books, in the combined print and e-books category. The most frequent weekly best seller of the year was When Breath Becomes Air by Paul Kalanithi with 13 weeks at the top of the list, followed by Killing the Rising Sun with nine weeks.

Date	Book	Author	Publisher
January 3	Killing Reagan	Bill O'Reilly and Martin Dugard	Holt
January 10	Killing Reagan	Bill O'Reilly and Martin Dugard	Holt
January 17	Not My Father's Son: A Memoir	Alan Cumming	Dey Street
January 24	Between the World and Me	Ta-Nehisi Coates	Spiegel & Grau
January 31	When Breath Becomes Air	Paul Kalanithi	Random House
February 7	When Breath Becomes Air	Paul Kalanithi	Random House
February 14	When Breath Becomes Air	Paul Kalanithi	Random House
February 21	When Breath Becomes Air	Paul Kalanithi	Random House
February 28	When Breath Becomes Air	Paul Kalanithi	Random House
March 6	When Breath Becomes Air	Paul Kalanithi	Random House
March 13	When Breath Becomes Air	Paul Kalanithi	Random House
March 20	When Breath Becomes Air	Paul Kalanithi	Random House
March 27	When Breath Becomes Air	Paul Kalanithi	Random House
April 3	When Breath Becomes Air	Paul Kalanithi	Random House
April 10	When Breath Becomes Air	Paul Kalanithi	Random House
April 17	When Breath Becomes Air	Paul Kalanithi	Random House
April 24	The Rainbow Comes and Goes	Anderson Cooper and Gloria Vanderbilt	Harper
May 1	Hamilton: The Revolution	Lin-Manuel Miranda and Jeremy McCarter	Grand Central Publishing
May 8	The Rainbow Comes and Goes	Anderson Cooper and Gloria Vanderbilt	Harper
May 15	The Rainbow Comes and Goes	Anderson Cooper and Gloria Vanderbilt	Harper
May 22	The Rainbow Comes and Goes	Anderson Cooper and Gloria Vanderbilt	Harper
May 29	Hamilton: The Revolution	Lin-Manuel Miranda and Jeremy McCarter	Grand Central Publishing
June 5	The Gene: An Intimate History	Siddhartha Mukherjee	Charles Scribner's Sons
June 12	When Breath Becomes Air	Paul Kalanithi	Random House
June 19	Bill O'Relly's Legends and Lies: The Patriots	David Fisher	Holt
June 26	Bill O'Relly's Legends and Lies: The Patriots	David Fisher	Holt
July 3	Bill O'Relly's Legends and Lies: The Patriots	David Fisher	Holt
July 10	Alexander Hamilton	Ron Chernow	Penguin
July 17	Crisis of Character	Gary J. Byrne with Grant M. Schmidt	Center Street
July 24	Crisis of Character	Gary J. Byrne with Grant M. Schmidt	Center Street
July 31	Crisis of Character	Gary J. Byrne with Grant M. Schmidt	Center Street
August 7	It Gets Worse: A Collection of Essays	Shane Dawson	Keywords Press/Atria
August 14	Crisis of Character	Gary J. Byrne with Grant M. Schmidt	Center Street
August 21	Hillary's America	Dinesh D'Souza	Regnery
August 28	Hillbilly Elegy	JD Vance	HarperCollins
September 4	The Girl with the Lower Back Tattoo	Amy Schumer	Gallery Books
September 11	The Girl with the Lower Back Tattoo	Amy Schumer	Gallery Books
September 18	The Girl with the Lower Back Tattoo	Amy Schumer	Gallery Books
September 25	Love Warrior	Glennon Doyle Melton	Flatiron Books
October 2	Killing the Rising Sun	Bill O'Reilly and Martin Dugard	Holt
October 9	Killing the Rising Sun	Bill O'Reilly and Martin Dugard	Holt
October 16	Born to Run	Bruce Springsteen	Simon & Schuster
October 23	Killing the Rising Sun	Bill O'Reilly and Martin Dugard	Holt
October 30	Killing the Rising Sun	Bill O'Reilly and Martin Dugard	Holt
November 6	The Magnolia Story	Chip Gaines and Joanna Gaines with Mark Dagostino	W Publishing/Thomas Nelson
November 13	Killing the Rising Sun	Bill O'Reilly and Martin Dugard	Holt
November 20	Killing the Rising Sun	Bill O'Reilly and Martin Dugard	Holt
November 27	Killing the Rising Sun	Bill O'Reilly and Martin Dugard	Holt
December 4	Settle for More	Megyn Kelly	Harper/HarperCollins
December 11	Killing the Rising Sun	Bill O'Reilly and Martin Dugard	Holt
December 18	The Magnolia Story	Chip Gaines and Joanna Gaines with Mark Dagostino	W Publishing/Thomas Nelson
December 25	Killing the Rising Sun	Bill O'Reilly and Martin Dugard	Holt

== See also ==
- Publishers Weekly list of bestselling novels in the United States in the 2010s
