= David Zucker (disambiguation) =

David Zucker is an American film director, producer, and screenwriter.

David Zucker may also refer to:

- David Zucker (ice hockey) (born 1987), Czech ice hockey player
- David Zucker (politician) (born 1948), Israeli peace activist and former politician
- David W. Zucker, American television producer

== See also ==
- David Zuckerman (disambiguation)
