= List of The New York Times number-one books of 2018 =

The American daily newspaper The New York Times publishes multiple weekly lists ranking the best-selling books in the United States. The lists are split into three genres—fiction, nonfiction and children's books. Both the fiction and nonfiction lists are further split into multiple lists.

== Fiction ==
The following list ranks the number-one best-selling fiction books, in the combined print and e-books category.

The most frequent weekly best seller of the year was The President Is Missing by James Patterson and Bill Clinton with 6 weeks at the top of the list, followed closely by The Great Alone by Kristin Hannah with 4 weeks.

| Date | Book | Author |
|---|---|---|
| January 7 | Origin | Dan Brown |
| January 14 | The People vs. Alex Cross | James Patterson |
| January 21 | The Woman in the Window | A. J. Finn |
| January 28 | The Woman in the Window | A. J. Finn |
| February 4 | City of Endless Night | Douglas Preston and Lincoln Child |
| February 11 | Judgment Road | Christine Feehan |
| February 18 | Dark in Death | J.D. Robb |
| February 25 | The Great Alone | Kristin Hannah |
| March 4 | The Great Alone | Kristin Hannah |
| March 11 | The Great Alone | Kristin Hannah |
| March 18 | The Great Alone | Kristin Hannah |
| March 25 | Burn Bright | Patricia Briggs |
| April 1 | The Rising Sea | Clive Cussler and Graham Brown |
| April 8 | Accidental Heroes | Danielle Steel |
| April 15 | The Disappeared | C. J. Box |
| April 22 | Ready Player One | Ernest Cline |
| April 29 | The Thief | J. R. Ward |
| May 6 | The Fallen | David Baldacci |
| May 13 | Twisted Prey | John Sandford |
| May 20 | The 17th Suspect | James Patterson and Maxine Paetro |
| May 27 | The 17th Suspect | James Patterson and Maxine Paetro |
| June 3 | The Cast | Danielle Steel |
| June 10 | The Outsider | Stephen King |
| June 17 | Shelter in Place | Nora Roberts |
| June 24 | The President Is Missing | James Patterson and Bill Clinton |
| July 1 | The President Is Missing | James Patterson and Bill Clinton |
| July 8 | The President Is Missing | James Patterson and Bill Clinton |
| July 15 | The President Is Missing | James Patterson and Bill Clinton |
| July 22 | The President Is Missing | James Patterson and Bill Clinton |
| July 29 | The President Is Missing | James Patterson and Bill Clinton |
| August 5 | The Other Woman | Daniel Silva |
| August 12 | Origin | Dan Brown |
| August 19 | Origin | Dan Brown |
| August 26 | Tailspin | Sandra Brown |
| September 2 | Crazy Rich Asians | Kevin Kwan |
| September 9 | Crazy Rich Asians | Kevin Kwan |
| September 16 | Crazy Rich Asians | Kevin Kwan |
| September 23 | Leverage in Death | J. D. Robb |
| September 30 | Juror #3 | James Patterson and Nancy Allen |
| October 7 | Lethal White | Robert Galbraith |
| October 14 | Vince Flynn: Red War | Kyle Mills |
| October 21 | A Spark of Light | Jodi Picoult |
| October 28 | Holy Ghost | John Sandford |
| November 4 | Every Breath | Nicholas Sparks |
| November 11 | The Reckoning | John Grisham |
| November 18 | Dark Sacred Night | Michael Connelly |
| November 25 | Past Tense | Lee Child |
| December 2 | Look Alive Twenty-Five | Janet Evanovich |
| December 9 | Fire and Blood | George R. R. Martin |
| December 16 | Kingdom of the Blind | Louise Penny |
| December 23 | Of Blood and Bone | Nora Roberts |
| December 30 | The Reckoning | John Grisham |

== Nonfiction ==
The following list ranks the number-one best-selling nonfiction books, in the combined print and e-books category. The most frequent weekly best seller of the year was Fire and Fury by Michael Wolff with seven weeks at the top of the list followed by Becoming by Michelle Obama with five weeks at the top of the list; this book continued to be a best seller in 2019.

| Date | Book | Author | Publisher |
|---|---|---|---|
| January 7 | Grant | Ron Chernow | Penguin Press |
| January 14 | Astrophysics for People in a Hurry | Neil deGrasse Tyson | Norton |
| January 21 | Fire and Fury | Michael Wolff | Holt |
| January 28 | Fire and Fury | Michael Wolff | Holt |
| February 4 | Fire and Fury | Michael Wolff | Holt |
| February 11 | Fire and Fury | Michael Wolff | Holt |
| February 18 | Fire and Fury | Michael Wolff | Holt |
| February 25 | Fire and Fury | Michael Wolff | Holt |
| March 4 | Fire and Fury | Michael Wolff | Holt |
| March 11 | Educated | Tara Westover | Random House |
| March 18 | I'll Be Gone in the Dark | Michelle McNamara | Harper |
| March 25 | I'll Be Gone in the Dark | Michelle McNamara | Harper |
| April 1 | Russian Roulette | Michael Isikoff and David Corn | Twelve |
| April 8 | Secret Empires | Peter Schweizer | Harper |
| April 15 | This Is Me | Chrissy Metz | Dey St. |
| April 22 | Killers of the Flower Moon | David Grann | Doubleday |
| April 29 | Fascism: A Warning | Madeleine Albright and Bill Woodward | Harper |
| May 6 | A Higher Loyalty | James Comey | Flatiron |
| May 13 | A Higher Loyalty | James Comey | Flatiron |
| May 27 | The Soul of America | Jon Meacham | Random House |
| June 3 | How to Change Your Mind | Michael Pollan | Penguin Press |
| June 10 | The Restless Wave | John McCain and Mark Salter | Simon & Schuster |
| June 17 | Calypso | David Sedaris | Little, Brown |
| June 24 | Kitchen Confidential | Anthony Bourdain | Ecco |
| July 1 | Kitchen Confidential | Anthony Bourdain | Ecco |
| July 8 | Kitchen Confidential | Anthony Bourdain | Ecco |
| July 15 | Kitchen Confidential | Anthony Bourdain | Ecco |
| July 22 | Things That Matter | Charles Krauthammer | Crown Forum |
| July 29 | Educated | Tara Westover | Random House |
| August 5 | Liars, Leakers and Liberals | Jeanine Pirro | Center Street |
| August 12 | The Russia Hoax | Gregg Jarrett | Broadside |
| August 19 | The Russia Hoax | Gregg Jarrett | Broadside |
| August 26 | Everything Trump Touches Dies | Rick Wilson | Free Press |
| September 2 | Unhinged | Omarosa Manigault Newman | Gallery |
| September 9 | Educated | Tara Westover | Random House |
| September 16 | The Restless Wave | John McCain and Mark Salter | Simon & Schuster |
| September 23 | Sapiens | Yuval Noah Harari | Harper |
| September 30 | Fear: Trump in the White House | Bob Woodward | Simon & Schuster |
| October 7 | Fear: Trump in the White House | Bob Woodward | Simon & Schuster |
| October 14 | Fear: Trump in the White House | Bob Woodward | Simon & Schuster |
| October 21 | Ship of Fools | Tucker Carlson | Free Press |
| October 28 | Killing the SS | Bill O'Reilly and Martin Dugard | Holt |
| November 4 | Killing the SS | Bill O'Reilly and Martin Dugard | Holt |
| November 11 | Killing the SS | Bill O'Reilly and Martin Dugard | Holt |
| November 18 | Beastie Boys Book | Michael Diamond and Adam Horovitz | Spiegel & Grau |
| November 25 | Killing the SS | Bill O'Reilly and Martin Dugard | Holt |
| December 2 | Becoming | Michelle Obama | Crown |
| December 9 | Becoming | Michelle Obama | Crown |
| December 16 | Becoming | Michelle Obama | Crown |
| December 23 | Becoming | Michelle Obama | Crown |
| December 30 | Becoming | Michelle Obama | Crown |

== See also ==
- Publishers Weekly list of bestselling novels in the United States in the 2010s
