= Killing Reagan (film) =

2016 US drama film

- Television release poster
- Based on: Killing Reagan by Bill O'Reilly; Martin Dugard
- Screenplay by: Eric Simonson
- Directed by: Rod Lurie
- Starring: Tim Matheson; Cynthia Nixon; Joe Chrest; Joel Murray; Kyle S. More; Michael H. Cole
- Composer: David Buckley
- Country of origin: United States
- Original language: English

Production
- Producer: Diane L. Sabatini
- Editor: Christal Khatib
- Running time: 100 minutes
- Production company: Scott Free Productions

Original release
- Network: National Geographic Channel
- Release: October 16, 2016

Killing Reagan is a 2016 American television drama film directed by Rod Lurie and written by Eric Simonson. It is based on the 2015 book of the same name by Bill O'Reilly and Martin Dugard. The film stars Tim Matheson, Cynthia Nixon, Joe Chrest, Joel Murray, Kyle S. More, and Michael H. Cole. The film premiered on October 16, 2016, on the National Geographic Channel.

== Plot ==
The film opens at a Jimmy Carter re-election campaign rally in Nashville, Tennessee.

William Casey is serving as Reagan's campaign manager in 1980.

Reagan's would-be assassin, John Hinckley, is seen purchasing a Röhm gun. On October 28, 1980, Reagan and Carter debate in Cleveland, Ohio. Later, Hinckley hears about the assassination of John Lennon and develops a fascination with Mark David Chapman.

After Ronald Reagan recovers from the assassination attempt, Nancy Reagan hires the astrologer Joan Quigley.

== Cast ==
- Tim Matheson as Ronald Reagan
- Cynthia Nixon as Nancy Reagan
- Jeff Harlan as Michael Deaver
- Joe Chrest as Jerry Parr
- Joel Murray as Edwin Meese
- Kyle S. More as John Hinckley Jr.
- Michael H. Cole as James Brady
- Geoff Pierson as James Baker
- Patrick St. Esprit as Alexander Haig
- Ashley LeConte Campbell as Jim Baker's Secretary
- Gary Weeks as Stephen Colo
- Mike Pniewski as Jack Hinckley
- Leander Suleiman as Dr. Joyce Mitchell
- Rebecca Tilney as Jo Ann Hinckley
- Kristen Shaw as Cheryl Chris
- James Martin Kelly as Donald Regan
- Daniel Thomas May as David Stockman
- Jason Vail as Dennis McCarthy
- Kendrick Cross as Danny Spriggs
- Katia Lara as Jodie Foster
- Bill Winkler as Caspar Weinberger
- Dustin Lewis as Ted Graber
- Jeff Rose as George Opfer
- Anthony Collins as Dr. F Fagan
- Amber Erwin as Katie
- Keith Hudson as Rocky
- John L. Smith Jr. as Jimmy Carter
- David Alexander as George Chmiel
- Brian F. Durkin as Detective Eddie Myers
- Jim Dougherty as Judge William Higgins
- Tom Hillmann as Dr. Joseph Giordano
- Joseph Lacy as Ray Shaddick
- Chris Hlozek as Robert Wanko
- David A. MacDonald as Tim McCarthy
- Sue Cremin as Nurse Wendy Koenig
- Annie Humphrey as Sarah Brady
- Trey McGriff as David C. Fischer
- Darian Fisher as Kent Wood

== Production ==
On September 22, 2015, the National Geographic Channel and Scott Free Productions acquired rights to the book Killing Reagan. On May 6, 2016, Tim Matheson and Cynthia Nixon joined the cast to play Ronald Reagan and Nancy Reagan.

== Reception ==
Killing Reagan has a 63% rating on the Rotten Tomatoes review aggregator.

The Hollywood Reporter said the film was the best of the "Killing" adaptations to date, but said the film "doesn’t exactly know where to begin and runs out of energy in the aftermath of Reagan’s recovery from a killing that didn’t occur." A review in People magazine said that Matheson "captures the essence of the Reagan persona" but that "Cynthia Nixon’s Nancy is rather pointedly lacking in depth."

== Accolades ==
Killing Reagan received three Critics' Choice Television Award nominations for its seventh annual awards.

Year	Association	Category	Nominee(s)	Result
2017	Critics' Choice Television Awards	Best Actor in a Movie or Limited Series	Tim Matheson	Nominated
2017	Critics' Choice Television Awards	Best Actress in a Movie or Limited Series	Cynthia Nixon	Nominated
2017	Critics' Choice Television Awards	Best Movie or Limited Series	Killing Reagan	Nominated
