= Billy Campbell =

American actor (born 1959)

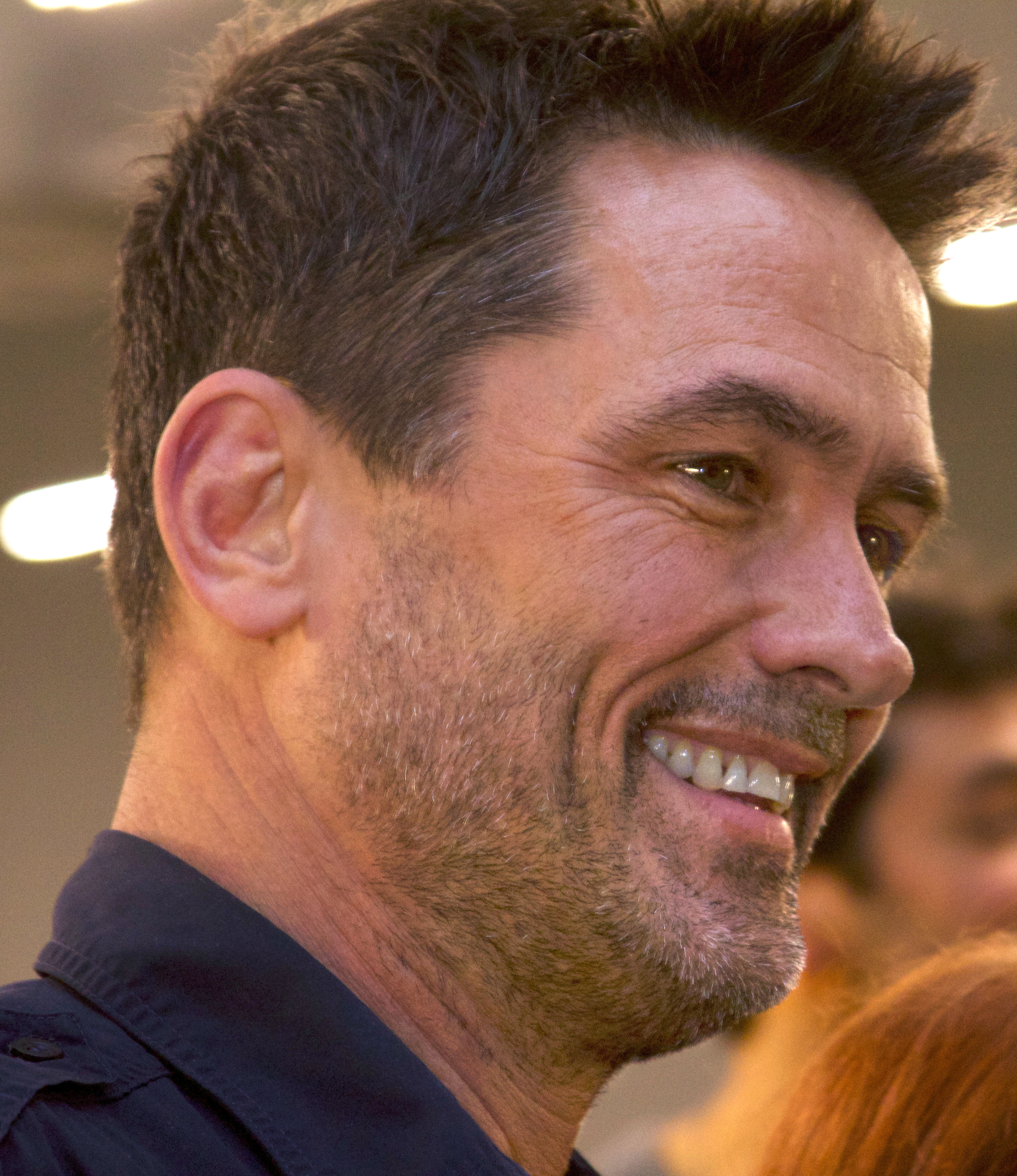
- Campbell in 2013
- Born: William Oliver Campbell; July 7, 1959 (age 67); Charlottesville, Virginia, U.S.
- Other names: William Campbell; Ollie Campbell
- Occupation: Actor
- Years active: 1981–present
- Spouse: Anne Campbell
- Children: 2

William Oliver Campbell (born July 7, 1959) is an American film and television actor. He first gained recognition for his recurring role as Luke Fuller on the television series Dynasty, and as the titular character Cliff Secord / The Rocketeer in the superhero film The Rocketeer (1991). He then starred as Rick Sammler on Once and Again (1999–2002), earning a Golden Globe Award nomination for Best Actor – Television Series Drama.

He also portrayed Det. Joey Indelli on Crime Story (1986–88), Dr. Jon Fielding on the miniseries Tales of the City (1993) and its sequels, Darren Richmond on The Killing (2011–13), and Dr. Alan Farragut on Helix (2014–15). Campbell starred as Det. John Cardinal on the Canadian CTV series Cardinal, for which he won three Canadian Screen Awards. He is also known for his film roles in Bram Stoker's Dracula (1992), Gettysburg (1993) and Enough (2002).

== Early life ==
Campbell was born on July 7, 1959, in Charlottesville, Virginia. He attended Fork Union Military Academy, Western Albemarle High School and New Trier East High School. His parents divorced when he was very young. He moved to Chicago to study at the American Academy of Art College, but instead chose to pursue acting as a profession, taking classes at the Ted Liss Studio and the Second City Training Center.

== Career ==
After appearances in single episodes of Hotel and the hit 1980s sitcom Family Ties, Campbell's first lead role was that of Luke Fuller, Steven Carrington's lover on the fifth season of Dynasty––then the number one show on American television. Following this, he had a regular role as Detective Joey Indelli on the 1986–88 NBC series Crime Story. Campbell was the first choice of the producers of Star Trek: The Next Generation to play the role of William Riker, but lost the role to Jonathan Frakes due to the intervention of Paramount Television head John Pike. Campbell appeared as a guest star during the show's second season, portraying the title character in "The Outrageous Okona".

In 1991, Campbell played the titular role in The Rocketeer opposite Jennifer Connelly. He went on to appear as Quincey Morris, a Texan vampire hunter in Bram Stoker's Dracula (1992). In 1993, he starred in the short-lived detective series Moon over Miami. That same year, he was seen in the role of Dr. Jon Fielding in the television adaptation of Tales of the City. He appeared in the sequels More Tales of the City in 1998, and Further Tales of the City in 2001.

In 1999, Campbell began his role as Rick Sammler on Once and Again, opposite Sela Ward. The series ran for three seasons until 2002, during which time Campbell received a Golden Globe nomination for Best Actor in a Dramatic Series. Campbell then had a regular role as Jordan Collier on the sci-fi series The 4400, which aired for four seasons on the USA Network between 2004 and 2007. In 2005, he had a recurring role in the teen soap The O.C.

After his role in the 2002 film Enough, in which he played an abusive husband to Jennifer Lopez's character, he portrayed serial killer Ted Bundy in the 2003 television film The Stranger Beside Me. He then played a college professor accused of raping a student in a 2004 episode of Law & Order: Special Victims Unit, and also played an accused serial killer who defends himself in the 2007 television series Shark.

In 2010, Campbell had a recurring role in the short-lived revival of Melrose Place. Following this, Campbell took a prominent role in the AMC series The Killing, an American remake of the Danish series of the same name. In 2000, Campbell was named one of the "World's 50 Most Beautiful People" by People magazine. In 2013, he played Abraham Lincoln in the National Geographic television adaptation of the Bill O'Reilly/Martin Dugard book, Killing Lincoln.

From 2017 to 2020, he starred in the Canadian television drama series Cardinal, for which he won the Canadian Screen Award for Best Actor in a Limited Series or Television Film at the 6th Canadian Screen Awards in 2018, the 7th Canadian Screen Awards in 2019 and the 8th Canadian Screen Awards in 2020.

In 2024, he joined the 2025 reboot of I Know What You Did Last Summer.

== Personal life ==
Campbell was engaged to Jennifer Connelly, his The Rocketeer love interest, from 1991 until 1996. He lives with his wife, Anne, and their two children on her family's farm in Moss, Norway.

Campbell holds permanent resident status in Canada, and lived for several years in Vancouver, British Columbia.

Campbell is a rugby enthusiast, having played for the Virginia Rugby Football Club, Chicago Lions RFC and the Santa Monica Rugby Club.

== Filmography ==
=== Film ===
| Year | Title | Role | Notes |
|---|---|---|---|
| 1989 | Call from Space | Young Man | Short film |
| 1990 | Checkered Flag | Tommy Trehearn | TV movie aired on ABC |
| 1991 | The Rocketeer | Cliff Secord / The Rocketeer | |
| 1992 | Bram Stoker's Dracula | Quincey Morris | |
| 1993 | The Night We Never Met | Shep | |
| 1993 | Gettysburg | Lt. Andrew Lewis Pitzer | |
| 1994 | Dickwad | Chet | Short film |
| 1995 | Under the Hula Moon | Marvin | |
| 1995 | Out There | Delbert Mosley | |
| 1996 | Lover's Knot | Steve Hunter | |
| 1997 | Elissa | Will | Short film |
| 1997 | Menno's Mind | Menno | |
| 1997 | The Second Jungle Book: Mowgli & Baloo | Harrison | |
| 1997 | Last Chance Love | Robert | |
| 1998 | The Brylcreem Boys | Miles Keogh | |
| 2001 | The Rising Place | Streete Wilder | |
| 2002 | Enough | Mitch Hiller | |
| 2003 | Gods and Generals | Maj. Gen. George Pickett | |
| 2008 | Ghost Town | Richard | |
| 2010 | Almost Kings | Ron | |
| 2012 | Fat Kid Rules the World | Mr. Billings | |
| 2012 | The Disappeared | Mannie | |
| 2013 | Copperhead | Abner Beech | |
| 2014 | Red Knot | Capt. Emerson | |
| 2014 | The Scribbler | Sinclair | |
| 2014 | Operation Rogue | Military Newscaster | Credited as Ollie Campbell |
| 2022 | Troll | Dr. David Secord | Credited as Ollie Campbell |
| 2022 | Narvik | George L.D. Gibbs | Credited as Ollie Campbell |
| 2025 | I Know What You Did Last Summer | Grant Spencer | |
| 2025 | Trust | Peter | |
| —N/a | 10 Things I Hate About Life | | Unfinished and unreleased |

=== Television ===
| Year | Title | Role | Notes |
|---|---|---|---|
| 1984 | Family Ties | Lyle | Episode: "Best Man" |
| 1984–85 | Dynasty | Luke Fuller | Recurring role |
| 1985 | First Steps | Dwayne | TV film |
| 1986 | Dream West | Lt. Gaines | TV miniseries |
| 1986–88 | Crime Story | Det. Joey Indelli | Regular role |
| 1988 | Star Trek: The Next Generation | Captain Thadiun Okona | Episode: "The Outrageous Okona" |
| 1989 | CBS Summer Playhouse | Wayne | Episode: "The Heat" |
| 1993 | Moon over Miami | Walter Tatum | Main role |
| 1993 | Armistead Maupin's Tales of the City | Jon Fielding | TV miniseries |
| 1995 | Out There | Delbert Mosley | TV film |
| 1996 | The Cold Equations | Lt. John Barton | TV film |
| 1997 | The Naked Truth | Luke | Episode: "A Year in the Life" |
| 1998 | Frasier | Dr. Clint Webber | Episode: "The Perfect Guy" |
| 1998 | Armistead Maupin's More Tales of the City | Jon Fielding | TV miniseries |
| 1998 | Monday After the Miracle | John Macy | TV film |
| 1998 | Max Q | Clay Jarvis | TV film |
| 1999 | Dead Man's Gun | John Slattery | Episode: "The Regulator" |
| 1999–2002 | Once and Again | Rick Sammler | Main role |
| 2000 | In the Beginning | Moses | TV miniseries |
| 2001 | Further Tales of the City | Dr. Jon Fielding | TV miniseries |
| 2002 | CMT 40 Greatest Women of Country Music | Host | TV special |
| 2003 | The Stranger Beside Me | Ted Bundy | TV film |
| 2003 | The Practice | Tom Bartos | Episode: "Goodbye" |
| 2004 | Law & Order: Special Victims Unit | Ron Polikoff | Episode: "Doubt" |
| 2004–07 | The 4400 | Jordan Collier | Main role |
| 2005 | The O.C. | Carter Buckley | Recurring role |
| 2007–08 | Shark | Wayne Callison | Episode: "Wayne's World" |
| 2008 | The Circuit | Al Shines | TV film |
| 2009 | Meteor | Det. Jack Crowe | TV miniseries |
| 2009 | Eureka | Dr. Bruce Manlius | Episode: "Shower the People" |
| 2009 | Revolution | Tom Hart | TV film |
| 2010 | Melrose Place | Ben Brinkley | 3 episodes |
| 2011–12, 2014 | The Killing | Darren Richmond | Regular role (seasons 1–2), "Eden" |
| 2013 | Killing Lincoln | Abraham Lincoln | TV film |
| 2013 | Full Circle | Trent Campbell | 3 episodes |
| 2014 | Lizzie Borden Took an Ax | Andrew Jennings | TV film |
| 2014 | Delirium | Thomas Fineman | Unsold TV pilot |
| 2014–15 | Helix | Dr. Alan Farragut | Main role |
| 2017 | Modus | Dale Tyler | Recurring role (season 2) |
| 2017–20 | Cardinal | Det. John Cardinal | Main role |
| 2019–20 | The Rocketeer | Dave Secord (voice) | Main role |
| 2022–24 | Star Trek: Prodigy | Captain Thadiun Okona (voice) | 3 episodes |
| 2023 | FBI | Detective Jack Lombardo | Episode: "Sins of the Father" |
| 2023 | Something Undone | Pastor Cape | 5 episodes |
| 2024 | Mr. & Mrs. Smith | Parker Martin | Guest star |

== Awards and nominations ==
| Institution | Year | Category | Work | Result |
|---|---|---|---|---|
| Canadian Screen Awards | 2018 | Best Actor, Television Film or Miniseries | Cardinal | Won |
| Canadian Screen Awards | 2019 | Best Actor, Television Film or Miniseries | Cardinal | Won |
| Canadian Screen Awards | 2020 | Best Actor in a Continuing Leading Dramatic Role | Cardinal | Won |
| Canadian Screen Awards | 2021 | Best Actor in a Continuing Leading Dramatic Role | Cardinal | Nominated |
| Golden Globe Awards | 2000 | Best Actor – Television Series Drama | Once and Again | Nominated |
| International Emmy Awards | 2018 | Best Actor | Cardinal | Nominated |
| Monte-Carlo Television Festival | 2018 | Outstanding Actor in a Drama TV Series | Cardinal | Nominated |
| People's Choice Awards | 2000 | Favorite Male Performer In A New TV Series | Once and Again | Won |
| Satellite Awards | 2002 | Best Supporting Actor – Series, Miniseries or Television Film | Further Tales of the City | Nominated |

== See also ==
- List of Star Trek: The Next Generation cast members
