= List of The New York Times number-one books of 2015 =

The American daily newspaper The New York Times publishes multiple weekly lists ranking the best-selling books in the United States. The lists are split into three genres—fiction, nonfiction and children's books. Both the fiction and nonfiction lists are further split into multiple lists.

== Fiction ==
The following list ranks the number-one best-selling fiction books, in the combined print and e-books category. The most frequent weekly best seller was The Girl on the Train by Paula Hawkins with 16 weeks at the top of the list.

Date	Book	Author
January 4	Gray Mountain	John Grisham
January 11	Gone Girl	Gillian Flynn
January 18	All the Light We Cannot See	Anthony Doerr
January 25	All the Light We Cannot See	Anthony Doerr
February 1	The Girl on the Train	Paula Hawkins
February 8	The Girl on the Train	Paula Hawkins
February 15	The Girl on the Train	Paula Hawkins
February 22	The Girl on the Train	Paula Hawkins
March 1	The Girl on the Train	Paula Hawkins
March 8	The Girl on the Train	Paula Hawkins
March 15	The Girl on the Train	Paula Hawkins
March 22	The Girl on the Train	Paula Hawkins
March 29	The Girl on the Train	Paula Hawkins
April 5	The Girl on the Train	Paula Hawkins
April 12	The Girl on the Train	Paula Hawkins
April 19	The Girl on the Train	Paula Hawkins
April 26	The Girl on the Train	Paula Hawkins
May 3	The Liar	Nora Roberts
May 10	Memory Man	David Baldacci
May 17	Gathering Prey	John Sandford
May 24	14th Deadly Sin	James Patterson
May 31	The Girl on the Train	Paula Hawkins
June 7	The Girl on the Train	Paula Hawkins
June 14	Radiant Angel	Nelson DeMille
June 21	Finders Keepers	Stephen King
June 28	The Girl on the Train	Paula Hawkins
July 5	Grey	E. L. James
July 12	Grey	E. L. James
July 19	Grey	E. L. James
July 26	Grey	E. L. James
August 2	Go Set a Watchman	Harper Lee
August 9	Go Set a Watchman	Harper Lee
August 16	Go Set a Watchman	Harper Lee
August 23	Alert	James Patterson and Michael Ledwidge
August 30	Go Set a Watchman	Harper Lee
September 6	Friction	Sandra Brown
September 13	X	Sue Grafton
September 20	The Girl in the Spider's Web	David Lagercrantz
September 27	Make Me	Lee Child
October 4	The Martian	Andy Weir
October 11	The Martian	Andy Weir
October 18	The Martian	Andy Weir
October 25	The Survivor	Vince Flynn and Kyle Mills
November 1	See Me	Nicholas Sparks
November 8	Rogue Lawyer	John Grisham
November 15	Rogue Lawyer	John Grisham
November 22	The Crossing	Michael Connelly
November 29	Rogue Lawyer	John Grisham
December 6	Tricky Twenty-Two	Janet Evanovich
December 13	Cross Justice	James Patterson
December 20	The Nightingale	Kristin Hannah
December 27	Rogue Lawyer	John Grisham

== Nonfiction ==
The following list ranks the number-one best-selling nonfiction books, in the combined print and e-books category. The most frequent weekly best sellers of the year were American Sniper and Killing Reagan.

Date	Book	Author	Publisher
January 4	Unbroken	Laura Hillenbrand	Random House
January 11	Unbroken	Laura Hillenbrand	Random House
January 18	Unbroken	Laura Hillenbrand	Random House
January 25	Unbroken	Laura Hillenbrand	Random House
February 1	American Sniper	Chris Kyle with Scott McEwen and Jim DeFelice	Morrow/HarperCollins
February 8	American Sniper	Chris Kyle with Scott McEwen and Jim DeFelice	Morrow/HarperCollins
February 15	American Sniper	Chris Kyle with Scott McEwen and Jim DeFelice	Morrow/HarperCollins
February 22	American Sniper	Chris Kyle with Scott McEwen and Jim DeFelice	Morrow/HarperCollins
March 1	American Sniper	Chris Kyle with Scott McEwen and Jim DeFelice	Morrow/HarperCollins
March 8	American Sniper	Chris Kyle with Scott McEwen and Jim DeFelice	Morrow/HarperCollins
March 15	American Sniper	Chris Kyle with Scott McEwen and Jim DeFelice	Morrow/HarperCollins
March 22	American Sniper	Chris Kyle with Scott McEwen and Jim DeFelice	Morrow/HarperCollins
March 29	Dead Wake	Erik Larson	Crown
April 5	Dead Wake	Erik Larson	Crown
April 12	Becoming Steve Jobs	Brent Schlender and Rick Tetzeli	Crown
April 19	Dead Wake	Erik Larson	Crown
April 26	The Residence	Kate Andersen Brower	Harper
May 3	The Road to Character	David Brooks	Random House
May 10	And the Good News Is...	Dana Perino	Twelve
May 17	Hope	Amanda Berry and Gina DeJesus	Viking
May 24	The Wright Brothers	David McCullough	Simon & Schuster
May 31	The Wright Brothers	David McCullough	Simon & Schuster
June 7	The Wright Brothers	David McCullough	Simon & Schuster
June 14	The Wright Brothers	David McCullough	Simon & Schuster
June 21	The Wright Brothers	David McCullough	Simon & Schuster
June 28	The Wright Brothers	David McCullough	Simon & Schuster
July 5	The Wright Brothers	David McCullough	Simon & Schuster
July 12	Down the Rabbit Hole	Holly Madison	Dey Street
July 19	Down the Rabbit Hole	Holly Madison	Dey Street
July 26	Down the Rabbit Hole	Holly Madison	Dey Street
August 2	Between the World and Me	Ta-Nehisi Coates	Spiegel & Grau
August 9	Between the World and Me	Ta-Nehisi Coates	Spiegel & Grau
August 16	Between the World and Me	Ta-Nehisi Coates	Spiegel & Grau
August 23	Plunder and Deceit	Mark Levin	Threshold Editions
August 30	Plunder and Deceit	Mark Levin	Threshold Editions
September 6	It Is About Islam	Glenn Beck	Threshold Editions/Mercury Radio Arts
September 13	It Is About Islam	Glenn Beck	Threshold Editions/Mercury Radio Arts
September 20	A Walk in the Woods	Bill Bryson	Broadway
September 27	A Walk in the Woods	Bill Bryson	Broadway
October 4	Why Not Me?	Mindy Kaling	Crown
October 11	Killing Reagan	Bill O'Reilly and Martin Dugard	Holt
October 18	Killing Reagan	Bill O'Reilly and Martin Dugard	Holt
October 25	Killing Reagan	Bill O'Reilly and Martin Dugard	Holt
November 1	Humans of New York: Stories	Brandon Stanton	St. Martin's
November 8	Killing Reagan	Bill O'Reilly and Martin Dugard	Holt
November 15	Killing Reagan	Bill O'Reilly and Martin Dugard	Holt
November 22	Troublemaker	Leah Remini and Rebecca Paley	Ballantine
November 29	Troublemaker	Leah Remini and Rebecca Paley	Ballantine
December 6	Killing Reagan	Bill O'Reilly and Martin Dugard	Holt
December 13	Killing Reagan	Bill O'Reilly and Martin Dugard	Holt
December 20	Humans of New York: Stories	Brandon Stanton	St. Martin's Press
December 27	Killing Reagan	Bill O'Reilly and Martin Dugard	Holt

== See also ==
- Publishers Weekly list of bestselling novels in the United States in the 2010s
