= Killing the Rising Sun =

2016 book by Martin Dugard

- Author: Bill O'Reilly; Martin Dugard
- Language: English
- Subject: Atomic bombings of Hiroshima and Nagasaki
- Publisher: Henry Holt and Company
- Publication date: September 13, 2016
- Publication place: United States
- Media type: Hardcover
- Pages: 336
- ISBN: 978-1-62779-062-8

Killing the Rising Sun: How America Vanquished World War II Japan is a book written by Bill O'Reilly and Martin Dugard about the Pacific Theater during WWII and concludes with details of the Atomic bombings of Hiroshima and Nagasaki in August, 1945. It is the sixth book in the Killing series, following Killing Lincoln, Killing Kennedy, Killing Jesus, Killing Patton and Killing Reagan. The book was released on September 13, 2016.

== Reception ==
USA Today accorded the book two out of four stars. "None of this is new," stated the review. "Readers of history will have learned the same lessons from John Dower's Embracing Defeat or Richard Frank's Downfall, two of many rich accounts of the war against Japan. But that's not O'Reilly's way; he views history as another lens through which he can view himself." "The book is a mess," wrote Pete Dexter and Jeff Nale in The Daily Beast. "O’Reilly and his co-writer Martin Dugard write sentences without life—flat, passive, riddled with clichés, sometimes four or five of them crammed into a single short paragraph. O’Reilly moves mindlessly from the present tense to the past and then back again, possibly it was someone’s idea of a cure for dead sentences. His research—what he calls 'the truth'—isn’t fresh, but then, real historians and writers have spent years studying and dramatizing the war in the Pacific. What O’Reilly has done is read the Cliffs Notes and written your term paper for thirty bucks." They further wrote that the authors' emphasis on "bloated bodies, stacked bodies, rotting bodies, and the stench of 'internal organs spilling from the gash in a torrent'” imparts "the taste of pornography" to the book.
