= Martin Dugard =

Martin Dugard is the name of:

- Martin Dugard (author) (born 1961), American author
- Martin Dugard (speedway rider) (born 1969), former British motorcycle speedway rider

== See also ==
- Roger Martin du Gard (1881–1958), French author and winner of the 1937 Nobel Prize for Literature
