= Critics' Choice Television Award for Best Movie/Miniseries =

Award category

Critics' Choice Television Award for Best Movie or Limited Series
- Country: United States
- Presented by: Critics Choice Association
- First award: 2011
- Currently held by: TV Movie: Bridget Jones: Mad About the Boy; Limited Series: Adolescence (2026)
- Website: criticschoice.com

The Critics' Choice Television Award for Best Movie/Limited Series is one of the award categories presented annually by the Critics' Choice Television Awards (BTJA). It was introduced in 2012. The winners are selected by a group of television critics that are part of the Broadcast Television Critics Association. In 2014, the category was split, due to the amount of entries for both.

== Winners and nominees ==
indicates the winner

=== 2010s ===
Year	Title	Network
2012	Movie/Miniseries	
2012	Sherlock	PBS
2012	American Horror Story	FX
2012	Game Change	HBO
2012	The Hour	BBC America
2012	Luther	BBC America
2012	Page Eight	PBS
2013	Behind the Candelabra	HBO
2013	American Horror Story: Asylum	FX
2013	The Crimson Petal and the White	Encore
2013	The Hour	BBC America
2013	Political Animals	USA
2013	Top of the Lake	Sundance Channel
2014
2014	Movie	
2014	The Normal Heart	HBO
2014	An Adventure in Space and Time	BBC America
2014	Burton & Taylor	BBC America
2014	Killing Kennedy	Nat Geo
2014	Sherlock: "His Last Vow"	PBS
2014	The Trip to Bountiful	Lifetime
2014	Miniseries	
2014	Fargo	FX
2014	Bonnie & Clyde	A&E / History / Lifetime
2014	Dancing on the Edge	Starz
2014	American Horror Story: Coven	FX
2014	The Hollow Crown	PBS
2014	Luther	BBC America
2015
2015	Movie	
2015	Bessie	HBO
2015	Killing Jesus	Nat Geo
2015	Nightingale	HBO
2015	A Poet in New York	BBC America
2015	Stockholm, Pennsylvania	Lifetime
2015	Limited Series	
2015	Olive Kitteridge	HBO
2015	24: Live Another Day	Fox
2015	American Crime	ABC
2015	The Book of Negroes	BET
2015	The Honourable Woman	SundanceTV
2015	Wolf Hall	PBS
2016 (1)	Fargo	FX
2016 (1)	Childhood's End	Syfy
2016 (1)	Luther	BBC America
2016 (1)	Saints & Strangers	Nat Geo
2016 (1)	Show Me a Hero	HBO
2016 (1)	The Wiz Live!	NBC
2016 (2)	The People v. O. J. Simpson: American Crime Story	FX
2016 (2)	All the Way	HBO
2016 (2)	Confirmation	HBO
2016 (2)	Killing Reagan	Nat Geo
2016 (2)	The Night Manager	AMC
2016 (2)	Roots	History
2018	TV movie	
2018	The Wizard of Lies	HBO
2018	Flint	Lifetime
2018	I Am Elizabeth Smart	Lifetime
2018	The Immortal Life of Henrietta Lacks	HBO
2018	Sherlock: "The Lying Detective"	PBS
2018	Limited Series	
2018	Big Little Lies	HBO
2018	American Vandal	Netflix
2018	Godless	Netflix
2018	Fargo	FX
2018	Feud: Bette and Joan	FX
2018	The Long Road Home	Nat Geo
2019	TV movie	
2019	Jesus Christ Superstar Live in Concert	NBC
2019	Icebox	HBO
2019	My Dinner with Hervé	HBO
2019	Notes from the Field	HBO
2019	The Tale	HBO
2019	King Lear	Prime Video
2019	Limited Series	
2019	The Assassination of Gianni Versace: American Crime Story	FX
2019	American Vandal	Netflix
2019	Escape at Dannemora	Showtime
2019	Genius: Picasso	Nat Geo
2019	Sharp Objects	HBO
2019	A Very English Scandal	Prime Video

=== 2020s ===
Year	Title	Network
2020	TV movie	
2020	El Camino: A Breaking Bad Movie	Netflix
2020	Brexit	HBO
2020	Deadwood: The Movie	HBO
2020	Native Son	HBO
2020	Guava Island	Prime Video
2020	Patsy & Loretta	Lifetime
2020	Limited Series	
2020	When They See Us	Netflix
2020	Catch-22	Hulu
2020	Chernobyl	HBO
2020	Years and Years	HBO
2020	Fosse/Verdon	FX
2020	The Loudest Voice	Showtime
2020	Unbelievable	Netflix
2021	TV movie	
2021	Hamilton	Disney+
2021	Bad Education	HBO
2021	Between the World and Me	HBO
2021	The Clark Sisters: First Ladies of Gospel	Lifetime
2021	Sylvie's Love	Prime Video
2021	What the Constitution Means to Me	Prime Video
2021	Limited Series	
2021	The Queen's Gambit	Netflix
2021	I May Destroy You	HBO
2021	The Plot Against America	HBO
2021	The Undoing	HBO
2021	Mrs. America	FX on Hulu
2021	Normal People	Hulu
2021	Small Axe	Prime Video
2021	Unorthodox	Netflix
2022	TV movie	
2022	Oslo	HBO
2022	Come from Away	Apple TV+
2022	List of a Lifetime	Lifetime
2022	The Map of Tiny Perfect Things	Prime Video
2022	Robin Roberts Presents: Mahalia	Lifetime
2022	Zoey's Extraordinary Christmas	The Roku Channel
2022	Limited Series	
2022	Mare of Easttown	HBO
2022	Dopesick	Hulu
2022	Dr. Death	HBO
2022	It's a Sin	HBO Max
2022	Maid	Netflix
2022	Midnight Mass	Netflix
2022	The Underground Railroad	Prime Video
2022	WandaVision	Disney+
2023	TV movie	
2023	Weird: The Al Yankovic Story	The Roku Channel
2023	Fresh	Hulu
2023	Prey	Hulu
2023	Ray Donovan: The Movie	Showtime
2023	The Survivor	HBO
2023	Three Months	Paramount+
2023	Limited Series	
2023	The Dropout	Hulu
2023	Gaslit	Starz
2023	The Girl from Plainville	Hulu
2023	The Offer	Paramount+
2023	Pam & Tommy	Hulu
2023	Station Eleven	HBO Max
2023	This Is Going to Hurt	AMC+
2023	Under the Banner of Heaven	FX
2024	TV movie	
2024	Quiz Lady	Hulu
2024	The Caine Mutiny Court-Martial	Showtime
2024	Finestkind	Paramount+
2024	Mr. Monk's Last Case: A Monk Movie	Peacock
2024	No One Will Save You	Hulu
2024	Reality	HBO/Max
2024	Limited Series	
2024	Beef	Netflix
2024	Daisy Jones & the Six	Amazon Prime Video
2024	Fargo	FX
2024	Fellow Travelers	Showtime
2024	Lessons in Chemistry	Apple TV+
2024	Love & Death	HBO/Max
2024	A Murder at the End of the World	FX
2024	A Small Light	National Geographic
2025	TV movie	
2025	Rebel Ridge	Netflix
2025	The Great Lillian Hall	HBO
2025	It's What's Inside	Netflix
2025	Música	Prime Video
2025	Out of My Mind	Disney+
2025	V/H/S/Beyond	Shudder
2025	Limited Series	
2025	Baby Reindeer	Netflix
2025	Disclaimer	Apple TV+
2025	Masters of the Air	Apple TV+
2025	Mr Bates vs The Post Office	PBS
2025	The Penguin	HBO
2025	Ripley	Netflix
2025	True Detective: Night Country	HBO
2025	We Were the Lucky Ones	Hulu
2026	TV movie	
2026	Bridget Jones: Mad About the Boy	Peacock
2026	Deep Cover	Prime Video
2026	The Gorge	Apple TV
2026	Mountainhead	HBO
2026	Nonnas	Netflix
2026	Summer of 69	Hulu
2026	Limited Series	
2026	Adolescence	Netflix
2026	All Her Fault	Peacock
2026	Chief of War	Apple TV
2026	Death by Lightning	Netflix
2026	Devil in Disguise: John Wayne Gacy	Peacock
2026	Dope Thief	Apple TV
2026	Dying for Sex	FX on Hulu
2026	The Girlfriend	Prime Video

== See also ==
- Primetime Emmy Award for Outstanding Limited or Anthology Series
- Primetime Emmy Award for Outstanding Television Movie
- Golden Globe Award for Best Miniseries or Television Film
- TCA Award for Outstanding Achievement in Movies, Miniseries and Specials
