= Killing Kennedy (film) =

- Promotional poster
- Genre: Docudrama
- Based on: Killing Kennedy by: Bill O'Reilly; Martin Dugard
- Written by: Kelly Masterson
- Directed by: Nelson McCormick
- Starring: Rob Lowe; Will Rothhaar; Ginnifer Goodwin; Michelle Trachtenberg
- Music by: Geoff Zanelli
- Country of origin: United States
- Original language: English

Production
- Executive producers: Ridley Scott; David W. Zucker; Mary Lisio; Bill O'Reilly; Teri Weinberg; Howard Owens; Noel Siegel; Charlie Parsons; Richard J. Wells
- Producer: Larry Rapaport
- Cinematography: Stephen St. John
- Editor: Adam Wolfe
- Running time: 92 minutes
- Production company: Scott Free Productions

Original release
- Network: National Geographic Channel
- Release: November 10, 2013

Killing Kennedy is a 2013 American docudrama TV film directed by Nelson McCormick and written by Kelly Masterson, based on the 2012 non-fiction book of the same title by Bill O'Reilly and Martin Dugard. The film stars Rob Lowe, Will Rothhaar, Ginnifer Goodwin, and Michelle Trachtenberg. It dramatizes the presidency and assassination of John F. Kennedy, as well as the life of Lee Harvey Oswald in the years leading up to the assassination.

It premiered in the United States and Canada on National Geographic Channel on November 10, 2013, followed by the various European National Geographic channels a few days later. It was first shown on terrestrial TV in the UK by Channel 4 on November 23, 2013 and in South Korea on November 21, 2013.

== Plot summary ==
The plot follows the rise of John F. Kennedy (Lowe) as he becomes President of the United States. As Kennedy's career shapes, Lee Harvey Oswald (Rothhaar), a former marine, begins to grow disillusioned with the US. Their paths ultimately cross and results in Oswald's assassination of Kennedy.

== Main cast ==
- Rob Lowe as John F. Kennedy
- Will Rothhaar as Lee Harvey Oswald
- Ginnifer Goodwin as Jacqueline Kennedy
- Michelle Trachtenberg as Marina Oswald
- Jack Noseworthy as Robert F. Kennedy
- Francis Guinan as Lyndon B. Johnson
- Richard Flood as Kenny O'Donnell
- Natalie Gold as Ruth Paine
- Jamie McShane as US Moscow Embassy consul Richard Edward Snyder
- Brian Hutchison as USSS Special Agent Winston Lawson
- Casey Siemaszko as Jack Ruby
- Antoinette LaVecchia as Lady Bird Johnson
- Boris McGiver as FBI Special Agent John W. Fain
- Matt Micou as J. D. Tippit
- Keith Tyree as Governor John Connally
- Adrienne Nelson as Nellie Connally
- Lucas N Hall as Officer Atwell
- Roger W. Durrett as Admiral Arleigh Burke, Chief of Naval Operations
- Danny McCarthy as Agent James P. Hosty
- Parker Dowling as Buell Wesley Frazier
- Mike Shiflett as Captain Will Fritz
- Terry Menefee Gau as Nurse Doris Nelson
- Joseph Gray as Sergeant Gerald Hill
- Mary Pat Gleason as Marguerite Oswald
- Demosthenes Chrysan as George de Mohrenschildt

== Production ==
After the success of Killing Lincoln, National Geographic Channel announced it would produce a film adaptation of Killing Kennedy. In May 2013, it was announced that Rob Lowe was to play President John F. Kennedy, Ginnifer Goodwin would play First Lady Jacqueline Kennedy, and Michelle Trachtenberg would portray Lee Harvey Oswald's wife Marina Oswald. Goodwin used intimate photos to better portray Jackie Kennedy and was concerned "to do her justice and to play her as accurately as possible without ever doing an impression of her." Costar Rob Lowe said of seeing Goodwin in the pink Chanel suit, "It made it real. If I were under any illusions about what we were doing, seeing her in that iconic moment was, I would say, sobering." While portraying Marina Oswald, Trachtenberg consulted her Russian-born mother for help in speaking Russian. Filming took place in Richmond, Virginia.

== Reception ==
On its original airing, it drew in 3,354,000 viewers, averaging a 1.1 rating with adults in the 25-54 demographic. The viewership broke the record previously held by Killing Lincoln which averaged 3,351,000 viewers.

=== Critical response ===
Killing Kennedy received mixed reviews from both viewers and critics. On Rotten Tomatoes the series holds an approval rating of 56% based on 18 reviews, with an average of 5.9/10. On Metacritic, it has a weighted average score of 55 out of 100, based on 13 critics, indicating "mixed or average" reviews.

=== Awards and nominations ===
Year	Association	Category	Nominee	Result
2014	Critics' Choice Television Awards	Best Movie/Miniseries	Killing Kennedy	Nominated
2014	Directors Guild of America Award	Outstanding Directing – Television Film	Nelson McCormick	Nominated
2014	Screen Actors Guild Awards	Outstanding Performance by a Male Actor in a Miniseries or Television Movie	Rob Lowe	Nominated
2014	Writers Guild of America Award	Long Form – Adaptation	Kelly Masterson	Nominated
2014	Primetime Emmy Awards	Outstanding Television Movie		Nominated
2014	Primetime Emmy Awards	Outstanding Cinematography for a Miniseries or Movie	Stephen St. John	Nominated
2014	Primetime Emmy Awards	Outstanding Sound Mixing for a Miniseries or a Movie	William Britt, Mark Linden & Tara Paul	Nominated

== See also ==
- Assassination of John F. Kennedy in popular culture
- Robert F. Kennedy in media
- Cultural depictions of Jacqueline Kennedy Onassis
