= The Last Voyage of Columbus =

2005 nonfiction book by Martin Dugard

- Book cover, paperback edition.
- Author: Martin Dugard
- Language: English
- Genre: Biography
- Publisher: Little, Brown & Company
- Publication date: June 1, 2005
- Media type: Novel
- Pages: 304
- ISBN: 0-7595-1376-7

The Last Voyage of Columbus: Being the Epic Tale of the Great Captain's Fourth Expedition, Including Accounts of Sword fight, Mutiny, Shipwreck, Gold, War, Hurricane and Discovery (also referred to as The Last Voyage of Columbus) is a non-fiction book, authored by Martin Dugard and published in 2005 by Little, Brown and Company. The plot is a lifelong account of explorer Christopher Columbus and his founding of what is now often referred to as the New World. The book received positive reviews by critics.

== Plot ==
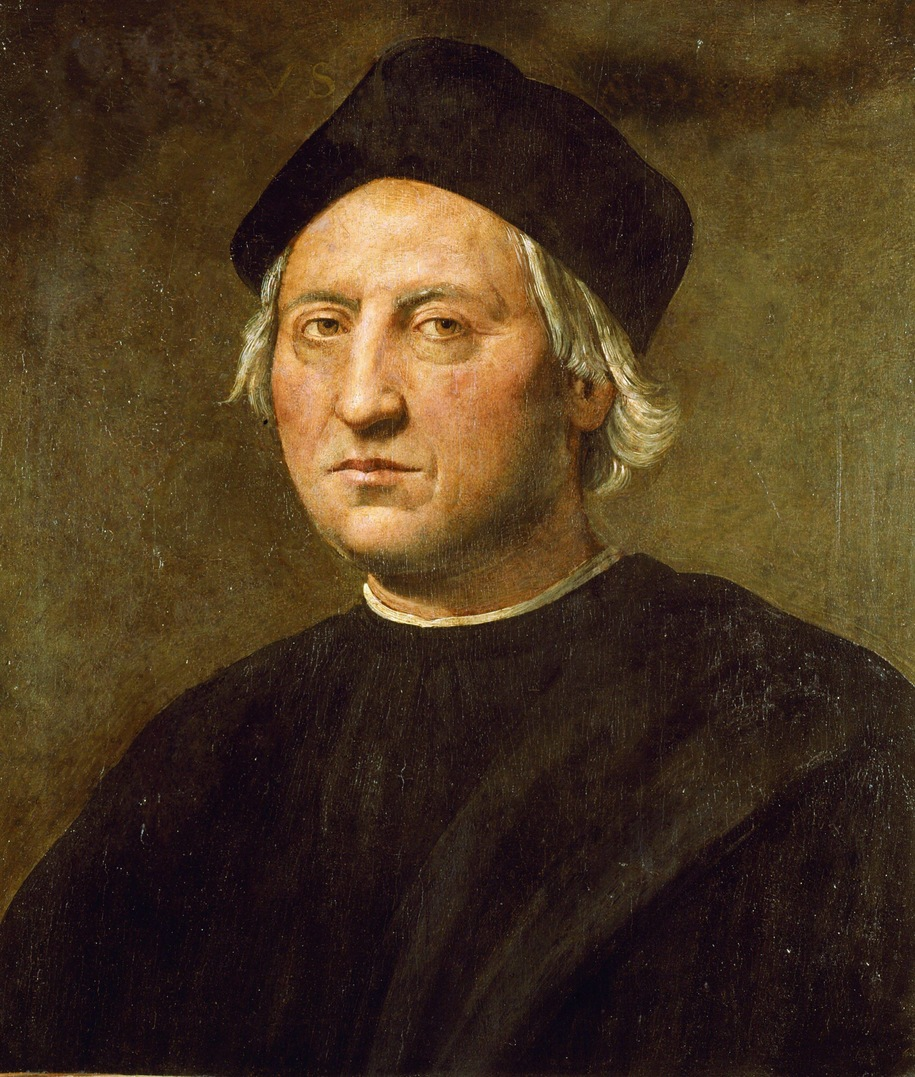
Christopher Columbus, the subject of the book, was an explorer and one of the first European founders of the Americas.

The books topic focuses on Christopher Columbus's one last voyage to the ends of the earth. The voyage is his final chance to prove himself and thus become the first man ever to circumnavigate the world. The goal was to find a westward passage through Central America and reach the Maluku Islands, also known as the Spice Islands.

Columbus would later claim that this fourth voyage was his greatest. It was without question his riskiest and most challenging.

"Of the four ships he led into the unknown, none returned. Columbus would face the worst storms a European explorer had ever encountered. He would battle to survive amid mutiny, war, and a shipwreck that left him stranded on the desert isle of Jamaica for almost a year. On his tail were his enemies, sent from Europe to track him down. In front of him: the unknown.

The account of this final voyage brings Columbus to life as never before adventurer, businessman, father, tyrant, and hero"

== Reception ==
Ben Cosgrove of The San Francisco Chronicle comments "Dugard's book breathes life into that futile, unquenchable, 500-year-old dream. There's adventure for you." Ben Sisario of The New York Times noted about that book that "In a rich, fluent account, Dugard offers both a gripping naval adventure and a revealing history of the competitive mercantile politics of the turn of the 16th century, and portrays Columbus as a star-crossed striver eager to legitimize his quest." James Neal Webb of Book Page comments "The Last Voyage of Columbus, a new book by Martin Dugard, is of the latter variety, and in it we find a figure who, while familiar, is more human and thus more interesting than the Christopher Columbus we know from history textbook."

== TV film ==
In 2007, the History Channel released the TV film Columbus: The Lost Voyage based partly on Dugard's book.
