= David Zuckerman =

David Zuckerman may refer to:

- David Zuckerman (politician) (born 1971), former lieutenant governor of Vermont
- David Zuckerman (computer scientist), professor of computer science, University of Texas at Austin
- David Zuckerman (TV producer) (born 1962), American television producer and writer

== See also ==
- David Zucker (disambiguation)
