= Haaz Sleiman =

Lebanese actor (born 1976)

- هاز سليمان
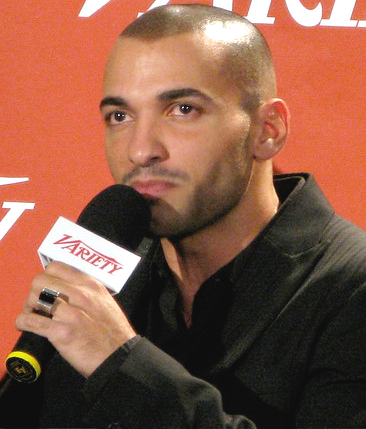
- Sleiman in 2008
- Born: 1 July 1976 (age 50); United Arab Emirates
- Education: Wayne State University
- Occupation: Actor
- Years active: 2004–present

Haaz Sleiman (/ˈhɑːz ˈsleɪmən/; Arabic: هاز سليمان; born 1 July 1976) is a Lebanese actor. He most notably played the role of Tarek in the 2007 film The Visitor for which he was nominated for the Independent Spirit Award for Best Supporting Male and the role of Jesus in the American TV mini-series Killing Jesus, in addition to a number of American TV series.

== Early life ==
Sleiman was born in the United Arab Emirates (UAE) and raised in Beirut, Lebanon. He immigrated to the United States when he was twenty-one years old.

== Career ==
In 2006, Sleiman portrayed an American soldier in Iraq on the NBC series ER and, that same year, had a recurring role as an Arab billionaire in the CBS series Company Town. He portrayed the terrorist suspect Heydar in three 2007 episodes of the FOX series 24 and appeared on both NCIS and Veronica Mars in 2007.

He co-starred as Tarek, an undocumented Syrian immigrant in the critically acclaimed 2007 independent film The Visitor, a drama directed by Tom McCarthy. The film was nominated for a Screen Actors Guild Award and an Academy Award. Sleiman also had small roles in the 2006 film American Dreamz and the 2007 film AmericanEast.

Sleiman played nurse Mohammed "Mo-Mo" De La Cruz in the first season of the Showtime dark comedy series Nurse Jackie, which premiered in June 2009.

In 2011, Sleiman played the role of Omar, a Palestinian activist, in the Channel 4 mini-series The Promise.

Sleiman also played the role of Kasim Tariq in the CW Network TV show Nikita; he appeared in two episodes.

Sleiman played Dr Rabia, a Syrian doctor in Channel 4's The State.

In 2013, Sleiman started as the titular character in the short lived Off-Broadway musical Venice.

== Personal life ==
In an interview with the Christian Broadcasting Network, Sleiman said that he is Muslim, Christian, and Jewish. On 22 August 2017, he came out as gay via a Facebook video.

== Filmography ==
=== Film ===
Year	Title	Role	Notes
2004	The Ski Trip	Tyson	
2006	American Dreamz	Mujeheddin Captain	
2006	The Fourth Estate		Short film
2007	The Visitor	Tarek	
2007	Futbaal: The Price of Dreams	Ace	
2008	AmericanEast	Slick Ali	
2011	Dorfman in Love	Cookie	
2012	Highland Park	Ali Rasheed	Video on demand
2015	Those People	Tim	
2015	Ideal	Photographer	Short film
2016	Offer and Compromise	Scott	
2019	Love & Debt	Scott	
2019	3022	Thomas Dahan	
2020	Breaking Fast	Mo	
2021	Eternals	Ben	
2022	Moving On	Gun Shop Salesman	

=== Television ===
Year	Title	Role	Notes
2006	Company Town	Abby Faisal	Unsold television pilot
2006	ER	Hodgkins	Episode: "The Gallant Hero and the Tragic Victor"
2007	24	Heydar	3 episodes (season 6)
2007	NCIS	Abdul Wahid	Episode: "Grace Period"
2007	Veronica Mars	Nasir Ben-Hafald	Episode: "Un-American Graffiti"
2009	Nurse Jackie	Mohammed "Mo-Mo" de la Cruz	Main role (season 1; 12 episodes)
2010, 2011	Nikita	Kasim Tariq	2 episodes
2011	The Promise	Omar Habash	Miniseries
2011	CSI: Miami	Marcel Largos	Episode: "Mayday"
2011	Ricochet	Robert Savich	Television film
2011	Meet Jane	Agent Joseph Omari	Television film
2012	Beauty & the Beast	Detective Wolansky	Episode: "All In"
2012, 2015	Covert Affairs	Khalid Ansari	3 episodes (season 3), 1 episode (season 5)
2013	Blue Bloods	Teri Damiri	Episode: "Drawing Dead"
2013	The Good Wife	Zayeed Shaheed	Episode: "Whack-a-Mole"
2014	Person of Interest	Omar Risha	Episode: "Allegiance"
2014	Reckless	Tariq Al Zahrani	Episode: "Fifty-One Percent"
2015	Allegiance	Scott Tolliver	2 episodes
2015	Killing Jesus	Jesus of Nazareth	Television film
2015	The Player	Farid	Episode: "Pilot"
2016	Of Kings and Prophets	Jonathan	Main cast
2017	The State	Dr. Rabia	Miniseries (3 episodes)
2018	Tommy in La La Land	Himself	Documentary (3 episodes)
2018	Jack Ryan	Ali bin Suleiman	Recurring role; 6 episodes
2020	Little America	Rafiq	Episode "The Son"

=== Video game ===
Year	Title	Voice role	Notes
2007	Assassin's Creed	Malik al-Sayf	
2011	Assassin's Creed: Revelations	Suleiman I	
2012	Diablo III		Additional voices
2014	Diablo III: Reaper of Souls		Additional voices
2024	Call of Duty: Black Ops 6		Additional voices

== Awards and nominations ==
Year	Association	Category	Project	Result	Ref.
2008	Boston Society of Film Critics Awards	Best Ensemble Cast	The Visitor	Runner-up	
2008	Independent Spirit Awards	Best Supporting Actor	The Visitor	Nominated	
2008	Gotham Awards	Best Ensemble Cast	The Visitor	Nominated	
2008	Online Film & Television Association Awards	Best Breakthrough Performance – Male	The Visitor	Nominated	
