= David W. Zucker =

American Television Executive and Executive Producer

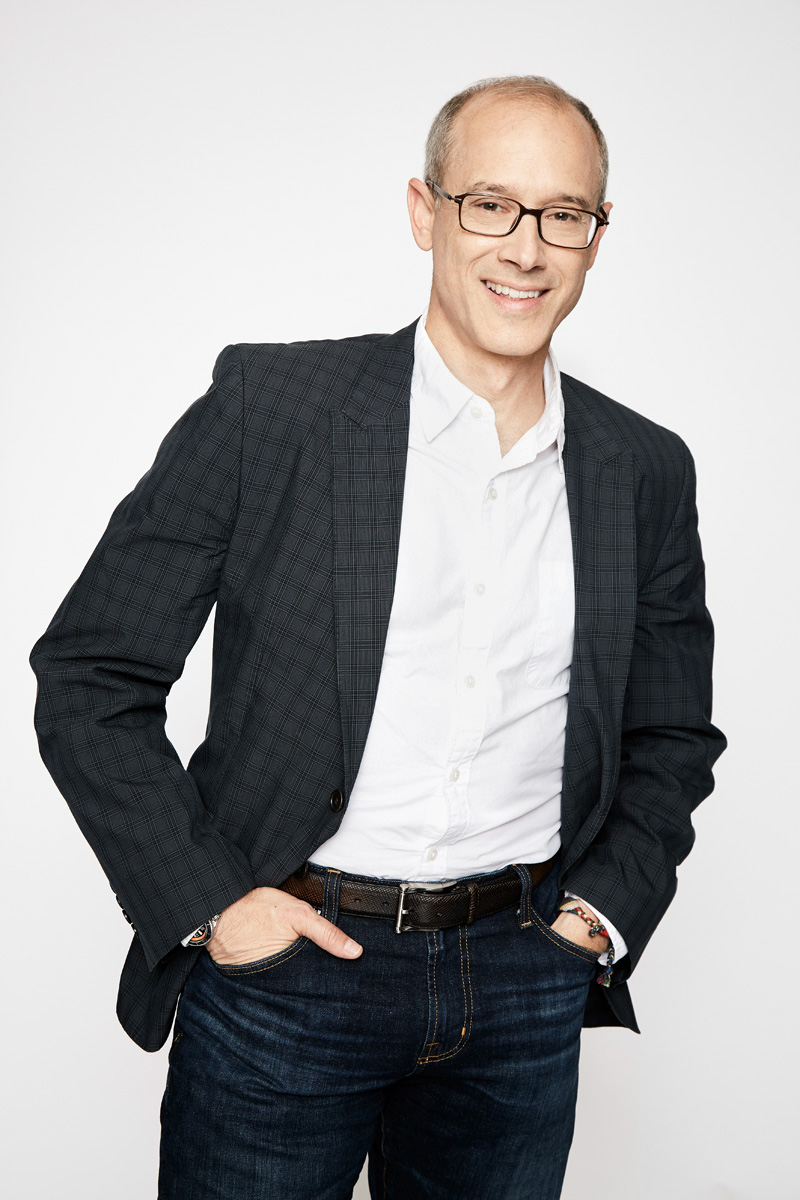
- Occupations: Television executive Executive producer
- Notable work: The Good Wife

David W. Zucker is an American television executive and executive producer, mostly known for producing The Good Wife. He is currently the Chief Creative Officer for Scott Free Productions. He is also the executive producer of notable shows like Eric Garcia's heist anthology series Kaleidoscope for Netflix; HBO Max's sci-fi epic, Raised By Wolves; the Paramount+ drama, The Good Fight; the AMC and Britbox investigative revenge series The Beast Must Die; the National Geographic series The Hot Zone; and Steven Knight's adaptation of the Charles Dickens novel Great Expectations for FX and BBC One. Zucker's projects also include FX's Alien: Earth.

== Credits ==
| Title | Role | Date |
|---|---|---|
| Judging Amy | Writer – 2 episodes | 1999 |
| NUMB3RS | Executive producer | 2005–2010 |
| Orpheus (pilot) | Executive producer | 2006 |
| Law Dogs (pilot) | Executive producer | 2007 |
| The Company | Co-executive producer | 2007 |
| The Andromeda Strain | Executive producer | 2008 |
| Into the Storm | Executive producer | 2009 |
| The Good Wife | Executive producer | 2009–2015 |
| The Pillars of the Earth | Executive producer | 2010 |
| Gettysburg | Executive producer | 2011 |
| Prophets of Science Fiction | Executive producer | 2011–2012 |
| Coma | Executive producer | 2012 |
| World Without End | Executive producer | 2012 |
| Killing Lincoln | Executive producer | 2013 |
| Crimes of the Century | Executive producer | 2013 |
| Killing Kennedy | Executive producer | 2013 |
| Klondike | Executive producer | 2014 |
| Halo: Nightfall | Executive producer | 2014 |
| Killing Jesus | Executive producer | 2015 |
| BrainDead | Executive producer | 2016 |
| Killing Reagan | Executive producer | 2016 |
| The Man in the High Castle | Executive producer | 2015–2017 |
| Mercy Street | Executive producer | 2015–2017 |
| The Good Fight | Executive producer | 2017 |
| Jean-Claude Van Johnson | Executive producer | 2017 |
| Perfect Citizen (pilot) | Executive producer | 2017 |
| The Terror | Executive producer | 2018–present |
| The Passage | Executive producer | 2019 |
| Kaleidoscope | Executive producer | 2023 |
| Great Expectations | Executive producer | 2023 |
| Dope Thief | Executive producer | 2025 |
| Alien: Earth | Executive producer | 2025 |
| Blade Runner 2099 | Executive producer | 2026 |
