= David Zucker (ice hockey) =

Czech ice hockey player

- Born: October 11, 1987 (age 38) Czechoslovakia
- Height: 5 ft 9 in (175 cm)
- Weight: 159 lb (72 kg; 11 st 5 lb)
- Position: Left wing
- Shoots: Left
- Czech Extraliga team: HC Karlovy Vary
- Playing career: 2006–present

David Zucker (born November 11, 1987) is a Czech professional ice hockey player. He played with HC Karlovy Vary in the Czech Extraliga during the 2010–11 Czech Extraliga season.
