= Killing Lincoln (film) =

American television film

- Film poster
- Genre: Docudrama; Biography
- Based on: Killing Lincoln by Bill O'Reilly
- Developed by: Tony Scott
- Written by: Erik Jendresen
- Directed by: Adrian Moat
- Presented by: Tom Hanks
- Starring: Billy Campbell; Jesse Johnson
- Composer: David Buckley
- Country of origin: United States
- Original language: English

Production
- Executive producers: Mark Herzog; Erik Jendresen; Bill O'Reilly; Mary Lisio; Teri Weinberg; David W. Zucker
- Producers: Ridley Scott; Tony Scott; Christopher G. Cowen
- Cinematography: Jeremy Benning
- Running time: 90 minutes
- Production companies: Scott Free Productions; Herzog & Company

Original release
- Network: National Geographic Channel
- Release: February 17, 2013

Killing Lincoln is an American television film inspired by the 2011 book of the same name by Bill O'Reilly and Martin Dugard. This two-hour political docudrama contains events surrounding the presidency and assassination of Abraham Lincoln. It was originally broadcast on National Geographic Channel on February 17, 2013. Narrated and hosted by American actor Tom Hanks, the film stars Billy Campbell as President Lincoln and Jesse Johnson as John Wilkes Booth. It was written and executive produced by Erik Jendresen (Band of Brothers), directed by Adrian Moat (Gettysburg), produced by Chris Cowen, Mark Herzog, Ridley Scott, Tony Scott, Mary Lisio, David Zucker, and Terri Weinberg.

The docudrama was aired in memorial tribute to producer Tony Scott, who was developing the film at the time of his death. The program averaged 3.4 million viewers, scoring about 1 million viewers in the 25–54 demographic. This is currently National Geographic's highest-rated television airing surpassing Inside 9/11, which drew 3 million in August 2005.

Killing Lincoln was made available on Blu-ray Disc on June 11, 2013. It features commentary by Erik Jendresen, an interview with Bill O'Reilly, and multiple behind-the-scenes featurettes.

== Development ==
In January 2012, it was announced that Bill O'Reilly would be executive producing a two-hour documentary for National Geographic Channel, inspired by his New York Times best selling novel Killing Lincoln: The Shocking Assassination That Changed America Forever. Filmmaking brothers Tony and Ridley Scott became attached to the project as producers.

Principal photography began on July 16, 2012, in Richmond, Virginia. It was at this time in which actor Billy Campbell was announced to play President Abraham Lincoln. On August 19, 2012, producer Tony Scott died by suicide. The film was dedicated in his memory.

On September 13, 2012, Tom Hanks, also a 3rd cousin 4 times removed of Lincoln, was announced as the film's "host, narrator and historical commentator".

== Cast ==
- Jesse Johnson as John Wilkes Booth, a famous actor from 1855 until his death, and the leader of the plot to kill Lincoln.
- Billy Campbell as Abraham Lincoln, the 16th President of the United States, and the main target of the assassination.
- Geraldine Hughes as Mary Todd Lincoln, wife of President Lincoln, thus First Lady.
- Kam Dabrowski as James R. Tanner
- Brett Dalton as Robert Todd Lincoln, the President's son.
- Graham Beckel as Edwin Stanton, the Secretary of War.
- Eleanor Perkinson as Clara Harris, who accompanied the Lincolns to Ford's Theatre.
- Todd Fletcher as Edman Spangler, an employee at Ford's Theater.
- Shawn Pyfrom as Pvt. John W. Nichols
- Johnathan Tchaikovsky as Crawford
- Matt Hackman as Charles Leale, a Union surgeon who attended President Lincoln's mortal wounds.
- Myke Holmes as Dr. F.A. King
- Josh Murray as Lewis Powell, a member of Booth's plot, who was assigned the task to kill Secretary of State William Seward.
- Seamus Mulcahy as David Herold, one of the conspirators, who aided Booth on his 12 day escape.
- Vince Nappo as Harry Hawk, the only actor on stage when Booth shot Lincoln and jumped down to the stage.
- Lucas N Hall as a Union Soldier
- Lance Lemon as William Bell, Secretary Seward's house waiter.
- Greg Cooper as Alexander Gardner, a photographer who took pictures of Lincoln and his assassins.
- Andrew Collie as James McCollom
- Ed Easterling as Chief Justice David Kellogg Cartter
- Joe Inscoe as Doctor May
- Benjamin Perkinson as Tad Lincoln, President Lincoln's youngest son.
- Logan Bennett as John McCullough
- Geoffrey Culbertson as Honor Guard Soldier
- Leiv Clegg as Proud Slave
- Paul D'Elia as Charles Forbes, Lincoln's valet.
- Robin Lord Taylor as Sgt. Silas Cobb, who led Booth cross the Navy Yard Bridge.

== Reception ==
=== Ratings ===
Killing Lincoln aired on February 17, 2013, on National Geographic Channel, setting records for the cable network. The network's first factual drama project, Killing Lincoln's 3.4 million viewers was NGC's single highest telecast viewership since its launch in late 1997, only to be topped by 3000 viewers by Killing Kennedy on November 10, 2013. The viewership was especially high for individual broadcasts, with a 175 percent increase from typical broadcasts in that time slot.

=== Critical response ===
On Metacritic, the series has a weighted average score of 56 out of 100, based on 15 critics, indicating "mixed or average" reviews.

== See also ==
- Lincoln assassination conspirators
