= Killing Jesus =

2013 book by Bill O'Reilly

- Author: Bill O'Reilly; Martin Dugard
- Subject: Crucifixion of Jesus
- Publisher: Henry Holt and Co.
- Publication date: September 24, 2013
- Media type: Print (hardcover)
- Pages: 304
- ISBN: 978-0-8050-9854-9
- Preceded by: Killing Lincoln
- Followed by: Killing Patton

Killing Jesus: A History is a 2013 book by Bill O'Reilly and Martin Dugard about the life and crucifixion of Jesus, referred to in the book as Jesus of Nazareth. It is the follow-up to Killing Kennedy and Killing Lincoln. Killing Jesus was released September 24, 2013, through Henry Holt and Company.

The book was a commercial success, debuting at number one on The New York Times bestseller list and remaining on the list for 52 weeks. Popular reviews of the book were mixed, with both Christian and non-Christian reviewers faulting the book for its tedious writing and its claims of historical objectivity. Scholars and historians have criticized the book for its inaccurate, politically-motivated portrayal of Jesus as a "Tea Party Son of God", its uncritical approach to primary sources, its omission of some of Jesus's teachings, and its oversimplified, sensationalist portrayal of history.

Like both its predecessors, the book was adapted into a television film with the same name for National Geographic Channel.

== Writing and research ==
According to The Washington Times, while writing Killing Jesus, O'Reilly and Dugard found that sources were far less plentiful than for the previous books in their Killing... series. They stated that the Internet was "a treasure", but complained that the information on various websites was "contradictory", that "hearsay was often quoted as truth", and that information from one website was frequently shown to be unreliable when checked against information from more reliable sources. Bill O'Reilly stated that he believes the book was inspired by the Holy Spirit.

== Synopsis ==
The book begins with "A Note to Readers" by Bill O'Reilly, which promises, "...this is not a religious book. We do not address Jesus the Messiah, only as a man who galvanized a remote area of the Roman Empire and made very powerful enemies while preaching a philosophy of peace and love." After a lengthy quotation from the conservative journalist Vermont C. Royster, the introduction concludes: "But the incredible story behind the lethal struggle between good and evil has not been fully told. Until now." The first chapter begins with a novelistic description of the Massacre of the Innocents from Matthew 2 (Matthew 2:16–18). The remaining portion of the chapter focusses on Herod the Great, the king of Judaea, the politics of his reign, the visit of the Magi, and the birth of Jesus. A lengthy footnote at the end of the chapter defends the historical accuracy of the canonical gospels and their traditional attributions to Matthew the Apostle, John Mark, Luke the Evangelist, and John the Apostle.

The second chapter describes the life of the Roman general and dictator Julius Caesar, his conquests, his seduction by the Egyptian Ptolemaic queen Cleopatra, and his eventual assassination. Chapter Three summarizes the aftermath of Caesar's murder, the Battle of Philippi, the Second Triumvirate, Octavian's defeat of Mark Antony and Cleopatra in the Battle of Actium, and Octavian's ascension to the title of emperor. The fourth chapter returns to the life of Jesus, describing his worried parents looking for him after he has gone missing during a trip to Jerusalem for the Passover. It describes some of the politics of Roman Judaea, heavily emphasizing the idea that the Jews were victims of Roman totalitarian oppression. Chapter Five describes the finding in the Temple from Luke 2 (Luke 2:41–52), the architecture of the Temple in Jerusalem, Nazareth, and the government and political background of Galilee.

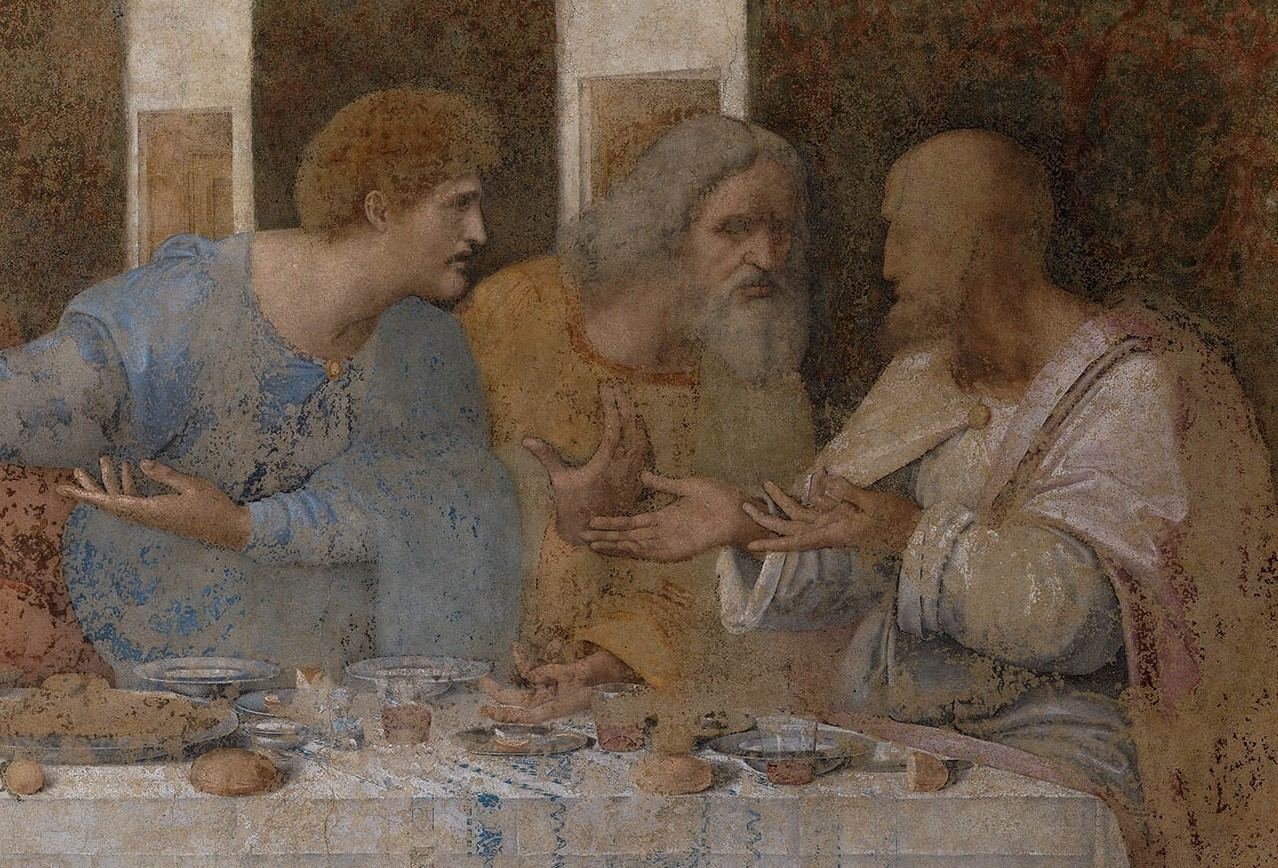
Detail of three disciples on the far left side of the table in Leonardo da Vinci's Last Supper, who are shown in a black and white photograph on page 219 of Killing Jesus

Chapter Six describes the preaching of John the Baptist, the arrival of Pontius Pilate in Judaea, the baptism of Jesus, and John the Baptist's arrest. Chapter Seven describes the alleged debaucheries of the Roman emperor Tiberius at Capri, described by the Roman historian Seutonius, accepting all of them as historical. Chapter Eight narrates the Cleansing of the Temple from John 2 (John 2:13–16), Jesus's meeting with Nicodemus from John 3 (John 3:1–21), and the beginning of his ministry. Chapter Nine details the calling of the apostles, the Sermon on the Mount, and the anointing of Jesus from Luke 7 (Luke 7:36–50). Following Catholic tradition rather than the gospels, the authors identify the unnamed "sinful woman" in this passage as Mary Magdalene. The chapter concludes with the beheading of John the Baptist. Chapter Ten entails Jesus's conflicts with the Pharisees and Sadducees and concludes with a characterization of Judas Iscariot.

Chapter Eleven describes Pontius Pilate's governance of Judaea and Chapter Twelve Jesus's entry to Jerusalem. In Chapter Thirteen, Jesus cleanses the Temple again and curses the fig tree. In Chapter Fourteen, he goes to the house of Mary and Martha, proclaims the Golden Rule, tells the Pharisees to "Render unto Caesar", weeps over Jerusalem, and predicts his own death. Chapter Fifteen has the betrayal of Judas and Chapter Sixteen has the Last Supper, the Agony in the Garden, and the arrest of Jesus. Chapters Seventeen through Nineteen describe Jesus's trial, crucifixion, and burial. Chapter Twenty-One has the account of the women at the tomb. The "Afterword" describes non-Christian mentions of Jesus, the fates of the Apostles according to Catholic tradition, as well as what happened to Tiberius, Caligula, Caiaphas, Herod Antipas, Jerusalem, and the early Christian movement.

== Publication and sales ==
Upon its publication, Killing Jesus debuted at number one on The New York Times bestseller list, and was on the list for 52 weeks. Killing Jesus surpassed the sales of the book Zealot: The Life and Times of Jesus of Nazareth by Reza Aslan, a professor of creative writing, which had been published only a few months before. Of its sales success, The Washington Post wrote, "The most popular titles in the Washington area have a distinctly biblical glow: for the second week in a row, Killing Jesus by Bill O'Reilly and Martin Dugard is No. 1. This is the third in their spectacularly successful assassination series, following Killing Kennedy and Killing Lincoln." Noting the concurrent popularity of other religion-related books, the article concludes, "Publishers have long known that religion sells. Even in Washington."

== Reception ==
=== Popular reviews ===
In its fall books preview, USA Today called it "a suspenseful thriller." A review of the book by Erik Wemple in The Washington Post remarked that Killing Jesus and its predecessors "may not advance the scholarship on their respective topics, but who'll take issue with millions of Americans getting a quick-read tutorial on history via O’Reilly?" Nonetheless, Wemple complained that the book's writing was full of annoying verbal tics. In particular, Wemple criticizes O'Reilly's constant countdown of how much time the person he is writing about has left to live and his use of the phrase "so it is that..." at the beginnings of sentences. Wemple calls the phrase a "a four-word clump of throat-clearing mumbo-jumbo" and states that another reviewer counted roughly sixteen or so occurrences of it in Killing Jesus. Wemple speculates that O'Reilly may have intended this phrase as "a retroactive cliché, a little riff that would sound impressive in a book about antiquity."

In the book, O'Reilly and Dugard state that they are only including events that can be proven as historical fact, a claim which has drawn criticism from both critics of Christianity and evangelical Christians. A 2013 review by Dan Delzell for The Christian Post criticizes this statement for implying that not everything in the gospels can be proven as historical fact. Instead, the reviewer insists that everything in the gospel accounts is demonstrably factual and that O'Reilly's selective omission of stories found in the gospels from his book is tantamount to "cut[ting] Christ in half." A review by Tim Chaffey from Answers in Genesis criticizes the book for deliberately omitting several of Jesus's miracles and glossing over others. The same review criticized the book for its "graphic description of sexual activity" and for portraying Mary Magdalene as a repentant prostitute, an idea that is not based on the Bible.

In an article for Salon, Robert M. Price, an atheist theologian and self-identified fan of Bill O'Reilly, labels Killing Jesus a work of complete fiction comparable to The Da Vinci Code and states,

There is no sign whatsoever that the authors of "Killing Jesus" have even begun to do their homework here. In the end notes, true, we find a number of book recommendations, but it is revealing that virtually every one of the New Testament and Jesus books mentioned are the work of evangelical/fundamentalist spin doctors dedicated to defending the proposition that the gospels are entirely accurate, miracles and all.

A 2015 review of both the book and the television miniseries based on it by Brook Wilensky-Lanford in The Guardian criticizes O'Reilly for accepting Jesus's alleged miracles as potentially historical and remarks that, although O'Reilly claims to treat his subject objectively, he "can't be trusted not to confuse religious interpretation with historical fact."

=== Scholarly response ===
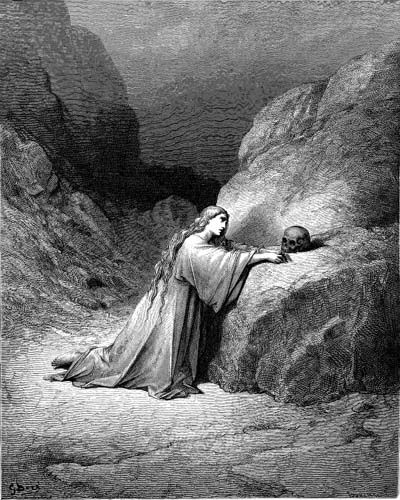
Nineteenth-century illustration of Mary Magdalene as a repentant prostitute by Gustave Doré, which appears in Killing Jesus. Candida Moss criticizes the book for accepting this portrayal of Mary, which is not supported by the Bible or other early Christian writings.

Candida Moss, a professor of New Testament and early Christianity at the University of Notre Dame, criticizes the book for its many historical inaccuracies in two articles written in September and October 2013 for The Daily Beast and CNN respectively. Moss states that, although O'Reilly and Dugard do attempt to separate between fact and fiction, they do so inconsistently and accordingly to their previously held beliefs. In her Daily Beast article, she states: "...without a method, Killing Jesus has all the critical rigor of your local church's Nativity play." She notes that O'Reilly and Dugard accept late, unsubstantiated legends about the fates of the apostles after the period covered by the New Testament as historical fact. They also uncritically accept the legend formalized in the fifth century by Pope Gregory I about Mary Magdalene having previously been a prostitute, which is not supported by the New Testament or any early Christian writings, but ignore the statement actually recorded in the gospels that Mary Magdalene was one of the people funding Jesus's ministry. They include statements from John the Baptist accusing tax collectors of overcharging people, but omit all reference to Jesus's repeated injunctions to "support the poor, orphans, and widows" as well as to the saying, "whoever has two coats must share with anyone who has none; and whoever has food must do likewise" (Luke 3:11).

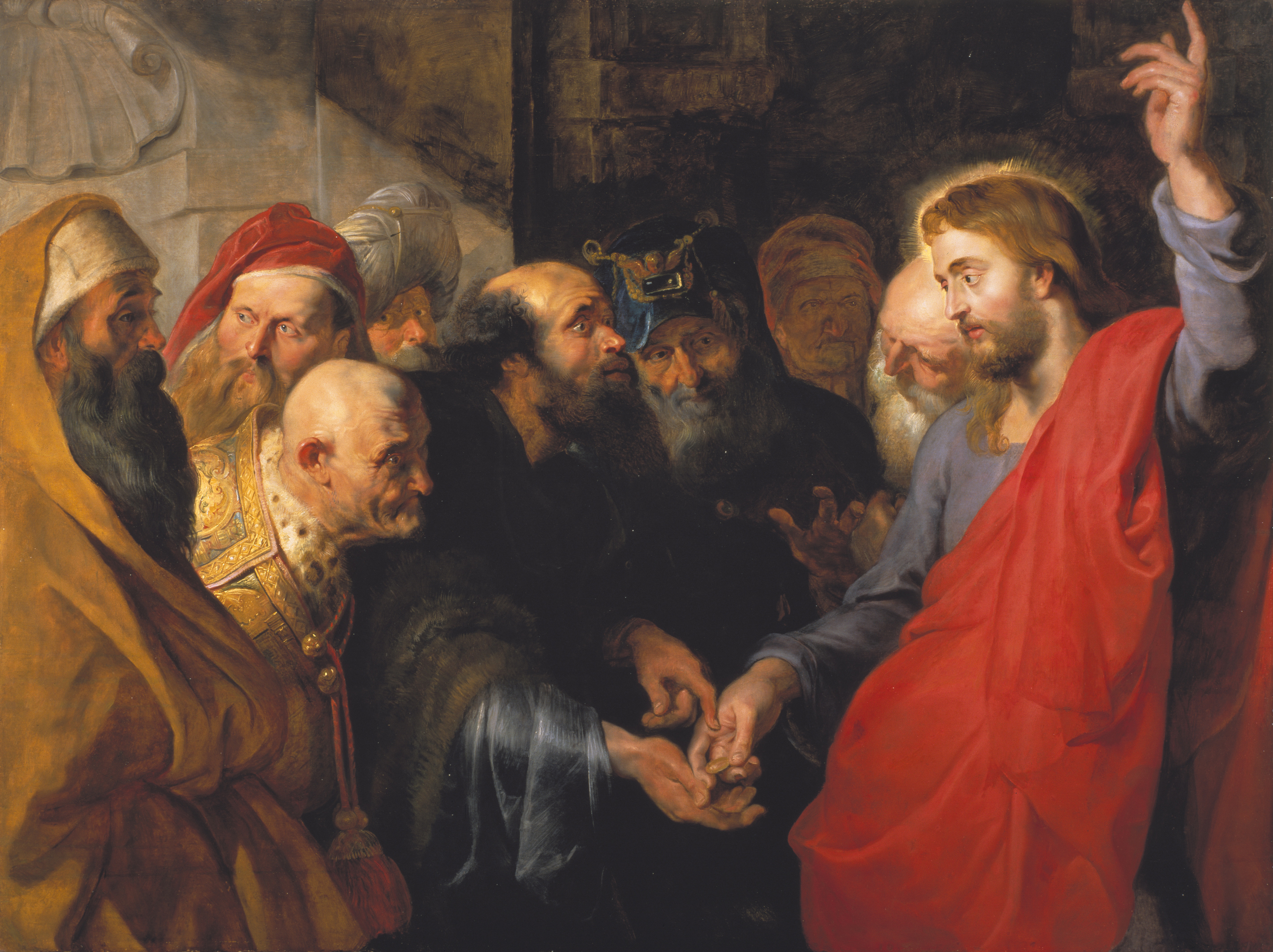
The Tribute Money (1612–1614) by Peter Paul Rubens. One of many recurring criticisms of the book is its portrayal of the Pharisees as what Moss calls "self-righteous bloviators", a view which is no longer supported by mainstream scholars.

In her CNN article, Moss cites the example of how they omit the line "Father, forgive them, for they know not what they do", which Luke 23:34 attributes to Jesus as he was being crucified, because, as O'Reilly later said in a CBS interview, it is impossible to speak audibly while a person is being crucified. She then points out that they chose not to omit the line "It is finished", also attributed to Jesus while he was on the cross, in John 19:30. Moss suggests that perhaps "there [is just] something about the word 'forgiveness' that sticks in [their throats]". She also criticizes them for taking everything written by Roman historians like Suetonius and Josephus completely at face value, as though these writers were totally unbiased. She also particularly criticizes O'Reilly and Dugard's portrayal of the Pharisees as "self-righteous bloviators", stating that modern biblical scholars no longer view them this way, and that this portrayal is, ironically, based more on the stereotype of Roman Catholics promoted by Protestants during the Reformation and early modern period than on actual ancient texts.

Moss states that Killing Jesus's description of the apostle Paul converting to "Christianity" is anachronistic because, at the time, Christianity was still a Jewish sect and the word Christian was not even coined until near the end of the first century. Instead, she says "the first generation of Jesus' followers lived and died as Jews." Moss also notes O'Reilly and Dugard's unusual interpretations of various passages, such as Luke 3:17, which O'Reilly and Dugard apparently interpret to mean that John the Baptist told the Pharisees that they will either "burn or be condemned to Hell." She concludes: "Apart from the methodological problems, the entire book is written in the style of a novel, not a history book. We hear the thoughts of Herod as he orders the execution of the male children of Bethlehem, for instance. It's entertaining, but it's historical fan fiction, not history."

In an article from November 2013, Joel L. Watts, author of Mimetic Criticism and the Gospel of Mark, calls Killing Jesus nothing more than "an attempt at agenda-driven drivel produced for the lowest common denominator." He adds, "I wish I had my day back." In addition to raising many of the same accuracy concerns as Moss, Watts also criticizes the book for imputing post-Enlightenment ideas of individualism to ancient Galileean Jews and for referring to the Sadducees (who believed that the Torah was the only authoritative scripture and opposed the more progressive theology promoted by the Pharisees) as "liberals". He also criticizes a statement that the canon of the Hebrew Bible had been established "500 years" before Jesus, when, in reality, many of the books in the Hebrew Bible were not written until after that point and the canon of the Hebrew Bible was still debated long after Jesus's death. Watts accuses the authors of being arrogant and dismissive of the opinions of actual experts. He determines that "they destroy context and literary construction to, and I can only assume this based on the evidence of reading the book, hide the actual message of the Gospels."

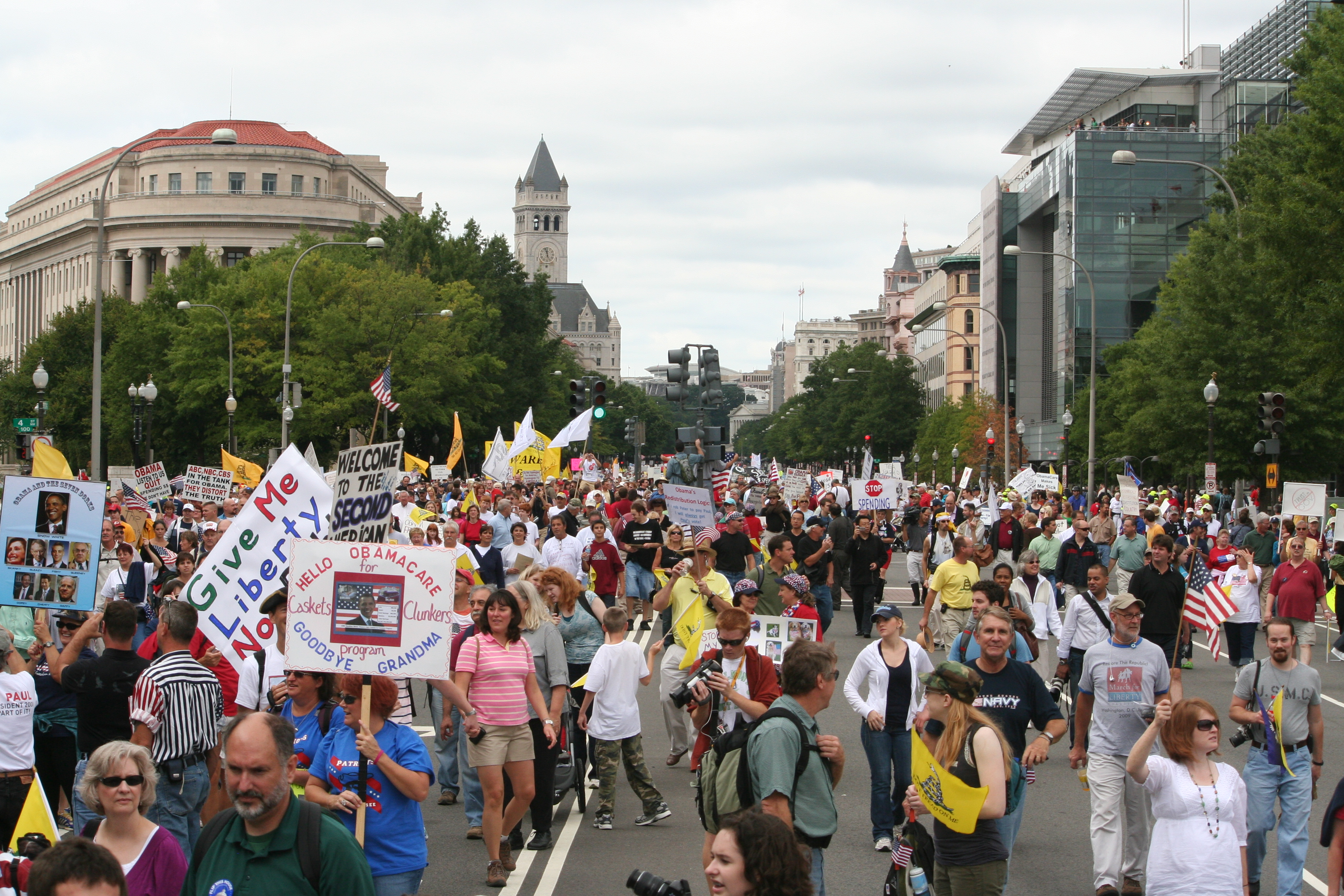
Numerous scholars have criticized Killing Jesus for its anachronistic portrayal of Jesus as an advocate of "smaller government and lower taxes" similar to the supporters of the United States Tea Party movement (protest pictured), rather than the first-century Galilean Jew he really was.

A December 2013 review in The Guardian by Selina O'Grady, author of And Man Created God: Kings, Cults, and Conquests at the Time of Jesus, remarks that,

Everyone creates God in their own image, so it's not surprising that Fox television's aggressively conservative down-home-let's-hear-it-for-the-ordinary-guy talk show host should have created a Tea Party son of God. Jesus, the little guy, is an enemy of the big corrupt tax-oppressing Roman empire, which is itself just a version of Washington, only even more venal and sexually depraved. This Jesus is a tax-liberating rebel who incurs the wrath of the Jewish and Roman powers by threatening their joint fleecing of the people. As a member of the populist right, he is not, of course, in favour of redistribution: Bill O'Reilly's Jesus does not tell the rich to give away their money to the poor.

The same review criticizes Killing Jesus for its "bodice-ripping treatment of history", stating that the book oversimplifies, sensationalizes, and misrepresents the historical events it purports to describe. According to O'Grady, Killing Jesus presents the Romans, Jewish elites, and Pharisees as categorically "bad" and "ordinary Jews" as "good", without any background or nuance. O'Grady also criticizes O'Reilly and Dugard for relying almost entirely on the gospels and ignoring the centuries' worth of books written by biblical scholars about the historical Jesus.

Bart D. Ehrman, James A. Gray Distinguished Professor of religious studies at the University of North Carolina at Chapel Hill, particularly criticized the introduction's claim that the novel was historical and that "The Romans kept incredible records of the time, and a few Jewish historians in Palestine also wrote down the events of the day," with the implication that Killing Jesus was based on such neutral records. Ehrman writes that this claim is false; surviving non-Christian classical records of Jesus's time are essentially just a single paragraph from Josephus, the Testimonium Flavianum, and that the authors should have been honest about writing a novel solely based on the gospels. In his 2016 book Jesus Before the Gospels, Ehrman wryly noted that O'Reilly is "obviously... not a New Testament scholar." In both his lectures and the book, Ehrman implicitly criticizes O'Reilly's portrayal of the historical Jesus as an advocate of "smaller government and lower taxes." In the book, he adds, "It is easy to see how this view of Jesus might resonate with a wide swath of our population today."

== Television adaptation ==
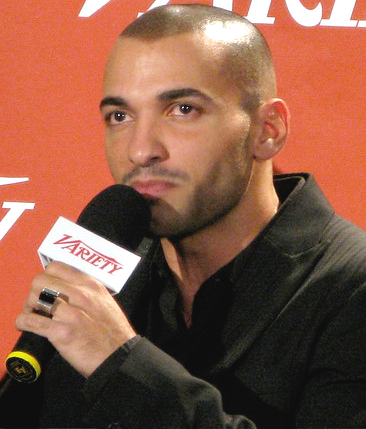
Lebanese-American actor Haaz Sleiman portrayed Jesus in the Killing Jesus television film.

National Geographic picked up the television adaptation of Killing Jesus, just as it had for Killing Lincoln and Killing Kennedy. In March 2014, it was announced Killing Jesus was being adapted into a four-hour miniseries, and Walon Green has been tapped to write and executive produce the project. Also returning as executive producers are Ridley Scott, David W. Zucker, and Mary Lisio, who previously produced Killing Kennedy. In August 2014, Christopher Menaul was attached to direct the miniseries.

On its premiere airing, the film was watched by 3.7 million viewers, averaging a 1.0 rating among adults in the 25–54 demographic. The viewership surpassed the record previously held by Killing Kennedy. A review on Yahoo TV by Ken Tucker said of the film,

Rendered without much embellishment and acted with firmly controlled vigor, Killing Jesus, a TV adaptation of the bestselling book by Bill O'Reilly and Martin Dugard, is a fine retelling of the story of Jesus Christ as a historical figure. That last phrase is key. O'Reilly and his co-author sought to write only what they considered provable historical facts about Christ. Whether this has been accomplished I'll leave to historians and theologians ...

A glowing review by Hannah Goodwin for the Christian Broadcasting Network praised the film for its authentic-looking set and costumes and called it "a conversation starter". The review suggested, "Presenting Jesus' life and death from a largely historical perspective could open this religious history to wider audiences."

A review by Neil Genzlinger in The New York Times, however, panned the film, declaring, "It's a costume pageant devoid both of the reverence that has made some previous film versions work and of the intrigue that might provide a secular Game of Thrones–like appeal. More effort went into the jewelry and headwear than into the storytelling." The same review compared the miniseries unfavorably with the book, stating, "The book tried to put Jesus' story in the broader context of the politics and practices of the day, but here the account is largely pared down to the biblical rendition, with Jesus casting out a demon, preventing the stoning of a woman accused of adultery and delivering the touchstone teachings that all Christians know by heart."
