= Inside 9/11 =

- DVD cover art
- Genre: Documentary; History
- Country of origin: United States
- Original language: English
- No. of episodes: 3

Production
- Running time: 255 minutes

Original release
- Network: National Geographic Channel
- Release: August 21 – August 22, 2005

Inside 9/11 is a three-part television documentary film produced by Towers Productions that premiered on August 21 and August 22, 2005, on the National Geographic Channel. The program covers the September 11 attacks in 2001, the events that led to it, and its aftermath. The first part consisted of examining, event by event, the build-up towards September 11. The second part consisted of the events of 9/11 itself and the aftermath. Experts and eyewitnesses provide their accounts of the attacks, and the events are covered in chronological order.

Inside 9/11 was the highest-rated program ever on the National Geographic Channel and was nominated for an Emmy in 2006.

On August 27, 2006, the documentary was released again with details about Zacarias Moussaoui and Able Danger.

On May 7, 2011, the third part was released with details on the death of Osama bin Laden and the rise of attacks inspired by other leaders such as Anwar al-Awlaki, who is suspected of preparing three of the 9/11 hijackers in San Diego and Virginia.

== Parts ==
=== War on America ===
The first part covers the pre-9/11 events leading up to the forthcoming terrorist attacks. It opens with the 1993 WTC Bombing and then explores the Soviet–Afghan War along with Osama bin Laden, the formation of al-Qaeda, the planning of the Planes Operation, and the choosing of its operatives.

=== Zero Hour ===
The second part covers the unfolding events of September 11, 2001. It opens with the 5:43 a.m. check-in of two Flight 11 hijackers at Portland International Jetport. It explores the following events: impacts of Flight 11 into the World Trade Center at 8:46 a.m., Flight 175 into World Trade Center 2 at 9:03 a.m., Flight 77 into the Pentagon at 9:37 a.m. and United 93 in Stonycreek Township, Pennsylvania at 10:03 a.m.; the collapse of World Trade Center 2 at 9:59 a.m., the collapse of the Pentagon's E-ring at 10:15 a.m., and the collapse of World Trade Center 1 at 10:28 a.m.—it however, fails to mention the collapse of World Trade Center 7 at 5:20 p.m. It also briefly explores attacks taking place after 9/11.

=== The War Continues ===
The third part covers the post-9/11 events leading up to the killing of Osama bin Laden. It begins with the raid of bin Laden's compound, and then explores several related terrorist attacks, including the 2002 Bali bombings, 2004 Madrid train bombings, the assassination of Nick Berg, the 7 July 2005 London bombings, 2008 Mumbai attacks, and the 2009 Fort Hood shooting. It ends with the death of Osama bin Laden in Abbottabad, Pakistan. It explores the life of Anwar al-Awlaki and his involvement in 9/11. Al-Awlaki was killed on September 30, 2011 in a drone strike.

== Featured details ==
In MacDill Air Force Base, a Military Committee is reviewing an unusual chart known as Able Danger, which allowed Mohamed Atta and Marwan al-Shehhi to travel across the U.S. without being caught because they hold valid U.S. Visas and may be off Intelligence Gathering by the military and the FBI.

Zacarias Moussaoui, the alleged "twentieth hijacker", is in U.S. custody for the foreseeable future as he is arrested on an immigration charge and the role to fly a plane into the White House if not being arrested four weeks prior to 9/11. He is the only person to date to be charged in relation to the 9/11 attacks.

The supervising producer was Nicole Rittenmeyer.

On the TV Ad on September 16, 2007, National Geographic Channel announced this documentary re-air on September 17, 2007 at 10pm using Singapore's StarHub TV. After the show, it was aired again on September 24, 2007.
