= Killing Patton =

2014 book written by Bill O'Reilly and Martin Dugard

- Author: Bill O'Reilly and Martin Dugard
- Subject: Death of General George Patton
- Publisher: Henry Holt and Co.
- Publication date: September 23, 2014
- Media type: Hardcover
- Pages: 368
- ISBN: 978-0805096682

Killing Patton: The Strange Death of World War II's Most Audacious General is a book written by Bill O'Reilly and Martin Dugard about the final year of World War II and the death of General George Patton, specifically whether it was an accident or an assassination. The book is the follow-up to Killing Kennedy, Killing Lincoln, and Killing Jesus and was published in September 2014 through Henry Holt and Company.

== Disputed theory ==
O'Reilly suggests that Patton was poisoned while recovering from the automobile accident he endured on December 8, 1945, on the orders of Soviet dictator Joseph Stalin, ostensibly to prevent him from warning the United States about the imminent danger of the Soviet Union. "I think Stalin killed him," O'Reilly told George Stephanopoulos on the ABC news program This Week.

Media Matters for America reported that several historians found O'Reilly's theory highly implausible. Rick Atkinson, a two-time winner of the Pulitzer Prize, told the progressive news organization that Patton died of complications following "a fender bender." "You've got to look at what Patton's situation was," said Carlo D'Este, the author of Patton: A Genius for War. "He was a quadriplegic, he was going to die anyway, he was totally immobilized, he couldn't move. What is the point of assassinating him and where did Stalin come from anyway? Sure, somebody could have snuck in the hospital, but why would you bother? You need to verify facts. That certainly raises a red flag with me."

Patton's grandson, Robert Patton, also rejected the suggestion of assassination. "The theory is he either died naturally or from a blood clot," he said. "You're paralyzed, and this is what happens."

== Reception ==
Writing in The Washington Post, Richard Cohen criticized the book's "chaotic structure" and "considerable padding," calling the work a "clunky hagiography." Cohen was especially critical of O'Reilly's "repellent admiration" for Patton in light of his demonstrable anti-Semitism. In The New Republic, James Wolcott dismissed the book as O'Reilly's "latest papier-mâché exercise in necrobiography." Patton biographer and documentary filmmaker Robert Orlando described Killing Patton and O'Reilly's "Killing" series as "not about new or penetrating discovery, but the same ol' same ol' only through this greatly successful marketer and his hired writer—a scheduled feeding for an audience already 'on the farm.'"

By contrast, Wes Vernon wrote in The Washington Times that "Killing Patton is rich in blow-by-blow accounts of some of the most significant battles of World War II, as well as of many off-battlefield lives of its primary movers whose personalities virtually come to life in this well-crafted narrative."

== Sales ==
On his June 24, 2015 segment of The O'Reilly Factor, O'Reilly claimed that Killing Patton was "the bestselling tome ... in 2014." Publishers Weekly subsequently pointed out that according to Nielsen BookScan, Killing Patton "was the fifth bestselling print book of 2014, behind The Fault in Our Stars by John Green, Diary of a Wimpy Kid: The Long Haul by Jeff Kinney, and Divergent and Insurgent by Veronica Roth."

== Scrapped adaptation ==
On November 24, 2015, National Geographic Channel and Scott Free Productions jointly announced the television adaptation of Killing Patton. Anthony Peckham was attached to write the four-hour teleplay. Following O'Reilly's departure from Fox News in April 2017, it was announced the film was still in development with a scheduled release in 2019. However, in June 2017, National Geographic announced the cancellation of the project. The network stated that "It was in development for a couple of years, and it was a difficult project to crack creatively" and that "Like most projects in development, it didn't go the distance, so we passed on it." This is the first of O'Reilly's projects that National Geographic has passed on.
