= Killing Reagan =

2015 popular history book

- Author: Bill O'Reilly and Martin Dugard
- Language: English
- Subject: Attempted assassination of Ronald Reagan
- Publisher: Henry Holt and Co.
- Publication date: September 22, 2015
- Publication place: United States
- Media type: Hardcover
- Pages: 336
- ISBN: 978-1627792417

Killing Reagan: The Violent Assault That Changed a Presidency is a book written by Bill O'Reilly and Martin Dugard about the attempted assassination of U.S. president Ronald Reagan in 1981. It is the fifth in the Killing series, following Killing Lincoln, Killing Kennedy, Killing Jesus, and Killing Patton. The book was released on September 22, 2015, and topped The New York Times Best Sellers List.

== Plot ==
In 1981, after delivering a speech at the Washington Hilton Hotel on March 30, President Reagan is shot by John Hinckley Jr. Near death, Reagan's life is in the balance in the hands of doctors at George Washington University Hospital. At the White House, however, there is chaos as Reagan's cabinet is led by Secretary of State Alexander Haig.

== Adaptation ==
On September 26, 2015, about a week after the book's release, National Geographic announced that a television film adaptation was in development. In May 2016, it was announced that Tim Matheson and Cynthia Nixon had been cast as Ronald and Nancy Reagan respectively. Filming began in late May. It premiered October 16, 2016.

== Criticism ==
Following the release of Killing Reagan, Reagan biographers Craig Shirley, Steven Hayward, Paul Kengor, and Kiron Skinner, along with a handful of former Reagan aides, immediately began to challenge the book on its factual inaccuracies and historical fabrications. Those four Reagan biographers, who had written 19 biographies on Ronald Reagan among them, penned an op-ed for The Washington Post on October 16 that highlighted what they claimed to be major historical inaccuracies and outright fabrications used in O'Reilly's book. Additional criticisms surfaced from officials that served in the Reagan Administration, who were present at the events discussed in the book, yet dispute what actually happened. A. B. Culvahouse, who served as counsel to the president from 1987 to 1989, calls one of the key anecdotes of O'Reilly's book describing a meeting focused on President Reagan's fitness to hold office "a debunked myth."

In response, O'Reilly took to the airwaves on October 19, responding to the criticism and calling his critics "zealots and jealous people." He also called the criticisms "comical," to which Reagan historian Shirley responded "So far, I've written four books on Ronald Reagan, written dozens of articles, given dozens of lectures, am a trustee of Eureka College, taught a course there [titled] Reagan 101, and have lectured at the Reagan Library and the Reagan Ranch. [I]t is fair to say we probably know a little bit more about Ronald Reagan than Bill O'Reilly. We certainly know the facts of Ronald Reagan."

The following day, Ed Meese, who served as counselor to the president (1981–1985) and Attorney General (1985–1988), penned a joint op-ed with Ronald Reagan Presidential Foundation executive director John Heubusch detailed more inaccuracies in O'Reilly's book, saying "we believe that Killing Reagan does a real disservice to our 40th president and to history itself." The same day, Frank Donatelli, President Reagan's assistant for political and intergovernmental affairs, also penned an op-ed for The Washington Times disputing O'Reilly's key thesis as another discredited "senility myth" about Ronald Reagan.

More criticisms came from reporters at The Washington Post, who looked into O'Reilly's claim to have "double-sourced everything" in his book. On October 19, 2015, about a month after the book was published, O'Reilly's researcher first reached out to the Ronald Reagan Presidential Library to obtain a document that O'Reilly himself called a "key part of the book." On October 21, it was reported that Annelise Anderson, the fact-checker that O'Reilly and Dugard commissioned to research and fact-check the manuscript for Killing Reagan, pulled out of the project after realizing that the authors were "distorting" material, in her opinion. In an op-ed published in National Review, she further stated, "Why the authors want to present this distorted 'witch and wimp' view of Nancy [Reagan] and the 40th president is puzzling, especially since an alternative view of the effect of Reagan's near-death experience is so readily available."

Conservative commentator George Will called the book a work of "nonsensical history and execrable citizenship." He added that it "should come with a warning: 'Caution—you are about to enter a no-facts zone.'"
