= Killing Kennedy =

2012 non-fiction book by Bill O'Reilly and Martin Dugard

- First edition cover
- Author: Bill O'Reilly and Martin Dugard
- Subject: Assassination of John F. Kennedy
- Publisher: Henry Holt and Company
- Publication date: October 2, 2012
- Media type: Hardcover
- Pages: 336
- ISBN: 0805096663
- Preceded by: Killing Lincoln
- Followed by: Killing Jesus

Killing Kennedy: The End of Camelot is a 2012 non-fiction book by Bill O'Reilly and Martin Dugard about the assassination of the 35th president of the United States John F. Kennedy. It is a follow-up to O'Reilly's 2011 book Killing Lincoln. Killing Kennedy was released on October 2, 2012 through Henry Holt and Company.

== Synopsis ==
In Killing Kennedy the authors narrate the events leading up to the assassination of President Kennedy as well as the event's aftermath. O'Reilly and Dugard also focus on the element of the growing Cold War, Kennedy's attempt to deal with the rise of Communism, and the potential threat from organized crime.

== Reception ==
Critical response to Killing Kennedy was mixed, with The New York Times writing that the book was at times disappointing but that it "picks up strength as it heads for its date with destiny". The book has been criticized for a "lack of citation and occasional 'literary liberties'".

O'Reilly has stated that he and Dugard wrote the book to be "fun" and "to get people engaged with their country". The book sold 118,000 copies in its first week.

Another passage where O'Reilly claims he was present outside the Florida home of alleged conspirator George de Mohrenschildt when he committed suicide has been shown by several sources to be false, as he was known not to be in the state at the time. In response, the publisher Henry Holt and Company issued a statement: "This one passage is immaterial to the story being told by this terrific book and we have no plans to look into this matter."

== Adaptation ==
After the success of Killing Lincoln, National Geographic Channel announced it would produce a film adaptation of Killing Kennedy. In May 2013, it was announced that Rob Lowe was to play President John F. Kennedy, Ginnifer Goodwin would play First Lady Jacqueline Kennedy, and Michelle Trachtenberg would portray Lee Harvey Oswald's wife Marina Oswald. The television film premiered on November 10, 2013. On its original airing, it drew in 3,354,000 viewers, averaging a 1.1 rating with adults in the 25-54 demographic. The viewership broke the record previously held by Killing Lincoln which averaged 3,351,000 viewers.
