= Killing Lincoln =

2011 popular history book

- Author: Bill O'Reilly; Martin Dugard
- Subject: Assassination of Abraham Lincoln
- Publisher: Henry Holt and Co.
- Publication date: September 27, 2011
- Media type: Hardcover
- Pages: 336
- ISBN: 978-0-8050-9307-0
- Followed by: Killing Kennedy

Killing Lincoln: The Shocking Assassination That Changed America Forever is a book by Bill O'Reilly and Martin Dugard concerning the 1865 assassination of U.S. president Abraham Lincoln. The book was released on September 27, 2011, and is the first of the Killing series of popular history books by O'Reilly and Dugard.

O'Reilly indicated in a USA Today interview that his coauthor Martin Dugard has written several history books. O'Reilly himself graduated with a Bachelor of Arts degree in history from Marist College in 1971 as well as a master's degree in broadcast journalism from Boston University and master's degree in public administration from Harvard University.

== Reception ==
As of 14 November 2011, Killing Lincoln was among Amazon's best sellers and at number two on the New York Times list of best-selling non-fiction. It also held the number one spot on the New York Times E-Book Nonfiction list for multiple weeks. In late October 2011, the publisher, Henry Holt and Co., stated that Killing Lincoln had sold nearly a million copies. On the November 14, 2011 edition of The O'Reilly Factor, O'Reilly told his television audience that "there are now more than 1 million copies of Killing Lincoln in print, and the book continues to sell briskly." By December 2012, the New York Times reported the book had been on their best-seller list for more than 65 weeks.

== Criticism ==
During the book's initial release, Rae Emerson, the deputy superintendent of Ford's Theatre National Historic Site, conducted a review of the book's text and discovered a number of inaccuracies, which she described as "factual errors" and listed as numbering ten, each different and one additionally occurring multiple times. As a result of the review, the National Park Service, which manages Ford's Theatre, made the decision not to allow the edition of the book containing the errors to be sold at the Eastern National Bookstore located in the Museum at Ford's Theatre National Historic Site, although it is sold in a gift shop in the lobby that is operated independently by the Ford's Theatre Society. Historian Edward Steers has also criticized the book in a review for various inaccuracies and for lending support to conspiracy theories.

In response to Emerson's review, O'Reilly said that the mistakes, which he numbered less than her findings at just "four minor misstatements" and "two typeset errors", had been corrected in subsequent printings. O'Reilly called the controversy "a concerted effort by people who don’t like me to diminish the book," said that Killing Lincoln was "honest," and wished all students would read it.

=== Errors in first edition ===
English-language, first-edition hardcover print copies containing errata material can be identified as such if they contain the following:

- Page 3: The man with six weeks to live is anxious. He furls his brow, as he does countless times each day ...

("Furl" means to wrap or roll around a pole, as to store a sail, flag, or umbrella; "furrow" means to create rows or wrinkles, as on the forehead.)

- Page 83: Grant and Lee rise simultaneously and shake hands. The two warriors will never meet again.

(After their meeting on April 9, 1865 in which Lee surrendered at the Appomattox Court House in Virginia, Grant and Lee met again the next day to discuss paroles for Lee's Confederate troops, so that they would not be arrested or harassed.)

- Page 104: Not the least bit discouraged, Booth walks up to Ford's Theatre on Tenth Street. After it was burned to the ground in 1863, owner John Ford rebuilt it ...

(The fire occurred on December 30, 1862 and gutted the interior, leaving the outer walls intact. The authors later correctly state on page 159: When Ford's Athenaeum was destroyed by fire in 1862 ...).

- Page 131: That afternoon, Grant meets with Lincoln in the Oval Office.

(The Oval Office was not built until 1909, 44 years after Lincoln's death.)

- Page 146: By nine A.M., President Lincoln is sitting at his desk in the Oval Office.

(The Oval Office was not built until 1909, 44 years after Lincoln's death.)

- Page 154: Now, between Oval Office appointments, Lincoln summons a messenger.

(The Oval Office was not built until 1909, 44 years after Lincoln's death.)

- Page 160: The state box, where the Lincolns and Grants will sit this evening, is almost on the stage itself – so close that if Lincoln were to impulsively rise from his rocking chair and leap into the actors' midst, the distance traveled would be a mere nine feet.

(Depending on which end of the box the measurement is taken from, the distance from the state box to the stage below is 11 1/2 to 12 feet.)

- Page 160: On nights when the Lincolns are in attendance, the partition is removed. Red, white, and blue bunting is draped over the railing and a portrait of George Washington faces out at the audience, designating that the president of the United States is in the house.

(Ford added the portrait of George Washington for the first time on April 14, 1865, the day of the assassination.)

- Page 160: Like many actors, he spends so much time on the road that he doesn't have a permanent address. So Ford's Opera House, as the theater is formally known, is his permanent address.

(The formal name of the theatre at the time of the assassination was "Ford's Theatre". Before that, after the 1863 renovation, it was called "Ford's New Theatre".)

- Page 160: ... an Our American Cousin rehearsal is taking place ... . The show has been presented eight previous time at Ford’s ...

(It was performed seven previous times: The eighth was the night of the assassination.)

- Page 161: ... stage carpenter James J. Clifford bounds into the room ... Clifford is estatic ...

(His last name was Gifford.)

- Page 161: Booth has performed here often and is more familiar with its hidden backstage tunnels ...

(According to Rae Emerson, deputy superintendent at Ford’s Theatre, this description in the book is inaccurate: There are passageways and stairways backstage, known to and routinely used by the cast, crew, and musicians. O'Reilly admits, however, on page 3 that Killing Lincoln is "written in the style of a thriller", so arguably his choice of words could be viewed in that dramatic spirit, as such backstage areas would technically be hidden from the audience and Mr. and Mrs. Lincoln, who were in attendance)

- Page 195: Booth’s second act of preparation that afternoon was using a pen knife to carve a very small peephole in the back wall of the state box. Now he looks through the hole to get a better view of the president...

(No evidence has ever been found to prove Booth carved a peephole. There is an after-the-fact 1962 letter from the son of Henry Clay Ford, brother of John T. Ford, the theatre's owner, insisting that his father had the hole bored so that the guard could check on the presidential party without having to open the door.)

- Page 242: But Mudd's five-hundred-acre estate ...

(It was 217 acres.)

- Page 278: Mary Surratt ... claustrophobia and disfigurement caused by the hood ... One eyewitness called her cell aboard the Montauk "barely habitable."

(Unlike the other accused co-conspirators, Mary Surratt was never held aboard the U.S.S. Montauk and she never wore a hood during her confinement at the Old Capitol Prison, nor in federal prison at the Washington Arsenal, where she was eventually hanged.)

Additional errors of fact were listed in a review by historian Kate Larson of the University of Michigan. While finding fault with the accuracy of the work at times, Larson notably adds, "well-written narrative offering a quick read for a general audience.... Writing for a general audience requires skills that are not taught or encouraged in graduate history programs across the country, which is unfortunate."

== Television adaptation ==
O'Reilly told USA Today in a phone interview published in the September 29, 2011 issue that he talked with producers ("big hitters") about turning the book into a cable television special.

Tony Scott was working on adapting the book for the National Geographic Channel when he committed suicide on August 19, 2012. Production had already begun in Richmond, Virginia. In the film Virginia Repertory Theatre's November Theatre represented Fords Theatre. The film aired on National Geographic Channel on February 17, 2013 hosted and narrated by Tom Hanks. The docudrama was aired in memorial tribute to Tony Scott. The television film averaged 3.4 million viewers, scoring about 1 million viewers in the 25-54 demographic. It was National Geographic's highest-rated television airing surpassing Inside 9/11, which drew 3 million in August 2005. The record was broken by Killing Kennedy, which drew in 3,354,000 viewers while Lincoln took 3,351,000.
