= Martin Dugard (author) =

American author

- Born: June 1, 1961 (age 65); Maine
- Occupation: Author
- Website: http://www.martindugard.com

Martin Dugard (born June 1, 1961, in Maine) is an American author living in Rancho Santa Margarita, California. He and his wife have three sons.

Alongside working a corporate marketing job, Dugard began writing professionally in 1988 for endurance sports magazines such as Competitor and Runner's World. In 1993, after covering the Raid Gauloises adventure race in Madagascar, Dugard left corporate marketing to pursue a full-time writing career. Dugard has done journalistic work, such as covering the Tour de France from 1999 to 2008, he primarily writes narrative non-fiction. Dugard wrote his first work of history in 2000.

== Works ==
Martin Dugard's works include:

- The Explorers
- Surviving the Toughest Race on Earth
- Into Africa: The dramatic retelling of the Stanley-Livingstone story,
- The Last Voyage of Columbus.
- The Training Ground: Grant, Lee, Sherman, and Davis in the Mexican War, 1846–1848
- To Be a Runner: How Racing Up Mountains, Running with the Bulls, or Just Taking on a 5-K Makes You a Better Person (and the World a Better place)

Co-written with Bill O'Reilly

- Killing Lincoln: The Shocking Assassination that Changed America Forever
- Killing Kennedy: The End of Camelot
- Killing Jesus: A History
- Killing Patton: The Strange Death of World War II's Most Audacious General
- Killing Reagan: A Violent Assault That Changed a Presidency
- Killing the Rising Sun: How America Vanquished World War II Japan
- Killing England: The Brutal Struggle for American Independence
- Killing the SS: The Hunt for the Worst War Criminals in History
- Killing Crazy Horse: The Merciless Indian Wars in America
- Killing the Mob: The Fight Against Organized Crime in America
- Killing the Killers: The Secret War Against Terrorists
- Killing the Legends: The Lethal Danger of Celebrity. St. Martin's Press.
- Confronting the Presidents: No Spin Assessments from Washington to Biden. St. Martin's Press.
- Killing the Witches: The Horror of Salem, Massachusetts

His 2008 screenplay, A Warrior's Heart, was released as a feature film starring Kellan Lutz and Ashley Greene. It was also presented at the Cannes Film Festival in 2011 and was released in the United States on 2 December 2011.

For a number of years, Dugard wrote a daily blog entitled The Paper Kenyan offering readers a daily riff on history, endurance sports, and travel. He still blogs from time to time, though on a much less frequent basis.
