= Political views of Bill O'Reilly =

American political commentator Bill O'Reilly regularly expresses his points of view on a wide variety of political, social, and moral issues. He has personally labeled his political philosophy traditionalism. The O'Reilly Factor, since its inception on the Fox News Channel in 1996, has been the primary outlet of his opinions. O'Reilly started his own radio program, The Radio Factor, a few years later. He has also written several non-fiction books detailing some of his beliefs. O'Reilly generally leans to the right on most issues, most notably the Bush administration's war on terror, but breaks from the conservative and Republican majority on such issues as the global warming controversy, gun control, gay marriage and the death penalty.

== Political views ==
=== Political affiliation ===
On The O'Reilly Factor and on his former talk-radio program, Bill O'Reilly has focused on news and commentary related to politics and culture. O'Reilly has long said that he does not identify with any political ideology, writing in his book The O'Reilly Factor that the reader "might be wondering if whether I'm conservative, liberal, libertarian, or exactly what.... See, I don't want to fit any of those labels, because I believe that the truth doesn't have labels. When I see corruption, I try to expose it. When I see exploitation, I try to fight it. That's my political position." On December 6, 2000, the Daily News in New York reported, however, that he had been registered with the Republican Party in the state of New York since 1994. When questioned about this, he said that he was not aware of it and says he registered as an independent after the interview. During a broadcast of The Radio Factor, O'Reilly said that there was no option to register as an independent voter; however, there was in fact a box marked "I do not wish to enroll in party." Despite being registered as an Independent, many view him as a conservative figure. A Pew Research February 2009 poll found that 66% of his television viewers identify themselves as conservative, 24% moderate, and 3% liberal. A November 2008 poll by Zogby International found that O'Reilly was the second most trusted news personality after Rush Limbaugh.

In a 2003 interview with Terry Gross on National Public Radio, O'Reilly said:

I'm not a political guy in the sense that I embrace an ideology. To this day I'm an independent thinker, an independent voter, I'm a registered independent... there are certain fundamental things that this country was founded upon that I respect and don't want changed. That separates me from the secularists who want a complete overhaul of how the country is run.

=== Domestic politics ===
O'Reilly has opined on many domestic issues. O'Reilly said the Bill Clinton impeachment stemming from the Lewinsky scandal was "not about sex. This is about honesty and cruelty. For Mr. Clinton, it was about undermining the justice system." In the same article he writes that Gary Condit, a moderate Democratic congressman from California who had an extramarital affair with Chandra Levy prior to her disappearance and death, should be held to the same standard.

O'Reilly has been critical of former Attorney General Janet Reno, calling her "perhaps the worst attorney general in history". He claims that the FBI became a "disorganized mess" during her tenure. He later praised former Attorney General John Ashcroft for going after the Arthur Andersen accounting firm, as well as Enron, WorldCom, Sam Waksal of Imclone and Martha Stewart.

In 2002, O'Reilly had criticized Democratic Senator Hillary Clinton, stating that she would run for president in 2008 (Which she did). In an interview with Jay Leno on The Tonight Show, he said, "I just feel that Hillary is a socialist, and I'm paying enough tax. Hillary wants to take my money [and] your money... and give it to strangers. There's something about that that offends me." He said that she had voted for every single spending bill that year. In the same interview, he accused her of running as a political carpetbagger, and said that she intends to abolish the Electoral College in favor of the popular vote, claiming that it would be done only to give her an advantage in the presidential race.

After criticizing the overturn of Snyder v. Phelps by the Fourth Circuit Court of Appeals, O'Reilly offered on March 30, 2010 to help Snyder pay the US$16,510 in court costs while he prepared an appeal to the Supreme Court.

==== 2004 presidential election ====
During the lead up to the 2004 presidential election, O'Reilly said that the Democratic Party has been taken over by the "far-left" in a conversation with former Democratic Congressman Brad Carson. Shortly following the election, O'Reilly ridiculed a message in which Democratic challenger John Kerry thanked his supporters for their support as well as opposing "the attacks from big news organizations such as Fox, Sinclair Broadcasting, and conservative talk radio." O'Reilly shot back, calling Kerry a "sissy" six times. Kerry himself stated publicly in a 2006 interview that he always felt he'd have a "fair shot" at conveying his views on The O'Reilly Factor and regrets not doing an interview prior to the election.

Although O'Reilly has never officially endorsed any candidate, he did advise his audience not to support Democratic South Dakota senator Tom Daschle in his Senate re-election bid on his radio program, saying that, "[W]ith all due respect to the senator, we don't have any respect for him at all. And we hope he loses in South Dakota. And I -- really, I stay out of all these races, but you guys listening in South Dakota, vote for the other guy." Daschle would lose the 2004 Senate election in South Dakota to John Thune.

==== 2008 presidential election ====
In the 2008 Democratic primary, O'Reilly urged his viewers not to vote for a candidate, this time John Edwards, and called Edwards a "phony" regarding his public statements on poverty. O'Reilly has, on many occasions, admitted to "having no respect for him", and called him "arrogant" for keeping his campaign staffer Amanda Marcotte on after making remarks O'Reilly called offensive to Christians.

O'Reilly has also criticized Republicans. When speaking to Ed Schulz in 2007, O'Reilly said that then-presidential candidate Rudy Giuliani had "terrible character judgement" with Bernard Kerik and felt that "disqualified him from being president."

==== "Culture War" and domestic politics ====
O'Reilly has taken to using the abbreviation "S-P", for "Secular Progressive", as a shorthand way of referring to a political category of people who want "drastic change" in the country. O'Reilly classifies the group as "far left", and almost always refers to the group in a negative manner. However, he says that he is not equating the negative qualities he sees in "SPs" with a "liberal" political ideology, saying the SP camp is far more "libertine" with social values:

Liberal thought, however, can be a good thing. Progressive programs to help the poor, fight injustice and give working people a fair shake are all positive. But libertine actions damage a just society because actions have consequences. Kids who drink and take drugs are likely to hurt themselves and others. But obviously, the SPs do not make judgments like that.

In his book Culture Warrior, O'Reilly called President John F. Kennedy and Dr. Martin Luther King Jr. examples of liberals who were also traditionalists, also citing current US Senators Joe Lieberman of Connecticut and Evan Bayh of Indiana as liberal/Democratic "traditionalists".

=== Foreign politics ===
==== Immigration and border control ====
O'Reilly has supported stricter border controls, including placement of the National Guard troops on the US-Mexican border and has criticized President George W. Bush for not allocating enough resources to make border security effective. He also criticized Ronald Reagan's act of amnesty, claiming that it made the illegal immigration problem worse. O'Reilly makes a distinction between criminal illegal immigrants and non-criminals by saying that criminal illegal immigrants should be deported immediately. O'Reilly criticizes the lack of cooperation between local sanctuary cities and the INS.

==== The Iraq War ====
O'Reilly initially supported the invasion of Iraq. Speaking on ABC's Good Morning America on March 18, 2003, O'Reilly promised that "If the Americans go in and overthrow Saddam Hussein and it's clean [of weapons of mass destruction]...I will apologize to the nation, and I will not trust the Bush administration again." In another appearance on the same program on February 10, 2004, O'Reilly responded to repeated requests for him to honor his pledge: "My analysis was wrong and I'm sorry. I was wrong. I'm not pleased about it at all." With regard to never again trusting the current U.S. government, he said, "I am much more skeptical of the Bush administration now than I was at that time."

O'Reilly has questioned the U.S. invasion of Iraq in hindsight, in particular the performance of Defense Secretary Donald Rumsfeld. However, he maintains that the United States "did a good thing by trying to liberate a country". O'Reilly says the war effort should continue as long as progress is being made. He has also said that some anti-war activists are actively rooting for the United States to lose:

General McCaffrey says strong progress is being made. He believes the Sunnis have turned against Al Qaeda and that the Maliki government is neutralizing the Shi'ia death squads.

Again, I don't know. With all America has sacrificed in Iraq, though, it seems reasonable to let the end game play out. If things are getting better, don't derail the train.

But the anti-war crew is now fully invested in defeat. So the struggle at home is becoming even more vicious. Iraq is a shooting war. America's a political war. Both are driven by hatred.

O'Reilly called the Iraqi people a "prehistoric group", citing a poll showing that only two percent of them viewed the U.S. Forces as liberators and 55 percent preferred that they leave. "We cannot intervene in the Muslim world ever again", he said. "What we can do is bomb the living daylights out of them (...) no more ground troops, no more hearts and minds, ain't going to work."

In an interview with White House Press Secretary (and former Fox News colleague) Tony Snow, O'Reilly said that the United States cannot win given the circumstances of Iraqis not supporting the effort:

You can't win. No one could. No nation could unless the Iraqi people turn on all the terrorists. And they're not. They're not, Tony.

O'Reilly went on to say that the country was corrupt and compared the situation to the American support of South Vietnam during the Vietnam War:

It's like South Vietnam. It's the same thing. There were a lot of South Vietnamese helping us. A lot fought and died on our side but there wasn't enough of them to prevent the communists which were more united.

O'Reilly would go on to praise General David Petraeus for reducing American casualties and advancing American objectives with the 2007 troop surge:

The cost has been great. We all know that. In suffering and cash. And the Iraqi government is still a mess. But General Petraeus, backed by a brave and professional U.S. military, has restored much order, largely defeated the Iraqi Al Qaeda thugs, and at least given the good people of that country a chance to prosper. General David Petraeus is "The Factor" person of the year by a wide margin.

During The Rumble with Jon Stewart, O'Reilly admitted that "We should not have gone to Iraq. Afghanistan we had to."

=== Iran ===
In April 2026, O'Reilly opined that Trump needed to win the Iran war to change the public's perception of him: "See, if he wins in Iran, the equation changes because he becomes the victor, and to the victor go the spoils, as the cliche goes."

==== Terrorism ====
O'Reilly has endorsed an aggressive war on terror policy. He supports coercive measures to extract information from detainees at Guantanamo Bay, which he visited on two occasions. He has said that, in comparison to procedures used under the regimes of dictators such as Adolf Hitler and Pol Pot, the U.S.'s tactics are not torture and are beneficial even when involving physical techniques, claiming that "Torture is taking my fingers off, disfiguring me, taking my eye out — not keeping me in a cold room and uncomfortable with blaring rock music." O'Reilly cites waterboarding as a successful coercive measure that should not be classified as torture, citing that Abu Zubaydah and Khaled Sheikh Mohammed have both given up valuable information after being subjected to the technique:

In my opinion, it is immoral to allow terrorists to kill people when you can stop them. If you capture someone who knows the inner workings of a terror outfit, you make life very uncomfortable for that person within boundaries set by Congress.

But let's stop the nonsense here. America's not a bad country because it waterboarded Zubaydah. The Bush administration has done its job. We haven't been attacked since 9/11.

The liberal press, politicians, the ACLU can't stop any wrongdoing. They're all lost in a fog of misguided indignation, crazy with hatred for Bush, but we the people must take a stand here. This isn't a game. This is life and death. And if you don't believe it, I know scores of people right here in New York City that will tell you about their dead loved ones.

Waterboarding should be a last resort, but it must be an option.

He has also said that detainees should be judged under military tribunals, but not protected under the Geneva Convention because the convention requires combatants to wear a uniform.

He has been critical of politicians such as Democratic Speaker of the House Nancy Pelosi and private citizens such as financier George Soros for wanting to try terror suspects in civilian courts.

O'Reilly has said that both political parties in the United States are "playing games" with regards to the war on terrorism:

...both the right and the left are playing games to some extent. Certainly, Al Qaeda remains dangerous, but the only way to hit them is to invade Pakistan. Do the Democrats want to do that?

On the other hand, it would be a tragedy if after all the blood and treasure Americans have sacrificed, Al Qaeda has not been badly damaged.

America should be united in fighting these savages, but we're not. Ideology has poisoned a reasoned, disciplined approach to defeating the jihadists. America's great strength, diversity of thought, can also be a weakness. And Al Qaeda knows it.

The old saying goes, "United we stand, divided we fall." Well, we're divided.

=== George Soros ===
O'Reilly has accused billionaire businessman, investor and political activist George Soros of trying to influence the 2008 election by donating to causes and organizations that O'Reilly calls the "radical left", such as moveon.org, which regularly criticizes conservative politicians. O'Reilly said of Soros "If Mike Myers didn't invent Dr. Evil, some would give Soros that moniker." O'Reilly also accused Media Matters for America of receiving funds from Soros; although Media Matters denies having any funding directly or indirectly from Soros, he and the group's founder, David Brock, have raised money together to fund political advertisements challenging John McCain in the 2008 election for what politico.com called "attack ads". O'Reilly responded to the politico report by labeling Soros, Brock and Paul Begala an "American axis of evil" and saying

This, ladies and gentlemen, is ultra dangerous. Most Americans have no idea who Soros or Brock are. They will only know what they see on TV, smear stuff against McCain. And the pipeline extends directly to NBC News, which will publicize every piece of slime Brock can create. Only one word describes this: despicable.

O'Reilly alleged that PBS personality Bill Moyers oversaw $500,000 worth of money transferred from the Shoeman Center Foundation (a group Soros donated to) to Media Matters.

you know, you've got to admire Soros for coming up with this organization. I mean, you know, he's made billions by doing this in business, by being in Curaçao and Bermuda and France, where he was convicted of a felony. And he knows how to do this. He knows how to move the money around and use it to gain influence. And now he's set his sights on changing the basic fabric of this country.

The organization to which O'Reilly refers is the Open Society Institute.

=== ACLU ===
O'Reilly has been critical of the American Civil Liberties Union (ACLU), calling it "the most dangerous organization in the United States of America" especially in their challenging of the Justice Department and the Department of Defense regarding the war on terror. He has called them a "fascist" organization in response to their threatened lawsuit against Los Angeles County for failing to remove a cross from its official seal.

O'Reilly alleged hypocrisy on the part of the ACLU for stating that New York City's random searches of bags in the public transportation as a breach of personal rights, but requiring people entering their New York headquarters to consent to a bag search.

O'Reilly asserted that the ACLU is now a political organization rather than an advocacy group, taking positions and cases based on politics rather than free speech.

He has come down hard on the organization for its actions on behalf of the North American Man Boy Love Association (NAMBLA) which is currently under suspicion of involvement with the rape and murder of a young boy:

Now many of these people subscribe to a philosophy of relativism. That is a theory which says there's no absolute right or wrong. All moral values are relative. What's wrong for you is not wrong for your neighbor if he or she doesn't think his or her actions are wrong. That's what the North American Man-Boy Love Association (NAMBLA) is all about. Those loons believe it's OK to rape kids because they want to.

The ACLU defends NAMBLA's freedom of speech surrounding their publications and has said that the legal blame in the murder should go to who committed it.

The ACLU has said that they sometimes have to defend "unpopular" speech or speech that they don't agree with, including the Ku Klux Klan's, saying their only "client" is the Bill of Rights. O'Reilly alleges the ACLU "cherry picks" its cases to promote a left wing agenda while not supporting causes of free speech that conservatives support in his criticism of the ACLU defending live sex shows in Oregon.

O'Reilly decried the group's criticism of The Minutemen, claiming the latter were only engaging in a form of protest, a right the ACLU defends. O'Reilly alleges that the organization is protesting the Minutemen because they are going against the ACLU's agenda.

O'Reilly accused the organization of having an anti-Christian bias when it protested the portrayal of the nativity scene in New York City Public Schools, but did not protest displayal of the Jewish menorah or the Islamic star and crescent.

O'Reilly criticized the ACLU for suing San Diego County for renting property to the Boy Scouts of America in Balboa Park. The ACLU brought up a law claiming that the Boy Scouts discriminated against gays and atheists. O'Reilly criticized the San Diego City Council for voting 6-2 to vote the Scouts out before a ruling on the lawsuit was made.

It would be impossible for the Boy Scouts (search) or any children's organization to admit avowed homosexuals because of the potential liability. Say the Scouts put openly gay and straight kids together and some sexual activity occurred. Well, parents could sue for millions, same way parents could sue if the Scouts put boys and girls together and underaged sex occurred. As far as the atheist issue is concerned, the Scouts say no specific belief in God is necessary, only an acknowledgement of a higher power. And that power could be nature. Come on. The whole discrimination thing is bogus.

Part of the Boy Scout Oath begins, "On my honor, I will do my best to do my duty to God and my country" and the final point of the Scout Law reads, "A Scout is reverent," with the Boy Scouts' of America official explanation being that "a Scout is reverent toward God. He is faithful in his religious duties. He respects the beliefs of others." However, the bylaws of the organization specifically state that Scouts must "respect the religious beliefs of others" and "in no case where a unit is connected with a church or other distinctively religious organization shall members of other denominations or faith be required, because of their membership in the unit, to take part in or observe a religious ceremony distinctly unique to that organization or church."

O'Reilly argues this is a liberal definition of what God may be, allowing diversity for anyone believing in a higher power to join.

He went on to compare the ACLU to Nazis:

Now the ACLU is free to come to your town and sue the heck out of it. And believe me, that organization will. The ACLU doesn't care about the law or the Constitution or what the people want. It's a fascist organization that uses lawyers instead of Panzers. It'll find a way to inflict financial damage on any concern that opposes its secular agenda and its growing in power.

He later went on to criticize the Boy Scout leadership for not standing up to the ACLU.

On October 16, 2006 at Mount Pleasant High School in Michigan, a student stood up publicly in the cafeteria and called the principal of the school "a skank and a tramp." In addition to this, the student called the school administrators Nazis and questioned the sexuality of the vice-principal. The school suspended the boy for 10 days, an action that brought a lawsuit by the ACLU. O'Reilly criticized the ACLU for defending the remarks as satire when he saw it as hate speech.

== Social views ==
=== Abortion ===
O'Reilly supported California Proposition 73 because it would have required parental notification of underage girls seeking an abortion. "[T]he left-wing media has been able to convince millions of Americans that the government knows what's best for families, not the parents."

O'Reilly strongly condemns doctors who provide legal abortion services. Since 2005, he has repeatedly referred to physician and abortion doctor George Tiller as "Tiller the baby killer" on his Fox News prime time show, claiming that there must be "a special place in hell" for him. In May 2009, Tiller was murdered by anti-abortion radical Christian terrorist Scott Roeder.

O'Reilly ardently condemns the practice of partial birth abortion. He has criticized the practice being done without explanations being made and has criticized human rights groups such as Amnesty International and Human Rights Watch for not condemning the practice:

Once again, this isn't about a women's [sic] right to choose or the New York Times plea for reproductive rights. This is about late term abortions for just about any reason.

=== Education ===
O'Reilly supports the discussion (but not the advocation) of intelligent design in schools and considers the opinion of the National Academy of Sciences and the American Association for the Advancement of Science's opposition to such theories "fascist". O'Reilly has also suggested that Richard Dawkins' argument for how science should be taught in school is equivalent to fascism. He said he supports teachers saying that some people, especially in religious groups, believe that Charles Darwin's theory of evolution is wrong.

O'Reilly has said that there is a lack of leadership among the traditionalists and this has emboldened the secular-progressive cause. He consistently says that using religion to justify public policy is wrong:

Right now, religious people are the ones speaking out for traditional values. But America does not forge public policy based on religion. Thus as soon as God enters the debate, the secularists win.

=== Gun rights ===
O'Reilly supports the Second Amendment. O'Reilly supports some forms of gun control, such as gun registration. However, he has cast doubt on the effectiveness of gun control.

=== Health care ===
O'Reilly opposed the nationalized health care plan that filmmaker Michael Moore argues for in his film Sicko, saying it would create huge backlogs. He also said, however, that he thinks the government should perform more oversight functions on health care:

...[G]overnment-run health care would be a disaster, featuring long waits for treatment and an enormous rise in taxation. But there should be government oversight on private insurance companies and strict guidelines about abusing customers. There can be compromise and effective government control of medical care abuse in the USA. It is possible. But if Michael Moore's plan ever gets traction, pray hard you never get sick.

=== LGBT issues ===
O'Reilly's stance on LGBT issues has been evolving.

On October 27, 2004, he was quoted saying: “I've been saying that all along, that if you open the door for gay marriage, then you have to have the polygamists and the triads and the commune people and everybody else, right?”

O'Reilly supports civil unions for gay and lesbian couples, but has said that nobody has the "right" to marry; he says that marriage, like driving a car, is a privilege, not a right. He has said that if the government felt marriage was a right, then it would not stop polygamists and incestuous couples from marrying. O'Reilly further explained his position in his book Culture Warrior:

To this culture warrior, gay marriage is not a vital issue. I don't believe the republic will collapse if Larry marries Brendan. However, it is clear that most Americans want heterosexual marriage to maintain its special place in American society. And as long as gays are not penalized in the civil arena, I think the folks should make the call at the ballot box. Traditional marriage is widely seen as a social stabilizer, and I believe that is true.

On March 26, 2013, O'Reilly stated "I support civil unions, I always have. The gay marriage thing, I don't feel that strongly about it one way or the other. I think the states should do it." O'Reilly then said, "The compelling argument is on the side of homosexuals ... 'We're Americans, we just want to be treated like everybody else.' That's a compelling argument, and to deny that you've got to have a very strong argument on the other side. And the other side hasn't been able to do anything but thump the Bible.

O'Reilly discussed a story surrounding around a teenage lesbian couple being elected as the "cutest couple" in their school yearbook. He stated that he believed that this couple was elected by the students to "tweak the adults" and to "cause trouble". He explains further here:

High school kids, they experiment. They experiment all over the place, they have a chip on their shoulder. They do things just to get a reaction, just to rebel. Parents might say "We don't want to normalize homosexuality in a public way in an academic setting among minors. We don't think that reflects how we feel about it".

O'Reilly is known to favor adoption by a same-sex couple since 2002.

O'Reilly is opposed to the School Success and Opportunity Act (Assembly Bill 1266), which extends gender identity and expression discrimination protection to transgender and gender-nonconforming K-12 students in public schools. O'Reilly described the law as "madness" and "anarchy" on Fox News Channel.

Just before the repeal of the "Don't Ask, Don't Tell" law banning homosexuals from openly serving in the military, he appeared on the Tonight Show and called the law "nonsense" and said he didn't understand why the President, in his role as commander in chief of the armed forces, simply didn't sign an executive order rescinding it.

=== US legal system ===
He regularly criticizes jurists in controversial cases as "activist judges." He uses the issue of gay marriage as an example. "The folks decide that by voting and, in the case of gay marriage, the folks have decided. And that decision should be respected."

==== Jessica's Law ====
O'Reilly is a self-professed proponent of stricter penalties for child molesters. He has fervently supported Jessica's Law, and criticized the law's detractors. He has given verbal support for Republican Doug Forrester in the 2005 New Jersey gubernatorial election, suggesting that his opponent, Democrat Jon Corzine, would be less likely to support a national version of the law, though stopped short of actually endorsing Forrester.

O'Reilly has been particularly critical of the Debra LaFave case, in which she was convicted of having sex with a 14-year-old boy, but was only sentenced to house arrest and seven years probation.

He criticizes many politicians who oppose mandatory minimum sentences for child molesters, and calls several states "child predator-friendly."

== Entertainment media ==
=== Film industry ===
O'Reilly has been very critical of the U.S. film industry for producing films featuring violence and human suffering, such as the Saw series. He has compared this to the brutal displays of death in the Colosseums of ancient Rome. O'Reilly has said that films like these are marketed to children and can have consequences on their personal development. He commented on Kill Bill: Volume 1:

It's the most violent movie ever made, featuring brutal dismemberments and a scalping close-up. And you should see the raves this movie is getting from the pinhead critics. And who's lining up to see it? Children, that's who.

O'Reilly severely chastized billionaire businessman and investor Mark Cuban, owner of the Dallas Mavericks, for his support of Brian De Palma's film Redacted that portrayed the rape of an Iraqi girl by American soldiers. O'Reilly claimed that the film would be used as a recruiting tool by terrorists.

=== Music industry ===
O'Reilly has criticized the rap and hip hop industry for promoting an "anti-social" culture. He has said he does not care if adults listen to the music, but argues that children are not able to process the information and determine it to be destructive behavior. He has gone after several rappers and singers such as 50 Cent, Beyoncé, Common, Eminem, Jay-Z, Jadakiss, Kanye West, Lil Wayne, Ludacris, Lupe Fiasco, Nas, Nelly, Snoop Dogg, and Young Jeezy:

Every educator that I've talked to, and I've talked to hundreds, say that the kind of gangsta rap that Ludacris traffics in has debased the culture, made it more difficult for them to teach children and indeed, led children into anti-social behavior.

In 2007, O'Reilly became embroiled in a conflict with Nas following the rapper's engagement to perform at Virginia Tech, a year subsequent to the tragic events of the Virginia Tech massacre. "Having a rapper who trades in violence perform at Virginia Tech insults the victims, the university and the entire commonwealth," declared Bill O'Reilly. Nas subsequently called Bill O'Reilly a racist, and accused O'Reilly of going to extremes for publicity. He repeated this stance again in July 2008, when a dispute between Nas and O'Reilly led to Nas taking a petition to Fox News, and appearing on both Fox News, and The Colbert Report. Also in 2008, Nas challenged Bill O'Reilly to a public debate, to which O'Reilly did not accept.

In May 2015, O'Reilly blamed the decline of American religion particularly the declining numbers of American Christians on hip hop music by citing the genre as "pernicious entertainment" and an adducing factor for contributing to the decline. O'Reilly remarked that people of faith are being marginalized by a secular media and pernicious entertainment and rap industry, which often glorifies depraved behavior causing the minds of people who consume the music as the least likely to reject religion." American rapper Killer Mike subsequently criticized him for his remarks calling O'Reilly "full of more shit than an outhouse" and then mocked him while he was a guest Real Time with Bill Maher.

Several rappers and hip hop producers have appeared on The O'Reilly Factor. Rapper Cam'ron and hip hop entrepreneur Damon Dash appeared on the program to defend their supposed corruption of young people, to which Damon Dash responded:

So, if you know there is negative in something, try to find the positive as opposed to always talking about the negative. That's the thing I don't understand, why we're criticized so hard within hip-hop. No one talks about the jobs we create, no one talks about the things we do within our community, and no one talks about the businesses we've done, how we've opened the doors and shown people that it's cool to be smart, it's cool to be a CEO, and it's cool to not take advantage but to reap the benefits of all your labor and to do it fairly.

O'Reilly has also interviewed rock musician Marilyn Manson on the topic of being a "dangerous influence" on American youth. O'Reilly inquired of Manson if he thought his artistic endeavors encouraged kids to have sex, homosexual relationships, substance abuse, and the use of profanity. He also asked Manson whether his songs encouraged suicide or not. Marilyn Manson answered that in his view the songs were about getting through those feelings, and that ultimately people make their own decisions.

== News media ==
O'Reilly believes the American news media is corrupt and often criticizes it for not reporting topics that hurt the liberal agenda. He has often stated that he is the only one in the media holding people accountable on both sides. In June 2007, Adweek Magazine sponsored a survey that asked participants who they trusted more as a source of political information between ABC News and O'Reilly. According to the poll, 36 percent believe that O'Reilly is a better source than ABC News, while 26 percent believe the opposite. According to the survey, 23 percent of Democrats believed that O'Reilly was a better source while 55 percent of Republicans believed the same.

O'Reilly has criticized the media for not highlighting Rosie O'Donnell's controversial remarks saying the United States attacked itself on September 11th while they highlighted Ann Coulter's remarks about calling Senator John Edwards a "fag." O'Reilly said in response to the situation:

Doing the math, Ms. O'Donnell says something 100 times more offensive than Ms. Coulter, in my opinion, yet there's no coverage about it. But there's no left wing media bias in this country. Oh no!

O'Reilly has criticized journalists who donate to political parties after a report stated that nine out of 10 journalists donated to Democrats or liberal causes; he has said this has resulted in news media tilting to the left.

O'Reilly says that news coverage about positive improvements for American and Iraqi objectives in Iraq have been largely ignored. He conjectured that the ignoring of the positive news took place to help a Democrat win a presidential election.

O'Reilly has asked his viewers and listeners to not patronize the following media outfits, saying those organizations "have regularly helped distribute defamatory, false or non-newsworthy information supplied by far-left websites":

- The St. Petersburg Times
- MSNBC
- The New Yorker Magazine
- Newsday
- U.S. News & World Report
- St. Louis Post Dispatch
- Atlanta Journal-Constitution
- Syracuse Post-Standard
- Kansas City Star
- Roanoke Times
- Barre Montpelier Times Argus
- Chicago Sun Times

=== Television news ===
In an interview with commentator Bill Maher, former CBS News anchor Dan Rather accused Fox News Channel of receiving "talking points" from the Republican controlled White House. O'Reilly criticized Rather heavily, responding that Rather did not offer any evidence to support the claim. O'Reilly cited his defense of Rather during the Memogate incident:

As you may remember, I defended Rather in the Bush National Guard debacle. I said Rather did not intentionally put on a bogus story. He just didn't check it out, he was too anxious for the story to be true.

Now many of you criticized me for that defense, but I'm a fact-based guy. And there's no evidence Dan Rather fabricated anything. It was sloppy reporting that did him in.

But now the fabrication word is in play again. If Dan Rather has evidence of White House dictums coming to FOX News employees, he needs to display that evidence. We are awaiting his appearance. We'll let you know when it is.

O'Reilly has gone after PBS personality Bill Moyers. O'Reilly criticized Moyers for having no balance in his presentations, citing a criticism by PBS' own ombudsman. He also called Moyers dishonest for making disparaging remarks about O'Reilly to Rolling Stone and then later denying he made the remarks when confronted by one of O'Reilly's producers.

CNN journalists were prominent among those critical of O'Reilly when he stated that he "couldn't get over the fact" that a largely African-American crowd at a Harlem restaurant behaved no differently than patrons of a white restaurant and garnered media coverage O'Reilly objected to CNN's portrayal of his commentary, stating that CNN had been irresponsible in mischaracterizing his remark as racist, when in fact, he said, he was actually speaking against racism.

O'Reilly scolded MSNBC and CNN for not providing coverage of the ceremony that awarded Lieutenant Michael P. Murphy the Medal of Honor during their primetime shows. O'Reilly said that "[O]n their prime-time broadcast last night, CNN and MSNBC just said no to Lieutenant Michael Murphy and his proud family," that the networks "despise the Bush administration and believe anything positive like American heroes in war zones, detract from their negative assessment of the administration" and that they should not claim to support the troops and ignore their heroism. MSNBC and CNN had covered the events during their daytime programs.

==== NBC News and MSNBC ====
O'Reilly has criticized NBC News and their affiliated cable service MSNBC several times for their coverage of the war in Iraq, claiming that it is biased toward the war's opponents. He later called NBC News the most "anti-military news operation in the country," when he cited an example of NBC correspondent William Arkin that called American troops "mercenaries."

He also criticized the network of trying to downplay the war on terror in the wake of American casualties in Iraq.

Robert Greenwald, who had directed the controversial documentary Outfoxed that criticized O'Reilly and the Fox News Channel, put together an event of homeless veterans criticizing O'Reilly for calling John Edwards dishonest when Edwards asserted that there were about 200,000 homeless veterans. O'Reilly denied Edwards claim, stating "They may be out there, but there are not many of them out there, OK. So if you know where there is a veteran sleeping under a bridge, you call me immediately, and we will make sure that man does not do it." After government statistics supported Edwards, O'Reilly then said that there was no linkage between the economy and homeless veterans and claims that Veterans Affairs has up to 150,000 beds ready for them every night. O'Reilly felt Greenwald's event was a "contrived" situation after O'Reilly's producers had interviewed some of the homeless veterans whom were protesting and found out that some did not actually hear O'Reilly's comments. O'Reilly blasted NBC's Steve Capus and the New York Daily News for covering the event and claimed that Capus did not know about the nature of the event.

O'Reilly called NBC hypocritical for putting supporters of legalizing prostitution in the wake of Democratic Governor of New York Eliot Spitzer resigning his post after allegedly engaging in the act in an effort and felt they would not be as defensive if a Republican had gotten in trouble.

Although he praised the late Meet the Press host Tim Russert in the past, O'Reilly criticized Russert for what he saw as a misinterpretation of what were seen as potentially racially insensitive comments by former President Bill Clinton. In his comments, Russert challenged Senator Hillary Clinton about her husband's remarks regarding Senator Barack Obama, when Mr. Clinton referred to Obama's position on Iraq as a "fairy tale." O'Reilly said that Russert "should have known better" and realized the former President's comments were regarding Obama's Iraq policy and not his entire candidacy.

===== Tape doctoring incidents =====
O'Reilly would join in the criticism of others when NBC News was found to have doctored tapes on multiple occasions. The first was about accused killer George Zimmerman that portrayed Zimmerman as having a racial motivation. He also criticized veteran news correspondent Andrea Mitchell for her reporting of a doctored tape of Mitt Romney to portray him as out of touch. After the Sandy Hook Shooting, O'Reilly and others criticized MSNBC's Martin Bashir of dishonesty when Bashir only played a part of the entire tape that portrayed the father of a victim being heckled when the entire tape showed the audience only saying something after he made it clear he was looking for an answer. O'Reilly criticized MSNBC host Rachel Maddow showed a tape of Senator John McCain portraying him as insensitive to the plight of a person who lost a family member to gun violence. Although Maddow did readily admit the tape may have been doctored, O'Reilly criticized her nonetheless for airing it knowing that it could have been edited.

=== Press ===
O'Reilly has accused the print press of purposely misquoting him and using their hard news pages to further their editorial points of view. He has said that print media is too liberal and attacks opposing viewpoints.

In 2003, O'Reilly criticized the Los Angeles Times for endorsing then-governor Gray Davis, who was running against Arnold Schwarzenegger and a whole field of different candidates, including Republicans, Democrats and Independents, in a recall election. He said that he "has never seen a newspaper try to destroy someone as aggressively as the Times is doing." He also criticized The New York Times on the same issue for referring to Schwarzenegger solely as a bodybuilder. He made the claim that Californians have canceled their subscriptions due to the "extreme left-wing bias" of the newspaper.

O'Reilly has accused the media of being hypercritical of President Bush's handling of North Korea and Iran pursuing nuclear weapons while not being critical of President Bill Clinton for what was the same course of action.

==== The New York Times ====
O'Reilly frequently criticizes The New York Times, accusing them of omitting information that would be damaging to left-wing organizations and causes.

On March 15, 2007, The New York Times ran an editorial titled "Immigration Misery" that had claimed a "screaming baby girl has been forcibly weaned from breast milk and taken dehydrated to an emergency room so that the nation's borders will be secure." Upon further investigation, the only two babies admitted to the hospital in the area of Bedford, Massachusetts (where the raid took place) were due to dehydration because of pneumonia and not as a result of being "forcibly weaned." O'Reilly alleged that the information in the editorial was falsified and claimed The Times wanted to promote illegal immigration in order to make the illegal immigrants into legal US citizens and register them as Democrats.

He accused The Times of promoting NBC News over ABC News.

On June 2, 2007, Homeland Security stopped a plot by four terror suspects thought to be linked to Al Qaeda. Authorities have alleged that the suspects were trying to blow up an oil pipeline in the Howard Beach section of New York City that carries jet fuel to JFK Airport. O'Reilly went on his program and told his listeners that he expected The Times to report it as a featured story on its Sunday edition for June 3, but found that the story was on page 37. O'Reilly accused the newspaper of burying the story not to highlight a successful foiled terror plot because it contradicts the paper's editorial point of view. O'Reilly claims that as polls show most Americans feel Republicans would do a better job of handling a terrorist threat than Democrats, The Times intentionally gave the news less exposure in hopes of influencing their readers' focus away from issues that Democrats tend to poll weaker than Republicans in. O'Reilly has also said that the paper would highlight any terrorist attack if one was to occur so they may criticize the Bush Administration:

So The Times wins both ways. The paper diminishes the War on Terror by putting it on page 37, but if something bad ever happened, it can attack President Bush.

O'Reilly has accused the paper of being deceptive about television ratings for The O'Reilly Factor against that of MSNBC during the same time slot, citing that the paper felt that MSNBC was "competitive" with his program when O'Reilly's ratings were significantly higher.

O'Reilly has questioned the paper's interpretation of violence statistics among veterans of the military. His contention is that the paper is out to disparage the military as being overly violent after returning home from deployment in the war on terror.

O'Reilly criticized the paper for running an article alleging Senator John McCain had an "inappropriate relationship" during the lobbyist controversy story the paper had. O'Reilly raised the question about why the paper had endorsed McCain on January 25, 2008 for the Republican nomination if they had information that alleged an inappropriate relationship.

In May 2009, O'Reilly severely criticized the paper as "corrupt" for dropping a story about a possible violation of campaign laws by ACORN and the Obama campaign. O'Reilly claimed that sworn testimony before Congress by a former ACORN employee, Anita Moncrief corroborated the story. O'Reilly stated:

Strong evidence suggests the paper killed a story linking ACORN to some Obama people. Instead they ran a general piece stating ACORN has a left-wing bias, knowing that story would be largely ignored while the Obama connection would not be.

In response, the New York Times ombudsman, Clark Hoyt stated it "was a normal and reasonable editorial decision" not to run the article. He said the Times had run four other stories on ACORN. The story in question had remained unpublished because Anita Moncrief had not provided independently verifiable proof. In addition, The Times ombudsman stated that Moncrief had not given sworn testimony to Congress as claimed by O'Reilly, and that she had credibility problems, having been fired from Acorn for employee theft.

==== Internet media ====
O'Reilly has accused a few liberal political websites of "distorting the truth" and "engaging in hatred":

There are no rules. These people will do and say pretty much anything to harm people with whom they disagree politically. The trend started back in the Clinton-Lewinsky days, and now thousands of bloggers are operating, throwing dirt all over the place. Now they're not all bad. Some of these bloggers are good, accurate watchdogs. But there are plenty of awful ones.

He has criticized the Daily Kos website, accusing it of calling for increased attacks upon American troops in Iraq, and for Iran to attack Israel. O'Reilly has also alleged that Daily Kos bloggers have called the Pope a primate and evangelicals "nut cases", that they wish for the success of any subsequent attempts at the assassination of Vice President Dick Cheney after he avoided an attempt on his life in Afghanistan during a 2007 visit, and have said that the world is "better off" without White House Press Secretary Tony Snow when Snow publicly said he had cancer.

In summer of 2007, O'Reilly said that the entire field of 2008 Democratic presidential candidates (aside from Senator Joseph Biden) went to the Yearly Kos convention that was sponsored by the Daily Kos. He has said that sites like the Kos are taking control of the Democratic Party through intimidation:

As we have been reporting, a group of far-left bloggers has succeeded in frightening most of the Democratic presidential candidates and moving the party significantly to the left, at least in the primary season. The lead intimidators are MoveOn, Media Matters and the vicious Daily Kos. These people savagely attack those with whom they disagree. And the politicians don't want to become smear targets. So most of the Democratic candidates have agreed to speak at the Kos convention this coming weekend, something that is beyond shameful.

O'Reilly has compared the Huffington Post to the Nazis and the KKK. He also called MoveOn.org the "new Klan." In response, Arianna Huffington wrote that O'Reilly had confused bloggers with anonymous commenters and suggested he enroll in "How to Use the Internet 101." Huffington alleged that offensive comments are taken down from her site when confronted by one of O'Reilly's producers. She also noted that offensive comments are posted by users of O'Reilly's own site, billoreilly.com. O'Reilly alleged that Huffington had no standards of conduct and did not remove comments about wishing Nancy Reagan had died after she fell that were written on her site. "She says it is down, but it is not. She does not tell the truth." O'Reilly later alleged that Huffington implied Pope Benedict XVI was a Nazi. O'Reilly referred to a satirical article written by comedian Chris Kelly, which mocked O'Reilly on Huffington's website.

== Environmental issues ==
O'Reilly generally supports the notion of a clean environment, although he has said that he is not entirely certain that fossil fuels are the cause of global warming. Nonetheless, he has expressed support for a long-term strategy to curb fossil fuel use. He has said he would not support the Kyoto Treaty for economic reasons, but supports the use of fewer polluting agents, more conservation, and "tons more innovation" such as tax credits for alternative fuels. He has said that renewable energy is a waste of time because "God controls the climate" and that "nobody can control the climate except God, so give a little extra at mass".

== Economic views ==
O'Reilly is a frequent critic of government welfare and poverty programs. He is also critical of the estate tax. However, he does not differentiate between the marginal tax rate (46 percent) and the effective tax rate (roughly 9 percent).

O'Reilly has said French unemployment and subsequent riots are the "common effects of socialist thinking". He claims the French unemployment rate is high because of entitlements sanctioned by the French government, and that these entitlements make employers hesitant to hire young employees for fear that they will be required to give benefits to underperforming workers.

He says he supports income-based affirmative action as opposed to race-related affirmative action.

=== Trade with hostile countries ===
O'Reilly has been critical of companies doing business with countries that are hostile to the United States. O'Reilly criticized General Electric for doing business with Iran. O'Reilly cited how NBC News' correspondent John Hockenberry did a report on Dateline highlighting GE's business relationship with the Bin Laden family and was criticized by the company, who owns NBC, for the Dateline report.

=== Free markets, profits, and the oil companies ===
O'Reilly questions the free market by suggesting that the oil companies need an excuse to raise prices thereby overlooking the fact that in a free market, oil companies have the right to increase prices so as to increase profits or for any other reason. Rather than praise oil companies for their record profits, O'Reilly has been critical of oil companies, claiming their record profits are evidence that they have price-gouged Americans with artificially high gas prices. and has said he is personally boycotting products by Exxon-Mobil. It therefore appears that O'Reilly does not recognize profit maximization as a virtue. He has often taken an opposing point of view to conservatives such as fellow Fox News analyst and commentator, Neil Cavuto. During one discussion on The O'Reilly Factor, Cavuto accused O'Reilly of "push[ing] populist nonsense." He said blocking Brazilian ethanol imports was "awful" and has criticized both the Bush Administration and the Clinton Administration for not doing enough to stem the cost of oil from "foreign predators".

=== Protectionism ===
In a May 8, 2006 article published at the Jewish World Review, O'Reilly said, "There is no question that illegal workers deliver more profit to business than American workers do. A Harvard study says that the employment of illegal foreign workers has driven down wages among American high school dropouts, the lowest labor pool rung, by 7 percent."

=== Idyllic civilization ===
Bill O'Reilly on his show The O'Reilly Factor has expressed the view that "if everybody followed the teachings of Jesus Christ, [...] we'd have peace on earth, [...] everybody would love one another, and we'd almost be an idyllic civilization."

=== Ethanol ===
O'Reilly claims that the United States is not doing enough to make itself independent of foreign oil, stating that "There's no way the ethanol industry could be dominated by five mega-companies. I mean corn and sugar cannot be carteled. The oil racket is simple: We control the marketplace, and you have to buy from us. ... If Brazil can develop an ethanol industry that makes it completely independent of foreign oil, then the USA can."
