= Legends & Lies =

- Genre: Documentary/Historical drama
- Directed by: Kevin Hershberger
- Presented by: Bill O'Reilly (Seasons 1-2), Brian Kilmeade (Season 3)
- Narrated by: Dermot Mulroney
- Country of origin: United States
- Original language: English
- No. of seasons: 3
- No. of episodes: 34

Production
- Executive producer: Bill O'Reilly
- Running time: 60 minutes

Original release
- Network: Fox News
- Release: April 12, 2015 – present

Legends & Lies is an American television series shown on Fox News Channel. Its executive producer is Bill O'Reilly.

The show's premise is to present the history of notable people in documentary style, debunking inaccurate details that have entered pop culture mythology. The series features dramatizations of parts of the subjects' lives and exploits, as well as explanatory segments by historians and experts, and often O'Reilly himself.

The show premiered in April 2015. Its normal broadcast schedule is on Saturday and Sunday nights. Each season of the series also features an accompanying book co-authored by David Fisher and O'Reilly. Season 3 had its finale on June 10, 2018.

== Episodes ==
=== Season 1 (2015) ===
The first season focused on the figures from the American Old West.

The Real West
No. overall	No. in season	Title	Directed by	Written by	Original release date	Prod. code	US viewers (millions)
1	1	"Jesse James: Bloody Politics"	Kevin Hershberger	Ajax Broome, Jason Broome, Kevin Huffman, Wendy Nardi, Keith Palmer	April 12, 2015	TBA	1.032
A profile of Jesse James.
2	2	"Doc Holliday: Desperate Measures"	Kevin Hershberger	Philip Boag, Sonya Gay Bourn, Jason Broome, Keith Palmer, David Schaye, Jamie Smith	April 12, 2015	TBA	1.011
A profile of John Henry "Doc" Holliday includes the gunfight at the O.K. Corral.
3	3	"James "Wild Bill" Hickok: Plains Justice"	Kevin Hershberger	Philip Boag, Jason Broome, Dan Gloeckner, Keith Palmer, David Schaye, Tyler Young	April 19, 2015	TBA	1.517
A profile of James Butler "Wild Bill" Hickok features his reputation as a marksman and penchant for gambling.
4	4	"Kit Carson: Duty Before Honor"	Kevin Hershberger	Ajax Broome, Jason Broome, Claire Callahan, Kevin Huffman, Wendy Nardi, Keith Palmer	April 26, 2015	TBA	N/A
A profile of Christopher Houston "Kit" Carson (1809-68) explores his reputation as a mountain man, wilderness guide, and Army officer.
5	5	"Davy Crockett: Capitol Hillbilly"	Kevin Hershberger	Ajax Broome, Jason Broome, Michael Byrne, Michael Eldridge	May 3, 2015	TBA	N/A
A profile of Davy Crockett (1786-1836), a frontiersman, politician, and folk hero, who died at the Battle of the Alamo.
6	6	"Black Bart: Gentleman Bandit"	Kevin Hershberger	Ajax Broome, Jason Broome, Michael Byrne, Michael Eldridge	May 10, 2015	TBA	N/A
A profile of Black Bart, a notorious stagecoach robber in the Old West.
7	7	"Billy the Kid: Escape Artist"	Kevin Hershberger	Jason Broome, Claire Callahan, Keith Palmer, Eric Weinthal	May 17, 2015	TBA	N/A
A profile of Billy the Kid, a New York City native who became an outlaw in the Old West in the 1870s.
8	8	"George Custer: A General's Reckoning"	Kevin Hershberger	Jason Broome, Claire Callahan, David Huntley, Keith Palmer, David Schaye	May 31, 2015	TBA	N/A
A profile of George Armstrong Custer, a Civil War commander in the Union Army, who later died at the Battle of Little Big Horn in 1876.
9	9	"Bass Reeves: The Real Lone Ranger"	Kevin Hershberger	Jason Broome, Gardner Linn	June 7, 2015	TBA	1.37
A profile of Bass Reeves (1838-1910), a former slave who became a deputy U.S. marshal and is thought to be the inspiration for the Lone Ranger.
10	10	"Butch Cassidy: The Last Man Standing"	Kevin Hershberger	Sonya Gay Bourn, Jason Broome, Keith Palmer, David Schaye	June 14, 2015	TBA	1.24
A profile of Robert Leroy Parker and Harry Alonzo Longabaugh, a pair of notorious Old West outlaws, who were immortalized in the Oscar-nominated film, Butch Cassidy and the Sundance Kid.

=== Season 2 (2016) ===
The second season is about the heroes and patriots who helped shape America into a nation.

The Patriots
No. overall	No. in season	Title	Directed by	Written by	Original release date	Prod. code	US viewers (millions)
11	1	"Sam Adams & Paul Revere: The Rebellion Begins"	Kevin Hershberger	Unknown	June 5, 2016	TBA	N/A
The story behind the Sam Adams and Paul Revere and the rest of the Sons of Liberty and the fight for American Independence.
12	2	"John Adams: Ready for War"	Kevin Hershberger	Ajax Broome, Jason Broome, Sam Dolan, Keith Palmer, Frederick Rendina	June 19, 2016	TBA	N/A
Lawyer John Adams represents the British soldiers involved in the Boston Massacre in 1770; colonists protest the Tea Act 1773; the American Revolution begins in April, 1775 at the Battles of Lexington and Concord.
13	3	"Benjamin Franklin: Inventing America"	Kevin Hershberger	Ajax Broome, Jason Broome, Claire Callahan, Gardner Linn, Keith Palmer	June 26, 2016	TBA	N/A
A profile of Benjamin Franklin includes his frequent trips to Europe; influence in the Second Continental Congress; and role in the American Revolution.
14	4	"General George Washington: Commanding Revolution"	Kevin Hershberger	Jason Broome, Sam Dolan, Kevin Huffman, Wendy Nardi, Keith Palmer	July 3, 2016	TBA	N/A
George Washington's exploits as commander of the Continental Army, including his first victory in Boston and subsequent defeat in New York, are examined.
15	5	"Thomas Jefferson: Independence Declared"	Kevin Hershberger	Philip Boag, Jason Broome, Gardner Linn, Keith Palmer	July 10, 2016	TBA	N/A
Thomas Jefferson becomes the primary author of the Declaration of Independence, which is used as a rallying cry by George Washington for his troops, during a desperate 1776 campaign to keep New York from falling into British hands.
16	6	"Benedict Arnold: American Traitor"	Kevin Hershberger	Nate Adams, Jason Broome, Keith Palmer	July 17, 2016	TBA	N/A
Benedict Arnold goes from a respected Continental Army general to America's most notorious traitor, thanks to his plot to surrender West Point to the British and switch sides.
17	7	"Francis Marion: American Guerrilla Fighter"	Kevin Hershberger	Jason Broome, Gardner Linn, Simon Sandquist	July 24, 2016	TBA	N/A
A profile of Francis Marion, a South Carolina militia officer, known for his guerrilla tactics that frustrated and tormented the occupying British army.
18	8	"President George Washington - Forged in Conflict"	Kevin Hershberger	Jason Broome, Ralph Greco, Keith Palmer, Gardner Linn	July 31, 2016	TBA	N/A
America is a sovereign nation after the Revolution but is beset by squabbling factions and financial debt. George Washington comes out of retirement and is elected president and works to guarantee the rights for which he and his comrades fought so hard.
19	9	"Alexander Hamilton & Aaron Burr - Deadly Division"	Kevin Hershberger	Jason Broome, Keith Palmer, Gardner Linn	August 7, 2016	TBA	N/A
The season finale chronicles the dawn of the 19th century, under two-term President Thomas Jefferson and the duel between his vice president, Aaron Burr, and one of his chief rivals, Alexander Hamilton, in 1804.
20	10	"Forgotten Heroes"	Kevin Hershberger	Jason Broome, Ralph Greco, Gardner Linn	December 11, 2016	TBA	N/A
Black slaves join the Continental Army in the fight for independence.
21	11	"America's First Christmas"	Kevin Hershberger	Jason Broome, Claire Callahan, Kevin Huffman, Gardner Linn, Keith Palmer, Wendy Nardi	December 18, 2016	TBA	N/A
George Washington leads his men across the icy Delaware River into a bloody, barefoot march to Trenton and the brutal Hessian fighters who await them.
22	12	"How Freedom Was Won"	Kevin Hershberger	Unknown	January 1, 2017	TBA	N/A

=== Season 3 (2018) ===
The third season is about the American Civil War.

Season 3
No. overall	No. in season	Title	Original release date
23	1	"John Brown: This Guilty Land"	March 25, 2018
24	2	"Abraham Lincoln: The War Begins"	April 1, 2018
25	3	"Robert E. Lee: Choosing Sides"	April 8, 2018
26	4	"Frederick Douglass: The Dawn of a New Day"	April 15, 2018
27	5	"Stonewall Jackson: Friendly Fire"	April 22, 2018
28	6	"Gettysburg: The High Water Mark"	April 29, 2018
29	7	"Ulysses S. Grant: Intoxicated by War"	May 6, 2018
30	8	"Jefferson Davis: The Black Flag"	May 13, 2018
31	9	"Abraham Lincoln: The Campaign"	May 20, 2018
32	10	"William Tecumseh Sherman: Total War"	May 27, 2018
33	11	"John Wilkes Booth: The Killing of Lincoln"	June 3, 2018
34	12	"The Civil War: Brother vs. Brother"	June 10, 2018

== Production ==
One of the locations used for filming the second season was Old Salem in Winston-Salem, North Carolina.

== Reception ==
The premiere-weekend episodes, run back to back on Sunday, April 12, 2015, beat all other cable-news programs in its time slot and for the night overall in the Nielsen ratings.
