= A Bold Fresh Piece of Humanity =

2008 memoir by Bill O'Reilly

A Bold Fresh Piece of Humanity: A Memoir
- Author: Bill O'Reilly
- Language: English
- Genre: Non-Fiction
- Published: 2008 (Broadway Books)
- Publication place: United States
- Media type: Print (Hardback), Internets
- Pages: 256
- ISBN: 0-7679-2882-2
- OCLC: 229432636
- LC Class: PN4874.O73 A3

A Bold Fresh Piece of Humanity: A Memoir is a memoir by American political commentator Bill O'Reilly, published in 2008.

It was published on September 23, 2008. It recounts his early life and includes his accounts of people who influenced him. It opened at number 2 on the New York Times Best Seller list. The book spent 8 weeks on New York Times' Best Sellers, Hardcover Nonfiction list.
