= Culture Warrior =

2006 political book by Bill O'Reilly

- Author: Bill O'Reilly
- Language: English
- Genre: Political
- Published: September 25, 2006, Broadway Books
- Publication place: United States
- Media type: Print (Hardback)
- Pages: 240
- ISBN: 0-7679-2092-9
- OCLC: 70129214
- Dewey Decimal: 306.0973/09045 22
- LC Class: HN65 .O74 2006

Culture Warrior is a book by former Fox News Channel political commentator Bill O'Reilly, published in the fall of 2006. O'Reilly asserts that the United States is in the midst of a "culture war" between "traditionalists" and "secular-progressives". O'Reilly appeared on The Colbert Report to promote the book and revealed he is in the Grand Canyon in the picture on the cover.

O'Reilly declares war against "the committed forces of the secular-progressive movement that want to dramatically change America, molding it in the image of Western Europe". The term secular progressive, often abbreviated as "S-P", is used extensively throughout the book. O'Reilly's S-Ps are virtual socialists who are hostile to Christianity and traditional American values. Funded by a few far-left billionaires, he asserts that the S-Ps are implementing change in the United States by dominating major newspapers and network television, through the work of such organizations as the American Civil Liberties Union, and by "judicial fiat".

== Traditionalists ==
O'Reilly defines a Traditionalist as someone who believes that the United States is, more often than not, a noble country that has made some mistakes. For O'Reilly, Traditionalists believe in the family unit and place emphasis on spirituality, selflessness, and charitable causes. He states that Traditionalists are not restricted to any one political ideology. While O'Reilly cites examples of Democrats who are also Traditionalists, including President John F. Kennedy, Martin Luther King Jr. and Senator Joseph Lieberman, he writes that the Democratic Party is increasingly being taken over by the S-P Movement. Likewise, O'Reilly states that some far-right groups are not Traditionalists, such as some militia groups and the Ku Klux Klan.

== The Secular Progressive Movement ==
According to O'Reilly, the "Secular Progressive Movement" is a minority left wing group of Americans whose non-traditional ideals have become a talking point in recent years for conservative commentators. O'Reilly states that the movement is led by media billionaire George Soros, who provides large amounts of money to liberal and secular-progressive organizations such as moveon.org. O'Reilly has identified the groups and organizations that apply to this label, including Hollywood liberals, Al Franken, UC Berkeley Professor George Lakoff and the American Civil Liberties Union (ACLU), who have been called a threat to traditional American society.

Also, O'Reilly goes on to identify the various members of the "secular-progressive army". Specifically, he contends that the ACLU and similar legal organizations form the "shock troops," who have "blitzed the legal system" in an attempt to "secure secular policies without having to go to the ballot box." According to O'Reilly, these troops are aided and abetted by "mainstream media enablers," who provide "aid and comfort to the frontline troops and are invaluable in getting their message out to an even wider audience."

== Accusations of fascism against the ACLU ==
O'Reilly has called the American Civil Liberties Union a "fascist organization," believing they seek to impose a secular-progressive world view on America by "gaming the legal system." As an example, he cites the gay-marriage ruling of the Supreme Court of Massachusetts (Goodridge v. Department of Public Health) :

The ACLU, on the front lines, is extremely aggressive and well funded, as I have stated [referring to George Soros]. That means they are serious people. On my programs, I have called this crew a "fascist organization" because they seek to impose their world view on America — not by the popular vote, which is the way it is supposed to be done in a democracy, but by "gaming" the legal system. Because they know that they will never, ever achieve their goals on Election Day, their strategy is to rely on activist left-wing judges to bring about secular changes in our laws. The most notorious example of this strategy is the gay-marriage ruling in Massachusetts. The ACLU helpfully pointed out to the Supreme Court of the Commonwealth that the state constitution had an apparent loophole: that is, the document failed to define marriage specifically as between one man and one woman. Presto! With the stroke of a pen, the liberal court wiped out more than three hundred years of legal traditional marriage going back to the founding of the Massachusetts Bay Colony. The ACLU was in ecstasy. To this culture warrior, gay marriage is not a vital issue. I don't believe the republic will collapse if Larry marries Brendan. However, it is clear that most Americans want heterosexual marriage to maintain its special place in American society. And as long as gays are not penalized in the civil arena, I think the folks should make the call at the ballot box. Traditional marriage is widely seen as a social stabilizer, and I believe that is true. But if you are trying to secularize American society, gay marriage is a good place to start — thus the ACLU's fervor on this issue.

O'Reilly generally asserts that "secular progressives" are misguided individuals who share general political beliefs, such as little or no acknowledgment of God or other higher powers in public; the practice of wealth redistribution or the taking money from the affluent and giving to the less fortunate; opening national borders to create a "unified world"; legalization of drugs; and belief in provision of "prosperity" and entitlements by the government to the populace.

== Critical reaction ==
Culture Warrior received a mixed critical reception. Gossip columnist Liz Smith praised O'Reilly's writing as "diamond bright, ready to pounce, and never at a loss for words".

Others were more critical, however; Publishers Weekly called it "more resentful and self-pitying than feisty." Elbert Ventura of progressive watchdog group Media Matters for America, a group that has a long history of being critical of O'Reilly, accused O'Reilly of making baseless claims, writing "It seems O'Reilly feels he is entitled to his own facts as well."

== See also ==
- Progressivism
- Secularism
