= The O'Reilly Factor for Kids =

2004 book by Bill O'Reilly

- Author: Bill O'Reilly
- Original title: The O'Reilly Factor
- Language: English
- Genre: Fiction
- Publisher: HarperEntertainment
- Publication date: September 28, 2004
- Publication place: United States
- Media type: Print (Hardcover)
- Pages: 208
- ISBN: 0-06-054424-4
- OCLC: 54685760
- Dewey Decimal: 646.7/00835 22
- LC Class: HQ796 .O655 2004

The O'Reilly Factor for Kids: A Survival Guide for America's Youth is a book written by Fox News Channel commentator Bill O'Reilly. It was published in 2004 and covers issues that kids face in their teenage years, such as drugs, sexual intercourse, money, smoking, alcohol and friends.

== Reception ==
The New York Times said the book "is best understood not as a useful guide for adolescents" but "as an extension of the Bill O'Reilly brand". Writing in The Village Voice, Alan Scherstuhl called the book "crap", noting that it contained the "barking, pugilistic style of his TV and radio shows". Rebecca Onion, in PopMatters, said the book's advice "is innocuous, bordering on helpful" but that O'Reilly mistakenly believes that "everything that works for him will work for others" and that the book features "cringeworthy" sections that engage in "kid talk."
