= Rebecca Diamond =

American journalist

- Born: Rebecca Lee Gomez; January 30, 1967 (age 59); San Jose, California, U.S.
- Education: University of Maryland, College Park (BA)
- Occupation: Television newscaster
- Spouse: Brett Edward Diamond (m. 2008)

Rebecca Diamond (born January 30, 1967) is a former contributor on the Fox Business Network and the Fox News Channel.

== Biography ==
Born Rebecca Lee Gomez, the daughter of Nadine Ramirez and Leandro Olmos Gomez, Diamond graduated in 1991 from the University of Maryland, College Park, where she majored in Broadcast Journalism. She worked as an anchor/reporter for Lifetime Television and as a business writer for The Associated Press. She also worked as a reporter/anchor for local affiliate television stations in McAllen, Texas; Phoenix, Arizona; and San Diego, California. She joined Fox News as a news update anchor when the network was launched in 1996.

She hosted the Fox Business Network TV show Happy Hour which was broadcast live from the Bull & Bear bar in the Waldorf Astoria Hotel in New York City. Happy Hour aired at 5pm Eastern on the Fox Business Network; the final episode was aired on June 4, 2010. Diamond now appears as a contributor on other Fox News Channel and Fox Business Network. Diamond has a fan following on Facebook.

In 2008, she married Brett Edward Diamond in a Roman Catholic ceremony at St. Vincent Ferrer Church in Manhattan presided over by Fox news contributor Father Jonathan Morris. She was born in San Jose, California and currently lives in New Jersey.

In 2011, Diamond sued Bill O'Reilly for sexual harassment after her contract with Fox Business was not renewed. They settled, and O'Reilly personally paid the amount.
