= The Rumble in the Air-Conditioned Auditorium =

Debate between Bill O'Reilly and Jon Stewart

- Date: October 6, 2012
- Location: Lisner Auditorium George Washington University, Washington, D.C.
- Participants: Bill O'Reilly; Jon Stewart

The Rumble in the Air-Conditioned Auditorium: O'Reilly vs. Stewart 2012 was a debate between Bill O'Reilly of The O'Reilly Factor and Jon Stewart of The Daily Show and moderated by CNN news anchor E. D. Hill. It took place on October 6, 2012, in Washington, D.C., starting at 8 pm with most of its audience viewing via Internet stream and subsequent download. According to The New York Times, O'Reilly and Stewart "have been guests on each other’s programs since 2001" but "rarely agree on anything except their mutual respect for each other".

The name of the event evokes the 1974 boxing match the Rumble in the Jungle; each participant was given a "championship belt" by the moderator following the debate.

The format of the debate was broken up into two sections: the first half followed the usual "presidential debate" format, while for the second half, the three took seats closer to the audience and answered questions posted by the audience and viewers on the Internet. While the discussion topics were essentially the same as the presidential debate a few days prior, much of the event was laced with humor: an oft-reused gag was the notable height difference between 6 ft 4 in (1.93 m) O'Reilly and the 5 ft 7 in (1.70 m) Stewart – to compensate, Stewart had a mechanical riser built into his podium, which he would often use for comic effect.

== Viewing ==
Promotional posters had explicitly announced, "It's why Al Gore invented the Internet." A live internet stream and downloadable video files were offered for $4.95, with O'Reilly and Stewart donating half of the net profits to a number of charitable causes. The day after the debate was announced, tickets to attend the event live at the Lisner Auditorium at George Washington University were sold out.

Technical troubles arose at the start of the debate, preventing thousands of users from being able to watch the event live. The event's Facebook page cited overwhelming demand as the cause. Many were outraged since they sold the online tickets beforehand and were still unprepared. Nox Solutions was cited as the company providing streaming services for the event.

== Reactions ==
USA Today wrote: "It may not have been the most important debate of the 2012 presidential election season but it was certainly, so far, the most entertaining."

The Tampa Bay Times wrote of the event: "O'Reilly and Stewart attacked each other's arguments but not their personalities, armed with facts and a fair bit of passion. They didn't replace traditional news sources or change many minds, but they did offer a blueprint for debate that can inform, entertain and push forward the bounds of public discussion at once."

At a post-debate press conference, Time noted that Stewart "resisted attempts to analyze the meaning and influence of the event" and that he had similarly maintained his 2010 "Rally to Restore Sanity" was purely for entertainment value.

The Christian Science Monitor described The Rumble as "a giant promotion to attract more followers" to The Daily Show with Jon Stewart on Comedy Central and The O’Reilly Factor on Fox News" with the potential to serve as infotainment that would raise civic engagement. However, Nicholas Sywak of Salon.com felt the entertainment value was lacking and that it was "barely worth $4.95, much less a Saturday night."

== See also ==
- Political views of Bill O'Reilly
