= The Radio Factor =

- Running time: 120 minutes
- Country of origin: United States
- Home station: Fox News Talk
- Starring: Bill O'Reilly (M-Th); Lis Wiehl; Michael Smerconish (rotating); Doug McIntyre (rotating)
- Created by: Bill O'Reilly
- Original release: 2002 – 2009
- Website: http://billoreilly.com

The Radio Factor is a US nationally syndicated talk radio program, which aired from 2002 to 2009 and was hosted mainly by Bill O'Reilly.

== Show ==
The program, which featured host commentary with a mix of listener call-in and guest segments, was broadcast live every weekday from the Fox News Channel studios in New York City from 12:00 p.m. to 2:00 p.m. (total runtime approximately 120 minutes, less 34 for commercials) and was distributed by Westwood One in conjunction with Fox News Radio.

Bill O'Reilly was the host of the program from Monday through Thursday and was joined by co-host Lis Wiehl two days in the week. E.D. Hill was a former co-host as well. On Fridays, the show was usually hosted by a guest host; the most recent rotation included Michael Smerconish, Dom Giordano (Both from CBS Radio's Philadelphia Station, WPHT-AM) and Doug McIntyre (Tony Snow also was a regular substitute for this show until his 2008 death).

The show launched on May 8, 2002 on 205 stations, in 19 of the top 20 markets across the country; as of the end of 2008, his affiliate count was over 400. In addition to terrestrial radio, the show could be heard live on Fox News Talk, available on XM Satellite Radio and SIRIUS Satellite Radio, as well as simulcast over the Internet. February 26, 2009 was the last broadcast with Bill O'Reilly. A news story at the time reported O'Reilly as saying the workload for his radio and TV duties had become too much. The Fred Thompson Show replaced O'Reilly the following March 2.

According to the September 2007 issue of Talkers Magazine, in terms of audience The Radio Factor was in the top twelve of nationally aired talk shows. It was the second-highest rated show in its time slot, behind only The Rush Limbaugh Show.

== Aftermath ==
Wiehl would later accuse O'Reilly of a non-consensual sexual relationship, though she would later retract that claim in exchange for a financial settlement, one of many settlements O'Reilly negotiated that led to his dismissal from Fox News.

Ten years after The Radio Factor ended, O'Reilly returned to radio with a daily 15-minute show, The O'Reilly Update.

== See also ==
- Fox News Channel
- The O'Reilly Factor
