= Bill O'Reilly (political commentator) =

American television host and writer (born 1949)

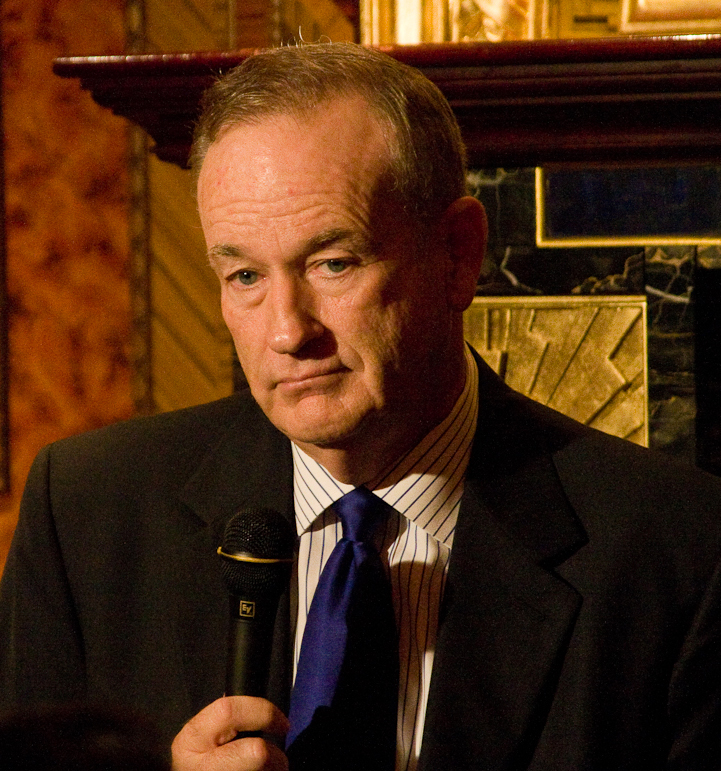
- O'Reilly in 2010
- Born: William James O'Reilly Jr. September 10, 1949 (age 77); New York City, U.S.
- Education: Marist College (BA); Boston University (MA); Harvard University (MPA)
- Occupations: Television host; political commentator; author
- Years active: 1975–present
- Political party: Republican (before 2001); Independence (2001–present)
- Spouse: Maureen McPhilmy (m. 1996; div. 2011)
- Children: 2
- Website: billoreilly.com

William James O'Reilly Jr. (born September 10, 1949) is an American conservative commentator, journalist, author, and television host.

O'Reilly's broadcasting career began during the late 1970s and 1980s, when he reported for local television stations in the United States and later for CBS News and ABC News, the former of which earned O'Reilly two Emmy Awards and two National Headliner Awards for excellence in reporting. He anchored the tabloid television program Inside Edition from 1989 to 1995. O'Reilly joined the Fox News Channel in 1996 and hosted the news commentary program The O'Reilly Factor until 2017. The O'Reilly Factor had been the highest-rated cable news show for 16 years, and he was described by media analyst Howard Kurtz as "the biggest star in the 20-year history at Fox News" at the time of his departure.

During his time at Fox News, he appeared several times as a guest on the Comedy Central talk show The Daily Show with Jon Stewart. Together he and Jon Stewart debated for a charity event, The Rumble in the Air-Conditioned Auditorium at George Washington University in 2012. O'Reilly interviewed President Barack Obama before Super Bowl XLVIII in 2014. He co-authored with Martin Dugard numerous The New York Times bestselling historical novels including Killing Lincoln (2011), Killing Kennedy (2012), Killing Jesus (2013), and Killing Reagan (2015), which were adapted into National Geographic television films in 2011, 2013, 2015, and 2016. Two of the films earned O'Reilly nominations for two Primetime Emmy Awards. He also hosted The Radio Factor from 2002 to 2009.

In 2017, O'Reilly was dismissed from Fox News following a report by The New York Times that he had settled five lawsuits involving sexual misconduct. Since then, O'Reilly has hosted the No Spin News podcast where it has also expanded into a television program, first airing on Newsmax, then on The First. He also makes appearances on NewsNation frequently, discussing political topics that arise.

== Early life and education ==
O'Reilly was born on September 10, 1949, at Columbia Presbyterian Hospital in Washington Heights, Manhattan to parents William James Sr. and Winifred Angela (née Drake) O'Reilly from Brooklyn and Teaneck, New Jersey, respectively. He is of Irish descent with a small degree of English (Colonial American) ancestry. Some of his father's ancestors lived in County Cavan, Ireland, since the early eighteenth century, and on his mother's side he has ancestry from Northern Ireland. The O'Reilly family lived in a small apartment in Fort Lee, New Jersey, when their son was born. In 1951, his family moved to Levittown on Long Island. O'Reilly has a sister, Janet.

O'Reilly attended St. Brigid/Our Lady of Hope Regional School in Westbury and Chaminade High School, a private Catholic boys high school, in Mineola. His father wanted him to attend Chaminade, but O'Reilly wanted to attend W. Tresper Clarke High School, the public school most of his closest friends would attend. He played Little League baseball and was the goalie on the Chaminade varsity hockey team. During his high school years, he met future singer Billy Joel, whom O'Reilly described as a "hoodlum". O'Reilly recollected in an interview with Michael Kay on the YES Network show CenterStage that Joel "was in the Hicksville section—the same age as me—and he was a hood. He used to slick it [his hair] . . his guys would smoke and this and that, and we were more jocks."

After graduating from Chaminade in 1967, O'Reilly attended Marist College in Poughkeepsie, New York. While at Marist, he was a punter in the National Club Football Association and also wrote for the school's newspaper, The Circle. He was an honors student who majored in history. He spent his junior year of college abroad, attending Queen Mary College at the University of London. He received his Bachelor of Arts degree in history in 1971. He played semi-professional baseball during this time as a pitcher for the New York Monarchs. After graduating from Marist College, O'Reilly moved to Miami where he taught English and history at Monsignor Pace High School from 1970 to 1972. He returned to school in 1973 and earned a Master of Arts degree in broadcast journalism from Boston University. While attending Boston University, he was a reporter and columnist for various local newspapers and alternative news weeklies, including the Boston Phoenix, and did an internship in the newsroom of WBZ-TV. In 1995, he attended the John F. Kennedy School of Government at Harvard University and received a master of public administration degree in 1996.

Marist College had bestowed an honorary degree upon O'Reilly, which would later be revoked once the sexual abuse allegations came to light.

== Broadcasting career ==
=== 1973–1980: Early career ===
O'Reilly's early television news career included reporting and anchoring positions at WNEP-TV in Scranton, Pennsylvania, where he also reported the weather. At WFAA-TV in Dallas, O'Reilly was awarded the Dallas Press Club Award for excellence in investigative reporting. He then moved to KMGH-TV in Denver, where he won a local Emmy Award for his coverage of a skyjacking. O'Reilly also worked for WFSB in Hartford, Connecticut, from 1979 to 1980. In 1980, O'Reilly anchored the local news-feature program 7:30 Magazine at WCBS-TV in New York. Soon after, as a WCBS News anchor and correspondent, he won his second local Emmy, which was for an investigation of corrupt city marshals.

=== 1982–1986: CBS News and return to local television ===
In 1982, he became a CBS News correspondent, covering the wars in El Salvador on location and in the Falkland Islands from his base in Buenos Aires, Argentina. O'Reilly left CBS over a dispute concerning the uncredited use in a report by Bob Schieffer of footage of a riot in response to the military junta's surrender shot by O'Reilly's crew in Buenos Aires shortly after the conclusion of the war.

After departing CBS News in 1982, O'Reilly joined WNEV-TV (now WHDH) in Boston, as a weekday reporter, weekend anchor and later as host of the station's local news magazine New England Afternoon. In 1984, O'Reilly went to KATU in Portland, Oregon, where he remained for nine months, then he returned to Boston and joined WCVB-TV as reporter and columnist-at-large for NewsCenter 5.

=== 1986–1989: ABC News ===
In 1986, O'Reilly moved to ABC News, where, during his three-year tenure, he received two Emmy Awards and two National Headliner Awards for excellence in reporting. He had delivered a eulogy for his friend Joe Spencer, an ABC News correspondent who died in a helicopter crash on January 22, 1986, en route to covering the 1985–86 Hormel strike. ABC News president Roone Arledge, who attended Spencer's funeral, decided to hire O'Reilly after hearing the eulogy. At ABC, O'Reilly hosted daytime news briefs that previewed stories to be reported on the day's World News Tonight and worked as a general assignment reporter for ABC News programs, including Good Morning America, Nightline, and World News Tonight.

=== 1989–1995: Inside Edition ===
In 1989, O'Reilly joined the nationally syndicated King World (now CBS Media Ventures)-produced Inside Edition, a tabloid-gossip television program in competition with A Current Affair. He became the program's anchor three weeks into its run after the involvement of original anchor David Frost had ended.

In 1995, former NBC News and CBS News anchor Deborah Norville replaced O'Reilly on Inside Edition; O'Reilly had expressed a desire to quit the show in July 1994.

==== Viral video ====
On May 12, 2008, an outtake of O'Reilly ranting during his time at Inside Edition surfaced on YouTube. The video from 1993 depicts O'Reilly yelling and cursing at his co-workers while having issues pre-recording the closing lines on his teleprompter, eventually yelling the phrase "We'll do it live, fuck it!" before continuing the closing segment to his show. The original video, titled "Bill O'Reilly Flips Out," was removed, but another user uploaded it once again the day after and retitled it "Bill O'Reilly Goes Nuts". Immediately after the video surfaced, O'Reilly acknowledged the video's existence, claiming that he was amusing his co-workers and said, "I have plenty of much newer stuff... If you want to buy the tapes that I have, I'm happy to sell them to you." The rant was later parodied by Stephen Colbert on The Colbert Report as well as Family Guy and by Trevor Noah on The Daily Show, and was named one of Time's "Top 10 Celebrity Meltdowns". In October 2008, Wednesday 13 named his first live album after a line in the rant. In 2009, a "dance remix" of O'Reilly's rant was nominated for a Webby Award for "Best Viral Video" but lost to "The Website Is Down: Sales Guy vs. Web Dude".

=== 1996–2017: The O'Reilly Factor ===
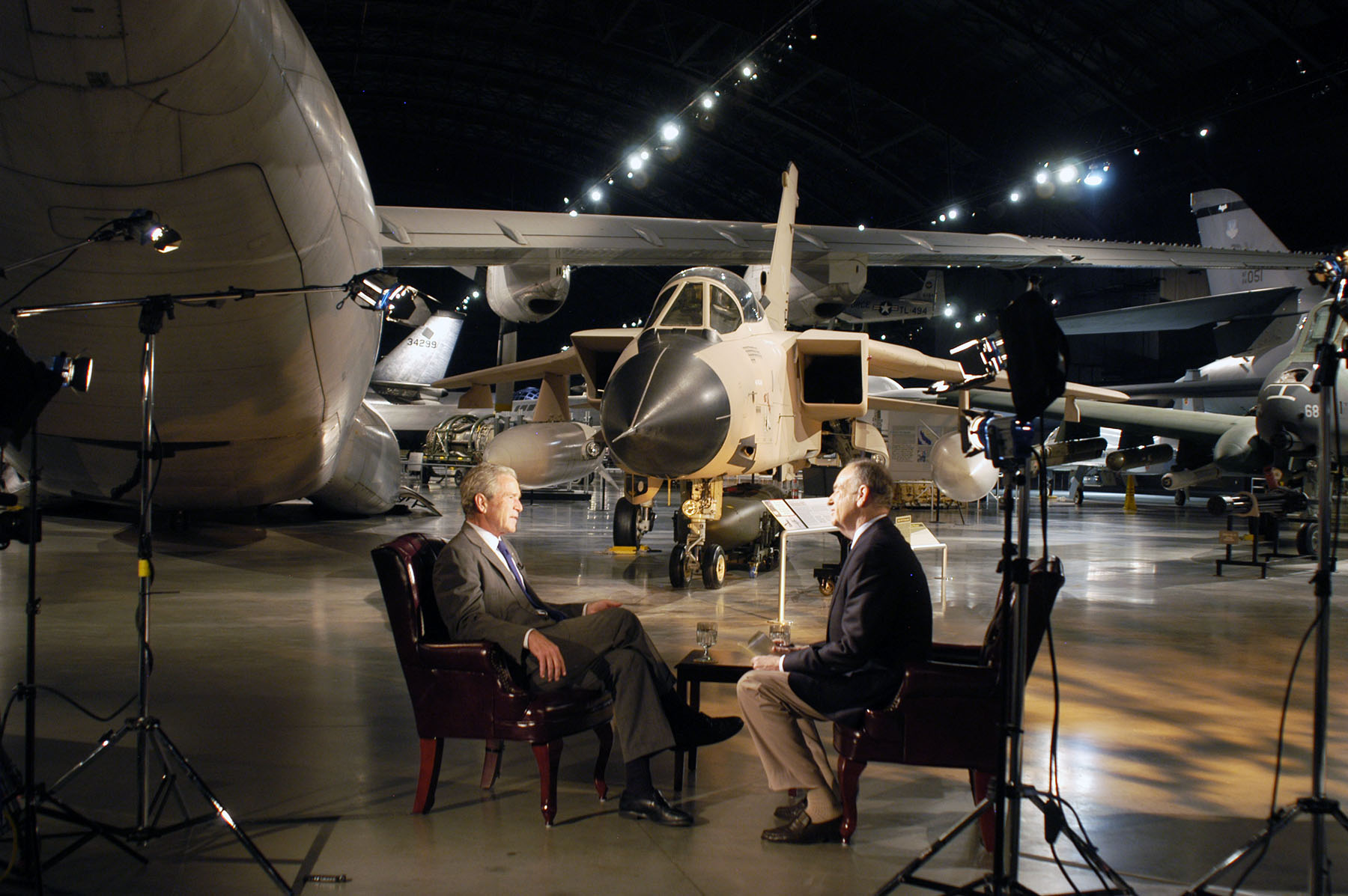
O'Reilly interviewing President George W. Bush in 2010

In October 1996, O'Reilly was hired by Roger Ailes, chairman and CEO of the then startup Fox News Channel, to anchor The O'Reilly Report. The show was renamed The O'Reilly Factor after his friend and branding expert John Tantillo's remarks upon the "O'Reilly Factor" in any of the stories he told. The program was routinely the highest-rated show of the three major U.S. 24-hour cable news television channels and began the trend toward more opinion-oriented prime-time cable news programming. The show was taped late in the afternoon at a studio in New York City and aired every weekday on the Fox News Channel at 8:00 p.m. Eastern Time and was rebroadcast at 11:00 p.m.

Progressive media monitoring organizations such as Media Matters and Fairness and Accuracy in Reporting have criticized his reporting on a variety of issues, accusing him of distorting facts and using misleading or erroneous statistics. In 2008, citing numerous inaccuracies in his reporting, MediaMatters for America awarded him its first annual "Misinformer of the Year" award.

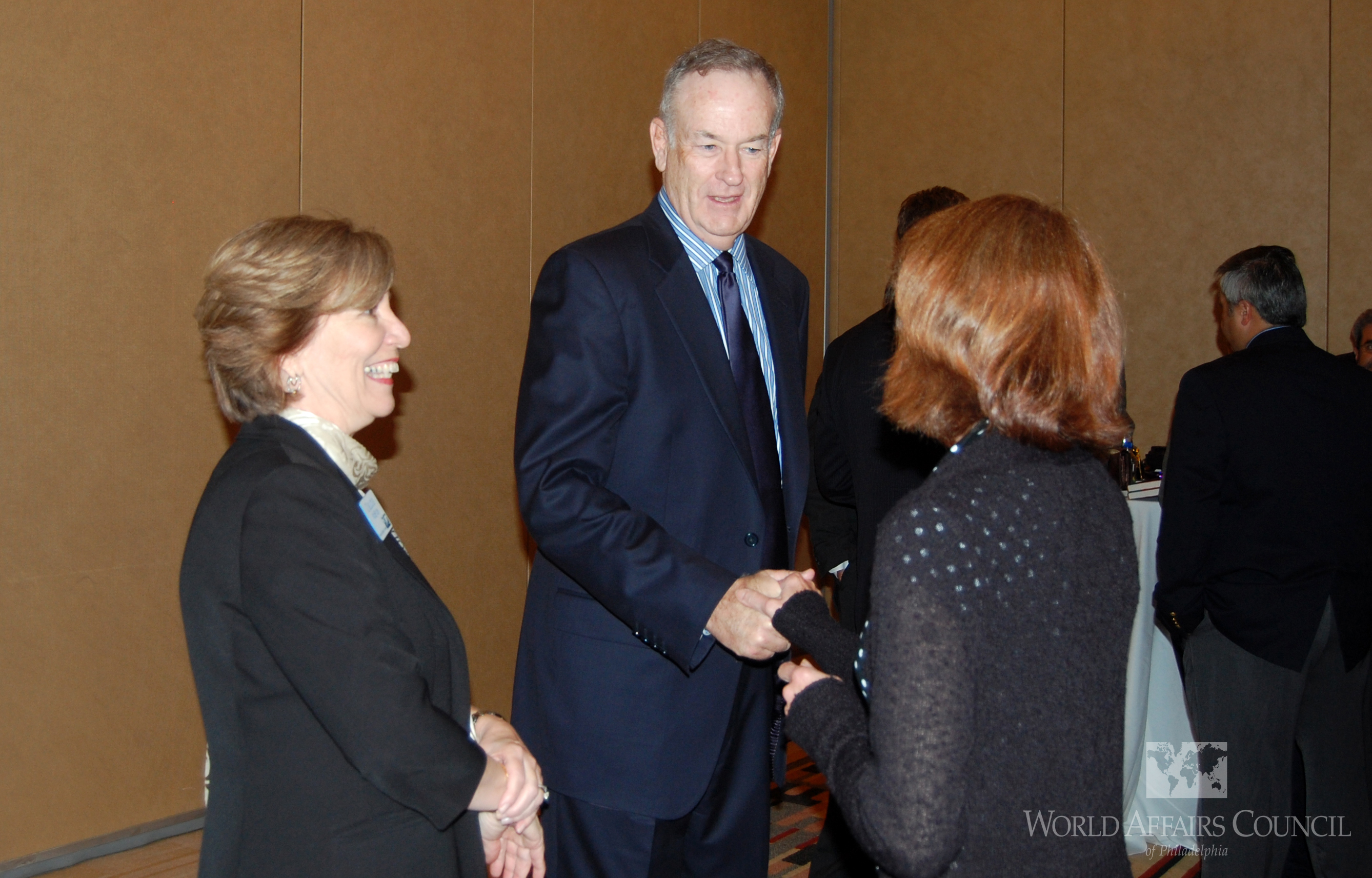
O'Reilly at the World Affairs Councils of America in Philadelphia, 2010

After the September 11 attacks, O'Reilly accused the United Way of America and American Red Cross of failing to deliver millions of dollars in donated money, raised by the organizations in the name of the disaster, to the families of those killed in the attacks. He reported that the organizations misrepresented their intentions for the money being raised by not distributing all of the 9/11 relief fund to the victims. Actor George Clooney responded, accusing him of misstating facts and harming the relief effort by inciting "panic" among potential donors. On August 27, 2002, O'Reilly called for all Americans to boycott Pepsi products, saying that lyrics of Ludacris (then appearing in ads for Pepsi) glamorize a "life of guns, violence, drugs and disrespect of women". The next day, O'Reilly reported that Pepsi had fired Ludacris. Two years later, Ludacris referenced O'Reilly in the song "Number One Spot" with the lyrics "Respected highly, hi, Mr. O'Reilly/Hope all is well, kiss the plaintiff and the wifey," in reference to his sexual harassment suit with Andrea Mackris while married. In an interview with RadarOnline.com in 2010, Ludacris said he and O'Reilly had made amends after a conversation at a charity event.

Speaking on ABC's Good Morning America on March 18, 2003, he promised that "[i]f the Americans go in and overthrow Saddam Hussein and it's clean [of weapons of mass destruction] ... I will apologize to the nation, and I will not trust the Bush administration again." In another appearance on the same program on February 10, 2004, he responded to repeated requests for him to honor his pledge: "My analysis was wrong and I'm sorry. I was wrong. I'm not pleased about it at all." With regard to his trust in the government, he said, "I am much more skeptical of the Bush administration now than I was at that time."

Beginning in 2005, he periodically denounced George Tiller, a Kansas-based physician who specialized in second- and third-trimester abortions, often referring to him as "Tiller the baby killer". Tiller was murdered on May 31, 2009, by Scott Roeder, an anti-abortion activist. Critics such as Salon's Gabriel Winant have asserted that his anti-Tiller rhetoric helped to create an atmosphere of violence around the doctor. Jay Bookman of The Atlanta Journal-Constitution wrote that O'Reilly "clearly went overboard in his condemnation and demonization of Tiller" but added that it was "irresponsible to link O'Reilly" to Tiller's murder. O'Reilly responded to the criticism by saying, "No backpedaling here ... every single thing we said about Tiller was true."

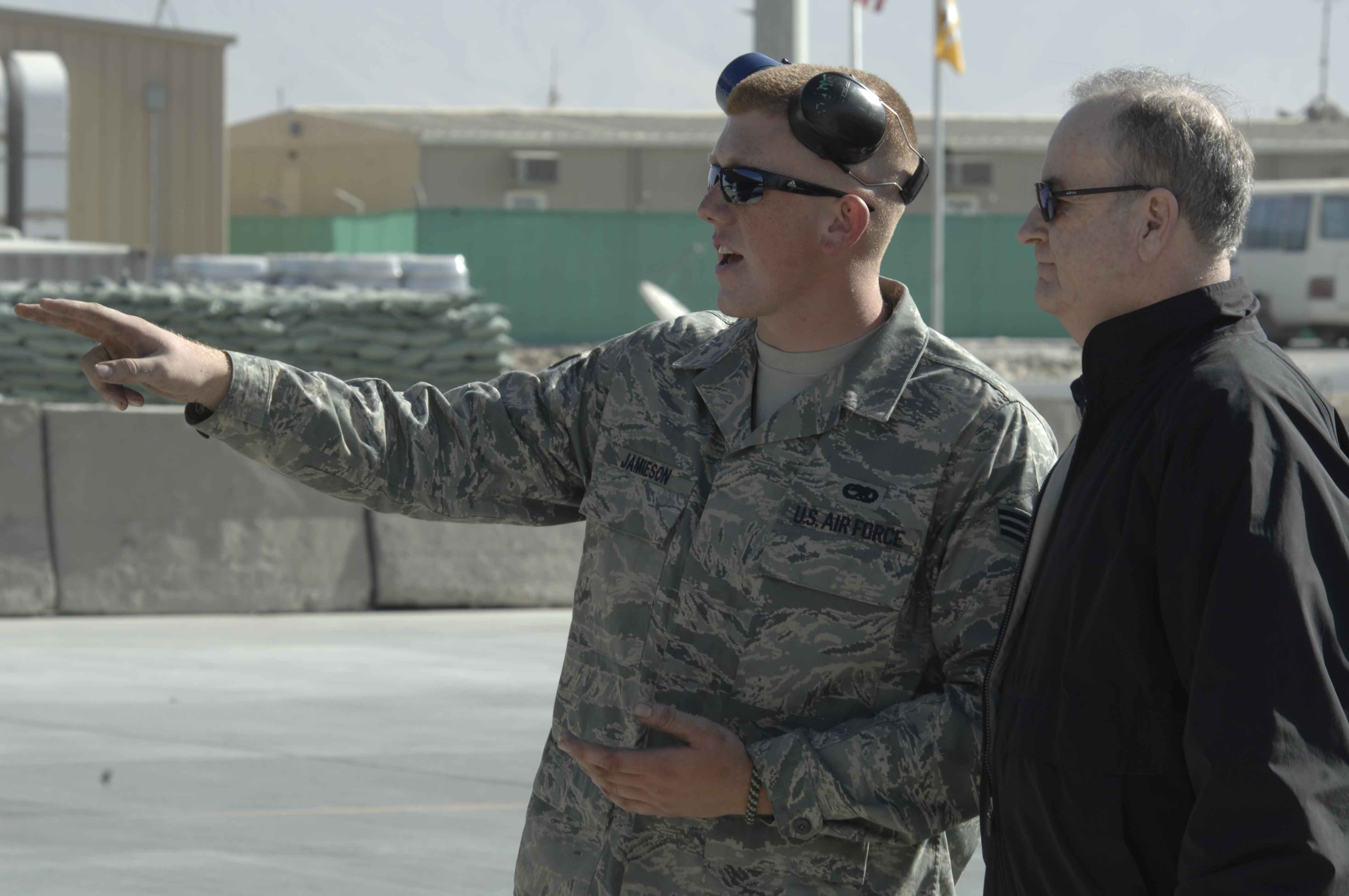
O'Reilly at Bagram Air Force Base with A1C Jeffrey Jamieson in 2007

In early 2007, researchers from the Indiana University School of Journalism published a report that analyzed his "Talking Points Memo" segment. Using analysis techniques developed in the 1930s by the Institute for Propaganda Analysis, the study concluded that he used propaganda, frequently engaged in name calling, and consistently cast non-Americans as threats and never "in the role of victim or hero". He responded, asserting that "the terms 'conservative', 'liberal', 'left', 'right', 'progressive', 'traditional' and 'centrist' were considered name-calling if they were associated with a problem or social ill." The study's authors said that those terms were only considered name-calling when linked to derogatory qualifiers. Fox News producer Ron Mitchell wrote an op-ed in which he accused the study's authors of seeking to manipulate their research to fit a predetermined outcome. Mitchell argued that by using tools developed for examining propaganda, the researchers presupposed that he propagandized.

==== Departure from Fox News ====
In April 2017, The New York Times reported that Fox News and O'Reilly had settled five lawsuits involving women who accused O'Reilly of misconduct. After the settlements were reported, The O'Reilly Factor lost more than half its advertisers within a week; almost 60 companies withdrew their television advertising from the show amid a growing backlash against O'Reilly. On April 11, O'Reilly announced he would take a two-week vacation and would return to the program on April 24; he normally took a vacation around Easter. On April 19, Fox News announced that O'Reilly would not be returning to the network. The program was subsequently renamed The Factor on April 19 and aired three further episodes (two with guest host Dana Perino and one with Greg Gutfeld), the last airing on April 21.

After O'Reilly was fired, the financial markets responded positively to the decision by Fox News, and its parent company 21st Century Fox rose over two percent in the stock market the next day.

O'Reilly later stated his regret that he did not "fight back" against his accusers the way Sean Hannity did when facing the loss of advertisers around the same time.

=== 2017–present: Post-Fox News career ===
O'Reilly launched a podcast called No Spin News on April 24, 2017, after his departure from Fox News. In August 2017, O'Reilly began digitally streaming a video version of No Spin News. In May 2017, O'Reilly began to appear as a recurring guest on Friday editions of the Glenn Beck Radio Program. In June 2017, O'Reilly and Dennis Miller co-headlined the public speaking tour, "The Spin Stops Here".

O'Reilly made his first appearance on Fox News since his ouster on September 26, 2017, being interviewed by Sean Hannity. In 2019, O'Reilly started a 15-minute radio show, The O'Reilly Update. By 2020, simulcasts of O'Reilly's No Spin News show began to air on Newsmax TV. No Spin News began airing on The First TV in June 2020. O'Reilly participated in a speaking tour with former president Donald Trump in December 2021, which he said "[provided] a never before heard inside view of his administration".

== Other ventures ==
=== Newspaper column ===
O'Reilly wrote a weekly syndicated newspaper column through Creators Syndicate that appeared in numerous newspapers, including the New York Post and the Chicago Sun-Times. He discontinued the column at the end of 2013.

=== Radio work ===
From 2002 to 2009, he hosted a radio program called The Radio Factor that had more than 3.26 million listeners and was carried by more than 400 radio stations. According to the talk radio industry publication Talkers Magazine, he was No. 11 on the "Heavy Hundred," a list of the 100 most important talk show hosts in America.

In 2019, O'Reilly returned to radio with a daily 15-minute series The O'Reilly Update. The program airs during or near lunch hour on most stations in a time slot previously used by Paul Harvey. In September 2020, O'Reilly began hosting a daily radio show on 77WABC titled Common Sense with Bill O'Reilly.

=== The Daily Show with Jon Stewart ===
From 2001 to 2015, O'Reilly appeared on The Daily Show with Jon Stewart fifteen times. Stewart also appeared as a guest various times on The O'Reilly Factor. In 2011, Stewart described O'Reilly as "the voice of reason on Fox News", comparing him to "the thinnest kid at fat camp".

In 2012, Stewart joined O'Reilly in a debate for charity entitled, The Rumble in the Air-Conditioned Auditorium at George Washington University. The New York Times remarked that O'Reilly and Stewart "have been guests on each other's programs since 2001" but "rarely agree on anything except their mutual respect for each other". In 2014, Stewart debated him on the belief of white privilege. During the debate O'Reilly exclaimed, "You think I'm sitting here because I'm white? What are you, a moron? I'm sitting here because I'm obnoxious, not because I'm white!".

In 2015, O'Reilly briefly appeared on Stewart's final show as host of The Daily Show. O'Reilly joked, "Have fun feeding your rabbits, quitter!" O'Reilly also wrote a lengthy appreciation for Stewart in Deadline Hollywood writing, "[Stewart] will leave a void in the world of political satire. Undeniably, Jon Stewart was great at what he did. Whatever that was."

In 2024, when Stewart returned to The Daily Show for the 2024 United States presidential election, he invited O'Reilly to appear on the show following the assassination attempt on former president and candidate Donald Trump.

=== Film and television ===
O'Reilly made cameo appearances in the films An American Carol (2008), Iron Man 2 (2010), Transformers: Dark of the Moon (2011) and Man Down (2015).

In 2010 he famously appeared on The View, where they asked O'Reilly his opinion on whether to remove the mosque near the 9/11 memorial site. O'Reilly responded saying, that he believed they should and during the heated discussion stated, "Muslims killed us on 9/11" to which Whoopi Goldberg and Joy Behar walked off the set. Barbara Walters chided the other hosts, and stated, "You have just seen what should not happen. We should be able to have discussions without washing our hands and screaming and walking off stage. I love my colleagues, but that should not have happened." He also made appearances on various talk and late night shows including, The Daily Show with Jon Stewart, The Late Show with David Letterman, The Tonight Show with Jimmy Fallon, Jimmy Kimmel Live, and The Late Show with Stephen Colbert.

In 2013 he appeared at the Kennedy Center Honors ceremony where he gave tribute to jazz musician Herbie Hancock. O'Reilly's unexpected presence was not lost on the audience, as his appearance elicited audible gasps from the crowd to which O'Reilly responded, "I know I'm surprised too." During his tribute to Hancock, O'Reilly stated, "Herbie is a true gentleman. His fame and his skill reflect the values of that have made this country great...It's that embracing of what is good in mankind that that infuses Hancock's music and makes him a national icon."

O'Reilly was an executive producer on many television projects including on made for television films based upon his books. This includes films, Killing Lincoln (2013), Killing Kennedy (2013), Killing Jesus (2015), and Killing Reagan (2016) which aired on National Geographic. O'Reilly received two Primetime Emmy Award nominations for Outstanding Television Movie for Killing Kennedy and Killing Jesus. From 2015 to 2018, O'Reilly also served as an executive producer on the documentary series, Legends & Lies.

== Filmography ==
=== Film ===
Year	Title	Role	Ref.
2010	Iron Man 2	Bill O'Reilly	
2011	Transformers: Dark of the Moon	Bill O'Reilly	
2015	Man Down	Bill O'Reilly	

=== Television ===
Year	Title	Role	Notes	Ref.
1996–2017	The O'Reilly Factor	Himself	20 seasons; also producer	
2001–2024	The Daily Show with Jon Stewart	Himself	14 episodes	
2003	JAG	Bill O'Reilly	Episode: "Friendly Fire"	
2011	Rizzoli & Isles	Bill O'Reilly	Episode: "Can I Get a Witness"	
2011	Killing Lincoln	—N/a	Executive producer	
2013	Killing Kennedy	—N/a	Executive producer	
2015	Killing Jesus	—N/a	Executive producer	
2015–2018	Legends & Lies	—N/a	Executive producer	
2016	Killing Reagan	—N/a	Executive producer	

== Awards and nominations ==
Over his career O'Reilly has received numerous accolades for his work as a reporter and television journalist. In Dallas, O'Reilly won a Dallas Press Club Award and he received an Emmy Award for his coverage of a skyjacking while working in Denver. He also received two National Headliner Awards. In 1980 he became an anchor and correspondent for WCBS-TV in New York, where he earned a second Emmy Award. He earned a Master of the Arts degree in broadcast journalism in 1973 from Boston University and a master's degree in public administration from the John F. Kennedy School of Government at Harvard University in 1995. For his work in entertainment television he was nominated for two Primetime Emmy Awards.

Year	Association	Category	Project	Result	Ref.
2008	National Academy of Television Arts and Sciences	Governor's Award		Received	
2014	Primetime Emmy Awards	Outstanding Television Movie	Killing Kennedy	Nominated	
2015	Primetime Emmy Awards	Outstanding Television Movie	Killing Reagan	Nominated	

== Political views and media coverage ==
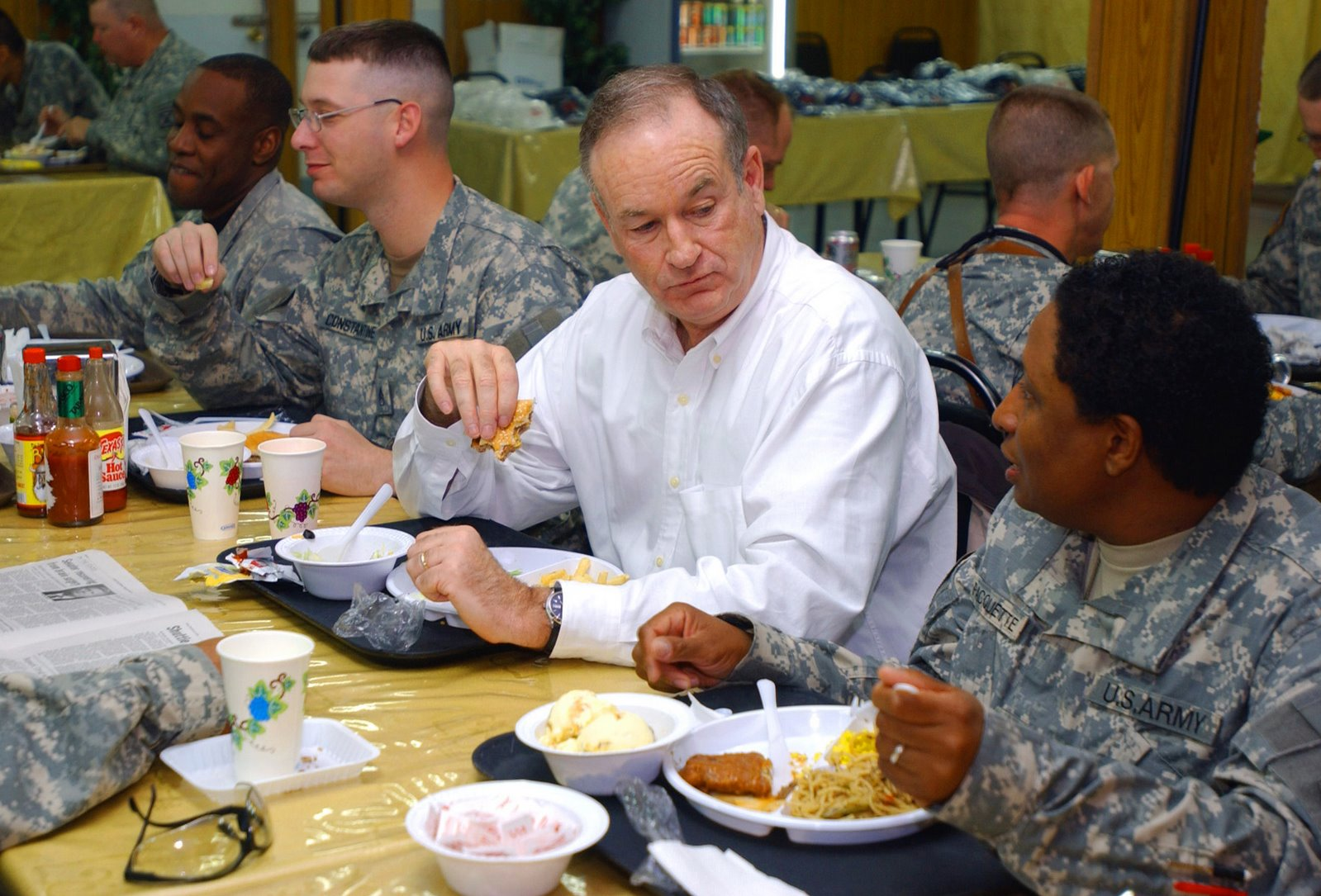
O'Reilly at Camp Striker, 2006

On The O'Reilly Factor and on his former talk-radio program, O'Reilly focused on news and commentary related to politics and culture. O'Reilly has long said that he does not identify with any political ideology, writing in his book The O'Reilly Factor that the reader "might be wondering whether I'm conservative, liberal, libertarian, or exactly what ... See, I don't want to fit any of those labels, because I believe that the truth doesn't have labels. When I see corruption, I try to expose it. When I see exploitation, I try to fight it. That's my political position." On December 6, 2000, the Daily News in New York reported, however, that he had been registered with the Republican Party in the state of New York since 1994. When questioned about this, he said that he was not aware of it and says he registered as an independent after the interview. During a broadcast of The Radio Factor, O'Reilly said that there was no option to register as an independent voter; however, there was in fact a box marked "I do not wish to enroll in party." Despite his remarks, many view him as a conservative figure. A February 2009 Pew Research poll found that 66% of his television viewers identify themselves as conservative, 24% moderate, and 3% liberal. A November 2008 poll by Zogby International found that O'Reilly was the second most trusted news personality, after Rush Limbaugh.

In a 2003 interview with Terry Gross on National Public Radio, O'Reilly said:

I'm not a political guy in the sense that I embrace an ideology. To this day I'm an independent thinker, an independent voter, I'm a registered independent ... [T]here are certain fundamental things that this country was founded upon that I respect and don't want changed. That separates me from the secularists who want a complete overhaul of how the country is run.

On a September 2007 edition of The Radio Factor, while having a discussion about race with fellow Fox News commentator and author Juan Williams about a meal he shared with Al Sharpton, O'Reilly said "You know when Sharpton and I walked in, it was like... big commotion and everything. But everybody was very nice. And I couldn't get over the fact that there was no difference between Sylvia's Restaurant and any other restaurant in New York City. I mean, it was exactly the same, even though it's run by blacks, primarily black patronship." He commented that no one in Sylvia's was "screaming 'M'Fer, I want more iced tea.'" He further added, "I think that black Americans are starting to think more and more for themselves, getting away from the Sharptons and the Jacksons and people trying to lead them into a race-based culture. They're just trying to figure it out. 'Look, I can make it. If I work hard and get educated, I can make it.'" The statement drew criticism. Roland S. Martin of CNN said that the notion that black people are just now starting to value education is "ridiculous" and that the notion that black people let Sharpton or Jackson think for them is "nuts". Media Matters for America covered the story on a number of occasions. O'Reilly responded, saying, "It was an attempt to tell the radio audience that there is no difference—black, white, we're all Americans. The stereotypes they see on television are not true" and also criticized Media Matters, stating that "Media Matters distorted the entire conversation and implied I was racist for condemning racism." Juan Williams said the criticism of O'Reilly was "rank dishonesty" and that the original comments "had nothing to do with racist ranting by anybody except by these idiots at CNN." Williams went on to say it was "frustrating" that the media try to criticize anyone who wanted to have an honest discussion about race.

In July 2016, Michelle Obama spoke of what it was like to live "in a house that was built by slaves" in reference to her time in the White House, with O'Reilly responding the slaves "were well-fed and had decent lodgings". Following criticism he defended his comment by stating that the nation's first president provided slaves with "meat, bread and other staples".

O'Reilly has long said that his inspiration for speaking up for average Americans is his working-class roots. He has pointed to his boyhood home in Levittown, New York, as a credential. In an interview with The Washington Post, O'Reilly's mother said that her family lived in Westbury, which is a few miles from Levittown. Citing this interview, then liberal talk-show pundit Al Franken accused O'Reilly of distorting his background to create a more working-class image. O'Reilly countered that The Washington Post misquoted his mother and that his mother still lives in his childhood home which was built by William Levitt. O'Reilly placed a copy of the house's mortgage on his website; the mortgage shows a Levittown postal address. O'Reilly has also said, "You don't come from any lower than I came from on an economic scale" and that his father, a currency accountant for an oil company, "never earned more than $35,000 a year in his life". O'Reilly responded that his father's $35,000 income only came at the end of his long career.

He was the main inspiration for comedian Stephen Colbert's satirical character on the Comedy Central show The Colbert Report, which featured Colbert in a "full-dress parody" of The Factor. On the show, Colbert referred to him as "Papa Bear". He and Colbert exchanged appearances on each other's shows in January 2007.

On May 10, 2008, he was presented with the National Academy of Television Arts and Sciences Governors' Award at an Emmy awards show dinner.

== Disputed claims ==
=== George de Mohrenschildt claim ===
In his bestselling 2013 book Killing Kennedy and on Fox and Friends, O'Reilly said he was knocking at the front door of George de Mohrenschildt's daughter's home at the moment Mohrenschildt committed suicide and that he heard the shotgun blast:

In March of 1977, a young television reporter at WFAA in Dallas began looking into the Kennedy assassination. As part of his reporting, he sought an interview with the shadowy Russian professor who had befriended the Oswalds upon their arrival in Dallas in 1962. The reporter traced George de Mohrenschildt to Palm Beach, Florida and traveled there to confront him. At the time de Mohrenschildt had been called to testify before a congressional committee looking into the events of November 1963. As the reporter knocked on the door of de Mohrenschildt's daughter's home, he heard the shotgun blast that marked the suicide of the Russian, assuring that his relationship with Lee Harvey Oswald would never be fully understood. By the way, that reporter's name is Bill O'Reilly.

It has been reported that this claim was disproven by Jefferson Morley, former editor of The Washington Post, who cited audio recordings made by Gaeton Fonzi indicating O'Reilly was not present in Florida on the day of Mohrenschildt's suicide.

=== War coverage claims ===
On February 19, 2015, David Corn from Mother Jones broke a story reporting a collection of inconsistencies of O'Reilly when recalling his experience covering the 1982 Falklands War. On April 17, 2013, O'Reilly said on his show: "I was in a situation one time, in a war zone in Argentina, in the Falklands, (...)". In his book, The No Spin Zone, he wrote: "You know that I am not easily shocked. I've reported on the ground in active war zones from El Salvador to the Falklands." On a 2004 column on his website he wrote: "Having survived a combat situation in Argentina during the Falklands war, I know that life-and-death decisions are made in a flash." Corn alleged that O'Reilly was not in the Falklands, but was in Buenos Aires, and that no American journalist was in the Islands during the conflict. Corn also said that according to O'Reilly's own book, The No Spin Zone, he arrived in Buenos Aires soon before the war ended.

On February 20, 2015, O'Reilly said on his show, "David Corn, a liar, says that I exaggerated situations in the Falklands War" and that he never said he was on the Falkland Islands. O'Reilly went on to describe his experience in a riot in Buenos Aires the day Argentina surrendered. Corn replied that he did not claim O'Reilly "exaggerated", but rather that there were contradictions between his accounts and the factual record, and that the 2013 clip from his show proves O'Reilly did in fact say he was on the Falklands. Corn told The New York Times: "The question is whether Bill O'Reilly was stating the truth when he repeatedly said that Argentine soldiers used real bullets and fired into the crowd of civilians and many were killed."

In September 2009 during an interview he said he covered the riots in Buenos Aires on the day Argentina surrendered.

During an interview with TheBlaze television network, O'Reilly said: "And if that moron [Corn] doesn't think it was a war zone in Buenos Aires, then he's even dumber than I think he is." This characterization by O'Reilly was disputed by former CBS colleague Eric Engberg who was in Buenos Aires at the time and challenged his (O'Reilly's) description of the riot as a "combat situation". Engberg went on to say it was a moderate riot and he heard no "shots fired" and saw no "ambulances or tanks" in the streets. The following week O'Reilly contradicted Engberg's claims, presenting archived CBS video of the riot that ensued after Argentine's surrender. The video appears to show riot police firing tear gas and plastic bullets toward the crowd; additionally, former NBC bureau chief Don Browne referred to the riot as an "intense situation" with many people hurt and tanks in the streets of Buenos Aires.

The fallout from the coverage generated by the questioning of O'Reilly's reporting during the Falklands War led to questions of claims made by O'Reilly while in El Salvador and Northern Ireland. In his 2013 book, Keep it Pithy, O'Reilly wrote: "I've seen soldiers gun down unarmed civilians in Latin America, Irish terrorists kill and maim their fellow citizens in Belfast with bombs." In a 2005 radio program O'Reilly said he had "seen guys gun down nuns in El Salvador". In 2012 on The O'Reilly Factor, he expanded, saying "I saw nuns get shot in the back of the head." O'Reilly and Fox News clarified that he had not been an eyewitness to any of those events but had just seen photographs of the murdered nuns and Irish bombings.

=== Malaysian income claims ===
In the midst of Chinese President Xi Jinping's trips to three Southeast Asian countries in April 2025, O'Reilly mocked Malaysia on his show as an irrelevant trading partner of China because they "have no money", prompting a harsh response from Malaysian Prime Minister Anwar Ibrahim who labeled the conservative commentator's remarks as "arrogant and ignorant" and exposing his "narrow worldview shaped by racial bias and colonialist ideology." O'Reilly further fueled controversy through his responses to Ibrahim, claiming Malaysia's per capita annual income of US$5,731 is below that of the United States, which is US$42,220, suggesting that Malaysians cannot buy "a little hat" or have a "Chinese takeout". Malaysian netizens condemned his remarks, citing social benefits that exist in Malaysia and not being enjoyed by average Americans, like free healthcare, safer school environment, and the fact that Malaysians can eat 24 hours a day. Dr. Ahmed Razman Abdul Latiff, economic analyst from Putra Business School, opined that O'Reilly's remarks not only reflected his economic illiteracy but also verged on his arrogance, "coming from the perception that the US will always remain the top economic superpower." He cited World Bank reports that predicted Asia–Pacific would experience stronger economic growth than the rest of the world.

== Legal issues ==
On October 13, 2004, O'Reilly sued Andrea Mackris, a former producer for The O'Reilly Factor, alleging extortion. O'Reilly claimed that Mackris had threatened a lawsuit unless he paid her more than $60 million. Later the same day, Mackris sued O'Reilly for sexual harassment, seeking $60 million in damages. Her complaint alleged that O'Reilly called her engaging in a crude phone conversation. On October 28, 2004, O'Reilly and Mackris reached an out-of-court settlement in which Mackris dropped her sexual-assault suit against O'Reilly and O'Reilly dropped his extortion claim against Mackris. The terms of the agreement are confidential, but in 2017 The New York Times reported that O'Reilly had agreed to pay Mackris about $9 million and that they would issue a public statement that there had been "no wrongdoing whatsoever".

After Fox News executive Roger Ailes was the subject of a sexual harassment lawsuit filed by former Fox News coworker Gretchen Carlson, O'Reilly said in July 2016, that Ailes was a "target" as a "famous, powerful or wealthy person" and called him the "best boss I ever had". After Ailes was fired and the network settled the lawsuit with Carlson, O'Reilly declined to comment further, saying that "for once in my life, I'm going to keep my big mouth shut."

Shortly after Ailes was fired, Fox News settled a sexual harassment claim against O'Reilly with former Fox host Juliet Huddy. Huddy alleged that O'Reilly pursued a romantic relationship with her and made lewd remarks. Legal fees in this case were settled and paid for by Fox News. The settlement was worth $1.6 million. In August 2016 former Fox host Andrea Tantaros filed a sexual harassment lawsuit against Fox News, claiming that O'Reilly made sexually suggestive comments to her. Judge George B. Daniels dismissed the lawsuit in May 2018 and wrote that Tantaros' allegations were "primarily based on speculation and conjecture".

The New York Times reported in April 2017 that O'Reilly and Fox News had settled five lawsuits against O'Reilly dating back to 2002. Previously, only the settlements to Mackris and Huddy were publicly reported; The Times reported that Fox hosts Rebecca Diamond and Laurie Dhue settled sexual harassment lawsuits in 2011 and 2016 respectively, and junior producer Rachel Witlieb Bernstein settled with Fox in 2002 after accusing O'Reilly of verbal abuse. The amount paid to the women filing the complaints was estimated at $13 million.

In October 2017, The New York Times reported that O'Reilly was also sued by former Fox News legal analyst Lis Wiehl for allegedly initiating a "non-consensual sexual relationship" with her. O'Reilly paid Wiehl $32 million to confidentially settle the lawsuit, and when the details of this settlement were leaked, O'Reilly was dropped by the United Talent Agency. His literary agent, WME, also announced that they would no longer represent him for future deals after the October report.

== Personal life ==
O'Reilly is Catholic. He was married to Maureen E. McPhilmy, a public relations executive. The couple met in 1992, and their wedding took place in St. Brigid Parish of Westbury, New York, on November 2, 1996. O'Reilly and McPhilmy have a daughter Madeline (b. 1998) and a son Spencer (b. 2003).

The couple separated on April 2, 2010, and were divorced on September 1, 2011.

In May 2015, court transcripts from O'Reilly's custody trial with ex-wife Maureen McPhilmy revealed an allegation of domestic violence. Following this allegation, O'Reilly issued a statement through his attorney describing the account as "100% false" and declined to comment further in order "to respect the court-mandated confidentiality put in place to protect [his] children". In February 2016, O'Reilly lost a bid for sole custody of both of his children.

== Published works ==
O'Reilly has authored or co-authored a number of books:

- O'Reilly, Bill (1998). Those Who Trespass. Bancroft Press. ISBN 0-9631246-8-4.
- O'Reilly, Bill (2000). The O'Reilly Factor: The Good, the Bad, and the Completely Ridiculous in American Life. Broadway Books. ISBN 0-7679-0528-8. (Reached No. 1 on the New York Times' Non-Fiction Best Seller list.)
- O'Reilly, Bill (2001). The No Spin Zone. Broadway Books. ISBN 0-7679-0848-1. (Reached No. 1 on the New York Times' Non-Fiction Best Seller list.)
- O'Reilly, Bill (2003). Who's Looking Out For You?. Broadway Books. ISBN 0-7679-1379-5. (Reached No. 1 on the New York Times' Non-Fiction Best Seller list.)
- O'Reilly, Bill; Charles Flowers (2004). The O'Reilly Factor For Kids: A Survival Guide for America's Families. Harper Entertainment. ISBN 0-06-054424-4. (Best-selling nonfiction children's book of 2005)
- O'Reilly, Bill (2006). Culture Warrior. Broadway Books. ISBN 0-7679-2092-9. (Reached No. 1 on the New York Times' Non-Fiction Best Seller list; Achieved more than one million copies in print in its first three months)
- O'Reilly, Bill (2007). Kids Are Americans Too. William Morrow. ISBN 978-0-06-084676-3.
- O'Reilly, Bill (2008). A Bold Fresh Piece of Humanity: A Memoir. Broadway Books. ISBN 978-0-7679-2882-3.
- O'Reilly, Bill (2010). Pinheads and Patriots: Where You Stand in the Age of Obama. William Morrow. ISBN 978-0-06-195071-1.
- O'Reilly, Bill (2011). Factor Words: A Collection of the O'Reilly Factor Favorite "Words of the Day". A Bill Me Inc. ISBN 978-1450789783.
- O'Reilly, Bill; Martin Dugard (2011). Killing Lincoln: The Shocking Assassination that Changed America Forever. Henry Holt and Co. ISBN 978-0-8050-9307-0.
- O'Reilly, Bill; Dwight Jon Zimmerman (2012). Lincoln's Last Days: The Shocking Assassination that Changed America Forever. New York: Henry Holt and Co. ISBN 978-0-8050-9675-0.
- O'Reilly, Bill; Martin Dugard (2012). Killing Kennedy: The End of Camelot. Henry Holt and Co. ISBN 978-0-8050-9666-8.
- O'Reilly, Bill (2013). Kennedy's Last Days: The Assassination That Defined a Generation. Henry Holt and Co. ISBN 978-0-8050-9802-0.
- O'Reilly, Bill (2013). Keep It Pithy: Useful Observations in a Tough World. Crown Archetype. ISBN 978-0-385-34662-7.
- O'Reilly, Bill; Martin Dugard (2013). Killing Jesus: A History. Henry Holt and Co. ISBN 978-0-8050-9854-9.
- O'Reilly, Bill (2014). The Last Days of Jesus: His Life and Times. Henry Holt and Co. ISBN 978-0-8050-9877-8.
- O'Reilly, Bill; Martin Dugard (2014). Killing Patton: The Strange Death of World War II's Most Audacious General. Henry Holt and Co. ISBN 978-0-8050-9668-2.
- O'Reilly, Bill; David Fisher (2015). Bill O'Reilly's Legends and Lies: The Real West. Henry Holt and Co.
- O'Reilly, Bill (2015). Hitler's Last Days: The Death of the Nazi Regime and the World's Most Notorious Dictator. Henry Holt and Co. ISBN 978-1-62779-396-4.
- O'Reilly, Bill; Martin Dugard (2015). Killing Reagan: The Violent Assault That Changed a Presidency. Henry Holt and Co. ISBN 9781627792417.
- O'Reilly, Bill (2016). The Day the President Was Shot. Henry Holt and Co. ISBN 978-1-62779-699-6.
- O'Reilly, Bill; Martin Dugard (2016). Killing the Rising Sun: How America Vanquished World War II Japan. Henry Holt and Co. ISBN 978-1-6277-9062-8.
- O'Reilly, Bill; James Patterson (2016). Give Please a Chance. Jimmy Patterson. ISBN 978-0316276887.
- O'Reilly, Bill; Bruce Feirstein (2017). Old School: Life in the Sane Lane. Henry Holt and Co. ISBN 978-1-2501-3579-7.
- O'Reilly, Bill; Martin Dugard (2017). Killing England: The Brutal Struggle for American Independence. Henry Holt and Co. ISBN 978-1-6277-9064-2.
- O'Reilly, Bill; Martin Dugard (2018). Killing the SS: The Hunt for the Worst War Criminals in History. Henry Holt and Co. ISBN 978-1-2501-6554-1.
- O'Reilly, Bill (2019). The United States of Trump: How the President Really Sees America. Thorndike Press. ISBN 978-1-4328-6935-9
- O'Reilly, Bill; Martin Dugard (2020). Killing Crazy Horse: The Merciless Indian Wars in America. Henry Holt and Co. ISBN 9781627797047.
- O'Reilly, Bill; Martin Dugard (2021). Killing the Mob: The Fight Against Organized Crime in America. St. Martin's Press. ISBN 9781250273659.
- O'Reilly, Bill; Martin Dugard (2022). Killing the Killers: The Secret War Against Terrorists. St. Martin's Press. ISBN 9781250279255.
- O'Reilly, Bill; Martin Dugard (2022). Killing the Legends: The Lethal Danger of Celebrity. St. Martin's Press. ISBN 9781250283306.
- O'Reilly, Bill; Martin Dugard (2023). Killing the Witches: The Horror of Salem, Massachusetts.
- O'Reilly, Bill; Martin Dugard (2024). Confronting the Presidents: No Spin Assessments from Washington to Biden. St. Martin's Press. ISBN 9781250346414.

== See also ==
- New Yorkers in journalism
