= The Girl on the Train =

The Girl on the Train may refer to:

- The Girl on the Train (novel), a 2015 novel by Paula Hawkins
  - The Girl on the Train (2016 film), an American film based on the novel
  - The Girl on the Train (2021 film), an Indian film, remake of the US 2016 film
- The Girl on the Train (2009 film), a French drama film
- The Girl on the Train (2013 film), an American independent film

== See also ==
- The Girl in the Train, 1910 English adaptation of the operetta Die geschiedene Frau
- The Girl in the Pullman, a 1927 silent American film
