= Simone Campos =

Brazilian writer and translator

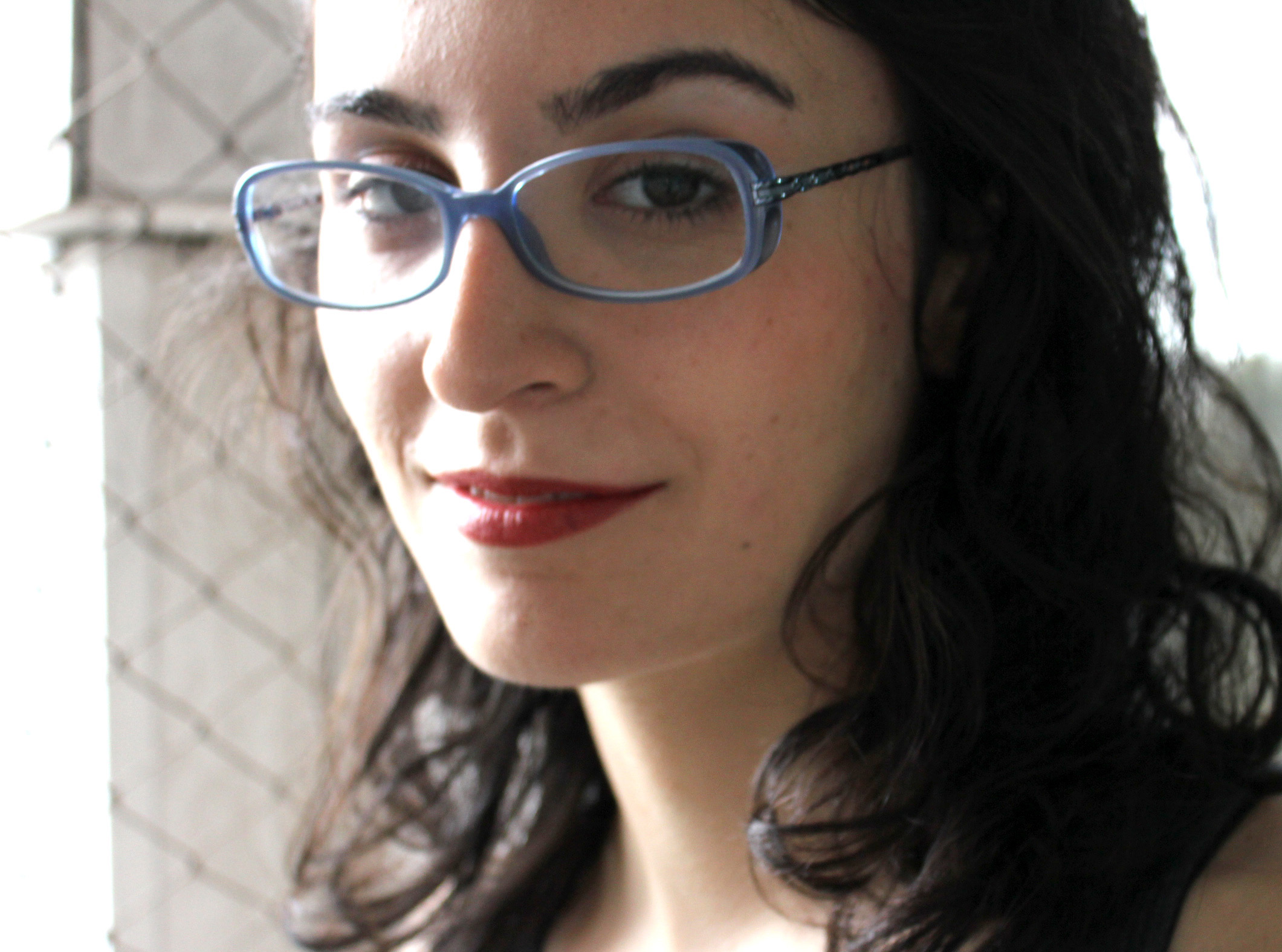
- Occupation: Writer, translator
- Website: www.simonecampos.net

Simone Campos (born 20 February 1983 in Rio de Janeiro) is a Brazilian writer and translator.

== Life and career ==
Campos debuted in writing at age 17, with the book No Shopping (2000). She graduated in journalism and editing at Federal University of Rio de Janeiro and has a master's degree and a doctorate in literary theory at Rio de Janeiro State University.

She published her second book, A feia noite in 2006, and the online science fiction novel Penados y Rebeldes. She received the Petrobras scholarship for Literary Creation in 2007, with which she published the book of short stories Amostragem Complexa. In 2013, she published the gamebook OWNED - Um Novo jogador, in online and physical versions, also financed by the Petrobras grant.

She also wrote the novels A vez de morrer (2014), Nada vai acontecer com você [Nothing can hurt you now] (2021) and Mulher de pouca fé (2025).

Campos translated to Portuguese, among other books, Paula Hawkins' The Girl in the Train, Margaret Atwood's The Testaments, and The Secret History of Twin Peaks, by Mark Frost (with Stephanie Fernandes).

In a 2021 interview, Campos announced that she was autistic.
