= Paula Hawkins =

Paula Hawkins may refer to:

- Paula Hawkins (author) (born 1972), British novelist
- Paula Hawkins (politician) (1927–2009), US senator from Florida
