= The Girl on the Train (2021 film) =

2021 Indian film by Ribhu Dasgupta

- Official release poster
- Directed by: Ribhu Dasgupta
- Screenplay by: Erin Cressida Wilson; Ribhu Dasgupta; Viddesh Malandkar
- Story by: Adapted: Ribhu Dasgupta; Original: Paula Hawkins
- Based on: The Girl on the Train by Paula Hawkins
- Produced by: Vivek Agrawal; Shibashish Sarkar
- Starring: Parineeti Chopra; Aditi Rao Hydari; Kirti Kulhari; Avinash Tiwary
- Cinematography: Tribhuvan Babu Sadineni
- Edited by: Sangeeth Varghese
- Music by: Songs: Sunny and Inder Bawra; Vipin Patwa; Background Score: Gilad Benamram
- Production company: Reliance Entertainment
- Distributed by: Netflix
- Release date: 26 February 2021
- Running time: 120 minutes
- Country: India
- Language: Hindi

The Girl on the Train is a 2021 Indian Hindi-language mystery thriller film directed by Ribhu Dasgupta and produced by Reliance Entertainment, based on British author Paula Hawkins's 2015 debut novel of the same name. The film stars Parineeti Chopra, Avinash Tiwary, Aditi Rao Hydari and Kirti Kulhari and was released worldwide on 26 February 2021 on Netflix. The film revolves around Mira Kapoor (Parineeti Chopra), an alcoholic and troubled divorcee who gets embroiled in a big murder investigation.

== Plot ==
Nusrat is chased by someone in a forest and Mira is standing at the train station. In a flashback it is shown that Mira met Shekhar at a wedding where they fell in love. They both get married and Mira is pregnant. Mira is fighting a case against Jimmy Bagga where she successfully wins and Jimmy goes to jail. A few months later she is hit by a car and has amnesia caused by the car accident. She has become an alcoholic, and has separated from Shekhar who re-married to Anjali.

Obsessed with a seemingly perfect couple she sees from the train window on her commute to London, one drunken night Mira follows the young woman into the forest but doesn't recall what happens next.

The police have a decent amount of circumstantial evidence against her and even move to make an arrest but Mira escapes out the window and calls for a favour from the family member of a former client, and asking him to get her a phone, some cash, and a gun.

Mira discovers that the missing girl Nusrat wasn't as happily married as she seemed and that she was having an affair. She theorizes that Mira is her killer – in a drunken rage which she accidentally records on her phone, Mira fantasises about smashing Nusrat's head in, angry that she is ruining her own marriage.

Other suspects include, Nusrat's dance teacher, a blackmailing private investigator, and more than one aggressive and abusive husband.

It's eventually revealed that Mira's philandering ex-husband Shekhar has been gaslighting her for years. She's a blackout drunk but she isn't the violent, offensive brute that he's been claiming, and she isn't responsible for him losing his job. Though Nusrat was unhappy in her marriage to abusive Anand and was pregnant by someone else, Anand didn't kill her. Nor did the kindly therapist who was trying to help Nusrat. It turns out the Nusrat was impregnated by Shekhar, and the night Mira followed Nusrat into “Greenwich Forest” Shekhar was there too and it was him who bashed Mira over the head with a rock and left her there. Nusrat told him of her pregnancy, they fought, and Shekhar strangled Nusrat, leaving her for dead.

However she survived the attempt. It turns out there were two other people in Greenwich Forest that night. These are the police woman in charge of the case, Inspector Dalbir, and a private detective named Walter, who was hired by Anand to follow Nusrat.

Walter's pictures from the night reveal that, in fact, Dalbir killed Nusrat. Dalbir is the daughter of organized crime boss Jimmy Bagga whom Mira had sent to prison where he killed himself. It was she who crashed the jeep into Mira and Shekhar, causing Mira to lose her baby and get amnesia. Dalbir later mows down and kills Walter.

Dalbir had been tailing Mira for a time, and followed her into the forest. Finding her unconscious having been hit by Shekhar, Dalbir saw an opportunity to murder her in revenge. But Nusrat, who had just woken up, caught Dalbir trying to off Mira. Dalbir could't leave a witness, so instead she decided to kill Nusrat and frame Mira for the murder.

Following the trail to Walter's house, Mira solves the crime, and when Dalbir turns up to kill her and destroy the evidence, a fight ensues and Mira ends up shooting Dalbir. Mira decides to get sober and move on with her life.

== Cast ==
- Parineeti Chopra as Mira Kapoor
- Aditi Rao Hydari as Nusrat John Joshi
- Kirti Kulhari as Inspector Dalbir Kaur Bagga
- Avinash Tiwary as Dr. Shekhar Kapoor, Mira's ex-husband
- Tota Roy Chowdhury as Dr. Hamid, the psychiatrist
- Suresh Sippy as Mira's Doctor
- Nisha Aaliya as Piya, Mira's friend
- Sharik Khan as Wasim, Piya's friend
- Diljohn Singh as Rajiv
- Shamaun Ahmed as Anand Joshi, Nusrat's husband
- Monisha Hassen as Zehra, Shekhar's boss

== Production ==
The film was announced on 24 April 2019. In May 2019 it was revealed that first schedule will be in England. Kirti Kulhari was roped in to play a British cop.

Principal photography began in early August 2019 in London. Railway scenes were shot on location on the Mid-Norfolk Railway.

== Release ==
The Girl on the Train was scheduled for theatrical release on 8 May 2020. The release was delayed due to COVID-19 pandemic in India. The film was released on 26 February 2021 on Netflix.

== Soundtrack ==
The Girl on the Train

Soundtrack album by Sunny and Inder Bawra and Vipin Patwa
- Released: 9 February 2021
- Genre: Feature film soundtrack
- Length: 17:00
- Language: Hindi
- Label: Zee Music Company

Official audio
- The Girl on the Train - Full Album on YouTube

The film's music was composed by Sunny and Inder Bawra and Vipin Patwa while lyrics written by Kumaar.

Track listing
No.	Title	Music	Singer(s)	Length
1.	"Chhal Gaya Chhalaa"	Sunny and Inder Bawra	Sukhwinder Singh	4:10
2.	"Matlabi Yariyan"	Vipin Patwa	Neha Kakkar	4:06
3.	"Mahi Mera Ranjha"	Sunny and Inder Bawra	Navraj Hans, Jonita Gandhi	4:14
4.	"Matlabi Yariyan" (Unplugged)	Vipin Patwa	Parineeti Chopra	4:30
Total length:				17:00

== Reception ==
The film received mixed reviews from critics.

On the review aggregator website Rotten Tomatoes, 9% of 11 critics' reviews are positive, with an average rating of 3.9/10.

Umesh Punwani of Koimoi rated it 3.5 out of 5 stars, calling it "A Mysterious Journey With No Stops Led By A Deadly Kohl-Eyed Parineeti Chopra!". Bollywood Hungama rated it 2.5/5 stars saying, "The Girl On the Train is an average fare". Saibal Chatterjee of NDTV gave it 1.5 out of 5 stars. Anna M. M. Vetticad of Firstpost rated it 2 out of 5 praising Parineeti Chopra's sincere performance and saying rest of the cast a mixed bag. The Times of India rated the film 3 stars out of 5 praising Chopra's and Kulhari's performances

== Accolades ==
Year	Award	Category	Nominee(s)	Result	Ref.
67th Filmfare Awards	30 August 2022	Best Supporting Actress	Kirti Kulhari	Nominated	
67th Filmfare Awards	30 August 2022	Best Playback Singer (female)	Neha Kakkar	Nominated	
