= Into the Water =

2017 novel by Paula Hawkins

- First UK edition
- Author: Paula Hawkins
- Language: English
- Published: 05/02/2017
- Publisher: Doubleday (UK); Riverhead Books (US)
- Publication place: United Kingdom
- Media type: Print (Hardback)
- Pages: 368 (UK); 400 (US)
- ISBN: 9780735211209

Into the Water (2017) is a thriller novel by British author Paula Hawkins. It is Hawkins' second full-length thriller following the success of The Girl on the Train.

Although the novel performed well, becoming a Sunday Times best seller and featuring on The New York Times Fiction Best Sellers of 2017, critical reception was generally not as positive as it had been for her debut thriller. Several critics were confused by the plethora of characters (the story is told from the viewpoint of 11 characters) and the similarities of their voices.

In February 2017, before the book was first published, Variety reported that DreamWorks' parent Amblin Partners purchased the film rights, with La La Land's Marc Platt and Jared LeBoff proposed as producers.

== Plot ==
Following the unexplained death of her sister, Nel, in a pool at the foot of a cliff, Jules Abbott returns to Beckford, a fictional town in Northumberland, to care for her niece, Lena. The novel is told in a mixture of first-person and third-person narrative.

Jules had been estranged from her sister Nel due to an incident from their childhood. Nel assumed that Jules had seduced her boyfriend Robbie even though he was sexually abusing Jules. Lena is furious at Jules for not speaking to her mum. Lena believes that her mum jumped into the Drowning Pool, a place where multiple women throughout the town's history have died. Lena blamed her friend Katie's death on her mother's obsession with the pool. Jules does not believe that her sister committed suicide. She heard fear in Nel's last voicemail, imploring Jules to meet her. Jules informed Detective Sean Townsend about this. Detective Sergeant Erin Morgan sensed Sean's distress in the case and found out that his mother also committed suicide in the Drowning Pool.

Helen Townsend stays at her father-in-law Patrick's cottage as her husband betrayed her. Louise, Katie's mother, was relieved that Nel died as she holds her responsible for inspiring girls to become curious about the Drowning Pool. Her son Josh, however, is terrified that his mother was not at the house when Nel died.

Jules searches for her mother's bracelet which Nel wore all the time and is shocked to find that it is missing. Louise finds diet pills prescribed to Nel among Katie's belongings and tells Sean that Nel's murder should be made public. But it turns out that Katie asked Lena to buy her the pills.

Mark Henderson, Lena's teacher, finds Nel's bracelet in Helen's drawer while searching her room. Josh and Lena break his windows as revenge for Katie's death. Josh tells Sean that Mark seduced Katie, and Lena reveals that Katie sacrificed herself to protect Mark from being arrested for unlawful intercourse. Louise confronts Lena for keeping the information from her, and Lena tells her she threatened Katie to end her relationship with Mark. After Louise leaves, she tells Jules that it was Nel who made the threat.

Erin learns that Nel and Sean had a relationship. She asks Sean about it and he barks at her to check his records. She meets Nickie, a con artist who tells her that she must look upon Lauren (Patrick's dead wife) and not Helen.

Lena waits for Mark at his home and tries to kill him but ends up injured. He ties her up and tries to escape with her in the car. He confronts her at his ex's cottage and tells Lena that he loved Katie and did not kill Nel. They fight, and Lena likely kills Mark.

Lena tells Jules that Nel was murdered, having learned from Mark that Helen Townsend had a bracelet in her office that was missing from Nel's body after her death. Jules goes to the Townsend house and accuses Helen of murdering Nel. Patrick (Sean's father) then confesses to killing Nel and to killing his own wife, Lauren, years ago.

In the months after Patrick’s confession, each of the characters leaves Beckford. Jules and Lena go to London and have a much stronger relationship than they did at the beginning. Patrick is in jail. Helen and Sean leave together, but Sean disappears one day and Helen does not look for him. Sean, in an undisclosed location, tries to come to terms with himself and admits that it was he who killed Nel.

== Reception ==
In contrast to the general acclaim Hawkins received for The Girl on the Train, Into the Water received mixed reviews. While acknowledging the challenges of writing for 11 separate narrative voices, crime novelist Val McDermid wrote in The Guardian that the similarity of the characters' tone and register makes it "almost impossible to tell [them] apart, which end up being monotonous and confusing"; furthermore, it doesn't reflect the speech patterns of Northumberland. McDermid concludes that the sales will be much higher than the readers' enjoyment.

Similarly, Independent's Sally Newall says that the voices weren't "distinct enough". She was "semi-gripped" by the novel, but found that the "myriad of characters" made it difficult to care about them or the final reveal. Writing in The New York Times, Janet Maslin wrote that Hawkins' "goal may be to build suspense, but all she achieves is confusion. Into the Water is jam-packed with minor characters and stories that go nowhere." The New Statesman's Leo Robson wrote "Most of the time, the novel is plausible and grimly gripping." He commended the writing as "addictive", and added that the novel "is on a par with The Girl on a Train". Jocelyn McClurg for USA Today also offers praise, suggesting "Hawkins, influenced by Hitchcock, has a cinematic eye and an ear for eerie, evocative language."

== Translations ==
In 2017 Ali Qane’ of the Tehran publisher Kuleh Poshty Publications stated that the company he works for received the right to translate the book in Iran after Qane’ requested the author's permission to do so via a telephone call; he stated that five employees of the company are translating different parts of the book.
