= Erin Cressida Wilson =

American dramatist

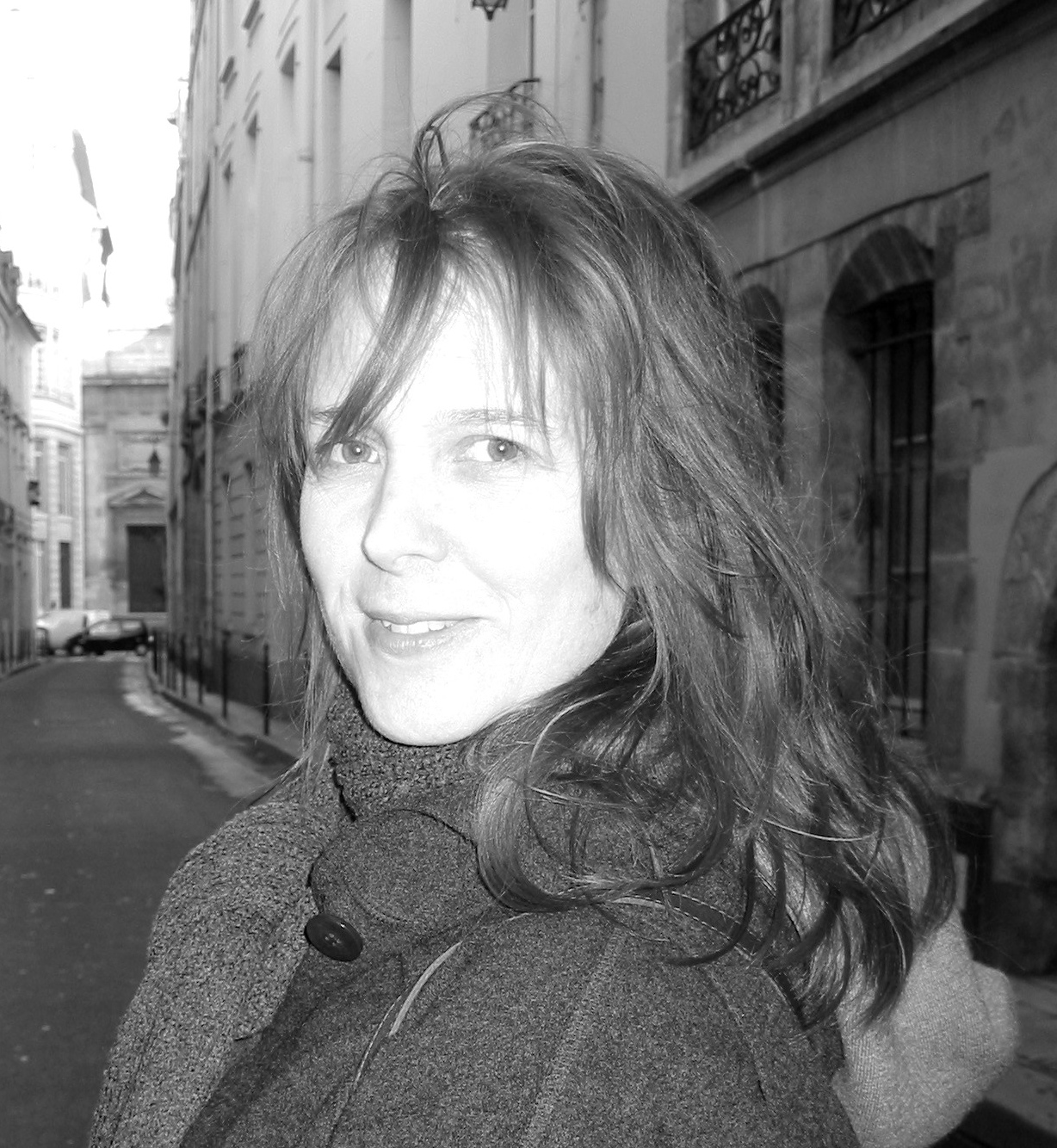
- Born: February 12, 1964 (age 62) San Francisco, California, U.S.
- Occupation: Playwright, screenwriter, author
- Years active: 2002–present
- Spouse: J. C. MacKenzie
- Children: 1

Erin Cressida Wilson (born February 12, 1964) is an American playwright, screenwriter, professor, and author.

Wilson is known for the 2002 film Secretary, which she adapted from a Mary Gaitskill short story. It won her the Independent Spirit Award for Best First Screenplay and received critical acclaim. She also wrote the screenplays for the 2006 film Fur: An Imaginary Portrait of Diane Arbus, starring Nicole Kidman; for the 2009 erotic thriller Chloe, directed by Atom Egoyan (remake of the 2003 French film Nathalie...); for the 2014 drama Men, Women & Children, co-written with its director Jason Reitman (from the novel by Chad Kultgen); and the 2016 mystery thriller The Girl on the Train, from the Paula Hawkins novel of the same name. The latter is her highest-grossing film to date. She was also a writer-producer on the HBO series Vinyl.

Wilson has also authored dozens of plays and short works. She has taught at Duke University, Brown University, and the University of California, Santa Barbara.

== Education ==
Wilson attended San Francisco University High School and studied Theatre at Smith College, a women's college in Northampton, Massachusetts.

== Credits as screenwriter ==
- Secretary (2002)
- Fur: An Imaginary Portrait of Diane Arbus (2006)
- Chloe (2009)
- Call Me Crazy: A Five Film (2013)
- Men, Women & Children (2014)
- The Girl on the Train (2016)
- Snow White (2025)
- Alone at Dawn (TBA)

== Plays ==
- When the Girls Come Out to Play (1985)
- Dakota's Belly, Wyoming (1986)
- Flying Hormones (1989)
- Rio Esmerelda (1989)
- Soiled Eyes of a Ghost (1989)
- Cross-Dressing in the Depression (1993)
- My Girl is in Front (1996)
- Hurricane (1998)
- The Erotica Project (1999)
- The Trail of Her Inner Thigh (1999)
- Stop All the Clocks (2002)
- Wilder (2003)
- Hands (2013)
