= Clare Corbett =

British actress

- Occupation: Actress
- Years active: 2001–present

Clare Corbett is a British actress and a winner (2000) of a Carleton Hobbs Radio Award. She studied at the Welsh College of Music and Drama and has appeared in television programmes such as Casualty, Eastenders and Doctors, as well as a number of radio plays (including Absolute Power, Venus and Adonis and Dr. Zhivago), and video games, including the Dark Souls series.

She has narrated numerous audiobooks including Vanessa and Her Sister, Shopaholic to the Stars, and The Girl on the Train, which won the 2016 Audie Award for Audiobook of the Year.

In 2017, Corbett was nominated for "Best Supporting Actor/Actress" in the BBC Audio Drama Awards for her role as Franciska Lazar in the drama serial Keeping the Wolf Out.

== Filmography ==
=== Film ===
| Year | Title | Role | Notes |
|---|---|---|---|
| 2001 | Raw | Lorna | |
| 2006 | Journeys Close to Home | Girl | Voice, short film |
| 2010 | Sookie & Finn: Our Day | Finn, Luke | Short film |
| 2016 | Wrong Way Forward | Myra | Short film |

=== Television ===
| Year | Title | Role | Notes |
|---|---|---|---|
| 2003 | 40 | Nurse | 1 episode |
| 2003 | Final Demand | Selena | Television film |
| 2003 | Sucked Up | Narrator | TV short |
| 2003, 2007 | Casualty | Midwife, Janie Jones | 2 episodes |
| 2004 | Spooks | Teacher | 1 episode |
| 2005 | The Bill | Hailey Brown | Episode: "Won't Take it Lying Down" |
| 2005–2007 | Planet Sketch | Various | 39 Episodes |
| 2007 | Doctors | Penny Ederer | Episode: "Broken" |
| 2010, 2011 | Chuggington | ChugNav | Voice role. 2 episodes |
| 2011 | EastEnders | Paramedic 1 | 1 episode |
| 2013 | Holby City | Naomi Court | Episode: "If I Needed Someone" |
| 2020 | Spitting Image | Prince George, Princess Charlotte, Anneliese Dodds | 3 episodes |
| 2021 | Emmerdale | Fire Investigator | 2 episodes |
| 2023 | The Hunt for Raoul Moat | Kath Rathband | 2 episodes |

=== Video games ===
| Year | Title | Role | Notes |
|---|---|---|---|
| 2004 | World of Warcraft | | |
| 2006 | Rule of Rose | Amanda | |
| 2009 | Demon's Souls | Saint Astraea | |
| 2011 | Dark Souls | Itinerant Merchant Woman, Gwynevere, Priscillia | |
| 2014 | Dark Souls II | Alsanna | Scholar of the First Sin DLC |
| 2014 | Lego the Hobbit: The Video Game | Additional Voices | |
| 2014 | LittleBigPlanet 3 | Hildur | |
| 2016 | Dark Souls III | Nestling, Evangelist | |
| 2017 | The Surge | | |
| 2017 | Total War: Warhammer II | | |
| 2017 | Lego Marvel Super Heroes 2 | | |
| 2017 | Xenoblade Chronicles 2 | Floren, Electra | |
| 2018 | Ni no Kuni II: Revenant Kingdom | | |
| 2018 | League of Angels III | | |
| 2018 | World of Warcraft: Battle for Azeroth | | |
| 2018 | Battlefield V | | |
| 2019 | GreedFall | Minor characters | |
| 2019 | Another Eden | Melina | |
| 2020 | Demon's Souls | Maiden Astraea, Hawk Girl, Disciple | |
| 2021 | It Takes Two | Rose | |
| 2021 | My Friend Peppa Pig | Danny Dog, George Pig, Molly Mole, Rebecca Rabbit | |
| 2022 | Elden Ring | Tarnished (Female), Irina, Hyetta, Aureliette | |
| 2022 | Warhammer 40,000: Darktide | The Agitator | |
| 2023 | Arknights | Estelle | |
| 2023 | Baldur's Gate 3 | Kagha, Us | |
| 2026 | Onimusha: Way of the Sword | Dokyo | |

== Audiobooks (partial list) ==
- Night Music (2009)
- I've Got Your Number (2012)
- Dying Fall: A Ruth Galloway Investigation (Book 5) (2013)
- The Outcast Dead: A Ruth Galloway Investigation (Book 6) (2014)
- Shopaholic to the Stars (2014)
- How to Get a (Love) Life (2014)
- The Girl on the Train (2015)
- The Ghost Fields: A Ruth Galloway Investigation (Book 7) (2015)
- Vanessa and Her Sister (2015)
- Demelza (Poldark Book 2) (2015)
- The Widow (2016)
- Revenger (2016)
- The Child (2017)
- Her Frozen Heart (2017)
- The Hunting Party (2018)
- The Rumour (2018)
- Doctor Who: The Good Doctor (2018)
- The Feed (2018)
- The Suspect (2019)
- Lanny (2019)
- Flights (2019)
- The Towers of Trebizond by Rose Macaulay (2024)
- Doctor Who: Space Babies by Alison Rumfitt (2024)
