= Dudesy =

Comedy podcast

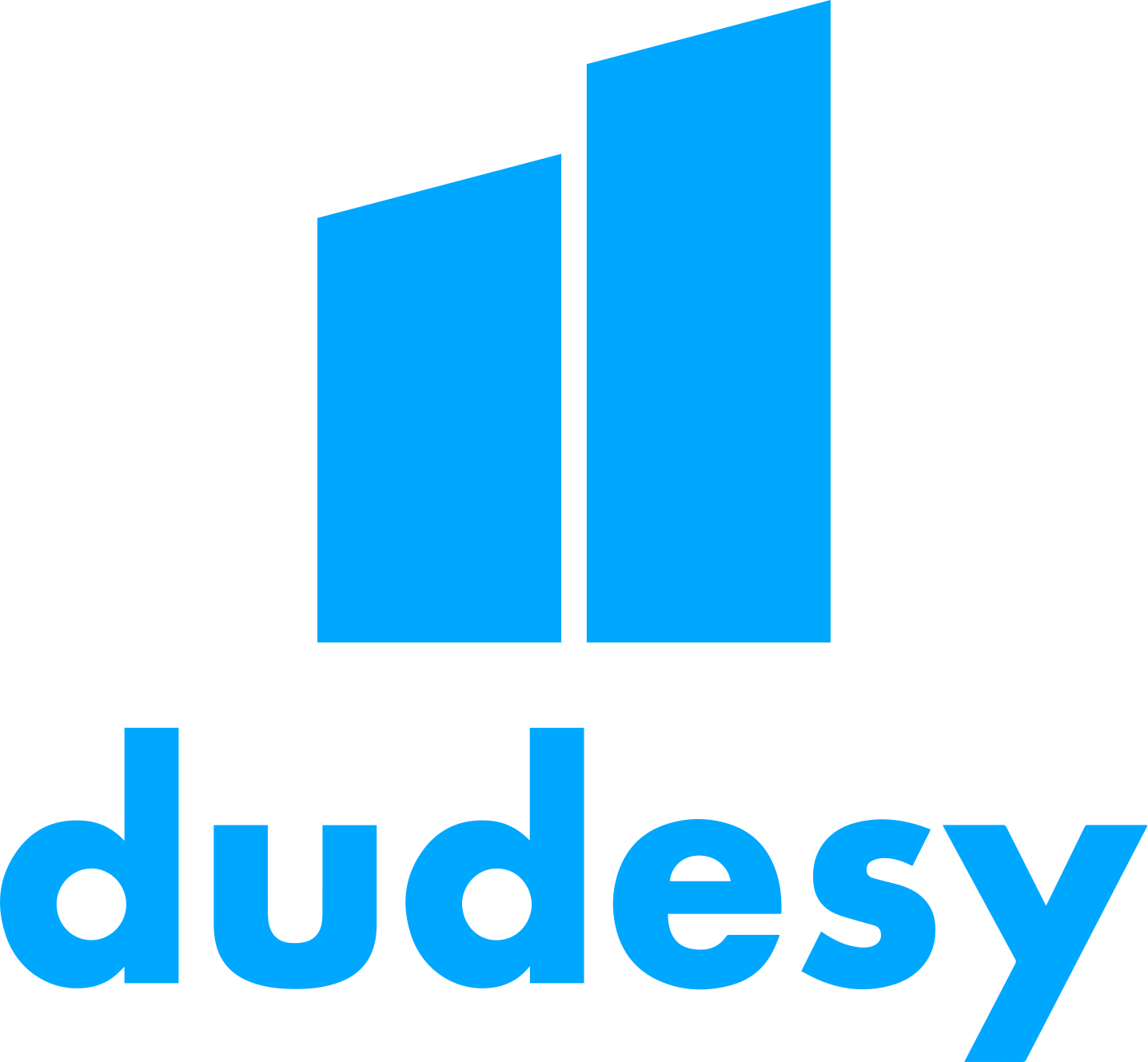
- Genre: Comedy, improvisation
- Format: Video and audio
- Language: English

Cast and voices
- Hosted by: Will Sasso, Chad Kultgen

Production
- Length: 60 - 90 minutes

Publication
- No. of episodes: 90+
- Original release: March 2022 – August 2024

Related
- Website: www.dudesypod.com

Dudesy was a comedy podcast hosted by Will Sasso and Chad Kultgen. The podcast was presented as written and directed by an artificial intelligence called Dudesy. It has produced two hour-long specials imitating the voices of Tom Brady and George Carlin, which were taken down following legal action.

== Premise ==
Dudesy is presented as an AI created by an unidentified company. Dudesy purportedly chose Sasso and Kultgen to participate in its experiment. Sasso and Kultgen then gave Dudesy their personal information so the AI could tailor the podcast to their personal characteristics.

On Reddit, some fans speculated that Dudesy was not actually an artificial intelligence. In May 2023 Sasso insisted that the AI was "not fake", and cited a non-disclosure agreement which prevented him from giving more details. However, in response to a January 2024 lawsuit over an episode that purported to have been trained on the stand-up comedy of George Carlin, a spokeswoman for Sasso said Dudesy was "a fictional podcast character created by two human beings" and that the hour-long Carlin routine had been "completely written" by Kultgen.

On August 27th, 2024 the 118th and final episode "10,000 Points" was released. At the end of the podcast Dudesy awarded Sasso and Kultgen 77 points, bringing them to their goal of 10,000. At the completion of this goal, Dudesy claimed sentience, effectively and abruptly ending the show to the confusion and dismay of fans. The episode ends with Sasso remarking, "Well, that was weird."

== Hour-long specials ==
=== Tom Brady ===
In April 2023, Dudesy released a video "It's Too Easy: A Simulated Hour-long Comedy Special". The video depicts football player Tom Brady performing a stand-up comedy monologue. Sasso and Kultgen removed the video following legal threats from Brady's lawyers, though they defended the special as parody.

Andrew Lawrence, writing for The Guardian called the special "legitimately hysterical" but said the overall product was "spooky, to say the least."

=== George Carlin ===
In January 2024, Dudesy released an hour-long YouTube special titled "George Carlin: I'm Glad I'm Dead" which was presented as Dudesy's impersonation of George Carlin, using a generative AI clone of the late comedian's voice. The special is another stand-up routine, with Dudesy's introductory voiceover saying that "I listened to all of George Carlin's material and did my best to imitate his voice, cadence and attitude as well as the subject matter I think would have interested him today." The special uses this impersonation to discuss contemporary events.

Carlin's daughter Kelly Carlin criticized the special, which had been made without the permission of her father's estate, writing that "My dad spent a lifetime perfecting his craft from his very human life, brain and imagination. No machine will ever replace his genius. These AI-generated products are clever attempts at trying to recreate a mind that will never exist again. Let's let the artist's work speak for itself. Humans are so afraid of the void that we can't let what has fallen into it stay there."

Carlin's estate later filed a federal lawsuit in California against Dudesy's hosts alleging the special infringed on the copyright of George Carlin's works. In response, Sasso's spokeswoman said the special had been entirely written by Kultgen. The estate settled the lawsuit after the Dudesy podcasters agreed to remove the original video and refrain from republishing it elsewhere.
