= Will Sasso =

Canadian actor (born 1975)

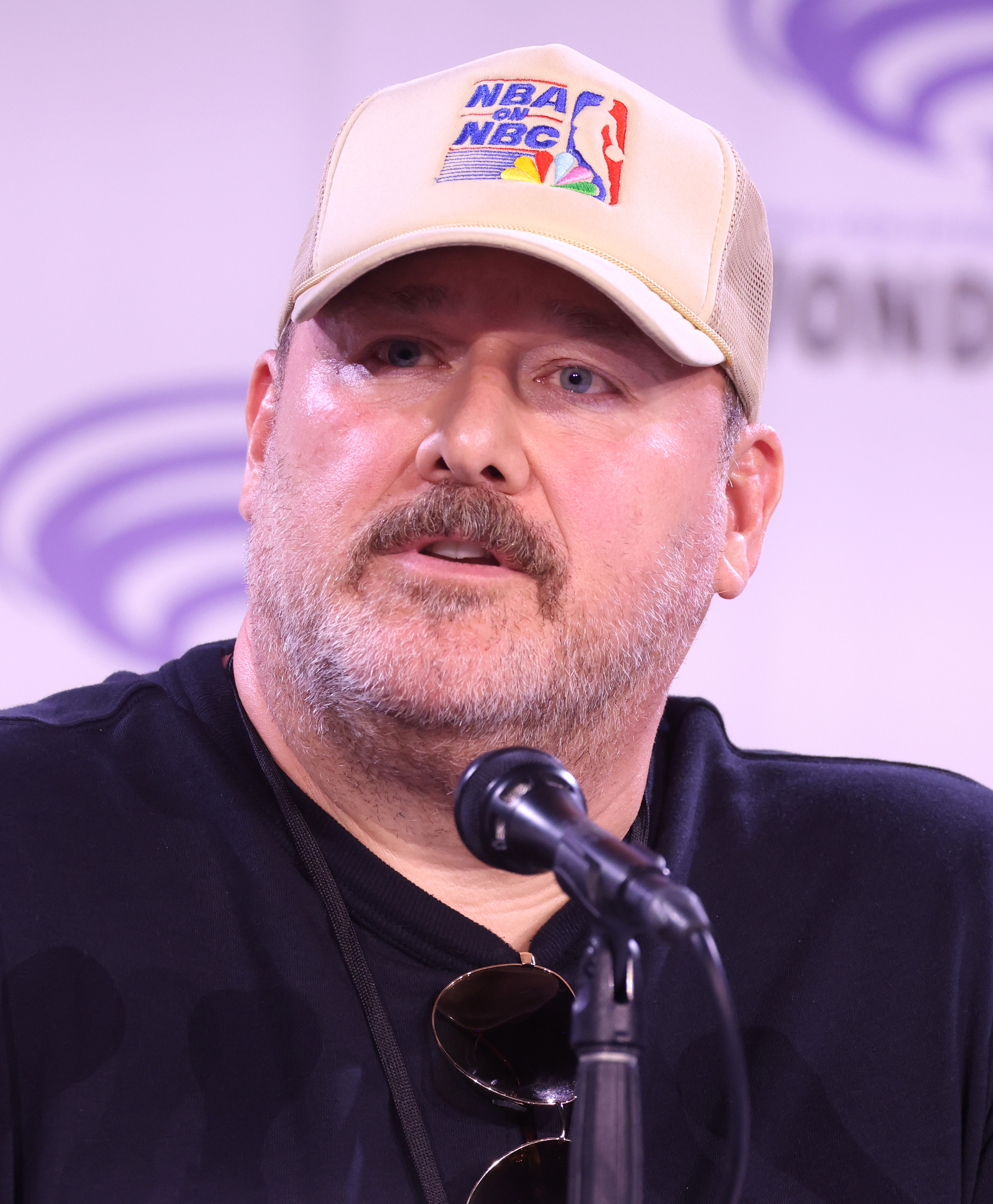
- Sasso in 2025
- Born: William Sasso; May 24, 1975 (age 51); Ladner, British Columbia, Canada
- Occupations: Actor; comedian; podcaster
- Spouse: Molly Drews (m. 2022)
- Children: 1

Comedy career
- Years active: 1990–present
- Medium: Film; television
- Genre: Sketch comedy

William Sasso (born May 24, 1975) is a Canadian actor, comedian and podcaster. After a starring role as Derek Wakaluk on the Global teen drama television series Madison (1994–1998), Sasso rose to significant fame as a regular cast member on the Fox sketch comedy series Mad TV (1997–2002).

In the 2000s, Sasso had a main role as Carl Monari on the ABC sitcom Less than Perfect (2003–2006) and supporting roles in the films Best in Show (2000), Southland Tales (2006), and College Road Trip (2008).

In the 2010s, Sasso portrayed Curly Howard in the slapstick comedy film The Three Stooges (2012), and also starred in the films The Right Kind of Wrong (2013), Hit by Lightning (2014), American Woman (2018), and The Grizzlies (2018). He had a starring voice role in the animated Christmas film Klaus (2019). In television, Sasso had main roles as Vincent Goodson on the CBS sitcom $#*! My Dad Says (2010–2011) and Ben Burns on the Audience and Amazon Prime Video series Loudermilk (2017–2020). He hosted the CBC reality series Fool Canada (2015).

In the 2020s, Sasso starred in the film Clown in a Cornfield (2025) and had a main role as Bill Ryan on the ABC sitcom United We Fall (2020). He had a recurring role as Doug Martin on the CBS sitcom How I Met Your Mother (2008–2012) and Jim McAllister on the CBS sitcom Young Sheldon (2022–2024), the latter role which he reprised in a starring capacity on the spin-off series Georgie & Mandy's First Marriage (2024–present).

== Early life ==
William Sasso was born on May 24, 1975, in Ladner, British Columbia, to Italian immigrant parents.

== Career ==
=== MADtv ===
By the end of its second season (1996–1997), the Fox network sketch comedy television series MADtv experienced its first big cast turnover. Three of the show's repertory performers (Bryan Callen, Orlando Jones and Artie Lange) left the cast. As a result, in 1997, casting executives at Fox had to cast replacements for the show. Sasso (alongside Alex Borstein and Aries Spears) was selected to join the MADtv third-season cast as a regular cast member. In 1999, Sasso fought against World Championship Wrestling's Bret Hart.

=== 2002–present ===
After leaving MADtv, Sasso's television appearances included four seasons as Carl Monari on the ABC sitcom Less than Perfect, as well as a role in Robson Arms. He played the role of Fortunio Balducci in Southland Tales.

He portrayed Randy Newman and James Lipton in the adult animated comedy film Stewie Griffin: The Untold Story (2005).

Sasso hosted the 2006 Canadian Comedy Awards in London, Ontario, as well as the festival's "Sketch & Improv Showcases". Additionally, he was a host at the 2005–2006 NHL award ceremony. Sasso appeared on the CSI episode "The Chick Chop Flick Shop". He also appeared in the Childrens Hospital episode "Frankfurters".

Sasso starred in the CBS sitcom $h*! My Dad Says, based on the Twitter feed Shit My Dad Says, created by Justin Halpern. The show premiered in late 2010 and its cancellation was announced on May 15, 2011.

Sasso began posting videos on the online video service Vine, creating a running gag of him violently vomiting lemons without warning.

In 2018, Sasso played Mountie Archambault in the comedy film Super Troopers 2. In November 2019, he voiced Mr. Ellingboe in Netflix's Klaus.

In 2020, he starred in the short-lived ABC sitcom United We Fall. From 2022 to spring 2024, Sasso had a supporting role as Jim McAllister in the CBS television series Young Sheldon. His portrayal of the character has extended in the sequel spinoff Georgie & Mandy's First Marriage, which debuted in October 2024.

In 2012, Sasso created the Ten Minute Podcast, which he hosted originally with Bryan Callen and Chris D'Elia, later replaced by Tommy Blacha and Chad Kultgen. In 2022, Sasso and Kultgen started a different podcast titled Dudesy.

In 2025, he starred in the horror film Clown in a Cornfield. Sasso later appeared on rapper/hip-hop record producer A-F-R-O's compilation album Trap Door, narrating the intro.

== Personal life ==
Sasso eloped with his wife Molly Drews on December 16, 2022.

Sasso is a professional wrestling fan, and has discussed his fandom multiple times.

== Filmography ==
=== Film ===
| Year | Film | Role | Notes |
|---|---|---|---|
| 1994 | Ski School 2 | Tomcat Collins | |
| 1994 | Ernest Goes to School | Russell | |
| 1995 | Magic in the Water | Shy Young Orderly | |
| 1995 | Malicious | Fat Guy Answering Phone | |
| 1996 | Happy Gilmore | Mover | |
| 1996 | Homeward Bound II: Lost in San Francisco | Pizza Boy | |
| 1997 | Beverly Hills Ninja | Chet Walters | |
| 1997 | The 6th Man | Guy in Bar | |
| 1998 | Brown's Requiem | "Fat Dog" Baker | |
| 1999 | Drop Dead Gorgeous | Hank Vilmes | |
| 2000 | Best in Show | Dale | |
| 2002 | Dawg | Willie Smits | |
| 2005 | Stewie Griffin: The Untold Story | Randy Newman / James Lipton (voice) | Video |
| 2006 | Southland Tales | Fortunio Balducci | |
| 2008 | Lower Learning | Jesse Buchwald | |
| 2008 | College Road Trip | Deputy O'Malley | |
| 2009 | Year of the Carnivore | Dirk | |
| 2010 | Life As We Know It | Miss Pennsylvania's Husband | |
| 2010 | For Christ's Sake | Alan | |
| 2011 | The Legend of Awesomest Maximus | Awesomest Maximus | |
| 2011 | Division III: Football's Finest | Terry Lockwood | |
| 2012 | The Three Stooges | Curly Howard | |
| 2012 | Moving Day | Clyde | |
| 2013 | Movie 43 | Jerry (The Pitch) | |
| 2013 | The Right Kind of Wrong | Neil | |
| 2014 | Hit By Lightning | Seth Gallagher | |
| 2014 | Beautiful Girl | Armand | |
| 2014 | Corner Gas: The Movie | Legal Aid Lawyer | |
| 2015 | I Am Chris Farley | Himself | Documentary |
| 2015 | Russell Madness | Hunk (voice) | |
| 2016 | Army of One | Roy | |
| 2016 | A Miracle on Christmas Lake | Mall Santa | |
| 2017 | The Female Brain | Dennis | |
| 2017 | Killing Hasselhoff | Wasserstein | |
| 2018 | Super Troopers 2 | Mountie Roger Archambault | |
| 2018 | American Woman | Terry | |
| 2018 | The Grizzlies | Mike | |
| 2018 | Henchmen | Gluttonator / Union Boss (voice) | |
| 2019 | Inside Game | Baba Battista | |
| 2019 | Klaus | Mr. Ellingboe (voice) | |
| 2020 | Irresistible | Big Mike | |
| 2020 | Film Fest | Montgomery Nash | |
| 2021 | Night of the Animated Dead | Sheriff McClelland (voice) | |
| 2021 | Boss Level | Brett | |
| 2022 | Dangerous Game: The Legacy Murders | Alec Betts | |
| 2023 | The Throwback | Matt | |
| 2024 | Deaner '89 | Glen | |
| 2025 | Clown in a Cornfield | Sheriff Dunne | |
| 2026 | Office Romance | Larry | |

=== Television ===
| Year | Show | Role | Notes |
|---|---|---|---|
| 1991 | Neon Rider | | Episodes: "Bread and Water" & "Providence" |
| 1994 | The Odyssey | Drewg | Episode: "Run for Your Life" |
| 1994–1997 | Madison | Derek Wakaluk | Main cast |
| 1995 | Annie O | Heckler #2 | TV movie |
| 1995–1996 | Sliders | Gomez Calhoun | Recurring cast: seasons 1–2 |
| 1996 | Heck's Way Home | Mover #1 | TV movie |
| 1996 | Doctor Who | Pete | TV movie |
| 1996 | Susie Q | Officer Bob | TV movie |
| 1997 | Dad's Week Off | Pete | TV movie |
| 1997–2009 | MADtv | Various Characters | Main cast: seasons 3–7; Guest: seasons 9–10, 14–15 |
| 1999 | WCW Nitro | Himself | Episode: "February 15, 1999" |
| 1999–2017 | Family Guy | Various Voices | 7 episodes |
| 2000 | The X-Files | Leslie Stokes | Episode: "Je Souhaite" |
| 2002 | WWF SmackDown | Fake Stone Cold Steve Austin | Episode: "February 7, 2002" |
| 2003–2006 | Less than Perfect | Carl Monari | Recurring cast: season 1; Main cast: seasons 2–4 |
| 2005 | Lilo & Stitch: The Series | Heckler / Sperk (voice) | Episodes: "Heckler" & "Bugby" |
| 2005–2008 | Robson Arms | Bark | Episodes: "ICQ" & "Geeks in Love" |
| 2006–2007 | 'Til Death | Russ | Episodes: "The Garage Band" & "The Anniversary Party" |
| 2007 | Entourage | Jay Lester | Episode: "Dog Day Afternoon" |
| 2007 | CSI: Crime Scene Investigation | Mason Lafoon | Episode: "The Chick Chop Flick Shop" |
| 2007 | October Road | Brett 'Big Boy' Rowan | Episode: "Let's Get Owen" |
| 2008 | Spaced | Bill | TV movie |
| 2008–2012 | How I Met Your Mother | Doug Martin | Episodes: "The Fight" & "Tailgate" |
| 2009 | Glenn Martin, DDS | Hekakiah (voice) | Episode: "Amish Anguish" |
| 2009 | Two and a Half Men | Andrew | Episode: "818-jklpuzo" |
| 2009 | Brothers | Anthony | Episodes: "Commercial/Coach DMV" & "Week in the Chair" |
| 2009–2010 | The Cleveland Show | Donald Trump / Robert De Niro (voice) | 3 episodes |
| 2010 | Neighbors from Hell | Balthazor Hellman | Main cast |
| 2010 | Childrens Hospital | Tucker | Episode: "Frankfurters. Allman Brothers. Death. Frankfurters." |
| 2010–2011 | $#*! My Dad Says | Vince | Main cast |
| 2011 | Mongo Wrestling Alliance | Booter Lee Bogg / Damien Mercury (voice) | Main cast |
| 2011 | Dream Crushers | Will | Episode: "Olympics" & "Poetry" |
| 2012 | WWE Raw | Curly | Episode: "Brock And Cena" |
| 2012 | Sullivan & Son | Robert Sherman | Episode: "Hank Speech" |
| 2012 | Up All Night | Paul | Episode: "Thanksgiving" |
| 2012 | Finding Mrs. Claus | Kris Claus | TV movie |
| 2013 | Family Tree | Accident Guy | Episode: "Civil War" |
| 2013 | Murder Police | Tommy Margaretti (voice) | Main cast |
| 2013 | Drunk History | Frank Nitti | Episode: "Chicago" |
| 2013 | The League | Officer Bungalon | Episode: "Rafi and Dirty Randy" |
| 2013 | Super Fun Night | Parker | Episode: "The Love Lioness" |
| 2013–2023 | King Star King | Various Voices | 2 episodes |
| 2014 | Justified | Al Sura | Recurring cast: season 5 |
| 2014 | Spun Out | Harper Thomas | Episode: "Unauthorized" |
| 2014 | About a Boy | Lou | Episode: "About a Plumber" |
| 2014 | Yu-Gi-Oh! Arc-V | The Sledgehammer (voice) | Episode: "Swing Into Action: Part 1 & 2" |
| 2014 | Anger Management | Jimmy | Episode: "Charlie Gets Trashed" |
| 2014 | The Britishes | Mr. Fetcher | Main cast |
| 2014–2015 | Hot in Cleveland | Franky | 3 episodes |
| 2014–2017 | Modern Family | Señor Kaplan | 3 episodes |
| 2015 | Assassin Banana | Baked Potato / Yellow Pepper (voice) | 2 episodes |
| 2015 | Young Drunk Punk | Yogi Raymond | Episode: "Yoga Show" |
| 2015 | The Comedians | Himself | Episode: "Come to the House" |
| 2015 | Fool Canada | Various | Main cast |
| 2015 | Key & Peele | Pirate | Episode: "Y'all Ready for This?" |
| 2015 | Robot Chicken | Phil Coulson (voice) | Episode: "Zeb and Kevin Erotic Hot Tub Canvas" |
| 2015–2018 | Another Period | Officer O'Connor | Recurring cast |
| 2016 | Shameless | Yanis | Recurring cast: season 6 |
| 2016 | Hashtaggers | Himself | Episode: "#GoodLightingPackage with Will Sasso" |
| 2016 | Love | Ben | Episode: "The Date" |
| 2016 | Childrens Hospital | Office Bailnt | Episode: "Childrens Horsepital" |
| 2016 | Motive | Hank Novak | Episode: "The Score" |
| 2016 | Those Who Can't | Coach Irontoe | Episode: "Plains High School Drifter" |
| 2017 | American Housewife | Billy | Episode: "The Polo Match" |
| 2017 | Raising Expectations | Liam | Episode: "What's Growing in Emmett's Room" |
| 2017 | Curb Your Enthusiasm | AC Repairman | Episode: "Namaste" |
| 2017 | Great News | Petey Pierce | Episode: "A Christmas Carol Wendelson" |
| 2017 | Budding Prospects | Gesh | TV movie |
| 2017–2018 | Kevin (Probably) Saves the World | Dave | Recurring cast |
| 2017–2020 | Loudermilk | Ben Burns | Main cast |
| 2018 | Law & Order: Special Victims Unit | Chris Sadler | Episode: "Send in the Clowns" |
| 2018 | Hawaii Five-0 | Dr. Shaw | Episode: "Ka Hana a Ka Makua, O Ka Hana No Ia a Keiki" |
| 2018–2019 | Grey's Anatomy | Jed | Episodes: "Blowin' in the Wind" & "Shelter From the Storm" |
| 2018–2019 | The Orville | Mooska | Episodes: "Ja'loja" & "Tomorrow, and Tomorrow, and Tomorrow" |
| 2019 | Tacoma FD | Gene Ghoulib | Episode: "Full Moon Fever" |
| 2019–2020 | Harley Quinn | Maxie Zeus / Jennifer's Husband (voice) | Episodes: "So, You Need A Crew?" & "Bachelorette" |
| 2019–2021 | Mom | Police Officer Andy Pepper | Recurring cast: seasons 6–8 |
| 2020 | Russell Maniac | Hunk (voice) | 7 episodes |
| 2020 | United We Fall | Bill Ryan | Main cast |
| 2020–2021 | F Is for Family | Mayor Anthony Tangenti (voice) | Guest: season 4, recurring cast: season 5 |
| 2022 | FBI | Vince Logan | Episode: "Fortunate Son" |
| 2022 | Acapulco | Joe | Recurring cast: season 2 |
| 2023 | The Marvelous Mrs. Maisel | Carmine Streeto | Episode: "The Testi-Roastial" |
| 2022–2024 | Young Sheldon | Jim McAllister | Recurring cast: seasons 6–7 |
| 2024–present | Georgie & Mandy's First Marriage | Jim McAllister | Main cast |
| 2025 | Solar Opposites | Skip | Episode: "The Eternal Sleep Sack" |

=== Music videos ===
| Year | Artist | Song | Role |
|---|---|---|---|
| 2002 | Sum 41 | "Still Waiting" | Record Executive |
| 2008 | Pink | "So What" | Neighbor |
| 2014 | Steel Panther | "Pussywhipped" | Cameo |

=== Web series ===
| Year | Title | Role | Episode |
|---|---|---|---|
| 2010 | Million Dollar Extreme | Spokesperson | Episode: "Techno Toys" |
| 2015 | Honest Trailers | Randy Newman | Episode: "Toy Story (feat. Will Sasso)" |
