= Men, Women & Children (film) =

2014 American film

- Theatrical release poster
- Directed by: Jason Reitman
- Screenplay by: Jason Reitman; Erin Cressida Wilson
- Based on: Men, Women & Children by Chad Kultgen
- Produced by: Jason Reitman; Helen Estabrook
- Starring: Rosemarie DeWitt; Jennifer Garner; Judy Greer; Dean Norris; Adam Sandler
- Cinematography: Eric Steelberg
- Edited by: Dana E. Glauberman
- Music by: Stephen Wilkinson
- Production company: Right of Way Films
- Distributed by: Paramount Pictures
- Release dates: September 6, 2014 (TIFF); October 3, 2014 (United States)
- Running time: 119 minutes
- Country: United States
- Language: English
- Budget: $16 million
- Box office: $2.2 million

Men, Women & Children is a 2014 American comedy-drama film directed by Jason Reitman and co-written with Erin Cressida Wilson, based on a novel of the same name written by Chad Kultgen that deals with online addiction. The film stars Rosemarie DeWitt, Jennifer Garner, Judy Greer, Dean Norris, Adam Sandler, Ansel Elgort, Kaitlyn Dever, and Timothée Chalamet in his film debut.

The film premiered at the 2014 Toronto International Film Festival on September 6, 2014. The film was released on October 3, 2014, by Paramount Pictures, and received generally negative reviews from critics. The film was a box office bomb, grossing $2.2 million against a $16 million budget.

== Plot ==
Set in a small town in Texas, this film follows several teens and their parents as they struggle in today's technology-obsessed world. Their communication, self-images, and relationships are all affected by the technological age, compounding the usual social difficulties people already encounter.

Don and Helen Truby are a sexually dissatisfied married couple. Helen starts having affairs through the social media website Ashley Madison, while Don regularly sees escorts through another site. Don accidentally catches sight of his wife's Ashley Madison account, then shows up where she's meeting her latest affair. The next day, both admit to having lapses in judgement and agree to ignore that the affairs ever happened.

The Trubys' teenage son Chris, a football player, is addicted to porn, and has found himself only able to become aroused by material not deemed socially normal. Hoping to achieve arousal through "traditional means", Chris tries to seduce classmate and cheerleader Hannah. However, as they start to initiate sex, he fails to become aroused. Hannah breaks up with him, subsequently telling everyone that they did in fact have sex.

Hannah longs to be famous, and her mother, Donna, aids her in this goal by running a website based around Hannah. At the mall, the two come across auditions for a television series one day; however, Hannah is disqualified due to the provocative photographs her mother had taken of her and posted to the site. Later on, Donna takes the site down, realizing how damaging it is to Hannah.

Football player Tim quits sports following his parents' divorce, preferring to spend most of his time playing a MMORPG. He later is pulled out of his depression when he begins dating the introverted Brandy Beltmeyer, whose overprotective mother Patricia obsessively monitors Brandy's online activity; Brandy has taken to expressing herself on a secret Tumblr account in retaliation. When the account and her conversations with Tim are discovered, Patricia completely revokes her daughter's internet privileges. Tim's father Kent confronts him, stating that Tim's mother abandoned both of them before deleting the game and demanding Tim continue football next year. Patricia then poses as Brandy and tells Tim that she is uninterested. Dejected, Tim overdoses on his antidepressants and nearly dies. Patricia realizes her protectiveness of her daughter has gone too far, and deactivates the surveillance devices she used to monitor Brandy.

Donna goes to content awareness meetings run by Patricia to learn about what is legally allowed on her daughter's website. There, she meets Kent and starts a relationship with him. After Donna informs him about the website, he wants to end their relationship. However, after reconciling with Tim and realizing how difficult it is to be a single parent, Kent reconnects with her.

Hannah's co-cheerleader Allison Doss has been starving herself for months over the summer, with the support of an online group. Her crush of several years, football player Brandon Lender, finally notices her. She shares her first kiss with him, and later has sex with him upon his insistence, which he treats casually and with disinterest. Allison develops an ectopic pregnancy, culminating in a miscarriage due to malnutrition. When she tells Brandon the news, his only concern is that others will discover they had sex. Realizing how selfish Brandon is, Allison throws a rock through his window in the middle of the night.

The movie ends with the narrator's message that humans should remember to be kind to one another and cherish the earth.

== Cast ==
- Emma Thompson (voice) as the narrator
- Rosemarie DeWitt as Helen Truby
- Jennifer Garner as Patricia Beltmeyer
- Judy Greer as Donna Clint
- Dean Norris as Kent Mooney
- Adam Sandler as Don Truby
- Ansel Elgort as Tim Mooney
- Kaitlyn Dever as Brandy Beltmeyer
- J. K. Simmons as Mr. Doss
- David Denman as Jim Vance
- Jason Douglas as Ray Beltmeyer
- Shane Lynch as Angelique
- Dennis Haysbert as Secretluvur
- Phil LaMarr as Shrink
- Olivia Crocicchia as Hannah Clint
- Elena Kampouris as Allison Doss
- Travis Tope as Chris Truby
- Tina Parker as Mrs. Doss
- Will Peltz as Brandon Lender
- Kurt Krakowian as Teacher
- Timothée Chalamet as Danny Vance
- Katherine Hughes as Brooke Benton
- Intern AJ as Football Player (uncredited)

== Production ==
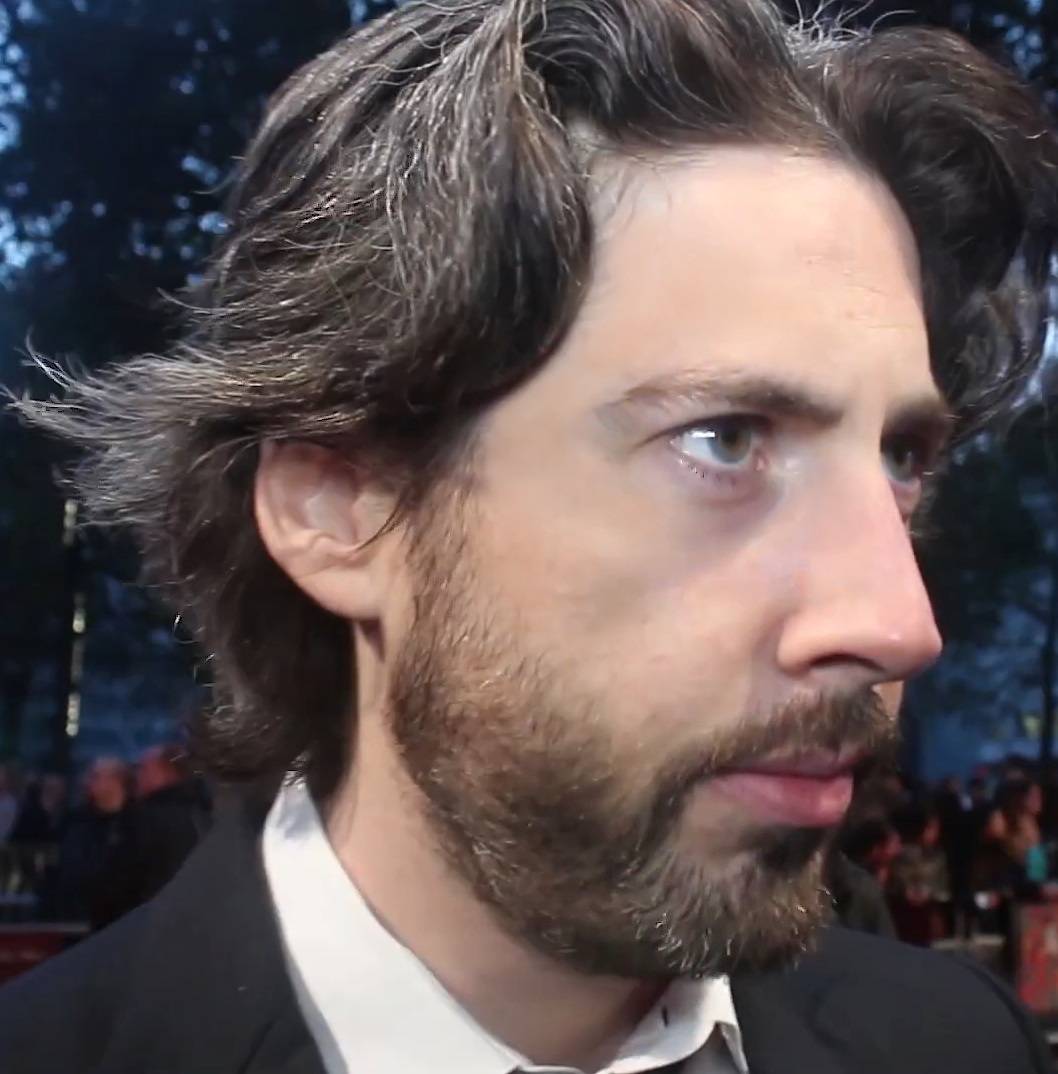
Jason Reitman at 2014 premiere

By September 4, 2013, Jason Reitman had cast Adam Sandler, Rosemarie DeWitt and Jennifer Garner in the lead roles. By December 16, Emma Thompson, Judy Greer and Dean Norris were cast.

The young cast includes Ansel Elgort, Kaitlyn Dever, Elena Kampouris, Travis Tope, Katherine Hughes, Olivia Crocicchia, and Timothée Chalamet. Other stars are David Denman, Jason Douglas, Dennis Haysbert, Shane Lynch, and J. K. Simmons. Will Peltz also joined the cast, on December 17.

Principal photography began on December 16, 2013, in and around Austin, Texas.

== Reception ==
=== Box office ===
Men, Women & Children premiered at the 2014 Toronto International Film Festival on September 6, 2014. The film opened in limited release on October 3, 2014, in 17 theaters and grossed $48,024 with an average of $2,825 per theater and ranking #48 at the box office. In its wide release on October 17 in 608 theaters the film grossed $306,367 with an average of $504 per theater and ranking #23, making it the fifth lowest opening in a release of 600 theaters or more. The film ultimately earned $705,908 in the United States and $1,534,627 internationally for a total of $2,240,535 worldwide, well below its $16 million production budget.

=== Critical response ===
The film received a "rotten" score of 33% on Rotten Tomatoes based on 139 reviews with an average rating of 4.90/10. The critical consensus states: "Men, Women & Children is timely, but director Jason Reitman's overbearing approach to its themes blunts the movie's impact." The film also has a score of 38 out of 100 on Metacritic based on 36 critics, indicating "generally unfavorable reviews". Film critic Robbie Collin felt Men, Women & Children "played like a spoof" with others agreeing the film was "mawkish and clichéd".
