= The Girl on the Train (2016 film) =

Film by Tate Taylor

- Theatrical release poster
- Directed by: Tate Taylor
- Screenplay by: Erin Cressida Wilson
- Based on: The Girl on the Train by Paula Hawkins
- Produced by: Marc Platt; Jared LeBoff
- Starring: Emily Blunt; Rebecca Ferguson; Haley Bennett; Justin Theroux; Luke Evans; Allison Janney; Édgar Ramírez; Lisa Kudrow
- Cinematography: Charlotte Bruus Christensen
- Edited by: Michael McCusker; Andrew Buckland
- Music by: Danny Elfman
- Production companies: DreamWorks Pictures; Reliance Entertainment; Marc Platt Productions
- Distributed by: Universal Pictures
- Release dates: September 20, 2016 (Odeon Leicester Square); October 7, 2016 (United States)
- Running time: 112 minutes
- Country: United States
- Language: English
- Budget: $45–50 million
- Box office: $173.2 million

The Girl on the Train is a 2016 American psychological thriller film directed by Tate Taylor and written by Erin Cressida Wilson, based on the 2015 novel of the same name by British author Paula Hawkins. The film stars Emily Blunt, Rebecca Ferguson, Haley Bennett, Justin Theroux, Luke Evans, Allison Janney, Édgar Ramírez, and Lisa Kudrow. The film follows an alcoholic divorcée who becomes involved in a missing person investigation.

Principal photography began on November 4, 2015, in New York City. Produced by Marc Platt and DreamWorks Pictures, The Girl on the Train was the first film produced by DreamWorks Pictures to return to be distributed by Universal Pictures as part of DreamWorks' new distribution deal via their new parent company Amblin Partners, following the end of their distribution deal with Walt Disney Studios Motion Pictures earlier that year.

The Girl on the Train premiered in London on September 20, 2016, before it was theatrically released in the United States on October 7, 2016. The film was a box office success, grossing $173 million worldwide but received mixed reviews from critics, though Blunt received lead actress nominations at the 23rd Screen Actors Guild Awards and the 70th British Academy Film Awards. A Hindi remake was released in 2021, with Bollywood actress Parineeti Chopra in the starring role.

== Plot ==
After losing her job and her marriage, recovering alcoholic Rachel Watson spends every day aimlessly riding a train into New York City. She fixates on the lives of her ex-husband Tom, his new wife Anna, and their neighbors, Scott and Megan Hipwell. Megan worked for Tom and Anna as a nanny for their baby Evie, but had recently quit.

During her marriage to Tom, Rachel became depressed about her infertility and developed a drinking problem, which led to blackouts and destructive behavior. At a barbecue held by Tom's boss, she drunkenly made a scene, causing Tom to get fired. Rachel often harasses Tom and Anna when she is drunk, calling them repeatedly, though she has little memory of this when she is sober.

One afternoon, Rachel spots Megan kissing a stranger. Infuriated, she goes to confront her but awakens in her own bed hours later, covered in blood. Megan is reported missing and Detective Riley questions Rachel, who was seen in the vicinity.

Rachel contacts Scott, posing as Megan's friend, to tell him about the affair. He shows her a picture of Megan's psychiatrist, Dr. Kamal Abdic, and Rachel identifies him as the man. Abdic is questioned as a suspect but reveals that Scott was emotionally abusive, and suspicion shifts to him.

Believing Abdic is involved in Megan's disappearance, Rachel books an appointment with him, but winds up discussing her own issues. He recalls a session with Megan in which she revealed she had a baby when she was very young. The baby accidentally drowned in the bathtub and Megan never forgave herself for it.

Megan is found dead and tests reveal she was pregnant, but the father was neither Scott nor Abdic. Scott enters Rachel's house and confronts her for lying about knowing Megan, directing the police toward Abdic, and leaving him as the new prime suspect. Rachel tries to report the assault to the police, believing Scott's violence suggests he may have murdered Megan. However, she learns Scott has been ruled out as a suspect as there is surveillance footage of him at a bar at the time.

On the train, Rachel sees Martha, the wife of Tom's former boss. Rachel apologizes for her behavior at the barbecue where (she was later told) she broke a platter, threw food, and insulted Martha. However, Martha reveals that Rachel just got sick and took a nap in their guest room. In fact, Tom was fired for sexually harassing co-workers.

Rachel realizes that Tom planted false memories in her head during her drinking binges. He was also physically violent with her during her blackouts, which accounts for the injuries she had when she awoke. Meanwhile, Anna suspects Tom of cheating and finds a cell phone hidden in their house; the voicemail greeting reveals that the phone belonged to Megan.

A now sober Rachel remembers on the day of Megan's disappearance, she caught Megan meeting Tom, and he hit her when she confronted them. Realizing Tom killed Megan, Rachel warns Anna.

When both women confront Tom, he becomes angry and knocks Rachel unconscious. Rachel awakens to Tom trying to kill her as Anna watches from the top of the stairs, guarding Evie. Rachel runs to the kitchen and picks up a corkscrew. After a scuffle, she stabs him in the neck with it. Anna then twists it deeper into Tom's neck, killing him. Interviewed by Riley, Rachel and Anna tell corroborating stories about killing Tom in self-defense after he admitted that he was Megan's killer. Anna admits that Rachel had been right about everything.

Later, Rachel visits Megan's tombstone at a cemetery. She then sits on the opposite side of the train, hopeful to move on.

== Cast ==
- Emily Blunt as Rachel Watson, a lonely, alcoholic divorcée
- Rebecca Ferguson as Anna Watson, a real-estate agent and Tom's wife
- Haley Bennett as Megan Hipwell, Anna and Tom's nanny
- Justin Theroux as Tom Watson, Rachel's ex-husband and Anna's current husband
- Luke Evans as Scott Hipwell, Megan's husband
- Allison Janney as DS. Riley, a detective
- Édgar Ramírez as Dr. Kamal Abdic, Megan's psychiatrist
- Lisa Kudrow as Martha, the wife of Tom's former boss
- Laura Prepon as Cathy, Rachel's college friend, roommate, and landlady
- Darren Goldstein as Man in the Suit, a stranger who witnesses Rachel's behavior

== Production ==
=== Development ===
DreamWorks Pictures acquired the film rights to Hawkins' novel and the film was planned for production by Marc E. Platt (through Marc Platt Productions) in March 2014. In early 2015, Erin Cressida Wilson was hired to write the script and Tate Taylor was hired to direct the film. Hawkins told The Sunday Times that the film's setting would be moved from London to Westchester, New York.

=== Casting ===
In June 2015, Emily Blunt was offered the title role of the lonely and alcoholic divorcée Rachel. The studio had eyed Kate Mara for another of the three lead roles. In August, Rebecca Ferguson was confirmed to play Anna and Haley Bennett was added to the cast to play the third female lead role, Megan.

Jared Leto and Chris Evans were in talks to join the film, where Evans would play Tom, Rachel's ex-husband, and Leto would play the neighbor's husband. However, Justin Theroux replaced Evans and Luke Evans replaced Leto, who both left the film due to scheduling issues. In October, Édgar Ramírez joined the film to play Dr. Kamal Abdic, who is having an affair with the married Megan, and becomes a suspect in her disappearance. Allison Janney also joined the cast to play a police detective. The next month, Lisa Kudrow was cast as Martha, the wife of Tom's former boss. Laura Prepon joined the cast as Cathy, the landlord, roommate, and college friend of Rachel Watson.

=== Filming ===
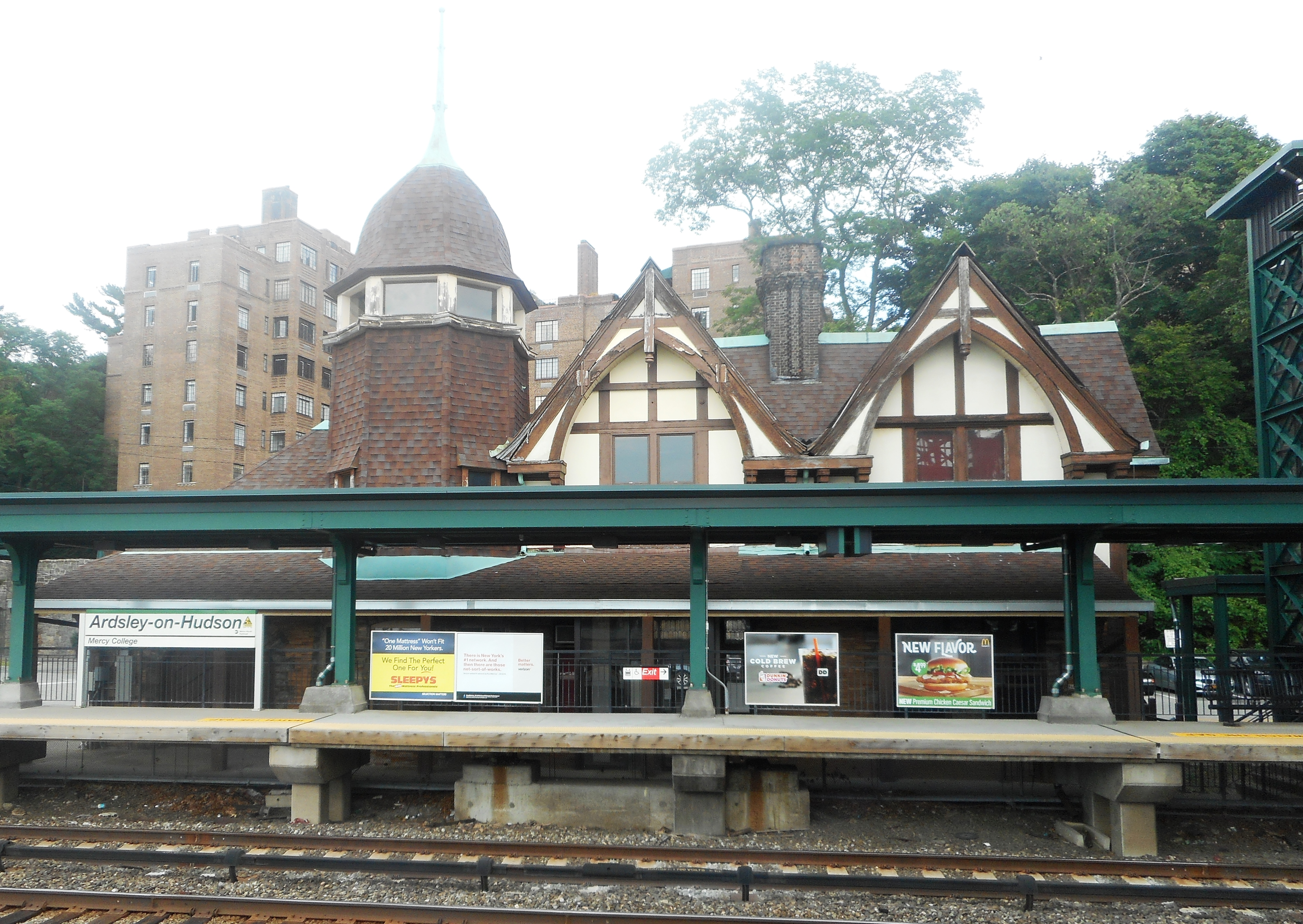
The Ardsley-on-Hudson Metro-North station, used for several scenes in the film

Principal photography on the film began on November 4, 2015, in New York City. In late November 2015, filming also took place in White Plains, as well as in Hastings-on-Hudson and Irvington, New York. Filming wrapped up on January 30, 2016.

=== Post-production ===
During post-production on the film, a cameo appearance by Paula Hawkins was cut from the film.

== Release ==
The film was part of DreamWorks' distribution deal with Walt Disney Studios, which began in 2009. In November 2015, Walt Disney Studios Motion Pictures scheduled the film for an October 7, 2016, release through their Touchstone Pictures banner. However, DreamWorks and Disney did not renew their distribution deal, and in December 2015, Universal Pictures acquired the film's distribution rights, as part of their new distribution deal with DreamWorks' parent company, Amblin Partners.

Universal retained Disney's original release date. Universal also distributed it overseas, except in India and most international territories where distribution was handled by Mister Smith Entertainment through other distributors. Entertainment One released the film in the United Kingdom on October 5, 2016.

=== Home media ===
Universal Pictures Home Entertainment released The Girl on the Train on Digital HD on January 3, 2017, and on Ultra HD Blu-ray, Blu-ray and DVD on January 17, 2017.

== Reception ==
=== Box office ===
The Girl on the Train grossed $75.4 million in the United States and Canada and $97.8 million in other countries for a worldwide total of $173.2 million, against a production budget of $45 million.

In the United States and Canada, the film was released alongside The Birth of a Nation and Middle School: The Worst Years of My Life, and was projected to gross around $25–30 million in its opening weekend, with some having it opening to as low as $18 million. The film was expected to play like the similarly themed Gone Girl, which opened to $37.5 million in October 2014, although that film had more star power to carry it. It went on to gross $24.5 million in its opening weekend, finishing first at the box office. In its second weekend it grossed $12 million, finishing second at the box office.

=== Critical response ===
On review aggregator Rotten Tomatoes, The Girl on the Train has an approval rating of 44% based on 307 reviews, with an average rating of 5.30/10. The website's critical consensus reads, "Emily Blunt's outstanding performance isn't enough to keep The Girl on the Train from sliding sluggishly into exploitative melodrama." On Metacritic, the film has a weighted average score of 48 out of 100, based on 49 critics, indicating "mixed or average reviews". Audiences polled by CinemaScore gave the film a grade of "B−" on an A+ to F scale.

IGN critic Terri Schwartz gave the film a score of 5.5/10, writing: "The Girl on the Train has a talented cast, but ultimately squanders it for the sake of a hollow, ponderous plot. Alternately overly convoluted and predictable, the film relies too heavily on its twists while offering little in the way of character development, leaving its three central women as unrelatable and unlikable stereotypes." Rolling Stone's Peter Travers gave the film a positive review, commenting that: "[T]he movie gives away the game faster than the novel, but Emily Blunt digs so deep into the role of a blackout drunk and maybe murderer that she raises Girl to the level of spellbinder."

Chicago Sun-Times' Richard Roeper gave 2 stars out 4, and said that the film is "shiny trash that begins with promise but quickly gets tripped up by its own screenplay and grows increasingly ludicrous and melodramatic, to the point where I was barely able to suppress a chuckle at some of the final scenes". Christy Lemire of RogerEbert.com gave 1 1/2 stars out of 4, and described the film as, "a flat and suspense-free tale of pretty people in peril".

=== Accolades ===
Award	Date of ceremony	Category	Recipient(s) and nominee(s)	Result	Ref.
British Academy Film Awards	February 12, 2017	Best Actress in a Leading Role	Emily Blunt	Nominated	
Hollywood Film Awards	November 6, 2016	Hollywood Producer Award	Marc Platt (also for Billy Lynn's Long Halftime Walk and La La Land)	Won	
Location Managers Guild Awards	April 8, 2017	Outstanding Film Commission Award	New York State Governor's Office of Motion Picture Development	Nominated	
Make-Up Artists and Hair Stylists Guild	February 19, 2017	Feature-Length Motion Picture – Contemporary Hair Styling	Alan D'Angerio	Nominated	
People's Choice Awards	January 18, 2017	Favorite Thriller Movie	The Girl on the Train	Won	
Saturn Awards	June 28, 2017	Best Thriller Film	The Girl on the Train	Nominated	
Saturn Awards	June 28, 2017	Best Actress	Emily Blunt	Nominated	
Screen Actors Guild Awards	January 29, 2017	Outstanding Performance by a Female Actor in a Leading Role	Emily Blunt	Nominated	

== See also ==
- George Tooker, "The Subway", (painting, 1950), at the Whitney Museum of American Art.
- Untermyer Fountain, Central Park, New York City
