= The Incredible Burt Wonderstone =

2013 American film by Don Scardino

- Theatrical release poster
- Directed by: Don Scardino
- Screenplay by: John Francis Daley; Jonathan Goldstein
- Story by: Chad Kultgen; Tyler Mitchell; John Francis Daley; Jonathan Goldstein
- Produced by: Chris Bender; Steve Carell; Jake Weiner; Tyler Mitchell
- Starring: Steve Carell; Steve Buscemi; Olivia Wilde; Alan Arkin; James Gandolfini; Jim Carrey
- Cinematography: Matthew Clark
- Edited by: Lee Haxall
- Music by: Lyle Workman
- Production companies: New Line Cinema; Benderspink; Carousel
- Distributed by: Warner Bros. Pictures
- Release dates: March 8, 2013 (SXSW); March 15, 2013 (United States)
- Running time: 100 minutes
- Country: United States
- Language: English
- Budget: $34 million
- Box office: $27.4 million

The Incredible Burt Wonderstone is a 2013 American comedy film directed by Don Scardino and written by John Francis Daley and Jonathan Goldstein, based on a story by Chad Kultgen and Tyler Mitchell, along with Daley and Goldstein. The film follows Las Vegas magician Burt Wonderstone (Steve Carell) as he attempts to reunite with his former partner Anton Marvelton (Steve Buscemi) to take on dangerous street magician Steve Gray (Jim Carrey). It also features Alan Arkin, Olivia Wilde, and James Gandolfini in his final film appearance during his lifetime.

Development began in 2006, when New Line Cinema bought Kultgen's script, "Burt Dickenson: The Most Powerful Magician on Planet Earth". The process gained momentum when Charles McDougall was hired as director in 2011, but he eventually left the project and was replaced with Scardino. Daley and Goldstein rewrote Kultgen's script which then had further rewrites from Jason Reitman in June 2011.

Filming was scheduled to begin in October 2011 in Los Angeles, California, but was pushed back to January 2012. On a $30 million budget, filming began on January 10, 2012, in Nevada with filming later moving to Los Angeles. The Incredible Burt Wonderstone was released on March 15, 2013, and earned over $27 million. Reviews generally praised Carrey's and Arkin's performances, but criticized the plot's inconsistent tone and predictability. Variety magazine listed The Incredible Burt Wonderstone as one of "Hollywood's biggest box office bombs of 2013" when it had made $27.4 million against a $30 million production cost.

== Plot ==
In 1982, young Albert Weinselstein is harassed by bullies. His mother gives him a special magic trick set by veteran magician Rance Holloway as his birthday present. He studies the instructional video and begins to practice some tricks, attracting the attention of a classmate, Anthony Mertz. They practice together and eventually become professional stage magicians Burt Wonderstone and Anton Marvelton, earning them success and an ongoing headlining act at the Bally's Hotel in Las Vegas. However, after ten years of performing the same tricks over and over again, Burt has become an overconfident, egocentric prima donna, and Anton begins to get fed up with Burt's ego, which has already cost them previous female assistants, all called "Nicole" in the act. In a rush, Burt enlists production assistant Jane as the new Nicole.

Burt and Anton encounter up-and-coming street magician Steve Gray performing a unique yet disturbing card trick for his TV magic show, Brain Rapist. Audience numbers soon dwindle at Burt and Anton's show, upsetting Bally's owner Doug Munny. Taking a cue from Gray's endurance-based stunts, Anton suggests that he and Burt try a similar tack—locking themselves in a Plexiglas cage called the "Hot Box" hung above Las Vegas Strip. Overconfident, Burt does not prepare for the stunt and almost instantly falls into a panic, causing the stunt to fail and injuring Anton, who angrily ends his partnership with Burt, and Jane also quits.

Burt refuses to change his act, staging his two-man show alone to disastrous results. Munny shuts down the production and Burt, having squandered his earnings over the years, is left broke. Despondent, Burt tries to find work and is eventually hired as an entertainer at an assisted-living facility catering to former Vegas entertainers. There, he meets Holloway, who retired several years before because he found that he was no longer happy performing. To show Holloway what the magician industry has become, Burt shows him Gray's performances which include feats such as sleeping all night on hot coals, holding his pee in for 12 days, keeping his eyes open for 3 days while being doused with mace, and regurgitating hard candy. In the process, Burt is shocked to see Jane—herself an aspiring magician—working for Gray. Appalled by Gray's style, Holloway and Burt polish their own tricks. Holloway also counsels Burt about magic, inspiring him to remember the initial wonder that led him to become a magician. Jane visits her grandmother at the facility and patches things up with Burt.

Doug is opening a new casino-hotel and is offering a five-year contract to the winner of a talent search on the casino's opening night. He invites Burt to do a magic show at his son's birthday party, but Gray also appears and tries to upstage Burt with his own tricks. Disgusted by Gray's actions, Jane leaves his show. Burt reconnects with Anton, who has been distributing magic sets in Cambodia. A drug found in Cambodia called kratom that instantly puts users into a deep sleep gives them an idea to perform a sensational trick that they were never able to perfect: the "Disappearing Audience".

At the talent search show, Gray's performance involves him drilling into his brain, in which he survives but leaves him with brain damage. Holloway then introduces Burt, Anton, and Jane's performance before they secretly sedate the audience with kratom sleeping gas to awaken at an outside location in the same seating arrangement. The audience responds with awe, and Doug awards the headlining act to Burt and Anton; they ask Jane to be their opening act. The trio then performs the Disappearing Audience trick again, returning everyone to the casino theater, as the now mentally-impaired Gray watches on with the drill bit still in his skull.

The final scene shows how Burt, Anton, Holloway, and others transported the audience to the open area, by unceremoniously dragging and transporting the unconscious audience members to the area, and hauling them from and to the theater in a moving van.

== Cast ==
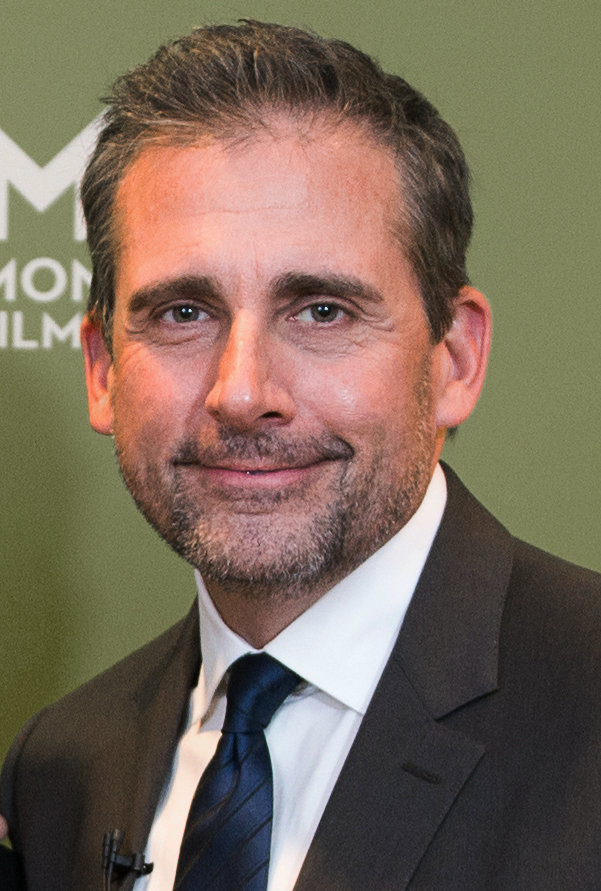
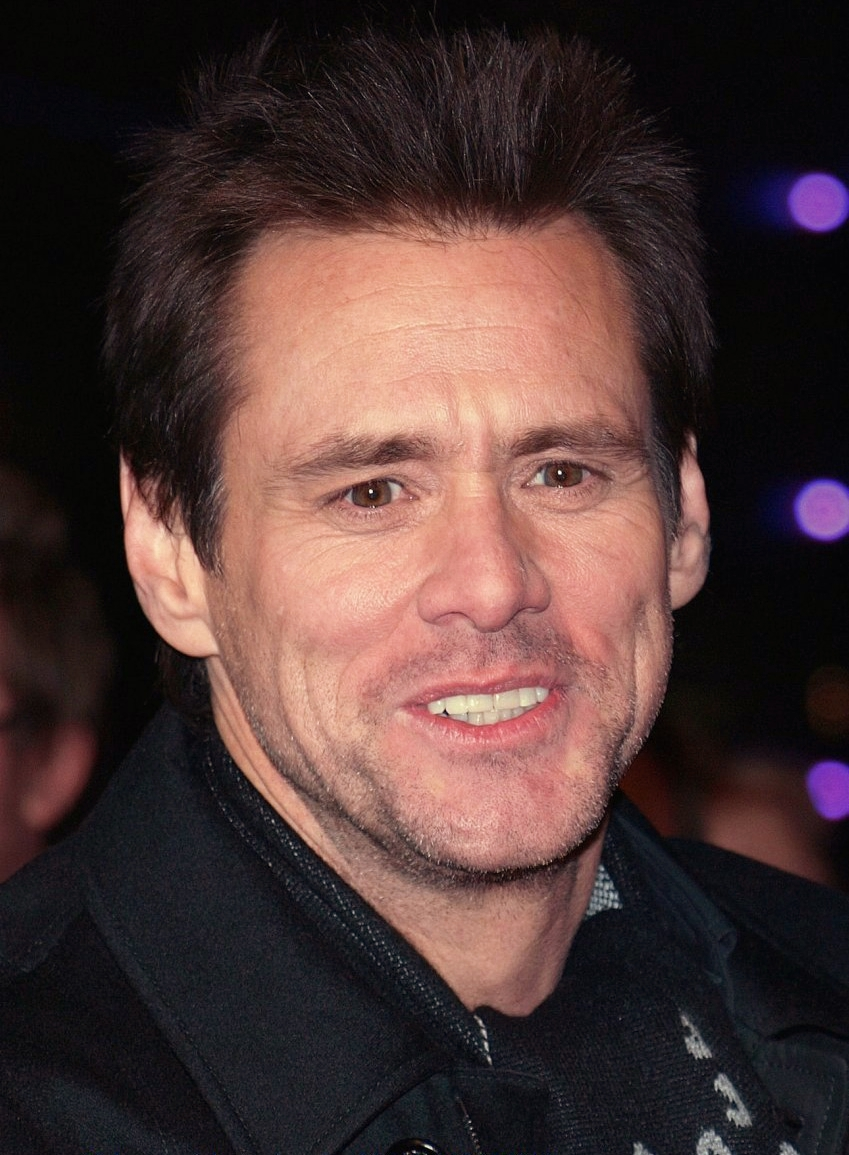
Steve Carell plays Burt Wonderstone and Jim Carrey plays Steve Gray, in their third co-starring film after 2003's Bruce Almighty and 2008's Horton Hears a Who!.
- Steve Carell as Albert Weinselstein / Burt Wonderstone, a formerly successful magician. The character's design is based partly on famous magicians Siegfried & Roy. Mason Cook, who was eleven years old in 2012, portrays Wonderstone as a child. Cook learned several magic tricks under a magic supervisor to portray Wonderstone as he begins to discover magic.
- Steve Buscemi as Anthony Mertz / Anton Marvelton, Wonderstone's former partner. Buscemi entered negotiations for a role on October 31, 2011. Luke Vanek, who was eleven years old in 2012, portrays Marvelton as a child.
- Jim Carrey as Steve Gray, a street-magician with a dangerous act. Carrey entered negotiations for a role in the film in October 2011. The character was described by Scardino as "if David Blaine and Criss Angel had a child", but that Carrey is "such an idiosyncratic performer, he's not quite either of those guys." Carrey undertook a strict diet to lose weight and improve his physique for the role. The character was originally written as a low-key, bored villain who spoke so quietly that people would lean in to hear him, but after Carrey joined he wanted to take the character in a "Jesus-y" direction. Adam Pally was considered for the role.
- Olivia Wilde as Jane, Burt and Anton's assistant who dreams of becoming a magician. On October 27, 2011, it was reported that Wilde, Michelle Monaghan, Judy Greer, Sarah Silverman, and Jessica Biel were in contention for the female lead. This list was reduced to Silverman, Wilde, and Greer, with all making strong impressions on the filmmakers but with Wilde as the front-runner. It was later reported that the filmmakers were waiting for Biel's audition before their final decision.
- James Gandolfini as Doug Munny, billionaire owner of the Bally's Casino where Burt and Anton perform. Gandolfini was reported to be in talks for the role on October 29, 2011. In early December, Gandolfini traveled to Las Vegas to research his role, speaking with magicians Criss Angel and Nathan Burton, and The Mirage casino president Felix Rapaport and executive Kenny Epstein, and philanthropist Larry Ruvo. Rappaport stated that Gandolfini wanted to prepare for the role by "getting insights in Las Vegas, specifically in the entertainment world and the world of magic".
- Alan Arkin as Rance Holloway, an elderly magician who inspired Burt to become a magician. Holloway was originally scripted to die, but the studio decided that audiences would have too much of a connection to the character and so he remained alive.

The cast also includes: Jay Mohr as magician Rick the Implausible; Michael Herbig as Lucius Belvedere, a magician with a German background and a thing for cats; Zachary Gordon as a bully from Wonderstone's youth; Brad Garrett as Dom, Burt's accountant; Gillian Jacobs as Miranda, a fan of magic who has a one-night stand with Wonderstone; and illusionist David Copperfield cameos as himself. The film's co-writer John Francis Daley cameos as a paramedic.

== Production ==
=== Development ===
Development started in 2006 when New Line Cinema bought Chad Kultgen's script, titled "Burt Dickenson: The Most Powerful Magician on Planet Earth". By September 2010, Steve Carell had joined the film, and the script had been completely rewritten by screenwriting team John Francis Daley and Jonathan Goldstein. The pair extensively researched the lifestyle of Vegas magicians, taking note of the pressure of performing multiple times a day and the consequence of living within the "Vegas bubble where you're not exposed to the outside world [which] can actually make someone stir-crazy or egotistical". In July 2011, the story was described as following Burt Wonderstone, a formerly successful magician who was overshadowed by a younger, edgier magician. However, by the time Jim Carrey had joined the project in October 2011, the younger magician character had become simply a rival magician, and Burt was now part of a formerly successful magic duo.

The script went through many changes during its years of development, with Daley and Goldstein alone writing approximately fifteen drafts over a three-and-a-half-year period. There were four different final acts, including one where Holloway is revealed as a betrayer. Discussing the script changes while the project entered production, producer Chris Bender said: "it was tone, finding the right tone, because it was originally written more broadly where certain magic things were happening that wouldn't actually be real magic and also, over time, the references that we were making in terms of the new school of magic and the old school of magic were becoming dated... Once [Carell] came on board, that's when things really took off... And then finding the right director, too. These kind of comedies scare directors a lot because you're taking a chance and you're going for something bold comedy-wise that either could be a big hit or it could really miss." Scenes of the young Wonderstone being inspired by a video of Rance Holloway, and buying a magic set were based on Daley's own childhood, in which he viewed a similar video of magician Mark Wilson.

In February 2011, director Charles McDougall joined, but by April 2011, McDougall had left the project with no reason cited. In June 2011, 30 Rock director Don Scardino was confirmed to take the director chair. On June 16, 2011, Jason Reitman was brought aboard the project to perform additional rewrites to Daley's and Goldstein's script. Reitman was reportedly paid for several weeks of work, but the extent of his involvement or the script changes was not detailed.

Michael Schur, who produced and wrote for Carell on The Office, also provided a rewrite of the script.

=== Filming ===
Filming had been scheduled to begin in October 2011, in Los Angeles, California, but was pushed back to January 2012, with casting of the remaining lead roles occurring throughout October. Principal photography began on January 10, 2012, lasted approximately 47 days and had a $30 million budget. The film was shot on film stock instead of digital because it was decided that the difference in cost between the two was negligible, and the day shooting and color palettes of the magicians' outfits such as black and red were thought to be captured better on the stock. Among the locations used during the Las Vegas shooting are interiors and exteriors at the Bally's Las Vegas hotel and casino, and exteriors of the Las Vegas Strip, Downtown Las Vegas, Fremont Street, and Binion's Gambling Hall and Hotel. Scardino, who had not filmed in Las Vegas since helming an episode of Tracey Takes On... approximately fifteen years earlier, described shooting on location in the city as "an absolute must". Scardino added "We just felt that, to give the movie authenticity, it had to be on the Strip". Carell was filmed on the Strip because Scardino believed his character is "a creature of the Strip", and Carrey was filmed "in and around Fremont Street", where his character felt more at home. Scardino explained the decision to film the characters in these environments, saying the "two different worlds" of Vegas "helps define our talent", with the "ever-changing Strip" providing contrast with "the frozen-in-time aspect of Fremont Street".

By January 16, 2012, filming moved to Los Angeles and southern California, including the Wadsworth Theatre. Filming had concluded by March 13, 2012, after forty-nine days. When Scardino boarded the project, the script contained several magic tricks that could not realistically occur on stage such as lasers decapitating two individuals and the heads then switching bodies, which would have required the use of computer visual effects to accomplish. Scardino insisted that most of the magic tricks should be credible feats to make the magicians seem more believable, but some tricks still required visual effects. David Copperfield served as a technical advisor and developed a live stage illusion for the climax, featuring a body switch between Carell's and Buscemi's characters. Scardino insisted that the illusion should not depend on camera tricks, stating "I wanted one big stage illusion where you go, 'Oh, wow, how'd they do that?'" Copperfield provided instructions on how the trick worked and was present on set during its filming. Other magic advisors ensured that hand movements during tricks were correct, and served as hand-doubles. Producer Chris Bender said that the setting is a fictional history of the world of magic, and so the filmmakers avoided casting many real magicians.

== Release ==
The Incredible Burt Wonderstone premiered as the opening film of the SXSW festival on March 8, 2013; it was introduced by Carell, Carrey, and Wilde. The film received a wide release in North America and the United Kingdom on March 15, 2013.

=== Box office ===
The film earned $22.5 million in North America and $4.9 million elsewhere for a worldwide total of $27.4 million, against a budget of $30 million.

In the week prior to its release in North America, the film was predicted to earn approximately $18 million and finish as the number 2 film of the weekend behind Oz the Great and Powerful. It earned $3.72 million through opening day including midnight showings at 1,800 theaters. Opening weekend earned $10.2 million from 3,160 theaters—an average of $3,221 per theater—ranking third for the weekend behind new release The Call ($17.1 million) and holdover Oz the Great and Powerful ($41.3 million). The gross was one of the lowest openings for a Carell or Carrey film. In its second weekend, earnings dropped by 58% to $4.32 million, putting it in seventh place.

=== Critical reception ===
On review aggregation website Rotten Tomatoes the film has an approval rating of 37% based on 193 reviews, and an average rating of 5.16/10. The site's critical consensus reads: "The Incredible Burt Wonderstone serves up some goofy laughs, but given its outrageous conceit, it's surprisingly safe and predictable." On Metacritic it has a weighted average score of 44/100 based on reviews from 35 critics, indicating "mixed or average reviews". CinemaScore polls reported that the average grade moviegoers gave the film was a C+ on a scale of A+ to F.

The plot was a focal point for criticism. Reviewers considered the tone uneven, segueing between dark comedy and family film, the extreme stunts of Carrey's Steve Gray, and sentimentality, and serious drama and farcical comedy. Several reviewers noted that the plot was predictable, and dated. Total Film's Matthew Leyland said that the attention to detail in terms of magician gestures, posture and dialog created a "withering showbiz satire", which is sidelined in favor of sentimentality. Entertainment Weekly's Owen Gleiberman said that the film is too cautious and unimaginative, choosing "earnest and mushy" over increasingly wild surprise, and Empire's Helen O'Hara considered the script unfocused and the tone uneven, which undermined Carell's efforts to portray Wonderstone's return to glory, and The New York Times' Stephen Holden said that the film's message was unoriginal and delivered without any special conviction. In contrast, Richard Roeper said that it is "dark and wickedly funny", and Variety's Joe Leydon said that it neatly balanced sentimentality with edgy comedy. Time's Mary Pols said that though the film does not always work, it did so enough that she thought it could be "the kind of semi-bad, semi-inspired comedy that could not only stand repeated viewings but perhaps improve with them".

Carrey's performance was generally praised for his humor and return to the physical style of comedy employed early in his career. Roeper said that Carrey is "physical, he's intense, he's ridiculous—and he made me laugh more than any comedic character in recent memory", and Alan Scherstuhl said that Carrey's "cartoon expressiveness" was used to its most judicious ends in years. Gleiberman said Carrey was one of the funniest components of the film, and Holden said that Carrey steals every scene he is in with a "take-no-prisoners ferocity that he hasn't demonstrated in years". The Boston Globe's Ty Burr however said that Carrey is good at being loud, but not funny. Arkin was also praised, with Chicago Tribune's Michael Phillips saying that he "can't save the movie, but he can save his scenes". Roeper labeled him a marvel, and Leydon called his performance scene-stealing. Leyland said that Carell's likability helped carry the sentimental segments, but Holden considered that his performance gave Wonderstone a soulfulness that undermined the film's farcical aspirations and left the character lacking "a shark's bite". Leydon said that Buscemi offered an engaging performance as the amiable Anton Marvelton, and Wilde was generally considered to have delivered a fine performance in an underwritten role. Pols said that the prospect of Wonderstone attracting Wilde's wholesome and intelligent Jane were absurd, but that Wilde's portrayal was game enough to remove the creepiness.

Phillips and Los Angeles Times's Kenneth Turan criticized Scardino's direction, saying that the film offers slow and crude scenes over the fleet-footed material directed by Scardino on 30 Rock. Leydon conversely said that the director unobtrusively handled the gradual shifts in tone between black comedy and buddy comedy.

=== Accolades ===
The Incredible Burt Wonderstone received three nominations for the 2013 Teen Choice Awards: Choice Movie – Comedy, Choice Movie Actor – Comedy for Steve Carell, and Choice Movie Actress – Comedy for Olivia Wilde.

== See also ==
- List of films set in Las Vegas
