= Fool Canada =

- Genre: Comedy reality
- Starring: Will Sasso; Craig Lauzon; Sam Kalilieh; Sara Hennessey
- Country of origin: Canada
- No. of seasons: 1

Production
- Production company: Shaftesbury Films

Original release
- Network: CBC Television
- Release: June 23 – June 30, 2015

Fool Canada is a Canadian television series that aired on CBC Television in 2015.

Hosted by comedian Will Sasso, the program features Sasso and other cast members, including Craig Lauzon, Sam Kalilieh and Sara Hennessey, performing hidden camera pranks in various locations across Canada. The series is based on the British comedy series Fool Britannia.

The show premiered on June 23, 2015.
