= Chad Kultgen =

American novelist and journalist born 1976

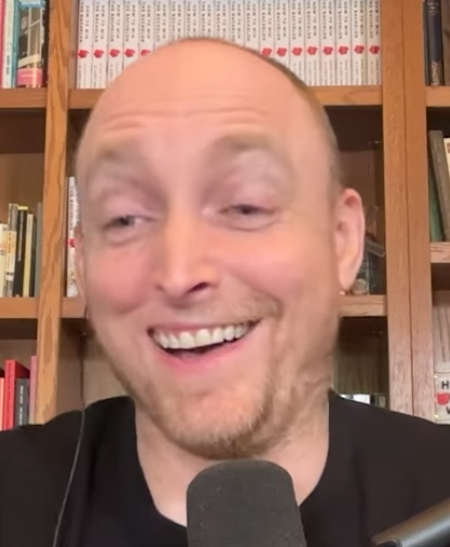
- Kultgen interviewed on the Who Dem? Podcast in 2025
- Born: Spokane, Washington, U.S.
- Occupations: Novelist, film writer, producer
- Writing career
- Movements: Materialism, sexual liberation, hedonism

Chad Kultgen is an American novelist, journalist, and podcaster. He published the nonfiction book How to Win the Bachelor with his podcasting co-host Lizzy Pace. He also hosts a podcast with his sister Haley Popp, mother Mary Lou, and father Bob Kultgen called The Necessary Conversation on YouTube.

Some critics have said that his male protagonists are misogynistic and trite. Kultgen says he "get[s] at least a few Facebook messages every week from someone who has come across the book and enjoyed it. I also get messages from people who didn't enjoy the book. They tend to be a bit irate and usually take the time to tell me that I'm the worst living writer, the world would be a better place without me, I have no understanding of women or all of my books should be burned. So I guess I'd say the reaction to the first book was ... strong on both sides." A New York Times piece in 2011 interviewed people who asserted that characters in his works were based on them.

His 2011 book Men, Women, and Children was released as a feature film in 2014, featuring Adam Sandler, Emma Thompson, Ansel Elgort, and Jennifer Garner. Critical and commercial reception was poor, and the film netted only 2.2 million dollars at the box office.

In 2024, Kultgen and comedian Will Sasso were sued by the estate of George Carlin after posting a comedy special to YouTube, claiming it was written by a "comedy AI" called Dudesy that had been trained on the late comedian's work. In response to the lawsuit, a spokesperson for Sasso explained that the video had not been written by AI, but by Kultgen.

== Works ==
- The Average American Male (2007)
- The Lie (2009)
- Men, Women, and Children (2011)
- The Average American Marriage (2013)
- Darklight (2014)
- Strange Animals (2015)
- Ten Minute Podcast (2016)
- How to Win the Bachelor (2021)
- Dudesy (2022)

== Film credits ==
- The Incredible Burt Wonderstone (2013; writer, actor)
- Men, Women, and Children (2014)
