= The Girl on the Train (novel) =

2015 novel by Paula Hawkins

- First edition
- Author: Paula Hawkins
- Audio read by: Clare Corbett; Louise Brealey; India Fisher
- Language: English
- Genre: Thriller
- Published: 13 Jan 2015 (Riverhead, US); 15 Jan 2015 (Doubleday, UK)
- Publication place: United Kingdom
- Media type: Print (hardback)
- Pages: 317 (SK); 395 (US); 320 (UK)
- ISBN: 978-1-59463-366-9

The Girl on the Train is a 2015 psychological thriller novel by British author Paula Hawkins. The novel debuted in the number one spot on The New York Times Fiction Best Sellers of 2015 list (print and e-book) dated 1 February 2015, and remained in the top position for 13 consecutive weeks, until April 2015.

The audiobook edition, released by Books on Tape, was narrated by Clare Corbett, Louise Brealey and India Fisher. It won the 2016 Audie Award for "Audiobook of the Year".

The film rights were acquired before the book was published, in 2014, by DreamWorks Pictures for Marc Platt Productions. The American film adaptation, starring Emily Blunt and directed by Tate Taylor, had its world premiere on 20 September 2016 in London, less than a month before its theatrical release in the United States on 7 October.

== Plot ==
Rachel Watson is a 33-year-old woman with behavioural issues related to her alcoholism. Her drinking has led to the end of her marriage to Tom, who left her for another woman. It has also caused her to lose her job; she frequently binges and has blackouts. Tom has since re-married to Anna Boyd and has a daughter with her, Evie – a situation that fuels Rachel's self-destructive tendencies. Though currently unemployed, Rachel still follows her old routine of taking the train to and from London every day, one at 8:04 in the morning and the other at 5:56 in the evening. This routine is one of her few excuses to leave her apartment, and prevents her roommate, Cathy, from discovering that she is unemployed. The train passes Rachel's old home on Blenheim Road, where Tom, Anna, and Evie now live. From the train, Rachel also watches a couple who live a few houses away from Tom. She idealizes their life (christening them "Jason" and "Jess"), and fantasizes about being friends with them. However, "Jess", whose real name is Megan Hipwell, has a troubled past and a far from perfect life. She has had several lovers, including her therapist, Dr. Kamal Abdic.

One day, from the train, Rachel witnesses Megan passionately embracing another man. The next day, after heavy drinking, Rachel awakens to find herself bloody and injured, with no memories of the night before. She learns that Megan is missing, and is questioned by the police after Anna reports having seen her drunkenly staggering around the night of Megan's disappearance. Rachel tells the police she thinks Megan was having an affair. She then contacts Megan's husband, Scott ("Jason"), leading him to believe that she and Megan were friends. Rachel learns that the man she saw kissing Megan was Kamal.

Rachel contacts Kamal, lying about her identity to get close to him and learn more about him. She makes a therapy appointment with him to see if he can help her recall the events that happened during her blackout that night. Rachel begins to gain insight into her life by speaking with him, inadvertently benefiting from the therapy. Her connections to Scott and Kamal, though built on lies, make her feel more important. She manages to not drink for days at a time, but always relapses. Meanwhile, she continues to call, visit, and harass Tom. Megan's body is found; she is revealed to have been pregnant, and her unborn child was fathered by neither Scott nor Kamal. As Scott discovers Rachel's lies and lashes out at her, her memories become clearer. Rachel remembers seeing Megan get into Tom's car. Anna discovers that Tom and Megan were having an affair.

Rachel begins trusting her own memories more, and realises that many of the incidents Tom said she caused while drunk never really happened. He had been gaslighting her for years, making her question her sanity. Armed with this realisation, and the suspicion that he might have killed Megan, Rachel warns Anna. When Anna confronts him, Tom confesses to murdering Megan after she threatened to reveal the affair. Anna is cowed, fearing for her daughter's safety. Tom tries to beat and intimidate Rachel into keeping silent, but she defies him and fights back. Rachel stabs Tom with a corkscrew; Anna helps Rachel make sure that he dies from the wound. When the police arrive, Rachel and Anna support each other by corroborating their stories to explain their actions as self-defence. After this, Rachel decides to quit drinking and move on with her life.

== Reception ==
By early March, less than two months after its release, the novel had sold over one million copies, and an additional half million by April. It occupied the #1 spot of the UK hardback book chart for 20 weeks, breaking the record for the longest any book had held the top spot. By 2021, it had sold an estimated 23 million copies worldwide.

Kirkus Reviews gave the novel a starred review, writing that: "even the most astute readers will be in for a shock as Hawkins slowly unspools the facts, exposing the harsh realities of love and obsession's inescapable links to violence." Subsequently, the novel was honoured by Kirkus Reviews as one of the best novels of 2015. The book also won the 2015 Goodreads Choice Award in the category Mystery & Thriller.

In a less positive review for The New York Times, Jean Hanff Korelitz questioned the novel's narrative structure and criticised the protagonist for behaving "illogically, self-destructively, and narcissistically."

The Girl on the Train has been compared to Gone Girl by Gillian Flynn, as both novels employ unreliable narrators and deal with suburban life. Paula Hawkins has dismissed these comparisons, however, saying in an interview with The Hollywood Reporter: "Amy Dunne is a psychopath, an incredibly controlling and manipulative, smart, cunning woman. [Rachel is] just a mess who can't do anything right."

== Film adaptations ==
=== American adaptation ===
The film rights for the novel were acquired in March 2014 by DreamWorks Pictures and Marc Platt Productions, with Jared Leboff (a producer at Marc Platt) set to produce. Tate Taylor, who directed The Help (2011), was announced as the director of this film in May 2015, with Erin Cressida Wilson as scriptwriter. In June 2015, British actress Emily Blunt was in talks to portray Rachel. Author Hawkins said in July 2015 that the film's setting would be moved from the UK to the US. The film began production in the New York City area in October 2015. The film was released on 7 October 2016. It remains mostly faithful to events in the book; the only distinct difference is that Rachel realises the truth about Tom's accusations of her behaviour except that she does it through a chance meeting with the wife of Tom's former manager (instead of her own efforts); the wife reveals that Tom was actually fired from his job because of his numerous affairs at the office, rather than Rachel's having a violent breakdown at a party. (In reality, Rachel simply drank too much and passed out in a guest room until Tom made her leave.)

=== Indian adaptation ===
On 24 April 2019 it was announced an Indian adaptation of the book was in the works, starring Parineeti Chopra. The film was directed by Ribhu Dasgupta and produced under the banner of Reliance Entertainment. Principal photography began in early August 2019 in London. Unlike the 2016 American adaptation, the Indian adaptation retained the book's original UK setting, but changed the majority of the character to Non-Resident Indians. The film's original release date of 8 May 2020 was delayed due to the COVID-19 pandemic. The film was eventually released on 26 February 2021 on Netflix.

== Stage adaptation ==
A stage adaptation of the novel by Rachel Wagstaff and Duncan Abel made its world premiere in The Courtyard Theatre at the West Yorkshire Playhouse from 12 May to 9 June 2018. It stars Jill Halfpenny as Rachel Watson and is directed by Joe Murphy.

In 2022 it is presented by the Court Theater in Christchurch, New Zealand.

In 2024, the play had its Canadian premiere at Vertigo Theatre in Calgary, Alberta.
