= Paula Hawkins (author) =

British novelist

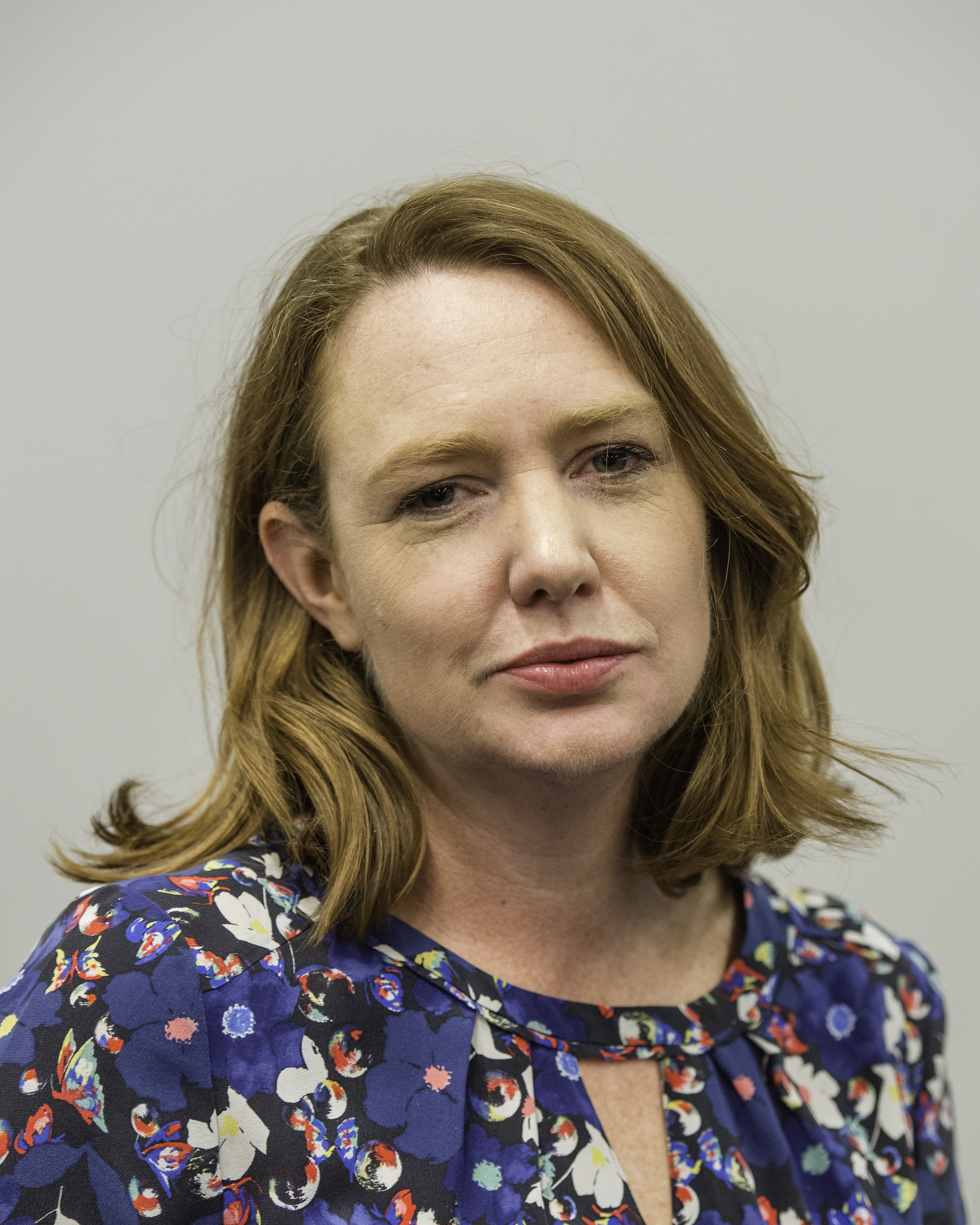
- Hawkins at Gothenburg Book Fair in 2015
- Born: 26 August 1972 (age 54); Salisbury, Rhodesia
- Education: Keble College, Oxford
- Occupations: Novelist, journalist
- Writing career
- Pen name: Amy Silver
- Notable work: The Girl on the Train
- Website: paulahawkinsbooks.com

Paula Hawkins (born 26 August 1972) is a Rhodesian/Zimbabwean-British author best known for her top-selling psychological thriller novel The Girl on the Train (2015), which deals with themes of domestic violence, alcohol, and drug abuse. The novel was adapted into a film starring Emily Blunt in 2016. Hawkins' second thriller novel, Into the Water, was released in 2017.

== Life and career ==
Hawkins was born and raised in Harare, Zimbabwe (known at the time as Salisbury, Rhodesia), the daughter of Anthony "Tony" Hawkins and his wife Glynne. Her father was an economics professor and financial journalist. Before moving to London in 1989 aged 17, Hawkins attended Arundel School, Harare, Zimbabwe then studied for her A-Levels at Collingham College, an independent college in Kensington, West London. Hawkins read philosophy, politics and economics at Keble College, University of Oxford. She worked as a journalist for The Times, reporting on business. She then worked for a number of publications on a freelance basis, and wrote a financial-advice book for women, The Money Goddess.

Around 2009, Hawkins began to write romantic comedy fiction under the alias Amy Silver, writing four novels including Confessions of a Reluctant Recessionista.

She did not achieve a commercial breakthrough until she challenged herself to write a darker, more serious story. Her best-selling novel The Girl on the Train (2015) is a complex thriller, with themes of domestic violence, alcohol, and drug abuse. The novel took her six months, writing full-time, to complete, at a time when she was in a difficult financial situation and had to borrow from her father. The novel was adapted into a film in 2016. In November 2016, she was listed as one of BBC's 100 Women. Paula's second thriller Into The Water was published in May 2017 and went on to become a Sunday Times and NYT bestseller. Her novel A Slow Fire Burning was published on 31 August 2021.

== Published works ==
- The Money Goddess: The Complete Financial Makeover (2006) (Paula Hawkins)
- Guerrilla Learning: How to Give Your Kids a Real Education With or Without School (2001) (with co-author Grace Llewellyn) (ISBN 978-0-471-34960-0)
- Confessions of a Reluctant Recessionista (2009) (Amy Silver) ISBN 9780099543558
- All I Want for Christmas (2010) (Amy Silver) ISBN 9780099553229
- One Minute to Midnight (2011) (Amy Silver) ISBN 9780099564638
- The Reunion (2013) (Amy Silver) ISBN 9780099574491
- The Girl on the Train (2015) (Paula Hawkins) ISBN 9781594634024
- Into the Water (2017) (Paula Hawkins) ISBN 9780735211209
- A Slow Fire Burning (2021) (Paula Hawkins) ISBN 9780735211230
- Blind Spot (2022) (Paula Hawkins) ISBN 9781529176636
- The Blue Hour (2024) (Paula Hawkins) ISBN 9781529938074
