= Law firms in fiction =

Law firms are a common element of fictional depictions of legal practice. In legal drama, generally, they create opportunities to depict lawyers engaged in dramatic interactions that are reflective of the real-world drama of the profession. The portrayal of law firms varies by the media in which they are presented, with law firms in novels and in films (many of which are simply adaptations of the novels) being presented in a negative light, while law firms in television series tending to be presented more positively.

== In books and film ==
The opposing large law firm is a standard villain in legal thrillers and trial films alike. In 2001, UCLA law professor Michael Asimow wrote:

Movies accurately reflect the public's dismal opinion of law firms. During the seventy years of the sound era, filmmakers have often presented lawyers in solo practice as decent human beings and as excellent lawyers, although that is much less true in the last thirty years than in the first forty. Once movie lawyers join together into law firms, however, they are portrayed quite negatively, regardless of the era. In film, lawyers who practice in small law firms are worse than solo lawyers, and big firms are much worse than small firms. Judging by what we are taught in the movies, lawyers in firms (especially large ones) are miserable, bigoted, materialistic people. Despite their wealth and beautiful cars and homes, they have mostly unhappy personal lives and dysfunctional families. As lawyers, they are greedy, heartless, predatory, unethical, and often buffoonish or incompetent.

Because of this perception, law firms are readily represented as places of intrigue and deception, with modern portrayals that "extend from the surreal to the diabolical". Asimow notes that these portrayals have real legal significance because "stories about law, lawyers, or the legal system in film, television, or print" are the vehicle by which "the public learns most of what it thinks it knows about law, lawyers and the legal system".

Although the first film specifically about a law firm, the 1933 film Counsellor at Law, portrays the fictional New York City law firm of Simon & Tedesco as an upstanding practice populated by attorneys who are good-hearted (if occasionally lapsing in their ethical conduct), this type of entity was thereafter typically portrayed on film as a villainous enterprise.

John Grisham, in particular, has displayed a penchant for portraying large firms as evil entities, contrasted against heroic solo practitioners, small firm attorneys, law students, and against their own more ethical young associates.

== In television ==
Fictional law firms that serve as the backdrop for television shows tend to be portrayed in a more sympathetic light. Asimow wrote that it is "striking how much more favorably law firms are portrayed on dramatic television series than in film". This is reflected in the earliest television series depicting a law firm, The Defenders which revolved around the father and son firm of Preston & Preston. Other sympathetic portrayals are found in L.A. Law, Ally McBeal, and The Practice, and Will & Grace (which is not centered on a law firm, but prominently depicts one in several episodes as a title character's place of employment). Each of these shows depict a mid-size firm, rather than an office of a very large firm, and each depicts attorneys employed by the firm as having very different legal specialties and temperaments. These positive portrayals, however, do not extend to larger firms.

Many television programs having law firms at their core have been written or created by David E. Kelley, himself a Boston University School of Law graduate who had worked for a Boston law firm. Kelley was a writer for L.A. Law, and created Ally McBeal, The Practice, and Boston Legal, and also scripted the film, From the Hip, a legal thriller that centered some acerbic attention on the machinations of the lead character's law firm.

== List ==
This list contains notable fictional law firms, being those that exist only as an integral part of a notable work of fiction. They are categorized by the media in which the firm was first introduced.

=== From books ===
- Agee, Poe & Epps, New York law firm in The Associate by John Grisham
- Baker Potts, San Francisco law firm in The Associate by John Grisham
- Bendini, Lambert & Locke from The Firm by John Grisham
- Boone & Boone, in Theodore Boone: Kid Lawyer by John Grisham
- Blackwood & Price, in Saving Max by Antoinette van Heugten
- Brim, Stearns, and Kidlow, DC law firm in The Pelican Brief by John Grisham
- The Law Offices of J. Clay Carter II in The King of Torts by John Grisham
- Conyers & Dean in the four legal novels of Arthur R. G. Solmssen
- Dennard & McShane, Washington, D.C. law film in The Impeachment of Abraham Lincoln by Steven L. Carter
- Dewey, Cheetham & Howe from J R by William Gaddis
- Dodson & Fogg in Bleak House by Charles Dickens
- Drake & Sweeny from The Street Lawyer by John Grisham
- Durban & Lang, New York firm in John Grisham's short story "Fish Files"
- Dunn & McCrory, Los Angeles, California law firm from Columbo: The Grassy Knoll by William Harrington
- Findley and Baker, Memphis law firm in The Client by John Grisham
- Finley & Figg, in The Litigators by John Grisham
- The Flak Law Firm, Texas family-run firm in The Confession by John Grisham
- Ganganelli, Pecci, Peretti from A Frolic of His Own by William Gaddis
- Garton, London law firm in The Associate by John Grisham
- Graham Douglas & Wilkins, Toronto law firm in Jeffrey Archer's short story "Christina Rosenthal"
- The Law Offices of Harry Rex Vonner in John Grisham's short story "Fish Files"
- Haskins, Haskins & Purbright, law firm in Jeffrey Archer's short story "Where There's a Will"
- The Law Offices of Jacob McKinley Stafford, LLC, in John Grisham's short story "Fish Files"
- The Law Offices of John L. McAvoy in The Associate by John Grisham
- Logan & Kupec, New York law firm in The Associate by John Grisham
- Lomax, Davis and Lomax, firm of solicitors in Jeffrey Archer's short story "The Loophole"
- Michelin Chiz & Associates, Pennsylvania law firm in The Associate by John Grisham
- Morecombe, Slant and Honeyplace from the Discworld novels by Terry Pratchett
- Myers & O'Malley, "...the oldest law firm in D.C..." in The King of Torts by John Grisham
- Rosato & Associates from various novels by Lisa Scottoline
- Salitieri, Poore, Nash, De Brutus and Short from Gravity's Rainbow by Thomas Pynchon
- Scully & Pershing, New York law firm in The Associate by John Grisham; also in "Camino Island" by John Grisham (Paris branch)
- Slow and Bideawhile, London law firm in The Way We Live Now and other novels by Anthony Trollope
- Sullivan & O'Hare, Clanton firm in A Time to Kill by John Grisham
- Walker-Stearns, New York law firm in The King of Torts by John Grisham
- Warpe, Wistfull, Kubitschek and McMingus from The Crying of Lot 49 by Thomas Pynchon
- White and Blazevich, DC law firm in The Pelican Brief by John Grisham
- Wilbanks & Wilbanks, Clanton firm in A Time to Kill by John Grisham

=== From films ===
- Altman, Altman, & Altman from The Angriest Man in Brooklyn
- Arnell, Delano & Strauss from Changing Lanes
- Churchill, Harline & Smith from Enchanted
- Ducksworth, Saver & Gross from The Mighty Ducks
- Hungerdunger, Hungerdunger, Hungerdunger, Hungerdunger & McCormick from Animal Crackers
- Kenner, Bach & Ledeen from Michael Clayton
- Milton, Chadwick & Waters from The Devil's Advocate
- O'Brien, Thompson, and Kincaid from The Fortune Cookie
- Patton, Shaw & Lord from Absolute Power (1996)
- Sheffield & Associates from Scarface
- Simon & Tedesco from Counsellor at Law
- Webster, Webster & Cohen from Cool Runnings
- Wyant Wheeler Hellerman Tetlow and Brown from Philadelphia

=== From television shows ===
- 3 Equity Court, the address of the otherwise unnamed law firm of Rumpole of the Bailey and related books etc.
- Babip, Vorp, Pecota & Eckstein from Parks and Recreation
- Barr, Robinovitch & Tchobanian from Street Legal
- Bass and Marshall from The Associates
- Cage, Fish and Associates from Ally McBeal
- Crane, Constable, McNeil & Montero from Century City
- Crane, Poole & Schmidt from Boston Legal
- Dewey, Cheathem & Livingstone from 30 Rock
- Doucette and Stein from Will & Grace
- Fagen & Harrison from Billable Hours
- Feline Feline & Hairball from MADtv
- Firth, Wynn, & Meyer from The Fresh Prince of Bel-Air (Will Smith humorously compares them to Earth, Wind & Fire in the pilot episode)
- Florrick Agos from The Good Wife
- Franklin and Franklin from Franklin and Bash
- Gage Whitney Pace (aka "Gage Whitney") from the Aaron Sorkin series The West Wing, Studio 60 on the Sunset Strip, as well as the January 12, 2009, episode of 24 and the 2017 film Molly's Game.
- Gosset, Harper & Long from The Good Wife
- Greenberg & Greenberg from Jimmy Kimmel Live!
- Grey & Associates from Kevin Hill
- Gublin & Green from Saturday Night Live
- Hackey, Joake & Dunnit from The Simpsons
- Hamlin, Hamlin & McGill from Better Call Saul
- Hewes and Associates from Damages
- Hoffman and Associates (later "Wyler and Associates") from Murder One
- I Can't Believe It's a Law Firm! - from The Simpsons
- Infeld Daniels from Franklin & Bash
- Jackman, Carter and Clein - Charmed
- Jeryn Hogarth & Associates (previously Hogarth Chao & Benowitz) from Jessica Jones, Daredevil and Iron Fist
- Kingdom & Kingdom (later "Kingdom & Anderson") from Kingdom
- Laura Strike-DePalma & Associates from NCIS
- Levy, Saunderson and Brown from Brookside
- Litt Wheeler Williams Bennett (originally Gordon Schmidt Van Dyke, later rebranded as Pearson Hardman, Pearson Darby, Pearson Specter, Pearson Specter Litt, Zane Specter Litt, Specter Litt Wheeler Williams then Specter Litt Williams) from Suits
- Lockhart Gardner (previously Stern, Lockhart and Gardner, then Lockhart, Gardner and Bond) from The Good Wife
- Lotus, Spackman & Phelps from Is It Legal?
- Luvem and Burnem Family Law from The Simpsons
- Matlock & Matlock (later "Matlock & Thomas" and then "Matlock & MacIntyre") from Matlock
- McKenzie, Brackman, Cheney, and Kuzak (later "McKenzie, Brackman, Cheney, Kuzak, and Becker", then "McKenzie, Brackman, Cheney, and Becker"; informally "McKenzie Brackman") from L.A. Law
- Morelli & Kaczmarek from The Defenders
- Nelson and Murdock, Attorneys at Law from Daredevil
- Landman & Zack LLP from Daredevil
- Oompa Loompa and Golden from MADtv
- Pearson Hardman from Suits
- Rabinowitz, Rabinowitz, and Rabinowitz from All in the Family
- Rebecchi-Cammeniti from Neighbours
- Reddick, Boseman, & Kolstad from The Good Fight
- Reed & Reed from Fairly Legal
- Robert Donnell and Associates (later Donnell, Young, Dole and Frutt and then Young, Frutt and Berluti) from The Practice
- Russell & Tate from Saturday Night Live
- Saul Goodman & Associates from Breaking Bad
- Sterling, Huddle, Oppenheim, & Craft - The Deep End
- Stuart, Whitehead and Moore from Neighbours
- Sebben & Sebben from Harvey Birdman, Attorney at Law
- Sagman, Bennett, Robbins, Oppenheim & Taff from Seinfeld
- Tim Collins and Associates from Neighbours
- Vitale, Horowitz, Riordan, Schrecter, Schrecter, and Schrecter - Daria
- Wakefield-Cady from Suits
- Wethersby, Posner, and Klein (later two firms: Wethersby & Stone and Posner & Klein) from Eli Stone
- Whitcomb, Wiley, Hawking, Harrison and Kendall from The West Wing
- Wolfram & Hart from Angel
- Wolfram, Hart and Donowitz from NCIS
- Young and Knott, Legal from The Increasingly Poor Decisions of Todd Margaret

=== From unknown or miscellaneous sources ===
- Delio & Furax, from Grand Theft Auto: Vice City, a video game
- Dewey, Cheatem & Howe, referred to by the Three Stooges, Groucho Marx, Daffy Duck, Leisure Suit Larry III, Car Talk, and many others
- Flywheel, Shyster, and Flywheel, radio vehicle for the Marx Brothers in the 1930s
- Larsen E. Pettifogger, from the comic strip, The Wizard of Id
- Nelson & Murdock, from Daredevil comic books
- Partnership Collective from the webcomic Schlock Mercenary
- Roper, Bender & Raper, from Frank Zappa's Thing-Fish album
- Sue, Grabbit & Runne, featured regularly in Private Eye magazine
- Sue, Cripple & Sneer, featured in Frontier: Elite 2, a video game
- Wright & Co. (previously Fey & Co.), from Phoenix Wright: Ace Attorney, a video game
- Wolff & Byrd, attorneys of the Macabre from the comic books of the same name
- Themis Law Firm, from the mobile game Tears of Themis
- Baldr Legal Office, from the mobile game Tears of Themis
- Keogh & Barriere, from the mobile game Identity V
