= Publishers Weekly list of bestselling novels in the United States in the 2010s =

This is a list of bestselling novels in the United States in the 2010s, as determined by Publishers Weekly. The list features the most popular novels of each year from 2010 through to 2019.

The standards set for inclusion in the lists – which, for example, led to the exclusion of the novels in the Harry Potter series from the lists for the 1990s and 2000s – are currently unknown. After 2012, Publishers Weekly used the lists from Nielsen BookScan for print, supplemented by the Amazon.com lists for Kindle and print. Some of the lists of print bestsellers have combined the different formats of books into one list. Books that are not novels will be excluded when possible, especially nonfiction books.

According to Nielsen BookScan data, the Fifty Shades series is the top three best selling books of the decade, with the first novel selling 15.2 million copies from 2010 to 2019. The Hunger Games (2008) was fourth (8.7 million copies) followed by The Help (2009) (8.7 million).

== 2010 ==
1. The Girl Who Kicked the Hornet's Nest by Stieg Larsson
2. The Confession by John Grisham
3. The Help by Kathryn Stockett
4. Safe Haven by Nicholas Sparks
5. Dead or Alive by Tom Clancy
6. Sizzling Sixteen by Janet Evanovich
7. Cross Fire by James Patterson
8. Freedom by Jonathan Franzen
9. Port Mortuary by Patricia Cornwell
10. Full Dark, No Stars by Stephen King

== 2011 ==
1. The Litigators by John Grisham
2. 11/22/63 by Stephen King
3. The Best of Me by Nicholas Sparks
4. Smokin' Seventeen by Janet Evanovich
5. A Dance with Dragons by George R. R. Martin
6. Explosive Eighteen by Janet Evanovich
7. Kill Alex Cross by James Patterson
8. Micro by Michael Crichton
9. Dead Reckoning by Charlaine Harris
10. Locked On by Tom Clancy and Mark Greaney

== 2012 ==
1. Fifty Shades of Grey by E. L. James
2. The Hunger Games by Suzanne Collins
3. Fifty Shades Darker by E. L. James
4. Fifty Shades Freed by E. L. James
5. Catching Fire by Suzanne Collins
6. Mockingjay by Suzanne Collins
7. Diary of a Wimpy Kid: The Third Wheel by Jeff Kinney
8. Fifty Shades trilogy box set by E. L. James
9. The Mark of Athena by Rick Riordan
10. Gone Girl by Gillian Flynn

== 2013 ==
1. Diary of a Wimpy Kid: Hard Luck by Jeff Kinney
2. Inferno by Dan Brown
3. The House of Hades by Rick Riordan
4. Divergent by Veronica Roth
5. Sycamore Row by John Grisham
6. Diary of a Wimpy Kid: The Third Wheel by Jeff Kinney
7. Allegiant by Veronica Roth
8. The Fault in Our Stars by John Green
9. Doctor Sleep by Stephen King
10. The Great Gatsby by F. Scott Fitzgerald

== 2014 ==
1. The Fault in Our Stars (trade paperback) by John Green
2. Diary of a Wimpy Kid: The Long Haul by Jeff Kinney
3. Divergent by Veronica Roth
4. Insurgent by Veronica Roth
5. Killing Patton by Bill O'Reilly
6. Allegiant by Veronica Roth
7. Gone Girl by Gillian Flynn
8. The Fault in Our Stars (movie tie-in) by John Green
9. The Fault in Our Stars (hardcover) by John Green
10. Frozen by Victoria Saxon

== 2015 ==
1. Go Set a Watchman by Harper Lee
2. Grey by E. L. James
3. The Girl on the Train by Paula Hawkins
4. All the Light We Cannot See by Anthony Doerr
5. The Martian (trade paper) by Andy Weir
6. Rogue Lawyer by John Grisham
7. To Kill a Mockingbird by Harper Lee
8. See Me by Nicholas Sparks
9. Gray Mountain by John Grisham
10. The Nightingale by Kristin Hannah

== 2016 ==
1. The Girl on the Train (trade paperback) by Paula Hawkins
2. A Man Called Ove by Fredrik Backman
3. The Whistler by John Grisham
4. Me Before You (trade paperback) by Jojo Moyes
5. Me Before You (movie tie-in) by Jojo Moyes
6. Two by Two by Nicholas Sparks
7. The Girl on the Train by Paula Hawkins (movie tie-in)
8. To Kill a Mockingbird by Harper Lee
9. Me Before You (movie tie-in) by Jojo Moyes
10. All the Light We Cannot See by Anthony Doerr

== 2017 ==
1. Wonder by R.J. Palacio
2. Milk and Honey by Rupi Kaur
3. Diary of a Wimpy Kid: The Getaway by Jeff Kinney
4. Origin by Dan Brown
5. You Are a Badass by Jen Sincero
6. A Man Called Ove by Fredrik Backman
7. Oh, the Places You'll Go! by Dr. Seuss
8. The Woman in Cabin 10 by Ruth Ware
9. The Rooster Bar by John Grisham
10. Camino Island by John Grisham

== 2018 ==
1. Diary of a Wimpy Kid: The Meltdown by Jeff Kinney
2. The Wonky Donkey by Craig Smith
3. Dog Man and Cat Kid by Dav Pilkey
4. The President Is Missing by Bill Clinton and James Patterson
5. Dog Man by Dav Pilkey
6. A Wrinkle in Time by Madeleine L’Engle
7. Crazy Rich Asians by Kevin Kwan
8. The Reckoning by John Grisham
9. A Day in the Life of Marlon Bundo by Jill Twiss
10. Oh, the Places You'll Go! by Dr. Seuss

== 2019 ==
1. Where the Crawdads Sing by Delia Owens
2. Dog Man: For Whom the Ball Rolls by Dav Pilkey
3. Diary of a Wimpy Kid: Wrecking Ball by Jeff Kinney
4. Dog Man: Brawl of the Wild by Dav Pilkey
5. Diary of an Awesome Friendly Kid by Jeff Kinney
6. The Tattooist of Auschwitz by Heather Morris
7. Dog Man: Fetch 22 by Dav Pilkey
8. The Guardians by John Grisham
9. The Institute by Stephen King
10. Guts by Raina Telgemeier
