= Ford County (short story collection) =

2009 novella collection by John Grisham

- First edition cover
- Author: John Grisham
- Language: English
- Genre: novel
- Publisher: Doubleday
- Publication date: November 3, 2009
- Publication place: United States
- Media type: Print (hardcover)
- Pages: 272
- ISBN: 978-0-385-53245-7
- OCLC: 317926293
- Dewey Decimal: 813/.54 22
- LC Class: PS3557.R5355 F67 2009
- Preceded by: The Associate

Ford County is a collection of novellas by John Grisham. His first collection of stories, it was published by Doubleday in the United States in 2009.

The book contains 7 short stories or novellas: "Blood Drive"; "Fetching Raymond"; "Fish Files"; "Casino"; "Michael's Room"; "Quiet Haven"; and "Funny Boy".

== Plot summaries ==
=== "Blood Drive" ===
A young man named Bailey is injured in a construction accident in Memphis. His plight is publicized and three young men–Aggie, Calvin and Roger–decide to drive there to donate blood to him. Roger, an alcoholic, insists they stop at a gas station so he can purchase beer; he tells several stories about Memphis strip clubs, stimulating Aggie and Calvin's curiosity. They are nearly arrested for drunk driving by a sheriff's deputy and nearly shot by a homeowner. Arriving in Memphis, the three decide to hit up one of Roger's favorite strip clubs before donating their blood. Calvin falls in love with a stripper named Amber and takes her seriously when she calls him "cute".

Drinking too much and unable to make their way around the city, the men eventually sell their blood at a nearby blood bank, having forgotten where Bailey is being treated. After passing out in the pickup, Roger awakens during a shootout between gangs and flees with a pistol he found under the pickup's seat. While pursued, Roger encounters a man and woman fighting next to a car and rescues the woman. She takes his gun and holds him hostage as he drives the car away. Aggie and Calvin return to find their pickup riddled with bullet holes. They return to the strip club to spend the fifty dollars apiece they received from the blood bank.

A Memphis Police Department vice squad springs a raid on the strip club, and Aggie and Calvin are injured in the resulting riot. Back home, the families who had gathered together in support of Bailey must send additional people to Memphis to bail the trio out of jail and see to Aggie's medical care, as he has suffered a concussion far more severe than Bailey's injury.

=== "Fetching Raymond" ===
The middle-aged brothers Butch and Leon - respectively a habitual car thief and a more or less reformed criminal - retrieve their mother Inez. They set out in a borrowed van for the notorious Parchman prison, where their younger brother Raymond is on death row for murdering a Deputy. En route the brothers and their mother start bickering. Gradually it becomes clear that they are not bound on normal prison visit. Raymond is about to be executed.

Raymond is a prolific writer who has delusions of grandeur, as well as delusions of success in his numerous legal appeals. He claims to have scores of lawyers ready to exonerate him and who are filing motions and briefs in all directions. Raymond had gone through intellectual phases of religion (or atheism), diet, exercise, music, and literature. He wrote nine bulky books, using sophisticated words which his family does not understand - but in fact no publisher wanted them.

When his family arrives, Raymond still appears to go through manic episodes and still hopes for a last-minute reprieve. But when the delusion is shattered, with the Warden coming to take Raymond to the gas chamber, he accepts his execution calmly.

Raymond has a final hug with his mother, who accepts a sedative offered by the warden. The two brothers watch Raymond's last moments, when he manages dignified final words and asks the forgiveness of his victim's family.

Afterward, Raymond's coffin is loaded on the van. Immediately on arrival at their hometown, he is buried in a grave that was prepared by a backhoe. The family holds no real funeral, as they are unpopular with their neighbors. Afterward, Butch stays with their mother and Leon returns to work, as he can't afford to miss a day.

=== "Fish Files" ===
Among the 50 lawyers in a small town of 10,000 people is the protagonist of this story. He is another "ham-and-egger" local attorney, dealing with minor bankruptcies, deeds, divorces, personal injuries, and other matters. Some of his files are the eponymous ones of the title; he has let them to go untouched for so long that clients forget they ever retained him (and the cases "go bad" like untouched fish). The attorney is tired of his mediocre life and feels unappreciated by his family.

One day he gets a call out of the blue from a New York attorney at a prestigious firm, claiming to have been retained by the European purchaser of a chainsaw manufacturer. The Europeans, the New York attorney claims, are terrified of the American system of tort law and want to settle any old cases from the chainsaw company. The "fish files" contain the cases of four loggers who were injured, and the New York attorney offers $100,000 per each case, plus an additional $100,000 for court costs. The local lawyer's take is 40%, and he is ecstatic.

Deciding to flee from his unpleasant life, he fires his secretary, declares bankruptcy, and divorces his wife. He offers $25,000 to the two loggers he finds of the original four - who are happy to get anything at all and don't realize that their lawyer has stolen most of the money due to them - and makes no real effort to trace the other two. The protagonist then departs serenely for life of pleasant leisure in the Caribbean.

=== "Casino" ===
Stella is 48 years old and has been married for years to Sidney, a small-town accountant. She cannot remember why they fell in love in the first place, and their lives have become dull with no romance or excitement. Sidney is distraught when Stella files for divorce. When she leaves him, their college-age daughter sides with her mother, further damaging Sidney's psyche.

Bobby Carl Leach is a local playboy who owns numerous investments and has an infamous reputation. He intends to manipulate the local history of Native Americans and its associated law of tribal affairs, claiming descent of the Yazoo tribe through his great-grandfather. A Yazoo activist from the county, Chief Larry, befriends Leach and agrees to enter into a deal to receive lots of land from Leach for his newly regrouped Yazoo Nation. In return, the land is largely developed as a casino under the protection of federal law, rendering it untouchable by outraged local and state authorities. (In fact the Yazoo tribe, which used to inhabit large parts of the present state of Mississippi, was decimated in 18th wars with French settlers and with other tribes. It ceased to exist as an identifiable social group.)

Stella falls in with Leach and becomes his secretary and girlfriend.

Sidney, meanwhile, plans to win Stella back. Unable to find her, he begins gambling at the newly opened Yazoo casino and discovers that he has considerable talent at blackjack. Soon he is winning thousands of dollars nightly. He quits his job as an accountant to become a full-time, professional gambler. Discovering that Stella is with Leach and works at the local casino, he hatches a plan.

The first night, dressed as a wannabe biker, he wins $184,000 at blackjack and demands cash, which is reluctantly paid. As is their right, the casino asks him not to return. The second night, he comes in a different disguise, and wins more than $600,000. He is asked to leave and demands payment, giving them his real driver's license. The casino cannot pay his winnings and he sues.

The courts side with Sidney, and Leach and the casino have no choice but to pay up and declare bankruptcy. Stella, having been fired and dumped by Leach as soon as he found out that she was Sidney's ex-wife, begs Sidney to take her back. Victoriously, he does so - though on his own terms, neglecting to marry her again and taking her with him on his new life of nationwide wandering from casino to casino.

Grisham took up the issue of Native American gaming, at greater length and depth, in his novel The Whistler (2016).

=== "Michael's Room" ===
Stanley Wade is an attorney who is kidnapped at a convenience store by an imposing working-class man and his teenage son and driven into the wilds in the man's old pickup truck. At gunpoint, Wade is forced to walk down a deserted road with the man after the truck drops them off. The road leads to a ramshackle house, and in the back out the house is eleven-year-old Michael Cranwell, who is severely developmentally disabled.

Wade had represented the doctor who apparently caused Michael's extensive birth defects, due to incompetence and potential intoxication. During the course of the trial, Wade insisted that the doctor was a great and caring man, dismissing Michael and mocking the evidence of malpractice.

Wade is forced to listen to pages of the trial transcript read to him by Mr. Cranwell and begins to feel remorse for his actions and those of his guilty clients. Instead of killing him, Cranwell drops Wade back at the convenience store parking lot, allowing him to go home. He claims he will leave Wade alone until Michael dies, filling the attorney with dread.

=== "Quiet Haven" ===
A man begins work at a local nursing home as a low-paid orderly despite a clean record and an age of 34. He reveals, as the narrator, that he has falsified his resume to exclude his extensive educational background, claiming a high school diploma when he has actually completed graduate school. As an orderly he begins gathering rumors and searching for evidence of malfeasance and medical malpractice, befriending both employees and residents to earn their trust and learn their gossip. He befriends one resident in particular - an elderly man who has a penchant for seducing female residents (and even non-residents). Eventually, the man begins taking this resident outside the nursing home for activities, including visiting Civil War battlefields.

Later, the man gives the resident Playboy issues (pornography is banned for residents) and introduces him to his elderly landlady, making the resident very happy indeed. They continue to bond over their love of history.

It is revealed that the resident actually owns considerable amounts of land, most of which he has forgotten. Also, the resident has no will. The resident's family has essentially abandoned him, meaning the new orderly is his only friend.

One night a female resident is injured in a fall in her room while the nursing home is understaffed. The orderly is on duty and assists in her rescue. While an ambulance is on its way, he photographs everything, getting hard evidence of the nursing home's negligent operations.

As lawsuits are filed, the orderly quits his job. It is revealed that he will receive a percentage of the impending settlement from the company that owns the chain of nursing homes, presumably as a "finder's fee" for discovering a ripe legal case. Also, the Civil War-loving resident has decided to leave his holdings to a Civil War heritage preservation charity...which is secretly controlled by the orderly. When the outraged family of the resident discovers this, they will quickly buy the land back at 1/4 price to avoid being mocked in the press for abandoning the resident.

In the end, the "orderly," having made roughly $50,000 in a few months, returns home for a vacation before plotting his next target.

=== "Funny Boy" ===
In the mid-1980s, AIDS is virtually unknown in Ford County, and there is a strong prejudice and ignorant belief that it highly contagious. The outcast son of a prominent local family is dying from AIDS and is returning home from San Francisco, not wanting his friends in California to have to watch him die. The family does not want the son to be near them and makes a deal with an elderly black spinster living in one of the family's properties in the black side of town: Take care of the dying son and the house is yours, free and clear. The young man and the old lady live together and become close friends even as the entire town - whites and blacks alike - comes to resent them both out of fear, ignorance, and bigotry. She reveals to him that she is herself a deeply repressed Lesbian - a secret she never before shared with anyone. She continues to support him even after her church asks her to take a "leave of absence" until after the young man has died. In the end, he commits suicide to end his suffering, leaving a note declaring his new friend to be the best human being he has ever known.

== Other novels set in Ford County ==
Grisham's books, A Time to Kill, The Summons, The Chamber, The Last Juror, The Reckoning, Sycamore Row, A Time for Mercy and Sparring Partners also take place here. From evidence in Sycamore Row, the fictional Ford County is in northwest Mississippi.
