= The Litigators =

Novel by John Grisham

- First edition (US)
- Author: John Grisham
- Language: English
- Subject: class action lawsuit, pharmaceutical drugs
- Genre: Legal thriller
- Publisher: Doubleday (US); Hodder & Stoughton (UK)
- Publication date: October 25, 2011 (hardcover); June 26, 2012 (paperback)
- Publication place: United States
- Media type: Hardcover, Paperback, Audiobook and E-book
- Pages: 385 (Hardcover 1st edition)
- ISBN: 978-0-385-53513-7
- Preceded by: The Confession
- Followed by: Calico Joe

The Litigators is a 2011 legal thriller novel by John Grisham, his 25th fiction novel overall. The Litigators is about a two-partner Chicago law firm attempting to strike it rich in a class action lawsuit over a cholesterol reduction drug by a major pharmaceutical drug company. The protagonist is a Harvard Law School grad big law firm burnout who stumbles upon the boutique and joins it only to find himself litigating against his old law firm in this case. The book is regarded as more humorous than most of Grisham's prior novels.

Critical reviews were mixed for the book, with several opinions noting a lack of suspense. Nonetheless, the book has achieved both hardcover and ebook #1 best seller status on various lists, including both The New York Times and The Wall Street Journal. However, since some services do not separate fiction and non-fiction books, it did not debut as a #1 bestseller on certain lists, such as the USA Today. Some reviewers noted that this story would lend itself to an adapted screenplay.

== Background ==
Having sold 250 million copies of his previous 24 novels in 29 languages, Grisham had produced an international bestseller with each prior book. Including the release of The Litigators, Grisham has produced 23 adult fiction novels and 2 children's fiction novels as well as a short story collection. In addition, he has produced one non-fiction book.

In the first of a two-part interview with The Wall Street Journal, Grisham claimed that although he usually attempts to include humor in his submitted drafts, it is usually removed during the editorial process. However, in this case much of the humor survived editing. In the second part of the interview the following week, Grisham noted that his inspirations for the book included television advertisements and the Deepwater Horizon oil spill.

== Plot ==
Oscar Finley and Wally Figg are ambulance chasers at a small law firm in the South Side of Chicago. Their constant bickering is often mediated by Rochelle, their highly competent African-American secretary. Meanwhile, David Zinc, a Harvard Law School graduate, is completely fed up with the grinding and dehumanizing – though well-paid – life of an associate in the high-powered law firm of Rogan Rothberg. David suddenly breaks away, goes on a drinking binge and by chance finds himself at the Finley & Figg office, where he willingly relegates himself to working for the two disreputable street lawyers.

Wally gets involved in a new scheme, finding claimants for a federal class action lawsuit against Krayoxx, a cholesterol-lowering drug developed by the fictional pharmaceutical company Varrick Labs. Users across the country, both dead and alive, appear to have developed toxic reactions to the drug. Though the firm is out of its depth, Wally gains the assurance of a South Florida lawyer, Jerry Alisandros, that Alisandros will handle the case and reach an out-of-court settlement, and everybody will get rich. However, complications that no one anticipated arise, including Varrick's hiring of Nadine Karros, Rogan Rothberg's ace litigator who never loses a case, and the growing evidence that there is nothing fundamentally wrong with Krayoxx. The drug works as advertised, has no ill effects, and is unjustly maligned. Varrick pushes to have the case tried in the jurisdiction of Chicago federal judge Harry Seawright, with whom Rogan Rothberg has ties. The case is expedited on Seawright's docket, with Finley & Figg's claim singled out of the tort claimants. Alisandros pulls out as co-counsel, leaving Finley & Figg to litigate the case themselves. The resulting trial brings the firm's usual cast of shady witnesses to the stand in a desperate attempt to get through the trial and avoid being sued for legal malpractice and saddled with frivolous lawsuit sanctions.

In a subsidiary plot, David Zinc stumbles on a lead poisoning brain damage case involving the child of Burmese immigrants. His efforts to identify the American company which imported the child's toxic toys from China, and reach a settlement with the importer, help him survive the demise of Finley & Figg and open his own successful law firm with Rochelle as his legal secretary.

== Publication ==
Doubleday published The Litigators in hardcover format in the United States on October 25, 2011. In the United Kingdom, the book was published with different cover art by Hodder & Stoughton on the same date. Random House published the paperback version on June 26, 2012.

The Litigators is also available as an audiobook, narrated by Dennis Boutsikaris, and in ebook format. Other formats available on October 25, included large-print, compact disc and abridged compact disc. A limited edition will be available on November 22, 2011. An excerpt from the book was included in some editions including the iTunes Store edition of The Confession, which was his prior adult novel.

== Critical review ==
The Litigators is said to be "an amusing and appalling look into the machinations of a nationwide class-action suit," according to Tobin Harshaw of Bloomberg L.P. The Wall Street Journal's Christopher John Farley noted that the book is lighter than Grisham's other works. Publishers Weekly called it a "bitingly farcical look at lawyers at the bottom of the food chain". CNN described the book as an original perspective of "the best and worst the American system of justice has to offer". Louis Bayard of The Washington Post, who described himself as someone who abandoned Grisham after his first three novels, noted that this book might be a good starting point for those who have tired of Grisham. Andrea Simakis of The Plain Dealer describes the book as a "heartier meal" than Grisham's usual "potato-chip fiction". Publishers Weekly also notes that the fairy tale ending is not really in keeping with the introduction's dark humor. Rick Arthur of The United Arab Emirates publication The National describes the book unfavorably as a cross between prior Grisham works The Street Lawyer and The King of Torts and similarly describes the protagonist unfavorably to those of The Firm and The Rainmaker.

The book has been derided for its lack of suspense. Carol Memmott of USA Today says that Grisham's latest attempt to capture the spirit of the legal David and Goliath story is missing "the ratcheting-up of suspense" that he has employed successfully in recent adult and youth novels. Harshaw claims that the book is lacking in the suspense that made The Firm so successful. Arthur finds elements of the plot implausible and the story unsuspenseful as well as unsatisfying. Although the book is somewhat predictable, Bayard notes that "Grisham swerves clear of the usual melodramatic devices. Corporations aren’t intrinsically venal; plaintiffs aren’t lambent with goodness. And best of all, no one is murdered for stumbling Too Close to the Truth."

Some sources noted that the book has potential to become an adapted screenplay. Irish Independent describes Grisham's new book as "following his usual route to the bestsellers list" and projects it as a candidate to be his next Hollywood film. Although it is standard Grisham fare, Independent noted that it provides the usual thrills in Grisham's comfortable legal world and should be a gripping read for his usual fans. The Sunday Express noted that the book could be readily converted to a screenplay, but its critic, Robin Callender Smith, viewed the "ambulance chasing" ethos as a foreign thing that Brits might have to worry about in the near future.

Simakis praised the book for having more depth of character than Grisham's novels customarily do. She compares the protagonist to Mitch McDeere from The Firm and Rudy Baylor from The Rainmaker. Memmott says that most of the claimants that they find are unsympathetic, but a few are from somewhat sympathetic immigrant families. Simakis notes that Wally trades sex for legal services with one claimant. Harshaw says that the book is a bit sentimental and comparatively lacking in terms of secondary character development for Grisham. Larry Orenstein of Canada's The Globe and Mail notes that on the dramatic scale this book has instances of laugh out loud humor that make it more like Boston Legal than The Practice, which Boston Legal was spun off from.

== Commercial success ==
According to The Huffington Post, this book is the ninth best-selling fiction book of the year in 2011, while according to the USA Today this was the 16th best selling book overall in 2011. According to Amazon.com the book was the number eight overall best seller.

=== Hardcover ===
It immediately was listed as the Publishers Weekly #1 best-seller among fiction hardcover books according to Reuters. It was also listed as the #1 best-seller by The New York Times in the November 13, 2011 book review section for the week ending October 29, 2011 for Hardcover Fiction, E-Book Fiction, Combined Hardcover & Paperback Fiction, and the Combined Print and E-Book Fiction. It dropped from the #1 position in its second week on the list. It remained on the Combined Hardcover & Paperback Fiction list until the February 19, 2012 list (15 weeks) for the week ending February 4. It remained on both the Hardcover Fiction list and the Combined Print and E-Book Fiction list until the February 26 list (16 weeks) for the week ending February 11. It remained on the E-Book Fiction list until the March 11 list (18 weeks) for the week ending February 25.

The Wall Street Journal announced that on Saturday October 29, it would begin incorporating digital book sales in its best seller lists. When the book debuted in The Wall Street Journal list on November 5 for the week ending October 30, it was listed first in Hardcover Fiction, Fiction E-Books and Fiction Combined. It retained the hardcover lead the following week, but lost the other leads. After two weeks it was surpassed on the hardcover list as well. It remained on The Wall Street Journal Hardcover Fiction, Fiction E-Books and Fiction Combined best seller lists until the January 7 listing for the week ended on January 1, 2012.

The book was released the day after Walter Isaacson's biography of Steve Jobs, entitled Steve Jobs, was released by Simon & Schuster. Jobs had died on October 5 and the release date was moved forward. The Jobs book's release had been moved forward twice; It had been moved from spring 2012 to November 21 after Jobs stepped down and then to the October 24 date after his death. When The Litigators debuted on November 3 on the USA Today best-seller list, which does not separate fiction and non-fiction, it debuted at number 2 behind the Jobs book.

=== Paperback ===
It debuted at #1 on the New York Times Paperback Mass-Market Fiction Best Sellers list on July 15, 2012 (reflecting sales for the week ending June 30, 2012). The book remained at #1 until the August 12 list (reflecting sales of the week ending July 28, 2012), making a five-week run. It continued to appear on the list until the January 13, 2013 list (reflecting sales for the week ending December 29, 2012). On the USA Today list, which include fiction and non-fiction as well as hardcover and paperback, it debuted at #10 in the week of July 5, following its paperback release.
