= The Judge's List =

2021 novel by John Grisham

- Author: John Grisham
- Language: English
- Genre: Legal thriller novel
- Publisher: Doubleday
- Publication date: October 19, 2021
- Publication place: United States
- Media type: Print (hardcover, paperback)
- Pages: 368
- ISBN: 9780385546027

The Judge's List (2021) is a legal-suspense novel written by American author John Grisham, published by Doubleday on October 19, 2021.

It builds on characters introduced in Grisham's 2016 novel The Whistler, including Florida Board on Judicial Conduct investigator Lacy Stoltz.

== Plot ==
Three years after the events of The Whistler, Lacy Stolz is tired of her work as an investigator for the Florida Board on Judicial Conduct. But when a woman named Jeri Crosby nervously approaches her, Lacy discovers that a sitting judge, Ross Bannick, is a murderer. She's reluctant to get involved, but Jeri is obsessed with bringing the man to justice.

Jeri's father was one of Bannick's victims 20 years earlier, although his case has never been solved. She has studied Bannick for two decades, and has discovered other victims in the process.

While Bannick's guilt is never really in doubt, finding evidence to convict him is a much bigger challenge, because he knows the law, and is always one step ahead of law enforcement. He has a list that includes the names of all his targets who have wronged him in some way, and Lacy must help Jeri establish his guilt without either of them becoming his next victim.

At the climax of the book, Jeri is kidnapped by Bannick, but is rescued by police. Lacy and her brother Gunther force Bannick to flee. Before they can catch him, however, he overdoses at a rehab facility after mutilating his fingers with acid. Jeri manages to find Bannick's truck, which has a fingerprint that Lacy can use to prove two of Bannick's murders.

== Reception ==
The novel debuted at number one on The New York Times fiction best-seller list for the week ending October 23, 2021.

Kirkus Reviews called the novel a "shiny bauble of mayhem sure to please Grisham's many fans."
