= Van Heugten =

van Heugten is a Dutch surname. Notable people with the surname include:

- Antoinette van Heugten, American author of the 2010 novel Saving Max
- Ton van Heugten (1945–2008), Dutch sidecarcross rider
