= The Rainmaker (1997 film) =

1997 American legal drama film by Francis Ford Coppola

- Theatrical release poster
- Directed by: Francis Ford Coppola
- Screenplay by: Francis Ford Coppola
- Based on: The Rainmaker; 1995 novel by John Grisham
- Produced by: Michael Douglas; Fred Fuchs; Steven Reuther
- Starring: Matt Damon; Claire Danes; Jon Voight; Mary Kay Place; Mickey Rourke; Danny DeVito
- Cinematography: John Toll
- Edited by: Melissa Kent; Barry Malkin
- Music by: Elmer Bernstein
- Production companies: American Zoetrope; Constellation Films
- Distributed by: Paramount Pictures
- Release date: November 21, 1997
- Running time: 135 minutes
- Country: United States
- Language: English
- Budget: $40 million
- Box office: $45.9 million

The Rainmaker is a 1997 American legal drama film written and directed by Francis Ford Coppola based on John Grisham's 1995 novel of the same name. It stars Matt Damon, Claire Danes, Jon Voight, Mary Kay Place, Mickey Rourke, Danny DeVito, Danny Glover, Roy Scheider, Virginia Madsen, and Teresa Wright in her final film role.

The Rainmaker was released by Paramount Pictures on November 21, 1997. The film received positive reviews from critics and grossed $45.9 million against a $40 million budget.

== Plot ==
Recent Memphis State University Law School grad Rudy Baylor has no high-paying work prospects lined up. He takes a job at a Memphis bar where he meets the bar's owner, J. Lyman "Bruiser" Stone, who is also a ruthless but successful ambulance chaser. He hires Rudy as an associate.

Bruiser's associates only get paid by finding cases and working them up for trial. Rudy says he has cases, including an insurance bad faith matter he boasts could be worth several million in damages. Interested, Bruiser introduces Rudy to office paralegal Deck Shifflet, a former insurance adjuster of questionable ethics who has a law degree but has failed the bar exam six times. Bruiser employs him because he is resourceful, finds cases, is adept at gathering information, and has useful knowledge of the insurance industry.

Rudy has passed the Tennessee bar exam, but is not yet properly licensed to stand as an attorney. When Bruiser fails to show up for court, Rudy attempts to argue the case, but Judge Harvey Hale scolds Rudy and tells him to first get his license. Defense attorney Leo F. Drummond offers to stand for Rudy as Rudy is sworn in before the judge. Afterwards, Rudy discovers that the FBI has raided Bruiser's office, and Bruiser has disappeared.

Before fleeing, Bruiser gave Rudy and Deck $5500 each, as payment for a successful case. They pool their money to open a practice. They file suit for middle-aged couple Dot and Buddy Black, whose 22-year-old son, Donny Ray, is terminally ill with leukemia but could have been saved with a bone marrow transplant that their insurance carrier, Great Benefit, denied.

Rudy, having never argued a case in court before, now faces experienced lawyers led by Drummond from the prestigious firm Tinley Britt. In chambers, Hale tells Rudy and Drummond that he is set to dismiss the case, seeing it as a "lottery" case that slows down the judicial process. However, Hale suffers a fatal heart attack before he grants the petition for dismissal. A more sympathetic Judge Tyrone Kipler, a former civil rights attorney, replaces Hale. Kipler, known by Deck as disliking Tinley Britt, immediately denies Great Benefit's petition for dismissal. He agrees to fast-track the case so Donny Ray Black's testimony can be recorded before he dies.

While seeking new clients at the hospital, Rudy meets Kelly Riker, a victim of domestic violence, whose husband Cliff has beaten her numerous times causing her to require hospitalization. Rudy and Kelly become romantically involved. Rudy persuades Kelly to file for divorce. This eventually leads to a bloody confrontation with Cliff, resulting in Rudy nearly beating him to death. To keep Rudy from being implicated, Kelly orders Rudy to leave the house. She then kills Cliff herself, telling the police it was self-defense. Based on Cliff's long history of domestic abuse, the district attorney declines to prosecute Kelly.

Donny Ray dies days after giving a video deposition. The case goes to trial, where Drummond gets the vital testimony of Rudy's key witness, Jackie Lemanczyk, stricken from the record as it is based on a stolen manual disallowed as evidence. Nevertheless, thanks to Rudy's determination and some clandestine reference help from now Caribbean-based fugitive Bruiser (with whom Deck is connected by intermediaries), Jackie's testimony and the Great Benefit Employee Manual are finally admitted into evidence, to Drummond's dismay.

Rudy skillfully cross-examines Great Benefit's CEO, Wilfred Keeley. As part of his closing argument, he plays an emotional excerpt from Donny Ray's deposition. The jury finds for Donny Ray's family for both actual damages and enormous punitive damages that Great Benefit cannot pay. It is a great triumph for Rudy and Deck, with Keeley being arrested by the FBI and investigation proceedings into Great Benefit launched in multiple jurisdictions. The insurance company declares bankruptcy, allowing it to avoid paying punitive damages. There is no payout for the grieving parents and no fee for Rudy or Drummond. Dot expresses satisfaction at putting Great Benefit out of business, leaving the company unable to victimize other families.

As this success will create unrealistic expectations for future clients, Rudy decides to abandon his new practice and become a law teacher. He and Kelly leave town together.

== Cast ==
- Matt Damon as Rudy S. Baylor
- Danny DeVito as Deck Shifflet
- Claire Danes as Kelly Riker
- Jon Voight as Leo F. Drummond
- Mary Kay Place as Margarine "Dot" Black
- Dean Stockwell as Judge Harvey Hale
- Teresa Wright as Colleen Janice "Miss Birdie" Birdsong
- Virginia Madsen as Jackie Lemanczyk
- Mickey Rourke as J. Lyman "Bruiser" Stone
- Andrew Shue as Cliff Riker
- Red West as Buddy Black
- Johnny Whitworth as Donny Ray Black
- Roy Scheider as Wilfred Keeley
- Randy Travis as Billy Porter
- Danny Glover as Judge Tyrone Kipler (uncredited)

== Production ==
In January 1995, prior to its publication, The Rainmaker was already attracting substantial interest due to the $6 million sale for the rights to John Grisham's A Time to Kill from the previous year. Later that same month, an early version of the manuscript had leaked to Hollywood studios sparking a rumor that a junior executive tasked with reading the book advised the studio to pass on acquiring the rights. Grisham and his literary agent, Jay Garon, were both infuriated by the leak with Garon saying "If there is a script floating around, then it is unauthorized, illegal, highly unethical, and we don’t want to deal with people who sneak scripts." The rights for The Rainmaker were acquired by producer Steven Reuther at Paramount Pictures. While waiting for a flight, Francis Ford Coppola read The Rainmaker and was impressed by its inspirational story which led to Coppola and Fred Fuchs of American Zoetrope approaching Reuther and voicing their interests in working on the film. Reportedly Coppola worked directly with Grisham on the first cut of the film.

== Release ==
=== Box office ===
On its opening weekend, the film ranked third behind Anastasia and Mortal Kombat Annihilation with $10.6 million. The film went on to gross $45.9 million in the domestic box office, exceeding its estimated production budget of $40 million, but still was considered a disappointment for a film adaptation of a Grisham novel, particularly in comparison to The Firm, which was made for roughly the same amount but grossed more than six times its budget.

=== Critical response ===
On the review aggregator website Rotten Tomatoes, 82% of 60 critics' reviews are positive. The website's consensus reads: "Invigorated by its talented cast and Francis Ford Coppola's strong direction, The Rainmaker is a satisfying legal drama—and arguably the best of Hollywood's many John Grisham adaptations." Metacritic, which uses a weighted average, assigned the film a score of 72 out of 100, based on 19 critics, indicating "generally favorable" reviews. Audiences polled by CinemaScore gave the film an average grade of "A−" on an A+ to F scale.

Roger Ebert gave The Rainmaker three stars out of four, remarking: "I have enjoyed several of the movies based on Grisham novels ... but I've usually seen the storyteller's craft rather than the novelist's art being reflected. ... By keeping all of the little people in focus, Coppola shows the variety of a young lawyer's life, where every client is necessary and most of them need a lot more than a lawyer." James Berardinelli also gave the film three stars out of four, saying that "the intelligence and subtlety of The Rainmaker took me by surprise" and that the film "stands above any other filmed Grisham adaptation".

=== Accolades ===
==== Nominations ====
Blockbuster Entertainment Awards

- Favorite Actor – Drama (Matt Damon)
- Favorite Supporting Actor – Drama (Danny DeVito)
- Favorite Supporting Actress – Drama (Claire Danes)

Golden Globe Awards

- Best Supporting Actor (Jon Voight)

NAACP Image Awards

- Best Supporting Actor – Motion Picture (Danny Glover)

Satellite Awards

- Best Supporting Actor – Motion Picture Drama (Danny DeVito)

USC Scripter Award

- USC Scripter Award (John Grisham and Francis Ford Coppola)

==== Other honors ====
The film is recognized by American Film Institute in these lists:

- 2008: AFI's 10 Top 10:
  - Nominated Courtroom Drama Film
