= Theodore Boone: The Scandal =

2016 book by John Grisham

- First edition (US)
- Author: John Grisham
- Language: English
- Genre: Legal thriller, young adult
- Publisher: E. P. Dutton (US); Hodder & Stoughton (UK)
- Publication date: May 10, 2016
- Publication place: United States
- ISBN: 978-0-525-42639-4
- Preceded by: Theodore Boone: The Fugitive
- Followed by: Theodore Boone: The Accomplice

Theodore Boone: The Scandal is the sixth book in the Theodore Boone series written by John Grisham. It was released May 10, 2016.

== Plot summary ==
The story hinges on standardized testing in middle-grade schools, a matter of contemporary controversy. Teachers in a local middle school have been accused of cheating on the test, and Theodore Boone and his friend April become involved. As he and his eighth-grade classmates are also being tested, the fairness of the test is of particular concern to him. A team of several teachers are soon caught, and unluckily Theo's mother is representing them. Theo and his friends help the teachers avoid being charged and walk free.

Some readers have speculated that the book was inspired by the Atlanta cheating scandal.
