= Theodore Boone: The Abduction =

2011 novel by John Grisham

- First edition cover
- Author: John Grisham
- Language: English
- Series: Theodore Boone
- Subject: Fiction
- Genre: Legal thriller, Young adult fiction
- Publisher: Dutton Books (US); Hodder & Stoughton (UK)
- Publication date: June 7, 2011
- Publication place: United States
- Media type: mystery; fiction
- Pages: 217
- ISBN: 978-0-525-42557-1
- Preceded by: Theodore Boone: Kid Lawyer
- Followed by: Theodore Boone: The Accused

Theodore Boone: The Abduction, written by John Grisham, is the second book in the Theodore Boone series. It is written for 11- to 13-year-olds.

== Plot ==
13-year-old Theodore Boone's best friend April is not happy with her life. Her mother is a neglective hippie and her father leaves her mother and her at home for days on end to tour with his band.

The story begins with Theo being woken up in the middle of the night to find out that April has been abducted. The fear is that April's cousin, the notorious criminal Jack Leeper, has kidnapped her. He is seen around town and eventually caught. Leeper claims to know where April is but refuses to tell the police unless they agree to his conditions. Theo and his friends search the town but are stopped by unhelpful policemen. The rumors around April's disappearance are made worse when a body is pulled out of the river. The jaws are missing and the police cannot identify the clothing. However, after a few days of examining the body, the police discover it was a man.

Theo realizes that April could actually be with her dad, who is touring fraternity houses with his band. When Theo's parents leave for a law conference out of town, they leave Theo with the Whipples, who are friends of the family. Once Theo arrives at the Whipples' house, he and Chase Whipple search for pictures of April's father's band on Facebook pages and eventually spot a girl whom they assume to be April standing near the band in one of the pictures. Theo persuades his uncle Ike to drive him to the next destination of April's father's band while Chase distracts his older sister, who is supposed to be watching them, by lying about their activities.

Once Ike and Theo arrive at the fraternity house, they go to find April in the basement, where a party is going on. The two grab April and escape the basement to find one of the members of the band demanding to know what they're doing with April. Ike quickly concocts a lie about being friends with April's family and wanting to catch up with her. The band member lets them go and the trio drives back to Strattenburg.

Safely back at home, Theo is praised for finding April, and April's family goes to court to decide what changes will be implemented within their family life.

== Sequel ==
- Theodore Boone: The Accused released May 2012
