= Theodore Boone: The Activist =

2013 novel by John Grisham

- First edition (US)
- Author: John Grisham
- Language: English
- Series: Theodoore Boone series
- Genre: Legal thriller, young adult
- Publisher: E. P. Dutton books (US); Hodder & Stoughton (UK)
- Publication date: May 21, 2013
- Publication place: United States
- Pages: 272 _{(first edition)}
- ISBN: 978-0-525-42577-9
- Preceded by: Theodore Boone: The Accused
- Followed by: Theodore Boone: The Fugitive

Theodore Boone: The Activist is the fourth book in the Theodore Boone written by John Grisham. It went on sale on May 21, 2013.

== Plot summary ==
When the town of Strattenburg decides to build a bypass that will be largely useless as well as a hazard due to noise and smoke pollution, Theodore Boone decides to get involved. He is deeply affected when a friend, Hardie Quinn, tells him that the state is using the rule of eminent domain to take away his grandparents' farm to build the bypass on, and decides to find out everything he can do to stop it. While spending time on the farm, Theo, his dog, Judge, Hardie, and another friend, Woody, encounter a survey crew who are trespassing and assault the group and almost beat Judge to death. Everyone on the crew is charged for their crimes, but the fight to stop the bypass is far from over. Theo and his school put together a short video to explain the consequences, and Theo attends the hearing to approve the bypass, explaining that the state cannot use eminent domain to build something so useless and dangerous, and they have been cutting budgets everywhere to build it. The bypass is turned down, and Theo and his friends win.
