= Theodore Boone: The Fugitive =

2015 novel by John Grisham

- First edition (US)
- Author: John Grisham
- Language: English
- Genre: Legal thriller, young adult
- Publisher: E. P. Dutton (US); Hodder & Stoughton (UK)
- Publication date: May 12, 2015
- Publication place: United States
- Pages: 256
- ISBN: 978-0-525-42638-7
- Preceded by: Theodore Boone: The Activist
- Followed by: Theodore Boone: The Scandal

Theodore Boone: The Fugitive is the fifth book in the Theodore Boone series written by John Grisham. It was released May 12, 2015.

== Plot ==
Theodore Boone, a kind, independent child from Strattenburg, Pennsylvania, happens to go on a school trip to Washington, D.C. Theo sees a notorious criminal in the metro, Pete Duffy, who has been accused of murder and hasn't been seen since his first trial in Strattenburg. Luckily, Theo is able to capture a video. Theo first informs his Uncle Ike Boone, and use a face recognition software, showing a high match likelihood. Later they go to the FBI, who bring them back to DC to aid in the manhunt, and Pete Duffy is finally brought to court inside of Strattenburg. There is a problem, however. The key witness, Bobby Escobar, an illegal immigrant, is afraid to testify in fear of being deported. Bobby reluctantly confesses, and Duffy is put behind bars for life.

== Reception ==
Common Sense Media found "Like all good detective stories, this one is hard to put down." Jess Hockey for The Guardian said "Theodore Boone is back with a bang." and "It is fast-paced and you never want to put this book down; it entices you into reading more and more."
