= Camino Winds =

2020 novel by John Grisham

- Front cover
- Author: John Grisham
- Language: English
- Series: Camino Island
- Genre: Thriller, Mystery
- Publisher: Doubleday
- Publication date: April 28, 2020
- Publication place: United States
- Media type: Print (Hardcover, Paperback), E-book, Audiobook
- Pages: 336
- ISBN: 978-0-385-54593-8
- Preceded by: Camino Island

Camino Winds is a novel by the bestselling author John Grisham, set against the backdrop of a hurricane in the fictional resort town of Camino Island, Florida. The narrative unfolds around the murder of Nelson Kerr, a friend of the protagonist, Bruce Cable, who owns a local bookstore.

== Plot ==
Bruce Cable's life takes a dramatic turn when his friend Nelson Kerr is found dead amidst the chaos of a hurricane. Initially deemed a casualty of the storm, it soon becomes clear that the truth behind Nelson's death is far more sinister. As Bruce begins to investigate, he unravels a web of secrets and motives, finding that the tranquil Camino Island holds more danger and intrigue than he could have imagined.

== Publication ==
Camino Winds was published by Doubleday, and it is part of the Camino Island series by John Grisham.

== Reception ==
Camino Winds received a mixed to positive reception from both critics and readers. Kirkus Reviews noted the book's gripping narrative and well-crafted suspense. "A Rich Idea" commended Grisham's storytelling and the book's appeal to his dedicated fan base.
