= Theodore Boone: The Accomplice =

2019 novel by John Grisham

- First edition cover
- Author: John Grisham
- Language: English
- Series: Theodore Boone
- Genre: Legal drama, Children's novel
- Publisher: Dutton Children's Books
- Publication date: 2019
- Publication place: United States
- Media type: Print
- Pages: 240 (Hardcover 1st edition)
- ISBN: 0525556265 (Hardcover 1st edition), ISBN 0525556265 (Trade Paperback)
- Preceded by: Theodore Boone: The Scandal

Theodore Boone: The Accomplice was released in May 2019. It was the seventh book in the Theodore Boone series by John Grisham.

== Plot summary ==
In The Accomplice, Theo’s good friend Woody was arrested by being an accomplice to an armed robbery. While Woody was stuck in jail, Theo gathered friends and money to raise enough money to free Woody and Tony, set at $10,000 per person. Theo’s friend Chase Whipple, a computer/tech expert set up a profile for Woody on a crowdfunding site called MobMoney. Theo eventually raised enough money between friends and MobMoney, so that he could pay Woody’s $10,000 bail through a bail bond. Woody eventually got taken back to prison from going outside Stratten County to go camping with the Boy Scouts at Lake Marlo. Woody and Tony were eventually decided not guilty by Judge Pendergrast, with the only restriction being random drug tests into the next year.
