= The Partner (Grisham novel) =

1997 novel by John Grisham

- First edition cover
- Author: John Grisham
- Language: English
- Genre: Legal thriller
- Publisher: Doubleday
- Publication date: 1997
- Publication place: United States
- English publication date: 1997
- Media type: Print (Hardcover and Paperback)
- Pages: 412
- ISBN: 0-385-47295-1
- OCLC: 38277014
- Dewey Decimal: 813/.54 21
- LC Class: PS3557.R5355 P35 1997

The Partner (1997) is a legal/thriller novel by American author John Grisham. It was Grisham's eighth novel.

== Plot ==
It has been four years since Patrick Lanigan, a junior partner in a law firm based in Biloxi, Mississippi, learned of the scheme, masterminded by his firm's client, shipbuilding magnate Benny Aricia, to defraud the U.S. government via inflated and falsified contracts for the construction of U.S. Navy vessels. The firm's senior partners didn't include Lanigan in the plan, in which they stood to earn millions laundering the ill-gotten gains. Lanigan then devised a plan of his own, wherein he faked his death, stole $90 million from the secret offshore accounts where the firm had been hiding the ill-gotten gains, and then fled to South America. Since then, Lanigan started a new life with new-found love Eva. But Aricia has never forgotten the man who betrayed him and soon, his men find the former partner with intentions to do whatever it takes to recover the money. In a desperate bid, Lanigan gives power of attorney over his estate to Eva, then turns himself over to the FBI. Once returned to the U.S., Lanigan must fight multiple legal battles, in state, civil and federal courts, involving a former client, his estranged wife, and the highest levels of government, to protect the people he cares for, gain his freedom and, finally get back to Eva and the part of the fortune they secretly set aside.

Patrick essentially defeats all legal claims against him. But then Eva disappears with his remaining money, leaving him alone in Brazil.

== Critical reception ==
Publishers Weekly wrote: "To call the plot of The Partner mechanical is at least partly a compliment: it is well-oiled, intricate and works smoothly. But its cynicism is remorseless." Kirkus Reviews called the book Grisham's "best-plotted novel yet," praising the "masterfully bittersweet end."

== Film adaptation ==
In January 2025, it was announced that Tom Holland had made a deal to star in and produce an adaptation of The Partner for Universal Pictures with screenwriter Graham Moore set to write the script. Previously, John Lee Hancock had intended to adapt The Partner as a follow-up to The Blind Side for New Regency before the project stalled in development. In October 2025, it was announced that Jason Bateman will direct and executive produce the film adaptation under Aggregate Films.
