= A Painted House =

2001 novel by John Grisham

- First edition cover
- Author: John Grisham
- Language: English
- Genre: Drama
- Publisher: Doubleday
- Publication date: February 6, 2001
- Publication place: United States
- Media type: Print (hardback & paperback)
- Pages: 388 pp
- ISBN: 0-385-50120-X
- OCLC: 301832819
- Dewey Decimal: 813/.54 21
- LC Class: PS3557.R5355 P3 2001b

A Painted House is a 2001 novel by American author John Grisham.

Inspired by his childhood in Black Oak, Arkansas, it is Grisham's first major work outside the legal thriller genre in which he established himself. Initially published in serial form, the book was released in six installments in the Oxford American magazine in 2000. The entire novel was later published in hardback and paperback by Doubleday. Set in the late summer and early fall of 1952, its story is told through the eyes of seven-year-old Luke Chandler, the youngest in a family of cotton farmers struggling to harvest their crops and earn enough to settle their debts. The novel portrays the experiences that bring him from a world of innocence into a harsh reality.

== Plot ==
The story begins as Luke Chandler and his grandfather Eli, also known as Pappy, search for migrant workers to help them with the cotton picking. They initially consider themselves lucky to hire the Spruills, a family of "hill people," and a few Mexican migrants who annually come to the area looking for work.

Aside from working long hours under the hot sun in the fields, Luke's life is fairly idyllic. He is obsessed with beautiful 17-year-old Tally Spruill, who on one occasion lets him see her naked, bathing in a creek. But a much more unpleasant experience is seeing Tally's brother, the overly aggressive and mentally unstable Hank Spruill, attack three boys from the notorious Sisco family, one of whom is beaten so severely that he dies from his wounds. Hank arrogantly identifies Luke as a friendly witness who can support his version of the event. The fearful boy backs up his story, although the adults in his life, including local sheriff Stick Powers, suspect he's too frightened to admit the truth.

When Luke sees Cowboy, one of the Mexicans, later murder Hank and toss his body into the river, Cowboy threatens to kill Luke's mother if he tells anyone what he saw. Cowboy and Tally then run off together and are not seen again. Luke also learns that his admired Uncle Ricky, fighting in the Korean War, might have fathered a child with a daughter of the Latchers, their poverty-stricken sharecropping neighbors.

Grisham surrounds these dramatic moments with descriptive passages of life in the rural South and the ordinary events that fill Luke's weekly routine. His hard work in the fields is preceded by a hearty breakfast of eggs, ham, biscuits, and the one cup of coffee his mother allows him, and at day's end he's rewarded with an evening on the front porch, where the family gathers around the radio to listen to Harry Caray announce the St. Louis Cardinals baseball games. A devoted fan, Luke is saving his hard-earned money to buy a team warm-up jacket he saw advertised in the Sears, Roebuck catalog. Saturday afternoons are spent in town, where the adults share idle gossip and serious concerns and the youngsters visit the movie house, while Sunday morning is reserved for church. A visiting carnival, the annual town picnic, and Luke's introduction to television – to see a live broadcast of a World Series game – are additional bits of local color scattered throughout the tale.

A flood devastates the family's crop before the harvest is completed, and Luke's parents decide to travel to the city to find work in a Buick plant, breaking a history of generations working on the land. The novel ends with Luke's mother smiling on the bus, having finally gotten her wish to leave cotton farming.

The book's title refers to the Chandler house, which never has been painted, a sign of their lower social status in the community. One day Luke discovers that someone has been secretly painting the weather-beaten clapboards white, and eventually he continues the job with the approval of his parents and the assistance of the Mexicans, contributing some of his own savings for the purchase of paint.

== Main characters ==
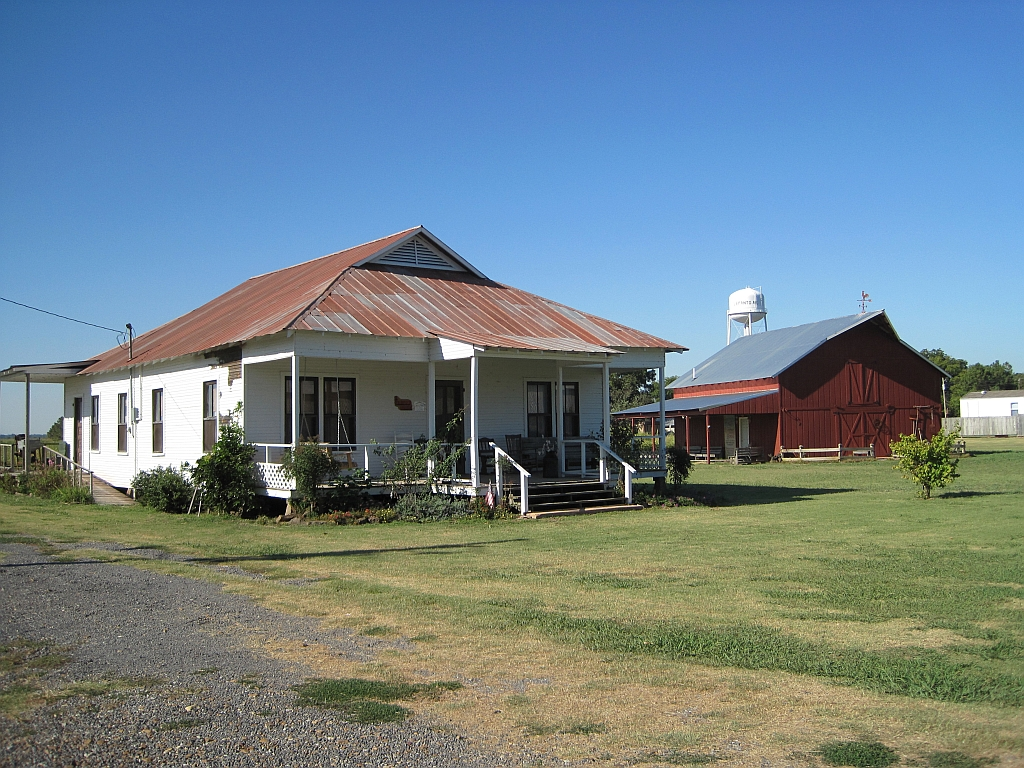
This house in Lepanto, Arkansas was the house used in the Hallmark Hall of Fame movie A Painted House

- Luke Chandler – the youngest in the family and the protagonist of the story.
- Eli "Pappy" Chandler – Luke's highly respected and hard-working grandfather and patriarch of the family. He is a World War I veteran.
- Ruth "Gran" Chandler – Luke's quiet, conservative, and wise grandmother who prays for the safe return of her younger son, Ricky, from the Korean War.
- Jesse Chandler – Luke's father, who served in World War II (during which he suffered a debilitating injury), and struggles to help his father erase the family's debt.
- Kathleen Chandler – Luke's mother, who tends to the garden while dreaming of a better life in a suburban home with indoor plumbing and modern conveniences.
- Hank Spruill – the 'hill people' family's oldest son, boastful and quick to offer violence to anyone who offends him.
- Tally Spruill – the seventeen-year-old daughter in the migrant worker family.
- Trot Spruill – the youngest Spruill, who has a crippled arm. He is also mentally slow, and is the only member of the family, other than his sister Tally, to whom Hank is never cruel.
- Cowboy – the Mexican who kills Hank, carries a switchblade and is quick to use it.

== Additional characters ==
- The remainder of the Spruill family—consisting of the parents, Leon and Lucy, who fear Hank, and their two nephews, Bo and Dale.
- Pop and Pearl Watson—owners of the local store, a meeting place for the community.
- Miguel—leader of the Mexicans who work for the Chandlers.
- Reverend/Brother Akers—the fiery minister of the Black Oak Baptist Church.
- Jimmy Dale—An uncle of Luke's, who works at a Buick plant in Michigan and offers to help his cousin Jesse find employment if he and his family relocate north.
- Stacy—Jimmy Dale's snobbish "Yankee" bride, who is horrified by the Chandlers' living conditions and becomes the butt of Luke's practical joke as retaliation for her arrogant attitude.
- Stick Powers—Black Oak's lazy overweight sheriff, who asserts his authority when necessary but would prefer to catnap in his car parked in the shade.
- The Latcher family—A family of poor sharecroppers, whose daughter Libby gives birth to a child she claims is fathered by Ricky Chandler.
- Dewayne—Luke's best friend.
- Ricky Chandler—Luke's 19-year-old uncle - in effect, more of an elder brother - who is fighting in the Korean War. He is never seen and referenced only in letters and flashbacks.

== Television adaptation ==
On April 27, 2003, CBS broadcast a television adaptation directed by Alfonso Arau for the Hallmark Hall of Fame. Aside from advancing Luke's age from seven to ten and adding a brief scene at the end, Patrick Sheane Duncan's teleplay remained faithful to its source and frequently used Grisham's dialogue verbatim.

The cast included Scott Glenn as Pappy, Logan Lerman as Luke, Robert Sean Leonard as Jesse, Melinda Dillon as Gran, Arija Bareikis as Kathleen, Audrey Marie Anderson as Tally, Luis Esteban Garcia as Cowboy, and Pablo Schreiber as Hank.
