= Theodore Boone: The Accused =

2012 novel by John Grisham

- First edition (US)
- Author: John Grisham
- Language: English
- Genre: Legal thriller, Young adult fiction
- Publisher: Dutton Books for Young Readers (US); Hodder & Stoughton (UK)
- Publication date: May 15, 2012
- Publication place: United States
- Pages: 271 _{(first edition)}
- ISBN: 978-0-525-42576-2
- Preceded by: Theodore Boone: The Abduction
- Followed by: Theodore Boone: The Activist

Theodore Boone: The Accused is the third book in the series of Theodore Boone. It is written by John Grisham and is the third book that he has written for Young Adults (8-13-year-olds). It went on sale on May 15, 2012. The book opens with the continuation of book two.

== Plot ==
The murder trial of Pete Duffy is about to begin and that is all anyone can talk about. Theo has permission from his teacher to be in court for the opening remarks and to report back to the class what happened. It turns out, though, that Pete Duffy skipped town and the trial is postponed. When Theo returns to school he notices that his locker has been tampered with. He doesn't say anything about it, as it would be a hassle to report. However, one day he's called into the principal's office, where two detectives are awaiting him and ask to see his locker. Theo's locker is found to contain three stolen tablets from Big Mac's computer store, which has recently been broken into. From this point on, Theo is considered the main suspect for the robbery. In addition to the false accusation, a picture of Theo leaving the police station and a description of his "crimes" is circulated to the town, which leads to teasing by some schoolmates. During one such round, a friend of Theo's, Woody, steps in and tells the teaser, Baxter, to stop. The two then begin to fight, with Baxter's friend Griff jumping in. Theo then also jumps in, for the sake of his friend. All participants in the brawl end up receiving suspension for two days and probation for a thirty-day period. Later, when Theo visits his uncle Ike, Ike proposes the idea that the culprit behind both Big Mac's store robbery is the child of one of Mrs. Boone's clients, a child who prefers their father over their mother. With some digging, Ike and Theo are able to work out who the culprits may be: Jessie and Jonah Finn, brothers who fit Ike's suggestions. With help from Theo's friends, the police pin the theft on the Finns, who are arrested. They get a call from the head of the school and they say that they want to press charges.

== Characters ==
- Theodore "Theo" Boone – The main character. He is accused of breaking into Big Mac's computer store and stealing various electronics. During the police's investigation, he is teased by many of his classmates due to being the suspect of a crime.
- Marcella Boone – Theo's mother. She is a divorce lawyer who is handling Linda Finn's divorce case.
- Woods Boone – Theo's father.
- Ike – Theo's uncle. He is a key figure in figuring out who actually robbed Big Mac's store.
- Big Mac – A man who owns a computer store, which is robbed. He is immensely suspicious of Theo, due to Theo's cap being left inside his store.
- Detective Vorman – One of the detectives assigned to investigate the theft of Big Mac's store.
- Detective Hamilton – The other detective assigned to investigate the theft of Big Mac's store.
- Mrs. Gladswell – the school's principal.
- Jonah Finn – A seventh-grader who attends Theo's school. He, along with his brother, Jessie Finn, rob Big Mac's store and torment Theo due to his mother being their mother's lawyer in an ongoing divorce case. They want to live with their father instead of their mother. Eventually, he is arrested alongside his brother.
- Jessie Finn – A ninth-grader who attends Strattenburg High School. He, along with his brother, Jonah Finn, rob Big Mac's store and torment Theo due to his mother being their mother's lawyer in an ongoing divorce case. They want to live with their father instead of their mother. Eventually, he is arrested alongside his brother.
- Woody Lambert – Friend who helped with investigating the Finns.
- Chase Whipple – Friend who helped with investigating the Finns.
