= Theodore Boone =

- Theodore Boone children's books character
- First appearance: Kid Lawyer (2010)
- Last appearance: The Accomplice (2019)
- Created by: John Grisham

In-universe information
- Aliases: Theo, Teddy
- Gender: Male
- Occupation: Eighth grade student
- Family: Woods Boone (father); Marcella Boone (mother); Ike Boone (uncle)

Theodore Boone is a fictional character created by John Grisham, who is the title character in Grisham's legal series for children. As of 2019, Boone has appeared in seven books.

Boone is a kind, independent 13-year-old student who resides in the medium-sized city of Strattenburg, Pennsylvania, with his parents: Woods Boone, a real estate lawyer, and Marcella Boone, a divorce attorney. Theo dreams of following in their footsteps one day, becoming either a lawyer or judge. Thanks to his parents' work, Theo knows a great deal about the law and knows many police officers and judges in the city. He often helps his classmates solve issues they are having.

== Books ==
Boone appears in the following novels, published by Grosset & Dunlap.

No.	Title	Date	ISBN
1	Kid Lawyer	May 25, 2010	978-0-525-42384-3
2	The Abduction	June 6, 2011	978-0-525-42557-1
3	The Accused	May 15, 2012	978-0-525-42576-2
4	The Activist	May 21, 2013	978-0-525-42577-9
5	The Fugitive	May 12, 2015	978-0-525-42638-7
6	The Scandal	May 10, 2016	978-0-525-42639-4
7	The Accomplice	May 14, 2019	978-0-525-55626-8
