= The Broker =

2005 novel by John Grisham

The Broker (novel)
- First edition cover
- Author: John Grisham
- Language: English
- Genre: Thriller
- Publisher: Doubleday
- Publication date: January 11, 2005
- Publication place: United States
- Media type: Print (hardback & paperback)
- Pages: 368 pp (hardcover edition)
- ISBN: 0-385-51045-4
- OCLC: 57236073
- Dewey Decimal: 813/.54 22
- LC Class: PS3557.R5355 B76 2005b

The Broker is a suspense novel written by American author John Grisham and published in the United States on January 11, 2005. The novel follows the story of Joel Backman, a newly pardoned prisoner who had tried to broker a deal to sell the world's most powerful satellite surveillance system to the highest bidder.

== Plot ==
Joel Backman is "the Broker", one of the most powerful lobbyists in Washington, D.C. However, Backman's life falls apart when a deal collapses involving a hacked spy satellite that nobody knows about, resulting in his imprisonment. Six years later, the political wheels have turned and other power-hungry men are eager for Backman's blood. Bargains are made, and after an outgoing disgraced President grants him a full pardon at the behest of the CIA, Backman finds himself spirited out of the prison in the middle of the night, bundled onto a military plane, and flown to Italy to begin a new life. He has a new name and mysterious new "friends" who teach him to speak Italian and to blend in with the people in Bologna.

However, Backman soon realizes that something is not quite kosher in this new setup, in that he is under constant surveillance. In reality, the CIA is setting him up for professional assassins from China, Israel, Russia, Saudi Arabia and other countries. They intend to sit back and wait to see who kills him in an effort to solve the biggest mystery to hit the U.S. government in decades: the question of who built this seemingly impenetrable and most advanced satellite ever. It turns out to be China; despite having low satellite technology, they stole the information from the U.S.

Backman barely survives several assassination attempts and manages to establish communication with his son, Neal. He escapes surveillance and returns to his home to contract a new deal with the federal government. The CIA is told about the satellite, along with the taking of the satellite's program. In return, they agree to do what they can to get the countries targeting him to back off, though they caution him that some of them will not listen. Backman then covers his escape by pretending that he is resuming his old life, then quietly disappears and presumably returns to Italy.

== Literary significance and criticism ==
The Broker made number one on the New York Times bestseller list. The book has been hailed by some critics as a return to form for Grisham, while others lament it as a superficial "trip to Italy" put into fiction form. A New York Times book review claimed that the description of an outgoing president who was "an idiot... but a clean one" seemed to be referring to President Bush, or perhaps to Bill Clinton's infamous last-minute presidential pardons in 2001.

The description of the town of Bologna, Italy, in the novel is quite accurate; however, it contains a few mistakes. For instance:

- The church dedicated to Saint Petronius is called "cathedral", but although it is the largest church in town, it has never been the Cathedral of Bologna, as the author himself states elsewhere in the same book.
- It is explained that Bologna is nicknamed "the Red city" because it is the most deeply communist town in Italy. Actually, Bologna was nicknamed "la Rossa" ("the Red one") centuries before Marx was born, the word "communism" was invented, or the colour red was even associated with a political ideology. This nickname is because most old buildings in the town centre are red, since the earth of the local hills, when baked to make bricks, acquires this colour.
- One of the Italian teachers of the main character states that only two medieval towers are still standing in Bologna and that all the others were demolished by order of the local authorities in the nineteenth century. In reality, numerous medieval towers are still standing in Bologna. Some of them are clearly visible from the places the main character visits, like Piazza Maggiore or the top of the Asinelli Tower. After the municipality had three towers demolished in 1917 to build new palaces, the decision was harshly criticised by some famous people of that time.
- Another error lies in the orbital mechanics of the secret satellite system. The satellites are described as having an over-ground speed of 120 miles per hour, but are only 300 miles above the Earth's surface; this is physically impossible for low-orbit satellites, which need an over-ground speed of over 16,000 miles per hour (and an orbital speed of about 17,000 miles per hour) to maintain orbit.

Additional errors include a scene where a character suggests that he be sent any medical bills for an injury sustained; in Italy there is a comprehensive state healthcare system and so this would not be relevant. In a later scene, a CIA agent travels on an Alitalia flight to Washington in economy class and has to pay for drinks; Alitalia long haul services include all drinks. Furthermore, as Backman travels per train from Italy to Switzerland and the train stops in Chiasso, is mentioned the train will make a few more stops in Italy before entering Switzerland, but Chiasso is already in Switzerland.
