= Camino Island =

2017 novel by John Grisham

- First edition (US)
- Author: John Grisham
- Language: English
- Genre: Crime fiction
- Publisher: Doubleday (US); Hodder & Stoughton (US)
- Publication date: June 6, 2017
- Publication place: United States
- ISBN: 978-0-385-54302-6
- Followed by: Camino Winds

Camino Island is a crime fiction thriller novel written by John Grisham and released on June 6, 2017, by Doubleday. The book is a departure from Grisham's main subject of legal thrillers and focuses on stolen rare books. Grisham made his first extensive book tour in 25 years to publicize the book.

== Plot ==
The book begins with the theft of five rare F. Scott Fitzgerald manuscripts from the Firestone Library at Princeton University and then embarks on a journey to a resort town on a Florida island in search of clues about the heist. Although the Federal Bureau of Investigation and an "underground agency" of investigators working for Princeton's insurance company pursue the perpetrators in the black market, the story focuses on a novelist who becomes involved in the search and pursues an investigation of the heist.

== Background ==
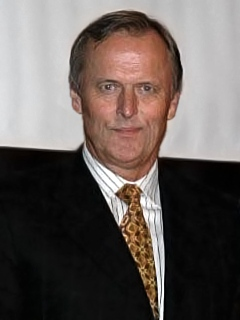
Author John Grisham

Grisham conceived of the subject with his wife on a lengthy road trip to Florida when they discussed a work incorporating "stolen books, stolen manuscripts, bookstores, [and] booksellers". In February 2017, Doubleday books announced that Grisham would publish a crime heist novel in June in addition to his usual fall legal thriller. Publicity for the book included Grisham's first major book tour in 25 years, which included 12 cities and was scheduled from June 6 through June 29.

== Reception ==
=== Sales ===
The book appeared at the top of several best seller lists including USA Today, The Wall Street Journal, and The New York Times.

=== Critical review ===
USA Today critic Jocelyn McClurg praised the book as "sheer catnip for book critics" that resembles Grisham's legal thrillers with many similar character types but that might appeal to people who are not generally Grisham fans. Ken Tucker from The New York Times said that occasional flaws "don't impede the jolly appeal of the novel's storytelling".
