= The Summons (Grisham novel) =

2002 novel by John Grisham

- Author: John Grisham
- Language: English
- Genre: Legal thriller novel
- Publisher: Doubleday
- Publication date: 2002
- Publication place: United States
- Media type: Print (Hardback & Paperback)
- Pages: 373
- ISBN: 0-385-50382-2
- OCLC: 48258563
- Dewey Decimal: 813/.54 21
- LC Class: PS3557.R5355 S86 2002b

The Summons is a legal thriller novel written by American author John Grisham, first published in February 2002. Known for his courtroom dramas, Grisham once again explores the legal world in this novel, though with a significant departure into family dynamics and mystery.

== Plot summary ==
Ray Atlee is a law professor with a good salary at the University of Virginia. He has a brother, Forrest, and a father, known to many as Judge Reuben V. Atlee. Ray is sent to his father's home in Clanton, Mississippi, to discuss issues regarding the old man's will and estate. When he finds his father dead in the study, Ray discovers a sum of over $3 million in the house, money which is not part of Judge Atlee's will. Ray immediately thinks the money is "dirty" because his father could not possibly have made so much of it in his career.

Assuming that he is the only one who knows about the money, Ray decides to take it without making it officially part of the estate: he knows that if he did, taxes would take most of the money. But later reality proves otherwise. Ray is being followed; someone else knows about the money. After his own investigations into the roots of the money and the identity of his shadow—including trips to casinos and shady meetings with prominent southern lawyers—he eventually discovers that Forrest has the money. He finds Forrest in a drug rehab compound and confronts him. At the end both part, with Forrest telling Ray that he will contact him in a year.
