= Theodore Boone: Kid Lawyer =

2010 novel by John Grisham

- First edition cover
- Author: John Grisham
- Language: English
- Series: Theodore Boone
- Genre: Legal drama, Children's novel
- Publisher: Dutton Children's Books
- Publication date: 2010
- Publication place: United States
- Media type: Print
- Pages: 263 (Hardcover 1st edition)
- ISBN: 978-1-4447-1448-7 (Hardcover 1st edition), ISBN 978-1-4447-1449-4 (Trade Paperback)
- Followed by: Theodore Boone: The Abduction

Theodore Boone: Kid Lawyer, known as Theodore Boone: Young Lawyer in the United States, is a 2010 legal drama and the first novel by John Grisham for middle-grade children (8–13-year-olds). It is the first in a series about Theodore Boone. Grisham jokingly said in an interview that he wanted to catch up with Harry Potter, since his number one place was taken in the bestsellers.

== Plot ==
Thirteen-year-old Theodore "Theo" Boone is the son of Woods Boone, a real estate lawyer, and Marcella Boone, a divorce lawyer, and cherishes an ambition to become either a judge or lawyer himself. At the beginning of the book, Theo meets famed playboy Nathan Barbosa, who informs Theodore of the big murder trial of Peter Duffy, accused of strangling his wife for her life insurance money. The crime appears to have no witnesses or concrete evidence, though Theo comes to learn that an illegal immigrant, Abdullah Shodunke, saw Duffy outside his house at the time of the murder, acting suspicious and dropping the gloves he was wearing in the garbage. Gradually, Theo and Abdullah's cousin, Julio Pena, are able to convince Abdullah to come forward, file for documentation, and give his evidence, leading to a mistrial until a retrial can be held. Duffy's charges are refiled and Duffy remains free on bond, as he had been previously. Nathan Barbosa then thanks Theodore for looking into the case, and gives him a melon, which becomes a symbolic plot drive for the rest of the book series.

== Sequels ==
John Grisham has written seven books in total in the Theodore Boone series, which were published between 2010 and 2019.

Nathan Barbosa is having a spin off series being written in progress by John Grisham.
