= The Rainmaker (novel) =

Novel by John Grisham

- First edition cover
- Author: John Grisham
- Language: English
- Genre: Legal thriller novel
- Publisher: Doubleday
- Publication date: 1995
- Publication place: United States
- Media type: Print (Hardback & Paperback)
- Pages: 434 pp
- ISBN: 0-385-42473-6
- OCLC: 31969873
- Dewey Decimal: 813/.54 20
- LC Class: PS3557.R5355 R35 1995

The Rainmaker is a 1995 novel by John Grisham, his sixth.

== Plot ==
The book's title is derived from a lawyer who wins spectacular cases and earns huge sums in damages. Its protagonist dreams of becoming such a "rainmaker" – which comes true, but not in the way he expected.

Rudy Baylor is a third-year law student at Memphis State. During an outreach session for a class in elder law, he signs two clients. One is Miss Birdie, an 80-year-old woman who needs a revised will drawn. The other is a poor family, Dot and Buddy Black, whose leukemia-stricken son, Donny Ray, could have been saved by a bone marrow transplant for which his identical twin brother is a perfect match. The procedure should have been covered and paid for by their insurance carrier, Great Benefit Life Insurance, but the claim was instead denied.

Weeks before graduation, Rudy loses his upcoming job after his employers are bought out by Tinley Britt, a powerful Memphis law firm that represents Great Benefit. After failing to secure a position with another firm, Rudy is recruited by J. Lyman "Bruiser" Stone, a ruthless and successful ambulance chaser with corrupt business dealings. To earn his fee, Rudy is required to hunt for potential clients at the local hospital and sign them up to personal injury lawsuits. He is mentored by Deck Shifflet, a less-than-ethical former insurance assessor who received a law degree but failed the bar exam six times.

While studying for the bar exam in the hospital cafeteria, Rudy meets Kelly Riker, a beautiful teenage patient recovering from injuries inflicted by her husband, Cliff. Though they quickly fall for each other, Kelly is reluctant to file for divorce out of fear that Cliff might kill her if she did. Rudy continues to stay in contact with Kelly after she is discharged, providing support and encouraging her to break free of her abusive relationship.

When Stone's firm is about to be raided by the police and the FBI, Rudy and Deck set up their own private practice and represent the Blacks in their lawsuit against Great Benefit. The original judge is a lazy and incompetent conservative who makes his support of Great Benefit clear and was getting ready to dismiss the case for no valid legal reason, but he dies in his sleep and is replaced by a liberal African-American star attorney--who makes it very clear to Great Benefit that the case will move forward and they had better focus on their legal arguments because their patron and his bias aren't coming back.

Donny Ray dies just before the case goes to trial, and Rudy uncovers a scheme by Great Benefit to deny every insurance claim regardless of validity. The company was playing the odds that the insured would not consult an attorney. The trial ends with the jury awarding the plaintiffs an unprecedented sum of $50.2 million - a sensational verdict making the headlines and catapulting Rudy into the limelight. However, Great Benefit declares bankruptcy days after its parent corporation smuggles the company's assets out of the country, leaving it an empty shell.

Ultimately, there is no payout for the grieving parents and no fee for Rudy, though Dot takes greater satisfaction in the belief that she put Great Benefit out of business.

When Kelly is beaten again by Cliff during the trial, Rudy shelters her in a safe house for abused women and files for divorce on her behalf. As they secretly attempt to retrieve items from her old apartment, Cliff ambushes them with a baseball bat, but Rudy manages to snatch the bat away and fatally wounds him in the struggle. Kelly instructs Rudy to leave and allows herself to be charged with manslaughter. Cliff's family threatens him and demands that the local prosecutor jail him and Kelly, but after Rudy outlines how he'll let the grand jury see the evidence of Cliff's brutality, the prosecutor (who is presented as an upstanding lawyer) decides to not file any charges against Rudy or Kelly. With no remaining cases and the imminent threat of Cliff's family, Rudy and Kelly leave Memphis to begin a new life together, heading for someplace where Rudy – who has become disillusioned with the law – can become a teacher, and Kelly can attend college.

== Reception ==
The Los Angeles Times called the book "an indictment of the legal system from law school to the jury’s verdict." Entertainment Weekly wrote that "if The Rainmaker’s outcome is a bit predictable, Grisham’s vivid minor characters and near-Dickensian zeal for mocking pomposity and privilege are apt to endear him to his many readers all over again." Publishers Weekly wrote that "this bittersweet tale, the author's quietest and most thoughtful, shows that Grisham's imagination can hold its own in a courtroom as well as on the violent streets outside."

The book sold 300,000 copies in its first four days, one of the fastest selling novels in history at the time.

In an interview with Time magazine, John Grisham said that Rudy Baylor is the one protagonist from all his novels that he would like to be the most.

== In other media ==
=== Film adaptation ===
In 1997, The Rainmaker was adapted into a film directed by Francis Ford Coppola and starring Matt Damon, Danny DeVito, Claire Danes, Jon Voight, and Danny Glover.

=== Television adaptation ===
In 2018, it was reported that Michael Seitzman and Jason Richman were developing a television adaptation of The Rainmaker with Hulu and ABC Studios; it was conceived as part of a shared universe of series based on John Grisham's novels, and was to be developed and filmed concurrently with an adaptation of Rogue Lawyer containing interwoven plot elements and recurring characters. Neither series went forward with Hulu.

The project was later revived as a standalone series with Blumhouse Television and Lionsgate Television; USA Network ordered it to series in June 2024. It premiered on August 15, 2025.
