= The Reckoning (Grisham novel) =

2018 novel by John Grisham

- First edition (US)
- Author: John Grisham
- Language: English
- Genre: Legal thriller
- Publisher: Doubleday (US); Hodder & Stoughton (UK)
- Publication date: October 23, 2018
- Publication place: United States
- Pages: 480
- ISBN: 978-0-525-63931-2
- Preceded by: The Rooster Bar

The Reckoning is a best-selling novel by John Grisham. In addition to Grisham's typical legal thriller, the book was also characterized by reviewers as "a murder mystery, a courtroom drama, a family saga, a coming-of-age story," "a period piece", and a war novel.

== Plot ==
In 1946, World War II veteran Pete Banning owns a 640-acre parcel in northern Mississippi. Pete's wife Liza has recently been placed in a mental institution; his children Joel and Stella are college students; and his sister Florry is a would-be writer who lives on an adjacent parcel. One morning, for seemingly no reason, Pete fatally shoots Dexter Bell, the pastor of the local Methodist church. Pete makes no secret of what he has done and submits to arrest by Sheriff Nix Gridley without resistance, repeatedly refusing to explain the murder. After some internal friction, a grand jury returns an indictment of first-degree murder.

Pete refuses the efforts of John Wilbanks, the Banning family's attorney, to request for change of venue or prepare for a plea of temporary insanity. Joel and Stella attempt to visit their mother at the hospital but are denied access per instructions from Pete. After the brief trial, during which Pete declines to mount a defense, he is convicted with a sentence of death. Pete is allowed to visit Liza at the hospital, where they have a cryptic final exchange. On the day of his scheduled execution, the governor personally offers to commute Pete's sentence if he will state a reason for having committed the murder - which he stubbornly refuses to do. Pete is sent to the electric chair and is buried the next day.

Two decades earlier, in 1925, Pete meets 18-year-old Liza at a debutante ball in Memphis. After a brief and passionate romance, they elope and marry. After the deaths of Pete's parents in the early 1930s, the couple moved to the cotton farm. Pete is recalled to active military duty during the war and is deployed to the Philippines, where he narrowly escapes death during the Bataan Death March and is held in a Japanese prison camp. Word reaches Liza that he is missing and presumed dead.

As Pete is being transferred by ship to a slave labor camp in Japan, he escapes when the ship is torpedoed. A letter to Liza revealing that he's alive is destroyed by sympathetic Filipinos who are afraid of reprisal if found in possession of the letter. Pete and fellow soldier named Clay Wampler join a guerilla force in the Philippine mountains and mount numerous effective attacks on the Japanese. After U.S. forces liberate the Philippines, Pete is rescued and is treated at a military hospital in San Francisco. Liza receives a call from him and, after recovering from her shock, she rushes to San Francisco for a joyous reunion. In May 1945, he returned to Mississippi.

Following Pete's execution in 1946, Joel becomes the legally appointed guardian of his mother. He and Stella begin visiting her periodically. Errol McLeish, a Georgia lawyer who has befriended Bell's widow, Jackie, associates Mississippi lawyer Burch Dunlap as counsel to represent her in a wrongful death suit against the Banning estate. As a lengthy sequence of legal issues is worked out, Joel and Stella make fitful progress on bringing stability back into their lives, with Joel in law school and Stella working as a teacher. Liza escapes from the hospital, returns home, has a long talk with Florry, and commits suicide lying atop Pete's grave. Jackie's lawsuits prevail, resulting in all of the Banning family's property going to Jackie, who has married McLeish.

Joel and Stella go for a final visit with Florry, who is in failing health. On her deathbed, Florry tells the story of how Liza, thinking Pete was dead in the Philippines, had an impromptu sexual relationship with Jupe, the grandson of two elderly employees on the Banning family farm who were descended from slaves. Liza became pregnant and was taken to Memphis by Dexter Bell - a loyal friend who never had sex with her - for an abortion. She was left with a persistent infection that caused her to lose interest in sex with Pete upon his return from the war. Pete ultimately confronted her with evidence of the abortion and suspected she had an affair with Dexter. Liza, unable to admit to her relationship with a black man, lets Pete believe that Dexter is the father, resulting in the murder. The young Jupe escaped death - had the truth come out, he would have either been killed by Pete or lynched, as was common in the segregationist South of the time.

After mulling over the mess, Joel understands why all the people did what they did, but wishes he were still ignorant. When Stella joins him, they agree that the two of them will stick together and never return to Mississippi.
