= The Last Juror =

2004 novel by John Grisham

- First edition cover
- Author: John Grisham
- Language: English
- Genre: Legal thriller novel
- Publisher: Doubleday
- Publication date: 2004
- Publication place: United States
- Media type: Hardcover, Paperback
- ISBN: 0-385-51043-8

The Last Juror is a 2004 legal thriller novel by John Grisham, first published by Doubleday on February 3, 2004.

== Plot introduction ==
The story is set in the fictional town of Clanton, Mississippi from 1970 to 1979. Clanton is also the venue for John Grisham's first novel A Time to Kill which was published in 1989. Some of the characters appear in both novels with the same occupation and characteristics. Although A Time to Kill was published 15 years before The Last Juror, it took place in 1985 (on the first page of Chapter 3, it notes the date as Wednesday, May 15), which is a year after Grisham formed the idea for A Time to Kill, his first novel, and began writing it. Therefore, the characters who appear in both novels, such as Lucien Wilbanks and Harry Rex Vonner, have matured in A Time to Kill. Harry Rex Vonner also appears in the novel The Summons, published in 2002, as an adviser of the protagonist Ray Atlee.

Some references in the book are clearly hinting at things known to readers of A Time to Kill. For example, in 1970 most blacks in Ford County don't take part in elections - taking for granted that since whites are the great majority in the county, no black candidate would have chance of being elected to local office. However, as A Time to Kill makes clear, a decade later a black Sheriff would be duly elected, with the overwhelming support of blacks and whites alike.

The novel is divided into three parts. The first covers the trial of Danny Padgitt, the second focuses on Willie adjusting to life in Clanton, and the third includes the main events, the murder of the jurors.

== Plot ==
In 1970, a 23-year-old college dropout named Willie Traynor realizes that his dreams of becoming a Pulitzer-winning journalist will never come true. He moves to Clanton, Mississippi for an internship at the local newspaper, The Ford County Times. However, the aging editor, Wilson Caudle, drives the newspaper into bankruptcy through years of neglect and mismanagement. Willie spontaneously decides to buy the paper for $50,000, using money borrowed from his wealthy grandmother, and becomes the editor and owner of the Times.

Soon afterwards, Danny Padgitt, a member of a notorious local family, brutally rapes and murders a young widow, Rhoda Kassellaw. When Traynor publishes a front-page photo of the blood-spattered Padgitt being led into jail, readership increases. However, Willie is accused of yellow journalism and pre-judging Padgitt. Later, Willie runs a human interest story about Callie Ruffin, a local black woman whose seven children (among eight) all gained doctorates and teaching positions in various universities. In the process of researching the story, Willie becomes a close friend of Callie and her family.

In the process of jury selection for Padgitt's trial, Callie becomes the first black person to serve on a Ford County jury. Though far from enthusiastic about the prospect of having to pass a death sentence, Callie - who had been active of the Civil Rights Movement - does not shirk her civic duty. In court, Padgitt openly threatens to kill each of the jurors if he's convicted. But though the jury convicts Padgitt, they are divided on whether to sentence him to death row, so he is sentenced to life imprisonment at the Mississippi State Penitentiary. Unconfirmed rumors persist that Hank Hooten, the deputy prosecutor in the case, had been the lover of the victim - which, if true, would constitute a conflict of interest.

In the ensuing years, as the Times becomes highly successful and steadily increases circulation, Willie keeps an eye on Padgitt. He campaigns against the extremely favorable conditions which his family procured for him in prison. However, Padgitt is paroled after nine years. Immediately after his return to Clanton, two of the former jurors are killed by a sniper rifle and fear spreads through the county. Callie's children and neighbors organize to guard her day and night. The Padgitt family offers alibis as to Danny's whereabouts during the murders. This is taken with great skepticism, but with no tangible proof to the contrary, the authorities hesitate to take action.

Callie reveals that the victims were jurors who voted against sentencing Padgitt to death. A third juror - who also opposed a death sentence - narrowly escapes a bomb sent through the mail. The resulting public uproar forces the authorities' hands, and a warrant is issued for Padgitt's arrest. Against expectations, Padgitt surrenders to police. During his bail hearing, however, Padgitt is shot and killed by Hooten, who is hiding in the ceiling. Hooten barricades himself in the courthouse tower and, after a short standoff, commits suicide. It is revealed that Padgitt - though guilty of his original crime - was innocent of the murders. Willie discovers that Hooten was indeed involved with Rhoda Kassellaw, and sought revenge against Padgitt and the three jurors who voted against his death sentence.

A big newspaper chain, extending operations throughout the South, becomes interested in purchasing the Times. Willie sells the paper for $1.5 million, but his satisfaction is marred when Callie dies of a heart attack. The book ends with Willie writing her obituary.

== Characters in The Last Juror ==
- Joyner William "Willie" Traynor - the narrator, protagonist, and editor of the local newspaper, The Times.
- Calia "Miss Callie" Harris Ruffin - a black woman with eight children, seven of whom have Ph.Ds. She is selected for jury duty at the Padgitt trial. She and Traynor share an unlikely friendship.
- Baggy Suggs - an alcoholic reporter for The Times.
- Wiley Meek - photographer for The Times.
- Danny Padgitt - a member of the notorious Padgitt family. He rapes and murders Rhoda Kassellaw but is given parole after only nine years in prison.
- Lucien Wilbanks - defense lawyer for Danny Padgitt.
- Harry Rex Vonner - a lawyer who befriends Willie, helping him with various legal and moral issues throughout the novel.
- Sam Ruffin - eighth child of Calia Ruffin. He had an affair with a married white woman and is afraid to return to Clanton.
- Rhoda Kassellaw - the victim of Danny Padgitt.
- Judge Loopus - the judge at the Padgitt trial.
- Ernie Gaddis - prosecution lawyer at the Padgitt trial
- Hank Hooten - another lawyer at the Padgitt trial. He is rumoured to have had a relationship with Rhoda Kassellaw before her death. He later goes insane, killing two jurors and Danny Padgitt.
