= The Street Lawyer =

Thriller novel by John Grisham

- First edition cover
- Author: John Grisham
- Language: English
- Genre: Legal thriller
- Publisher: Belfry Holdings Inc.
- Publication date: 1998
- Publication place: United States
- English publication date: 1998
- Media type: Hardcover, paperback
- Pages: 309
- ISBN: 0-440-22570-1

The Street Lawyer is a legal thriller novel by John Grisham. It was Grisham's ninth novel. The book was released in the United States on January 1, 1998, published by Bantam Books, and on March 30, 1998 in the UK, published by Century.

== Plot ==
A homeless man, identifying himself only as "Mister," enters the offices of the powerful Washington D.C. law firm Drake & Sweeney and takes many of the lawyers hostage while angrily demanding information about some kind of eviction that took place. Although he is eventually shot and killed by a police sniper, one of the hostages, an antitrust lawyer named Michael Brock, is concerned by what he has learned and feels compelled to investigate further.

Brock finds his way to the 14th Street Legal Clinic, where he meets Mordecai Green, an advocate for the homeless. Green, along with his abrasive but brilliant staff, work to provide legal help to the most downtrodden members of society. Brock discovers that Drake & Sweeney were involved in the sudden approval of a federal building project on the site of a condemned building that had been serving as rent-payment housing for formerly homeless families. These individuals were tenants and thus entitled to a full legal eviction/contestment process, but a senior Drake & Sweeney partner ignored this information because the firm had a large stake in ensuring the federal project start on time, and thus illegally evicted the tenants in the middle of winter, resulting in the death of a homeless family. Brock takes a confidential file, intending to copy it, but is quickly suspected of its theft.

Shocked by what he has found, Brock leaves Drake & Sweeney to take a poorly paid position with the legal clinic. This leads to the severing of his links to his previous white collar life, as his already-dying marriage officially ends in an amicable divorce. Brock later becomes emotionally involved in the case of a woman named Ruby, whose drug addiction led to her losing custody of her son. He also meets a young homeless advocate named Megan and they start a relationship. As Drake & Sweeney comes after Brock with theft and malpractice allegations, the legal clinic files a lawsuit against the firm and its business partners. The firm makes a deal where Brock has his license temporarily suspended, while they settle for a large amount of money and fire the partner whose actions led to the young family's deaths.

Drake & Sweeney's head partner, deeply troubled by the events, offers to make his entire staff available for pro bono work to assist the clinic in fighting for the rights of homeless people. The book ends with Brock taking a short vacation with Megan and Ruby, and them reflecting on their lives.

== Characters ==
- Polly – the secretary of Michael Brock
- Michael Brock – the protagonist; a wealthy lawyer at Drake & Sweeney.
- DeVon "Mister" Hardy – homeless man who takes hostages at Drake & Sweeney.
- Mordecai Green – a street lawyer.
- Claire Brock – wife of Michael Brock; aspiring neurosurgeon.
- Arthur Jacobs – senior partner at Drake & Sweeney.
- Barry Nuzzo – long-time associate lawyer with Drake & Sweeney.
- Braden Chance – a real estate lawyer at Drake & Sweeney, who covered-up the illegal eviction.
- Hector Palma – paralegal for Braden Chance, who helps Brock gain evidence for his case.
- Lontae Burton – a homeless woman with four children: Ontario, Alonzo, Dante, and Temeko. They all die of carbon monoxide poisoning when snow blocks the exhaust pipe of their car. They were victims of the eviction, which indirectly resulted in their deaths.
- Abraham Lebow – a street lawyer; associate of Mordecai Green and Sofia Mendoza.
- Sofia Mendoza – a social worker; associate of Mordecai Green and Abraham Lebow.
- Tillman Gantry – former pimp, small-time hustler, and twice convicted felon, who owned the apartments where the illegal eviction took place.
- Ruby – a homeless woman addicted to drugs. Brock tries to help her get over her addiction so she can see her son again.
- Megan – Brock's later love interest who works at the women's homeless shelter.

== Reception ==
The novel received generally positive reviews. Charles Spencer wrote in the Sunday Telegraph that "no one does it better than Grisham" and that the book is "as unputdownable as ever". Mat Coward wrote in his review in The Independent that the novel is "fluent and fascinating" and mentioned "Few writers have so much to say, the skills to make reading what they say an irresistible pleasure – and the clout to be able to be able to say it to an audience of millions".

Michiko Kakutani of the New York Times gave the novel a negative review, stating "Grisham is too busy charging ahead to bother fleshing out any of these developments" and describing the novel as "a brand-name novel with an unlikable hero, a slapdash plot and some truly awful prose." It reached #1 on the New York Times bestsellers chart, maintaining the position for several weeks.

== Unsold television pilot ==
In 2003, plans were announced, and a television pilot filmed, for a proposed small screen adaptation of the novel. Produced by Touchstone Television and broadcast on ABC, the show was to star Eddie Cibrian as Brock, KaDee Strickland, Mario Van Peebles and Hal Holbrook. Paris Barclay directed the pilot, which was scripted by Brian Koppelman and David Levien. For reasons that were never made public, the show was never given a full season pick-up.
