= Saving Max =

2010 novel by Antoinette van Heugten

- First edition
- Author: Antoinette van Heugten
- Language: English
- Subject: Asperger syndrome, murder
- Genre: Novel
- Publisher: Mira Books
- Publication date: September 28, 2010
- Media type: Paperback
- Pages: 384
- ISBN: 0778329631

Saving Max is the first novel written by American author Antoinette van Heugten. It was published by Mira Books in 2010. The novel is about attorney Danielle Parkman and her son Max, a teenager with Asperger syndrome who is accused of murdering another patient at a mental hospital. The novel addresses Munchausen syndrome by proxy as the villain murders her own son after subjecting him to a lifetime of abuse while glorying in the limelight of medical attention. The book spent two weeks in USA Today's list of the top 150 books, where it peaked at position 135. Saving Max has sold 500,000 copies.
