= The Rooster Bar =

John Grisham novel

- First edition (US)
- Author: John Grisham
- Language: English
- Genre: Legal thriller
- Publisher: Doubleday (US); Hodder & Stoughton (UK
- Publication date: October 24, 2017
- Publication place: United States
- ISBN: 978-0-385-54117-6

The Rooster Bar is the 25th legal thriller novel by John Grisham. Grisham was inspired to create the story after reading an article titled "The Law-School Scam" that appeared in The Atlantic magazine in 2014.

== Plot ==
Three third-year law students – Mark Frazier, Todd Lucero, and Zola Maal – all attend Foggy Bottom Law School (FBLS), a third-tier Washington establishment with a reputation as a diploma mill. Zola contacts Mark and Todd when her boyfriend, Gordon Tanner, stops taking medication for his worsening bipolar disorder.

The trio discover that Gordon, in his mania, has been collecting evidence that Hinds Rackley, the investor who owns FBLS, runs a network of schools, law firms and banks which ensures that FBLS' students are stuck in a cycle of debt while Rackley makes millions in the process. Although this practice isn't illegal, Gordon is convinced that there's enough for a class-action lawsuit that would, at the very least, expose Rackley's fraud. Later that night, Gordon gets drunk and flees the apartment, getting arrested for driving under the influence. The trio bail him out with the help of Darrell Crowley, a professional street lawyer, and Mark tries to find Gordon's doctor. Before he can, however, Gordon escapes again and commits suicide by jumping off a bridge.

Distraught, and blamed for Gordon's death by his family and friends, Mark and Todd realize that they have no future at FBLS; Mark's promised job at a D.C. firm is withdrawn, and both he and Todd drop out. The two get jobs at the Rooster Bar, a pub owned by Todd's boss, Maynard. Mark persuades Maynard to lease the two some office space, and they, together with Zola, set up an unlicensed firm called Upshaw, Parker and Lane (UPL). Inspired by Crowley, Mark and Todd decide to pose as lawyers under assumed identities and work the D.C. courts for clients, arguing to Zola that they can get rich while avoiding FBLS and their creditors, so long as no one discovers that they are engaged in a criminal enterprise. Uncertain, but aware that she also has nothing better to look forward to, Zola agrees to join them.

UPL is initially a success, with Mark and Todd winning several victories and collecting payouts while Zola attempts to expand their practice into personal injury, an area that none of them have any real expertise in. Seeking a quick payday, Mark agrees to file a lawsuit on behalf of Ramon Taper, a man whose newborn son died due to negligence on the part of the hospital. An expert assures Mark that his case is sound, and he refers it to another lawyer, Jeffrey Corbett, who informs Mark that he's been deceived: the statute of limitations on the case ran out while he was preparing it, meaning he and UPL could now be sued for malpractice by their client. With no other way out, Mark reluctantly informs Edwin Mossberg, the lawyer for Ramon's ex-wife, that he is not a lawyer and would therefore be ruined if the case were to proceed. Mossberg agrees to drop the suit but passes the information along to the D.C. bar. Meanwhile, Ramon, furious that Mark has stopped taking his calls, hires Crowley as his new attorney.

Mark, Todd, and Zola decide to focus their efforts on Swift Bank, one of Rackley's outfits, which will soon have to pay billions in settlements over charges that it defrauded its customers. By inventing thousands of fake clients and forwarding them to different firms involved in the settlement, the three bet that they can make enough money to flee the country just as the bar's investigation heats up. Maynard fires Mark and Todd to protect himself, and the police arrest them for practicing without licenses, though they are allowed to go free so long as they stay in town. In the middle of it all, Zola is forced to travel to Senegal after her immigrant parents are extorted by corrupt officials. Using $26,000 from UPL's account provided by Mark and Todd, she is able to hire a well-connected lawyer, Idina Sanga, who gets them released from custody. At the same time, Mark and Todd blackmail Rackley with Gordon's evidence to stop dragging his feet on the settlements. At Mark and Todd's trial, Crowley, Ramon, and many of their former clients cause a scene when they reveal the extent of UPL's misconduct.

Setting up a hedge fund in the Caribbean to handle their finances, Mark and Todd obtain fake passports and leave the United States just as evidence of their fraud allows Rackley to force a temporary halt to the settlements, but not before enough money is transferred to the fund to allow them to reunite with Zola in Senegal. With news that a grand jury has indicted all three on racketeering charges, Mark cuts several checks to pay off their law school debts as well as take care of their families. Knowing that they will never be able to return home, they assume false identities and purchase a bar to run, which they name the Rooster Bar.
