= The Whistler (novel) =

2016 novel by John Grisham

- First edition (US)
- Author: John Grisham
- Language: English
- Genre: Crime thriller
- Publisher: Doubleday (US); Hodder & Stoughton (UK)
- Publication date: October 25, 2016
- Publication place: United States
- Pages: 384 pp (Hardcover 1st edition)
- ISBN: 978-0385541190

The Whistler is a novel written by American author John Grisham. It was released in hardcover, large print paperback, e-book, compact disc audiobook and downloadable audiobook on October 25, 2016. It is a legal thriller centered on the character of Lacy Stoltz, a seasoned investigator for the fictional Florida Board on Judicial Conduct.

The plot centers on the legal and moral problems involved in Native American gaming. The (fictional) Tappacola Nation, a small Native American tribe located in the northern part of Florida, establishes a casino on their reservation, giving the tribe members an unprecedented economic affluence and a measure of compensation for their sufferings throughout centuries of European settlement, but also opening wide the potential for corruption and involvement with organized crime, up to and including outright murder.

== Plot ==
A mysterious source contacts the Florida Board on Judicial Conduct (BJC), promising information on the most corrupt judge in state history. Lacy Stoltz, the BJC's top investigator, is assigned to the case, and goes to St. Augustine with fellow investigator and former college football star Hugo Hatch to meet the source in person. The source is revealed to be a disbarred lawyer from Pensacola named Ramsey Mix, but he reveals that he changed his name to Greg Myers, and has been living out of his boat for several years.

Greg reveals that the judge is Claudia McDover of Florida's 24th Circuit. Over the course of almost two decades, Claudia has aided an organization known as the "Coast Mafia" in their use of a casino operated by the Tappacola Indian Nation as a mob front. Aside from skimming money from the casino, the mafia has also engaged in embezzlement and kickback schemes through real-estate developments, with any legal problems smoothed over by Claudia in exchange for bribes and lucrative condominium deals. A mob hitman had recently murdered Son Razko, a prominent member of the Tappacola Nation opposed to the casino, with Claudia then presiding over the trial that sentences his friend Junior Mace to death for the crime. Greg has been given this information by an intermediary representing an unknown mole close to Claudia, the titular "Whistler".

Lacy and Hugo's efforts to investigate the casino are uncovered by the mafia, who order a hit on them. Lacy and Hugo are lured to a remote part of the Tappacola reservation by a fake informant. Driving away from the uneventful meeting, they are deliberately struck head-on by a truck. Hugo is killed and Lacy is badly injured. This escalation convinces the director of the BJC, Michael Geismar, to contact the FBI. However, the up-and-coming mob lieutenant tasked with killing Hugo and Lacy left behind evidence at the scene and was caught on video at a nearby convenience store. With help from a former Tappacola Nation constable seeking to avenge Son Razko, Lacy and the FBI apprehend Hugo's killers and flip them, in the process gaining crucial evidence of the mafia's money laundering operations.

Claudia and the head of the mafia, Vonn Dubose, eventually realize that they have been betrayed; suspicion lands on Claudia's longtime court recorder, JoHelen Hooper, who turns out to be the Whistler. JoHelen escapes using a plan set up by Greg and hides in Panama City Beach, but only Lacy's intervention saves her from being murdered by Vonn's men. Both women retreat to a lakeside cabin in North Carolina for safety with the help of Lacy's brother Gunther while the FBI takes both Claudia and Vonn into custody. The FBI brings a case against the entire Coast Mafia using the RICO Act, Vonn is sentenced to death for Hugo's murder, Junior Mace is exonerated of murder charges, and Claudia gets twenty-five years in prison for bribery.

== TV adaptation ==
On January 19, 2021, Entertainment One was set to produce The Whistler as a one-hour TV series for TNT.

== See also ==
- Native American gaming
