= The Confession (novel) =

2010 legal thriller novel by John Grisham

- First edition cover
- Author: John Grisham
- Original title: The Confession
- Language: English
- Genre: Legal thriller
- Publisher: Doubleday (US), Century (UK)
- Publication date: 2010
- Publication place: United States
- Media type: Print (hardcover)
- Pages: 418 (hardcover 1st edition)
- ISBN: 978-1-84605-715-1

The Confession is a 2010 legal thriller novel by John Grisham, the second of two novels published in 2010. The novel is about the murder of a high school cheerleader and an innocent man's arrest for the crime. It was Grisham's first novel to be released simultaneously in digital and hardcover format.

== Plot ==
In 1998, Travis Boyette abducts and rapes Nicole "Nikki" Yarber, a teenage girl and high school student in Slone, Texas. He buries her body in Joplin, Missouri which is around six hours from Slone. He watches unfazed as the police arrest and convict Donte Drumm, a Black high school football player with no connection to the crime.

Despite his innocence, Drumm is convicted and sentenced to death. The story begins after he has been on death row for nine years. While Drumm serves his prison sentence, lawyer Robert "Robbie" Flak fights for his case. Meanwhile, Black Americans protest his false conviction.

In the meantime, Boyette is serving as a parolee in Kansas. He has been suffering from a brain tumor for the past nine years, and his health has deteriorated. In 2007, with Drumm's execution only a week away, reflecting on his miserable life, he decides to do what is right: confess to carrying out the rape. He meets with a pastor, Reverend Keith Schroeder who takes him to Slone. Despite his public confession, the execution proceeds, and Drumm is executed by lethal injection.

The town is beset by racial tension, though a riot is averted. Boyette then reveals the resting place of Nikki, and DNA samples show signs of rape and assault on her body. Before an arrest warrant is issued for him, however, he absconds. In Slone, Flak leads legal attacks on those responsible for the false conviction and execution, while the Reverend Schroeder agonizes over what he has done: taken a paroled convicted rapist—and probable murderer—out of his parole zone (the state of Kansas). Schroeder winds up making his actions public, paying a fine, resigning from his church, and accepting a position at a reform-minded church in Texas. The latter happens after Boyette is caught attempting another rape.

== List of characters ==
=== Donté Drumm ===
Donte's ordeal begins as a privileged and fortunate 17-year-old. He has only had mild altercations with law enforcement for possession of marijuana during youth. Now he is a star on the high school football team and loved by the female population of his school. His potential develops jealousy in Joey Gamble who, when rejected by Nicole, takes this out on Donte. Gamble tips off the police with an anonymous phone call, later proven to be his by the use of voice analysis. When the police take Donte in for questioning, Donte naively—but in good faith—signs away his Miranda rights. From then on, he is put on death row for the next nine years and ultimately executed.

=== Roberta Drumm ===
Donte's mother who is convinced her son is innocent and prays constantly for a reprieve. She is part of a large family. Her husband and Donte's father, Riley Drumm, dies of heart disease while Donte is on death row.

=== Nicole "Nikki" Yarber ===
The girl whose brutal rape and suspected murder led to capital murder charges, a crime which, upon conviction, can lead to the death penalty in the state of Texas.

=== Reeva Pike ===
Nicole Yarber's mother. Reeva is loud-mouthed, irrational, and theatrical in her behavior. She had been known to drive more than a hundred miles downriver to where it was speculated her daughter's body may have been dumped. She is adamant that the death penalty is right and is happy to tell anyone who will listen. Reeva lives with her second husband, who is not Nicole's father (Nicole has two half siblings from Reeva's second marriage) and who seems exasperated with Reeva's nine years of agony.

=== Travis Boyette ===
The real killer who had actually been in police custody in Slone at the same time Donté was detained. He is a serial rapist who was himself abused from the age of eight by an uncle who told his parent or guardian that they were going "fishing." He claims to be suffering from terminal brain cancer and carries a cane because of an apparent limp.

It turns out the tumor is not malignant, and the cane is there for protection in his halfway house. His seizures and intense headaches, however, are real. He has spent more than half of his 44 years in prison. His creepy behavior remains apparent to others, notably the number of occasions in which he states to Reverend Schroeder how he thinks his wife Dana is "cute."

=== Robbie Flak ===
The heir to the Flak law firm who works tirelessly for his clients. He makes a promise to Donté minutes before his execution that he would find the real killer and exonerate him for the sake of his family. Later, he throws a party at his graveside. Robbie works diligently for his clients on death row and files every possible motion to appeal. He does not consider his job finished until he has sued everyone responsible for Donté's wrongful execution, even those parties with immunity from prosecution. Outside of law, Robbie does not seem to have much social life, and both he and his romantic partner are happy to keep their work lives separate. Robbie is not particularly religious; nonetheless, is invited by the Black community of Slone to speak at Donté's funeral.

=== Reverend Keith Schroeder ===
The Kansas-based Lutheran pastor who assists in the transportation of a convicted felon across state lines. Schroeder strives to see the best in all people and emphasizes forgiveness. He has a strong sense of scruples and battles with himself to discern in complex situations what is the right thing. He is seen toward the end of the book trying to bring out Donté's past belief in God when all hope for a last-minute reprieve from the governor has been abandoned. Keith is married to Dana, who is substituting for his regular secretary at the Mission on the day Boyette first meets Keith. Eventually, his involvement in an illegal act, however justified, gets him in trouble with his bishop, but he is welcomed by a more socially active Lutheran congregation in Texas and becomes a committed opponent of the death penalty.

=== Judge Elias Henry ===
Judge Henry is the only character who has a good relationship with Robbie. He is well-respected, although in the past, he lost out in politics and suffered a nervous breakdown. He wrote numerous articles during the Civil rights movement of the 1960s and was considered to be a little radical among the Whites of Texas during that period. He always considers the Donté case to be thoroughly flawed and states that he would have thrown it out at trial had he been on the bench at the time. Judge Henry lives with his wife.

=== Joey Gamble ===
Gamble's false testimony is crucial in the prosecution's case against Donté. He was jealous of Donté and wanted the death of the girl he was romantically interested in to be blamed on Donté. He assumed that the police would dismiss the case. At the last minute, he agrees to sign an affidavit recanting his testimony and admitting he committed perjury, but it is too late.

=== Detective Drew Kerber ===
The detective who arrested and questioned Donté during the case. Despite countless innocent protests from Donté, he persists in shouting and angrily accusing him during their conversations. He eventually obtains a false confession from Donté through shouting and trickery, although it is implied that he may have even beaten Donté, since he is found lying on the floor weeping by the end of Kerber's questioning. During Robbie Flak's press conference, it is mentioned that he has a "history of false confessions," implying that many other confessions may have been wrongly obtained by him.

=== Prosecutor Paul Koffee ===
The prosecutor presiding over the Nicole Yarber case. Both he and Kerber are unrelenting and ultimately successful in their attempt to convict Donté with false evidence and false testimony. The possibility of Donté being innocent never seems to occur to Paul, as he only cared about his legal reputation which has been badly damaged since his scandal with Judge Vivian Grale was publicly revealed. He even asserts that Donté may have had an "accomplice" once Nicole's body is found, all in an effort to save his reputation.

=== Gill Newton ===
The governor of Texas. A supporter of capital punishment who refuses to postpone the execution even after seeing Travis' televised confession. Once he learns of Donté's innocence, he feigns ignorance of seeing Travis' confession and desperately attempts to settle matters in the Middle East as an excuse to leave the country. Like Koffee, Kerber, and Judge Vivian Grale, he too only cares about his reputation and does not acknowledge Donté as an innocent man despite the violent riots which erupt on the streets of Slone and the abundance of evidence indicating Donté's innocence.

== Critical reception ==
Chris Erskine writing in the Los Angeles Times reviewed the novel favorably, commenting on Grisham's deft ability at pacing in his novels.

Writing in the Religious Left Law blog, David Nickol was adversely critical of the novel for not doing what it set out, presumably, to achieve, (i.e. to present a firm case against the death-penalty through the medium of fiction). Its failings, he said, derive from the fact that the events of the Donte's case "are so egregious that...[o]ne does not need to be a death-penalty opponent to find repugnant the blatant railroading of someone so clearly innocent".

Maureen Corrigan in the Washington Post reviewed the novel in terms of the way in which Grisham gets across a message to the reader about his own views on the death penalty deriving from his work on the Innocence Project. This and the race issue that divides the community in Texas between Blacks and Whites is described by Corrigan as Grisham's "superb work of social criticism". Corrigan, however, does not consider the book to be easy reading: "don't read this book if you just want to kick back in your recliner and relax," she writes, "Grisham doesn't spare his readers or himself from gruesome experiences or hard questions."

Natahniel Roward in "The Long Road to Death Penalty Abolition" noted that "Grisham drives home dramatically one of the major arguments used by the opponents of capital punishment: that an execution is completely irreversible. When the proof of innocence is found after the condemned prisoner had been put to death, it is too late. (...) Of course, it is very rare for the proof of innocence to be found on the very next day after an innocent man was executed. Grisham's best literary feat is to create a scenario where this is plausible - due to the quirky and unpredictable personality of the real killer, whose vacillation on coming out with his confession lasts just twenty-four hours too long. (...) The bitter ending, with cynical Texas politicians deciding to go ahead with capital punishments despite such a clear and manifest evidence of their wrongness, is the kind of disappointment with which all opponents of capital punishment are all too familiar in the real world".

== Relations between novel and real-life cases ==
Much of the fictional case presented in the novel is taken from some real-life cases involving defendants on death row. The impropriety of a prosecutor and a judge sleeping together allegedly occurred in the case of Charles D. Hood. Also, a late petition to the TCCA that was denied because the doors had been locked and that the chief justice (Milton Prudlowe in the novel) had refused an extension happened in the case of Michael Wayne Richard.

Donte's last statement is partly derived from the actual last statement of Cameron Todd Willingham, as is the dubious science used to convict him (a sniffer dog). Donte himself refers directly to the Willingham case in talking about how inmates die: “Some don’t say a word, just close their eyes and wait for the poison. A few go out kicking. Todd Willingham died three years ago, always claimed to be innocent. They said he started a house fire that burned up his three little girls. Yet he was in the house and got burned too. He was a fighter. He cussed ’em in his final statement.”

Grisham had researched and written a book about a real-life case of an innocent person wrongfully sentenced to death (The Innocent Man) and many details of Donte's police investigation and trial, as well as the psychological effects of his years on Death Row, are clearly inspired by that case. The actual case was in Oklahoma, and proof of innocence came in time to save him.

The novel also mentions several real-life murderers as having been executed in 1999, who in real life were executed on the dates stated in the novel: Desmond Jennings, John Lamb, Jose Guiterrez, James Beathard, Robert Atworth, and Sammie Felder Jr. (See List of people executed in Texas, 1990–1999)
