= List of The New York Times number-one books of 2017 =

The American daily newspaper The New York Times publishes multiple weekly lists ranking the best-selling books in the United States. The lists are split into three genres—fiction, nonfiction and children's books. Both the fiction and nonfiction lists are further split into multiple lists.

== Changes to the list ==
Beginning on February 5, 2017, The New York Times introduced revisions to multiple categories in the publication. The revisions included the elimination of the graphic novel/manga and the mass market paperback lists as well as the middle grade e-book and young adult e-book lists.

== Fiction ==
The following list ranks the number-one best-selling fiction books, in the combined print and e-books category. The most frequent weekly best seller of the year is Camino Island by John Grisham with 5 weeks at the top of the list, followed by The Shack by William P. Young with 4 weeks.

Date	Book	Author
January 1	The Whistler	John Grisham
January 8	The Whistler	John Grisham
January 15	The Wrong Side of Goodbye	Michael Connelly
January 22	The Mistress	Danielle Steel
January 29	A Dog's Purpose	W. Bruce Cameron
February 5	Never Never	James Patterson and Candice Fox
February 12	A Dog's Purpose	W. Bruce Cameron
February 19	Right Behind You	Lisa Gardner
February 26	Echoes in Death	J. D. Robb
March 5	Heartbreak Hotel	Jonathan Kellerman
March 12	The Shack	William P. Young
March 19	The Shack	William P. Young
March 26	The Shack	William P. Young
April 2	The Shack	William P. Young
April 9	Mississippi Blood	Greg Iles
April 16	The Black Book	James Patterson and David Ellis
April 23	The Chosen	J. R. Ward
April 30	The Black Book	James Patterson and David Ellis
May 7	The Fix	David Baldacci
May 14	Golden Prey	John Sandford
May 21	16th Seduction	James Patterson and Maxine Paetro
May 28	Into the Water	Paula Hawkins
June 4	Into the Water	Paula Hawkins
June 11	Into the Water	Paula Hawkins
June 18	Come Sundown	Nora Roberts
June 25	Camino Island	John Grisham
July 2	Camino Island	John Grisham
July 9	Camino Island	John Grisham
July 16	Camino Island	John Grisham
July 23	Camino Island	John Grisham
July 30	House of Spies	Daniel Silva
August 6	The Late Show	Michael Connelly
August 13	The Late Show	Michael Connelly
August 20	The Medical Examiner	James Patterson and Maxine Paetro
August 27	Any Dream Will Do	Debbie Macomber
September 3	Seeing Red	Sandra Brown
September 10	"Y" Is for Yesterday	Sue Grafton
September 17	Glass Houses	Louise Penny
September 24	Secrets in Death	J. D. Robb
October 1	A Column of Fire	Ken Follett
October 8	The Cuban Affair	Nelson DeMille
October 15	Sleeping Beauties	Stephen King and Owen King
October 22	Origin	Dan Brown
October 29	Origin	Dan Brown
November 5	Origin	Dan Brown
November 12	The Rooster Bar	John Grisham
November 19	Two Kinds of Truth	Michael Connelly
November 26	The Midnight Line	Lee Child
December 3	Hardcore Twenty-Four	Janet Evanovich
December 10	The People vs. Alex Cross	James Patterson
December 17	Darker: Fifty Shades Darker as Told by Christian	E. L. James
December 24	Year One	Nora Roberts
December 31	The Rooster Bar	John Grisham

== Nonfiction ==
The following list ranks the number-one best-selling nonfiction books, in the combined print and e-books category. The most frequent weekly best seller of the year was The Glass Castle by Jeannette Walls with seven weeks at the top of the list.

Date	Book	Author	Publisher
January 1	Killing the Rising Sun	Bill O'Reilly and Martin Dugard	Holt
January 8	Killing the Rising Sun	Bill O'Reilly and Martin Dugard	Holt
January 15	The Princess Diarist	Carrie Fisher	Blue Rider Press
January 22	Hillbilly Elegy	JD Vance	HarperCollins
January 29	Hidden Figures	Margot Lee Shetterly	Morrow/HarperCollins
February 5	Hidden Figures	Margot Lee Shetterly	Morrow/HarperCollins
February 12	Hidden Figures	Margot Lee Shetterly	Morrow/HarperCollins
February 19	Hidden Figures	Margot Lee Shetterly	Morrow/HarperCollins
February 26	Hidden Figures	Margot Lee Shetterly	Morrow/HarperCollins
March 5	Hillbilly Elegy	JD Vance	HarperCollins
March 12	Hidden Figures	Margot Lee Shetterly	Morrow/HarperCollins
March 19	Portraits of Courage	George W. Bush	Crown
March 26	Portraits of Courage	George W. Bush	Crown
March 16	How to Be a Bawse: A Guide to Conquering Life	Lilly Singh	Ballantine
April 2	Hillbilly Elegy	JD Vance	HarperCollins
April 9	The Zookeeper's Wife	Diane Ackerman	Norton
April 16	Old School: Life in the Sane Lane	Bill O'Reilly and Bruce Feirstein	Holt
April 23	Old School: Life in the Sane Lane	Bill O'Reilly and Bruce Feirstein	Holt
April 30	Old School: Life in the Sane Lane	Bill O'Reilly and Bruce Feirstein	Holt
May 7	Shattered	Jonathan Allen and Amie Parnes	Crown
May 14	Option B	Sheryl Sandberg and Adam Grant	Knopf
May 21	Astrophysics for People in a Hurry	Neil deGrasse Tyson	Norton
May 28	Astrophysics for People in a Hurry	Neil deGrasse Tyson	Norton
June 4	Astrophysics for People in a Hurry	Neil deGrasse Tyson	Norton
June 11	Astrophysics for People in a Hurry	Neil deGrasse Tyson	Norton
June 18	Al Franken, Giant of the Senate	Al Franken	Twelve
June 25	I Can't Make This Up	Kevin Hart and Neil Strauss	37 INK
July 2	Understanding Trump	Newt Gingrich	Center Street
July 9	Hillbilly Elegy	JD Vance	HarperCollins
July 16	Hillbilly Elegy	JD Vance	HarperCollins
July 23	Rediscovering Americanism	Mark Levin	Simon & Schuster
July 30	Hillbilly Elegy	JD Vance	HarperCollins
August 6	Devil's Bargain	Joshua Green	Penguin Press
August 13	The Glass Castle	Jeannette Walls	Scribner
August 20	The Glass Castle	Jeannette Walls	Scribner
August 27	The Glass Castle	Jeannette Walls	Scribner
September 3	The Glass Castle	Jeannette Walls	Scribner
September 10	The Glass Castle	Jeannette Walls	Scribner
September 17	The Glass Castle	Jeannette Walls	Scribner
September 24	The Glass Castle	Jeannette Walls	Scribner
October 1	What Happened	Hillary Clinton	Simon & Schuster
October 8	What Happened	Hillary Clinton	Simon & Schuster
October 15	Killing England	Bill O'Reilly and Martin Dugard	Holt
October 22	Killing England	Bill O'Reilly and Martin Dugard	Holt
October 29	Grant	Ron Chernow	Penguin Press
November 5	Leonardo Da Vinci	Walter Isaacson	Simon & Schuster
November 12	Sisters First	Jenna Bush Hager and Barbara Pierce Bush	Grand Central
November 19	Leonardo Da Vinci	Walter Isaacson	Simon & Schuster
November 26	Obama: An Intimate Portrait	Pete Souza	Little, Brown
December 3	Promise Me, Dad	Joe Biden	Flatiron Books
December 10	Leonardo Da Vinci	Walter Isaacson	Simon & Schuster
December 17	Leonardo Da Vinci	Walter Isaacson	Simon & Schuster
December 24	Leonardo Da Vinci	Walter Isaacson	Simon & Schuster
December 31	Leonardo Da Vinci	Walter Isaacson	Simon & Schuster

== See also ==
- Publishers Weekly list of bestselling novels in the United States in the 2010s
