= Kissinger: A Biography =

1992 book by Walter Isaacson

- First edition hardcover image
- Author: Walter Isaacson
- Language: English
- Subject: Henry Kissinger
- Published: 1992
- Publisher: Simon & Schuster
- Publication place: United States
- Pages: 893

Kissinger: A Biography is a non-fiction book authored by American historian and journalist Walter Isaacson. Published by Simon & Schuster in 1992, the biographical analysis of prominent public official Henry Kissinger has received positive reviews from publications such as Foreign Affairs and The New York Times.

== Background and contents ==
The author had previously served as a journalist with Time and become one of that magazine's editors as well as co-written, with Evan Thomas, the Cold War chronicle The Wise Men.

Isaacson started out writing the book with considerable personal access not only to Kissinger himself but to multiple associates of the public figure. The author additionally used a wide variety of political documents from Kissinger's many years of public service. Despite this close association, Isaacson insisted on maintaining his independence over the final work. One reviewer later noted that the book constituted the first "full-scale biography of the former secretary of state that examines not only his public life and policy but his origins and his activities since leaving office."

In broad terms, the author states that Kissinger's promotion of particular foreign policies, including aggressive regime change efforts in different nations, contributed to a general victory for the Western bloc during the Cold War. However, Isaacson finds that Kissinger significantly moved away from previously held ethical ideals and severely compromised America's world standing as well, with said foreign efforts undermining the cause of democratic government and human rights. The author views Kissinger as having achieved the American dream and amassed considerable power at the expense of not just intellectual honesty but general personal character.

== Reception ==
Historian and journalist Theodore Draper of The New York Times wrote that for Kissinger "aficionados" the book "makes [for] compulsive reading" and that "for students of his years of influence on United States foreign policy" the book becomes "compulsory". Remarking upon Kissinger's willingness to assist Isaacson with research as well as the official's lack of insistence on controlling the final product, Draper commented, "Cooperating with Mr. Isaacson may come to seem one of his greatest miscalculations." Writing for Foreign Affairs, journalist and public official William G. Hyland praised the book as well. Hyland stated that Isaacson possessed a style "with an engaging flair" while still having achieved "a balanced objectivity".

Reporter Peter Jennings of ABC News commented that the book "[c]onfirms Kissinger's place as one of the great international players" yet "takes him down a peg as well". Jennings additionally stated that it "makes for compulsive reading."

Jonathan Kwitny of the Los Angeles Times stated that "his (Isaacson's) lack of speculation, his tireless, hard-to-argue-with reporting, always coupled with his sense of what a mass audience needs in the way of entertainment in order to stay glued, makes this a great contribution to the history of our times."

== See also ==
- 1992 in literature
