= Leonardo da Vinci (Isaacson book) =

Non-fiction book by Walter Isaacson

- Author: Walter Isaacson
- Language: English
- Genre: Biography
- Publisher: Simon & Schuster
- Publication date: 2017
- Pages: 624 pp.
- ISBN: 9781501139161

Leonardo da Vinci is a 2017 biography of Italian polymath Leonardo da Vinci. The book was written by Walter Isaacson, a journalist, biographer and former executive at CNN and president of the Aspen Institute.

== Contents ==
The book details Leonardo's life, paintings, notebooks, work on maths, science and anatomy, and his sexuality. It focuses primarily on his notebooks but also covers his paintings. The book tackles the controversies surrounding the attribution of the paintings La Bella Principessa and Salvator Mundi to Leonardo. Isaacson has stated that the book does not contain any new discoveries about Leonardo. At the end of the book, Isaacson gives a list of lessons to be learned from Leonardo's life. An example is "be curious, relentlessly curious". The front cover has the portrait of Leonardo held at the Uffizi Museum.

== Reception ==
The book became a number-one New York Times Best Seller on its 2017 list. Robin McKie of The Guardian described the book as "sumptuous, elegantly written and diligently produced". Bill Gates, who owns Leonardo's Codex Leicester, wrote "I've read a lot about Leonardo over the years, but I had never found one book that satisfactorily covered all the different facets of his life and work." Joshua Kim of Inside Higher Ed theorized that the $450 million sale price of Leonardo's painting Salvator Mundi in November 2017 may have been influenced by the book. Jennifer Senior of the New York Times wrote:

I'm not sure the role of art critic suits him. Isaacson's enthusiasm is admirable, but he hails many of Leonardo's creations in the same breathless tone with which a teenager might greet a new Apple product. The words "brilliant," "wondrous" and "ingenious" come up a lot.

Senior also criticized Isaacson's "Learning from Leonardo" summary at the end of the book, describing it as a form of "TED-ism". When comparing Isaacson's book to Mike Lankford's Becoming Leonardo (2017), Daniel J. Levitin of the Wall Street Journal wrote, "Mr. Isaacson's book feels cobbled together, as if written on deadline, while Mr. Lankford seems to have taken all the time he needed." Alexander C. Kafka of the Washington Post wrote:

Isaacson's approach, true to his background, is fundamentally journalistic. No intellectual peacocking for him, and though his writing is certainly graceful, it is never needlessly ornate. But make no mistake: He knows his stuff ...

== Film adaptation ==
In August 2017, Paramount outbid Universal Pictures for the rights to turn the book into a film. It was decided that Leonardo DiCaprio (who is named after the polymath) would play Leonardo da Vinci. This did not work out, so Universal bought the rights to it in 2023. (Universal had adapted Isaacson's 2011 biography of Steve Jobs into a film in 2015.) Andrew Haigh was chosen to direct the Leonardo film.
