= Reality distortion field =

Use of charisma to affect the perceptions of others

Reality distortion field (RDF) is a term first used by Bud Tribble at Apple Computer in 1981, to describe company co-founder Steve Jobs's charisma and its effects on the developers working on the Macintosh project. Tribble said that the term came from Star Trek, where it is used to describe how the aliens encountered by the crew of the starship USS Enterprise created their own new world through mental force. (Note: This comes from the episode The Menagerie from the original series.)

== Steve Jobs ==
In the book Steve Jobs, biographer Walter Isaacson states that around 1972, while Jobs was attending Reed College, Robert Friedland "taught Steve the reality distortion field." The RDF was said by Andy Hertzfeld to be Jobs's ability to convince himself, and others around him, to believe almost anything with a mix of charm, charisma, bravado, hyperbole, marketing, appeasement and persistence. It was said to distort his co-workers' sense of proportion and scales of difficulties and to make them believe that whatever impossible task he had at hand was possible. Jobs could also use the reality distortion field to appropriate others' ideas as his own, sometimes proposing an idea back to its originator, only a week after dismissing it.

The term has been used to refer to Jobs's keynote speeches (or "Stevenotes") by observers and devoted users of Apple computers and products, and derisively by Apple's competitors in criticisms of Apple, for example a post on Research In Motion's official BlackBerry blog titled "RIM Responds to Apple's 'Distortion Field'".

Bill Gates talked in an interview about Steve Jobs using his reality distortion field to "cast spells" on people. Gates considered himself immune to Jobs's reality distortion field, saying, "I was like a minor wizard because he would be casting spells, and I would see people mesmerized, but because I'm a minor wizard, the spells don't work on me."

== Other instances ==
The term has been extended, with a mixture of awe and scorn, to other managers and leaders in industry who try to convince their employees to become passionately committed to projects without regard to their overall difficulty or to competitive forces in the market. It is sometimes used with regard to excessively hyped products that are not necessarily connected with any one person.

- Bill Clinton's charisma has been called a reality distortion field.
- The "Jedi Mind Trick" in Star Wars: A New Hope is almost identical to the operation of the RDF
- The chess champion Bobby Fischer was said to have a "Fischer aura" surrounding him that disoriented Boris Spassky and other opponents.
- The term has been also associated with Donald Trump's approach to running his 2016 campaign for United States President and his presidency.
- Financial Times used the term when describing Elon Musk.
- WeWork founder Adam Neumann has been described as having a reality distortion field.
- A parody of a reality distortion field appeared in a 2010 Dilbert strip in which a reality distortion field emitter is used during a keynote speech by Dogbert.
- Columnist Yen Makabenta of The Manila Times opined that Rodrigo Duterte's rise to prominence and appeal to the masses—in spite of allegations of human rights violations and Duterte's obscene remarks towards individuals and organizations such as the Roman Catholic Church, which the Philippines has a significant population of adherents—have generated a reality distortion field. He added that while Duterte's vulgar and sexually charged comments during his presidential campaign have alarmed many and were initially seen as detrimental to his victory as a presidential candidate, he exhibited charisma which accounted for why people still campaigned for him in spite of this behavior.

== See also ==
- Brainwashing
- Charismatic authority
- Gaslighting
- Locus of control
- Magical thinking
- Suggestibility
- Suspension of disbelief
