= The Innovators (book) =

2014 book by Walter Isaacson

The Innovators: How a Group of Hackers, Geniuses, and Geeks Created the Digital Revolution
- Author: Walter Isaacson
- Language: English
- Genre: Biography
- Publisher: Simon & Schuster
- Publication date: October 7, 2014
- Publication place: United States
- Media type: E-book, print (hardback and paperback), audiobook
- Pages: 488
- ISBN: 1-4767-0869-X
- OCLC: 876012030
- Preceded by: Steve Jobs
- Followed by: Leonardo Da Vinci

The Innovators: How a Group of Hackers, Geniuses, and Geeks Created the Digital Revolution is an overview of the history of computer science and the Digital Revolution. It was written by Walter Isaacson, and published in 2014 by Simon & Schuster.

The book summarizes the contributions of several innovators who have made pivotal breakthroughs in computer technology and its applications—from the world's first computer programmer, Ada Lovelace, and Alan Turing's work in artificial intelligence, through the Information Age of the present.

== Corrections ==
In December 2015, Simon & Schuster published a revised electronic edition of The Innovators, which corrected significant errors and omissions in the original edition's Chapter 9, which covers software. Isaacson – who in researching the book interviewed Bill Gates but not Paul Allen – had assigned virtually all credit for the company's early innovations and success to Gates, when in fact they were the product of highly collaborative efforts by several people, including Allen. In the revised edition, among other edits, Isaacson includes archival material from 1981 which Gates credits Allen for being the "idea man" in charge of R&D at Microsoft, while he, Gates, was "the frontman running the business".

In the 2019 three-part Netflix docuseries Inside Bill's Brain: Decoding Bill Gates, this conflict is briefly mentioned by who appears to be Gates's secretary as she goes over the books that Gates was reading at the time of recording.

Isaacson explains in his book that, as he was writing about Wikipedia and how it worked, he decided that his book should be collectively examined in a Wikipedia manner. Hence he uploaded a draft on Medium, allowing readers to make dozens of comments to correct and improve the book.

== Innovators by chapter ==
Innovators discussed in the book by chapter:

- Chapter 1 – Ada, Countess of Lovelace:
  - Charles Babbage, Ada Lovelace
- Chapter 2 – The Computer:
  - Herman Hollerith, Vannevar Bush, Konrad Zuse, Alan Turing, George Stibitz, Claude Shannon, Howard Aiken, John Atanasoff, John Mauchly, J. Presper Eckert
- Chapter 3 – Programming:
  - Grace Hopper, Richard Bloch, Jean Jennings, John von Neumann
- Chapter 4 – The Transistor:
  - John Bardeen, William Shockley, Walter Brattain, Patrick Haggerty, Robert Noyce, Gordon Moore
- Chapter 5 – The Microchip:
  - Jack Kilby, Arthur Rock, Andy Grove, Ted Hoff, Jean Hoerni
- Chapter 6 – Video Games:
  - Steve Russell, Nolan Bushnell
- Chapter 7 – The Internet:
  - J. C. R. Licklider, Robert Taylor, Larry Roberts, Paul Baran, Donald Davies, Leonard Kleinrock, Vint Cerf, Bob Kahn
- Chapter 8 – The Personal Computer:
  - Ken Kesey, Stewart Brand, Doug Engelbart, Alan Kay, Lee Felsenstien, Ed Roberts
- Chapter 9 – Software:
  - Paul Allen, Bill Gates, Steve Wozniak, Steve Jobs, Richard Stallman, Linus Torvalds, Dan Bricklin
- Chapter 10 – Online
  - William von Meister, Steve Case, Al Gore
- Chapter 11 – The Web
  - Tim Berners-Lee, Marc Andreessen, Justin Hall, Ev Williams, Ward Cunningham, Jimmy Wales, Larry Page, Sergey Brin
- Chapter 12 – Ada Forever

== See also ==
- 2014 in literature
