= Elon Musk (Isaacson book) =

2023 authorized biography by Walter Isaacson

- First edition cover
- Author: Walter Isaacson
- Audio read by: Jeremy Bobb
- Language: English
- Subject: Elon Musk
- Genre: Biography
- Publisher: Simon & Schuster
- Publication date: September 12, 2023
- Publication place: New York
- Media type: Print (hardcover), e-book, audiobook
- Pages: 688 pp.
- ISBN: 978-1-982181-28-4 (First edition hardcover)

Elon Musk is an authorized biography of Elon Musk. The book was written by Walter Isaacson, a former executive at CNN, TIME and the Aspen Institute who had previously written best-selling biographies of Benjamin Franklin, Albert Einstein, Steve Jobs and Leonardo da Vinci. The book was published on September 12, 2023, by Simon & Schuster.

== Background ==
Elon Musk first announced that Isaacson was in the process of writing his biography in August 2021. He revealed that Isaacson had shadowed him "for several days so far".

Isaacson followed Musk for the next two years, visiting his SpaceX and Tesla factories and attending board meetings. The book is the result of hours of interviews with Musk and his family, friends, colleagues and adversaries. Isaacson was present when Musk decided to buy Twitter and to run his new AI company; Musk also shared messages from the Ukrainian minister Mykhailo Fedorov, and some were included in the book. Isaacson later said in an interview that "Elon is very mercurial, but he never told me not to put anything in the book."

== Contents ==
Isaacson writes that Musk is "addicted to drama".

=== Crimean Starlink coverage deactivation claim ===
Among the book's revelations was an account that Musk ordered Starlink to disable access to Ukrainian drones in 2022, during the Russian invasion of Ukraine, thwarting an attack on Russian warships in Crimea. Musk denied the allegation, saying satellites in the region were not turned on, and that he chose not to activate them. The biography claim prompted several allegations against Musk for deliberately disrupting the operation. Isaacson later retracted his claim as a mistake, as Crimea had no Starlink coverage prior to the attack similarly to other Russian-occupied territories of Ukraine.

The Washington Post, which had published Isaacson's opinion piece, corrected that "after the publication of this adaptation, the author learned that his book mischaracterized the attempted attack by Ukrainian drones on the Russian fleet in Crimea. Musk had already disabled ("geofenced") coverage within 100 km of the Crimean coast before the attack began, and when the Ukrainians discovered this, they asked him to activate the coverage, and he refused." The Guardian and CNN also added a footnote to correct the claim.

Isaacson corrected his claim and clarified that Elon Musk said that the policy to not allow Starlink to be used for an attack on Crimea had been implemented earlier than the night of the Ukrainian attack, while Ukrainians did not know about it. Ukrainian general Kyrylo Budanov declared being "not sure that Elon Musk operated some mythical buttons and stopped the movement of some devices. This is my personal opinion. The fact that the Starlink systems did not work for a certain time near the Crimea, I can absolutely confirm, because we also used a certain technique. We immediately realized that there is simply no coverage there".

== Reception ==
Ahead of its publication, the book topped Amazon's bestseller list. It debuted at number one on The New York Times nonfiction best-seller list for the week ending September 16, 2023.

The New York Times critic Jennifer Szalai wrote, "Isaacson [...] is a patient chronicler of obsession; in the case of Musk, he can occasionally seem too patient."

Brian Merchant of the Los Angeles Times criticized Isaacson's "great man" biography format as extremely dated and took issue with his persistent framing of Musk as a "moody but brilliant world-mover", writing, "The author will unearth unflattering personal anecdotes and share stories about the subject's capacity to be cruel. In exchange, the subject's greatness will be treated as an assumption."

In The Guardian, Gary Shteyngart called the book a "dull, insight-free doorstop", and criticized the author, writing, "I held Isaacson's judgment in low regard. Vaccine sceptic Joe Rogan is 'knowledgeable'. Musk's humour – he took the 'w' out of the Twitter sign in San Francisco because 'tit' is so inherently funny – has 'many levels'. Linda Yaccarino, Musk's almost comically bumbling CEO of X-nee-Twitter is 'wickedly smart'."

Constance Grady of Vox also criticized the book. While writing that it is "strictly a book of reportage" and that "[Isaacson's] reporting is rigorous and dogged", the reviewer noted that the book "asks all the wrong questions".

Jill Lepore of The New Yorker wrote that "Isaacson's new biography depicts a man who wields more power than almost any other person on the planet but seems estranged from humanity itself". The reviewer found the book's ending a "disconcerting thing to read":

"Sometimes great innovators are risk-seeking man-children who resist potty training," Isaacson concludes in the last lines of his life of Musk. "They can be reckless, cringeworthy, sometimes even toxic. They can also be crazy. Crazy enough to think they can change the world."

The Verge critic Elizabeth Lopatto criticized the book and Isaacson, writing that on the subject of the lack of sourcing for the allegations of Starlink being shut off, that more interviews could have been held but that "Isaacson chose not to" and "rolled over" on social media when Musk contested, while also stating that Isaacson did not dig deeper and left out details to "keep Musk's myth intact".

=== Criticism by Vivian Wilson ===
In an interview with NBC News, Vivian Wilson, Musk's estranged oldest child, criticized the book as inaccurate and unfair to her, describing her as a "radical Marxist", which she refutes, and referring to her as "Jenna". Isaacson sourced his claim from Christiana Musk, the wife of Elon's brother Kimbal Musk, but never contacted Vivian before printing the claims. Isaacson said he had reached out to her through family members.

In a series of posts on Threads in August, Wilson said that Isaacson never reached out to her, and described the book as "genuinely defamatory", saying that it deliberately avoided including any testimony by her; in favor of trivializing her trans identity and misconstruing her reasons for separation to make her appear as being "naive", "stupid", and "an irredeemable human being" in order to frame her existence as "a villain-origin backstory" for her father's rightwards political shift.

Teen Vogue later described its portrayal of Wilson as "an angry, rebellious child, blinded by radical anticapitalist ideology and hurting her father with her rash decisions", and when questioned about it, Wilson stated that "He had an agenda when writing his book, which was to make Elon look good, or look more complex than he is. In order to do that, he needed to villainize the trans teenager and make it seem like there were two reasonable sides to the story".

== Film adaptation ==
On November 10, 2023, it was announced that A24 had purchased the film rights for an adaptation to be directed by Darren Aronofsky.

== See also ==
- Elon Musk: Tesla, SpaceX, and the Quest for a Fantastic Future, 2015 biography of Musk
- Ludicrous: The Unvarnished Story of Tesla Motors, 2019 nonfiction book about Musk's management of Tesla
- Power Play: Tesla, Elon Musk, and the Bet of the Century, 2021 nonfiction book about Musk's management of Tesla
