= John Urschel =

Canadian mathematician and gridiron football player (born 1991)

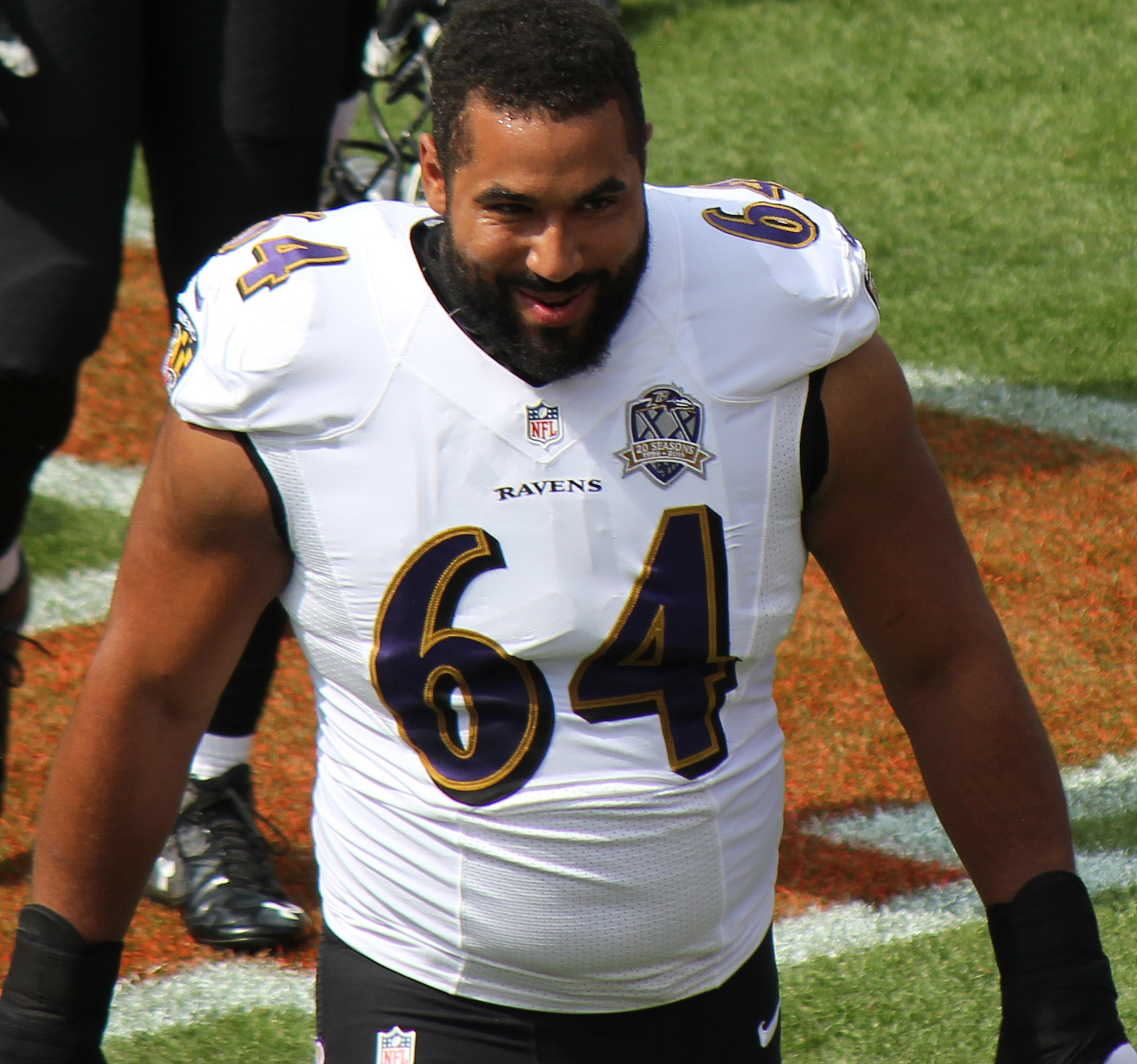
- Urschel with the Baltimore Ravens in 2015
- Born: June 24, 1991 (age 35); Winnipeg, Manitoba, Canada
- Education: Pennsylvania State University (BS, MA); Massachusetts Institute of Technology (PhD)
- Occupation: Professor
- Years active: 2023–present
- Spouse: Louisa Thomas
- Scientific career
- Fields: Mathematics
- Workplaces: Massachusetts Institute of Technology; Institute for Advanced Study
- Thesis: Graphs, Principal Minors, and Eigenvalue Problems (2021)
- Doctoral advisor: Michel Goemans
- Football career

Personal information
- Listed height: 6 ft 3 in (1.91 m)
- Listed weight: 300 lb (136 kg)

Career information
- High school: Canisius (Buffalo, New York)
- College: Penn State (2009–2013)
- NFL draft: 2014: 5th round, 175th overall pick

Career history
- Baltimore Ravens (2014–2016)

Awards and highlights
- James E. Sullivan Award (2013); William V. Campbell Trophy (2013); 2× First-team All-Big Ten (2012, 2013)

Career NFL statistics
- Games played: 40
- Games started: 13
- Stats at Pro Football Reference

John Cameron Urschel Jr. (born June 24, 1991) is a Canadian-born American mathematician and former professional football guard. He played college football at Penn State and was drafted by the Baltimore Ravens in the fifth round of the 2014 NFL draft. Urschel played his entire NFL career with Baltimore before announcing his retirement on July 27, 2017, at 26 years old.

Urschel has a PhD from the Massachusetts Institute of Technology in mathematics. He is an advanced statistics columnist for The Players' Tribune. He served a three-year term on the College Football Playoff selection committee which began in the spring of 2020, and is an assistant professor at the Department of Mathematics of the Massachusetts Institute of Technology.

== Early life and education ==
Urschel was born in Winnipeg, Manitoba, Canada. His parents, John Urschel Senior and Venita Parker, were a surgeon and attorney, respectively. He grew up in Buffalo, New York where he graduated from Canisius High School in 2009.

At Pennsylvania State University, Urschel earned a bachelor's degree in 2012 and a master's degree in 2013, both in mathematics, before earning his PhD in mathematics from the Massachusetts Institute of Technology in 2021. While at Penn State, he was awarded the William V. Campbell Trophy, known as the "academic Heisman".

== Professional football career ==
Pre-draft measurables
Height	Weight	Arm length	Hand span	40-yard dash	10-yard split	20-yard split	20-yard shuttle	Three-cone drill	Vertical jump	Broad jump	Bench press	Wonderlic
6 ft 3 in (1.91 m)	313 lb (142 kg)	33 in (0.84 m)	10 3/8 in (0.26 m)	5.31 s	1.84 s	3.08 s	4.47 s	7.55 s	29.0 in (0.74 m)	8 ft 6 in (2.59 m)	30 reps	43
All values from NFL Combine

Urschel was selected by the Baltimore Ravens in the fifth round of the 2014 NFL draft. He played in 11 games, starting three, for the Ravens in 2014. He appeared in 16 games, starting seven, for the team in 2015. He played in 13 games, starting three, his final season in 2016.

On July 27, 2017, Urschel announced his retirement from the NFL after three seasons. The Baltimore Sun reported that the JAMA study on the prevalence of chronic traumatic encephalopathy (CTE) in deceased players was a factor in Urschel's decision. Officially he stated, "This [CTE] was actually a serious, serious concern of mine. Yes, I am retiring; I did retire. But at the same time, I love the NFL. I love football. I wouldn't trade my experiences for the world. I do believe that football is a great game. I didn't want to be fodder for anti-football establishments."

His retirement as an active player was not the end of his participation in the sport. He was appointed to the College Football Playoff selection committee on January 22, 2020, serving a three-year term which began in the spring of that year.

== Mathematics career ==
While doing his master's at Penn State, Urschel was involved in teaching vector calculus, trigonometry and analytic geometry, and introduction to econometrics. In 2014, Urschel was named Arthur Ashe, Jr. Sports Scholar by Diverse: Issues In Higher Education. In 2015, Urschel co-authored a paper in the Journal of Computational Mathematics titled "A Cascadic Multigrid Algorithm for Computing the Fiedler Vector of Graph Laplacians". It includes "a cascadic multigrid algorithm for fast computation of the Fiedler vector of a graph Laplacian, namely, the eigenvector corresponding to the second smallest eigenvalue."

Urschel began a Ph.D. in mathematics at Massachusetts Institute of Technology in 2016, focusing on spectral graph theory, numerical linear algebra, and machine learning. MIT does not allow Ph.D. students to study part-time; while the Ravens knew that he was taking classes, Urschel admitted after retiring from the team that he did not disclose that he was a full-time graduate student, having taken correspondence classes in between games and practices. On January 4, 2017, Urschel was named to Forbes' "30 Under 30" list of outstanding young scientists and owns the following blurb: "Urschel has published six peer-reviewed mathematics papers to date and has three more ready for review. He's won academic awards for his math prowess. All this while playing guard for the Baltimore Ravens." Since 2017, Urschel has had an Erdős number of 4.

His PhD thesis on Graphs, Principal Minors, and Eigenvalue Problems was completed in 2021 under Michel Goemans at MIT.

He was a member of the Institute for Advanced Study in Princeton, New Jersey. He was also a Junior Fellow at the Harvard Society of Fellows from 2022 to 2023 and again from 2024 to 2025.

In the fall of 2023, Urschel joined the faculty of MIT as an assistant professor in the math department.

On October 2026, Urschel published "On the Growth Factor of Random Matrices" which solved a long standing problem in Gaussian elimination. Urschel acknowledged using OpenAI models to assist his research.

=== Awards and honors ===
- 2009: Mr. Canisius
- 2013: Senior CLASS Award
- 2016–2018: Dean of Science Fellowship
- 2017: Forbes's "30 Under 30" list in science
- 2024: Doctor of Letters, honoris causa, Dartmouth College

=== Papers ===
- Dhruv Rohatgi, John C. Urschel, Jake Wellens. "Regarding Two Conjectures on Clique and Biclique Partitions", Preprint, arXiv:2005.02529.
- John C. Urschel, "Uniform Error Estimates for the Lanczos Method", Preprint, arXiv:2003.09362.
- John C. Urschel, Jake Wellens. "Testing k-Planarity Is NP-Complete", Information Processing Letters.
- Victor-Emmanuel Brunel, Ankur Moitra, Philippe Rigollet, John C. Urschel. "Maximum Likelihood Estimation of Determinantal Point Processes", Preprint, arXiv:1701.06501.
- John C. Urschel, Ludmil T. Zikatanov. "Discrete Trace Theorems and Energy Minimizing Spring Embeddings of Planar Graphs", Linear Algebra and Its Applications, 2021.
- John C. Urschel. "Nodal Decompositions of Graphs", Linear Algebra and Its Applications, Volume 539, 60-71, 2018.
- John C. Urschel. "On the Characterization and Uniqueness of Centroidal Voronoi Tessellations", SIAM Journal on Numerical Analysis, 55(3), 1525-1547, 2017.
- John C. Urschel, Victor-Emmanuel Brunel, Ankur Moitra, Phillipe Rigollet. "Learning Determinantal Point Processes with Moments and Cycles", International Conference on Machine Learning (ICML), 2017.
- Victor-Emmanuel Brunel, Ankur Moitra, Philippe Rigollet, John Urschel. "Rates of Estimation for Determinantal Point Processes", Conference on Learning Theory (COLT), 2017.
- Xiaozhe Hu, John C. Urschel, Ludmil T. Zikatanov. "On the Approximation of Laplacian Eigenvalues in Graph Disaggregation", Linear and Multilinear Algebra, 65(9): 1805-1822, 2017.
- John C. Urschel, Ludmil T. Zikatanov. "On the Maximal Error of Spectral Approximation of Graph Bisection", Linear and Multilinear Algebra, 64(10): 1972-1979, 2016.
- John C. Urschel, Xiaozhe Hu, Jinchao Xu, Ludmil Zikatanov. "A Cascadic Multigrid Algorithm for Computing the Fiedler Vector of Graph Laplacians", Journal of Computational Mathematics, Volume 33 No. 2, 2015, 209-226.
- John C. Urschel, Ludmil T. Zikatanov. "Spectral Bisection of Graphs and Connectedness", Linear Algebra and Its Applications, Volume 449, 1-16, 2014.
- John C. Urschel. "A Space-Time Multigrid Method for the Numerical Valuation of Barrier Options", Communications in Mathematical Finance, Volume 2, no. 3, 1-20, 2013.
- John C. Urschel, Joseph R. Galante. "Instabilities in the Sun-Jupiter-Asteroid Three Body Problem", Celestial Mechanics and Dynamical Astronomy, Volume 115, Issue 3, 233–259, 2013

== Chess ==
Urschel competed in the 2015 Pittsburgh Open, finishing in 12th place (tied for 9th) with 3.0 points (+2-1=2) in the Under 1700 rating section. Urschel competes in competitive online chess on Chess.com, and he has commentated for Chess.com's BlitzChamps event, a rapid tournament for NFL players.

== Personal life ==
Urschel is married to writer Louisa Thomas, whom he met when she was profiling him for Grantland. They have two children. Urschel's autobiography, Mind and Matter: A Life in Math and Football, was co-written by Thomas and published in 2019.

== See also ==
- Frank Ryan – former NFL player and mathematician, who maintained an academic career while playing in the league
- Laurent Duvernay-Tardif - Former NFL player and doctor, who earned a medical degree while playing in the league
