= The War Lovers =

2010 book by Evan Thomas

The War Lovers: Roosevelt, Lodge, Hearst, and the Rush to Empire, 1898
- Author: Evan Thomas
- Language: English
- Genre: Non-fiction
- Publication date: 2010

The War Lovers: Roosevelt, Lodge, Hearst, and the Rush to Empire, 1898 is a 2010 nonfiction book by Evan Thomas that follows five prominent Americans in the lead-up to and during the Spanish–American War of 1898. It centers around Theodore Roosevelt, Thomas Brackett Reed, Henry Cabot Lodge, William James, and William Randolph Hearst.

== Critical reception ==
Ronald Steel, writing in The New York Times, concluded that "Thomas has illuminated, in a compulsively readable style, a critical moment in American history. This is a book that, with its style and panache, is hard to forget and hard to put down." Kirkus Reviews called it "A lively, well rounded look at politics and personalities in late 19th century America." The Christian Science Monitor determined: "Altogether readable, The War Lovers engagingly conveys what happened in this consequential period." In the Naval War College Review, the book was called a "captivating chronicle".
