= Einstein: His Life and Universe =

Book by Walter Isaacson

- First edition hardcover image
- Author: Walter Isaacson
- Language: English
- Subject: Albert Einstein
- Published: 2007
- Publisher: Simon & Schuster
- Publication place: United States
- Pages: 675
- ISBN: 9780743264730

Einstein: His Life and Universe is a non-fiction book authored by American historian and journalist Walter Isaacson. The biographical analysis of Albert Einstein's life and legacy was published by Simon & Schuster in 2007, and it has received a generally positive critical reception from multiple fronts, praise appearing from an official Amazon.com review as well as in publications such as The Guardian and Physics Today.

In broad terms, the book portrays Einstein as an insolent figure who possessed a strong sense of creativity and independence that, had the physicist succeeded in achieving academic employment as a young man, could have gotten quashed due to the atmosphere of the times.

== Background and contents ==
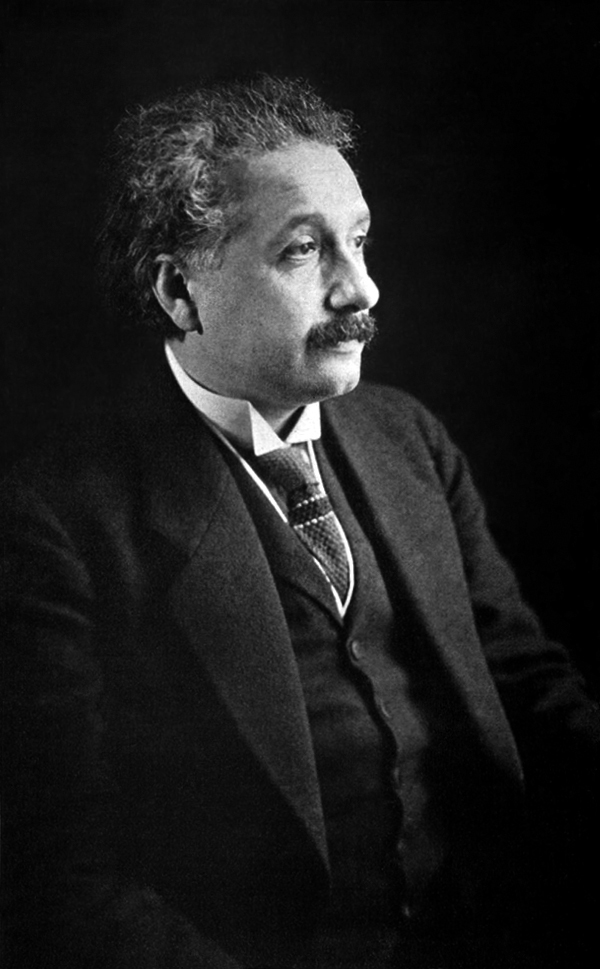
Einstein is photographed while taking a trip to the United States in 1921, the picture appearing in the publication The Scientific Monthly.

Isaacson had previously written books on the life stories of statesmen Benjamin Franklin and Henry Kissinger. In preparation for the work on Einstein, the author delved into volumes of previously examined writings to and from the physicist. Isaacson additionally collaborated with scientists Murray Gell-Mann, Brian Greene, and Lawrence Krauss to gain knowledge about the underlying background.

Isaacson's biographical analysis of Einstein's life reflects the nature of personal achievement in terms of the importance of inquisitiveness and the willingness to experiment. The physicist's theory of general relativity receives particular emphasis. Broadly speaking, Einstein is viewed as a kind of inherent rebel.

The author describes Einstein's insolent streak and how the sometimes abrasive nature around it cost Einstein much in the short term, though larger society benefited dramatically in the long run. After going through his studies in physics with "a sassy attitude" at the Zurich Polytechnic, Einstein wound up being the only graduate of his year's class not to be offered a job. The author notes Einstein's subsequent trek throughout Europe in search of work and its failure. "I will soon have graced every physicist from the North Sea to the southern tip of Italy with my offer," Einstein is quoted as writing. Rejected by the Swiss army for his misshapen feet and varicose veins, Isaacson details, Einstein finally managed to start a career at the Swiss patent office. Despite the mediocre posting, his independent research into his intellectual passions proved highly influential as Isaacson describes.

== Reception ==
The Observer published a supportive review by journalist Robin McKie. He remarked that Isaacson "triumphed over expectation[s]" as well as wrote that the "thorough exploration of" Einstein's life constituted both "a skilful piece of scientific literature and a thumping good read." MicKie labelled Einstein's life story as one of the most interesting tales "in modern science" and lauded Isaacson's "first-rate job in telling it."

The official Amazon.com review of the book, written by Anne Bartholomew, praised the author's approach and details, Bartholomew commenting,

"Isaacson... brings Einstein's experience of life, love, and intellectual discovery into brilliant focus. The book is the first biography to tackle Einstein's enormous volume of personal correspondence that heretofore had been sealed from the public, and it's hard to imagine another book that could do such a richly textured and complicated life as Einstein's same thoughtful justice. Isaacson is a master of the form and this latest opus is at once arresting and wonderfully revelatory."

In his review for Physics Today, writer and professor of physics E. L. Schucking broadly praised Isaacson's coverage of Einstein's life story while criticizing a vagueness and flippancy in the portrayal of Einstein's actual scientific ideas. In particular, Shucking criticized the author's "shunning of mathematical formulas" as failing to properly give readers the right context. However, viewing Isaacson's general approach as "thoughtful", Schucking lauded the "sympathetic biography of Einstein" as being well-written "and carefully researched with extensive notes."

Professor Matthew Stanley's review for Historical Studies in the Natural Sciences expressed a mixed response to the book, Stanley contending,

"Despite Isaacson's generally good appropriation of the historical literature, his major explanation for Einstein’s work is this: he was a rebel. And this is not just a descriptive term, this is an explanatory category. Einstein’s rebelliousness is painted as irreducible and innate: it is "ingrained" (133–4) and "deeply bred into his Swabian soul" (34). Einstein-as-rebel is the explanatory framework used throughout the book, for everything from relativity to quanta to world peace. Isaacson's insistence that every event be interpreted through this framework quickly becomes strained, showing the limits of such essentialist reasoning. The rebel genius is supposed to be distinguished by his tenacity in the face of contradiction—but when H. A. Lorentz did that he is labelled dogmatic. When Einstein did modify his ideas (such as his cosmological equations or his views on militant pacifism), he was praised as being a good scientist. Where did the rebel go?"

== See also ==
- 2007 in literature
