= Benjamin Franklin: An American Life =

2003 biography of Benjamin Franklin by Walter Isaacson

- First edition hardcover image
- Author: Walter Isaacson
- Language: English
- Subject: Benjamin Franklin
- Published: July 4, 2003
- Publisher: Simon & Schuster
- Publication place: United States
- Pages: 603
- ISBN: 9780684807614

Benjamin Franklin: An American Life is a non-fiction book authored by American historian and journalist Walter Isaacson. Published in 2003 by Simon & Schuster, the biographical work details the life and times of prominent U.S. statesman and Founding Father Benjamin Franklin. The book has received praise from multiple publications including Foreign Affairs and The Guardian.

== Background and contents ==
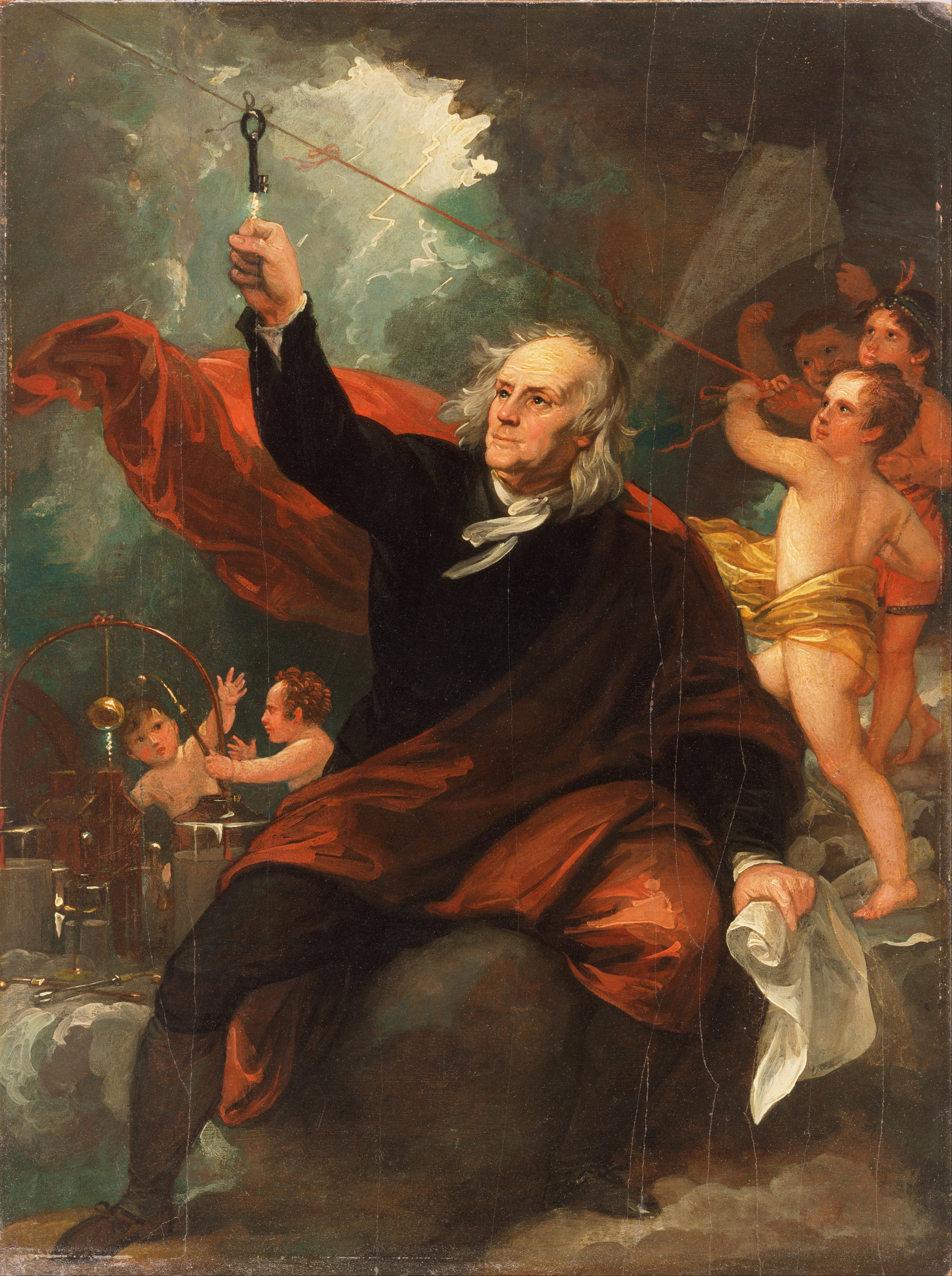
The famous artwork Benjamin Franklin Drawing Electricity from the Sky, painted by Benjamin West (c. 1816), refers to the statesman's dogged pursuit of scientific understanding.

Isaacson notes that Franklin's reputation has shifted based on time and place given the statesman's achievements and personality. Franklin, the author states, "has been vilified in romantic periods and lionised in entrepreneurial ones" since "each era appraises him anew" and thus "in doing so reveals some assessments of itself." In broad terms, Isaacson describes Franklin as a quintessential figure of the Age of Enlightenment as well as one seen as a prototypical American by those to which the very concept was new. The author particularly argues that Franklin should get thought of as an important figure in the history of science.

In terms of Franklin's personal character, the author writes that the statesman possessed a sense of sociability in contrast to struggling somewhat with close intimacy. Franklin missed the wedding of his daughter as well as the death of his wife. As a father, he projected a certain coldness. However, Isaacson details that Franklin's inherently jovial nature came out in multiple meaningful friendships, particularly in terms of young women that the statesman genuinely engaged with intellectually.

The author states that Franklin's ambition and natural talent as a printer eventually earned the statesman a publishing empire. Isaacson describes the business achievements in depth and goes on to note the complexities of Franklin's political viewpoints. A major figure in the American Revolution, Franklin devoted his considerable abilities in support of the new nation.

In terms of Franklin's influence on American life, the author states that the statesman established a philosophical undercurrent of "practical benevolence" that has since endured in U.S. society. This pragmatic approach to existence stands in contrast to another influence, in Isaacson's opinion, that comes from the American Puritans and emphasizes a kind of idealistic vision and near-mysticism.

== Reception ==
Jay Parini wrote a supportive review for The Guardian, lauding the work as "a lively, readable[,] and affecting book." Parini concluded, "Isaacson admires his subject deeply, and makes us admire... [Franklin] too." Foreign Affairs published a praising commentary by historian Walter Russell Mead as well. Labeling Franklin "the most genial and engaging" of the Founding Fathers, Mead remarked that Isaacson "produced a biography to match". Mead particularly stated that the author handled "the twists and turns of Franklin's political views with sensitivity and understanding" while additionally presenting "an eloquent case for considering Franklin a major figure in the history of science."

== See also ==
- 2003 in literature
