= The Nichols-Chancellor's Medal =

The Nichols-Chancellor's Medal is an annual medal that is awarded by Vanderbilt University. The Nichols-Chancellor's Medal is awarded to those persons who define the 21st century and exemplify the best qualities of the human spirit. The Medal is awarded on each Senior Class Day to persons chosen by Vanderbilt's Chancellor with the advice of the faculty and students. Senior Class Day is the day before Vanderbilt's spring undergraduate commencement. In 2020, Senior Class Day was renamed Graduates Day to be more inclusive to all Vanderbilt students, including graduate, professional and undergraduate students, who will earn a degree the following day. The Medal includes a cash award and is one of the university's highest honors.

== History ==
The tradition of Senior Class Day was started by Chancellor Gordon Gee, and the first Senior Class Day was in 2004. Vanderbilt awarded The Chancellor's Medal to Condoleezza Rice and Shirin Ebadi on Senior Class Day in 2004 and 2005 respectively. The Nichols-Chancellor's Medal replaced The Chancellor's Medal in 2006. The first Nichols-Chancellor's Medal was awarded that year to disaster relief workers around the world and was accepted on their behalf by the first lady of the United States, Laura Bush. The Nichols-Chancellor's Medal was created and endowed by Edward and Janice Nichols in memory of Ed's parents, Edward Carmack Nichols and Lucile Hamby Nichols. In 2009, a permanent endowment fund known as The Edward and Janice Nichols Endowment Fund was established at Vanderbilt to fund The Nichols-Chancellor's Medal and The Nichols Humanitarian Fund in perpetuity.

== Nichols Humanitarian Fund ==
The Nichols Humanitarian Fund is a companion scholarship fund to The Nichols-Chancellor's Medal. The purpose of fund is to enable Vanderbilt students to volunteer for humanitarian causes. The fund awards scholarships based on merit and need to Vanderbilt students to pay the expenses of their humanitarian activities. It was established by Edward and Janice Nichols in 2006 in honor of Laura Bush's speech on Senior Class Day. The $100,000 cash prize that accompanied The Nichols-Chancellor's Medal that Mrs. Bush accepted was given to Vanderbilt to start the fund. The fund also receives substantial contributions each year from The Edward and Janice Nichols Endowment Fund. The first scholarships were awarded in 2007.

== Mission ==
The Nichols-Chancellor's Medal and Nichols Humanitarian Fund seek to make Vanderbilt students better members of their communities and society in general by supporting their humanitarian activities and bringing speakers to Vanderbilt who embody the best of humanity.

== Medalists ==
- 2006 – Awarded to disaster relief workers around the world and accepted on their behalf by Laura Bush
- 2007 – Muhammad Yunus
- 2008 – Bob Geldof
- 2009 – Doris Kearns Goodwin
- 2010 – Khaled Hosseini
- 2011 – Wangari Maathai
- 2012 – Tom Brokaw
- 2013 – Toni Morrison
- 2014 – Regina Benjamin
- 2015 – Walter Isaacson
- 2016 – Soledad O'Brien
- 2017 – Ken Burns
- 2018 – Amal Clooney
- 2019 – Venus Williams
- 2020 – Caroline Kennedy
- 2021 – Dr. Anthony Fauci
- 2022 – Reid Hoffman
- 2023 – Maria Ressa
- 2024 – David Brooks
- 2025 – Gary Sinise
- 2026 – Arthur C. Brooks
