= Louisa Thomas =

American journalist and author

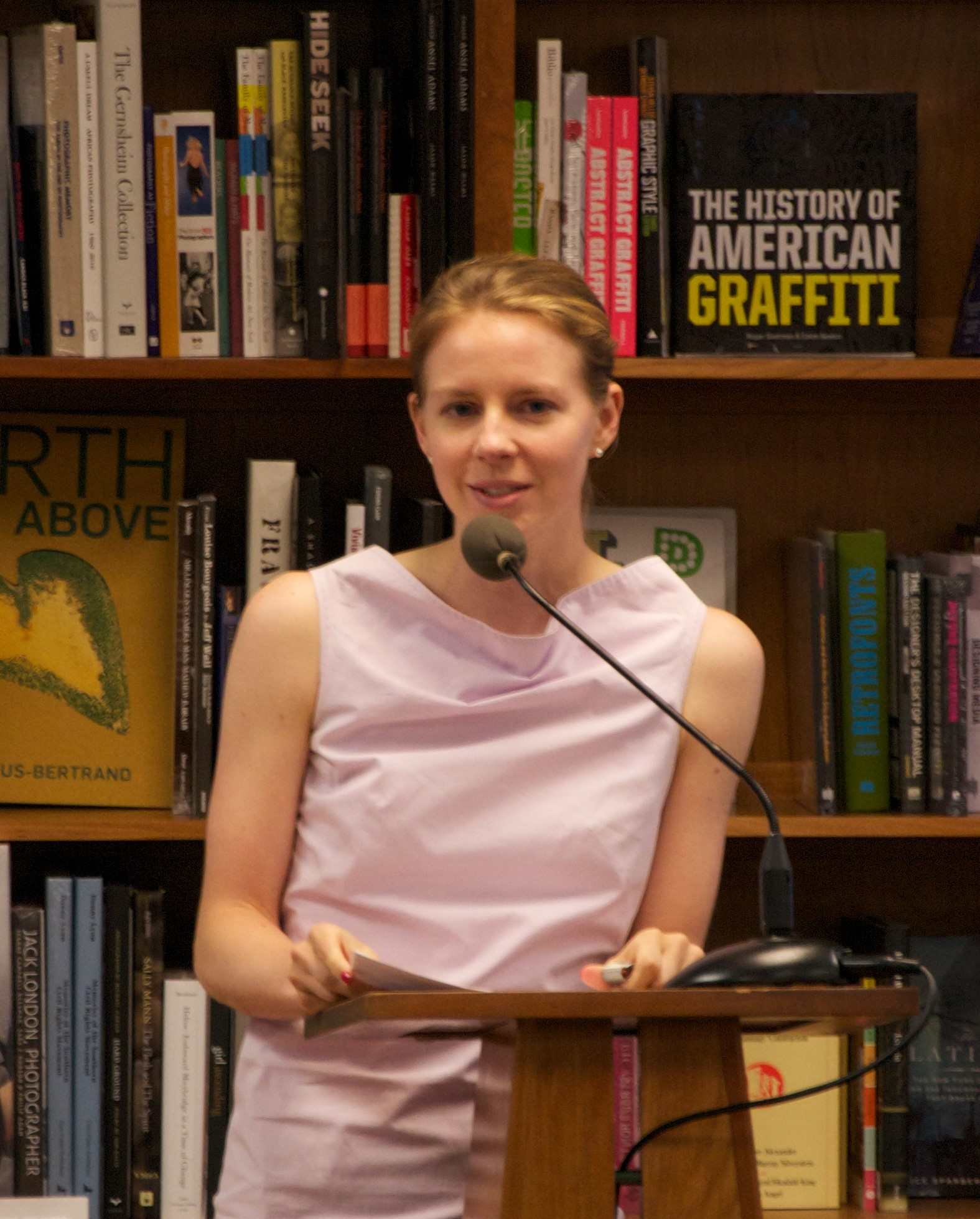
- Born: 1981 (age 44–45)
- Education: Harvard University
- Occupation: Journalist • author
- Spouse: John Urschel
- Parent: Evan Thomas (father)
- Relatives: Norman Thomas (great-grandfather)
- Writing career
- Genre: non-fiction

Louisa Thomas (born 1981) is an American writer and sports journalist.

== Early life and education ==
Thomas is the daughter of journalist and Newsweek editor Evan Thomas and Washington, D.C. attorney Oscie Thomas. She graduated from Harvard University summa cum laude with a degree in English in 2004.

== Career ==
Thomas is a contributor to The New Yorker and a former editor and writer at Grantland. Her work has appeared in The New York Times, The Wall Street Journal, Vogue, and The Paris Review. Thomas has published two books: 2017's Louisa: The Extraordinary Life of Mrs. Adams, a biography of First Lady Louisa Adams, and 2011's Conscience: Two Soldiers, Two Pacifists, One Family—a Test of Will and Faith in World War I, about the moral conflicts her family endured during World War I and focusing on her pacifist great-grandfather, Norman Thomas. She is a former fellow at New America.

Though much of Thomas's writing is about sports, it is influenced by her studies of poetry; she cites Wallace Stevens as a major influence.

== Personal life ==
Thomas's first marriage ended in divorce. Her second is to mathematician and former NFL player John Urschel. They have one daughter. Urschel's autobiography, Mind and Matter: A Life in Math and Football, was co-written by Thomas and published in 2019.

== Bibliography ==
=== Books ===
- Thomas, Louisa (June 2, 2011). Conscience: Two Soldiers, Two Pacifists, One Family—a Test of Will and Faith in World War I. Penguin Publishing Group. ISBN 978-1-101-51530-3.
- — (April 5, 2016). Louisa: The Extraordinary Life of Mrs. Adams. Penguin Publishing Group. ISBN 978-1-101-98082-8.
- Urschel, John & Louisa Thomas, Louisa (May 14, 2019). Mind and Matter: A Life in Math and Football. Penguin Random House. ISBN 9780735224889.

=== Essays and reporting ===
- Thomas, Louisa (July 23, 2023). "The World Cup and the frustrating, inspiring state of women's soccer". The Sporting Scene. The New Yorker. (Note: Available on website only.)

———————

Bibliography notes
