= U.S.-Vietnam Dialogue Group on Agent Orange/Dioxin =

Agent Orange dialogue group

The U.S.-Vietnam Dialogue Group on Agent Orange/Dioxin was formally established in February 2007 as an initiative of prominent private citizens, scientists and policy-makers on both the Vietnamese and US sides, working on issues that the two countries’ governments have found difficult to address. It is not an implementing agency nor a fundraising organization. Its role has been to call attention to the need for five key actions to be undertaken in a humanitarian spirit: to establish treatment and education centers for Vietnamese with disabilities; cooperate with the U.S. and Vietnamese governments to contain and clean up dioxin, beginning at three priority airport "hot spots"; set up a modern dioxin testing laboratory in Vietnam; foster programs for training of trainers in restoration and management of damaged landscapes; and educate the U.S. public on the issues. Leading the Vietnamese side is Ambassador Ngo Quang Xuan, vice chair of the Vietnamese National Assembly's Foreign Affairs Committee, and leading the U.S. side is Walter Isaacson, president and CEO of the Aspen Institute. The convener of the group is Susan Berresford, former President of the Ford Foundation.

Additional members include: Christine Todd Whitman, President, Whitman Strategy Group; William Mayer, President & CEO, Park Avenue Equity Partners; Mary Dolan-Hogrefe, Vice President and Senior Advisor, National Organization on Disability; Dr. Vaughan Turekian, Chief International Officer, American Association for the Advancement of Science; Professor Vo Quy, Center for Natural Resources & Environmental Studies, Vietnam National University, Ho Chi Minh City; Dr. Nguyen Thi Ngoc Phuong, Chief, Obstetrics & Gynecology, Medical University of Ho Chi Minh City; Do Hoang Long, Director, People to People Relations Department, Party External Relations Committee; and Lt. General Phung Khac Dang, Vice President, Vietnam Veterans Association.

On June 16, 2010, members of the U.S.-Vietnam Dialogue Group on Agent Orange/Dioxin unveiled a comprehensive 10-year Declaration and Plan of Action to address the toxic legacy of Agent Orange and other herbicides in Vietnam. The Plan of Action was released as an Aspen Institute publication and calls upon the U.S. and Vietnamese governments to join with other governments, foundations, businesses, and nonprofits in a partnership to clean up dioxin "hot spots" in Vietnam, and to expand humanitarian services for people with disabilities in that country. On September 16, 2010, Senator Patrick Leahy (D- VT) acknowledged the work of the Dialogue Group by releasing a statement on the floor of the United States Senate. The statement urges the U.S. government to take the Plan of Action's recommendations into account in developing a multi-year plan of activities to address the Agent Orange/dioxin legacy.
