= The Code Breaker =

2021 book by Walter Isaacson

The Code Breaker: Jennifer Doudna, Gene Editing, and the Future of the Human Race
- First edition cover
- Author: Walter Isaacson
- Language: English
- Subject: Jennifer Doudna; CRISPR gene editing
- Genre: Biography; science
- Publisher: Simon & Schuster
- Publication date: March 9, 2021
- Publication place: United States
- Media type: Print (hardcover), e-book, audiobook
- Pages: 560
- ISBN: 978-1-9821-1585-2 (hardcover)
- OCLC: 1187220557
- Dewey Decimal: 576.5
- LC Class: QH440 .I83 2021
- Preceded by: Leonardo da Vinci

The Code Breaker: Jennifer Doudna, Gene Editing, and the Future of the Human Race is a non-fiction book authored by American journalist Walter Isaacson. Published in March 2021 by Simon & Schuster, it is a biography of Jennifer Doudna, the winner of the 2020 Nobel Prize in Chemistry for her work on the CRISPR system of gene editing.

== Promotion ==
On March 22, 2021, Isaacson appeared on The Late Show with Stephen Colbert to discuss the book.

== Reception ==
The book debuted at number one on The New York Times nonfiction best-seller list for the week ending March 13, 2021.

In its starred review, Kirkus Reviews called it a "vital book about the next big thing in science—and yet another top-notch biography from Isaacson."

Publishers Weekly called it a "gripping account of a great scientific advancement and of the dedicated scientists who realized it."
