= Global Health Corps =

U.S. non-profit organization

- Founded: 2009 (17 years ago)
- Founder: Barbara Pierce Bush; Jenna Bush Hager; Charlie Hale; Andrew Bentley; Dave Ryan; Jonny Dorsey; Katie Bollbach
- Type: 501(c) organization
- Purpose: HIV/AIDS; Maternal & child health; Malaria; Nutrition & food security; Sexual & reproductive health; Health education; Non-communicable diseases; Community health
- Location: New York City, New York, United States
- Region served: Burundi; Malawi; Rwanda; Uganda; United States; Zambia
- Method: Supporting existing organizations by building communities of passionate healthcare professionals
- CEO: Heather Anderson
- Slogan: To mobilize a global community of emerging leaders to build the movement for health equity
- Key people: Dr. Michele Barry; Dr. Susan Blumenthal; John Bridgeland; Mark Dybul; Dr. Paul Farmer; Jessica Jackley; Geeta Rao Gupta; Dr. Raj Gupta; Dr. Peter Piot; Jonathan Hughes
- Website: ghcorps.org

Global Health Corps is a U.S. non-profit organization that offers a competitive fellowship to support emerging global health leaders.

Global Health Corps selects young professionals for paid, 13 month fellowships with organizations promoting health equity in East Africa, Southern Africa, and the United States. For each Global Health Corps site, one national fellow and one international fellow are paired to promote cross-cultural awareness and understanding. Global Health Corps provides financial support, professional development, and mentorship to hundreds of fellows each year.

== History ==
Established in 2009, in that year Global Health Corps sent its first class of fellows to year-long assignments in Rwanda, Malawi, Tanzania, Newark, and Boston. The 22 fellows were selected from 1,300 applicants. After a two-week Training Institute at Stanford University, the fellows began assignments with one of five partner nonprofits: the Clinton HIV/AIDS Initiative, Partners In Health, the Southern African Center for Infectious Disease Surveillance, Covenant House in Newark, New Jersey, and the University of Medicine and Dentistry of New Jersey. The Training Institute has been held at Yale University in New Haven, CT since July 2010.

The Global Health Corps concept arose from brainstorming at the aids2031 conference hosted by Google.org in March 2008. Global Health Corps was founded in 2009 and has received support from Google.org and a number of other private organizations. The CEO and Co-Founder of Global Health Corps, Barbara Pierce Bush was awarded an Echoing Green Fellowship and a Draper Richards Fellowship in 2009 to support the development of the Global Health Corps.

== Global Health Corps Fellows ==
Global Health Corps fellows come from diverse backgrounds, and vary in educational experience, professional expertise, and personal background. Mainly aimed to young people, the average age of the 2014-2015 fellow class was 25.7. The fellows were recruited from:

- Nonprofit sector (29%)
- Directly from graduate programs (21%)
- Directly from undergraduate programs (11%)
- Private sector (19%)
- Government/public sector (10%)

Global Health Corps fellows work in diverse professional areas including:

- Advocacy
- Case management
- Communications
- Corporate social responsibility
- Database management / data analysis / statistics
- Design / architecture
- Development / fundraising / grant-writing
- Direct service
- eHealth / eLearning / mHealth
- Finance / budgeting
- Health promotion / education
- Information technology / ICT / informatics
- Knowledge management
- Logistics / supply chain management / procurement
- Monitoring and evaluation / quality improvement
- Operations
- Partnership development
- Policy
- Program / project management
- Research
- Strategic planning / consulting
- Teaching / curriculum development
- Volunteer management

== Placement organizations ==
Global Health Corps recruits, selects and places emerging young leaders with non-profit organizations and government agencies in Burundi, Malawi, Rwanda, Uganda, the United States, and Zambia.
