= The Black Book (Patterson novel) =

2017 novel by James Patterson and David Ellis

- First edition
- Author: James Patterson and David Ellis
- Language: English
- Genre: Thriller
- Publisher: Little, Brown and Company
- Publication date: March 27, 2017
- Publication place: United States
- Media type: Print (hardcover)
- Pages: 448 pp (first edition, hardcover)
- ISBN: 978-0316273886

The Black Book is a novel by James Patterson and David Ellis, book 1 in the Black Book Thriller series.

== Plot ==
This novel goes back and forth between present events involving Chicago detective Billy Harney and past events involving him. The novel starts with three people being found dead in an apartment (Billy, Billy's partner Detective Kate Fenton and Assistant District Attorney Amy Lentini). Billy's father, the chief of detectives, and his sister, Patty (also a detective), are ushered into this horrific crime scene. As they are leaving it is discovered Billy is barely hanging onto life.

It appears that Billy killed Amy and Kate burst into the apartment and Billy and Kate simultaneously shot each other. When Billy recovers enough to become conscious and coherent, he cannot remember this or the time leading up to this event at all. Prior to the time leading up to Billy's memory loss he and a team of officers waited outside a brownstone where prostitution was taking place. Billy hoped to find a suspected murderer inside. While the team waited, the mayor and other elite in the city entered. Billy pondered what to do and decided to go forward with the raid, knowing his career could be on the line. Once inside and everyone inside was arrested, Kate was with the group that searched for the black book of addresses of clients.

The rest of the novel deals with the intrigue concerning the black book. Various persons suspect each other of taking it and some suspect Billy of having it. Once Billy recovers from his wounds enough to leave the hospital, another two murders take place and Billy is suspected of these. The book is a thriller novel where various persons accuse each other of the theft of the black book and of the murders.

== Reviews ==
Kirkus Reviews gave a positive review of this novel and it gave a positive review of coauthor David Ellis, "Most readers will be ahead of the twin investigators in identifying the guilty party. But the mystery is authentic, the lead-up genuinely suspenseful, and the leading characters and situations more memorable than Patterson’s managed in quite a while. Co-author Ellis is definitely a keeper." Reviewers from Publishers Weekly wrote, "Many readers will agree with Patterson that this is the 'best book [he’s] written in 25 years.'” Joe Hartlaub of bookreporter said this, "While it ends on an upbeat yet bittersweet note, the characters — those who make it through to its conclusion, anyway — seem too good to be consigned to a stand-alone work."

Vox Magazine, with some criticisms, liked this novel, saying, "So while The Black Book might not be what one considers emotionally stimulating, and the character development is of a caliber decidedly lower than that of a Jane Austen novel, don’t be surprised if you find yourself flipping through the pages with the same vigor you had binge-watching that first season of How to Get Away With Murder."

The Black Book was first on the New York Times "Combined Print & E-Book Fiction" list for the weeks of April 16, 2017, and April 30, 2017.
