= Evan Thomas =

American journalist, historian, author, and lawyer

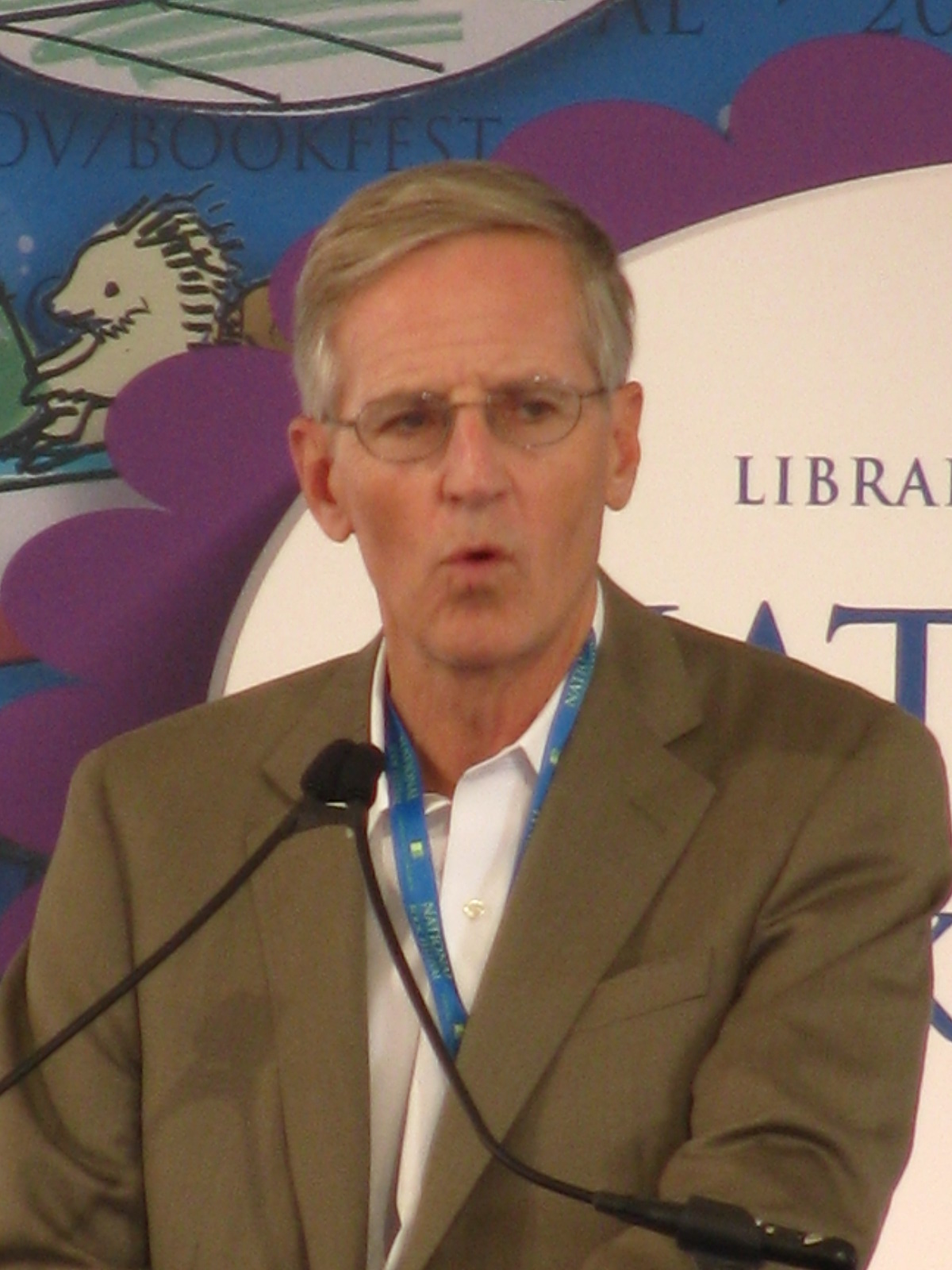
- At the 2013 National Bookfest
- Born: Evan Welling Thomas III; April 25, 1951 (age 75); Huntington, New York, U.S.
- Education: Harvard University (BA); University of Virginia (JD)
- Spouse: Osceola Freear Thomas
- Children: 2, including Louisa
- Relatives: Norman Thomas (grandfather)
- Writing career
- Genres: Non-fiction; history

Evan Welling Thomas III (born April 25, 1951) is an American journalist, historian, lawyer, and author. He is the author of 11 books, including two New York Times bestsellers.

== Early life and career ==
Thomas was born in Huntington, New York, and raised in nearby Cold Spring Harbor. He graduated from Phillips Academy and received his Bachelor of Arts from Harvard University and his Juris Doctor from the University of Virginia School of Law. After 1991, he was a reporter, writer, and editor at Newsweek for 24 years. Prior to that, he was at Time. Thomas began his reporting career at The Bergen Record in northeastern New Jersey.

In 1992, Director of Central Intelligence Robert Gates granted Thomas access to view classified Central Intelligence Agency files. The fundamental authority for this policy is Executive Order 12356 (April 1982), as implemented in HR 10–24(c)4. Under these provisions, the CIA may grant individual researchers and former presidential appointees access to classified files, once the recipient of this access signs a secrecy agreement and agrees to allow the agency to review his manuscript to ensure that it contains no classified information. Gates directed that the CIA history staff locate and provide records that would satisfy Thomas's research request. Thomas's manuscript was subsequently reviewed in accordance with his secrecy agreement and approved in March 1995. In 1996, Thomas penned an article for the Central Intelligence Agency's journal, Studies in Intelligence, describing his experience having been granted the rare privilege of historical access to CIA's classified files.

He was for 20 years a regular panelist on the weekly public affairs TV show Inside Washington until the show ceased production in December 2013.

He taught writing and journalism at Harvard and Princeton between 2003 and 2014. For seven years, from 2007 to 2014, he was the Ferris Professor of Journalism in residence at Princeton.

== Family ==
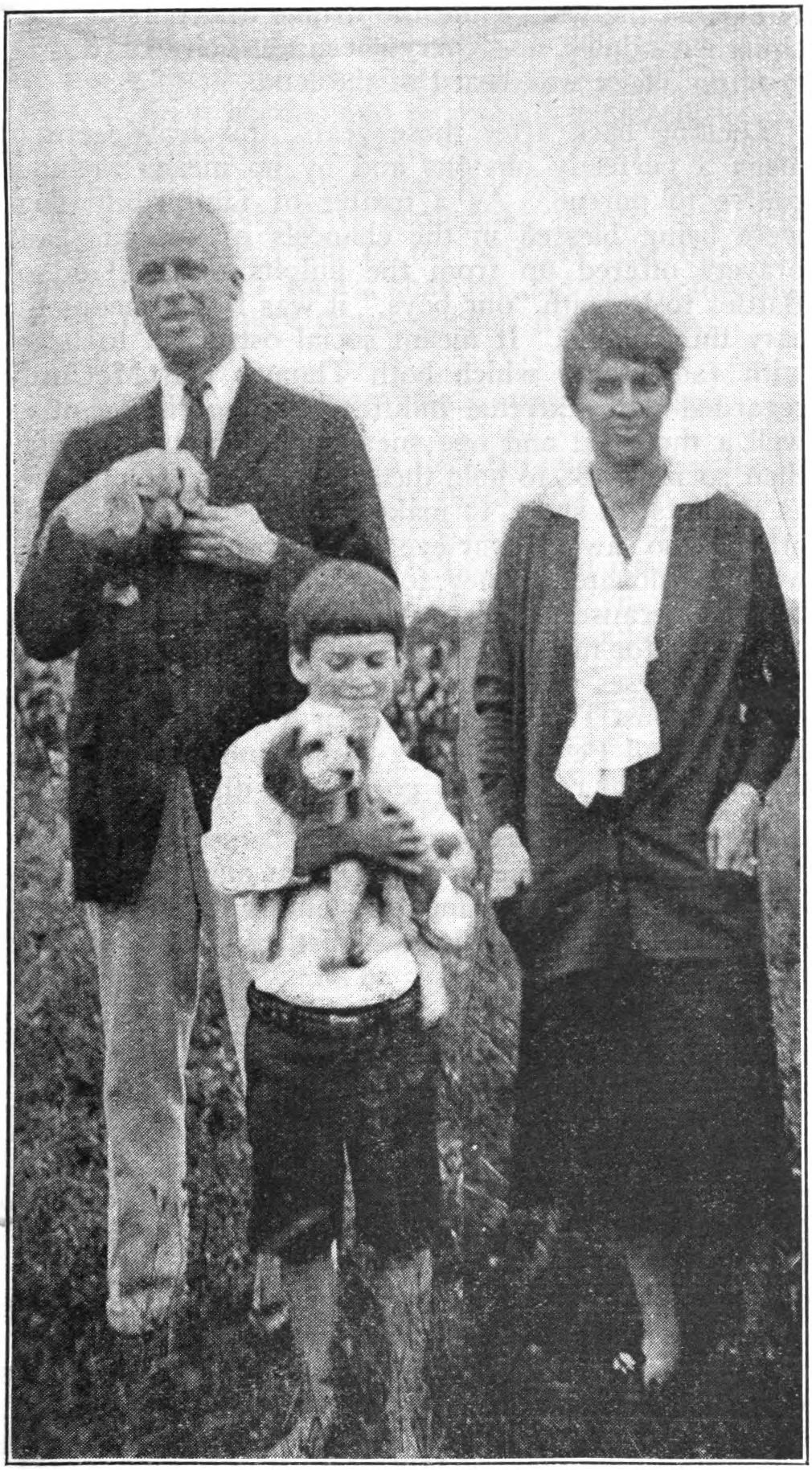
Thomas's father Evan Sr. (center), grandfather Norman (left) and grandmother Violet (right) in a 1928 Socialist Party publication

He is the son of Anna Davis (née Robins) and Evan Welling Thomas II, an editor who worked for HarperCollins and W. W. Norton & Company. His grandfather, Norman Thomas, was a six-time presidential candidate for the Socialist Party of America.

He is married, and he and his wife, an attorney, are the parents of two daughters, including writer Louisa Thomas. They live in Washington, D.C.

== Works ==
Books

- The Wise Men: Six Friends and the World They Made. Walter Isaacson, Evan Thomas, Simon & Schuster, 1986; Simon & Schuster, 1997. ISBN 978-0-684-83771-0
- The Man to See: The Life of Edward Bennett Williams. Simon & Schuster, 1992. ISBN 978-0-671-79211-4
- The Very Best Men: The Early Years of the CIA. Simon & Schuster, 1996. ISBN 978-0-684-82538-0
- Back from the Dead: How Clinton Survived the Republican Revolution. Atlantic Monthly Press, 1997. ISBN 978-0-87113-689-3
- Robert Kennedy: His Life. Simon & Schuster, 2000. ISBN 978-0-684-83480-1
- John Paul Jones: Sailor, Hero, Father of the American Navy. Simon & Schuster, 2004. ISBN 978-0-7432-5804-3
- Sea of Thunder: Four Naval Commanders and the Last Sea War. Simon & Schuster, 2007. ISBN 9780743252225
- A Long Time Coming: The Inspiring, Combative 2008 Campaign and the Historic Election of Barack Obama. PublicAffairs, 2009. ISBN 9781586486075
- The War Lovers: Roosevelt, Lodge, Hearst, and the Rush to Empire, 1898, Little, Brown and Company, 2010. ISBN 978-0-316-00409-1
- Ike's Bluff: President Eisenhower's Secret Battle to Save the World. Little, Brown and Company. ISBN 978-0316091046
- Being Nixon: A Man Divided. Random House, 2015. ISBN 978-0-8129-9536-7
- First: Sandra Day O'Connor. Random House, 2019. ISBN 978-0399589287
- Road to Surrender: Three Men and the Countdown to the End of World War II. Random House, 2023. ISBN 978-0399589256

Articles

- Thomas, Evan (1996). "A Singular Opportunity – Gaining Access to CIA's Records". Studies in Intelligence. 39 (5): 19–23.
