= The Wise Men (book) =

Book by Walter Isaacson

- Author: Walter Isaacson; Evan Thomas
- Genre: Non-fiction
- Publisher: Simon & Schuster
- Publication date: 1986
- Pages: 853 pp.
- ISBN: 0-671-50465-7
- Dewey Decimal: 327.2/092/2
- LC Class: E747.I77 1986

The Wise Men: Six Friends and the World They Made is a non-fiction book authored by Walter Isaacson and Evan Thomas. Published by Simon & Schuster in 1986, it describes the actions of a group of U.S. federal government officials and members of the East Coast foreign policy establishment. Starting in the immediate post-World War II period, the group developed the containment policy of dealing with the Communist bloc during the Cold War. They also helped to craft institutions and initiatives such as NATO, the World Bank, and the Marshall Plan. An updated edition of the book was released in 2012. Supportive reviews appeared in publications such as Foreign Affairs and the Los Angeles Times.

== Members of the group ==
The book identifies six people who were important foreign policy advisors to U.S. presidents from Franklin D. Roosevelt to Lyndon Johnson and influential in the development of Cold War era foreign policy for the U.S. The six are:

- Dean Acheson, Secretary of State under President Harry S Truman
- Charles E. Bohlen, U.S. ambassador to the Soviet Union, the Philippines, and France
- W. Averell Harriman, Special Envoy for President Franklin Roosevelt
- George F. Kennan, ambassador to the Soviet Union and Yugoslavia, State Dept. Director of Policy Planning
- Robert A. Lovett, Truman's Secretary of Defense
- John J. McCloy, a War Department official and later U.S. High Commissioner for Germany.

The group comprised two lawyers, two bankers, and two diplomats. Five of the six were from the Georgetown Set. Acheson, Harriman, and Lovett had known each other since their days at prep school or college and on Wall Street. Bohlen, Kennan and McCloy were younger and did not know the others well until their public lives brought them into close contact. Most of these men, Lovett and McCloy in particular, were strongly influenced by Secretary of War Henry Stimson. Elihu Root, Stimson's mentor, is often regarded as the prototypical "wise man."

== Influence ==
They coalesced as a group when Harry S. Truman became president in 1945 and greatly needed advice on foreign policy, as he knew very little in that area. The group helped to create a bipartisan foreign policy based on resistance to the expansion of Soviet power. The authors describe them as the hidden architects behind the Truman Doctrine, the Marshall Plan, and Cold War containment. Kennan, in particular, is regarded as "the father of containment".

The book portrays them as personifying an ideal of statesmanship marked by nonpartisanship, pragmatic internationalism, and aversion to ideological fervor. They tended to be practical, pro-business, and anti-Communist. After the six had retired from public life, they and other like-minded establishment elders were dubbed The Wise Men. In 1967 and 1968, Johnson summoned them and a few others (including General Omar Bradley) to advise him on foreign policy, particularly the Vietnam War. In November 1967, they unanimously recommended staying in Vietnam, but in a pivotal second meeting in March 1968, most said the war could not be won and American troops should be withdrawn.

== Legacy ==
Later public figures, such as Clark Clifford, James A. Baker III, and Robert S. Strauss are sometimes evaluated by comparing them to these "wise men".

== Reviews ==
Excerpts

- "A sober and straightforward account of what actually happened and why... In this context the book does a great service. It restores balance to our recent history, and some sheen to its heroes. It may generate a much-needed movement to correct revisionist history. It should be read." —Foreign Affairs
- "In their first major book, Isaacson and Thomas have written an engrossing work of popular history that will live well beyond the 1980s." —Los Angeles Times

Citations

- Chace, James. "Books of the Times". The New York Times (October 2, 1986) p. 21
- Forrestal, Michael V. "Capsule Review". Foreign Affairs, Vol. 65, No. 2 (Winter 1986/87)
- Steel, Ronald. "Cohort of the American Century". The New York Times (November 2, 1986) p. 007003

== See also ==
- 1986 in literature
