= Sisters First =

2017 non-fiction book

Sisters First: Stories from Our Wild and Wonderful Life
- Authors: Jenna Bush Hager; Barbara Pierce Bush
- Language: English
- Genre: Non-fiction
- Publisher: Grand Central Publishing
- Publication date: 2017
- Pages: 238
- ISBN: 978-1-5387-1141-5
- OCLC: 972386724

Sisters First: Stories from Our Wild and Wonderful Life is a 2017 non-fiction book co-authored by Jenna Bush Hager and Barbara Pierce Bush, the fraternal twin daughters of former U.S. President George W. Bush.

This book features alternating narratives from twins born into the Bush family.
