= Barbara Bush (born 1981) =

American activist

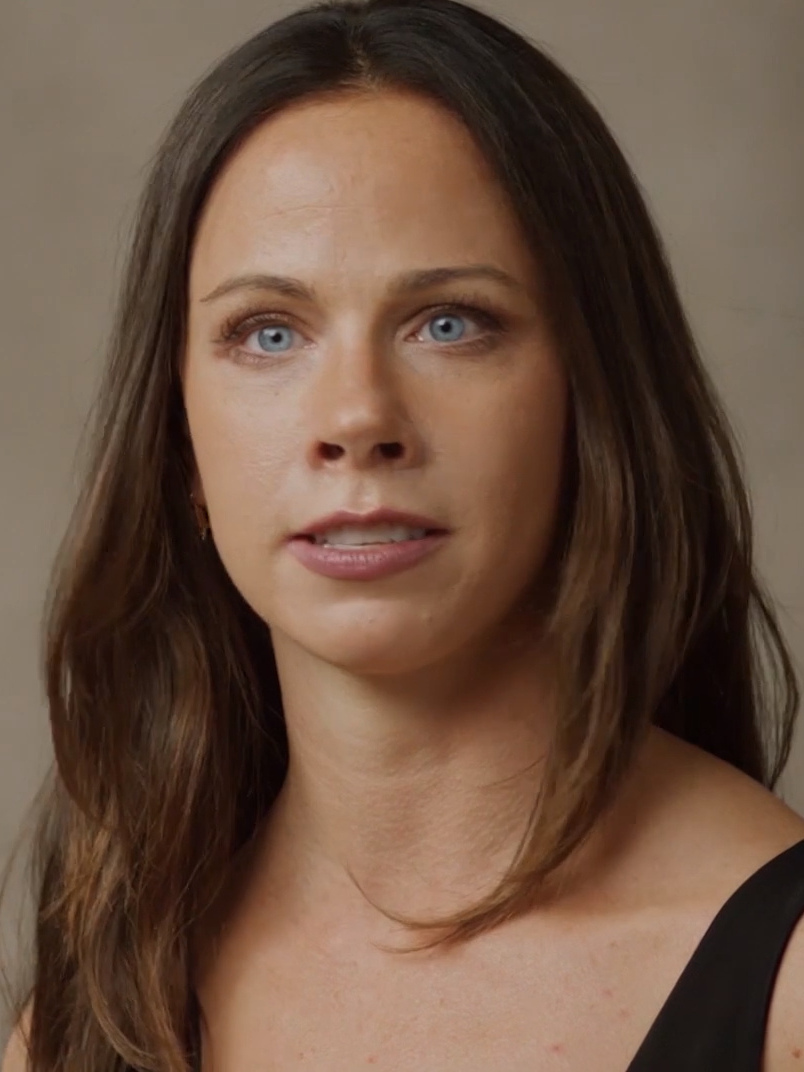
- Bush in 2016
- Born: Barbara Pierce Bush; November 25, 1981 (age 44); Dallas, Texas, U.S.
- Education: Yale University (BA); Harvard University (MPA)
- Occupation: Health care activist
- Years active: 2000–present
- Political party: Independent
- Board member of: Global Health Corps
- Spouse: Craig Coyne (m. 2018)
- Children: 2
- Parents: George W. Bush; Laura Bush
- Family: Bush family

Barbara Pierce Bush (born November 25, 1981) is an American activist and author. She co-founded and is the chair of the board of the nonprofit organization Global Health Corps. She and her fraternal twin sister, Jenna, are the daughters of the 43rd U.S. president George W. Bush and former first lady Laura Bush. She is also a granddaughter of the 41st U.S. president, George H. W. Bush, and former first lady Barbara Bush, after whom she is named.

== Early life and education ==
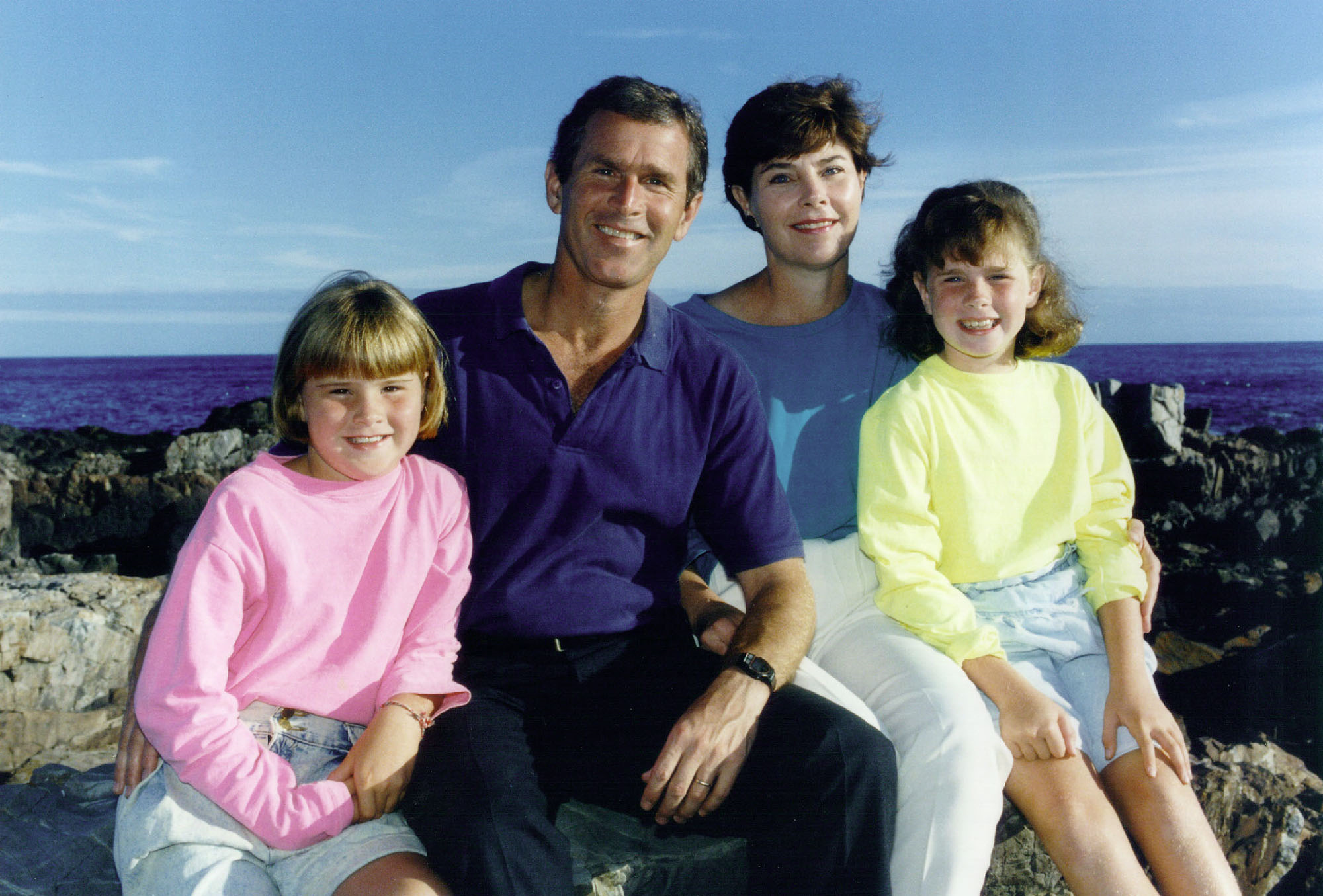
Barbara (rightmost) with her parents, George W. Bush and Laura Bush and her sister, Jenna, in 1990

Barbara Pierce Bush was born on November 25, 1981, at Baylor University Medical Center in Dallas, Texas, before her twin sister Jenna. When the family lived in the Preston Hollow section of Dallas, she and Jenna attended Preston Hollow Elementary School; Laura Bush served on Preston Hollow's Parent-Teacher Association at that time. Later, Barbara and Jenna attended The Hockaday School in Dallas. When her father became Governor of Texas in 1994, Barbara attended St. Andrew's Episcopal School in Austin, Texas. She began Austin High School in 1996, graduating with the class of 2000. Barbara then graduated from Yale University, where she was a member of Kappa Alpha Theta, with a Bachelor of Arts in humanities and earned a Master in Public Administration from Harvard Kennedy School as a fellow with the Center for Public Leadership.

== Smithsonian and activism in Africa ==
She worked for the Cooper Hewitt, Smithsonian Design Museum, a subsidiary of the Smithsonian Institution. Previously, she had been working with AIDS patients in Africa: Tanzania, South Africa, and Botswana, among other places, through a program sponsored by the Houston-based Baylor College of Medicine's International Pediatrics AIDS Initiative. Her interest in the issue began when she went to Africa with her parents to launch President Bush's Emergency Plan For AIDS Relief (PEPFAR).

== Global Health Corps ==
Barbara is the co-founder and president of a public health-focused nonprofit, Global Health Corps. Global Health Corps provides opportunities for young professionals from diverse backgrounds to work on the front lines of the fight for global health equity. In 2009, Global Health Corps won a Draper Richards Foundation Fellowship, and Bush was made a 2009 Echoing Green fellow for her work with Global Health Corps. Bush was also chosen as one of the 14 speakers selected from an applicant pool of 1,500 to speak at the TEDx Brooklyn event in December 2010, where she spoke about Global Health Corps. She delivered the commencement address at the University of Maryland's graduation ceremony in May 2019.

== Political activity ==
Bush's graduation from Yale in May 2004 was given heavy media coverage. She and Jenna made several media appearances that summer prior to the 2004 U.S. presidential election, including giving a speech to the Republican Convention on August 31. She and Jenna took turns traveling to swing states with their father and also gave a seven-page interview and photo shoot in Vogue. Jenna later confirmed that she and Barbara both had developed a friendship with John Kerry's daughters, Alexandra and Vanessa, who had similarly campaigned on behalf of their own father (who was the Democratic nominee for president). Bush joined her mother on diplomatic trips to Liberia in January 2006 to attend the inauguration of President Ellen Johnson Sirleaf and to Vatican City to meet with Pope Benedict XVI in February 2006.

Unlike most of her relatives except her twin sister Jenna, Bush is not a member of the Republican Party. In 2010, Bush and her sister told People that they preferred not to identify with any political party, stating, "We're both very independent thinkers."

In 2011, Bush released a video with the Human Rights Campaign, the nation's largest lesbian, gay, bisexual, and transgender (LGBT) civil rights organization, calling on New York State to legalize same-sex marriage. "I am Barbara Bush, and I am a New Yorker for marriage equality," she said in the brief message, sponsored by an advocacy group. "New York is about fairness and equality. And everyone should have the right to marry the person that they love.'" Bush joined other children of prominent Republican politicians—including Meghan McCain and Mary Cheney—in endorsing gay marriage.

In October 2024, Bush endorsed and campaigned for Democratic presidential nominee Kamala Harris in the 2024 U.S. presidential election.

In October 2026, Bush was reported to have donated $2,500 to a super PAC supporting James Talarico in the 2026 United States Senate election in Texas. Political attorney and campaign finance expert Andrew Cates noted that, although the amount was not significant, that "She [Bush] didn’t give it to a [501] (c)(4), in which her contribution would have been completely anonymous. She gave it to a PAC that reports all the money in and out."

== Personal life ==
Bush and her sister authored the memoir Sisters First: Stories from Our Wild and Wonderful Life, published in 2017.

On October 7, 2018, Bush married screenwriter Craig Louis Coyne in a private ceremony at the Bush family compound in Kennebunkport, Maine, with only 20 people attending. It was held then in part so that Bush's grandfather, George H. W. Bush, whose health was on the decline at the time (and would die a month later), could attend. They held an additional wedding reception six months later in April 2019 with 100 guests. Their daughter was born on September 27, 2021. Their son was born on August 4, 2024.

== Works ==
- Bush, Barbara Pierce; Bush Hager, Jenna (2017). Sisters First: Stories from Our Wild and Wonderful Life. New York: Grand Central Publishing. ISBN 9781538711415. OCLC 972386724.
