= Walter Isaacson =

American author and journalist (born 1952)

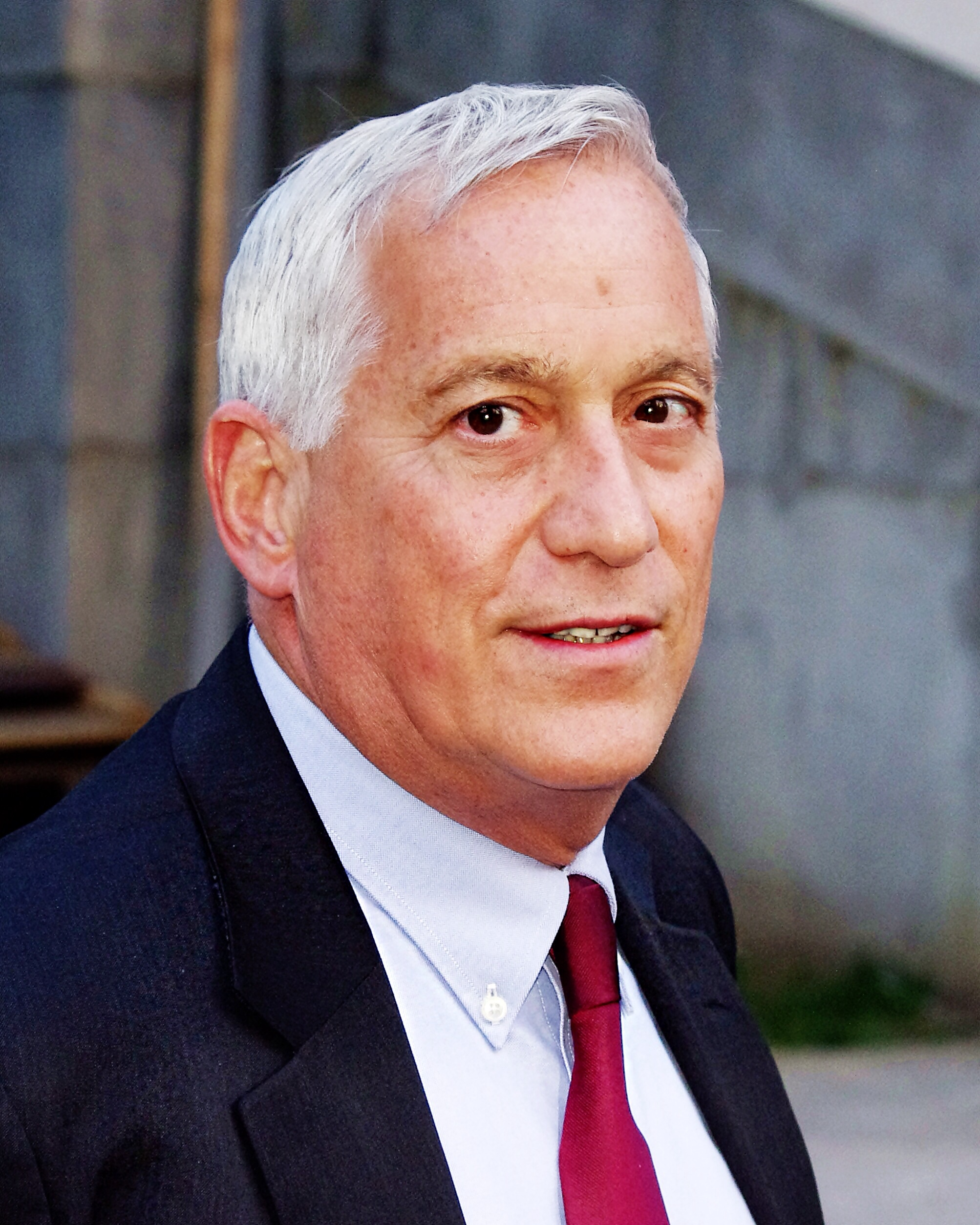
- Isaacson in 2012

Chair of the Broadcasting Board of Governors
- In office July 2, 2010 – January 27, 2012
- President: Barack Obama
- Preceded by: James K. Glassman
- Succeeded by: Jeff Shell

Personal details
- Born: Walter Seff Isaacson; May 20, 1952 (age 74) New Orleans, Louisiana, U.S.
- Spouse: Cathy Wright (m. 1984)
- Children: 1
- Education: Harvard University (BA); Pembroke College, Oxford (BA)
- Awards: Benjamin Franklin Medal (2013); Nichols-Chancellor's Medal (2015); National Humanities Medal (2023)

Walter Seff Isaacson (born May 20, 1952) is an American journalist who has written biographies of Henry Kissinger, Benjamin Franklin, Leonardo da Vinci, Albert Einstein, Steve Jobs, Jennifer Doudna, and Elon Musk. As of 2024, Isaacson is a professor at Tulane University and, since 2018, an interviewer for the PBS and CNN news show Amanpour & Company.

He has been the president and CEO of the Aspen Institute, a nonpartisan policy studies organization based in Washington, D.C., the chair and CEO of CNN, and the editor of Time.

Isaacson attended Harvard University and Pembroke College, Oxford as a Rhodes scholar. He is the co-author with Evan Thomas of The Wise Men: Six Friends and the World They Made (1986) and the author of Pro and Con (1983), Kissinger: A Biography (1992), Benjamin Franklin: An American Life (2003), Einstein: His Life and Universe (2007), American Sketches (2009), Steve Jobs (2011), The Innovators: How a Group of Hackers, Geniuses, and Geeks Created the Digital Revolution (2014), Leonardo da Vinci (2017), The Code Breaker: Jennifer Doudna, Gene Editing, and the Future of the Human Race (2021), Elon Musk (2023), and The Greatest Sentence Ever Written (2025).

Isaacson is an advisory partner at Perella Weinberg Partners, a New York City–based financial services firm. He was vice chair of the Louisiana Recovery Authority, which oversaw the rebuilding after Hurricane Katrina, chaired the government board that runs Voice of America, and was a member of the Defense Innovation Board.

== Early life and education ==
Walter Seff Isaacson was born on May 20, 1952, in New Orleans, Louisiana, the son of Betty "Betsy" Lee (née Seff) and Irwin Isaacson. His father was an electrical and mechanical engineer, and his mother was a real estate broker. He attended New Orleans' Isidore Newman School, where he was student body president. He also attended the Telluride Association Summer Program (TASP) at Deep Springs College.

Isaacson studied at Harvard University, where he majored in history and literature and graduated in 1974. At Harvard, Isaacson was the president of the Signet Society, a member of the Harvard Lampoon, and a resident of Lowell House. He later attended Pembroke College, Oxford, as a Rhodes scholar, where he studied philosophy, politics, and economics (PPE) and graduated with first-class honours.

== Career ==
=== Media ===
Isaacson began his career in journalism at The Sunday Times in London, followed by a position with the New Orleans Times-Picayune. He joined Time magazine in 1978, serving as the magazine's political correspondent, national editor, and editor of new media before becoming the magazine's 14th editor in 1996.

Isaacson became chairman and CEO of CNN in July 2001, replacing Tom Johnson, and only two months later, guided CNN through the events of 9/11. Shortly after his appointment at CNN, Isaacson sought the views of Republican Party leaders on Capitol Hill regarding criticisms that CNN broadcast content that was unfair to Republicans or conservatives. He was quoted in Roll Call magazine as saying: "I was trying to reach out to a lot of Republicans who feel that CNN has not been as open to covering Republicans, and I wanted to hear their concerns." The CEO's conduct was criticized by the Fairness & Accuracy In Reporting (FAIR) organization, which said that Isaacson's "pandering" behavior was endowing conservative politicians with power over CNN.

In January 2003, he announced that he would step down as president of CNN to become president of the Aspen Institute. Jim Walton replaced Isaacson as president of CNN.

Isaacson served as the president and CEO of the Aspen Institute from 2003 until 2018, when he stepped down to become a professor of history at Tulane University and an advisory partner at the New York City financial services firm Perella Weinberg Partners. In November 2017, the Aspen Institute named Dan Porterfield, the president of Franklin & Marshall College, as Isaacson's successor.

In March 2017, Isaacson launched a podcast with Dell Technologies called Trailblazers, which focuses on technology's effects on business. In 2018, Isaacson was named as a contributor for the Amanpour & Company airing on PBS and CNN that replaced The Charlie Rose Show.

Beginning in 2023, Isaacson hosts a podcast series produced by Kaleidoscope Content and iHeartMedia. Its three seasons include ON Musk, On CRISPR, and ON Benjamin Franklin.

=== Writing ===
Isaacson is the author of multiple published books, including Kissinger: A Biography (1992), Benjamin Franklin: An American Life (2003), Einstein: His Life and Universe (2007) and American Sketches (2009). He additionally co-authored with Evan Thomas the work The Wise Men: Six Friends and the World They Made (1986).

On October 24, 2011, Steve Jobs, Isaacson's authorized biography of Apple Inc.'s Jobs, was published by Simon & Schuster, only a few weeks after Jobs's death. It became an international best-seller, breaking all records for sales of a biography. The book was based on over forty interviews with Jobs over a two-year period up until shortly before his death, and on conversations with friends, family members, and business rivals of the entrepreneur.

In October 2014, Isaacson published The Innovators: How a Group of Inventors, Hackers, Geniuses, and Geeks Created the Digital Revolution, which explores the history of the key technological innovations that were prominent in the digital revolution, most notably the parallel developments of the computer and the Internet. It became a New York Times bestseller. Writing for the New York Times, Janet Maslin described the author as "a kindred spirit to the visionaries and enthusiasts" whom Isaacson wrote about.

He is the editor of Profiles in Leadership: Historians on the Elusive Quality of Greatness (2010, W. W. Norton).

His eponymous biography of Leonardo da Vinci was published on October 17, 2017, to positive reviews from critics. In August 2017, Paramount Pictures won a bidding war against Universal Pictures for the rights to adapt Isaacson's biography of da Vinci. The studio bought the rights under its deal with Leonardo DiCaprio's Appian Way Productions, which said that it planned to produce the film with DiCaprio as the star. Screenwriter John Logan (The Aviator, Gladiator) has been tapped to pen the script.

His book The Code Breaker: Jennifer Doudna, Gene Editing, and the Future of the Human Race was published in March 2021 by Simon & Schuster. It is a biography of Jennifer Doudna, the winner of the 2020 Nobel Prize in Chemistry for her work on the CRISPR system of gene editing. The book debuted at number one on The New York Times nonfiction best-seller list for the week ending March 13, 2021. Publishers Weekly called it a "gripping account of a great scientific advancement and of the dedicated scientists who realized it."

Isaacson's biography of Elon Musk was published by Simon & Schuster on September 12, 2023. It was shortlisted for the 2023 Financial Times Business Book of the Year Award, though its accuracy as a biography has been disputed.

In November 2025, Isaacson's book The Greatest Sentence Ever Written will be released. It is about the "We hold these truths" sentence in the United States Declaration of Independence, to celebrate the United States Semiquincentennial. Even though the signers lived in a reality of deep contradiction—41 of the 56 signers, including Thomas Jefferson, enslaved people—Isaacson notes that they understood the words would outlast their lifetimes.

=== Government ===
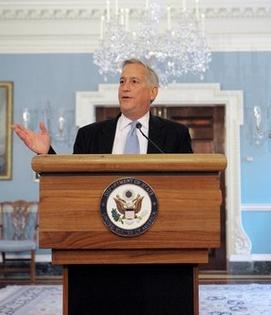
Isaacson at a State Department briefing in 2008

In October 2005, the Governor of Louisiana, Kathleen Blanco, appointed Isaacson vice chairman of the Louisiana Recovery Authority, a board that oversaw spending on the recovery from Hurricane Katrina. In December 2007, he was appointed by President George W. Bush to the chairman of the U.S.-Palestinian Partnership, which seeks to create economic and educational opportunities in the Palestinian territories. Secretary of State Hillary Clinton appointed him vice-chair of the Partners for a New Beginning, which encourages private-sector investments and partnerships in the Muslim world.

He also served as the co-chair of the U.S.-Vietnamese Dialogue on Agent Orange, which in January 2008 announced completion of a project to contain the dioxin left behind by the U.S. at the Da Nang air base and plans to build health centers and a dioxin laboratory in the affected regions.

In 2008, he was appointed to be a member of the Advisory Committee of the National Institutes of Health. In 2009, he was appointed by President Obama to be chairman of the Broadcasting Board of Governors, which runs Voice of America, Radio Free Europe, and the other international broadcasts of the U.S. government; he served until January 2012.

In 2014, he was appointed by New Orleans Mayor Mitch Landrieu to be the co-chair of the New Orleans Tricentennial Commission, which planned the city's 300th-anniversary commemoration in 2018. In 2015, he was appointed to the board of My Brother's Keeper Alliance, which seeks to carry out President Obama's anti-poverty and youth opportunity initiatives. In 2016, he was appointed by Landrieu and confirmed by the City Council to be a member of the New Orleans City Planning Commission. He is a member of the U.S. Department of Defense Innovation Advisory Board. In 2018, he was appointed by New Orleans mayor-elect LaToya Cantrell to be co-chair of her transition team.

== Positions ==
Isaacson is an advisory partner at Perella Weinberg, a financial services firm. He is the chairman emeritus of the board of Teach for America and is on the boards of United Airlines Holdings, Inc., Halliburton Labs, The New Orleans Advocate/Times-Picayune, New Schools New Orleans, Bloomberg Philanthropies, the Rockefeller Foundation, the Carnegie Institution for Science and the Society of American Historians, of which he served as president in 2012.

In March 2019, Isaacson became the editor-at-large and senior adviser for Arcadia Publishing, where he was to promote books for the company as well as be involved in editing, new strategy development, and partnerships.

Isaacson is an Associate of the History of Science Department and a member of the Lowell House Senior Common Room at Harvard University. He is also an honorary fellow of Pembroke College, Oxford. Walter Isaacson is a special professor of history at Tulane University. He teaches the course "The Digital Revolution" every spring and the course "Law and U.S. History" every fall. His courses often feature prominent guest speakers such as author Michael Lewis, Kickstarter founder Perry Chen, and billionaire businessman James Coulter. At Tulane, Isaacson co-chairs the annual New Orleans Book Festival.

== Honors ==
In 2023, Isaacson received the National Humanities Medal from President Joe Biden. The White House citation of Isaacson's award emphasizes that his "work, words, and wisdom bridge divides between science and the humanities and between opposing philosophies, elevating discourse and our understanding of who we are as a Nation".

Isaacson's book Steve Jobs, about the life of the entrepreneur, earned Isaacson the 2012 Gerald Loeb Award.

In 2012, he was selected as one of the Time 100, the magazine's list of the most influential people in the world. Isaacson is a fellow of the Royal Society of Arts and was awarded its 2013 Benjamin Franklin Medal. He is also a member of the American Academy of Arts and Sciences, the American Philosophical Society and an Honorary Fellow of Pembroke College, Oxford.

In 2014, the National Endowment for the Humanities selected Isaacson for the Jefferson Lecture, the U.S. federal government's highest honor for achievement in the humanities. The title of Isaacson's lecture was "The Intersection of the Humanities and the Sciences".

He has honorary degrees from Tufts University, Cooper Union, American University, William & Mary, Franklin University Switzerland, University of New Orleans, University of South Carolina, City University of New York (Hunter College), Pomona College, Lehigh University, Duke University, and Colorado Mountain College, where the Isaacson School of Media and Communications is named after him. He was the 2015 recipient of The Nichols-Chancellor's Medal at Vanderbilt University.

In 2026, Isaacson received the Golden Plate Award of the American Academy of Achievement.

== Bibliography ==
- Pro and Con: Both Sides of Dozens of Unsettled and Unsettling Arguments. (Putnam, 1983). ISBN 0-399-12869-7.
- Isaacson W, Evan Thomas (1986). The Wise Men: Six Friends and the World They Made. New York: Simon and Schuster. ISBN 9780571146062.
- Kissinger: A Biography. (Simon & Schuster, 1992). ISBN 978-0-671-66323-0.
- Benjamin Franklin: An American Life. (Simon & Schuster, 2003). ISBN 978-0-684-80761-4.
- Einstein: His Life and Universe. (Simon & Schuster, 2007). ISBN 978-0-7432-6474-7.
- Isaacson, Walter (December 2009). "How Einstein divided America's Jews". The Atlantic. 304 (5): 70–74.
- American Sketches. (Simon & Schuster, 2009). ISBN 978-1-4391-8344-1.
- Steve Jobs. (Simon & Schuster, 2011). ISBN 978-1-4516-4853-9.
- The Innovators: How a Group of Inventors, Hackers, Geniuses, and Geeks Created the Digital Revolution. (Simon & Schuster, 2014). ISBN 978-1-4767-0869-0.
- Leonardo da Vinci. (Simon & Schuster, 2017). ISBN 978-1-5011-3915-4.
- The Code Breaker: Jennifer Doudna, Gene Editing, and the Future of the Human Race. (Simon & Schuster, 2021). ISBN 978-1-9821-1585-2.
- Elon Musk. (Simon & Schuster, 2023). ISBN 978-1982181284.
- The Greatest Sentence Ever Written. (Simon & Schuster, 2025). ISBN 978-1982181314.

== See also ==
- Great man theory of history
- New Yorkers in journalism
