= Steve Jobs (book) =

2011 authorized biography by Walter Isaacson

- Author: Walter Isaacson
- Cover artist: Albert Watson
- Language: English
- Genre: Biography
- Publisher: Simon & Schuster (U.S.)
- Publication date: October 24, 2011
- Publication place: United States
- Media type: E-book, Print (Hardback and Paperback), and Audiobook
- Pages: 656 pp.
- ISBN: 1-4516-4853-7
- OCLC: 713189055

Steve Jobs is the authorized self-titled biography of American business magnate and Apple co-founder Steve Jobs. The book was written at the request of Jobs by Walter Isaacson, a former executive at CNN and Time who had previously written best-selling biographies of Benjamin Franklin and Albert Einstein.

Based on more than 40 interviews with Jobs conducted over two years—in addition to interviews with more than 100 family members, friends, adversaries, competitors, and colleagues—Isaacson was given "unprecedented" access to Jobs's life. Jobs is said to have encouraged the people interviewed to speak honestly. Although Jobs cooperated with the book, he asked for no control over its content other than the book's cover, and waived the right to read it before it was published. Describing his writing, Isaacson commented that he had striven to take a balanced view of his subject that did not sugarcoat Jobs's flaws.

The book was released on October 24, 2011, by Simon & Schuster in the United States, 19 days after Jobs's death.

A film adaptation written by Aaron Sorkin and directed by Danny Boyle, with Michael Fassbender starring in the title role, was released on October 9, 2015.

== Appearance ==
The book's cover photograph is similar to one taken previously by Norman Seeff and featured on Rolling Stone.

=== Front cover ===
The front cover uses a photo of Steve Jobs commissioned by Fortune magazine in 2006 for a portfolio of powerful people. The photograph was taken by Albert Watson.

When the photograph was taken, he said he insisted on having a three-hour period to set up his equipment, adding that he wanted to make "[every shoot] as greased lightning fast as possible for the [subject]." When Jobs arrived he didn't immediately look at Watson, but instead at the equipment, focusing on Watson's 4×5 camera before saying, "wow, you're shooting film."

If you look at that shot, you can see the intensity. It was my intention that by looking at him, that you knew this guy was smart. I heard later that it was his favorite photograph of all time.

— Albert Watson

Jobs gave Watson an hour—longer than he had given most photographers for a portrait session. Watson reportedly instructed Jobs to make "95 percent, almost 100 percent of eye contact with the camera," and to "think about the next project you have on the table," in addition to thinking about instances when people have challenged him.

The title font is Helvetica.

=== Back cover ===
The back cover uses another photographic portrait of Jobs taken in his living room in Woodside, California, in February 1984 by Norman Seeff. In a Behind the Cover article published by Time magazine, Seeff recalls him and Jobs "just sitting" on his living room floor, talking about "creativity and everyday stuff," when Jobs left the room and returned with a Macintosh 128K (the original Macintosh computer). Jobs "[plopped] down" in the lotus position holding the computer in his lap when Seeff took the photograph.

We did do a few more shots later on, and he even did a few yoga poses—he lifted his leg and put it over his shoulder—and I just thought we were two guys hanging out, chatting away, and enjoying the relationship. It wasn't like there was a conceptualization here—this was completely off the cuff, spontaneity that we never thought would become an iconic image.

— Norman Seeff

The placeholder cover used for the book uses the working title, iSteve: The Book of Jobs.

=== Title ===
The book's working title, iSteve: The Book of Jobs, was chosen by publisher Simon & Schuster's publicity department. Although author Walter Isaacson was "never quite sure about it", his wife and daughter reportedly were. However, they thought it was "too cutesy" and as a result Isaacson persuaded the publisher to change the title to something "simpler and more elegant."

The title Steve Jobs was allegedly chosen to reflect Jobs's "minimalist" style and to emphasize the biography's authenticity, further differentiating it from unauthorized publications, such as iCon Steve Jobs: The Greatest Second Act in the History of Business by Jeffrey Young.

=== Chapters ===
Many of the chapters within the book have sub-headings, which are matched in various audiobook versions resulting in listings showing 150+ chapters when there are only 42 chapters. The audiobook contains a mistake on one chapter title, listing Chapter 41 as "Round Three, A Never-ending Struggle" instead of "Round Three, Twilight Struggle" as published.

Chapter number	Chapter title	Sub-heading number	Sub-heading title	Approx. audiobook mark
Introduction	How this book came to be			00:00:00
Chapter 1	Childhood, Abandoned and Chosen	1.1	The Adoption	00:13:02
		1.2	Silicon Valley	00:25:21
		1.3	School	00:42:39
Chapter 2	Odd Couple, The Two Steves	2.1	Woz	01:05:56
		2.2	The Blue Box	01:21:37
Chapter 3	The Dropout, Turn On, Tune in...	3.1	Chrisann Brennan	01:30:36
		3.2	Reed College	01:35:05
		3.3	Robert Friedland	01:46:22
		3.4	...Drop Out	01:54:33
Chapter 4	Atari and India, Zen and the Art of Game Design	4.1	Atari	01:59:40
		4.2	India	02:06:39
		4.3	The Search	02:15:38
		4.4	Breakout	02:26:07
Chapter 5	The Apple I, Turn On, Boot Up, Jack In...	5.1	Machines of Loving Grace	02:33:32
		5.2	The Homebrew Computer Club	02:42:29
		5.3	Apple is Born	02:51:56
		5.4	Garage Band	03:04:24
Chapter 6	The Apple II, Dawn of a New Age	6.1	An Integrated Package	03:13:27
		6.2	Mike Markkula	03:23:38
		6.3	Regis McKenna	03:34:26
		6.4	The First Launch Event	03:38:11
		6.5	Mike Scott	03:41:30
Chapter 7	Chrisann and Lisa, He Who Is Abandoned...			03:51:29
Chapter 8	Xerox and Lisa, Graphical User Interface	8.1	A New Baby	04:06:51
		8.2	Xerox PARC	04:13:56
		8.3	Great Artists Steal	04:22:35
Chapter 9	Going Public, A Man of Wealth and Fame	9.1	Options	04:32:45
		9.2	Baby You're a Rich Man	04:38:28
Chapter 10	The Mac is Born, You Say You Want a Revolution	10.1	Jef Raskin's Baby	04:46:11
		10.2	Texaco Towers	04:59:56
Chapter 11	The Reality Distortion Field, Playing by His Own Set of Rules			05:06:51
Chapter 12	The Design, Real Artists Simplify	12.1	A Bauhaus Aesthetic	05:26:42
		12.2	Like a Porsche	05:34:31
Chapter 13	Building The Mac, The Journey Is The Reward	13.1	Competition	05:52:12
		13.2	End-to-end Control	05:57:32
		13.3	Machines of the Year	06:03:10
		13.4	Let's Be Pirates!	06:09:32
Chapter 14	Enter Sculley, The Pepsi Challenge	14.1	The Courtship	06:26:07
		14.2	The Honeymoon	06:42:37
Chapter 15	The Launch, A Dent in the Universe	15.1	Real Artists Ship	06:52:32
		15.2	The "1984" Advert	06:59:25
		15.3	Publicity Blast	07:08:24
		15.4	January 24, 1984	07:12:51
Chapter 16	Gates And Jobs, When Orbits Intersect	16.1	The Macintosh Partnership	07:24:56
		16.2	The Battle of the GUI	07:39:51
Chapter 17	Icarus, What goes up...	17.1	Flying High	07:47:33
		17.2	Falling	08:03:16
		17.3	Thirty Years Old	08:10:45
		17.4	Exodus	08:15:37
		17.5	Showdown, Spring 1985	08:26:04
		17.6	Plotting a Coup	08:39:18
		17.7	Seven Days in May	08:43:15
		17.8	Like a Rolling Stone	08:59:15
Chapter 18	NeXT, Prometheus Unbound	18.1	The Pirates Abandon Ship	09:08:55
		18.2	To Be On your Own	09:27:34
		18.3	The Computer	09:42:44
		18.4	Perot to the Rescue	09:50:09
		18.5	Gates and NeXT	09:55:41
		18.6	IBM	10:00:51
		18.7	The Launch, October 1988	10:05:37
Chapter 19	Pixar, Technology Meets Art	19.1	Lucasfilm's Computer Division	10:18:42
		19.2	Animation	10:29:53
		19.3	Tin Toy	10:35:56
Chapter 20	A Regular Guy, Love Is Just a Four-Letter Word	20.1	Joan Baez	10:48:26
		20.2	Finding Joanne and Mona	10:55:08
		20.3	The Lost Father	11:03:58
		20.4	Lisa	11:10:59
		20.5	The Romantic	11:18:17
Chapter 21	Family Man, At Home with the Jobs Clan	21.1	Laurene Powell	11:31:43
		21.2	The Wedding, March 18, 1991	11:43:48
		21.3	A Family Home	11:51:16
		21.4	Lisa Moves In	12:02:15
		21.5	Children	12:13:07
Chapter 22	Toy Story, Buzz and Woody to the Rescue	22.1	Jeffrey Katzenberg	12:16:46
		22.2	Cut!	12:25:23
		22.3	To Infinity!	12:32:35
Chapter 23	The Second Coming, What Rough Beast, Its Hour Come Round at Last...	23.1	Things Fall Apart	12:42:10
		23.2	Apple Falling	12:47:19
		23.3	Slouching toward Cupertino	12:57:10
Chapter 24	The Restoration, The Loser Now Will Be Later to Win	24.1	Hovering Backstage	13:14:44
		24.2	Exit, Pursued by a Bear	13:37:57
		24.3	Macworld Boston, August 1997	14:01:30
		24.4	The Microsoft Pact	14:05:29
Chapter 25	Think Different, Jobs as iCEO	25.1	Here's to the Crazy Ones	14:16:28
		25.2	iCEO	14:30:23
		25.3	Killing the Clones	14:36:06
		25.4	Product Line Review	14:40:50
Chapter 26	Design Principles, The Studio of Jobs and Ive	26.1	Jony Ive	14:49:26
		26.2	Inside the Studio	15:01:45
Chapter 27	The iMac, Hello (Again)	27.1	Back to the Future	15:09:53
		27.2	The Launch, May 6, 1998	15:25:06
Chapter 28	CEO, Still Crazy after All These Years	28.1	Tim Cook	15:34:11
		28.2	Mock Turtlenecks and Teamwork	15:42:47
		28.3	From iCEO to CEO	15:51:45
Chapter 29	Apple Stores, Genius Bars and Siena Sandstone	29.1	The Customer Experience	15:59:31
		29.2	The Prototype	16:05:49
		29.3	Wood, Stone, Steel, Glass	16:15:58
Chapter 30	The Digital Hub, From iTunes to the iPod	30.1	Connecting the Dots	16:24:58
		30.2	FireWire	16:28:45
		30.3	iTunes	16:36:07
		30.4	The iPod	16:40:49
		30.5	That's It!	16:48:37
		30.6	The Whiteness of the Whale	16:56:47
Chapter 31	The iTunes Store, I'm the Pied Piper	31.1	Warner Music	17:06:39
		31.2	Herding Cats	17:19:12
		31.3	Microsoft	17:32:39
		31.4	Mr. Tambourine Man	17:42:46
Chapter 32	Music Man, The Sound Track of His Life	32.1	On His iPod	17:53:26
		32.2	Bob Dylan	18:05:05
		32.3	The Beatles	18:13:52
		32.4	Bono	18:18:31
		32.5	Yo-Yo Ma	18:31:21
Chapter 33	Pixar's Friends, ...and Foes	33.1	A Bug's Life	18:32:46
		33.2	Steve's Own Movie	18:44:06
		33.3	The Divorce	18:50:04
Chapter 34	Twenty-First-Century Macs, Setting Apple Apart	34.1	Clams, Ice Cubes, and Sunflowers	19:20:24
		34.2	Intel Inside	19:26:52
		34.3	Options	19:31:27
Chapter 35	Round One, Memento Mori	35.1	Cancer	19:41:35
		35.2	The Stanford Commencement	19:52:09
		35.3	A Lion at Fifty	19:56:07
Chapter 36	The iPhone, Three Revolutionary Products in One	36.1	An iPod That Makes Calls	20:16:05
		36.2	Multi-touch	20:21:25
		36.3	Gorilla Glass	20:30:04
		36.4	The Design	20:35:25
		36.5	The Launch	20:38:43
Chapter 37	Round Two, The Cancer Recurs	37.1	The Battles of 2008	20:43:19
		37.2	Memphis	21:01:25
		37.3	Return	21:16:02
Chapter 38	The iPad, Into the Post-PC Era	38.1	You Say You Want a Revolution	21:22:39
		38.2	The Launch, January 2010	21:30:43
		38.3	Advertising	21:44:29
		38.4	Apps	21:51:15
		38.5	Publishing and Journalism	21:58:20
Chapter 39	New Battles, And Echoes of Old Ones	39.1	Google: Open versus Closed	22:18:13
		39.2	Flash, the App Store, and Control	22:27:46
		39.3	Antennagate: Design versus Engineering	22:40:33
		39.4	Here Comes the Sun	22:54:44
Chapter 40	To Infinity, The Cloud, the Spaceship, and Beyond	40.1	The iPad 2	22:57:34
		40.2	iCloud	23:12:14
		40.3	A New Campus	23:23:32
Chapter 41	Round Three, The Twilight Struggle	41.1	Family Ties	23:32:37
		41.2	President Obama	23:49:08
		41.3	Third Medical Leave, 2011	23:58:04
		41.4	Visitors	24:10:16
		41.5	That Day Has Come	24:19:43
Chapter 42	Legacy, The Brightest Heaven of Invention	42.1	FireWire	24:32:27
		42.2	And One More Thing...	24:50:55
		42.3	Coda	25:01:48

== Reception ==
Janet Maslin's review of the book for The New York Times mixed mild criticisms with praise. Maslin wrote that Isaacson's biography presented "an encyclopedic survey of all that Mr. Jobs accomplished, replete with the passion and excitement that it deserves."

A number of Steve Jobs's family and close colleagues expressed disapproval, including Laurene Powell Jobs, Tim Cook and Jony Ive. Cook remarked that the biography did Jobs "a tremendous disservice", and that "it didn't capture the person. The person I read about there is somebody I would never have wanted to work with over all this time." Ive said of the book that "my regard couldn't be lower."

Commercially, the biography was a notable success, selling more than three million copies in the United States alone by 2015.

== Film adaptation ==
Steve Jobs is a drama film based on the life of Apple co-founder Steve Jobs, starring Michael Fassbender in the title role. The film is directed by Danny Boyle, produced by Scott Rudin, and written by Aaron Sorkin (with a screenplay adapted both from Isaacson's Steve Jobs as well as from interviews conducted by Sorkin).

== Other media ==
Extracts from the biography have been the feature of various magazines, in addition to interviews with the author, Walter Isaacson.

To memorialize Jobs's life after his death on October 5, 2011, TIME published a commemorative issue on October 8, 2011. The issue's cover featured a portrait of Jobs, taken by Norman Seeff, in which he is sitting in the lotus position holding the original Macintosh computer. The portrait was published in Rolling Stone in January 1984 and is featured on the back cover of Steve Jobs. The issue marked the eighth time Jobs has been featured on the cover of Time. The issue included a photographic essay by Diana Walker, a retrospective on Apple by Harry McCracken and Lev Grossman, and a six-page essay by Walter Isaacson. Isaacson's essay served as a preview of Steve Jobs and described Jobs pitching the book to him.

Bloomberg Businessweek also released a commemorative issue of its magazine remembering the life of Jobs. The cover of the magazine features Apple-like simplicity, with a black-and-white, up-close photo of Jobs and his years of birth and death. In tribute to Jobs's minimalist style, the issue was published without advertisements. It featured extensive essays by Steve Jurvetson, John Sculley, Sean Wisely, William Gibson, and Walter Isaacson. Similarly to Time's commemorative issue, Isaacson's essay served as a preview of Steve Jobs.

Fortune featured an exclusive extract of the biography on October 24, 2011, focusing on the "friend-enemy" relationship Jobs had with Bill Gates.

== Awards and honors ==
Even after a late release that year, the book became Amazon's #1 seller for 2011.

- 2012 Financial Times and Goldman Sachs Business Book of the Year Award, shortlist
- 2011 The New York Times bestseller
- 2011 Christian Science Monitor Best Book, nonfiction
- 2011 Time Magazine's Best Books of the Year

== See also ==
- 2011 in literature
- Apple Inc. development history
