= Sandra Bullock filmography =

Compilation of motion pictures

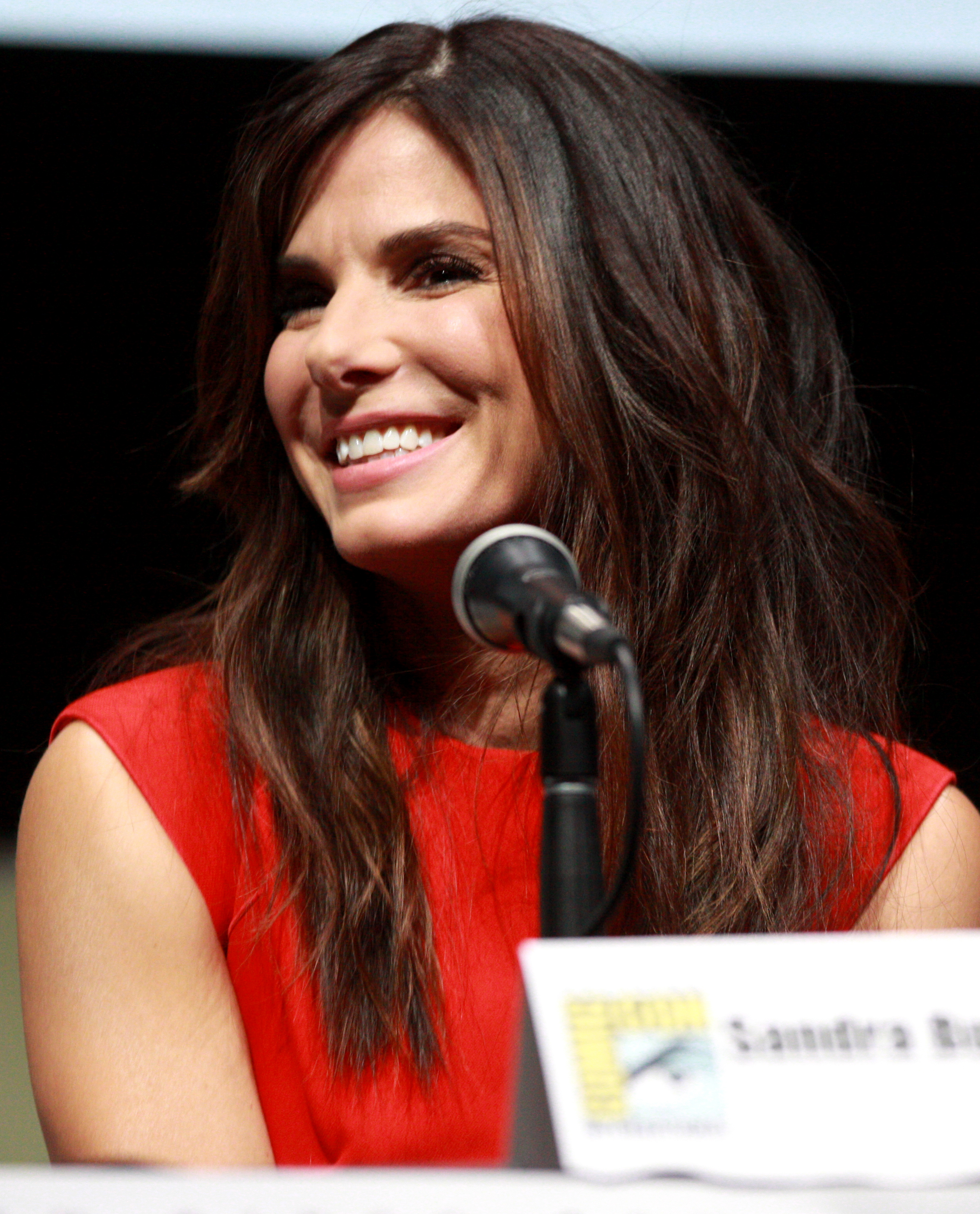
Bullock at the 2013 San Diego Comic-Con

Sandra Bullock is an American actress and producer who made her film debut with a minor role in J. Christian Ingvordsen's thriller Hangmen in 1987. She made her television debut in the television film Bionic Showdown: The Six Million Dollar Man and the Bionic Woman (1989) and played the lead role in the short-lived sitcom Working Girl (1990) before making her breakthrough starring in Jan de Bont's action film Speed (1994). In 1995, Bullock founded her own production company, Fortis Films, and starred in the romantic comedy While You Were Sleeping. Her performance in the film earned her first nomination for the Golden Globe Award for Best Actress – Motion Picture Comedy or Musical. In 1996, Bullock starred in the film adaptation of John Grisham's novel A Time to Kill. In 1998, Bullock starred in the romantic comedy Practical Magic, voiced Miriam in the DreamWorks animated film The Prince of Egypt, and executive produced her first film, Hope Floats.

In 2000, Bullock garnered a second nomination for the Golden Globe Award for Best Actress in a Motion Picture – Comedy or Musical for her role as undercover FBI agent Gracie Hart, in the comedy Miss Congeniality. In 2002, she executive produced her first television series George Lopez and starred with Hugh Grant in the romantic comedy Two Weeks Notice. In 2004, Bullock starred in the crime drama Crash and shared the Screen Actors Guild Award for Outstanding Performance by a Cast in a Motion Picture with the rest of the film's ensemble cast. In 2006, Bullock reunited with her Speed co-star Keanu Reeves in the romantic drama The Lake House, and she also played Harper Lee in the Truman Capote biographical film Infamous.

In 2009, Bullock starred in the films The Proposal, All About Steve, and The Blind Side. Bullock won the Academy Award for Best Actress for her performance in The Blind Side, and also received the Golden Raspberry Award for Worst Actress for All About Steve. In doing so, she became the first person to win both a Razzie and an Oscar in the same weekend. In 2013, Bullock starred in the films The Heat and Gravity. For her performance in the latter, she received the Saturn Award for Best Actress and was also nominated at the Academy Awards, British Academy Film Awards, and Golden Globe Awards. In 2015, Bullock voiced the supervillain Scarlet Overkill in the animated film Minions. As of August 2020, Minions is her highest-grossing film, with a worldwide box office total of over $1.1 billion. In 2018, Bullock starred in the heist comedy film Ocean's 8, a spin-off of the Ocean's franchise, which was a commercial success. That same year, she starred in the post-apocalyptic thriller Bird Box, which had the largest debut week viewership for a Netflix film.

== Film ==
Key
†	Denotes films that have not yet been released

Year	Title	Role(s)	Notes	Ref(s)
1987	Hangmen	Lisa Edwards		
1989	A Fool and His Money	Debby Cosgrove	Also known as Religion, Inc.; Direct-to-video	
1989	Who Shot Pat?	Devlin Moran	Direct-to-video	
1992	Love Potion No. 9	Diane Farrow		
1993	The Vanishing	Diane Shaver		
1993	When the Party's Over	Amanda		
1993	The Thing Called Love	Linda Lue Linden		
1993	Demolition Man	Lenina Huxley		
1993	Fire on the Amazon	Alyssa Rothman		
1993	Wrestling Ernest Hemingway	Elaine		
1994	Speed	Annie Porter		
1994	Who Do I Gotta Kill?	Lori	Also known as Me & the Mob; Direct-to-video	
1995	While You Were Sleeping	Lucy Eleanor Moderatz		
1995	The Net	Angela Bennett		
1996	Two If by Sea	Roz		
1996	A Time to Kill	Ellen Roark		
1996	In Love and War	Agnes von Kurowsky		
1997	Speed 2: Cruise Control	Annie Porter		
1998	Hope Floats	Birdee Pruitt	Also executive producer	
1998	Making Sandwiches	Melba Club	Short film; Also producer, director, and screenwriter	
1998	Practical Magic	Sally Owens		
1998	Welcome to Hollywood	Herself	Cameo	
1998	The Prince of Egypt	Miriam	Voice role	
1999	Forces of Nature	Sarah Lewis		
2000	Gun Shy	Judy Tipp	Also producer and executive album producer	
2000	28 Days	Gwen Cummings		
2000	Lisa Picard Is Famous	Herself	Cameo	
2000	Miss Congeniality	Gracie Hart	Also producer	
2002	Murder by Numbers	Det. Cassie Mayweather/Jessica Marie Hudson	Also executive producer	
2002	Divine Secrets of the Ya-Ya Sisterhood	Siddalee Walker		
2002	Two Weeks Notice	Lucy Kelson	Also producer	
2004	Crash	Jean Cabot		
2005	Loverboy	Mrs. Harker		
2005	Miss Congeniality 2: Armed and Fabulous	Gracie Hart	Also producer	
2006	The Lake House	Dr. Kate Forster		
2006	Infamous	Harper Lee		
2007	Premonition	Linda Hanson		
2008	No Subtitles Necessary: Laszlo & Vilmos	Herself	Documentary film	
2009	The Proposal	Margaret Tate	Also executive producer	
2009	All About Steve	Mary Horowitz	Also producer	
2009	The Blind Side	Leigh Anne Tuohy		
2011	Extremely Loud & Incredibly Close	Linda Schell		
2013	The Heat	Special Agent Sarah Ashburn		
2013	Gravity	Dr. Ryan Stone		
2013	Aningaaq	Dr. Ryan Stone	Short film; Voice role	
2013	The Prime Ministers: The Pioneers	Golda Meir	Documentary film; Voice role	
2015	Minions	Scarlet Overkill	Voice role	
2015	Our Brand Is Crisis	"Calamity" Jane Bodine	Also executive producer	
2018	Ocean's 8	Deborah 'Debbie' Ocean		
2018	Bird Box	Malorie Hayes	Also executive producer	
2021	The Unforgivable	Ruth Slater	Also producer	
2022	The Lost City	Loretta Sage / Dr. Angela Lovemore	Also producer	
2022	Bullet Train	Maria Beetle	Cameo	
2026	Practical Magic 2	Sally Owens	Also producer	

== Television ==
Year	Title	Role(s)	Notes	Ref.
1989	Bionic Showdown: The Six Million Dollar Man and the Bionic Woman	Kate Mason	Television film	
1989	Starting from Scratch	Barbara Webster	Episode: "Confidence Game"	
1989	The Preppie Murder	Stacy	Television film	
1990	Working Girl	Tess McGill	12 episodes	
1990	Lucky Chances	Maria Santangelo	Miniseries	
1996	Muppets Tonight	Herself	Episode: "Sandra Bullock"	
2002–2004	George Lopez	Amy Kirkland	3 episodes; Also executive producer	

== See also ==
- List of awards and nominations received by Sandra Bullock
