= Sandra Bullock =

American actress (born 1964)

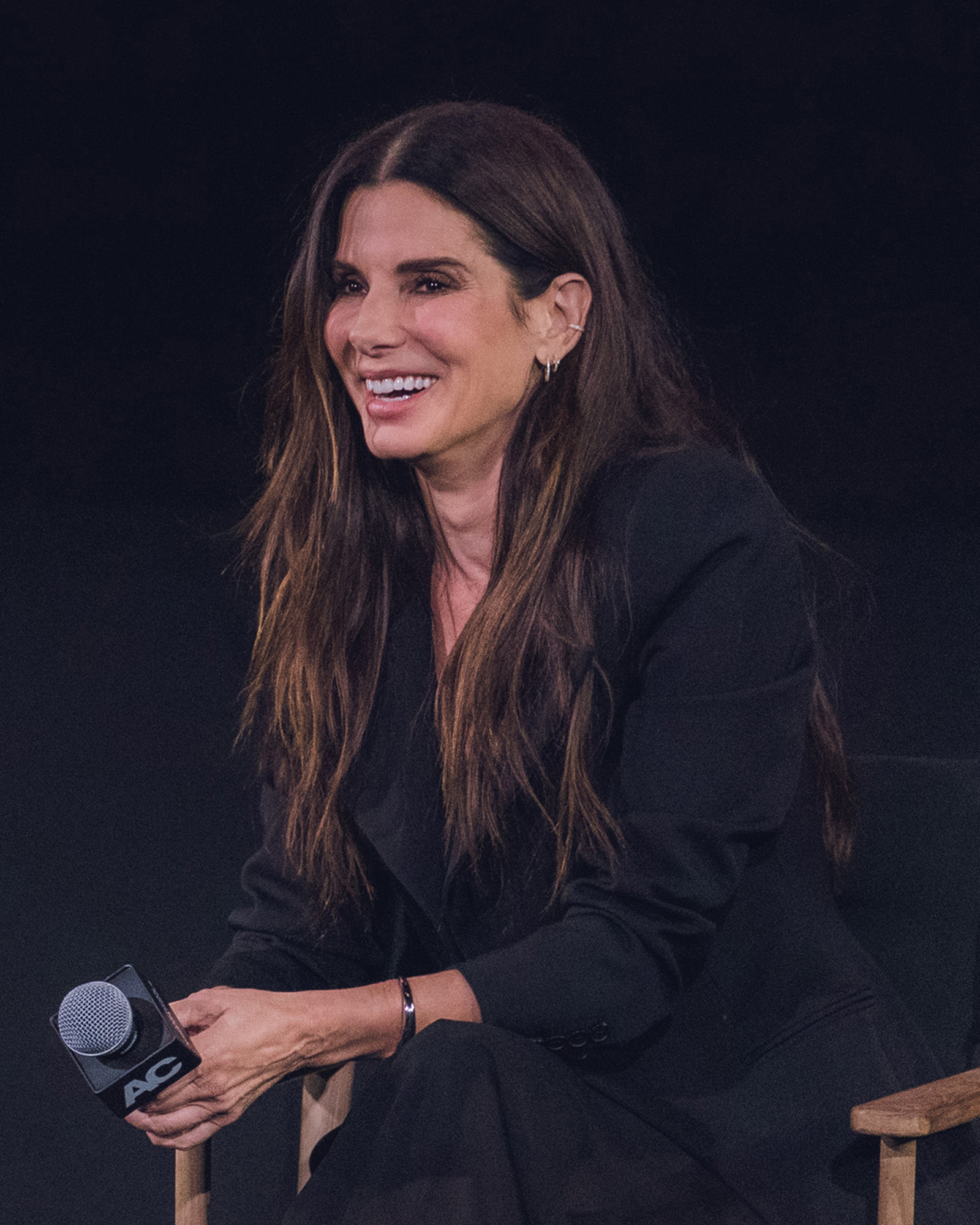
- Bullock in 2024
- Born: Sandra Annette Bullock; July 26, 1964 (age 62); Arlington County, Virginia, U.S.
- Citizenship: United States; Germany
- Education: East Carolina University (BFA)
- Occupations: Actress; producer
- Years active: 1987–present
- Works: Filmography
- Spouse: Jesse James (m. 2005; div. 2010)
- Partner(s): Bryan Randall (2015–2023; his death)
- Children: 2
- Relatives: Gesine Bullock-Prado (sister)
- Awards: Full list

Sandra Annette Bullock (born July 26, 1964) is a German-American actress and film producer. The world's highest-paid actress of 2010 and 2014, Bullock's filmography spans both comedy and drama, and her accolades include an Academy Award, a Golden Globe Award, two Screen Actors Guild Awards, and three Critics' Choice Movie Awards. She was named one of Time's 100 most influential people in the world in 2010.

After making her acting debut with a minor role in the thriller Hangmen (1987), Bullock received early attention for her supporting role in the action film Demolition Man (1993). Her breakthrough in the action thriller Speed (1994) led to leading roles in the romantic comedies While You Were Sleeping (1995) and Practical Magic (1998), and the dramas A Time to Kill (1996) and Hope Floats (1998). She achieved further success in the following decades with the comedies Miss Congeniality (2000), Two Weeks Notice (2002), The Proposal (2009), The Heat (2013), Ocean's 8 (2018), and The Lost City (2022); the dramas Crash (2004) and The Unforgivable (2021); and the thrillers Premonition (2007) and Bird Box (2018). For her portrayal of Leigh Anne Tuohy in the biographical drama The Blind Side (2009), Bullock won the Academy Award for Best Actress. She was nominated for the same award for playing an astronaut stranded in space in the science fiction thriller Gravity (2013), which is her highest-grossing live-action film.

In addition to acting, Bullock is the founder of the production company Fortis Films. She has produced some of the films in which she has starred, including Miss Congeniality 2: Armed and Fabulous (2005) and All About Steve (2009), and served as an executive producer on the ABC sitcom George Lopez (2002–2007), on which she made numerous appearances. Dubbed "America's sweetheart" by the media, Bullock was also named the Most Beautiful Woman by People magazine in 2015.

== Early life and education ==
Bullock was born on July 26, 1964, in Arlington County, Virginia, to Helga Mathilde (née Meyer; 1942–2000), an opera singer and voice teacher from Germany; and John Wilson Bullock (1925–2018), an Army employee and part-time voice coach from Birmingham, Alabama. Her father, who was in charge of the Army's Military Postal Service in Europe, was stationed in Nuremberg when he met her mother. Her parents married in Germany. Bullock's maternal grandfather was a German rocket scientist from Nuremberg. The family returned to Arlington, where her father worked with the Army Materiel Command before becoming a contractor for The Pentagon. Bullock has a younger sister, Gesine Bullock-Prado, who served as president of Bullock's production company Fortis Films.

For 12 years, Bullock lived in Nuremberg, West Germany, and Vienna and Salzburg, Austria, and grew up speaking German. She had a Waldorf education in Nuremberg. As a child, while her mother went on European opera tours, Bullock usually stayed with her aunt Christl and cousin Susanne, the latter of whom later married politician Peter Ramsauer. Bullock studied ballet and vocal arts as a child and frequently accompanied her mother, taking small parts in her opera productions. In Nuremberg, she sang in the opera's children's choir. Bullock has a scar above her left eye which was caused by a fall into a creek when she was a child. While she maintains her American citizenship, she applied for German citizenship in 2009.

Bullock attended Washington-Lee High School, where she was a cheerleader and performed in school theater productions. After graduating in 1982, she attended East Carolina University in Greenville, North Carolina, where she received a BFA in Drama in 1987. While at East Carolina, she performed in theater productions, including Peter Pan and Three Sisters. She then moved to Manhattan, New York, where she supported herself as a bartender, cocktail waitress, and coat checker while auditioning for roles.

== Career ==
=== Early roles and breakthrough (1987–1995) ===
While in New York, Bullock took acting classes with Sanford Meisner. She appeared in several student films and later landed a role in an Off-Broadway play No Time Flat. Director Alan J. Levi was impressed by Bullock's performance and offered her a part in the made-for-television film Bionic Showdown: The Six Million Dollar Man and the Bionic Woman (1989). This led to her being cast in a series of small roles in several independent films, and in the lead role of the short-lived NBC television version of the film Working Girl (1990). She went on to appear in several films, such as Love Potion No. 9 (1992), The Thing Called Love (1993) and Fire on the Amazon (1993), before her supporting role in the sci-fi action film Demolition Man (1993).

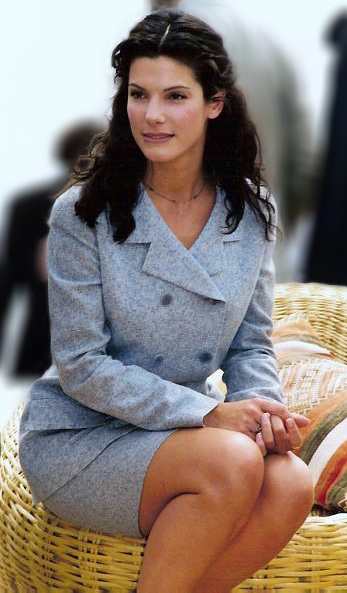
Bullock at the 1996 Cannes Film Festival

In 1994, she played Annie Porter, a passenger eventually driving a bus that was rigged by a terrorist, in the smash-hit blockbuster Speed alongside Keanu Reeves. She was required to read for Speed to ensure that there was the right chemistry between her and Reeves. She recalls they had to do "all these really physical scenes together, rolling around on the floor and stuff." Speed received critical acclaim, with Rotten Tomatoes calling it a "terrific popcorn thriller [with] outstanding performances from Keanu Reeves, Dennis Hopper, and Sandra Bullock", and it grossed $350 million worldwide, and helped establish Bullock as a Hollywood actress. She won Best Actress at the 21st Saturn Awards, and Best Female Performance and Most Desirable Female at the 1995 MTV Movie Awards.

Bullock headlined the romantic comedy While You Were Sleeping (1995) as a lonely Chicago Transit Authority token collector who saves the life of a man. The film had a positive reception from critics, who felt that it was "assembled with such skill—and with such a charming performance from Sandra Bullock—that it gives formula a good name." She received her first nomination for the Golden Globe Award for Best Actress – Motion Picture Comedy or Musical. The thriller The Net (also 1995), starred Bullock as a computer programmer who stumbles upon a conspiracy that puts her life and the lives of those around her in great danger. Owen Gleiberman, writing for Entertainment Weekly, complimented her performance, saying, "Bullock pulls you into the movie. Her overripe smile and clear, imploring eyes are sometimes evocative of Julia Roberts". While You Were Sleeping and The Net made $182 million and $110.6 million, respectively.

=== Worldwide recognition (1996–2007) ===
In A Time to Kill (1996), a legal drama based on John Grisham's 1989 novel of the same name, Bullock portrayed a member of the defense team in the trial for the murder of two men who raped a young girl, opposite Samuel L. Jackson, Matthew McConaughey and Kevin Spacey. She received an MTV Movie Award nomination for Best Female Performance. She subsequently received $11 million for Speed 2: Cruise Control (1997), which she agreed to star in for financial backing for her next project, Hope Floats (1998). Unlike the original film, Speed 2 was a critical and commercial flop that she later disparaged. In Hope Floats, she starred as an unassuming housewife whose life is disrupted when her husband (played by Michael Paré) reveals his infidelity to her on a talk show. Critic James Berardinelli remarked that her "undisputed strength lies in a blend of light drama and comedy". That film was a commercial success, grossing $81.4 million worldwide.

Bullock starred in the comedy Practical Magic (1998) alongside Nicole Kidman as two witch sisters who face a curse which threatens to prevent them ever finding lasting love. While the film opened atop the chart on its North American opening weekend, it flopped at the box office. That year, she voiced Miriam in the DreamWorks Animation film The Prince of Egypt and wrote, produced, and directed the short film Making Sandwiches. She next played a free-spirited drifter who begins to talk to a writer (Ben Affleck) in the romantic comedy Forces of Nature (1999), on which Boxoffice Magazine remarked: "The combination of Affleck's deadpan by-the-book persona with the spontaneity of Bullock's character sparks with convincing chemistry." Forces of Nature made $93 million worldwide. Bullock took on the role of an FBI agent who must go undercover as a beauty pageant contestant in the comedy Miss Congeniality (2000), which became another financial success, with a global gross of $212 million. It earned her a second nomination for the Golden Globe Award for Best Actress – Motion Picture Comedy or Musical. In 28 Days (also 2000), a dramedy directed by Betty Thomas, Bullock starred as a newspaper columnist obliged to enter a rehabilitation program for alcoholism.

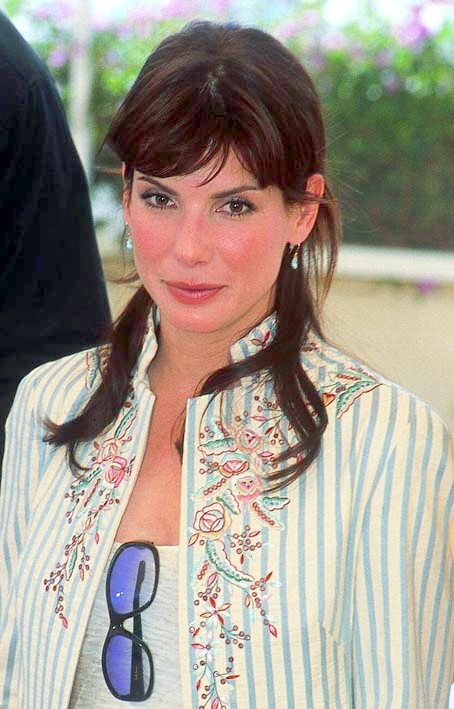
Bullock at the 2002 Cannes Film Festival

Bullock starred in the psychological thriller Murder by Numbers (2002) as a seasoned homicide detective. Roger Ebert awarded the film three stars out of a possible four, stating: "Bullock does a good job here of working against her natural likability, creating a character you'd like to like, and could like, if she weren't so sad, strange and turned in upon herself." She teamed up with Hugh Grant for the romantic comedy Two Weeks Notice (also 2002), in which she starred as a lawyer who walks out on her boss. Liz Braun, of Jam! Movies, found Bullock and Grant to be "perfectly paired", stating: "The script allows the two actors to be at their comedic best, even though the film as a whole is amateurish in many ways". Two Weeks Notice made $199 million globally. That year, she was presented with the Raul Julia Award for Excellence for helping expand career openings for Hispanic talent in the media and entertainment industry as the executive producer of the sitcom George Lopez (2002–2007). She also made several appearances on the show as Accident Amy, an accident-prone employee at the factory Lopez's character manages.

As part of a large ensemble cast, Bullock played the wife of a district attorney in the drama Crash (2004), which won the Academy Award for Best Picture. She received positive reviews for her performance, with some critics suggesting that it was the best performance of her career to that point. For Crash, she received the Actor Award for Outstanding Performance by a Cast in a Motion Picture along with the rest of the cast. She next received a $17.5 million salary for Miss Congeniality 2: Armed and Fabulous, which Roger Ebert called a "doubly unnecessary" sequel. She was a co-recipient of the 2005 Women in Film Crystal Award. In 2006, Bullock reunited with Keanu Reeves for the romantic drama The Lake House, although their characters were separated throughout the film and they were only on set together for two weeks during filming, and played Harper Lee in Infamous, a drama based on George Plimpton's 1997 book Truman Capote, alongside Toby Jones and Daniel Craig. The Lake House was a financial success, while Infamous received generally positive reviews. Bullock headlined the supernatural thriller Premonition (2007) as a housewife who experiences the days surrounding her husband's death in non-chronological order. Despite negative reviews, the film grossed $84.1 million worldwide.

=== Established career (2008–2014) ===
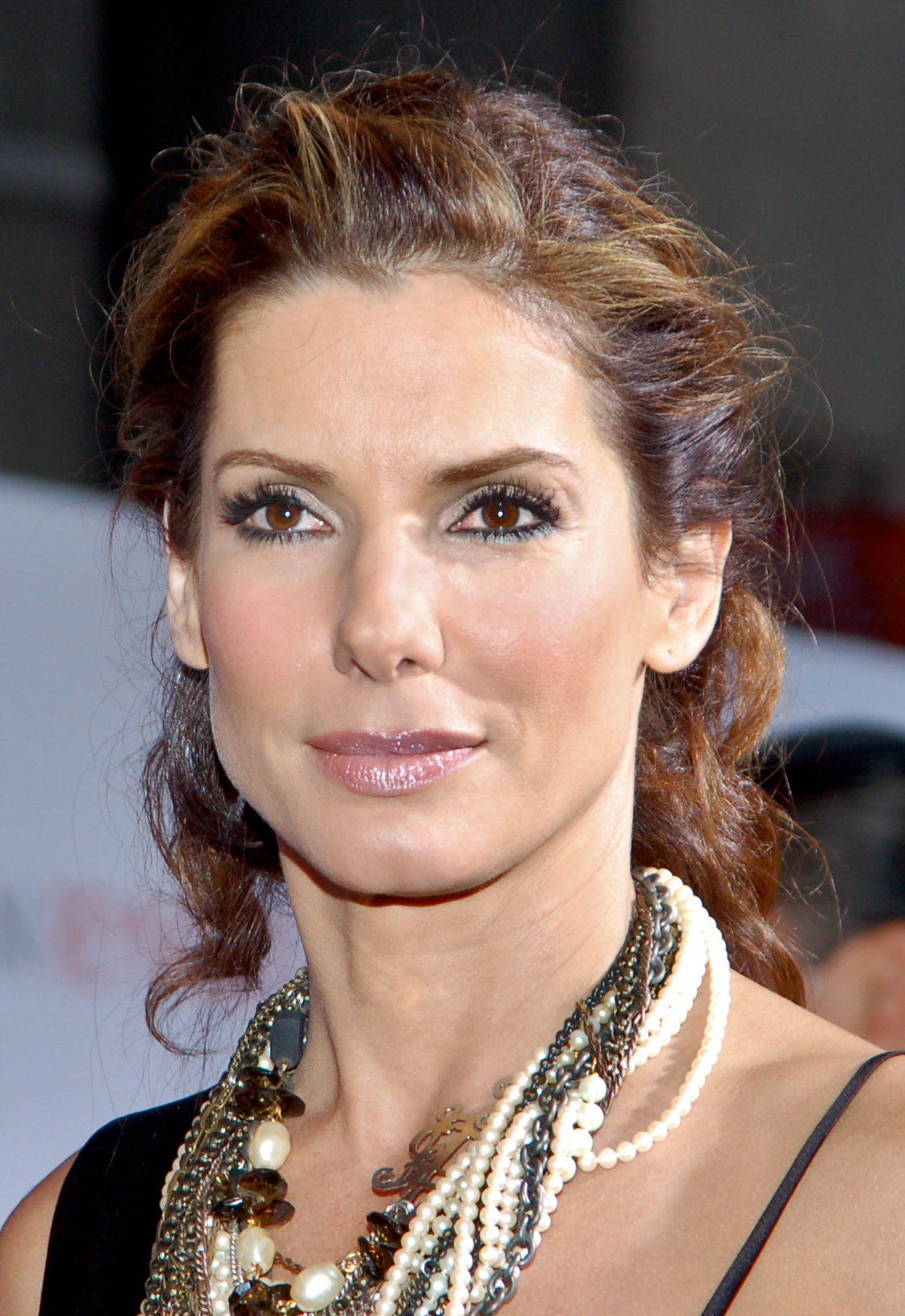
Bullock at the premiere of The Proposal in 2009

In 2009, Bullock starred as a pushy editor-in-chief in the romantic comedy The Proposal, opposite Ryan Reynolds, which grossed $317 million at the worldwide box office, making it her fourth-most successful picture to date. She received her third nomination for the Golden Globe Award for Best Actress – Motion Picture Comedy or Musical. That same year, the drama The Blind Side opened at number two behind New Moon with $34.2 million, making it Bullock's second-highest opening weekend ever; it went on to gross over $309 million, making it her highest-grossing domestic film, her fourth-highest-grossing film worldwide, and the first one in history to pass the $200 million mark with only one top-billed female star. Bullock portrayed Leigh Anne Tuohy, the adoptive mother of Michael Oher, a role she had initially turned down three times due to discomfort in portraying a devout Christian. She was awarded the Academy Award, Golden Globe Award, Actor Award and Critics' Choice Movie Award for Best Actress. The Blind Side also received a nomination for the Academy Award for Best Picture. Winning the Oscar also gave Bullock another unique distinction: the prior night, she won the Razzie Award for Worst Actress for her performance as an eccentric crossword writer in All About Steve (2009), becoming the only actor in history to win both awards for the same year.

By 2010, Bullock was said to be "courted for virtually every female starring role Hollywood has to offer", according to Entertainment Weekly. Ben Affleck, her co-star in the romantic comedy Forces of Nature (1999), stated: "Every movie you hear about and every script I see, they say, 'We're going after Sandra Bullock for the woman'." She decided to eschew "the torrent of offers" in favour of "quietly [putting] acting on hold" to focus on her personal life. She also became "more selective" with the projects that she accepted, on which she said: "As I've gotten older, I say 'No' a lot more. I've become a better fighter for my work. I didn't have the guts to do that before". In 2010, she was the world's highest-paid actress. She would next star alongside Tom Hanks as a widow of the September 11 attacks in the drama Extremely Loud & Incredibly Close (2011), a film adaptation based on the novel of the same name. Despite mixed reviews, the film was nominated for numerous awards, including an Academy Award for Best Picture. Bullock was nominated for Favorite Actress Drama by Teen Choice Awards.

In 2013, Bullock starred alongside Melissa McCarthy in the comedy The Heat as an FBI Special Agent who, along with a city detective, must take down a mobster in Boston. It received positive reviews from critics, and took in $230 million at the worldwide box office. Bullock subsequently played an astronaut stranded in space in the sci-fi thriller Gravity, opposite George Clooney, which premiered at the 70th Venice Film Festival and was released on October 4, 2013, to coincide with the beginning of World Space Week. Gravity received universal critical acclaim and a standing ovation in Venice. The film was called "the most realistic and beautifully choreographed film ever set in space" and certain critics considered Bullock's performance to be the best of her career. Gravity grossed $716 million worldwide to become Bullock's second-most successful film. For her role as Dr. Ryan Stone, Bullock was nominated for the Academy Award, Golden Globe Award, BAFTA Award, Actor Award, and Critics' Choice Movie Award for Best Actress. On her performance, Variety wrote: Bullock inhabits the role with grave dignity and hints at Stone's past scars with sensitivity and tact, and she holds the screen effortlessly once Gravity becomes a veritable one-woman show [...] the actress remains fully present emotionally, projecting a very appealing combo of vulnerability, intelligence and determination that not only wins us over immediately, but sustains attention all the way through the cathartic closing reels. In 2014, she was Hollywood's highest-paid actress.

=== Success with limited work (2015–present) ===
Bullock provided her voice for Scarlet Overkill, the villainous character, in the animated film Minions (2015), which became her highest-grossing film to date with a worldwide gross of over $1.1 billion. In 2015, she served as an executive producer and starred, as a political consultant hired to help win a Bolivian presidential election, in the drama Our Brand Is Crisis, based on the 2005 documentary film of the same name by Rachel Boynton. Peter Debruge of Variety found Bullock's portrayal to be "easily one of the best female roles of the last 10 years", but film had the worst wide release opening of her career.

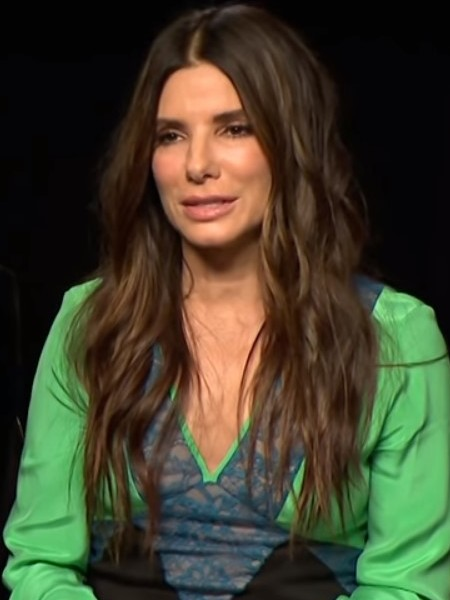
Bullock promoting Ocean's 8 in 2018

In Ocean's 8 (2018), an all-female spin-off of the Ocean's Eleven franchise directed by Gary Ross, Bullock played Debbie Ocean, the sister of Danny Ocean, who helps plan a sophisticated heist of the annual Met Gala in New York City. Writing for The Hollywood Reporter, Josh Spieger called the film a "welcome return to the big screen for Bullock" and observed: "She has reached a point in her career where she chooses her roles with care; before Gravity, she'd only co-starred in a handful of films over the previous five years, including her Oscar-winning turn in The Blind Side. Ocean's 8 is Bullock's first true franchise film in decades [...] and it suggests that her decision to be more selective in which projects she picks can pay off in dividends". Ocean's 8 had the best debut for the franchise, and ultimately made $297 million globally.

Her next role was that of Malorie, a woman who must find a way to guide herself and her children to safety despite the potential threat from an unseen adversary, in the Netflix post-apocalyptic horror film Bird Box (2018), based on the novel of the same name. She received acclaim for her performance, with Variety and The Wrap describing it as "wonderfully self-reliant", and "fascinating and terrifying to watch," respectively. Bird Box was the most-watched film on Netflix within 28 days of its release until 2021. In another production for Netflix, Nora Fingscheidt's drama The Unforgivable (2021), Bullock played a woman who is released from prison after serving a sentence for a violent crime. Writing for Salon.com, Gary Kramer thought Bullock gave a "steely performance" despite the film being "forgettable". The Unforgivable became the fifth most-streamed on the platform at the time of its release.

She took on the role of a successful yet depressed best-selling romance novelist in Paramount Pictures' The Lost City (2022), a Romancing the Stone-style romantic comedy–adventure film, directed by Adam and Aaron Nee, opposite Channing Tatum and Daniel Radcliffe. The film was favorably received by critics, who praised the chemistry between Bullock and Tatum, and grossed $190.8 million globally, which made Bullock "the first actress to have $100 million earners in live-action star vehicles over four different decades", according to Forbes. She also featured in the Brad Pitt-starring action thriller Bullet Train (2022), in a mostly vocal performance.

She reprised her role as Sally Owens in Practical Magic 2, released on September 18, 2026.

== Other endeavors ==
=== Business ventures ===
Bullock owns the production company Fortis Films, through which she has served as a producer for several of her star vehicles, including Hope Floats (1998), Miss Congeniality (2000), Two Weeks Notice (2002) and Miss Congeniality 2: Armed and Fabulous (2005), as well as for the sitcom George Lopez (2002–2007). Her father, John Bullock, was the company's CEO and her sister, Gesine Bullock-Prado, is the former president. The company is headquartered in Austin, Texas, and West Hollywood, California.

In November 2006, Bullock founded an Austin, Texas, restaurant named Bess Bistro which was located on West 6th Street. She later opened another business, Walton's Fancy and Staple, across the street in a building she extensively renovated. Walton's is a bakery, upscale restaurant, and floral shop that also offers services including event planning. After almost nine years in business, Bess Bistro closed on September 20, 2015.

=== Philanthropy ===
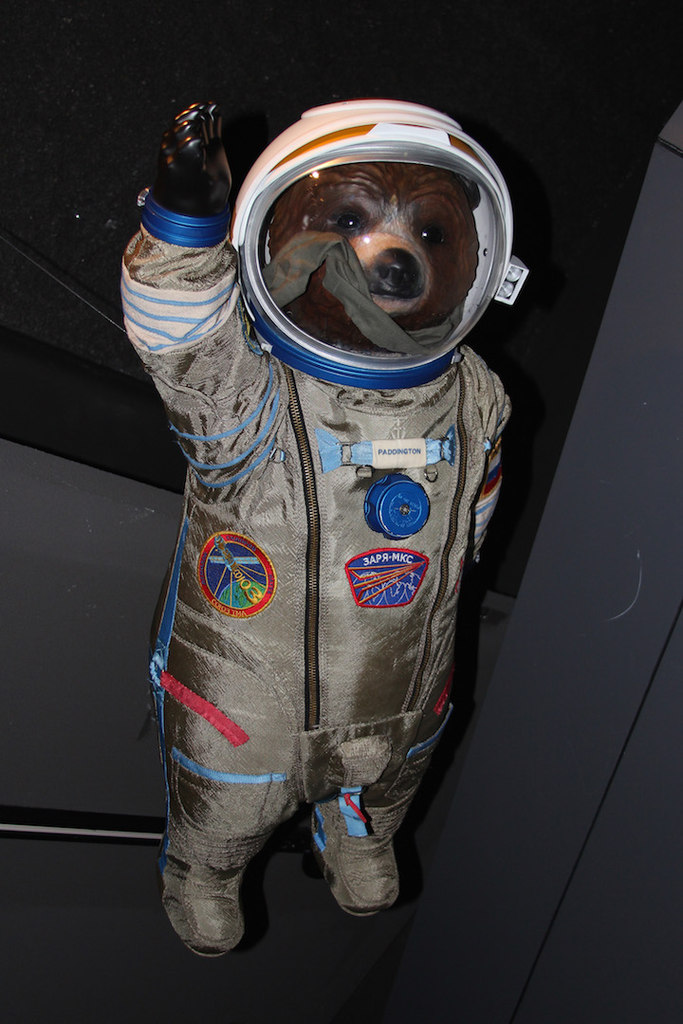
Bullock's space-themed Paddington Bear statue—"Gravity Bear"—in London, auctioned to raise funds for the National Society for the Prevention of Cruelty to Children (NSPCC)

Bullock has been a public supporter of the American Red Cross and has donated $1 million to the organization at least five times. Her first public donation of that amount was to the Liberty Disaster Relief Fund. Three years later, she sent money in response to the 2004 Indian Ocean earthquake and tsunamis. In 2010, she donated $1 million to relief efforts in Haiti following the Haiti earthquake and again donated the same amount following the 2011 Tōhoku earthquake and tsunami. She donated $1 million in 2017 to support relief efforts for Hurricane Harvey in Texas.

In 2010, along with other public figures, Bullock made a public service announcement urging people to sign a petition for clean-up efforts of the Deepwater Horizon oil spill in the Gulf of Mexico. Bullock was inducted into the Warren Easton Hall of Fame in 2012, for her donations to charities, and was honored with the Favorite Humanitarian Award at the 39th People's Choice Awards, for her contributions to New Orleans's Warren Easton High School, which was severely damaged by Hurricane Katrina.

In 2014, Bullock designed a space-themed Paddington Bear statue, dubbed "Gravity Bear" (a reference to her 2013 film Gravity). The statue, number 43 out of 58 placed around London as part of the Paddington Trail, was located at the Royal Observatory in Greenwich, and was subsequently auctioned off to raise funds for the National Society for the Prevention of Cruelty to Children (NSPCC).

== Public image ==
Bullock has been dubbed "America's sweetheart" by the media in reference to her "friendly and direct and so unpretentious" nature. She was selected as one of People magazine's 50 Most Beautiful People in the world in 1996, 1999, and 2011. The publication named her as its Woman of the Year in 2010 as well as the Most Beautiful Woman in 2015.

In 2010, Time magazine included Bullock in its annual Time 100 as one of the most influential people in the world, and Entertainment Weekly named her The Most Powerful Actress in Hollywood. In 2013, she joined other Hollywood legends at the TCL Chinese Theatre on Hollywood Boulevard in making imprints of her hands and feet in cement of the theater's forecourt. That year, she was named among The Most Powerful Women in Entertainment by The Hollywood Reporter, and Entertainer of the Year, due to her success with The Heat and Gravity, by Entertainment Weekly. Bullock ranked #2 on the 2014 Forbes' list of most powerful actresses and was honored with the Decade of Hotness Award by Spike Guys' Choice Awards.

== Personal life ==
Bullock owns properties in Los Angeles, Austin and New Orleans.

On December 20, 2000, she was in a private jet crash on a runway from which she and the two crew escaped uninjured. Pilot error and blizzard conditions were responsible. The crew was unable to activate the runway lights during a night landing at Jackson Hole Airport.

Bullock won a multimillion-dollar judgment against Benny Daneshjou, the builder of her Lake Austin, Texas, home in October 2004. The jury ruled that the house was uninhabitable. It has since been torn down and rebuilt. Daneshjou and his insurer later settled with Bullock for roughly half the awarded verdict.

While Bullock was in Massachusetts on April 18, 2008, shooting The Proposal, she and her then-husband Jesse James were in a vehicle that was hit head-on by a drunk driver. They were uninjured.

=== Relationships and family ===
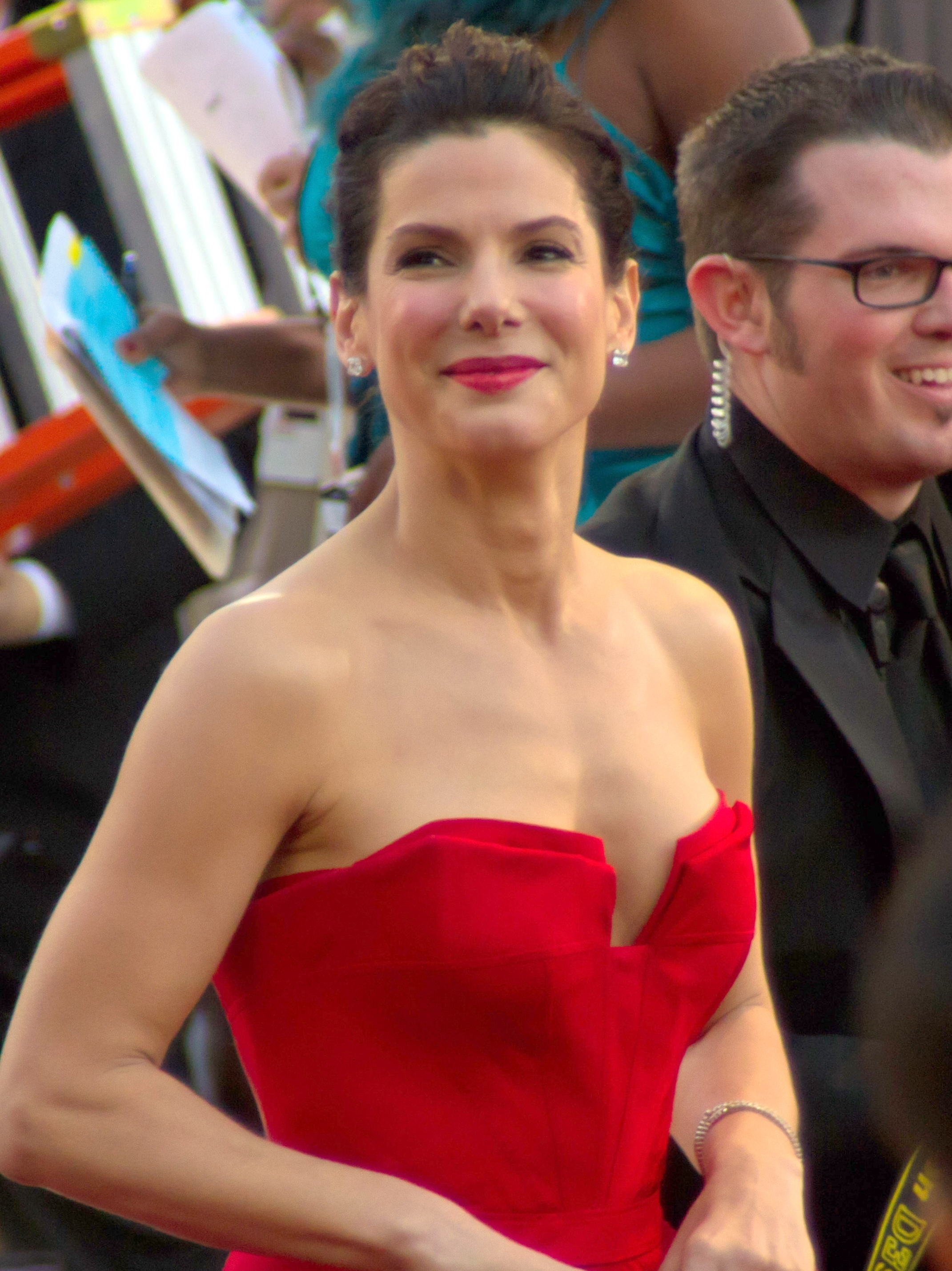
Bullock at the 83rd Academy Awards in 2011

Bullock was once engaged to actor Tate Donovan, whom she met while filming Love Potion No. 9. Their relationship lasted from 1990 to 1994. She dated football player Troy Aikman and actors Matthew McConaughey and Ryan Gosling.

Bullock married motorcycle builder and Monster Garage host Jesse James on July 16, 2005. They first met when Bullock arranged for her ten-year-old godson to meet James as a Christmas present. In November 2009, Bullock and James entered into a custody battle with James's second ex-wife, former adult film actress Janine Lindemulder, with whom James had a child. Bullock and James subsequently won full legal custody of James's five-year-old daughter.

A scandal arose in March 2010 when several women claimed to have had affairs with James during his marriage to Bullock. Bullock canceled European promotional appearances for The Blind Side citing "unforeseen personal reasons". On March 18, James responded to the rumors of infidelity by issuing a public apology to Bullock. He stated, "The vast majority of the allegations reported are untrue and unfounded [...] beyond that, I will not dignify these private matters with any further public comment." James declared, "There is only one person to blame for this whole situation, and that is me." He asked that Bullock and their children one day "find it in their hearts to forgive me" for their "pain and embarrassment". James's publicist subsequently announced on March 30 that James had checked into a rehabilitation facility to "deal with personal issues" and save his relationship to Bullock. On April 23, Bullock filed for divorce in Austin, Texas. Their divorce was finalized on June 28, with "conflict of personalities" given as the reason.

Bullock announced in 2010 that she had proceeded with plans to adopt a son born in January 2010 in New Orleans, Louisiana. Bullock and James had begun an initial adoption process four months earlier. Bullock's son began living with them in January 2010 but they chose to keep the news private until after the Oscars ceremony that March. Given the pair's split and subsequent divorce, Bullock continued the adoption of her son as a single parent. Bullock announced in December 2015 that she had adopted a second child and appeared on the cover of People magazine with her then three-year-old new daughter.

Bullock was in a relationship with photographer Bryan Randall from mid-2015 until Randall's death due to ALS on August 5, 2023.

=== Stalking incidents ===
Beginning in 2002, Bullock was stalked across several states by a man named Thomas James Weldon. She obtained a restraining order against him in 2003, which was renewed in 2006. After the restraining order expired and Weldon was released from a mental institution, he again traveled through several states to find Bullock; she then obtained another restraining order.

On April 22, 2007, a woman named Marcia Diana Valentine was found lying outside James and Bullock's home in Orange County, California. When James confronted the woman, she ran to her car, got behind the wheel and tried to run him over. She was said to be an obsessed fan of Bullock. Valentine was charged with one felony count each of aggravated assault and stalking. Bullock obtained a restraining order to bar Valentine from "contacting or coming near her home, family or work for three years". Valentine pleaded not guilty to charges of aggravated assault and stalking. She was subsequently convicted of stalking and sentenced to three years' probation.

Joshua James Corbett broke into Bullock's Los Angeles home in June 2014. Bullock locked herself in a room and dialed 911. Corbett pleaded no contest in 2017 and was sentenced to five years' probation for stalking Bullock and breaking into her residence. He was then subject to a ten-year protective order that required him to stay away from Bullock. After Corbett missed a court date the previous month, police officers went to his parents' residence on May 2, 2018, where he lived in a guest house, to arrest him. He refused to leave and threatened to shoot officers. A SWAT team was called and, after a five-hour standoff, they deployed gas canisters and entered the house where they found Corbett had killed himself. Corbett's death was the result of "multiple incised wounds" according to the Los Angeles County coroner.

== Filmography and accolades ==
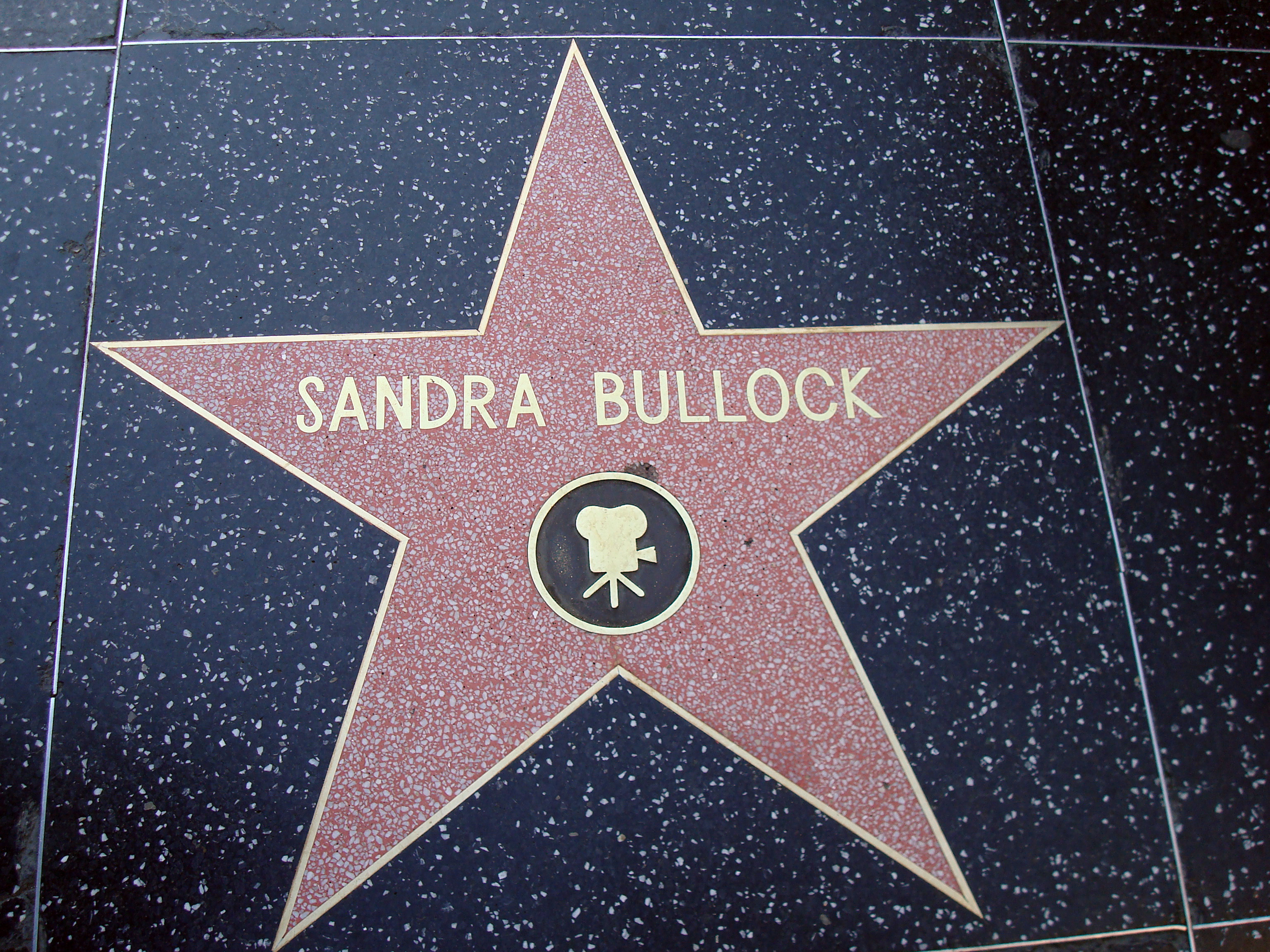
Bullock's star on the Hollywood Walk of Fame

Bullock has starred in over 50 films, and has helped produce over 15 works in film and television. Her highest-grossing releases are Speed (1994), A Time to Kill (1996), The Prince of Egypt (1998), Miss Congeniality (2000), The Proposal (2009), The Blind Side (2009), The Heat (2013), Gravity (2013), Minions (2015), and Ocean's 8 (2018).

On March 24, 2005, Bullock received a motion picture star on the Hollywood Walk of Fame at 6801 Hollywood Boulevard in Hollywood. Her performance in the biographical drama film The Blind Side (2009) garnered her the Academy Award for Best Actress, the Golden Globe Award for Best Actress in a Motion Picture – Drama and the Actor Award for Outstanding Performance by a Female Actor in a Leading Role. Bullock was nominated again in these categories for her performance in the film Gravity (2013).
