= List of awards and nominations received by Sandra Bullock =

Sandra Bullock awards and nominations
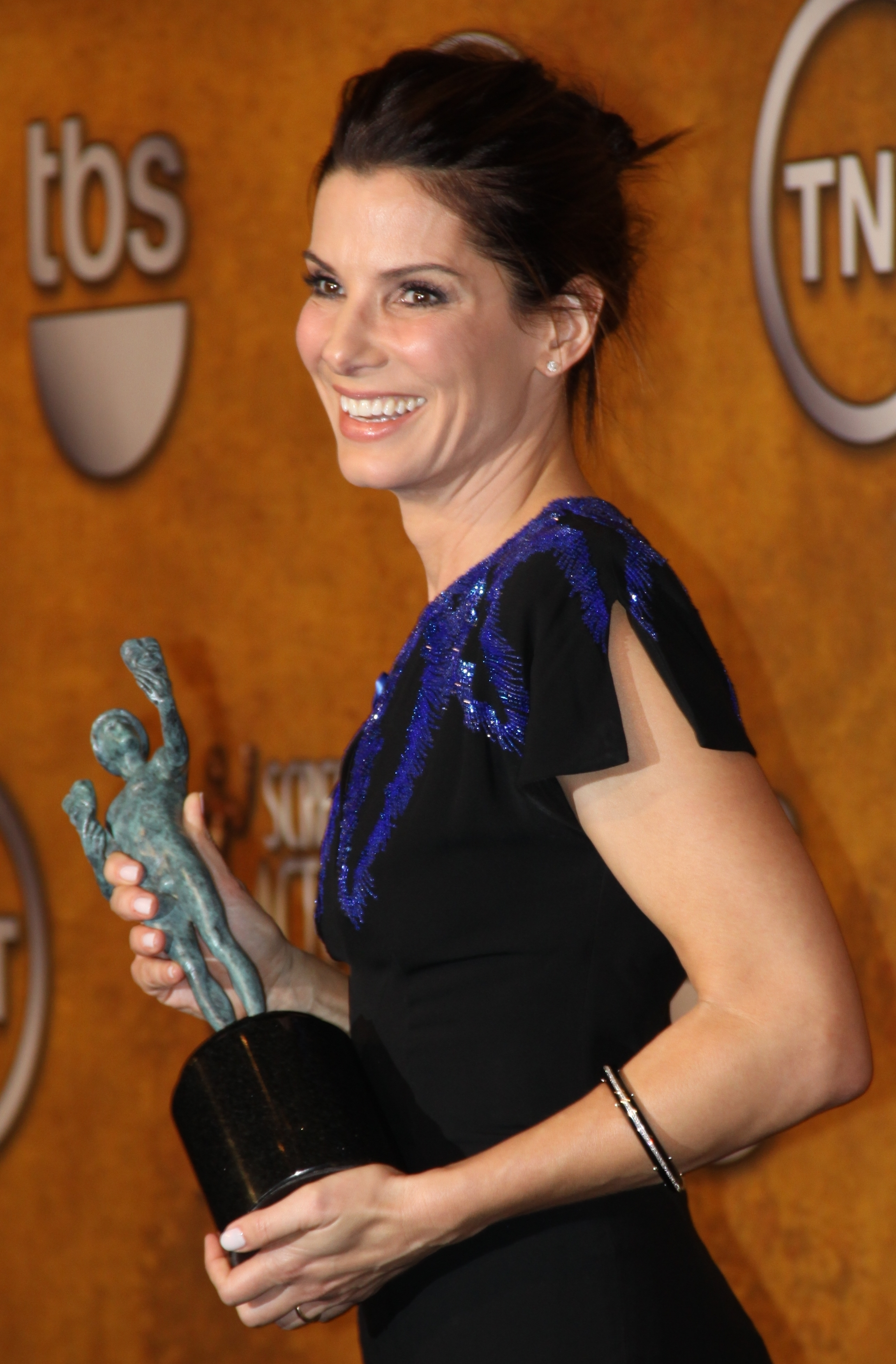
- Bullock at the 16th Screen Actors Guild Awards in 2010
Awards and nominations
Award	Wins	Nominations
AACTA International Awards	0	1
Academy Awards	1	2
African-American Film Critics Association Awards	1	1
Alliance of Women Film Journalists Awards	3	6
American Comedy Awards	1	3
Awards Circuit Community Awards	1	3
Bambi Awards	1	1
Blockbuster Entertainment Awards	5	6
Bravo Otto Awards	2	6
British Academy Film Awards	0	1
Chicago Film Critics Association Awards	0	2
CinEuphoria Awards	0	1
Costume Designers Guild Awards	1	1
Critics' Choice Movie Awards	3	5
Critics' Choice Super Awards	0	1
Dallas–Fort Worth Film Critics Association Awards	0	2
Denver Film Critics Society Awards	0	2
Dorian Awards	0	1
Dublin Film Critics Circle Awards	0	1
Empire Awards	0	1
Georgia Film Critics Association Awards	0	2
Golden Apple Awards	1	1
Golden Globe Awards	1	5
Golden Raspberry Awards	2	5
Gotham Independent Film Awards	0	1
Hasty Pudding Theatricals Awards	1	1
Hollywood Film Awards	4	4
Houston Film Critics Society Awards	1	2
IndieWire Critics Poll	0	1
Iowa Film Critics Awards	0	1
Irish Film & Television Academy Awards	0	1
Joseph Plateau Awards	1	1
Jupiter Awards	5	5
Kansas City Film Critics Circle Awards	1	1
London Critics' Circle Film Awards	0	1
Lone Star Film & Television Awards	1	1
Montreal World Film Festival Awards	1	1
MTV Movie & TV Awards	5	17
NAACP Image Awards	0	1
Nickelodeon Kids' Choice Awards	0	8
North Carolina Film Critics Association Awards	0	1
North Texas Film Critics Association Awards	1	1
Online Film & Television Association Awards	0	3
Palm Springs International Film Festival Awards	1	1
People's Choice Awards	10	20
Phoenix Film Critics Society Awards	0	1
Rembrandt Awards	1	1
Russian National Movie Awards	0	2
San Diego Film Critics Society Awards	0	2
San Francisco Film Critics Circle Awards	0	1
Santa Barbara International Film Festival Awards	1	1
Satellite Awards	0	3
Saturn Awards	2	2
Screen Actors Guild Awards	2	3
Seattle Film Critics Society Awards	0	1
ShoWest Convention Awards	2	2
St. Louis Film Critics Association Awards	0	1
Teen Choice Awards	9	20
Utah Film Critics Association Awards	0	1
Vancouver Film Critics Circle Awards	0	1
Virginia Film Festival Awards	1	1
Washington D.C. Area Film Critics Association Awards	0	2
Women Film Critics Circle Awards	1	1
Women's Image Network Awards	1	2
Women in Film Crystal + Lucy Awards	1	1

Totals (Note: Certain award groups do not simply award one winner. They acknowledge several different recipients, have runners-up, and have third place. Since this is a specific recognition and is different from losing an award, runner-up mentions are considered wins in this award tally. For simplification and to avoid errors, each award in this list has been presumed to have had a prior nomination.)
- Wins: 76
- Nominations: 182

American actress and producer Sandra Bullock has received numerous accolades throughout her career, including nominations for two Academy Awards, one British Academy Film Award, three Screen Actors Guild Awards, and five Golden Globe Awards.

For her performance in the biographical drama film The Blind Side (2009), Bullock received the Academy Award for Best Actress, the Golden Globe Award for Best Actress in a Motion Picture – Drama, and the Screen Actors Guild Award for Outstanding Performance by a Female Actor in a Leading Role. She was once again nominated in these same categories, as well as for the BAFTA Award for Best Actress in a Leading Role, for her performance in the science fiction film Gravity (2013).

In 2005, Bullock was honored with the 2,281st star on the Hollywood Walk of Fame, in recognition of her contributions to the motion picture industry.

== Awards and nominations ==
Awards and nominations received by Sandra BullockName of the award ceremony, year presented, category, nominated work, and the result of the nomination
Award ceremony	Year	Category (Note: Nominations are listed by wins first and sorted alphabetically)	Nominated work	Result	Ref.
AACTA International Awards	2014	Best Lead Actress	Gravity	Nominated	
Academy Awards	2010	Best Actress	The Blind Side	Won	
Academy Awards	2014	Best Actress	Gravity	Nominated	
African-American Film Critics Association Awards	2013	Best Actress	Gravity	Won	
Alliance of Women Film Journalists Awards	2011	Humanitarian Activism Award	—N/a	Won	
Alliance of Women Film Journalists Awards	2012	Humanitarian Activism Award	—N/a	Nominated	
Alliance of Women Film Journalists Awards	2013	Actress Defying Age and Ageism	Gravity	Won	
Alliance of Women Film Journalists Awards	2013	Kick Ass Award for Best Female Action Star	Gravity	Won	
Alliance of Women Film Journalists Awards	2013	Best Actress	Gravity	Nominated	
Alliance of Women Film Journalists Awards	2013	Female Icon of the Year	Gravity	Nominated	
American Comedy Awards	1996	Funniest Lead Actress in a Motion Picture	While You Were Sleeping	Nominated	
American Comedy Awards	2001	Funniest Lead Actress in a Motion Picture	Miss Congeniality	Won	
American Comedy Awards	2014	Comedy Actress – Film	The Heat	Nominated	
Awards Circuit Community Awards	2005	Best Cast Ensemble (Note: Shared with the cast)	Crash	Won	
Awards Circuit Community Awards	2009	Best Actress in a Leading Role	The Blind Side	Nominated	
Awards Circuit Community Awards	2013	Best Actress in a Leading Role	Gravity	Nominated	
Bambi Awards	2000	Best International Film Actress	28 Days	Won	
Blockbuster Entertainment Awards	1995	Favorite Actress – Action/Adventure/Thriller	Speed	Won	
Blockbuster Entertainment Awards	1996	Favorite Actress – Comedy (Note: Video award)	While You Were Sleeping	Won	
Blockbuster Entertainment Awards	1996	Favorite Actress – Comedy/Romance (Note: Theatrical award)	While You Were Sleeping	Won	
Blockbuster Entertainment Awards	1997	Favorite Actress – Suspense/Thriller	A Time to Kill	Won	
Blockbuster Entertainment Awards	2000	Favorite Actress – Comedy/Romance	Forces of Nature	Nominated	
Blockbuster Entertainment Awards	2001	Favorite Actress – Comedy	Miss Congeniality	Won	
Bravo Otto Awards	1995	Moviestar – Female	Speed	Gold	
Bravo Otto Awards	1996	Moviestar – Female	While You Were Sleeping	Gold	
Bravo Otto Awards	1997	Moviestar – Female	A Time to Kill	Silver	
Bravo Otto Awards	1998	Moviestar – Female	Speed 2: Cruise Control	Silver	
Bravo Otto Awards	2000	Moviestar – Female	Forces of Nature	Bronze	
Bravo Otto Awards	2001	Moviestar – Female	Miss Congeniality	Bronze	
British Academy Film Awards	2014	Best Actress in a Leading Role	Gravity	Nominated	
Chicago Film Critics Association Awards	1995	Most Promising Actress	Speed	Nominated	
Chicago Film Critics Association Awards	2013	Best Actress	Gravity	Nominated	
CinEuphoria Awards	2014	Actress – International Competition	Gravity	Nominated	
Costume Designers Guild Awards	2007	President's Award	—N/a	Won	
Critics' Choice Movie Awards	2006	Best Acting Ensemble	Crash	Won	
Critics' Choice Movie Awards	2010	Best Actress (Note: tied with Meryl Streep (in Julie & Julia))	The Blind Side	Won	
Critics' Choice Movie Awards	2014	Best Actress in an Action Movie	Gravity	Won	
Critics' Choice Movie Awards	2014	Best Actress	Gravity	Nominated	
Critics' Choice Movie Awards	2014	Best Actress in a Comedy	The Heat	Nominated	
Critics' Choice Super Awards	2023	Best Actress in an Action Movie	The Lost City	Nominated	
Dallas-Fort Worth Film Critics Association Awards	2009	Best Actress	The Blind Side	Nominated	
Dallas-Fort Worth Film Critics Association Awards	2013	Best Actress	Gravity	Nominated	
Denver Film Critics Society Awards	2010	Best Actress	The Blind Side	Nominated	
Denver Film Critics Society Awards	2014	Best Actress	Gravity	Nominated	
Dorian Awards	2014	Film Performance of the Year – Female	Gravity	Nominated	
Dublin Film Critics Circle Awards	2013	Best Actress (Note: tied with Rooney Mara (in Ain't Them Bodies Saints))	Gravity	6th place	
Empire Awards	2014	Best Actress	Gravity	Nominated	
Georgia Film Critics Association Awards	2012	Best Supporting Actress	Extremely Loud & Incredibly Close	Nominated	
Georgia Film Critics Association Awards	2014	Best Actress	Gravity	Nominated	
Golden Apple Awards	1995	Female Star of the Year	—N/a	Won	
Golden Globe Awards	1996	Best Actress – Motion Picture Musical or Comedy	While You Were Sleeping	Nominated	
Golden Globe Awards	2001	Best Actress – Motion Picture Musical or Comedy	Miss Congeniality	Nominated	
Golden Globe Awards	2010	Best Actress – Motion Picture Drama	The Blind Side	Won	
Golden Globe Awards	2010	Best Actress – Motion Picture Musical or Comedy	The Proposal	Nominated	
Golden Globe Awards	2014	Best Actress – Motion Picture Drama	Gravity	Nominated	
Golden Raspberry Awards	1994	Worst Supporting Actress	Demolition Man	Nominated	
Golden Raspberry Awards	1998	Worst Actress	Speed 2: Cruise Control	Nominated	
Golden Raspberry Awards	1998	Worst Screen Couple (Note: shared with Jason Patric)	Speed 2: Cruise Control	Nominated	
Golden Raspberry Awards	2010	Worst Actress	All About Steve	Won	
Golden Raspberry Awards	2010	Worst Screen Couple (Note: shared with Bradley Cooper)	All About Steve	Won	
Gotham Awards	2005	Best Ensemble Performance	Crash	Nominated	
Hasty Pudding Theatrical Awards	2004	Woman of the Year	—N/a	Won	
Hollywood Film Festival Awards	2005	Ensemble of the Year	Crash	Won	
Hollywood Film Festival Awards	2006	Supporting Actress of the Year	Infamous	Won	
Hollywood Film Festival Awards	2006	Supporting Actress of the Year	The Lake House	Won	
Hollywood Film Festival Awards	2013	Actress of the Year	Gravity	Won	
Houston Film Critics Society Awards	2009	Best Actress	The Blind Side	Nominated	
Houston Film Critics Society Awards	2013	Best Actress	Gravity	Won	
Indiewire Critics Poll Awards	2013	Best Lead Performance	Gravity	Nominated	
Iowa Film Critics Awards	2014	Best Actress	Gravity	Nominated	
Irish Film and Television Awards	2014	International Actress	Gravity	Nominated	
Joseph Plateau Awards	1999	Joseph Plateau Award of Honour	—N/a	Won	
Jupiter Awards	1994	Best International Actress	Speed	Won	
Jupiter Awards	1995	Best International Actress	While You Were Sleeping	Won	
Jupiter Awards	1996	Best International Actress	A Time to Kill	Won	
Jupiter Awards	1996	Best International Actress	The Net	Won	
Jupiter Awards	2014	Best International Actress	Gravity	Won	
Kansas City Film Critics Circle Awards	2013	Best Actress	Gravity	Won	
London Critics Circle Film Awards	2014	Actress of the Year	Gravity	Nominated	
Lone Star Film & Television Awards	1999	Best Actress	Hope Floats	Won	
Montreal World Film Festival Awards	1998	Career Excellence Award	—N/a	Won	
MTV Movie Awards	1995	Best Female Performance	Speed	Won	
MTV Movie Awards	1995	Best On-Screen Duo (Note: shared with Keanu Reeves)	Speed	Won	
MTV Movie Awards	1995	Most Desirable Female	Speed	Won	
MTV Movie Awards	1995	Best Kiss	Speed	Nominated	
MTV Movie Awards	1996	Best Female Performance	While You Were Sleeping	Nominated	
MTV Movie Awards	1996	Most Desirable Female	While You Were Sleeping	Nominated	
MTV Movie Awards	1997	Best Female Performance	A Time to Kill	Nominated	
MTV Movie Awards	2010	MTV Generation Award	—N/a	Won	
MTV Movie Awards	2010	Best Comedic Performance	The Proposal	Nominated	
MTV Movie Awards	2010	Best Female Performance	The Blind Side	Nominated	
MTV Movie Awards	2010	Best Kiss (Note: shared with Ryan Reynolds)	The Proposal	Nominated	
MTV Movie Awards	2014	Best Female Performance	Gravity	Nominated	
MTV Movie Awards	2019	Most Frightened Performance	Bird Box	Won	
MTV Movie Awards	2019	Best Performance in a Movie	Bird Box	Nominated	
MTV Movie Awards	2022	Best Performance in a Movie	The Lost City	Nominated	
MTV Movie Awards	2022	Best Team (Note: shared with Channing Tatum and Brad Pitt)	The Lost City	Nominated	
NAACP Image Awards	2010	Outstanding Actress in a Motion Picture	The Blind Side	Nominated	
Nickelodeon Kids' Choice Awards	1995	Favorite Movie Actress	Speed	Nominated	
Nickelodeon Kids' Choice Awards	2000	Favorite Movie Actress	Forces of Nature	Nominated	
Nickelodeon Kids' Choice Awards	2000	Favorite Movie Couple (Note: shared with Ben Affleck)	Forces of Nature	Nominated	
Nickelodeon Kids' Choice Awards	2010	Favorite Movie Actress	The Blind Side	Nominated	
Nickelodeon Kids' Choice Awards	2010	Favorite Movie Actress	The Proposal	Nominated	
Nickelodeon Kids' Choice Awards	2014	Favorite Female Butt Kicker	Gravity	Nominated	
Nickelodeon Kids' Choice Awards	2014	Favorite Movie Actress	Gravity	Nominated	
Nickelodeon Kids' Choice Awards	2016	Favorite Voice from an Animated Movie	Minions	Nominated	
North Carolina Film Critics Association Awards	2014	Best Actress	Gravity	Nominated	
North Texas Film Critics Association Awards	2014	Best Actress	Gravity	Won	
Online Film & Television Association Awards	1999	Best Cinematic Moment (Note: for "The Parting of the Red Sea" sequence)	The Prince of Egypt	Nominated	
Online Film & Television Association Awards	2010	Best Actress	The Blind Side	Nominated	
Online Film & Television Association Awards	2014	Best Actress	Gravity	Nominated	
Palm Springs International Film Festival Awards	2014	Desert Palm Achievement Award	Gravity	Won	
People's Choice Awards	1996	Favorite Motion Picture Actress	While You Were Sleeping	Won	
People's Choice Awards	1997	Favorite Motion Picture Actress	A Time to Kill	Won	
People's Choice Awards	1998	Favorite Motion Picture Actress	Speed 2: Cruise Control	Nominated	
People's Choice Awards	1999	Favorite Motion Picture Actress	Practical Magic	Won	
People's Choice Awards	2000	Favorite Motion Picture Actress	Forces of Nature	Nominated	
People's Choice Awards	2003	Favorite Motion Picture Actress	Two Weeks Notice	Nominated	
People's Choice Awards	2006	Favorite Female Movie Star	Miss Congeniality 2: Armed & Fabulous	Won	
People's Choice Awards	2007	Favorite Female Movie Star	The Lake House	Nominated	
People's Choice Awards	2008	Favorite Female Movie Star	Premonition	Nominated	
People's Choice Awards	2010	Favorite Movie Actress	The Proposal	Won	
People's Choice Awards	2010	Favorite On-Screen Team	The Proposal	Nominated	
People's Choice Awards	2013	Favorite Humanitarian	—N/a	Won	
People's Choice Awards	2014	Favorite Comedic Movie Actress	The Heat	Won	
People's Choice Awards	2014	Favorite Dramatic Movie Actress	Gravity	Won	
People's Choice Awards	2014	Favorite Movie Actress	Gravity	Won	
People's Choice Awards	2014	Favorite Movie Duo (Note: shared with George Clooney)^{/} (Note: shared with Melissa McCarthy)	Gravity	Won	
People's Choice Awards	2014	Favorite Movie Duo^{/}	The Heat	Nominated	
People's Choice Awards	2016	Favorite Movie Actress	Our Brand Is Crisis	Won	
People's Choice Awards	2016	Favorite Animated Movie Voice	Minions	Nominated	
People's Choice Awards	2018	Favorite Female Movie Star	Ocean's 8	Nominated	
People's Choice Awards	2022	The Comedy Movie Star of 2022	The Lost City	Nominated	
Phoenix Film Critics Society Awards	2013	Best Lead Actress	Gravity	Nominated	
Rembrandt Awards	2010	Best International Actress	The Proposal	Won	
Russian National Movie Awards	2014	Best Foreign Actress of the Year	Gravity	Nominated	
Russian National Movie Awards	2014	Best Foreign Actress of the Year	The Heat	Nominated	
San Diego Film Critics Society Awards	2009	Best Actress	The Blind Side	Nominated	
San Diego Film Critics Society Awards	2013	Best Actress	Gravity	Nominated	
San Francisco Film Critics Circle Awards	2013	Best Actress	Gravity	Nominated	
Santa Barbara International Film Festival Awards	2010	American Riviera Award	—N/a	Won	
Satellite Awards	2001	Best Actress in a Motion Picture - Comedy or Musical	Miss Congeniality	Nominated	
Satellite Awards	2009	Best Actress in a Motion Picture - Comedy or Musical	The Proposal	Nominated	
Satellite Awards	2013	Best Actress in a Motion Picture	Gravity	Nominated	
Saturn Awards	1995	Best Actress	Speed	Won	
Saturn Awards	2014	Best Actress	Gravity	Won	
Screen Actors Guild Awards	2006	Outstanding Performance by a Cast in a Motion Picture	Crash	Won	
Screen Actors Guild Awards	2010	Outstanding Performance by a Female Actor in a Leading Role	The Blind Side	Won	
Screen Actors Guild Awards	2014	Outstanding Performance by a Female Actor in a Leading Role	Gravity	Nominated	
Seattle Film Critics Society Awards	2014	Best Actress	Gravity	Nominated	
ShoWest Convention Awards	1996	Female Star of the Year	—N/a	Won	
ShoWest Convention Awards	2001	Female Star of the Year	—N/a	Won	
St. Louis Film Critics Association Awards	2013	Best Actress	Gravity	Nominated	
Teen Choice Awards	1999	Choice Movie – Hissy Fit	Forces of Nature	Won	
Teen Choice Awards	2001	Choice Movie – Wipeout	Miss Congeniality	Won	
Teen Choice Awards	2001	Choice Movie Actress	Miss Congeniality	Nominated	
Teen Choice Awards	2001	Choice Movie – Hissy Fit	Miss Congeniality	Nominated	
Teen Choice Awards	2002	Choice Movie Actress – Drama/Action-Adventure	Divine Secrets of the Ya-Ya Sisterhood	Nominated	
Teen Choice Awards	2003	Choice Movie Actress – Comedy	Two Weeks Notice	Nominated	
Teen Choice Awards	2003	Choice Movie – Hissy Fit	Two Weeks Notice	Nominated	
Teen Choice Awards	2005	Choice Movie Actress – Comedy	Miss Congeniality 2: Armed & Fabulous	Won	
Teen Choice Awards	2005	Choice Movie – Dance Sequence (Note: shared with Regina King)	Miss Congeniality 2: Armed & Fabulous	Nominated	
Teen Choice Awards	2006	Choice Movie – Liplock	The Lake House	Won	
Teen Choice Awards	2009	Choice Summer Movie Star – Female	The Proposal	Nominated	
Teen Choice Awards	2010	Choice Movie Actress – Romantic Comedy	The Proposal	Won	
Teen Choice Awards	2010	Choice Movie – Chemistry	The Proposal	Nominated	
Teen Choice Awards	2010	Choice Movie – Liplock	The Proposal	Nominated	
Teen Choice Awards	2010	Choice Movie – Dance (Note: shared with Betty White)	The Proposal	Won	
Teen Choice Awards	2010	Choice Movie Actress – Drama	The Blind Side	Won	
Teen Choice Awards	2012	Choice Movie Actress – Drama	Extremely Loud & Incredibly Close	Nominated	
Teen Choice Awards	2013	Choice Movie – Chemistry	The Heat	Won	
Teen Choice Awards	2013	Choice Summer Movie Star – Female	The Heat	Won	
Teen Choice Awards	2014	Choice Movie Actress – Drama	Gravity	Nominated	
Utah Film Critics Association Awards	2013	Best Actress	Gravity	Nominated	
Vancouver Film Critics Circle Awards	2014	Best Actress	Gravity	Nominated	
Virginia Film Festival Awards	2004	Virginia Film Award	—N/a	Won	
Washington DC Area Film Critics Association Awards	2009	Best Actress	The Blind Side	Nominated	
Washington DC Area Film Critics Association Awards	2013	Best Actress	Gravity	Nominated	
Women Film Critics Circle Awards	2013	Invisible Woman Award	Gravity	Won	
Women's Image Network Awards	2009	Outstanding Actress in a Feature Film	The Proposal	Won	
Women's Image Network Awards	2013	Outstanding Actress in a Feature Film	Gravity	Nominated	
Women in Film Crystal + Lucy Awards	2005	Crystal Award	—N/a	Won	

== Other miscellaneous awards ==
Name of the award ceremony, year presented, category, nominated work, and the result of the nomination
Award	Year	Category	Nominated work	Result	Ref.
All Def Movie Awards	2016	Most Helpful White Person	The Blind Side	Nominated	
Behind the Voice Actors Awards	2016	Best Female Lead Vocal Performance in a Feature Film	Minions	Nominated	
Golden Schmoes Awards	2013	Favorite Celebrity of the Year	—N/a	Nominated	
Golden Schmoes Awards	2013	Best Actress of the Year	Gravity	Won	
IGN Summer Movie Awards	2013	Best Movie Actress	Gravity	Nominated	
The Stinkers Bad Movie Awards	1998	Most Annoying Fake Accent – Female	Hope Floats	Nominated	
The Stinkers Bad Movie Awards	2005	Worst Actress	Miss Congeniality 2: Armed & Fabulous	Nominated	
The Stinkers Bad Movie Awards	2005	Less Than Dynamic Duo	Miss Congeniality 2: Armed & Fabulous	Nominated	
Village Voice Film Poll Awards	2013	Best Actress	Gravity	Nominated	
Yoga Awards	1996	Worst Foreign Actress	The Net	Won	
Yoga Awards	1996	Worst Foreign Actress	While You Were Sleeping	Won	
Yoga Awards	2004	Worst Foreign Actress	Two Weeks Notice	Won	
