= A Time for Mercy =

2020 legal thriller novel

- First edition cover
- Author: John Grisham
- Cover artist: Photograph by David Keochkerian/Trevillion Images; jacket design by John Fontana
- Language: English
- Genre: Legal thriller fiction
- Set in: Fictional Clanton, Mississippi, 1990
- Publisher: Doubleday
- Publication date: October 13, 2020
- Publication place: United States
- Media type: Print (hardback and large print paperback)/digital (audiobook and Kindle)
- Pages: 480
- ISBN: 978-0-385-54596-9
- Preceded by: Sycamore Row
- Website: https://www.jgrisham.com/books/a-time-for-mercy/

A Time for Mercy, a legal thriller novel by American author John Grisham, is the sequel to A Time to Kill (his first novel, published in 1989) and Sycamore Row (published in 2013). The latest book features the return of the character Jake Brigance, a small-town Mississippi lawyer who takes on difficult cases. The novel was released on October 13, 2020.

Once again, Brigance is the court-appointed lawyer who seeks truth and justice for his client, in this case a sixteen-year-old boy named Drew Gamble, who is charged with murdering a law enforcement officer and faces the death penalty. As Jake digs into the details of the case, he knows he has to find a way to save the boy, even at the risk of his career and his family's safety.

== Plot ==
In 1990, five years after successfully defending accused murderer Carl Lee Hailey, attorney Jake Brigance is assigned by Circuit Court Judge Omar Noose to the case of 16-year-old Drew Gamble, who has been accused of murder after killing Stuart Kofer, a deputy sheriff who was his mother Josie's boyfriend.

After Josie, along with her 14-year-old daughter Kiera and Drew, moved in with Kofer, the deputy subjected them to domestic abuse while drunk. Since Kofer performed well when he was sober and was well-liked by his fellow officers, no reports were filed and Sheriff Ozzie Walls was unaware of Kofer's behavior. On the night of the murder, Kofer knocked Josie unconscious while breaking her jaw. Assuming his mother was dead, Drew called 911 to report the situation before using Kofer's service pistol to shoot the deputy in the head.

Taking the case puts Jake at odds with most of the residents of Clanton, as well as the local law enforcement community, including his longtime friend Sheriff Ozzie Walls. He tries to convince Judge Noose to find another lawyer to defend Drew but to no avail. Meanwhile, Jake and his associate Harry Rex Vonner are working on a tort case against the Central and Southern Railroad. The case involves the death of a young family in a collision with a train at a poorly maintained crossing. Jake needs to win that case, also in Judge Noose's court, in order to pay the costs of defending Drew, as Josie is penniless and the government will only pay Jake a small stipend of $1,000.

With the assistance of his paralegal Portia Lang and his mentor Lucien Wilbanks, Jake puts together a case he hopes will sway at least some jurors to find Drew not guilty. The strategy is based on the fact that Kiera is pregnant after being sexually assaulted by Kofer. By concealing the pregnancy until the trial, the element of surprise does indeed have the desired effect, resulting in a hung jury and Drew's release on bail. Because Josie wants her daughter to avoid the problems she had faced as a young mother, she agrees to let Jake and his wife Carla adopt the baby, which they name Luke.

Meanwhile, Judge Noose orders Ford County to pay Jake in full for his time and expenses of defending Drew, a decision which is promptly appealed by the attorney for the county. In addition, Lucien suggests a way for Jake to get the railroad case moved to chancery court, where it can be tried without a jury and Judge Reuben Atlee will undoubtedly force the railroad into a settlement.

== Major themes ==
- Bible Belt attitudes towards abortion vs. adoption and capital punishment for underage defendants
- Domestic violence
- Sexual abuse
- Police code of silence
- Justifiable homicide
- Aspects of the U.S. Legal system: professional courtesy, play by the rules, justice prevails

== Background ==
A Time for Mercy is the sequel to A Time to Kill (Grisham's first novel, published in 1989) and Sycamore Row (published in 2013). The latest novel includes several characters from the previous books, in particular Jake Brigance, a small-town Mississippi lawyer. As in the first book, Brigance is stuck with a client whose understandable reasons for committing murder do not change the fact of his guilt. And, like in both of the earlier books, Brigance ends up with an unpopular defendant in a very divisive trial.

== Reception ==
Early reviewers had mixed reactions to A Time for Mercy. Sarah Lyall of The New York Times liked the leisurely pace of the suspenseful story and the character development but found aspects of the plot unsatisfying. Publishers Weekly described the book as disappointing and suitable only for diehard Grisham fans. Kirkus Reviews agreed that the book would please devotees of Grisham but noted that the ending was "oddly inconclusive."
