= Michael Collins (soundtrack) =

Soundtrack album by Elliot Goldenthal
- Released: October 1st, 1996
- Genre: Irish, classical, Avant-garde
- Length: 43:30
- Label: Atlantic; 82960
- Producer: Matthias Gohl

Elliot Goldenthal chronology
Heat (1995)	Michael Collins (1996)	A Time to Kill (1996)

Professional ratings
Review scores
Source	Rating
Allmusic	4/5 stars
Filmtracks	4/5 stars
Musicfromthemovies	5/5 stars

Elliot Goldenthal's score for the film was nominated for the Academy Award for Best Original Dramatic Score.

Sinéad O'Connor and Irish tenor Frank Patterson both contributed to the soundtrack.

== Track listing ==
1. "Easter Rebellion" (3:15) - Perf. by Sinéad O'Connor
2. "Fire and Arms" (1:40)
3. "Train Station Farewell" (1:55)
4. "Winter Raid" (2:37)
5. "Elegy for a Sunday" (3:07)
6. "Football Match" (1:49)
7. "On Cats Feet" (4:27)
8. "Defiance and Arrest" (1:49)
9. "Train to Granard" (1:30)
10. "Boland Returns (Kitty's Waltz)" (1:18)
11. "His Majesty's Finest" (2:11)
12. "Boland's Death" (1:38)
13. "Home to Cork" (1:19)
14. "Civil War" (2:10) - Perf. by Sinéad O'Connor
15. "Collins' Proposal" (1:25)
16. "An Anthem Deferred" (1:44)
17. "She Moved Through the Fair" (4:55) - Perf. by Sinéad O'Connor
18. "Funeral/Coda" (4:32)
19. "Macushla" (3'29) - Perf. by Frank Patterson

== Crew/Credit ==
- Music Composed by Elliot Goldenthal (except 1,14,17 & 19)
- Music Produced by Matthias Gohl
- Orchestrated by Robert Elhai and Elliot Goldenthal
- Conducted by Jonathan Sheffer
- Recorded and Mixed by Joel Iwataki and Steve McLaughlin
- Electronic Music Produced by Richard Martinez
- Choir Conducted by Rick Cordova
