= Fredric Lebow =

American screenwriter

- Education: Hofstra University (BA); New York University (MFA)

Fredric Lebow is an American screenwriter. He co-wrote the screenplay for While You Were Sleeping (1995) with Daniel G. Sullivan, but while it was acclaimed by many it did not receive any awards. He also had a minor role in the 1991 B-movie Chopper Chicks in Zombietown. He currently resides in Long Island, New York.

== Education ==
Lebow has a masters in film from New York University (His LinkedIn page says it was a MFA in Dramatic Writing in 1983). He received his BA in Political Science from Hofstra University in 1978. He is a 1974 graduate of Lawrence High School.
