= Sycamore Row =

Legal thriller novel by John Grisham

- First edition (US)
- Author: John Grisham
- Language: English
- Genre: Legal thriller
- Publisher: Doubleday (US); Hodder & Stoughton (UK)
- Publication date: October 22, 2013
- Publication place: United States
- Pages: 464 pp (hardcover 1st edition)
- ISBN: 978-0385537131 (hardcover 1st edition)
- Preceded by: A Time to Kill
- Followed by: A Time for Mercy

Sycamore Row is a legal thriller novel by American author John Grisham published by Doubleday on October 22, 2013. The novel reached the top spot in the US best-seller list. It is preceded by A Time to Kill and followed by A Time for Mercy.

== Plot ==
The story begins three years after the sensational events in the trial of Carl Lee Hailey (A Time to Kill). An employee of wealthy recluse Seth Hubbard is instructed to meet his boss at a location by these sycamores one early Sunday afternoon. The employee finds Mr. Hubbard has hanged himself from the tree because his terminal lung cancer had become too painful. Accompanying the body are very specific funeral and burial instructions.

Jake Brigance, Carl Lee's former attorney, receives a letter sent by Hubbard just before he killed himself, containing a new holographic will that renounces a will he filed the year before in which he leaves all his assets to his daughter and son as well as his grandchildren. In this new will, Hubbard stipulates that his children will receive nothing. Instead, five percent will be given to the local church and another five percent will be left to his long-disappeared brother, Ancil Hubbard. The remaining ninety percent is to be given to his black housekeeper Letitia "Lettie" Lang. Further instructions stipulate that the will must not be filed for probate until after Hubbard's funeral so that his children, who rarely visited him during his bout with cancer, can put on a show not knowing that they will ultimately be left with nothing.

Hubbard notes that his children will certainly contest the new will because they are greedy and that Jake must do whatever it takes to make sure the new will is enforced. He says he chose Jake because of the admirable work that Jake did during the Hailey trial.

Soon, Jake finds out that Hubbard had earned more than $20 million in a lumber yard business, a fortune unmatched by any other individual in Ford County. As the executor publishes this sum, the entire town of Clanton shifts their attention to the case.

Hubbard's children attempt to contest their father's new will by claiming he was not capable when filing it, igniting a hotly contested court battle with many twists and turns. At first the trial goes well until the opposing lawyer manages to spring a surprise witness, whose testimony seems to show that Lettie had tried to influence an earlier ailing employer to leave her money in a will, creating a suspicion of her systematically preying on the weakness of elderly ailing people. Still another surprise witness, a former black female employee with whom Hubbard had sexual relations comes forward, implying that Lettie had also slept with Hubbard.

At the last moment, the trial is changed again by a sensational deposition given by Hubbard's long-lost brother Ancil. Ancil had left Ford County and joined the U.S. Navy at the age of 17, vowing never to return. Since then, he had led an adventurous and often criminal life until finally being located as a bartender in Juneau, Alaska, where Lucien, Jake's friend and ex-partner, managed to obtain his testimony. Ancil explains why Seth left the money to Lettie.

In the 1920s, Lettie's grandfather Sylvester, whom she never knew, owned a considerable plot of land. His being a landowner was very much a rarity for a black person in the segregationist Deep South, and was greatly resented by racist whites in general and in particular by his neighbor, Cleon Hubbard, who laid a claim to Sylvester's land. Hubbard, an abusive man who was often violent toward his wife and two sons, Seth and Ancil, tried to go to court but was unsuccessful.

Having failed in court, Hubbard resorted to the alternative method available at the time to whites in the Deep South, i.e. lynch law. Sylvester was falsely accused of "speaking rudely to white women", which, together with resentment at his being a black landowner, was enough to mobilize a lynch mob. Several men dragged Sylvester from his home and hanged him from a sycamore tree. His sons, Ancil and Seth, who did not share their father's prejudice and sometimes played with the black children, secretly observed this scene with great horror. Subsequently, Cleon Hubbard intimidated Esther, Lettie's grandmother, and forced her to sign away the family's ownership for a pittance – with a promise that she could continue residing on the property. However, the promise was promptly broken, and Cleon and the sheriff then expelled the entire extended family and set fire to their homes and small chapel, totally eradicating the small black community which had been known as "Sycamore Row". Esther, along with her five-year-old daughter (who would become Lettie's mother), had to escape with virtually no possessions. An older child, with whom the Hubbard boys sometimes played, drowned in a river during the final expulsion.

Years later, Seth Hubbard used the property gained by his father as collateral for a mortgage in order to build his lumber yard. Knowing that his success was partly owed to this mortgage and wanting to make up for the injustice caused by his father, he decided to give the majority of his capital to Lettie and in a final act hanged himself from the same tree from which Lettie's grandfather was hanged.

After hearing Ancil Hubbard's testimony, the jury unanimously upholds the will and rejects the claims against its validity by Hubbard's children. However, an appeal seems very probable, which might last for years and consume a large part of the estate in legal fees. Moreover, the judge's decision to let the jury hear Ancil Hubbard's testimony might be challenged on procedural grounds (it was a recorded testimony and opposing counsel could not cross-examine him). Therefore, Judge Reuben Atlee suggests the parties settle the case with reasonable conditions. As the judge suggests, after Ancil Hubbard and the local church get their promised share, $5 million would be given to a fund providing college education to members of Lettie's family, all of whom share in the terrible legacy of the 1930 lynching and expulsion. Such a fund would also help Lettie get off her back numerous relatives who had shown up since the news spread that she would become rich. Jake would be in charge of this fund, giving him steady employment but also a lot of headaches. The remaining $6 million would be divided equally between Lettie and Seth Hubbard's children.

The compromise is acceptable to everybody. Lettie is content to get back the land which belonged to her grandfather and build on it a nice house for herself, her children and grandchildren and does not mind Seth Hubbard's children getting at least some of his money. In the final scene, Ancil Hubbard arrives from Alaska and has an emotional meeting with Lettie and other protagonists under the sycamore tree, she asking him to let the past lie and look to a better future.

== Reception ==
According to USA Today, "Jake Brigance returns to the courtroom in a 'dramatic showdown as Ford County again confronts its tortured history.'"
