= Making Sandwiches =

1998 film by Sandra Bullock

- Directed by: Sandra Bullock
- Written by: Sandra Bullock
- Produced by: Sandra Bullock; Pamela Westmore
- Starring: Sandra Bullock; Matthew McConaughey; Eric Roberts; Beth Grant
- Cinematography: Dan Winters
- Edited by: Mark S. Westmore
- Music by: Richard Ziegler
- Production company: Fortis Films
- Release date: 1998
- Running time: 30 minutes
- Country: United States
- Language: English

Making Sandwiches is a short film written and directed by American actress and producer Sandra Bullock.

== Cast ==
- Sandra Bullock as Melba Club
- Matthew McConaughey as Bud Hoagie
- Eric Roberts as Julia
- Beth Grant as Mrs. Hellman

== Production ==
The short film was shot in Ventura, California in 1996, and debuted at the 1997 Sundance Film Festival, and also played the Austin Film Festival in 1998.
