= Hangmen (film) =

1987 film by John Christian Ingvordsen

- Directed by: J. Christian Ingvordsen
- Written by: J. Christian Ingvordsen; Steven Kaman; Rick Washburn
- Produced by: J. Christian Ingvordsen
- Starring: Rick Washburn; Keith Bogart; Sandra Bullock
- Cinematography: Steven Kaman
- Edited by: Steven Kaman
- Music by: Michael Montes
- Production company: Cinema Sciences Corporation
- Distributed by: Shapiro Entertainment
- Release date: May 1987 (Cannes Film Festival)
- Running time: 90 minutes
- Country: United States
- Language: English

Hangmen is a 1987 American action thriller film written and directed by J. Christian Ingvordsen, and marked the acting debut of actress Sandra Bullock.

== Plot ==
The security agent of a US senator, Dick Biel, is responsible for responding to an assassination attempt. He accidentally kills several innocent bystanders with the team, during the operation.

Several years later, Rob Greene becomes the leader of the secret operations team that had been charged with protecting the senator, having information about a renegade CIA cell and that cell wants Greene and his information. He runs from the cell, so they attempt to kidnap Danny, Rob's estranged son as a hostage. In the process, they murder Danny's best friend, two of Rob Greene’s former team, Rob’s ex-wife and her new husband. The rest of the team get together to fight back, including the team member responsible for the deaths of bystanders years before. When the CIA cell kidnaps Lisa, Danny’s girlfriend, they are able to manipulate Danny into surrendering to them. Rob’s team then attacks the headquarters of the CIA cell in a rescue mission.

== Trivia ==
Bullock is featured on the covers of later video releases as the headline star, capitalizing on her later stardom.

== Cast ==
- Rick Washburn as Rob Greene
- Doug Thomas as Dog Thompson
- Keith Bogart as Danny Greene
- "John Christian" (J. Christian Ingvordsen) as Bone Conn
- Sandra Bullock as Lisa Edwards
- David Henry Keller as Andrews
- Dan Lutsky as Joe Connelly
- "Sam Silver" (Dan Golden) as Reynolds
- Robert Khaleel as Draff
- Jake LaMotta as Moe Boone
- Kosmo Vinyl as Kosmo
- Stu Day as Keeper
- Dick Mel as Senator Dick Biel
- Amanda Zinsser as Caroline Fosterian
