= While You Were Sleeping (film) =

1995 film by Jon Turteltaub

- Theatrical release poster
- Directed by: Jon Turteltaub
- Written by: Daniel G. Sullivan; Fredric Lebow
- Produced by: Joe Roth; Roger Birnbaum
- Starring: Sandra Bullock; Bill Pullman; Peter Gallagher; Peter Boyle; Glynis Johns; Jack Warden
- Cinematography: Phedon Papamichael
- Edited by: Bruce Green
- Music by: Randy Edelman
- Production companies: Hollywood Pictures; Caravan Pictures
- Distributed by: Buena Vista Pictures Distribution, Inc.
- Release date: April 21, 1995
- Running time: 103 minutes
- Country: United States
- Language: English
- Budget: $17 million
- Box office: $182 million

While You Were Sleeping is a 1995 American romantic comedy film directed by Jon Turteltaub and written by Daniel G. Sullivan and Fredric Lebow. It stars Sandra Bullock as Lucy, a Chicago Transit Authority token collector, and Bill Pullman as Jack, the brother of a man whose life she saves. Other major cast members include Peter Gallagher as Peter, the man who is saved; Peter Boyle and Glynis Johns as members of Peter's family; and Jack Warden as a long-time family friend and neighbor.

While You Were Sleeping was released by Buena Vista Pictures Distribution, Inc. on April 21, 1995. The film was a critical and commercial success, grossing over $182 million worldwide. Bullock and Pullman received praise for their performances. Bullock also garnered a nomination for the Golden Globe Award for Best Actress – Motion Picture Comedy or Musical.

== Plot ==
Fare token collector Lucy Moderatz works for the Chicago Transit Authority at the Randolph/Wabash station. She is secretly infatuated with regular commuter Peter Callaghan, though they are strangers. On Christmas Day, Lucy rescues Peter after muggers push him onto the train tracks. She accompanies the unconscious Peter to the hospital where she is mistaken for his fiancée.

Peter's family is surprised to hear he is "engaged", but grateful to Lucy for saving him. Too enthralled by the situation to reveal the truth, Lucy remains silent, emotionally captivated by the quirky Callaghans and their unconditional love. She is also concerned about upsetting Peter's grandmother, Elsie, who has a heart condition. While visiting the comatose Peter, Lucy confesses her predicament to him, unaware that his godfather, Saul, overhears. Saul leaves without confronting her. Meanwhile, at Peter's apartment to feed his cat, Lucy hears a message on his answering machine from his girlfriend, Ashley, saying she has decided to accept his proposal after all.

Spending a belated Christmas with the Callaghans, Lucy meets Peter's younger brother Jack. Expected to take over his father's estate furniture business, Jack wants to build and sell his own furniture. When Saul confronts Lucy about the lies, she confesses her loneliness; her mother died when she was very young and her father died the year before. Saul decides to keep her secret, since the accident has brought the family closer and Lucy is not malicious.

As Lucy and Jack spend time together, they begin to fall in love. Jack confesses to his unconscious brother that, for the first time, he is envious of something Peter has. Meanwhile, Ashley leaves follow-up messages, saying she is back in town and wants to see him. Due to a misunderstanding, Jack believes Lucy is pregnant. Upset, Jack confronts her about the "pregnancy" during Lucy's friend's New Year's Eve party, leading to a disagreement.

After New Year's Eve, Peter awakens. When he does not recognize Lucy, everyone assumes he has amnesia. Lucy attempts to tell the Callaghans the truth, but they presume she is telling them she is not actually pregnant and brush it off. Saul intercepts Lucy, saying he will explain the truth to them later. When Jack drives Lucy home, she tells him things will be different now that Peter is awake. Lucy thanks Jack for being a good friend, and he apologizes for the earlier argument. They share a heartfelt goodbye. The next day, Jack finally tells his father he would rather make furniture than take over the business.

Withholding the truth, Saul chastises Peter for how he treats women and affirms that Lucy is special; he encourages Peter to get to know her. When Lucy visits, Peter is charmed. Meanwhile, Ashley discovers from Peter's doorman that he is engaged to someone else and in the hospital. Ashley confronts Peter at the hospital, insisting they are engaged, but he reminds her they broke up after she rejected his proposal. Peter declares he is a changed man and is going to marry Lucy.

When Lucy discovers Saul never told the Callaghans the truth, she returns to the hospital to tell Peter herself. Before she can, Peter proposes "again"; Lucy accepts. Jack then visits her and gifts her a snow globe. Conflicted, Lucy asks if he can give her a reason not to marry Peter; he disappoints her, saying he cannot.

At the wedding ceremony, set for the next day, Lucy blurts out "I object," and Jack agrees. Confessing everything, Lucy admits she loves Jack. She tells the family she fell in love with them all, describing how happy she was to no longer be alone. Ashley arrives, demanding the wedding be stopped, followed by Ashley's husband who also objects. As everyone argues, Lucy slips out unnoticed.

Some time later, while Lucy is at work, Jack places an engagement ring in her booth's token tray. He proposes to her in the booth, with most of the Callaghans watching. Lucy and Jack marry and take a CTA train for their honeymoon. He fulfills her dream of going to Florence, Italy. Peter asks when she fell in love with Jack, and she replies, "It was while you were sleeping."

== Cast ==
- Sandra Bullock as Lucy Eleanor Moderatz, a lonely transportation worker
- Bill Pullman as Jack Callaghan, a carpenter with scruffy charm
- Peter Gallagher as Peter Callaghan, who is rich, handsome, and mostly gullible
- Peter Boyle as Ox Callaghan, the head of the Callaghan furniture business who often makes wisecracks
- Glynis Johns as Elsie, the slightly deluded grandmother
- Micole Mercurio as Midge Callaghan, an extremely passionate and kindhearted mother
- Jack Warden as Saul Tuttle, Peter's godfather and neighbor to the Callaghans
- Jason Bernard as Jerry Wallace, Lucy's dry-humored boss
- Michael Rispoli as Joe Fusco Jr., Lucy's troublesome yet harmless neighbor who has unrequited feelings for her
- Ally Walker as Ashley Bartlett Bacon, the snarky and superficial real fiancée of Peter
- Monica Keena as Mary Callaghan, the sweet younger sister of Peter and Jack

== Production ==
Both Demi Moore and Julia Roberts were offered the role of Lucy Moderatz but turned it down.

After Disney's Hollywood Pictures acquired the script in 1994, it struggled to find interested actors. Meg Ryan was one of the first to turn down the role, as Lucy was initially meant to be the one who falls into a coma.

Though the original screenplay was entitled Coma Guy, the title was changed shortly after the script was acquired by Caravan Pictures. The original script was set in New York City, but for budget reasons, the setting was changed to Chicago where it was shot on location. Filming took place from October 8 to December 14, 1994.

Bill Pullman reportedly tried to quit the film after an infamous table read that producer John Glickman called "the worst table read of all time", but was told by his agent he could not quit another film.

== Reception ==
=== Box office ===
The film grossed a total of $182,057,016 worldwide against an estimated $17,000,000 budget. It made $9,288,915 on its opening weekend of April 21–23, 1995, beating Bad Boys. It was the thirteenth highest-grossing film of 1995 in the United States.

=== Critical response ===
On Rotten Tomatoes, the film has an approval rating of 81% based on 62 reviews with an average rating of 6.50/10. The site's critical consensus states, "While You Were Sleeping is built wholly from familiar ingredients, but assembled with such skill – and with such a charming performance from Sandra Bullock – that it gives formula a good name." On Metacritic, the film has a weighted average score of 67 out of 100, based on reviews from 20 critics. Audiences surveyed by CinemaScore gave the film a grade A on scale of A to F.

Roger Ebert of the Chicago Sun-Times gave the film 3 stars out of 4, writing: "It's a feel-good film, warm and good-hearted, and as it was heading for its happy ending, I was still a little astonished how much I was enjoying it."

== Accolades ==
Bullock was nominated for the Golden Globe Award for Best Actress – Motion Picture Comedy or Musical. The film was recognized by the American Film Institute in 2002 with a nomination for the list AFI's 100 Years...100 Passions. Bullock was also nominated for Best Female Performance and Most Desirable Female at the 1996 MTV Movie Awards.
