= A Time to Kill (Grisham novel) =

Legal thriller novel by John Grisham

- First edition's cover
- Author: John Grisham
- Language: English
- Genre: Legal thriller
- Publisher: Wynwood Press
- Publication date: 1989
- Publication place: United States
- Media type: Print (Hardcover, Paperback)
- Pages: 672 pp
- ISBN: 9780922066032
- OCLC: 26089618
- Followed by: Sycamore Row

A Time to Kill is a 1989 legal thriller and debut novel by American author John Grisham. The novel was rejected by many publishers before Wynwood Press eventually gave it a 5,000-copy printing. When Doubleday published The Firm, Wynwood released a trade paperback of A Time to Kill, which became a bestseller.

Dell published the mass market paperback months after the success of The Firm, bringing Grisham to widespread popularity among readers. Doubleday eventually took over the contract for A Time to Kill and released a special hardcover edition.

== Setting ==
The story takes place in Clanton, a town in fictional Ford County, Mississippi during the post-Jim Crow era. Grisham would later use Ford County as a setting for several other novels. A passage in The Chamber reveals that the events of A Time to Kill took place in 1984.

Three of the characters - Jake Brigance, Harry Rex Vonner, and Lucien Wilbanks - later appear in two sequel novels, 2013's Sycamore Row and 2020's A Time for Mercy. Vonner and Wilbanks also appear in Grisham's 2003 novel The Last Juror, set in Clanton in the 1970s and Vonner is also featured in the 2002 novel, The Summons, and in the short story "Fish Files", in the 2009 collection Ford County.

== Inspiration ==
Grisham has described the book as "very autobiographical" in that the novel's "young attorney is basically me" and the drama is based on a case he witnessed. In 1984, Grisham witnessed the harrowing testimony of a 12-year-old rape victim at the DeSoto County courthouse in Hernando, Mississippi. Two sisters, Julie Scott, 16 years old, and Marcie Scott, 12 years old, had both been raped, brutally beaten, and nearly murdered by Willie James Harris. Unlike Grisham's depiction, however, the Scotts were white and their assailant was black.

According to Grisham's official website, Grisham used his spare time to begin his first novel, which "explored what would have happened if the girl's father had murdered her assailants." He spent three years on A Time to Kill and finished it in 1987. Grisham was a member of the Mississippi House of Representatives when he wrote the book, and much of it was written while he was staying at the Sun-n-Sand Motor Hotel in Jackson, Mississippi, a popular lodging establishment for state legislators.

Grisham has also cited Harper Lee's To Kill a Mockingbird, which centered around a black man being defended in court by a white attorney, as an influence on A Time to Kill. Another stated inspiration was 1987's Presumed Innocent, the success of which fed the growing subgenre of legal thrillers.

== Plot ==
In the small town of Clanton, in fictional Ford County, Mississippi, a ten-year-old African-American girl named Tonya Hailey is violently raped by two neo-Confederates, James "Pete" Willard and Billy Ray Cobb, shortly after stealing a Confederate Flag from a college student. Tonya is later found and rushed to the hospital while Pete and Billy Ray are heard bragging at a roadside bar about their crime. Tonya's outraged father, Carl Lee Hailey, consults his friend Jake Brigance, a white attorney who had previously represented Hailey's brother, on whether he could get himself acquitted if he killed the two men. Jake tells Carl Lee not to do anything stupid, but admits that if it had been his daughter, he would kill the rapists. Carl Lee is determined to avenge Tonya, and while Pete and Billy Ray are being led into holding after their bond hearing, he guns them both down with an M16 rifle.

Carl Lee is charged with capital murder. Despite efforts to persuade Carl Lee to retain high-powered attorneys, he elects to be represented by Jake. Helping Jake are two loyal friends, disbarred attorney and mentor Lucien Wilbanks, and sleazy divorce lawyer Harry Rex Vonner. Later, the team is assisted by liberal law student Ellen Roark, who has prior experience with death penalty cases and offers her services as a temporary clerk pro bono. Ellen appears to be interested in Jake romantically, but the married Jake resists her overtures. The team also receives some illicit behind-the-scenes help from black county sheriff Ozzie Walls, a figure beloved by the black community and also well respected by the white community who upholds the law by arresting Carl Lee but, as the father of two daughters of his own, privately supports Carl Lee and gives him special treatment while in jail and goes out of the way to assist Jake in any way he legally can. Carl Lee is prosecuted by Ford County's district attorney, Rufus Buckley, who hopes that the case will boost his political career. It is claimed that the judge presiding over Carl Lee's trial, Omar "Ichabod" Noose, has been intimidated by local white supremacist element--a fact given further credence when, despite having no history of racist inclinations in his rulings, Noose refuses Jake's request for a change of venue, even though the racial make-up of Ford County virtually guarantees an all-white jury, which later becomes the case.

Billy Ray's brother, Freddy, seeks revenge against Carl Lee, enlisting the help of the Mississippi branch of the Ku Klux Klan and its Grand Dragon, Stump Sisson. Subsequently, the KKK attempts to plant a bomb beneath Jake's porch, leading him to send his wife and daughter out of town until the trial is over. Later, the KKK attacks Jake's secretary, Ethel Twitty, and kills her frail husband, Bud. They also burn crosses in the yards of potential jurors to intimidate them. On the day the trial begins, a riot erupts between the KKK and the area's black residents outside the courthouse; Stump is killed by a Molotov cocktail. Believing that the black people are at fault for Stump's death, the KKK increase their attacks. As a result, the National Guard is called to Clanton to keep the peace during Carl Lee's trial. The KKK shoots at Jake one morning as he is being escorted into the courthouse, missing Jake but seriously wounding one of the guardsmen assigned to protect him. Soon after, Ellen Roark is abducted and nearly killed. They burn down Jake's house. During trial deliberations, the jury's spokesman is threatened by a KKK member with a knife. Eventually, they torture and murder "Mickey Mouse", one of Jake's former clients who had infiltrated the KKK and subsequently gave anonymous tips to the police, allowing them to anticipate most KKK attacks.

Despite the loss of his house and several setbacks at the start of the trial, Jake perseveres. He badly discredits the state's psychiatrist by establishing that he has never conceded to the insanity of any defendant in any criminal case in which he has been asked to testify, even when several other doctors have been in consensus otherwise. He traps the doctor with a revelation that several previous defendants found insane in their trials are currently under his care despite his having testified to their "sanity" in their respective trials, at which point the flustered doctor blurts out "You just can't trust juries,"--thus alienating the jury he was testifying to. Jake follows this up with a captivating closing statement, ignoring Lucien's advice to use a pre-prepared statement he had written.

On the day of the verdict, tens of thousands of black citizens gather in town and demand Carl Lee's acquittal. The unanimous acquittal by reason of temporary insanity is only achieved when one of the jurors asks the others to seriously imagine that Carl Lee and his daughter were white and that the murdered rapists were black, and polling the jury by secret ballot on the question of whether they would kill the rapists in such a case. After finding this question to be answered with a unanimous "yes," the jury finally acknowledges that they must hold a black father to the same, equal standard of justice and mercy. Carl Lee returns to his family and the story ends with Jake, Lucien and Harry Rex having a celebratory drink before Jake holds a press conference and leaves town to reunite with his family.

== Adaptations ==
- Joel Schumacher's film A Time to Kill (1996), starring Samuel L. Jackson and Matthew McConaughey, is based on this novel.
- Rupert Holmes wrote a stage adaptation of the novel, which was directed by Ethan McSweeny, and presented by Daryl Roth & Arena Stage at the Arena Stage in Washington, D.C., in 2011. The production transferred to Broadway and ran at the Golden Theatre from September 28 to November 17, 2013, where the cast featured Tom Skerritt, Patrick Page, Sebastian Arcelus, and Tonya Pinkins.

== Sequels ==
Two sequel novels involving the same characters and setting have been published. The first, titled Sycamore Row, was published on October 22, 2013, and the second, A Time for Mercy, was published in October 2020.
