= A Time to Kill (1996 film) =

1996 film by Joel Schumacher

- Theatrical release poster
- Directed by: Joel Schumacher
- Screenplay by: Akiva Goldsman
- Based on: A Time to Kill; 1989 novel by John Grisham
- Produced by: Arnon Milchan; John Grisham; Michael Nathanson; Hunt Lowry
- Starring: Sandra Bullock; Samuel L. Jackson; Matthew McConaughey; Kevin Spacey; Brenda Fricker; Oliver Platt; Charles S. Dutton; Ashley Judd; Patrick McGoohan; Donald Sutherland
- Cinematography: Peter Menzies Jr.
- Edited by: William Steinkamp
- Music by: Elliot Goldenthal
- Production company: Regency Enterprises
- Distributed by: Warner Bros.
- Release date: July 24, 1996
- Running time: 149 minutes
- Country: United States
- Language: English
- Budget: $40 million
- Box office: $152.3 million

A Time to Kill is a 1996 American Southern Gothic legal drama film based on John Grisham's 1989 novel of the same name. Sandra Bullock, Samuel L. Jackson, Matthew McConaughey, and Kevin Spacey star, with Donald and Kiefer Sutherland appearing in supporting roles and Octavia Spencer in her film debut.

A Time to Kill was released by Warner Bros. on July 24, 1996. The film received mixed reviews but was a commercial success, making $152 million worldwide. It is the second of two films based on Grisham's novels directed by Joel Schumacher, with the other being The Client released two years prior. It marked the final film appearance of Joe Seneca.

== Plot ==
In 1984 in Clanton, Mississippi, ten-year-old African-American girl Tonya Hailey is abducted, raped, and beaten by two local White Supremacist pedophiles, Billy Ray Cobb and Pete Willard, while on her way home from getting groceries. The duo dump her in a nearby river after a failed attempt to hang her. Tonya survives, and Sheriff Ozzie Walls arrests Cobb and Willard.

Tonya's father, Carl Lee Hailey, contacts Jake Brigance, a white lawyer who previously defended his brother Lester. Jake admits the possibility that the rapists will walk free, so Carl Lee goes to the county courthouse and opens fire with an automatic rifle, killing both rapists and unintentionally wounding Deputy Dwayne Looney, whose leg has to be amputated. Carl Lee is arrested, and Jake agrees to defend him.

As the rape and subsequent revenge killing gain national media attention, DA Rufus Buckley decides to take the case in hopes of furthering his political career. He seeks the death penalty, and presiding Judge Omar Noose denies Brigance a change of venue to a more ethnically diverse county, resulting in Lee likely facing an all-white jury.

Jake seeks help from his defense team: law student Ellen Roark, close friend Harry Rex Vonner, and former mentor and longtime activist Lucien Wilbanks, a once-great civil rights lawyer. Meanwhile, Billy Ray's brother Freddie Lee Cobb plans to avenge Billy's death by joining and enlisting the help of the Mississippi branch of the Ku Klux Klan and its Grand Dragon, Stump Sisson, to ensure Carl Lee's conviction and death sentence by any means necessary.

On the first day of the trial, the Klan takes to the streets and rallies, only to be outnumbered by counter-protesters consisting of the area's minority residents as well as white locals who support Carl Lee's acquittal. The protest erupts into a violent brawl that results in dozens of injuries and Sisson's death.

The Klan also begins to target Jake, assaulting his elderly secretary and her husband, the latter of whom dies of a heart attack brought on by the assault. They also burn a cross on his lawn and threaten his wife and daughter, which forces him to send them away during the trial. When Jake refuses to back down, the Klan then increases their attacks, including kidnapping and assaulting Ellen and burning Jake's house down.

Jake is able to discredit the state's psychiatrist, Dr. Wilbert Rodeheaver. However, then Buckley discredits Jake's psychiatrist, Dr. Willard Tyrell Bass, by revealing his prior conviction of statutory rape. Dispirited, Jake tells Carl Lee that there is little hope for an acquittal and tries to persuade him to take a plea deal that will imprison him for life but spare him execution.

Carl Lee refuses the deal, replying that he had chosen Jake as an attorney because as a white man he has insight into how the jury sees Carl Lee. During closing arguments, a deeply shaken Jake tells the jury to close their eyes and listen as he describes the entire ordeal of Tonya, to which some of the jurors shed tears. In his final comment, Jake asks them to imagine how they would feel "if she were white".

After deliberation, the jury finds Carl Lee not guilty of all charges. Jubilation ensues among the supporters while the Klan becomes enraged over their defeat. Meanwhile, Sheriff Walls arrests Freddie Lee for his crimes, as well as a corrupt deputy who is also revealed to be a Klansman. Sometime later, Jake brings his wife and daughter to a family cookout at Carl Lee's house to celebrate his freedom, challenging Carl Lee's previous statement that their children would never play together.

== Cast ==
- Samuel L. Jackson as Carl Lee Hailey
- Sandra Bullock as Ellen Roark
- Matthew McConaughey as Jake Brigance
- Kevin Spacey as Rufus Buckley
- Oliver Platt as Harry Rex Vonner
- Charles S. Dutton as Sheriff Ozzie Walls
- Brenda Fricker as Ethel Twitty
- Donald Sutherland as Lucien Wilbanks
- Beth Grant as Cora Mae Cobb
- Kiefer Sutherland as Freddie Lee Cobb
- Patrick McGoohan as Judge Omar Noose
- Ashley Judd as Carla Brigance
- Tonea Stewart as Gwen Hailey
- Rae'Ven Larrymore Kelly as Tonya Hailey
- John Diehl as Tim "Mickey Mouse" Nunley
- Chris Cooper as Deputy Sheriff Dwayne Looney
- Nicky Katt as Billy Ray Cobb
- Doug Hutchison as James Louis "Pete" Willard
- Kurtwood Smith as Stump Sisson
- Anthony Heald as Dr. Wilbert Rodeheaver
- M. Emmet Walsh as Dr. Willard Tyrell Bass
- Thomas Merdis as Reverend Ollie Agee
- Joe Seneca as Reverend Isaiah Street
- Jonathan Hadary as Norman Reinfield
- Mike Pniewski as Deputy Tatum
- David U. Hodges as Bailiff
- Randall Ponder as Courtroom Section Leader
- Octavia Spencer as Nurse Annette

== Production ==
The film was mainly produced in and around Canton, Mississippi, using a soundstage built specifically for the production in the city's industrial park. Most location filming took place around the Madison County Courthouse and former county jail on the courthouse grounds. Other location filming took place in the Jackson, Mississippi metro area, including the Jackson-Evers International Airport and Hinds County Medical Center (now Merit Health Central).

John Grisham did not want to sell the film rights to the book; he sold the rights for a record $6 million. He received casting approval for the film and overruled Joel Schumacher's choice of Woody Harrelson as the lead role, which was based on Grisham himself regarding Harrelson's participation in Natural Born Killers, which inspired a copycat crime that resulted in the death of one of Grisham's closest friends. Val Kilmer was also an early contender for the role. Sandra Bullock also received $6 million for five weeks of work.

Decades later, Samuel L. Jackson was highly critical of the film's editorial decisions, claiming big, emotional scenes for his character were removed, which "kept me from getting an Oscar."

== Reception ==
=== Box office ===
A Time to Kill was released in the United States on July 24, 1996. It reached number one during its first two weeks and grossed over $108 million domestically.

=== Critical reception ===
On Rotten Tomatoes, the film has an approval rating of 70% based on 53 reviews, with an average rating of 6.2/10. The critics' consensus reads: "Overlong and superficial, A Time to Kill nonetheless succeeds on the strength of its skillful craftsmanship and top-notch performances". It has a score of 53 out of 100 on Metacritic, based on 21 reviews. Audiences surveyed by CinemaScore gave the film a grade of "A" on a scale of A+ to F.

Roger Ebert gave the film three stars out of four, saying: "I was absorbed by A Time to Kill, and found the performances strong and convincing," and added that "this is the best of the film versions of Grisham novels, I think, and it has been directed with skill by Joel Schumacher."

The film was not without its detractors. Anthony Puccinelli of the Chicago Reader gave the film one star, calling it "worthless" and remarking: "A Time to Kill argues for vigilantism but disguises its message by making the vigilante black, allowing viewers to think their blood lust and thirst for revenge is actually empathy for the oppressed." Peter Travers of Rolling Stone felt that "they [Schumacher and screenwriter Akiva Goldsman] cram[med] in too much," adding, "This distracts from the heart of the picture, which is in the bond between Carl Lee (the brilliant [Samuel L.] Jackson is quietly devastating) and Jake, a husband and father who knows he, too, would have shot anyone who raped his little girl." Gene Siskel remarked it was "An overwrought, contrived courtroom thriller", "cornball" and concluded, "This story has been recycled out of countless better movies."

Grisham enjoyed the film, remarking: "When all was said and done I was happy with it, happy we were able to find a kid like Matthew McConaughey. It wasn't a great movie, but it was a good one."

==== Reaction in France ====
In France, the film has been the subject of controversy. Critics have accused the movie of making an apology for the death penalty and right of self-defense. A question mark was added at the end of the title ("Le Droit de tuer ?"/"The Right to Kill ?") so as not to shock the audience. Olivier Nicklaus of the cultural magazine Les Inrockuptibles described the film as "nauseating", "stinking", almost "fascist", with an "ultra-populist" script that makes one want to "vomit". Didier Peron of Libération criticized the script, calling it "extremely dirty": the movie, says the newspaper, "only militates in favour of the black cause to legitimize, after many plot twists (the resurrection of the Ku Klux Klan, courtroom trickery, all kinds of threats) the "insane" gesture of the avenging father". According to Libération, the movie "justifies the indefensible" with a "dripping sentimentalism". Jean Francois Rauger of Le Monde wrote that "the film mixes the 'politically correct' alibi of anti-racism with the justification of personal justice since the accused is black and the action takes place in a city in the South of the United States. To this moralizing ideological bombast is added an emphatic staging, for a story full of useless digressions, a characterization of the characters so crude that it borders on stupidity."

=== Accolades ===
- Golden Globe – Best Supporting Actor – Samuel L. Jackson – Nominated
- NAACP Image Award – Outstanding Motion Picture – Won
- NAACP Image Award – Best Supporting Actor in a film – Samuel L. Jackson – Won
- Blockbuster Entertainment Award – Favorite Actress – Suspense – Sandra Bullock – Won
- MTV Movie Award – Best Female Performance – Sandra Bullock – Nominated
- MTV Movie Award – Best Breakthrough Performance – Matthew McConaughey – Won
- Razzie Award – Worst Written Film Grossing Over $100 Million – Akiva Goldsman – Nominated

== Soundtrack ==
A Time to Kill

Soundtrack album by Elliot Goldenthal
- Released: August 20, 1996
- Studios: Manhattan Center Studios, New York City
- Genres: Classical, avant-garde, modernist
- Length: 35:02
- Labels: Atlantic; 82959-2
- Producer: Matthias Gohl

Elliot Goldenthal chronology
Michael Collins (1996)	A Time to Kill (1996)	The Butcher Boy (1998)

Elliot Goldenthal scored the film. AllMusic gave the soundtrack two and a half stars out of five, commenting that it "doesn't work particularly well when it's separated from the film itself."

1. "Defile and Lament" – 2:33
2. "Consolation" – 2:23
3. "Justice Wheel" – 0:46
4. "Pavane for Solace" – 2:29
5. "Abduction" – 2:58
6. "An Asurrendering" – 1:35
7. "Pavane for Loss" – 1:07
8. "Take My Hand, Precious Lord" / "Retribution" by The Jones Sisters – 6:50
9. "Torch and Hood" – 2:02
10. "Pressing Judgement" – 1:29
11. "White Sheet" – 2:38
12. "Pavane for Solace" (piano solo) – 2:06
13. "Verdict Fanfare" (For Aaron) – 4:03
14. "Take My Hand, Precious Lord" by Cissy Houston – 4:03

== See also ==
- 1995 Okinawa rape incident
- Jury nullification – Type of jury verdict in criminal trials
- The Act of Killing – 2012 documentary by Joshua Oppenheimer
- Trial film – Legal drama film centered on a trial
- Vigilante film – Film genre based on revenge theme
