= Limitations (novel) =

2006 novel by Scott Turow

- First edition
- Author: Scott Turow
- Language: English
- Genre: Legal thriller, crime
- Publisher: Picador
- Publication date: 2006
- Publication place: United States
- Media type: Print (hardback & paperback)
- Pages: 197 pp (first edition, paperback)
- ISBN: 0-312-42645-3
- OCLC: 70668916
- Dewey Decimal: 813/.54 22
- LC Class: PS3570.U754 L56 2006
- Preceded by: Ordinary Heroes
- Followed by: Innocent

Limitations is a novel by Scott Turow which was published in 2006. It is by far his shortest novel (197 pages) and prior to publication as a novel was released as a serial story in the Sunday New York Times Magazine.

== Plot summary ==
Like Turow's other novels, it is set in fictional Kindle County in Illinois, and he revives some familiar characters, including George Mason from Personal Injuries and Rusty Sabich, the hero of his acclaimed fiction debut, Presumed Innocent. Mason is now a judge, faced with the challenge of deciding a high-profile case involving a rape that reawakens his long-suppressed guilt over his own role in a similar incident decades before. To compound this inner struggle, Mason finds himself the object of threatening e-mails from an unknown source, all while trying to care for his cancer stricken wife.

== Critical reception ==
Randy Michael Signor of the Chicago Sun-Times said of the setting "if there is a more cross-examined, eviscerated fictional community than Kindle County, it remains a secret". Marc Weingarten of the Los Angeles Times stated that the novel "forces us to grapple with the notion of crime and redemption, a little Dostoevsky-lite to go with our potboiler mystery".
