= The Laws of Our Fathers =

1996 novel by Scott Turow

- First edition
- Author: Scott Turow
- Language: English
- Genre: Legal thriller, crime
- Publisher: Farrar Straus & Giroux
- Publication date: 1996
- Publication place: United States
- Media type: Print (hardback & paperback)
- Pages: 832 pp (first edition, hardback)
- Preceded by: Pleading Guilty
- Followed by: Personal Injuries

The Laws of Our Fathers, published in 1996, is Scott Turow's fourth and longest novel, at 832 pages.

== Plot ==
When last seen in Turow's The Burden of Proof, Sonia Klonsky was a prosecutor with the U. S. Attorney's office in Kindle County with a failing marriage, an infant daughter, and a single mastectomy. She becomes one of the narrators here. Now she is a Superior Court Judge presiding over the murder trial of one Nile Eddgar, who is accused of arranging the murder of his ghetto-activist mother. The story is told in two parallel narratives, one regarding the current trial and the other taking the reader through the 1960s.

Many of the minor characters in The Laws of Our Fathers also appear in Turow's other novels, which are all set in fictional, Midwestern Kindle County.
