= Innocent (2011 film) =

2011 film by Mike Robe

- Based on: Innocent by Scott Turow
- Written by: Mike Robe
- Screenplay by: Mike Robe
- Directed by: Mike Robe
- Starring: Alfred Molina; Bill Pullman; Marcia Gay Harden
- Music by: Laura Karpman
- Country of origin: United States
- Original language: English

Production
- Producers: Lisa Richardson; Mike Robe
- Cinematography: John S. Bartley
- Running time: 89 minutes
- Production company: Mike Robe Productions

Original release
- Network: TNT
- Release: November 29, 2011

Innocent is a 2011 television drama film directed by Mike Robe, starring Alfred Molina, Bill Pullman, and Marcia Gay Harden, and based on Scott Turow's 2010 novel of the same name, a sequel to Presumed Innocent. In the film, Judge Rusty Sabich (Pullman) is charged with the murder of his wife Barbara (Harden) twenty years after being cleared in the death of his mistress. Robe previously directed The Burden of Proof, another sequel to Presumed Innocent, but which focused on the character Sandy Stern.

Alan J. Pakula directed the film based on Turow's first novel, Presumed Innocent, a 1990 box office hit that starred Harrison Ford, Brian Dennehy, Raul Julia and Greta Scacchi.

== Plot summary ==
Bill Pullman plays Judge Rusty Sabich, who is romantically involved with a colleague and on trial for murder: This time he is accused of killing his wife, Barbara (Marcia Gay Harden). His accuser is his old nemesis Tommy Molto (Richard Schiff), while his longtime friend and lawyer, Sandy Stern (Alfred Molina), is in charge of the defense.

== Cast ==
- Bill Pullman as Rozat "Rusty" Sabich. Played by Harrison Ford in Presumed Innocent.
- Alfred Molina as Alejandro "Sandy" Stern. Played by Raúl Juliá in Presumed Innocent.
- Marcia Gay Harden as Barbara Sabich. Played by Bonnie Bedelia in Presumed Innocent.
- Tahmoh Penikett as Jimmy Brand
- Mariana Klaveno as Anna Vostick
- Richard Schiff as Tommy Molto. Played by Joe Grifasi in Presumed Innocent.
- Benita Ha as Dr. Stack
- Catherine Lough Haggquist as Detective Rory Gissling
- Nicole Oliver as Elaine Reese
- Jarod Joseph as Orestes Mauro
- Callard Harris as Nat Sabich. Played by Jesse Bradford in Presumed Innocent.
- Andrea Stefancikova as Waitress
- Don Ackerman as John Harnason
- Craig March as Marco Cantu
- Cameron K. Smith as Bailiff Armstrong
- Mark Steinberg as Lawyer
