= Identical (Turow novel) =

2013 novel by Scott Turow

- First edition
- Author: Scott Turow
- Language: English
- Genre: Legal thriller, crime
- Publisher: Grand Central Publishing
- Publication date: October 15, 2013
- Publication place: United States
- Media type: Print (hardback & paperback) and eBook
- Pages: 384 pp
- ISBN: 978-1-4555-2721-2
- Preceded by: Innocent
- Followed by: Testimony

Identical, published in 2013, is a novel by Scott Turow which details the complicated relationship between the Kronon and the Gianis families, who are neighbors, friends, enemies, and rivals at different times throughout. Cass Gianis is sent to prison for the murder of Dita Kronon, his girlfriend; later Paul Gianis, Cass's identical twin brother, is running for mayor and Hal Kronon, Dita's older brother, uses his wealth to attempt to derail his campaign by accusing him of participating in Dita's murder.

== Synopsis ==
The novel opens earlier in the day when Dita is murdered; Paul, Cass, and their mother Lidia are attending an ecclesiastical New Year's party at Zeus Kronon's house in September 1982. Teri Kronon, the sister of Zeus, has been best friends with Lidia since they were both seven years old; Zeus, the father of Hal and Dita, has a history with Lidia, at one point asking her father for her hand in marriage, but he was rejected because his family was considered low-class when they were both in Greece. The twins are each twenty-five years old; Paul plans to become a deputy prosecutor in the Kindle County prosecuting attorney's office under Raymond Horgan, and Cass plans to enter the police academy. Zeus has amassed a fortune in real estate by developing shopping centers around the nation, and is running for governor, but withdraws from the race after Dita is murdered.

Twenty-five years later, Cass is being released from prison after serving his sentence while his brother Paul is running for mayor; Hal, who has inherited his father's wealth and real estate empire, attends a parole hearing to object to Cass's pending release, where he accuses Paul of participating in Dita's murder. Hal continues to bankroll another investigation into Dita's murder, led by his chief of security, Evon Miller, and the original police investigator, Tim Brodie. At the same time, Hal begins running attack ads to derail Paul's mayoral campaign; Paul responds by suing Hal for defamation.

The investigation gradually reveals details of the 1982 murder that had not been discovered at that time using more advanced scientific techniques.

== Development ==
Turow credits the story of Castor and Pollux for the idea for the novel.

== Reception ==
Rosecrans Baldwin, reviewing for NPR's All Things Considered, said the novel was "not terrible [...] But in my case, the book simply didn't meet a standard that Turow had established in my mind." Jonathan Yardley, reviewing for The Washington Post, wrote that "[Turow] has handled large themes more sure-handedly in his previous novels" but "[a]s the novel makes its way to its conclusion, it steadily picks up speed and interest."
