= Reversible Errors (film) =

2004 television film

- DVD cover
- Based on: Reversible Errors by Scott Turow
- Screenplay by: Alan Sharp
- Directed by: Mike Robe
- Starring: William H. Macy; Tom Selleck; Monica Potter; Felicity Huffman; James Rebhorn; Shemar Moore; Glenn Plummer; Ron Canada
- Theme music composer: Laura Karpman
- Country of origin: United States
- Original language: English

Production
- Producers: Mike Robe; Peter Sadowski; Randy Sutter
- Cinematography: Derick V. Underschultz
- Editor: Tod Feuerman
- Running time: 173 minutes
- Production company: Von Zerneck Sertner Films

Original release
- Network: CBS
- Release: May 23 – May 25, 2004

Reversible Errors is a 2004 American made-for-television crime thriller film based on the 2002 novel of the same name by Scott Turow. It was directed by Mike Robe, who previously directed Scott Turow's The Burden of Proof, and stars Tom Selleck and William H. Macy. Filming was done in and around Halifax, Nova Scotia, and featured shots of Halifax City Hall and Angus L. Macdonald Bridge.

The film was first shown by CBS in two parts on May 23 and 25, 2004. Channel 5 in the United Kingdom has chosen to show it as a single 173 minute film.

== Plot ==
A young woman and two other people are killed in a Kindle County local bar. Experienced detective sergeant Larry Starczek (Tom Selleck) begins investigation on the murders. Soon everything points to the small-time thief, Squirrel. Larry arrests him and makes the thief confess. After a short trial, the Squirrel is sent to death row.

The story now moves seven years later, as new evidence surfaces. Nobody is confident that it was Squirrel who actually killed the victims years ago. Furthermore, the judge from his trial may have been compromised.

== Cast ==
- William H. Macy as Arthur Raven
- Tom Selleck as Larry Starczek
- Monica Potter as Muriel Wynn
- Felicity Huffman as Gillian Sullivan
- James Rebhorn as Erno Erdai
- Shemar Moore as Collins Farwell
- Glenn Plummer as Romeo "Squirrel" Gandolf
- Yanna McIntosh as Genevieve Carriere
- Nigel Bennett as Talmadge Loman
- David Fox as Judge Harlow
- Deborah Allen as Waitress
- Mauralea Austin as Tina, Bistro Woman
- Doug Barron as Funeral Reporter
- Robert Bockstael as Detective
- Ray Brimicombe as Judge Harlow's Bailiff
- Ron Canada as Jackson Aires
- Eugene Clark as Chief Harold Greer
- Stephen Coats as Gala Host
- Christina Collins as Louisa Remardi
- Roger Dunn as Leo Carnahan
- John Dunsworth as Ike
- John Evans as Tom Woznicki
- Brian Heighton as Paul Judson
- Martha Irving as Woznicki's Woman
- Eric Lemoine as Forensic Officer
- Gary Levert as Evidence Room Officer
- Rhonda McLean as Marta Stern
- Gerry Mendicino as Gus Leonidas
- Frank Nakashima as Daniel "Painless" Kumagi
- Michael Pellerin as Jail Deputy
- Juanita Peters as Female Guard
- Nancy Regan as Reporter
- Allan Royal as O'Grady
- Shawn Tanaka as Prisoner
- Ian Tench as Judge Sullivan's Bailiff
- Robert Verlaque as Dickerman

== Home media ==
Reversible Errors was released on DVD in the United States on October 12, 2004.
