= Identical =

Identical may refer to:

- Identical, when two things are the same, see Identity (philosophy)
- Identical (Hopkins novel), a 2008 young adult novel by Ellen Hopkins
- Identical (Turow novel), a 2013 legal drama novel by Scott Turow
- The Identical, a 2014 American musical drama film
- Mathematically identical
- Identical (film), a 2011 American independent thriller film
- Identical (musical), a 2022 stage musical
- "Identical", a song by Phoenix from Alpha Zulu, 2022

== See also ==
- Identity (disambiguation)
- Identical particles, particles that cannot be distinguished from one another
- Identical twins, two offspring resulting from the same pregnancy in which a single egg is fertilized
