= Presumed Innocent (film) =

1990 American film by Alan J. Pakula

- Theatrical release poster
- Directed by: Alan J. Pakula
- Screenplay by: Frank Pierson; Alan J. Pakula
- Based on: Presumed Innocent by Scott Turow
- Produced by: Sydney Pollack; Mark Rosenberg
- Starring: Harrison Ford; Brian Dennehy; Raul Julia; Bonnie Bedelia; Paul Winfield; Greta Scacchi
- Cinematography: Gordon Willis
- Edited by: Evan A. Lottman
- Music by: John Williams
- Production company: Mirage Enterprises
- Distributed by: Warner Bros.
- Release dates: July 25, 1990 (Los Angeles); July 27, 1990 (North America)
- Running time: 127 minutes
- Country: United States
- Language: English
- Budget: $20 million
- Box office: $221 million

Presumed Innocent is a 1990 American legal thriller based on the 1987 novel of the same name by Scott Turow. Directed by Alan J. Pakula and written by Pakula and Frank Pierson, it stars Harrison Ford, Brian Dennehy, Raúl Juliá, Bonnie Bedelia, Paul Winfield and Greta Scacchi. The film follows Rusty Sabich (Ford), a prosecutor put on trial for the murder of his colleague and mistress Carolyn Polhemus (Scacchi).

Several studios and producers fought to secure the film rights one year before the novel was published. Producers Sydney Pollack and Mark Rosenberg acquired the rights in December 1986 and hired Pierson to write the script. After an unsuccessful pre-production development at United Artists, the project moved to Warner Bros. Pictures, and Pakula was brought in to rewrite the script with Pierson before signing on as the film's director in January 1989. Principal photography commenced in July 1989 and concluded in October of that year, with a budget of $20 million. Filming took place on locations in Detroit, Windsor, Ontario, and New Jersey, and on soundstages at Kaufman Astoria Studios in New York.

Presumed Innocent premiered at the Fox Bruin Theater in Los Angeles, California, on July 25, 1990, before being released across North America on July 27, 1990. The film has an approval rating of 86% on Rotten Tomatoes, with critics praising its directing, acting, and writing. It grossed $221 million worldwide and became the eighth-highest-grossing film of 1990. The film was followed by a television miniseries, The Burden of Proof, in 1992, and a television film sequel, Innocent, in 2011.

== Plot ==
Rožat "Rusty" Sabich is the right-hand man of Kindle County prosecutor Raymond Horgan and is known as an effective and ruthless prosecutor. In his most recent case, Rusty oversees the prosecution of a mother who tortured her son by placing his head in a vise in their basement, delivering a damning closing argument where he uses the boy's own words - "mommy hurt my head" - to convict her.

Shortly thereafter, Rusty's colleague Carolyn Polhemus is found raped and murdered in her apartment. Horgan insists that Rusty take charge of the investigation, as he faces a fierce re-election challenge from Nico Della Guardia and Tommy Molto, both disgruntled former members of his office. Rusty faces a conflict of interest since he had a brief sexual affair with Carolyn; despite having since reconciled with his wife Barbara, he remains obsessed with Carolyn.

Det. Harold Greer is initially in charge of the murder investigation, but Rusty has him replaced with his friend Dan "Lip" Lipranzer, whom he asks to limit the scope of the murder investigation. Horgan loses patience with Rusty's handling of the case, particularly after admitting he also had a brief relationship with Carolyn. When Della Guardia wins the election, he and Molto (who replaces Rusty as chief deputy) reappoint Greer to take over the case. Greer learns about the affair, and Rusty is arrested and indicted for Carolyn's murder.

Rusty hires Sandy Stern as his lawyer, while the case is assigned to Judge Larren Lyttle. As the trial begins, an important piece of evidence - a beer glass with Rusty's fingerprints - goes missing and Lyttle refuses to delay until it is found. Horgan perjures himself on the stand, claiming Rusty insisted on handling the investigation and was deliberately slow in pursuing leads. However, Stern forces Raymond to admit that Rusty never confessed to having an affair with Carolyn, and Raymond's own affair with her caused him to show improper favoritism. Lip uncovers that Carolyn had stolen a file for a bribery case involving a criminal named Leon Wells, one of Carolyn's old clients from her days as a probation officer. Wells confesses that Carolyn helped him solicit and deliver bribe money to Judge Lyttle to escape prosecution.

The thrust of Stern's defense is that Della Guardia and Molto have framed Rusty to exploit the case's public notoriety, repeatedly referencing the missing file to unsettle Lyttle. During cross-examination of the coroner, it is revealed that Carolyn underwent a tubal ligation, thus having no reason to use the spermicidal contraceptive which was found on her. Stern then proves the fluid sample was not actually taken from Carolyn's body, implying the coroner is complicit in framing Rusty. Based on the disappearance of the beer glass, the lack of motive, and the fluid sample's validity nullified, Judge Lyttle promptly dismisses the charges against Rusty.

Rusty confronts Stern about the bribery file, believing that he blackmailed Lyttle into dismissing. Stern reveals that Lyttle also had a sexual relationship with Carolyn and that both he and Raymond knew that Lyttle was taking bribes. Though Lyttle had offered his resignation, Raymond felt that he was a brilliant judge and deserved another chance. Despite this, Stern believes Lyttle tried the case with integrity. He then pointedly asks Rusty if justice really was served, implying he has doubts. Lip meets with Rusty and reveals the missing beer glass, explaining he didn't bother returning it to evidence when he was taken off the case. He admits he also doubts Rusty's innocence. Disillusioned, Rusty throws the glass into a river.

While repairing a fence on his property, Rusty discovers a small hatchet coated with blood and hair and realizes it is the murder weapon. Barbara discovers him cleaning it and, in a detached monologue, admits she murdered Carolyn because of the affair, which drove her into a near-suicidal depression. She explains she had left enough evidence for Rusty to know it was her but did not anticipate him being charged. In a voice-over, Rusty explains that Carolyn's murder remains unsolved as trying two people for the same crime is impossible and he could never bring himself to take Barbara away from their son. Rusty accepts his role in bringing about Carolyn's death, stating that as with most cases there is "a crime, a victim, and punishment".

== Cast ==
- Harrison Ford as Rusty Sabich
- Brian Dennehy as Raymond Horgan
- Raul Julia as Sandy Stern
- Bonnie Bedelia as Barbara Sabich
- Paul Winfield as Judge Larren Lyttle
- Greta Scacchi as Carolyn Polhemus
- John Spencer as Detective Lipranzer
- Joe Grifasi as Tommy Molto
- Tom Mardirosian as Nico Della Guardia
- Anna Maria Horsford as Eugenia
- Sab Shimono as "Painless" Kumagai
- Bradley Whitford as Jamie Kemp

== Production ==
=== Development ===
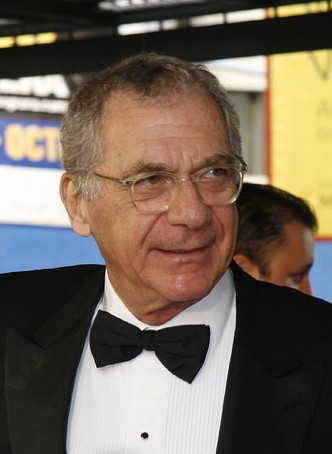
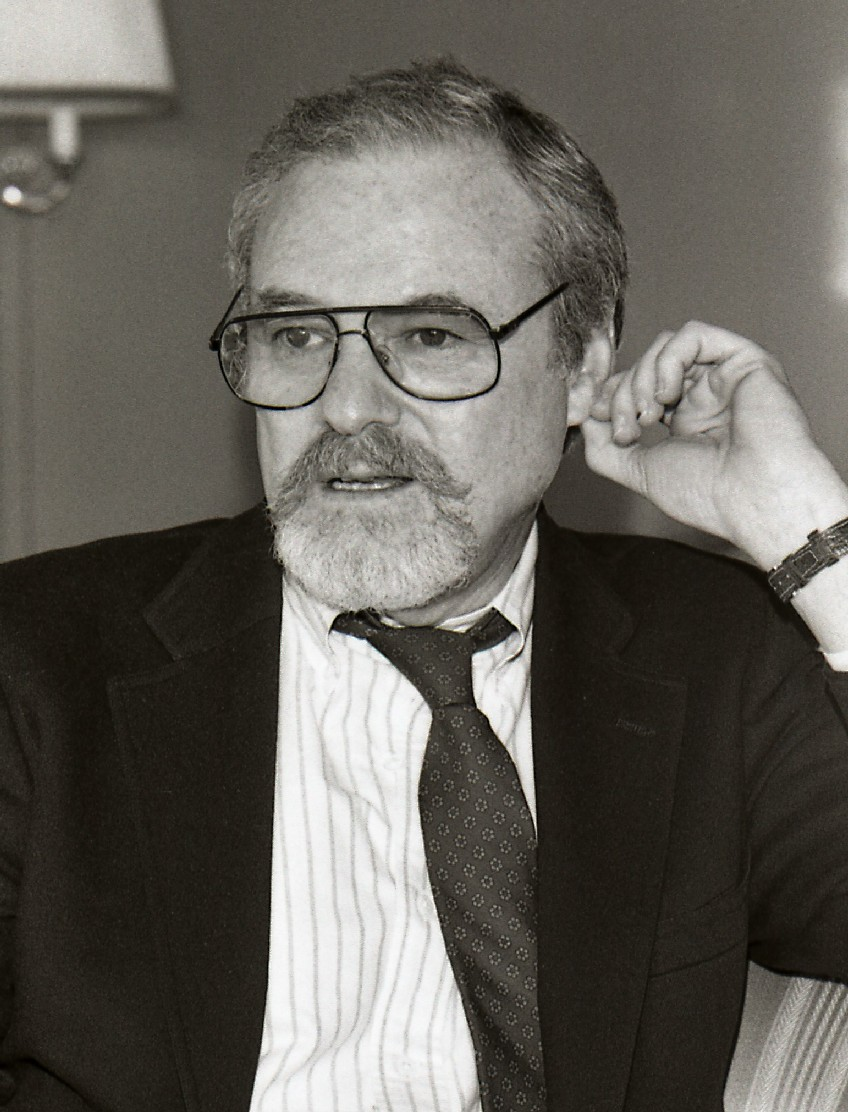
From left to right: Sydney Pollack, producer of Presumed Innocent, and Alan J. Pakula, who directed the film and co-wrote the screenplay.

Scott Turow's 1987 novel Presumed Innocent had first attracted film producers a year before it was published. The film rights were the subject of a bidding war among a host of established studios and producers. David Brown and Richard D. Zanuck made the first bid of $75,000. Don Simpson and Jerry Bruckheimer initially offered $300,000, financed by Paramount Pictures, but backed down when bids climbed to $750,000. Peter Guber and Jon Peters, and Sydney Pollack and Mark Rosenberg of Mirage Enterprises made $1 million bids of their own money. Metro-Goldwyn-Mayer and Irwin Winkler also made bids, while Universal Pictures passed on the project. After Pollack and Rosenberg acquired the rights in December 1986, United Artists negotiated with the producers to finance and distribute the film. In May 1987, Pollack hired Frank Pierson to write the script. Shortly after, United Artists backed out as a distributor. Roger Birnbaum, head of worldwide production for United Artists, claimed that the studio found the project "just too expensive". In July 1988, the project moved to Warner Bros.

Pollack and Rosenberg sent the script to Alan J. Pakula, who felt that it needed improvement and spent a year rewriting it with Pierson. Regarding the screenwriting process, Turow said, "There were three large narrative problems to solve. Point of view; getting around the first person narrative; time sequence; it's all flashback and Hollywood doesn't like that; and then just an awful lot of plot." Pierson originally envisioned the film adaptation as being "a movie full of sex and blood". Pakula felt that the concept of justice was more central to the story. He also wanted to present the film in a visual style that echoed the novel's narrative. In making various changes from the novel, Pakula and Pierson added new dialogue and rewrote the ending. Pakula signed on to direct the film in January 1989.

=== Casting ===
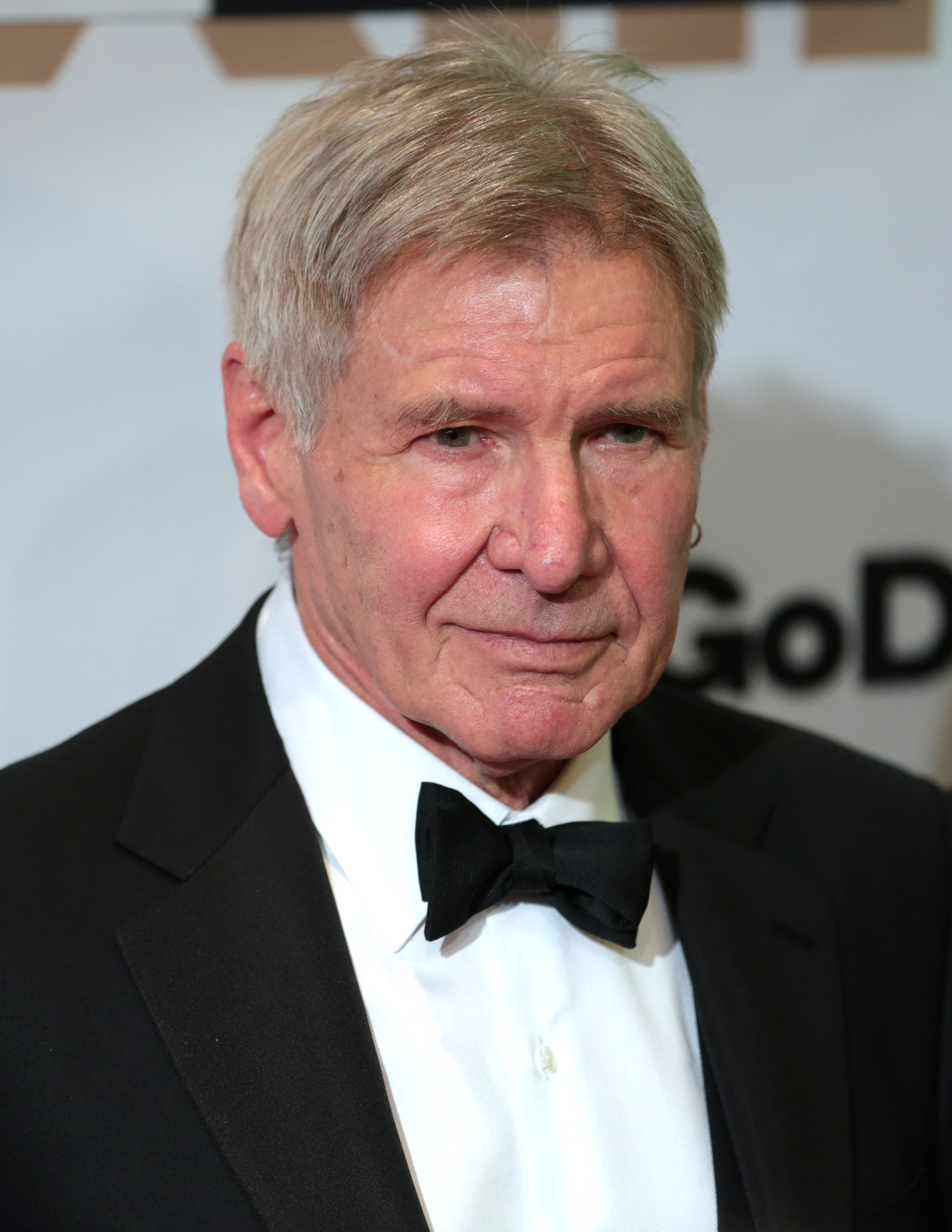
Harrison Ford, who plays Rusty Sabich in the film.

Several established actors were considered to play Rusty Sabich. Kevin Costner turned down the role, and Robert Redford was vetoed by Pollack due to his age. When he was hired to direct the film, Pakula only offered the role to Harrison Ford, believing that the actor possessed an "everyman quality" that best suited the character. Ford's casting was confirmed in March 1989. He received a $7 million salary for the role. Turow was initially uncertain of Ford portraying Rusty but relented after seeing a few of the actor's films. Ford said, "Friends warned me this was a tough role because Rusty is such a passive, interior character. Though Rusty's in every scene, all the action takes place around him. Things happen to him." Upon being cast, Ford read the novel to avoid arguments over events and details that were left out in the book. He also suggested to Pakula that Rusty should have a buzz cut. He explained, "There are many things I found I could express with that short haircut. Simplest of all, I wanted to tell the audience to leave their baggage at home — not to expect the Harrison Ford they've seen before."

In preparing for their roles, the actors were granted access to lawyers who would act as advisors. Ford observed murder trials with Pakula at the Recorder's Court in Detroit and viewed training footage from the Michigan Prosecutors' Association. Greta Scacchi, who plays Carolyn Polhemus, observed Linda Fairstein, head of the Manhattan District Attorney's sex crimes unit. Raúl Juliá, who plays Sandy Stern, researched his role by meeting with criminal lawyer Michael Kennedy. Paul Winfield lobbied for the role of Judge Larren Lyttle upon reading the novel and learning that the adaptation was to be directed by Pakula. Winfield met with New York Supreme Court judge Bruce M. Wright, who insisted that he wear a judiciary robe and observe several cases.

The film marked the cinematic debut of both Jeffrey Wright and Joseph Mazzello.

=== Filming ===
Pakula spent three weeks rehearsing with the actors before principal photography commenced on July 31, 1989, with a budget of $20 million. Filming began in Detroit, where the production first filmed exterior scenes. Locations included the Renaissance Center's Westin Hotel, Philip A. Hart Plaza, the Woodbridge Tavern, Eastern Market, Jackie's Bar and Restaurant, St. Aubin Marina, and the International Plaza garage rooftop. On August 3, 1989, the production moved to Reaume Park in Windsor, Ontario for a 13-hour shoot. After filming in Detroit ended on August 9, 1989, the production moved to Kaufman Astoria Studios in Queens. The filmmakers constructed a courtroom modeled after one in Cleveland, Ohio, that was unavailable for filming. The production then moved to Newark, New Jersey. For two days, the North Reformed Church was used to depict the funeral of Carolyn Polhemus. From August 14 to August 15, the filmmakers shot scenes at Newark City Hall. The Essex County Veterans Courthouse was used for a brief courtroom sequence, and Newark's city morgue was used to depict the medical office of Dr. Kumagai. A housing project scheduled for demolition was used for a scene depicting Rusty and Detective Lipranzer's interrogation of a suspect.

In late August, the crew relocated to Allendale, New Jersey. A suburban house on East Orchard Street was used to film exterior and interior scenes set in the Sabich family home. The house's cellar was used to film a scene involving Rusty and his wife. The cast and crew then returned to Kaufman Astoria Studios to film the trial scenes. Principal photography concluded on October 24, 1989.

== Release ==
Presumed Innocent held its world premiere at the Fox Bruin Theater in the Westwood neighborhood of Los Angeles, California, on July 25, 1990, with an afterparty held at Chasen's restaurant. The film was released on July 27, 1990, distributed by Warner Bros. A soundtrack album featuring the score by John Williams was released by the record label Varèse Sarabande on August 7, 1990.

=== Box office ===
Released to a total of 1,349 theaters in the United States and Canada, the film grossed $11,718,981 on its first weekend, securing the number one position at the box office. The film earned an additional $10,176,663—only a 13.2% overall decrease from the previous weekend— and moved to second place behind Ghost. In its third weekend, the film grossed an additional $7,901,866, for an overall domestic gross of $42,012,238. It grossed an additional $6,101,374 on its fourth weekend. The film returned to fourth place on its fifth week, grossing an additional $4,646,004, and returned to third place for the following two weeks.

Presumed Innocent grossed $86,303,188 during its North American theatrical run. Coupled with its international take of $135 million, it accumulated $221,303,188 in worldwide box office totals. In North America, it was the twelfth highest-grossing film of 1990, and the fourth highest-grossing R-rated film released that year. Worldwide, it was the eighth highest-grossing film of 1990, as well as Warner Bros.' highest-grossing film that year.

=== Home media ===
The film was released on VHS and LaserDisc on March 27, 1991, by Warner Home Video. It was released on DVD on December 17, 1997. On February 23, 2010, the film was released on Blu-ray as a "Thriller Double Feature" alongside Frantic (1988).

== Reception ==
=== Critical response ===
The review aggregation website Rotten Tomatoes gives the film an approval rating of 86% based on 58 reviews. The website's critical consensus reads, "Thanks to an outstanding script, focused direction by Alan Pakula, and a riveting performance from Harrison Ford, Presumed Innocent is the kind of effective courtroom thriller most others aspire to be." On Metacritic it has a score of 72% based on reviews from 26 critics, indicating "generally favorable reviews". Audiences polled by CinemaScore gave the film an average grade of "A−" on an A+ to F scale.

Warner Bros. requested in press releases that critics not discuss the film's ending. Jay Boyar of the Orlando Sentinel surmised, "It's not that Warner Bros. is actually concerned that reviewers will tip the solution to the murder mystery. It's that the studio wants to further the impression that the movie is full of surprises." Richard Schickel of Time magazine disregarded the request and revealed Rusty's innocence in his review. He wrote, "Carolyn's murderer has an excellent motive both for killing her ... But it is hard to accept the possibility that the real perpetrator would leave his escape from the trap entirely to chance." Roger Ebert of the Chicago Sun-Times stated, "Even if you think you know what the solution is, the performances are so clever and the screenplay ... is so subtle that it could well turn out that your expectations are wrong."

Sheila Benson, writing for the Los Angeles Times, stated, "Intelligent, complex and enthralling, Presumed Innocent ... is one of those rare films where all the players seem to be in a state of grace, where the working of the machinery never shows and after it's over, one runs and reruns its intricacies with a profound sense of satisfaction." Peter Travers, writing for Rolling Stone, called the film "a smart, passionate, steadily engrossing thriller". Janet Maslin of The New York Times praised Pakula's direction, writing, "Pakula has directed an intense, enveloping, gratifyingly thorough screen adaptation of Mr. Turow's story." Film critic Jonathan Rosenbaum wrote that film was "a top-notch courtroom drama that will keep you guessing if you haven't read the book; even if you have, it is still a very well crafted story." Variety magazine praised the performances, writing, "Ford, in a very mature, subtle, lowkey performance, pulls off the difficult feat of making it impossible to be sure. Bedelia is wondrously controlled, and Scacchi, sans any hint of a European accent, is convincing and seductive." Gene Siskel of the Chicago Tribune praised the supporting cast, writing, "Raul Julia is excellent as Ford's sinister defense attorney. John Spencer, Joe Grifasi, Tom Mardirosian and Sab Shimono are each compelling as investigator, political lackey, prosecutor and coroner."

Owen Gleiberman, writing for Entertainment Weekly, criticized Pakula's direction, stating, "Pakula is good at laying out an intricate, almost mathematical series of events (his best film remains All the President's Men), but he's not big on atmosphere. The movie could have used some of the bowels-of-the-city grit Sidney Lumet brought to Q&A." Dave Kehr, also writing for the Chicago Tribune, stated, "Though it's a handsome film, carefully staged and courageously low-key, the transition to the screen only exaggerates the disposable nature of the material while depriving it of the novel's one stylistic strength, its unreliable narrator."

=== Accolades ===
Presumed Innocent received several nominations, with particular recognition for its screenplay by Alan J. Pakula and Frank Pierson. The film received an Edgar Allan Poe Award nomination for Best Motion Picture, and a USC Scripter Award nomination for Pakula, Pierson and the novel by Turow.

List of Accolades
Award	Date of ceremony	Category	Recipients	Result	Ref.
Edgar Allan Poe Awards	1990	Best Motion Picture	Alan J. Pakula, Frank Pierson	Nominated	
USC Scripter Awards	1991	USC Scripter Award	Alan J. Pakula, Frank Pierson (screenplay); Scott Turow (novel)	Nominated	

== Other iterations ==
=== Miniseries ===
Presumed Innocent was followed by a two-part television miniseries, The Burden of Proof (1992). Based on Turow's 1990 novel, the miniseries focuses on defense attorney Sandy Stern (played by Héctor Elizondo), who investigates his wife's past following her apparent suicide. Presumed Innocent co-star Brian Dennehy appeared in a separate role as Stern's brother-in-law. The first chapter of the miniseries aired on the ABC network on February 9, 1992, with the second part airing the following night on February 10.

=== Television film ===
A television sequel, Innocent (2011), was based on Turow's 2010 sequel novel to Presumed Innocent. Set twenty years after the events of the 1990 film, the story follows Rusty Sabich (Bill Pullman), who is charged with the murder of his wife Barbara (Marcia Gay Harden). Innocent aired on TNT on November 30, 2011, as part of the network's "Mystery Movie Night", a collection of six made-for-television films based on best-selling novels.

=== Television series ===
Apple TV+ produced an eight-part miniseries based on the film, starring Jake Gyllenhaal as Rusty Sabich. The miniseries debuted on June 12, 2024.
