= Pleading Guilty =

1993 novel by Scott Turow

- First edition
- Author: Scott Turow
- Language: English
- Genre: Legal thriller, crime
- Publisher: Farrar Straus & Giroux
- Publication date: 1993
- Publication place: United States
- Media type: Print (hardback & paperback)
- Pages: 468 pp (first edition, hardback)
- ISBN: 9780374234577
- OCLC: 442321900
- Preceded by: The Burden of Proof
- Followed by: The Laws of Our Fathers

Pleading Guilty (1993), is Scott Turow's third novel, and like the previous two it is set in fictional Kindle County. The story is a legal thriller about Mack Malloy, a middle-aged lawyer basically waiting to retire, who is assigned by his firm to track down another attorney who has embezzled millions from the firm and disappeared.

Many of the minor characters in Pleading Guilty also appear in Turow's other novels.

A pilot for a television show based on Pleading Guilty was shot in 2010 but not picked up by the FOX network.
