= Testimony (Turow novel) =

Novel

- First edition
- Author: Scott Turow
- Language: English
- Genre: Legal thriller, crime
- Publisher: Grand Central Publishing
- Publication date: May 16, 2017
- Publication place: United States
- Media type: Print (hardback & paperback) and eBook
- Pages: 384 pp
- ISBN: 978-1-4555-5352-5
- Preceded by: Identical

Testimony, published in 2017, is a novel by Scott Turow which details ex-United States Attorney for Kindle County Bill ten Boom's first case on the International Criminal Court (ICC); ten Boom investigates the overnight disappearance and suspected massacre of an entire refugee village of more than 400 Romani people in the unsettled political atmosphere following the Bosnian war.

== Synopsis ==
Roma refugees had settled in a makeshift village named Barupra in Bosnia, on the outskirts of an abandoned coal mine. The novel opens in March 2015 with the testimony of Ferko Rincic, sole survivor of the massacre, before the ICC. Rincic testifies that Chetniks had come on the night of April 27, 2004, forcing the Roma onto trucks at gunpoint while he was hiding in an outhouse; according to Rincic, the evacuated Roma were then gathered into an old coal excavation and explosive charges were detonated, burying the entire village within.

In January 2015, Bill ten Boom decided to retire from his lucrative private practice and accept a position with the ICC at the request of his colleague from law school, Roger Clewey. In retrospect, ten Boom sees it as the last step in divorcing his life and career from the fictional Kindle County; the majority of the story is set in European locations including The Hague and Bosnia.

Because the Roma had tipped American forces to the location of Laza Kajevic, a wanted war criminal, just prior to the massacre, one potential motive for the crime would have been retaliation for the unsuccessful capture attempt. However, Rincic's testimony, which included a detail that the Chetniks spoke Bosnian with a foreign accent, pointed towards the potential involvement of nearby American troops. The sensitive political situation and the United States' withdrawal from the ICC (under the American Service-Members' Protection Act) meant that an investigation led by an American prosecutor would be acceptable, leading to the selection of ten Boom.

The remainder of the novel details the legal maneuvering in the ICC, forensic investigation by ten Boom and his chief investigator, an ex-Belgian police officer named Goos, and ten Boom's personal life over the next few months.

== Reception ==
Reviewing for The Guardian, Steven Poole wrote "the book ... is expertly handled. [...] Turow has not lost his gift for marshalling huge amounts of information and orchestrating its careful release to the reader." Kirkus Reviews described ten Boom as "a too-familiar, not very fascinating character [going through a male midlife crisis] to carry the tale" but stated the novel was worth its "complicated, trenchant, and pertinent finish."
