= Ultimate Punishment =

2003 book by Scott Turow

- Author: Scott Turow
- Language: English
- Genre: Autobiography
- Publisher: Farrar Straus & Giroux
- Publication date: 2003
- Publication place: United States
- Media type: Print (hardback & paperback)
- Pages: 164 (paperback)
- ISBN: 0-374-12873-1 (paperback)
- OCLC: 52030296
- Dewey Decimal: 345.73/0773 21
- LC Class: KF9227.C2 T87 2003
- Preceded by: Reversible Errors
- Followed by: Ordinary Heroes

Ultimate Punishment: A Lawyer's Reflections on Dealing with the Death Penalty is a 2003 series of autobiographical reflections regarding the death penalty. It is written by Scott Turow and marks his return to non-fiction for the first time since One L in 1977.

Turow bases his opinions on his experiences as a prosecutor and, in his years after leaving the United States Attorney's Office in Chicago, working on behalf of death-row inmates, as well as his two years on Illinois's Commission on Capital Punishment, charged by then-Gov. George Ryan with reviewing the state's death penalty system. Turow, a self-described "death penalty agnostic," presents both sides of the death penalty debate and admits that over time he seems to change sides, depending on the argument. He finally concludes that "the pivotal question instead is whether a system of justice can be constructed that reaches on the rare, right cases, without also occasionally condemning the innocent or the undeserving," and reveals "[t]oday, I would still do as I did when Paul Simon asked whether Illinois should retain capital punishment. I voted no." (pp. 114–115)

Turow's reflections include:

- Thoughts on victims' rights vs. community rights
- Whether execution is a deterrent
- The possible execution of an innocent person
- If not the death penalty, what to do with the worst offenders

He also visits a maximum security prison and meets multiple-murderer Henry Brisbon, who, Turow says, "most closely resembles... Hannibal Lecter".

== Reception ==
Ultimate Punishment received the Robert F. Kennedy Center for Justice and Human Rights 2004 Book award given annually to a novelist who "most faithfully and forcefully reflects Robert F. Kennedy's purposes - his concern for the poor and the powerless, his struggle for honest and even-handed justice, his conviction that a decent society must assure all young people a fair chance, and his faith that a free democracy can act to remedy disparities of power and opportunity." Kirkus Reviews described the book as "Well-presented, if dry and hardly original". Publishers Weekly said of the book that "The early chapters may confuse listeners ... but even so, this is a provocative, worthwhile listen".

Reviewing the book, The Independent newspaper in February 2004, Robert Verkaik said that Turow's "experiences as a young prosecutor and a death-row defence attorney have given him a unique insight into how the death penalty works in America" and further stated that "Although one always suspects Turow must be against the death penalty, he cleverly deploys the suspense of his fiction to raise doubts about his true position".
