= John J. Cound =

American legal scholar

- Born: John James Cound; February 7, 1928 (age 98)
- Education: George Washington University (BA); Harvard Law School (LLB)
- Occupation: Legal scholar
- Spouse: Jeanne

John "Jack" James Cound (born February 7, 1928), is an American legal scholar, an expert in civil procedure. For 35 years he was a professor at the University of Minnesota Law School, where he taught admiralty, civil procedure, complex litigation, conflict of laws, evidence, federal courts, and professional responsibility.

== Biography ==
Cound received his B.A. degree from George Washington University. He earned an LL.B. degree from Harvard Law School, where he graduated magna cum laude, and was Note Editor of the Harvard Law Review. Upon completion of his LL.B. degree, Cound clerked for Judge Learned Hand of the United States Court of Appeals for the Second Circuit. He then served as an attorney for the Appellate Section of the Civil Division of the United States Department of Justice. The first case that Cound helped handle at the Department of Justice was Brown v. Board of Education.

Cound joined the faculty of the University of Minnesota Law School in 1956. He was a visiting professor at the UCLA School of Law, University of North Carolina School of Law, University of Texas School of Law, University of Georgia School of Law, University of Kentucky College of Law, Washington University School of Law, Hamline University School of Law, and the Kiel University in Kiel, Germany. He also served on the faculty of the Association of American Law Schools Orientation Program in American Law.

Cound published important academic works over the course of his career. These include: Civil Procedure: Cases and Materials (1st ed. 1968 & Supp. 1968, 2d ed. 1974, 3d ed. 1980, 4th ed. 1985) (with Jack H. Friedenthal & Arthur R. Miller); Civil Procedure Supplement (1968, 1970, 1972, 1974, 1976, 1978, 1980, 1982, 1984, 1985) (with Jack H. Friedenthal & Arthur R. Miller), Minnesota Jury Instruction Guides, Criminal (1977) (reporter), Pleading, Joinder, and Discovery: Cases and Materials (1968) (with Jack H. Friedenthal & Arthur R. Miller).

Cound resides in St. Paul, Minnesota, with his wife Jeanne.
