= Ordinary Heroes (novel) =

2005 novel by Scott Turow

- First edition
- Author: Scott Turow
- Language: English
- Genre: Legal thriller, war novel
- Publisher: Farrar Straus & Giroux
- Publication date: 2005
- Publication place: United States
- Media type: Print (hardback & paperback)
- Pages: 368 pp (first edition, hardback); 494 (paperback)
- ISBN: 0-446-61748-2 (paperback)
- OCLC: 71756644
- Preceded by: Ultimate Punishment
- Followed by: Limitations

Ordinary Heroes, published in 2005, is a novel by Scott Turow. It tells the story of Stewart Dubinsky, a journalist who uncovers writings of his father while going through his things following his funeral. The novel, told in first person, traces Stewart's uncovering of his father David's role in World War II in the European Theatre as a captain in the U.S. Army Judge Advocate General's Corps. It includes scenes set during the Battle of the Bulge. This develops into a startling revelation about who Dubinsky's mother really is and how his father came to meet her.

Many of the minor characters in Ordinary Heroes also appear in other Turow novels, which are all set in fictional, Midwestern Kindle County.
