= Presumed Guilty (novel) =

2025 novel by Scott Turow

- First edition cover
- Author: Scott Turow
- Language: English
- Genre: Legal thriller, crime
- Publisher: Grand Central Publishing
- Publication date: January 2025
- Publication place: United States
- Media type: Print (hardback)
- Pages: 544 (first edition)
- ISBN: 978-1538706367
- OCLC: 1436907815
- Preceded by: Innocent

Presumed Guilty is a legal thriller written by Scott Turow and first published by Grand Central Publishing on January 14, 2025. The book, Turow's 14th novel, is the third installment in a series that follows Rožat "Rusty" Sabich, following Presumed Innocent (1987) and Innocent (2010). Sabich is now a retiree living in the Midwest. His life is upturned when the son of his fiancée is accused of murdering the daughter of the local prosecutor. The 77-year old Sabich returns to the courtroom to mount the son's defense.

== Conception ==
The protagonist of Presumed Guilty, Rusty Sabich, was last seen in the novel Innocent, having just been released from prison. That previous novel left Sabich in a dark place, and Turow felt compelled to leave the character on a better note. Turow explained in an interview with NPR:

At the end of that novel, Rusty had just been released from prison. It left him in such a sad and shattered state that I felt I owed him more - this character whose career has been synonymous with my own. I finished that book thinking, I really can't leave him quite this miserable. And thematically, to me, this book is about an important theme, which is, can you do better the second time around?

Turow also felt driven to write the novel out of a desire to explore the persistence of parents' love of their child, even when the child has been accused of a horrible crime. Turow told The New York Times that the plot received inspiration from the killing of Gabby Petito–– the parents of Petito's boyfriend, the alleged murderer, had seemed to support him amid the allegations.

== Premise ==
"Rusty" Sabich, now 77, is living in a rural, Midwestern community. He plans to marry his girlfriend, Bea, and to imminently retire as an arbitration judge. Sabich gets pulled back into the courtroom, however, when Bea's son becomes embroiled in a murder case. The son, Aaron, is charged with the murder of Mae, who is the daughter of the local prosecutor. Both Aaron and Mae have a history of drug abuse, though Aaron had been working to turn his life around. Few lawyers want to defend Aaron, for fear of running afoul of the local prosecutor. Rusty, despite his inexperience as a defense lawyer, takes on the case. A challenge for the defense is dealing with potential racial issues. Aaron is Black, while most of the populace is White.

== Reception ==
Tom Nolan of The Wall Street Journal described Presumed Guilty as a "swift narrative full of technical detail, behavioral scrutiny and quick turns of plot". Writing for Slate, Laura Miller praised Turow's deft portrayal of drama inside the courtroom; however, she found the novel less engrossing than the two previous installments in the series, writing: "For all the reliable pleasures of Turow’s courtroom drama, his hero has shed the complications that once led him to the dock and, with them, everything that made him interesting".

Turow reported the existence of a film deal for the book to NPR in January 2025, though the details of the deal remained undisclosed.

Presumed Guilty was shortlisted for the Edgar Allan Poe Award for Best Novel in 2026.
