= Personal Injuries =

1999 novel

- Author: Scott Turow
- Language: English
- Genre: Legal thriller, Crime novel
- Publisher: Farrar Straus & Giroux
- Publication date: 1999
- Publication place: United States
- Media type: Print (hardback & paperback)
- Pages: 403 (hardback)
- ISBN: 03-7428-194-7
- OCLC: 41315518
- Dewey Decimal: 813/.54 21
- LC Class: PS3570.U754 P47 1999b
- Preceded by: The Laws of Our Fathers
- Followed by: Reversible Errors

Personal Injuries is a novel by the American author Scott Turow, published in 1999. Like all of Turow's novels, it takes place in fictional Kindle County and many of the characters are recognized from other Turow novels.

== Plot ==
The novel begins with Robbie Feaver seeking advice from attorney George Mason, the narrator. Feaver admits that he has been bribing several judges in the Common Law Claims Division to win favorable judgments for years. U.S. Attorney Stan Sennett has uncovered Feaver's secret and wants Feaver to strike a deal to get at the man he believes to be at the center of all the legal corruption in the metropolitan area, Brendan Tuohey, the Presiding Judge of Common Law Claims and heir apparent to the Chief Justice of Kindle County Superior Court. An undercover scheme is put in motion to trap the guilty parties. The novel follows the FBI as it pursues the legal community of Kindle County in a web of tapped phones, concealed cameras, and wired spies.

== Awards ==
- Time Magazine named Personal Injuries as one of the Best Fiction Novels of 1999.
