= Charles Alan Wright =

American lawyer & law professor (1927–2000)

Charles Wright
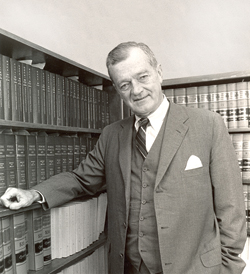
- Born: September 3, 1927; Philadelphia, Pennsylvania, U.S.
- Died: July 7, 2000 (aged 72); Austin, Texas, U.S.
- Education: Wesleyan University; Yale University
- Political party: Republican

Charles Alan Wright (September 3, 1927 – July 7, 2000) was an American constitutional lawyer widely considered to be the foremost authority in the United States on constitutional law and federal procedure, and was the coauthor of the 54-volume treatise, Federal Practice and Procedure with Arthur R. Miller and Kenneth W. Graham, Jr., among others. He also served as a special legal consultant to President Richard Nixon during the congressional investigations into the Watergate break in and coverup, and for a time was the president's lead lawyer.

== Early life and education ==
Wright was born in Philadelphia, Pennsylvania, on September 3, 1927. After graduating from Haverford High School at age 16, he earned his undergraduate degree from Wesleyan University in 1947 and law degree from Yale in 1949. Afterward, he spent a year as law clerk for Judge Charles Edward Clark of the United States Court of Appeals for the Second Circuit.

== Career ==
Wright taught at the University of Minnesota Law School from 1950 to 1955 and at the University of Texas School of Law from 1955 until his death in 2000.

Professor Wright was a popular, if somewhat eccentric, educator, conducting class without lecture notes or even a copy of the casebook. He had a photographic memory of the materials and would often answer student questions with a correct citation, by specific page, of a case different from the one the class was studying. He always refused to call on women students, unless they volunteered, considering the traditional Socratic approach ungentlemanly to women. In response to accusations of sexism, he simply stopped requiring any student to recite unless he or she volunteered. Professor Wright's icy reserve with students disappeared completely after they graduated and joined the Bar. Many of them were pleasantly surprised to experience his warmth, kindness, gentle humor and interest in their families.

He was elected a member of the American Law Institute at the age of 30, and served as its president for the last seven years of his life, from 1993 to 2000.

Professor Wright organized an effective boycott of the Faculty Club at the University of Texas at Austin when operators failed to live up to their promise that the club would not be racially segregated.

Wright was a Fellow of the American Academy of Arts and Sciences, a Corresponding Fellow of the British Academy and an Honorary Fellow of Wolfson College, University of Cambridge.

Wright represented President Richard Nixon on constitutional issues before the U.S. Senate Select Committee on Presidential Campaign Activities during its 1973 investigation into the break-in the previous year at the Democratic National Committee headquarters at the Watergate Hotel in the Watergate complex in Washington, D.C., and the Nixon administration's attempted cover up of its involvement in the burglary. In this capacity, in federal district court, he argued unsuccessfully that the constitutional separation of powers between the executive and judicial branches protected the president from having to turn over White House tape recordings to the Watergate special prosecutor, Archibald Cox. After the U.S. House of Representatives, incited by the Saturday Night Massacre, initiated impeachment proceedings against Nixon, the president shuffled his legal team, and in January 1974, James D. St. Clair supplanted Wright as Nixon's lead attorney.

Wright was an active litigator before the U.S. Supreme Court (though St. Clair, not he, argued United States v. Nixon in 1974). Associate Justice Ruth Bader Ginsburg described Wright as "a Colossus standing at the summit of our profession." A former student teasingly suggested the diminutive Ginsburg was actually referring to Wright's 6 feet 3 inches (191 cm) height. The politically liberal Ginsburg also referred to Wright, a Republican, as "the quintessential friend". By the end of his life, Wright was on a first-name basis with all nine justices.

Wright was also involved in both intramural and intercollegiate athletics. Wright served on the NCAA Committee on Infractions from 1973 until 1983, including five years as chair. At the University of Texas, Wright's achievements extended beyond the classroom and courtroom: Wright led the Legal Eagles – a stunningly successful intramural football team – to 330 wins during his 45-year involvement as coach and athletic director. He was also a member of the committee that was formed to hire a new head football coach of the University of Texas in 1997, eventually hiring Mack Brown.

== Personal life and death ==
Wright was married to Eleanor Custis Wright; they had five children: Charles E., Norie, Margot, Henrietta and Cecily.

He died on July 7, 2000, at the North Austin Medical Center in Austin, Texas, from complications following lung surgery, at the age of 72.
