= Arthur R. Miller =

American legal scholar (born 1934)

- Miller in 2007
- Born: June 22, 1934 (age 92); Brooklyn, New York City, New York, U.S.
- Education: University of Rochester (BA); Harvard University (LLB)
- Scientific career
- Fields: Civil procedure, Copyright law, Unfair competition law, Sports law
- Workplaces: New York University School of Law

Arthur Raphael Miller CBE (born June 22, 1934) is an American legal scholar in the field of American civil procedure and a university professor at New York University School of Law and Chairman of The NYU Sports & Society Program. He was a professor at Harvard Law School from 1971 to 2007.

== Early life and education ==
Miller was born in 1934 in Brooklyn, New York. His father, Murray Miller, was a lawyer who worked as a solo practitioner, and his mother, Mary, was a legal secretary. He attended college at the University of Rochester, graduating in 1955 with an A.B. with high honors. He then attended the Harvard Law School, where he served as a notes editor for the Harvard Law Review and graduated in 1958 with an LL.B. magna cum laude.

== Career ==
After law school, Miller spent three years in private practice as an associate with the law firm Cleary Gottlieb Steen & Hamilton. In 1961, he joined the Columbia Law School as director of its Project on International Procedure.

Miller was the Bruce Bromley Professor of Law at Harvard Law School (1971–2007), after being on the faculties of the University of Michigan and the University of Minnesota. He is coauthor with Charles Alan Wright of Federal Practice and Procedure, the legendary treatise in the field. This multi-volume series is an essential reference for judges and lawyers. He wrote more than 40 books and many articles, including The Assault on Privacy: Computers, Data Banks, and Dossiers (University of Michigan Press, 1971), one of the first books warning of the threat to privacy posed by modern information technology; Civil Procedure: Cases and Materials (with J.H. Friedenthal, J. Sexton, and H. Hershkoff; 1967–2008 (ten editions)); Federal Practice and Procedure (with C.A. Wright, some with E.H. Cooper, M.K. Kane, and R. Marcus; 1968–2008, West Publishing Co. (more than thirty-five volumes)); Intellectual Property: Patents, Trademarks and Copyright in a Nutshell (with M.H. Davis, 1998–2011, West Publishing Co. (four editions)), among many others.

In 1999, he made videotaped lectures for Concord Law School, an online law school, privately owned by the Kaplan Educational Centers, and videotaped 11 lectures for a course on civil procedure. Miller said the Web represented what television represented when he started doing his public-affairs television show on legal issues, titled Miller's Court, in 1979 — the next frontier for teaching law to the general public.

In October 2008, Professor Miller became Special Counsel to Milberg LLP and heads the firm's appellate practice group. Since then, he argued before the U.S. Supreme Court on behalf of Milberg clients in Tellabs, Inc. v. Makor Issues & Rights, and was involved in the briefing in opposition to the writ of certiorari in Pfizer, Inc. v. Abdullahi.

In addition, Milberg LLP's Supreme Court practice group was a key player in the Merck & Co., Inc. v. Reynolds matter, a case in which it serves as co-lead counsel. In August 2013, Miller joined the Lanier Law Firm as "Of Counsel".

Miller is the recipient of many awards, including eight honorary doctorates, three American Bar Association Gavel Awards, and a Special Recognition Gavel Award for promoting public understanding of the law. Queen Elizabeth II with the advice of her government bestowed on him an honorary Commander of the Order of the British Empire (2011) in recognition of his service to the United Kingdom by his gift of more than 1,800 Japanese woodblock prints by nineteenth-century artist Utagawa Kuniyoshi to the American Friends of the British Museum; these were exhibited at the Royal Academy in the spring of 2009. It also recognizes his more than fifteen years spent moderating public policy issues and dialogues, called Hypotheticals on BBC TV and Granada Television.

These dialogues were modeled on the well-known Fred Friendly dialogues, broadcast on PBS, for one of which Miller won an Emmy ("The Constitution: That Delicate Balance"). He served for two decades as the on-air legal editor for ABC's Good Morning America. His weekly television program titled Miller's Court was aired on Boston's WCVB-TV from 1979 to 1988 and was the first American television show dedicated to the exploration of legal issues. He provided commentary on the Discovery Channel program Justice Files. He also sits on the advisory board of H5, a firm specializing in electronic discovery for legal cases.

Miller has argued cases in all of the United States courts of appeals and several before the United States Supreme Court. He has worked in the public interest in the areas of privacy, computers, copyright, and the courts and has served as a member and Reporter of the Advisory Committee of Civil Rules of the Judicial Conference of the U.S. by appointment of two Chief Justices of the United States, as Reporter and Advisor to the American Law Institute, as a member of a special advisory group to the Chief Justice of the United States, and as a member of various American Bar Association committees.

Miller was appointed as commissioner on the United States Commission on New Technological Uses of Copyrighted Work by President Gerald Ford. New York University President John Sexton was one of Miller's research assistants at Harvard, as was Richard B. Bernstein, now a distinguished adjunct professor of law at New York Law School. Other former students include Chief Justice John Roberts, former New York Governor Eliot Spitzer, and Senator Russ Feingold of Wisconsin.

== Miller in pop culture ==
Miller was one of the real figures on whom Scott Turow based the pseudonymous Harvard Law "Professor Rudolph Perini" in Turow's bestselling memoir of his first year in law school, One L. Although Turow has never acknowledged or denied the connection, Miller has long thought himself the real Perini, and conventional wisdom in the legal community has largely concurred.

Several years ago, the NYU Law Revue created a spoof of Miller in a South Park style, entitled "What Would Arthur Miller Do?"

In 2011, students from NYU's Law Revue created a hip hop tribute to Miller called "A. Milley" based on Lil' Wayne's "A Milli."

== Miller as art collector ==
Miller is also known for his collection of Japanese woodblock prints by the nineteenth-century artist Utagawa Kuniyoshi, which he donated to the British Museum through the American Friends of the British Museum. Exhibitions were held in 2009 at the Royal Academy in London and at the Japan Society (2010) in New York City, which both received rave reviews.
