= Reversible Errors =

2002 novel by Scott Turow

- Author: Scott Turow
- Language: English
- Genre: Legal thriller, crime
- Publisher: Farrar Straus & Giroux
- Publication date: 2002
- Publication place: United States
- Media type: Print (hardback & paperback)
- Pages: 488 (paperback)
- ISBN: 03-7428-160-2
- OCLC: 49737067
- Dewey Decimal: 813/.54 21
- LC Class: PS3570.U754 R48 2002
- Preceded by: Personal Injuries
- Followed by: Ultimate Punishment

Reversible Errors, published in 2002 (paperback edition by Picador, 2003) is Scott Turow's sixth novel, and like the others, set in fictional Kindle County. The title is a legal term.

The novel was a New York Times best seller, won the 2003 Chicago Tribune Heartland Prize for Fiction, and was a finalist for the 2002 Los Angeles Times Book Prize for Mystery/Thriller.

== Plot ==
Reversible Errors revolves around three 1991 murders for which Rommy Gandolph was convicted. It begins with attorney Arthur Raven being assigned to handle the final appeal of said death row inmate. Though the lawyer does not even want the case, he discovers some problems with the conviction. Unlikely allies are found, including the police officer who made the arrest and the judge who presided over the initial trial. It becomes a race against the clock to determine the truth. The novel's 42 chapters are arranged in two parts, titled Investigation and Proceedings; the action is set in 2001.

Many of the minor characters also appear in Turow's other novels, which are all set in fictional Kindle County, located in the Midwestern United States.

== Film adaptation ==
In 2004, a television miniseries based on the novel and bearing the same title was released, starring William H. Macy, Tom Selleck and Felicity Huffman.
