= The Burden of Proof (miniseries) =

- VHS cover art
- Genre: Drama
- Based on: The Burden of Proof by Scott Turow
- Screenplay by: John Gay
- Directed by: Mike Robe
- Starring: Héctor Elizondo; Brian Dennehy
- Theme music composer: Craig Safan
- Country of origin: United States
- Original language: English

Production
- Executive producer: Mike Robe
- Producer: John Perrin Flynn
- Production locations: Mission Hills, Kansas; Chicago; Kansas City, Missouri
- Cinematography: Kees Van Oostrum
- Editor: Scott Vickrey
- Running time: 184 minutes
- Production companies: Mike Robe Productions; Capital Cities; ABC Video Enterprises

Original release
- Network: ABC
- Release: February 9 – February 10, 1992

The Burden of Proof (also Scott Turow's The Burden of Proof) is a 1992 television miniseries based on the 1990 novel of the same name by Scott Turow which itself is a follow up to Presumed Innocent. It stars Héctor Elizondo and Brian Dennehy (who previously played Raymond Horgan, a different character in the film adaptation of Presumed Innocent). The story follows the character Sandy Stern (who was played by Raul Julia in the film adaptation of Presumed Innocent) following events in the latter.

The miniseries was directed by Mike Robe, adapted by John Gay, and premiered on February 9, 1992. It was an original production filmed and aired by the ABC Video Enterprises, and was also released theatrically outside the US. by Warner Bros. Pictures.

== Plot ==
A lawyer who's still recuperating after the untimely death of his wife, must defend his probably dirty brother-in-law, a stockbroker under investigation. He discovers that everyone has dark secrets, including himself.

== Cast ==
- Héctor Elizondo as Alejandro "Sandy" Stern
- Brian Dennehy as Dixon Hartnell
- Mel Harris as Sonia Klonsky
- Adrienne Barbeau as Silvia Hartnell
- Concetta Tomei as Clara Stern
- Anne Bobby as Marta Stern (as Anne Marie Bobby)
- Gail Strickland as Fiona Cawley
- Chelcie Ross as Dr. Nate Cawley
- Kerri Green as Kate Granum
- Miko Hughes as Sam
- Thomas Anthony Quinn as Dr. Peter Stern
- Jeffrey Tambor as Sennett
- Nora Denney as Waitress
- John Durbin as Remo
- T. Max Graham as Lt. Ray Radczyk
- William Kuhlke as Cal Hopkinson
- Leah Maddrie as Mrs. Drake
- Monica McCarthy as Nate's Nurse
- Neal McDonough as John Granum
- Michael T. McGraw as FBI Agent #1
- Charles Oldfather
- Stefanie Powers as Helen Dudak
- Victoria Principal as Margy Allison
- Grady Smith
- Tim Snay as FBI Agent #2
- Donna Thomason as Claudia
- Charles Whitman as Rabbi

== Release ==
The miniseries was a production by Mike Robe Productions, Capital Cities and ABC Video Enterprises, it's aired in the ABC on February 9, 1992. ABC handled U.S. distribution, while Warner Bros. handled International distribution. Warner Bros. handles the rights of the miniseries to be released on theatrical versions and on home video (including Warner Home Video). As of 1996, The Walt Disney Company now owns domestic rights to The Burden of Proof through ABC, which had obtained the miniseries rights domestically.

== Awards and nominations ==
Year	Award	Category	Nominee(s)	Result	Ref.
1992	Artios Awards	Outstanding Achievement in Mini-Series Casting	Barbara Claman	Nominated	
1992	Primetime Emmy Awards	Outstanding Miniseries	Mike Robe, Preston Fischer, and John Perrin Flynn	Nominated	
1992	Primetime Emmy Awards	Outstanding Supporting Actor in a Miniseries or a Special	Brian Dennehy	Nominated	
1993	American Cinema Editors Awards	Best Edited Episode from a Television Mini-Series	Scott Vickrey (for "Part II")	Won	
1993	American Society of Cinematographers Awards	Outstanding Achievement in Cinematography in Miniseries	Kees Van Oostrum	Nominated	
1993	Edgar Allan Poe Awards	Best Television Feature of Miniseries	John Gay	Nominated	

== Home media ==
The duo-series has been released on VHS and DVD as a single movie, albeit a 184-minute release.
