= How to Rule the World =

2026 nonfiction book by Theo Baker

- 2026 Penguin Press book jacket
- Author: Theo Baker
- Audio read by: Theo Baker
- Language: English
- Subject: Culture of Stanford University and Silicon Valley
- Genre: Non-fiction
- Publisher: Penguin Press
- Publication date: May 19, 2026
- Publication place: United States
- Media type: Print (hardcover), audio, and electronic
- Pages: 336
- ISBN: 978-0-593-8-32837 (hardcover)
- OCLC: 1579797578
- Website: Official website

How to Rule the World: An Education in Power at Stanford University is a nonfiction book written by Theo Baker that provides a critical look at the culture of Stanford University from his perspective as a freshman and computer programmer in 2022. As a reporter for The Stanford Daily, a student newspaper, Baker was instrumental in the investigation and subsequent resignation of then Stanford University president Marc Tessier-Lavigne the following year. The book was published by Penguin Press in May 2026. According to the Washington Monthly, this work succeeds as an investigative report, an ethnographic study, and as a memoir. Baker took two terms off in his junior year to write this book.

== Parallels ==
Reviewers reference various parallels between this book and other works, such as the exposé nature of this book and Liar's Poker (1989) by Michael Lewis; the metaphorical journey to Silicon Valley as the "molten core" of troubled times, alluding to Jules Verne's science-fiction novel Journey to the Centre of the Earth (1864); and the contemporary trend of comparing technology moguls to the robber barons of the Gilded Age. As a memoir, How to Rule the World is noticeably similar in structure to the freshman law school journal One L (1977) by Scott Turow, All the President's Men (1974) by Carl Bernstein and Bob Woodward, and Careless People (2025) by Sarah Wynn-Williams.

== Film adaptation ==
In November 2023, Warner Bros and producer Amy Pascal secured the rights to the film adaptation of this book. In November 2026, Sean Wang was announced as director.

== Reception ==
Anand Giridharadas of The New York Times wrote, "Baker's first book, How to Rule the World, is a rigorous, self-assured, propulsive, at times terrifying portrait of a dweebocracy that "sets the agenda for the planet." In every age, there is some place that epitomizes how power works. Baker's Stanford is a strong candidate, and his book follows in the tradition of Michael Lewis’s Wall Street chronicle Liar's Poker, but with more pimples and less eye contact.

In the San Francisco Chronicle, Lily Janiak, commented, "As excellent a journalist as Baker turns out to be, he's less successful as a memoirist, whose task isn't to build a case but to tug the strings of the self's knot... For now, though, what a journalist. If Baker’s portrait of Stanford could be its own movie...is gripping account of how a tip turned into a history-making investigation has the makings of All the President’s Men."

Laura Miller of Slate magazine opined that this is "A crackerjack newspaper story... Baker’s account of assembling the Tessier-Lavigne reporting illustrates how meticulous investigative journalists work... How to Rule the World is a coming-of-age story, a campus story, and a newspaper story, but above all, it’s a horror story."

Sarah Ditum of The Times (UK) shared, "It’s enough to make your average embittered hack (me) feel queasy ... Baker’s book is a thrilling story of journalistic investigation: effectively, it’s All the President’s Men as a campus novel."

Alex Bronzini-Vender, reviewing this book for Washington Monthly, noted that "Baker's disdain for his subjects is, too often, an obstacle to understanding them... On Baker's account, [rampant] misconduct in students' economic and academic lives... flows from a culture of impunity that has long pervaded the university's upper ranks ... It's a persuasive argument... But Baker is not above a little overclaiming of his own ... [He] has a good sense of humor. But his impulse to play those around him for comedic effect weakens his analysis of Silicon Valley's politics, too: his subjects become strawmen."

Writing for the Los Angeles Times Book Review Arjun Appadurai observed, "How to Rule the World offers us the racy joys of television shows like Mad Men or Suits, with a good dose of The Social Network thrown in. There is something oddly retro about its style and about the Stanford it depicts. But this retro aesthetic slowly unfolds into something altogether darker. The voice at times reminds me of an earlier cult classic in American literature, J. D. Salinger's The Catcher in the Rye (1951), with Baker as Holden Caulfield teleported to Stanford in 2022."

== Media interviews ==
- Book of the Day (June 15, 2026). "Theo Baker, Stanford, How to Rule the World". National Public Radio. 7 minutes.
- Couric, Katie (May 20, 2026). "Live with Theo Baker: How to Rule the World". Substack. Video interview. 55 minutes.
- Here and Now (June 9, 2026). "Stanford freshman discovered How to Rule the World". WBUR radio and podcast. 11 minutes.
- Nawaz, Amna (May 21, 2026). "How to Rule the World Theo Baker interview". PBS News Hour. 9 minutes.
