= One L =

1977 book by Scott Turow

- First edition
- Author: Scott Turow
- Language: English
- Genre: Autobiography
- Publisher: Putnam
- Publication date: 1977
- Publication place: United States
- Media type: Print (hardback & paperback)
- Pages: 288 (paperback)
- ISBN: 0-446-67378-1 (paperback)
- OCLC: 50942678
- LC Class: KF373.T88 A33 1997
- Followed by: Presumed Innocent

One L: The Turbulent True Story of a First Year at Harvard Law School is a 1977 autobiographical book by Scott Turow.

== Summary ==
One L tells author Scott Turow's experience as a first-year Harvard Law School student. The book takes place in Cambridge, Massachusetts, where Harvard University is located. First years, or One-L's as they are often called, all face similar issues in their initial year of law school. Harvard, known for its reputation as one of the best law schools in the country, takes only about 12% of applicants.

Turow's recounting of his time there includes vivid description of the distinct rhetorical strategies, personalities, and personal peccadilloes possessed by his professors, each of whom made a distinct impression on the author and influenced the course of his career and intellect. Professors William Zechman, Nicky Morris, and Rudolph Perini are all standout characters.

All of the characters, including the professors, were real people, though Turow changed their names and distinguishing characteristics. One of the recurrent characters, Rudolph Perini, was identified as Harvard law professor Arthur Miller.

== Characters ==
=== Scott Turow ===
The narrator, a previously successful, young English instructor at Stanford with a deep affinity for law. After deciding to take the LSAT on a whim, his high score gives him the opportunity to select among the elite law schools. Turow notes that he decided to choose Harvard Law based on its reputation as one of the most elite, despite the fact that many of his colleagues who had attended did not speak very highly of the school. Turow and his wife move to Arlington, Massachusetts, and he begins classes in the fall of 1975. It is at Harvard that he "meets his enemy."

=== Nicky Morris ===
One of the notable professors at Harvard. Morris is known for his tranquil demeanor and unorthodox teaching style. Morris taught first year civil procedure at the university and was well liked among the students. Prior to teaching at Harvard, Morris had graduated at the age of 23 and developed a very impressive resume, including clerking for a Chief Justice. Morris was one of the easier professors who would call students based on the seating chart and offering them the option to pass on a question if they did not know the answer. Morris held a degree of contempt for the school and its teaching methods, noting that it did not please him that he was an educator at a place that had been the root cause of anguish and anxiety for many alumni.

=== William Zechman ===
A torts professor who recently returned from a long absence and proves to be a bit of a mystery to his students. His class, while engaging, is a long series of elaborate hypotheticals that appear to be designed to confuse students, or at least that is how it felt to Turow. While a kind and patient man, his classes often left his students befuddled trying to decrypt their incoherent notes.

=== Rudolph Perini ===
One of Harvard's most notorious professors. One L's are warned immediately of his class and are encouraged to stay away. Whether it was the workload or his overbearing demeanor, students were not a fan of Perini or his class. A proud Texan and graduate from UT Law, he made himself a large presence in any room that he was in. He had no issue with calling people out in class regardless of whether they wanted to participate or not. He encouraged students to remain at least three cases ahead of what the syllabus said, but it was implied that this was not merely a suggestion. He would verbally accost students who could not answer the questions; however, he had an amazing gift of making students think critically. Perini challenged students to explain and justify beliefs and values that were so central to their identities that they were nearly inarticulable. He often relied on the Socratic method of teaching, which a law review had referred to as "public degradation, humiliation, ridicule, and dehumanization." They go on to say that "Professor Perini of One-L has helped foster an image of the archetypal law school professor who challenges, probes and even humiliates students in repeated exchanges of questions and attempted answers."

=== Mike Wald ===
An old college friend of Turow's who he reconnected with once at Harvard Law. He was a second-year student who has come to law school after he realized that his dream of working in higher education was not financially stable enough. He was a member of the Board of Student Advisors which guided One-Ls thought their first year. BSA was also in charge of organizing and facilitating the Moot Court competition.

=== Chris Henley ===
A former OEO lawyer based out of Washington who was working on his graduate law degree while also teaching law. He ran the Legal Methods Program which was essentially a law lab.

=== Terry Nazarrio ===
A fellow One L Turow meets during his first year. From Elizabeth, New Jersey, he had been less than forthright during his application process. Upon their initial introduction, Terry tells Scott that the only reason he had gotten into the school is that the school had mistakenly believed that he was Puerto Rican. Nazarrio seems to wear this as a badge of honor.

=== Annette Turow ===
Scott Turow's wife, a teacher, who moves with him to Arlington, Massachusetts, a town next to Cambridge, to be with Turow during law school.

== Reception ==
The book became a perennial best-seller, read by many students as they prepare for their first year in law school. According to a 2007 story in The Wall Street Journal, One L continued to sell 30,000 copies per year, many to first-year law students and law school applicants. It challenged the Socratic method and made people think critically about how the law was being taught in the classroom. Harvard no longer uses the Socratic method to teach law because they realized that students were not learning to their full potential under that structure. The American Bar Association was also highly impressed with Turow's work; however, they pushed back against his anti-Socratic sentiments throughout the book. A novel with a similar theme was published in 1971, six years before One-L, called The Paper Chase.

== See also ==
- Careless People by Sarah Wynn-Williams
- How to Rule the World by Theo Baker
