= Scott Turow =

American writer and lawyer (born 1949)

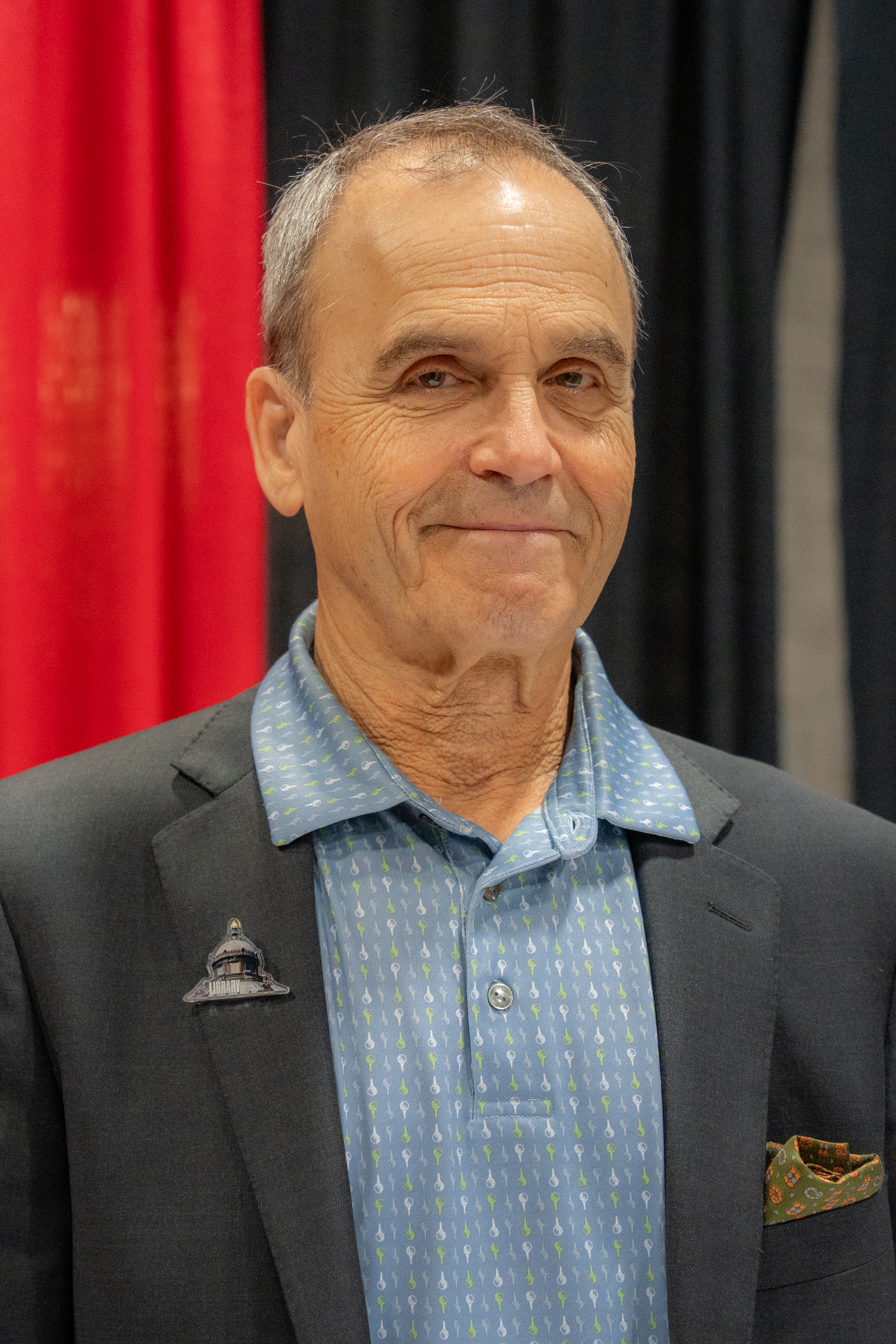
- Turow at the National Book Festival 2025
- Born: Scott Frederick Turow; April 12, 1949 (age 77); Chicago, Illinois, U.S.
- Education: Amherst College (BA); Stanford University; Harvard University (JD)
- Occupations: Novelist, lawyer
- Writing career
- Genres: Fiction, legal thrillers
- Turow's voice Turow on the difficulty of making a living as a new writer Recorded January 27, 2016

Scott Frederick Turow (/ˈtʊroʊ/ TUURR-oh; born April 12, 1949) is an American writer and lawyer. Turow worked as a lawyer for a decade before writing full-time, and has written 13 fiction and three nonfiction books, which have been translated into more than 40 languages and sold more than 30 million copies. Turow's novels are set primarily among the legal community in the fictional Kindle County. Films have been based on several of his books.

== Life and career ==
Scott Frederick Turow was born on April 12, 1949, in Chicago to a family of Belarusian Jewish descent. His father was a medical doctor. Turow credits his mother, Rita, as having served as his "beacon" and having shaped him with her "love, support, and boundless faith in me." In contrast, his father wanted him to become a doctor. After Presumed Innocent became successful, his father told him, "I still think you could have gone to medical school." Turow was first raised in the neighborhood of West Rogers Park on Chicago's North Side before moving with his family to the suburb of Winnetka at age 13. He attended New Trier High School in Winnetka and graduated from Amherst College in 1970 as a brother of the Alpha Delta Phi Literary Society. He received an Edith Mirrielees Fellowship to Stanford University's Creative Writing Center, which he attended from 1970 to 1972.

In 1977, Turow wrote One L, a book about his first year at law school. He became a novelist and wrote the legal thrillers Presumed Innocent (1987), The Burden of Proof (1990), Pleading Guilty (1993), and Personal Injuries.

In 1990, Turow was featured on the June 11 cover of Time, which described him as "the Bard of the Litigious Age". In 1995, Canadian author Derek Lundy published a biography of Turow, entitled Scott Turow: Meeting the Enemy (ECW Press, 1995).

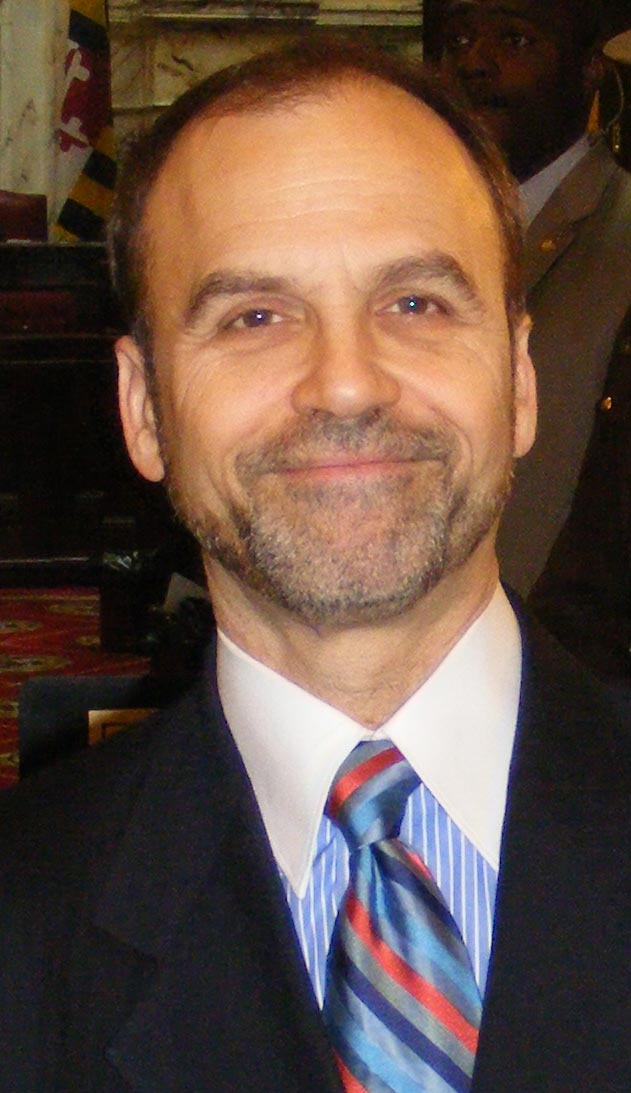
Turow in 2008

Turow was elected the President of the Authors Guild in 2010. As the President of the Authors Guild, he has been criticized for his copyright maximalist and anti-ebook stance. Turow has often responded that he is not against e-books, and has shared that he does the majority of his own reading electronically. According to Turow, he is interested in protecting writing as a livelihood.

From 1997 to 1998, Turow was a member of the U.S. Senate Nominations Commission for the Northern District of Illinois, which recommends federal judicial appointments. In 2011, Turow met with Harvard Law School professor, Lawrence Lessig, to discuss political reform, including a possible Second Constitutional Convention of the United States. According to one source, Turow saw risks with having such a convention, but he believed that it may be the "only alternative", given his stance that campaign money can undermine the one man, one vote principle of democracy.

== Works ==
=== Novels ===
- Presumed Innocent, 1987
- The Burden of Proof, 1990
- Pleading Guilty, 1993
- The Laws of Our Fathers, 1996
- Personal Injuries, 1999
- Reversible Errors, 2002
- Ordinary Heroes, 2005
- Limitations, 2006
- Innocent, 2010
- Identical, 2013
- Testimony, 2017
- The Last Trial, 2020
- Suspect, 2022
- Presumed Guilty, 2025

=== As editor ===
- Guilty As Charged, 1996 (as editor)
- The Best American Mystery Stories, 2006 (as editor)

=== Non-fiction ===
- One L, 1977
- Ultimate Punishment: A Lawyer's Reflections on Dealing with the Death Penalty, 2003
- Hard Listening, co-authored in July 2013, an interactive ebook about his participation in a writer/musician band, the Rock Bottom Remainders. Published by Coliloquy, LLC.

== Reception ==
His non-fiction work Ultimate Punishment also received the Robert F. Kennedy Center for Justice and Human Rights 2003 Book award given annually to a novelist who "most faithfully and forcefully reflects Robert Kennedy's purposes – his concern for the poor and the powerless, his struggle for honest and even-handed justice, his conviction that a decent society must assure all young people a fair chance, and his faith that a free democracy can act to remedy disparities of power and opportunity."

== Adaptations ==
- Presumed Innocent, 1990
- The Burden of Proof, 1992
- Reversible Errors, 2004
- Innocent, 2011
- Presumed Innocent, 2024

== Awards ==
Scott Turow was inducted as a Laureate of The Lincoln Academy of Illinois and awarded the Order of Lincoln (the State's highest honor) by the Governor of Illinois in 2000 in the area of Communications. The Chicago Literary Hall of Fame gave Turow the Fuller Award for Lifetime Achievement on October 5, 2023, as part of Chicago Public Library's 150th anniversary celebration.

== See also ==
- List of bestselling novels in the United States
