= The Burden of Proof (Turow novel) =

1990 novel by Scott Turow

- Author: Scott Turow
- Language: English
- Genre: Legal thriller, crime
- Publisher: Farrar Straus & Giroux
- Publication date: 1990
- Publication place: United States
- Media type: Print (hardback & paperback)
- Pages: 564 pages
- Preceded by: Presumed Innocent
- Followed by: Pleading Guilty

The Burden of Proof, published in 1990, is Scott Turow's second novel, somewhat of a sequel to Presumed Innocent. The Burden of Proof follows the story of defense attorney Sandy Stern in the aftermath of his wife's death and the growing realization that there is much about his marriage that he has never understood. Stern's bereavement coincides with his latest case, defending commodities broker Dixon Hartnell. Hartnell is a complex figure, one that Sandy admires but does not trust. Stern soon realizes that defending "Dix" will force him to tread a narrow path between zealous advocacy for a client and his ethical responsibilities to the courts.

The Burden of Proof is set in the fictional Midwestern Kindle County, Illinois, the setting of Turow's other novels, and features or refers to characters that appear in those other stories.

== Miniseries ==
In 1991, a television miniseries based on the novel and bearing the same title was released starring Héctor Elizondo.
