= Innocent (novel) =

2010 novel by Scott Turow

- First edition
- Author: Scott Turow
- Language: English
- Genre: Legal thriller, crime
- Publisher: Grand Central Publishing
- Publication date: May 4, 2010
- Publication place: United States
- Media type: Print (hardback & paperback) and eBook
- Pages: 544 pp
- ISBN: 978-0-446-56821-0
- Preceded by: Presumed Innocent (1987)
- Followed by: Presumed Guilty (2025)

Innocent is a 2010 novel by Scott Turow that continues the story of the antagonistic relationship between ex-prosecutor Rožat "Rusty" Sabich and Tommasino "Tommy" Molto as a direct follow-up to his 1987 debut novel, Presumed Innocent. Sabich, now chief judge of the Court of Appeals, is indicted by Molto for the murder of Sabich's wife Barbara; Alejandro "Sandy" Stern returns to defend Sabich. The novel was adapted into a television drama of the same name, starring Bill Pullman as Sabich, which first aired on TNT in November 2011.

== Synopsis ==
In the opening prologue of Innocent, set in 2008 and narrated by Sabich's son Nat, Rusty has been sitting with his dead wife Barbara for nearly a full day. According to Rusty, she was dead when he woke up in the morning; he believes it was due to natural causes, but complications arise because he had been previously accused of murder in the death of his colleague Carolyn Polhemus twenty-two years ago.

As it turns out, Rusty, who is now the Chief Judge of the State Court of Appeals for the Third Appellate District and celebrated his 60th birthday in 2007, has again had an extramarital affair, this time with his senior law clerk, Anna Vostic. Because Molto, now acting prosecuting attorney for Kindle County, was unable to prove Sabich's guilt in the murder of Polhemus, he is hesitant to pursue Sabich for the death of Barbara, but allows his chief deputy, Jim Brand, to quietly investigate. Eventually, the investigation yields enough evidence to once again indict Sabich for murder, setting up another courtroom confrontation between Molto, Stern, and Sabich.

== Reception ==
Both Kirkus Reviews and Publishers Weekly gave Innocent starred reviews. Kevin J. Hamilton, reviewing for The Seattle Times, called the novel "terrific" and praised Turow as "by far the best courtroom novelist of our time", but added "Turow glosses over the [character] detail and the novel suffers for it".

== Adaptation and sequels ==
The novel was adapted into a teleplay as the debut entry in the TNT Tuesday Night Mystery movie, which aired on November 29, 2011. Turrow published a sequel called Presumed Guilty in January 2025. The sequel follows a now 77-year old Sabich as he defends the son of his fiancée, who is accused of murdering a prosecutor's daughter.
