= Presumed Innocent (novel) =

1987 novel by Scott Turow

- First edition
- Author: Scott Turow
- Language: English
- Genre: Legal thriller, crime
- Publisher: Farrar Straus & Giroux
- Publication date: August 1987
- Publication place: United States
- Media type: Print (hardback & paperback)
- Pages: 448 (first edition, hardback); 432 (paperback)
- ISBN: 0-374-23713-1 (first edition, hardback); ISBN 0-14-010336-8 (paperback)
- OCLC: 15315809
- Dewey Decimal: 813/.54 19
- LC Class: PS3570.U754 P7 1987
- Followed by: Innocent (2010); Presumed Guilty (2025)

Presumed Innocent, published in August 1987, is a legal thriller novel by American writer Scott Turow. His first novel, it is about a prosecutor charged with the murder of his colleague, Carolyn Polhemus. It is told in a first person point of view by the accused, Rožat "Rusty" Sabich. A motion picture adaptation starring Harrison Ford was released in 1990. A second adaptation for Apple TV+ starring Jake Gyllenhaal was released in 2024.

== Plot ==
Carolyn Polhemus, an assistant prosecuting attorney in fictional Kindle County, is found murdered in her apartment. She is the victim of what appears to be a sexual bondage encounter gone wrong, killed by a single blow to the skull with an unknown object while tied up.

Rožat "Rusty" Sabich, a Kindle County prosecutor and co-worker of Carolyn, is assigned her case by his boss, district attorney Raymond Horgan. Raymond is currently losing his re-election campaign against Nico Della Guardia, an old protege turned rival, and informs Rusty that his continued employment is entwined with Raymond's victory, which he believes hinges on finding and convicting Carolyn's killer. This is further complicated by the fact that Rusty had a brief affair with Carolyn which ended months before her murder. She dumped him when he showed little interest in taking Raymond's job for himself, causing him to realize her ambitious, conniving nature.

With his obvious conflict of interest, Rusty takes charge of the investigation and makes clumsy attempts to divert its areas of inquiry away from the DA's office, and by extension himself. He's assisted by his friend Det. Dan "Lip" Lipranzer, whom Rusty replaces the originally assigned officer with. Rusty learns Raymond also had a brief relationship with Carolyn but recognized her intentions far more quickly and broke it off. The only person who knows of Rusty's own affair is his wife, Barbara, and the subsequent strain on their marriage led him to seek psychiatric help. Throughout the novel he reflects on various relationships in his life: with his late father, a closed-off, angry man; with Nico, a friendship soured by uncontrollable circumstances; with his son Nathaniel, his one purely loving relationship; with Barbara, a volatile mixture of devotion and disdain; and Carolyn, which he has struggled to define since its end.

Raymond loses the election and, within days of taking office, Nico charges Rusty with Carolyn's murder, encouraged by his overzealous deputy, Tommy Molto. Rusty hires Alejandro "Sandy" Stern, an Argentinean defense lawyer who has been a frequent opponent over the years, to represent him. The judge assigned to the case is Larren Lyttle, an old friend and colleague of Raymond's who has an acrimonious history with Tommy.

The prosecution's case against Rusty, which failed to definitively prove his affair and thus lacks motive, relies on circumstantial evidence: a bar glass with his fingerprints, sperm that might be his in Carolyn's vagina, carpet fabric that might be from his home, and records of a call from his home to Carolyn's apartment on the night of the murder, along with his attempts to seemingly impede the investigation. However, just as the trial begins the prosecution is forced to admit the glass is missing; Lyttle refuses to delay until it is located. As the trial ensues, Rusty learns through his and Lip's private investigation that Lyttle also had an affair with Carolyn, and she acted as a courier in a bribery scheme where Lyttle was paid by defendants to let them off in court. Sandy, while subtly threatening Lyttle with his own knowledge of this, is able to discredit a forensic expert's testimony regarding the sperm sample and inconclusive witness statements, persuasively arguing that Tommy, who was aware of the bribery scheme but not involved, has fabricated evidence to frame Rusty out of misguided loyalty to Carolyn. Without proof of the affair or that Rusty had been in Carolyn's apartment the night of the murder, Lyttle sees no reason to continue and dismisses the case.

Time passes and Rusty's relationship with Barbara worsens, after the trial had seemingly repaired it. One day, while doing some work on his house, Rusty discovers one of his hatchet-like tools has blood and hairs on it. When Barbara announces her intention to leave him and take Nathaniel, Rusty explains his deduction that she killed Carolyn, as revenge on the woman who nearly destroyed her family; she insinuates that he is correct without directly admitting to anything. At Christmas, Lip comes to Rusty's house and reveals that he has the missing bar glass, which came about due to careless mismanagement by Tommy and Lip's own disinterest in aiding the prosecution. Rusty talks Lip through how and why Barbara committed the murder while thoroughly cleaning the glass, destroying the only real evidence against him. They speculate whether Barbara left the glass at the scene because she wanted Rusty to know what she had done, or because she wanted him to be convicted as punishment. Rusty decides it doesn't matter, as he cannot bring himself to deprive Nathaniel of his mother and, except for Lip, will never admit the truth to anyone.

Nico, his reputation destroyed by the trial, loses a recall election and Rusty is appointed to finish out his term, though his career prospects beyond that are uncertain. The novel ends as Rusty reflects on Carolyn's murder, which remains officially unsolved nearly a year later. He wonders what led him into the affair which ultimately caused her death, and concludes it was an attempt to escape the existential crisis that has plagued him most of his adult life, even if what she offered was never more than a fantasy.

== Setting and sequel ==
Many of the minor characters in Presumed Innocent also appear in Turow's later novels, which are all set in the fictional, Midwestern Kindle County. A sequel to Presumed Innocent, entitled Innocent, was released on May 4, 2010, and continues the relationship between Rusty Sabich and Tommy Molto. A sequel featuring the now-retired character of Sabich, Presumed Guilty, was published January 14, 2025.

== Reception ==
Scott Martelle of Los Angeles Times called the novel's plot twists "inventive". Kevin J. Hamilton of The Seattle Times called its story "clever, chilling and wildly unpredictable."

== Adaptations ==
Before the original novel was released in August 1987, director Sydney Pollack bought the film rights for $1 million. The film adaptation was eventually released in 1990, directed by Alan J. Pakula and starring Harrison Ford as Rusty.

It was announced in February 2022 that Apple TV+ had ordered an eight-episode miniseries adaptation of the novel, with David E. Kelley writing the series. In December, Jake Gyllenhaal entered negotiations to star and executive produce. The series premiered on June 12, 2024. The series diverges from the book, most notably the ending, where it is revealed that Rusty's daughter Jaden (an original character created for the series), was the one who killed Carolyn and not Barbara.
