= Legal thriller =

Fiction genre

- Cultural origins: United States of America
- Features: Courtrooms, equality, justice, lawyers, legal language, social justice experience
- Popularity: Britain, Australia, United States of America, Canada, Belgium, France, Germany, Italy, Spain
- Formats: Books, television and films
- Authors: Brian Stevenson, Harper Lee, Ernest J. Gaines, John Berendt, Scott Turow, John Grisham, Michael Connelly, Paul Levine Jilliane Hoffman, Mark Gimenez, Linda Fairstein, Marcia Clark, James Grippando, Vish Dhamija

Subgenres
- Crime, thriller, mystery

Related genres
- Suspense, horror

Related topics
- Legal drama, social justice, films, novels, television

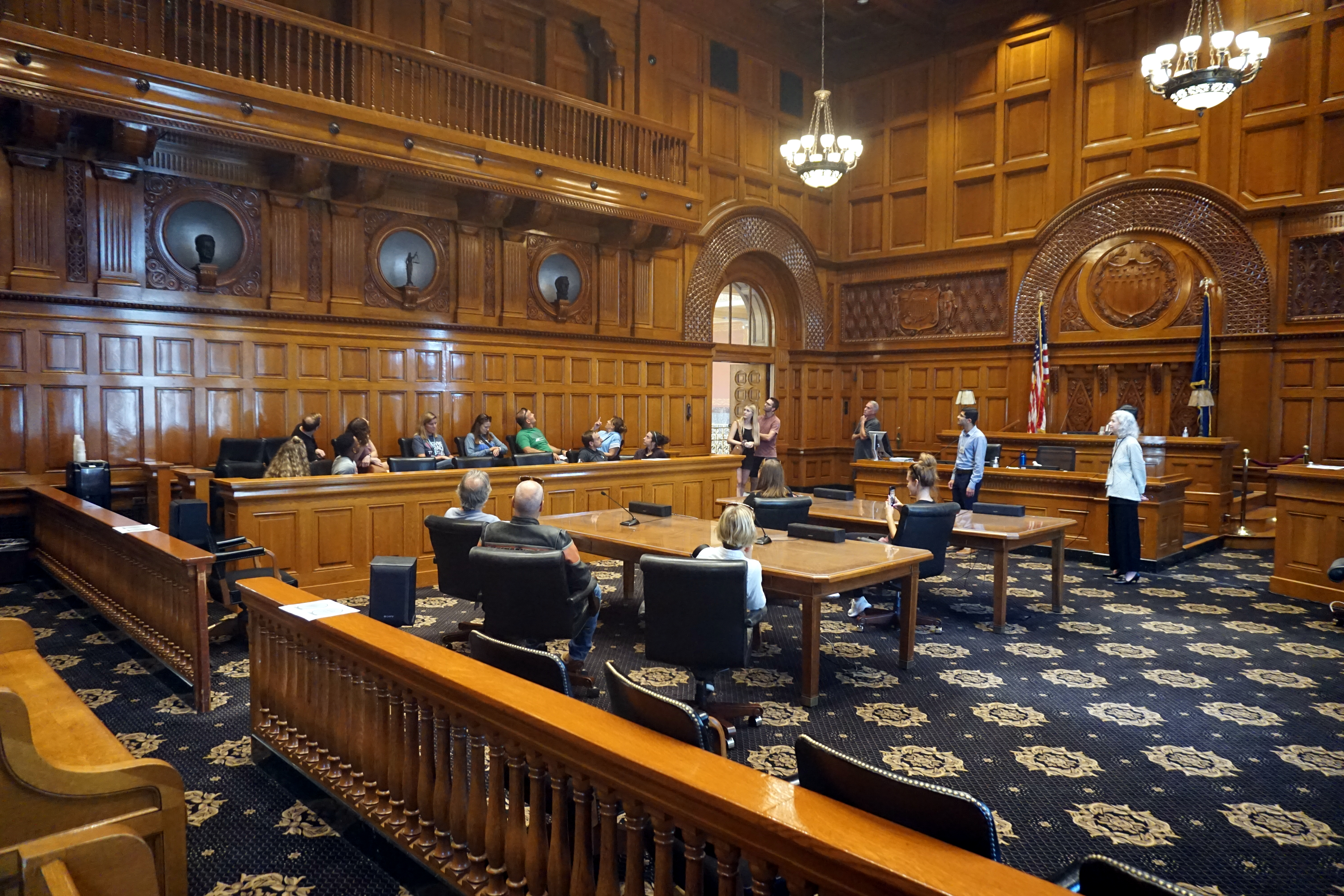
Legal thrillers often center on courtroom trials

The legal thriller genre is a type of crime fiction genre that focuses on the proceedings of the investigation, with particular reference to the impacts on courtroom proceedings and the lives of characters. The genre came about in the 16th century with the publication of short stories and novels based on court cases taking place at the time. Some of the novels were later adapted into early television series and film productions during the 1950s.

Many legal professionals, including Scott Turow in Presumed Innocent and Harper Lee in To Kill a Mockingbird, constitute the primary authorship of the genre, drawing on their own relevant experiences. The legal thriller genre's courtroom proceedings and legal authorship are ubiquitous characteristics. The genre features lawyers as legal professionals as the supreme hero. Their actions in the courtroom affect the quality of character's lives, as they determine innocence prevailing against injustice.

Legal language is also another characteristic of the legal thriller in that it employs real life lawyer terminology, courtroom, and police procedures among characters. The television shows Suits and How to Get Away with Murder embody the legal thriller, characterized by episodes based on scenarios of legal proceedings similar to actual court scenarios. Novels, films, and television series such as To Kill a Mockingbird, How to Get Away with Murder, and Marshall have received nominated for awards such as the Pulitzer Prize and NAACP Image Award for their awareness of controversial topics such as racial discrimination, gender inequality, and the death penalty. The legal thriller genre has expanded to accommodate contemporary social themes while also preserving the general plot and actions of original legal thrillers.

== Books ==
=== Earliest authors and novels ===
The earliest written version of legal thrillers came in the form of plays and stories printed in the newspaper date back to the mid-1550s. One of the first authors to bring into existence the legal thriller as a genre in the 1850s was Wilkie Collins. Collins learned from another writer who took an interest in the genre known as Charles Dickens. Among the first books Collins produced included The Woman in White and The Moonstone which was among the first novels to display the storyline of a legal thriller by incorporating the testimonies of various characters to show the storyline of a detective investigating a crime, finding a suspect innocent, and generating a storyline of suspense. In the 20th Century, one of the most popular authors in legal fiction came to be Melville Davisson Post. His style of plots were notoriously fast-paced yet easy to follow as seen in his novel Corpus Delicti where he showcases a calm, collected, intelligent lawyer who advises his clients to go to extreme lengths to defend his case.

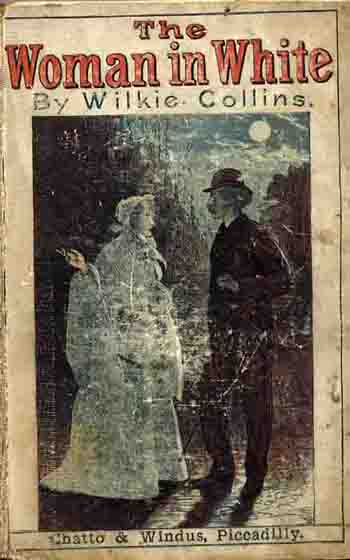
Cover of The Woman in White, a novel written by Wilkie Collins

Between the 1930s–1940s, author and active lawyer, Erle Stanley Gardner, wrote a series of novels that carried out the same proceedings of a legal thrillers as those in previous novels. In 1933, he wrote The Case of the Velvet Claws starring fictional lawyer, Perry Mason, who embarks on a journey of proving the innocence of clients that has been found guilty only to find that the culprit was one of the witnesses all along.

In 1958, author and former American judge, John D. Voelker wrote Anatomy of a Murder. The novel featured a lawyer named Paul Biegler who is in charge of defending a man accused of murdering someone to protect his wife. It became known for being one of the first most realistic legal thrillers for its thorough investigation and use of evidence to find the truth and defend an unlikable character.

=== Legal thriller novels today ===
The plot of contemporary legal thrillers takes on similar tropes to that of early legal thriller novels whereby the protagonist (typically a lawyer) is depicted as the hero and the courtroom is established as the setting for the climax.

The book A Time To Kill was about a white lawyer named Jake Bridge who is defending a black client Carl Lee Hailey after he was charged with capital murder for killing two white men that raped his daughter. After facing several setbacks outside the court with the family of the deceased, on the day of the verdict, the jury decided to extend an equal standard of justice and mercy to Carl after considering what the outcome would have been had he been white. In A Pitch for Justice, veteran prosecutor, Jaime Brooks is asked to investigate the matter of a pitcher accused of murder for his legal throw against a player. The debate between the lawyers in the courtroom established the courtroom as the place where they would study the unwritten rules of baseball.

Cover of To Kill a Mockingbird by Harper Lee

Two academically acclaimed legal thrillers that were made into films included Bryan Stevenson's memoir Just Mercy and the novel To Kill A Mockingbird by Harper Lee. The book Just Mercy details the life of a Bryan Stevenson who is set on correcting racial and social injustice through the Equal Justice Initiative. The book To Kill a Mockingbird details a murder mystery novel that provides close analysis of court proceedings amidst a dark period of racial discrimination in the legal system.

=== Major authors and their books ===
Major authors and books of this genre include the following:

Author	Name of Book (year)
Bryan Stevenson	Just Mercy (2004)
Harper Lee	To Kill a Mockingbird (1960)
Scott Turow	Presumed Innocent (1987)
John Grisham	The Firm (1991)
Michael Connelly	The Lincoln Lawyer (2005)
Linda Fairstein	Final Jeopardy (1996)
Paul Levine	To Speak for the Dead (1990)
Patrick Hoffman	Every Man a Menace (2016)
Vish Dhamija	Doosra (2018)
Jilliane Hoffman	Retribution (2004)
Mark Gimenez	The Color of Law (2005)
Marcia Clark	Guilt by Association (2011)
James Grippando	The Pardon (1994)

== Television ==
=== Earliest legal thrillers in television ===
The earliest legal drama began with the 1955 premiere of the popular American television show, "Perry Mason." This series follows the career of a criminal defense lawyer by the name of Perry Mason who deals with clients that had been wrongfully accused of murder. While Mason works on his defense of the client who is accused, detective Arthur Tragg and prosecutor, Hamilton Burger work together to build a case against Mason's client. During trial, Mason conducts his own investigation where he goes on to uncover illegal or morally incorrect behavior of those accusing the client. The show was central in introducing the theme of "moral ambiguity" referring to the moral conflicts that emerge in the plot of legal thrillers.

Following Perry Mason's show was The Defenders (1961). It showcased a father and son lawyer duo named Lawrence Preston and Kenneth Preston who frequently found themselves taking on controversial cases such as abortion, capital punishment, insanity defense, and more. In the episode, "The Benefactor," they were seen to be defending a doctor arrested by police for performing illegal abortion. The episode ended with doctor being found guilty for performing the abortion but the judge suspended his sentence. When interviewed by The View Magazine regarding the themes covered by the show, screenwriter, Reginald Rose stated that "We're committed to controversy."

Front Cover of "Law and Order" Television Series

=== Contemporary themes and language in legal thriller television ===
Social justice themes were prevalent within this show and police procedural elements in subsequent shows such as Arrest and Trial. The development of these television shows led to the creation of the most famous TV shows of the 1990s, Law & Order. Different categories of legal thriller shows also developed, such as courtroom drama, ensemble shows, and police detective dramas. The characters in these shows displayed ardent personality traits when investigating and dealing with complex legal issues of the justice system.

In How To Get Away with Murder (2014) the series features a legal professional as the leading teacher and a group of law students who devise tactics to combat various criminal cases and murder mysteries.

Australia, Denmark, and Poland import 62% of law and justice shows from the United States. Legal thriller television is mostly sourced from the American jurisdiction.

Australian legal thriller shows developed in the 1980s and 1990s covered both adjudication and punishment. The television shows concerning adjudication and punishment consist of the soap opera, Carson's Law and SeaChange. Both shows feature female lawyers who experience prejudice from males in their legal careers.

Thematic ideas of justice and equality are associated with the female lawyer protagonist's fight for change to break the glass ceiling. The inequality of men and women prevalent in the set time of the 1920s contribute to these themes present. In 2014, Australian legal thrillers developed were limited, compared to previous years that are tabulated with "45%".

In Britain, the most dominant form of legal thrillers are police and detective shows. Examples of these include the Dixon of Dock Green and The Sweeney. Women also played a role in these television shows as evident in Juliet Bravo and C.A.T.S. Eyes. Courtroom drama in Britain featured the series Justice as a prominent show, where the courtroom drama played a big role in its characteristic of the legal thriller. As Britain has three legal systems, this distinction was made apparent in the television shows, also highlighting barristers and advocates in wigs as part of the show.

As American shows dominate the legal thriller genre today, the characteristic of legal language has emerged. In the American legal drama Suits (2011), the series follows the career of a university expellee named Mike Ross, who is hired as a lawyers at Harvey Spector despite not having a license to practice law. The show features Mike Ross and other lawyers engage in various court proceedings throughout which they make their case using Latin and French legal terminology including terms such as "affidavit", "plaintiff", "defendant", "malfeasance", and "in lieu".

== Films ==
=== Lawyers in legal thriller films ===
Legal thriller films provide introspection into the life of a lawyer and legal professionals.

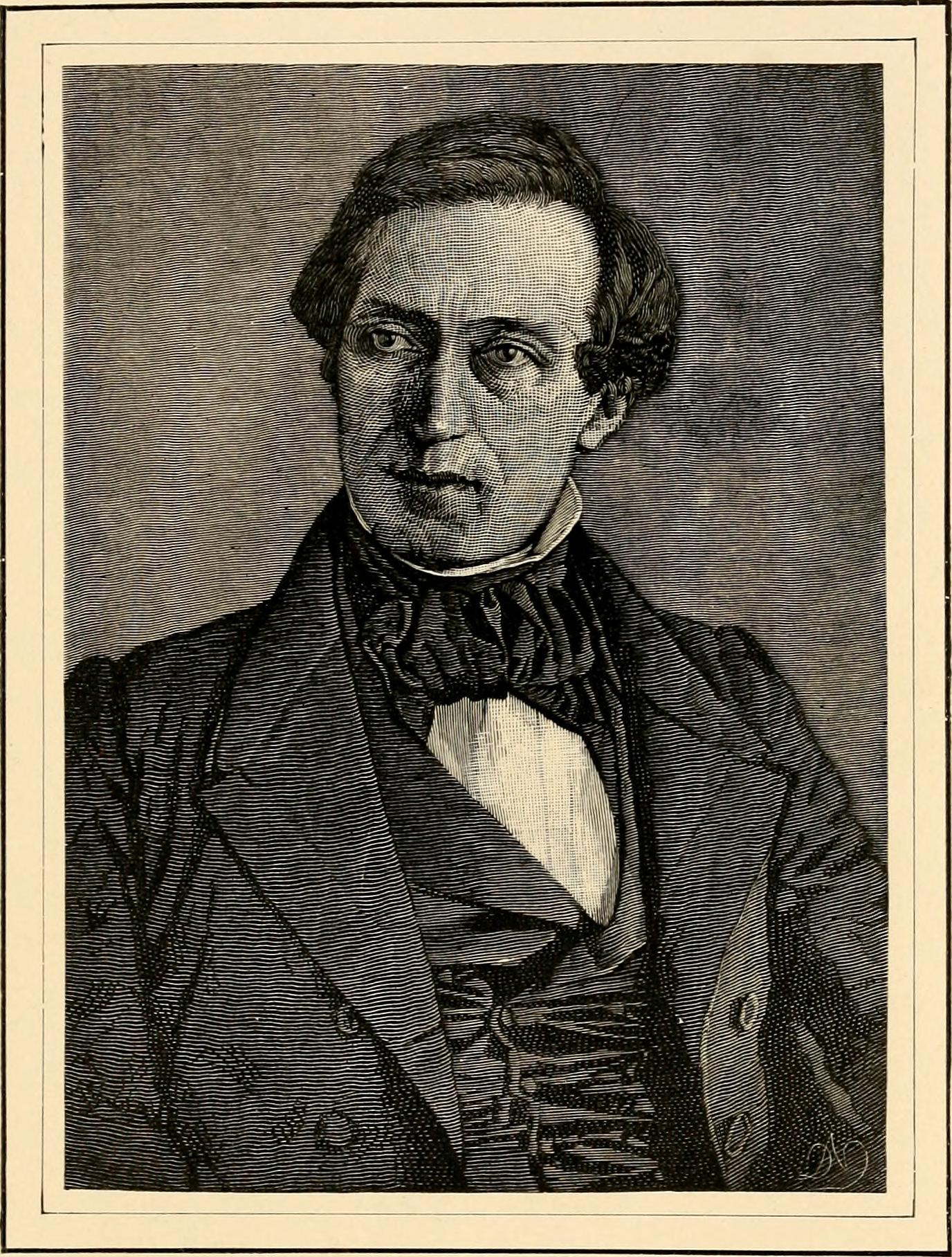
"Lincoln the Lawyer" a Representation of the Nature of Lawyers in Film

Within films, the central character is often engaged in professional work and experiences an obstacle that they have to overcome such as a client's case. The character confronts problems with their personal life and work, as it is under threat by the complex case, creating and series of action and courtroom battles.

The problems that characters face are evident within reviews of films such as The Judge, where family dynamics strain after a lawyer returns home for his mother's funeral. Reviews from the New York Times comment on the film's transformation into a crime story, characteristic of the legal thriller. The film itself unfolds the legal thriller's ideal courtroom drama style. The film takes place in what is deemed as a "nostalgia-tinged town". Further films such as The Lincoln Lawyer have also met similar reviews from Roger Ebert, commenting on the love of three elements in the film: courtroom scene, old cars, and tangled criminals. The 2019 film, Dark Waters raises an ethical dilemma of lawyers often choosing sides within films, as the defense lawyer has to switch sides to defend a poisoned community. He risks his future, community, and life by dealing with the case, characteristic of the legal thriller.

=== Film examples ===
The film Mangrove shows the inequalities and injustices prevalent through Britain's Caribbean history. Steve McQueen was the first black director of an Academy winning best picture with 12 Years a Slave. The five-part anthology, featuring Mangrove as the first visualizes courtroom drama and heroism, characterizing the legal thriller genre. McQueen made his film resemble a landmark of the civil rights trial against black activists. The film uses the characteristics of the legal thriller genre through a powerhouse courtroom drama and focusing on racial justice. The power divide between two opposing sides is intended to shape transformative victory, as audiences can learn about diversity.

A Fall from Grace also features the challenge often taken by lawyers in legal thriller films. For example, a young public defender has to handle the challenging case of a woman charged with murdering her husband. The film features elements of a conventional courtroom drama, such as the heroic lawyer, shady characters, and a law firm setting. Within the film, there are plot twist characteristics of the legal thriller genre. Furthermore, the film Law has ample court scenes and features a character taking on the fight for justice. The film defies the stereotypical expectations of women through featuring the main character as a woman who wants to speak openly about gang rape victimization.

The recognition of injustice is another emerging aspect of legal thriller films. Marshall is another example of a legal thriller film, where the lawyer is feature as the main character, traveling the country on behalf of the NAACP to defend black men who are accused of crimes. The film features a courtroom scene where violence occurs in retrieving the confession of a client and the difficulty to obtain the truth. As a film review reveals, flashbacks are used as a key film technique to craft outrage. The courtroom scenes are considered suspenseful and the setting of the 1940s shows a stage where people threw a facade with fake costumes and bright lights. Racism is exposed as a critical social justice issue explored where the truth demands a voice.

=== Legal thriller films ===
Summaries:

Year	Name	Language
1959	Anatomy of a Murder	English
1985	Jagged Edge	English
1987	Suspect	English
1989	True Believer	English
1990	Presumed Innocent	English
1990	Mounam Sammadhan	Tamil
1992	A Few Good Men	English
1993	The Firm	English
1993	The Pelican Brief	English
1993	Guilty as Sin	English
1994	The Client	English
1996	Primal Fear	English
1996	A Time to Kill	English
1997	The Devil's Advocate	English
1997	Amistad	English
1997	The Rainmaker	English
1998	A Civil Action	English
1998	Shadow of Doubt	English
2002	High Crimes	English
2003	Runaway Jury	English
2004	Reversible Errors	English
2007	Michael Clayton	English
2007	Fracture	English
2009	Beyond a Reasonable Doubt	English
2011	The Lincoln Lawyer	English
2013	Silence	Malayalam
2014	The Judge	English
2016	Manithan	Tamil
2017	The Third Murder	Japanese
2017	Marshall	English
2019	Section 375	Hindi
2019	Dark Waters	English
2019	Extremely Wicked, Shockingly Evil, and Vile	English
2020	Nabab LLB	Bangla
2020	A Fall from Grace	English
2020	The Trial of the Chicago 7	English
2020	Law	Kannada
2020	Mangrove	English
2020	Worth	English
2021	Jai Bhim	Tamil
2024	Juror #2	English

== Impact of genre ==
The legal thriller genre has had an expansive impact in the field of literature, film, and television. From its early exploration of social justice through novels such as Presumed Innocent and To Kill a Mockingbird to its influence on contemporary media such as Suits and How to Get Away with Murder, the genre has not only entertained but also educated audiences on legal intricacies and the moral dilemmas experienced in the courtroom.

=== Novels ===
Harper Lee's To Kill A Mockingbird sold worldwide and won numerous awards including the Pulitzer Prize for fiction. The novel was also translated into a film for which it received nominations in various categories such as best actress, music and cinematography and won the 1963 Oscars. It has impacted schools by becoming a part of the syllabus reading list for learning, as it addresses timeless concepts of racism and social injustice relevant to America.

Scott Turow's novel Presumed Innocent was a bestseller in 1987. His story introduced the sub-genre of the legal thriller by incorporating aspects of the criminal trial process. The core inspiration of Turow's work is examining a witness during a trial, the story stemming from the lawyer's own experiences.

Legal thriller books instigate the need for equality. The National Public Radio provides coverage of the legal thriller memoir, Just Mercy. Brian Stevenson provides insight into shaping the need for equality within America, as there have been a hundred years of supremacism and violence against black people in America.

The film, Just Mercy, raises the themes of equality and justice for the racial injustice against black African Americans in the United States of America. It has introduced the social issue of the death penalty, as American people disapproved of it after watching the film. The legal thriller enlightens hope that complex social issues such as the death penalty have the potential to change.

=== Television ===
Early legal thriller television shows reflected the plots of novels. Over time, they came to encompass the contemporary social themes and language that makes up legal court proceedings.

In 2015, the television show How to Get Away with Murder received the GLAAD Media Award for Outstanding Drama for its excellence in depicting LGBTQ characters and themes. In 2019 it was nominated for the NAACP Image Award for Outstanding Drama Series for its representation of lawyers of color.

The show Suits, received numerous awards for its actors including the Outstanding Performance by a Male Actor in a Drama Series award and Favorite TV Actress Supporting Role in 2012. The show namely consists of plot that much like the early series, The Defenders covered controversial themes of racial inequity and the corrupt nature of pursuing power and wealth in America.

=== Film ===
The film, Marshall was based on the experiences of civil rights lawyer, legal scholar and eventual Supreme Court Justice Thurgood Marshall as a leader of the NAACP Legal Defense Fund. He was devoted to identifying cases that would change history. The film has made a significant impact on audiences, as it has a turned a real-life hero to the all-time star of a courtroom drama. This is revealed in a film review, where it states the legal thriller has a created a real-life superhero for audiences to gain inspiration. Furthermore, using the idealistic approach of a young lawyer makes a compelling courtroom drama. The elements of historical racism embedded within the film dates back to the 1950s and has created a riveting, touching tale on audiences.

Throughout the popular culture of legal thriller films, there have been variations in the character representations of lawyers. The character representation of lawyers affects audiences both negatively and positively. The positive impact is the level of heroism performed by lawyers in saving their client's case. Negative representations are associated with the representation of lawyers as villains and distrustful. The representations reflect lawyers declining after the American Revolution. As many films, novels, and shows are produced within the genre, audiences can choose the images of the lawyer that they like. The process of revealing these images is through showing the beginning action, the action itself and the consequences of the lawyer's actions.

== See also ==
- Legal thriller novels
- Legal drama
